= Bikini =

Two-piece swimwear

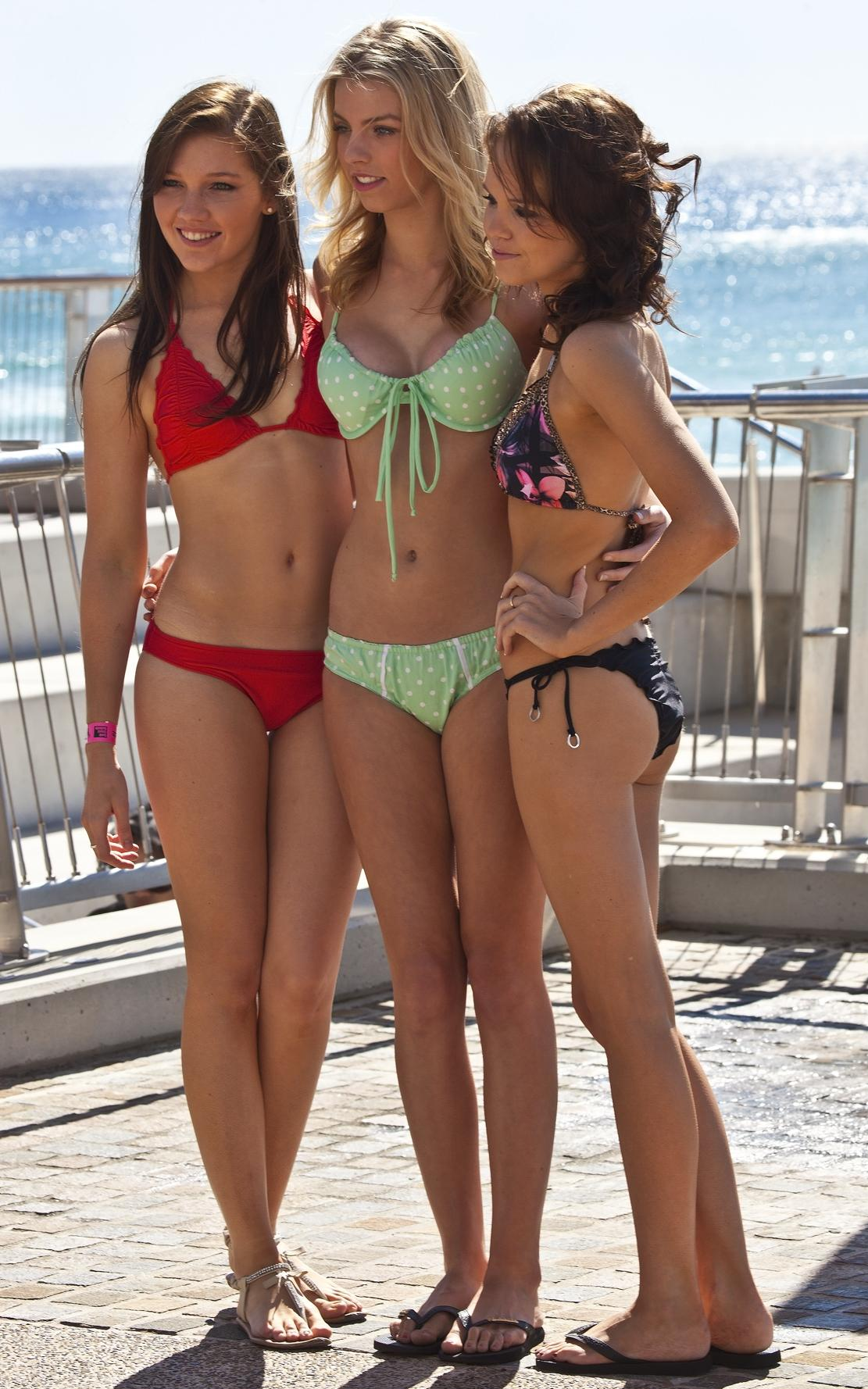
Group of women in bikinis at Surfers Paradise

A bikini is a women's two-piece swimsuit featuring a top piece covering the breasts, and a bottom piece covering the pelvis (usually excluding the navel) and some or all of the buttocks. The extent covered by both pieces can vary, from those that offer full coverage of the breasts, pelvis, and buttocks, to more revealing designs with thong or G-string bottoms that cover only the mons pubis and intergluteal cleft, and tops that cover only the areolae. Bikini bottoms covering about half of the buttocks may be described as "Brazilian-cut".

The modern bikini swimsuit was introduced by French clothing designer Louis Réard in July 1946, and was named after the Bikini Atoll, where the first public test of a nuclear bomb had taken place four days before.

Because of its revealing design, the bikini was once considered controversial, facing opposition from a number of groups and being accepted only very slowly by the general public. In many countries, the design was banned from beaches and other public places: in 1949, France banned the bikini from being worn on its coastlines; in the 1950s and 1960s, bikinis were banned in many pools and beaches in West Germany (based on a 1932 decree that only allowed women to swim in public if they wore a swimming costume that completely covered the front of their upper body, including their breasts), and some communist groups condemned the bikini as a "capitalist decadence". The bikini also faced criticism from some feminists, who reviled it as a garment designed to suit men's tastes, and not those of women.

The bikini gained increased exposure and acceptance as film stars like Brigitte Bardot, Raquel Welch, and Ursula Andress wore it and were photographed on public beaches and seen in film. The minimalist bikini design became common in most Western countries by the mid-1960s as both swimwear and underwear. By the late 20th century, it was widely used as sportswear in beach volleyball and bodybuilding. There are a number of modern stylistic variations of the design used for marketing purposes and as industry classifications, including monokini, microkini, tankini, trikini, skirtini, thong, and g-string. A man's single-piece brief swimsuit may also be called a bikini or "bikini brief", particularly if it has slimmer sides. Similarly, a variety of men's and women's underwear types are described as bikini underwear. The bikini has gradually gained wide acceptance in Western society. By the early 2000s, bikinis had become a US$811 million business annually, and boosted spin off services such as bikini waxing and sun tanning.

== Etymology and terminology ==
While the two-piece swimsuit as a design existed in classical antiquity,, several modern two-piece designs were introduced by French designers in 1946. The first was a two-piece swimsuit design released in May 1946 by Parisian fashion designer Jacques Heim and named the Atome ('Atom') and advertised as "the smallest swimsuit in the world". Like swimsuits of the era, it covered the wearer's belly button, and it failed to attract much attention.

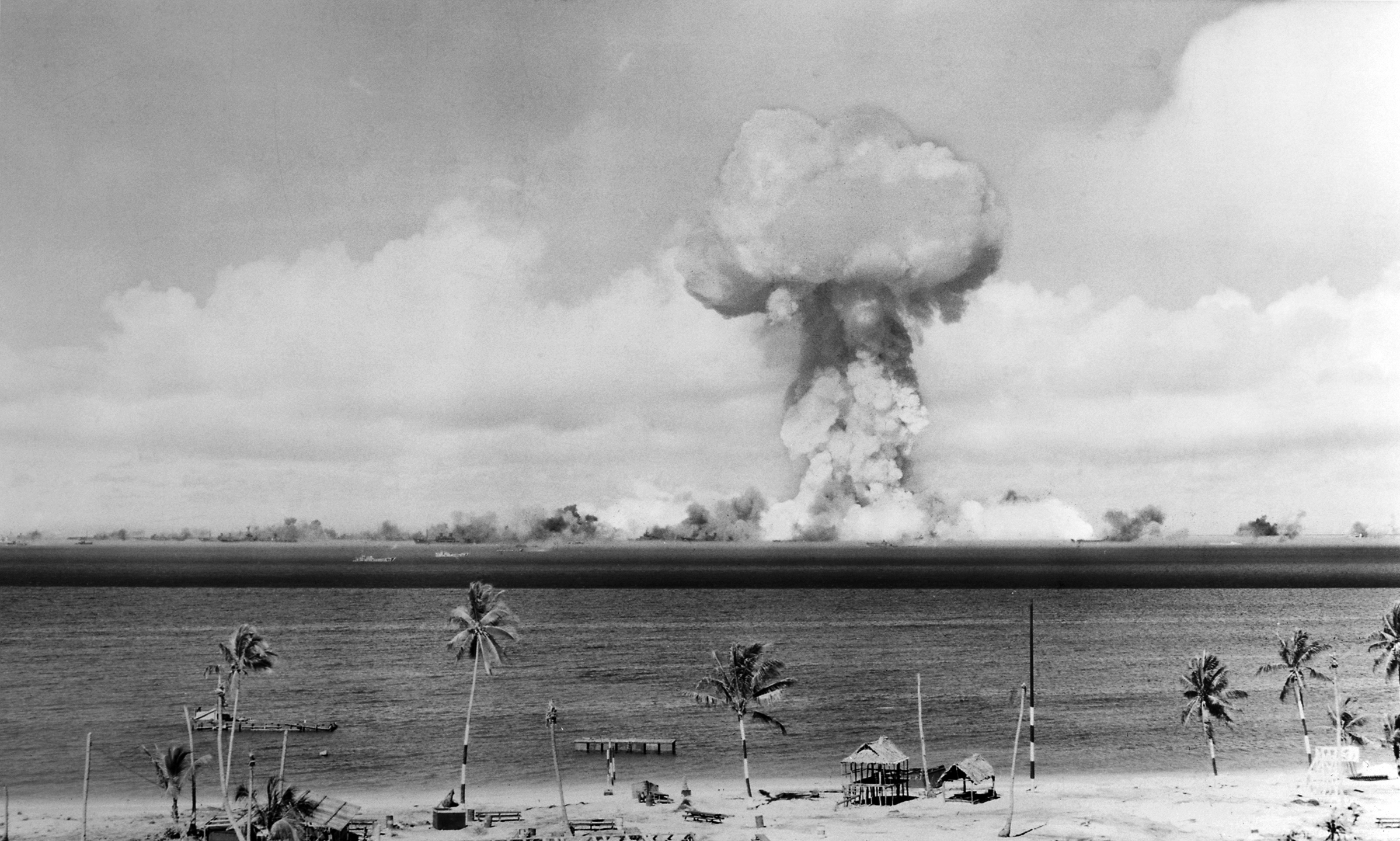
Operation Crossroads was a nuclear test series at the Bikini Atoll, and the inspiration for the naming of two French swimsuit designs at the time, including the bikini.

French automotive engineer Louis Réard then introduced a design he named the "Bikini" in Paris on July 5, 1946. Réard adopted the name from the Bikini Atoll in the Pacific Ocean, which was the colonial name the Germans gave to the atoll, borrowed from the Marshallese name for the island, Pikinni. Four days earlier, on 1 July 1946, the United States had initiated its first peacetime nuclear weapons test at Bikini Atoll as part of Operation Crossroads. Unlike the prior Trinity test, or most subsequent nuclear test series, the United States allowed both international observers and the global press to observe Crossroads, creating an intense international interest in the new weapon and its testing. Réard never explained why he chose the name "Bikini" for the swimsuit. Various motivations have been attributed to his choosing of the name, including the idea that he hoped it would create "explosive commercial and cultural reaction" similar to the explosion at Bikini Atoll, that it was meant to be associated with the "exotic allure of the tropical Pacific", from the "comparison of the effects of a scantily clad woman to the atomic bomb," and the idea that Reard's design had out-done Heim's design and "split the atome". Réard's advertising slogan was that the Bikini was "smaller than the smallest bathing suit in the world." The swimsuit's name was typically capitalized for several years after its coining.

It has been frequently cited as a major example of a "psychological link between atomic destruction and sexuality" in popular culture, which includes the stenciling of Rita Hayworth onto one of the bombs detonated at Crossroads, and its persistence in language has been argued as having "trivialized and downplayed the reality of nuclear testing," given the contamination done by especially later US thermonuclear tests at Bikini and other Marshallese atolls.

By making an analogy with words like bilingual and bilateral containing the Latin prefix "bi-" (meaning "two" in Latin), the word bikini was first back-derived as consisting of two parts, [bi + kini] by Rudi Gernreich, who introduced the monokini in 1964. Later swimsuit designs like the tankini and trikini further cemented this derivation. Over time the "–kini family" (as dubbed by author William Safire), including the "–ini sisters" (as dubbed by designer Anne Cole), expanded into a variety of swimwear including the monokini (also known as a numokini or unikini), seekini, tankini, camikini, hikini (also hipkini), minikini, face-kini, burkini, and microkini. The Language Report, compiled by lexicographer Susie Dent and published by the Oxford University Press (OUP) in 2003, considers lexicographic inventions like bandeaukini and camkini, two variants of the tankini, important to observe. Although "bikini" was originally a registered trademark of Réard, it has since become genericized.

Variations of the term are used to describe stylistic variations for promotional purposes and industry classifications, including monokini, microkini, tankini, trikini, pubikini, bandeaukini and skirtini. A man's brief swimsuit may also be referred to as a bikini. Similarly, a variety of men's and women's underwear types are described as bikini underwear.

== History ==
=== In antiquity ===
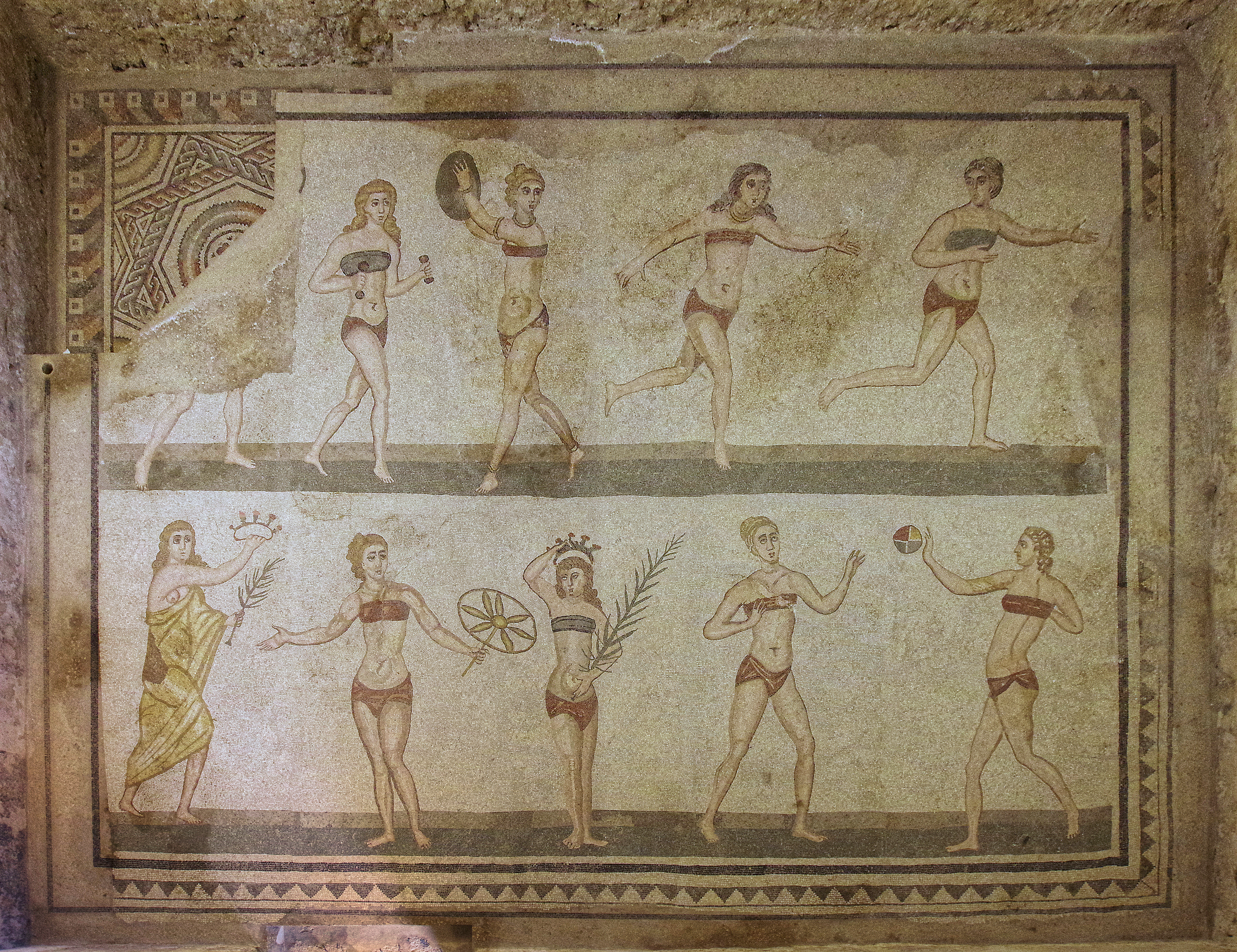
The ancient Roman Villa Romana del Casale (286–305 CE) in Sicily has one of the earliest known bikini-type images.

According to archaeologist James Mellaart, a mural from the Chalcolithic era (around 5600 BCE) in Çatalhöyük, Anatolia depicts a mother goddess astride two leopards wearing a costume somewhat like a bikini. The two-piece swimsuit can be traced back to the Greco-Roman world, where bikini-like garments worn by women athletes are depicted on urns and paintings dating back to 1400 BCE.

In Coronation of the Winner, a mosaic in the floor of a Roman villa in Sicily that dates from the Diocletian period (286–305 CE), young women participate in weightlifting, discus throwing, and running ball games dressed in bikini-like undergarments. The mosaic, found in the Sicilian Villa Romana del Casale, features ten maidens who have been anachronistically dubbed the "Bikini Girls".

Other Roman archaeological finds depict the goddess Venus in a similar garment. In Pompeii, depictions of Venus wearing a bikini were discovered in the Casa della Venere, in the tablinum of the House of Julia Felix, and in an atrium garden of Via Dell'Abbondanza.

=== Precursors in the West ===
Evolution

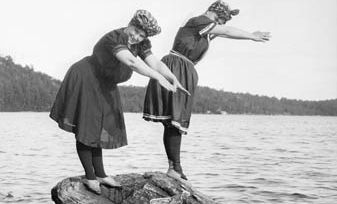
Loose chemises from the 1900s.

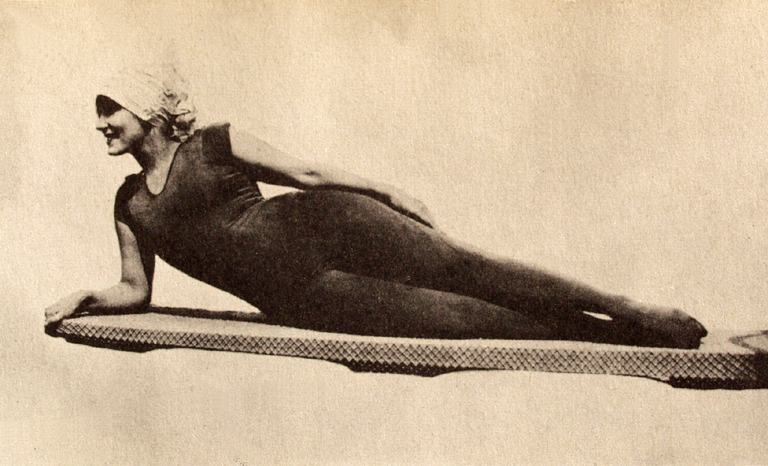
Annette Kellermann started the form-fitting swimwear trend, 1909.

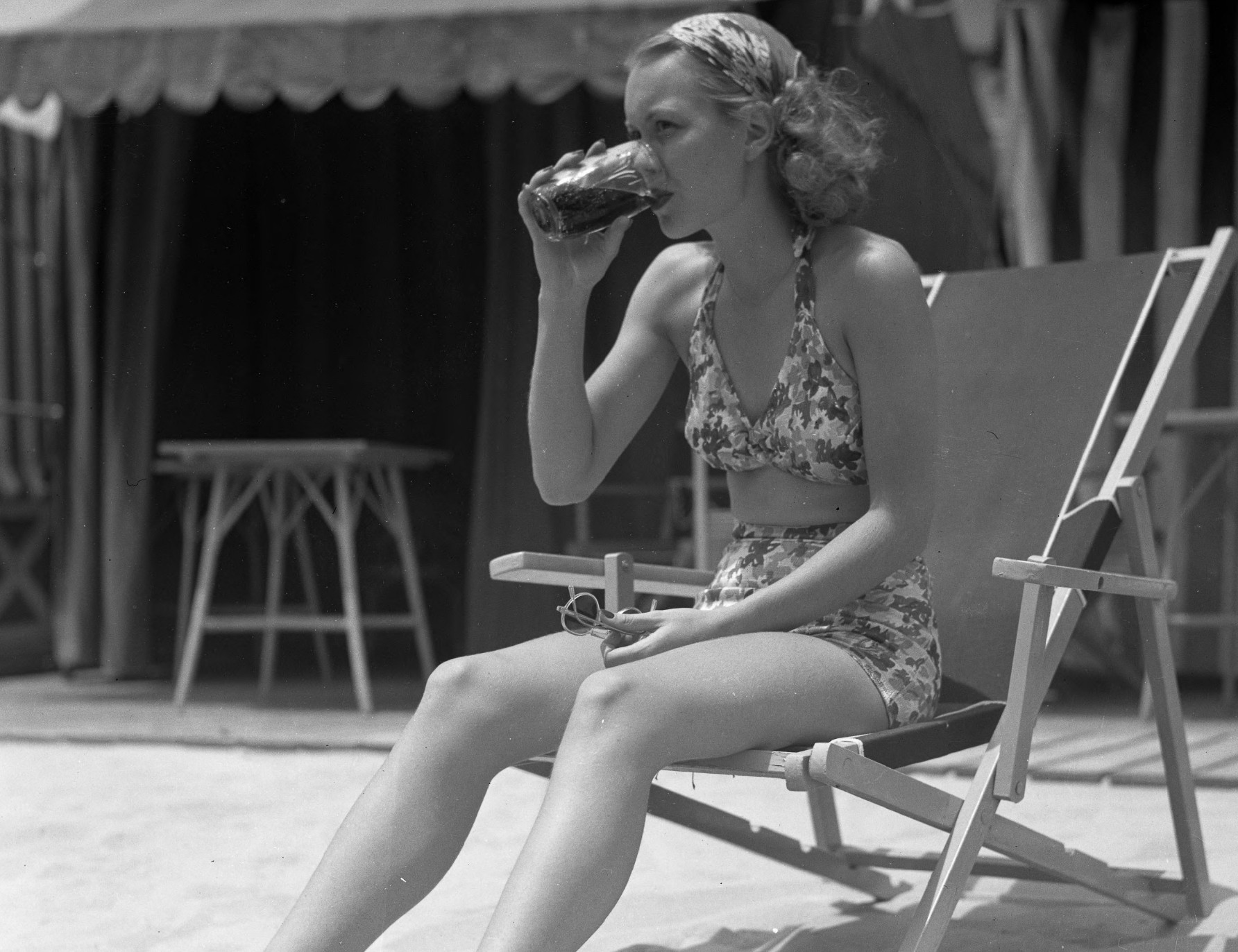
Actress Jane Wyman in beachwear that bares legs and midriff, 1935.

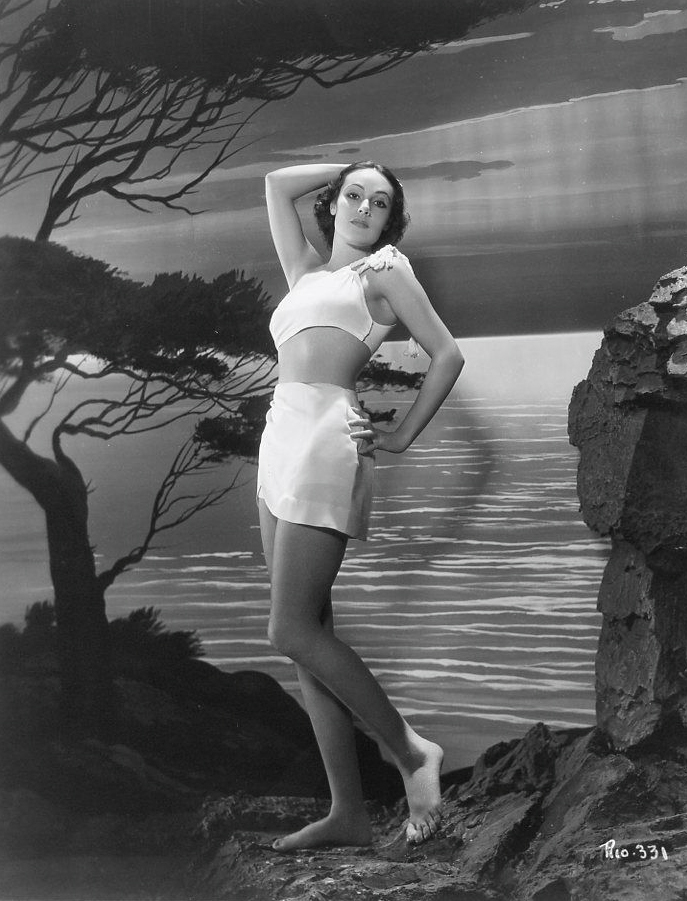
Mexican actress Dolores del Río posing in a publicity photograph for the film In Caliente (1935). Del Río was a pioneer in wearing a two-piece swimsuit.

The history of the modern bathing suit begins in the 18th century. The bathing gown of the 18th century was a loose ankle-length full-sleeve chemise-type gown made of wool or flannel that retained coverage and modesty.

In 1907, Australian swimmer and performer Annette Kellermann was arrested on a Boston beach for wearing form-fitting sleeveless one-piece knitted swimming tights that covered her from neck to toe, a costume she adopted from England, although it became accepted swimsuit attire for women in parts of Europe by 1910. In 1913, designer Carl Jantzen made the first functional two-piece swimwear. Inspired by the introduction of females into Olympic swimming he designed a close-fitting costume with shorts for the bottom and short sleeves for the top.

During the 1920s and 1930s, people began to shift from "taking in the water" to "taking in the sun", at bathhouses and spas, and swimsuit designs shifted from functional considerations to incorporate more decorative features. Rayon was used in the 1920s in the manufacture of tight-fitting swimsuits, but durability issues, especially when wet, proved problematic. Jersey and silk were also sometimes used. By the 1930s, manufacturers had lowered necklines in the back, removed sleeves, and tightened the sides. With the development of new clothing materials, particularly latex and nylon, swimsuits gradually began hugging the body through the 1930s, with shoulder straps that could be lowered for tanning.

Women's swimwear of the 1930s and 1940s incorporated increasing degrees of midriff exposure. The 1932 Hollywood film Three on a Match featured a midriff-baring two-piece bathing suit. Actress Dolores del Río was the first major star to wear a two-piece women's bathing suit onscreen in Flying Down to Rio (1933).

Teen magazines of late 1940s and 1950s featured similar designs of midriff-baring suits and tops. However, midriff fashion was stated as only for beaches and informal events and considered indecent to be worn in public. Hollywood endorsed the new glamor in films like 1949's Neptune's Daughter in which Esther Williams wore provocatively named costumes such as "Double Entendre" and "Honey Child".

Wartime production during World War II required vast amounts of cotton, silk, nylon, wool, leather, and rubber. In 1942, the United States War Production Board issued Regulation L-85, cutting the use of natural fibers in clothing and mandating a 10% reduction in the amount of fabric in women's beachwear. To comply with the regulations, swimsuit manufacturers removed skirt panels and other attachments, while increasing production of the two-piece swimsuit with bare midriffs. At the same time, demand for all swimwear declined as there was not much interest in going to the beach, especially in Europe.

=== Modern bikini ===
Micheline Bernardini on 5 July 1946 at the Piscine Molitor modeling Réard's bikini, which was small enough to fit into the 5-by-5-by-5-centimeter (2.0 by 2.0 by 2.0 in) box she is holding.

In the summer of 1946, Western Europeans enjoyed their first war-free summer in many years. French designers sought to deliver fashions that matched the liberated mood of the people. Fabric was still in short supply, and in an endeavor to resurrect swimwear sales, two French designers – Jacques Heim and Louis Réard – almost simultaneously launched new two-piece swimsuit designs in 1946. Heim launched a two-piece swimsuit design in Paris that he called the atome, after the smallest known particle of matter. He announced that it was the "world's smallest bathing suit." Although briefer than the two-piece swimsuits of the 1930s, the bottom of Heim's new two-piece beach costume still covered the wearer's navel.

Soon after, Louis Réard created a competing two-piece swimsuit design, which he called the bikini. He noticed that women at the beach rolled up the edges of their swimsuit bottoms and tops to improve their tan. On 5 July, Réard introduced his design at a swimsuit review held at a popular Paris public pool, Piscine Molitor, four days after the first test of a US nuclear weapon at the Bikini Atoll. The newspapers were full of news about it and Réard hoped for the same with his design. Réard's bikini undercut Heim's atome in its brevity. His design consisted of two side-by-side triangles of fabric forming a bra, and two front-and-back triangular pieces of fabric covering the mons pubis and the buttocks, respectively, connected by string. When he was unable to find a fashion model willing to showcase his revealing design, Réard hired Micheline Bernardini, an 18-year old nude dancer from the Casino de Paris. He announced that his swimsuit, was "smaller than the world's smallest bathing suit". Réard said that "like the [atom] bomb, the bikini is small and devastating". Fashion writer Diana Vreeland described the bikini as the "atom bomb of fashion". Bernardini received 50,000 fan letters, many of them from men.

Photographs of Bernardini and articles about the event were widely carried by the press. The International Herald Tribune alone ran nine stories on the event. French newspaper Le Figaro wrote, "People were craving the simple pleasures of the sea and the sun. For women, wearing a bikini signaled a kind of second liberation. There was really nothing sexual about this. It was instead a celebration of freedom and a return to the joys in life."

Heim's atome was more in keeping with the sense of propriety of the 1940s, but Réard's design won the public's attention. Although Heim's design was the first worn on the beach and initially sold more swimsuits, it was Réard's description of the two-piece swimsuit as a bikini that stuck. As competing designs emerged, he declared in advertisements that a swimsuit could not be a genuine bikini "unless it could be pulled through a wedding ring." Modern bikinis were first made of cotton and jersey.

=== Social resistance ===
As subsequent history would show, the bikini was more than a skimpy garment. It was a state of mind.

— Lena Lenček

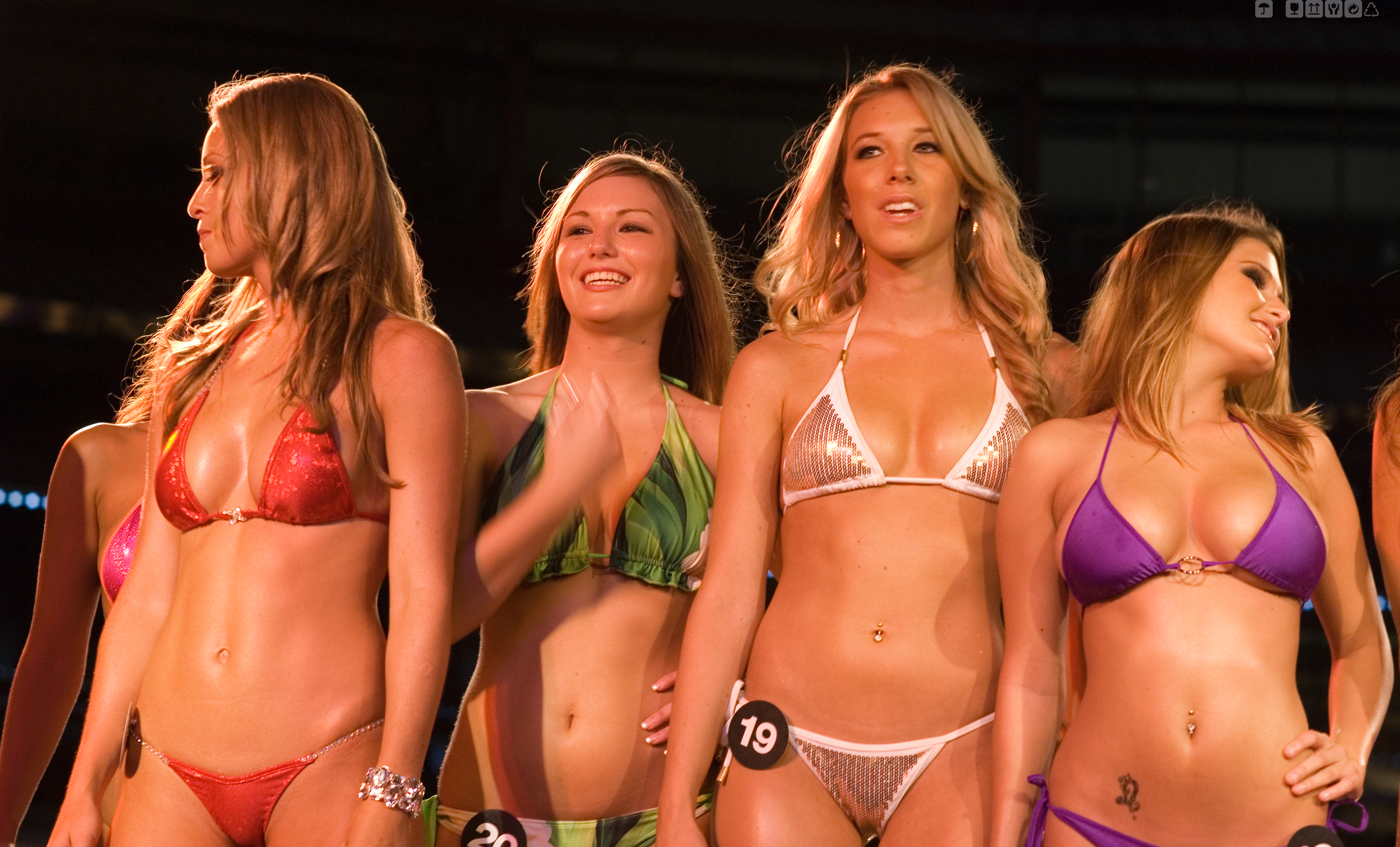
A Hooters bikini contest in Jacksonville, Florida, 2009, featuring popular modern designs such as triangle tops and thong-style bottoms.

Despite the garment's initial success in France, women worldwide continued to wear traditional one-piece swimsuits. When his sales stalled, Réard went back to designing and selling orthodox knickers. In 1950, American swimsuit mogul Fred Cole, owner of mass market swimwear firm Cole of California, told Time that he had "little but scorn for France's famed Bikinis." Réard himself would later describe it as a "two-piece bathing suit which reveals everything about a girl except for her mother's maiden name." Fashion magazine Modern Girl Magazine in 1957 stated that "it is hardly necessary to waste words over the so-called bikini since it is inconceivable that any girl with tact and decency would ever wear such a thing".

In 1951, actress Jean Parker made international headlines when she was escorted off Bondi Beach by swimsuit inspector Abe Laidlaw, who measured her bikini and determined it was too skimpy. That same year, Eric Morley organized the Festival Bikini Contest, a beauty contest and swimwear advertising opportunity at that year's Festival of Britain. The press, welcoming the spectacle, referred to it as Miss World, a name Morley registered as a trademark. The winner was Kiki Håkansson of Sweden, who was crowned in a bikini. After the crowning, Håkansson was condemned by Pope Pius XII, while Spain and Ireland threatened to withdraw from the pageant. In 1952, bikinis were banned from the pageant and replaced by evening gowns. As a result of the controversy, the bikini was explicitly banned from many other beauty pageants worldwide. Although some regarded the bikini and beauty contests as bringing freedom to women, they were opposed by some feminists as well as religious and cultural groups who objected to the degree of exposure of the female body.

Paula Stafford was an Australian fashion designer credited with introducing the bikini to Australia; in a famous incident in 1952, model Ann Ferguson was asked to leave a beach in Surfers Paradise because her Paula Stafford bikini was too revealing. The bikini was banned in Australia, on the French Atlantic coastline, in Spain, in Italy, and in Portugal, and was prohibited or discouraged in a number of US states. The United States Motion Picture Production Code, also known as the Hays Code, enforced from 1934, allowed two-piece gowns but prohibited the display of navels in Hollywood films. The National Legion of Decency, a Roman Catholic body overseeing American media content, also pressured Hollywood and foreign film producers to keep bikinis from being featured in Hollywood movies. As late as 1959 one of the United States' largest swimsuit designers, Anne Cole of the Anne Cole brand, said, "It's nothing more than a G-string. It's at the razor's edge of decency." The Hays Code was abandoned by the mid-1960s, and with it the prohibition of female navel exposure, as well as other restrictions. The influence of the National Legion of Decency also waned by the 1960s.

=== Rise to popularity ===
Evolution

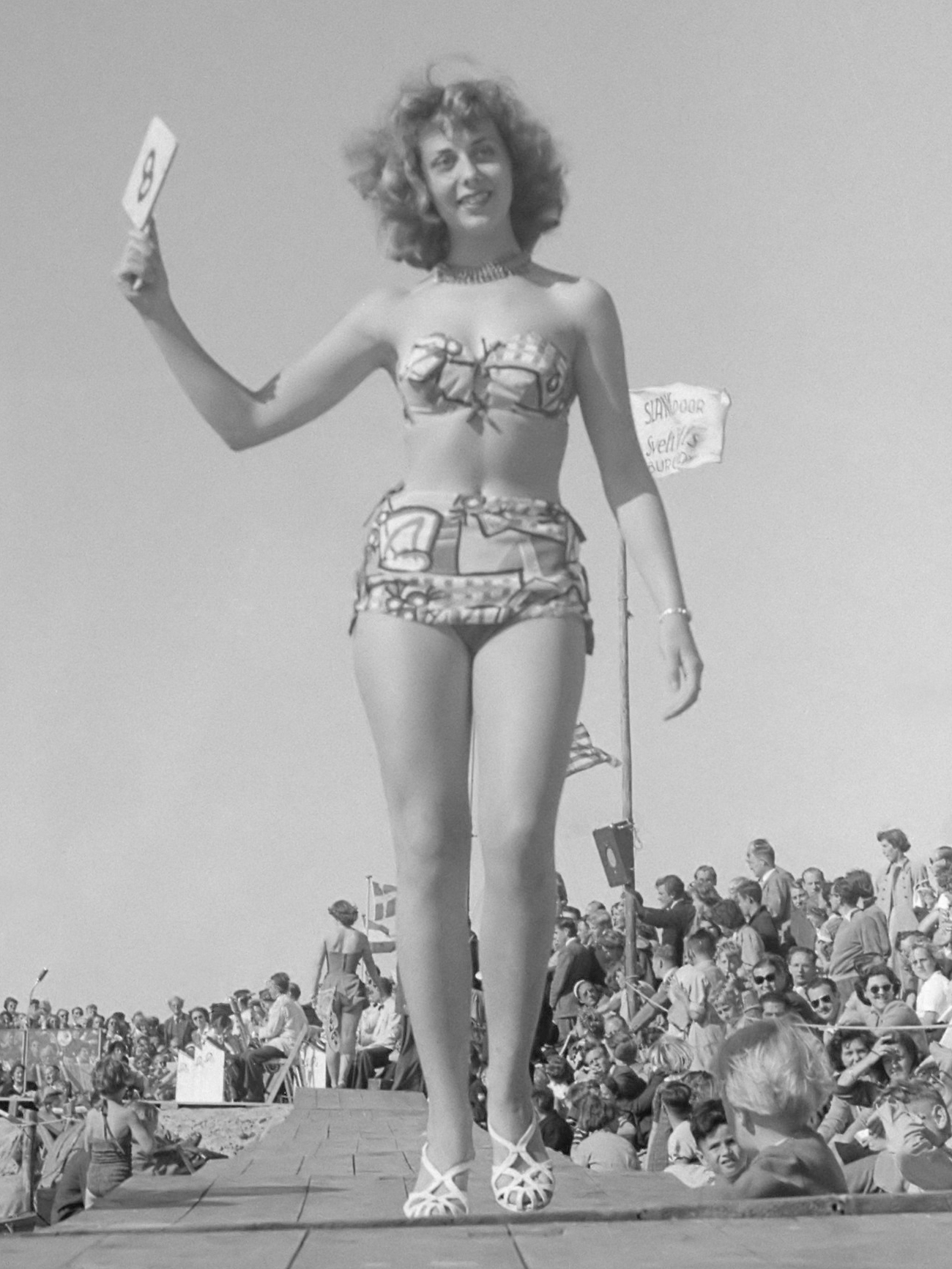
Mimi Kok, Netherlands, 1951.

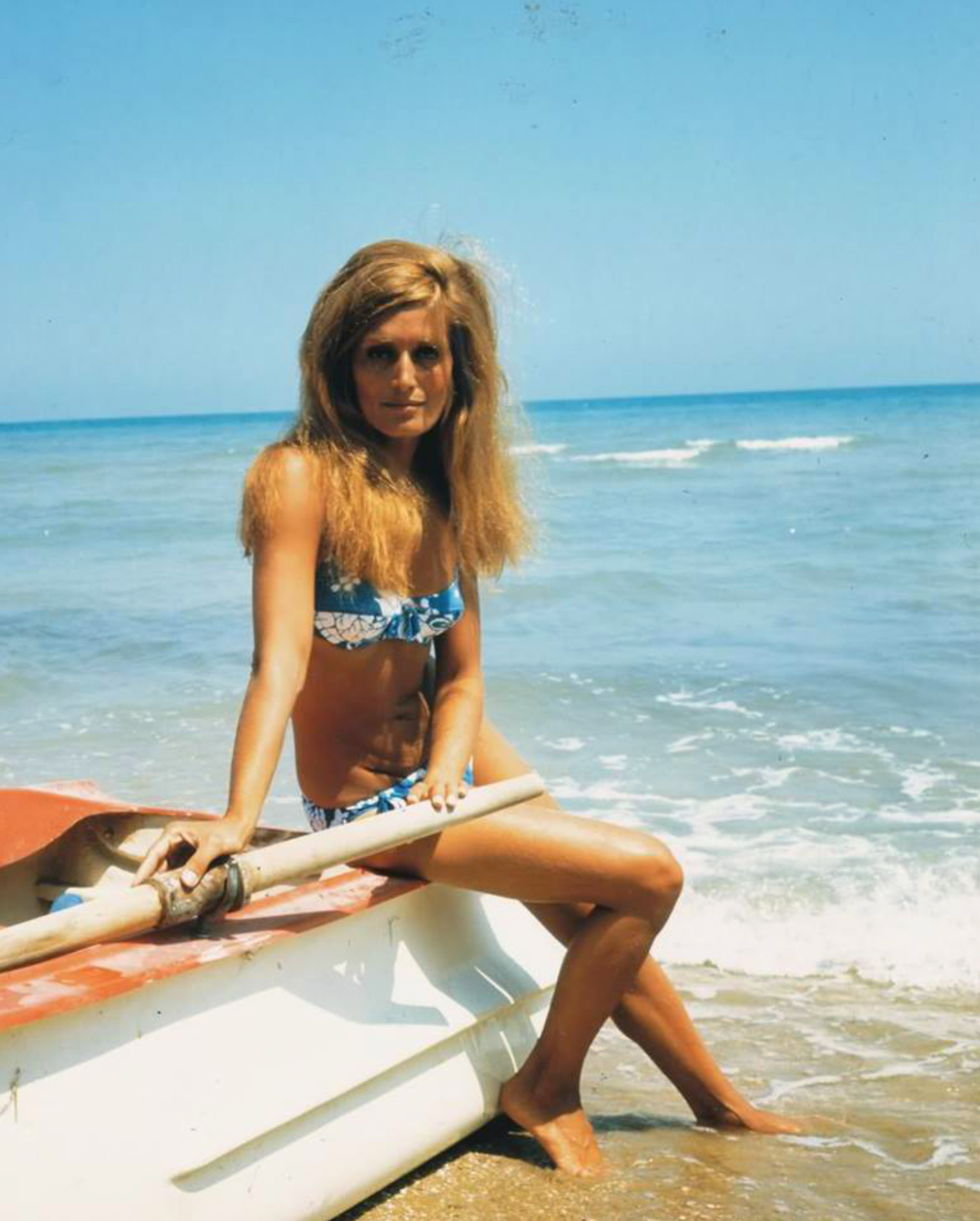
Dalida, Italy, 1968.

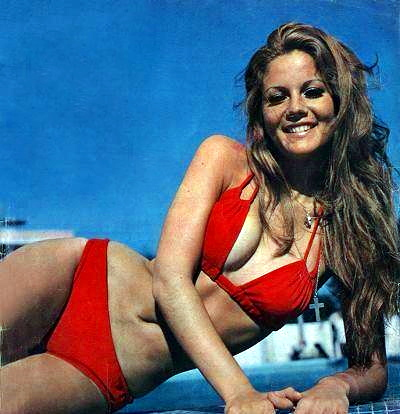
Graciela Alfano, Argentina, 1972.

Increasingly common glamour shots of popular actresses and models on either side of the Atlantic played a large part in bringing the bikini into the mainstream. During the 1950s, Hollywood stars such as Ava Gardner, Rita Hayworth, Lana Turner, Elizabeth Taylor, Tina Louise, Marilyn Monroe, Esther Williams, and Betty Grable took advantage of the risqué publicity associated with the bikini by posing for photographs wearing them—pin-ups of Hayworth and Williams in costume were especially widely distributed in the United States. In 1950, Elvira Pagã walked at the Rio Carnival, Brazil in a golden bikini, starting the bikini tradition of the carnival.

In Europe, 17-year-old Brigitte Bardot wore scanty bikinis (by contemporary standards) in the French film Manina, la fille sans voiles ("Manina, the girl unveiled"). The promotion for the film, released in France in March 1953, drew more attention to Bardot's bikinis than to the film itself. By the time the film was released in the United States in 1958, it was re-titled Manina, the Girl in the Bikini. Bardot was also photographed wearing a bikini on the beach during the 1957 Cannes Film Festival. Working with her husband and agent Roger Vadim, she garnered significant attention with photographs of her wearing a bikini on every beach in the south of France.

Similar photographs were taken of Anita Ekberg and Sophia Loren, among others. According to The Guardian, Bardot's photographs in particular turned Saint-Tropez into the beachwear capital of the world, with Bardot identified as the original Cannes bathing beauty. Bardot's photography helped to enhance the public profile of the festival, and Cannes in turn played a crucial role in her career.

A Samba dancer in a bikini at the Rio Carnival, 2009. The bikini tradition of Rio Carnival started in 1950.

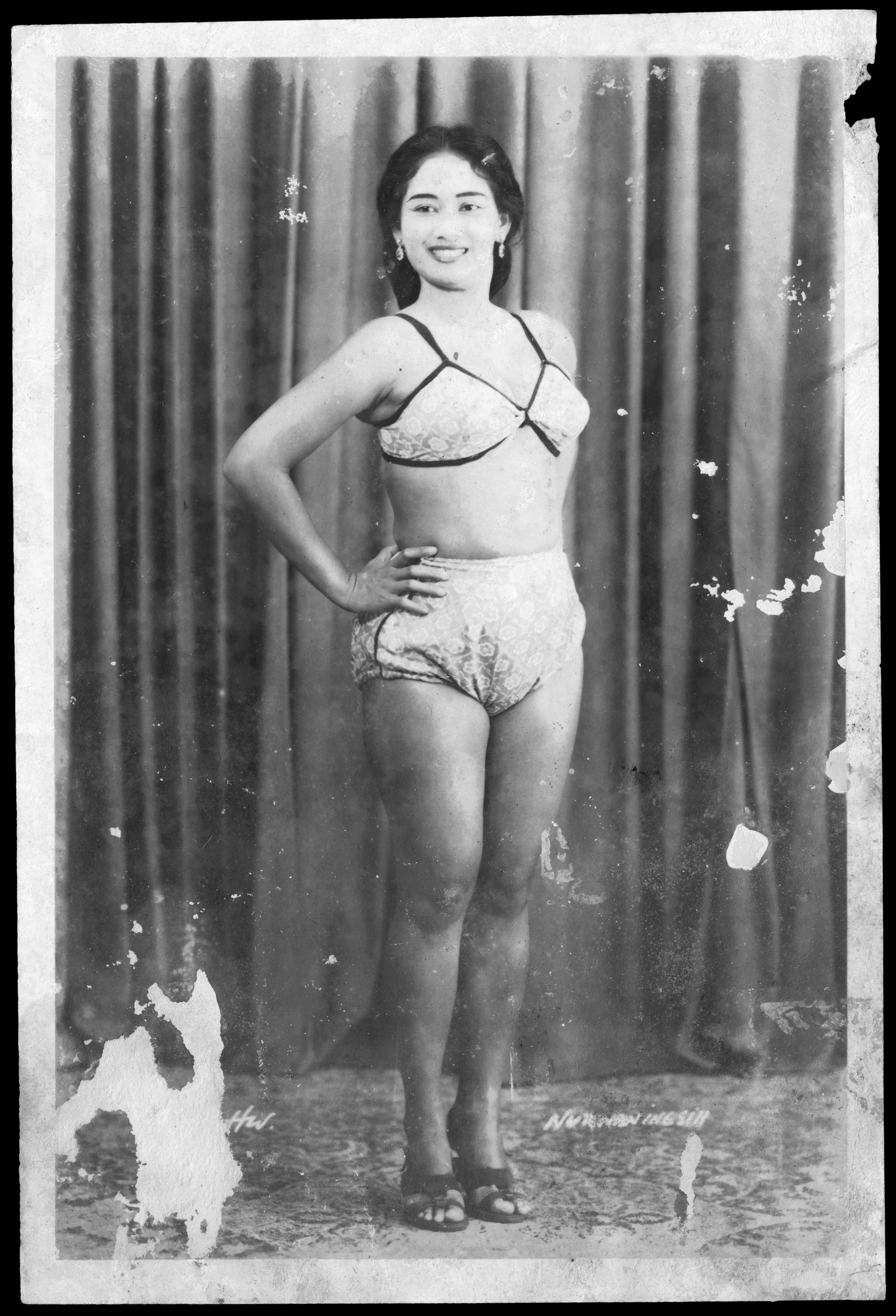
Indonesian actress Nurnaningsih, 1955.

Brian Hyland's novelty-song hit "Itsy Bitsy Teenie Weenie Yellow Polka Dot Bikini" became a Billboard No. 1 hit during the summer of 1960: the song tells a story about a young girl who is too shy to wear her new bikini on the beach, thinking it too risqué.

In 1961, "decades of tensions" between local authorities and women in Waverly, Australia escalated such that local media started referring to it as "the bikini war". Similar wars also "raged elsewhere in Sydney" at the time. This particular bikini war followed a "long weekend" in October of that year which saw the arrest of over 50 women on Bondi Beach, resulting from enforcement by beach inspectors of a 1935 ordinance which imposed strict measurement requirements on bathing suits. These requirements were replaced later that year with a requirement simply for “proper and adequate” swimsuits.

Playboy first featured a bikini on its cover in 1962; the Sports Illustrated Swimsuit Issue debut two years later featured Babette March in a white bikini on the cover. This has been credited with making the bikini a legitimate piece of clothing.

Ursula Andress, appearing as Honey Ryder in the 1962 British James Bond film, Dr. No, wore a white bikini, which became known as the "Dr. No bikini". It became one of the most famous bikinis of all time and an iconic moment in cinematic and fashion history. Andress said that she owed her career to that white bikini, remarking, "This bikini made me into a success. As a result of starring in Dr. No as the first Bond girl, I was given the freedom to take my pick of future roles and to become financially independent."

The bikini finally caught on, and in 1963, the movie Beach Party, starring Annette Funicello and Frankie Avalon, led a wave of films that made the bikini a pop-culture symbol, though Funicello was barred from wearing Réard's bikini unlike the other young women in the films. In 1965, a woman told Time that it was "almost square" not to wear a bikini; the magazine wrote two years later that "65% of the young set had already gone over".

Raquel Welch's fur bikini in One Million Years B.C. (1966) was noted as an iconic moment in cinema and a "definitive look of the 1960s". It made Welch a fashion icon; a photo of her in the bikini became a best-selling pinup poster.

In the 1960s, stretch nylon bikini briefs and bras complemented adolescent boutique fashions. DuPont introduced lycra (spandex), which enabled suits to fit like a second skin with simple construction and without heavy linings. "The advent of Lycra allowed more women to wear a bikini," wrote Kelly Killoren Bensimon, a former model and author of The Bikini Book, "It didn't sag, it didn't bag, and it concealed and revealed. It wasn't so much like lingerie anymore." This fabric allowed designers to create the string bikini, and allowed Rudi Gernreich to create the topless monokini. Alternative swimwear fabrics such as velvet, leather, and crocheted squares surfaced in the early '70s.

=== Mass acceptance ===
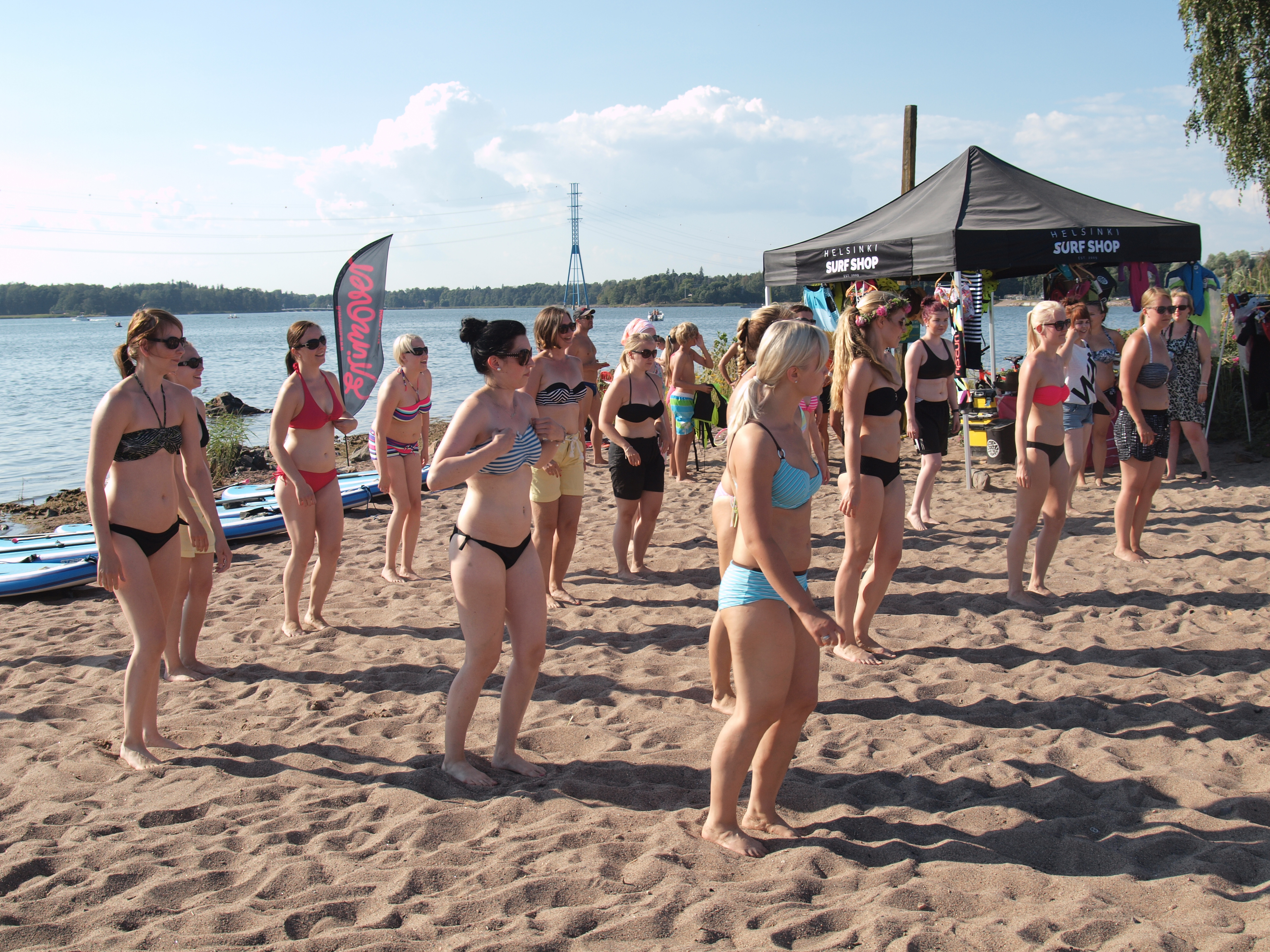
Women in bikinis at the Hietaniemi Beach in Helsinki, Finland, in 2014.

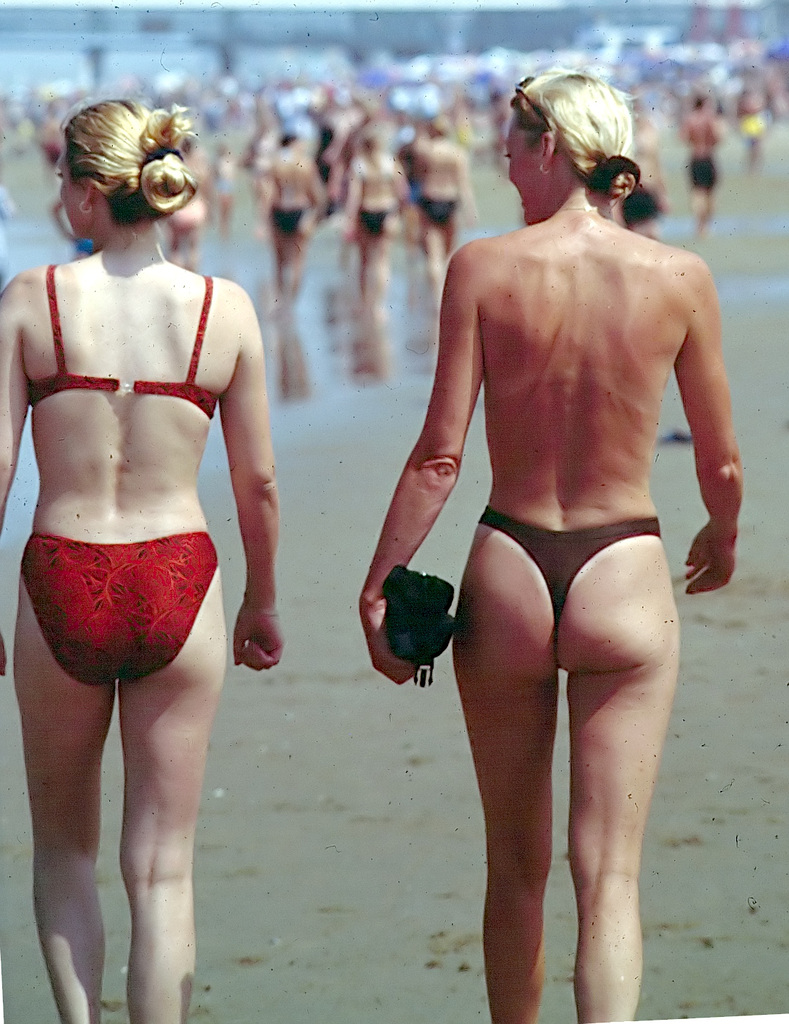
Two women in bikinis on a Holland beach in 1999

Réard's company folded in 1988, four years after his death. Meanwhile, the bikini had become the most popular beachwear around the globe. According to French fashion historian Olivier Saillard, this was due to "the power of women, and not the power of fashion". By 1988 the bikini made up nearly 20% of swimsuit sales, more than any other model in the US, though one-piece suits made a comeback during the 1980s and early 1990s. In 1997, Miss Maryland Jamie Fox became the first contestant in 50 years to compete in a two-piece swimsuit at the Miss America Pageant. Actresses in action films like Blue Crush (2002) and Charlie's Angels: Full Throttle (2003) made the two-piece "the millennial equivalent of the power suit", according to Gina Bellafonte of The New York Times.According to Beth Dincuff Charleston, research associate at the Costume Institute of the Metropolitan Museum of Art, "The bikini represents a social leap involving body consciousness, moral concerns, and sexual attitudes." By the early 2000s, bikinis had become a $811 million business annually, according to the NPD Group, a consumer and retail information company, and had boosted spin-off services like bikini waxing and the sun tanning industries. The first bikini museum in the world is being built in Bad Rappenau in Germany. The development of swimwear from 1880 to the present is presented on 2,000 square metres of exhibition space.

By 2017, the global swimwear market was valued at US$18,5 billion with a compound annual growth rate of 6.2%. Part of the increased consumption of bikinis and swimwears can be attributed to influencers who promote and endorse various brands around the year. Soccer player and best selling author Mo Isom describes it as, "We're flooded with Instagram bikini pics." It was estimated in 2016 that in 2019 the USA would be the largest swimwear market (US$10 billion), followed by Europe (US$5 billion), Asia–Pacific (US$4 billion) and Middle East and Africa (about 1 billion).

Evolution of bikinis
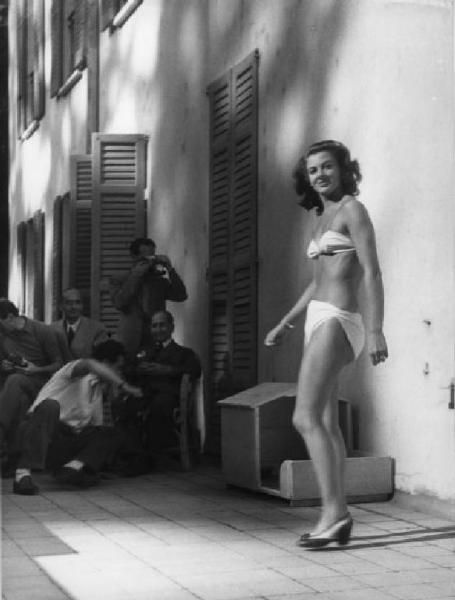
1940s

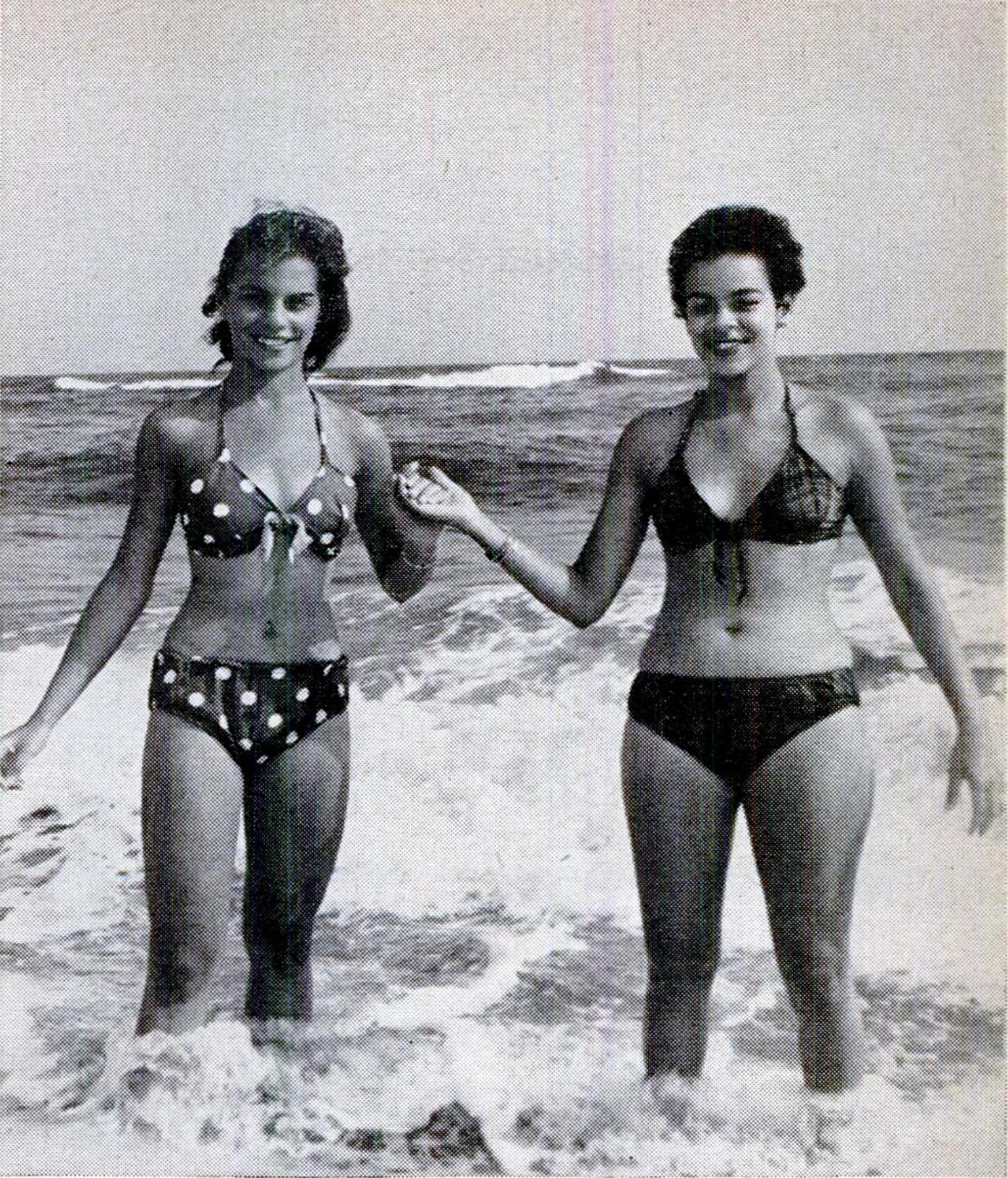
1950s

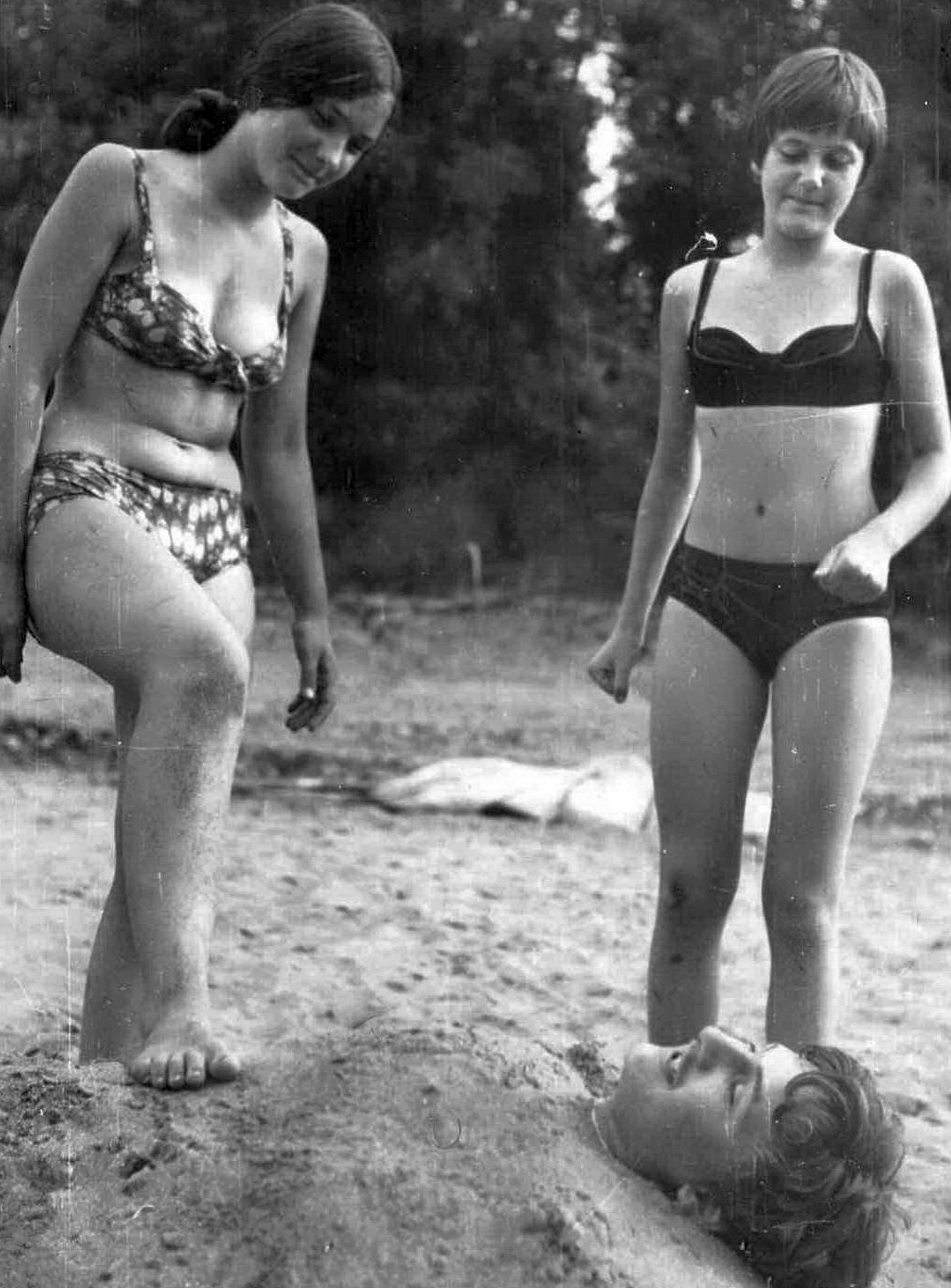
1960s

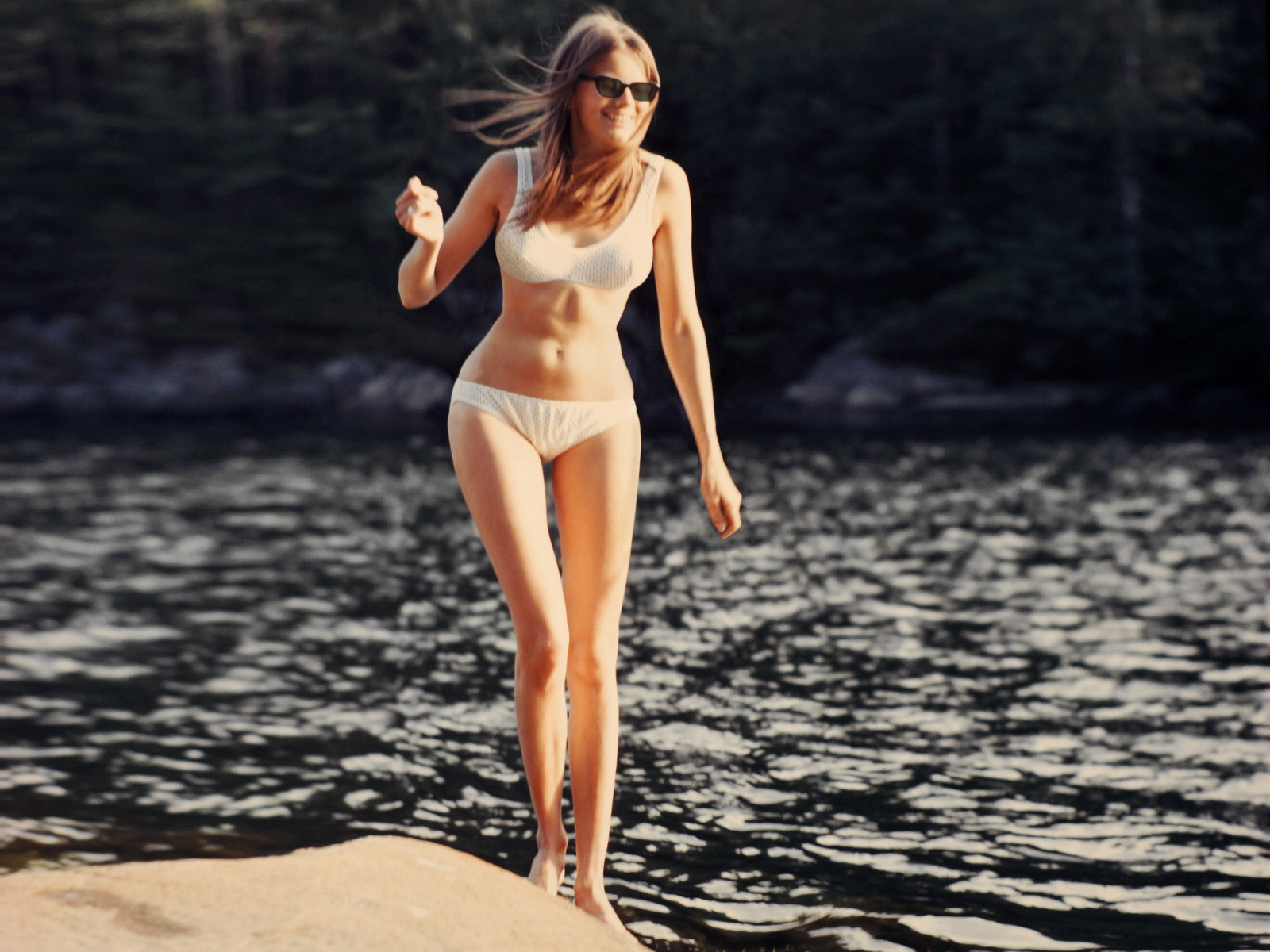
1970s

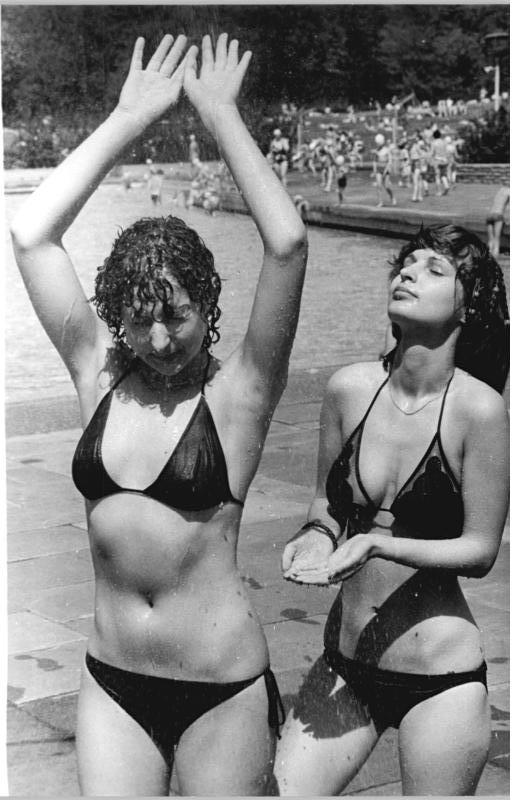
1980s

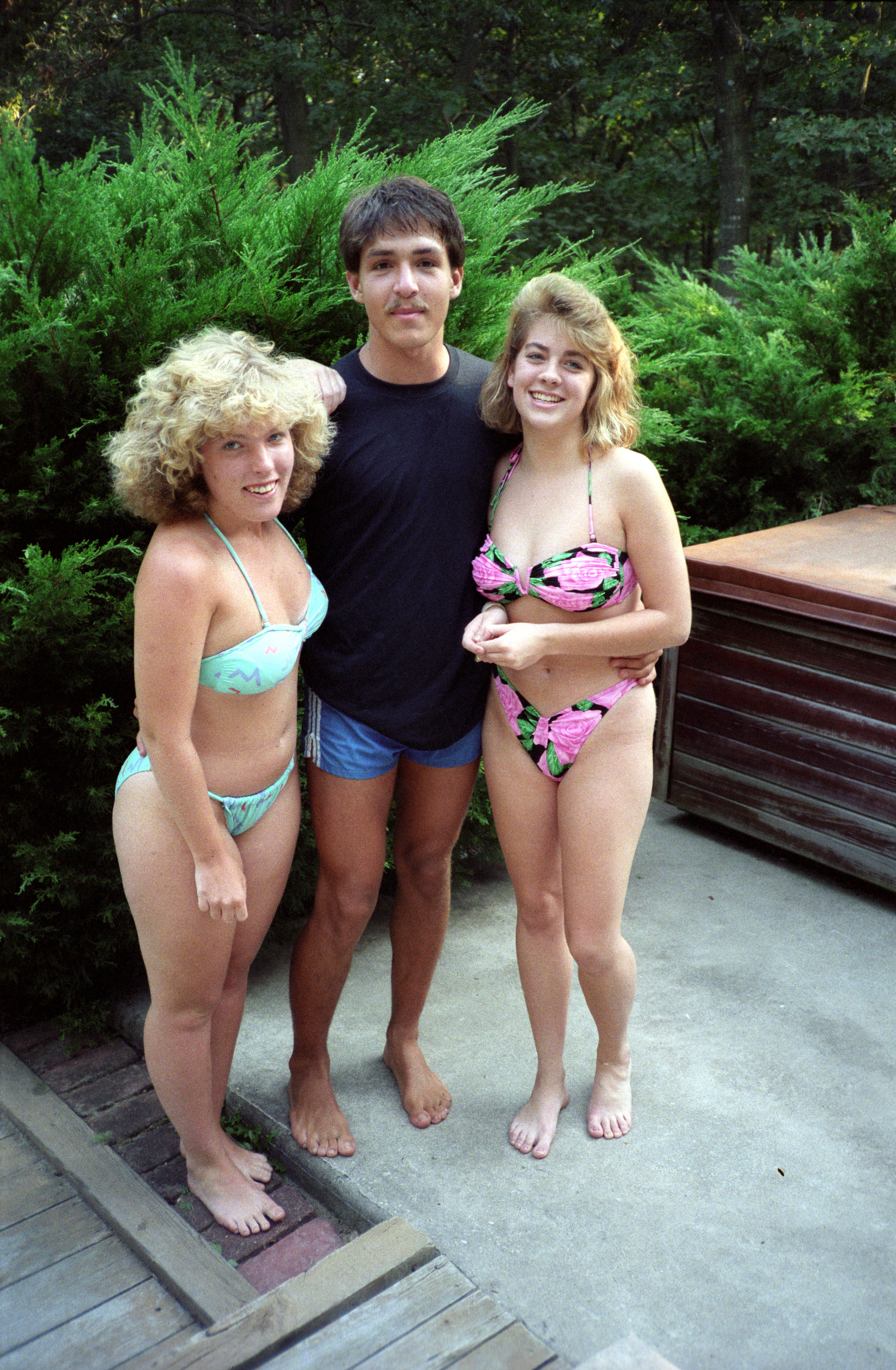
1990s

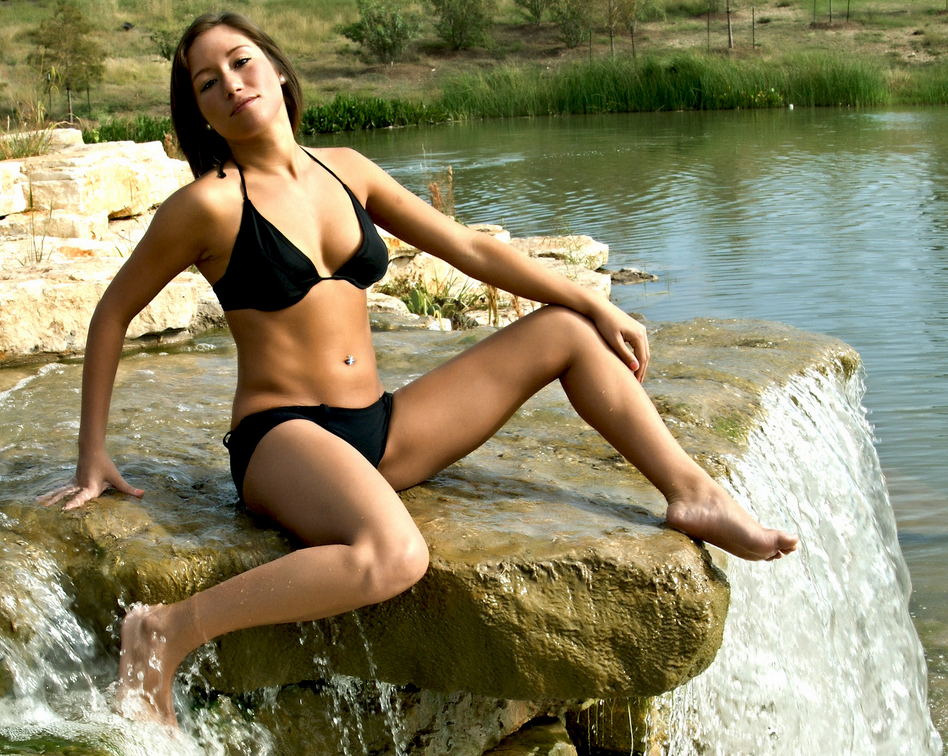
2000s

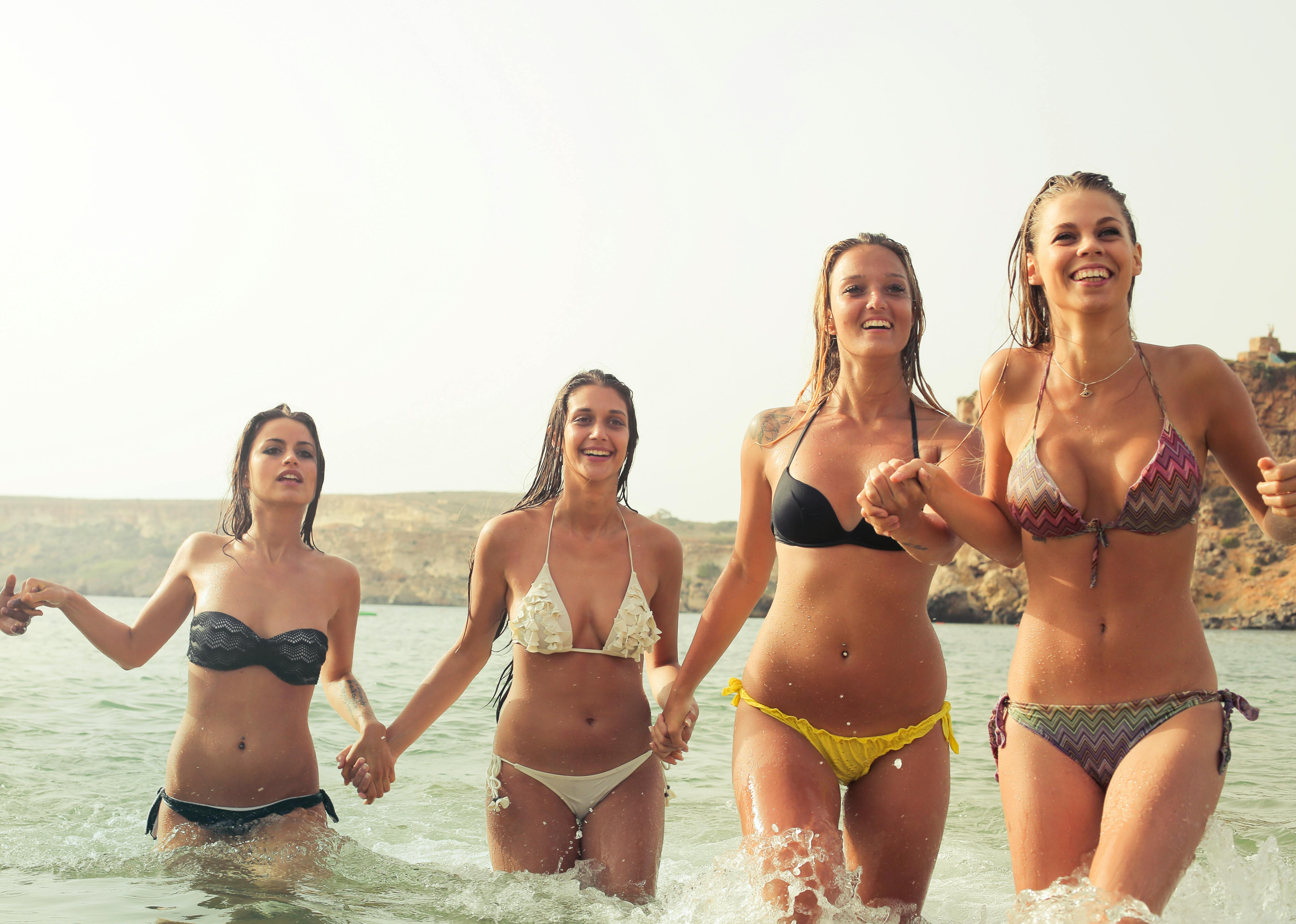
2010s

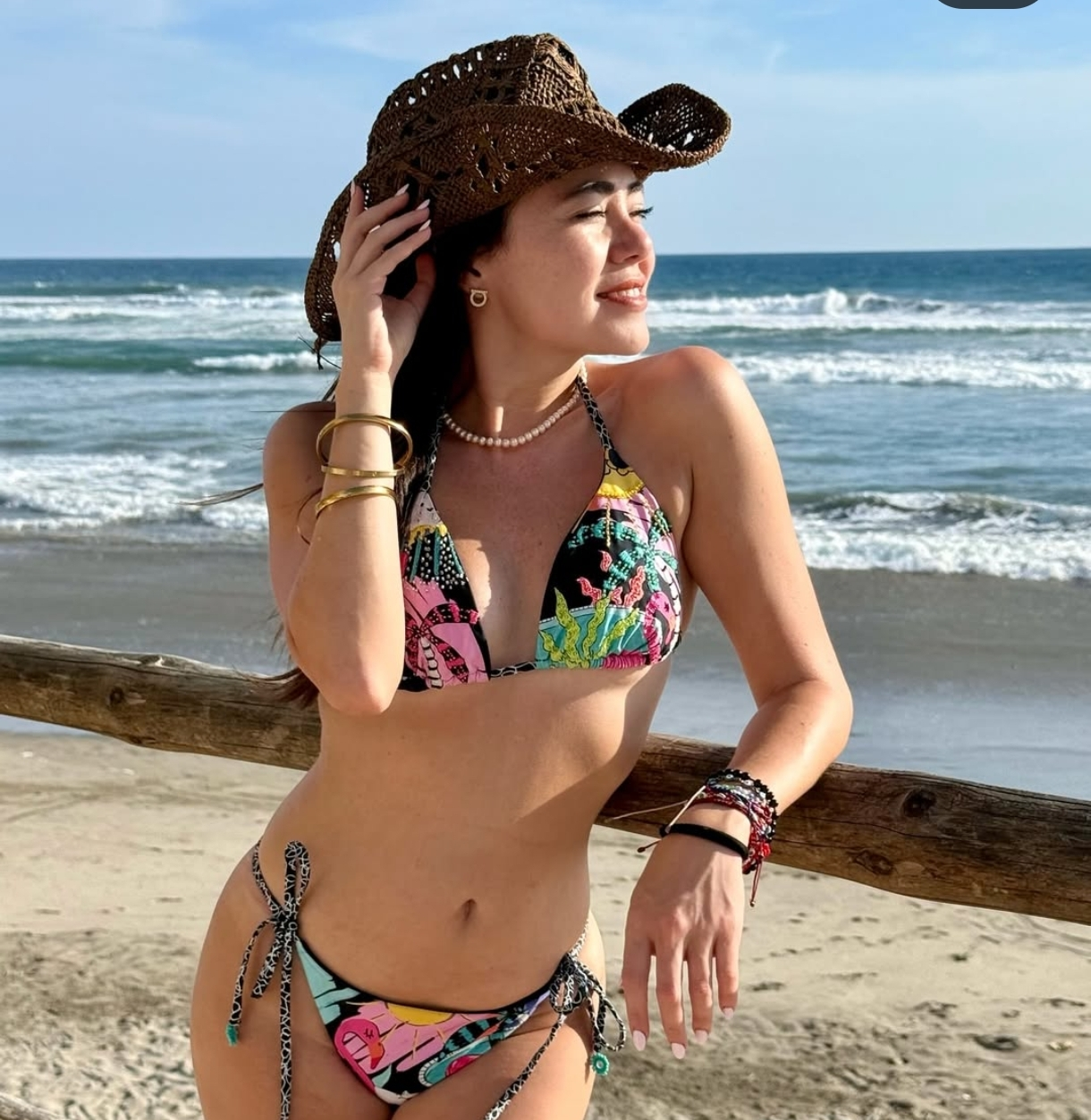
2020s

=== Outside the Western world ===
==== South Asia ====
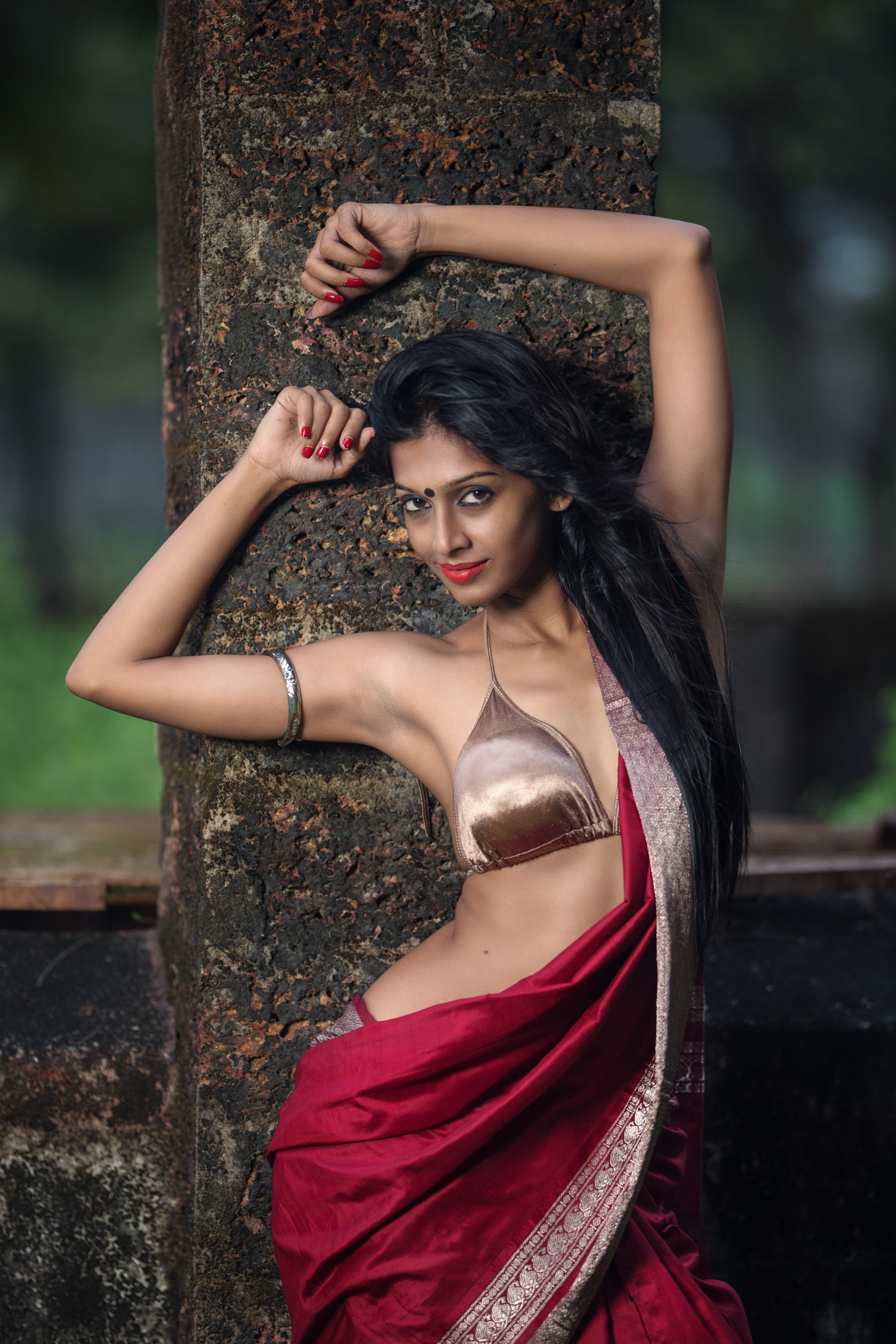
Indian model wearing bikini with saree.

The 1967 Bollywood film An Evening in Paris is mostly remembered because it featured actress Sharmila Tagore as the first Indian actress to wear a bikini on film. She also posed in a bikini for the glossy Filmfare magazine. The costume shocked a conservative Indian audience, but it also set in motion a trend carried forward by Zeenat Aman in Heera Panna (1973) and Qurbani (1980), Dimple Kapadia in Bobby (1973), and Parveen Babi in Yeh Nazdeekiyan (1982). Indonesian actress Nurnaningsih's bikini clad photos were widely distributed in early 1950s, though she was banned in Kalimantan.

Indian women generally wear bikinis when they vacation abroad or in Goa without the family. But, despite the conservative ideas prevalent in India, bikinis also become more popular in summer when women, from Bollywood stars to the middle class, take up swimming, often in a public space. A lot of tankinis, shorts and single-piece swimsuits are sold in the summer, along with real bikinis and bandeaukinis. The maximum sales for bikinis happen in the winter, the honeymoon season. For more coverage, designers Shivan Bhatiya and Narresh Kukreja invented the bikini-saree popularised by TV anchor Mandira Bedi.

==== East Asia ====
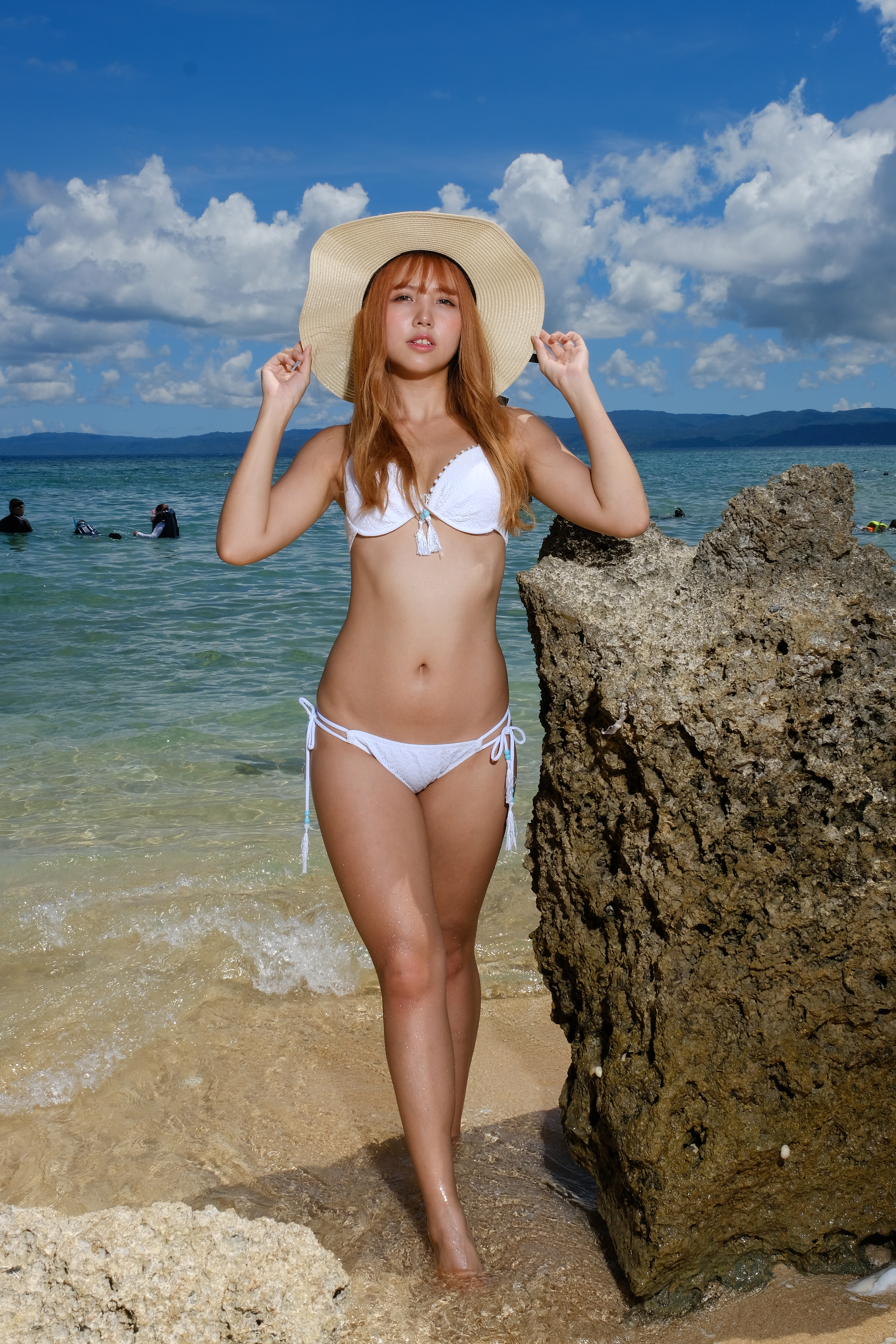
A young woman wearing a white bikini in Okinawa, Japan

By the end of the first decade of the 21st century, the Chinese bikini industry became a serious international threat for the Brazilian bikini industry. Huludao, Liaoning, China set the world record for the largest bikini parade in 2012, with 1,085 participants and a photo shoot involving 3,090 women. "Beijing bikini" refers to the Chinese urban practice of men rolling up their shirts to expose their midriff to cool off in public in the summer. In Japan, wearing a bikini is common on the beach and at baths or pools. But, according to a 2013 study, 94% women are not body confident enough to wear a bikini in public without resorting to sarongs, zip-up sweatshirts, T-shirts, or shorts. Japanese women also often wear a "facekini" to protect their face from sunburns.

==== Middle East ====
In most parts of the Middle East, bikinis are either banned or are highly controversial. On March 18, 1973, when Lebanese magazine Ash-Shabaka printed a bikini-clad woman on the cover, they had to make a second version with only the face of the model. In 2011, when Huda Naccache (Miss Earth 2011) posed for the cover of Lilac (based in Israel), she became the first bikini-clad Arab model on the cover of an Arabic magazine. Lebanese-Australian fashion designer Aheda Zanetti created the "burkini" as a modest option to the bikini, which has become very popular among Muslims. Rehab Shaaban, an Egyptian designer, tried an even more abaya-like design, but her design was banned due to safety reasons.

== Variants ==
While the name "bikini" was at first applied only to beachwear that revealed the wearer's navel, today the fashion industry considers any two-piece swimsuit a bikini. Modern bikini fashions are characterized by a simple, brief design: two triangles of fabric that form a bra and cover the woman's breasts and a third that forms a panty cut below the navel that covers the groin and the intergluteal cleft.

Bikinis can and have been made out of almost every possible clothing material, and the fabrics and other materials used to make bikinis are an essential element of their design. Modern bikinis were first made of cotton and jersey, but in the 1960s, Lycra became the common material. Alternative swimwear fabrics such as velvet, leather, and crocheted squares surfaced in the early 1970s.

In a single fashion show in 1985, there were two-piece suits with cropped tank tops instead of the usual skimpy bandeaux, suits that resembled bikinis from the front and one-pieces from the back, suspender straps, ruffles, and deep navel-baring cutouts. Metal and stone jewelry pieces are now often used to dress up look and style according to tastes. To meet the fast pace of demands, some manufacturers now offer made-to-order bikinis ready in as few as seven minutes. The world's most expensive bikini was designed in February 2006 by Susan Rosen; containing 150 carats (30 g) of diamond, it was valued at £20 million.

=== Major styles ===
There is a range of distinct bikini styles available — string/tie-side bikinis, monokinis (topless or top and bottom connected), trikinis (three pieces instead of two), tankinis (tank top, bikini bottom), camikinis (camisole top, bikini bottom), bandeaukinis (bandeau top, bikini bottom), skirtinis (bikini top, skirt bottom), microkinis, sling bikinis (or suspender bikinis), thong and g-string bikinis, and teardrop bikinis.

Variant	Image	Year	Description
Bandeaukini		—	A bandeaukini (alternatively called a bandini) is a bandeau top (no straps going over the shoulders) worn with any bikini bottom. It is the oldest form of bikini, with one of the earliest examples found in Sicilian Villa Romana del Casale (dubbed the "Bikini Girls"), dating back to the 4th century AD. Reintroduced, its appeal grew fast among young women, with bandeau tops edging into the sales of the classic tankini.
Monokini		1964	A monokini (also called topless swimsuit, unikini or numokini) is a women's one-piece garment equivalent to the lower half of a bikini. The design was originally conceived by Rudi Gernreich in 1964. An extreme version of the monokini, the thong-style pubikini (which exposed the pubic region), was also designed by Gernreich in 1985. Today, monokinis usually refer to swimsuits in which the top and bottom are connected but provide coverage of the breasts as to be accepted in most western cultures.
Trikini		1967	The trikini appeared briefly in 1967, defined as "a handkerchief and two small saucers." It reappeared in the 1990s as a bikini bottom with a stringed halter of two triangular pieces covering the breasts, and in the 2000s as a costume of three separate pieces. The trikini top comes essentially in two separate parts. The name of this woman's bathing suit is formed from the word "bikini", replacing "bi-", meaning "two", with "tri-", meaning "three". In a variation the three pieces are sold as part of one continuous garment.
String bikini		1974	A string bikini (or a tie-side bikini) gets its name from its design that consists of two triangular shaped pieces connected at the groin but not at the sides, where a thin "string" wraps around the waist tied together to connect the two parts. The structure of the side tie bottom leaves the hips bare. The first formal presentation of string bikini was done by fashion model Brandi Perret-DuJon, for the opening of Le Petite Centre, a shopping area in the French Quarter of the New Orleans, Louisiana in 1974. String bikinis are one of the most popular variations of bikini.
Sling bikini		—	The sling bikini (also known as sling-kini, onepiecekini or sling swimsuit) is an unbroken suit, technically one-piece, which resembles a bikini bottom with the side straps extending upwards to cover the breasts and go over the shoulders, or encircling the neck while a second set of straps pass around the midriff (also known as pretzel bikini or pretzel swimsuit). Sling swimsuits emerged in the early 1990s, and were introduced into the mainstream in 1994. When designed for or worn by a man, it is called a mankini, popularized by Sacha Baron Cohen in the film Borat.
Microkini		1995	A microkini, also known as a micro bikini, is an exceptionally meager bikini. The designs for both women and men typically use only enough fabric to cover the genitals and, for women, the nipples. Some variations of the microkini use adhesive or wire to hold the fabric in place over the genitals. Microkinis keep the wearer just within legal limits of decency and fill a niche between nudism and conservative swimwear. They are often accepted in Western cultures, including in Europe and the United States; however, they are considered inappropriate in more conservative nations and/or in family settings.
Tankini		1998	The tankini is a swimsuit combining a tank top and a bikini bottom. Tankinis can be made of spandex-and-cotton or Lycra-and-nylon. Designer Anne Cole, the US swimwear mogul, was the originator of this style in 1998. A variation is named camkini, with spaghetti straps instead of tank-shaped straps over a bikini bottom.
Skirtini		—	The skirtini, which features a bikini top and a small, skirted bottom, is also an innovation for bikini-style clothes with more coverage. Two-piece swimsuits with skirt panels were popular in the US before the government ordered a 10% reduction in fabric used in woman's swimwear in 1943 as wartime rationing. In 2011, The Daily Telegraph identified the skirted bikini as one of the top 10 swimwear designs of that season.

== In sport ==
Bikinis have become a major component of marketing various women's sports. It is an official uniform for beach volleyball and is widely worn in athletics and other sports. Sports bikinis have gained popularity since the 1990s. However, the trend has raised significant criticism in recent years among people who view it as an attempt to sell sex. Female swimmers do not commonly wear bikinis in competitive swimming. The International Swimming Federation (FINA) voted to prohibit female swimmers from racing in bikinis in its meeting at Rome in 1960, but modern FINA bylaws hasn't such prohibition.

=== Beach volleyball ===
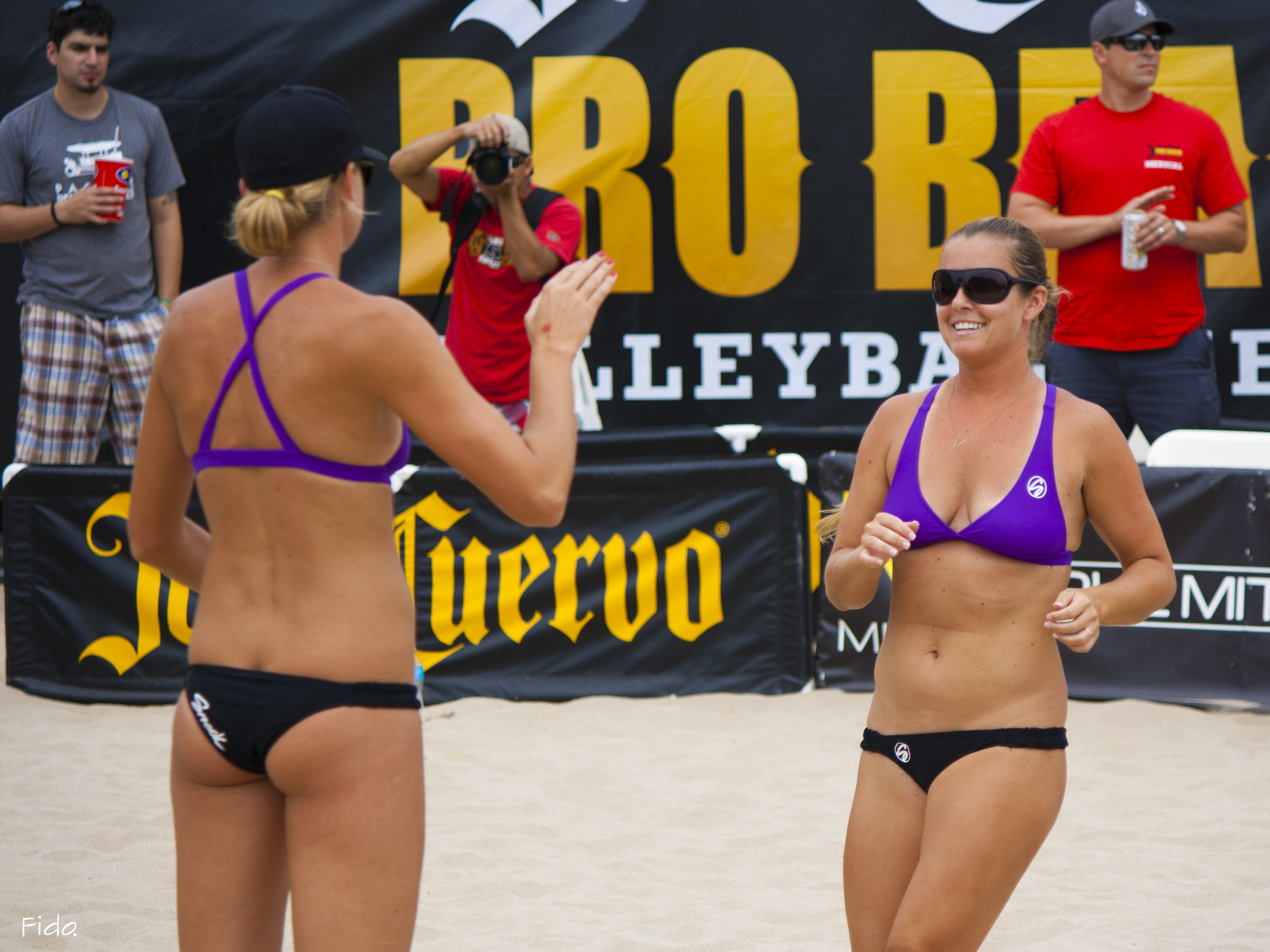
US women's beach volleyball team has cited several advantages to bikini uniforms, such as comfort while playing on sand during hot weather. Photo shows US beach volleyball players Jennifer Fopma and Brooke Sweat in their uniforms.

In 1994, the bikini became the official uniform of women's Olympic beach volleyball. In 1999, the International Volleyball Federation (FIVB) standardized beach volleyball uniforms, with the bikini becoming the required uniform for women. That regulation bottom is called a "bun-hugger", and players names are often written on the back of the bottom.

The uniform made its Olympic debut at Bondi Beach, Sydney during the 2000 Summer Olympics amid some criticism. It was the fifth-largest television audience of all the sports at the 2000 Games. Much of the interest was attributed to the sex appeal of bikini-clad players, along with their athletic ability. Bikini-clad dancers and cheerleaders entertain the audience during match breaks in many beach volleyball tournaments, including the Olympics. Indoor volleyball costumes followed suit, becoming smaller and tighter.

Some sports officials criticized the FIVB uniform as exploitative and impractical in colder weather. It also drew the ire of some athletes. At the 2006 Asian Games at Doha, Qatar, only one Muslim country – Iraq – fielded a team in the beach volleyball competition because of concerns that the uniform was inappropriate. They refused to wear bikinis. The weather during the evening games in 2012 London Olympics was so cold that some players wore shirts and leggings. Earlier in 2012, FIVB had announced it would allow shorts (maximum length 3 cm (1.2 in) above the knee) and sleeved tops at games. Richard Baker, the federation spokesperson, said that "many of these countries have religious and cultural requirements so the uniform needed to be more flexible".

The bikini remains preferred by most players and corporate sponsors. The US women's team has cited several advantages of bikini uniforms, such as comfort while playing on sand during hot weather. Competitors Natalie Cook and Holly McPeak support the bikini as a practical uniform for a sport played on sand during the heat of summer. Olympic gold medal winner Kerry Walsh said, "I love our uniforms." According to fellow gold medalist Misty May-Treanor and Walsh, it does not restrict movement.

One feminist viewpoint sees the bikini uniform as objectification of women athletes. US beach volleyball player Gabrielle Reece described the bikini bottoms as uncomfortable with constant "yanking and fiddling." Many female beach volleyball players have sustained injuries by over-training the abdominal muscles while many others have gone through augmentation mammoplasty to look appealing in their uniforms. Australian competitor Nicole Sanderson said about match break entertainment that "it's kind of disrespectful to the female players. I'm sure the male spectators love it, but I find it a little bit offensive."

Sports journalism expert Kimberly Bissell conducted a study on the camera angles used during the 2004 Summer Olympics beach volleyball games. Bissell found that 20% of the camera angles were focused on the women's chests, and 17% on their buttocks. Bissell theorized that the appearance of the players draws fans attention more than their actual athleticism. Sports commentator Jeanne Moos commented, "Beach volleyball has now joined go-go girl dancing as perhaps the only two professions where a bikini is the required uniform." British Olympian Denise Johns argues that the regulation uniform is intended to be "sexy" and to attract attention. Rubén Acosta, president of the FIVB, says that it makes the game more appealing to spectators.

=== Bodybuilding ===
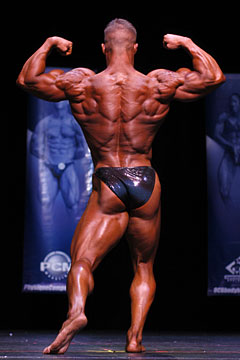
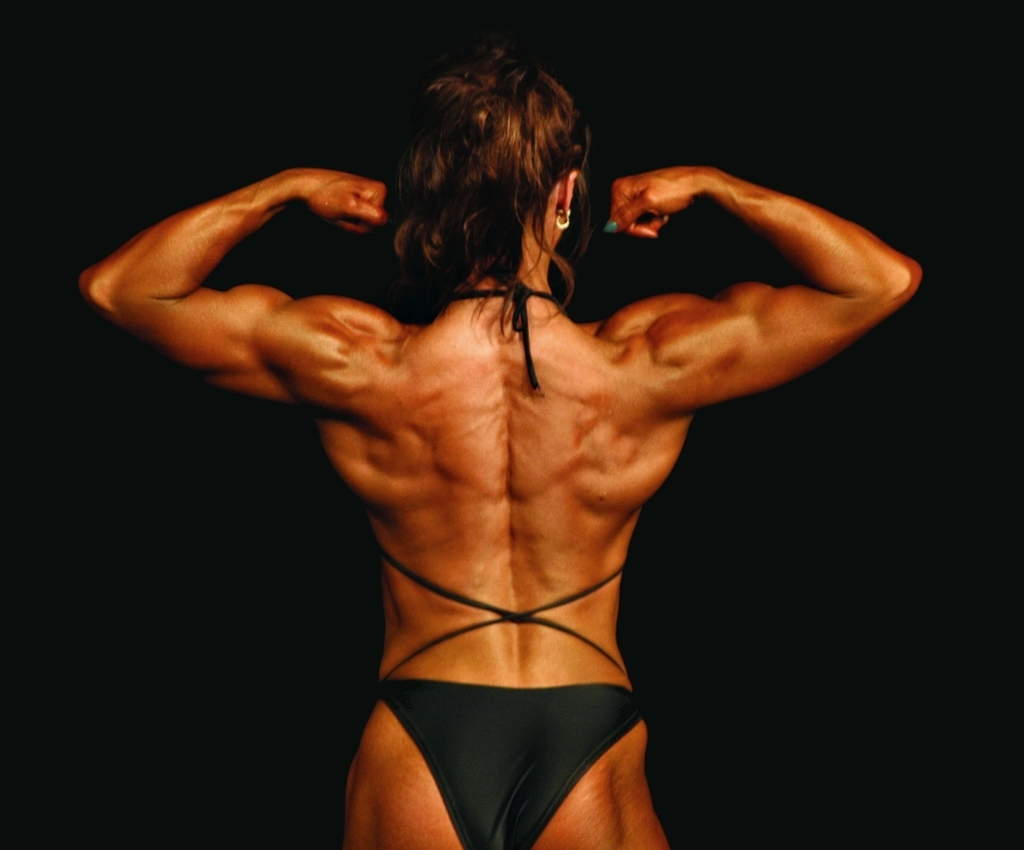
Bikini is the uniform for both male and female bodybuilders.

From the 1950s to mid-1970s, men's bodybuilding contest formats were often supplemented with women's beauty contests or bikini shows. The winners earned titles like Miss Body Beautiful, Miss Physical Fitness and Miss Americana, and also presented trophies to the winners of the men's contest. In the 1980s, the Ms Olympia competition started in the US and in the UK the NABBA (National Amateur Body Building Association) renamed Miss Bikini International to Ms Universe. In 1986, the Ms Universe competition was divided into two sections – "physique" (for a more muscular physique) and "figure" (traditional feminine presentation in high heels). In November 2010 the IFBBF (International Federation of BodyBuilding & Fitness) introduced a women's bikini contest for women who do not wish to build their muscles to figure competition levels.

Costumes are regulation "posing trunks" (bikini briefs) for both men and women. Female bodybuilders in America are prohibited from wearing thongs or T-back swimsuits in contests filmed for television, though they are allowed to do so by certain fitness organizations in closed events. For men, the dress code specifies "swim trunks only (no shorts, cut-off pants, or Speedos)."

=== Other sports ===
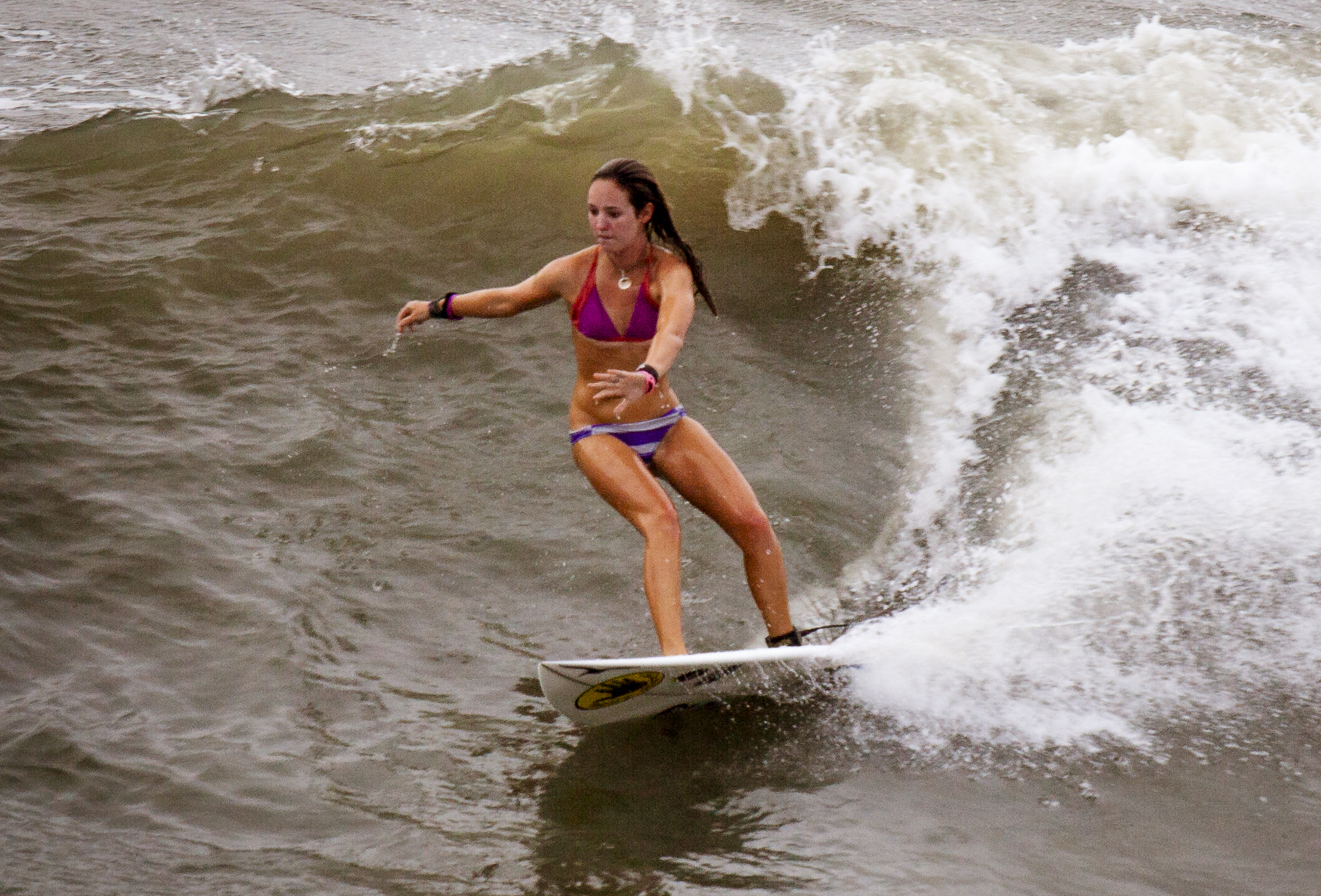
Surfing in a bikini

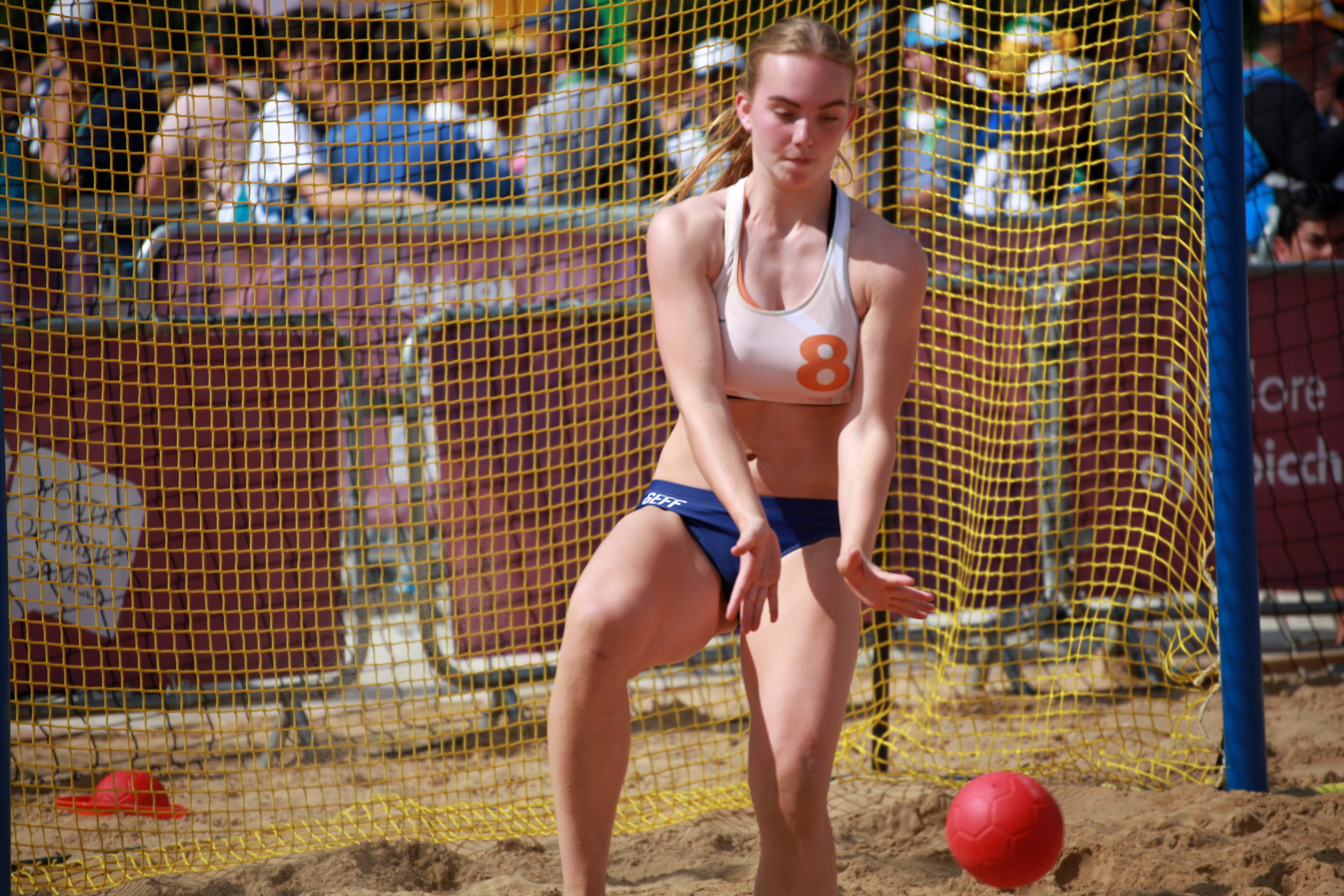
Beach Handball in a bikini

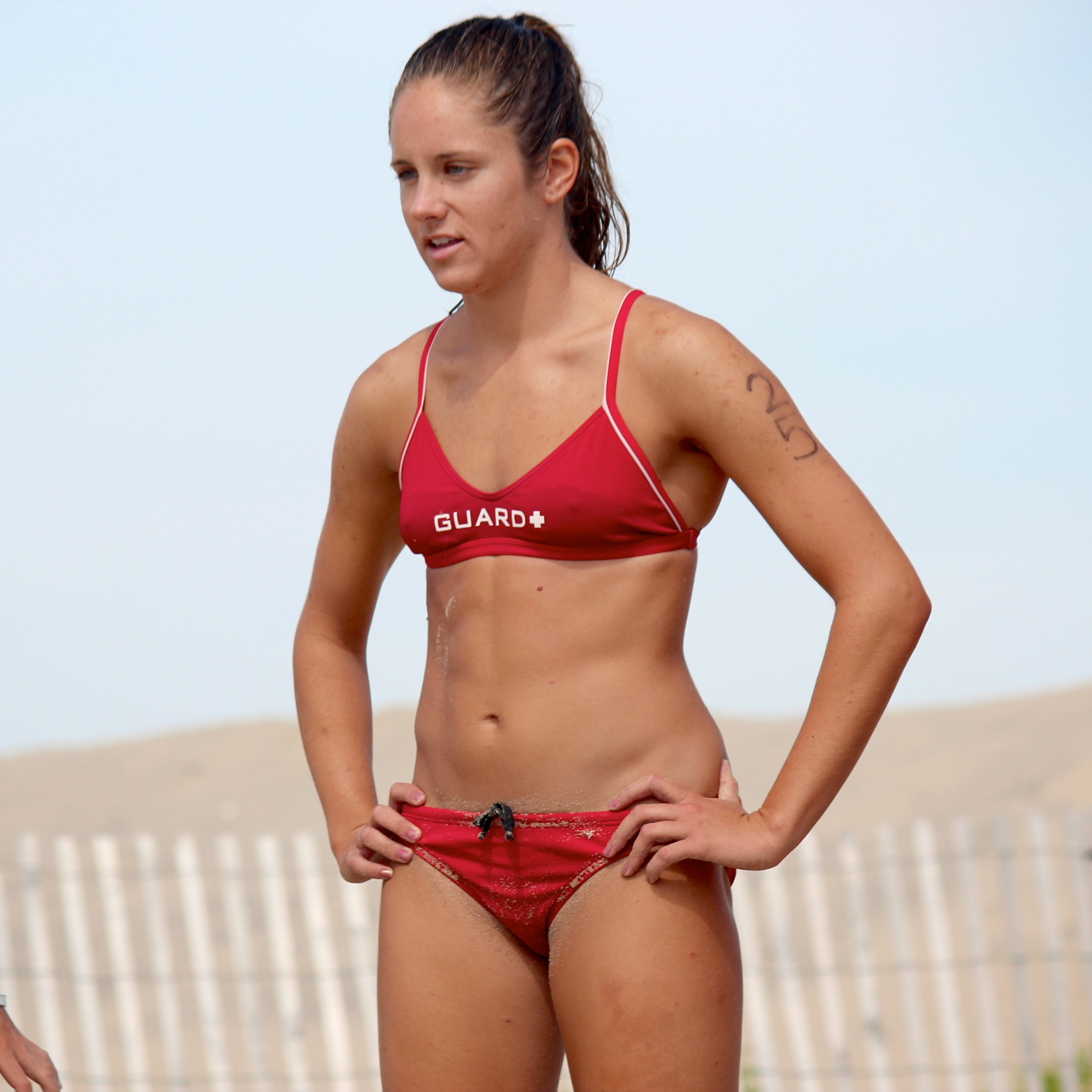
Lifeguard in a bikini

Women in athletics often wear bikinis of similar size as those worn in beach volleyball. Amy Acuff, a US high-jumper, wore a black leather bikini instead of a track suit at the 2000 Summer Olympics. Runner Florence Griffith-Joyner mixed bikini bottoms with one-legged tights at the 1988 Summer Olympics, earning her more attention than her record-breaking performance in the women's 200 meters event. In the 2007 South Pacific Games, the rules were adjusted to allow players to wear less revealing shorts and cropped sports tops instead of bikinis. At the 2006 Asian Games, organizers banned bikini-bottoms for female athletes and asked them to wear long shorts.

String bikinis and other revealing clothes are common in surfing, though most surfing bikinis are more robust with more coverage than sunning bikinis. Surfing Magazine printed a pictorial of Kymberly Herrin, Playboy Playmate March 1981, surfing in a revealing bikini, and eventually started an annual bikini issue. The Association of Surfing Professionals often pairs female surf meets with bikini contests, an issue that divides the female pro-surfing community into two parts. It has often been more profitable to win the bikini contest than the female surfing event.

In 2021, the Norway women's national beach handball team was fined €1500 for being improperly dressed after the women wore bike shorts instead of bikini bottoms at a European championship match in Bulgaria. Critics derided the fine and the underlying rule. Norway's minister for culture and sport Abid Raja described the fine as being "completely ridiculous". Former tennis champion Billie Jean King supported the team tweeting "The sexualisation of women athletes must stop". Although the Norwegian Handball Federation announced they would pay the fines, pop singer Pink offered to pay for them. Later, in November 2021, the International Handball Federation changed their dress rules to allow female players to wear some kinds of shorts, specifying "Female athletes must wear short tight pants with a close fit".

== Body ideals ==
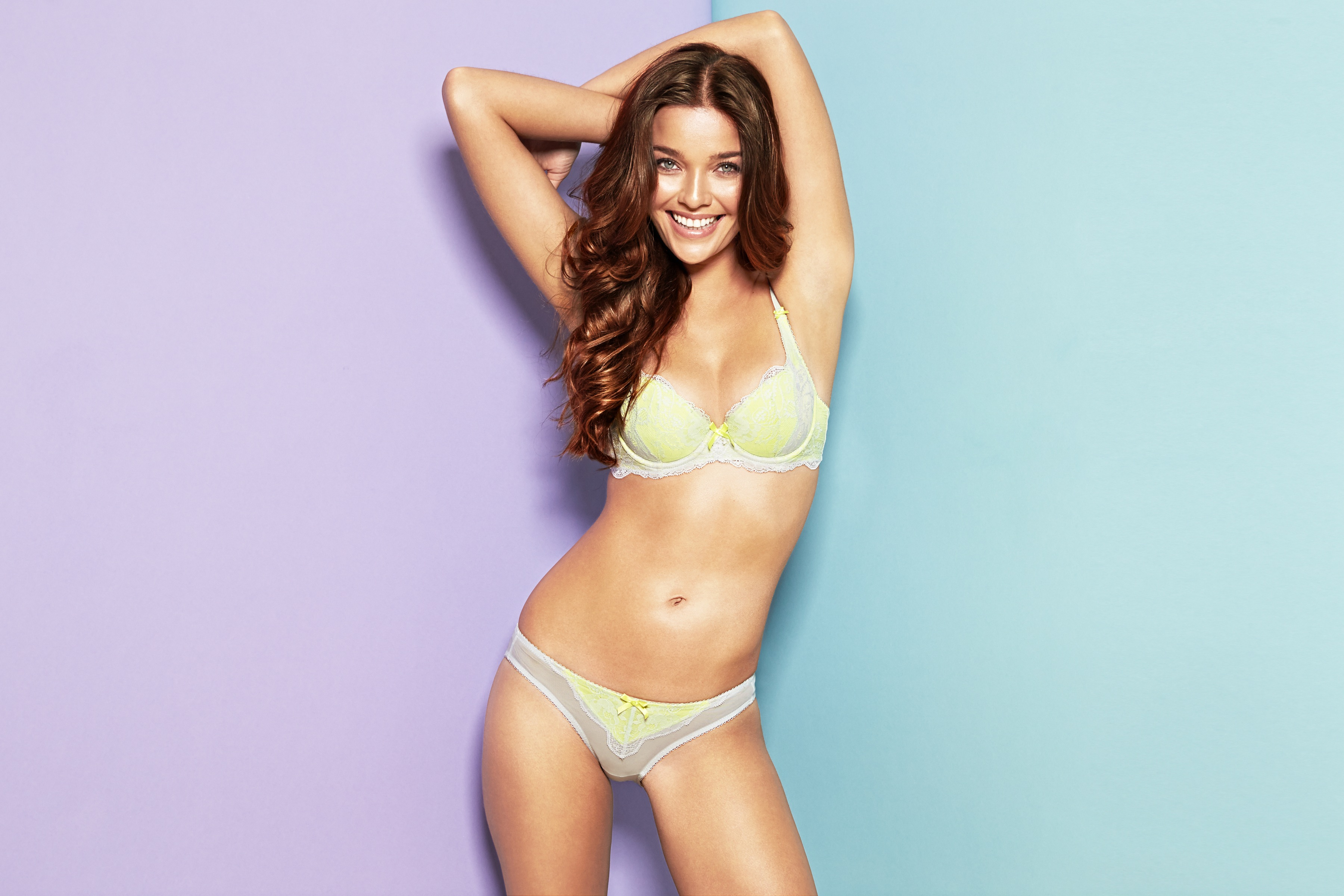
A model poses in garments from Elle Macpherson's underwear line. Nicknamed "The Body" by Time, Macpherson epitomized the bikini body ideal as a six-time Sports Illustrated Swimsuit Issue cover model.

In 1950, American swimsuit mogul Fred Cole, owner of Cole of California, told Time that bikinis were designed for "diminutive Gallic women", as because "French girls have short legs... swimsuits have to be hiked up at the sides to make their legs look longer." In 1961, The New York Times reported the opinion that the bikini is permissible for people who are not "too fat or too thin". In the 1960s etiquette writer Emily Post decreed that "[A bikini] is for perfect figures only, and for the very young." In The Bikini Book by Kelly Killoren Bensimon, swimwear designer Norma Kamali says, "Anyone with a tummy" should not wear a bikini. Since then, a number of bikini designers including Malia Mills have encouraged women of all ages and body types to take up the style. The 1970s saw the rise of the lean ideal of female body and figures like Cheryl Tiegs. Her figure remained in vogue in the 21st century.

The fitness boom of the 1980s led to one of the biggest leaps in the evolution of the bikini. According to Mills, "The leg line became superhigh, the front was superlow, and the straps were superthin." Women's magazines used terms like "Bikini Belly", and workout programs were launched to develop a "bikini-worthy body". The tiny "fitness-bikinis" made of lycra were launched to cater to this hardbodied ideal. Movies like Blue Crush and TV reality shows like Surf Girls merged the concepts of bikini models and athletes together, further accentuating the toned body ideal. Motivated by yearly Spring Break festivities that mark the start of the bikini season in North America, many women diet in an attempt to achieve the ideal bikini body; some take this to extremes including self-starvation, leading to eating disorders.

In 1993, Suzy Menkes, then Fashion Editor of the International Herald Tribune, suggested that women had begun to "revolt" against the "body ideal" and bikini "exposure." She wrote, "Significantly, on the beaches as on the streets, some of the youngest and prettiest women (who were once the only ones who dared to bare) seem to have decided that exposure is over." Nevertheless, former professional beach volleyball player Gabrielle Reece, who competed in a bikini, claimed that "confidence" alone can make a bikini sexy. One survey commissioned by Diet Chef, a UK home delivery service, reported by The Today Show and ridiculed by More magazine, showed that women should stop wearing bikinis by the age of 47.

== Bikini underwear ==
Certain types of underwear are described as bikini underwear and are designed for men and women. For women, bikini or bikini-style underwear is underwear that is similar in size and form to a regular bikini. It can refer to virtually any undergarment that provides less coverage to the midriff than lingerie, panties or knickers, especially suited to clothing such as crop tops. For men, bikini briefs are underpants that resemble women's bikini bottoms, being smaller and more revealing than men's classic briefs. Men's bikini briefs can be low- or high-side that are usually lower than the true waist, often at hips, and usually have no access pouch or flap, nor leg bands at tops of thighs. String bikini briefs have front and rear sections that meet in the crotch but not at the waistband, with no fabric on the side of the legs.

Swimwear and underwear have similar design considerations, both being form-fitting garments. The main difference is that, unlike underwear, swimwear is open to public view. The swimsuit was, and is, following underwear styles, and at about the same time that attitudes towards the bikini began to change, underwear underwent a redesign towards a minimal, unboned design that emphasized comfort first.

=== History ===
Women's underwear

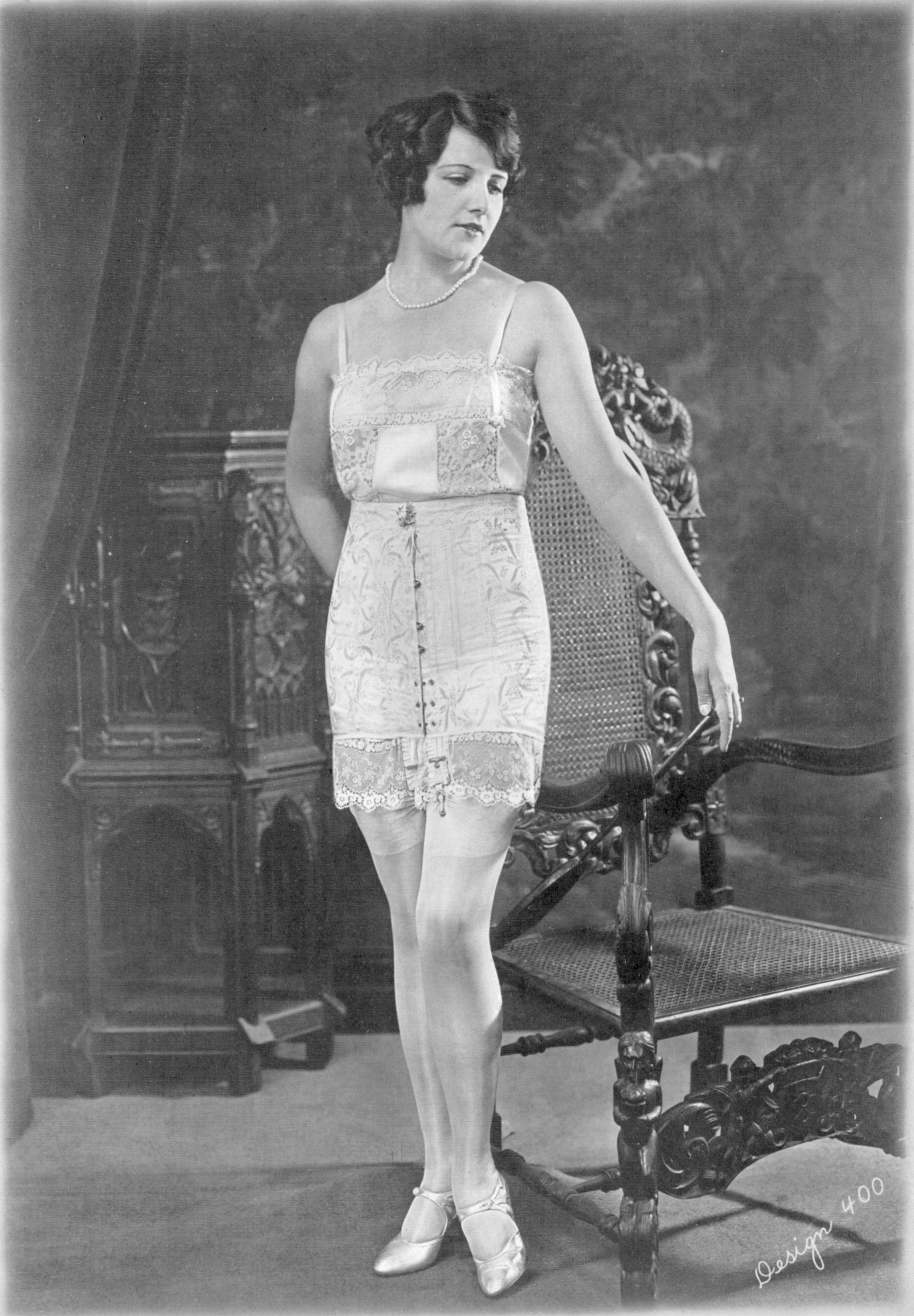
1927

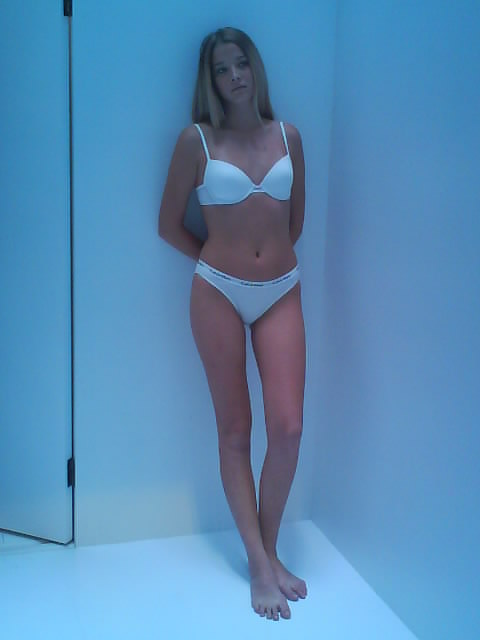
2008

As the swimsuit was evolving, underwear also started to change. Between 1900 and 1940, swimsuit lengths followed the changes in underwear designs. In the 1920s women started discarding the corset, while the Cadole company of Paris started developing something they called the "breast girdle". During the Great Depression, panties and bras became softly constructed and were made of various elasticized yarns making underwear fit like a second skin. By the 1930s underwear styles for both women and men were influenced by the new brief models of swimwear from Europe. Although the waistband was still above the navel, the leg openings of the panty brief were cut in an arc to rise from the crotch to the hip joint. The brief served as a template for most variations of panties for the rest of the century. Warner standardized the concept of Cup size in 1935. The first underwire bra was developed in 1938. Beginning in the late thirties, skants, a type of skanty men's briefs, were introduced, featuring very high-cut leg openings and a lower rise to the waistband. Howard Hughes designed a push-up bra to be worn by Jane Russell in The Outlaw in 1943, although Russell stated in interviews that she never wore the 'contraption'. In 1950 Maidenform introduced the first official bust enhancing bra.

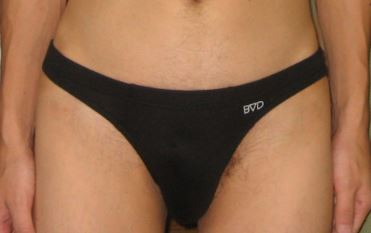
Male bikini briefs.

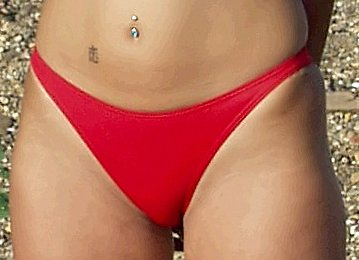
Female bikini briefs.

By the 1960s, the bikini swimsuit influenced panty styles and coincided with the cut of the new lower rise jeans and pants. In the seventies, with the emergence of skintight jeans, thong versions of the panty became mainstream, since the open, stringed back eliminated any tell-tale panty lines across the rear and hips. By the 1980s the design of the French-cut panty pushed the waistband back up to the natural waistline and the rise of the leg openings was nearly as high (French Cut panties come up to the waist, has a high cut leg, and usually are full in the rear). As with the bra and other type of lingerie, manufacturers of the last quarter of the century marketed panty styles that were designed primarily for their sexual allure. From this decade sexualization and eroticization of the male body was on the rise. The male body was celebrated through advertising campaigns for brands such as Calvin Klein, particularly by photographers Bruce Weber and Herb Ritts. Male bodies and men's undergarments were commodified and packaged for mass consumption, and swimwear and sportswear were influenced by sports photography and fitness. Over time, swimwear evolved from weighty wool to high-tech skin-tight garments, eventually cross-breeding with sportswear, underwear and exercise wear, resulting in the interchangeable fashions of the 1990s.

== Bikini waxing ==
Bikini waxing styles (Note: Sources:)

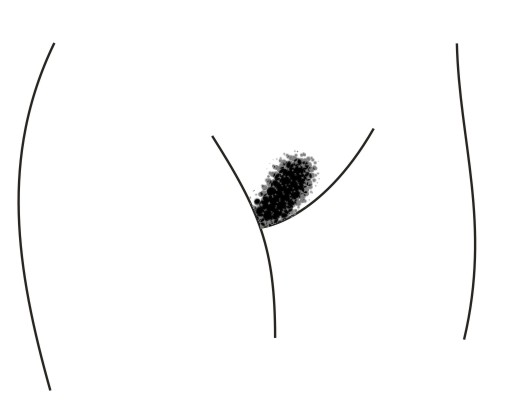
American waxing (also: triangle, regular).

French waxing (also: Mohican, landing strip).

Brazilian waxing (also: Hollywood, full monty).

Bikini waxing is the epilation of pubic hair beyond the bikini line by use of waxing. The bikini line delineates the part of a woman's pubic area to be covered by the bottom part of a bikini, which means any pubic hair visible beyond the boundaries of a swimsuit. Visible pubic hair is widely culturally disapproved, considered to be embarrassing, and often removed.

As popularity of bikinis grew, the acceptability of pubic hair diminished. But, with certain styles of women's swimwear, pubic hair may become visible around the crotch area of a swimsuit. With the reduction in the size of swimsuits, especially since the advent of the bikini after 1945, the practice of bikini waxing has also become popular. The Brazilian style which became popular with the rise of thong bottoms.

Depending on the style of bikini-bottom and the amount of skin visible outside the bikini, pubic hair may be styled into several styles: American waxing (removal of pubic hair from the sides, top of the thighs, and under the navel), French waxing (leaving only a vertical strip in front), or Brazilian waxing (removal of all hair in the pelvic area, particularly suitable for thong bottoms).

== Bikini tan ==
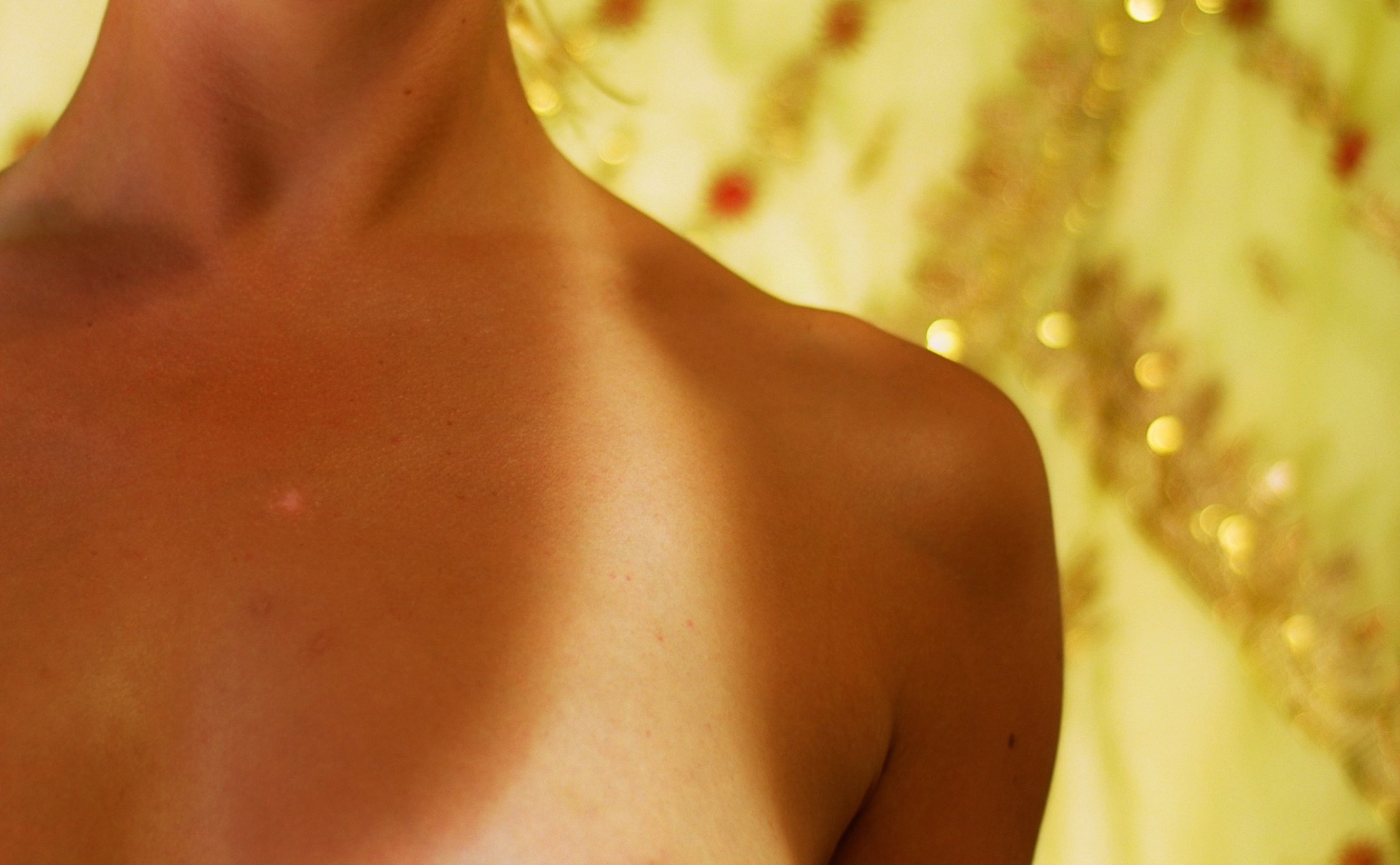
Tan lines created by the wearing of a bikini.

The tan lines created by the wearing of a bikini while tanning are known as a bikini tan. These tan lines separate pale breasts, crotch, and buttocks from otherwise tanned skin. Prominent bikini tan lines were popular in the 1990s, and a spa in Brazil started offering perfect bikini tan lines using masking tapes in 2016.

As bikini-style swimsuits leave most of the body exposed to potentially dangerous UV radiation, overexposure can cause sunburn, skin cancer, as well as other acute and chronic health effects on the skin, eyes, and immune system. As a result, medical organizations recommend that bikini wearers protect themselves from UV radiation by using broad-spectrum sunscreen, which has been shown to protect against sunburn, skin cancer, wrinkling and sagging skin.

A 1969 innovation of tan-through swimwear uses fabric which is perforated with thousands of micro holes that are nearly invisible to the naked eye, but which let enough sunlight through to produce a line-free tan.

== See also ==
- Beauty pageant
- Cultural views on the navel
- Bikini in popular culture
