= Beijing bikini =

Act of rolling up a shirt to expose the stomach

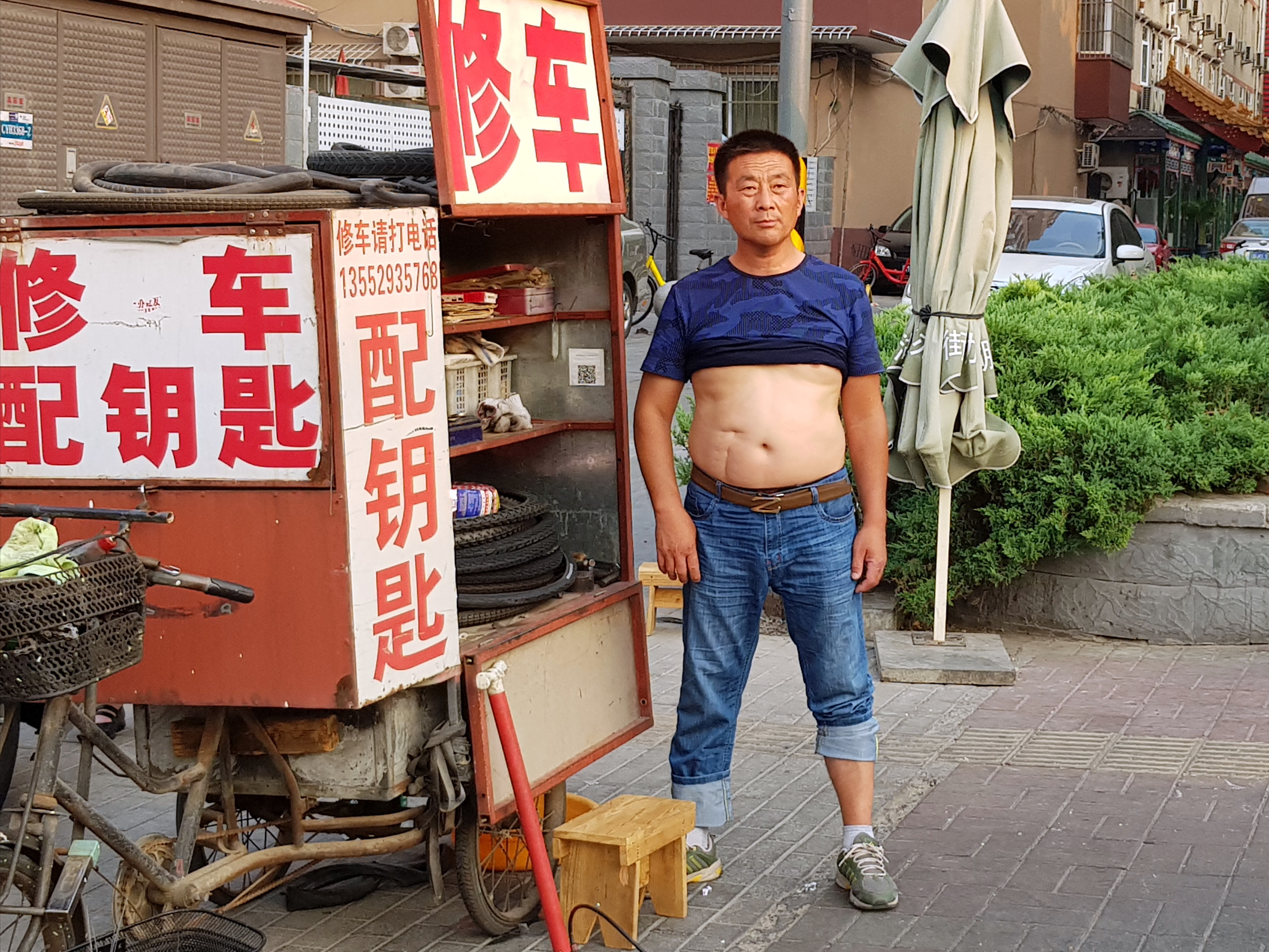
A Chinese man sporting a Beijing bikini in Beijing, 2017

The Beijing bikini is a phenomenon observed in China during hot summer months in which men roll up their shirts and expose their midriff, often with a cigarette in hand. In Mandarin, a derogatory term for it is "bǎngyé" (膀爷), which loosely translates to "exposing oneself like a grandfather".

== Practice ==
The phrase "Beijing bikini" refers to the practice where men in Chinese cities roll up their shirts to expose their midriff during hot summer months, including in parks, street corners, on motorbikes, and at open restaurants. The practice has also gained visibility internationally, with Chinese tourists displaying the Beijing bikini at landmarks such as New York City's art museums, Buckingham Palace in London, and the Eiffel Tower in Paris.

Based on traditional Chinese medicine, the practice of exposing one's midriff is believed to facilitate the circulation of warm "qi" energy around the internal organs. Therefore, men commonly roll up their shirts without hesitation, embracing this cultural belief.

== Public perception ==
While proponents argue its practical benefits in managing hot temperatures, the practice faces criticism from segments of society who deem it uncouth. Social norms discourage women from engaging in similar displays.

In a 2019 interview with Beijing Youth Daily, a spokesperson for Jinan's civility department told the paper that the Beijing bikini affected "the image of the city and the perception and feeling of the public". They also mentioned that the practice had significantly decreased in recent years.

== Bans and regulations ==
Authorities in several Chinese cities have initiated strict measures to curb the practice of public shirtlessness and other forms of casual exposure, citing concerns over public decorum and hygiene.

In July 2019, in response to the popular summer practice, authorities in Jinan, China, issued a notice banning shirtlessness and exposure of body parts in public places. This move aimed to address what officials termed as "uncivilized behavior" damaging the city's image. The authorities specifically called out the city's bikini-toting older men, referred to as bang ye, who they accuse of tarnishing the city's image. The move sparked debate on social media, where some criticized the regulations as excessive. Similar regulations have been implemented in other Chinese cities like Tianjin and Handan.

In April 2020, the city of Beijing mandated that residents must dress appropriately and refrain from going shirtless in public to enhance public hygiene amid the coronavirus pandemic originating in China. The directive specifically targeted the Beijing bikini.
