= 2007 =

2007 in various calendars
- Gregorian calendar: 2007; MMVII
- Ab urbe condita: 2760
- Armenian calendar: 1456; ԹՎ ՌՆԾԶ
- Assyrian calendar: 6757
- Baháʼí calendar: 163–164
- Balinese saka calendar: 1928–1929
- Bengali calendar: 1413–1414
- Berber calendar: 2957
- British Regnal year: 55 Eliz. 2 – 56 Eliz. 2
- Buddhist calendar: 2551
- Burmese calendar: 1369
- Byzantine calendar: 7515–7516
- Chinese calendar: 丙戌年 (Fire Dog); 4704 or 4497 — to — 丁亥年 (Fire Pig); 4705 or 4498
- Coptic calendar: 1723–1724
- Discordian calendar: 3173
- Ethiopian calendar: 1999–2000
- Hebrew calendar: 5767–5768
- Hindu calendars
- Vikram Samvat: 2063–2064
- Shaka Samvat: 1928–1929
- Kali Yuga: 5107–5108
- Holocene calendar: 12007
- Igbo calendar: 1007–1008
- Iranian calendar: 1385–1386
- Islamic calendar: 1427–1428
- Japanese calendar: Heisei 19 (平成１９年)
- Javanese calendar: 1939–1940
- Juche calendar: 96
- Julian calendar: Gregorian minus 13 days
- Korean calendar: 4340
- Minguo calendar: ROC 96 民國96年
- Nanakshahi calendar: 539
- Thai solar calendar: 2550
- Tibetan calendar: མེ་ཕོ་ཁྱི་ལོ་ (male Fire-Dog); 2133 or 1752 or 980 — to — མེ་མོ་ཕག་ལོ་ (female Fire-Boar); 2134 or 1753 or 981
- Unix time: 1167609600 – 1199145599

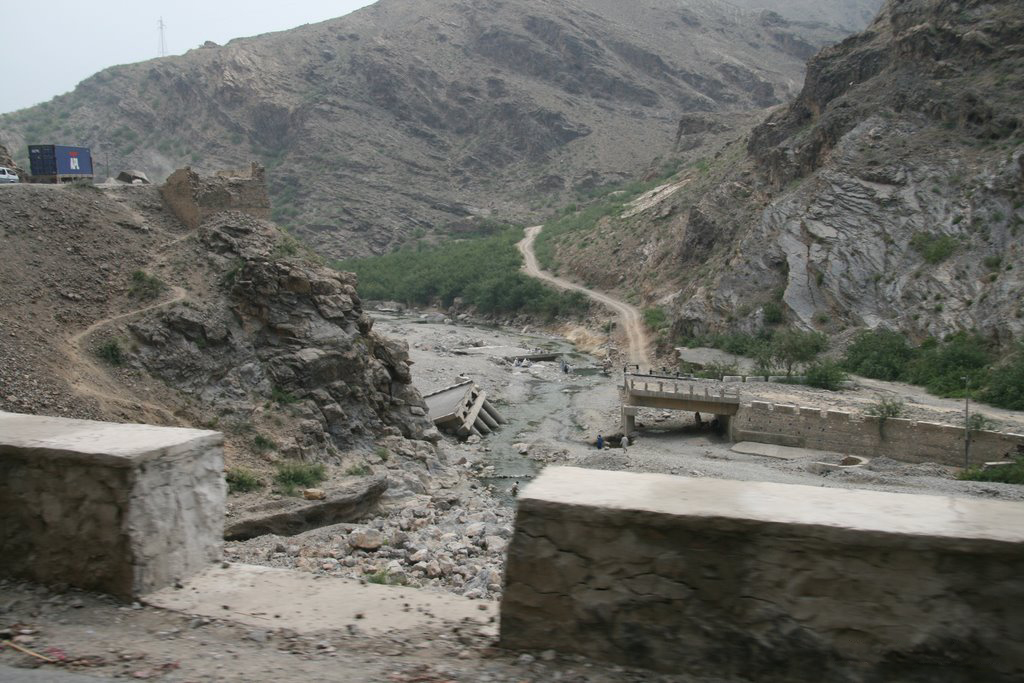
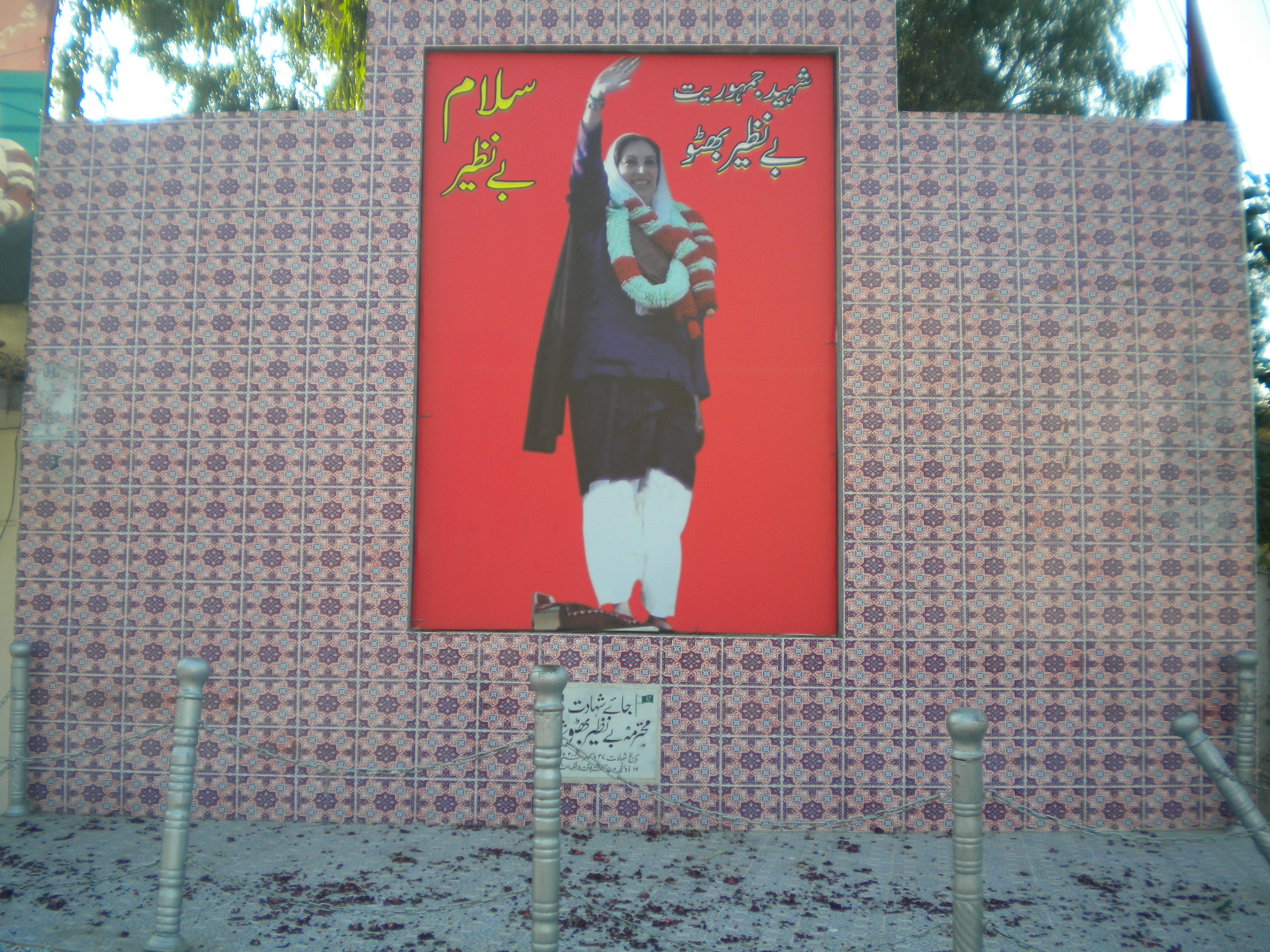
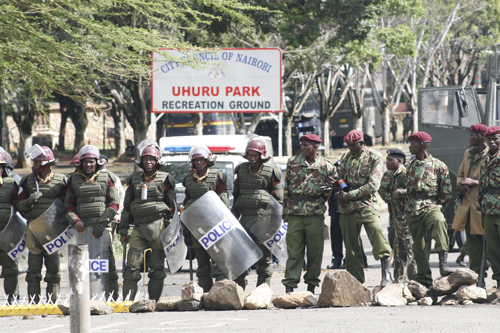
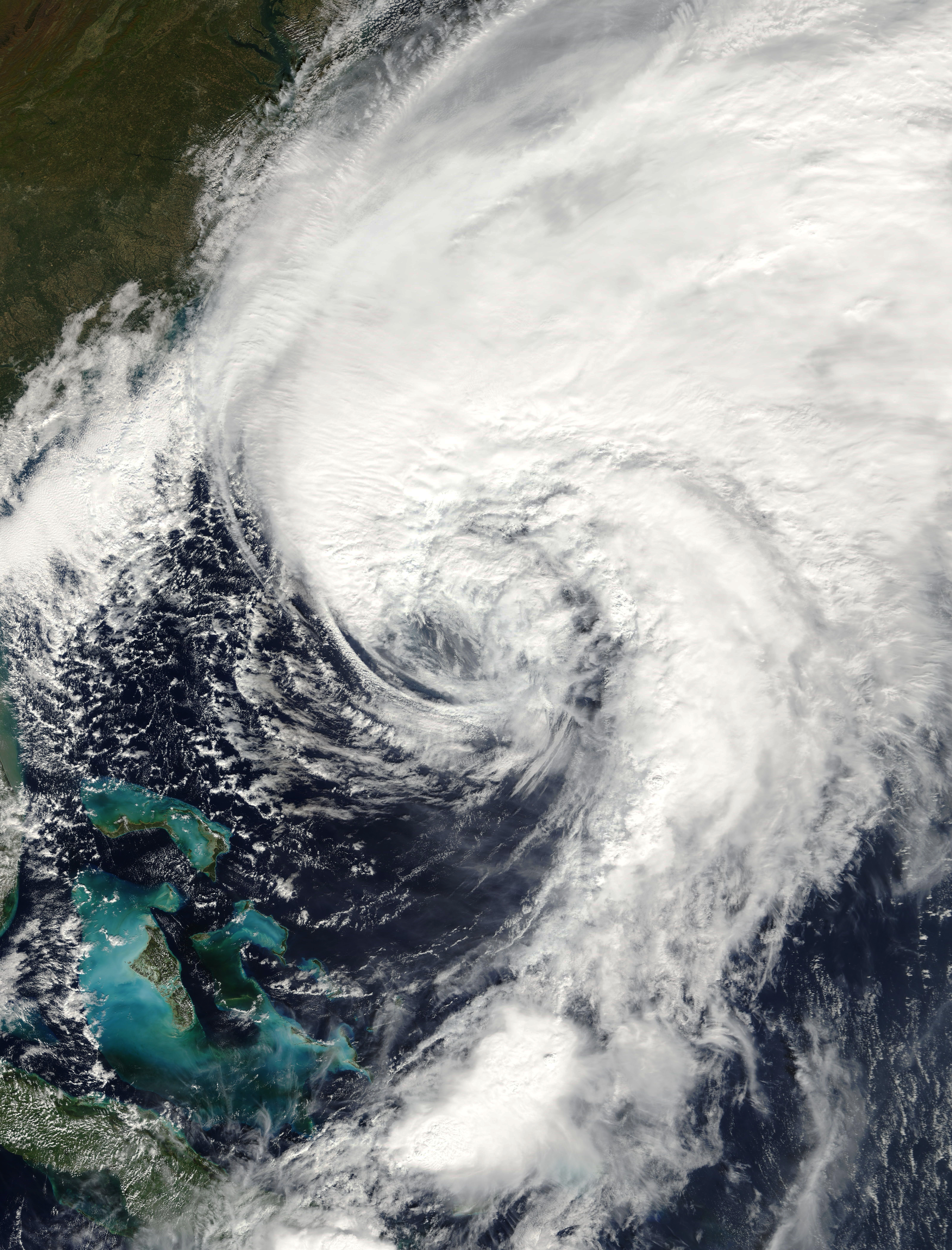
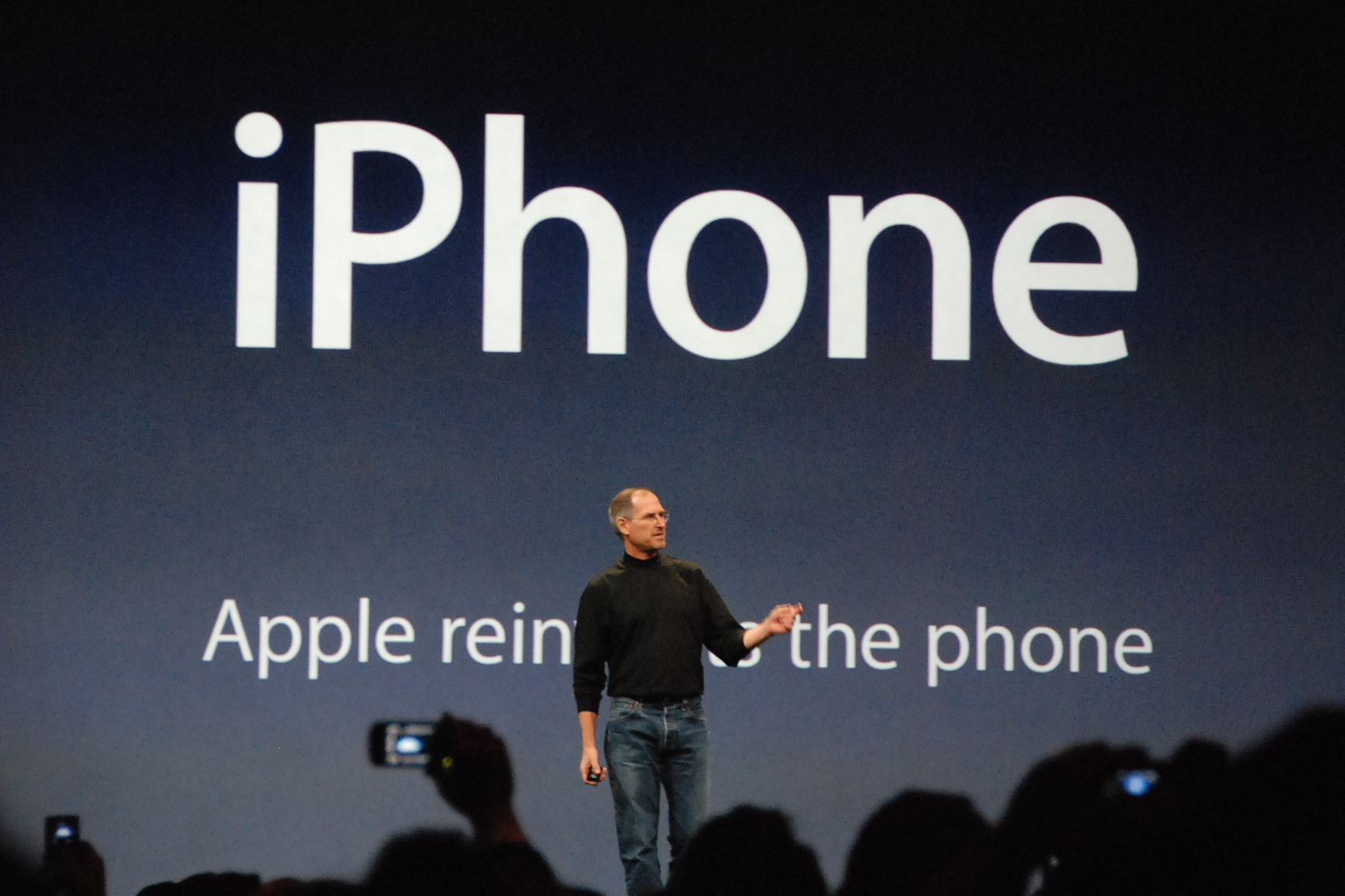
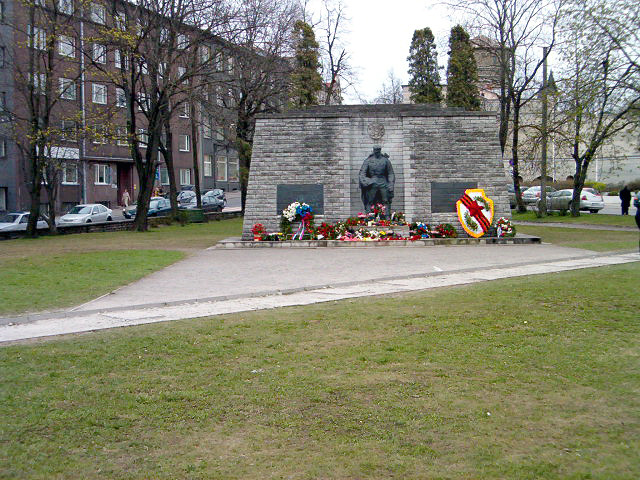
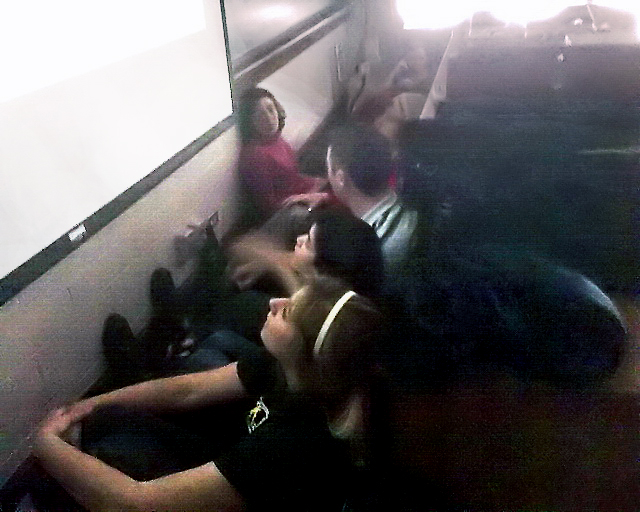
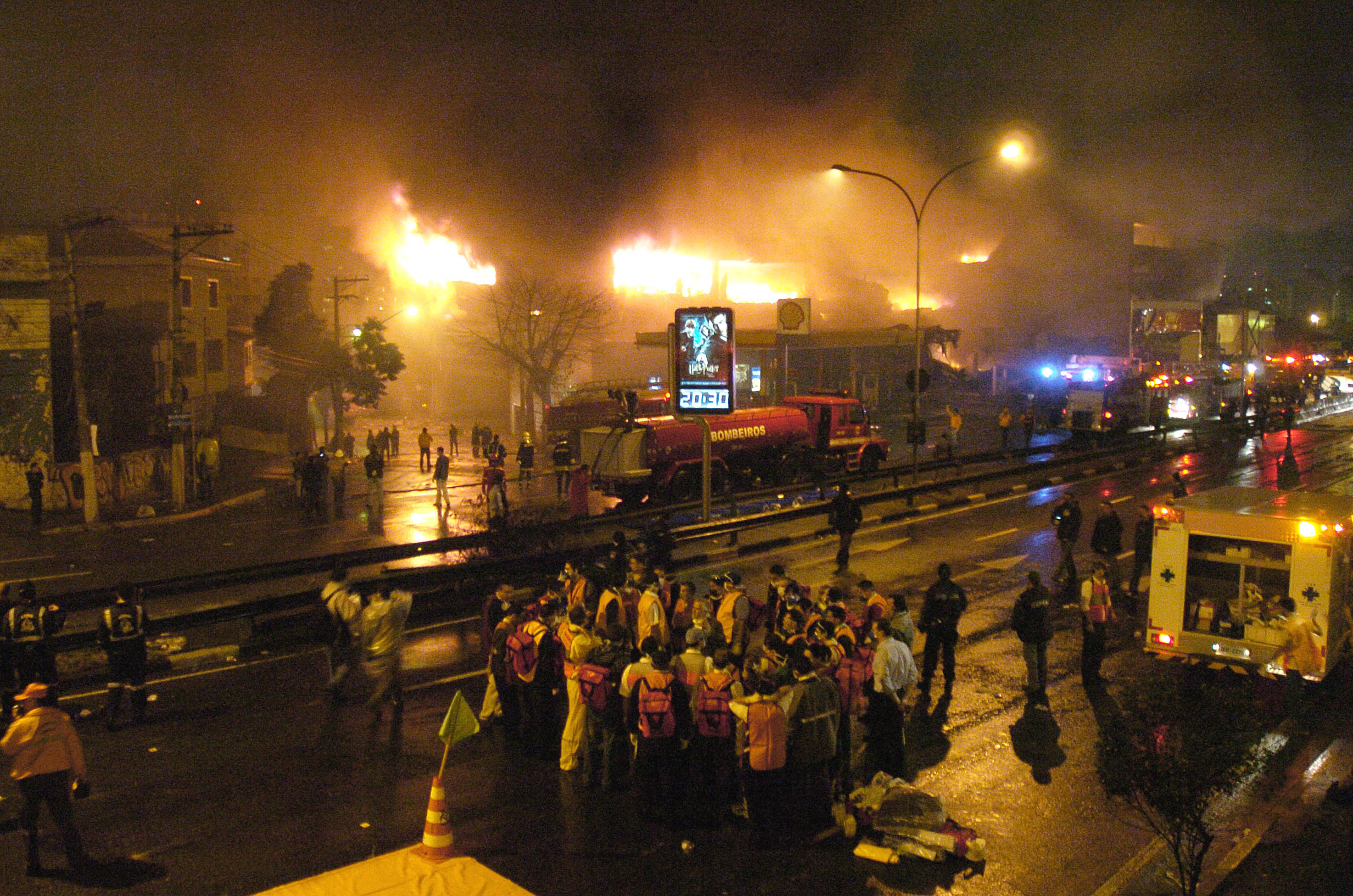
From left to right, top to bottom:
- Aftermath of a collapsed bridge in Pakistan caused by the 2007 South Asian floods;
- Benazir Bhutto, former prime minister of Pakistan was assassinated;
- The 2007–2008 Kenyan crisis was a violent political, economic, and humanitarian crisis in Kenya;
- Hurricane Noel killed 223 and carved a path of destruction across the Atlantic Ocean.
- The original iPhone is launched by Apple, marking a new era in cellphones and changing how people use them today;
- The previous monument location of the Bronze Soldier of Tallinn–a Soviet-era war memorial–was dismantled, sparking the Bronze Night movement;
- A car of Google Street View, launched that year;
- Seung-Hui Cho shoots and kills 32 at Virginia Tech before killing himself;
- TAM Airlines Flight 3054 crashed at Congonhas-São Paulo Airport after overrunning the runway, killing 199.

2007 (MMVII) was a common year starting on Monday of the Gregorian calendar, the 2007th year of the Common Era (CE) and Anno Domini (AD) designations, the 7th year of the 3rd millennium and the 21st century, and the 8th year of the 2000s decade.

2007 was designated as the International Heliophysical Year and the International Polar Year.

== Population ==
The world population on January 1, 2007, was estimated to be 6.714 billion people and increased to 6.801 billion people by January 1, 2008. An estimated 139.9 million births and 53.4 million deaths took place in 2007. The average global life expectancy was 69.0 years, an increase of 0.4 years from 2006. The estimated number of global refugees increased from 9.9 million to 11.4 million by the end of the year. The largest sources of refugees were Afghanistan with 3.1 million people and Iraq with 2.3 million people.

== Conflicts ==
There were 34 conflicts in 2007 that resulted in at least 25 fatalities. Four of these resulted in at least 1,000 fatalities: the Iraqi insurgency, the Taliban insurgency in Afghanistan, Eelam War IV in Sri Lanka, and the War in Somalia. This was the first year since 1957 to have fewer than five such conflicts. Conflicts in 2007 trended toward fragmentation as insurgencies, criminal organizations, and terrorist groups engaged with each other.

The Iraqi insurgency against the Multi-National Force – Iraq grew in 2007. Conflict rose between Sunni and Shia populations, and sectarian militias emerged. Despite making up a small portion of the insurgency, al-Qaeda in Iraq became a major perpetrator of mass-casualty attacks. The United States escalated its presence in Iraq with a surge of soldiers and the commencement of Operation Phantom Thunder to combat Al-Qaeda and other Islamist groups. American soldiers launched a new attack on the Diyala Governorate as part of the Diyala campaign.

Israel and Palestine made progress toward peace during the Annapolis Conference, but Hamas defeated soldiers from the Palestinian Authority in a battle for the Gaza Strip and seized the territory.

The Central African Bush War ended when rebels with the Union of Democratic Forces for Unity were granted amnesty, and the First Ivorian Civil War ended with the Ouagadougou Agreement that authorized the merger of the government and the Patriotic Movement of Ivory Coast rebel group. Progress was made in the Juba talks that moved Uganda closer to peace with the Lord's Resistance Army, but a permanent ceasefire was not obtained. A peace agreement was reached with the Union of Forces for Democracy and Development rebellion in Chad, but the rebels broke the agreement a month later. The War in Darfur slowed slightly early in the year but then revived with a stronger inclination toward fragmentation and insurgent-style fighting over traditional warfare, including rebel groups that launched attacks out of neighboring Chad.

Several conflicts emerged or resumed in 2007 as rebel groups and insurgencies became active. The ADC rebel group started an insurgency in northern Mali, reviving a 1990s insurgency for Tuareg separatism. Another Tuareg insurgency formed in Niger, the Niger Movement for Justice, but it did not promote the separatist beliefs of the ADC. Rebellion by Tehreek-e-Nafaz-e-Shariat-e-Mohammadi resumed in Pakistan, escalating after a siege on a mosque in July. Other conflicts that resumed in 2007 included the Cabinda War in Angola and the conflict with the Shining Path in Peru. Bundu dia Kongo, a Kongo separatist movement in the Democratic Republic of the Congo, abandoned its mostly-peaceful approach and formally militarized.

== Culture ==
The highest-grossing film globally in 2007 was Pirates of the Caribbean: At World's End, followed by Harry Potter and the Order of the Phoenix and Spider-Man 3. Western films made a slight resurgence in 2007 with the releases of No Country for Old Men, 3:10 to Yuma, and The Assassination of Jesse James by the Coward Robert Ford. The film 300 by then-unknown director Zack Snyder was one of the biggest films of the year.

The best-selling album globally in 2007 was the High School Musical 2 soundtrack, followed by Back to Black by Amy Winehouse and Noël by Josh Groban. Harry Potter and the Deathly Hallows, the final entry of the Harry Potter series of novels, became the best-selling novel of the year. Duncan Sheik premiered a musical adaptation of the 1891 German play Spring Awakening. The Wii console, released by Nintendo in 2006, was the predominant video game system in 2007. The most popular video games that came out in 2007 include Halo 3, Mass Effect, Bioshock, Call of Duty 4: Modern Warfare, Team Fortress 2, and Super Mario Galaxy.

== Economy ==
The gross world product increased by 3.7% in 2007, slowing after the 3.9% growth in 2006. Growth was highest in transition economies at 8.0% and developing countries at 6.9%. Inflation slowed in developed countries to an increase of only 1.9%, while developing countries saw an inflation rate of 5.6%. Unemployment rates lowered throughout the world, albeit less so in Africa.

Negotiations surrounding the Doha Development Round resumed in February, but no progress was made throughout the year. Oil prices rose as demand from developing countries exceeded the resource slack, and development of biofuel contributing to rising prices for wheat and maize.

Rupert Murdoch purchased Dow Jones & Company, which included its publication The Wall Street Journal, for $5 billion.

The subprime mortgage crisis occurred in the United States in late 2007 as housing prices plummeted, leading to global economic downturn.

== Environment and weather ==
The year 2007 was the fifth hottest year on record. January was warmed by El Niño and the final months of the year were cooled by La Niña. Heat waves occurred in Europe during May through July and in North America during August. A severe cold wave took place in the United States in April. An ongoing drought in Australia grew worse in the Murray–Darling basin. Rains and flooding caused significant displacement or crop damage in places including Bolivia, Costa Rica, Mexico, Nicaragua, Thailand, and Uruguay. Approximately 500 people were killed by a magnitude 8 earthquake in Peru. The Arctic ice pack melted at ten times the annual average, and during summer the Northwest Passage was entirely clear of ice for the first time.

Fifteen tropical storms occurred in the 2007 Atlantic hurricane season, including six hurricanes: Hurricane Dean, Hurricane Felix, Hurricane Humberto, Hurricane Karen, and Hurricane Noel. Although the number of tropical storms was higher than average, eight of them lasted under two days and the season overall was of average intensity. Landfall of Hurricane Dean and Hurricane Felix in Central America marked the first time on record for two category five hurricanes to make landfall in one season. Twenty-five tropical storms occurred in the 2007 Pacific typhoon season, including fifteen typhoons. The most intense typhoons were Typhoon Sepat, Typhoon Man-yi, Typhoon Wipha, and Typhoon Krosa. Taiwan experienced significant damage from Typhoon Krosa and Typhoon Sepat. Typhoon Wipha caused two million people to be temporarily displaced around Fuding, China, while Tropical Storm Lekima destroyed 100,000 homes in Vietnam

== Health ==
An outbreak of Rift Valley fever continued in eastern Africa after breaking out at the end of 2006.

== Politics and law ==
The war in Iraq remained central in global politics as American actions were scrutinized, including the use of private military companies and the killing of 17 Iraqi civilians. Palestine split into two governments as Hamas controlled the Gaza Strip while Fatah retained control of the West Bank. Although Iran was understood to have halted its nuclear weapons program in 2003, the United States declared the country a nuclear threat. Protests broke out in Iran after the government announced it would be rationing fuel.

Nicolas Sarkozy became president of France and worked toward several reforms, including a push to increase the 35 hour workweek. Gordon Brown became prime minister of the United Kingdom with a promise of political continuity. Turkey elected Abdullah Gül as president and reelected Recep Tayyip Erdoğan as prime minister.

Civil unrest in Bangladesh grew worse as the military attacked a Buddhist pro-democracy demonstration. The United Russia party of President Vladimir Putin retained power in the Russian legislative election, and Putin announced his intention to have First Deputy Prime Minister Dmitry Medvedev succeed him the following year. In Venezuela, a constitutional referendum that would have let President Hugo Chávez exceed his term limits was unsuccessful.

President Pervez Musharraf of Pakistan gave up his military position to but then brought about a period of emergency rule. He declared this was to prevent Islamist attacks, but critics alleged he was attempting to maintain power. Former prime minister of Pakistan Benazir Bhutto was assassinated in an attack at the end of the year, in the days leading up to the 2008 election that may have seen her return to the office.

The Disappearance of Madeleine McCann was a story of international interest after a young girl from the United Kingdom disappeared while on vacation in Portugal.

== Religion ==
The Anglican Communion remained split over the issue of gay bishops, specifically Gene Robinson of the United States, with Archbishop Peter Akinola of the Church of Nigeria leading the charge to promote conservatism within Anglicanism.

Fashion designer Aheda Zanetti invented the burqini as swimwear that met Islamic clothing requirements.

== Science ==
The dinosaur Gigantoraptor erlianensis was described, with its size suggesting that dinosaurs did not necessarily get smaller as they evolved into birds.

The iPhone became a phenomenon when it was announced and lines formed around Apple Stores upon its release.

== Events ==
=== January ===
Bulgaria and Romania (both in yellow) join the European Union

- January 1
  - Bulgaria and Romania join the European Union, while Slovenia joins the Eurozone.
  - Adam Air Flight 574, en route to Manado, Indonesia, from Surabaya, Indonesia, crashes into the Makassar Strait; killing all 102 on board.
- January 8 – Russian oil supplies to Poland, Germany, and Ukraine are cut as the Russia–Belarus energy dispute escalates; they are restored three days later.
- January 9 – Apple CEO Steve Jobs introduces the original iPhone at a Macworld keynote in San Francisco, California; starting the new era of smartphones with this invention. The phone would be released in June.
- January 10 – Iraq War: The surge of US troops in Iraq is announced.
- January 30 – Windows Vista is released to consumers by Microsoft.
- January 31 – Boston, Massachusetts, United States faces a hoax bomb scare, as a result of LED placards of Ignignokt and Err from Aqua Teen Hunger Force being mistaken as an improvised explosive device.

=== February ===
- February 2 – The IPCC publishes its fourth assessment report, having concluded that global climate change is "very likely" to have a predominantly human cause.
- February 3 – A truck bomb explodes in Baghdad, Iraq, killing at least 135 people and injures 339 others.
- February 13 – North Korea agrees to shut down its nuclear facilities in Yongbyon by April 14 as a first step towards complete denuclearization, receiving in return energy aid equivalent to 50,000 tons of heavy fuel oil.
- February 19 – Microblogging social network Tumblr is launched to the public.
- February 26 – The International Court of Justice finds Serbia guilty of failing to prevent genocide in the Srebrenica massacre, but clears it of direct responsibility and complicity in the case.

=== March ===
- March 1 – The fourth International Polar Year, a $1.73 billion research program to study both the North Pole and South Pole, is launched in Paris.
- March 3 – A total lunar eclipse occurs and is visible in the Americas, Europe, Africa and Asia. It is the 52nd lunar eclipse of Lunar Saros series 123 occurring at the moon's descending node. The moon is just 3.2 days before apogee, making it fairly small.
- March 4 – The First Ivorian Civil War ends with a peace agreement.
- March 11 – Georgia accuses three Russian helicopters of firing on the Kodori Gorge, then the only part of the break-away autonomous republic of Abkhazia still under Georgian control.
- March 13–April 28 – The 2007 Cricket World Cup is held in the West Indies with Australia defeating Sri Lanka in the final.
- March 19 – The first solar eclipse of the year 2007 is a partial solar eclipse occurring just 0.7 days before perigee, making it very large. The Moon covers 87.558% of the Sun. In this partial solar eclipse, the best visibility occurs at 61º02'55" N, 55º28'04" E. It is the 20th solar eclipse of Solar Saros series 149, at ascending node. The Sun is its zenith just 83 km south of the Equator, so the Northern Hemisphere was in winter and the Southern Hemisphere was in summer on March 19, 2007.
- March 23 – Naval forces of Islamic Revolutionary Guard Corps arrest Royal Navy personnel in disputed Iran-Iraq waters; they were released on April 4.
- March 27 – Latvian Prime Minister Aigars Kalvītis and Russian Prime Minister Mikhail Fradkov sign a border treaty between Latvia and Russia, officially demarcating the border between the two.

=== April ===
- April 16 – Virginia tech massacre: 23-year-old Seung-Hui Cho fatally shoots 32 people and injured 17 others, before committing suicide as police arrive on the scene.
- April 18 – 18 April 2007 Baghdad bombings: A series of attacks take place across Baghdad, Iraq, killing nearly 200 people.
- April 24 – Gliese 581c, a potentially Earth-like extrasolar planet habitable for life, is discovered in the constellation Libra.
- April 26–27 – "Bronze Night": Ethnic Russian riot in Tallinn and other cities in Estonia against the moving of the Bronze Soldier of Tallinn, a Soviet World War II memorial statue. 2007 cyberattacks on Estonia begin.

=== May ===
- May 3 – British three-year-old Madeleine McCann disappears in Praia da Luz, Lagos, Portugal, described by The Daily Telegraph as "the most heavily reported missing-person case in modern history".
- May 4 – The 2007 Greensburg tornado moves through Kiowa County, Kansas, United States, striking the town of Greensburg and killing eleven residents. 95% of the town was destroyed, and the tornado was the first to be rated EF5 on the Enhanced Fujita scale.
- May 5 – Kenya Airways Flight 507, on a scheduled passenger flight from Doula, Cameroon, to Nairobi, Kenya, crashes after takeoff, killing all 114 crew and passengers on board.
- May 6 – 2007 French presidential election: Nicolas Sarkozy is elected President of France in the second round.
- May 10 – As a result of factors including the Blair–Brown deal and falling approval ratings as a result of the Iraq War, British Prime Minister Tony Blair announces his intention to resign as Leader of the Labour Party and Prime Minister, triggering the 2007 Labour Party leadership election, in which Chancellor Gordon Brown ran unopposed. Brown would officially replace Blair as Prime Minister on 27 June.
- May 10–12 – The Eurovision Song Contest 2007 takes place in Helsinki, Finland, and is won by Serbian entrant Marija Šerifović with the song "Molitva".
- May 11 – Malietoa Tanumafili II, the head of state of Samoa since its independence, dies in office at the age of 94. His death triggers the first election for the office of Samoan head of state.
- May 17 – The Russian Orthodox Church Abroad and the Moscow Patriarchate re-unite after 80 years of schism.
- May 20 – Sheikh Mohammed bin Rashid Al Maktoum of Dubai makes the largest single charitable donation in modern history, committing €7.41 billion to an educational foundation in the Middle East.

=== June ===
- June 5 – NASA's MESSENGER spacecraft makes its second fly-by of Venus on route to Mercury.
- June 10–15 – Fatah-Hamas conflict: The Battle of Gaza is fought between Fatah and Hamas, and ends with Hamas gaining control of the Gaza Strip.
- June 15 – Bob Barker hosts his final episode of The Price Is Right after 35 years of hosting.
- June 22 – The 2007 Ellie tornado becomes the only F5 tornado recorded under the use of the Fujita scale in Canada, reaching windspeeds up to 320 mph (510 km/h).
- June 22–June 24 – Canadian professional wrestler Chris Benoit commits a double-murder suicide on his wife and youngest son at their home in Fayetteville, Georgia, United States.
- June 24 – American rapper T.I was involved in a physical altercation with Chaka Zulu, the manager of Ludacris, at the Sunset Tower Hotel in West Hollywood, California.
- June 27 – Gordon Brown succeeds Tony Blair and becomes Prime Minister of the United Kingdom after a leadership election.
- June 28 – 2007 European heat wave: in the aftermath of Greece's worst heat wave in a century, at least 11 people are reported dead from heatstroke, approximately 200 wildfires break out nationwide, and the country's electricity grid nearly collapses due to record breaking demand.
- June 29 – The iPhone, the first modern smartphone, is released in the United States. It is later released in the United Kingdom, Ireland, France, Germany, and Austria, in November 2007.

=== July ===
- July 4 – The International Olympic Committee awards Sochi the right to host the 2014 Winter Olympics.
- July 7 – Live Earth Concerts are held in nine major cities around the world to raise environmental awareness.
- July 17
  - TAM Airlines Flight 3054 an Airbus A320-233 overruns the runway of São Paulo–Congonhas Airport runway 35L, flies over Avenida Washington Luís and crashes into TAM Express building and a Shell filling station adjacent to the TAM Express building. All 187 passengers and crew are killed instantly. 12 people inside the TAM Express and the Shell filling station are also killed.
  - The dwarf planet Gonggong is discovered by astronomers Megan Schwamb, Michael Brown, and David Rabinowitz from the Palomar Observatory.
- July 24 – Five Bulgarian nurses are released from Libyan prison after eight and a half years spent behind bars in Benghazi and Tripoli, marking the end of the so-called "HIV trial in Libya".
- July 31 – Operation Banner comes to an end, thus ending the longest continuous deployment in British military history.

=== August ===
- August 4 – The Phoenix spacecraft is launched toward Mars to study its north pole.
- August 9 – Subprime mortgage crisis: The French global bank BNP Paribas in the United Kingdom blocks withdrawals from three hedge funds heavily committed in subprime lendings, signaling the 2008 financial crisis.
- August 10 – The UEFA Executive Committee decided to cancel the UEFA Euro 2008 qualifying matches between Armenia and Azerbaijan in Group A, after the proposal to play them on neutral ground was rejected by the federations of the two countries.
- August 14 – Multiple suicide bombings kill 572 people in Qahtaniya, northern Iraq.
- August 15 – An 8.0 earthquake strikes Peru, killing at least 519 people, injuring more than 1,300, and causing tsunami warnings in the Pacific Ocean.
- August 15 – Anti-government protests in Myanmar suppressed by ruling junta.

=== September ===
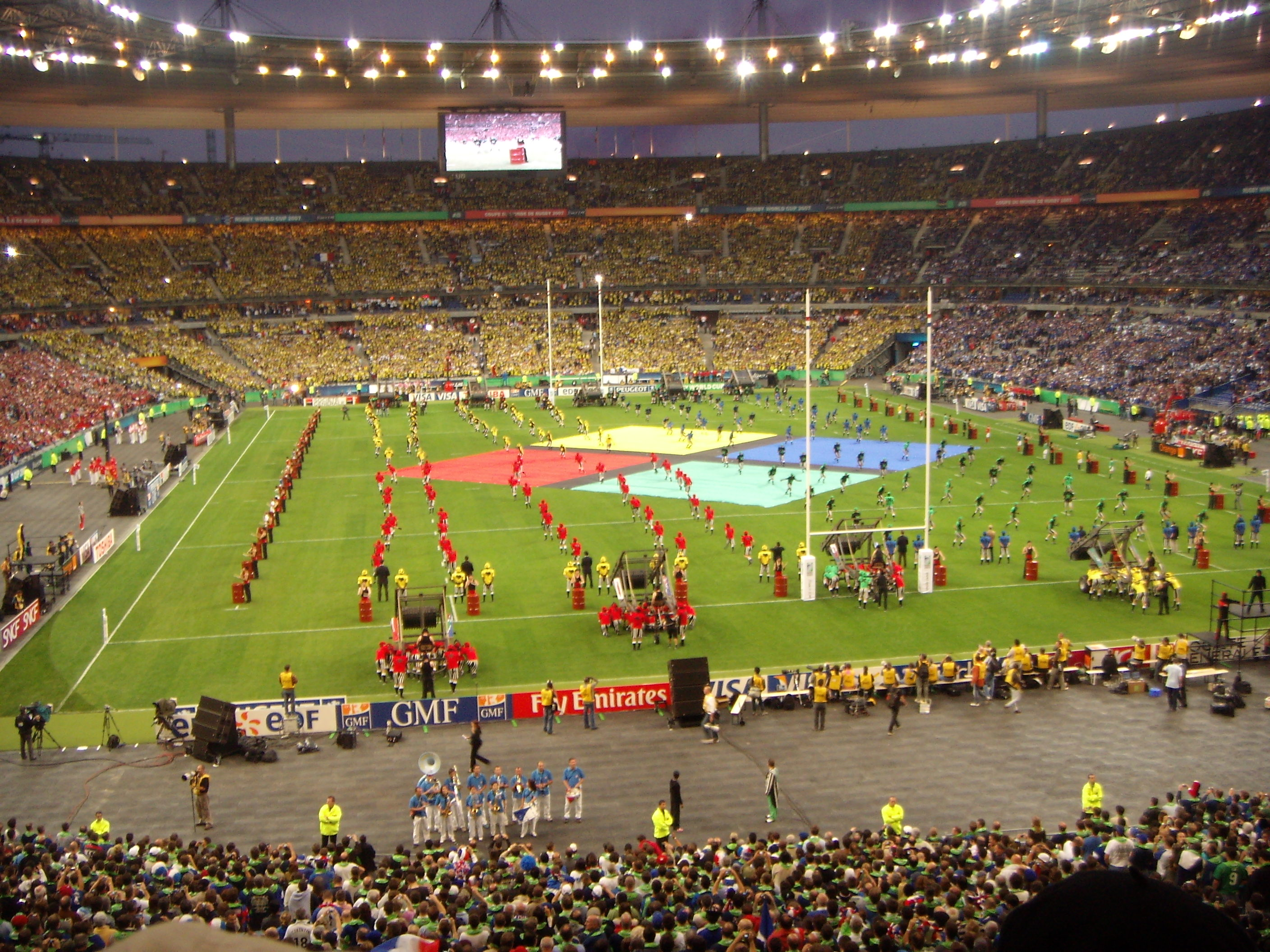
The opening ceremony of the 2007 Rugby World Cup

- September 6 – Israeli Air Force airplanes attack a suspected nuclear reactor in Syria in an airstrike.
- September 7 – October 20 – The 2007 Rugby World Cup takes place in France. South Africa beat defending champions England in the final.
- September 11 – Ethiopia celebrates the third millennium in Ethiopian calendar.
- September 12 - Daniel Ciobotea is elected as the 6th Patriarch of the Romanian Orthodox Church since the Church was elevated to this status in 1925.
- September 13 – The United Nations General Assembly adopts the Declaration on the Rights of Indigenous Peoples.
- September 14 – The SELENE spacecraft launches, with its objective being to study the Moon.
- September 20 – The Universal Forum of Cultures opens in Monterrey, Mexico.
- September 25 – Mount Ruapehu in Tongariro National Park in New Zealand, erupts.

=== October ===
- October 10 – Valve Software releases The Orange Box on Windows and Xbox 360.
- October 15 – October 21 – The 17th National Congress of the Chinese Communist Party is held in Beijing, China.
- October 21 – Finnish racing driver Kimi Räikkönen won his first Formula One World Championship, driving for Scuderia Ferrari at the Brazilian Grand Prix.
- October 22 – Montenegro adopts a new constitution, which among other things changes the country's official name from "Republic of Montenegro" to "Montenegro".
- October 28 – 2007 Argentine general election: Cristina Fernández de Kirchner becomes the first directly elected female President of Argentina.
- Sports TV Uganda Limited is incorporated in Uganda.

=== November ===
- November 7
  - Whistleblower website WikiLeaks leaks the standard US army protocol at Guantanamo Bay.
  - The Jokela school shooting happened in Finland.
- November 16 – Up to 15,000 people are believed to have been killed after Cyclone Sidr hits Bangladesh.
- November 24 – 2007 Australian federal election: The Labor Party led by Kevin Rudd defeats the Liberal/National Coalition government led by Prime Minister John Howard. Rudd would be sworn in on December 3.
- November 29 – The Armed Forces of the Philippines lay siege to the Peninsula Manila after soldiers led by Senator Antonio Trillanes stage a mutiny.

=== December ===
- December 1 – At the age of 81 years, 244 days, Queen Elizabeth II becomes the oldest ever reigning British monarch, surpassing Queen Victoria who was aged 81 years, 243 days upon her death on January 22, 1901.
- December 13 – The Treaty of Lisbon is signed by members states of European Union.
- December 20 – The Pablo Picasso painting Portrait of Suzanne Bloch, together with Candido Portinari's O Lavrador de Café, is stolen from the São Paulo Museum of Art.
- December 21 – The Czech Republic, Estonia, Hungary, Latvia, Lithuania, Malta, Poland, Slovakia, and Slovenia join the Schengen border-free zone.
- December 27
  - Former Pakistani prime minister Benazir Bhutto is assassinated, along with 20 other people, at an election rally in Rawalpindi.
  - Riots erupt in Mombasa, Kenya, after Mwai Kibaki is declared the winner of the general election, triggering a political, economic, and humanitarian crisis that killed over 1,000 people.

=== Unknown date ===
- Mauritania is the last country to criminalise slavery (officially abolished in 1981), making the practice illegal everywhere in the world.

== Nobel Prizes ==

- Chemistry – Gerhard Ertl
- Economics – Leonid Hurwicz, Eric Maskin, and Roger Myerson
- Literature – Doris Lessing
- Peace – Al Gore and the United Nations Intergovernmental Panel on Climate Change
- Physics – Albert Fert, Peter Grünberg
- Physiology or Medicine – Mario Capecchi, Oliver Smithies, and Sir Martin Evans

== Bibliography ==
- Brennan, Michael J.; Knabb, Richard D.; Mainelli, Michelle; Kimberlain, Todd B. (December 1, 2009). "Atlantic Hurricane Season of 2007". Monthly Weather Review. 137 (12): 4061–4088. Bibcode:2009MWRv..137.4061B. doi:10.1175/2009MWR2995.1. ISSN 1520-0493.
- Harbom, Lotta; Melander, Erik; Wallensteen, Peter (2008). "Dyadic Dimensions of Armed Conflict, 1946-2007". Journal of Peace Research. 45 (5): 697–710. doi:10.1177/0022343308094331. ISSN 0022-3433. JSTOR 27640741.
- Lea, Adam; Saunders, Mark (January 9, 2008). Summary of 2007 NW Pacific Typhoon Season and Verification of Authors' Seasonal Forecasts (PDF). Tropical Storm Risk (Report). University College London. Archived (PDF) from the original on June 15, 2025.
- Annual 2007 Global Climate Report (Report). National Oceanic and Atmospheric Administration. 2008. Archived from the original on February 1, 2025.
- Stepanova, Ekaterina (2008). "Major armed conflicts". SIPRI Yearbook 2008: Armaments, Disarmament and International Security. Stockholm International Peace Research Institute. pp. 43–71. ISBN 978-0-19-954895-8.
- Time Annual 2008. Time. 2008. ISBN 978-1-933821-22-1.
- World Population Prospects 2024 (Report). United Nations Department of Economic and Social Affairs. 2024. Archived from the original on October 27, 2025.
- World Economic Situation and Prospects 2008 (PDF) (Report). United Nations Department of Economic and Social Affairs. 2008. ISBN 9789211560480.
- 2007 Global Trends (Report). United Nations High Commissioner for Refugees. 2008.
- "Global Conflicts, Economy, Environmental Issues Top News of 2007". Voice of America. December 14, 2007. Archived from the original on February 2, 2025.
