= 2007 heat wave =

2007 heat wave may refer to:

- 2007 Asian heat wave
- 2007 European heat wave
- 2007 Eastern North American heat wave

== See also ==
- Summer 2007
