= Facekini =

Mask designed for swimmers and beachgoers

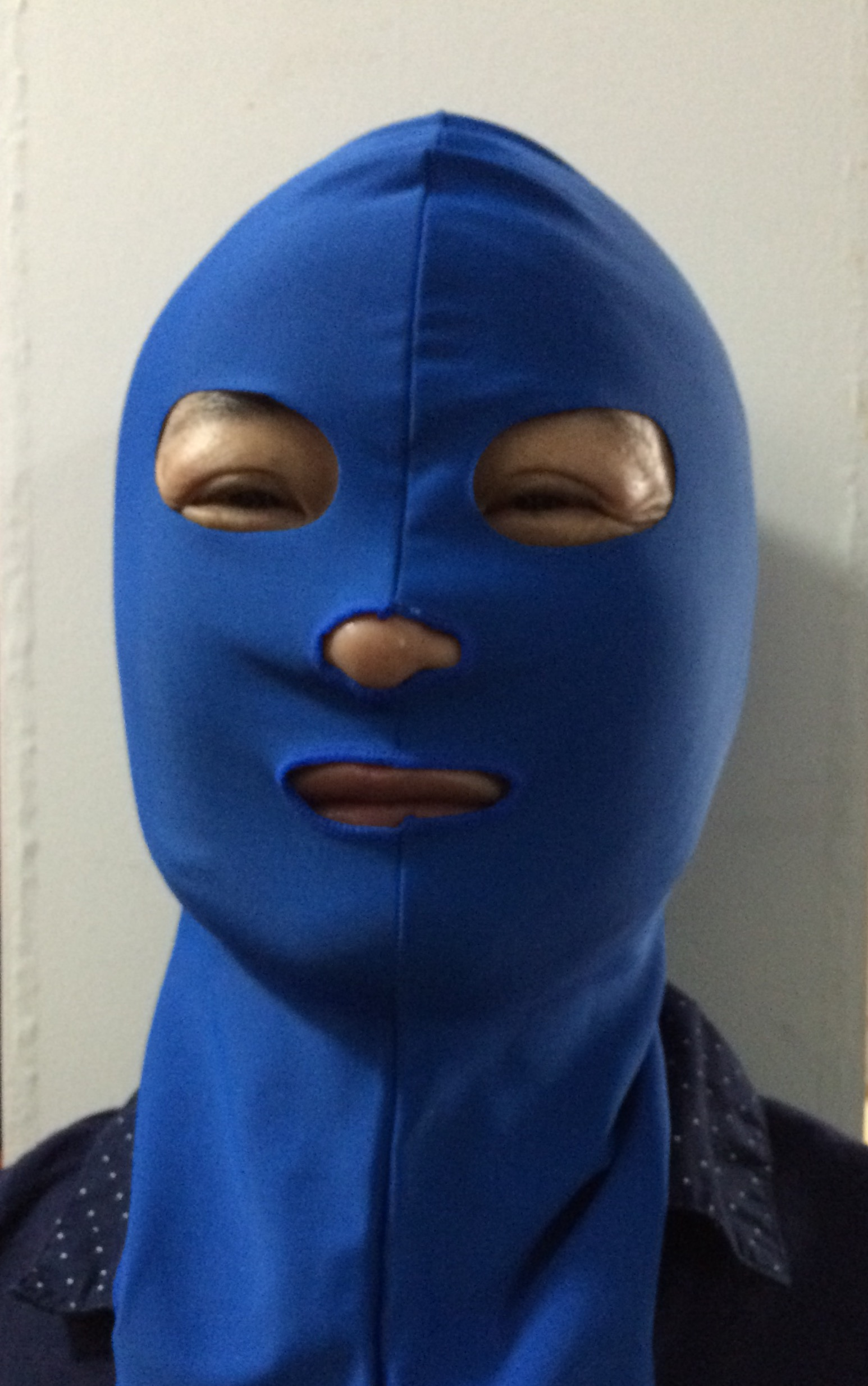
A woman wearing a facekini

The facekini (Chinese: 脸基尼; pinyin: liǎnjīní) is a mask designed for swimmers and beachgoers that covers the head and face, revealing only the eyes, nose, and mouth. The mask is made of stretchy fabric commonly used in bathing suits, and comes in different colors and patterns. They are often worn in combination with various sun protective clothing, such as body suits with long sleeves, sunglasses, visors, or umbrellas.

== Origins ==
The facekini was invented in 2004 by Zhang Shifan, a former accountant from the coastal Chinese city of Qingdao, which became the hometown of this fashion trend. The people of Qingdao use the garment to protect against ultraviolet rays, as well as jellyfish, insects, and other irritants at the beach.

== Fashion trend ==
The facekini garnered increased attention from Western press in 2012, when creator Zhang Shifan began developing high-fashion masks. Fashion magazine CR Fashion Book published several sets of photos in 2014 with models wearing facekinis paired with designer Alexander Wang and Michael Kors swimwear and jewelry. In 2019, its creator launched new models that cover the whole body, not just the face and neck.

== See also ==
- Anti-flash gear
- Balaclava (clothing)
- Burkini
- Visard
- Zentai
