= Balaclava (clothing) =

Woollen cap covering the head and neck

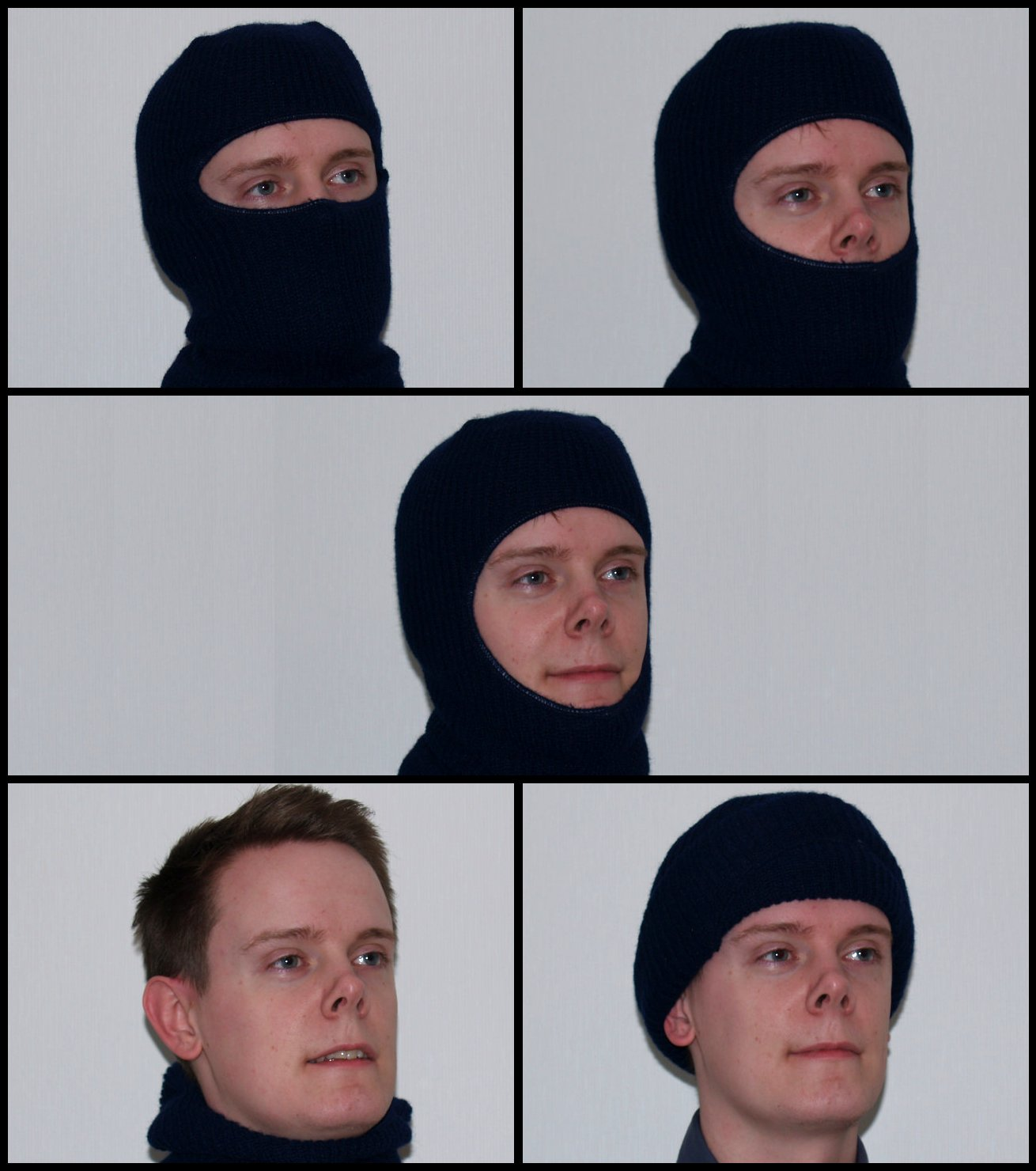
Different ways of wearing a balaclava

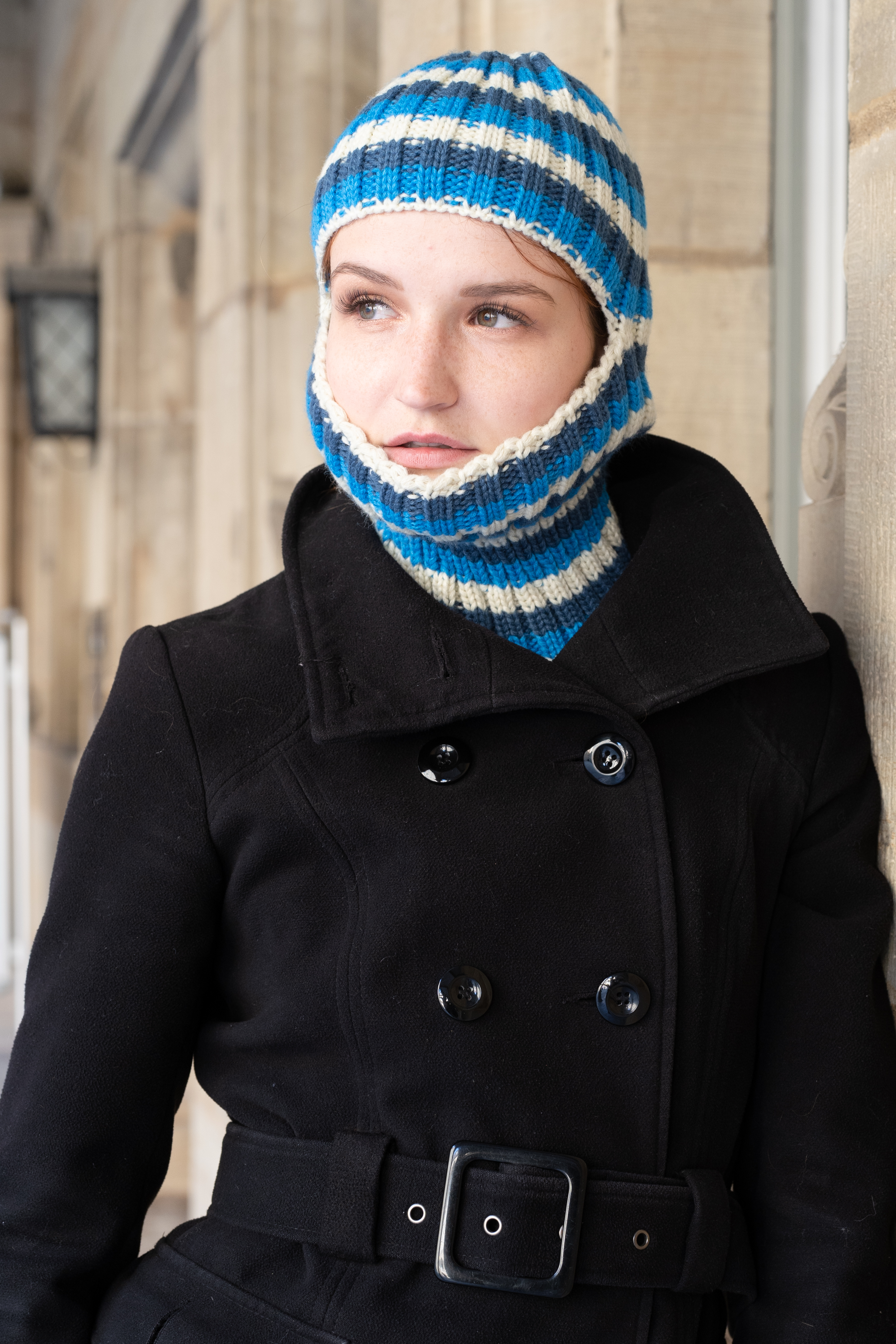
A woman modeling a knitted balaclava

A balaclava, also called a ski mask or racing mask, is a piece of cloth headgear designed to expose only part of the face, usually the eyes and mouth. Depending on style and how it is worn, only the eyes, mouth and nose, or just the front of the face are unprotected. Versions with enough of a full face opening may be rolled into a hat to cover the crown of the head or folded down as a collar around the neck. It is commonly used in alpine skiing, snowboarding, motorsport and motorcycle racing.

== History ==
Similar styles of headgear were known in the 19th century as the Uhlan cap worn by Polish and Prussian soldiers, and the Templar cap worn by outdoor sports enthusiasts.

The name comes from their use at the 1854 Battle of Balaclava during the Crimean War, referring to the town of Balaklava near Sevastopol in Crimea, where British troops there wore knitted headgear to keep warm. Handmade balaclavas were sent over to the British troops to help protect them from the bitter cold weather. The troops required this aid, as their own supplies (warm clothing, weatherproof quarters, and food) never arrived in time. According to Richard Rutt in his History of Handknitting, the name "balaclava helmet" was not used during the war but appears much later, in 1881.

== Uses ==
=== Warmth ===
Thin Balaclavas can be used under motorcycle, snowmobile, ski, and snowboard helmets for warmth in cool or winter conditions.

=== Sports ===
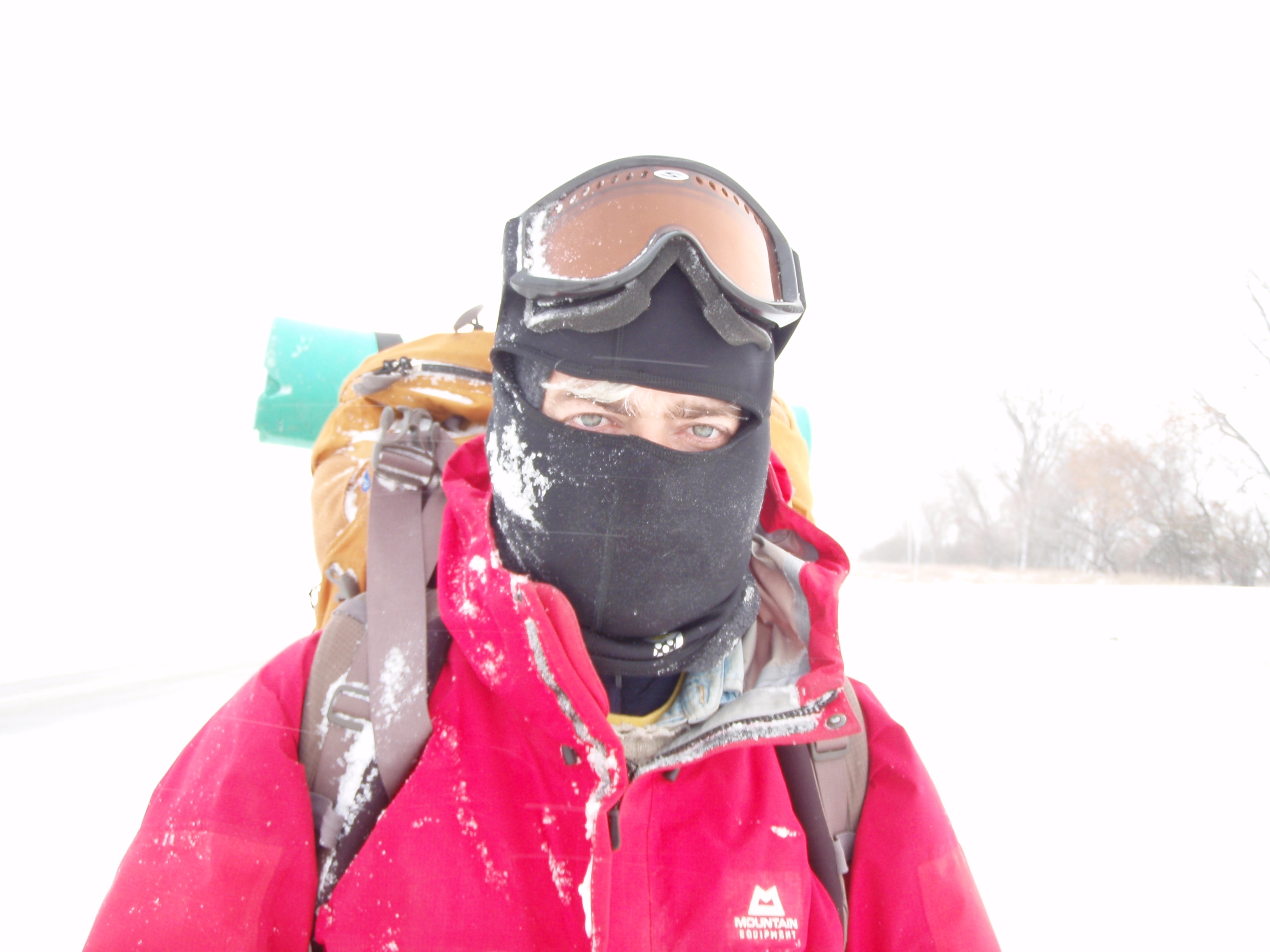
Balaclava worn during a snowstorm

Many skiers, snowboarders, cyclists, and runners wear balaclavas in cold weather for warmth. They protect the head, face, and neck from wind and low temperatures and can fit easily under helmets. These sports balaclavas can be full balaclavas, which cover the entire head leaving only the eyes uncovered, or half-balaclavas, which leave the forehead free, but cover most of the head. Key elements of sports balaclavas are that they are warm, windproof, and moisture-wicking.

=== Racing ===
Race drivers in Fédération Internationale de l'Automobile sanctioned events must wear balaclavas made of fire-retardant material underneath their crash helmets. In racing events, hill-climbs, special stages of rallies and selective sections of cross-country events entered on the International Sporting Calendar, all drivers and co-drivers must wear overalls as well as gloves (optional for co-drivers), long underwear, a balaclava, and shoes homologated to the FIA 8856-2000 standard.

=== Concealment ===
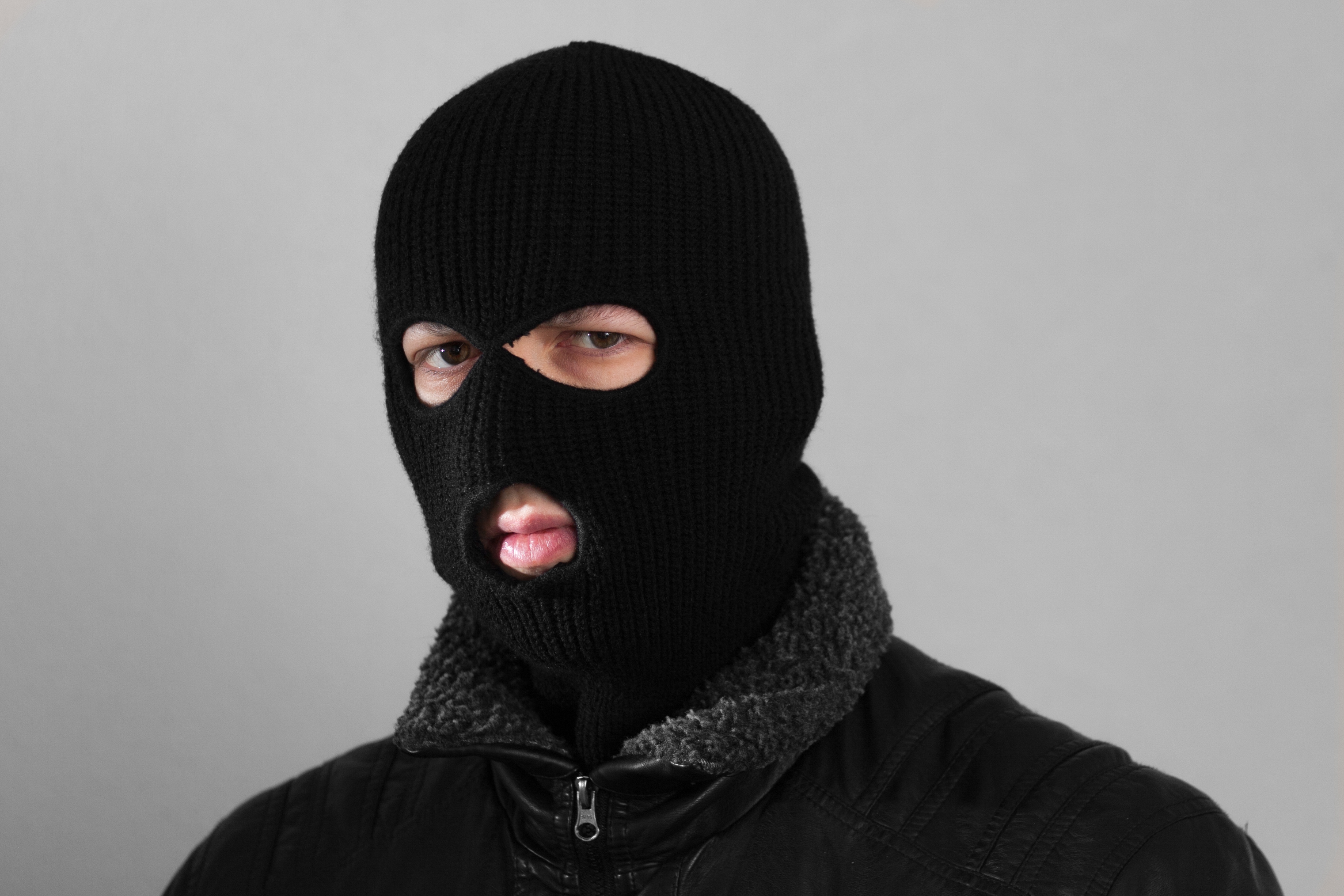
A rib-knit three-hole balaclava

Balaclavas are in certain contexts associated with criminality as gang members have used them to conceal their identity. In 2004, police in Prestwich, England, began demanding that people on the street remove their balaclavas, describing the garment as "extremely threatening". In 2008, police in Kent confiscated a copy of the War on Terror board game partly because of the inclusion of a balaclava, stating that it "could be used to conceal someone's identity or could be used in the course of a criminal act".

=== Military and police ===
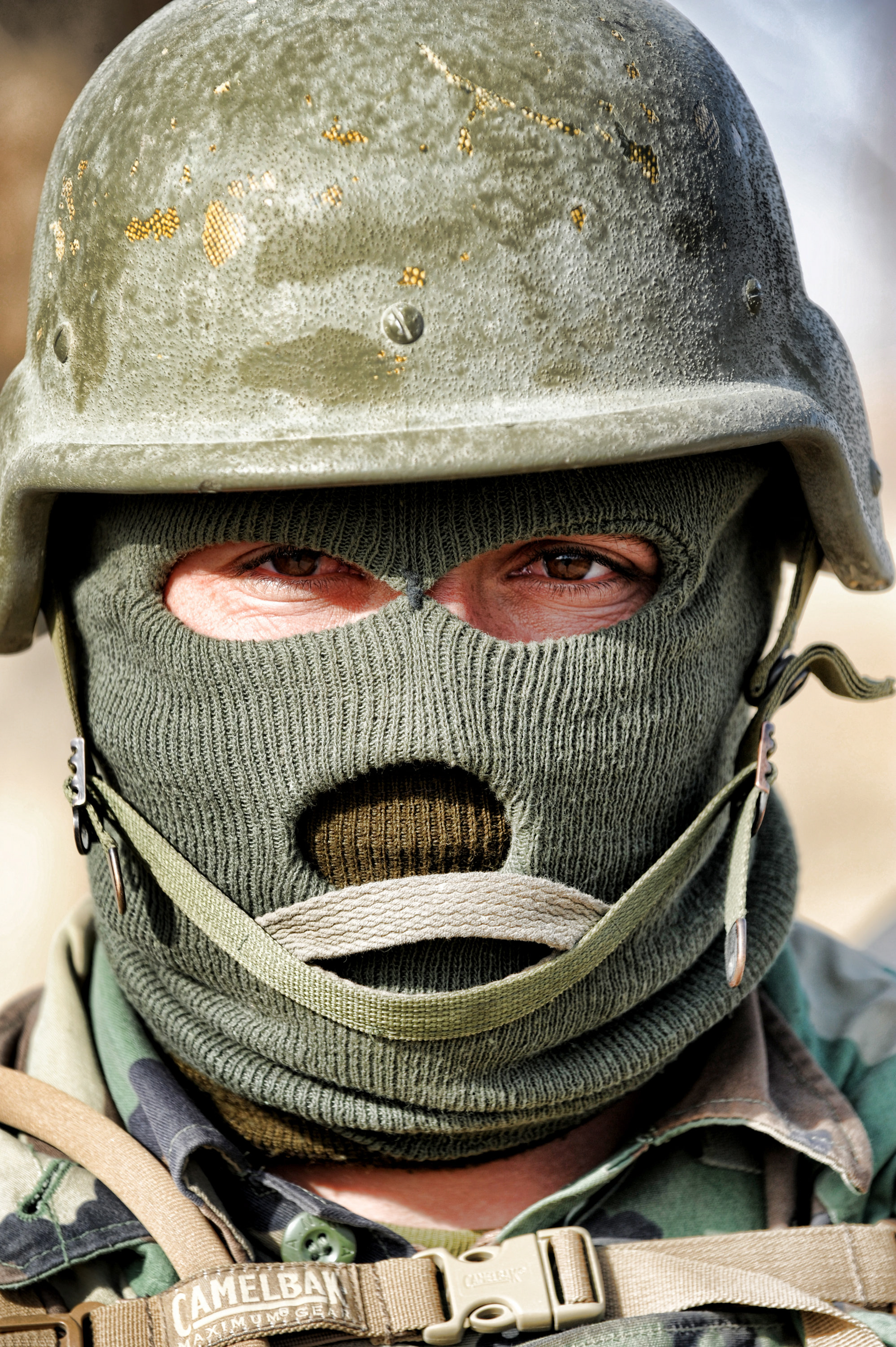
Afghan soldier wearing a balaclava

In South Asia, balaclavas are commonly referred to as monkey caps because of their typical earth tone colours, and the fact that they blot out most human facial features. Monkey caps sometimes have a small, decorative, woollen pom-pom on top. They are commonly worn by troops on Himalayan duty for protection from the cold.

In December 2006, the United States Marine Corps began issuing balaclavas with hinged face guards as part of the Flame Resistant Organizational Gear program.

In the Soviet Union, the balaclava became a part of standard OMON (special police task force) uniform as early as the Perestroyka years of the late 1980s. The original intent was to protect the identity of the officers to avoid intimidation from Russian organized crime. Because of increased problems with organized crime of the 1990s, TV shots of armed men in black balaclavas became common. Armed Russian police commonly conduct raids and searches of white-collar premises (typically in Moscow) while wearing balaclavas. Such raids have therefore come to be known in Russia as "maski shows", an allusion to a popular comic TV show of the 1990s.

Balaclavas are often used by police battling drug cartels and gangs in Latin America to conceal their identity and protect their families.

During immigration enforcement operations in 2025, agents of U.S. Immigration and Customs Enforcement and other federal officers were often seen wearing balaclavas or other face coverings that left them unidentifiable. Officials said the coverings were used to protect agents and their families from online harassment and doxxing; critics said the practice undermined accountability and raised concerns that impersonators could pose as officers. In September 2025, California enacted the No Secret Police Act, which prohibited most law enforcement officers, including federal immigration agents, from wearing ski masks, neck gaiters, and other identity-concealing facial coverings while on duty; in February 2026 a federal judge blocked the state from enforcing that prohibition against federal officers because the law did not also apply to state police, and in September 2026 the governor signed a revised ban written to cover both.

=== Fashion ===
Knitted balaclavas were featured in some collections at the 2018 New York Fashion Week.

Balaclavas gained newfound popularity as a fashion accessory in the United States and Europe during the early 2020s.

== In art and performance ==
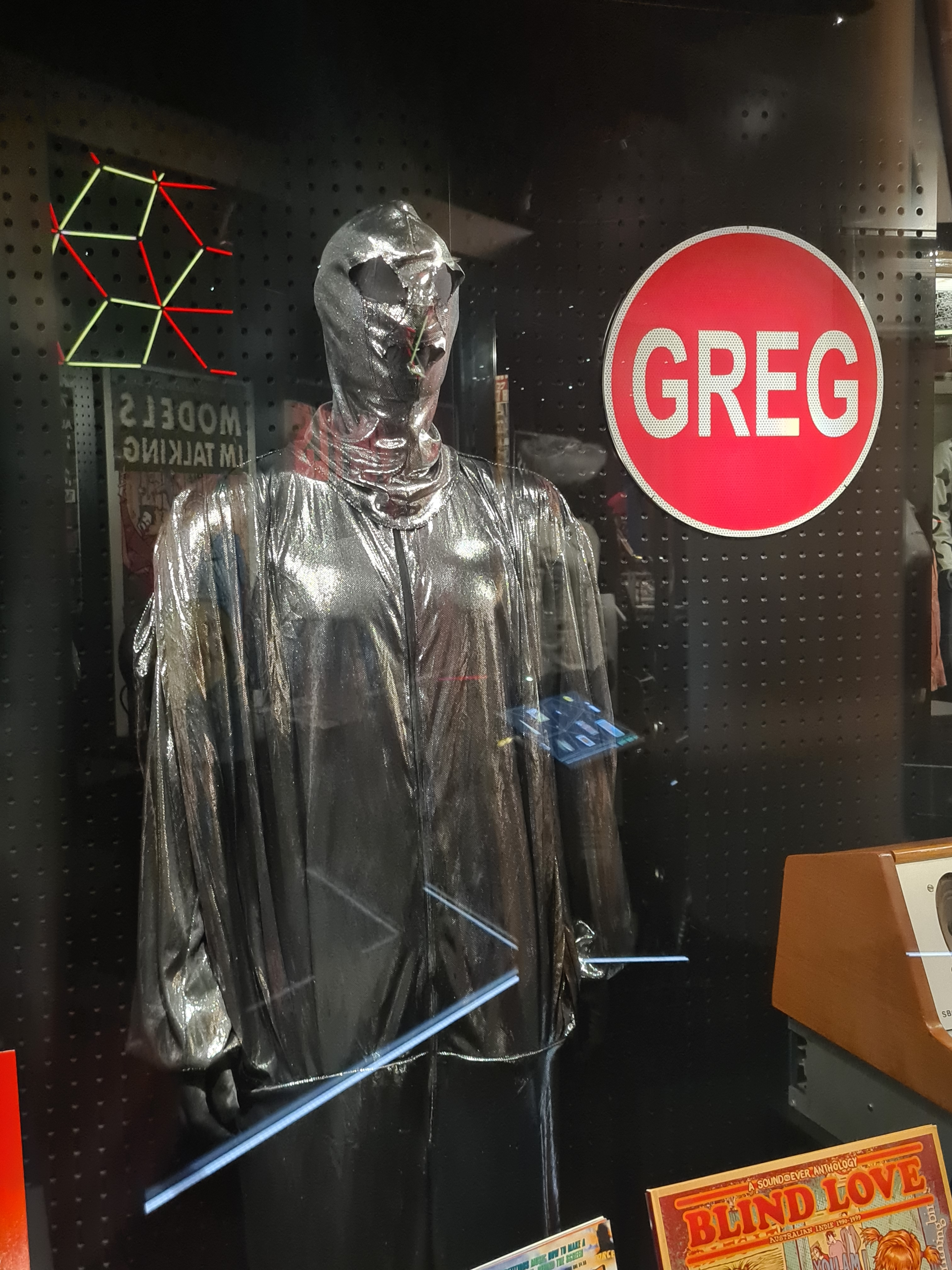
A TISM costume featuring a balaclava

The Australian band TISM utilised balaclavas as part of their onstage image and to conceal their identities, often adorning their balaclavas with added features such as spikes. In similar fashion, the Russian feminist and performance art group Pussy Riot, also utilised colourful balaclavas, in order to remain anonymous, which became part of their image, with one member stating "You put on the mask – and you become Pussy Riot. You take it off – and you are no longer Pussy Riot."

The American artist Mark Jenkins has dressed some of his life-size figures in balaclavas and ski masks. Reviewing his 2015 exhibition at Lazarides in London, Londonist described one figure as "menacing with a baseball bat over a shoulder, while his balaclava-clad compatriot lies on the floor drawing a picture". At a Los Angeles show the same year, "a ski-masked adult has rested his baseball bat against the wall, which he, too, leans on while reading a book".

== See also ==
- List of hat styles
- Anti-flash gear
- Anti-mask laws
- Facekini
- Keffiyeh (traditional Middle Eastern headwear)
- Knit cap
- Mask
- Neck gaiter
- "Ski mask" toque—Canadian English; also commonly worn when using snowmobiles; typically a three-hole balaclava with generous neck tube for maximal wind protection
