= Visard =

16th century European mask for women

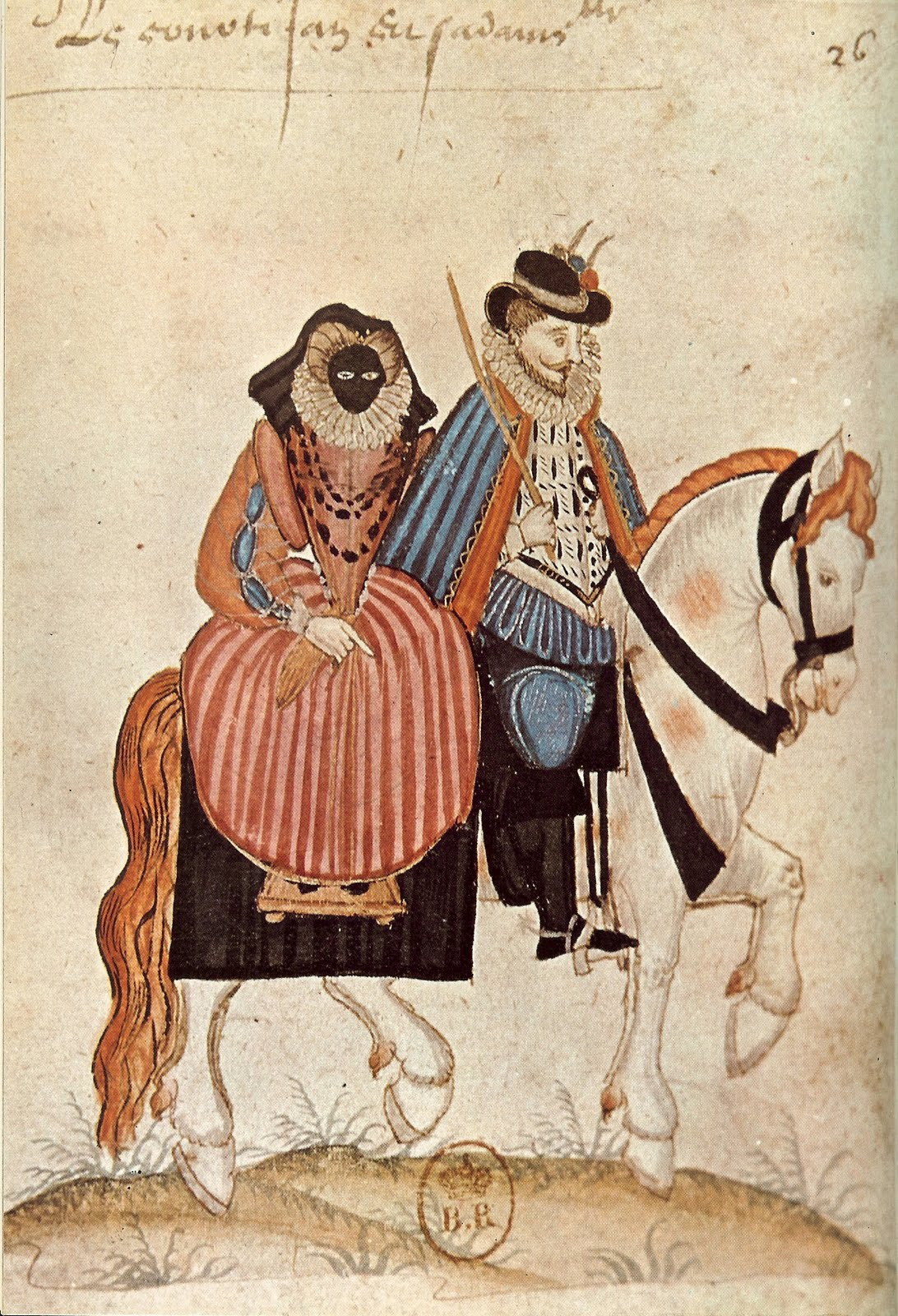
A 16th-century woman wears a visard while riding with her husband.

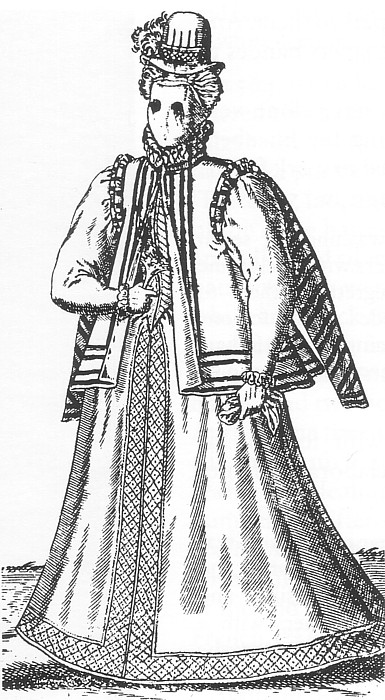
A woman wearing a visard, as engraved by Abraham de Bruyn in 1581.

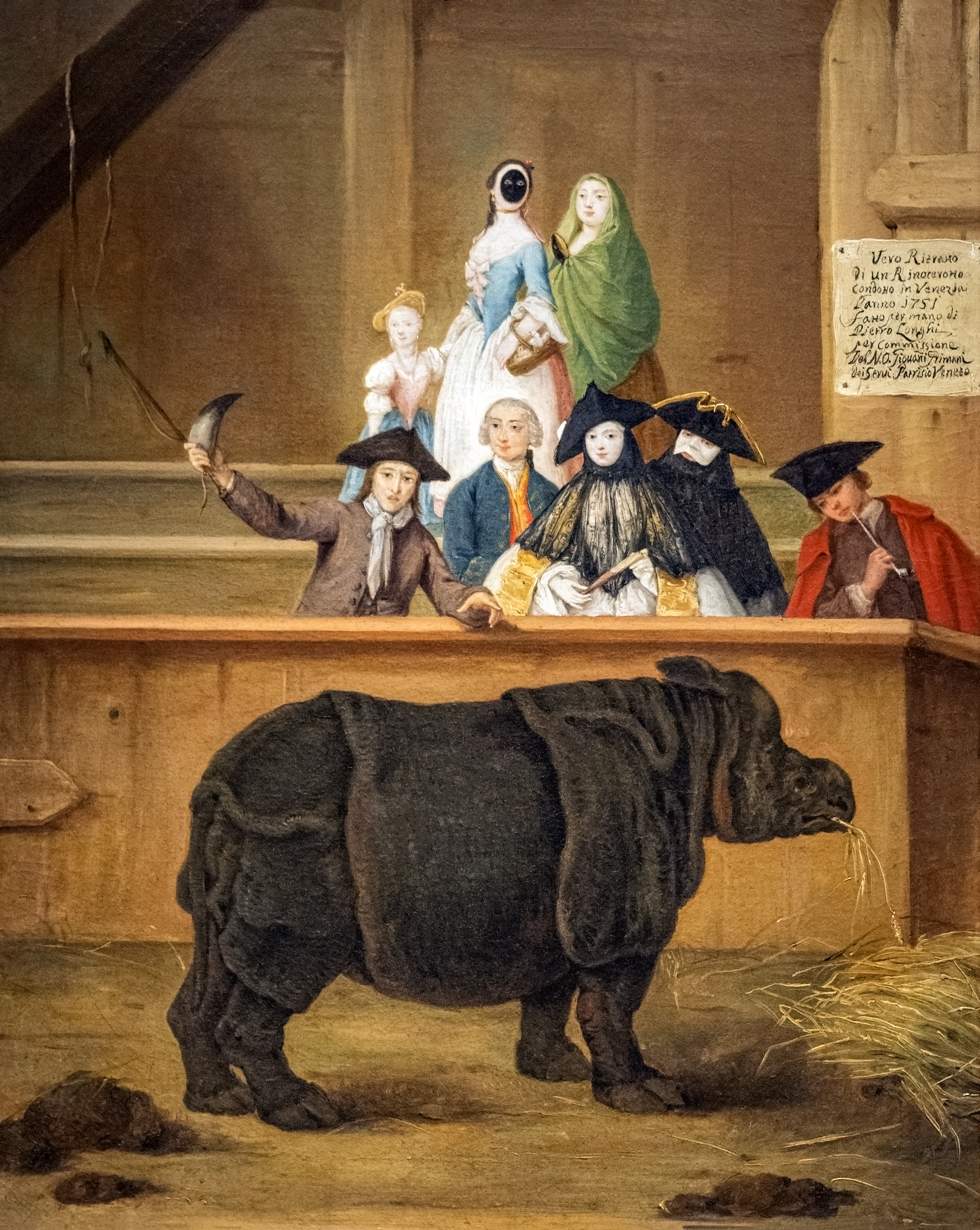
A woman wearing a moretta muta appears in this 1751 painting by Pietro Longhi.

A visard, also known as a vizard, is an oval mask of black velvet which was worn by travelling women in the early modern period to protect their skin from sunburn, as a tan suggested that the bearer worked outside and was hence poor. Performers in court masques also disguised themselves with masks called visards, recorded in England as early as 1377. Visards were either held in place by a fastening or ribbon tie, or the wearer clasped a bead attached to the interior of the mask between their teeth.

The practice did not meet universal approval, as evidenced in this excerpt from a contemporary polemic:

When they use to ride abroad, they have visors made of velvet ... wherewith they cover all their faces, having holes made in them against their eyes, whereout they look so that if a man that knew not their guise before, should chance to meet one of them he would think he met a monster or a devil: for face he can see none, but two broad holes against her eyes, with glasses in them.

— Phillip Stubbes, Anatomy of Abuses (1583)

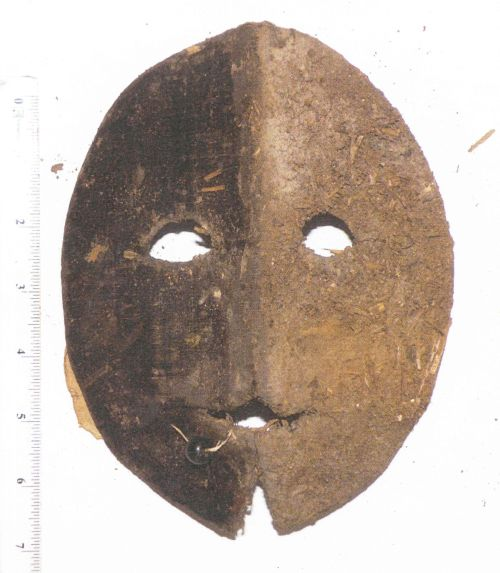
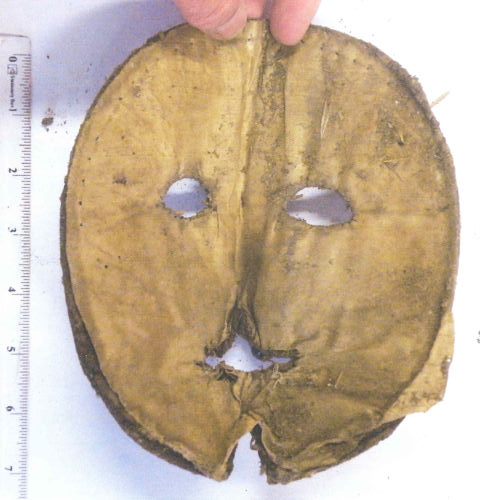
A visard recovered from inside the wall of a 16th-century building in Daventry, England.

In Venice, the visard developed into a design without a mouth hole, the moretta, and was gripped with a button between the teeth rather than a bead. The mask's prevention of speech was deliberate, intended to heighten the mystery of a masked woman.

== Notable wearers ==
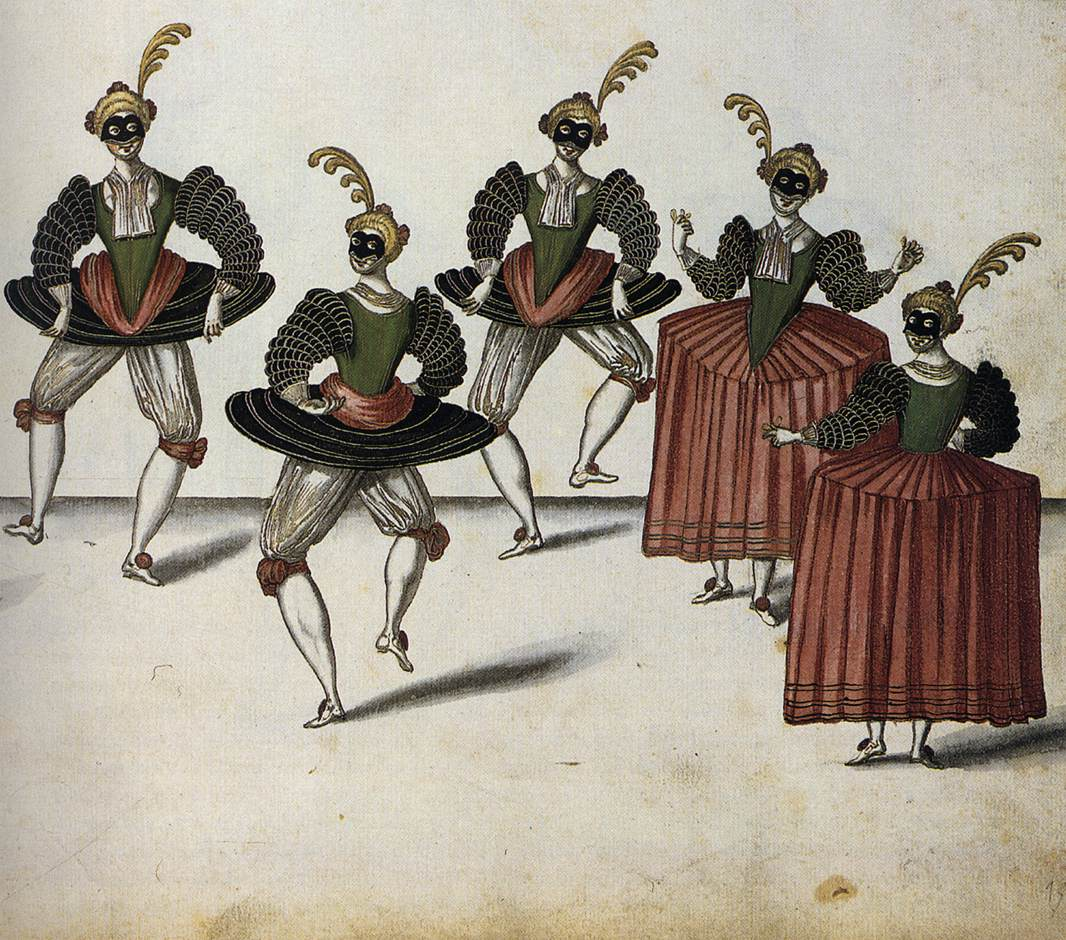
Dancers with visards, The Dowager of Bilbao's Grand Ball, 1626, by Daniel Rabel

A Spanish observer at the wedding of Mary I of England and Philip of Spain in 1554 mentioned that women in London wore masks, antifaces, or veils when walking outside. Masks became more common in England in the 1570s, leading Emanuel van Meteren to write that "ladies of distinction have lately learned to cover their faces with silken masks and vizards and feathers".

Elizabeth I had masks lined with perfumed leather and made with satin supplied by Baptist Hicks. In September 1602, she was observed wearing a mask while walking in the garden at Oatlands Palace. In 1620 the lawyer and courtier John Coke sent clothes and costumes to his wife, including a satin mask and two green masks for their children.

In Scotland in the 1590s, Anne of Denmark wore masks when horse riding to protect her complexion from the sun. These were faced with black satin, lined with taffeta, and supplied with Florentine ribbon for fastening and for decoration. On some later public occasions she did not wear a mask outdoors. In June 1603, after she travelled to England for the Union of Crowns, John Chamberlain said she had done "some wrong" to her complexion "for in all this journey she hath worn no mask". In September, Arbella Stuart praised her for greeting the populace at Newbury with "thankful countenance barefaced to the great contentment of native and foreign people." When the Spanish ambassador Juan Fernández de Velasco y Tovar, 5th Duke of Frías, arrived by ship to negotiate the Treaty of London the following year, Anne wore a black mask while observing from a barge on the Thames.

Masks continued to be worn against sunburn, and also at the Stuart court where they were known as "visard masks". Charles I made a household regulation in 1627 to try and prevent ladies entering Henrietta Maria's presence chamber "masked and muffled". Henrietta Maria allowed her favourite, Lucy Hay, Countess of Carlisle, to wear a mask at court after she had smallpox. Visards formed part of costumes for masques at the Stuart court. Henrietta Maria employed a visard maker, John King. He provided masks of coloured leather, and "Venetian" visards, a term which may refer to an Italian technique of modelling soft leather.

Visards experienced a resurgence in the 1660s. In 1663, after attending a play at the Theatre Royal, Drury Lane, Samuel Pepys noted in his diary that as the venue began to fill, Mary Cromwell "put on her vizard, and so kept it on all the play; which of late is become a great fashion among the ladies, which hides their whole face." Later that day, he bought a vizard for his wife.

== See also ==
- 1550–1600 in Western European fashion
- Facekini
