= Burkini =

Swimsuit

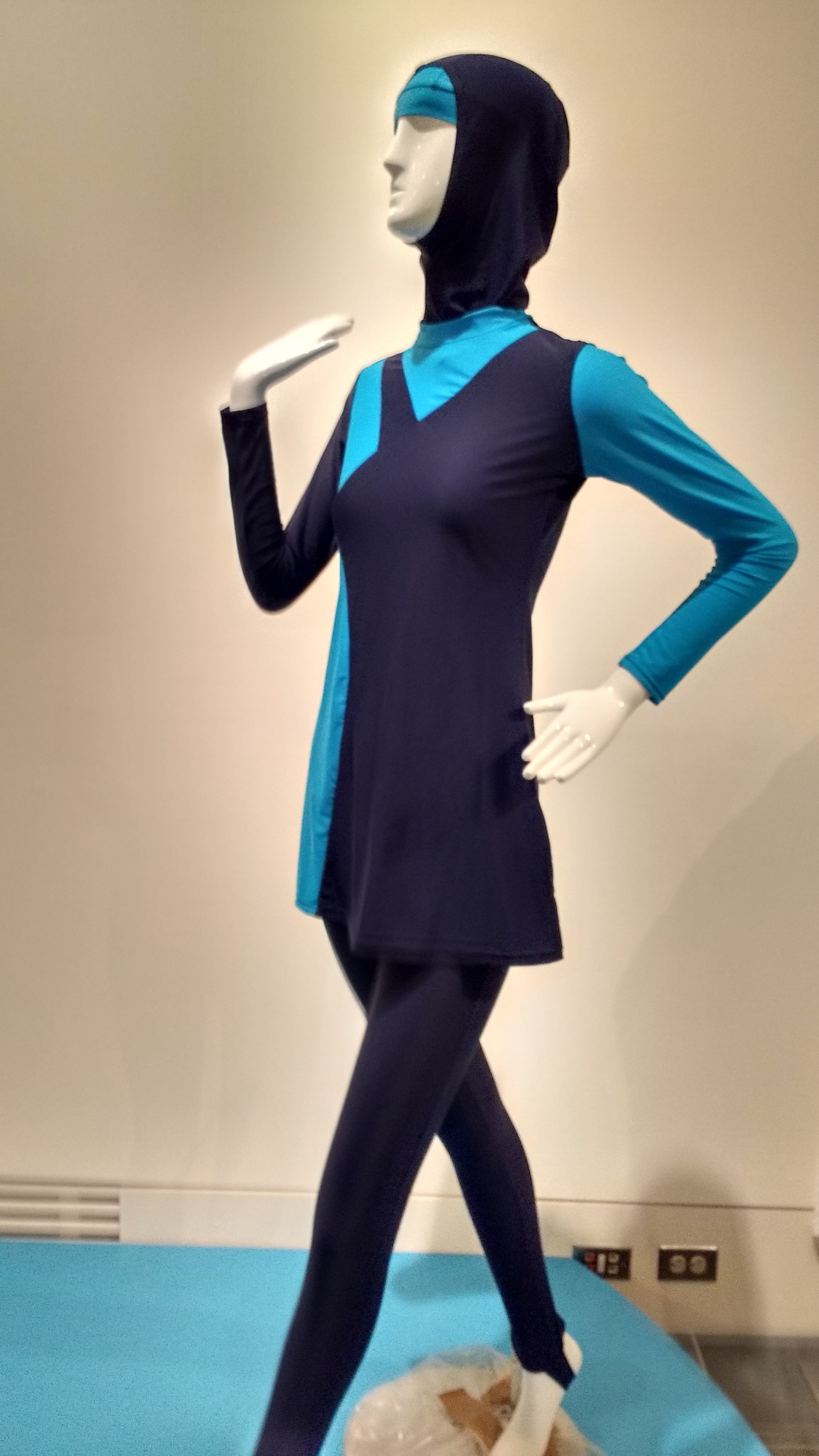
A burkini displayed on a mannequin in a museum at the Chemical Heritage Foundation

A burkini (or burqini; portmanteau of burqa and bikini, though qualifying as neither of these garments) is a style of swimsuit for women. The suit covers the whole body except the face, the hands, and the feet, while being light enough for swimming. This type of swimwear was designed with the intention of creating swimwear for Muslims who observe hijab in this way. The amount of skin covered is about the same as the person wearing a full-body wetsuit and a swimming cap.

The burkini was originally designed in Australia by Aheda Zanetti. Zanetti's company Ahiida owns the trademarks to the words burkini and burqini, but they are sometimes used as generic terms for similar forms of swimwear.

In 2016, a number of French municipalities banned the wearing of burkinis, which sparked international controversy and accusations of Islamophobia. The resulting publicity caused a significant increase in sales, especially sales to non-Muslims and to survivors of skin cancer. Before then, Zanetti's company had sold about 700,000 burkinis worldwide.

== Creation of the burkini ==
The burkini is not a traditional item of clothing. It was originally designed by Aheda Zanetti, an Australian Muslim. Zanetti has indicated that several experiences influenced her creation of the burkini. One was watching her niece play netball, wearing traditional Muslim clothing, including a headscarf. Zanetti recognized that there was a lack of sportswear for Muslim girls and women that would meet the needs of physical activity, so she designed some culturally appropriate activewear clothing. Without clothing that they considered appropriate, women in the Muslim community were uncomfortable going to public pools and beaches. Cultural restrictions on physical activity have been shown to have serious health implications for Muslim women. Zanetti began to think about how to design Muslim-friendly sportswear.

The creation of the burkini was also a response to the 2005 Cronulla riots in Sydney, Australia. On 4 December 2005, a small number of volunteer surf lifesavers were involved in an altercation with some young men of Middle Eastern descent. A verbal exchange escalated, resulting in a pushing match that became a fight. One of the lifeguards was badly hurt after falling and striking his head. The following weekend, a racially incited mob of thousands of white Australians gathered and rioted at North Cronulla beach. Following the riots, Surf Life Saving Australia began an initiative to promote diversity and acceptance on Sydney's beaches by recruiting Muslim lifeguards. Muslim women were uncomfortable with the available swimwear. By 2007, Zanetti had designed a uniform to be worn by female Muslim lifeguards: a special yellow and red two-piece swimsuit that covered the head and body.

== Description ==
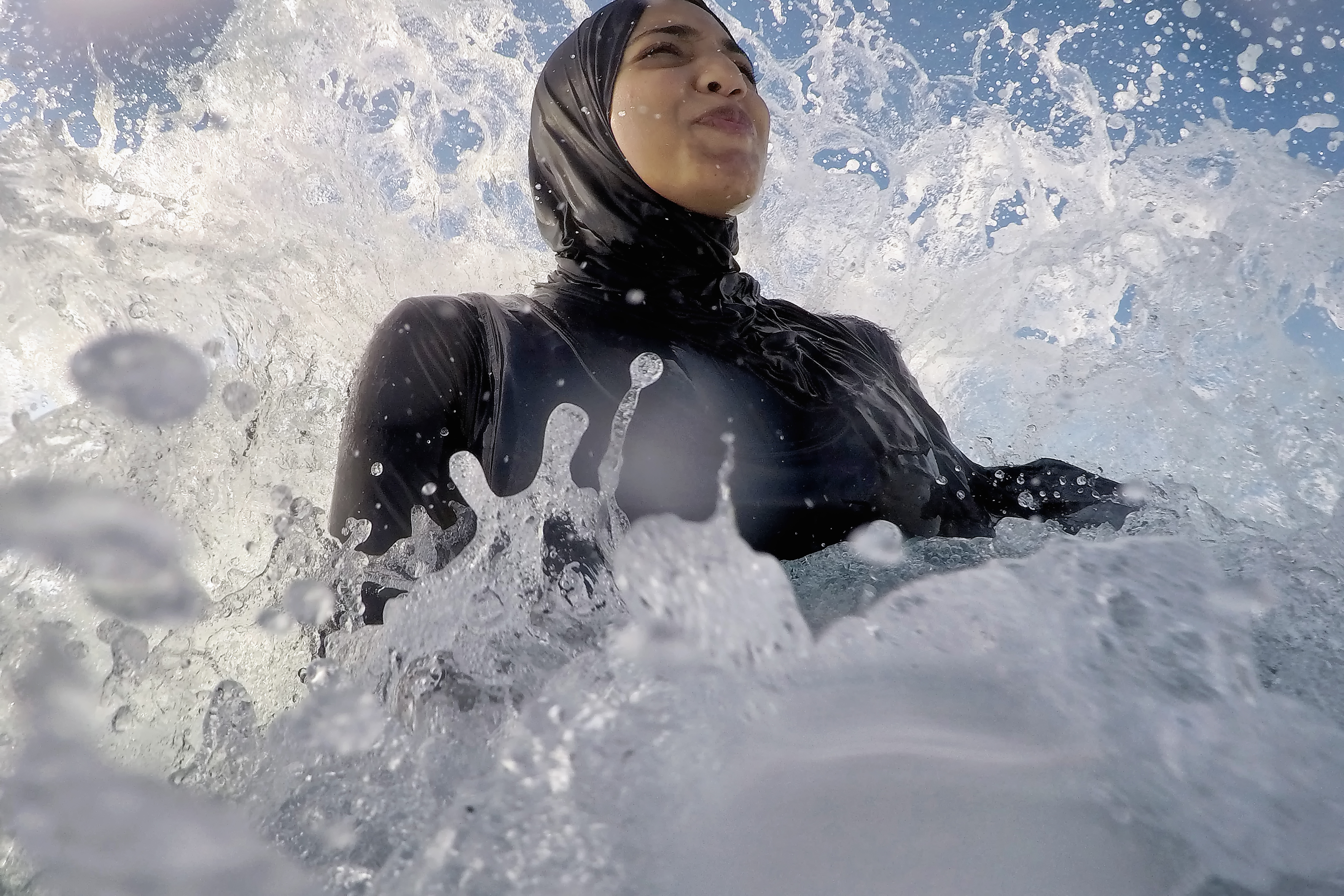
A woman wearing a burkini while swimming in the waves.

Zanetti's Sydney-based company Ahiida owns the trademarks to the words burqini and burkini, but the words have become generic terms for similar forms of modesty swimwear. This type of suit covers the whole body except the face, the hands and the feet, whilst being light enough to enable swimming.

Generally, a pair of straight-legged pants and a long-sleeved tunic tie together so that the tunic will not float up when the swimmer is in the water. A hood, or in some cases a hood and a swim cap, accommodate the wearer's hair and cover the neck, fitting closely around the face. The hood may or may not be attached to the tunic. The suit resembles a full-length wetsuit with a built-in hood, but is somewhat looser. The suits are made of UPF50+ fabric, generally using a finely knit polyester swimsuit fabric rather than the heavier neoprene used for wetsuits.

Depending on the manufacturer and model, a suit can consist of two to four pieces. Aheda Zanetti's original burkini consisted of two pieces: pants and a tunic with an attached hood. It was made from 100 percent polyester. Ahiida now markets three types of burkini (modest fit, slim fit, and active fit) in a variety of colors. The active fit style is more snug than the others and uses a polyester-spandex blend fabric which is coated with Teflon to decrease water resistance.

Other styles of "Islamic" swimwear include the brands Veilkini and MyCozzie. The MyCozzie brand, based in Dubai but designed by Australian Jenny Nicholson, was not designed solely for Islamic women. The basic suit consists of two pieces, and has an optional hood. The material contains both lycra and polyester. In 2009, Zanetti criticized the MyCozzie suit, claiming that its use of lycra could make it heavier and that the optional hood could be unsafe, claims which Nicholson disputed. The Veilkini brand offers skirted two piece suits in multiple styles, made of a spandex and polyester mix.

Other companies that make body-covering suits include Splashgear (California), Acquagym (Brazil), Haşema (Turkey), Nike, and Speedo. Suits such as the Nike "Swift Suit" may be more body-hugging, designed to maximize hydrodynamics, rather than address issues of modesty.

In addition to modesty, full-body swimsuits offer protection from the sun, and in some cases, enhanced athletic performance. They satisfy real needs for populations that include both Muslim and non-Muslim women.

== Modest dress ==
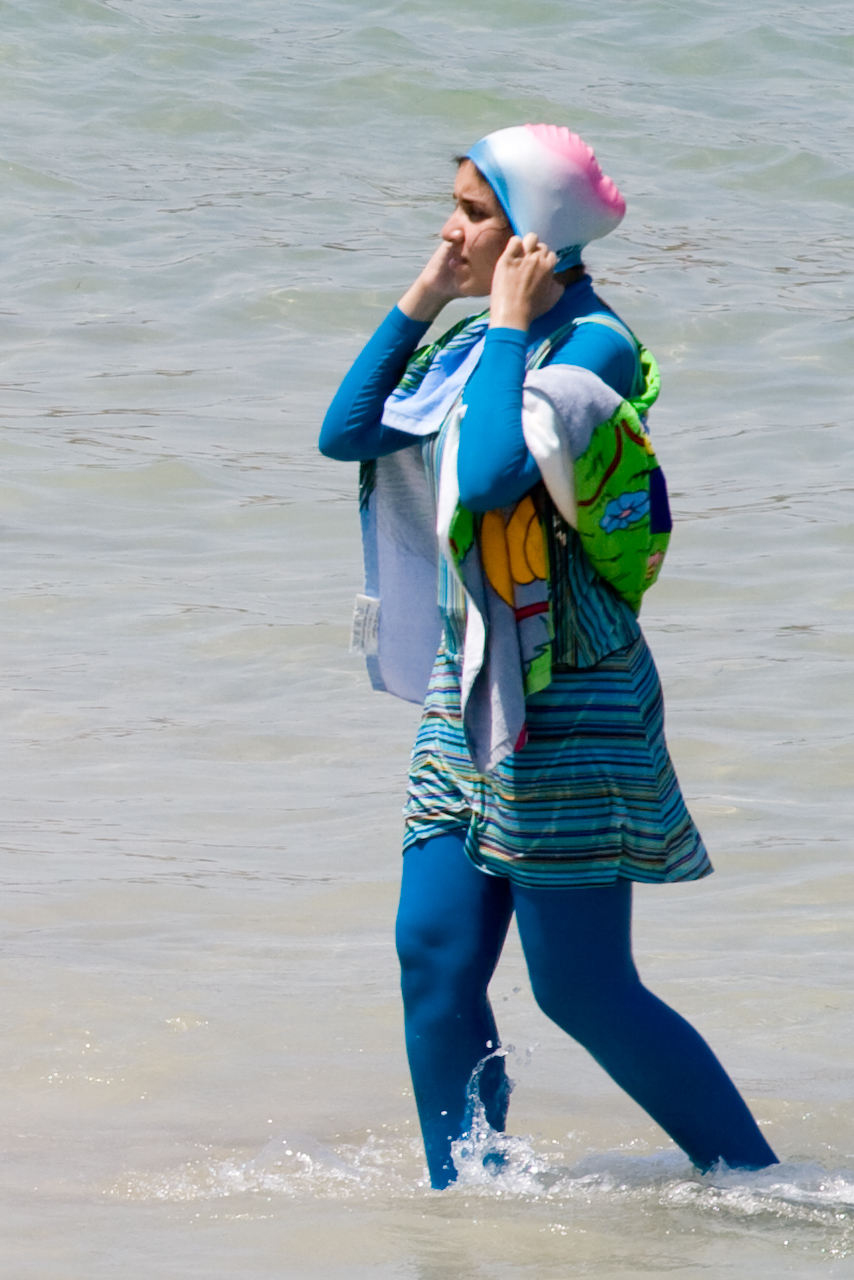
A woman wearing a burkini at a beach

The design of the burkini is intended to be in accord with the hijab. However, what constitutes proper attire for women is a matter of debate in Islamic tradition, and differs by country and community. Some moderate Muslims accept the burqini as meeting a commonly applied standard that requires a woman to cover all parts of her body except her hands and face (including covering her hair) when in mixed company.

Others are concerned that stretchy or clinging fabric reveals the outline of the body. More restrictive Muslims may also advocate that the head covering be long enough to cover the breasts, or that a skirt cover the hips. For similar reasons, pants are sometimes considered overly revealing. Hanafi scholars such as those at Al-Azhar University in Cairo, Egypt, reject full-body swimsuits as allowable wear in mixed company.

An even stricter standard requires covering of the face except for the eyes, the niqab. The most restrictive standard of dress involves covering the entire body with a burqa or chadaree which includes a screen over the face and eyes. The burqa, which is not a swimsuit, provides much more cover than the burkini, although the two are sometimes confused by non-Muslims due to the similarity in names. The issue of women's dress is very much an issue of gendered gaze. In single-sex pools, where men are not allowed, the degree of women's cover is not considered a problem.

"Muslim women are not the only women (or men) who would like some latitude, please, in their choices of swim (and other) attire. Not all people like to share the shape or sight of their body with others, particularly strangers."

"I received my new burqini today... It may seem like such a small thing to some, but I had to fight back the tears today when I tried it on... finally, I can be Muslim and still do all the things I love, comfortably."

As noted by professor of Dress Studies and Fashion Design Heather Marie Akou, arguments about the burkini (and other forms of female dress) are not just about a garment, but also about the symbolism, assumptions, and political implications projected onto it. Discussions of feminism, immigration, and secularism bring forth widely differing views of the burqini and other modesty swimwear. The burqini can be seen as a personal clothing choice, an indicator of women's subjugation, an enabler of women's increased physical freedom, or a militant and fundamentalist religious symbol that challenges a secularist state.

== Users ==
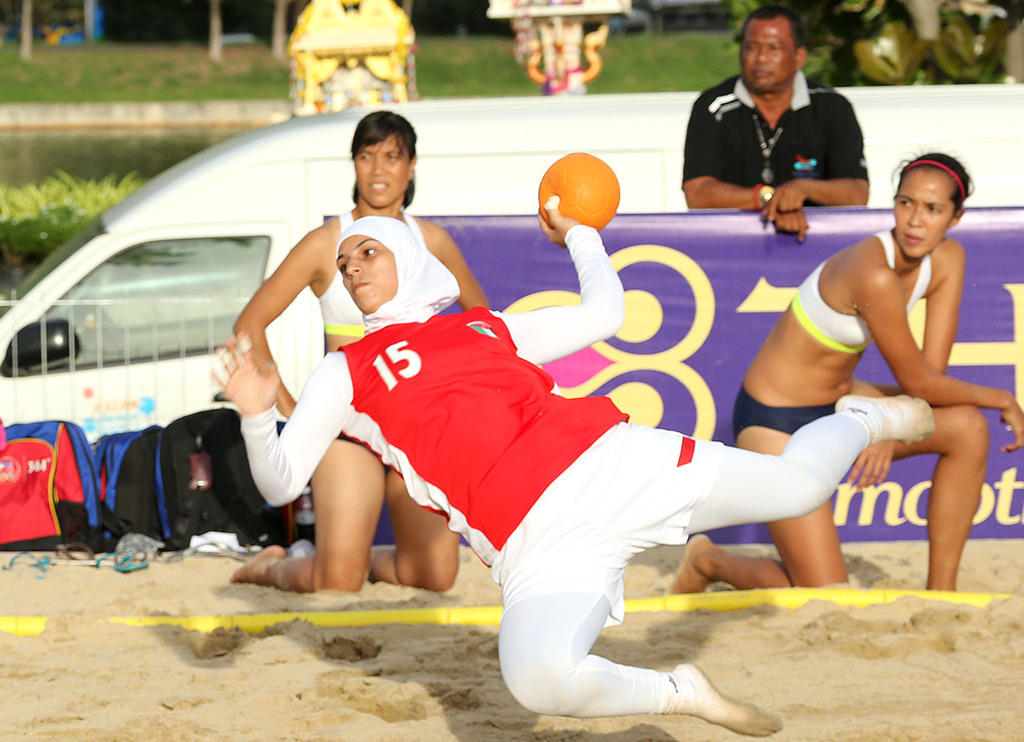
Woman wearing a burkini while playing beach handball, where uniforms are typically bikinis or similar adapted sportswear.

In 2016, Zanetti estimated that 40% of her customer base has been non-Muslim. She stated: "We've sold to Jews, Hindus, Christians, Mormons, women with various body issues. We've had men asking for them, too."

Notable non-Muslim wearers have included Nigella Lawson, who wore a burkini in Australia in 2011, not out of religious observance, but to protect her skin. When introduced at Marks & Spencer stores in Britain in March 2016, burkinis sold out.

=== For modesty ===
The burkini has also found popularity in Israel, both among Orthodox Jews and among Muslims, and is called either burkini or simply "modest swimwear".

=== To avoid sun exposure ===
The burkini has also been adopted by cancer survivors and others who are at high risk of skin cancer. Like other types of sun protective clothing, people who wear burkinis may reduce their risk of skin cancer.

In Asia, where light-colored complexions are fashionable, the burkini is used by women who want to be outside without tanning. They may pair it with a facekini to avoid having a darker-skinned face. It has also been worn by celebrities to avoid sunburns or UV-induced skin damage, which can lead to premature skin aging.

== By country ==
=== France ===
In August 2009, a woman in France was prevented from swimming in a public pool wearing a burkini, amidst ongoing controversy about Muslim dress. The action was justified by reference to a law that forbids swimming in street clothes. The controversy over the burkini in France may also be seen as reflecting broadly held French attitudes against religious expression in public. French law emphasizes the importance of creating a "religiously neutral arena" in which people are expected to appear similar, as well as being treated equally. In this, France differs significantly from countries such as the United States, which emphasizes individual freedom of choice about whether to express religious sentiments.

In August 2016, the mayor of Cannes banned the swimsuits, claiming a possible link to Islamic extremism. At least 20 other French towns, including Nice, subsequently joined the ban. Following this, dozens of women were issued fines, with some tickets citing not wearing "an outfit respecting good morals and secularism"; furthermore, some women were verbally attacked by bystanders when they were confronted by the police. Enforcement of the ban also hit beachgoers wearing a wide range of modest attire besides the burkini, such as an ordinary long-sleeved shirt and leggings worn over a typical swimsuit. The media reported that in one case, armed police forced a woman to remove the burkini she was wearing over her clothes on a beach in Nice. The mayor of Nice's office denied that she was forced to do so, and the mayor condemned what he called the "unacceptable provocation" of wearing such clothes in the aftermath of the Nice terrorist attack. As of August 2016, the ban enacted by the commune of Villeneuve-Loubet has been suspended by France's highest administrative court, setting a potential precedent for further legal challenges.

==== Reactions ====
The ban was supported by a number of French politicians, including the socialist prime minister Manuel Valls, who said: "The burkini is not a new range of swimwear, a fashion. It is the expression of a political project, a counter-society, based notably on the enslavement of women." Some commentators in France criticized the bans, and reports of Muslim women being stopped by police for wearing headscarves and long-sleeved clothes on beaches caused outrage among members of the French Socialist Party and rights groups. A poll showed that 64% of the French public supported the bans, while another 30% were indifferent.

The bans and their enforcement prompted criticism and ridicule abroad, particularly in English-speaking countries. A New York Times editorial called French politicians' "paternalistic pronouncements on the republic's duty to save Muslim women from enslavement" bigotry and hypocritical. Other Muslim commentators, particularly Muslim women, have argued that the burkini gives women who do not wish to expose their body for religious or other reasons the freedom to enjoy the beach.

Human Rights Watch also criticized the ban, stating that it "actually amounts to banning women from the beach, in the middle of the summer, just because they wish to cover their bodies in public. It's almost a form of collective punishment against Muslim women for the actions of others."

Some drew parallels between the burkini ban and the French ban of the Catholic soutane some 111 years earlier after the 1905 French law on the Separation of the Churches and the State.

=== Germany ===
In December 2018, the municipality of Koblenz, citing hygiene concerns, voted to ban the burkini in public swimming pools in 2018, with CDU, AfD and Freie Wähler councillors forming a majority for the decision.

Protests were held against the decision gathering some 70 individuals from Central Council of Muslims in Germany, Social Democratic Party of Germany and Alliance 90/The Greens. In June 2019, German courts overruled and lifted the ban citing violations to the German constitution's call for equality.

In June 2018, a school in western Germany created controversy after it was found handing out burkinis to students who otherwise refused to attend swim classes. Some argued that the school is sending a misogynistic message, including Julia Klöckner, a member of Angela Merkel's Christian Democratic party, who said the school creates a "misogynistic understanding in a place where children and teenagers are supposed to learn the opposite." Others, including Franziska Giffey, the German minister of family affairs, support the school's decision saying, "the most important thing is the well-being of the children, and that means that all learn to swim." The school has stated that burkinis were paid for by private donations.

=== Morocco ===
In 2014 some private pools in Morocco's tourist hotspots prohibited the wearing of burkinis, citing "hygiene reasons", which also sparked political controversy.

=== Switzerland ===
In December 2017, the Swiss city of Geneva passed a law requiring swimmers to wear swimsuits that do not go lower than the knee and keep the swimmer's arms bare, which would effectively ban not only burkinis but also the bodyskins used by elite swimmers, swim dresses, rash guards, wetsuits, and other styles of swimsuits. They simultaneously banned topless swimming in the city pools.

The ban refined a rule that went into force in September 2017, which required swimmers to wear "any clothing that is specifically used for swimming". The September rule was prompted by young people swimming in public pools in street wear (e.g., ordinary T-shirts), which had caused concerns about hygiene. The more restrictive ban sparked controversies among some, including Sami Kanaan, the city's socialist administrative advisor, who called the rule a "denial of an open, multicultural and liberal Geneva". Before the ban, councillors were only aware of one person having ever worn a burkini to the city's pools.

== See also ==
- Bathing machine
- Facekini
