= Aheda Zanetti =

Lebanese-Australian fashion designer, creator of the burkini

- Born: 1967 (age 58–59); Tripoli, Lebanon
- Occupations: Fashion designer, entrepreneur
- Known for: Creator of the burkini; founder of Ahiida
- Website: ahiida.com

Aheda Zanetti (born 1967 in Tripoli, Lebanon) is a Lebanese-born Australian fashion designer, best known for inventing the burkini (also called burqini) swimwear garment for women and for founding the brand AHIIDA. Her designs focus on enabling Muslim women (and other modest-dress wearers) to participate in sport and leisure on equal terms.

== Early life ==
Zanetti was born in Tripoli, Lebanon, and moved with her family to Australia when she was two years old. She grew up in Sydney.

== Career ==
Zanetti first designed the hijood (a portmanteau of hijab and hood) for Muslim girls to practice sports. In 2004, she launched a series of sportswear for Muslim women under the trademark Ahiida, and founded the company Ahiida Pty Ltd (AHIIDA). Under that brand, she has designed what she named the burqini (or burkini) (a portmanteau of burqa and bikini) for use by Muslim female swimmers. She estimates her sales at more than 700,000 garments since 2008. Burqini and Burkini are registered trademarks owned by Zanetti's company, though they have become generic terms for similar forms of Islamic swimwear.
