= 2007 European heatwave =

Weather event in Southern Europe

Meteorological history
- Duration: June - August 2007
- Heat event
- Max temp: 47.5 °C (117.5 °F), recorded at Nea Filadelfeia and Aspropyrgos, Greece on 26 June 2007

Overall effects
- Areas affected: Greece, Italy, Croatia, Serbia, Ukraine, Hungary, North Macedonia, Bulgaria, Albania, Bosnia and Herzegovina, Montenegro, Romania, United Kingdom and Ireland

The 2007 European heat wave affected most of Southern and the Southeastern Europe. The phenomenon began affecting Italy and Turkey on 17 June and expanded into Greece and the neighbouring countries, all the way to Hungary and Ukraine on 18 June. The costs of the heat wave were estimated at 2 billion euros.

== April 2007 ==
Mainz, Germany recorded an average high of 22.4 °C (72.3 °F) for April, the strongest deviation (+6.2 °C (11.2 °F)) from the 1989-2018 average of any month. It was also the first calendar month without any measured precipitation since February 1959. A high of 29.4 °C (84.9 °F) was reached on 14 April.

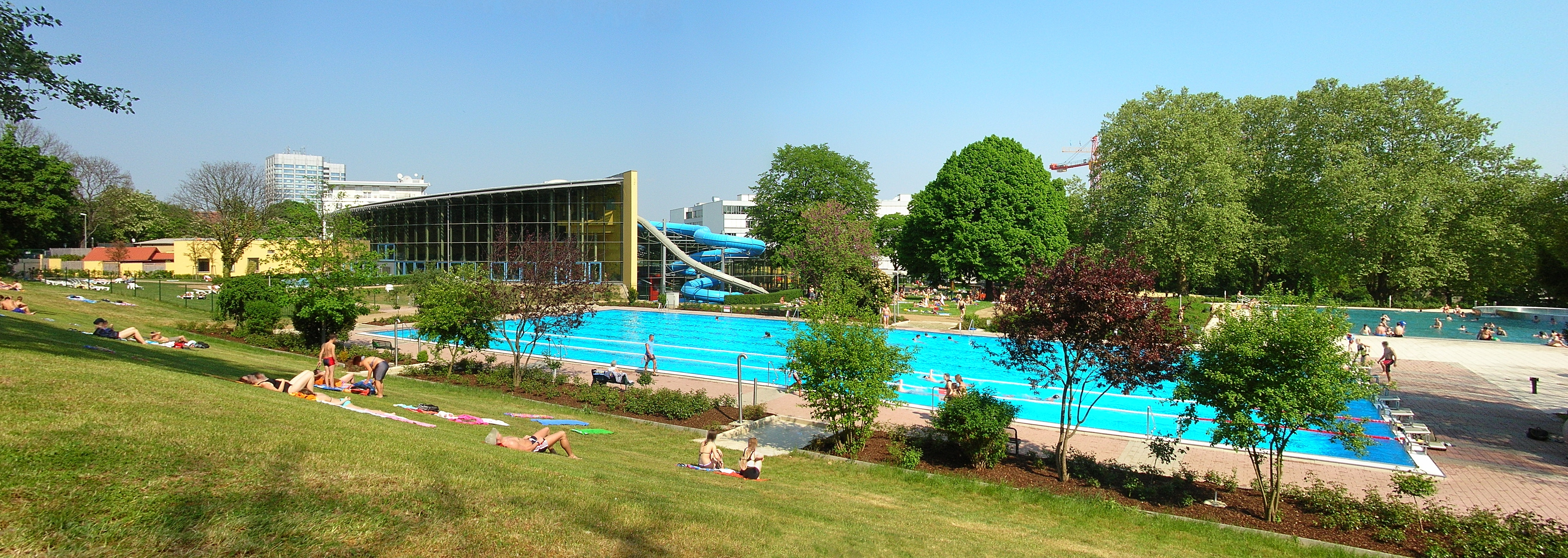
Well-visited public swimming pool in Mainz in late April

== June 2007 ==
Up until 21 June, temperatures generally hovered around 36–39 °C (97–102 °F) in most of the aforementioned countries; however, starting on 22 June, temperatures skyrocketed in this entire region. From this point on, Greece, Italy, Albania, Bulgaria, Serbia, Croatia, Bosnia and Herzegovina, Romania and Turkey experienced record-breaking temperatures in a situation unprecedented even for these nations, typically used to conditions of extreme heat.

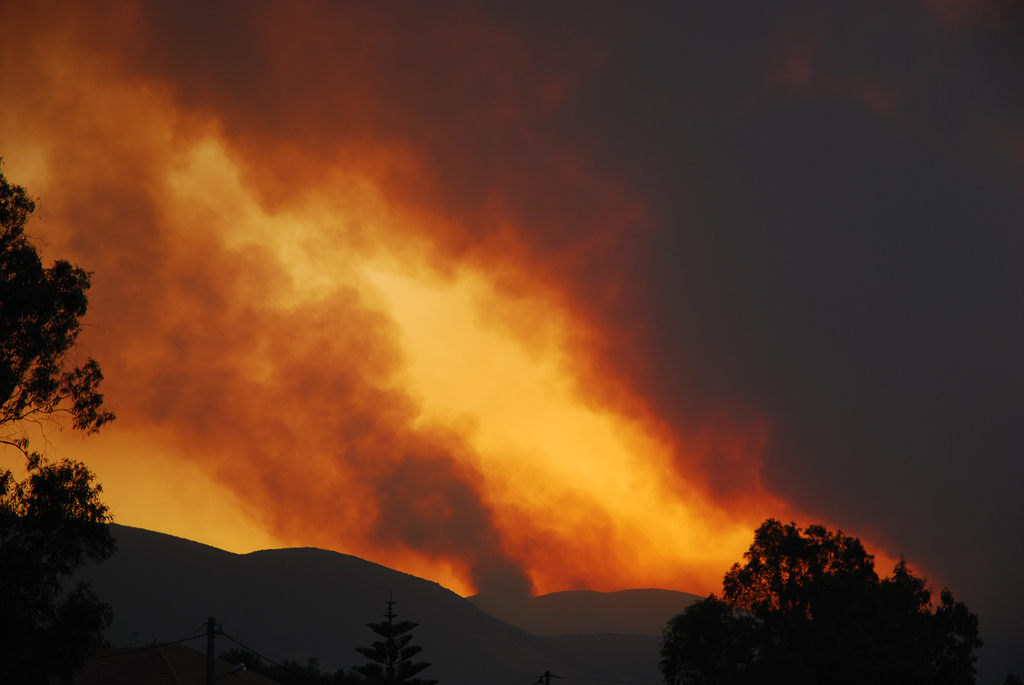
Forest fire burns on the island of Zakynthos in Greece on 25 July 2007

During the weekend of 23–24 June and on 25 June, temperatures soared to 43–44 °C (109–111 °F). By 26 June, however, Greece seemed to bear the brunt of the heatwave with temperatures in Athens reaching 46.2 °C (115.2 °F). The same day, Greece's national power consumption set a new record. Parts of Greece, including neighbourhoods in Athens, suffered from power outages due to high electricity demand and heat damage to the grid. Explosions from overheating transmission towers were implicated in the forest fires ravaging the country. The discomfort was exacerbated by high night-time temperatures, which exceeded averages by up to 8 °C (14 °F), and remained at very high levels for more than half of the 2007 summer.

More than 200 people were hospitalized for heat-related treatment and 18 people died from heat exhaustion. By 28 June northerly winds started blowing from the northwest and temperatures finally began falling, reaching a cooler 39 °C (102 °F). Nonetheless, at a time when everyone believed that the worst part was over, more than 100 fires erupted across the country. Two people perished in the village of Aghia, near the city of Larissa. In the evening of that same day a major wildfire broke out in Mount Parnitha near Athens. By the dawn of 29 June, a significant part of the popular Parnitha National Park had turned into ashes. Temperatures fell by as much as 6 °C (11 °F) and the worst heatwave since records began came to an end leaving Greece reeling upon its disastrous effects.

== July 2007 ==
By late July, temperatures again rose to more than 40 °C (104 °F) in Southern Europe, impacting agriculture, electricity supply, forestry and human health. From 21 to 25 July, temperatures reached or exceeded 45 °C (113 °F). Over 500 deaths in Hungary were attributed to the heatwave. Major wildfires destroyed large forested areas across the region. Six people (including two Canadair pilots) lost their lives while trying to extinguish the flames in Greece. The country's electricity grid nearly collapsed due to exceptional demand for air conditioning. Hundreds of tourists were stranded on the beaches of Apulia, in Southeastern Italy, and had to be rescued by boats.

In Bulgaria, six people were killed in the fires that started on 22 July. An estimated 1,530 fires broke out between 20 and 24 July, three times the yearly average. During the largest fire near Stara Zagora, 50 square kilometres (19 square miles) of pine forest burned for three days, as firefighters were unable to control the fire by conventional means. Strong winds and the extremely dry air quickly sparked new fires. The government requested help from Russia, and Be-200 amphibious water bombers finally managed to contain the blaze near Stara Zagora.

== August 2007 ==
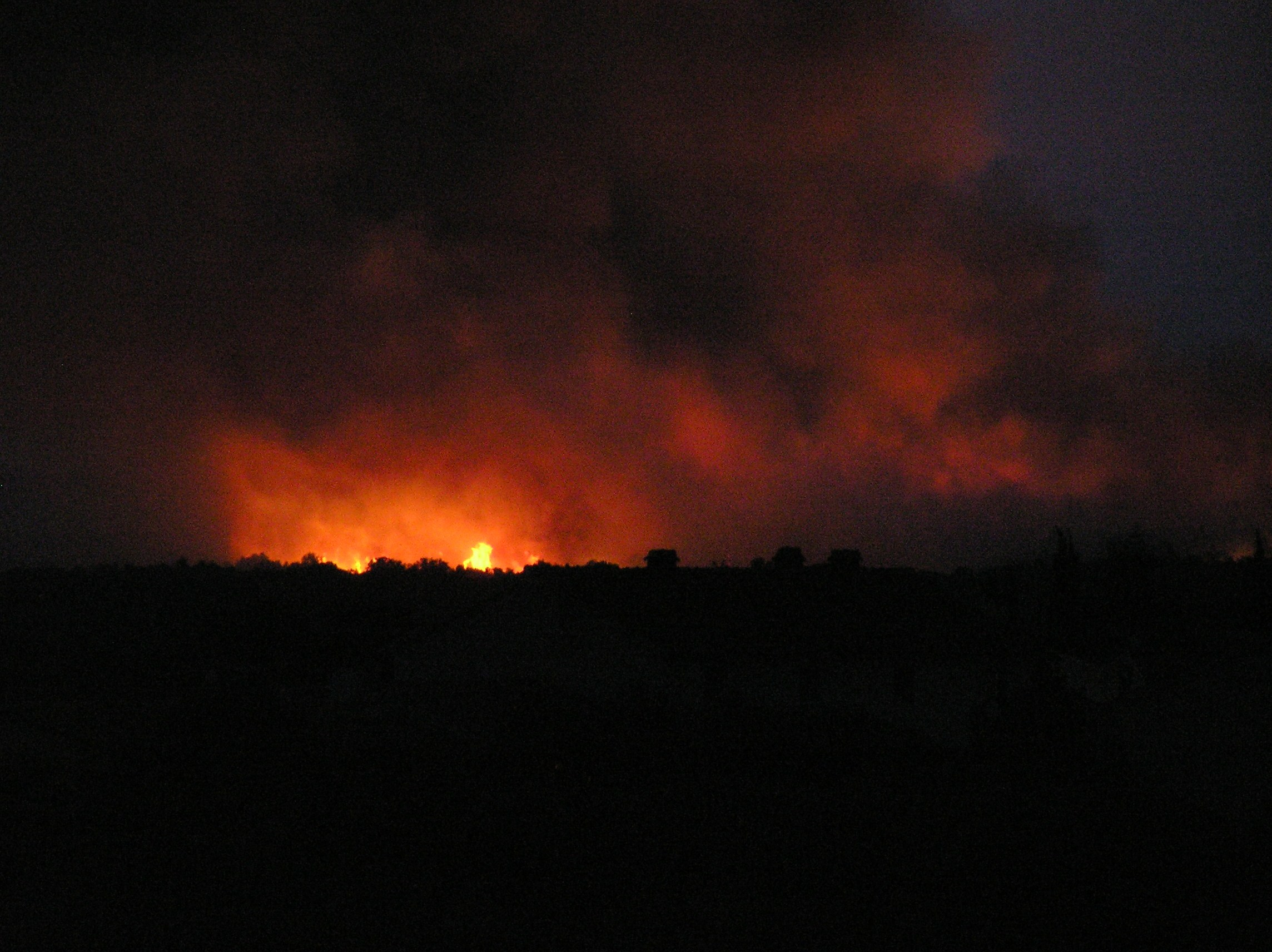
A forest fire in Croatia

In the beginning of August, the Dalmatian coast in Croatia was hit by severe fires, especially in the surroundings of Dubrovnik.

== See also ==
- 2007 Greek forest fires
- 2007 Asian heat wave
