= Sports TV Uganda Limited =

Sports channel, Uganda

Sports TV Uganda Limited was incorporated in October 2007, and has been licensed by the Uganda Broadcasting Council on February 29, 2008. Sports TV has commenced test broadcast on July 14, 2008.

The station is broadcasting sports from around the world, and 24/7, free-to-air. It is privately owned by Bent and Nada Andersen. Sports TV is broadcasting sports programmes compiled by Setanta Africa network, a free-to-air broadcasters' network that is spreading across Africa, with broadcasters in over 20 African countries.

== Information ==
Sports TV is the first sports-only television channel in Uganda. As the last entrant on the Ugandan TV scene, the channel is already very popular and covers the central regions of Uganda, stretching as far as Busia town on Uganda-Kenya border in the north-east, and beyond Kalangala Islands and Masaka town in the south-east parts of the country.

Sports TV has acquired all its broadcasting equipment from ABE Electronica in Italy, including a solid state digital-ready 3KWA transmitter. Sports TV is, as other media houses in Uganda, licensed by Uganda Broadcasting Council, Uganda Communication Commission and Uganda Media Council.

Sports TV entered a frequency and revenue sharing contract with the Vision Group, and was broadcasting as Urban TV and thereafter as Bukedde 2. Due to the breach of contract, Sports TV and Vision Group ended in a protracted legal battle from 2013 until end of 2018, when the Commercial Court of the Republic of Uganda ruled in favour of Sports TV. However, the broadcasting equipment remained at the premises of Vision Group and by the time the court case was under way, Sports TV was unable to retrieve it and continue broadcasting on its own, thus losing its broadcasting license in the process.

Sports TV now operates as a content provider and plans to remain involved in sports production and broadcasting through placement on local TV channels.
