= Anti-flash gear =

Fire-resistant personal protective equipment

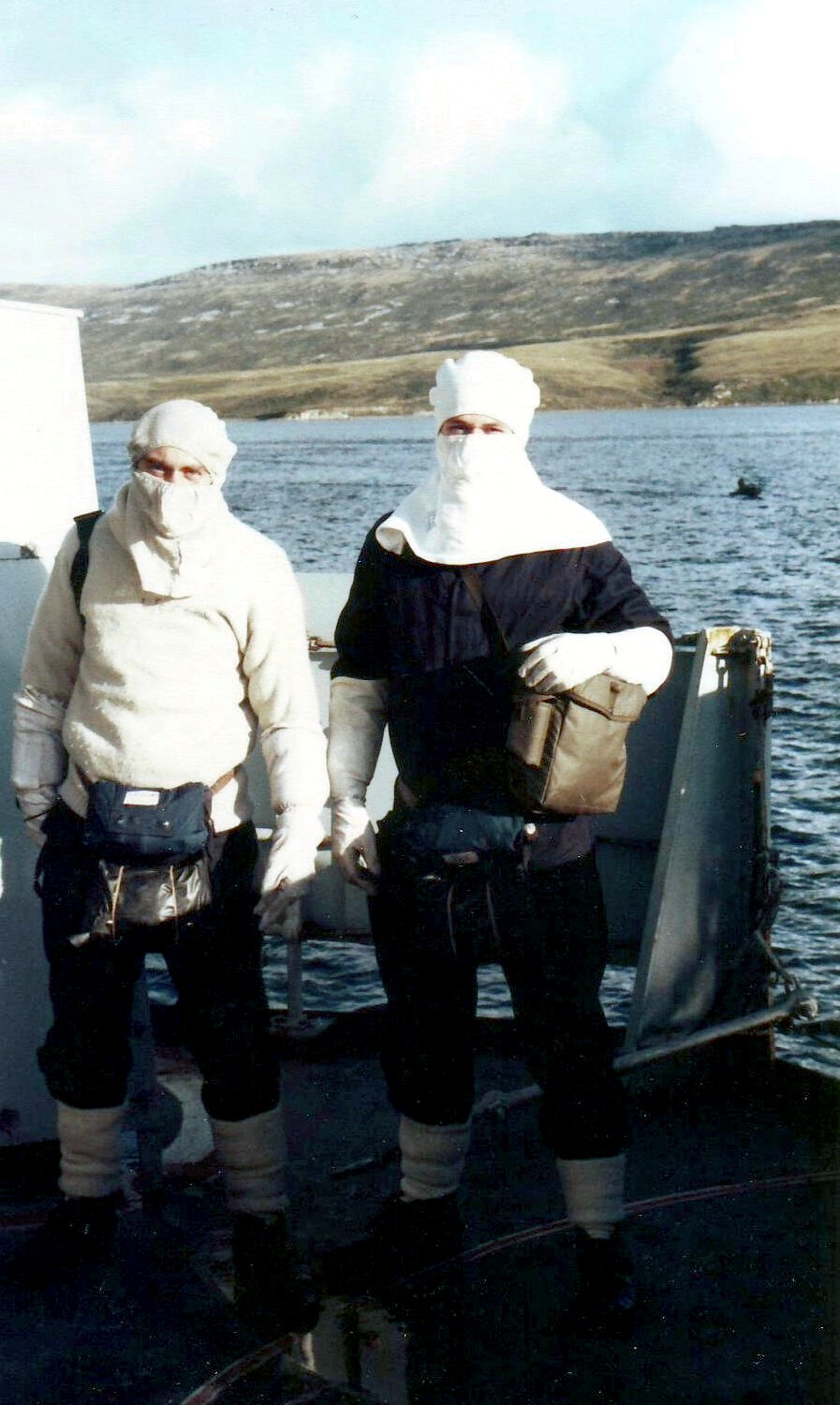
Royal Navy Sailors during the Falklands War wearing anti-flash gear

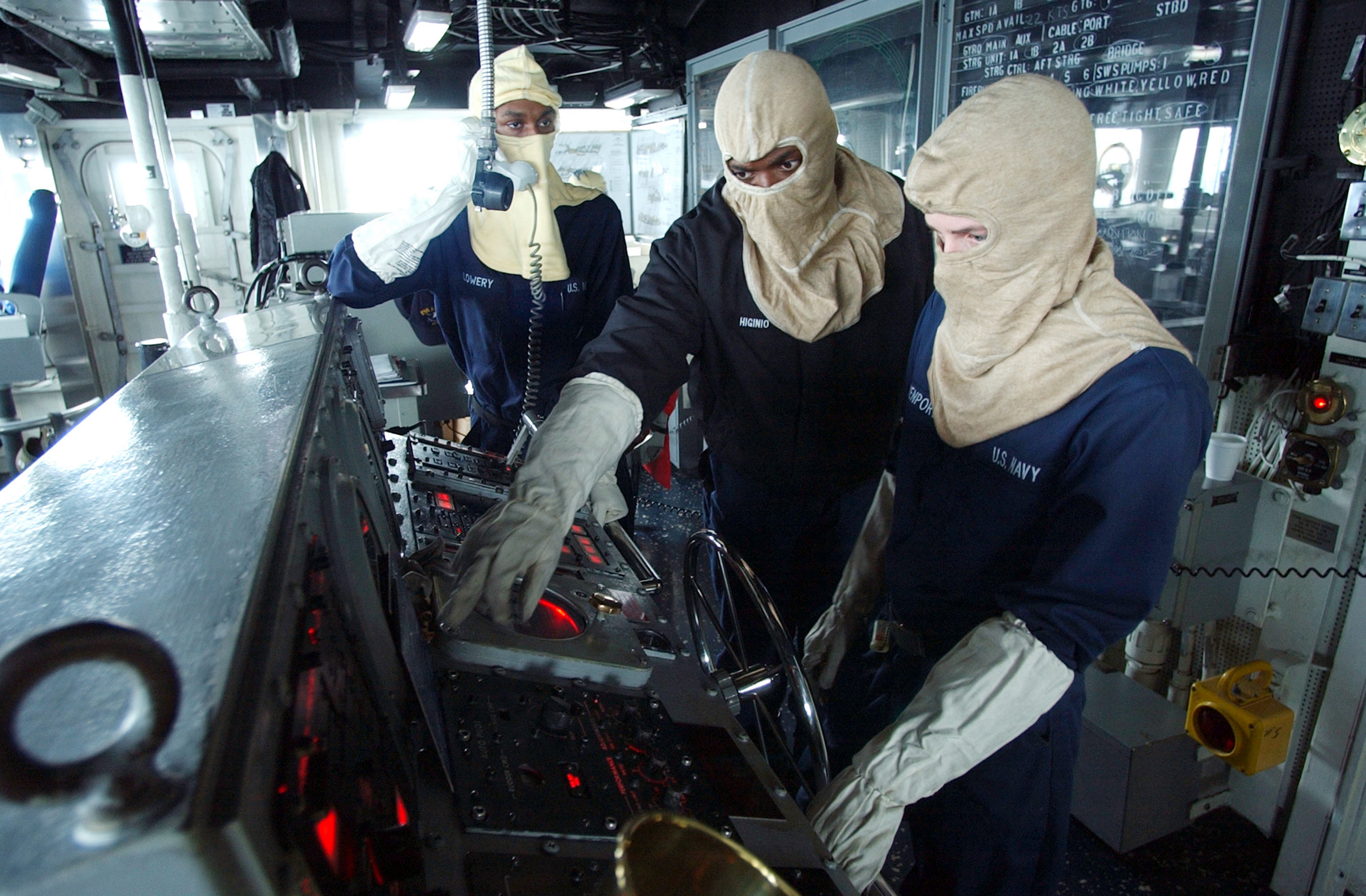
U.S. Navy sailors at their ship's helm wear flash gear during an exercise.

Anti-flash gear, also known simply as flash gear, is basic personal protective equipment consisting of a fire-resistant hood and fire-resistant gloves, nowadays often made of Nomex.

Anti-flash gear protects the head, neck, face and hands from short-duration flame exposure and heat. This equipment is donned by shipboard navy personnel whenever a fire breaks out or during periods of heightened readiness.

== History ==
Anti-flash gear was introduced in the Royal Navy following the Battle of Jutland during the First World War, when a number of British warships had been destroyed or damaged by flash from burning cordite propellant passing through the shell handling room into the magazine. It was found that the anti-flash hoods and gloves were more effective if flame-proofed with borax or boric acid.

== See also ==
- Anti-flash white
