= 2007 Asian heat wave =

Heat wave in Asia

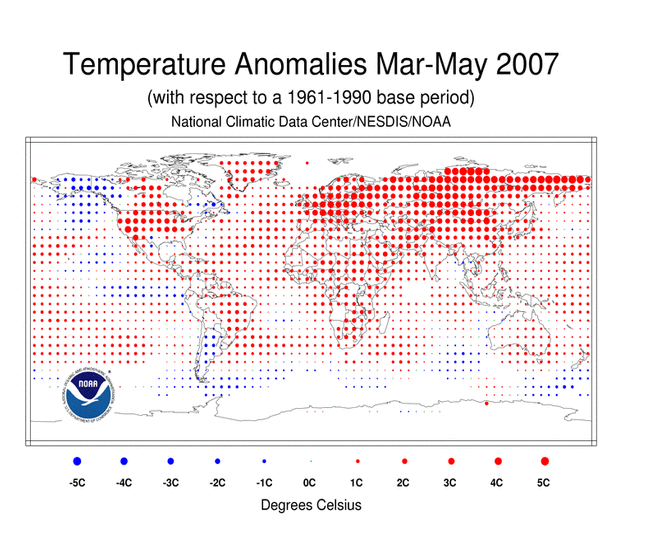
2007 temperature anomalies in March–May, with respect to a 1961–1990 base period.

The 2007 Asian heat wave affected the South Asian countries of India, Pakistan, Bangladesh, and Nepal, as well as Russia, Japan and the People's Republic of China. The heat wave ran during the months of May and June, which continued to September in Japan.

== India ==
Heat-related deaths were reported from the capital New Delhi, northern Haryana, Uttar Pradesh, Rajasthan and Madhya Pradesh. After three days of intense heat with temperatures hovering about 40 °C (104 °F), New Delhi was relieved as the temperature slid down to 37.2 °C (99.0 °F). Meanwhile, the temperature soared to more than 46 °C (115 °F) at several places in northern Madhya Pradesh, with Datia turning out to be the hottest at 48 °C (118 °F).

More than 120 peacocks died in Tughlaqabad Fort and Surajkund due to the heat; additionally, reports of severe water shortages were common. A total of 400 peacocks died in Madhya Pradesh, about 200 of those in Haryana and Punjab alone.

The cotton crop in Punjab was severely affected by the heat wave. Meanwhile, the persisting heat wave in various parts of Chandigarh rendered milk cattle dry. When the day temperature hovered around +48 °C (118 °F), milk supply to various milk plants of cooperative unions went down by 40,000 litres (11,000 US gallons) per day. In addition, milk collection by private-sector plants was reduced by 160,000 litres (42,000 US gallons) during the same period.

== Bangladesh ==
Coming at the end of May, a heat wave left at least 25 people dead. According to hospital sources most victims of the heat were rice farmers working in terraces exposed to the blazing sun for long periods. Nearly 200 people, including several children, were admitted to hospitals with symptoms of heat stroke. According to the meteorological office in Dhaka many northern towns showed day temperatures reaching over +40 °C (104 °F), which is not normal in the Bangladeshi summer. Additionally, there was a high level of humidity.

== Nepal ==
A heat wave affected the livelihood of a large number of poverty-stricken families who depend on day outdoor labour done outdoors, such as constructing roads, driving rickshaws, selling vegetables, making quilts and farming. According to the government's Department of Meteorology the temperature in Nepalganj got up as high as +44 °C (111 °F). It is estimated that at least 11 people died.

== Pakistan ==
The heat wave over Pakistan was claimed to have brought the death toll there up to 192. The meteorological department registered a record maximum temperature of +52 °C (126 °F) in Sibi. Four people died as the temperature in Lahore touched +48 °C (118 °F) on 9 June, which was a record for the previous 78 years.

== Russia ==
The heat waves hit Russia at the end of May. The temperature in Moscow reached +32.9 °C (91.2 °F) on 27 May. The Russian capital had not seen such a sustained heat wave for 128 years. On 28 May an absolute temperature record for May was set, breaking the record of +31.8 °C (89.2 °F) that had been registered back in 1891. The heat also affected agriculture, wiping out about 5,000 km^{2} of spring sown fields.

Animals at Moscow Zoo found it hard to keep cool. Staff had to prevent walruses from bathing in their pool because the water was too warm for them.

== China ==
Beijing opened up its warren of old air raid shelters to help people escape from the heat. The heat also set off explosives at a chemical plant in Shanxi. The explosions injured hundreds of people nearby.

== Japan ==
Most of Japanese cities are highest level of an average temperature, since May to September. According to Meteorological Agency of Japan confirm report, the highest temperature recorded on Celsius 40.9 degrees hitting in Kumagaya, Saitama and Tajimi, Gifu, Celsius 40.3 degrees hitting in Koshigaya, Saitama, on 16 August. And above Celsius 29 degrees of average temperature points are Tokyo, Nagoya, Osaka, Takamatsu, Shikoku. In September, major Japanese cities are recorded to high temperature of Celsius 32 to 37 degrees levels, with highest level of an average temperature in September, since 1868. According to Ministry of Health, Labour and Welfare in Japan confirm report, 923 people died as the result of the heat wave in around Japan, and is considered worst heat stroke disaster of Japanese and North Esat Asia's history.

== See also ==
- Summer 2007
- 2006 European heat wave
- Global warming
