= Bikini variants =

Swimsuits based on or influenced by the bikini

Micheline Bernardini, a nude dancer from the Casino de Paris, wearing the first bikini at the Piscine Molitor (Miller Swimming Pool) in Paris in 1946. Since the bikini was introduced by the fashion designer Louis Réard it has generated a number of variations, often smaller and more revealing than the original.

Many stylistic variations of the bikini have been created. A regular bikini is a two-piece swimsuit that together covers the wearer's crotch, buttocks, and breasts. Some bikini designs cover larger portions of the wearer's body while others provide more minimal coverage, which may be considered desirable for tanning. Topless variants are still sometimes considered bikinis, although they are technically not a two-piece swimsuit.

== Terminology ==
The name bikini was originally used in the 1940s for the skimpy fashion item that first revealed the wearer's navel. However, the current fashion industry considers any two-piece swimsuit to be a bikini. Modern bikini fashions are characterized by a simple, brief design: two triangles of fabric that form a bra and cover the woman's breasts and two triangles of fabric on the bottom forming a panty cut below the navel that cover the groin in front and the buttocks in back. The amount of coverage can vary widely, from a string bikini with very little coverage to a full design with maximum coverage. A topless swimsuit may still be considered a bikini, although naturally it is no longer a two-piece swimsuit.

These derivations of the word bikini were created through inappropriate analogy with words like bilingual, bifocal and bilateral, which contain the Latin prefix "bi-" (meaning "two" in Latin), the word bikini was first back-derived as consisting of two parts, [bi + kini] by Rudi Gernreich when he designed the monokini in 1964. Later swimsuit designs like the tankini and trikini were also named based on the erroneous assumption that the "bi-" in bikini denotes a two-piece swimsuit. These new coinages falsely presumed that the back-formation [bi + kini] was purposeful.

The "-kini family" (as dubbed by author William Safire), including the "-ini sisters" (as dubbed by designer Anne Cole) has grown to include a large number of subsequent variations, often with a hilarious lexicon. Major stylistic variations and an array of spinoff styles include string bikini, monokini or numokini (single, top part missing), tankini (tank top, bikini bottom), camikini (camisole top and bikini bottom), hikini or hipkini, thong, slingshot or sling bikini (actually a one-piece swimsuit), minimini, teardrop, seekini (transparent bikini), microkini and granny bikini (bikini top and boy shorts bottom). In just one major fashion show in 1985, there were two-piece suits with cropped tank tops instead of the usual skimpy bandeaux, suits that are bikinis in front and one-piece behind, suspender straps, ruffles, and daring, navel-baring cutouts.

== Variants ==
=== String bikini ===
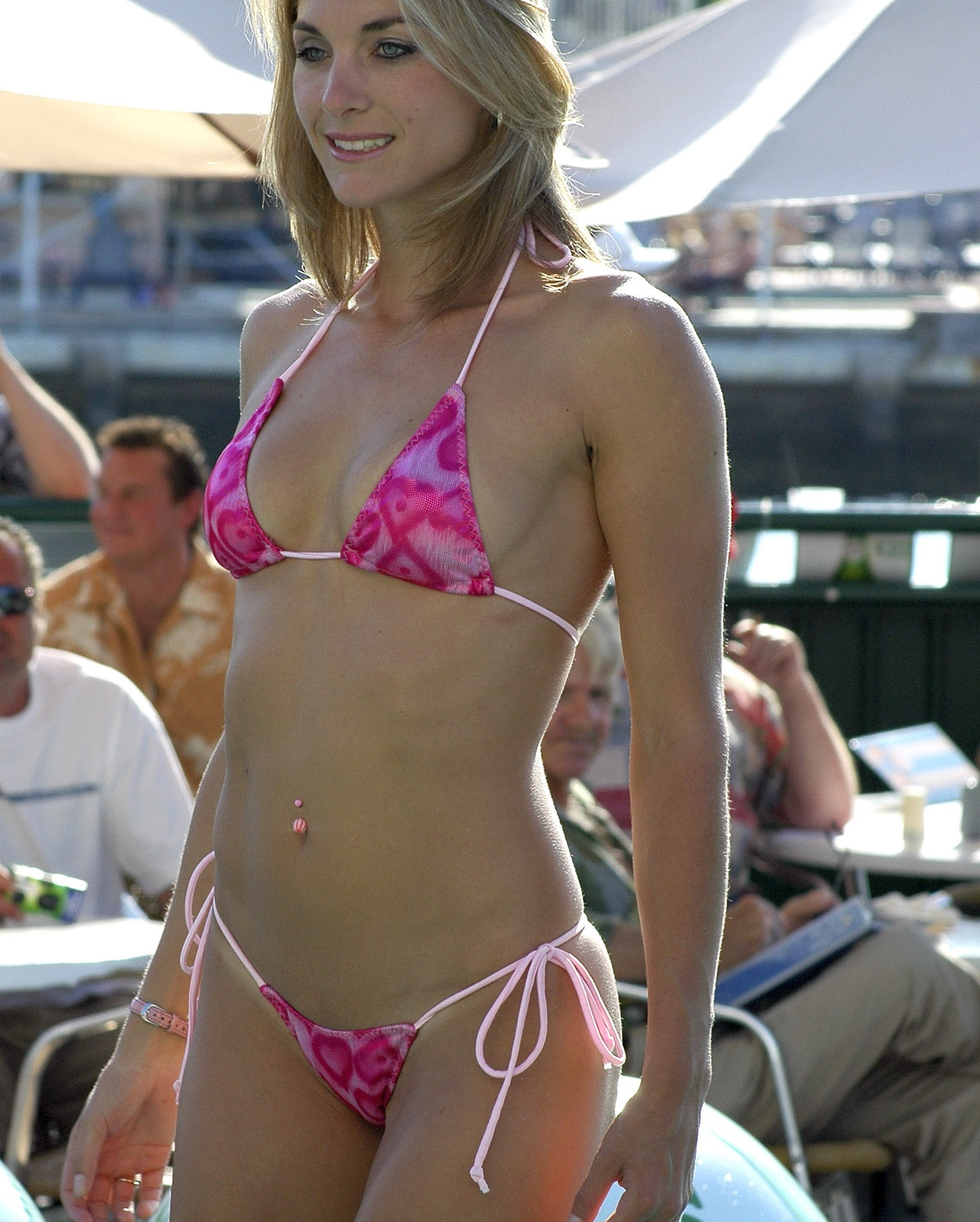
Woman wearing a string bikini in Sunrise, Florida in 2006

A string bikini or stringkini is scantier and more revealing than a regular bikini. It gets its name from the string characteristics of its design. It consists of two triangular shaped pieces connected at the groin but not at the sides, where a thin "string" wraps around the waist connecting the two parts. String bikini tops are similar and are tied in place by the attached "string" pieces. String pieces can either be continuous or tied. A string bikini bottom can have minimal to a maximum coverage of a woman's backside.

The term string bikini first came into use in 1974. There is an urban myth that the Brazilian fashion model Rose di Primo created the first string bikini when she had to sew one with insufficient fabric available to her for a photo shoot. The first formal presentation of string bikini was done by Glen Tortorich, a public relations agent, and his wife Brandi Perret-DuJon, a fashion model, for the opening of Le Petite Centre, a shopping area in the French Quarter of New Orleans, Louisiana in 1974. Inspired by a picture of a Rio de Janeiro fashion model in an issue of Women's Wear Daily, they had local fashion designer Lapin create a string bikini for the event. Models recruited by talent agent Peter Dasigner presented it by removing fur coats by Alberto Lemon on stage. The presentation was covered by local television stations and the New Orleans Times-Picayune newspaper and was sent out via the wire news services of the Associated Press and United Press International.

String bikinis are one of the most popular variations of bikinis. Bikinis are also worn at the hips, but the fabric at the sides is narrower. In the string bikini, it disappears altogether to leave the waistband as a "string". The rear coverage of the bikini is not as full as with the brief. Bikini is the most widely worn style among women worldwide. The tied strings can accidentally come undone leading to a wardrobe malfunction, as happened to Miss Guárico at the Miss Venezuela 2008 beauty pageant.

=== Monokini ===
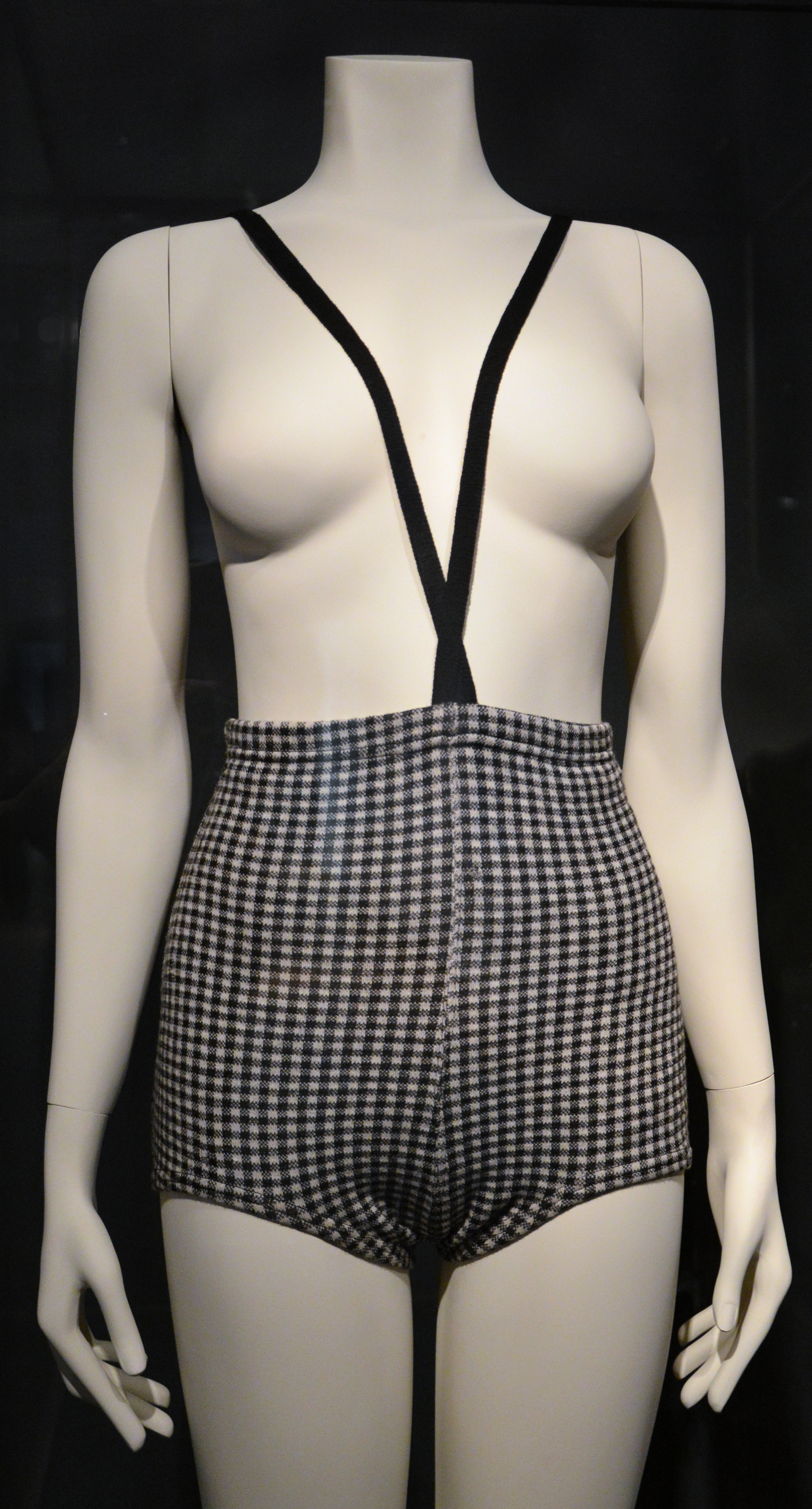
Rudi Gernreich's original 1964 monokini

A monokini, more commonly referred to as a topless swimsuit and sometimes referred to as a unikini, is a women's one-piece swimsuit equivalent to the lower half of a bikini. In 1964, Rudi Gernreich, an Austrian fashion designer, designed the original monokini in the US. Gernreich also invented its name, and the word monokini is first recorded in English that year. Gernreich's monokini looked like a one-piece swimsuit suspended from two halter straps in the cleavage of bared breasts. It had only two small straps over the shoulders, leaving the breasts bare. Despite the reaction of fashion critics and church officials, shoppers purchased the monokini in record numbers that summer, though very few monokinis were ever worn in public. By the end of the season, Gernreich had sold 3000 swimsuits at $24 apiece, which meant a tidy profit for such a minuscule amount of fabric. Monokini usage is uncommon in the US, where Americans have never accepted it for the beach. Many women who wanted to sunbathe topless simply wore the bottom part of a bikini. Manufacturers and retailers quickly adapted to selling tops and bottoms separately. Gernreich later created the lesser known pubikini.

Peggy Moffitt modelled the suit for Gernreich. She said it was a logical evolution of Gernreich's avant-garde ideas in swimwear design as much as a scandalous symbol of the permissive society. In the 1960s, the monokini led the way into the sexual revolution by emphasizing a woman's personal freedom of dress, even when her attire was provocative and exposed more skin than had been the norm during the more conservative 1950s. Like all swimsuits, the monokini bottom portion of the swimsuit can vary in cut. Some have g-string style backs, while others provide full coverage of the rear. The bottom of the monokini may be high cut, reaching to the waist, with high cut legs, or may be a much lower cut, exposing the belly button. The modern monokini, which is less racy than Gernreich's original design, takes its design from the bikini, and is also described as "more of a cut-out one-piece swimsuit", with designers using fabric, mesh, chain, or other materials to link the top and bottom sections together, though the appearance may not be functional, but rather only aesthetic. In recent years, the term has come into use for topless bathing by women: where the bikini has two parts, the monokini is the lower part. Where monokinis are in use, the word bikini may jokingly refer to a two-piece outfit consisting of a monokini and a sun hat. The original monokini is still sold by Victoria's Secret as a half-kini.

=== Microkini ===
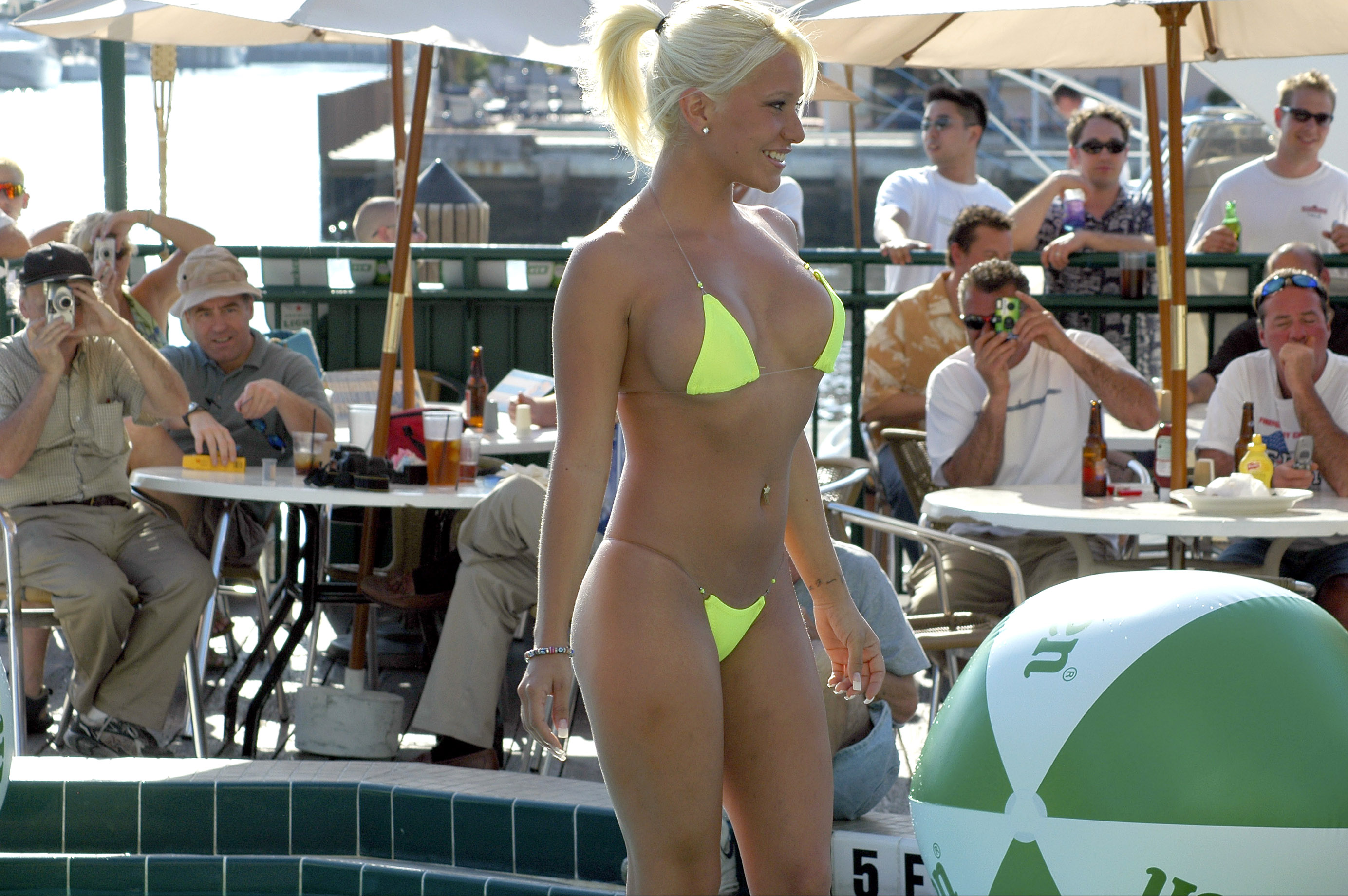
A yellow microkini in Sunrise, Florida in 2006

A microkini (or micro bikini) is an extremely minimalist bikini that uses less fabric than a traditional bikini in order to show more skin and create less visible tan lines. They typically have thong-style bottoms and string straps, covering little more than the nipples and pubic hair. See-through material is sometimes used for the straps to create the illusion that the triangles of fabric are taped to the body. Some variations of the microkini use adhesive or wire to hold the fabric in place over the genitals. These designs do not require any additional side straps to keep the garment in place.

Micro bikini designs for men were introduced at the end of the 1960s consisting of briefs that barely covered the coccyx and the pubic hair. These micro bikinis for men have continued to be popular in Brazil, particularly in Copacabana, Rio de Janeiro. Women's micro bikinis first appeared in the 1970s. During the 1980s the popularity of highly revealing thongs such as those found in the microkini led to a rise in the use of Brazilian waxing to remove most of the hair from the pubic area.

The term "microkini" was first used in 1995 to describe the increasingly small bikini designs that were becoming popular at that time. In the same year fashion designer Karl Lagerfeld created a micro bikini for Chanel's spring 1996 collection. It resembled a string bikini except that the top's triangles were replaced with two small circles resembling nipple pasties. Other fashion brands including GCDS and Dior have since also produced their own versions of the microkini. Celebrities wearing microkinis have included Emily Ratajkowski, Kim Kardashian, Dua Lipa and Bella Hadid.

Microkinis keep the wearer just within legal limits of decency and fill a niche between nudism and conservative swimwear. In Europe the wearing of microkinis at beaches or hotels or public pools is often allowed but it may be considered culturally inappropriate in more conservative societies. Wearing them in public is prohibited in some places by local laws which can carry a fine for infringement.

=== Tankini ===
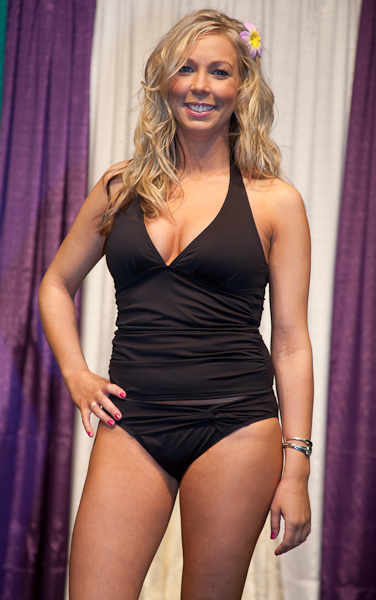
Model wearing a tankini at Run to the Sun Fashion Show in Anchorage, Alaska in 2011

The tankini is a swimsuit combining a tank top, mostly made of spandex-and-cotton or Lycra-and-nylon, and a bikini bottom introduced in the late 1990s. According to author William Safire, "The most recent evolution of the -kini family is the tankini, a cropped tank top supported by spaghetti-like strings." The tankini is distinguished from the classic bikini by the difference in tops, the top of the tankini essentially being a tank top. The tankini top extends downward to somewhere between just above the navel and the top of the hips. The word is a neologism combining the tank of tank top with the end of the word bikini. This go-between nature of tankini has rendered its name to things ranging from a lemonade-based martini (Tankini Martini) to server architecture (Tankini HipThread). This type of swimwear is considered by some to provide modesty closer to that of a one-piece suit but with the convenience of a two-piece suit, such as not needing to remove the entire suit in order to use a lavatory.

Designer Anne Cole, described as a godmother of swimwear in the US, was originator of this style. She scored what would be her biggest hit in 1998 when her label introduced the tankini. A two-piece suit with a top half that covered more of the wearer's torso than a standard bikini top, the suit was an instant hit with customers. Variations of the tankini, made of spandex-and-cotton or Lycra-and-nylon, have been named camkini, with spaghetti straps instead of tank-shaped straps over a bikini bottom, and even bandeaukini, with a bandeau worn as the top. Tankinis come in a variety of styles, colors and shapes, some include features such as integrated push-up bras. It is particularly popular as children's beachwear, and athletic outfit good enough for a triathlon. According to Katherine Betts, Vogue's fashion-news director, this amphibious sportswear for sand or sea lets the user go rafting, playing volleyball and swimming without worrying about losing their top.

=== Trikini ===
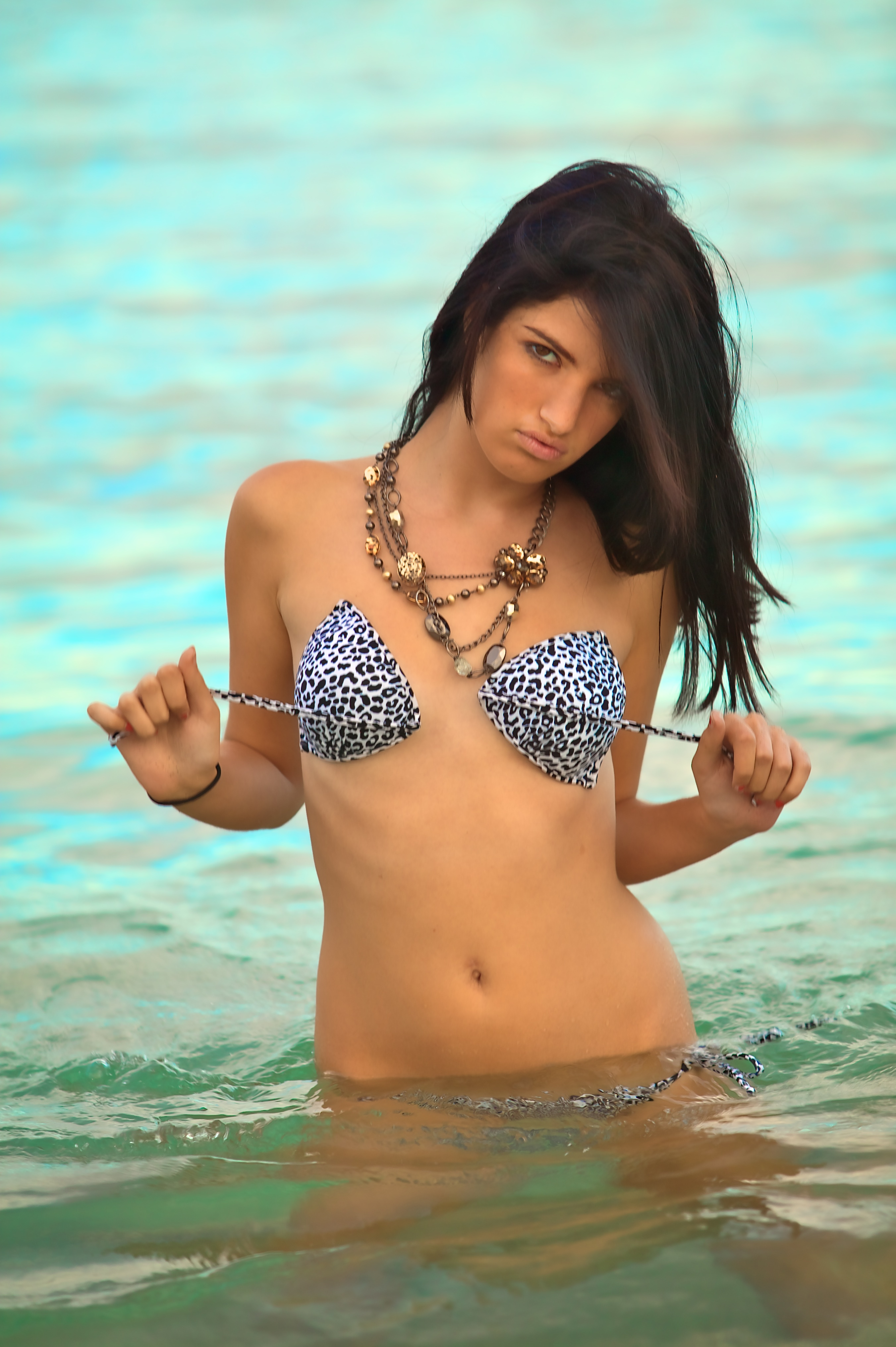
A woman wearing a trikini in 2011

The trikini appeared briefly in 1967, defined as "a handkerchief and two small saucers". It reappeared a few years ago as a bikini bottom with a stringed halter of two triangular pieces of cloth covering the breasts. The trikini top comes essentially in two separate parts. The name of this woman's bathing suit is formed from bikini, replacing "bi-", meaning "two", with "tri-", meaning "three". Writer William Safire wrote in The New York Times: "Stripping to essentials, if the trikini is three pieces, the bikini two and the monokini one, when will we see the zerokini?" Dolce & Gabbana designed trikinis for Summer 2005 as three pieces of scintillating fabric that barely cover the wearer. A variation on the bikini in which three pieces are sold together, such as a bikini with a tank top or a bikini with a one-piece suit is also sometimes called a trikini, including a conventional two-piece with a glitzy band of rhinestones round the waist. Israeli designer Gideon Oberson, known for his artistically inspired bathing suits, produces a trikini that resembles a tank top and can be worn with a skirt or a pair of shorts. Brazilian designer Amir Slama calls two scraps of silk connected with string he designed for skinny women a trikini.

=== Sling bikini ===
The sling bikini is also known as a "suspender bikini", "suspender thong", "slingshot bikini" or just "slingshot". It is a one-piece suit that provides as little or even less coverage (or as much exposure) as a traditional bikini. Usually, a slingshot resembles a bikini bottom, but rather than the straps going around the hips or waist, the side straps extend upwards to cover the breasts and go over the shoulders, leaving the entire sides of the torso uncovered, but the nipples and pubic area covered. Behind the neck, the straps join and reach down the back to become a thong. There is a variation of the sling bikini called the pretzel bikini that has the straps simply encircle the neck and another set of straps pass around the midriff, instead of the straps passing over the neck and down the back. Slingshot bikinis first appeared in the early 1990s at a time when the use of Lycra was increasing. They became popular on the beaches of Europe including Saint-Tropez, Marabella and Ibiza, and in 1994 they were introduced into mainstream US stores.

=== Bandeaukini ===
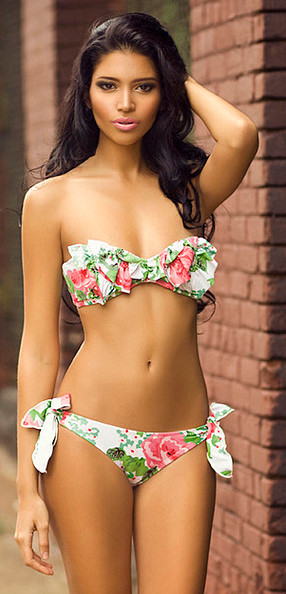
Bandeaukini

A bandeaukini, alternatively called a bandini, bandkini or bandikini, is a bandeau top, with no straps going over the shoulders, worn with any bikini bottom. The appeal of the bandeau grew fast among young women, with bandeau tops edging into the sales of the classic tankini. Sometimes the same design has been called a bandeaukini and a tankini.

A bandeau may be fastened in the front or back or be sufficiently elastic so as not to need a fastener at all. A bandeau may come with a detachable halter strap, for extra support. A strapless bandeau, or tube top, was also worn as casual wear and sports wear starting in the 1970s, and is sometimes worn as part of a sportswear ensemble. Actress Halle Berry wore a skimpy pink bikini top with matching pants to the 2000 MTV Movie Awards, fueling the trend of wearing a bandeau top as an out-of-home dress.

=== Skirtini ===
A woman in a skirtini

The skirtini, a portmanteau of skirt and bikini, which features a bikini top and a small, skirted bottom, is an innovation for bikini-style clothes with more coverage. In 2007, skirtinis by Juicy Couture were dubbed as one of the top new trends. In 2011, The Daily Telegraph identified the skirted bikini as one of the top 10 swimwear design of the season.

According to Anne-Marie Blondeau, marketing and communications coordinator for swimwear company Maillot Baltex, "There was a lot of swimsuits that looked like dresses and skirts, so when you think about skirtinis in that sense, yes it seems old... but the skirtini is a bit shorter than the average skirt." Pre-bikini two piece beachwear used aprons, skirts or draped panels to conceal "private areas". Two-piece swimsuits with usual skirt panels were popular in the US before the government ordered a 10% reduction in fabric used in woman's swimwear in 1943 as wartime rationing. Playsuits were a beachwear popular in the 1950s that featured a "modesty skirt" and a bandeau top.

== Styles ==
In one major fashion show in 1985 were two-piece suits with cropped tank tops instead of the usual skimpy bandeaux, suits that are bikinis in front and one-piece in back, suspender straps, ruffles, and daring, navel-baring cutouts. Subsequent variations on the theme include the monokini, tankini, string bikini, thong, slingshot, minimini, teardrop, and micro.

To meet fast-changing tastes, in 1991 some manufacturers offered made-to-order bikinis produced in around seven minutes.

=== Bikini tops ===
Bikini tops come in several different styles and cuts, including a halter-style neck that offers more coverage and support, a strapless bandeau, a rectangular strip of fabric covering the breasts that minimizes large breasts, a top with cups similar to a push-up bra, and the more traditional triangle cups that lift and shape the breasts.

There are four fundamental types of bare-midriff bikini tops: the brassière, halter, bandeau, and vest. These styles are differentiated by the number of shoulder straps and the resultant number of edges to the garment. Some of these tops include a halter-style neck strap that offers more coverage and support, a strapless bandeau, a rectangular strip of fabric covering the breasts that minimizes large breasts, a top with cups similar to a push-up bra, and the more traditional triangle cups that lift and shape the breasts.

=== Bikini bottoms ===
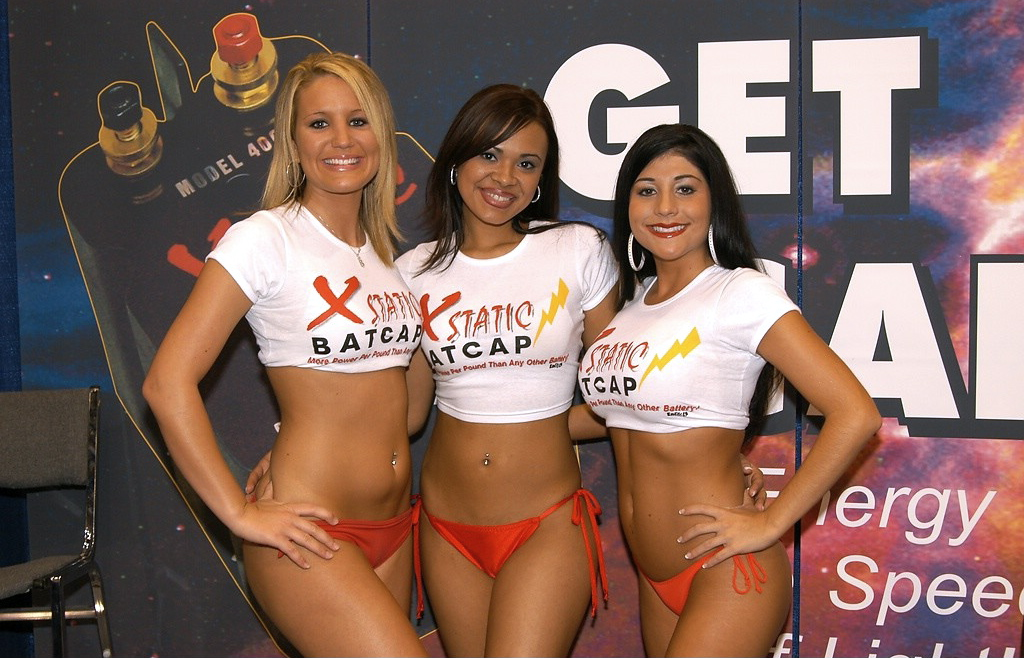
Wearing crop-tops and bikini bottoms.

The website Bikini Science identifies 30 different types of bikini bottoms that vary in style, cut and the amount of rear coverage they offer. The coverage ranges from full, as in the case of more modest bottom pieces like briefs, shorts, or briefs with a small skirt-panel attached, to full buttock exposure, as in the case of the thong bikini. Skimpier styles have narrow sides, including V-cut (in front), French cut (with high-cut sides) and low-cut string (with string sides).

== Materials ==
High-tech bikinis

- Continuum Fashion and 3D printers Shapeways created the world's first 3D printed bikini called N12 (short form for Nylon 12) in 2011 using Rhino 3D CAD software along with an algorithm written by 3D modeling expert Jenna Fizel.
- New York inventor Andrew Schneider invented a solar bikini in 2011 covering it with 40 flexible photovoltaic cells feeding into a USB connection that can plug straight into an iPod. Two hours of sunbathing is claimed to be enough to charge an iPod Shuffle.
- In 2003, chemical company BASF embedded nanoparticles of titanium dioxide into a nylon fabric, which was used for a prototype sun-protective bikini that maintained its UV protection when wet.
- French designer John Nouanesing created the Geekini in 2008, incorporating NES game controls into a bikini.
- Canadian swimwear makers Solestrom introduced two different types of UV indicator in its Smartswim bikinis in 2008 – photochromatic beads that darken with increased UV levels and an integrated LED display.
- First2Print, a digital fabric printing pioneer, collaborated with ESPI Fashion Design in 2005, to create the first digitally printed bikini that allowed exclusive artwork to be transferred onto bikinis. Houston based bikini manufacturer Relleciga started mass marketing digitally printed bikinis in 2013.
- Amateur inventor Jill Silver introduced a backless and strapless bikini, named the Demikini, that used a gel under the arm to fix the top.
- Cole of California introduced in 1992 an inflatable bikini with push-up pads that worked like air-pump shoes.
- First introduced in 1969, "tan-through swimwear" uses fabric perforated with thousands of micro holes that are nearly invisible to the naked eye, but which let enough sunlight through to produce a line-free tan.

Bikinis have been made out of just about every material used in fashion. The fabrics and other materials used to make bikinis are an essential element of their style and crucial modifiers of swimsuit design. The use of cotton made the swimsuit more practical, and the increased reliance on stretch fabric after 1960 simplified construction; alternative swimwear fabrics such as velvet, leather, and crocheted squares surfaced in the early 1970s. Crochet, lace, PVC, raffia, fur, latex, velvet and other uncommon items are also used as bikini material.

Fashion adviser Malia Mills has two basic criteria to check the material—it does not wrinkle into a bundle at the back, and nothing "falls out" when picking a towel or raising the arms. For the female bodybuilder, the material regulations are more stringent, as "the two pieces of the bikini are fastened together with two strings, and the fasteners as all as the bikini must not consist of metallic material or padding".

=== Cotton ===
Modern bikinis were first made of cotton and jersey. Today bikinis are made with mostly made with treated fabric, having been stretched over a plastic mold, then baked in order to set its shape and create bikini brassieres. They are usually lined with fabric which is designed to stop them becoming transparent when wet. The use of cotton made the swimsuit more practical, and the increased reliance on stretch fabric after 1960 simplified construction. Alternative swimwear fabrics such as velvet, leather, and crocheted squares surfaced in the early 1970s.

=== Nylon ===
The stretch nylon bikini briefs and bras which complemented the adolescent boutique fashions of the 1960s also allowed those to be minimal. Women on the beaches of Rio de Janeiro and Saint-Tropez went even further, forgoing all rear-view coverage to show off their thongs.

=== Spandex ===
When DuPont introduced Lycra (DuPont's brand name for spandex) in the 1960s, a stretch fibre that allowed them to stitch tinier pieces of fabric, it changed how suits were designed and who could wear them. Spandex expanded the range of novelty fabrics available to designers which meant suits could be made to fit like a second skin without heavy linings streamlined athletic styles, emphasizing high-tech fabrics and finishes. "The advent of Lycra allowed more women to wear a bikini," wrote Kelly Killoren Bensimon, a former model and author of The Bikini Book, "It didn't sag, it didn't bag, and it concealed and revealed. It wasn't so much like lingerie anymore." It allowed designers to create the string bikini, and allowed Rudi Gernreich to create the topless monokini.

Retailer Marks & Spencer reintroduced spandex as an alternative to nylon in swimsuits in the 1960s. While spandex is used in most swimsuits designs because of its high elasticity, lower expense, and water wicking nature, its major drawback is that it breaks down in chlorine, commonly found in swimming pools. When worn daily, a swimsuit made of spandex will break down in about 2–3 months. Speedo introduced Fastskin in 2007 as the lightest and fastest material for competitive swimwear. Unlike spandex, it does not break down in chlorine.

=== Uncommon materials ===
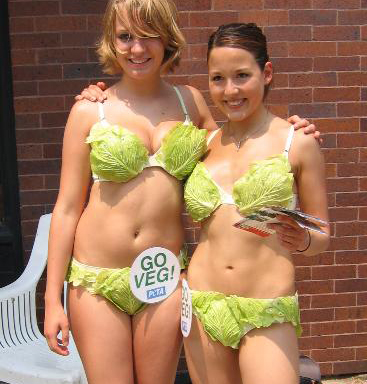
"Vegetable Bikini" as part of a PETA campaign in the Short North, Columbus, Ohio in 2005

Bikinis have been made out of just about every material known. UK actress Diana Dors wore a mink bikini designed by Julie Harris at the Cannes Film Festival to become an instant sensation. In 1967, a bikini made of paper was introduced in France, which disintegrated when in water. Italian sportswear designer Emilio Pucci produced bikinis in soft silk jersey in his signature style. Norma Kamali's innovative designs utilized gold Lurex for a shiny sexy swimsuit.

Rio de Janeiro designer Triya created a rigid metal bandeau top that looked a cast of the model's chest. Designer Laura Jane created bikinis made of neoprene, the rubber-like material used to make wetsuits, in 1989. Fernando Garcia, a bikini designer in South Beach, Miami, turns various exotic material into bikinis including blacklight paint, python skin, Mongolian sheepskin fringe and black fox material.

PETA used "Lettuce Bikinis" to promote vegetarianism in 2010. Apart from storming streets with women wearing bikinis made of faux lettuce, the activist organization had a number of celebrities to be their "Lettuce Ladies" including Pamela Anderson, Elizabeth Berkley, Jayde Nicole, Alicia Mayer, Courtney Stodden and others. Pop star Lady Gaga wore a "meat bikini" (not to be confused with the meat dress), for the cover of Vogue, which was criticized by PETA.

=== Eco-friendly material ===
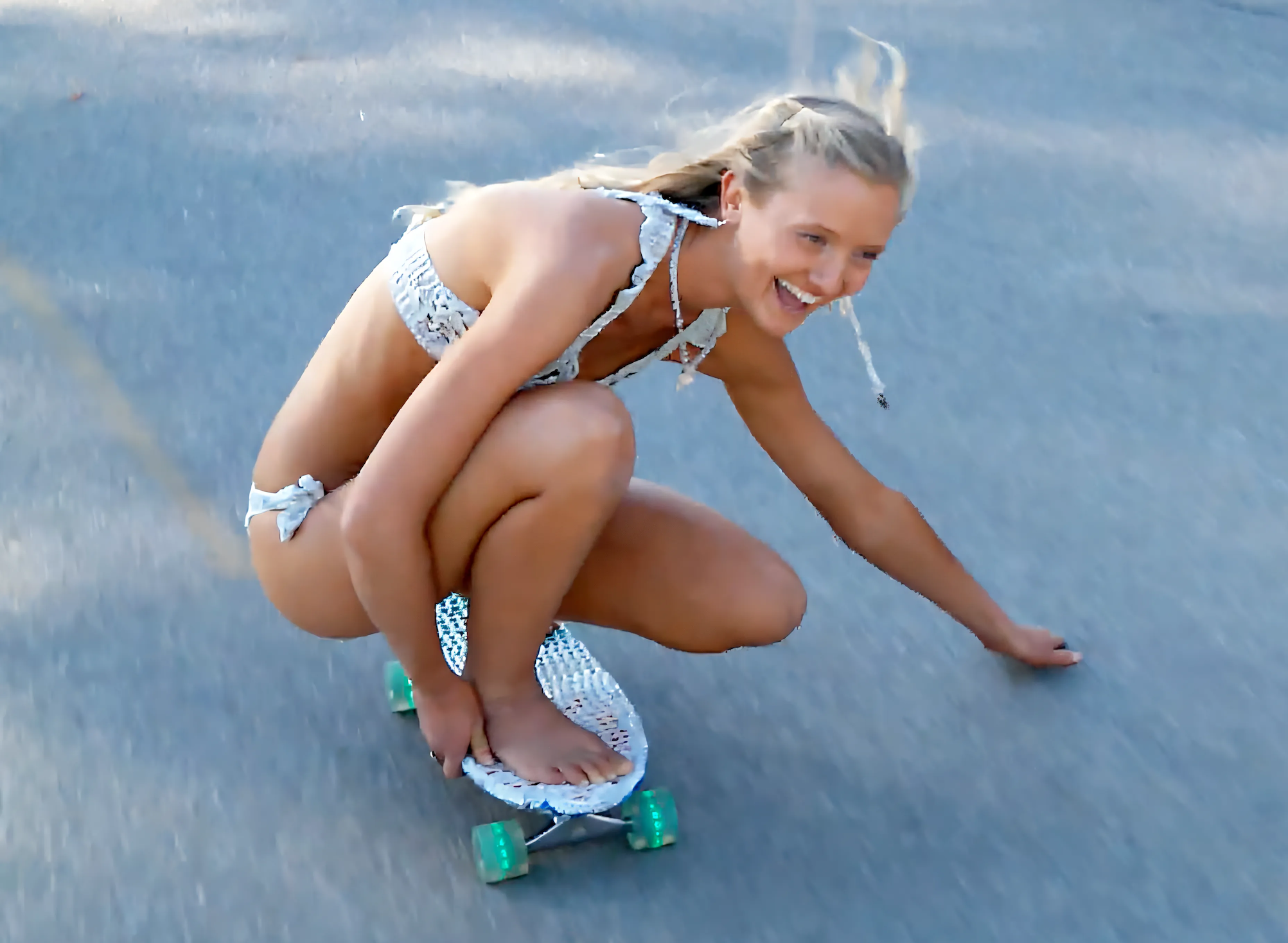
Sarah Bellum in 2015 riding her cruiser skateboard in an upcycled plastic bag bikini. The plastic bag-style bikini was created in a bid to reduce plastic waste in the oceans.

By the 2010s, a number of manufacturers came up with environmentally-friendly bikinis that used organic cotton, organic bamboo fibres, fabric remnants, post-consumer plastic including water bottles, discarded fishnet, recycled nylon, even soy (all of which used eco-friendly dyes). Inventor Claudia Escobar made bikinis out of tanned and dyed salmon skin in 2003 which earned a Green Seal of approval for sustainable products.

=== Precious metal and jewels ===
A platinum bikini valued at US$9500 was made by Mappin and Webb of London in 1977, and was worn by Miss United Kingdom in that year's Miss World beauty pageant. It was entered as a Guinness World Record for the most expensive bikini. A more expensive but exclusive bikini was designed in February 2006 by Susan Rosen. The bikini, made up of over 150 carats (30 g) of flawless diamonds, was worth an estimated £20 million. Pistol Panties, a label favored by celebrities like Victoria Beckham and Kate Moss, introduced a UK£2,000 bikini in 2009. Unsuitable for swimming, it was covered with 5,000 Swarovski crystals.

== Pattern ==
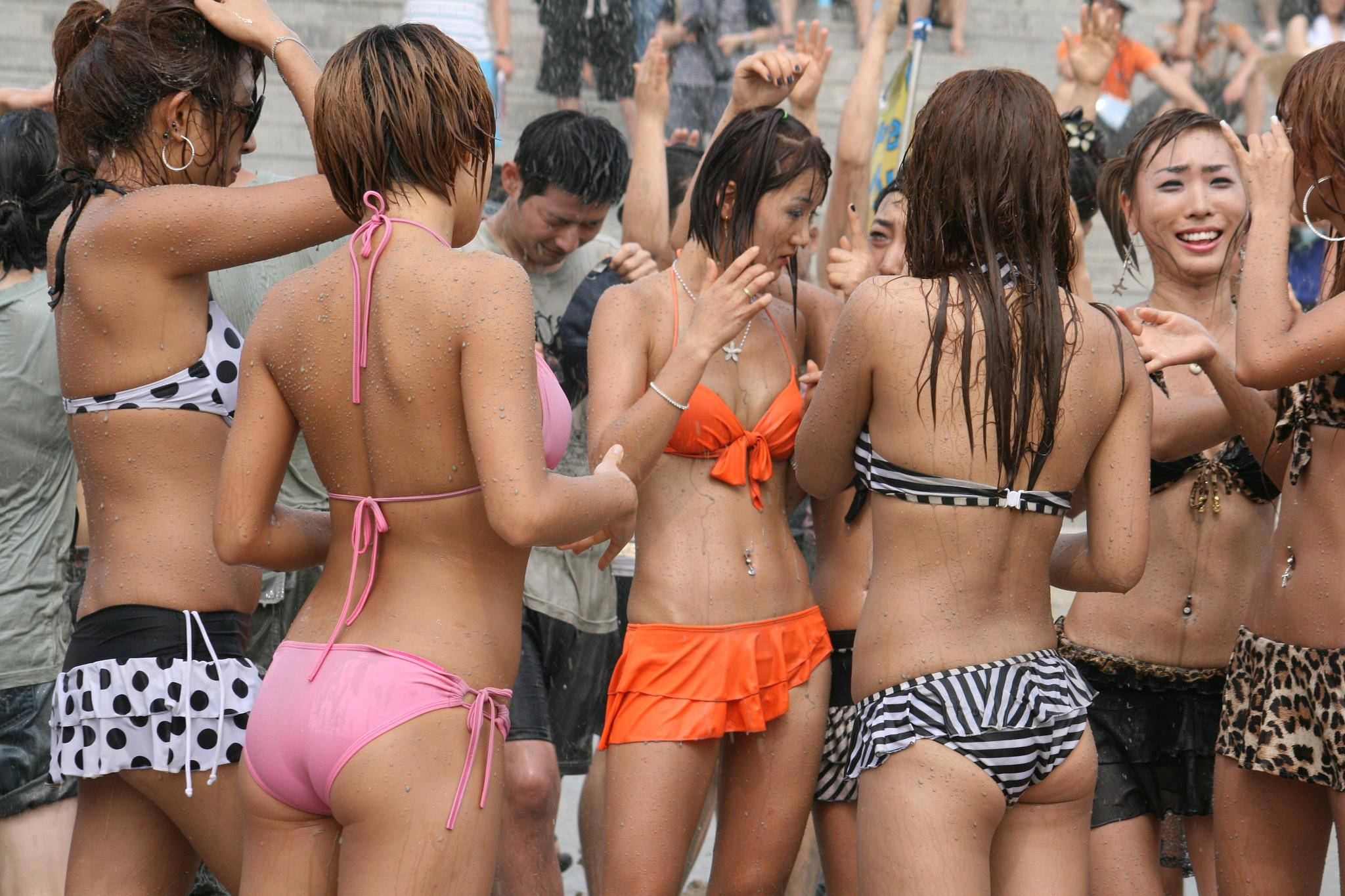
Bikinis come in a variety of patterns, including stripes, polka dots, and animal print at the Mud Festival in Boryeong, South Korea in 2008

Bikini precursors and the first modern bikinis were made of cotton and jersey and were mostly striped or monochrome. Réard introduced the first printed material for bikini. By the 1970s, when American women began to adopt European styles, bikini variants started to diversify widely. Flower patterns became popular in the late 1960s. Designers like Tom Brigance at Lord & Taylor department store cut his swimwear from colorful cottons in stripes, large prints, and polka dots to give early bikinis a more tailored look.

== See also ==
- Bikini waxing
- Burqini
- Facekini
- History of the bikini
- Bikini in popular culture
