= History of the bikini =

History of two-piece swimwear

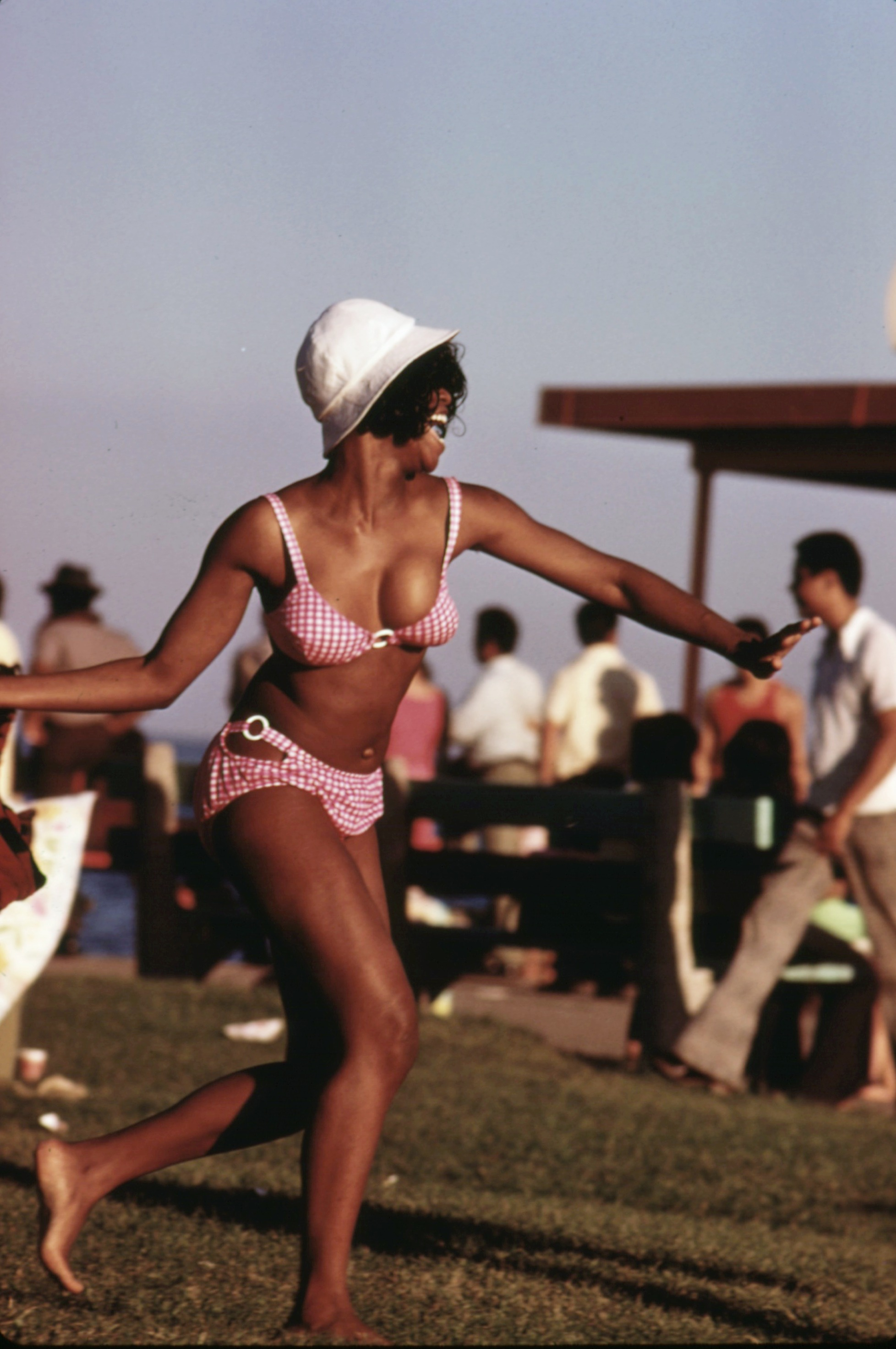
Woman wearing bikini in Chicago (1973)

Evidence of bikini-style women's clothing has been found as early as 5600 BC, and the history of the bikini can be traced back to that era. Illustrations of women wearing bikini-like garments during competitive athletic events in the Roman era have been found in several locations, the most famous of which is at Villa Romana del Casale.

Although two-piece bathing suits were being used by women as early as the 1930s, the modern bikini is dated to July 5, 1946, when, partly due to material rationing after World War II, French engineer Louis Réard introduced the modern bikini, modeled by Micheline Bernardini. Réard named his design after the Bikini Atoll, where the first post-war tests of the atomic bomb were taking place.

French women welcomed the design but the Catholic Church, some media, and a majority of the public initially thought the design was risqué or even scandalous. Contestants in the first Miss World beauty pageant wore them in 1951, but the bikini was then banned from the competition. Actress Brigitte Bardot drew attention when she was photographed wearing a bikini on the beach during the Cannes Film Festival in 1953. Other actresses, including Rita Hayworth and Ava Gardner, also received press attention when they wore bikinis. During the early 1960s, the design appeared on the cover of Playboy and Sports Illustrated, credited with giving it additional legitimacy. Ursula Andress made a huge impact when she emerged from the surf wearing what is now an iconic bikini in the James Bond movie Dr. No (1962). The deer skin bikini worn by Raquel Welch in the film One Million Years B.C. (1966) turned her into an international sex symbol and was described as a definitive look of the 1960s.

The bikini gradually grew to gain wide acceptance in the Western world. According to French fashion historian Olivier Saillard, the bikini is perhaps the most popular type of female beachwear around the globe because of "the power of women, and not the power of fashion". As he explains, "The emancipation of swimwear has always been linked to the emancipation of women." By the early 2000s, bikinis had become a US$811 million business annually, and boosted spin-off services like bikini waxing and sun tanning.

== In antiquity ==
=== Pre-Roman ===
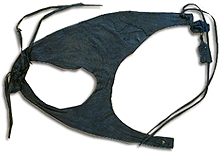
Leather thong bottom from the time of Roman Britain

In the Chalcolithic era of around 5600 BC, the mother-goddess of Çatalhöyük, a large ancient settlement in southern Anatolia, was depicted astride two leopards while wearing a bikini-like costume. Two-piece garments worn by women for athletic purposes are depicted on Greek urns and paintings dating back to 1400 BC. Active women of ancient Greece wore a breastband called a mastodeton or an apodesmos, which continued to be used as an undergarment in the Middle Ages. While men in ancient Greece abandoned the perizoma, partly high-cut briefs and partly loincloth, women performers and acrobats continued to wear it.

=== Roman ===
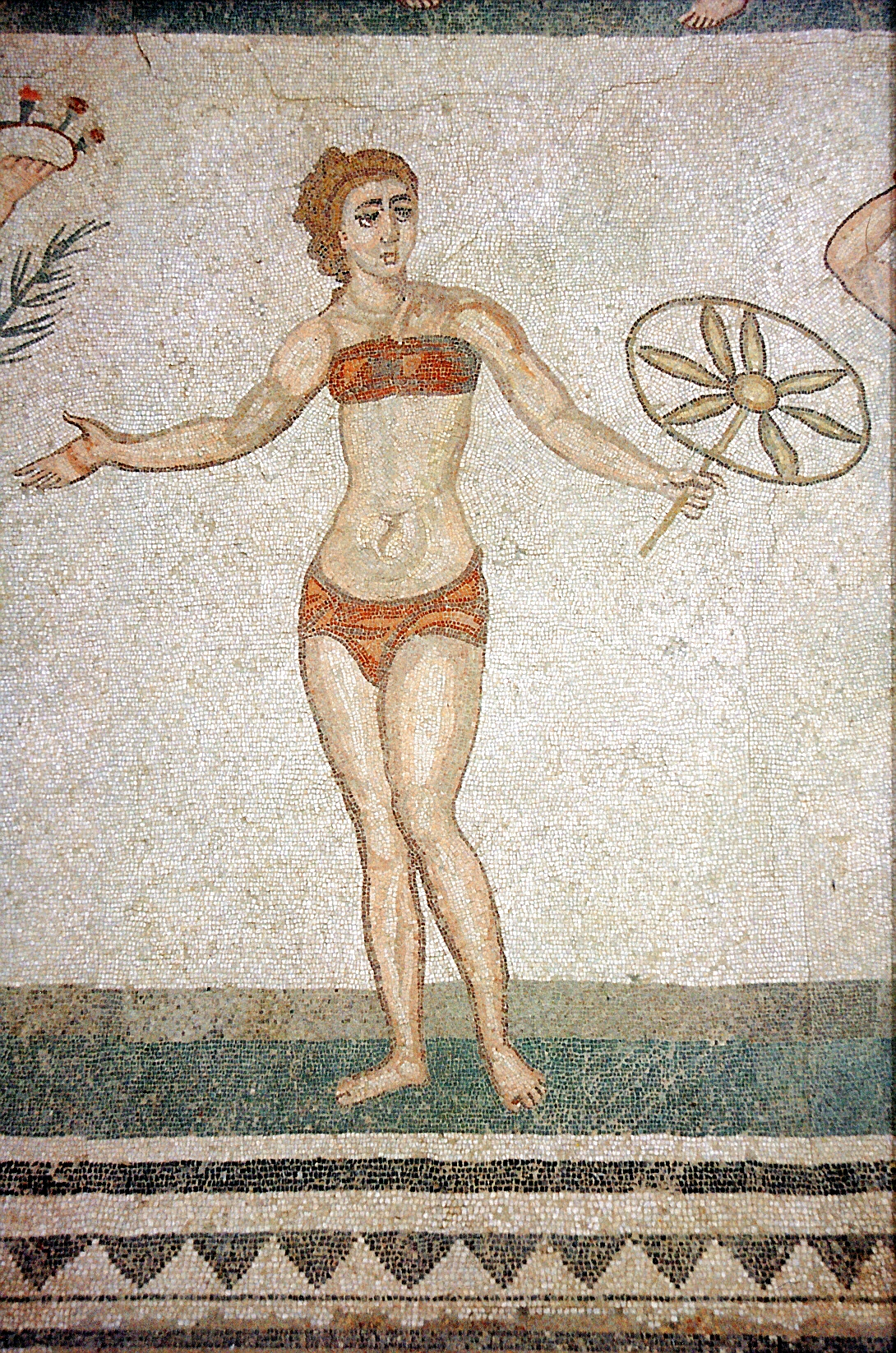
One of the earliest known images of a bikini, from the Ancient Roman Villa Romana del Casale

Artwork dating back to the Diocletian period (286–305 AD) in Villa Romana del Casale, Sicily, excavated by Gino Vinicio Gentili in 1950–60, depicts women in garments resembling bikinis in mosaics on the floor. The images of ten women, dubbed the "Bikini Girls", exercising in clothing that would pass as bikinis today, are the most replicated mosaic among the 37 million colored tiles at the site. In the artwork "Coronation of the Winner" done in floor mosaic in the Chamber of the Ten Maidens (Sala delle Dieci Ragazze in Italian) the bikini girls are depicted weight-lifting, discus throwing, and running. Some activities depicted have been described as dancing, as their bodies resemble dancers rather than athletes. Coronation in the title of the mosaic comes from a woman in a toga with a crown in her hand and one of the maidens holding a palm frond.

Some academics maintain that the nearby image of Eros, the primordial god of lust, love, and intercourse, was added later, demonstrating the owner's predilections and strengthening the association of the bikini with the erotic. Similar mosaics have been discovered in Tellaro in northern Italy and Patti, another part of Sicily.

Prostitution, skimpy clothes and athletic bodies were related in ancient Rome, as images were found of female sex workers exercising with dumbbells/clappers and other equipment wearing costumes similar to the Bikini Girls.

Charles Seltman, a fellow of Queens' College, Cambridge, curator of the Archaeology Museum there and an editor of The Cambridge Ancient History, illustrated a chapter titled "The new woman" in his book Women in Antiquity with a 1950s model wearing an identical bikini against the 4th-century mosaics from Piazza Armerina as part of a sisterhood between the bikini-clad female athletes of ancient Greco-Romans and modern woman. A photograph of the mosaic was used by Sarah Pomeroy, Professor of Classics at Hunter College and the Graduate Center, City University of New York, in the 1994 British edition of her book Goddesses, Whores, Wives, and Slaves to emphasize a similar identification. According to archeologist George M.A. Hanfmann the bikini girls made the learned observers realize "how modern the ancients were".

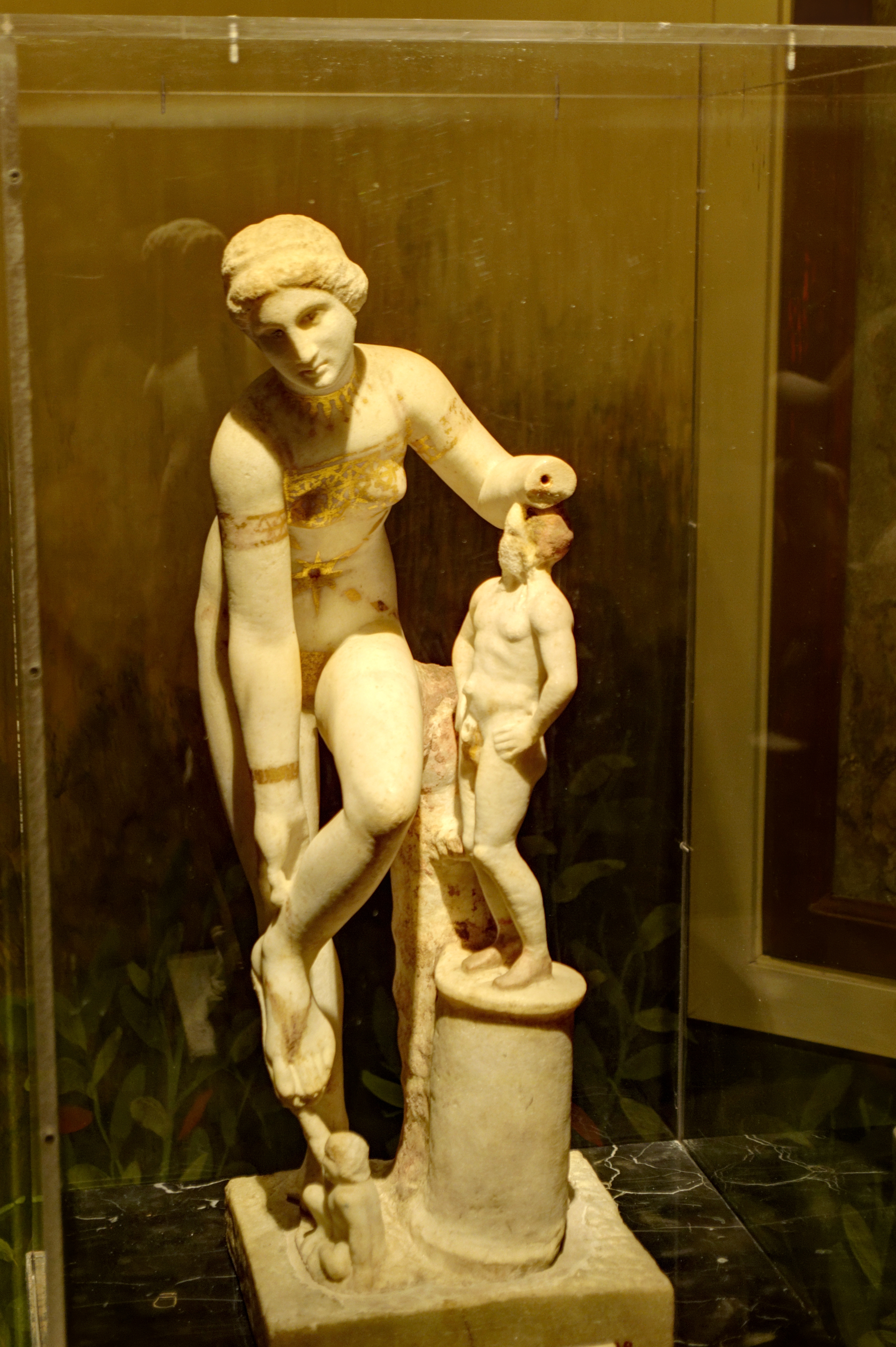
The "Venus in a bikini" from the house of Julia Felix in Pompeii is actually Venus' Greek counterpart Aphrodite ready to untie her sandal, leaning on Priapus with Eros under her foot; 1st-century AD

In ancient Rome, the bikini-style bottom, a wrapped loincloth of cloth or leather, was called a subligar or subligaculum ("little binding underneath"), while a band of cloth or leather to support the breasts was called strophium or mamillare. The exercising bikini girls from Piazza Armerina wear subligaria, scanty briefs made as a dainty version of a man's perizoma, and a strophium band about the breasts, often referred to in literature as just fascia, which can mean any kind of bandage. Observation of artifacts and experiments shows bands had to be wrapped several times around the breasts, largely to flatten them in a style popular with flappers in the 1920s. These Greco-Roman breastbands may have flattened big breasts and padded small breasts to look bigger. Evidence suggests regular use.

The "bikini girls" from Piazza Armerina, some of whom sport a braless look, do not depict any propensity of such popularity in style. A number of bottoms, made of leather, have been excavated in London and Mainz. There has been no evidence that these bikinis were for swimming or sun-bathing.

Finds especially in Pompeii show the Roman goddess Venus wearing a bikini. A statue of the Venus in a bikini was found in a cupboard in the southwest corner in Casa della Venere, others were found in the front hall. A statue of the Venus was recovered from the tablinum of the house of Julia Felix, and another from an atrium in the garden at Via Dell'Abbondanza. Naples National Archaeological Museum, which opened its limited viewing gallery of more explicit exhibits in 2000, also exhibits a "Venus in Bikini". However, the Naples National Archaeological Museum is keen to stress that this statue actually depicts her Greek counterpart Aphrodite as she is about to untie her sandal, a common theme among other works depicting Aphrodite. The Naples National Archaeological Museum's exhibits include female statues wearing see-through gold lamé brassiere, basque and knickers.

The Kings of Naples discovered these Pompeii artifacts, including the one meter tall, almost unclothed statue of Venus painted in gold leaf with something like a modern bikini. They found them so shocking that for long periods the secret chamber was opened only to "mature persons of secure morals". Even after the doors were opened, only 20 visitors were to be admitted at a time, and children under 12 were not allowed into the new part of the museum without their parents' or a teacher's permission.

There are references to bikinis in ancient literature as well. Ovid, the writer ranked alongside Virgil and Horace as one of the three canonical poets of Latin literature, suggests the breastband or long strip of cloth wrapped around the breasts and tucked in the ends, is a good place to hide love-letters. Martial, a Latin poet from Hispania who published between AD 86 and 103, satirized a female athlete he named Philaenis, who played ball in a bikini-like garb quite bluntly, making her drink, gorge and vomit in abundance and hinting at her lesbianism. In an epigram on Chione, Martial strangely mentions a sex worker who went to the bathhouse in a bikini, while it was more natural to go unclothed. Reportedly Theodora, the 6th century empress of the Byzantine Empire wore a bikini when she appeared as an actress before she captured the heart of emperor Justinian I.

There is evidence of ancient Roman women playing expulsim ludere, an early version of handball, wearing costumes that have been identified as bikinis.

== Interval ==
Between the classical bikinis and the modern bikini there has been a long interval. Swimming or outdoor bathing were discouraged in the Christian West and there was little need for a bathing or swimming costume until the 18th century. The bathing gown in the 18th century was a loose ankle-length full-sleeve chemise-type gown made of wool or flannel, so that modesty or decency was not threatened. In the first half of the 19th century the top became knee-length while an ankle-length drawer was added as a bottom. By the second half of the 19th century, in France, the sleeves started to vanish, the bottom became shorter to reach only the knees and the top became hip-length and both became more form fitting. In the 1900s women wore wool dresses on the beach that were made of up to 9 yards (8.2 m) of fabric. That standard of swimwear evolved into the modern bikini in the first of half of the 20th century.

=== Breakthrough ===
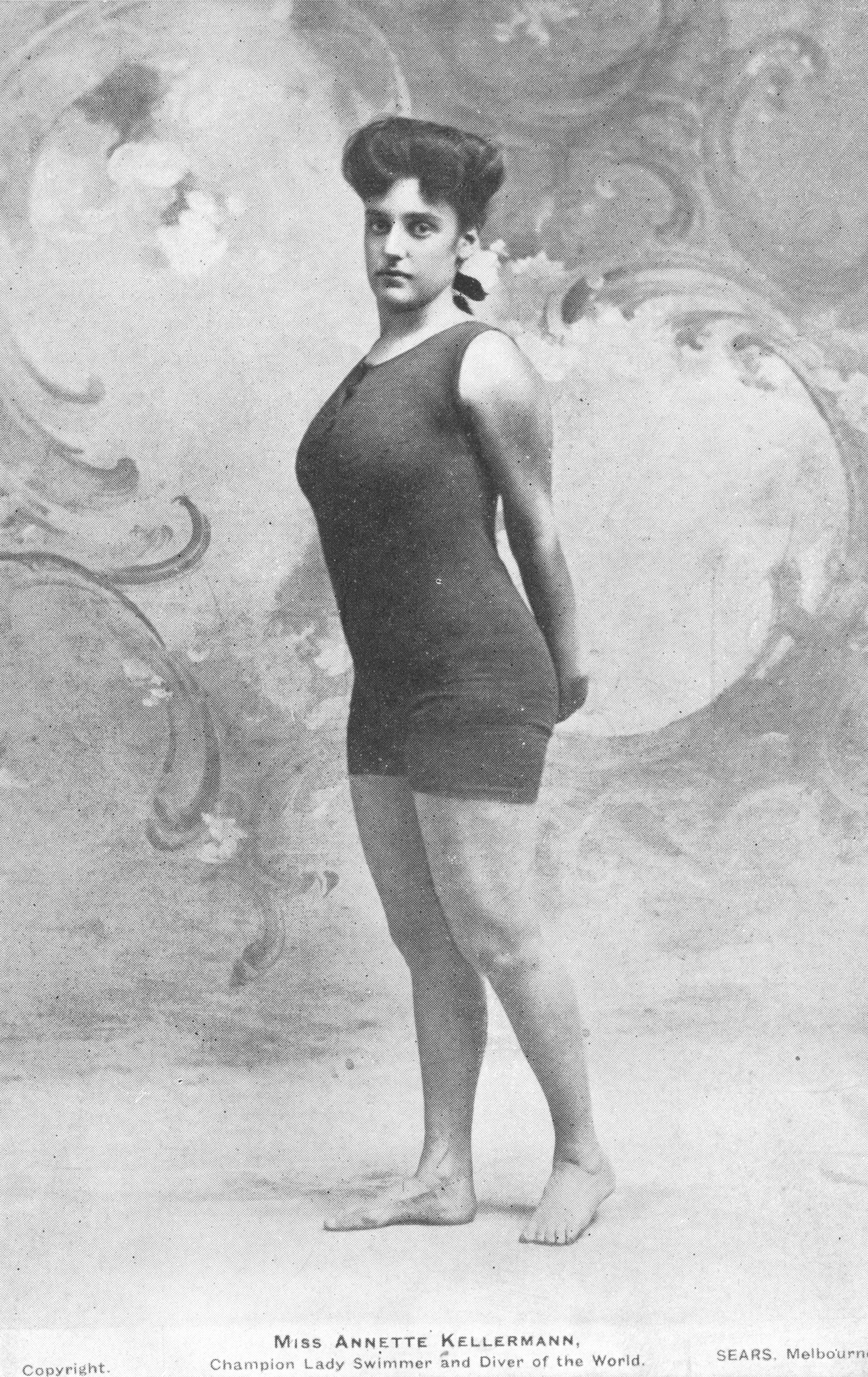
Annette Kellerman in a self-designed form-fitting one-piece tank suit, c. 1910s.

In 1907, Australian swimmer and performer Annette Kellerman was arrested on a Boston beach for wearing a form-fitting sleeveless one-piece knitted swimming tights that covered her from neck to toe, a costume she adopted from England, although it became accepted swimsuit attire for women in parts of Europe by 1910. Even in 1943, pictures of the Kellerman swimsuit were produced as evidence of indecency in Esquire v. Walker, Postmaster General. But, Harper's Bazaar wrote in June 1920 (vol. 55, no. 6, p. 138) – "Annette Kellerman Bathing Attire is distinguished by an incomparable, daring beauty of fit that always remains refined." The following year, in June 1921 (vol. 54, no. 2504, p. 101) it wrote that these bathing suits were "famous ... for their perfect fit and exquisite, plastic beauty of line."

Female swimming was introduced at the 1912 Summer Olympics. In 1913, inspired by that breakthrough, the designer Carl Jantzen made the first functional two-piece swimwear, a close-fitting one-piece with shorts on the bottom and short sleeves on top. Silent films such as The Water Nymph (1912) saw Mabel Normand in revealing attire, and this was followed by the daringly dressed Sennett Bathing Beauties (1915–1929). The word "swimsuit" was coined in 1915 by Jantzen Knitting Mills, a sweater manufacturer who launched the Red Diving Girl swimwear brand. The first annual bathing suit day at New York's Madison Square Garden in 1916 was a landmark. The swimsuit apron, a design for early swimwear, disappeared by 1918, leaving a tunic covering the shorts.

During the 1920s and 1930s, people began to shift from "taking in the water" to "taking in the sun" at bathhouses and spas, and swimsuit designs shifted from functional considerations to incorporate more decorative features. Rayon was used in the 1920s in the manufacture of tight-fitting swimsuits, but its durability, especially when wet, proved problematic, with jersey and silk also sometimes being used. Burlesque and vaudeville performers wore two-piece outfits in the 1920s. The 1929 film Man with a Movie Camera shows Russian women wearing early two-piece swimsuits which expose their midriff, and a few who are topless. Films of holidaymakers in Germany in the 1930s show women wearing two-piece suits. Actress Dolores del Río was the first major star to wear a two-piece women's bathing suit onscreen in Flying Down to Rio (1933).

=== Necklines and midriff ===
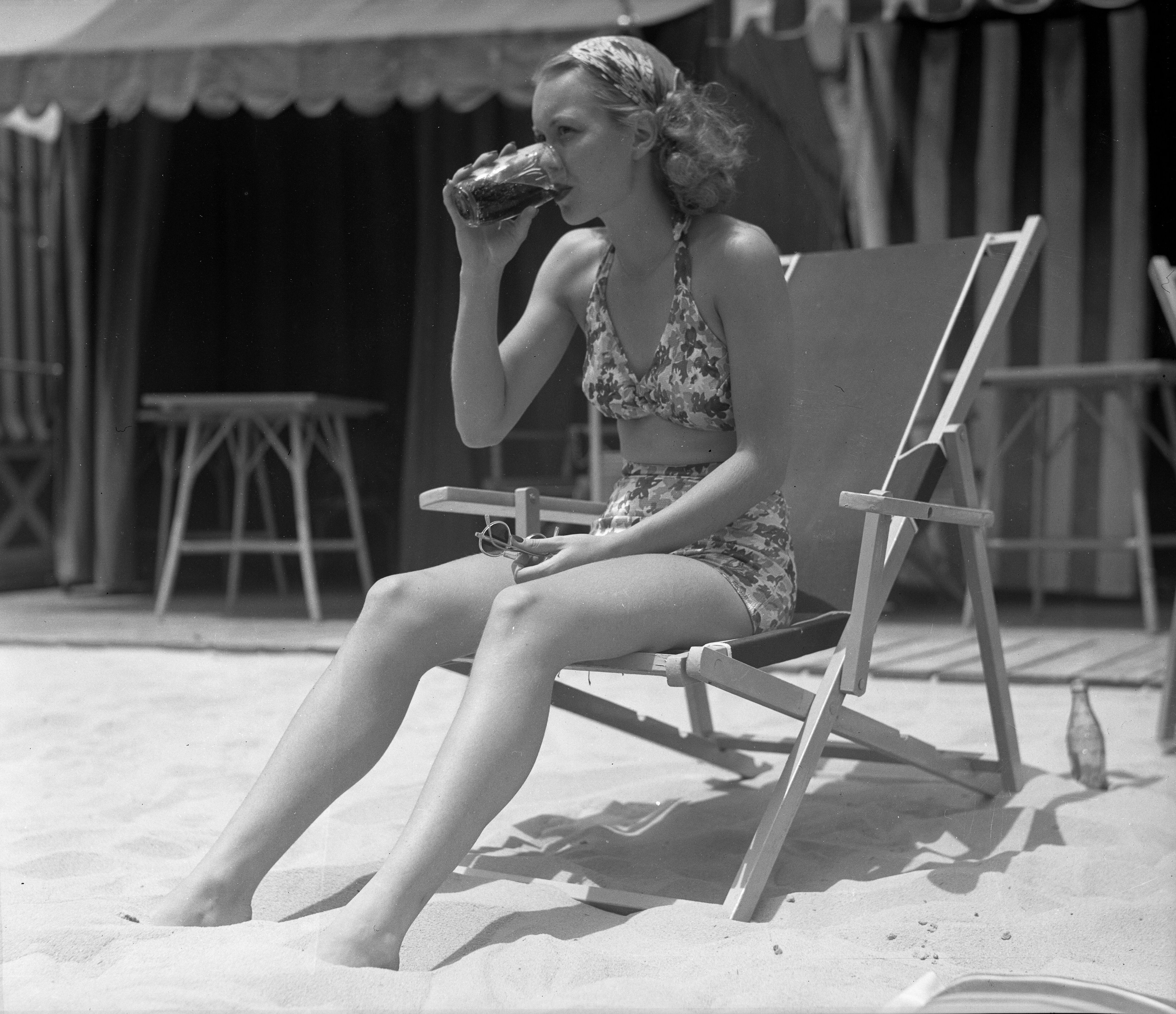
Academy Award-winning actress Jane Wyman on a California beach in a two-piece swimsuit that bares the legs and midriff, 1935

By the 1930s, necklines plunged at the back, sleeves disappeared and sides were cut away and tightened. With the development of new clothing materials, particularly latex and nylon, through the 1930s swimsuits gradually began hugging the body, with shoulder straps that could be lowered for tanning. Women's swimwear of the 1930s and 1940s incorporated increasing degrees of midriff exposure. Coco Chanel made suntans fashionable, and in 1932 French designer Madeleine Vionnet offered an exposed midriff in an evening gown. They were seen a year later in Gold Diggers of 1933. The Busby Berkeley film Footlight Parade of 1932 showcases aquachoreography that featured bikinis. Dorothy Lamour's The Hurricane (1937) also showed two-piece bathing suits.

The 1934 film Fashions of 1934 featured chorus girls wearing two-piece outfits which look identical to modern bikinis. In 1934, a National Recreation Association study on the use of leisure time found that swimming, encouraged by the freedom of movement the new swimwear designs provided, was second only to movies in popularity as free time activity out of a list of 94 activities. In 1935 American designer Claire McCardell cut out the side panels of a maillot-style bathing suit, the bikini's forerunner. The 1938 invention of the Telescopic Watersuit in shirred elastic cotton ushered into the end the era of wool. Cotton sun-tops, printed with palm trees, and silk or rayon pyjamas, usually with a blouse top, became popular by 1939.

Wartime production during World War II required vast amounts of cotton, silk, nylon, wool, leather, and rubber. In 1942 the United States War Production Board issued Regulation L-85, cutting the use of natural fibers in clothing and mandating a 10% reduction in the amount of fabric in women's beachwear. To comply with the regulations, swimsuit manufacturers produced two-piece suits with bare midriffs. In the summer of 1941 Rita Hayworth was on the cover of Life sitting on the beach in a white Halterneck two-piece with a bared midriff although her navel remained covered.

=== Postwar ===
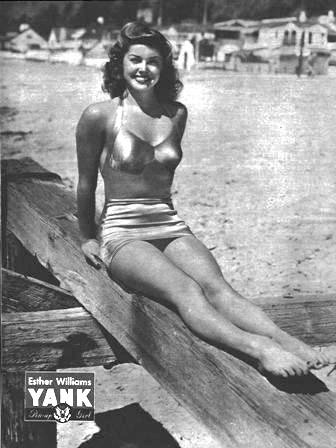
A pin-up of Esther Williams from a 1945 issue of Yank, the Army Weekly

Fabric shortage continued for some time after the end of the war. Two-piece swimsuits without the usual skirt panel and other excess material started appearing in the US when the government ordered a 10% reduction in fabric used in woman's swimwear in 1943 as wartime rationing. By that time, two-piece swimsuits were frequent on American beaches. The July 9, 1945, Life shows women in Paris wearing similar items. Hollywood stars like Ava Gardner, Rita Hayworth and Lana Turner tried similar swimwear or beachwear. Pin ups of Hayworth and Esther Williams in the costume were widely distributed. The most provocative swimsuit was the 1946 Moonlight Buoy, a bottom and a top of material that weighed only eight ounces. What made the Moonlight Buoy distinctive was a large cork buckle attached to the bottoms, which made it possible to tie the top to the cork buckle and splash around au naturel while keeping both parts of the suit afloat. Life magazine had a photo essay on the Moonlight Buoy and wrote, "The name of the suit, of course, suggests the nocturnal conditions under which nude swimming is most agreeable."

American designer Adele Simpson, a Coty American Fashion Critics' Awards winner (1947) and a notable alumna of the New York art school Pratt Institute, who believed clothes must be comfortable and practical, designed a large part of her swimwear line with one-piece suits that were considered fashionable even in the early 1980s. This was when Cole of California started marketing revealing prohibition suits and Catalina Swimwear introduced almost bare-back designs. Teen magazines of late 1940s and 1950s featured designs of midriff-baring suits and tops. However, midriff fashion was stated as only for beaches and informal events and considered indecent to be worn in public. Hollywood endorsed the new glamour with films such as Neptune's Daughter (1949) in which Esther Williams wore provocatively named costumes such as "Double Entendre" and "Honey Child". Williams, who also was an Amateur Athletic Union champion in the 100 meter freestyle (1939) and an Olympics swimming finalist (1940), also portrayed Kellerman in the 1952 film Million Dollar Mermaid (titled as The One Piece Bathing Suit in UK).

Swimwear of the 1940s, 50s and early 60s followed the silhouette mostly from the early 1930s. Keeping in line with the ultra-feminine look dominated by Dior, it evolved into a dress with cinched waists and constructed bustlines, accessorized with earrings, bracelets, hats, scarves, sunglasses, hand bags and cover-ups. Many of these pre-bikinis had fancy names like Double Entendre, Honey Child (to maximize small bosoms), Shipshape (to minimize large bosoms), Diamond Lil (trimmed with rhinestones and lace), Swimming In Mink (trimmed with fur across the bodice) and Spearfisherman (heavy poplin with a rope belt for carrying a knife), Beau Catcher, Leading Lady, Pretty Foxy, Side Issue, Forecast, and Fabulous Fit. According to Vogue the swimwear had become more of "state of dress, not undress" by the mid-1950s.

== The modern bikini ==
Micheline Bernardini modeling one of the first modern bikinis

French fashion designer Jacques Heim, who owned a beach shop in the French Riviera resort town of Cannes, introduced a minimalist two-piece design in May 1946 which he named the "Atome", after the smallest known particle of matter. The bottom of his design was just large enough to cover the wearer's navel.

At the same time, Louis Réard, a French automotive and mechanical engineer, was running his mother's lingerie business near the Folies Bergère in Paris. He noticed women on St. Tropez beaches rolling up the edges of their swimsuits to get a better tan and was inspired to produce a more minimal design. He trimmed additional fabric off the bottom of the swimsuit, exposing the wearer's navel for the first time. Réard's string bikini consisted of four triangles made from 30 square inches (194 cm^{2}) of fabric printed with a newspaper pattern.

When Réard sought a model to wear his design at his press conference, none of the usual models would wear the suit, so he hired 19 year old nude dancer Micheline Bernardini from the Casino de Paris. He introduced his design to the media and public on July 5, 1946, in Paris at Piscine Molitor, a public pool in Paris. Réard held the press conference five days after the first test of a nuclear device (nicknamed Able) over the Bikini Atoll during Operation Crossroads. His swimsuit design shocked the press and public because it was the first to reveal the wearer's navel.

To promote his new design, Heim hired skywriters to fly above the Mediterranean resort advertising the Atome as "the world's smallest bathing suit." Not to be outdone by Heim, Réard hired his own skywriters three weeks later to fly over the French Riviera advertising his design as "smaller than the smallest bathing suit in the world."

Heim's design was the first to be worn on the beach, but the name given by Réard stuck with the public. Despite significant social resistance, Réard received more than 50,000 letters from fans. He also initiated a bold ad campaign that told the public a two-piece swimsuit was not a genuine bikini "unless it could be pulled through a wedding ring." According to Kevin Jones, curator and fashion historian at the Fashion Institute of Design & Merchandising, "Réard was ahead of his time by about 15 to 20 years. Only women in the vanguard, mostly upper-class European women embraced it."

After actress Brigitte Bardot gained international attention in 1953 as the bikini girl of the French Riviera, Paparazzi popularized revealing accidents or staged events with women's swimwear throughout the decade. For one of many instances, a cheesecake photo of rising starlet Daliah Lavi adjusting her bikini after it broke while at a Rio de Janeiro swimming pool was widely circulated by Associated Press in 1959.

=== Social resistance ===
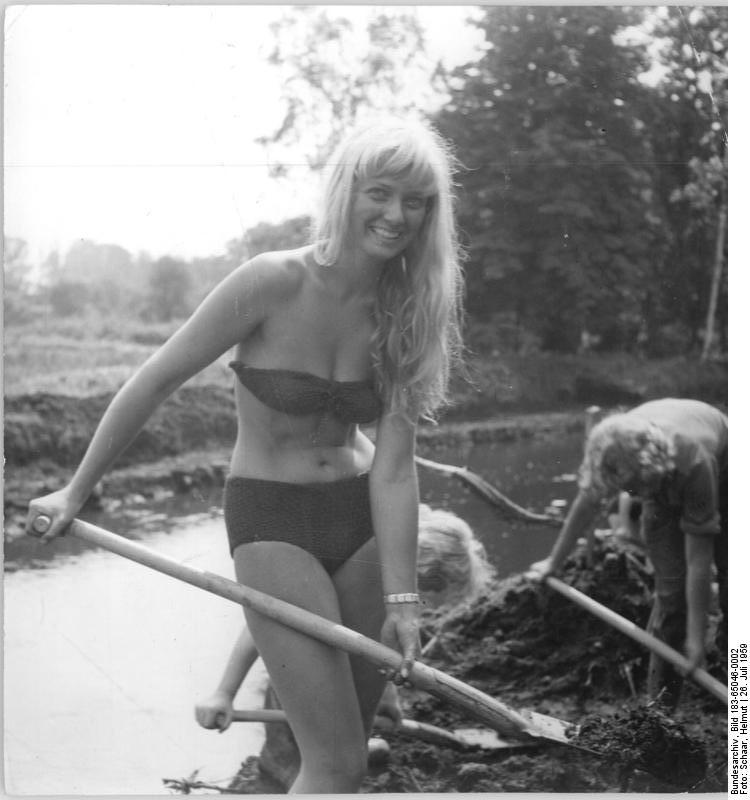
A student wearing a bikini in Leipzig, East Germany, 1959

Bikini sales did not pick up around the world as women stuck to traditional two-piece swimsuits. Réard went back to designing conventional knickers to sell in his mother's shop. According to Kevin Jones, curator and fashion historian at the Fashion Institute of Design & Merchandising, "Réard was ahead of his time by about 15 to 20 years. Only women in the vanguard, mostly upper-class European women embraced it, just like the upper-class European women who first cast off their corsets after World War I." It was banned in the French Atlantic coastline, Spain, Belgium and Italy, three countries neighboring France, as well as Portugal and Australia, and it was prohibited in some US states, and discouraged in others.

In 1951, the first Miss World contest (originally the Festival Bikini Contest), was organized by Eric Morley. When the winner, Kiki Håkansson from Sweden, was crowned in a bikini, countries with religious traditions threatened to withdraw delegates. Håkansson remains the first and last Miss World to be crowned in her bikini, a crowning that was condemned by Pope Pius XII who declared the swimsuit to be sinful. Bikinis were banned from beauty pageants around the world after the controversy. In 1949 the Los Angeles Times reported that Miss America Bebe Shopp on her visit to Paris said she did not approve the bikini for American girls, though she did not mind French girls wearing them. Actresses in movies like My Favorite Brunette (1947) and the model on a 1948 cover of LIFE were shown in traditional two-piece swimwear, not the bikini.

In 1950, Time magazine interviewed American swimsuit mogul Fred Cole, owner of Cole of California, and reported that he had "little but scorn for France's famed Bikinis," because they were designed for "diminutive Gallic women". "French girls have short legs," he explained. "Swimsuits have to be hiked up at the sides to make their legs look longer." Réard himself described it as a two-piece bathing suit which "reveals everything about a girl except for her mother's maiden name." Even Esther Williams commented, "A bikini is a thoughtless act." But, popularity of the charms of Pin-up queen and Hollywood star Williams were to vanish along with pre-bikinis with fancy names over the next few decades. Australian designer Paula Straford introduced the bikini to the Gold Coast in 1952, where it was banned until 1959. In 1957, the magazine Das moderne Mädchen (The Modern Girl) wrote, "It is unthinkable that a decent girl with tact would ever wear such a thing." Eight years later a Munich student was punished with six days cleaning work at an old people's home because she had strolled across the central Viktualienmarkt square, Munich in a bikini.

=== The Cannes connection ===
Despite the controversy, some in France admired "naughty girls who decorate our sun-drenched beaches". Brigitte Bardot, photographed wearing similar garments on beaches during the Cannes Film Festival (1953) helped popularize the bikini in Europe in the 1950s and created a market in the US. Photographs of Bardot in a bikini, according to The Guardian, turned Saint-Tropez into the bikini capital of the world. Cannes played a crucial role in the career of Brigitte Bardot, who in turn played a crucial role in promoting the Festival, largely by starting the trend of being photographed in a bikini at her first appearance at the festival, with Bardot identified as the original Cannes bathing beauty. In 1952, she wore a bikini in Manina, the Girl in the Bikini (1952) (released in France as Manina, la fille sans voiles), a film which drew considerable attention due to her scanty swimsuit. During the 1953 Cannes Film Festival, she worked with her husband and agent Roger Vadim, and garnered a lot of attention when she was photographed wearing a bikini on every beach in the south of France.

Like Esther Williams did a decade earlier, Betty Grable, Marilyn Monroe and Brigitte Bardot all used revealing swimwears as career props to enhance their sex appeal, and it became more accepted in parts of Europe when worn by fifties "love goddess" actresses such as Bardot, Anita Ekberg and Sophia Loren. British actress Diana Dors had a mink bikini made for her during the 1955 Venice Film Festival and wore it riding in a gondola down Venice's Grand Canal past St. Mark's Square.

In Spain, Benidorm played a similar role as Cannes. Shortly after the bikini was banned in Spain, Pedro Zaragoza, the mayor of Benidorm convinced dictator Francisco Franco that his town needed to legalize the bikini to draw tourists. In 1959, General Franco agreed and the town became a popular tourist destination. In less than four years since Franco's death in 1979, Spanish beaches and women had gone topless.

=== Legal and moral resistance ===
The swimsuit was banned in Spain, Portugal and Italy, three countries neighboring France, as well as Belgium and Australia, and it remained prohibited in many US states. As late as in 1959, Anne Cole, a US swimsuit designer and daughter of Fred Cole, said about a Bardot bikini, "It's nothing more than a G-string. It's at the razor's edge of decency." In July that year the New York Post searched for bikinis around New York City and found only a couple. Writer Meredith Hall wrote in her memoir that until 1965 one could get a citation for wearing a bikini in Hampton Beach, New Hampshire.

In 1951, the first Miss World contest, originally the Festival Bikini Contest, was organized by Eric Morley as a mid-century advertisement for swimwear at the Festival of Britain. The press welcomed the spectacle and referred to it as Miss World, and Morley registered the name as a trademark. When, the winner Kiki Håkansson from Sweden, was crowned in a bikini, countries with religious traditions threatened to withdraw delegates. The bikinis were outlawed and evening gowns introduced instead. Håkansson remains the only Miss World crowned in a bikini, a crowning that was condemned by the Pope. Bikini was banned from beauty pageants around the world after the controversy. Catholic-majority countries like Belgium, Italy, Spain and Australia also banned the swimsuit that same year.

The National Legion of Decency pressured Hollywood to keep bikinis from being featured in Hollywood movies. The Hays production code for US movies, introduced in 1930 but not strictly enforced until 1934, allowed two-piece gowns but prohibited navels on screen. But between the introduction and enforcement of the code two Tarzan movies, Tarzan, the Ape Man (1932) and Tarzan and His Mate (1934), were released in which actress Maureen O'Sullivan wore skimpy bikini-like leather outfits. Film historian Bruce Goldstein described her clothes in the first film as "It's a loincloth open up the side. You can see loin." All at Sea (a.k.a. Barnacle Bill) was allowed in the US in 1957 after all bikini-type clothes were removed from the film. The Girl in the Bikini was allowed in Kansas after all the bikini close ups were removed from the film in 1959.

In reaction to the introduction of the bikini in Paris, American swimwear manufacturers compromised cautiously by producing their own similar design that included a halter and a midriff-bottom variation. Though size makes all the difference in a bikini, early bikinis often covered the navel. When the navel showed in pictures, it was airbrushed out by magazines like Seventeen. Navel-less women ensured the early dominance of European bikini makers over their American counterparts. By the end of the decade a vogue for strapless styles developed, wired or bound for firmness and fit, along with a taste for bare-shouldered two-pieces called Little Sinners but it was the halterneck bikini that caused the most moral controversy because of its degree of exposure. So much so that bikini designs called "Huba Huba" and "Revelation" were withdrawn from fashion parades in Sydney as immodest.

== Rise to popularity ==
Time magazine list of top 10 bikinis in popular culture

- Micheline Bernardini models the first-Ever Bikini (1946)
- "Itsy Bitsy Teenie Weenie Yellow Polka Dot Bikini" (1960)
- Annette Funicello and Beach Party (1960s)
- The belted Bond-girl bikini (1962)
- Sports Illustrated's first Swimsuit Issue (1964)
- Raquel Welch's fur bikini in One Million Years B.C. (1966)
- Phoebe Cates' Bikini in Fast Times at Ridgemont High (1982)
- Princess Leia's golden bikini in Return of the Jedi (1983)
- The official uniform of the female Olympic Beach Volleyball players (1996)
- Miss America pageant's bikini debut (1997)

— Source: Chris Gayomali, "Top 10 Bikinis in Pop Culture", Time online, 07-05-2011

The appearance of bikinis kept increasing both on screen and off. The sex appeal prompted film and television productions, including Dr. Strangelove. They include the surf movies of the early 1960s. In 1960, Brian Hyland's song "Itsy Bitsy Teenie Weenie Yellow Polka Dot Bikini" inspired a bikini-buying spree. By 1963, the movie Beach Party, starring Annette Funicello and Frankie Avalon, followed by Muscle Beach Party (1964), Bikini Beach (1964), and Beach Blanket Bingo (1965) that depicted teenage girls wearing bikinis, frolicking in the sand with boys, and having a great time.

The beach films led a wave of films that made the bikini a pop-culture symbol. In the sexual revolution in 1960s America, bikinis became quickly popular. Hollywood stars like Marilyn Monroe, Jayne Mansfield, Gina Lollobrigida, and Jane Russell helped further the growing popularity of bikinis. Pin-up posters of Monroe, Mansfield, Hayworth, Bardot and Raquel Welch also contributed significantly to its increasing popularity. In 1962, Playboy featured a bikini on its cover for the first time. Two years later, Sports Illustrated featured Berlin-born fashion model Babette March on the cover wearing a white bikini. The issue was the first Swimsuit Issue. It has been credited with giving the bikini legitimacy, and it became an annual publication and an American pop-culture staple, and sells millions of copies each year. In 1965, a woman told Time it was "almost square" not to wear one. In 1967 the magazine wrote that 65% of "the young set" were wearing bikinis.

When Jayne Mansfield and her husband Miklós Hargitay toured for stage shows, newspapers wrote that Mansfield convinced the rural population that she owned more bikinis than anyone. She showed a fair amount of her 40-inch (1,000 mm) bust, as well as her midriff and legs, in the leopard-spot bikini she wore for her stage shows. Kathryn Wexler of The Miami Herald wrote, "In the beginning as we know it, there was Jayne Mansfield. Here she preens in leopard-print or striped bikinis, sucking in air to showcase her well noted physical assets." Her leopard-skin bikini remains one of the earlier specimens of the fashion.

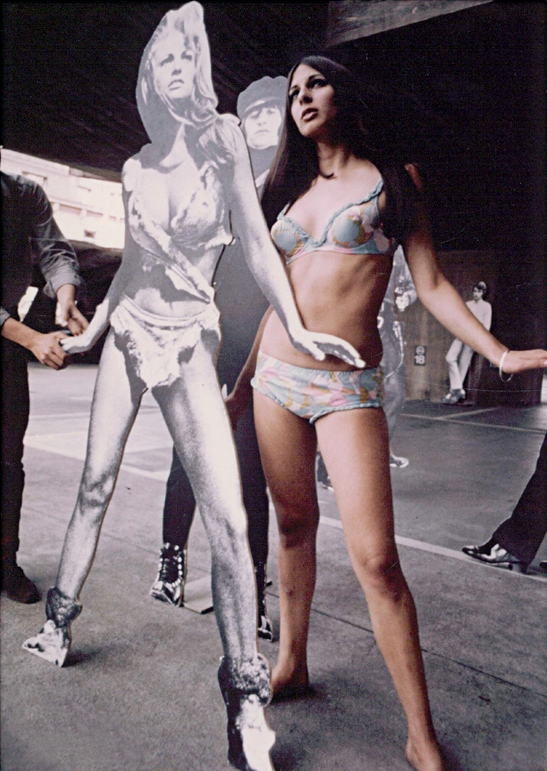
Publicity featuring fur bikini worn by Raquel Welch in One Million Years B.C. (1966)

In 1962, Bond Girl Ursula Andress emerged from the sea wearing a white bikini in Dr. No. The scene has been named one of the most memorable of the series. Channel 4 declared it the top bikini moment in film history, Virgin Media puts it ninth in its top ten, and top in the Bond girls. The Herald (Glasgow) put the scene as best ever on the basis of a poll. It also helped shape the career of Ursula Andress, and the look of the quintessential Bond movie. Andress said that she owed her career to that white bikini, remarking, "This bikini made me into a success. As a result of starring in Dr. No as the first Bond girl, I was given the freedom to take my pick of future roles and to become financially independent." In 2001, the Dr. No bikini worn by Andress in the film sold at auction for US$61,500. That white bikini has been described as a "defining moment in the sixties liberalization of screen eroticism". Because of the shocking effect from how revealing it was at the time, she got referred to by the joke nickname "Ursula Undress". According to the British Broadcasting Corporation, "So iconic was the look that it was repeated 40 years later by Halle Berry in the Bond movie Die Another Day."

Raquel Welch's fur bikini in One Million Years B.C. (1966) has been cited as an iconic bikini and cinematic moment. The movie made her a pin-up girl and fashion icon and the bikini was later described as a "definitive look of the 1960s". One author said, "although she had only three lines in the film, her luscious figure in a fur bikini made her a star and the dream girl of millions of young moviegoers". In 2011, Time listed Welch's bikini in the "Top Ten Bikinis in Pop Culture".

In the 1983 film Return of the Jedi, Star Wars' Princess Leia Organa was captured by Jabba the Hutt and forced to wear a metal bikini complete with shackles. The costume was made of brass and was so uncomfortable that actress Carrie Fisher described it as "what supermodels will eventually wear in the seventh ring of hell." The "slave Leia" look is often imitated by female fans at Star Wars conventions. In 1997, 51 years after the bikini's debut, and 77 years after the Miss America Pageant was founded, contestants were allowed wear two-piece swimsuits, not just the swimsuits (nicknamed "bulletproof vests") traditionally issued by the pageant. Two of the 17 swimsuit finalists wore two-piece swimsuits, and Erika Kauffman, representing Hawaii, wore the briefest bikini of all and won the swimsuit competition. In 2010, the International Federation of Bodybuilders recognized Bikini as a new competitive category.

=== In India ===
Bollywood actress Sharmila Tagore appeared in a bikini in An Evening in Paris (1967), a film mostly remembered for the first bikini appearance of an Indian actress. She also posed in a bikini for the glossy Filmfare magazine. The costume shocked the conservative Indian audience, but it also set a trend of bikini-clad actresses carried forward by Parveen Babi (in Yeh Nazdeekiyan, 1982), Zeenat Aman (in Heera Panna 1973; Qurbani, 1980) and Dimple Kapadia (in Bobby, 1973) in the early 1970s. Wearing a bikini put her name in the Indian press as one of Bollywood's ten hottest actresses of all time, and was a transgression of female identity through a reversal of the state of modesty, which functions as a signifier of femininity in Bombay films. By 2005, it became usual for actors in Indian films to change outfits a dozen times in a single song — starting with a chiffon sari and ending up wearing a bikini but, when Tagore was the chairperson of the Central Board of Film Certification in 2005, she expressed concerns about the rise of the bikini in Indian films.

== Acceptance ==
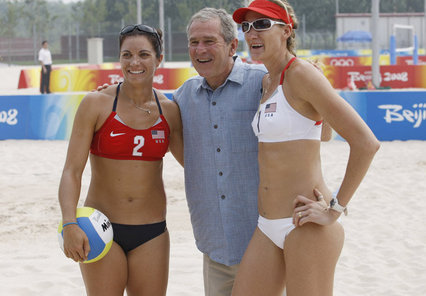
Then U.S. president George W. Bush with Misty May-Treanor (left) and Kerri Walsh Jennings of the U.S. Women's Beach Volleyball team (in their bikini uniforms) at the 2008 Beijing Olympics.

In France, Réard's company folded in 1988, four years after his death. By that year the bikini made up nearly 20% of swimsuit sales, more than any other model in the US. As skin cancer awareness grew and a simpler aesthetic defined fashion in the 1990s, sales of the skimpy bikini decreased dramatically. The new swimwear code was epitomized by surf star Malia Jones, who appeared on the June 1997 cover of Shape Magazine wearing a halter top two-piece for rough water. After the 90s, however, the bikini came back again. US market research company NPD Group reported that sales of two-piece swimsuits nationwide jumped 80% in two years. On one hand the one-piece made a big comeback in the 1980s and early 1990s, on the other bikinis became briefer with the string bikini in the 1970s and 1980s.

The "-kini family" (as dubbed by author William Safire), including the "-ini sisters" (as dubbed by designer Anne Cole) has grown to include a number of variations, including the string bikini, monokini or numokini (top part missing), seekini (transparent bikini), tankini (tank top, bikini bottom), camikini (camisole top and bikini bottom), hikini, thong, slingshot, minimini, teardrop, and micro. In one fashion show in 1985, there were two-piece swimsuits with cropped tank tops instead of the usual skimpy bandeaux, swimsuits that were bikinis in front and one-piece behind, suspender straps, ruffles, and navel-baring cutouts. To meet fast-changing tastes, a Floridian manufacturer began producing made-to-order bikinis in around seven minutes. The world's most expensive bikini, made up of over 150 carats (30 g) of diamonds and worth £20 million, was designed in February 2006 by Susan Rosen.

Actresses in action films like Charlie's Angels: Full Throttle (2003) and Blue Crush (2002) have made the two-piece "the millennial equivalent of the power suit", according to Gina Bellafonte of The New York Times, On September 9, 1997, Miss Maryland Jamie Fox was the first contestant in 50 years to compete in a two-piece swimsuit to compete in the Preliminary Swimsuit Competition at the Miss America Pageant. PETA used celebrities like Pamela Anderson, Traci Bingham and Alicia Mayer wearing a bikini made of iceberg-lettuce for an advertisement campaign to promote vegetarianism. A protester from Columbia University used a bikini as a message board against a New York City visit by Iranian president Mahmoud Ahmadinejad.

By the end of the century, the bikini went on to become the most popular beachwear around the globe, according to French fashion historian Olivier Saillard due to "the power of women, and not the power of fashion". As he explains, "The emancipation of swimwear has always been linked to the emancipation of women", though one survey tells 85% of all bikinis never touch the water. According to Beth Dincuff Charleston, research associate at the Costume Institute of the Metropolitan Museum of Art, "The bikini represents a social leap involving body consciousness, moral concerns, and sexual attitudes." By the early 2000s, bikinis had become a US$811 million business annually, according to the NPD Group, a consumer and retail information company. The bikini has boosted spin-off services like bikini waxing and the sun tanning industries.

=== Continued controversies ===
The bikini remained a popular topic for the news media. In May 2011, a council by-law in Barcelona, Spain made it illegal to wear bikinis in public except in areas near the beaches. Violators faced fines of between 120 and 300 euros. In 2012, two students of St. Theresa's College in Cebu, the Philippines, were barred from attending their graduation ceremony for "ample body exposure" because their bikini pictures were posted on Facebook. The students sued the college and won a temporary stay in a regional court.

In May 2013, Cambridge University banned the Wyverns Club of Magdalene College from arranging its annual bikini jelly wrestling contest. In June 2013, actress Gwyneth Paltrow, produced a bikini for her clothing line that is designed to be worn by girls 4 to 8 years old. She was criticized for sexualizing young children by Claude Knight of Kidscape, a British foundation that strives to prevent child abuse. He commented, "We remain very opposed to the sexualisation of children and of childhood ... is a great pity that such trends continue and that they carry celebrity endorsement."

Four women were arrested over the 2013 Memorial Day weekend in Myrtle Beach, South Carolina for indecent exposure when they wore thong bikinis that exposed their buttocks. In June 2013, a commercial that included Pamela Anderson dancing in a bikini was banned by the British Advertising Standards Authority for degrading women. Anderson played an office worker who became the subject of a sexual fantasy of one of her male colleagues. In 2002, clothing retailer Abercrombie & Fitch came under criticism for selling child-sized thong bikinis and underwear.

== See also ==
- Bikini in popular culture
- Bikini variants
- History of swimwear
