= Tan line =

Visible differences in skin color due to tanning

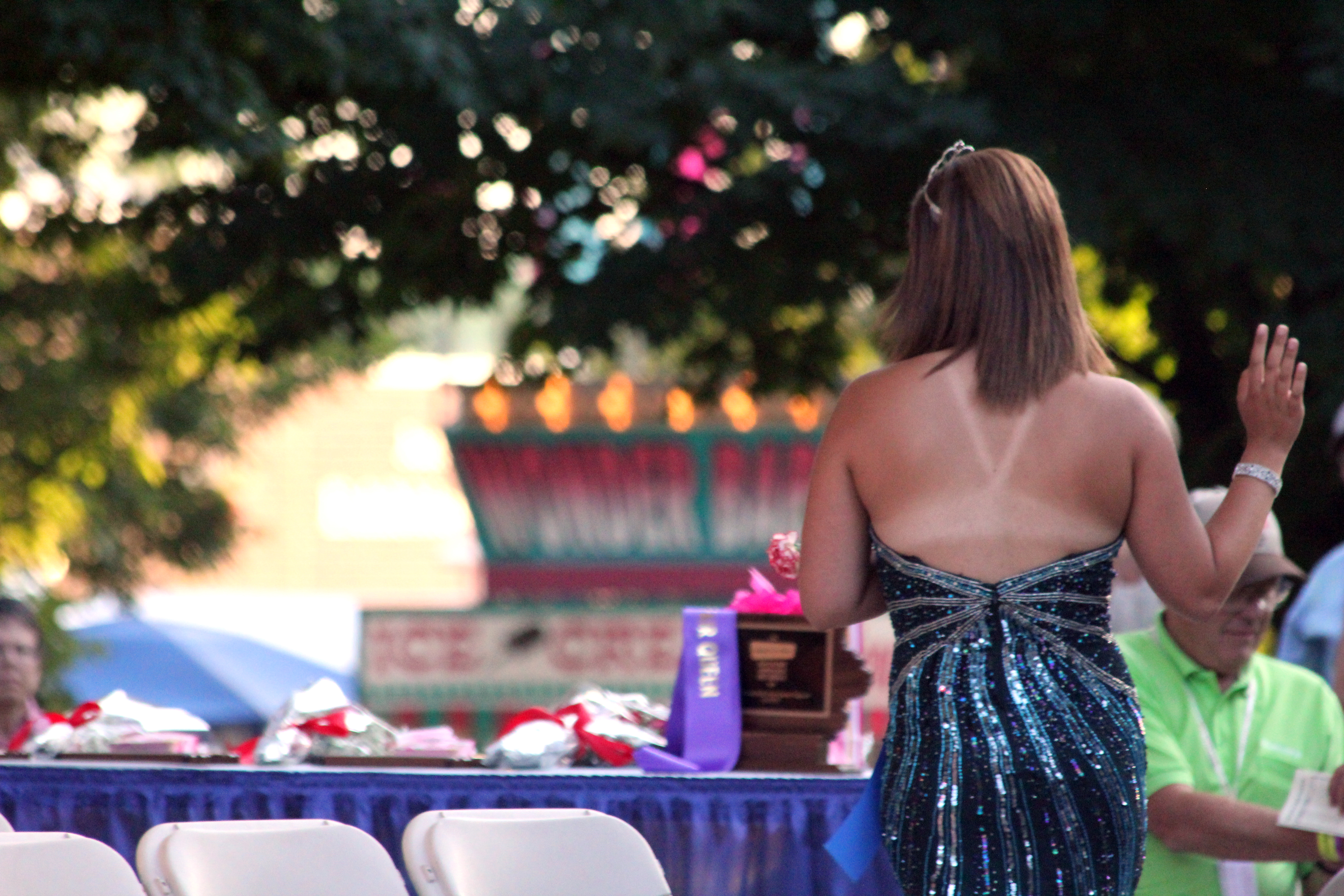
A woman at the Iowa State Fair wears a backless dress revealing her swimsuit tan lines.

A tan line is a visually clear division on the human skin between an area of pronounced comparative paleness relative to other areas that have been suntanned by exposure to ultraviolet (UV) radiation or by sunless tanning. The source of the radiation may be the sun or artificial UV sources such as tanning lamps. Tan lines are usually an unintentional result of a work environment or recreational activities, but are sometimes intentional. Many people seek to avoid tan lines that will be visible when regular clothes are worn.

== Common occupation-related tan lines ==
=== Farmer's tan ===
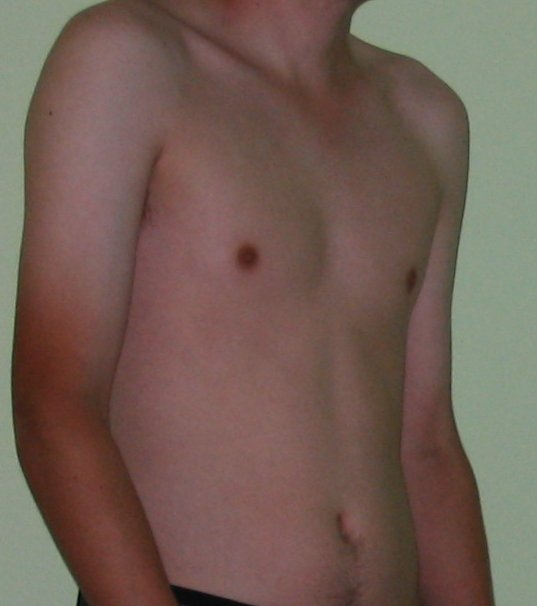
A farmer's tan

A "farmer's tan" (also called "golfer's tan", "sailor's tan", or "tennis tan") refers to the typical tan lines developed by regular outdoor activity when wearing a short sleeve shirt. The farmer's tan usually starts with a suntan covering the exposed parts of the arms and neck. It is distinct in that the shoulders, chest, and back remain unaffected by the sun. Tennis and golf additionally cause recognizable tans on the middle section of the legs due to the wearing of shorts and socks for prolonged hours in the sun.

The "Texas tan" is similar, with the exception that the shoulders are also affected by the sun, caused by working outdoors while wearing a sleeveless shirt.

Some of the common tan lines associated with a farmer's tan include:

- elbows (from a short-sleeve shirt)
- neck (from shirt collar. The derogatory word redneck comes from farmers getting this tan line)
- thighs (if shorts are worn)
- ankles (from socks, only if exposed)
- forehead (if a hat is worn)
- wrist (if a watch is worn)
- eyes (if sunglasses are worn)

=== Driver's tan ===
A "driver's tan" (or similar terms such as "trucker's tan" or "taxi driver's arm") is a tanning pattern where one arm is tanned significantly more than the other arm due to extensive driving of a motor vehicle with the window down.

=== Sandal tan ===
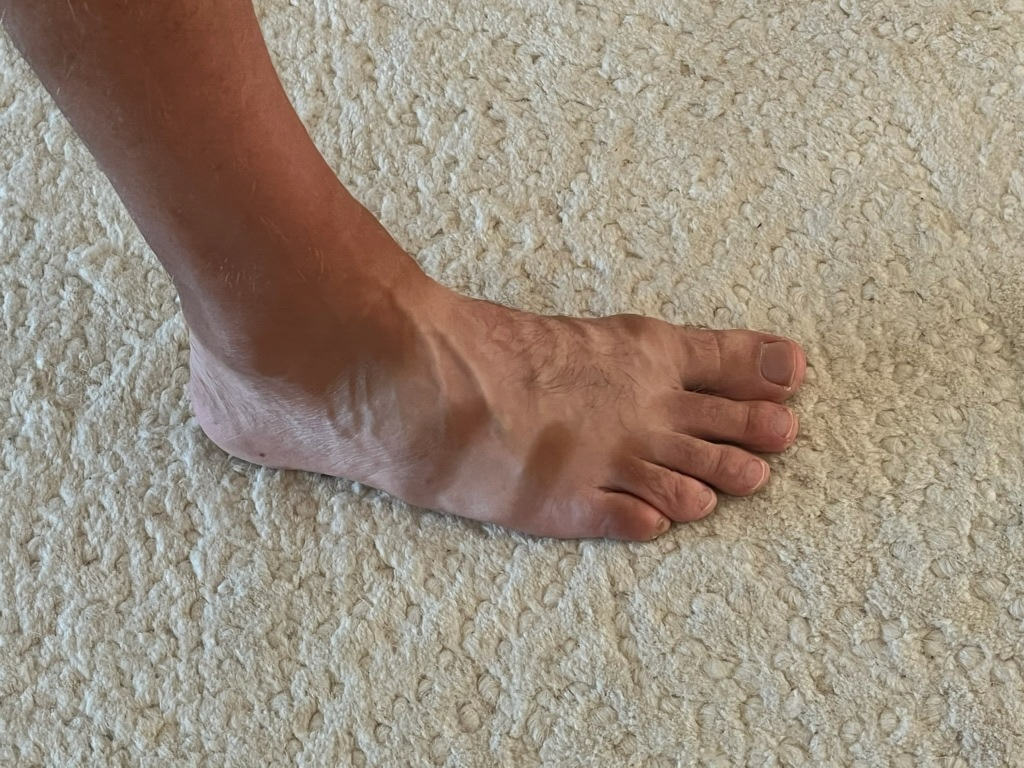
A close-up photograph of a man's right foot. The foot is tanned, with clear tan lines visible where the sandal straps have been. The toes and the top of the foot are darker than the areas covered by the sandal straps, creating a distinct pattern.

A "sandal tan" is a set of distinctive tan lines on the feet, resulting from the straps of sandals worn throughout the summer.

== Common recreation-related tan lines ==
=== Bikini tan ===
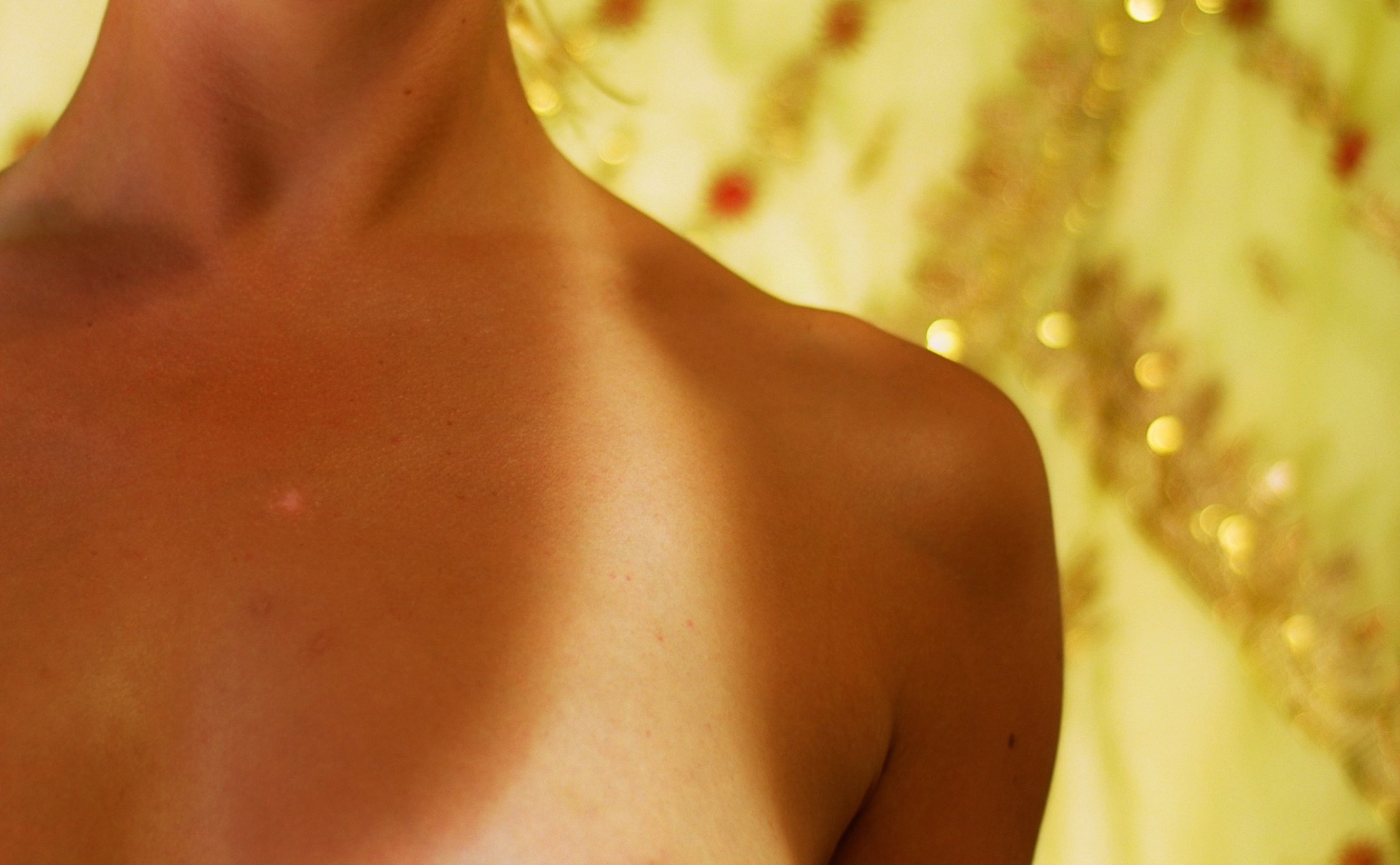
Tan lines created by a bikini

Wearing a bikini in the sun results in the uncovered skin becoming suntanned and creates a "bikini tan". These tan lines separate pale breasts, crotch, and buttocks from otherwise tanned skin. "Racing stripes" may refer to the portion of a bikini tan line exposed when wearing one-piece swimwear.

=== Biker's tan ===
A "biker's tan" is a tan line three-quarters up each leg, where bike shorts would generally begin to cover. Depending on the activity, the inner side of the arms may be paler than the outer side. Unless the biker uses cycling gloves made to allow tanning, the area on the back of each hand will usually not be tanned.

=== Goggle tan ===
Raccoon-like tan lines can emerge around the eyes after wearing goggles, common among industrial workers (wearing safety glasses), skiers, snowboarders, and swimmers.

=== Golfers tan ===
A golfer's tan is typically a tan on the back of a shaved or bald head that forms when a baseball cap is worn. There is a semicircle-shaped tan that forms from the strap, which adjusts the hat's size.

=== Soccer tan ===
A soccer tan is a stripe of tan from the lower thighs to the bottom of the knees common to soccer players; the upper thighs and lower legs are covered by shorts and shin guards/socks.

=== Football tan ===
A "football tan" is a stripe of tan from below the knees to just above the ankle; the thighs, knees, and ankles are covered by uniform pants and ankle socks. The arms are often tanned like a farmer's tan, but the face is untanned due to wearing a helmet. This tanning effect can be particularly pronounced since many football teams run two-a-day practices during the summer.

=== Tiger tan ===
A "tiger tan" is made up of two tan stripes on the arm of a lacrosse player, resulting from the gaps between gloves, elbow pads, and shoulder pads.

== Intentional tan lines ==
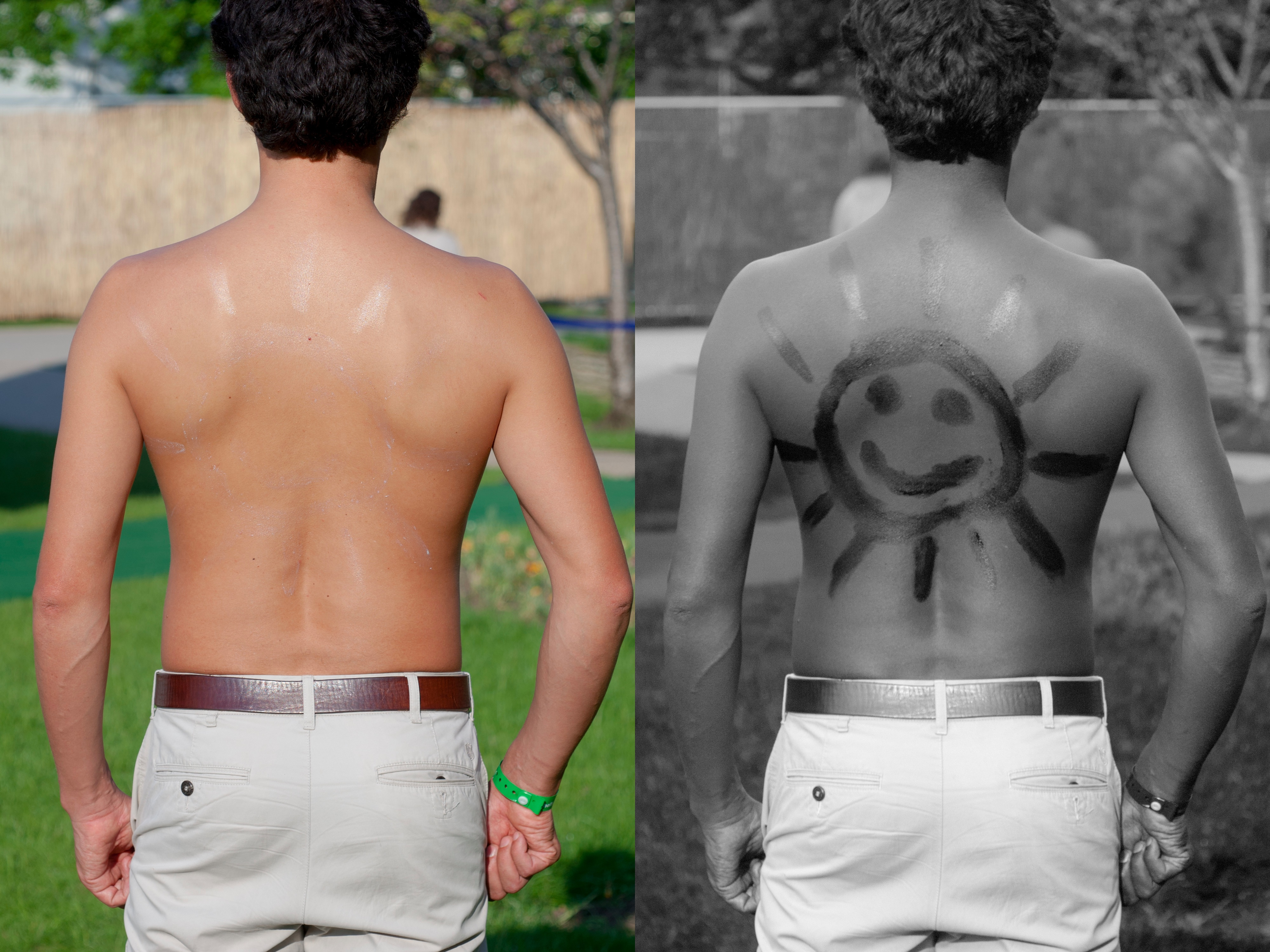
Sunscreen on back under normal and UV light

One of the common uses for tanning beds is the option of tanning entirely nude to reduce the appearance of tan lines. In contrast, some people prefer to have tan lines and will wear undergarments or swimwear with the deliberate purpose of creating a sharply defined tan line.

Additionally, "tanning stickers" that attach to the skin while tanning can be purchased. Common designs are a heart, Playboy bunny, and dolphins, but many designs exist. These are typically sold on a roll of 500 to 1000 as single-use, disposable stickers. People can place the sticker on the same area each time they tan (indoors or outdoors), leaving the covered area pale while the rest of their skin tans normally. This allows individuals to see their tanning progress and others to see if the "tan tattoo" is in an exposed area.

It is also possible to use sunscreen to create intentional tan lines that form patterns or words, to make a statement, or to create a design.

== Avoiding tan lines ==
Wearing clothes while tanning results in the creation of tan lines, which many people regard as un-aesthetic. Many people want to avoid tan lines on those body parts that will be visible when they are fully clothed. Some people try to achieve an all-over tan or to maximize their tan coverage. To achieve an all-over tan, tanners need to dispense with clothing and to maximize coverage; they need to minimize the amount of clothing they wear while tanning. For women who cannot dispense with a swimsuit, they sometimes tan with the back strap undone while lying on the front or remove shoulder straps, besides wearing swimsuits covering less area than their normal clothing. Any exposure is subject to local community standards and personal choice. Some people tan in the privacy of their backyard where they can at times tan without clothes, and some countries have set aside clothing-optional swimming areas (popularly known as nude beaches), where people can tan and swim clothes-free. The naturist movement provides completely nude, clothes free sunbathing opportunities in most countries. Some people tan topless, and others wear very brief swimwear, such as a microkini or thong.

A 1969 innovation is tan-through swimwear, which uses fabric perforated with thousands of micro holes that are nearly invisible to the naked eye, but which transmit enough sunlight to approach an all-over tan, especially if the fabric is stretched taut. Tan-through swimwear typically allows more than one-third of UV rays to pass through (equivalent to SPF 3 or less), and an application of sunscreen even to the covered area is recommended but not for all types of tan through fabric. There is fabric that exists that requires no sunscreen underneath as it has built in SPF.
