= Louis Réard =

French engineer and fashion designer (1896–1984)

- Born: 10 October 1896; Lille, France
- Died: 16 September 1984 (aged 87); Lausanne, Switzerland
- Occupations: Automobile engineer; fashion designer
- Known for: Inventor of the modern bikini
- Spouse: Marcelle Réard

Louis Réard (French pronunciation: [lwi ʁeaʁ]; 10 October 1896 – 16 September 1984) was a French automobile engineer and fashion designer who introduced the modern two-piece bikini in July 1946. He ran a swimsuit store in Paris where he sold bikinis for 40 years.

== Early life ==
Louis Réard was born on 10 October 1896 in Lille, France to Dominique Réard and Marie Dufrenoy.

== Launching the bikini ==
Réard was an automotive engineer who took over his mother's lingerie business in about 1940 and became a clothing designer near the Folies Bergère in Paris. While on beaches in Saint-Tropez, he noticed women rolling up the edges of their swimsuits to get a better tan, which inspired him to design a swimsuit with the midriff exposed.

In May 1946, French fashion designer Jacques Heim produced a two-piece swimsuit that he named the Atome, which he advertised as the world's "smallest bathing suit." The bottom of Heim's swimsuit was just large enough to cover the wearer's navel. To promote his new design, Heim hired skywriters to fly above the Mediterranean resort advertising the Atome as "the world’s smallest bathing suit."

Réard quickly produced his own swimsuit design, which was a string bikini consisting of four triangles made from only 30 square inches (194 cm^{2}) of fabric printed with a newspaper pattern. When Réard sought a model to wear his design at its debut presentation, none of the usual models would wear the suit, so he hired 18-year-old nude dancer Micheline Bernardini from the Casino de Paris to model it.

He introduced his new swimsuit, which he named the bikini, to the media and public in Paris on 5 July 1946 at Piscine Molitor, a popular public pool in Paris at the time. He introduced his design four days after the first test of a nuclear weapon at Bikini Atoll. The event received widespread coverage in the press, and Réard hoped for the same with his design. It was marketed with the slogan, "The bikini, the first anatomical bomb" (la première bombe anatomique).

Réard hired his own skywriters to fly over the French Riviera advertising his design as "smaller than the smallest bathing suit in the world." Photographs of Micheline Bernardini and articles about the event were widely carried by the press. The International Herald Tribune alone ran nine stories on the event. Fourteen days later, Réard applied for a patent for his design, and was awarded patent number 19431.

While two-piece swimsuits had been available since at least the 1910s, Réard's bikini was especially controversial because it was the first to expose the wearer's navel.

== Marketing of the bikini ==
The bikini was very popular, especially among men, and Bernardini received some 50,000 fan letters. Although Heim's design was the first worn on the beach, Réard's design and his name for it stuck in the public consciousness. Réard's business soared, and in advertisements he kept the bikini mystique alive by declaring that a two-piece suit wasn't a genuine bikini "unless it could be pulled through a wedding ring."

As a further booster for sales, Réard commissioned coachbuilder Henri Chapron to build an extravagant "road yacht" by converting a Packard V8 car into a mock luxury cabin cruiser complete with a cockpit, portholes, an anchor, a signal mast, and other nautical regalia. The car went on advertising parades and followed the Tour de France in the early 1950s, with a crew of bikini-clad girls, causing quite a sensation.

== Later life and death ==
Réard eventually opened a bikini shop in Paris and sold swimsuits for 40 years. In 1980, Réard moved with his wife, Marcelle Réard, from France to Lausanne, Switzerland. He died in Lausanne on 16 September 1984 at the age of 87.
