= Piscine Molitor =

Swimming pool and hotel complex in Paris, France

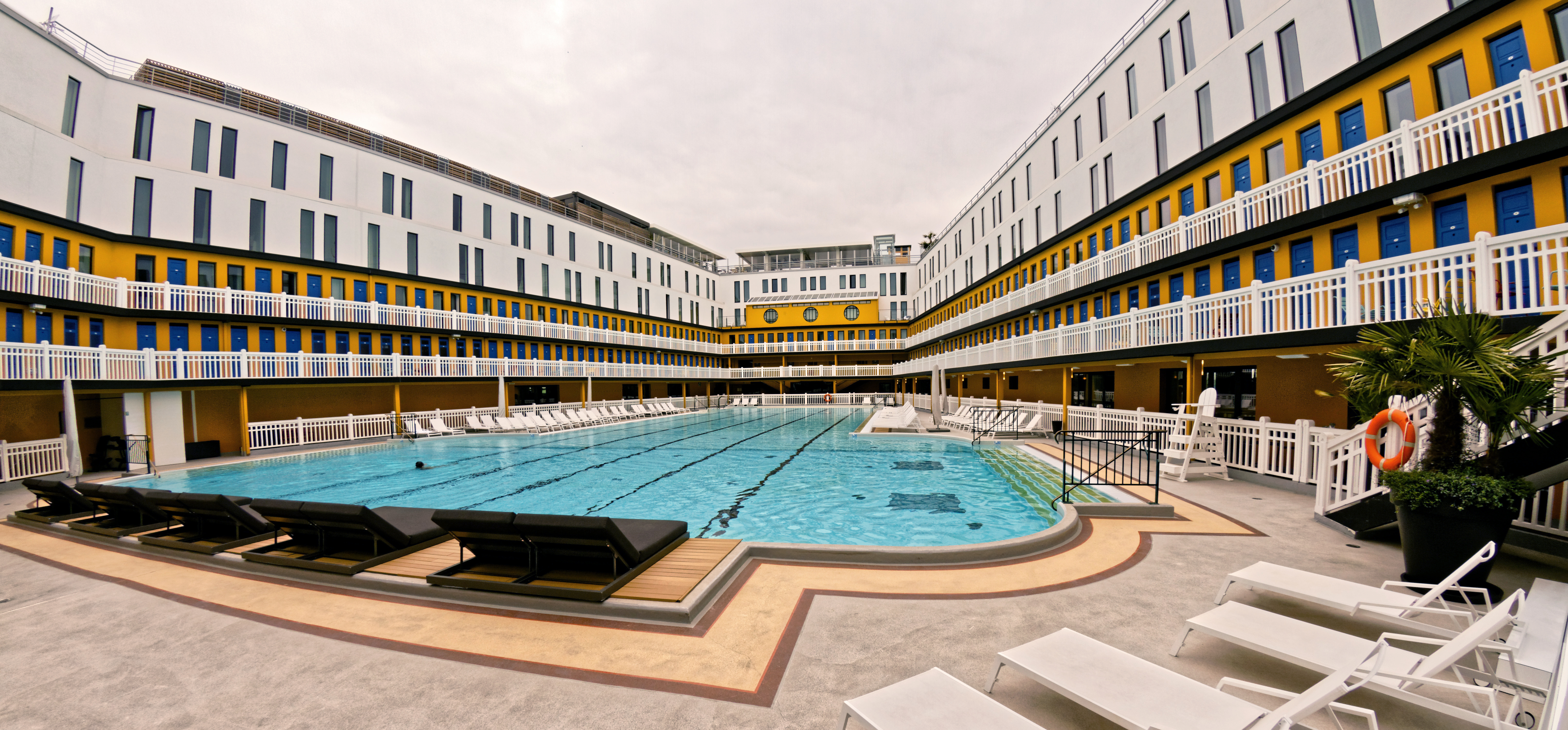
- The pool in 2015
- Interactive map of Piscine Molitor
- Former names: les Piscines Auteuil-Molitor, les Grands établissements balnéaires d'Auteuil
- Location: 4 Rue Nungesser et Coli, 75016 Paris, France
- Coordinates: 48.845144°N 2.252869°E
- Owner: City of Paris
- Operator: Colony Capital
- Type: One open-air pool, one covered pool
- Dimensions: Length: 33 metres (108 ft) indoor, 50 metres (160 ft) outdoor

Construction
- Opened: 1929
- Closed: 1989
- Architect: Lucien Pollet

Website
- Official website

Piscine Molitor (English: Miller Swimming Pool, French pronunciation: [pisin molitɔʁ]; also known as the Piscines Auteuil-Molitor or the Grands établissements balnéaires d'Auteuil) is a swimming pool and hotel complex located in Porte Molitor, 16th arrondissement of Paris, Île-de-France, Paris, France. It is next to the Bois de Boulogne park, and between Stade Roland Garros and Parc des Princes. The complex was built in 1929 and inaugurated by Olympic swimmers Aileen Riggin, Matthew Gauntlett and Johnny Weissmuller. The pool is known for its Art Deco designs and the popular introduction of the bikini by Louis Réard on 5 July 1946.

The pool was classified as a French monument historique on 27 March 1990, after having fallen into disuse and closing in 1989. The swimming pool complex was rebuilt from scratch in the style of the previous historic design. The new complex includes two pools and a four star hotel. It opened in May 2014.

== History ==
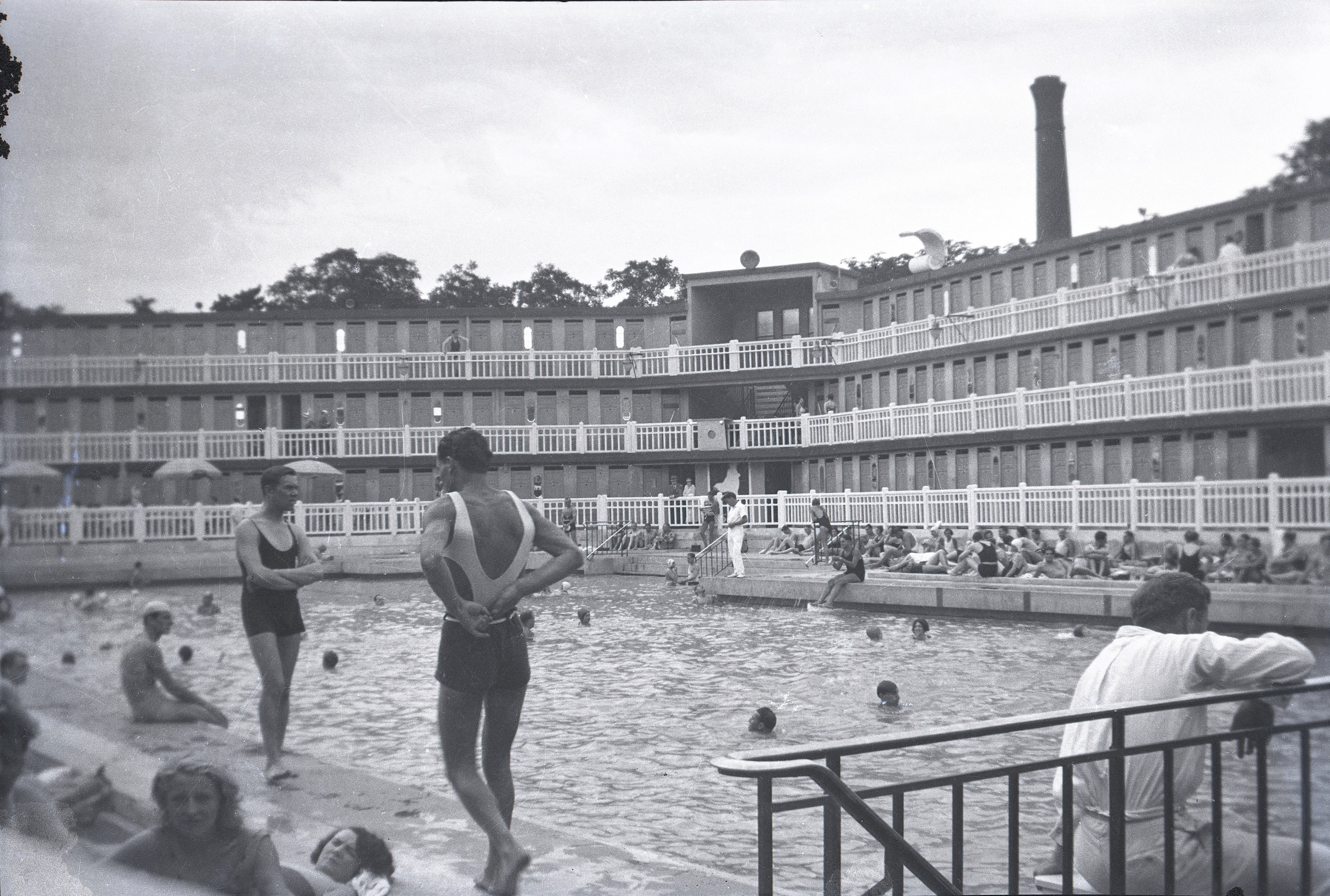
The pool in 1933

From around 1920–1930, Paris saw the construction of numerous new public swimming pools, although the development of aquatic recreation in France still lagged behind that of Great Britain and Germany. However, public pools also hosted bathing facilities, as many French homes did not have their own bathrooms.

Piscine Molitor was built in 1929 by architect Lucien Pollet, who was working for Les Belles Piscines de France and had designed three other pool complexes. It was designed to resemble an ocean liner and was adorned with Art Deco stained glass by Louis Barillet. In the summer of 1929, Olympic athlete Johnny Weissmuller, who was a lifeguard in his spare time, officially opened Piscine Molitor. The pool often housed fashion shows, theatrical performances, and training for figure skating. In 1946, the unveiling of the first modern bikini, designed by Louis Réard, was held at Piscine Molitor, modelled by the Parisian Micheline Bernardini during a fashion show at the pool. The establishment originally comprised two pools, one indoor and the other outdoor, arranged in a T-shape. The complex was used as an ice-skating rink until the early 1970s. The complex ultimately closed in 1989. On 14 April 2001 the French soundsystem Heretik threw a free all-night party gathering inside the pool, hosting about 5000 people.

The complex was the only building with two pools built by Pollet, inspired by the work of architect Robert Mallet-Stevens. Pollet also worked with master glassmaker Louis Barillet, who created the Art Deco stained glass windows adorning the pool complex. It had a conventional 33-metre (108 ft) long covered pool and an Olympic-level 50-metre (160 ft) long open-air pool. The open-air pool was turned into ice and used as a skating rink until the 1970s, and was surrounded by three levels of cabins, resembling a large ship. The complex also included a fitness room. Pollet called the complex "les Grands Établissements Balnéaires d'Auteuil" (the Great Seaside Establishment of Auteuil) because the complex was the site of various sporting events at the time, particularly on the outdoor pool, which was lined with sand. Architect Marc Mimram recently began a restoration project for the pool complex.

=== Building controversies ===
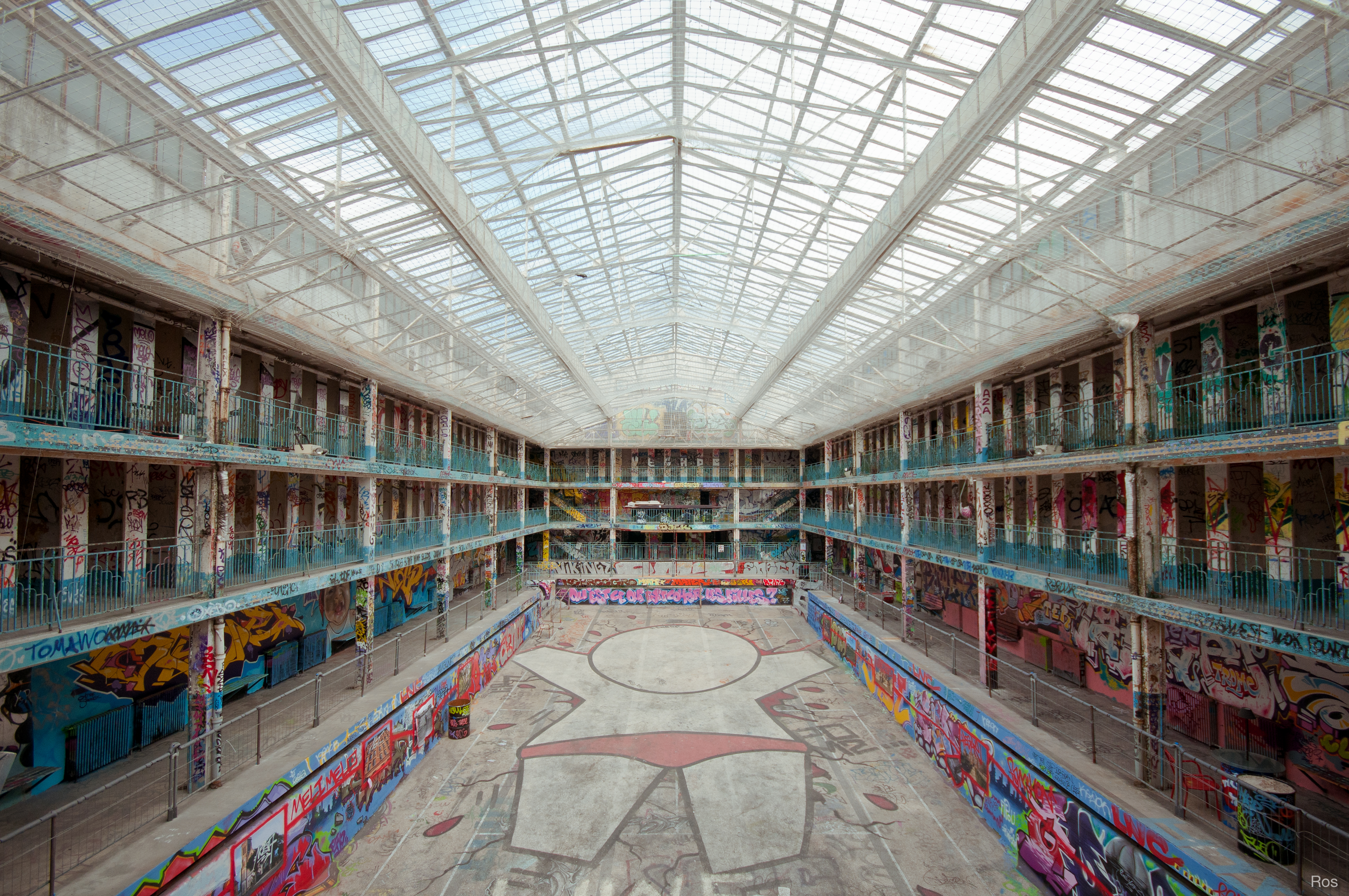
The pool in disrepair, 2011

In 1989, a housing project was proposed to the City of Paris. The project was advanced by the city and called for the destruction of the pool and its rebuilding as part of a hotel, with the rest of the original pool complex being turned into a parking lot. On 31 August 1989 the pool was permanently closed. The next day, the facade and main entrance were boarded up. A group of citizens founded the "SOS Molitor", trying to prevent the pool's destruction. They were successful the next year, with the entire pool complex being listed in the inventory of the French Monuments Historiques program (and, as a result, protected by the French government). However, although saved from impending demolition, the complex experienced damage from weather, poor maintenance, and even vandalism (mainly to its historic Art Deco decor) after being protected.

Various other housing projects were also stopped by the French Ministry of Culture, with their final decision on 5 August 2000 revoking the construction permit originally granted by the City of Paris. After SOS Molitor gained ownership of the complex, a new organization called Piscines Molitor was created to obtain funding for the rehabilitation and reopening of Piscine Molitor. The organization has appealed to the administrative court of Paris.

=== Redevelopment ===
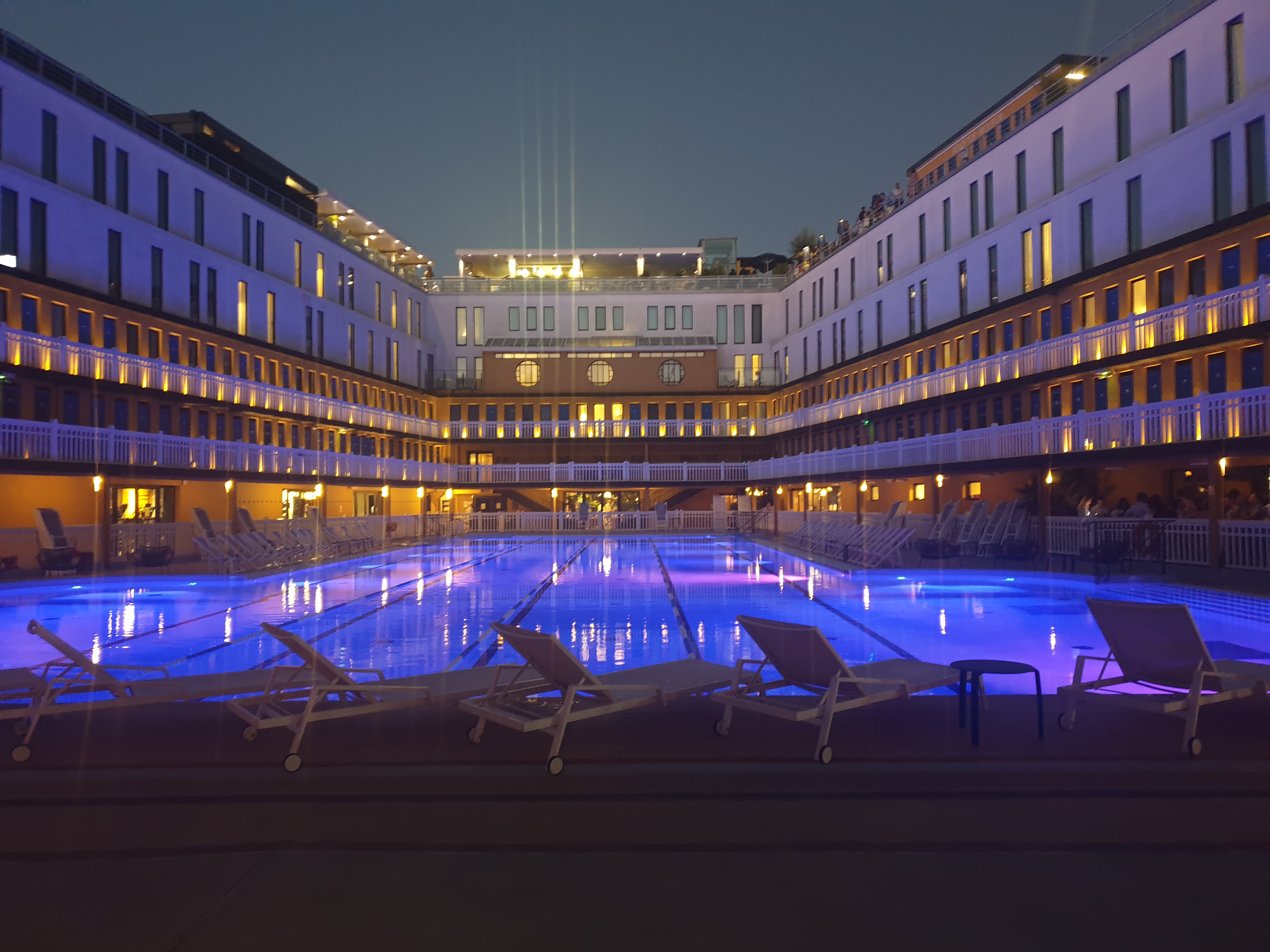
The redeveloped pool at nighttime, 2022

In August 2007, the Mayor of Paris began to accept applications for the renovation of Piscine Molitor. On 20 November 2007 it was announced that three different groups were competing for the role of renovating the pool complex, Colony Capital, ICADE, and GTM Construction. The mayor, Bertrand Delanoë, called for the revival of the complex without spending taxpayer money. On 30 October 2008 Delanoë announced that the group Colony Capital-Accor-Bouygues had been chosen for the project, with architects Jacques Rougerie, Alain Derbesse, and Alain-Charles Perrot. The group had been planning for a 2012 reopening of the complex, but it opened on 19 May 2014. The €64.8 million project leases the property for 54 years and includes a 4-star hotel, a health center, and a medical center, as well as retail, restaurants, and parking facilities.

== In popular culture ==
The title character of Yann Martel's Man Booker Prize winning novel Life of Pi, Piscine Molitor "Pi" Patel, is named after Piscine Molitor. This book was made into a movie of the same name which was released in 2012.

In the third season of Emily in Paris, the title character (Lily Collins) and her best friend Mindy (Ashley Park) have a cocktail while lounging at the Piscine Molitor.

A visit to the spa and pool is also featured during the third season of Netflix TV show The Parisian Agency: Exclusive Properties.

The music video for Nudes by Claire Laffut and Yseult was filmed at the complex.
