= Micheline Bernardini =

French dancer (born 1927)

- Modeling the first bikini on 5 July 1946 at the Piscine Molitor in Paris
- Born: 1 December 1927 (age 98); Colmar, France
- Occupation: Model

Micheline Bernardini (born 1 December 1927) is a French former nude dancer at the Casino de Paris who agreed to model, on 5 July 1946, Louis Réard's two-piece swimsuit, which he called the bikini, named four days after the first test of an American nuclear weapon at the Bikini Atoll.

== Réard's bikini ==
Designer Louis Réard could not find a runway model willing to showcase his revealing design for a two-piece swimsuit. Risqué for its time, it exposed the wearer's navel and much of her buttocks. He hired Bernardini, an 18-year-old nude dancer from the Casino de Paris, as his model. He introduced his design, a two-piece swimsuit with a g-string back made out of 30 square inches (194 cm^{2}) of cloth with newspaper type pattern, which he called a bikini, at a press conference at the Piscine Molitor, a popular public pool in Paris in July 1946.

Photographs of Bernardini and articles about the event were widely carried by the press. The International Herald Tribune alone ran nine stories on the event. The bikini was a hit, especially among men, and Bernardini received over 50,000 fan letters.

== Later life ==
Bernardini later moved to Australia. She appeared from 1948 to 1958 in a number of revues at the Tivoli Theatre, Melbourne. Footage of her 1946 modelling appearance was featured in an episode of the reality television series Love Lust titled The Bikini, in 2011.

Bernardini posed at age 58 in a bikini for photographer Peter Turnley in 1986.
