= Fellegi =

Fellegi is a surname. Notable people with the surname include:

- Ivan Fellegi (born 1935), Hungarian-Canadian statistician and researcher
- Margit Fellegi (1903–1975), also known as Margit Fellegi Laszlo, American clothing designer
- Tamás Fellegi (born 1956), Hungarian politician, jurist, political scientist, and businessman
