= Catalina Swimwear =

American swimwear brand established in 1907

- Product type: Swimwear
- Current owner: In Mocean Group LLC
- Country: United States
- Introduced: 1907
- Related brands: Cole of California, Anne Cole
- Website: https://www.catalinaswim.com/

Catalina is an American swimwear brand founded in Los Angeles, California, in 1907 as Bentz Knitting Mills. The company was later renamed Pacific Knitting Mills and Catalina Knitting Mills before adopting the Catalina name. During the 20th century, Catalina became a major American swimwear manufacturer and was associated with the development of mass-market swimwear and beauty pageant culture.

Pacific Knitting Mills organized the Miss USA and Miss Universe pageants in 1952 after ending its sponsorship of the Miss America pageant. Catalina is currently part of In Mocean Group.

== History ==
The company was founded in 1907 by John C. Bentz as Bentz Knitting Mills, a Los Angeles manufacturer of underwear and sweaters. In 1912, it was renamed Pacific Knitting Mills and began producing knitted swimwear alongside its existing product lines. Early swimsuits were made from wool knit and followed the one-piece style associated with Australian swimmer Annette Kellerman, who helped popularize more practical one-piece bathing costumes in the United States.

Catalina expanded its swimwear range during the 1920s, alongside other West Coast manufacturers such as Jantzen, as interest in outdoor recreation and fashionable swimwear increased. Its designs included the striped Chicken Suit, the men's Speed Suit and the Ribstitch "S" suit. In 1928, Pacific Knitting Mills was renamed Catalina Knitting Mills. Following the name change, Catalina increasingly used its proximity to Hollywood in its advertising. In the 1930s, the company adopted the slogan "Styled for the Stars of Hollywood" and employed actresses and other film personalities to model its swimwear. Catalina advertising from the period featured performers including Bette Davis, Joan Blondell, Olivia de Havilland, Joan Crawford and Ruby Keeler. By the 1940s, Catalina was also commissioning Hollywood costume designers to create swimwear ranges. Designers associated with the company included Orry-Kelly, Edith Head, Travis Banton and Milo Anderson.

Catalina's association with beauty pageants became more prominent in the early 1950s. The company sponsored the Miss America pageant until 1951, when that year's winner, Yolande Betbeze, refused to pose for publicity photographs in a Catalina swimsuit. Catalina subsequently withdrew its sponsorship and in 1952 organized two rival competitions, Miss USA and Miss Universe, which were held concurrently in Long Beach, California. The inaugural Miss Universe pageant was co-sponsored by Catalina, Pan American World Airways and Universal Pictures.

From 1955, the company operated under the shortened name Catalina. During the following decades, Catalina and Cole of California came under common ownership; by the 1980s, both brands were part of Kayser-Roth Apparel. In 1975, Catalina was acquired by Kayser-Roth, which became part of Gulf & Western that year. Catalina was subsequently sold to Wickes Companies in 1984 and was repurchased in 1989 by a group led by former Kayser-Roth executives, operating under the name Taren Holdings.

In 1993, Catalina filed for bankruptcy and was acquired by Authentic Fitness Corporation, a subsidiary of the Warnaco Group. The brand was combined with Cole of California to form Catalina Cole. In 1994, Catalina began distribution through Walmart stores across the United States, moving the brand further into the mass market retail segment.

In December 2007, Warnaco sold the Catalina, Anne Cole and Cole of California businesses to In Mocean Group, a New York based swimwear manufacturer and importer, in a deal valued at approximately $26 million.

== Current operations ==
Catalina remains part of In Mocean Group, which lists the brand among a portfolio of more than 15 swimwear labels. The company currently markets Catalina as a women's swimwear brand, with sizes ranging from XS to XXL. In Mocean describes its wider business as vertically integrated, covering design, production and distribution.

Catalina-branded swimwear remains commercially available in the United States. Walmart continues to sell Catalina women's swimwear through its online store, alongside labels including Anne Cole and Cole of California.
