= Fred Cole (businessman) =

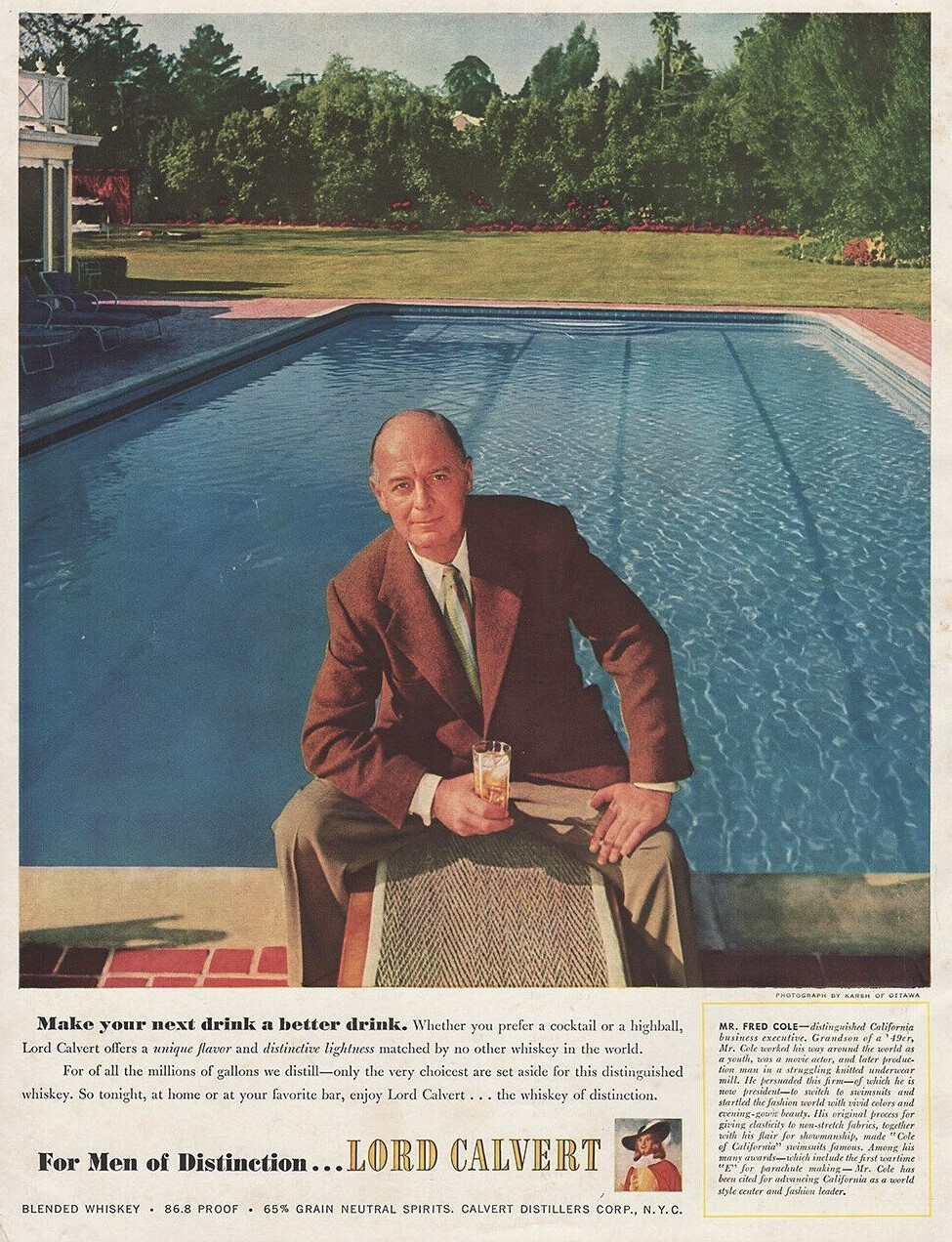
- Fred Cole, photographed by Yousuf Karsh in 1952 for a Lord Calvert whiskey advertisement
- Born: Frederick Cohn; May 21, 1901; Los Angeles, California, U.S.
- Died: September 19, 1964 (aged 63); Los Angeles, California, U.S.
- Other name: Frederick Cole
- Education: University of California, Berkeley
- Occupations: Businessman, actor

Fred Cole (May 21, 1901 – September 19, 1964), born Frederick Cohn, was an American leader in women's swimwear fashions in the 20th century. As Frederick Cole he had a brief career as an actor in silent films before joining the family business, which he eventually transformed into the Cole of California brand.

== Early life and acting career ==
Frederick Cohn was born May 21, 1901, in Los Angeles to Morris Cohn and Edith Armer Cohn. Morris Cohn had established Morris Cohn & Company in Los Angeles by 1890, making men's work clothes. Cohn graduated from the University of California, Berkeley in 1923, but did not immediately join the family business, starting a brief career as an actor in silent movies in 1924 and 1925. As Frederick Cole, he appeared in Secrets of the Night (1924), The Dangerous Blonde (1924), Two-Fisted Jones (1925) and Daring Days (1925). His family disapproved of this career choice, and persuaded him to return to the family businesses.

== Swimwear ==
Continuing to use the name Cole, Fred Cole joined the family's West Coast Knitting Mills company, which made socks and men's undergarments. Cole was uninterested in these products, and used his Hollywood experience and time on the Berkeley swimming team to venture into women's swimwear. Cole's 1925 "Hollywood Swimsuit" featured unheard-of skin exposure in a sleeveless suit with a short skirt, and what was for the time a low neckline. The suit incorporated elastic to hug body contours, and was an immediate success.

In 1936 Cole hired Margit Fellegi, a Hollywood costume designer, as head of design. The same year, Cole began using cotton as the primary suit material in lieu of the traditional wool, along with colorful materials. Cole also popularized white suits, considered daring because they were thought to be potentially transparent. Designer Fellegi introduced new designs, such as the "Swoon Suit," which brought additional popularity. Morris Cohn died in 1941, and Cole, inheriting control of the firm, changed the name of the firm to Cole of California. During World War II the company made parachutes, resuming full swimwear production after the end of the war. Cole's daughter Anne Cole joined the firm in the 1950s and introduced her own lines, eventually spinning off her own company, which developed the tankini in the 1990s.

== Later life ==
In 1957 Cole commissioned Los Angeles architect Harry Gesner to design a house on a hilltop site above Los Angeles that could serve as a background for model shoots featuring Cole of California swimwear, bringing publicity to the house, Gesner and Cole's swimwear line. Cole also had a house in Tahiti, spending six months of the year there.

Fred Cole sold the firm in 1960 to the Kayser-Roth corporation. The Cole of California name survived several corporate acquisitions and is a continuing brand for the Mocean Group.

Cole was married twice, and had four children with his first wife, including swimsuit designer Anne Cole, and Major General Thomas Cole. He died on September 19, 1964, in Los Angeles.
