= Cole of California =

American swimwear brand established in 1925

- Formerly: West Coast Knitting Mills
- Type: Subsidiary
- Industry: Swimwear, fashion
- Predecessors: West Coast Knitting Mills (est. 1917)
- Founded: 1925
- Founders: Fred Cole
- Fate: Acquired through successive owners
- Headquarters: Vernon, California, United States
- Key people: Fred Cole (founder); Margit Fellegi (head of design); Anne Cole (executive vice president)
- Products: Women's swimwear
- Parent: InMocean Group

Cole of California is a swimwear brand, known for innovations in fashionable swimwear.

== Early history and swimwear ==
Established in 1917 by F.L and Joseph Drane in Vernon, California, West Coast Knitting Mills made men's long knitted underwear and socks, quickly becoming the largest knitting mill in the western United States. Apparel manufacturer Morris Cohn obtained an interest in the company in the early 1920s. Cohn's son Fred Cole was attracted to the family business after a time as a silent movie actor, having changed his name to the more marketable Cole and incurred his family's disapproval over his first choice of career. Cole brought his Hollywood experience, and persuaded his family to start a line of women's swimwear. Competing with Catalina Swimwear and Jantzen, Cole in 1925 introduced the sleeveless "Hollywood Swimsuit" with a low back and neckline and a short skirt. Also called a “Prohibition suit”, the new, colorful suit incorporated elastic to hug the body. By the standards of the time, in which swimsuits had sleeves and knee-length legs, the Hollywood Suit was risqué, and immediately popular.

== Popular success ==
In 1936 Cole hired Margit Fellegi, a Hollywood costume designer, as head of design. The same year, Cole began using cotton as the primary suit material, an innovation for the time, when most suits were made of wool. Cole also popularized white suits, considered daring because they were perceived as potentially transparent. Designer Felligi introduced new designs, such as the "Swoon Suit," which brought additional popularity. Morris Cohn died in 1941, and Cole, inheriting control of the firm, changed the name of the firm to Cole of California. During World War II the company made parachutes, resuming full swimwear production after the end of the war. Cole engaged swimmer and actress Esther Williams as a spokesperson to wear Cole products from 1948 to 1952. The firm continued to introduce new styles, including overskirts, tank suits, deeply-cut backs and other innovations. Cole briefly partnered with Christian Dior in Dior's only venture into swimwear. Fred Cole's daughter Anne Cole joined the firm in the 1950s and introduced her own lines, eventually spinning off her own company, which developed the tankini in the 1990s.

== Acquisition ==
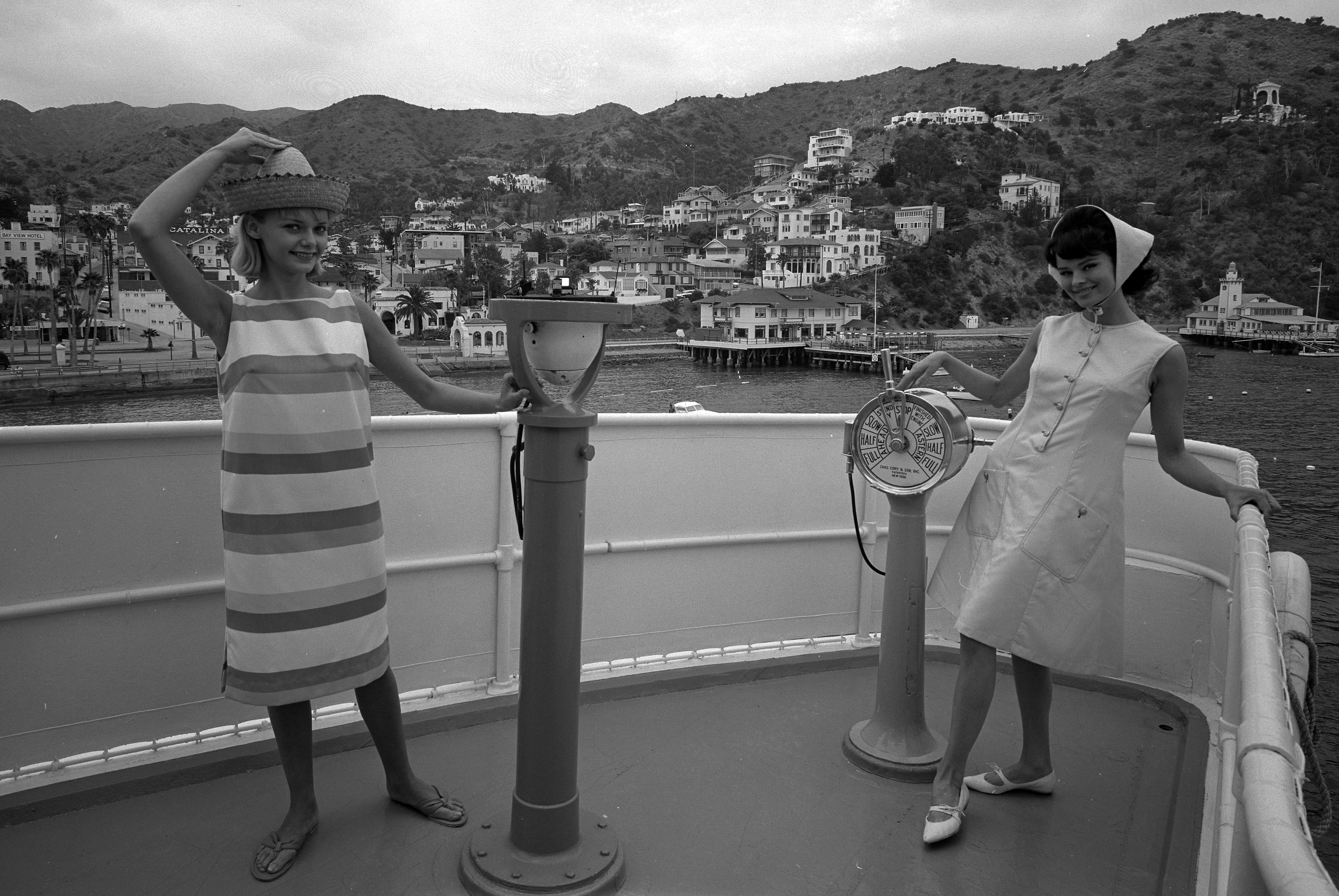
Cole of California shift dresses, 1963

Fred Cole sold the firm in 1960 to the Kayser-Roth corporation, while Felligi stayed on, along with Anne Cole as executive vice president. The "Scandal Suit" was introduced in 1964 with a deep V-neck infilled with mesh fabric and a deeper back. It became the first swimsuit to break $1 million in sales, which happened in 1964. Many of Cole's designs of this era, including the Scandal Suit, are in the permanent collection of the Metropolitan Museum and other fashion design collections.

The firm was again sold in 1993 to Authentic Fitness, which merged Cole with Catalina. Authentic Fitness was acquired by Warnaco, then sold in 2003. The Cole of California and Catalina brands are owned by the InMocean Group.
