= Two-Fisted Jones =

1925 film directed by Edward Sedgwick

- Directed by: Edward Sedgwick
- Screenplay by: Scott Darling
- Story by: Sarah Saddoris
- Starring: Jack Hoxie; Kathryn McGuire; William Steele; Harry Todd; Frank Rice; Paul Grimes
- Cinematography: Harry Neumann
- Production company: Universal Pictures
- Distributed by: Universal Pictures
- Release date: December 6, 1925
- Running time: 50 minutes
- Country: United States
- Language: Silent (English intertitles)

Two-Fisted Jones is a 1925 American silent Western film directed by Edward Sedgwick and written by Scott Darling. The film stars Jack Hoxie, Kathryn McGuire, William Steele, Harry Todd, Frank Rice, and Paul Grimes. The film was released on December 6, 1925, by Universal Pictures.

== Plot ==
As described in a film magazine review, Jack Wilbur, hunting a man supposed to be lost, learns of a money lender Bart Wilson's plot to steal Mary Mortimer's ranch. The money lender hires a gang of cattle rustlers to steal the young woman's cattle. The young man ruins this rustling plot. A man who has been identified as the missing person is being married to the young woman when Jack rides up and proves that he himself is the missing man. There is then a new bridegroom for the wedding ceremony.

== Cast ==
- Jack Hoxie as Jack Wilbur
- Kathryn McGuire as Mary Mortimer
- William Steele as Hank Gage
- Harry Todd as Bart Wilson
- Frank Rice as Old Bill
- Paul Grimes as Traitor
- William Welsh as Henry Mortimer
- Frederick Cole as Paul Jones
- Byron Douglas as John Wilbur Sr.
- Edward Burns as Sheriff
- Artie Ortego as Buck Oxford
