= The Dangerous Blonde =

1924 film directed by Robert F. Hill

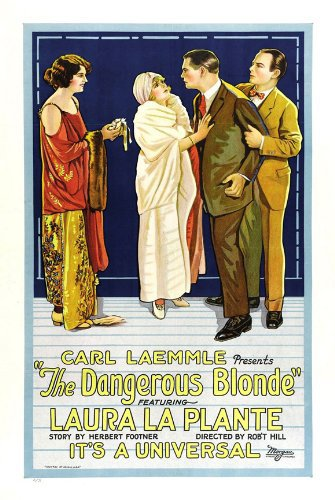
- Directed by: Robert F. Hill
- Written by: Hugh Hoffman
- Based on: "A New Girl in Town" by Hulbert Footner
- Produced by: Carl Laemmle
- Starring: Laura La Plante
- Cinematography: Jackson Rose
- Distributed by: Universal Pictures
- Release date: May 19, 1924
- Running time: 5 reels
- Country: United States
- Language: Silent (English intertitles)

The Dangerous Blonde is a 1924 American silent romantic comedy film directed by Robert F. Hill and starring Laura La Plante. It was produced and distributed by Universal Pictures.

== Cast ==
- Laura La Plante as Diana Faraday
- Edward Hearn as Royall Randall
- Arthur Hoyt as Mr. Faraday
- Philo McCullough as Gerald Skinner
- Rolfe Sedan as Henry
- Eve Southern as Yvette
- Margaret Campbell as Mrs. Faraday
- Dick Sutherland as The Cop
- Frederick Cole as Roger

== Preservation ==
With no prints of The Dangerous Blonde located in any film archives, it is a lost film.
