= Margit Fellegi =

American clothing designer

Margit Felligi
- Born: 1903; Saint Louis, Missouri, U.S.
- Died: 1975 (aged 71–72); Los Angeles, California, U.S.
- Other name: Margit Laszlo
- Education: Chicago Academy of Fine Arts

Margit Fellegi or Margit Fellegi Laszlo (1903 – 1975) was an American clothing designer, notable for her work with Cole of California in swimwear.

== Early life ==
Margit Fellegi was born in 1903 in Saint Louis, Missouri, the daughter of Hungarian immigrants Emil Fellegi and Elizabeth Jilly. She was educated at the Chicago Academy of Fine Arts, where she studied art, as well as dance. She moved to Beverly Hills, California to design and create costumes for movies.

== Cole of California ==
In 1936 Fellegi joined the design staff of Cole Knitting Mills, later known as Cole of California, as head designer. In addition to swimsuit design for Fred Cole, Fellegi created new fabrics that incorporated elastic, giving suits stretchy and clingy properties.Several of these products were patented by Felligi. Other of Felligi's designs were worn by Esther Williams in promotions done for Cole. Fellegi's designs propelled Cole to the forefront of casual fashion design.

In 1943 Fellegi introduced the "Swoon Suit," a two-piece swimsuit that avoided wartime restrictions on rubber use by using side laces. Fellegi worked with structure as well, incorporating foam rubber bras. Later designs worked with drapes and asymmetry. Felligi's 1964 "Scandal Suit" featured a deeply plunging neckline filled with mesh fabric, and an even deeper back line.

Fellegi worked with Cole until 1972. She was married to Aladar Laszlo, a Hungarian immigrant who found work as a writer and actor in Hollywood. They had four children. Margit Felligi Laszlo died in 1975.

== Museum holdings ==
Several of Fellegs designs are included in the permanent collections of major museums, including the Metropolitan Museum of Art, the Los Angeles County Museum of Art, and the Fine Arts Museums of San Francisco.
