= Tankini =

Two-piece woman's swimsuit

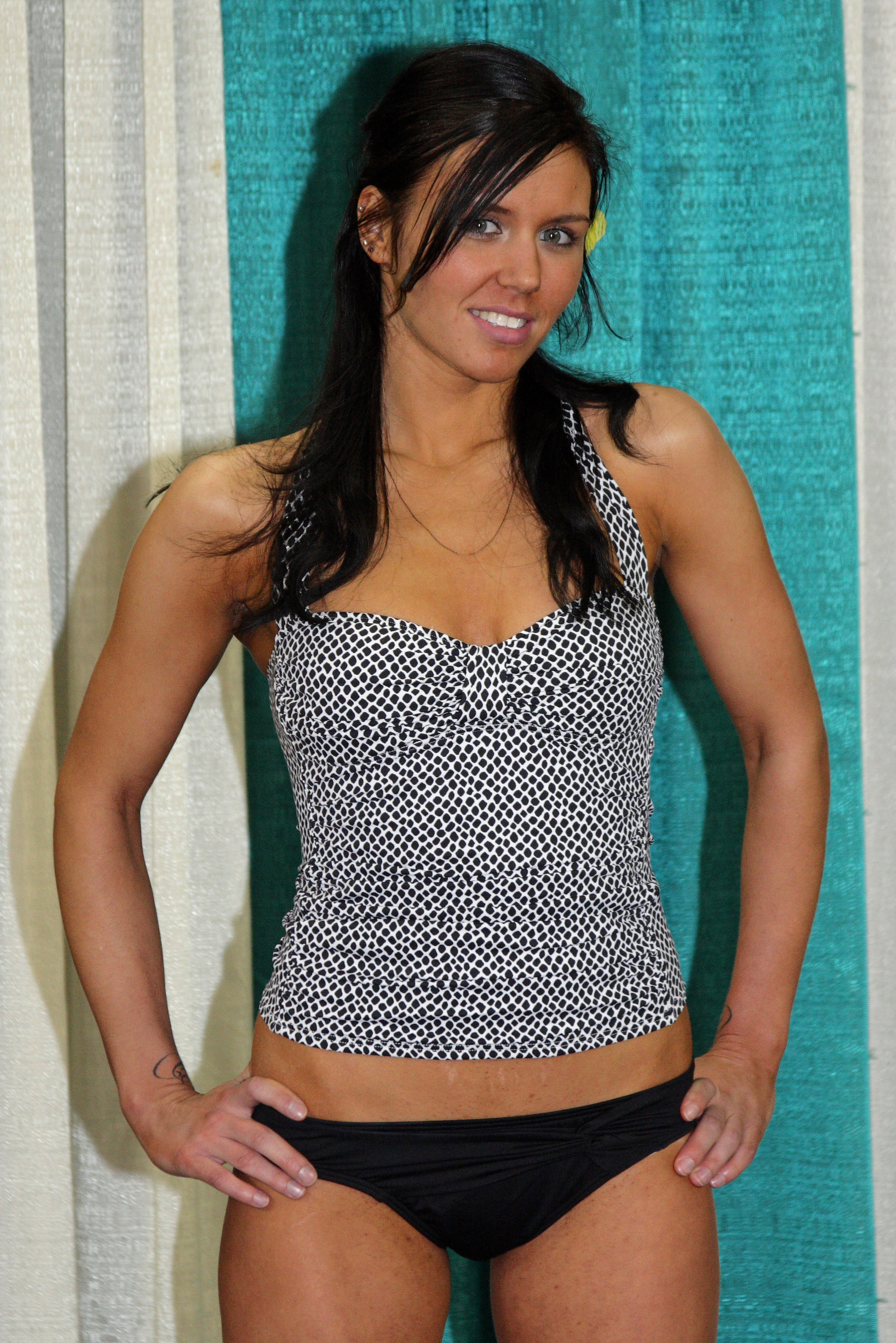
A woman wearing a tankini.

The tankini is a bathing suit introduced in the late 1990s which combines a tank top and a bikini bottom. The tank top is usually a blend of spandex with cotton or nylon. This type of swimwear is considered by some to provide the coverage of a one-piece suit with the convenience of a two-piece suit, as the entire suit need not be removed in order to use a toilet. Tankinis come in a variety of styles, colors, and shapes, and some include features such as integrated push-up bras. It is particularly popular as children's beachwear, and is considered an athletic outfit fit for a triathlon. A tankini allows people to play sports on land and in water with less fear of loosing their tops.

A tank top consists of a sleeveless shirt with low neck and adjustable shoulder straps that vary in width and style. It is named after tank suits, the one-piece bathing costumes of the 1920s that were worn in 'tanks' or swimming pools. The upper garment is worn either by men or women, having a greater variety of models available for women. In men it is usually used as underwear.

== Etymology ==
According to author William Safire, "The most recent evolution of the -kini family is the tankini, a cropped tank top supported by spaghetti-like strings." The tankini is distinguished from the classic bikini by the difference in tops, the top of the tankini essentially being a tank top. The tankini top extends downward to somewhere between just above the navel and the top of the hips. The word is a portmanteau of the 'tank' of 'tank top' and the -kini suffix of 'bikini'. This go-between nature of the tankini has, in turn, given its name to things ranging from a lemonade-based martini (Tankini Martini) to server architecture (Tankini HipThread). The Language Report, compiled by lexicographer Susie Dent and published by the Oxford University Press (OUP) in 2003, considers lexicographic inventions like bandeaukini and camkini, two variants of the tankini, important to observe.

== History ==
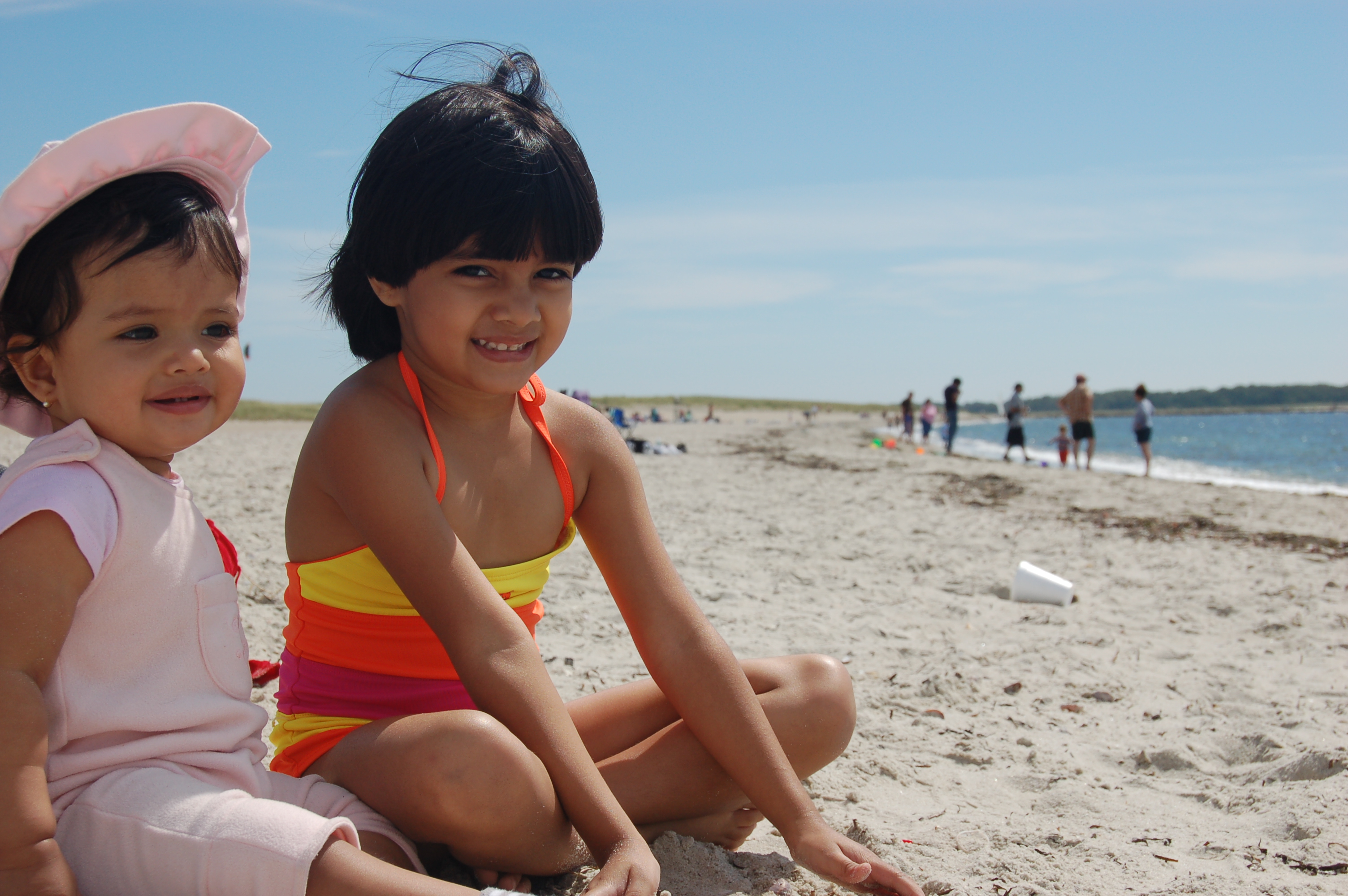
Tankinis are popular as children's beachwear

Tankini and the concept of mix-and-match swimwear were the two major innovations in that genre in the late 1990s. Designer Anne Cole, the US swimwear mogul, was the originator of this style. She was the woman behind the California swimwear label bearing her name, an offshoot of her family's swimsuit company. Called by some the first major innovation in women's swimsuits for decades, Cole's two-piece, which blended the 'freedom' of a bikini with the coverage of a one-piece bathing suit, soon captured nearly a third of the swimwear market. Her tankini, first devised by Cole for herself as a young girl, came out in 1998. Aimed at "closing a gap in the swimwear market, the popularity of tankini largely came from Cole's tapping into women's anxieties about swimwear." In the six seasons following its introduction, tankinis diversified in style and range, variations being offered by designers like Ralph Lauren, Donna Karan, Nautica, and Calvin Klein. In 2005, a controversy broke out when Buddhists complained about swimwear manufacturer Ondade Mar and lingerie company Victoria's Secret marketing tankinis with Buddhist iconography. In the same year, Nike's breast cancer awareness swimwear collection featured four different cuts of tankini.

== Usage ==
Tankinis are suggested as an option for women who have gone through mastectomy, i.e. removal of one or both breasts by surgery, women who have modest bust sizes, and long torsos. In Think & Date Like a Man, fashion writer April Masini suggests the tankini is the most flattering choice of beachwear, with the right amount of coverage along with the feeling of a two-piece suit. A not-too-close-fitting tankini, ensembled with a sarong, has been suggested for gymnophobia or the fear of nudity. Tankinis, sometimes divided in the front exposing the navel, exist for pregnant women.

== Variants ==
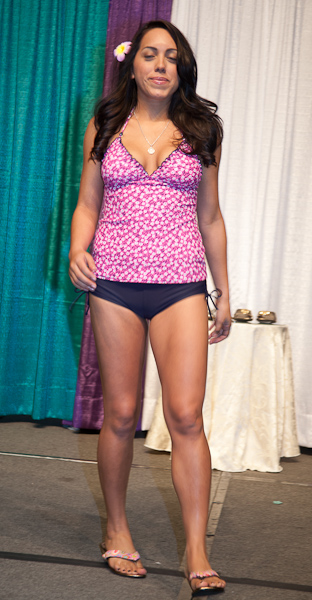
Camkini

Gucci's crystal-studded tankini, on the May 1998 covers of both Harper's Bazaar and Cosmopolitan was as expensive as US$2,425, while bargain tankinis were available at less than US$10. Variations of the tankini have been added by designers and retailers, chiefly Cole of California and Mervyns in the US, to maximize the tankini sales. Fashion guides also suggest tankini-style wedding dresses for brides of certain body types, such as women who are athletic and have long legs.

=== Camkini ===
A camkini is a tankini with the spaghetti straps of a camisole top, over a bikini bottom. Ebony Fashion Fair's traveling fashion show in 2000 presented camikinis as one of the top trends that year. Point Sol, a fashion house, offers higher-waist bottoms and a sports camisole as a more sports-oriented swimsuit style for volleyball and in-line skating.

== See also ==
- Bikini variants
