= Anne Cole =

American swimwear brand

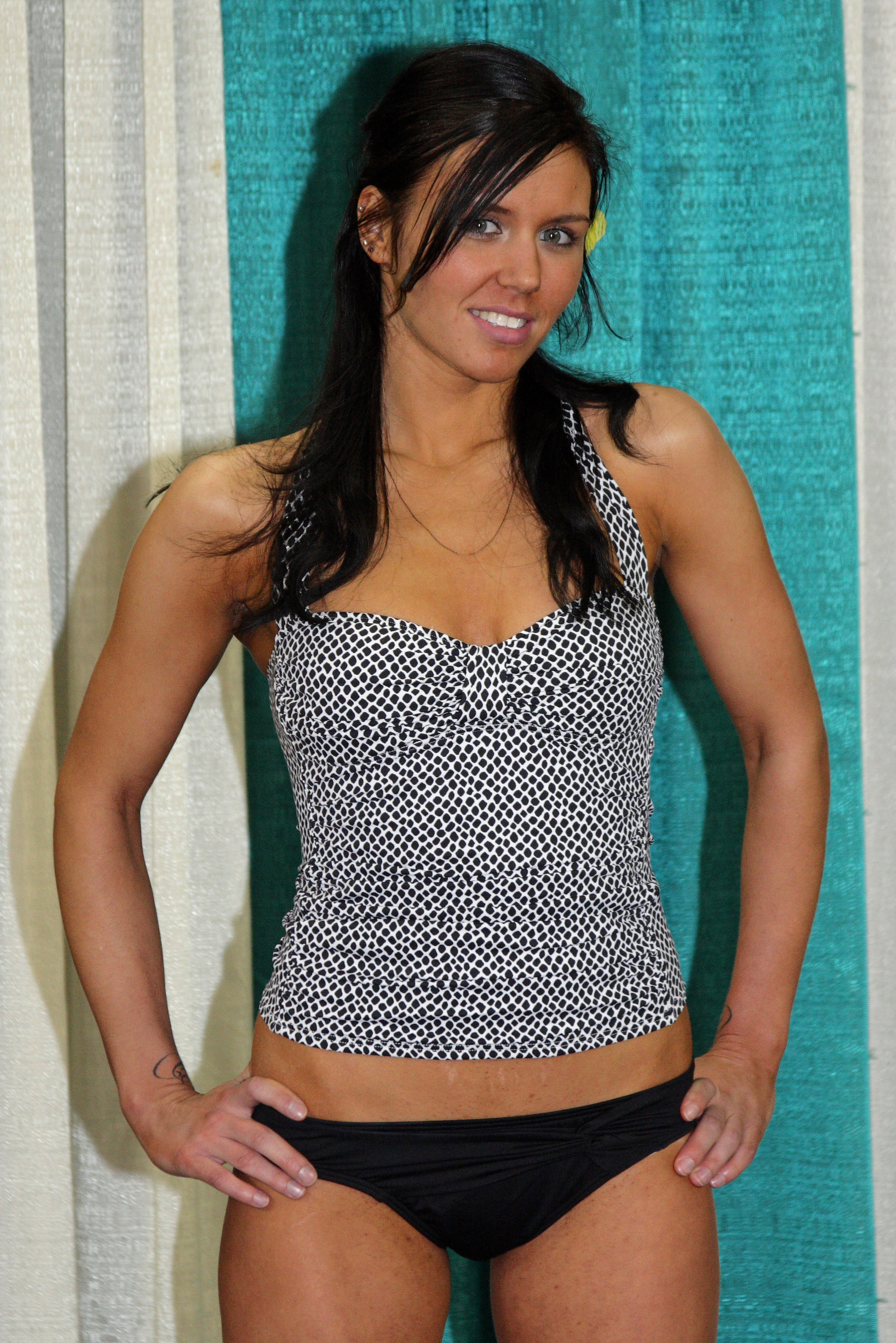
A person wearing a tankini, the invention of which the brand Anne Cole is most known for.

Anne Cole is an American swimwear brand most known for the invention of the tankini, a type of swimsuit. Founder Anne Cole (1926–2017) invented the tankini in 1998.

The swimwear company was originally a division within Cole of California, a knitwear company founded by Cole's father, Fred Cole. Anne Cole began to work for Cole of California in sales and marketing in 1951. During that era, the brand attracted celebrities such as Esther Williams, Elizabeth Taylor, and Marilyn Monroe.

In 1982, after decades of designing women's swimsuits, Anne Cole created her own eponymous swimwear brand, Anne Cole Swimwear. Anne Cole designed several swimsuits for the Cole of California and Anne Cole Swimwear brand, including the “Scandal Suit,” a one-piece swimsuit with mesh inserts that became the first swimsuit to break $1 million in sales in 1964.

Anne Cole introduced the tankini in 1998. The tankini, a two-piece swimsuit featuring a tank-style top paired with a bikini bottom, was designed to provide the coverage of a one-piece with the flexibility and convenience of a two-piece, catering to women seeking both modesty and comfort without sacrificing style. The tankini's success led to a range of derivative styles, such as the camikini, with camisole-like strap, and the bandeaukini, known for its strapless bandeau top.

Anne Cole expanded into ladies’ activewear in 2021 with Anne Cole Active. InMocean currently owns Anne Cole Swimwear.
