= Stephen Rubin =

British businessman (born 1937)

Stephen Rubin CBE
- Born: Robert Stephen Rubin; December 1937 (age 88)
- Education: Canford School
- Alma mater: University College London
- Occupations: Chairman, Pentland Group
- Spouse: Angela Rubin
- Children: 4

Robert Stephen Rubin CBE (born December 1937) is a British billionaire businessman. He is the chairman, and co-owner (alongside members of his family) of Pentland Group, the holding company for a number of sporting goods companies, based in Finchley, north London. As of May 2021, his net worth was estimated at £6.4 billion.

== Early life ==
Robert Stephen Rubin was born in December 1937. After attending Canford School in Dorset, Rubin graduated from University College London in 1958 with a degree in law, with the intention of becoming a barrister.

== Career ==
After he unsuccessfully stood for the House of Commons at Streatham as a Liberal Party parliamentary candidate in 1959, aged 21, he joined the Liverpool Shoe Company, founded by his parents, Berko and Minnie Rubin, immigrants from eastern Europe. He was joint managing director with his father for 10 years until his father's death in 1969, when he took the role of chairman.

Rubin transformed the company, renamed Pentland Group in 1973, into the UK's largest sports apparel and footwear company, owning a number of brands including Berghaus, Brasher, Ellesse, Hunter, Mitre and Speedo, amongst others. It is also the majority owner of JD Sports Fashion plc. Its success largely came from an investment in August 1981, acquiring 55% of Reebok for US$77,500. By 1983/84, Reebok accounted for 70% of Pentland's turnover. Pentland's shares rose from 55p at the start of 1984 to £3 at the end of the year and up to £10 in 1985, while profits rose from £1 million in 1983 to £12.9 million in 1985. Rubin then sold off Pentland's stake in Reebok for US$770m in 1991.

Rubin was chairman and chief executive of Pentland until 1998 when he split his role and appointed his son, Andrew, chief executive, retaining the post of chairman.

Rubin took Pentland private in 1999 to focus on longer-term investments. However, it appears that City institutions were unhappy with the way Rubin was running the company, which had underperformed the market by 40% since it floated in 1989. Rubin served as World Chairman of the Textile Institute from 1994 to 2006. From 1995 to 1998 and again from 1999 to 2001, he was president of the World Federation of the Sporting Goods Industry. He is also a board member of the Brussels-based organization CEJI - A Jewish Contribution to an Inclusive Europe.

In January 2019 he was named by the Sunday Times as Britain's top ranking taxpayer with a tax liability of £181.6m. The following year he was named second on the same list, having paid £143.9m in tax.

In February 2026, Stephen Rubin was listed on the Sunday Times Tax list with an estimated £325.6 million.

== Honours and awards ==
Rubin was appointed OBE in the 2003 New Year's Honours List for services to business and human rights. The International Jewish Sports Hall of Fame honoured him with the 2008 Lifetime Achievement Award. On 21 July 2010, Rubin was awarded an honorary Doctorate of Art (DArt) by Nottingham Trent University.

== Personal life ==
Rubin is married to Angela with four children and lives in London.

According to the Sunday Times Rich List in 2025, Rubin and his family have a net worth of £6.66 billion.
