= Pentland Group =

British textile and footwear company

Pentland Group Limited
- Type: Private
- Industry: Textile; Footwear
- Founded: 1932; 94 years ago in Liverpool, UK (as Liverpool Shoe Company)
- Founder: Berko and Minnie Rubin
- Headquarters: Westminster, London, England
- Area served: Worldwide
- Key people: Stephen Rubin (chairman, Pentland Group); Andrew Rubin (chair, Pentland Brands; deputy chair, Pentland Group); Chirag Patel (CEO, Pentland Brands)
- Products: Apparel; Shoes; Trainers; Sportswear
- Brands: Berghaus; Boxfresh; Canterbury; Ellesse; Endura; KangaRoos; Kickers; Lacoste; Mitre; Red or Dead; Speedo
- Number of employees: 50,000
- Website: pentlandgroup.com

Pentland Group Limited is a British privately held multinational company that owns and invests in retail and wholesale businesses in the sports, outdoor and sports fashion sectors. The company is the majority shareholder of JD Sports, which operates 2,420 stores across 19 countries. Pentland also owns Speedo, Berghaus, Canterbury of New Zealand, Endura, Boxfresh, Ellesse, Red or Dead and Mitre. It is the UK footwear licensee for Kickers and has a joint venture partnership for Lacoste footwear. The company also holds interests in other sectors.

With annual sales of $8 billion, Pentland Group is headquartered in London and employs more than 76,000 people.

In 2017, the Group was awarded the International Institute for Management Development Global Family Business International Award.

== Family-owned private business ==
The company was founded in 1932, when immigrant couple Berko and Minnie Rubin (from eastern Europe) created the Liverpool Shoe Company. In 1959, their 21-year-old son, Stephen Rubin, who had recently graduated from University College London with a degree in law, began working alongside his father as joint managing director.

When Berko died in 1969, Stephen took on the role of chairman. He later became chairman and chief executive of Pentland, remaining so until 1998 when he split his role and appointed his son, Andrew, as chief executive.

The success of Pentland Group can be traced back to August 1981, when Pentland Industries acquired 55% of Reebok for US$77,500 (equivalent to $274,000 in 2025). By 1983/84, Reebok accounted for 70% of Pentland's turnover. Pentland's shares rose from £0.55 at the start of 1984 to £3 by the end of the year, and up to £10 in June 1985, while profits rose from £1 million in 1983 to £12.9 million in 1985. In 1985, Pentland listed 60% of Reebok in a flotation valuing the company at US$300 million (equivalent to $898 million in 2025).

The Rubin family had initially listed their company on the London Stock Exchange in 1964, though still holding a majority of the shares. Following the exponential growth associated with their operation of Reebok, they floated an increased public offering in 1989, then bought back the entire public float in 1999, returning it to a 100% private family-held operation "to focus on longer-term investments". However, according to an article in The Independent, prior to the company returning to a private holding, institutional investors in the City had been unhappy with the way Rubin was running the company, which was underperforming the market by 40% since it floated in 1989. By January 2019, the company had grown to the point where Stephen Rubin, the majority shareholder within the family, was named by The Sunday Times as Britain's top-ranking taxpayer, with a tax liability of £181.6m.

== 21st century acquisitions and growth ==
Pentland Group acquired 45% of JD Sports Fashion plc from its founders, John Wardle and David Makin, in May 2005. Pentland Group is now the majority owner of JD Sports (55%), which has 2,500 retail outlets worldwide, including JD, Scotts, Size, Blacks, GO Outdoors and Millets in the UK.

In 2013, the company reported a 45% drop in pre-tax profits to £62.9m. However, total revenues rose 14.2%, to £1.74bn. Drapers magazine linked this to the Olympics fuelling growth from sportswear brands such as Speedo, although Andy Rubin considered it a return on the company's investment in global growth over the past 10 years.

In 2014, Pentland Group reported a total sales growth of 10% to £1.9bn and reported pre-tax earnings of £85m. Excluding income from its retail investments, turnover rose 11% to £590m, with Speedo delivering a record performance.

In 2015, the Group reported a revenue increase of 14%, to £2.2bn, with Speedo achieving record sales for the second year in a row. From 1 January 2015, Andy Rubin was promoted to Chairman at Pentland Brands plc (a division of Pentland Group plc).

In February 2016, JD Sports Fashion appointed Andy Rubin to its board as a non-executive director. This measure was a precursor to the business increasing its international expansion. In June 2016, Pentland Group announced a 10% increase in sales to £2.4bn. Its rugby-inspired label Canterbury Brands had record-breaking sales, boosted by the Rugby World Cup. Operating profits, before tax and exceptional items, were up 36% year on year, to £220m.

On 15 March 2017 Pentland Brands Limited, a division of Pentland Group, announced it had bought a majority stake in the California-based sneaker brand SeaVees. For the year ended December 2017, Pentland Group recorded total group revenue increase of 25% to £3.6 billion. In January 2018, Pentland Group announced a 50/50 joint venture footwear partnership with the Lacoste Group.

In March 2018, Pentland Brands Limited announced its acquisition of the performance cycling brand Endura. and later that year sold its Ted Baker footwear business back to the Ted Baker brand. Fuelled by a record-breaking performance from JD Sports Fashion, Pentland Group’s revenue soared 38.9% to £5.1bn for the year to 31 December 2018, with operating profits up by 9.3% to £411m. In 2018, JD Sports Fashion bought the US retailer Finish Line and opened 83 new stores, including 78 in international markets.

In December 2019, Pentland Group sold 2.47% of its JD Sports shares for £180m, intended for funding future group acquisitions. With the sale, it remained JD's largest shareholder, controlling 55% of the business. At the time, Pentland Group said it was "committed to remaining a long-term majority shareholder in JD at the same time as growing its portfolio of sports, outdoor and fashion brands through organic investment and acquisitions".

In January 2020, Pentland Group brought the spinoff Speedo USA and Speedo North America back under its Speedo brand by buying it out from PVH for $170 million in cash.
