= VeryFirstTo =

Online retailer

VeryFirstTo was an online business which markets to wealthy individuals with an interest in becoming the first to discover and purchase new luxury products and experiences. The company's website and e-zine showcased newly released desirable items, which are rated by a group of selected celebrity "connoisseurs".

The company is known for selecting outrageously expensive luxury products that draw media attention, such as a $49,000 chocolate Easter bunny with inset diamond eyes, and a two-year travel package to all of the UNESCO World Heritage sites, which was sold for £1million. In 2015, the company attracted media attention for £995,000 Christmas crackers and the "World's most expensive Christmas tree star", which was on sale for £615,000.

== Company history and website ==
The company was founded by Marcel Knobil, the founder of Superbrands, in 2012.

The site is aimed at "'ûber consumers' who are distinguished by their desire to be the first to have the latest products and experiences, and their willingness to pay many times over the normal price." Access to the site is through free or paid-for membership, the latter of which provides access to exclusive privileges.

== List of celebrity "connoisseurs" ==
VeryFirstTo Connoisseurs include:

- Leanne Benjamin OBE (Principal dancer Royal Ballet)
- Joan Burstein CBE (Co-founder of Browns)
- Gurinder Chadha OBE (Director and Producer)
- Tom Chapman (CEO and Co-founder of Matches Fashion)
- Professor Wendy Dagworthy (Royal College of Art Head of Fashion)
- Giles Deacon (Fashion Designer)
- Poppy Delevingne (Model and British Fashion Council ambassador)
- John Hegarty (Founder of Bartle Bogle Hegarty)
- Wayne Hemingway MBE (Co-founder of Red or Dead; Founder of HemingwayDesign)
- Katie Hillier (Jewellery and accessories designer)
- Nadav Kander (Photographer)
- Luke Johnston (Chairman of Royal Society of Arts; former Chair of Channel 4)
- Bip Ling (Blogger; presenter and DJ)
- Zara Martin (TV presenter and DJ)
- Alex Proud (Founder of: Proud Galleries, Proud2, and Proud Cabaret)
- Michael Ward (Managing Director of Harrods)
- Professor Louise Wilson OBE (Course Director MA Fashion, Central Saint Martin’s College of Arts & Design)
- John Mathers (CEO, the Design Council)
- Anouschka Menzies (Founding director of Bacchus)
- Trevor Baylis OBE (Inventor)

== See also ==
- Conspicuous consumption, the spending of money on and the acquiring of luxury goods and services as a public display of economic power, such as the income or of the accumulated wealth of the buyer.
