= Ellesse =

Italian sports apparel company

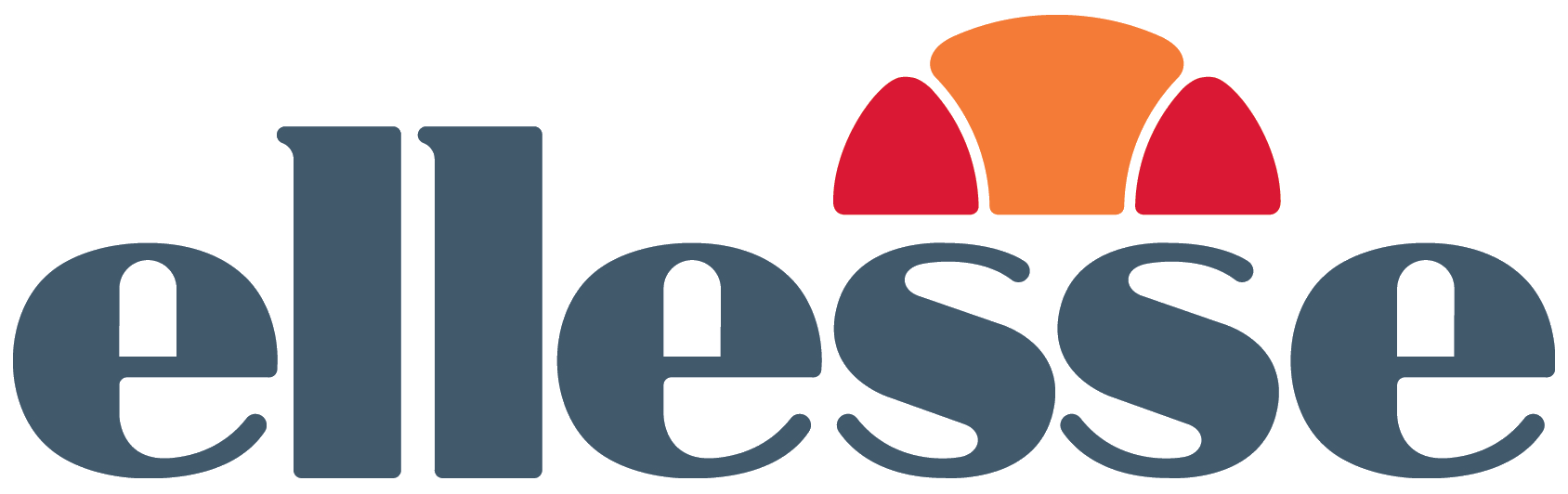
- Type: Subsidiary
- Industry: Sports equipment
- Founded: 19 June 1959; 67 years ago, in Perugia, Italy
- Founder: Leonardo Servadio
- Headquarters: London, England, United Kingdom
- Area served: Worldwide
- Products: Sportswear, footwear
- Parent: Pentland Group
- Website: ellesse.com

Ellesse is an Italian sport apparel company originally founded in 1959 in Umbria, Italy. It has been part of the British Pentland Group since 1987.

== History ==
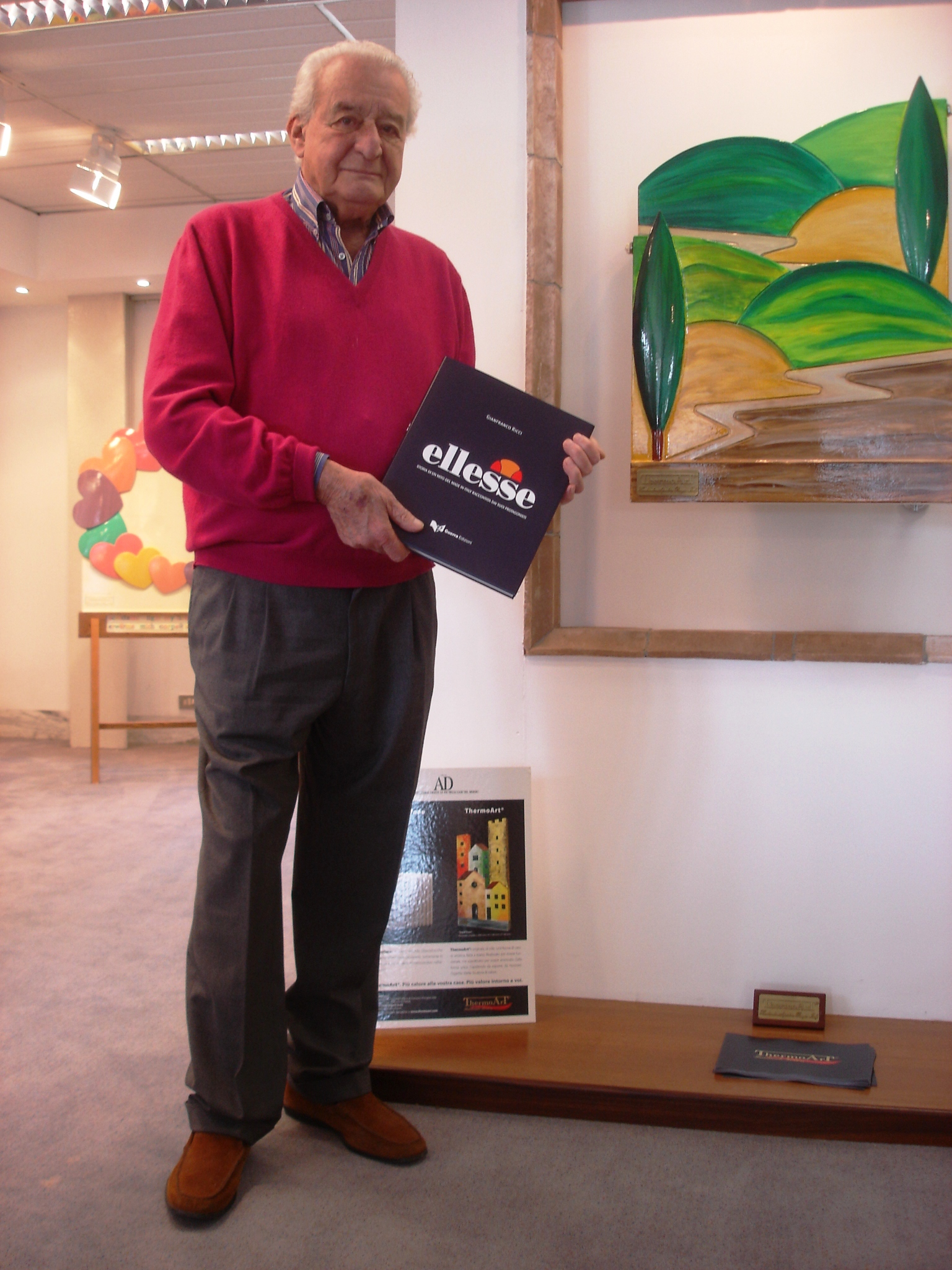
Leonardo Servadio, founder of Ellesse

Ellesse was founded by Leonardo "Mantis" Servadio on 19 June 1959 in Perugia, Umbria, Italy. The name Ellesse derives from Servadio's initials, "L.S.", which are spoken "elle" and "esse" in Italian.

Ellesse grew in popularity during the 1970s as a producer of skiwear, such as quilted jackets and ski pants. In 1979, Ellesse's Jet Pant, a ski pant featuring padded knees and a wide lower leg to fit around a ski boot, was included in an event at the Pompidou Centre in Paris celebrating Italian design.

Another sport with which Ellesse has been closely associated since its early years is tennis. The Ellesse logo references the form of a tennis ball with the shape of the tips of a pair of skis.

Through the 1970s and 1980s, Ellesse gained a reputation for combining sportswear functionality with street-level fashion styling. It was one of the first sportswear brands to feature their logo prominently on the outside of their garments. During the mid-1980s, French designer Jean-Charles de Castelbajac worked with Ellesse, an early collaboration between a sportswear company and a fashion designer. The UK casuals adopted the brand in the 1980s as premium sportswear took off across British lad culture.

== Celebrity endorsements ==
A number of sports celebrities have endorsed Ellesse, including tennis players Tommy Haas, Chris Evert, Guillermo Vilas, Boris Becker, Mats Wilander, Pat Cash, Arantxa Sánchez, Anna Kournikova and Jose Vilela, skiers Marc Girardelli and Jean-Luc Crétier, and Formula 1 driver Alain Prost.

Other celebrities associated with the brand include boxer Muhammad Ali, Natas Kaupas and Maurice Cheeks, and actors Brigitte Nielsen and Roger Moore.

Ellesse also ventured into football sponsorship, and it manufactured the kits for the New York Cosmos in the 1980s.

In October 2021, Ellesse partnered with the YouTube group The Sidemen in a collaboration with their own clothing brand, SDMN.

== Purchase by Pentland Group ==
In 1994, British brand management company Pentland Group purchased 90% of the shares of Ellesse for £20 million. Pentland had been Ellesse's UK distributor since 1981. Servadio retained 10% of the shares.

Pentland Group also owns other well-known sportswear brands, such as Berghaus and Speedo. It currently licenses the Ellesse brand to partners in countries around the world, who manufacture and distribute Ellesse products in their territory.

Ellesse celebrated its 50th anniversary with a party in Rome in July 2009.

== See also ==
- Diadora
- Erreà
- Fila
- Kappa
