= Dunston Staiths =

Coal-shipping structure in north-east England

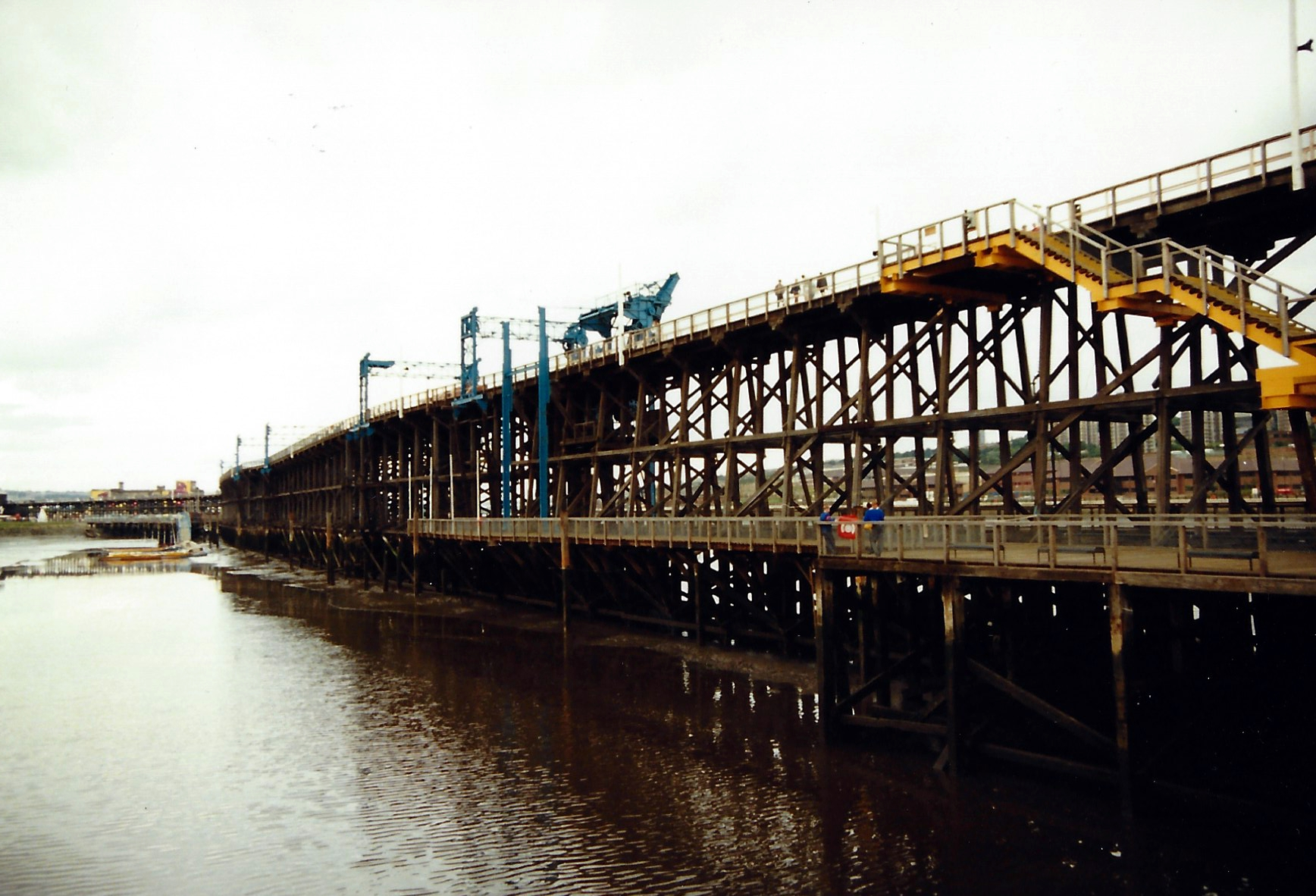
- Interactive map of the Dunston Staiths area

General information
- Location: Dunston, Gateshead
- Completed: 1893

Dunston is particularly known for wooden coal staiths, first opened in 1893 as a structure for loading coal from the North Durham coalfield onto ships. In the 1920s, 140,000 tons of coal per week were loaded from the staiths, and they continued to be used until the 1970s. They were also a shipping point for coke produced at the nearby Norwood Coke Works, as well as pencil pitch manufactured at the Thomas Ness Tar Works using by-products from the Norwood plant and the Redheugh Gasworks. Throughout their working life, motive power for shunting wagons on the staiths and in their extensive sidings known as the Norwood Coal Yard came in the form of locomotives from Gateshead MPD. The staiths' output gradually declined with the contraction of the coal industry, and they were finally closed and partially dismantled in 1980. Now redundant, the railway lines leading to the staiths were lifted, finally allowing the demolition of several low bridges that had become a nuisance to bus operators by limiting the routes available to double-deckers in the area. For many years, the men who worked on the staiths, known as teemers (the men who released the coal from the wagons and operated the loading chutes and conveyors) and trimmers (who had the dangerous job of ensuring the stability of the colliers by levelling the load in their holds as they were filled), had their own room in the nearby Dunston Excelsior Club. For anyone not employed in the club or on the staiths, access to the room was strictly by invite only, and the staithesmen held a reputation for unceremoniously ejecting anyone who fell foul of this rule.

== Garden Festival 1990 ==
The staiths was restored and opened to the public as part of the Gateshead Garden Festival in 1990, following similar events in Liverpool (1984), Stoke-on-Trent (1986) and Glasgow (1988). The Garden Festival was divided into five zones, Norwood, Eslington, The Boulevard, Dunston and Riverside. It was spread over a large area of Dunston and the lower Team Valley, formerly occupied by heavy industries. Though other parts of the Garden Festival site, such as Dunston, (the site of the Norwood Coal Yard), Eslington, (the site of the tar works), and Norwood, (the site of the coke ovens) in the Team Valley, gained an immediate spur for regeneration, The Boulevard was left as a green space. Riverside, which was centred around the staiths and the site of the former gasworks, was derelict and inaccessible for the remainder of the 1990s, although parts of the site have now been developed into new housing.

The staiths are reputed to be the largest wooden structure in Europe, and are protected as a Listed Building and a Scheduled Ancient Monument. In 2002, work began on a development of riverside apartments and houses designed by Wayne Hemingway. Known as Staiths South Bank, this development celebrates the area's heritage as well as improving the setting for the historic structure. In the early hours of 20 November 2003, a section of the staiths was destroyed by fire. In 2005 Gateshead Council commissioned a study into possible options for the Staiths' restoration. The Staiths suffered further fire damage in July 2010. Following the award of a Heritage Lottery Fund grant of almost £420,000, restoration of the structure was planned in 2014 and completed by 2015. It suffered further fire damage in 2019 and on 16 May 2020. The staiths reopened to the public on 11 April 2024, and there are plans to allow visitors on the structure on the first Saturday of each month from May to September 2024. The structure can also be viewed from the riverside walkway, constructed as part of the Staiths South Bank development.
