= Staiths South Bank =

Housing development in Gateshead, England

Coordinates: 54°57′27″N 1°37′41″W

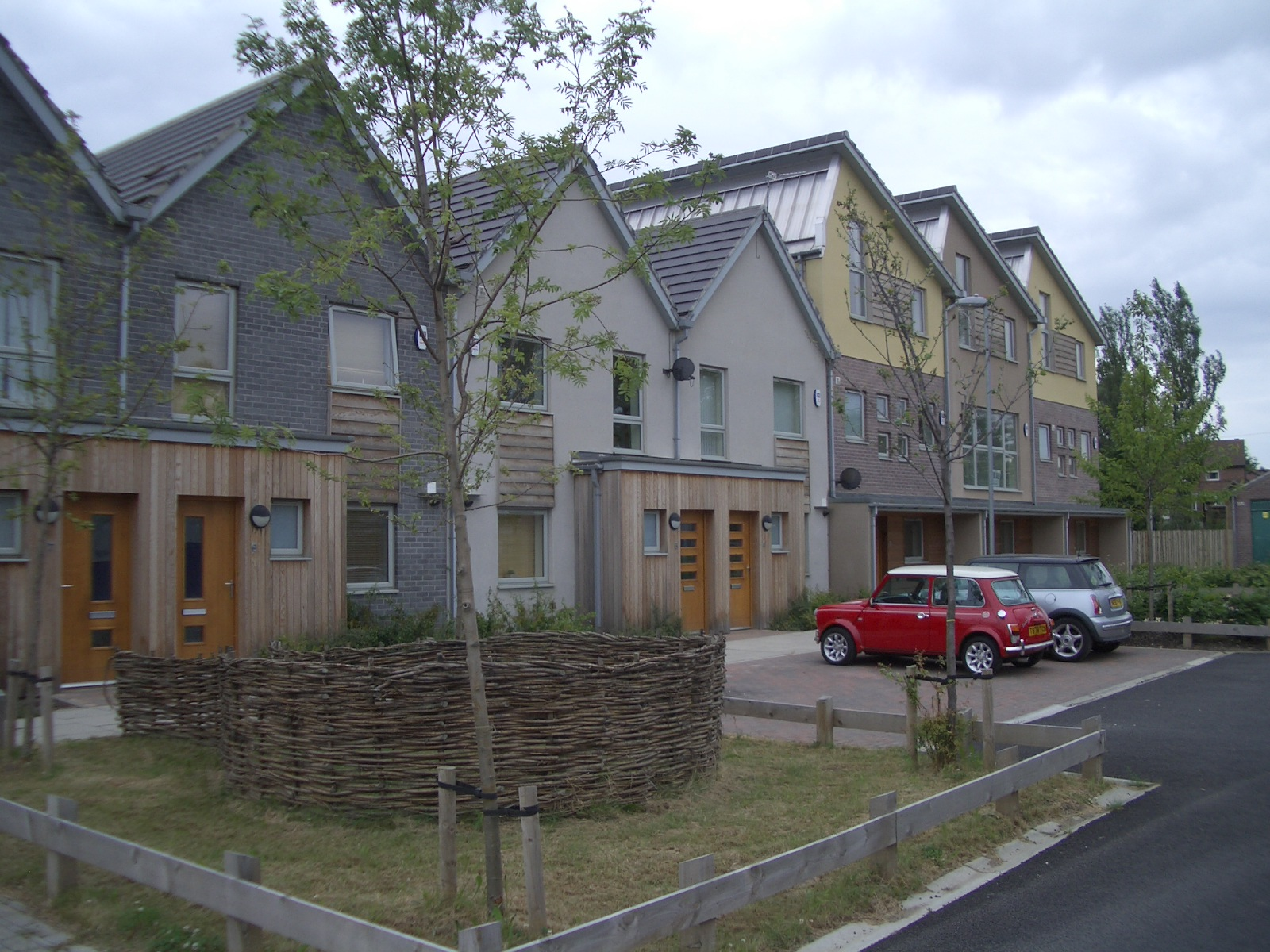

Staiths South Bank is a housing development in Gateshead, England, designed in collaboration with fashion designers Wayne and Gerardine Hemingway (known for their Red or Dead fashion label). It has been cited as an example of "more experimental" design for large housing developments and criticised for excluding cars in a site poorly served by public transport.

== Location ==
This site occupies land adjacent to the Dunston Staiths on the south bank of the River Tyne in Gateshead.

The Staiths is a large, multi-level timber structure built out onto the river on a curved platform, originally built to load bulk materials, (particularly coal), from railway carriages on railway tracks into merchant vessels moored alongside.

The curved shape of the Staiths encloses part of the river to form a protected basin. This section of the river is subject to tidal influence, and the usable basin area therefore varies with the tide. The mud exposed at low tide is an important wading ground for coastal birds.

== History ==
After a long period of industrial use throughout the 19th and 20th centuries, including development of a large gasworks for the production of town gas from coal, the site became disused. In order to regenerate the area, Gateshead Council included the site in the Gateshead Garden Festival, held between May and October 1990.

Remediation for the purposes of the Garden Festival was restricted to regrading and capping in order to provide a suitable medium for planting. This included the use of earth mounding to cover the remaining buried structures, such as gasometer bases.

Following the Garden Festival the site was sold to a subsidiary of the Sir Robert McAlpine civil engineering business. Part of the site was designated an Enterprise Zone in order to encourage new employment uses but repeated marketing over nearly a decade failed to attract any commercial or industrial buyers for the site. Gateshead Council's original intention was that the site would be taken up for a major employment use. Japanese construction equipment manufacturer Komatsu had sponsored the Japanese Garden on the site for the Festival and would have fitted this expectation but concentrated their production capacity in nearby Birtley instead.

After years of lying vacant awaiting a use, a final remarketing exercise was undertaken by local land agents in 1999. This invited offers for any use, with the intention of changing the Council's expectations for an employment use on the site. As a result of this process, the North East region of Wimpey Homes made an acceptable financial offer based on redevelopment of the land for housing.

== Reclamation and redevelopment ==
Initially, use of the land for housing was considered undesirable by the local statutory bodies for two reasons: the Council's continued wish to protect the site for much needed employment in the area and the Environment Agency's concerns regarding the extent and nature of the remaining contamination.

Regarding the protection of the site for a major employer, after almost a decade of marketing and false starts, no employment use was in prospect so this was unnecessarily blocking redevelopment of a significant urban brownfield site. Gateshead Council had been particularly concerned to maintain sites in their area which were large enough to attract a major manufacturing facility. As time went on, the likelihood of such an employer wishing to establish themselves in the area became less and less likely so it became harder for the Council to justify sterilizing the land with an unrealistic intended use.

Regarding the EA's concerns, this needed to be addressed by a comprehensive programme of sampling, analysis and risk assessment prior to designing a reclamation scheme. This was put in motion by Wimpey Homes who assembled a project team to carry out pre acquisition due diligence and pre planning consultation. This proceeded despite Gateshead Council's continuing concerns about loss of employment land until the project team was joined by fashion designer Wayne Hemingway, who brought his personal passion for innovation and skills of persuasion to bear on key members and officers of the Council.

As a result of internal reorganization, Wimpey's interest in the site was then transferred to their newly formed specialist city centre development business, George Wimpey City. While conceptual design work with the Hemingways continued apace, the considerable challenges of achieving a workable remediation scheme were tackled by AIG and Arup in negotiation with the Environment Agency. The central question was whether residential development could take place without removal of all of the underlying contaminated material. After much investigation and testing of the existing ground, a remediation scheme was prepared which removed the isolated hotspots of contamination and cut off pathways from the remaining lower level contamination to the surface and adjoining river, involving a further regrading and capping exercise using clean material imported into the site.

AIG undertook to carry out the remediation with Arup involved in verification of the completed work. AIGs works also included removing many of the large buried obstructions which still remained from the earlier industrial uses and Arup's completion testing included ensuring the bearing capacity of the remediated site was suitable for the intended use. Most importantly, the thickness of the proposed clean capping material was to be measured after being placed to satisfy George Wimpey and Gateshead Council that the work was in compliance with the remediation design.

The twin barriers to development of planning use and contamination are not unusual issues to be overcome for development to take place, however, they were of notable complexity on this particular site and they were only resolved with considerable effort by the professional team involved.

As it happened, neither of these issues were to prove the most contentious barrier to planning consent or implementation, as revealed when the design of the project moved into detailed consultation with the Council.

== Design process ==
Wayne and his wife, Gerardine, complimented the existing professional team rather than replacing any part of it, although there was a change of Architect in order to provide a clean break from previous design studies. There remained a need for a team of housing development design professionals as the Hemingways were concept driven and did not claim to be able to provide detailed technical information which would still be required for regulatory approval and construction.

The project team comprised;

Hemingway Design

IDP Partnership, Newcastle upon Tyne (Architects)

Glen Kemp, Gateshead (Landscape Architects)- note that for the purposes of achieving the desired Homezone, Glen Kemp were given design responsibility for the public realm in its entirety, replacing much of the conventional highway design role

Arup, Newcastle (Civil and Structural Engineers)

Hall & Partners, Newcastle upon Tyne (Cost Consultants)

As mentioned previously, the sampling, analysis and design for the remediation of the site was dealt with by specialist sub contractor AIG Remediation, with Arup undertaking a parallel role monitoring post reclamation contamination and ground engineering information.

In addition to the design team, a North East Public Relations firm, Cool Blue PR, were engaged by the developers to assist in managing media interest and the production of marketing material.

The Hemingways' approach was to follow European models of large scale housing, in particular the modern design aesthetic of newbuild housing in Malmo and the use of Homezone shared circulation routes mixing pedestrians with vehicles, as practiced in the Dutch Woonerf. At the time, the development was the largest newbuild Homezone in the UK. This was an ironic turn in the development of this style of shared external circulation space, as these were experimented with in Warrington and other English newbuild housing in the early 1970s, before being taken up on continental Europe and developed into the predominant residential street form in the Netherlands.

The Hemingways' conceptual aesthetic and functional ideas were interpreted into a gridlike circulation layout creating horseshoes of around 20 terraced properties backing onto a shared garden space, enclosed & gated to provide privacy and security. These groupings around shared gardens were intended to create a tangible sense of neighbourhood, each grouping and garden being different from the next.

Initial pre-planning consultation with the Commission for Architecture and the Built Environment, (the Government's advisor on architecture, urban design and public space), produced some adverse comments on the 'grid like' street pattern which had resulted from creating these groups of homes. Much time was spent considering whether the grid pattern would be apparent at street level as many of the long vistas were broken by staggers in junctions. In the event, this combination of deliberately blocked long views and a 'busy' public realm design, limited the perception of the overall layout for anyone stood within the Homezone or garden areas.

While the Hemingways' influence was to cover all aspects of the project, Gerardine was particularly effective in selecting external materials which were interesting for both their colour and texture. Research into the durability and cost of the proposed materials was often inconclusive as not only were they not already in use for housing construction, they were often not even available in the UK.

Despite the elevational treatments being unconventional, Gateshead Council exerted relatively little influence on these and instead concentrated their comments and concerns on the public realm design, most particularly the Homezone areas. It was these Homezones that became the single most contentious aspect of the scheme, involving frequent meetings of 12 to 15 people, (with representatives from the Council, George Wimpey City and the professional team), solely to discuss how the Homezones could function without compromising safety.

The Homezone, despite being prototyped in the UK in the late 1960s and early 1970s, was at the time alien to most of established highway design practice in the UK. The much evolved and refined Dutch version, the Woonerf, is supported by legislation which gives pedestrians priority over vehicles within these shared streets. This inverts the expectation of UK motorists, who would expect a pedestrian in the carriageway to give way to a vehicle.

Resolving these legislative differences involved the involvement of central Government officers who were already aware of various other Homezone projects around the UK. All of these projects, (whether newbuild or remodelling existing streets), suffered from a mismatch between their design intent to create a higher quality of public realm which could be actively used by residents with the existing legislation that presumed anyone standing in the road was inviting an accident.

The support of central Government included an award of Homezone grant towards the additional costs involved in the creation of a more complex public realm. This grant was specific to external works costs in the first phase of the development so would provide early support for the design principles being established for the project as a whole.

It was only after many months of negotiation and compromise that a workable public realm design was achieved. The key to finally obtaining the Council's consent was the combination of a sophisticated design solution prepared jointly by Glen Kemp and Arup with a management regime prepared by George Wimpey Citynd CPM, the Managing Agents who would act on behalf of residents to maintain the unadopted and communally owned elements of the development.

== Implementation and outcome ==
Once planning consent was obtained, the remediation contract was placed with AIG and work began. The masterplan for the development was divided into phases with the initial construction intended to take place to either side of the new main access off Team Street towards the east end of the site. This access included provision for the dedicated route of the new high speed bus link between Gateshead town centre and the MetroCentre.

As AIG's works moved westwards across the site, their working area was redefined and fenced to allow construction to begin of the initial phase of housing.

The development had received much local publicity during the planning process due to the involvement of the Hemingways. This initial interest from potential buyers enabled an early marketing launch of the first phase of the project, i.e. selling off plan. While this early selling process was becoming the norm for large capital intensive projects which would be attractive to investors, such as city centre apartments, it was not common practice for the sale of family/'estate' housing. This was partly due to a reluctance by developers to commit to selling prices too early in the development programme, thereby losing out on any possible increases either due to inflation or by demonstrating the actual product using an onsite showhome.

The initial sales release was launched at the Marriott Hotel in Gateshead. Such was the interest that had built up, based mostly on press coverage of the Hemingways' involvement, that potential buyers queued for many hours before the evening launch and most of the first release was sold out in a few hours, Sales staff working into the early hours with buyers to complete reservation paperwork. In order to limit the influence of speculators, buyers were restricted to a maximum of two properties each. The success of this initial launch event prompted an early review of selling prices, which were increased for the second release.

The development has won a number of national and regional awards, which include:

- RIBA Housing Design Award 2005 - Best large project
- CABE Building for Life 2005 - Silver Award and Best Residential Project
- Building Magazine - Best Housing-Led Regeneration Project
- Northumbria in Bloom - Silver Gilt Award and Urban Regeneration Category Winner
- RICS North East Renaissance Awards 2006 - Residential Category Winner

Staiths South Bank achieved the highest rating of any large scale scheme in a recent CABE audit.

Despite the acclaim that the development has received from the design community, the complex design and management of the public realm has caused difficulties for the leaseholders. Most obviously, maintenance of such an environment is an expensive operation placing severe pressure on service charges and this has created a tension between leaseholders and the Managing Agents. These remain relatively affordable properties whose buyers may not be willing or able to pay significant additional costs to maintain the estate as a whole.

These maintenance issues are combined with the difficulty of ensuring that vehicles are parked within areas designated for parking rather than obstructing the circulation space within the Homezone. As is often the case, car ownership exceeds that envisaged by the design team so there are more vehicles than allowed for. The usual design/regulatory approach is restrict parking provision to restrict car use, in practice residents tend not to accept this restriction and find space to park wherever they can, preferably as close to their front door as possible. A good example of design and regulation failing to recognise the realities of human behaviour.

The challenge for future Homezone projects is to:

1. Achieve a public realm which is usable for shared circulation and play while being affordable in relation to the ability to pay of the residents/leaseholders.

2. Achieve a workable balance between control of the vehicle to enhance the value of the public realm for non drivers and realistic parking provision.
