= Alexander MacRae =

Australian businessman

- Born: Alexander John MacRae; 25 December 1888; Applecross, Ross, Scotland
- Died: 30 November 1938 (aged 49); Ashfield, New South Wales, Australia
- Occupations: Entrepreneur; Manufacturer
- Known for: Founder of Speedo
- Spouse: Martha MacRae
- Children: 6
- Parents: Murdo MacRae; Mary

Alexander John MacRae (25 December 1888 – 30 November 1938) was a sports entrepreneur and clothing manufacturer. Born in Scotland, he emigrated to Australia where, in 1914, he founded the company that became the swimwear giant Speedo.

== Biography ==
=== Early life ===
MacRae was born in 1888 in Applecross, Ross, Scotland, the son of Murdo and Annie MacRae. In 1910, he immigrated to Australia.

=== Career ===
It was in 1914 that he founded the hosiery company MacRae Knitting Mills in Regent St Sydney, Australia. In 1918, the company moved into a larger factory in Camperdown. The company was growing quickly, which required more space to manufacture what was becoming an icon of Australia. In 1928, a competition was held to see who could come up with a new name for the business. The name "Speedo" was born and it is the company's name to this day. Later, he flew to America and set the business up there.

=== Personal life ===
He married Martha MacRae. They had five sons and a daughter: Alisdair, William, James, Ronald, Duncan, and Jean. All of their sons became directors of Speedo. MacRae died on 30 November 1938, aged 49.
