= Boxfresh =

British fashion label

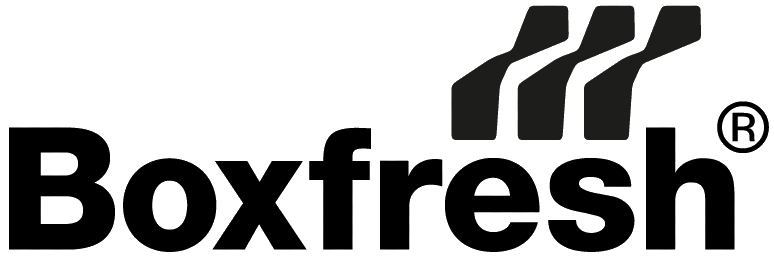
- Company type: Subsidiary
- Industry: Clothing and footwear
- Founded: 1989; 37 years ago, in London, England
- Founder: Roger Wade
- Defunct: 2020
- Area served: Worldwide
- Parent: Pentland Group
- Website: www.boxfresh.world

Boxfresh was a British fashion label founded in 1989 by Roger Wade. The name originated from early hip hop slang for a pair of trainers being "fresh out of the box".

== History ==
The first clothes produced were customised prints on vintage stock T-shirts and were sold on stalls at Greenwich Market and Camden Market, London.

In 1991, Boxfresh clothing started to be sold in Japan and were licensed to the USA in 1995.

In 1992, the first flagship shop was opened on Seven Dials in Covent Garden. Its shop at Shorts Gardens was spread over three floors.

Between 1999 and 2004, the company's turnover increased from £2.5million to over £10million, with its products sold by over 300 retailers in the UK. As of 2004, 20 per cent of the company's output was exported outside the UK.

Known as a 'street fashion' brand, its 2004 'Here and Now' collection was themed around "juveniles, rebels, smoking, kissing, hi rise [sic] flats, hanging out on the street, runaway girls, untamed youth". The company used graffiti-style advertising, including 'graffiti stickers' based on those used by London tagger Solo One, which were freely distributed and widely used by taggers. They subsequently did a deal with Solo One to distribute his stickers with their products. In 2001, Boxfresh used a Zapatista guerilla stencil which was sent to distributors to spread the design. The company has also sponsored dance music events.

In 2005, Boxfresh was acquired by the Pentland Group.

In 2014, to celebrate the company's 25th anniversary, it held a series of events, raves, parties, and exhibitions, and launched the limited edition '25' capsule collection. In early 2015, the company announced that it would cease to produce clothing and would be concentrating on its core footwear products. In December 2015, Boxfresh opened a showroom in Düsseldorf, Germany, which was its most successful territory outside the UK.

The company's London shop appeared in several guides to London's best shops. In December 2020, the label was discontinued after a "challenging year", with a statement on its website leaving room for a possible restart at a non-specified point in the future.
