= KangaRoos =

American footwear brand

KangaROOS
- KangaROO Logo
- Company type: Subsidiary
- Industry: Footwear
- Founded: 1979; 47 years ago
- Headquarters: St. Louis, Missouri, United States
- Key people: Bob Gamm
- Products: Shoes, apparel
- Parent: Pentland Group
- Website: kangaroos.com

KangaROOS is an American brand of sneaker originally produced from 1979 through the 1980s, with a later revival that continues into the present. They were notable for having a small zippered pocket on the side of the shoe, large enough for a small amount of loose change, keys, etc.

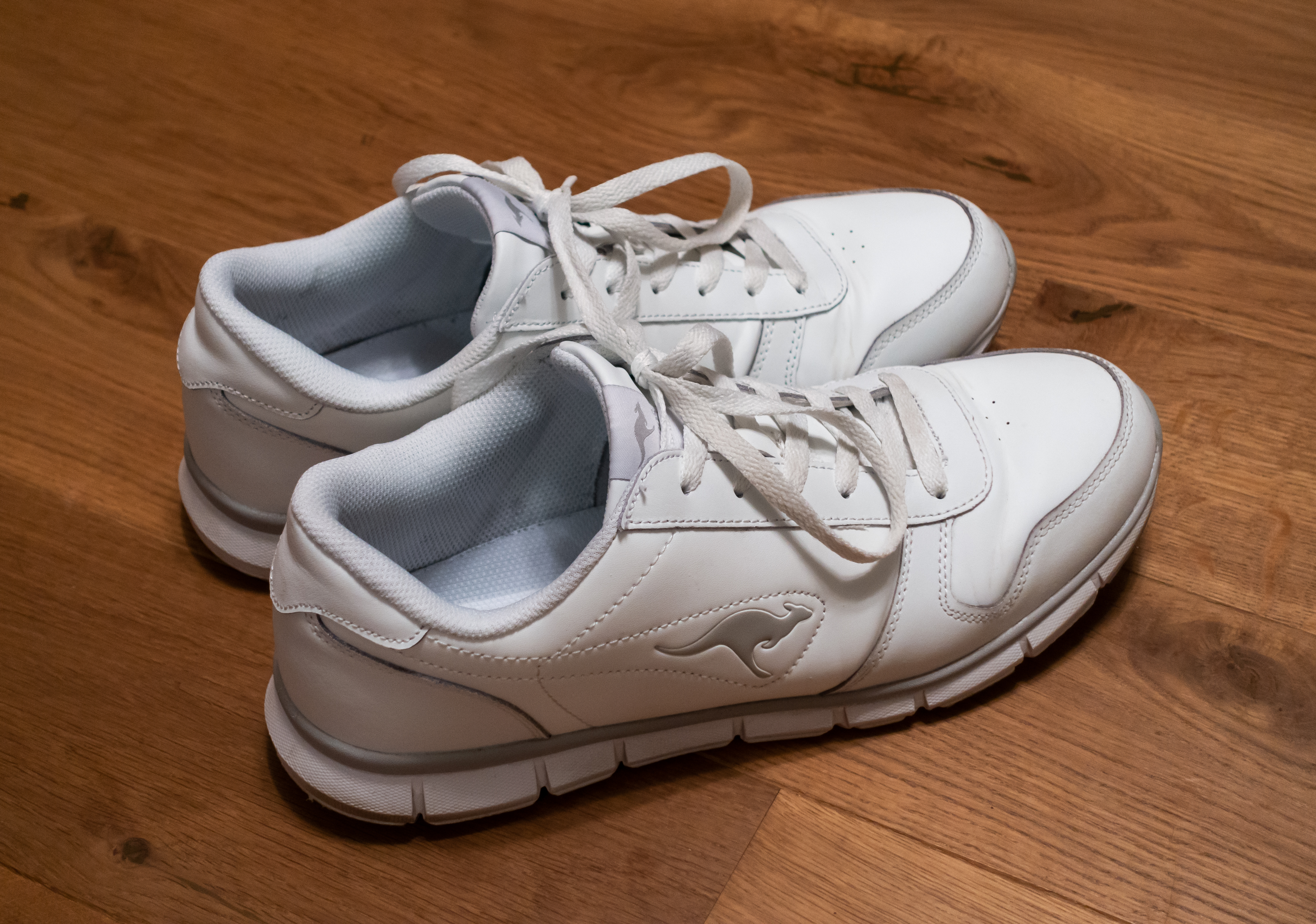
White KangaRoos sneakers

KangaROOS were designed by American architect and jogging enthusiast Bob Gamm. Gamm was a running enthusiast who would go ten kilometers a day, but preferred light athletic clothes without pockets. He designed the sneakers for his own personal use as a place to store his keys and money, then marketed them effectively. His marketing design was successful, leading to sales in excess of 700,000 pairs a month by the early 1980s.

Further refinements on the original design led to several significant innovations in athletic footwear. One such innovation, the Dynacoil, was a patented energy release system designed in the mid-1980s by former Nike designer and KangaROOS VP design Ray Tonkel with consultant Al Gross and tested by NASA. Many other athletic shoe manufacturers would later incorporate similar designs into their shoes. In the early- to mid-1980s many USA professional athletes wore ROOS football and baseball shoes as well as shoes for running and training. Notables included Clyde Drexler (Basketball), Walter Payton, O.J. Anderson, William (the Fridge) Perry (football), Ozzie Smith, Vince Coleman and Ron Darling (baseball), Kenyan, Irish and Welsh track stars as part of Team KangaROOS (running). Jerry Rice wore KangaROOS in his rookie season before switching to Adidas in 1986.

There was a faddish dimension to the shoes, which became very popular among casual athletes and American schoolchildren. Gamm himself remained committed to KangaROOS as serious athletic footwear, and in 1985 he worked with a 10,000-square-meter testing facility called the KangaROOS Laboratory & Gymnasium at the University of Illinois. This allowed for refinement and development of the sneakers for many different sports, including American football, basketball, hockey, tennis, and track and field.

By the end of the 1980s, the popularity of the sneakers was on the decline, executives departed the company and KangaROOS were quietly withdrawn from the market. However, nostalgia, combined with an appreciation of the shoe's athletic design and its ubiquitous pocket, led to a reappearance of the shoe in the late 1990s.

Today, KangaROOS are sold in over sixty countries worldwide. Recent years have witnessed expansion through Central and South America as well as Asia. The footwear moved its strategic focus from performance sports to sports lifestyle footwear. While most still bear the zippered pocket on the side, some now have a side pouch up on the ankle, which can hold a small wallet.
