= Sport Zone =

Portuguese chain of clothing and sports products stores

- Native name: SDSR - Sports Division SR, S.A.
- Company type: Subsidiary
- Founded: 1997; 28 years ago
- Headquarters: Matosinhos, Porto, Portugal
- Parent: JD Sports
- Website: www.sprintersports.com/pt/

Sport Zone is a Portuguese chain of clothing and sports products stores, part of the ISRG group. Launched in 1997 by the Sonae group, this sports retail brand has 97 stores across Portugal.

== Background ==
From 2007 to 2018, Sport Zone sponsored the Porto Half Marathon, a public half marathon event held annually in the city of Porto, Portugal.

In July 2013, Sport Zone launched the Secret Run, a running sports event where participants need to solve puzzles to find out the date, time, and location of the training sessions organized by the brand.

In March 2017, it was announced that Sonae would participate in a joint venture with JD Sports Fashion and JD Sprinter Holdings to create an Iberian sports group. This arrangement involved combining the Iberian Peninsula businesses of these companies with Sport Zone. The completion of this operation signified Sonae's integration into a joint venture aimed at establishing the second largest sports retailer on the Iberian Peninsula.

In January 2018, the merger process between Sport Zone and JD Sprinter was completed. This merger, incorporating Sport Zone with the businesses of the British group in the Iberian Peninsula, led to the formation of the Iberian Sports Retail Group (ISRG). ISRG brought together the operations of four strong brands: Size?, JD, Sprinter, and Sport Zone.

In May 2023, Sonae, along with Balaiko (owner of Sprinter), informed the JD Group of their decision to exercise the Buy or Sell Option, as outlined in the shareholder agreement, aiming to dissolve the partnership between these brands. This decision was prompted by a change in the relationship with the JD Group and a shift in strategic visions.

In July of the same year, the JD Group announced the purchase of the minority stakes of Sonae (29.9%) and Balaiko (19.9%) in ISRG, which the JD Group (holding 50.02%) already partly owned. This acquisition made the JD Group the sole shareholder of the company, now owning 100% of the retail group. Sonae's sale of its 30% stake will result in a revenue of 300 million euros. However, the sale is subject to approval by the JD Group's General Shareholders' Meeting.

As of October 2023, the sale of Sonae and Balaiko's stakes in ISRG was completed, thus ending Sport Zone's history with Sonae and making the JD Group the sole shareholder of ISRG.
