= Fiona Fairhurst =

British designer of the Speedo Fastskin swimsuit

Fiona Fairhurst, born in 1971, is credited with the design of the Speedo Fastskin swimsuit. Fairhurst was a competitive swimmer as a child, giving her some background in the swimming industry. Fairhurst studied MSc textile technology at the University of Huddersfield, BA (Hons) at Leeds University and an MA at Central St Martins, London. At Speedo, she had been working in the role of Product Manager Research and Development, before moving on to the Speedo Fastskin, which has been considered the “silver bullet” in professional swimming and has led to numerous title and Olympic medals.

Fairhurst’s innovation was the Speedo Fastskin suit, delivered by the R&D team at Speedo. As fractions of seconds can determine whether or not a swimmer wins, Fairhurst and her team focused on finding the right material and design for the new Speedo suit. Their goal was to find a material that reduces skin friction in water, and Fairhurst found hydrodynamic animals particularly interesting. In the end, her team zeroed in on sharks as they saw the ridges in their skin as being able to reduce the friction that swimmers would face.

Speedo built a suit with material that mimicked the surface of shark skin and with denticles that patterned the same ridges within a shark’s skin. The Speedo Fastskin debuted at the 2000 Olympics in Sydney, where 83% of the medals were won by swimmers wearing this new suit, and 13 of 15 world records were broken by fastskin wearers.
