= Famous Army Stores =

Famous Army Stores Ltd.
- Type: Limited
- Industry: Retailer
- Founded: 1940s
- Founder: Wilson Family
- Defunct: 2001
- Fate: administration
- Headquarters: Garston, Liverpool
- Products: camping equipment, outdoor clothing footwear and army surplus

Famous Army Stores Ltd. was a major independent retailer of camping equipment, outdoor clothing, footwear and army surplus. It was established as a limited company in 1981 but had been trading since the 1940s. It was based in Garston, Liverpool.

The company had been founded in the 1940s by the Wilson family of Liverpool, whose business interests also included Limocoat, Cathedral Touring Agency and Starways Airline. Highpoint Trading was the parent company for Famous Army Stores and Limocoat, formed as a vehicle for a management buy-out in 1996. The chain then rapidly grew from 100 shops to 200, with a turnover of £50 million and profits of £2.2 million in 1998. However the outbreak of foot and mouth disease plunged the business into losses for 2001, after the countryside was closed and demand for the company's goods disappeared for 7 months leaving the company with a liability of costs for 200 branches and 1,500 employees and negligible income. The company struggled to stay afloat without receiving any government aid and eventually went into administration.

The preferred bidder and eventual owner, Blacks Leisure Group (Blacks), acquired 47 shops and all of the stock for £1.7 million. While Blacks retained all of the staff from the 47 shops, most of the managers left the business as the stores' brands were changed to Millets or Blacks.
