= Footasylum =

British clothing and footwear retailer

Footasylum Limited
- Founded: 2005; 21 years ago
- Founder: David Makin, John Wardle
- Headquarters: United Kingdom
- Owner: Aurelius Group

Footasylum Limited is a British clothing and footwear retailer, mainly selling sportswear-related goods.

== History ==
The retailer was founded in 2005 by David Makin.

In April 2019, JD Sports bought Footasylum, who owned it until the Competition and Markets Authority announced in November 2021 that JD Sports were required to sell the retailer. Both parties had to pay a fine of £4.7 million in February 2022.

As of August 2022, the retailer had 65 stores across the United Kingdom. It remains owned by German asset management firm, Aurelius Group.
