= Berghaus =

British outdoor clothing and equipment brand

Berghaus Limited
- Type: Subsidiary
- Industry: Retail
- Founded: 1966; 60 years ago, in Newcastle upon Tyne, England
- Headquarters: Sunderland, England
- Products: Clothing, outdoor gear
- Parent: Pentland Group
- Website: berghaus.com

Berghaus Limited is a British outdoor clothing and equipment brand founded in Newcastle upon Tyne, North East England, and now headquartered in nearby Sunderland. It was founded in 1966 by climbers and mountaineers Peter Lockey and Gordon Davison, initially as an importer and distributor of outdoors products. Lockey and Davison's outdoor store in Newcastle upon Tyne, went by the name of the LD Mountain Centre. In 1972 they began designing and manufacturing their own products for sale in their shop. They gave their brand the German name 'Berghaus' which translates as 'mountain house'.

Berghaus offers a range of men's, women's and children's outdoor clothing and equipment, including waterproof jackets, fleeces, baselayers and legwear. They also produce a selection of outdoor specific accessories and footwear.

== History ==
Berghaus was founded in 1966 by Peter Lockey and Gordon Davison.

Their specialist outdoor store in Newcastle upon Tyne, England, went by the name of the LD Mountain Centre and quickly gained a reputation for selling high-performance outdoor products from the likes of Atomic Skis, Marker Bindings and Nordica Ski."

=== 1970s ===
The first Berghaus rucksacks were launched in 1970 – the Berg 172 and Berg 272 models had external frames and basic single compartments. These more traditional sacks were followed two years later in 1972 by the Cyclops rucksack – arguably the world's first rucksack with an internal frame.

In 1977, Berghaus became one of Europe's pioneer users of Gore-Tex® fabric, a new waterproof and breathable fabric.

This was followed in 1979 by the development of the Yeti Gaiter, whose distinctive rubber rands were initially made from old tractor inner tubes.

=== 1980s ===
In the 1980s, the Gemini jacket was introduced, and is still in production today; it allowed a walking jacket to have a zip-in fleece.

It was also in the early 1980s that mountaineer Sir Chris Bonington, 'officially' wore Berghaus. It was also around this time that Alan Hinkes – who would go on to become the UK's most successful extreme altitude mountaineer – began working with the company.

In 1986, the Extrem range was launched and included the Trango Jacket. The Attak sole unit was introduced the following year and exported around the world. Berghaus was awarded the Queen's Award for Export in 1988 and the Northern Business Award for Exporter of the Year.

=== 1990s ===
In 1993, Pentland Group PLC, home to sports brands Speedo and Ellesse, acquired Berghaus. In the early 1990s, Berghaus launched its first footwear collection. This collection included the Storm boot, a three-season fabric hiking boot.

As the new century approached, Berghaus introduced the Simplex concept in 1997: the idea was that by minimising the layers of fabric in a garment and eliminating any unnecessary styling, you achieve a more breathable, lightweight product.

In 1999, a new lightweight and packable outerwear was introduced – Gore-Tex PacLite, a waterproof, windproof and breathable range of clothing.

The Nitro rucksack, introduced by Berghaus in 1998, was awarded the Millennium Product Award by the Design Council of Great Britain.

=== 2000s–present ===
==== MtnHaus ====
In 2011, Berghaus announced that it had formed a design and development team called MtnHaus.

The MtnHaus team works with Berghaus-sponsored athletes, such as Leo Houlding and Mick Fowler, to produce kit for specific challenges, which means extended design, development and testing periods. So far the MtnHaus team have produced five products including the Asgard Smock, which went through 18 prototypes before the design was finalised. In 2013, the team developed the award-winning Vapour Storm Jacket.

==== Berghaus-sponsored athletes ====
Berghaus now has a team of over 21 athletes from all over the globe, including:

- Climber Leo Houlding
- Mountaineer Mick Fowler
- Hand biker Karen Darke

Berghaus has a number of shops in the UK, including Bristol, Manchester, Covent Garden in London, Dalton Park in County Durham, Bridgend and Gretna.
