= Hibbett Sports =

American holding company

Hibbett, Inc.

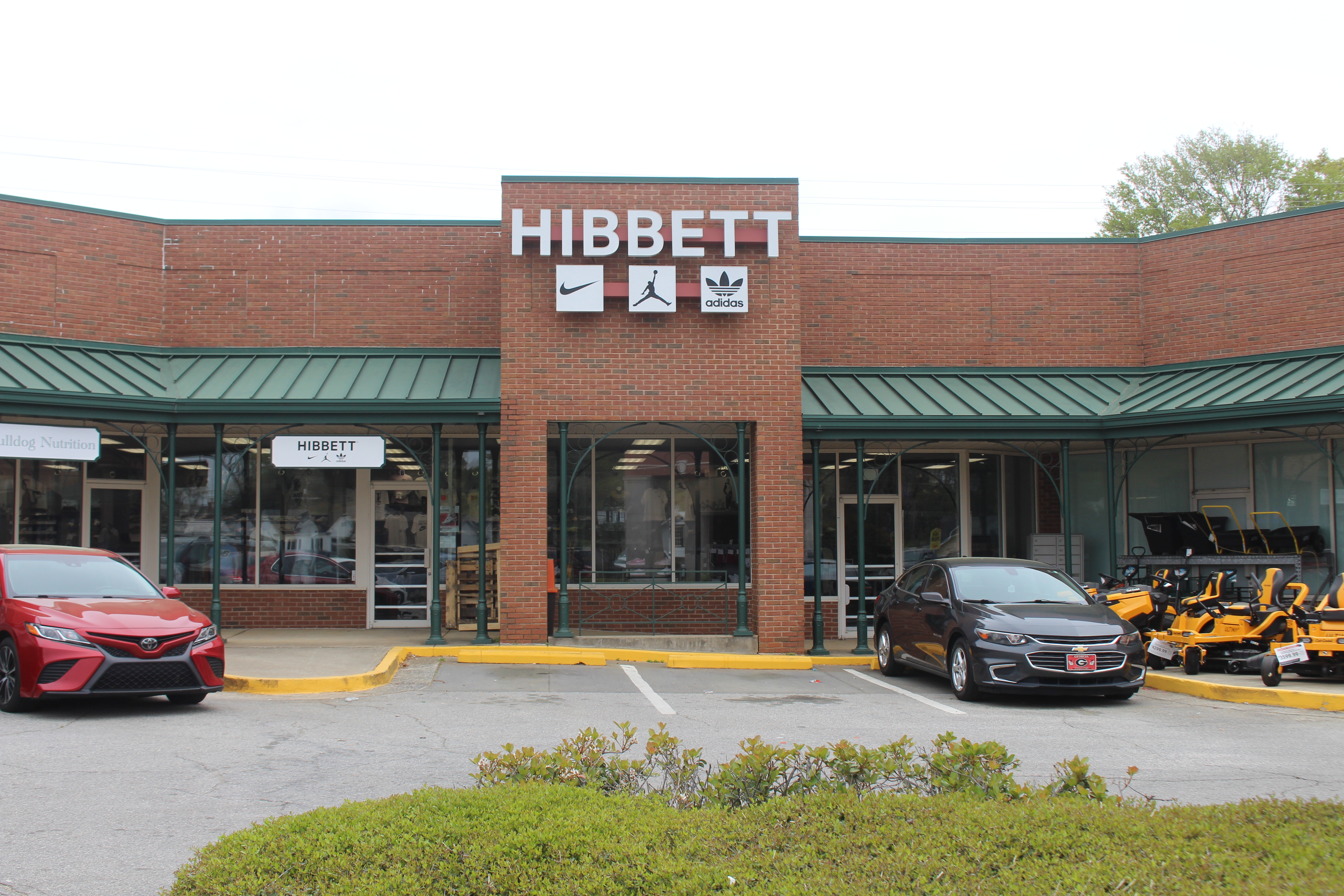
- Formerly: Hibbett Sports, Inc.
- Type: Subsidiary
- Industry: Sporting goods retailer
- Founded: 1945; 81 years ago
- Headquarters: Birmingham, Alabama, United States
- Number of locations: 1,169 (2024)
- Key people: Jared S. Briskin (president and CEO); David Benck (senior vice president General Counsel)
- Products: Sporting Goods
- Revenue: ▲US$1.73 billion (2024)
- Operating income: ▼US$137 million (2024)
- Net income: ▼US$103 million (2024)
- Total assets: ▼US$909 million (2024)
- Total equity: ▲US$419 million (2024)
- Number of employees: 12,500 (2024)
- Parent: JD Sports
- Website: hibbett.com
- Footnotes; Financials as of February 3, 2024.

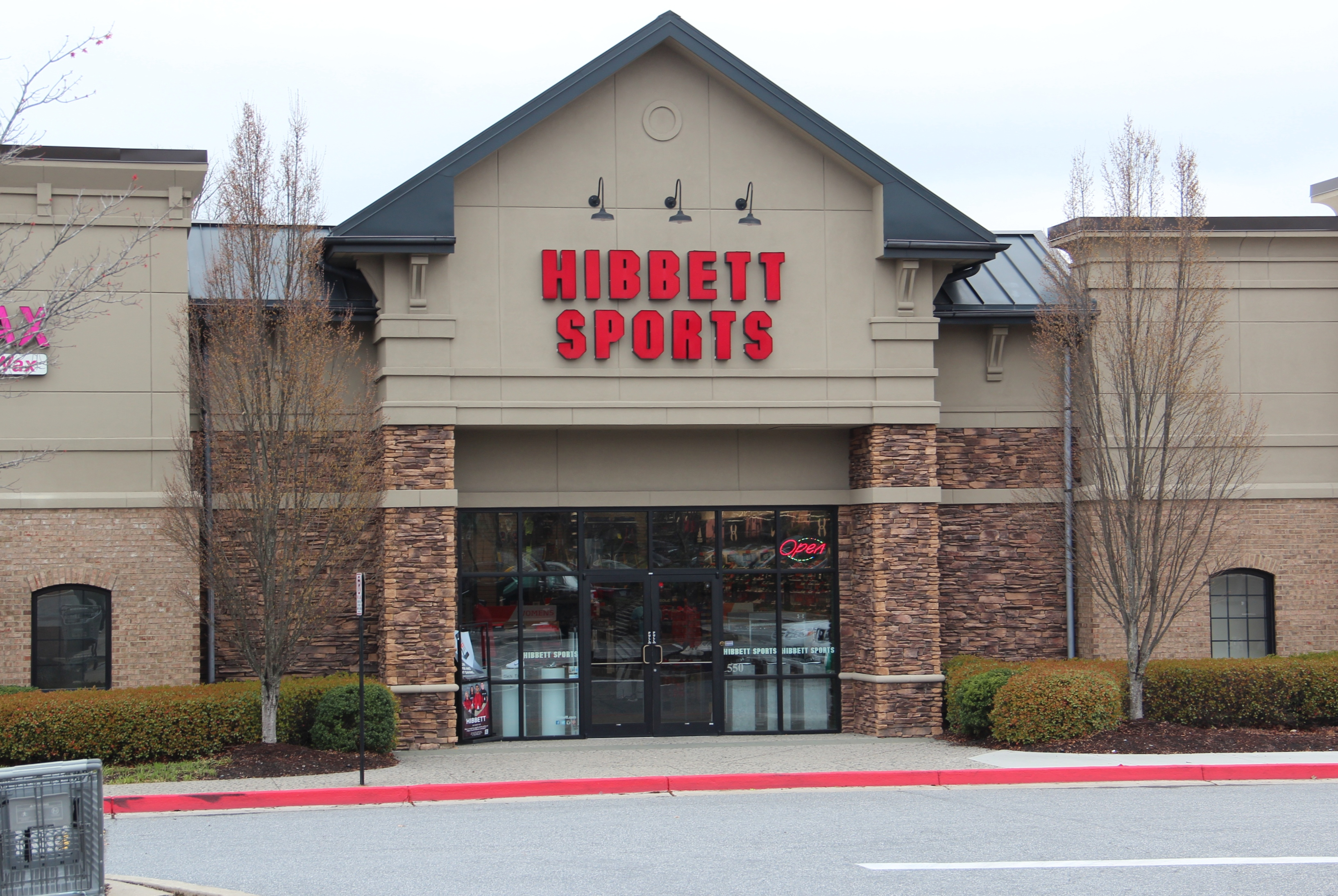
A Hibbett Sports in Johns Creek, Georgia

Hibbett, Inc. (formerly Hibbett Sports, Inc.) is an American sporting goods retailer headquartered in Birmingham, Alabama, and is a wholly owned subsidiary of JD Sports.

As of February 3, 2024, the company operated 1,169 retail stores, which include 960 Hibbett Sports stores, 193 City Gear stores, and 16 Sports Additions athletic shoe stores in 36 states. Hibbett Sports, Inc. operates sporting goods stores in small to mid-sized markets, in the Southeast, Southwest and lower Midwest regions of the United States. States with the most stores are Georgia (97), Texas (97), and Alabama (90). Its stores offer a range of athletic equipment, footwear and apparel. The company's primary store format is the Hibbett Sports store, an approximately 5,000 square foot store located primarily in strip centers which are frequently influenced by a Wal-Mart store.

== History ==
In January 2015, Hibbett Sports reported net annual sales of US$913M on total assets of US$452M.

In August 2017, the company announced the launch of its new e-commerce site, hibbett.com. The website includes product launch calendars, a store availability finder, and fit-finding technology.

UK-based JD Sports agreed to acquire Hibbett for $1.08 billion in April 2024. The acquisition was completed three months later.
