= Wayne Hemingway =

English designer

Wayne Hemingway MBE
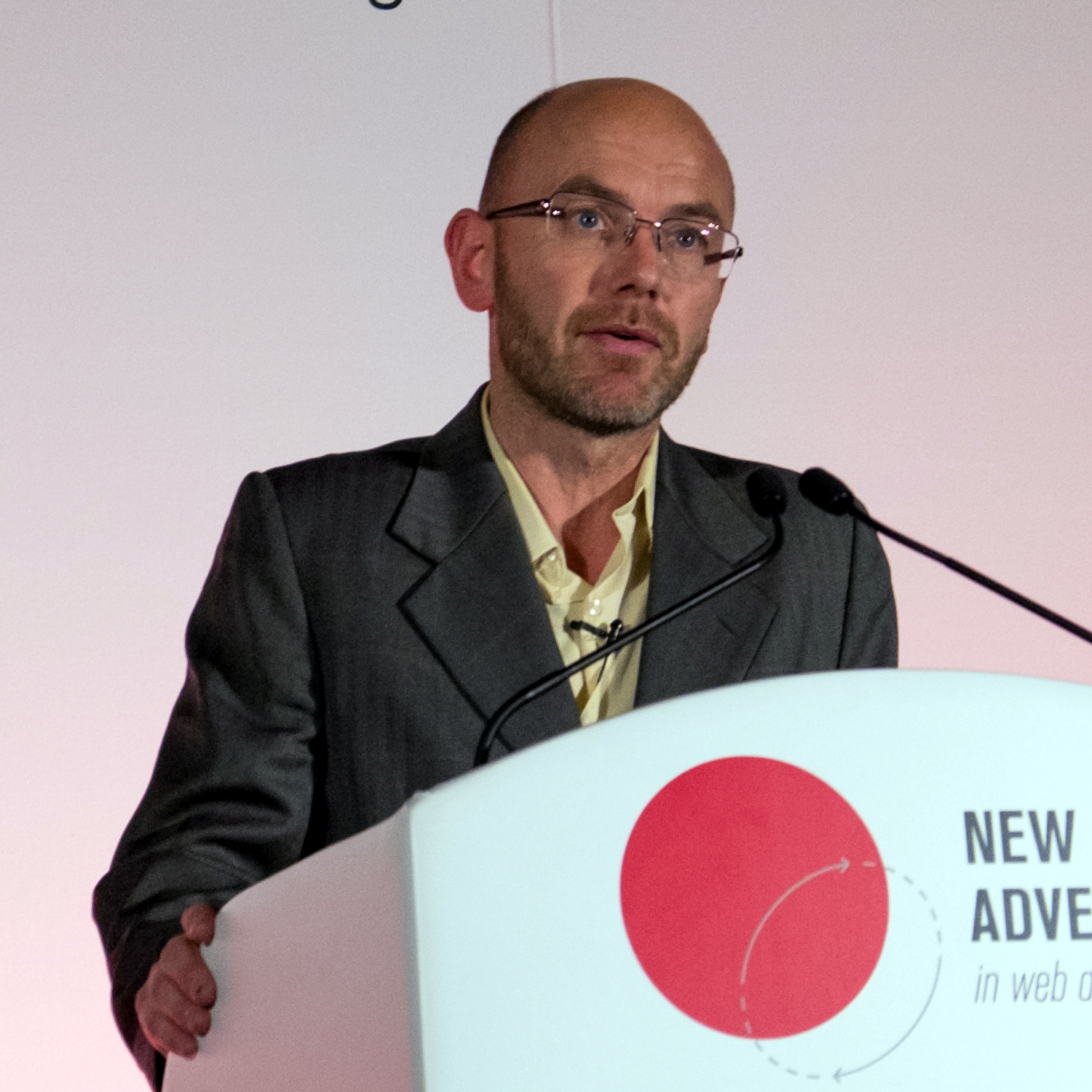
- Hemingway in 2013
- Born: Wayne Andrew Hemingway; 19 January 1961 (age 64); Morecambe, England
- Label: Red or Dead
- Father: Billy Two Rivers

Wayne Andrew Hemingway MBE (born 19 January 1961) is an English designer and co-founder of Red or Dead. He is also on the Design Council Trustee Board and having been with the Commission for Architecture and the Built Environment (CABE) for a decade since its inception (as Chair of Building For Life) is now on the Design Council CABE Committee. Hemingway is a professor in The Built Environment Department of Northumbria University, a Doctor of Design at Wolverhampton, Lancaster and Stafford, a Fellow of Blackburn College and a Senior Fellow of Regent's University London.

== Early life and education ==
Hemingway was born in Morecambe, Lancashire, the son of Mohawk chief and former wrestler Billy Two Rivers. His father left the family and returned to Canada when Wayne was three years old, but the two later resumed contact.

Hemingway's earliest memories are of his mother and grandmother dressing him up as Elvis, a Beatle or Tarzan and being paraded up and down Morecambe pier. His grandfather worked at Grimethorpe colliery as a civil engineer. He lived on Thirlmere Drive and attended Lancaster Road school. He later earned a scholarship at Queen Elizabeth's Grammar School, Blackburn.

In 1982 he completed a Degree in Geography and Town Planning at University College London, and subsequently completed an MA in Fashion at the University of Surrey.

== Work ==
Hemingway started his fashion career by selling items from his wardrobe, and that of his childhood sweetheart (now wife) Gerardine, in Camden Market. It was such a success that Gerardine opened a stall in the Kensington market, selling clothes she produced from a sewing machine on-site.

It was £6 rent for the stall and we took £80 the first day. It just took off from there.

They proved successful, and by the end of the year they had 16 stalls at the market, with shipments of second-hand clothing and footwear brought in from all over the world.

By 1983, they had opened a shop in Kensington, London, selling Gerardine's self-made clothes. That same year, the first Red or Dead collection was also created, inspired by Russian peasant clothing. It was well received and they obtained a large order from the US department store Macy's. Red or Dead stores began to sell Dr. Martens work-wear shoes as a fashion item, and thus began a range of fashion shoes within the stores.

Their Red or Dead brand went on to win the British Fashion Council's Street style Award in 1995, 1996, and 1997.

In 1998 Wayne and Gerardine Hemingway sold the Red or Dead company to Pentland Group a privately held, global brand management company. The sale financed Gerardine's design of their house in Chichester, West Sussex. The house cost around £330,000 to build and furnish (in 2005).

In 1999 they set up 'HemingwayDesign', which specialises in affordable and social design. The highest profile project Homes. the Staiths South Bank, an 800 property mass market housing project on Tyneside for Taylor Wimpey Homes Award has won a series of high-profile awards, including the 2005 Housing Design Award for best large project and Building Magazine's "Best Housing-Led Regeneration Project" and the highest rating of any large-scale scheme in a recent CABE audit. Other major projects include The Bridge Dartford, a development of 1,000 homes in Kent.

He designed the Pure Bug digital radio receiver.

Hemingway has designed beachpods in Boscombe for rent and sale, which raised over £1 million for the local authority.

Hemingway's team organised a cultural event in August 2010, the Vintage Festival. In 2011, the festival took place at Southbank Centre in London, as part of the 60th anniversary of the Festival of Britain (held originally in 1951), and again in 2012. In 2013, the Vintage Festival took place in Glasgow and Morecambe. Hemingway said

We loved visiting Glasgow when we had our Red or Dead shop on Buchanan Street and have always enjoyed visiting Glasgow's Merchant City.

A Vintage New Year was held at Southbank Centre in 2013. October 2013 saw the launch of Vintage presents A Classic Car Boot Sale.

In 2012, Wayne, Gerardine, and the HemingwayDesign team were appointed as designers of the historic and disused Dreamland site in Margate. This included the transformation and branding of the £10m heritage theme park.

In 2012, Hemingway received an honorary degree (Doctor of Arts) from Leeds Metropolitan University.

In 2014, Hemingway's company introduced a new London Underground staff uniform, initially trialled at several stations and train depots before being introduced company-wide in 2015. In the same year, it was announced he was to become patron of The Unite Foundation, a charity providing free university accommodation to young people in the UK from challenging backgrounds.

== Family ==
Hemingway and his wife live in Chichester, West Sussex and have four children - Jack, Tilly, Corey and Beck. They also have a springer spaniel called Minnie.

Wayne is a supporter of Blackburn Rovers and became an Honorary Patron of leading Blackburn Rovers supporters group, The BRFC Action Group, in May 2012.

Hemingway has made several appearances on the Sky Sports 2 TV show Soccer AM.

== Recognition ==
Wayne and Gerardine Hemingway were both appointed Member of the Most Excellent Order of the British Empire (MBE) in the 2006 Birthday Honours, for services to the design and fashion industries.

He was made an honorary Fellow of the University of Chichester in 2009. On 25 June 2014, Wayne and Gerardine were made Honorary Senior Fellows of Regent's University London.

== Bibliography ==
Wayne has also written eight design books.

- Kitsch (20th Century Icons), (Publisher) Absolute Press, 2 December 1999, ISBN 978-1899791972
- Just Above The Mantelpiece: Mass-Market Masterpieces, (Publisher) Booth-Clibborn Editions, 22 November 2002 ISBN 978-1861541949
- Mass Market Classics: A Celebration of Everyday Design, (Publisher) RotoVision, 29 August 2003, ISBN 978-2880467340
- Cocktail Shakers Lava Lamps Tuppe,(Publisher) Rockport Publishers Inc, 28 November 2003, ISBN 978-1592530458
- Home Buyers Guide Counter-pack, The: What to Look & Ask for When Buying a New Home, (Publisher) Black Dog Publishing, 1 July 2004, ISBN 978-1904772125
- Richard Okon: Prefab Publisher, (Publisher) Photographers' Gallery, Nov 2006, ISBN 978-0907879770
- Place to Live (with Gerardine), (Publisher) Quadrille Publishing, 5 September 2011, ISBN 978-1844008193
- The Vintage Fashion Bible: The Complete Guide to Buying and Styling Vintage Fashion from the 1920s to 1990s, (Publisher) David & Charles Publishers, 30 September 2014, ISBN 978-1446304426
