= Finish Line, Inc. =

American shoe retailer

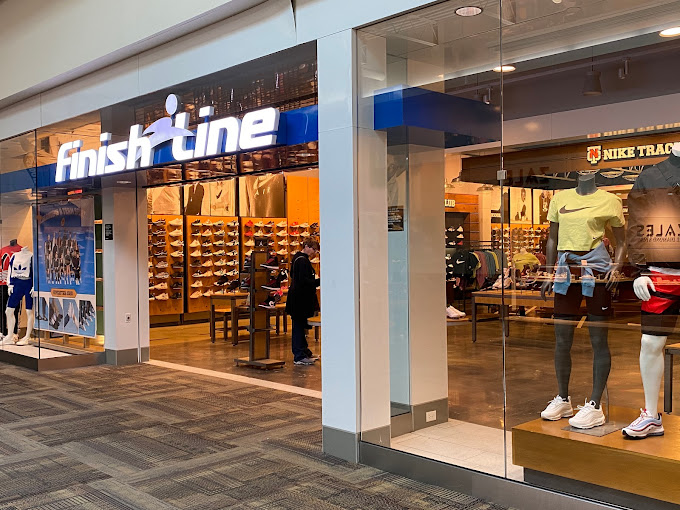
- Finish Line Southern Park Mall, (Moved and was converted to JD Sports in August 2022)
- Type: Subsidiary
- Traded as: Nasdaq: FINL (Class A)
- Industry: Athletic footwear and fashion
- Founded: 1976; 50 years ago
- Founders: Alan Cohen; David Klapper
- Headquarters: Indianapolis, Indiana, U.S.
- Number of locations: 670
- Key people: Sam Sato (chairman & CEO)
- Products: Clothing and shoes
- Revenue: $1.44 billion (2013)
- Number of employees: 10,000+
- Parent: JD Sports
- Website: finishline.com

Previous logo

Finish Line, Inc. is an American retail chain that sells athletic shoes and related apparel and accessories. The company was founded in 1976 and is headquartered in Indianapolis, Indiana. Finish Line operates 288 stores in 40 states and Puerto Rico, mostly in shopping malls; they also operate Finish Line-branded athletic shoe departments in more than 450 Macy's stores. On June 18, 2018, multinational retailer, JD Sports, acquired the company in a merger that paid $13.50 per share in cash.

== History ==
Finish Line, Inc. was founded by Alan H. Cohen and David Klapper in 1976.
