= JD Sports =

British sports-fashion retail company

JD Sports Fashion plc
- Formerly: Flintkiln Limited (1985); John David Sports plc (1985–2002); The John David Group plc (2002–2008)
- Type: Public
- Traded as: LSE: JD. FTSE 100 component
- Industry: Retail
- Founded: 1981; 45 years ago
- Founders: John Wardle; David Makin
- Headquarters: Bury, Greater Manchester, England, UK
- Number of locations: 3,320 stores (31 January 2023)
- Area served: List: Australia Austria Bahrain Belgium Bulgaria Canada Croatia Cyprus Czech Republic Denmark Egypt Finland France Germany Greece Hungary India Indonesia Ireland Israel Italy Latvia Lithuania Malaysia Netherlands New Zealand Philippines Poland Portugal Romania Singapore Slovakia South Africa Spain Thailand United Arab Emirates United Kingdom United States
- Key people: Andy Higginson (chairman); Régis Schultz (CEO)
- Products: Clothing; Sportswear; Accessories
- Services: JD Status
- Revenue: ▲£12,662 million (2026)
- Operating income: ▼£1,035 million (2026)
- Net income: ▼£468 million (2026)
- Owner: Pentland Group (55%); Aberforth Partners (10%); Fidelity Management (5%); Peter Cowgill (former CEO) (1%); Other minor shareholders (29%)
- Number of employees: 59,756 (2025)
- Website: jdplc.com

JD Sports Fashion plc, commonly known as JD Sports, JD or JD Group is a British multinational sports-fashion retail company based in Bury, Greater Manchester, England. It is listed on the London Stock Exchange and is a constituent of the FTSE 100 Index. The Pentland Group owns 55% of the company. The company operates mainly in Europe, North America and Asia-Pacific.

== History ==
The company was established by John Wardle and David Makin (hence the name JD), trading from a single shop in Bury, Greater Manchester, in 1981. The company opened a store in the Arndale Centre in Manchester in 1983. Pentland Group bought Wardle's and Makin's shares for £44.6M in May 2005, so acquiring 45% of the business.

== Acquisitions ==
Early acquisitions of stores included 209 stores with the acquisition of First Sport from Blacks Leisure Group in December 2001 and 70 stores from the administrators of Allsports in October 2005. Subsequent acquisitions of businesses included:

- Bank Stores, which sold fashion clothing, for around £19 million in December 2007
- Champion Sports for €19.6 million in January 2011
- Blacks Leisure Group out of administration for £20 million in January 2012
- the streetwear clothing brand, FLY53, in February 2012
- the brand Tessuti in 2016, later acquired by the Frasers Group in 2022.
- Cloggs, a shoe retailer, out of administration, in February 2013
- part ownership of the Leeds-based trainer retailer, The Hip Store, in May 2014
- Clothingsites.co.uk with its websites, Woodhouse Clothing and Brown Bag Clothing in September 2016
- Go Outdoors for £112 million in November 2016
- the US-based retailer Finish Line for $558 million in March 2018
- the retailer Footasylum for £90 million in March 2019
- Shoe Palace for $325 million in December 2020
- DTLR for $360 million in March 2021
- a majority stake in the online fashion retailer Missy Empire in June 2021
- a majority stake in the Spanish online sports equipment retailer Deporvillage in June 2021
- an 80% stake in the Greek sporting goods retailer Cosmos Sport in June 2021
- the minority stake it did not already own in Polish retailer Marketing Investment Group (MIG) in August 2023
- the French company Courir in September 2023
- the French company Gap in September 2023
- the Iberian Sports Retail Group (ISRG) in October 2023
- Hibbett Inc for $1.08 billion in April 2024

In addition, the company acquired the rugby heritage brands Canterbury and Canterbury of New Zealand as well as The Duffer of St. George and Kooga Rugby brands.

== International operations ==
The company acquired Chausport, which operated 75 small stores in France, in May 2009. It opened its first store in Malaysia in January 2016. The company acquired an 80% stake in the Australian retailer Next Athleisure for A$6.6 million in late 2016. This was followed by the opening of more stores in Australia in April 2017, in South Korea in April 2018, in Singapore in May 2018 and in Thailand in November 2018. The company also acquired 80% of Cosmos Sport, based in Crete, in December 2021 and has launched a joint venture with Erajaya Swasembada in Indonesia with a store opened in 2022. In August 2023, it was announced JD Sports had acquired the remaining 40% of shares in the Krakow-headquartered footwear and clothing retail chain, Marketing Investment Group. JD Sports acquired the first 60% in April 2021. JD Sports opened its first store in Poland in December 2021. In December 2023, Sports Unlimited Retail, JD Sports' Dutch subsidiary, was declared bankrupt. On 10 June 2026, JD North America announced they would be moving their North American headquarters to Fishers, Indiana by the beginning of 2027.

== Structure ==
The company is split into 3 divisions, JD, Complementary Athlesiure and Sporting Goods & Outdoor.

JD hosts these divisions:

- JD Sports
- JD Gyms
- Finish Line
- Size?
- Footpatrol
- Livestock
- Mainline

Complementary Athlesiure hosts these divisions:

Logo for the JD Sports chain

- Hibbett Sports
- DTLR
- Shoe Palace
- Sizeer
- Courir
- Nice Kicks

Sporting Goods & Outdoor hosts these divisions:

- Sprinter
- Tiso
- Sport Zone
- GO Outdoors
- Fishing Republic
- Blacks
- Millets
- Naylors
- Deporvillage
- Cosmos Sport

== Sponsorship ==
In 2017, JD Sports were selected to sponsor the Cymru Premier and the Welsh Cup in Wales. They are also an official supplier and sponsor of association football teams, players, and associations. In August 2008, JD Sports announced sponsorship deals with AFC Bournemouth, Charlton Athletic, Dundee United, Blackpool, Luton Town & Oldham Athletic. On 21 April 2026, JD Sports announced a new sponsorhip agreement with Polish club Wisła Kraków, further expanding the company's portfolio of partnerships within European football.

== Controversies ==
=== Mistreatment of staff ===
The company has been the subject of accusations of mistreatment of its UK warehouse staff, with comparisons being made to Victorian "dark satanic mills" and "prison" conditions in 2016 and 2019.

=== Go Outdoors ===
The company pushed its subsidiary, Go Outdoors, into administration in June 2020. It then bought it back from administrators with the creditors losing much of their money.

=== Alleged breaches of competition law ===
The company along with Leicester City were placed under investigation by the Competition and Markets Authority (CMA) due to alleged breaches in competition law in September 2021. The investigation was in regard to anti-competitive agreements over the sale of club branded merchandise in the UK. Both JD Sports and Leicester City said they were 'fully cooperating' with the CMA.

=== Covert meetings between the Chief Executive Officers of JD Sports and Footasylum ===
After the company acquired Footasylum in March 2019, the CMA carried out an investigation and then, on the basis that the company's ownership of Footasylum might limit competition, ordered the company to dispose of Footasylum. The company and, its subsidiary, Footasylum, were fined a combined £4.7 million after the CEO of JD Sports, Peter Cowgill, allegedly met covertly with the CEO of Footasylum, Barry Bown, on two occasions in July and August 2021 in breach of an order from the CMA not to exchange commercially sensitive information without CMA consent. One of the meetings was alleged to have taken place in a car park in Bury, Greater Manchester.
