= Kickers (brand) =

French clothing and footwear brand

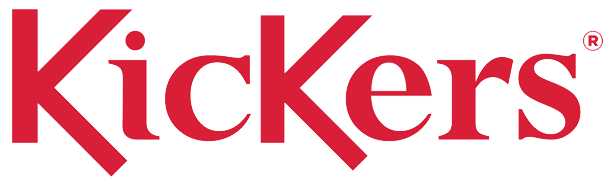
- Type: Private
- Industry: Footwear
- Founded: 1970; 56 years ago in France
- Headquarters: Cholet, France
- Key people: Daniel Raufast (founder); Jacques Chevallereau (designer)
- Products: Shoes, apparel
- Parent: Groupe Royer
- Website: kickers.co.uk

Kickers is a brand created in 1970 in France that produces a wide range of footwear and clothing. Kickers was bought in 2007 by the Royer group.

Kickers are primarily popular amongst British school children, with Kickers 'Lo' style shoes being a popular choice of school shoes for attending secondary school.

== History ==
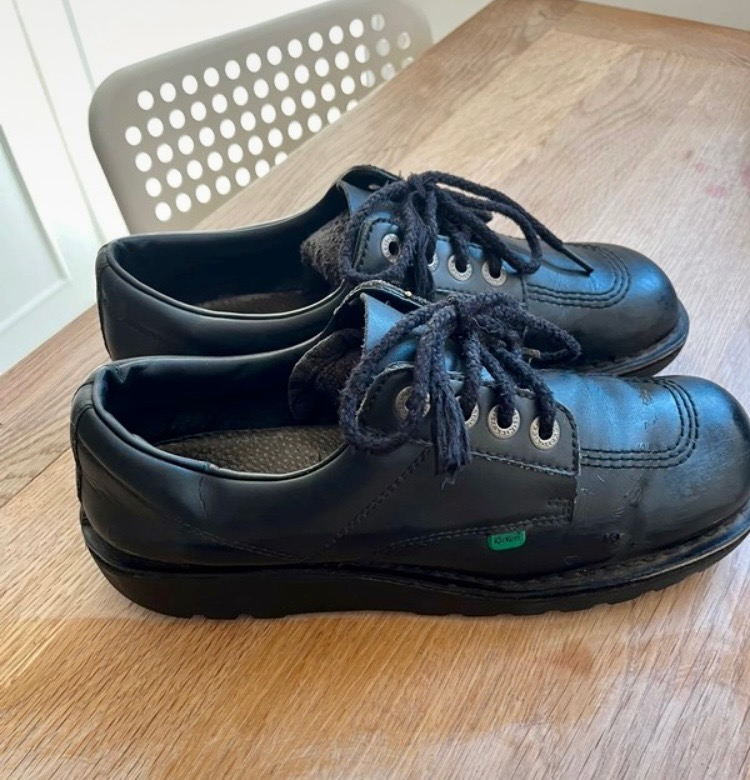
An example of the Kickers 'Lo' style. This particular pair had been used as school shoes by a British teenager

On the French scene in 1970, Daniel Raufast came across a poster advertising the musical Hair. Interested by all the barefooted youngsters wearing jeans, he developed a shoe concept which he believed to be more compatible with the blue-jean generation. The designer Jacques Chevallereau created the first 'jean boot'. This shoe was different: the use of nubuck; shapes that looked more like short boots than regular shoes; tough crepe soles made with natural rubber, eyelets, contrast stitching, panels and appliqués all referencing denim. The success was such that, within one season, Kickers production capacity grew from 300 to 12,000 pairs per month. Immediately successful in France, then Germany, by 1974, Kickers were selling in over 70 countries.

=== United Kingdom ===
David Bowie wore a pair of Kickers on the set of Peace on Earth/Little Drummer Boy alongside Bing Crosby in 1977. He was also photographed by Clive Arrowsmith in that same year, as well as appearing on the front cover of Melody Maker on February 18, 1978, resplendent in the brand.

During the 1980s Kickers shoes became very successful in Britain. So much so in some case, children were queuing up until 10 o'clock at night waiting upon deliveries, and when the delivery did arrive the stock would be gone in a flash. Many children also collected the flower shape tag and did not believe the shoes were real Kickers unless this tag was included.

=== School shoes ===
A variety of Kickers shoes, primarily the Lo and Hi top styles, have proven to be popular amongst British school children, attending secondary school, as use of school shoes.

=== Kick Hi ===
The Kick Hi boot was released in 1975.
