= Blacks Outdoor Retail =

British retailer

Blacks Outdoor Retail Ltd.
- Type: Private (subsidiary)
- Industry: Outdoors and Camping
- Founded: 1861 in Greenock
- Headquarters: Bury, United Kingdom
- Area served: UK
- Key people: CEO JD Outdoor Dominic Jordan
- Products: Outdoor, camping, walking, skiing and mountaineering equipment
- Number of employees: 250 est
- Parent: JD Sports Fashion plc
- Website: www.blacks.co.uk

Blacks Outdoor Retail Ltd. is a British retailer, headquartered in Bury, Greater Manchester the United Kingdom which owns the British outdoor retailers Blacks, Millets and Ultimate Outdoors. Blacks is the largest outdoor retailer in the UK with stores nationwide. As of November 2026 only 18 Blacks Outdoors (3 currently holding closing down sales November 2026) and 21 Millets stores (7 currently holding closing down sales November 2026 ) remain open with most having converted to Go Outdoors.

== History ==
In 1931, Blacks of Greenock published the first Good Companions catalogue. In the Second World War, Blacks made tents for the Army and Navy and made fenders for boats on D-Day. During the early part of the war, the workshops in Greenock were destroyed by a parachute mine on 8 May 1941. They had a number of retail stores throughout the UK selling and renting camping equipment, climbing and mountaineering supplies. The company was run from Greenock by Robin Duthie in the 1970s.

A Canadian retail subsidiary opened in 1958. Throughout the 1960s, it bought smaller companies including Jackson Camping. Then in 1967, it bought Benjamin Edgington Ltd, a long established independent tent, flag and marquee maker, creating a new southern base with another manufacturing facility and offices from where it ran its sales and Marketing team led by John Jackson. In 1970, it engineered a reverse takeover of the public company retailer Milletts Stores (1928) Limited that had 28 stores under the management of Anthony Millett, who had taken over after his father's death. The Group then became known as Blacks Camping and Leisure. There was another reverse takeover of retailer Greenfield Leisure in October 1984, and the Group become Blacks Camping and Leisure plc. The Greenfield Leisure stores turned out to be loss making and Blacks were forced to sell 62 of the 66 Greenfield Leisure stores.

The Blacks Leisure Group formed in 1985, is now defunct as a company. In 1986, the company and its 280 employees and 44 stores almost went into receivership. A £3.3 million offer came from the Sears Group who owned Millets, but this transaction was not completed. It received a cash injection from investors to keep it afloat the following month. It bought Miss Sam Holdings, a childrenswear company, in July 1987 for £45 million. At this time, it was headed by Bernard Garbacz. In 1989 it moved its operations to Washington, Tyne & Wear. In 1994, Blacks Camping became Blacks Outdoors.

It bought the Outdoor Group, which included Millets and Free Spirit, in November 1999 for £51 million, having first offered £55 million. At the time, Blacks had 42 stores and a 40% share in the Fila UK Ltd sportswear firm; it sold this share to the parent company in July 2000 for £12 million. In May 2002 it sold its sports division, 187 First Sport outlets, to JD Sports for £53.2 million and bought 47 outlets of Famous Army Stores in February 2002. In July 2003 it bought the Just Add Water chain of 10 shops for £4.3 million. In November 2004 it bought 27 Outdoor outlets for £2.6 million from The Scout Association. Until 2006, it engaged in an expansion of its business by opening many new stores, especially on retail parks. This expansion was short-lived.

=== Financial troubles ===
In 2008/9 it made a loss of £6.8 million, which was a pre-tax loss of £14.4 million. Freespirit and O'Neill were not selling well, but the more well known stores were better. In early 2009 it had 12 O'Neill surf shops, but later that year Blacks is thought to have entered talks with Ronald De Waal (owner of the O'Neill brand name) to try to arrange a deal with O'Neill and Logo Group International, based in the Netherlands, to offload the stores. A deal never materialised, and the stores faced closure when Sandcity, the company who held the licence to sell and distribute O'Neill in the UK, was put into administration. Sandcity had been based in Washington, Tyne and Wear, which itself closed in May 2008, moving to the Northampton headquarters. The first UK-based O'Neill store opened in December 1997 in Covent Garden. Sandcity went into administration on 23 September 2009. This had to happen when the bank (Lloyds) refused Blacks' offer to convert them into Blacks and Millets stores. The wholesale licence of O'Neill in the UK was handed back to Logo Group International, based in the Netherlands at the same time.

In October 2009, 89 stores where closed as part of a restructuring, after the company went through a CVA which was supported by a huge majority of creditors. Before the closure it had 256 Millets, 116 Blacks and 32 Freespirit. By February 2010 it had 208 Millets, 92 Blacks and 13 Freespirit. The CVA was executed and Blacks exited a number of loss-making stores, but not before a number of the stores classed as "loss making" underwent an extensive refurbishment program using around £6 million of capital. The most costly of these stores was the Air Land and Sea store at Bluewater shopping centre in Kent. After a costing an estimated £3m and branded "the first of many to open in the UK", the store was in operation for less than 12 months, and closed as part of a CVA. Of all the stores refurbished, they were originally reported to be trading ahead of the rest of the estate. Several of the newly refurbished stores remained loss-making, and were closed when a CVA was agreed. Of the refurbished stores, the newly refurbished Blacks store at the ex-Freespirit site in Northampton was also closed.

On 23 November 2009, it reached an agreement with its creditors, landlords of its stores, which needed 75% backing. This saved the company from liquidation, with a period of great uncertainty from September to November

In early 2010, the company received a £26 million takeover offer from Sports Direct, which it fought off. Sports Direct owned around 30% of Blacks' shares. It was at this time that Blacks sold off its Mambo boardwear arm for an estimated £800,000 to New Zealand born Andrew Gerrie (CEO of Lush cosmetics).

Private equity funds, including the owner of rival Cotswold Outdoor, circled Blacks after it confirmed early talks on a possible offer in late October 2010.

On 7 December 2011, the group was put up for sale. On 23 December 2011 the directors stated that the company was likely to enter receivership. The company was effectively insolvent and the shares likely to be worthless. Potential buyers would only be interested after an administration process.

The company entered administration in 2012 and is now owned by JD Sports Fashion plc. JD made a cash offer of £20 million for the majority of the retailer's 300 UK stores and said it will retain the majority of Blacks' 3,500 staff. Since the acquisition by JD Sports, Blacks head offices have been relocated to JD's head offices in Bury.

As a business, despite identified potential for VAT reclaims of over £1 million, Blacks entered a 'pre-pack' administration for only four hours, to allow the new owner JD Sports to take the business forward debt-free.

Back to profit in 2017 and now part of JD Sports Fashion, Blacks and Millets, led by CEO Lee Bagnall, returned to profit for the first time in almost ten years. The results announced as part of JD Sports annual results 11 April 2017 was taken as positive by the city, as JD shares rose to record levels. After 10 years in loss Blacks records a second consecutive year in profit.

== Operations ==
=== Blacks ===
Blacks has 21 UK stores, originally specialising in the serious walking and hiking kit. Recently they have diversified to including running clothing and more fashion based lines.

Black's of Greenock Chronological History including Thomas Black and Sons 1848 Thomas Black, aged 12, went off to sea for a few years.

1853 While in Port Phillip, Australia, he left his ship for the goldfields and spent two years gold-digging in the Ballarat District of southern Australia.

1856 Sailed home as a fare-paying passenger. Later, went to Spanish Guinea in West Africa as an agent for the London firm of Laughland & Brown, trading Calico and other goods for ivory. Returned to Glasgow after about eighteen months for a holiday. A second trip to the same place in West Africa was not satisfactory. He suffered badly from dysentery and eventually returned home, where he made a full recovery.

1861 Married and became employed as a sailmaker in Glasgow.

1863 After about two years learning the trade, he started his own sail-making business in Greenock, which prospered from the start. Thomas Black had a son, also named Thomas, who started his working life with his father, but seeing no future in the sail-making business, due to the decline in sailing ships brought about by the rise in steam engines, left with his wife and young family to join relatives ranching in California.

1904 Thomas Black Senior was now an old man and ill, so his son Thomas Junior was called home to wind up the failing business. Whilst journeying across America on his way home, he stopped off in Kansas City and saw a thriving canvas products business making tents, marquees and other large canvas goods. This set him thinking, and on returning home, decided not to close his father's business, but instead, to change the product range, to bell tents, marquees and garden tents for fetes and functions.

1905 Thomas Black Senior, the founder of the business, died. Thomas Junior became head of the firm, with his son, Daniel Crawford Black assisting. Hiring out equipment was begun with one-time sail-makers having to erect tents and marquees.

1914–18 During the First World War, manufactured large hospital marquees, army bell tents, ambulance covers and other canvas goods.

1921 Black's Travel Agency started at 18 Nicholson Street, Greenock, to meet the demand for emigrant passages to North America and Australasia.

1923 Thomas Black and Sons (Greenock) Ltd. incorporated.

1928 A London showroom opened at 15 Bury Street, W.C.1. (near the British Museum).

1930 An order was received from the Icelandic Government for 4,700 tents, as well as marquees, beds and bedding for the 14,000 visitors expected at the Millennial Celebrations of the opening of their Parliament. The tents supplied later became known as the 'Icelandic' tent.

1930 May. Thomas Black, Junior, died and his son, Crawford Black took over as head of the business. Blacks did much to encourage lightweight camping, and in 1931 produced the first 'Good Companions' catalogue.

1931 Thos. Black & Sons (Greenock) Ltd., were at 25, Cathcart Street, Greenock, with branches at: 15 Bury Street, London, W.C.1., and 5, Royal Exchange Square, Glasgow. Soon larger premises and offices were required in London, and a move was made to 22, Gray's Inn Road in the early thirties. William Nixon, a director of the firm in London, first started his career in the Bury Street premises. Around this time, the 'Good Companions' trade mark was registered.

1933 Lightweight camping gear supplied to Jock Scott, an ex soldier who walked from Greenock to Cape Town. With another set of equipment by Blacks, Jock Scott then walked across North America from San Francisco to New York. These two trips were an important showcase for Black's tents and equipment.

1930s Throughout this period and up to the outbreak of the Second World War, Blacks exhibited at all the various Outdoor and Camping exhibitions held in London.

1939 on the outbreak of war, the directors of Blacks were: D. C. Black; J. H. Black; M. P. Garvie; B. B. Black; W. R. Henderson, with the registered office at: 25 Cathcart Street, Greenock, the Glasgow Showrooms at 98 Mitchell Street, and London Showrooms at Holborn House, 22, Gray's Inn Road, W.C.1. A London warehouse was in use at 43, Marshgate Lane, E.15.

1939–45 Blacks made tents and other canvas goods, as well as down sleeping bags for the armed forces. Blacks also made and supplied hazel rod fenders for the Navy.

1941 May 7. Greenock premises completely destroyed in the blitz of Greenock. Temporary premises found. After the war, a new factory was leased on an industrial estate at Port Glasgow. In 1948, it was opened by Hector Mcneil, Secretary of State for Scotland.

1946 Acquired the rival business of Camp and Sports Co-operators (trading as Camtors). Directors of this new acquisition shown as D.C. Black and W.R. Henderson. This was to be the first of many acquisitions by Blacks.

1948 New manufacturing premises at the Scottish Industrial Estate, Port Glasgow, Renfrewshire. New showrooms at: 2, Robertson Street, Greenock, and 126, Hope Street, Glasgow. Larger tents now available in various sizes.

1950 Branch at 2 Robertson Street, Greenock, closed. A new post war edition of the Good Companions Catalogue now available.

1951 The popular Good Companions tent of pre war days, re-styled and now available at £9.17.6.

1953 Acquired the business of City Camp & Sports (Birmingham) Ltd., of 86–87 Broad Street, Birmingham, 15.

1955-6 New Branch at 18, Nicholson Street, Greenock. Directors now D. C. Black (chairman); B. B. Black; W. R. Henderson; and London director: W. G. S. Nixon.

1957-8 Branch at 126, Hope Street, Glasgow, closed and a new showroom opened at 60, St. Vincent Street.

1958 A subsidiary company, Thomas Black & Sons (Canada) Ltd. opened at 222, Strathcona Avenue, Ottawa 1, Ontario, Canada. to market tents and equipment in North America.

1958 Late. Greenock showroom at 18, Nicholson Street, closed.

1959 Late. M. A. White appointed Sales Director.

1960s Exhibited a wide range of tents and equipment at a number of Camping and Outdoor Life Exhibitions held in the sixties.

1961 Glasgow Showroom moved again, this time to 132, St. Vincent Street.

1962 A warehouse opened in Ogdensburg, U.S.A. Thomas Black & Sons (Ogdensburg) Inc. at 930, Ford Street, Ogdensburg, New York, U.S.A. Blacks now one of the leading suppliers of camping and outdoor equipment in the UK. Mr R. G. Duthie appointed managing director of the Group.

1962 Acquired the prominent ski equipment and outdoor supplies firm of Jackson & Warr. Their London office was grouped with Camtors to become: Camtors, Jackson & Warr Ltd., while the Sheffield branch at 16–20 Corporation Street, Sheffield 3, remained independent within the group as Jackson & Warr (Sheffield) Ltd., at number 18, Corporation Street.

1963 Centenary of the company. A special commemorative brochure published. Almost 400 people now employed, while turnover had increased by five times in the last ten years. Acquired, Nottingham Camp & Sports Ltd., of Shakespeare Street, Nottingham.

1965 D. C. Black, chairman of the group awarded an M.B.E. in the New Year's Honours List in recognition of his efforts in the field of exports.

1965 March 31. W. R. Henderson retired after almost 30 years' service with the company. Mr Henderson was a member of the Camping Club for many years and it was through his interest in the club and a chance remark being passed that led to the acquisition by Blacks in 1946 of Camp & Sports Co-operators.

1965 July. An additional 10,000 square feet manufacturing extension opened at Port Glasgow to cater for the growing demand for tents and sleeping bags.

1966–67 An approach received from Silver & Edgington with a view to being taken over. On exchanging financial details however, it was seen that Blacks had the better trading position and profit record. It was mutually agreed that Blacks would effect a reverse takeover of Silver and Edgington, although in the Blacks' 1968 catalogue, it states that it was a merger between the two companies.

1967 July. On completion of this arrangement, the new group was named Black & Edgington Ltd., with R.G. Duthie, the current managing director of Blacks, becoming the new Group M.D. Acquired the Scout Shop at 40–42 Marsh Street, Hanley, Stoke-on-Trent. Later on in the year, acquired, Q. M. Stores branch, 250, High Street, Sutton, Surrey.

1968 Benjamin Edgington's shop in Shaftesbury Avenue, London W.1. closed and merged with Black's new branch at 53 Rathbone Place, Oxford Street, London. The recent acquisition of Players Sports Ltd., late of Newman Street, also moved to these extensive new premises, where the largest display of camping equipment was on show spread over three floors. Blacks retained their City branch at 22–24 Gray's Inn Road, London. Northern Division: Port Glasgow, Scotland. Southern Division: Ruxley Corner, Sidcup, Kent. Black's Camp & Canvas Hires Ltd., Ladyburn, Greenock, Scotland. Benjamin Edgington Hire Ltd., Tower Bridge, London, S.E.1. Player Sports had an agreement with British Rail, which saw the provision of stocks of camping equipment established at the Channel Ports of Dover and Newhaven in conjunction with the Big Fleet Car Ferry Service.

1968 December. New range of frame tents for 1969 – The Safari Range. Frame tents now a major feature in the catalogue and an important part of overall sales. 1969 September. The Leeds Camping Centre acquired. Previously owned by Yorkshire Camping Shops Ltd.

1970 Spring. Now operating the "U-Haul" trailer hire service with camping equipment hire linked with Sealink Cross-Channel Services. Also this year, a mobile exhibition unit built for touring the country and attending local demonstrations.

1970 Acquired the old West Country firm of Joseph Bryant & Co., manufacturers of caravan awnings, etc.

1970 Acquired the firm of Milletts Stores (1928) Ltd. The benefit here, was in the large number of retail outlets added to complement the growing number of revamped Blacks' Leisure shops being set up.

1972 Acquired Andrew Mitchell & Co. Ltd., a Scottish-based company manufacturing and supplying tarpaulins. This merger almost doubled the size of the group.

1972 Acquired Clares Carlton Ltd., a Somerset-based manufacturer of protective work-wear.

1976 October. Following many years of negotiation, acquired by mutual agreement the old established firm of John Edgington & Co. Ltd., of 108, Old Kent Road, London – tent makers and hirers, and suppliers of fine camping equipment par excellence since its inception in 1805. The latter half of the seventies however, saw Blacks in recession and in decline. All similar firms were in the same position.

1977–79 Acquired Vango (Scotland) Ltd., 47, Colvend Street, Glasgow, which became an associated company within the group. Their reputation was founded on quality products, of which the Force Ten range of tents were perhaps best known. They also made frame tents and sleeping bags.

1980 By this year, of the long established tents, only the Good Companions Standard, Major, and the Arctic Guinea, were available. There were, however, some new nylon tents, an Atlas range, and the long established Patrol tents. With decline due to recession obvious, it was all a far cry from the catalogue product list of twenty years ago.

1982 There were many problems affecting the camping and outdoor leisure industry in the seventies, some of them were 'home grown' through government legislation, while others were of an international nature. There was also the change in the public's buying habits. These problems impacted on firms like the Black & Edgington Group, giving a few years of recession. This recessional period lasted for a period of five to six years and peaked around 1979–81. Pay policies imposed by the Government, which were intended to limit inflation, did almost the exact opposite. With demand greatly diminished, the result for the Black & Edgington Group was that the factories at Bristol, Sidcup and Greenock had to be closed. The head office factory at Port Glasgow and the Mitchell Unit in Glasgow were the only two which survived. It was in the middle of all these problems with closures that the Board had to contend with a predator situation with regard to a small amount of equity. A very small percentage holding was sold by one of the non-executive directors to a third party, who in turn sold it to a body interested in purchasing part of the group. With continuing poor performance from the B&E Group, the predator increased his holding substantially. This became the situation as of June 1983, when it was made clear by the predator that a full bid could be made within a few days. The initial reaction was to reject any bid, but financial advisers made it clear, that in the light of the continuing poor performance and the time it might take to restore profits, a 'defence' was impractical, and it was in the best interests of shareholders to 'surrender'.

1983 Between June 1983 and 2 April 1984, the Group, as it had been, ceased to exist. The purchaser had made it clear throughout negotiations that he only wanted the Travel Division, and was prepared to sell off what remained to the highest bidder. As it happened, each division was sold off to its own management, with the exception of Blacks Camping and Leisure Shops, which went to others outside the group.

Tent manufacturing became: Vango (Scotland) Ltd., thereby reverting to the position it had before being amalgamated with Blacks some years earlier. The company retains the Black & Edgington business registration number. Apart from the Bungalow and the large patrol tents (Icelandic, Stormhaven and Nijer), no other Blacks tents were continued by the successor owners, although some of Blacks sleeping bags, particularly the Icelandic range, were. The Hiring and Flag Divisions amalgamated to become Black & Edgington Ltd. under a management buy-out. With a London base at Stratford for a few years, the head office was at Needingworth Road, St. Ives, Cambridgeshire. Although still retaining its name, it subsequently became part of the Sellers Leisure Group until around 2002, when it then gave up its name as the Sellers Group became part of the Arena Event Services Group.

=== Millets ===
In the UK after the First and Second World Wars there were many retailers trading under the name Milletts or Millets. There are tales that the original Millett family had many daughters and gave each a dowry of one or more stores which were then run by their sons-in-law under separate company names with qualifiers in brackets after the name such as (1928) Ltd or (Bristol) Ltd. They all sold government surplus clothing and equipment including camping and outdoor leisure goods.

Milletts (1928) Ltd, with 28 stores was bought by Blacks of Greenock in 1970. Millets with 92 stores was founded in 1893 by Mr J.M. Millet and had two stores in Southampton and Bristol. In 1978, the company moved to Northampton. Includes own brands Eurohike and Peter Storm. In 1986, it formed Millets Leisure plc. This became the Outdoor Group in 1996 with 158 stores, which was bought by Blacks Leisure plc in 1999. Millets is not related to Millet, a French manufacturer of outdoor equipment.

The 2008 album CSI:Ambleside by Half Man Half Biscuit has a song that contains the line "There's a man with a mullet going mad with a mallet in Millets".

=== Ultimate Outdoors ===
The Ultimate Outdoors name was first used on a store opened on New Street in Lancaster in 1998 as part of a sale of the Harry Robinsons outdoor shop which had been located in a couple of converted houses on New Road in Lancaster from June 1961 until August 1998. The New Street shop later became branded as Go Outdoors.

A new store format called Ultimate Outdoors was introduced in Preston in July 2014, combining Blacks and Millets ranges with additional cycling, fishing and climbing ranges, as well as an in-store cafe.

An Ultimate Outdoor retail store was opened on the Castle Marina Retail Park in Nottingham on the 6th June 2015 including a cafe and children's play area. It was announced the store would be closing in December 2021.

In January 2026 Blacks Outdoor Retail Ltd announced that they would be closing the Ultimate Outdoors brand, directing customers to the Go Outdoors brand which is within the same group.

=== Sponsorship ===
On 30 April 2013, Blacks Outdoor were announced as the new shirt sponsor for professional football team Oldham Athletic for the 2013/14 season. On 25 June 2013, Blacks Outdoor were announced as the new shirt sponsor for Morecambe Football Club for the 2013/14 season.

== Brands ==
=== Own brands ===
The company manufactures the following brands for sale in its Blacks and Millets stores:

- Peter Storm – clothing and footwear.
- Technicals – (withdrawn in 2012 but relaunched in September 2014)
- Eurohike – equipment such as rucksacks and tents.
- Blacks – equipment.
- Northridge - Clothing

=== Withdrawn brands ===
Blacks have withdrawn the following own-brands:

- Storm Shield – (although withdrawn as a brand in 2011, Peter Storm has used the name for its waterproof system since 2014.)
- Thomas Black – footwear (withdrawn in 2013)
- Equator – (withdrawn lifestyle brand)
- ALS (withdrawn lifestyle brand)
- Storm Tech (withdrawn end of 2009)
- Rare Species (withdrawn women's-only brand)
- High-Point (withdrawn, sold a limited number of equipment lines, notably walking poles and tents)
