= Red or Dead =

Fashion designer and manufacturer

- Type: Private
- Industry: Footwear; Optician
- Founded: 1982; 44 years ago
- Headquarters: London, UK
- Products: Shoes, glasses
- Brands: Specsavers
- Parent: Pentland Group
- Website: Red or Dead (archived)

Red or Dead was a fashion designer and manufacturer, started in London in 1982 by married couple Gerardine Hemingway and Wayne Hemingway. They designed products such as shoes, spectacles, bags and watches.

== History ==
In 1982, Wayne and Gerardine Hemingway opened a stall on Camden Market, London to sell items from their wardrobes. Within a year they had expanded to sixteen stalls of second-hand clothes, purchased from all over the world. They opened their first shop in Soho in 1986, and moved to Covent Garden in 1987. The company's name (Red or Dead) refers both to an inversion of the Cold War slogan "Better dead than red", and to Wayne's indigenous Canadian ancestors.

The Hemingways began making and retailing their own designs. Red or Dead became popular with some young pop artists of the late 80's, including Kylie Minogue, Bros, Jason Donovan and Pet Shop Boys. Wayne Hemingway later explained their goal "to be the first designer company that sold to everyday people". London Fashion Week snubbed them at first on the grounds that designer fashion was meant to be elitist, but later relented, and Red or Dead won the British Fashion Council's Streetstyle Designer of the Year Award, from 1995 to 1997.

In 1995 they sold the brand to Stephen Hinchliffe's Facia Group. Facia collapsed the next year, and receivers sold Red or Dead back to the Hemingways. At that time it was counted as "one of the UK's leading fashion chains", employing more than 100 people. By 1998 it had 120 employees and outlets around the world.

In 1998, Red or Dead was sold to the Pentland Group. Pentland Group's accounts for 2022 listed Red or Dead as a "hibernated business".

== Red or Dead products ==
Red or Dead expanded its product base and, as of 2012, it included footwear, clothing, fashion handbags, optical frames, swimwear and "glorious gussets" hosiery. The brand was also being used on fragrance from The Perfume Shop and fashion versions of Raleigh bicycles.

In the UK, Red or Dead's footwear range was exclusively sold through the Schuh chain of stores, but the brand is no longer listed by Schuh. It is not clear whether the range is currently available elsewhere.
