= Speedo =

Swimwear and sports goods company

Speedo International Limited

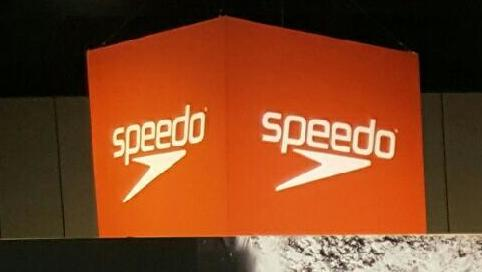
- Type: Private
- Industry: Textile; Footwear
- Predecessor: Danomic Investments Ltd.
- Founded: 1914; 112 years ago in Sydney, Australia
- Founder: Alexander MacRae
- Fate: Acquired
- Headquarters: Nottingham, England
- Area served: Worldwide
- Key people: Chirag Patel (CEO)
- Products: Swimsuits; Sportswear; Flip-flops
- Parent: Pentland Group
- Website: www.speedo.com

Speedo International Limited is an Australian-British distributor of swimwear and swim-related accessories based in Nottingham, England.

Founded in Sydney, Australia in 1914 by Alexander MacRae, a Scottish emigrant, the company is now a subsidiary of the British Pentland Group. Today, the Speedo brand can be found on products ranging from swimsuits and goggles to wristwatches. The Speedo brand was previously manufactured for and marketed in North America as Speedo USA by PVH, under an exclusive perpetual licence, which had acquired prior licensee Warnaco Group in 2013. In January 2020, the Pentland Group purchased back the rights from PVH for $170 million in cash, subject to regulatory approval.

In accordance with its Australian roots, Speedo uses a boomerang as its symbol. Due to its success in the swimwear industry, the word Speedo has become a known trademark for racing bathing suits.

== History ==
=== Speedo Knitting Mills ===
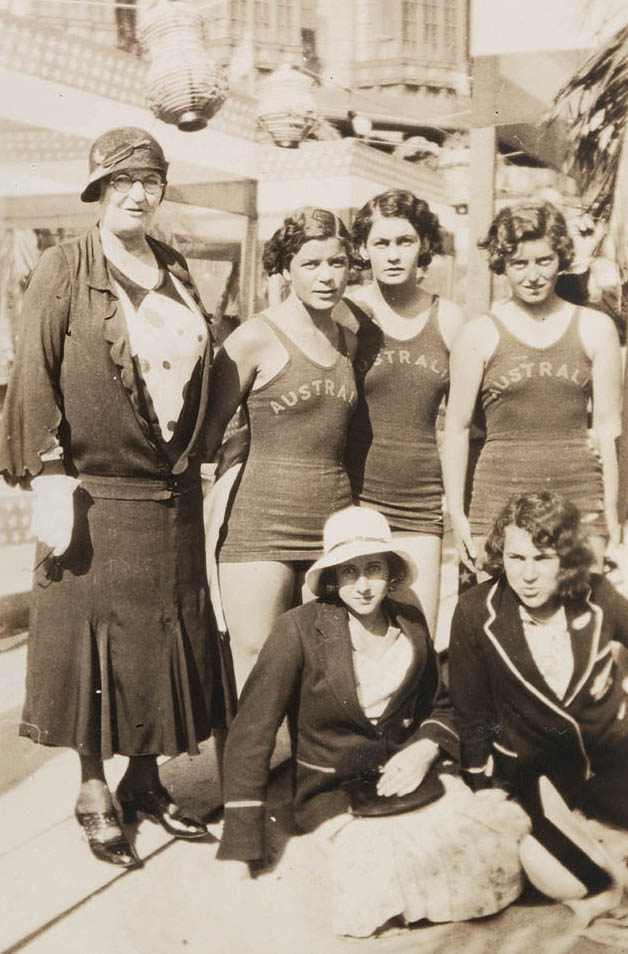
Australian swimmers Bonnie Mealing, Clare Dennis, Frances Bult with chaperone and sprinters Eileen Wearne (Aus) and Thelma Kench (NZ) at the 1932 Los Angeles Olympics

Company founder Alexander MacRae emigrated from Loch Kishorn in the western Highlands of Scotland to Sydney, Australia in 1910. Originally working as a milkman, he founded MacRae and Company Hosiery four years later, manufacturing underwear under the brand name Fortitude (taken from his family crest). The Australian Army's need for socks during World War I provided MacRae with enough business to expand and in 1927 his first line of swimwear, called a "racer-back costume" was introduced. The following year, a naming contest held among the MacRae staff yielded the slogan "Speed on in your Speedos." The brand name was born. The contest winner, Captain Parsonson, was awarded £5 for his slogan and the company was renamed Speedo Knitting Mills.

The controversial yet revolutionary racerback style's open shoulder and exposed back allowed greater range of motion in water and was quickly adopted by competitive swimmers, despite being banned by some beaches. In 1932, Speedo made its Olympic debut when 16-year old Australian Clare Dennis won the Women's 200 metre Breaststroke at the Los Angeles Olympic Games. After nearly being disqualified for "showing too much shoulder" in her regulation silk Speedo brand swimsuit, Dennis went on to set a world record time of 3:06.3. The 1936 Berlin Summer Games also saw some controversy as the men's Australian swim team featured shirtless swim trunks for the first time. Also in 1936, Alexander MacRae became involved in the Surf Life Saving Association. To this day, Speedo continues to support the Australian volunteer organisation.

=== Post-War expansion ===
After devoting most of its resources to the War effort during World War II, Speedo enjoyed a great post-war demand for swimsuits, specifically the recently invented bikini style. The company quickly reestablished itself as a leader in swimwear manufacturing and once again drew controversy when its two-piece was banned by Australian beach inspectors. In 1951, Speedo Knitting Mills (Holdings) Ltd. incorporated and went public, selling its stock on the Sydney Stock Exchange. In 1955, nylon was used for the first time in the company's swimsuits and the next year, the increasingly popular swimsuit brand returned to the Olympics when its home country hosted the Melbourne Summer Games. The Speedo sponsored Australian men's swim team took home eight gold medals and brought a new worldwide level of notoriety to the company which debuted the swim briefs that would become synonymous with the brand name. By 1957, Speedo had the exclusive licence to manufacture and distribute Jockey brand men's underwear in Australia. The company finished off the 1950s by exporting to the United States and exploring potential opportunities in South America, Europe, New Zealand and Japan.

The end of the 1950s also saw the beginning of a long-lasting business partnership which continues to this day. In 1958, Speedo began the manufacture of American Warnaco's White Stag ski-wear line. In exchange, in 1961, White Stag became the exclusive US distributor of Speedo swimwear. Through White Stag, Speedo's product line expanded to include men's and women's sportswear. By the middle of the 1960s, Speedo had acquired 30% of Nottingham, England textile manufacturer Robert Shaw & Company and had established a European subsidiary. Licences were also granted to Japanese and South American corporations. The 1968 Mexico City Summer Olympics saw 27 of the 29 gold medalists—22 of which set world records—wearing Speedo brand swimsuits.

Speedo began the next decade by completing its acquisition of Robert Shaw & Company in 1971. The 1970s also saw the company pioneer the use of elastane (spandex) and the brand's use in Olympic record breaking continued at the 1972 Munich and 1976 Montreal games, the latter of which Speedo was an official swimwear licensee.

On Australia Day, 26 January 1981 the Australian Institute of Sport opened in Canberra, with Speedo as its first official sponsor. Also early in the decade, Speedo provided equipment and training to China to aid the communist country's return to the Olympics for first time since 1958. Throughout the decade, the brand expanded its reach in Europe by licensing production in Italy, Spain, Sweden and other nations, bringing its total distribution to 112 countries.

=== Modern technology ===
In 1990, British sportswear firm Pentland Group, which had just sold its shares of sneaker company Reebok, acquired a significant stake in Warnaco offshoot Authentic Fitness, which was the exclusive North American licensee of Speedo. Pentland followed this move with the purchase of 80% of Speedo (Europe) Ltd. Early the next year, Pentland completed its aggressive entrance into the global swimwear market by wholly acquiring Speedo Australia and Speedo International. Under Pentland's ownership, Speedo expanded its line of swimwear to include more fashion-oriented beachwear as well as triathlon accessories.

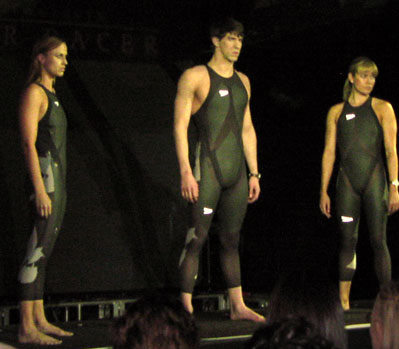
Michael Phelps (centre) unveils the Speedo LZR Racer suit.

The 1990s saw the creation of the low-drag S2000 suit, the chlorine resistant Endurance line as well as the Aquablade series which was worn by more than three-fourths of medal winners at the 1996 Atlanta Summer Games.

Speedo began the 21st century with the introduction of its Fastskin swimsuit and, again, broke world records when the Summer Games returned to the swimwear leader's home town. The company website boasts that 13 out of the 15 swimming records broken in the 2000 Sydney Olympics were by athletes wearing Speedo. Three years later, Speedo celebrated its 75th anniversary with special limited edition lines endorsed by Jerry Hall, Naomi Campbell and others. In 2004, Michael Phelps wore the Fastskin II, the latest evolution of the Fastskin series, in Athens to become the first swimmer to earn eight medals. Phelps followed up this performance four years later, earning eight golds at Beijing, while wearing Speedo's LZR Racer suit In 2010, the company launched Speedo Sculpture ShapeLine, a new line of body-shaping swimsuits for women.

== Products ==
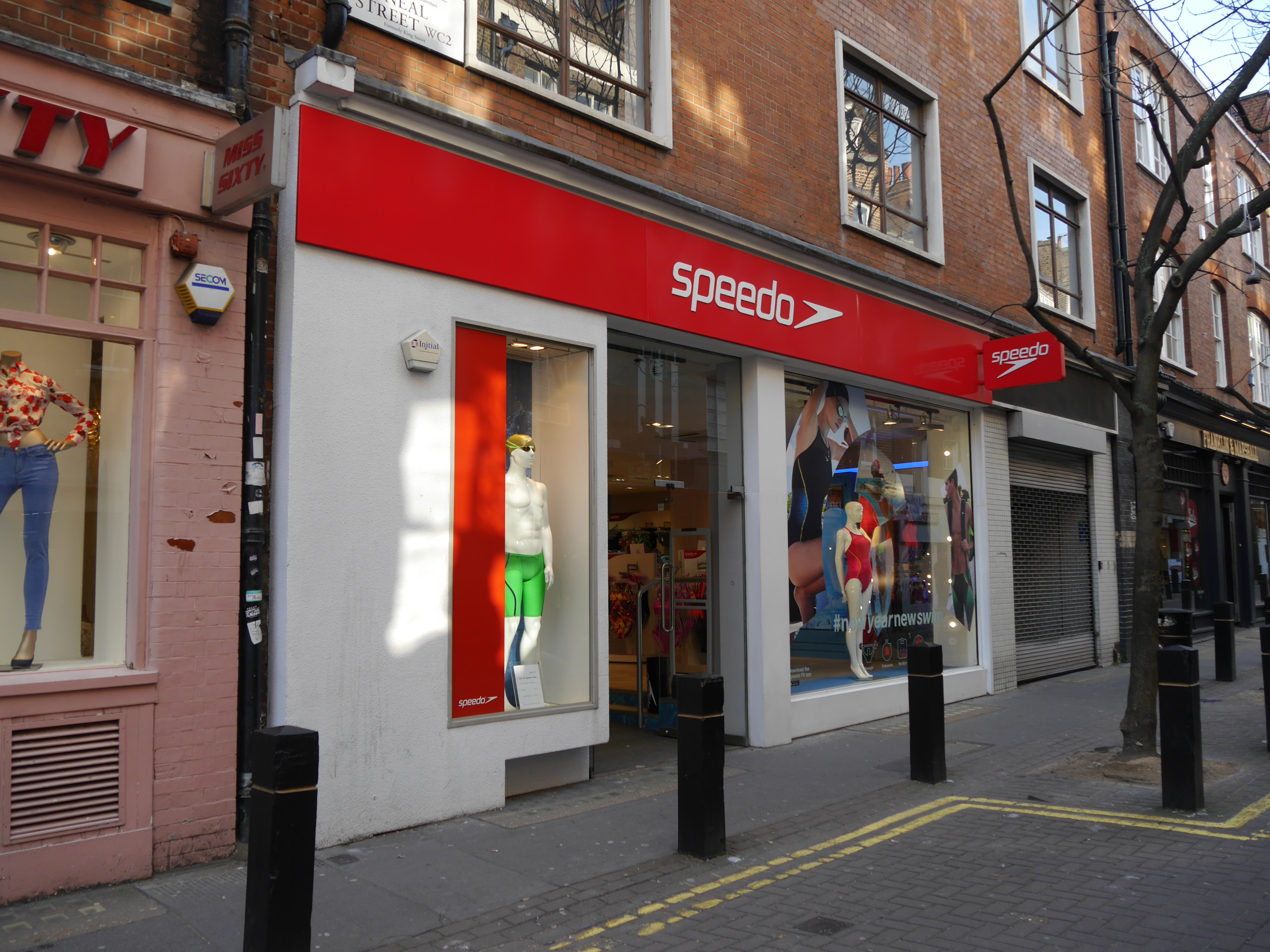
Speedo shop, Neal Street, Covent Garden, London

Although the brand name Speedo is often genericised to refer to any style of men's swim briefs, these account for less than 2% of the company's sales. The Speedo name can be found on a wide range of swimsuit styles for men, women, and children focusing on performance and style. Speedo also offers a range of sportswear, footwear, and accessories ranging from swim goggles to electronics. Additionally, Speedo International offers a line of men's underwear and Speedo Australia features a line of underwear called Speedo Underbody for men and women, sold only in select David Jones retail stores.

=== Accessories ===
Speedo offers a broad range of swim accessories including more than seventy models of goggles, several models of watches, sunglasses, and towels. In addition, Speedo offers several lines of aquatic fitness aids and swim aids for children and adults as well as scuba masks, snorkels and swimfins. Speedo International offers a line of beach games equipment not offered on the SpeedoUSA website.

=== Footwear ===
The Speedo brand can be found on a wide variety of footwear including sandals, flip-flops, and water shoes. Speedo USA offers waterproof sneakers for aqua fitness training.

=== Speedo Digital ===
The Speedo Digital line of accessories includes the waterproof Aquabeat and LZR Racer Aquabeat digital music players and related accessories, which are manufactured by South Korean consumer electronics company Iriver. Speedo's electronics offerings also include the Auquashot waterproof digital camera.

== Swimwear ==
Speedo USA's men's collections are categorised as: Competition, Racing, Boardshorts and Swim Trunks, Fashion, and Lifeguard. Speedo International's men's offerings also include wetsuits. Both Speedo USA and Speedo International also offer a wide range of children's styles including performance, racing, fashion and beginner lines.

=== Controversial technology ===
Swim records were broken in Speedo brand silk suits in the 1930s, and the company was the first to introduce the use of nylon in the 1950s and later nylon/elastane in the 1970s. Speedo's most recent technological advances are found in the Fastskin, Fastskin FS II series and the LZR Racer suit. Throughout the company's history, though, it seemed each design innovation was met with great controversy. Clare Dennis was nearly disqualified from her record-breaking Olympic meet because her suit showed too much skin; early Speedo bikinis were banned from some Australian beaches; more recently, the NASA technology in the LZR Racer suit Michael Phelps wore at the Beijing Olympics was the subject of great media scrutiny.

==== Fastskin ====
In 2000, British designer and former competitive swimmer Fiona Fairhurst was named as a finalist for European Inventor of the Year. Fairhurst helped Speedo's Aqualab design team invent the first-of-its-kind Fastskin swimsuit. Inspired by the varying skin texture of a shark, Fairhurst told the BBC that she was "looking to develop a fabric that mimics nature". Both the Fastskin and Fastkskin FS II are textured with bumps and ridges in key places, similar to those on a shark's skin. These ridges are claimed to channel the water over the swimmer's body in a more efficient manner than traditional material suits. However, research in 2012 has suggested that the artificial sharkskin patterning does not benefit human swimmers, whose body movement is different from sharks.

In addition, the suits are custom designed for the type of stroke the swimmer will use as well as being engineered differently for women and for men. These high-tech suits make use of elastic compression materials to limit muscle oscillation and to compress the swimmer's body, while in other areas a more flexible fabric is used to allow greater range of motion. Leaving no detail overlooked, the design team also uses low-profile seams. According to author Frank Vizard, the Fastskin suits reduce drag by up to four per cent. Speedo adapted this new fabric technology for the 2006 Winter Olympics. The full-bodied Fastskin FSII Ice suits were debuted by the silver medal winning American women's bobsled team.

By the time the bobsledders were given the opportunity to don their Fastskin suits, the line had already gone through several evolutions including the Fastskin FS-II and Fastskin FS-Pro. From the very beginning, these drag reducing suits were met with great resistance. At issue was Fédération Internationale de Natation (FINA) rule 10.7, which stated "No swimmer shall use any device that may aid his speed, buoyancy, or endurance during a competition (such as webbed gloves, flippers, fins etc). Goggles may be worn". Early in 2000, Speedo hand-delivered their new Fastskin suits to 150 Olympic hopefuls and promised 6,000 more would be made available for Olympic trials. Fearing the possibility of Speedo-clad race winners being stripped of medals due to challenges, the Australian Olympic Committee (AOC) asked the Court of Arbitration for Sport to examine the legality of the FINA-sanctioned suits. In May that year, a CAS-appointed arbitrator backed the FINA ruling allowing use of the suits for Olympic tryouts. Australian Olympic Committee president John Coates, however, said in a press conference that their swimmers would be allowed to wear the futuristic neck to ankle covering suits, but would do so "at their own risk". Coates later stated that the ruling he sought was whether the suits should be classified as costumes or devices.

Professor Emeritus of Exercise and Nutritional sciences at San Diego State University, Brent S. Rushall claimed in a report sent to CAS that the suits were – by FINA's definition and based on manufacturer's claims – in fact devices, rather than costumes and are therefore in violation of the FINA rule, which disallows equipment such as fins or flippers. In the report, Rushall equally criticises Adidas (who had a similarly designed bodysuit) and Speedo for giving FINA members presents and declares that these members should recuse themselves from ruling on the legality of these suits.

Ultimately, the suits were approved for use in the Sydney Olympics and in December 2000 the super-suit earned a place on Popular Science's "100 Best of What's New", alongside the US Navy's F-16 replacement and Kodak's Smart Digital Picture Frame with built-in modem.

Four years later, the FSII debuted in the Athens summer games. While this next stage in swimwear evolution was quickly approved by FINA, it was not without controversy. Speedo competitor TYR developed a similar full body suit with detached sleeves, which the company calls Aqua Bands. Both TYR's detached Aqua bands and Speedo FSII's attached sleeves are designed to essentially "grip" the water on the inner forearm. TYR maintained that essentially the only difference between their suit and Speedo's was whether the sleeves were attached. Despite this, FINA did not approve TYR's armbands. In 2004, 47 medals were won by swimmers wearing Fastskin II.

In late 2011, in time for the holiday season, Speedo introduced a new Fastskin3 suit. This suit comes in two styles, Elite and Super Elite. Speedo developed the Fastskin3 as a racing "system", consisting of a newly introduced cap, goggles, and competition suit. Michael Phelps is the principal advertiser for the Fastskin3 line of suits, as Ryan Lochte has been reported to prefer the older Fastskin LZR Elite suits. In succession to the LZR Pro and Elite, Speedo switched the branding for their technical suits from "Fastskin LZR Racer" to "Fastskin", continuing the trend they left off in 2008 when they debuted the LZR Racer. The male suit is available as a normal-cut suit and a high-waisted suit that utilises the space in between the belly button and waist of the male swimmer. The core of Speedo's advertising campaign for the new line touted the benefits of "becoming one" with the suit. Speedo advertises up to 16.6% drag reduction and 11% improved oxygen economy. The system was sold featuring "fit point markers", allowing the swimmer to line up the suit, cap, and goggles to achieve an ideal fit and appearance. FINA approved this suit shortly after it was launched, and the suit was anticipated to be used at the London 2012 Olympics by a majority of athletes, along with the Arena PowerSkin Carbon Pro suit, which debuted in early 2012. However, a series of high-profile seam failures and high costs for poor performance gain meant that the suit was a commercial failure. Most swimmers, including Phelps, ended up using a revamped version of the LZR Elite. The cap and a cut-down version of the "Super Elite" goggles are still sold today.

As of the Rio 2016 Olympics, Speedo's lineup of suits consisted of its flagship "LZR Racer X", known for an "x" pattern of silver kinetic taping; a second generation Elite dubbed the "LZR Elite 2"; and an entry-level "LZR Pro". The LZR X performed slightly better than the FS3 in terms of swimmer preference, but Speedo failed to capture much attention at the Games as Mizuno, a Japanese manufacturer, had introduced a new suit (the "GX-Sonic III") designed to circumvent the FINA regulations and aid the swimmer in new ways. Specifically, the Mizuno suit comes in two variants: a sprinter ("ST") variant with stiff taping on the inside of the suit along the hamstrings, designed to help the upbeat of a kick at the end of a race as a swimmer's energy fades, while the multi-racer ("MR") uses two layers of the FINA-approved textile to decrease air permeability drastically, thereby trapping considerable excess air and making a swimmer more buoyant just like with the original LZR Racer (see below). Not much marketing material has appeared in the West, as the GX-Sonic has only been primarily aimed at the small Japanese market and required special importing internationally, so there are no numerical performance claims available, but many unsigned standout swimmers like Joseph Schooling (since signed by Speedo), Caeleb Dressel (since signed by Speedo), and Anthony Ervin (signed by Finis but allowed to choose his own suit) chose to wear the Mizuno suit over any of Speedo's offerings and won many golds in that suit. Additionally, the de facto trademark appearance of some collegiate teams like the Texas Longhorns at the NCAA National Championships is in Mizuno now, as opposed to Speedo.

To combat the rapid uprise of choosing Mizuno among high-performing swimmers, Speedo released a new lineup of suits in 2019, in advance of the Tokyo 2020 Olympics. Dubbed the "LZR PURE" collection, the lineup consists of two suits: a new high-end LZR Pure Intent, designed to replace the LZR Racer X, borrowing many technologies like hamstring taping from Mizuno's suits, and intended to compete with Mizuno's ST variant of their GX-Sonic series; and a flexible LZR Pure Valor, designed to replace the LZR Elite 2 and compete with the dual-layered MR variant of the GX-Sonic series. Speedo has also released new goggles and a rebranded FS3 cap to go along with the launch.

==== LZR Racer ====
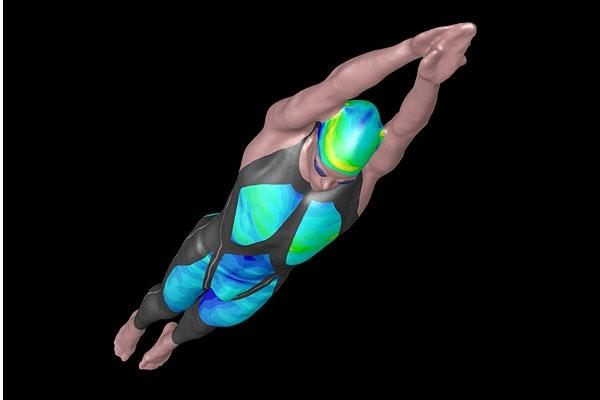
NASA computer image used in development of the Speedo LZR Racer

Speedo's most controversial move came with 2008's unveiling of the LZR (pronounced "laser") Racer. The super smooth suit, which was optimised with the help of NASA wind tunnels, uses welded seams and multiple woven fabrics to reduce drag by up to six per cent. In addition, the LZR, like the Fastskin, utilises a core stabiliser, which acts almost as a girdle, to reduce muscle movement. This was designed to help the swimmer maintain the proper angle in the water for longer periods of time. Popular Science magazine named the suit one of their "100 Best of What's New '08" list, calling it "The fastest swimsuit in the world". Subsequent research revealed another reason for the suit's success: tiny air bubbles tended to be trapped between the swimmer's body and the suit, lifting the swimmer slightly so that they benefited from lower friction against air as compared to water.

Speedo's website boasts that the LZR Racer was "so fast, it was banned from competition". Indeed, the LZR Racer was banned from international competition by FINA in 2009, along with all full-body polyurethane suits. Men's suits were also banned from extending above the waist or below the knee. Women's suits could not extend past the shoulders or go below the knee. However, by that time, swimmers wearing the suit had already broken at least 46 world records.

FINA's ban on the LZR Racer and all "hi-tech" suits came shortly before Michael Phelps's 200 meter freestyle loss to Germany's Paul Biedermann at the 2009 FINA World Aquatics Championships in Rome, Italy. Wearing Arena's polyurethane X-Glide suit, Biedermann broke two world records that day and beat Phelps by more than one second. Even though FINA had already approved the ban, it had not been scheduled to go into effect until the following spring. The delay in FINA's hi-tech prohibition and Phelps's unexpected second-place finish (his first loss since 2005) led Phelps's coach Bob Bowman to threaten a boycott of international swim competitions. In the first three days of the eight-day competition, 15 world records were set.

I'm done with this. It has to be implemented immediately. The sport is in shambles right now and they better do something or they're going to lose their guy who fills these seats. That would be my recommendation to him, to not swim internationally... The mess needs to be stopped right now. This can't go on any further.

— Bob Bowman, Associated Press

The vague decision by swimming's governing body stated that suit materials would need to be textile, rather than polymer-based, but offered no specific deadline for this changeover to occur. The reason for the delay, FINA executive director Cornel Marculescu told the AP, is to give manufacturers enough time "to pass from polyurethane to textiles". The ambiguity continued when FINA was unable to define textile. The most specific aspect of the ruling returned men to bare chests and ladies to bare shoulders. The current rule (GR 5.4), as posted on FINA's website, states "Before any swimwear of new design, construction or material is used in competition, the manufacturer of such swimwear must submit the swimwear to FINA and obtain approval of FINA".

Speedo's latest version of the LZR Racer series, the LZR Racer Elite, carries the FINA stamp of approval. The Elite series, like its predecessor utilises welded seams and compression material to sculpt the swimmer's body. The SpeedoUSA website specifically denies the new generation of LZR Racers is a "quick fix". The most recent list of FINA approved swimsuits, which was published in January 2011 lists 78 specific Speedo brand swimsuits among 45 worldwide brands and nearly 720 models. Among them, 71 are Fastskin models and 13 are LZR series suits. Several Speedo designs have been removed from the FINA list including the original LZR Racer, and multiple Fastskin models.

FINA's ban on LZR Racers left Speedo with a significant surplus stock. The obsolete competition suits have found new life, though. London's Chelsea College of Art and Design received a donation of 600 suits, 200 of which were turned into the Chelsea Xpo Pavilion as part of the 2010 London Festival of Architecture project. The pavilion can be seen on the college's campus at the Rootstein Hopkins Parade Ground.

Another collaboration between Speedo and academia netted a line of designer fashions. Teams of students from the London College of Fashion, University College Falmouth and the University of Huddersfield have reused the material to create a complete fashion line including casual slacks, jackets, and even different forms of swimwear.

This was not the company's first foray into recycled high fashion, though. In September 2010, sustainable fashion label, From Somewhere announced a new line of dresses made from Speedo's surplus.

== Online resources ==
=== YouTube channel ===
Speedo started its YouTube channel dedicated to Speedo and its products specifically in the context of "life in and around the water" on 2 March 2007. One of the initial videos was aimed at journalists and providing them with a literal and virtual feel for what the athletes wearing the LZR Racer at the 2008 Summer Olympics felt by letting members of the media try the suits on in person in Beijing and sharing that experience virtually via YouTube. For swimmers, videos posted cover a wide range of topics including swimming technique overviews and breaking down the process of designing and making swimwear. Speedo's channel also features high profile athletes at different points of their journey as a professional swimmer such as at the end of a World Championships.

== Sponsorships ==
=== Olympic Committees ===
Team	Nation	Expires	Ref
Olympic Committee of Israel	Israel	N/A	

=== National teams ===
Speedo is the sponsor of several national swim teams.

Team	Nation	Expires	Ref
Swimming Canada	Canada	N/A	
Diving Plongeon Canada	Canada	N/A	
Synchro Canada	Canada	N/A	
Canadian Water Polo Association	Canada	N/A	
Colombian Federation of Swimming	Colombia	N/A	
Finnish Swimming Association	Finland	N/A	
Hong Kong Amateur Swimming Association	Hong Kong	N/A	
Icelandic Swimming Association	Iceland	2012	
Israel Swimming Association	Israel	N/A	
Japan Swimming Federation	Japan	N/A	
Mexican Swimming Federation	Mexico	N/A	
Romanian Water Polo Association	Romania	N/A	
Royal Spanish Swimming Federation	Spain	2014	
British Swimming	United Kingdom	2016	

Speedo also offers sponsorships to some High School and College (NCAA, NAIA, Junior college) Leagues as well as non-profit recreation leagues such as YMCA and Boys and Girls Clubs.

== Sponsored athletes ==
In addition to team and league sponsorships, these are the several celebrity athletes that are currently being sponsored by Speedo.

Country	Name	Discipline
France	Gilot, Fabien	Freestyle
Belgium	Timmers, Pieter	Freestyle
Denmark	Blume, Pernille	Freestyle
South Korea	Kim, Seo-yeong	Individual Medley
Ukraine	Romanchuk, Mykhailo	Freestyle
China	Li, Zhuhao	Butterfly
China	Yan, Zibei	Breaststroke
China	Ye, Shiwen	Individual Medley
China	Zhu, Menghui	Freestyle
China	Liu, Yaxin	Backstroke
Canada	Thormeyer, Markus	Backstroke, Freestyle
Russia	Chupkov, Anton	Breaststroke
United Kingdom	Anderson, Freya	Freestyle
United Kingdom	Dean, Thomas	Medley, Freestyle
Netherlands	Heemskerk, Femke	Freestyle
Russia	Efimova, Yuliya	Breaststroke
Italy	Magnini, Filippo	Freestyle
United States	Franklin, Missy	Backstroke
United States	Meili, Katie	Breaststroke
Canada	Masse, Kylie	Backstroke
United States	Cordes, Kevin	Breaststroke
Australia	Horton, Mack	Freestyle
United States	Jones, Cullen	Freestyle
United States	Adrian, Nathan	Freestyle
Australia	Packard, Jake	Breaststroke
United States	Beisel, Elizabeth	Individual Medley
United Kingdom	O'Connor, Siobhan-Marie	Individual Medley
Australia	Wilson, Matthew	Breaststroke
Australia	Winnington, Elijah	Freestyle
Australia	Throssell, Brianna	Butterfly, Freestyle
Australia	Lewis, Clyde	Individual Medley, Freestyle
Australia	McKeon, David	Freestyle
Australia	McKeown, Kaylee	Backstroke
Australia	Atherton, Minna	Backstroke
Australia	Titmus, Ariarne	Freestyle
United Kingdom	Scott, Duncan	Freestyle
Australia	McKeon, Emma	Butterfly, Freestyle
Denmark	Blume, Pernille	Freestyle
United Kingdom	Carlin, Jazz	Freestyle
Spain	Belmonte Garcia, Mireia	Butterfly, Freestyle, Individual Medley
United States	Murphy, Ryan	Backstroke
United States	Flickinger, Hali	Butterfly, Individual Medley
United States	Dressel, Caeleb	Butterfly, Freestyle, Individual Medley
United States	Miller, Cody	Breaststroke
United States	Curtiss, David	Freestyle
United Kingdom	Peaty, Adam	Breaststroke
Australia	Simpson, Cody	Butterfly

== See also ==
- High-technology swimwear fabric
- List of generic and genericised trademarks
- List of swimwear brands
- Tyr Sport, Inc. – Speedo's chief American competitor in the performance swimwear market.
- Warnaco Group – Speedo's exclusive North American licensee
