= The Janice Dickinson Modeling Agency season 3 =

The Janice Dickinson Modeling Agency
- Season 3
- Starring: Janice Dickinson; Peter Hamm; Nathan Fields; Gabrial Geismar; Duke Snyder
- No. of episodes: 10

Release
- Original network: Oxygen Network
- Original release: December 4, 2007

Season chronology
- ← Previous; Season 2 Next → Season 4

The third season of The Janice Dickinson Modeling Agency debuted on Oxygen on December 4, 2007.

== Episode 3.1: La Vida Janice ==
Janice opens season 3 with a recap of some of the jobs her models have landed since the end of season 2, noting especially J. P. Calderon and Dominic Figlio's success with 2(x)ist underwear. Dominic is offered a one-year contract as "the face of 2(x)ist."

A new client, VIP Latino magazine, meets with Janice seeking Latina and Latino models for a cover shoot with Carlos Mencia. Janice, realizing that she's lacking in the Latin model department, holds an open casting call.

T. J. Wilk meets with Janice and Peter to let them know that he's leaving the agency. In part it is because his success with Janice has opened up other opportunities in modeling and acting and in part because he doesn't trust Janice's business partner Peter.

Janice decides she needs a bodyguard. She hires Sorin, a former model with the agency, to serve as her personal security.

During the Latin casting call, Janice decides to open a Latin division, specializing in what she sees as an untapped market. Among the new Latin models are CC Fontana, Alexandra Jay, Nadia Alexandria, Grasie Mercedes, Crystal Winston and Rodrigo De Carli. The clients return to see the new models and select CC, Nadia and Grasie. At the shoot, however, scheduling conflicts cause the clients to change from a cover shoot to an inside feature spread instead.

== Episode 3.2: Mo' Models, Mo' Problems ==
When Janice arrives at the VIP Latino shoot and learns that her models have lost the cover, she leaps into the shoot. She reasons that her celebrity status will land her, and thus her models, on the cover.

Stina Jeffers informs Janice that she's signed with another agency. An affronted Janice believes that she's losing models because Peter isn't managing them properly. Peter later interviews that he's made a concerted effort to stay out of confrontations with Janice because of how wearing it is on both of them.

Janice holds another open call and hires several new models. One of the new potential models, Grant Whitney Harvey, is existing model Brian Kehoe's roommate. He mentions that he already has an agent in Los Angeles and Janice rejects him. Grant is soon dropped from his other agency and Janice decides to hire him. Janice is delighted by the return of Braneka Bassett, a model she would have hired previously had she been out of high school. Braneka, now having graduated, is hired. Other new models include Payton Brady, Alexis Hutt and Erika Wilhite. Janice is concerned by the large number of scars on Alexis' body.

At a casting for Fashion L. A. magazine, Crystal Trueheart, Ligia and Nyabel are cast and Janice learns that Desirée Bick has severe anemia. Janice clashes with Traci Moslenko, who Janice believes has put on too much weight.

== Episode 3.3: Zero Tolerance ==
Crystal Trueheart returns to Los Angeles and meets Chris Jones, who is surprised to learn she is sleeping in her car. He invites her to move in with him. Later, she and Nyabel pose for the Fashion L. A. photo spread and are thrilled to finally be working together.

Dominique Sharpe, a server at California Pizza Kitchen, is spotted by Janice, who calls her in for an audition. Her walk is bad but Janice hires her.

Janice calls in the men for a casting for Go Softwear underwear. The clients hire six of her models for underwear, swimwear and athletic gear.

Open Your Eyes, a men's magazine catering to the Latino market, books CC, Nadia and Toi. Janice arrives at the shoot and is excited to learn that the models will be posing with comedian Joey Medina but is surprised that the magazine has hired a fourth model. Nadia and Toi, on her first shoot, initially struggle but eventually relax.

At the Go Softwear shoot, Janice is infuriated to learn that Kehoe has shown up for the shoot drunk. She slaps him and tells him off. Later, Chris Jones squirts Kehoe with a squirt gun, soaking the one-of-a-kind underwear that he's wearing. Janice orders them off the job, but the client later calls Kehoe back. Despite the problems Janice is pleased with the pictures.

Seeking to lower her models' inhibitions, Janice books several of them as nude life models for a senior citizen art class. Several of the models are initially uncomfortable but loosen up. Dominique, however, objects because of her Catholic upbringing and Janice interviews that Dominique may not have what it takes.

== Episode 3.4: Of Models and Morals ==
Janice compromises with Dominique, allowing her to go topless but keep her panties on. Dominique still feels uncomfortable with nudity and along with fellow agency model Michael Anderson (who had expressed issues with nudity previously) seeks out "Models4Jesus," a support group for Christian models. Several Models4Jesus representatives meet with Janice, who listens to their concerns but stands by her contention that nudity is part of modeling.

The new syndicated game show Temptation call auditions for male and female models for the show. Janice brings in The Price Is Right model Phire Dawson to teach her models classical prize modeling moves, but the Temptation producers inform the models that this isn't the sort of modeling they're looking for. After disqualifying a number of the models for having tattoos and some for being too young, the producers hire Michael Anderson and Christian Prelle for the show.

Men's underwear designer Andrew Christian is launching a new line for women and hires a number of the models, including Dominique and boyfriends Shaun McCarron and Paul Anderson. At the shoot, Dominique is confronted by her nudity issues when the client requests that she remove her top while posing in a pool. She complies and Janice interviews that Dominique has a clean slate with her.

Swimwear designer Ashley Paige hires several of the models, including Dominique and Alexis, for a new catalog. Her concept for the shoot is that the models are girls misbehaving at a slumber/beach party. At the shoot, the designer notices the scarring on Alexis' body and accuses her of being a cutter. Alexis laughingly denies it. When Janice arrives to watch the shoot, the designer asks her to don a suit and play the mother figure of the girls at the party. Janice initially refuses, saying she's not prepared to model swimwear. The designer continues to cajole her and Janice, to keep the client happy, agrees, but not before calling the client a "parrot." As Janice is posing, she becomes increasingly cranky with the client's constant direction and clashes with her repeatedly.

== Episode 3.5: Model Mayhem ==
Janice and Ashley continue to clash until Ashley realizes that she has to deal with Janice not just as a model but as the agent of the other models. With this realization the shoot goes much more smoothly. While at the shoot Janice confronts Alexis about her scarring. Alexis acknowledges that she used to be a cutter but no longer is. Janice shares about her abusive father and extracts a promise from Alexis to come to her if she feels the need to hurt herself again.

Genlux magazine wants to cast 3-4 high fashion models. The clients initially are interested in Desirée Bick, who has worked with the magazine before. However, when they discuss her later Janice badmouths her, saying she can't stand her and that she has a horrible attitude. Peter interviews about her dismay at Janice's conduct in front of the clients. The magazine selects Crystal Trueheart, Lakiska and Daria.

At the Genlux shoot, Janice has issues with all three. She interviews that Crystal has lost too much weight, berates Lakiska for failing to show emotional depth on the shoot and chides Daria for marrying her boyfriend, who doesn't support her modeling career. Crystal agrees that she's worried about her weight but Daria resents Janice's intrusion into her personal life.

Several of the models have a poker party at Chris Jones' place. The question of Kehoe's sexuality comes up again. He insists that he's straight but again several others doubt him.

Nathan returns from a European vacation and learns of the agency's new Latin division. He meets with his father, Simon Fields, who is a business partner of Jennifer Lopez. Nathan suggests that the new division would be a good fit for Lopez's new clothing line, Just Sweet. Simon agrees and Nathan sets up a meeting with some of Lopez's people. They schedule a "go-see" to view Janice's models. The Just Sweet people are impressed with the models and interview that they believe they will be able to use them in some upcoming campaigns.

Rufskin, a company specializing in denim outer- and underwear for the gay market, wants three models for a new web campaign. J. P. becomes very uncomfortable, interviewing that he's concerned that he will be typecast for gay jobs. Ultimately he is not hired, with the clients choosing Danny, Michael, Maurice and Christian instead.

At the Rufskin shoot, Janice is perturbed to find that the client is serving champagne to the models, given her own history of alcohol abuse. She confronts Maurice for pouring himself a second drink, threatening to fire him should she ever find him drinking on a set again.

== Episode 3.6: Under Pressure ==
The Rufskin shoot, by photographer Justin Monroe, progresses with the models being put in very provocative poses. Peter Hamm comments to the clients that despite the many gay models in the agency, they manages to select all straight models. Each of the models interviews about the challenges of posing with other males (Danny Nuñez especially noting his bemusement at the number of gay-themed jobs he books) but the client is very pleased with the pictures.

Nathan, having nursed a crush on Traci Moslenko for some time, finally asks her out. He's nervous about a one-on-one date, so he asks J. P. to double-date with him. Nathan sets J. P. up with recent addition Rodrigo De Carli, whom J. P. hadn't met previously. J. P. and Rodrigo make a romantic connection and agree to go out again. When Janice hears that Nathan and Traci went out, she calls them each in separately and forbids them from seeing each other.

Charles Bernard, creator of the acne treatment Sensiclear, approaches Janice looking for models with bad skin. He plans to place them on the Sensiclear regimen and select one of them to serve as the company spokesmodel in an infomercial. Janice holds an open call and also selects some of her existing models to audition. A number of auditioners, including existing model CC and potential new model Lynette Nechayeva, break down emotionally as they describe the impact of suffering from acne. CC, Lynette and several other models are chosen.

Tia Browsh, owner of the Jack Henry boutique, wants to hire three models. They will wear each of the items in her store and a Polaroid picture of them in the outfit will serve as the item's price tag. Crystal, Nyabel and Erika Wilhite book the job. At the shoot, Erika struggles and the client grows impatient with her.

== Episode 3.7: Under the Knife ==
As Erika continues to struggle, Tia advises Janice that she needs to be replaced. Ligia Rodrigues is called in. Janice advises Erika to study the other models on the shoot and interviews that she still believes in her.

Janice calls in the models to meet with Dan Mathews of People for the Ethical Treatment of Animals. She advises the models that the agency is now "fur-free" and shows them a video illustrating the treatment of animals raised for fur. In support of PETA's "I'd rather go naked than wear fur" campaign, Janice advises the models that they have the chance to participate in a naked protest march. Ligia announces that she will not participate in the march and will continue to wear fur. Several of the models harangue her for her decision but she stands by it. At the march, Brian Kehoe risks arrest by going completely naked.

Edward Dada of the Dragonfly clothing line, who had previously shot with the agency, returns seeking models who resemble dead rock stars for a new campaign. New model Maria Bernaldez draws Janice's ire when she speaks to the client. The client selects twelve models.

Janice visits Dr. Frank Ryan to have a tummy tuck. Interviewing about her disdain for actresses and models who lie about having surgery, Janice invites Access Hollywood, The Insider and People magazine to cover it.

Because she is recovering from her surgery, Janice is unable to be at the Dragonfly shoot. Several of the models are on their first shoot and are disappointed by her absence, but Peter is there in her place. Although Payton struggles briefly with his portrayal of Elvis Presley, overall the shoot goes well.

The Sensiclear hopefuls meet with Charles Ber. With Janice still recovering, Nathan is there in her place. CC from the agency and Tom, Megan and Eli Jane from the open call are chosen as the finalists for the campaign. Eli wins the contract to be the "face of Sensiclear" and the other three are booked for the infomercial.

Christian Audigier with the Ed Hardy clothing line meets with Janice (who is disobeying doctor's orders) to book models for a trade show in Las Vegas. CC, Desirée, Lakiska, Daria and Lisa Riddle book the job for the women. Maria is disgruntled at not booking another job. As Christian is about to announce his picks among the men, Peter bursts in to announce that two of his likely picks, J. P. and Dominic, are already committed to 2(x)ist.

== Episode 3.8: Las Vegas or Bust ==
Peter informs Janice that Dominic is booked by 2(x)ist and J. P. is on hold for the client so they can't be booked for the Ed Hardy show. A perturbed Janice orders Peter away and Ed Hardy designer Christian Audigier books the two models anyway, along with several additional models.

Brian Kehoe takes Traci on a romantic date in the mountains. He backs off, however, when he learns that Traci had gone on a date with Nathan, not wanting to "step on [Nathan's] toes."

In Las Vegas, the models lounge around the Venetian Hotel pool. Desirée is stand-offish with the other models, interviewing that she doesn't care to associate with them. J. P. gets to know new model Payton better. Janice arrives poolside and orders the models to refrain from drinking.

J. P. and Rodrigo share a room; they each interview about the awkwardness of the situation. J. P. interviews that he is not ready to pursue a relationship with anyone and he's hoping to avoid the whole situation. Later, Rodrigo rides a gondola with CC. Rodrigo tells her that he's still interested in J. P..

Janice is embarrassed to learn that Dominic is indeed double-booked for 2(x)ist and Ed Hardy. Jason Scarlatti of 2(x)ist graciously agrees to allow Dominic to leave the 2(x)ist booth to walk for the Ed Hardy show in exchange for making up the time at a later date. Jason notes the confusion he feels when he gets different stories from each of them.

The models arrive at a party thrown by Christian Audigier but Desirée is a no-show. She arrives much later, after Janice has left, and leaves shortly thereafter.

The next day, the models walk for Ed Hardy, in fashions with a Mad Max theme. Peter arrives for the show, to Janice's indifference. He interviews that he's learned the less they speak the better they get along. Janice upbraids Desirée before the show for her tardiness to the previous night's party and her general attitude. Despite that friction, the show is a success.

Janice interviews that with her vision for the agency continuing to clash with Peter's, with complaints coming from the models and complaints from clients, she's decided that there needs to be a change. Back in Los Angeles, Janice calls a meeting of all of the models without Peter. She tells them that everything is about to change.

== Episode 3.9: Destination: Miami (part 1) ==
Janice tells the models of her general displeasure with her arrangement with Peter. This prompts several of the models to express their own displeasure, citing perceived financial improprieties which, in cutaway interview segments, Peter explains. Janice also expresses displeasure with some of her models, saying that some are under-performing. A tardy Maria Bernaldez enters the agency and Janice fires her on the spot. Janice then announces her intention to take a number of the models to Miami in pursuit international client Custo Barcelona and with the notion of possibly establishing a branch office in that city.

Crystal Trueheart leaves for a modeling assignment in Hong Kong and interviews that she will then return to New York City. A saddened Chris Jones interviews that he will miss her, but shortly thereafter he becomes interested in seeing Alexis Hutt.

Janice meets with Otto Models and forms an alliance with that agency to further her plan to remove Peter.

In Miami, Custo Barcelona takes a preliminary look at the models. CC is upset to learn that Traci failed to tell her about the casting. The two later get into an angry confrontation.

Janice arranges for the models to attend a party with a number of influential fashion industry insiders. She is infuriated to once again catch Brian Kehoe drinking and orders him to leave the party. She is able to book a number of the models for several jobs. This includes booking Alexis for a number of shoots, although Janice notices Alexis has fresh scars on her body.

As a special treat, Janice takes the models out to dinner. At the dinner several of the models stand and pay tribute to Janice. After dinner she treats the models to a surprise salsa dancing lesson. Finally, she takes the models to a local club and surprises them with the news that they will be performing an impromptu fashion show for Ed Hardy. The models are flabbergasted that Janice would book them the night before their enormously important casting.

== Episode 3.10: Destination: Miami (part 2) ==
Despite their surprise, the models perform well at the Ed Hardy fashion show. At the next day's Custo Barcelona casting, the clients select J. P., Chris Jones and Payton of the men and Alexis, Desirée and Nadia among the women. Kehoe provokes controversy by showing up in an aussieBum swimsuit, a client that had fired the agency. An incensed Janice cuts the suit right off Kehoe's body. Janice and the clients clash over whether the models will be paid for the fitting. Janice interviews that she's fighting for her models while Peter interviews about the difficulty in smoothing things over with alienated clients. Ultimately the clients decide, since they are paying for the models anyway for the fitting, to just go ahead and book them.

That night the models go out to a local gay club called Halo. Kehoe's sexuality is again called into question. Chris learns that Alexis will be remaining in Miami for several months and each of them interviews that the difficulty of maintaining a cross-country relationship has led them to decide not to attempt it.

At the Custo Barcelona shoot the models are initially performing below par. The photographer pushes them and as the day progresses they improve. Janice and the models are surprised to learn that the shoot is two days, not one. Janice interviews that Peter again failed to communicate with her and J. P. interviews that no one is sure how much they are being paid for the job. The models confront Peter that night, who allays some of their concerns about the money.

Following a final interview about her issues with Peter, Janice and her attorney meet with Peter to advise him that Janice wishes to dissolve the partnership. Janice signs the paperwork to end it and Peter leaves. He interviews that breaking up the business may not be as easy as Janice expects, as she may not even own the rights to the name "Janice Dickinson Modeling Agency." A jubilant Janice then announces to her models that Peter has been asked to leave.
