= The Janice Dickinson Modeling Agency season 2 =

The Janice Dickinson Modeling Agency
- Season 2
- Starring: Janice Dickinson; Peter Hamm; Nathan Fields; Savannah Dickinson; Gabrial Geismar; Duke Snyder
- No. of episodes: 9

Release
- Original network: Oxygen Network
- Original release: January 10 – March 13, 2007

Season chronology
- ← Previous; Season 1 Next → Season 3

This article contains episode summaries and other information pertaining to the second season of the reality television series The Janice Dickinson Modeling Agency. The season premiered January 10, 2007.

== Episode 2.1: Model Mutiny ==
Janice returns from vacation to find several models upset at the way her partner Peter Hamm has been conducting business in her absence. Chris Vanek interviews that he's seen Peter out with some of the female models and that those models seem to be getting bookings. Nyabel clashes loudly with Peter over not being called for any bookings. After the grievances are aired, Janice congratulates some models for their recent successes: T.J. Wilk has landed the cover of DNA Magazine; Natalie has a multi-page magazine spread; Fargo has become one of the top ten downloaded models from the Maxim website. Following the group meeting, Janice and Peter meet with Paul Ramirez, who leaves the agency despite Janice and Peter's refusing to let him out of his contract, and with Timika Robinson, who announces that she's pregnant. Janice decides to hold an open casting call to expand her roster.

Peter brings in several models, including Erin Naas and Pamela Carey, that he's trying to steal from other agencies. Janice, Duke and Gabe are unenthusiastic. Janice interviews that she has always envisioned her agency serving very high-end clients while Peter wants to fill up the roster with commercial types. Janice and Nathan discuss the situation and Nathan suggests that she create a "boutique" division and one for more commercial bookings. Janice agrees and puts Nathan in charge of the commercial division.

Janice brings her models, including Pamela and Erin, to a casting session for designer Alan Del Rosario. He selects several models, including Erin and, for her first booking, Nyabel.

Some 3,000 hopefuls appear for the agency's open casting call. Janice picks out a handful to return the next day, including Survivor: Cook Islands contestant J.P. Calderon. Things get ugly when a biracial man accuses Janice of not choosing enough black men and he and Janice get into a screaming match. Upon reviewing the day's picks, Peter expresses his concern that there are too many high fashion types and not enough commercial models, and that there are too many men and not enough women.

Janice attends the Mercedes-Benz Fashion Week and expresses her pride in her models, especially Nyabel. She interviews that if Nyabel is successful it is likely that she will move from the "New Faces" testing board to the "Management Board" roster. Fifteen minutes before the show Janice learns that Erin has not shown up. Peter claims he emailed the client that Erin was unavailable but the client says that was not clear. Crystal takes on Erin's outfits but Alan is not pleased. Nyabel steals the show on the runway and Janice and Alan are quite happy with her. Other models do not fare as well, especially Crystal, and Janice expresses concern.

== Episode 2.2: Callbacks ==
Janice and Peter meet with representatives of "Fashion for the Cure," a breast cancer awareness organization. They ask her to emcee the annual charity fashion show. A new find of Peter's, Desirée Bick, shows up for the casting and Janice throws her out for wearing the wrong shoes. Two more of his finds, Traci and Natalie, are also there to Janice's displeasure because they're too short. Traci especially bothers Janice with her walk but Janice sees potential. The clients book Crystal, Stina, Pierce, Natalie and Nyabel. Unfortunately, Peter has double-booked Crystal so she has to drop out of the charity show. Peter invites Desirée back in and Janice agrees to a trial period.

Janice takes her models to hair stylist Kevin Josephson for some new hairdos. Before Crystal's cut, Janice reads her an email from Alan Del Rosario with a devastating critique of Crystal's performance. Janice learns that several of the models have booked other jobs and is furious. They tell her that Peter knew about it and Janice leaves an angry voice mail for him, telling him that if he books another model without her consent she'll find another partner.

Janice calls in Dr. Lillian Glass in hopes of resolving her communication problems with Peter. The three have a session and Janice and Peter agree to make "Janice and Peter Time" each day to improve their relationship.

Janice meets her models at the Fashion for the Cure event. Traci has substituted for Crystal. Janice tells the models how important it is to give something back. The show goes well and designer Lauren Alexander is pleased. After the show, Peter approaches Nyabel and congratulates her on her work at Fashion Week.

At the callbacks, 53 new potential models return. Janice and another photographer shoot pictures in various states of undress. A six-foot self-described "computer geek" named Kate Heffernan is discovered loitering outside and Janice is thrilled by her. Following the photo shoots the agency discusses the hopefuls. Nathan and Janice clash over a potential named Mariana. Nathan wants her for the commercial division but Janice vetoes her to Nathan's frustration.

Of the men, Janice selects Jonathan Cox, Johan Cederstrand, Chris Strandburg, Robert Naughton, Andrew Brett (who was cut in season 1) and J.P. Calderon for the Management board and Brian Kehoe for the Testing board. Of the women, she chooses Lakiska Finger, Ligia Rodrigues, Lisa Riddle, Jordan Condra, Jordan Lee and Kate for the Management board. She tells another hopeful, Braneka, that she would have chosen her but she wants her to graduate first. Gabe interviews that he thinks the existing women will feel threatened by the new recruits. Peter interviews about his worry that Janice continues to pick "artsy" models who won't make them any money. Janice interviews about how productive the casting session was and talks about some of the clients that she's pursuing and the revenue they could generate.

== Episode 2.3: In with the New ==
Janice warns the existing female models about the new models she's hired and introduces the new group to the old. As the old and new models walk, Janice interviews that Crystal won't book any more fashion shows until she fixes her problem of looking down on the runway. Several existing models interview that they feel like Janice is pitting them against the new girls. Timika clashes with Janice and decides to leave the agency.

Peter and former model booker Kodi Foster sit down with Janice over Kodi's concerns over the money he believes he's owed. Janice and Kodi also clash and Janice agrees to take his claims to her lawyer for review.

Crystal and Stina are excited to see their spread in Bride & Bloom magazine. However, after reviewing the photos Crystal becomes critical of her appearance. Stina offers encouragement. Crystal takes the pictures to Janice, who tells her how much she likes them and that Crystal needs to work on her self-esteem.

The new and the existing male models are brought together by Janice at a fitness center to be evaluated by trainer Andre Hudson. Andre pits Marcus Foy and J.P. against each other in a push up contest but Marcus quits after a handful, to Janice's displeasure. More pairs of old and new models face off and the new models prevail. Andre puts all the models through a brutal workout and Janice interviews that the new models have better attitudes.

Several of the male models perform at a charity event for KIIS-FM hosted by Ryan Seacrest and Lisa Rinna. The boys are to model designer handbags for a "pick your purse party," but John Stallings is an hour late. Larry King drops by and interviews the models. The show goes well and the organizer is thrilled. J.P. and Brian strike up a friendship.

Mike Wood, editor-in-chief of Instinct magazine, approaches Janice about putting J.P. on the cover of the February swimsuit issue, along with a feature story in the magazine. The catch is that Instinct only features openly gay men on the cover and Janice doesn't know if J.P. is gay. Janice calls in J.P. to make him the offer.

== Episode 2.4: Fight or Flight ==
J.P. agrees to the Instinct cover story, thereby coming out as gay, although he expresses concern about being stereotyped as un-masculine. He interviews that he "hates" himself and hopes that this experience will help him deal with his self-loathing.

Nathan books his first job as head of the commercial division with the International Fight League for models to serve as "ring girls" for an event in Portland. Janice sees this as a test of the concept of having a commercial division. They meet with Kurt Otto and Gareb Shamus of the IFC but Janice clashes with them over the whole idea and the low fee. Stina and Pierce object to the job and Janice excuses them. Erin arrives late and Janice, Erin and Peter argue in front of the clients about her tardiness. The clients book Fargo, Desirée and Erin.

J.P. selects the wardrobe for his Instinct photoshoot and interviews that he is frightened and insecure. Janice shows up to provide moral support and encouragement. J.P. struggles physically in the pool and Janice jumps in to help hold him up. J.P. interviews that the shoot has helped him become more comfortable with himself.

Nathan calls the ring girl models to advise them of the itinerary. Desirée expresses discomfort at the idea of seeing naked fighters at the weigh-in. Erin tells Nathan that she's booked a national commercial and is dropping the job. Nathan calls the clients, and they select Natalie to replace her.

The models, Janice, Nathan and Peter fly to Portland, where Janice continues to complain about the outfits and the fees. During the weigh-in the ring girls hold towels in front of the fighters to keep them from being exposed. One of the fighters causes his towel to drop, leading Desirée to leave the stage and Janice to take the other two away. Janice comforts Desirée and interviews that she may pull her models from the job.

At the next day's rehearsal, Desirée has difficulty with her direction and gets upset. The clients shuffle the models but express grave concern.

Stina, Pierce and the ring girls prepare for a photo shoot but Gabe and Nathan clash over Nathan's not leaving enough time to prepare. Stina and Pierce interview that they were upset that the ring girls are taking time from their shoots and the ring girls feel resentment that Stina and Pierce didn't have to audition. Peter interviews about his concern about the division Janice is creating between the "fashion" models and the commercial models. Janice berates Stina during the shoot, accusing her of "over-thinking."

Lori, the "official" IFL ring girl, arrives to help Janice's models at the main event. Janice gets caught up in the excitement of the event and interviews that despite her issues with the job it's been overall a positive. The evening is marred by Stina's telling Peter that she's leaving the agency. Peter and Stina discuss it and Janice joins in the argument. Stina interviews that if things don't change she will have to leave.

== Episode 2.5: In Bed With the Client ==
Janice meets with Wynn and Donna Katz of Linea Pelle, a "casual, edgy" clothing line. Donna chooses T.J. Wilk and Wynn books Stina and Fargo for the Fall 2007 campaign.

Janice and Peter book a studio for a photo shoot to build the models' portfolios. Janice says that some of the models are "on the fence" for remaining with the agency and lashes out at Marcus for "mocking" her. A special "guest model," a large snake, arrives by limo to be shot with the models. Later she brings out a tarantula. Janice says that posing with the animals shows how the models work under pressure. Marcus refuses to pose with the snake and Janice fires him, but then allows him to return and he poses. Jordan Lee poses and after posing has what Janice describes as a "diva hissy," telling Janice that Peter confronted her over drinking a soda and her need to lose weight.

Photographer Logan Alexander brings in photos of the five weakest models: Brian; Lakiska; Kate; Desirée; and Andrew. She brings in the models and reviews the shots with them. She brings the five to the Los Angeles Zoo in hopes of "releasing their spirits" by emulating the animals. Lakiska struggles.

Stina visits her mother and discusses her career with the agency. Stina interviews that she's not sure if Janice is hard on her because she is frustrated with her or is trying to help her develop.

Janice brings in fitness trainer Tracy Effinger in to help the models Janice thinks have the worst problems with their rear ends and thighs. During the "butt blasting" exercise session, Janice pulls Stina aside and bluntly asks if she's leaving the agency. Stina explains that she felt "attacked" in front of the client in Oregon. Janice apologizes but advises that it will probably happen again. Stina decides to stay.

Janice expresses her concern about Jordan Lee's attitude and physical presence. She calls Jordan in and releases her from the agency.

At the Linea Pelle shoot, Donna expresses concern at Fargo's look and Janice wonders what's behind it. Donna says she may have to let Fargo go. When Janice goes looking for her she finds her "between T.J.'s legs." Janice sets in needling Donna and later catches Donna and T.J. kissing. She confronts T.J. and asks him flat out if he's sleeping with the client.

== Episode 2.6: Beauty Has Its Price ==
T.J. confirms that he's dating the client. The shoot continues to be strained until Fargo is dressed in less provocative clothes. Donna interviews that Fargo looks "classier" now and better represents the line. Janice interviews that she's not thrilled about models dating clients but as long as the checks keep coming in she'll "look the other way."

Nyabel schedules a meeting with Janice at which she accuses Peter of playing favorites among the female models. Janice brings Peter into the meeting and Nyabel repeats the accusation, suggesting that it is racism on Peter's part. Peter defends himself, explaining that the vast majority of the casting calls are not looking for black models. He also states that Nyabel has not had a strong enough portfolio to be sent on casting calls, but that this has improved to the point where he can send her on any call. Nyabel is satisfied by his explanation.

Janice schedules several of her models for a day at the spa and the dentist. Janice has some work done herself and has a number of procedures done on Jordan Condra.

A new client, Hardcore Watch Company, wants five male and five female models. Blonde Desirée is initially hired but then the client recalls working with Fargo and hires her as the blonde instead. However, the day of the shoot Fargo is booked on another job so Desirée books it after all. Also at the shoot are Chris Jones and Crystal, who, it is learned, had dated for several months. Crystal wanted to get more serious than Chris so they split.

At their apartment, roommates Chris Jones and Andrew clash. Andrew accuses Chris of being lazy and not taking modeling seriously, while Chris says Andrew loses his confidence after every rejection.

Another new client want to book one male and one female model for a six-week contract in Tokyo for a lump sum of $10,000. Andrew is very excited, as he has wanted to go to Japan for years and has even taken Japanese lessons. The client books Crystal and John Stallings. She then decides to book one more male, and Andrew is crushed when Chris Jones is chosen as the second male model to go to Japan. Crystal, however, is excited to learn that Chris has booked the job, taking it as a sign that their relationship might get back on track.

== Episode 2.7: Measure Up ==
Janice meets with representatives of aussieBum, an Australian underwear manufacturer. The clients want 5 male models, who will split a $10,000 fee between them. To give the client the widest possible choice, Janice and Peter hold an open casting at West Hollywood gay club The Abbey, attended by The Abbey's owner Richard Cooley and celebrity gossipmonger Perez Hilton. Peter interviews about his discomfort at reviewing nearly-naked male models but the team ends up selecting a few models to present. Janice and Peter also bring back Sorin from season 1.

VISIONS, a magazine targeted to the African American community, wants several models (a rare casting call exclusively for black models). Marcus, Lakiska and Nyabel book the job. Nyabel and Marcus do well but Lakiska continues to struggle. Marcus later sets up a photo shoot to build his portfolio but arrives very late because he was working on his rap album instead.

J.P. and T.J. meet at The Abbey for lunch and T.J. brings along a copy of J.P.'s Instinct. They talk about how the other models might accept J.P. after coming out. During lunch a man approaches J.P., introducing himself as a former People en Español editor. He thanks J.P. for coming out and sharing his story. J.P. interviews that he is happier being out than he has ever been.

Dragonfly, a "rock and roll" clothing line, wants two male and two female models. Andrew interviews that he is very eager to book the job because of his long-standing interest in rock music and is devastated when he is passed over again in favor of Chris Jones. During the casting, Crystal interviews about her concern that the agency is moving away from high fashion work and into purely commercial jobs.

At the aussieBum casting at The Abbey, Marcus becomes ill and throws up. Janice, concerned about a flu that's going around, tells him to go home. He argues and she threatens to have him removed by security. As the models are lined up for the client, Marcus sneaks into line. Janice and Peter initially decide to let it pass instead of causing a scene. But when Marcus steps out of line to introduce himself to the client, Janice angrily confronts him. She fires him on the spot.

== Episode 2.8: You're Fired ==
Janice and Marcus continue their confrontation and Peter escorts Marcus out. Marcus vows that he will return to the agency. Back at the casting, Sean from aussieBum refers to Janice as a "bitch." He interviews that "bitch" is a compliment in Australia. She asks him to rephrase and he refuses. Janice's agitation continues when she notices that Sean's people are videotaping everything and when Sean criticizes her models. Finally Sean acknowledges that he's pleased with the selection.

Marcus arrives at the agency with an apology and roses for Janice. She accepts the flowers but refuses to allow him back.

At the aussieBum callbacks, Sean selects ten models for a photoshoot before making his final selections. Peter interviews that this is unusual but because of the size of the contract the agency will jump through more hoops. He selects Dominic Figlio, Biagio DeSimone, Ali Jones, Bernardo Coppolla and Bo from the Abbey casting and Sorin, J.P., Billy, Kehoe and T.J. from her existing models.

At the final photoshoot, Sean angrily confronts Janice over the comments she'd made behind his back which his people had caught on tape. Her efforts to save the situation are to no avail and he fires the agency.

With the departure of Sean and aussieBum, Janice calls Jason Scarlatti from 2(x)ist to offer him the models. He agrees and Janice and the models use the studio Sean paid for to shoot the models. Desirée Bick stops by to meet a photographer and ends up posing with Dominic. Jason views the photos and selects seven models for an upcoming campaign to be shot on Catalina: Kehoe; Dominic; T.J.; Maurice Townsell; Biagio; J.P.; and Sorin.

The day before the Catalina shoot the models hit the gym for some last-minute work. T.J. and J.P. are concerned when they discover Kehoe ingesting what he describes as an herbal supplement fat burner. At dinner that night the men discuss which of the female models they find most attractive. After dinner several island residents show up to party with the guys.

== Episode 2.9: Crash and Return ==
The season finale opens as Janice arrives on Catalina for the shoot and is perturbed to learn that her models are an hour late. The shoot goes well, although the client calls Kehoe "bloated." Kehoe says he's learned not to mix business and pleasure.

Returning from the shoot, Janice is involved in a car accident, breaking the windshield with her head and being hospitalized with a concussion. Nathan informs Peter the next morning, saying that Janice was "adamant" that he keep her meeting with a new client, Trashy Lingerie. He informs the models, who are stunned.

Trashy Lingerie selects Ligia, Desirée, Crystal, Stina, Traci and Pierce for a test shoot to narrow the field to two. Following the casting Nathan takes the six for a celebration that Janice arranged. After dinner and waxes Nathan leads them to a hotel suite. They are not thrilled to see a stripper pole. Janice calls to explain that the pole is there to help them loosen up for the next day's lingerie shoot and suggests that those who don't want to dance may need to rethink their place with the agency. Following Janice's call all of the models except Desirée decide to participate. Following the pole dancing lessons the Catalina models show up (following a call from Nathan) to party with the girls. Crystal and Ligia are upset that the boys stay too late.

The test shoot gets underway and the models are pleasantly surprised that Janice is able to make it. The clients select Desirée and Ligia. Stina is upset but Janice and the client reassure her that she would have been picked had she fit into a size small. This comforts Stina.

The season closes with Janice interviewing at her amazement at the pace her agency is progressing. Over a montage of jobs from the past two seasons, Janice voice overs that she has more work to do and hints at plans for future expansion.
