= The Janice Dickinson Modeling Agency season 1 =

The Janice Dickinson Modeling Agency
- Season 1
- Starring: Janice Dickinson; Peter Hamm; Nathan Fields; Savannah Dickinson; Gabrial Geismar; Duke Snyder
- No. of episodes: 12

Release
- Original network: Oxygen Network
- Original release: June 6 – August 15, 2006

Season chronology
- Next → Season 2

This article contains episode summaries and other information pertaining to the first season of the reality television series The Janice Dickinson Modeling Agency.

== Episode 1: In the Beginning ==
Janice's agency opens with a general casting call from people all over the world. Approximately 500 people respond, and from these, she chooses five to continue as Americas Next Top Models. Particular attention is paid to one Theresa Cutie, an 18-year-old whom Janice met on the street. Although Theresa is homeless, Janice feels that she is confident and beautiful, declaring their meeting a "perfect fashion moment". Theresa was invited to the casting call, and she came.

== Episode 2: Get Down to Business ==
Janice searches for a business associate. She also holds an invitation-only casting call. She also fires the triplets who served as her personal assistants for refusing to help set up her MySpace web page. She begins to have some doubts about her business acumen.

== Episode 3: Cut the Fat ==
Janice and her new partner, Peter Hamm, discuss the merits of her models. She feels that they are all full of potential, although acknowledges significant work must be done to get them camera ready. Peter singles out Nyabel and Lauren for being "large" and Janice gives them two weeks to lose weight. Particular attention is paid to Sorin Mihalache, who arrives late, displeasing Janice. At her insistence, he removes his clothing and poses nude. She declares him "camera ready" amid general applause from the other models. Theresa Cutie is dismissed from the agency after missing an appointment for a plastic surgery consultation without calling Janice.

== Episode 4: First Job... ==
Janice holds another open casting call with close to 1,000 people responding. Peter and Janice clash over one potential model, "Fargo." Peter thinks she's perfect for lad mags like Maxim and FHM. Janice thinks the agency should go for a different sort of job but gives in. Janice brings in Claudia Charriez (whom Janice met when judging the 'America's Next Top Transsexual Model' episode of The Tyra Banks Show) and Peter discovers "the next Kate Moss" walking through the mall. The agency books its first job modelling shoes and Peter's faith in "Fargo" is rewarded when she's selected as one of the models.

== Episode 5: NYC ==
Janice and her male models meet with executives from underwear company 2(x)ist. They want three models for an event in New York City. Initially very interested in Sorin, the execs decide against him because of his lack of fluency in English. Sorin is very disappointed but Janice and Peter console him. 2(x)ist selects T.J. Wilk, Paul Ramirez and John Stallings. Before the trip, Janice and son Nathan clash over her outfit and his commitment to his schooling versus the agency, and he ends up not going on the trip.

Before the 2(x)ist "gallery show," Janice and the models tour Times Square and are beset by fans and paparazzi. Suddenly, the models are spontaneously hired by a department store to be "living mannequins" in the store window and on the sidewalk. That night at the gallery, the models strip down and circulate among the crowd, similar to the shoe show from episode 4. At one point Janice directs them to climb up on a table so the room can get a better view of "the package."

Back in Los Angeles, Janice and Nathan reconcile and all is apparently forgiven.

== Episode 6: It's Official ==
Janice holds a red carpet ribbon cutting ceremony to celebrate the opening of her agency. In preparation she lands couture designer Kai Milla to dress three of her female models and Elmer Ave. to dress some of the males. Milla selects Timika Robinson, Crystal Trueheart and Stina Jeffers.

Janice travels to Palm Springs where she's been crowned Queen of the annual White Party. She's wearing a one-of-a-kind Kai Milla dress by head designer Rubin Singer, who coincidentally is at the party. Janice destroys the Italian linen dress by jumping into a fountain for an impromptu photo session, much to the displeasure of Rubin. Janice claims it was an accident.

Back at the agency, Janice and Peter hire Kodi Foster as a talent booker.

It's the day of the ribbon cutting and the Kai Milla dresses haven't arrived, and neither has Janice. Peter scrambles to smooth over the problems and convinces Rubin to deliver the dresses. With Janice finally in place, the three women in their Kai Milla dresses and the men in both Elmer Ave. and 2(x)ist, Janice and her models meet the gathered press and cut the ribbon.

== Episode 7: Vegas, Baby ==
Janice, Peter and booker Kodi Foster meet with representatives from 1-800-DENTIST, a national dental referral service. They are casting for a national television commercial. Sorin again struggles with his English in the audition. Andrew Brett, Grayce Pedersen, Tony Perez, Paul Ramirez and Natalie Winsell book the job.

Janice and Peter travel to Las Vegas for Model Search America, an enormous cattle call for potential models. On day one of the event, Janice has to be rushed to the emergency room with a scratched cornea, leaving Peter to review models alone. Sporting an eyepatch, Janice arrives at the call to a thunderous ovation. Janice is especially taken with 16-year-old Brittany Picozzi and invites her to return to the next day's callback. Brittany and her mother return the next day and Janice invites her to join the agency. Peter is late to day two and he and Janice clash, stressing their relationship.

At the 1-800-DENTIST shoot, Andrew and Tony are an hour late. Fred, the director, initially decides to recast them but when they arrive allows them another chance. The shoot is a success and Janice says Fred called her to tell her how pleased he was with all the models.

== Episode 8: All About the Runway ==
Several models are hired for a "rock and roll fashion show" to launch the Virgin Megastore clothing line. Janice is concerned that her models are lacking the proper runway presence, so she brings in drag queens to teach them to walk. Several of the male models express confusion at how "men in girls' clothing" will be helpful in showing them how to "walk like a man." John Stallings steps up and helps the guys out. Next Janice brings in twin belly dancers to teach the models movement. This involves ordering the models to take off their clothes.

Janice clashes repeatedly with Niki Shadrow, the producer and stylist. At the fitting, Janice expresses dissatisfaction with several of the outfit choices Niki makes. On the day of the show, Janice is very concerned about the length of the runway and angered by Niki's instructions to her models on how to walk and pose. Despite the conflicts, the show goes off smoothly and while Niki isn't entirely pleased she says she still loves Janice.

== Episode 9: Signed, Sealed, Delivered ==
Some of Janice's models are cast in a "very funny bowling movie" called 7-10 Split. Ten models are selected to appear in a fashion show segment featuring clothes designed by former tattoo artist Don Ed Hardy. Several more models are also cast to appear in print ads for the clothing line. Grayce Pederson is upset when she is not cast, prompting T.J. Bates to comfort her. Another model is suspicious that T.J. is just using it as an excuse to hit on Grayce, a suspicion somewhat borne out by T.J.'s serially dating several of the models. Janice is displeased to learn that T.J. is dating other models.

Before the movie shoot, aspiring rapper Marcus Foy visits Capitol Records to try to secure a distribution deal for his CD. He neglected to make an appointment and so is rebuffed. He did meet someone on the street who claimed to be a record promoter and they exchanged information.

At the movie shoot the art director had planned on leading off the segment with Marcus. However, Marcus was eating at the crafts service table rather than attending the run-through, so he was put at the back of the lineup by stylist Raymundo Baltazar. The movie shoot went smoothly as did the photo shoot. Peter Hamm convinced the photographer to book double the number of models for the photo shoot than he'd originally planned. Janice opined that the client was pleased with all the models but that she'd noticed some models got multiple bookings while others got none. She said she might have to start cutting models who aren't making money for the agency.

== Episode 10: Step It Up ==
Janice and Peter meet with Kevin Black of Interscope Records, who is looking to book some models for a CD release party for R&B artist Avant. Janice is excited because a successful party could lead to jobs posing for album covers, music videos and other opportunities. Janice chooses four models but is disgusted at the party because she feels the models aren't dancing and moving well.

Janice goes for her yearly mammogram and gets a clean bill of health. While she's being tested, Peter and Kodi meet with William Ford from Frederick's of Hollywood seeking catalogue models. The meeting does not go well as William doesn't feel that the models are curvy enough for Frederick's. When Janice returns to the agency, Peter feels Janice is disrespecting him and slams the table. Janice and Peter get into a shoving match and Janice threatens to quit. She says she feels threatened when men respond aggressively because of her history of childhood abuse. She is also upset because she feels Peter has been pushing "Fargo" over Janice's continued objections. The agency ends up not booking the Frederick's job.

Janice, Peter, and Kobi meet again with Kevin Black, with Avant expressing by telephone his displeasure with the models from the party. Janice is angered that her models are characterized as "B-list" and gives them a pep talk. The models appear before Kevin and initially the meeting does not go well. Kevin is unimpressed with them and Janice falls off her chair. Kevin says the models are "A-list" and chooses Stina and Pierce but Janice remains concerned that her female models are not impressing potential clients.

At the video shoot for the song Lie About Us, Avant is pleased by the selected models. Stina is initially concerned that the shoot will be overly sexual but ends up all right with the shoot. Janice expresses her satisfaction with landing Interscope but her concern about losing Frederick's. Janice believes that she needs "sexy" female models to be able to serve a wider base of clients.

== Episode 11: Get The Picture ==
Everyone at the agency is concerned over the lack of "high-end" models and so Janice has Kodi set up another open casting call. Meanwhile, Janice sends Stina, Brittany, Petra, Crystal and Trisha to be photographed by Mathu Anderson. She hopes that the photographs will help the agency sell the models to more higher-end clients. Mathu is very pleased with them.

"Fargo" meets with Janice and Peter to let them know that Brittany and her mother Suzi are thinking about leaving the agency. Brittany got many callbacks from the American Model Search and they're concerned that they could do better with another agency. They bring Brittany and Suzi in and Janice lets them know how eager they are to keep Brittany and develop her. Brittany stays with the agency and Janice asks them not to discuss other offers with the rest of the models.

Janice books a job for herself in Puerto Rico and on the way she stops by Universal Studios Florida with Nathan and Savannah. At the shoot she works with photographer Ivan Batisto for the cover of Escape magazine.

The open casting call is disastrous, with none of the models showing any potential. Peter feels that Los Angeles is a "picked-over market" and that future searches will need to be nationwide.

Mathu Anderson stops by with the results of the photo shoot. Everyone is ecstatic with most of the results, except for some of Stina and Petra's shots. In an effort to cement Brittany with the agency, Janice sets up a special showing of her photos with her and her mother, and they are thrilled. Janice tells Brittany that she was born to model and is the sort of model who drives the industry.

Janice reveals that she has been borrowing money from Peter to keep the agency afloat and that she has decided that it's time to drop the models who will not earn money for the agency.

== Episode 12: The Axe Falls ==
In the season finale, Janice is very stressed over continuing to be in the red and decides that drastic cuts are in order. She calls in all the models to tell them that she's going to do a one-on-one photo shoot with each of them and based on the shoots will be deciding which models will remain and who will be cut.

At Brittany's shoot, her mother announces that the family will be vacationing in Paris. Janice knows this means that Brittany will be seeking work in Europe and if she hits it big there she won't come back. Janice expresses concern about Sorin, citing his accent and difficulty with rejection. Janice puts "Fargo" in high fashion-type clothes and makeup and is surprised at the transformation. She photographs Claudia in a male persona, "Claude."

Janice decides to shoot a number of the models naked. She feels that models have to be comfortable with their bodies and refusing to pose nude means that they aren't comfortable. Rather than pose nude, Grayce Pederson quits.

Following the shoots, Janice, Peter, Kodi, Gabe and Duke go through the photos and make the cuts. They split the models into three groups: "Management," meaning they will be presented to potential clients worldwide; "New Faces," meaning the agency will continue to work to develop them; and cut.

Janice cuts Sorin, Chrisanne, Petra, Brenda Kimani, Andrew and Claudia on-camera. Although it's not stated explicitly, presumably all other models not put on the "Management" and "New Faces" lists are also cut.

Janice brings the remaining models to Sunset Boulevard to announce the "Management" and "New Faces" boards. Pierce, Crystal, Tony, "Fargo," Chris Jones, Stina, John Stallings, Adrian, Sarah, Paul Ramirez, Natalie, Chris Vanek, Maurice, Billy and T.J. Wilk go on the "Management" board. Marlon, T.J. Bates, Lauren, Bryan, Timika, Marcus, Ben and Nyabel go on the "New Faces" board. The "Management board" models (including Brittany, who is not present) appear on an electronic billboard on Sunset Boulevard.

== Models ==
=== The "Management Board" roster ===
Name	Age 1	Sex	Hometown
Sarah Eisele	18	Female	Hesperia, California
Jenny "Fargo" Gilbertson	23	Female	Fargo, North Dakota
Adrian Gonzales	19	Male	Cutler, California
Kristina "Stina" Jeffers	23	Female	Altadena, California
Christopher Jones	25	Male	Falls Church, Virginia
William "Billy" Marquart, Jr.	19	Male	Quincy, Illinois
Tony K. Perez	25	Male	Honolulu, Hawaii
Brittany Picozzi ^{2}	16	Female	Las Vegas, Nevada
Paul Ramirez	26	Male	Denver, Colorado
Pierce Ross	19	Female	Las Vegas, Nevada
John Stallings	26	Male	Sandy, Utah
Maurice Townsell	25	Male	Reno, Nevada
Crystal Truehart	18	Female	Northampton, Massachusetts
Christopher Vanek	20	Male	Van Nuys, California
Terry "TJ" Wilk	21	Male	Cleveland, Ohio
Natalie Winsell	20	Female	Newport Beach, California

^{1} Ages are according to The Janice Dickinson Modeling Agency's model profiles and are presumed to be correct at the time of filming.
^{2} Not mentioned in season finale, but was shown on the Sunset Boulevard electronic billboard.

=== The "New Faces" roster ===
Name	Age^{1}	Sex	Hometown
T.J. Bates	25	Male	Wanship, Utah
Marcus Foy	23	Male	New Orleans, Louisiana
Ben Gallenson	21	Male	Santa Rosa, California
Nyabel Lual	24	Female	Nasir, Sudan
Bryan McMullin	20	Male	Placerville, California
Timika Robinson	22	Female	Riverside, California
Lauren Wasser	18	Female	San Diego, California
Marlon Yates	18	Male	Los Angeles, California

^{1} Ages are according to The Janice Dickinson Modeling Agency's model profiles and are presumed to be correct at the time of filming.
