= The Janice Dickinson Modeling Agency season 4 =

The Janice Dickinson Modeling Agency
- Season 4
- Starring: Janice Dickinson; Nathan Fields; Gabrial Geismar; Duke Snyder
- No. of episodes: 10

Release
- Original network: Oxygen Network
- Original release: August 28, 2008

Season chronology
- ← Previous; Season 3

The fourth season of The Janice Dickinson Modeling Agency premiered on the Oxygen Network on August 28, 2008.

== Episode 4.1: A New Beginning ==
Having ended her business relationship with Peter Hamm, Peter is replaced by Jason Otto (Otto Models) a more accommodating partner and divided up the models between them. Janice holds an open casting call, she hires several new models, including a deaf man named Martin Ritchie.

Janice decides to open a "model house" and move several of her models in, allowing her to work with them intensively. Her business manager advises her that she can't afford both the house and her office, so she decides to close the office and re-open the agency in the house. She also decides to move in. Finding the master suite hideous, she calls on her friend, designer Christopher Ciccone, to redecorate it. His makeover includes installing spy cameras throughout the house wired into Janice's bedroom.

Swimwear designer Nicolita Sainz is looking for one male and one female model to be the "face of Nicolita". She selects CC, Traci and new model Polina for photo tests and hires new model Chandler Maness for the male role.

Janice summons the existing models to the house, and they start choosing bedrooms and taking advantage of the amenities. Janice arrives with the new models in tow, and the existing models learn to their consternation that the new models will be living at the house.

== Episode 4.2: Out with the Old...In with the New ==
After trying to mollify the existing models over her selection of the new models, Janice begins "Model 101" with the new models. A review of the new models' bodies leads her to conclude that everyone needs work. She sets up Xian and Chandler to go running together, which pleases them because they are attracted to each other. She then adds Hazuki to the exercise team.

Traci and Polina join Chandler at the Nicolita shoot, but CC arrives late. CC's tardiness puts the shoot about two hours behind, but she interviews that it was unavoidable. She got her period the morning of the shoot and after going home to change got stuck in traffic. Traci raises Janice's ire by bringing her acting agent to the shoot. Janice interviews about all of the problems she's had with Traci, then tells Traci that they need to talk. Despite being late, CC books the shoot and becomes the "Face of Nicolita".

Janice recognizes that her existing models are still resentful over not being invited to live in the house so she throws a party for all of the models. At the party, Janice congratulates CC but warns her not to be late to another shoot. She takes each of the Nicolita girl finalists aside to speak privately. She advises Traci that she must choose between being a model and an actress and gives her two weeks to get into shape. She congratulates Polina on her confidence and tells CC that she is going to be pushing her hard.

Janice invites Crystal Truehart and Maurice Townsell to move into the house, Crystal because Janice believes her to be a high fashion model and Maurice because she believes his macho attitude will help the "effeminate" male models become more masculine. Kehoe pulls her aside and asks her to live in the house because he is between places (no mention is made of his season 3 roommate, Grant). She expresses reservations about his behaviour. Meanwhile, Maurice and Polina find themselves attracted to each other.

While Janice does a shoot for Orbit, Nathan runs a casting call for Kentucky Denim jeans. The client selects Christian, Kehoe, Dominic, Martin, and Chandler from among the men and Dominique and Polina to serve as "background".

To break the ice between the models, Janice decrees that they will all dress in drag. Everyone participates except Chandler, who clashes with Kehoe over Chandler's refusal. Eventually, Chandler decides to slip into a bra and panties. Kehoe, jealous of the attention Chandler is getting, tries to move in on Xian. Kehoe and Chandler each interview how annoying each finds the other.

== Episode 4.3: A Menace in the House ==
Janice invites Traci to move into the house so she can monitor her weight. Traci, noting the number of jobs she has booked, considers Janice's concerns about her weight to be a joke.

At the Kentucky Denim shoot, Martin is initially apprehensive that his hearing impairment will cause difficulties. The client, however, is very happy with his performance.

Janice invites cosmetic dentist Bill Dorfman to the house to examine the models' smiles. Polina is especially excited at the thought of having her teeth fixed. Following the exams, Janice is surprised with a special dinner prepared by Xian. After dinner, Janice has Hazuki cut her long hair short.

Several of the models interview that Kehoe is disruptive. The final straw comes when he makes a joke about using cocaine that Janice overhears. Janice ejects him from the house.

== Episode 4.4: Men in Tights ==
Kehoe is ejected from the house, and worries he may have to sleep in his car. J. P. (with whom he joined the agency) asks him where the Kehoe he used to know has gone. He tells him if he wants to continue being a model with the agency he needs to find the old Kehoe.

Janice wakes the models up early the next morning to exercise before a client, Tinte Cosmetics, arrives for a casting. While talking to Maurice, she finds empty carrot cake boxes and throat spray under Polina's bed. Worried that she could be developing an eating disorder she has a chat with Polina who says she can eat what she likes and never puts on weight and that she has a bad throat due to smoking. Still worried, but trusting Polina, Janice lets it go but tells her that she is always there if she needs to talk.

The Tinte Cosmetics representatives arrive and ask to see the girls with no makeup, then set them a makeup challenge, Xian, Crystal and Dominique are chosen for the campaign, however Dominique is double booked. Janice fires her from the agency, then re-hires her after she apologizes for not letting Janice know the situation. Nadia replaces Dominique for the Tinte job.

Janice wants the male models to work on their movement so she orders them into dance belts and tights for a ballet lesson. Martin is initially frustrated because he can't read the instructor's lips from his position, but soon moves to the front and has greater success. J. P. is deemed the best dancer and Payton the worst. Janice moves them, along with Danny, into the house.

Payton clashes with Gabe and Janice, overhearing part of the exchange, orders Payton out. She relents upon learning that Gabe was also engaging in name-calling and Gabe is shocked that Janice would take Payton's side against him.

At the shoot the girls are getting ready when Kehoe walks onto the set.

== Episode 4.5: Love Is a Four-Letter Word ==
Kehoe invades the Tinte shoot to try to make his case to Janet, who rejects him again. Janice convinces the client to do some test shots with Hazuki, although they do not commit to using her in the ad campaign. The client selects Xian to be the "face of Tinte"

Janice's daughter Savannah arrives at the model house and, supposedly needing help with her homework, questions the models on United States history. Following the questioning, a love note from one model to another is slipped under Janice's door. The client has Traci pose topless and she is concerned because of Janice's repeated suggestions that she is fat.

Janice brings in her yoga instructor to help the models with their flexibility but many of the models struggle with the postures.

Ed Hardy representatives call upon Janice again and book Payton to be the spokesmodel for the company's new underwear line. At the shoot they also book Gavyn, Traci and Paul to serve as "background models" in the shoot.

Through her hidden camera array, Janice discovers that Chandler and Xian are romantically involved. Janice meets with Xian to advise her against becoming involved with fellow models. Maurice also expresses his interest in Polina; he cooks her dinner but Polina is uninterested in a relationship because she already has a boyfriend.

Kehoe returns yet again and Janice refuses to see him.

Sorin and Crystal exchange back massages and Janice catches them on her hidden camera. The next morning, she angrily confronts Sorin and orders him to stay away from the models.

== Episode 4.6: Designer Cracks the Whip ==
Couturier Merlin Castell to cast girls for a Barbarella-themed fashion show. Janice interviews about her excitement at the potential of landing a high-fashion client. Merlin is dissatisfied with the models, saying they are too large and do not walk well, but he agrees to give the agency another chance.

Chandler disparages Traci and Janice catches him on hidden camera. Janice confronts him and he promises not to make such comments again.

Merlin returns to fit his outfits to the models. He sees a little potential in some of them but thinks they would require a lot of work. He shocks Crystal, the one model Janice considers high-fashion, by calling her too commercial, but agrees to give her another chance. Finally he hires her. He also hires Pierce, CC, Polina, Nadia, Erika, Selina, Mia, and Hazuki.

Janice brings in performance coach Cindera Che to teach the female models how to move. Janice interviews that she remains concerned with Traci's attitude. Merlin drops in unexpectedly and Janice invites him to watch the lesson. Then the men return and Cindera incorporates them into the lesson. Crystal chooses to partner with Chandler, to Sorin and Xian's displeasure. Xian retaliates by choosing Danny over Chandler. Maurice is excited that Polina chose him. Cindera selects Xian as the best student.

After the class, Sorin finds out that Chandler and Crystal slept together in the back yard. With his limited English, he does not understand that they slept next to each other, not that they had sex. Sorin creates a scene and embarrasses Crystal, Xian and Chandler. Sorin apologizes to Crystal and Crystal and Chandler and Xian and Chandler talk things out. Meanwhile, Paul expresses his feelings for Traci, who based on past instructions from Janice, turns him down.

At the rehearsal for his show, Merlin remains worried that the models will not be able to deliver what he wants. He paints their faces chalk white and demonstrates a series of moves he expects them to make on the runway, including deep back bends. Several of the models have difficulty with the bend. Nevertheless, they all perform well at the show and the client interviews that he will definitely hire them again.

== Episode 4.7: Livin' Large ==
Seven 'til Midnight, a new client specializing in costume-type lingerie, attend a casting for their new line. They cast Dominic, Xian and Selina. The client then shocks Janice by asking to see some plus-size models. With the client threatening to go elsewhere, Nathan scrambles to locate three models, Amber, Alana and Ivory. The client books Ivory.

At the Seven 'til Midnight shoot, the client is very impressed with Ivory, less so with Dominic. Janice interviews that she is adamantly opposed to plus-size models because she has worked her entire career to remain thin. Nathan takes Janice aside and explains to her that plus-size models are needed to keep the agency afloat. Janice lets Ivory know how pleased the client is with her and then has to leave. The plus-size models spark a spirited discussion among several of the existing models about diet, body type and weight issues. Xian in particular mentions that she is happy with her body and will not make herself unhealthy for the sake of modeling.

Returning client Andrew Christian wants two men and one woman to model a new product inspired by Danny's previous photo shoot. The product is a boxer brief with built-in support for the wearer's backside. During the casting, Janice surprises Xian by dismissing her for not being toned. Andrew selects Nadia, Dominic and Christian. At the shoot, Andrew asks Janice if Nadia will pose topless. Nadia agrees as long as the set is closed. Andrew interviews that he is very pleased again with all of Janice's models and would definitely continue to work with the agency.

Nathan invites the plus-size models to move into the house. He interviews that he wants to make them feel they are part of the agency and have access to everything the agency offers. He moves them into a room, but without enough beds in the house, Paul is displaced. Several of the existing models check out the situation and Chandler and Alana immediately clash.

== Episode 4.8: Size Does Matter ==
While Chandler and Alana continue to clash and Janice agonizes about the plus-size division, Martin tells the plus models that he empathizes with their struggle, comparing their struggles with his own struggles as a deaf model.

Representatives of PLUS Model magazine arrive at the house for a casting. Janice initially bolts from the casting but, to support Nathan, returns. However, she continues to argue against the idea of plus-size modeling with her models in front of the client. Despite the conflict, creative director Mia Amber hires Ivory and Alana. Janice arrives at the shoot during Alana's final look and criticizes Alana. Publicist Lizzie Grubman arrives at the shoot and tries to mediate between Janice and Mia, but Janice remains resistant. Lizzie returns to the house with Janice and tries to convince her to relocate to New York City.

Danny and Chandler clash over the affections of Xian. Danny acts aggressively but Chandler interviews that he has no intention of jeopardizing his place with the agency by fighting. Xian interviews that she is simply a flirt.

Janice and models Dominique, Gavyn and Kehoe are hired for a book by photographer Justin Monroe called "Down the Rabbit Hole". Before the shoot, Janice advises Kehoe that she is not prepared to work with him and orders him off the shoot. Danny replaces him and Kehoe tries to figure out how to get back to Los Angeles. The shoot, despite being named for an Alice in Wonderland concept, has a Wizard of Oz theme.

Swimwear designers Parke & Ronen arrive at the house for a casting and hire Michael, Christian, Peyton and Maurice. The shoot is the day after the exhausting Justin Monroe shoot and Janice, feeling ill, declines to attend the shoot. Ronen becomes very agitated by Janice's absence. They argue by phone and Janice hangs up on him.

== Episode 4.9: Everything Is About to Change ==
J. P. expresses his desire to take a new step in his career and Janice promotes him to become an agent.

Janice confronts the models about their behaviour in the house, revealing her hidden camera setup.

Janice meets with Todd Michael Krim of Reality Cares, a charity organization composed of reality television stars, to book about 14 models for a "green" fashion show. All of the clothes are made of recycled materials.

Janice fires Traci, stating that she's more interested in being an actress than a model. She also fires Alana and Ivory for not fitting her dream of being high fashion. Amber quits in support of her fellow plus size models.

Janice gathers the models and announces that she is moving to New York City to further her vision of creating a high fashion boutique agency. She tells Crystal that she is taking her to New York and tells J. P. that he will be the head of the New York men's division. Nathan remains behind, although the future of the Los Angeles agency remains unclear.

== Episode 4.10: Reunited and it Feels so Good ==
Janice and the models reunite. Janice airs footage from the series and from her hidden cameras and several of the models are abashed at the revelations. Janice subjects Brian Kehoe to a lie detector test to determine if he is straight or gay. The results indicate that he is straight, but has previously kissed another man.
