= Jockstraps in gay male culture =

History of the jockstrap as attire for gay men

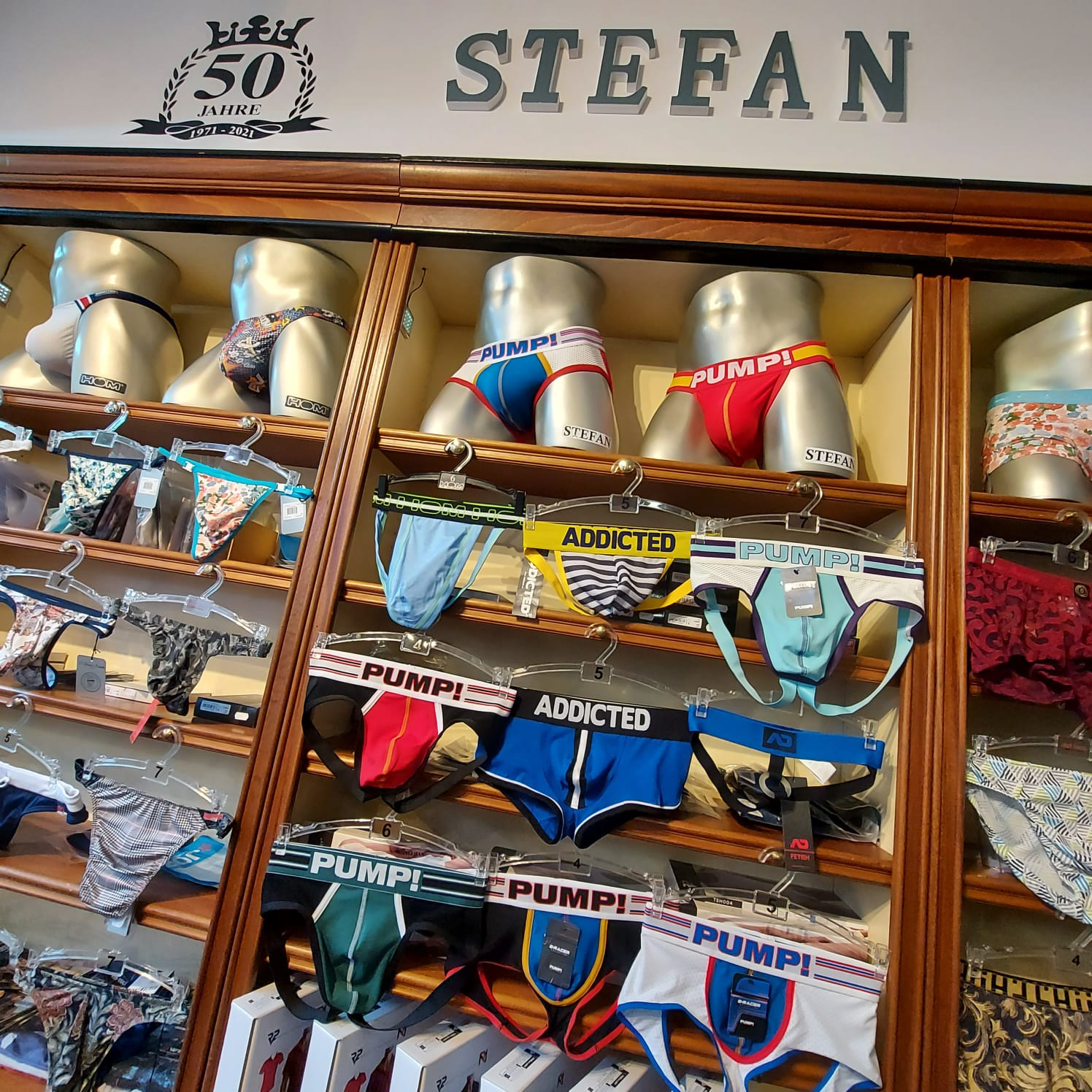
Selection of different jockstraps as fashionable men's underwear without jockstrap protection in a German boutique in the red-light district of Hanover

The jockstrap, which originated as utilitarian sports equipment, was appropriated by gay men starting in the 1950s, especially among fetish subcultures.

== History ==
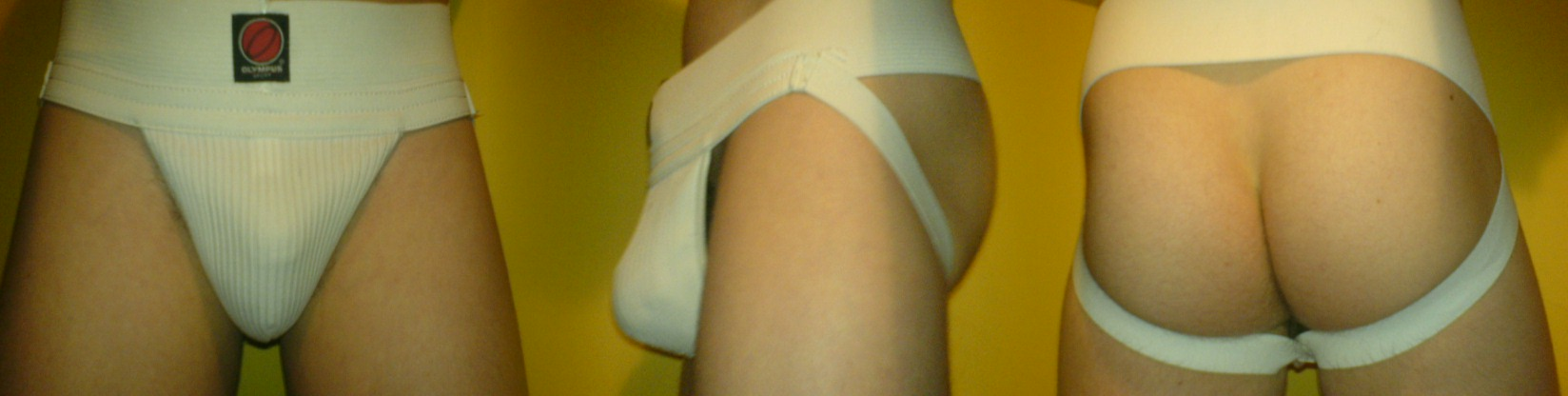
Frontal, side and rear views of a man wearing a jockstrap

A jockstrap, (Note: Also known as a jock (male), jill (female), strap, cup, groin guard, pelvic protector (female), supporter, or athletic supporter.) colloquially called a jock, is an undergarment for protecting the scrotum and penis during contact sports, exercising, or other vigorous physical activity.

A jockstrap consists of a waistband (usually elastic) with a support pouch for the genitalia and two elastic straps affixed to the base of the pouch and to the left and right sides of the waistband at the hip. The pouch, in some varieties, may be fitted with a pocket to hold an abdominal guard (impact resistant cup, box) to protect the testicles and the penis from injury.

The jillstrap (a.k.a. a "jill") is the female equivalent of the jockstrap, designed to protect the vulva from getting struck.

=== Entry into gay male culture (1950s–1960s) ===
Some gay men began adopting the jockstrap as erotic attire in the 1950s, coinciding with a broader shift towards hypermasculine aesthetics in queer fashion. Post-World War II leather and biker subcultures, influenced by gay ex-servicemen, embraced BDSM and icons of traditional masculinity (motorcycles, bomber jackets, construction workers). Underground homoerotic media accelerated its fetishisation. The 1950s magazine Physique Pictorial often featured muscular men in white jockstraps and artist Tom of Finland's illustrations also featured and eroticised the garment.

=== Rise in gay nightlife and fetish subcultures (1970s–1980s) ===
By the 1970s, while jockstraps were not routinely used by athletes, the garment was routinely worn in gay nightlife and fetish scenes, particularly in leather and BDSM communities. It was liked as the garment's design accentuated the crotch while exposing the buttocks, making it desirable for tops and bottoms. Jockstrap nights became common at venues worldwide. The garment's use in gay pornography, especially changing room and gym-themed scenes, further entrenched it as a fetish object. At this time, it became associated with an explicitly queer version of the existing jock archetype, as documented in Hal Fischer's 1977 photo series Gay Semiotics, which documented jocks in San Francisco's Castro District, alongside other explicitly masculine gay stereotypes.

During the AIDS crisis of the 1980s, jockstraps and leather remained visible symbols of hedonism and community resilience (e.g., sidewalk gatherings outside New York's The Saint nightclub).

=== Contemporary significance (2020s) ===
The garment became popular among gay men and the wider LGBTQ community in the 2020s. Major designers – including, Calvin Klein, JW Anderson, Gucci, and Rick Owens, alongside other large brands like Adidas, Diesel, and 2(X)IST – and other mainstream brands have featured jockstraps on runways and in Pride collections, including rainbow and pride-themed versions.

== As a fetish ==
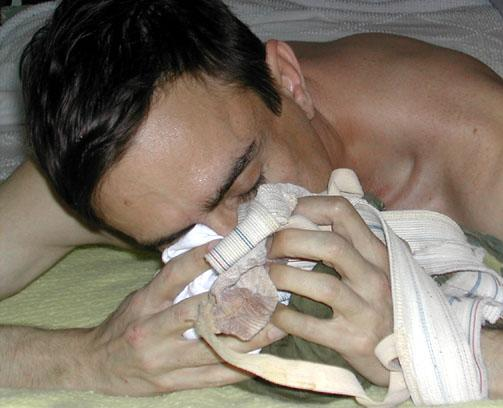
A man sniffing a jockstrap

Jockstrap fetishism is the term applied to the sexual arousal from handling, wearing, watching another put on, or sniffing a jockstrap. To quote on jockstrap sniffing, "jock[strap] sniffing specifically refers to the practice of inhaling odors from unlaundered jockstraps for the purpose of sexual stimulation. Practitioners, (usually male) are known as 'jock sniffers' and acquire unlaundered jockstraps either by swapping such garments with like-minded individuals or by swiping them from locker rooms, lockers or unattended gym bags".
