= Swim briefs =

Any briefs-style male swimsuit

A swim brief or racing brief is any briefs-style male swimsuit such as those worn in competitive swimming, diving and water polo. The popularity of the Australian Speedo brand racing brief has led to the use of its name in many countries around the world to refer to any racing brief, regardless of the maker. Occasionally, the speedo genericized trademark is applied to square cut swimsuits, but in general the generic term is used in reference to swimming briefs. Swim briefs are also referred to as competition briefs, swimming trunks, bathers, togs, racer bathers, posing briefs, racing briefs, and colloquially in Australia, New Zealand, and the United Kingdom as budgie smugglers.

Like underwear briefs, swim briefs feature a triangular shaped front and a solid back providing form-fitting coverage. They typically are worn below the true waist. They are generally secured by thin banding at the upper thighs, and a drawstring around the waist and/or an elastic waistband. Swim briefs are often made of a nylon and spandex (Lycra) composite, while some longer-lasting suits are made from polyester and still others from other materials. Most swim briefs have a beige or white front lining made of a similar fabric.

== Use and popularity ==
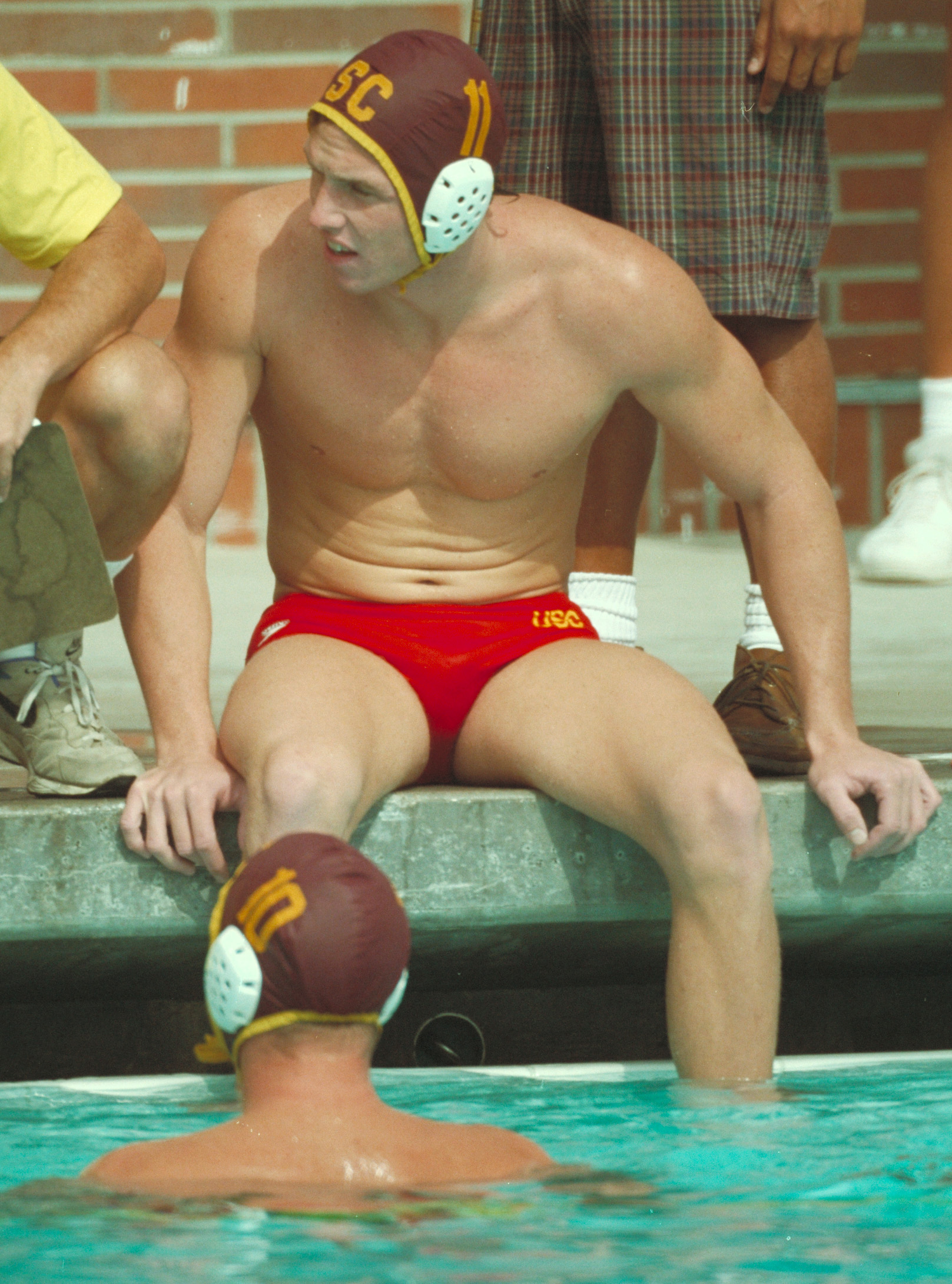
Water polo player wearing swim briefs.

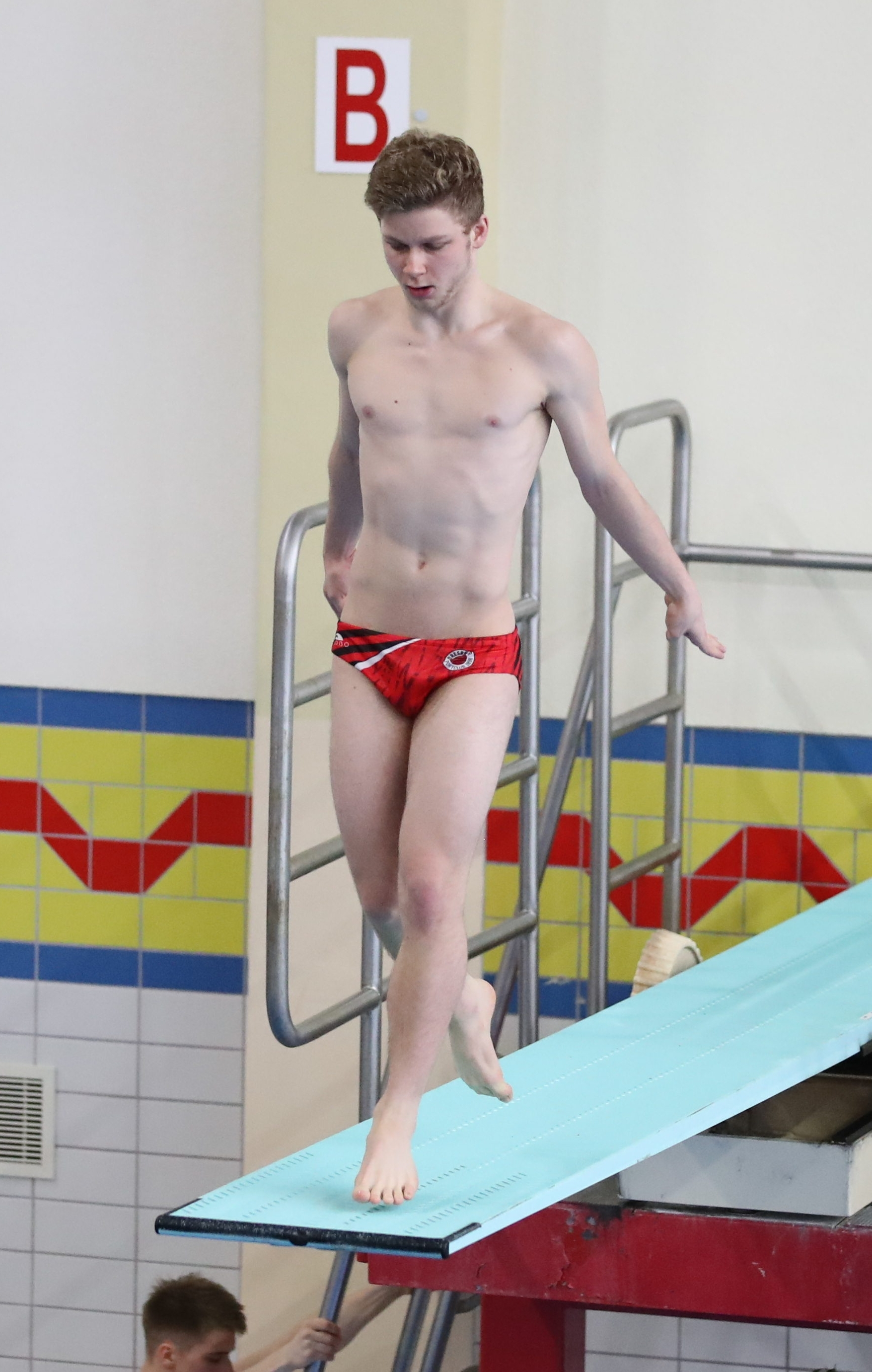
Swim briefs are the standard for competitive male divers.

The swim brief was introduced by Speedo in 1956 when Murray Rose wore it at the Summer Olympics in Melbourne and won three gold medals.

Swim briefs are worn by professional and recreational athletes in many water sports. They are the standard for competitive diving and water polo. They are preferred in competitive swimming for the reduction of the water's drag on the swimmer, although jammers and bodyskins are sometimes worn instead of the swim brief. Participants in sports that require a wetsuit such as waterskiing, scuba diving, surfing, and wakeboarding often wear swim briefs as an undergarment to the wetsuit.

While swim briefs are used worldwide by athletes for water sports, the popularity of swim briefs as casual beachwear and swim wear varies throughout the world. In Continental Europe and South America, briefs are relatively common among male casual swimmers and beach goers. In the United States and the United Kingdom, the roomier and less revealing trunks or board shorts are the suits preferred for recreation, although swim briefs are still seen to some extent. In some swimming pools in France, men are only permitted to wear form-fitting suits and not shorts, purportedly for reasons relating to hygiene. Reasons that swim briefs are chosen for recreation include style, ease of movement in the water, sunshine exposure, quick drying time, and the ability to be worn under pants or shorts. Former Australian prime minister Tony Abbott was a fitness fanatic noted for wearing speedos or "budgie smugglers".

Swim briefs are sometimes worn under board shorts for modesty purposes, and they are often used as an athletic supporter under shorts during sporting activities.

The swim brief saw increased popularity in 2017-25, with several brands introducing them in their collections.

== Styles ==
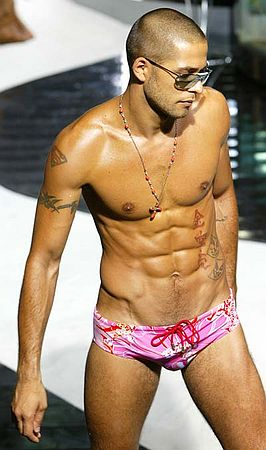
Male model wearing swim briefs, 2004.

Briefs worn for competitive and recreational swimming are manufactured in standard sizes and in waist measurements. They are available in a wide variety of solid colors and patterned designs.

=== Racing suits ===
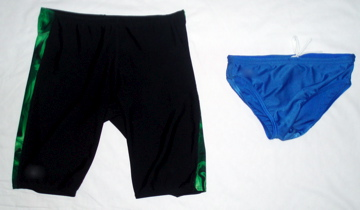
Comparison of jammer and swim brief types of swim suits.

The most common racing suit styles are 1.5 inch to 3 inch paneled briefs (as measured by the height and length of the suit's side panel). The racing suit's main function is to reduce the drag of an athlete in water, thus improving his time. For this reason racing suits are made of materials that hug the body, minimize friction and minimize water retention. Spandex (Lycra) suits generally produce less drag, but are also more vulnerable to prolonged exposure to chlorine than nylon. Therefore, nylon suits are preferred for training and practice, where the increased durability is required for the long periods of usage and the extra resistance brings a training benefit. Lycra suits (and composite hi-tech swimwear fabrics) are preferred for actual racing. In water polo and in diving, suits may have panels greater than 3 inches.

Water polo players generally wear racing suits. This is to minimize the fabric available to grabbing and pulling by opponents - actions that are illegal yet often happen underwater - while not compromising the strength of the fabric. High-level players wear specialized suits, usually of a very tight fit and made of thicker, tougher and more slippery fabric, intended to thwart pulling and grabbing during rough play; they often wear two suits, one over the other.

=== Triathlon swimming briefs ===
A special variety of briefs and trunks made for the triathlon features the racing suit's design for the swimming portion of the race but also incorporates light padding in the crotch of the garment for the bicycle portion of the race. This is a lighter version of the chamois in cycling shorts, to allow running in to be performed more efficiently and the shorts to dry faster after the swim.

== Manufacturers ==
In addition to the style's generic trademark term’s namesake company Speedo, competitive briefs-style swimwear are produced by companies including Adidas, Zoggs, Tyr, Dolfin, Arena, Kiefer, Nike, Inc. and aussieBum. Many of these companies have expanded their merchandise to reflect recent trends in water sports. These include the growing popularity of the jammer style and the development of full body suits for competitive swimming.

On the fashion end, several designer companies including Nautica, Olaf Benz, Calvin Klein and aussieBum have begun lines of brief style suits in the United States. Most designer brands of male swimwear in Europe, Asia and Australia produce lines of much briefer style suits, including the increasingly popular Brazilian square cut trunks (known as sunga(s) in Portuguese).
