= Kimberly Metz =

- Born: San Luis Obispo, California, US
- Website: kimberlymetz.com

Kimberly Metz is an American film director, fashion, beauty, celebrity and advertising photographer based in Los Angeles, syndicated by Corbis Outline and Corbis Beauty.

After a decade as a fashion model and a Screen Actors Guild actress, appearing in a Pringles commercial, a Sprite commercial, working in places such as Milan, Paris, New York City, London, and various other countries, Metz returned to her creative roots and passion behind the lens.

By combining her industry knowledge and experience from modeling and love for photography, Metz started her photography career in 1998. Metz found recognition when she photographed Arnold Schwarzenegger for the cover of Cowboys and Indians and Oscar winner Jamie Foxx and Jada Pinkett Smith for the cover of Upscale Magazine in 2004.

== Photography ==
Metz's photography has been featured in the New York Post,Forbes, Essence, Hamptons, Viva Magazine, LA Yoga, The Chew, People, L.A. Confidential Magazine, Modern Luxury Angeleno, Nail Pro Magazine, Pure Dope, Ripetv as well as junior and miss designers, advertising and stills for BET America DVD and book covers. She has won two Maggie awards for her 2001 cover of Weider Publications and her 2004 cover and celebrity feature of Instinct (magazine). Kimberly shot a 2016 Brawny campaign for International Women's Day. Kimberly also donated her services to Flashes of Hope.

She has shot numerous celebrities, musicians, and athletes, including Alexandra Daddario, Ajiona Alexus, Alaina Huffman, Alex Greenwald, Allie Grant, Amy Smart, Anthony Anderson, Amaury Nolasco, Antonio Sabàto Jr., Beverly Peele, Bill Maher, Bryan Callen, Bryan Cranston, Brooke Burns, Bryan Batt, Carlos Bernard, Catya Sassoon, Cheryl Hines, Celine Dion, Coby Bell, Corrinna Everson, Cedric The Entertainer, Christopher McDonald, Chrissy Teigen, Claudia Jordan, D.L. Hughley, Damien Escobar, Denise Richards, Diezel Braxton, DJ Quik, Elisabeth Röhm, Eric Winter, Elisha Cuthbert, Esai Morales, Esthero, Giorgio A. Tsoukalos, James Hyde, Jason Boesel, J-Roc, Julie Benz, Juliette Lewis, John Legend, Jason Everly, John Savage (actor), Josh Holloway, Julianne Hough, Jamie Chung, Kendra Wilkinson, Kendrick Lamar, Kenya Kinski-Jones, Kim Basinger, Kim Glass, Kim Kardashian, Laz Alonso, Lisa Dergan, Lisa Rinna, Marcus Allen, Mark Benecke, Marisa Ramirez, Marisa Miller, Matt Lanter, Michael Rubin, Mia Maestro, Meta Golding, Moon Bloodgood, Malin Åkerman, Marcus Allen, Monet Mazur, Mena Suvari, Nikki Ziering, Niki Taylor, Oliver Hudson, Paul Ben-Victor, Pooch Hall, Regina King, Renee Felice Smith, Rick Fox, Rob Minkoff, Robert Carradine. Robert Horry, Susan Sarandon, Wolfgang Puck, Willie Nelson, Rosario Dawson, Roselyn Sanchez, Sami Sheen, Sara Underwood, Sean McPherson, Sean Kanan, Seth Binzer, Shaggy, Shannon Elizabeth, Sierra McClain, Sisely Treasure, Skylar Stecker, Stacy Keibler, Stephen Glickman, Swin Cash, Tourie Escobar, Traci Bingham, Tyson Beckford, Tyler Lepley, Tom Green, Victor Webster, Victoria Pratt, Victoria Silvestadt, Warren G, Willie Nelson, Wolfgang Puck, Z Berg and Zulay Henao.

She has also appeared on camera for Bravo as a judge and photographer for Manhunt, as well as a photo expert on TLC's Faking It. She has also appeared on Bravo's Denise Richards & Her Wild Things, Episodes "Only Pans" and "The Family that Photoshoots Together..."

== Film ==
In 2012, Metz directed for the American Red Cross PSA campaign commercial for disaster relief featuring Elisabeth Röhm

In 2013, Metz directed a music video for "We Found Love" by recording artist Vaja

In 2015, Metz directed nine tutorial videos for Physician's Formula. Four of which are currently available on the Physician's Formula website.

In 2015, Metz directed and shot the commercial for Moroccan Heritage with Iman Oubou.

In 2016, Metz directed and shot the Last Chance for Animals PSA commercial featuring Kenya Kinski-Jones.

In 2017, Metz directed and shot the Last Chance for Animals PSA commercial featuring Mena Suvari.

In 2020, Metz photographed the Bet America commercial campaign featuring Bryan Callen and all talent for the Kentucky Derby.

In 2021, Metz directed and shot the Last Chance for Animals PSA commercial featuring Kim Basinger.

== Articles ==
- Fifth Avenue Article on Kimberly Metz
- Viva Magazine: About The Photographer
- Kimberly Metz Photo Shoot Video
