= Paul Vandervort =

American businessman and real estate broker

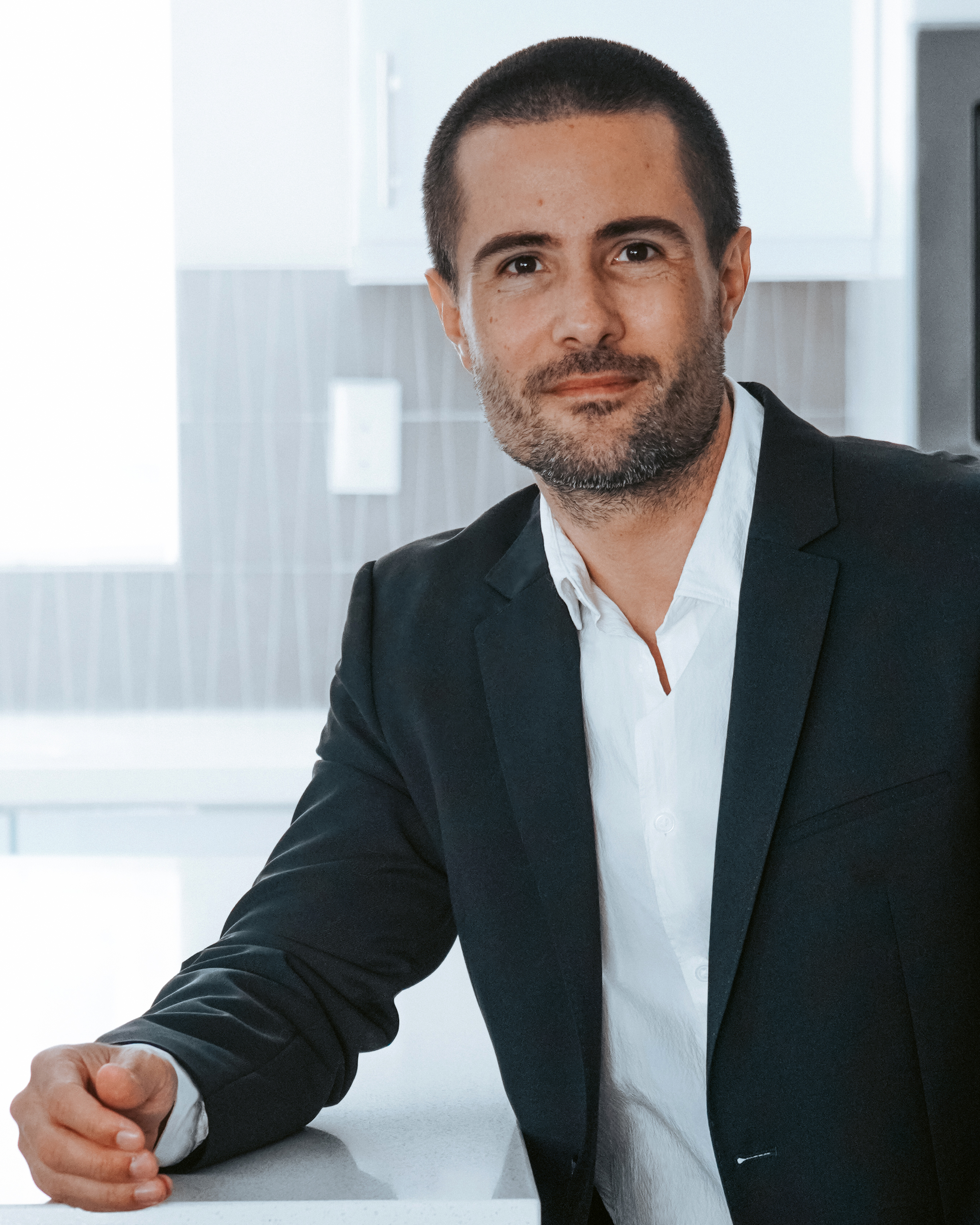
- Vandervort in 2023
- Born: Aspen, Colorado
- Education: San Diego State University
- Occupations: businessman; real estate broker
- Years active: 2008–present
- Website: https://paulvandervort.com

Paul Jeffrey Vandervort is an American businessman and real estate broker based in Colorado. Earlier in his career, he worked as an actor, film producer, and model.

Vandervort got his start in a modeling campaign for Abercrombie & Fitch in 2008 at age 22. One month after working with Abercrombie, Vandervort was cast as a series regular on the fourth season of the reality television series "The Janice Dickinson Modeling Agency". Vandervort was later cast in a recurring role on Disney XD's television pilot, "Billion Dollar Freshman".

Vandervort wrote, executive produced and starred in the independent drama film, "Limelight". Taylor & Dodge handled worldwide sales, and the film was distributed by Freestyle Digital Media.

== Filmography ==
=== Films ===
Year	Film	Role	Other notes
2011	Billion Dollar Freshman	3.0	TV movie
2015	Hollywood Miles	Miles, Writer, Executive Producer	Short Film
2017	Limelight	Miles Chance, Writer, Executive Producer	Feature Film

=== Television ===
Year		Role	Other notes
2008	The Janice Dickinson Modeling Agency	Himself	Series 4
2009	Hannah Montana	Young Man	Cheat It
2009	iCarly	Klaus	Awards
2010	Melissa & Joey	Lennox's Study Partner / Ralph Lauren Model	Episode: “Dancing with the Stars Toledo”
2011	Parenthood	Tyler	New Plan
2011	PrankStars	Paul	
2014	Happyland	Caveman Head	TV movie
2014	Youthful Daze	Brad Gilmore	Online TV Series
