= Rufskin =

American men's clothing manufacturer

Rufskin is an American men's athletic, underwear, swimwear, sportswear and denim manufacturer headquartered in San Diego, California. Founded in 2002, the company is owned and operated by designer Hubert Pouches and president Douglas Coats.

== Company history ==
Rufskin was created after Douglas Coats and Hubert Pouches relocated from France to Southern California. Originally hand-made and distributed from a residential location, the company has since expanded to several brick-and-mortar stores and maintains a heavy online presence. The company is known for its marketing towards the gay community, with provocative advertising and promotion within gay clubs and events. Pouches cites a desire to create clothing that is "sexy, futuristic, masculine and athletic". He also notes his inspiration came from working as a designer in France, also operating a modeling agency, where he met Douglas Coats. While well-received in the United States, Rufskin does especially well overseas, ultimately resulting in the opening of a European flagship store in Amsterdam for a period of time. To date, the brand is sold in various boutiques and retail stores around the world, including San Diego, Palm Springs, New York City, Miami and Amsterdam.

The company designs, manufactures and distributes exclusively from California. While Rufskin focuses mainly on marketing its ready-to-wear apparel, the brand offers specialty leather goods such as jackets and custom-fitted pants.

== Advertising and collaborations ==
Since the earlier days of its inception, Rufskin has enlisted various industry photographers to create what are often provocative and risqué advertising campaigns. Photographer Rick Day has used Rufskin brand apparel and models in several projects, including digital and print media.

Rufskin has had several successful international advertising campaigns, including a 2011 Golden Iris Reader’s Choice Award for Campaign of the Year on location in Brazil. In 2012 the company worked with Rick Day on the beaches of South Africa.

In February, 2015 the company collaborated with Tom of Finland to create an exclusive 15-piece collection. The collection was sold online via their website, and at company stores. Both Hubert Pouches and Douglas Coats have been fans of Touko Laaksonen, and have cited him as a source of inspiration since before starting the company.
