= Manhunt (2004 TV series) =

2004 reality television series

- Genre: Reality television
- Presented by: Carmen Electra
- Judges: Marisa Miller; Bruce Hulse
- Country of origin: United States
- Original language: English
- No. of seasons: 1
- No. of episodes: 8

Production
- Executive producers: Stuart Krasnow; Denise Cramsey; Robert Horowitz; Amy Introcaso-Davis; Ian Levy
- Production locations: Los Angeles, California
- Running time: 60 minutes
- Production company: TWI

Original release
- Network: Bravo
- Release: October 12 – November 30, 2004

Manhunt: The Search For America's Most Gorgeous Male Model is an American reality television series broadcast by Bravo. The series premiered on October 11, 2004, while its eighth and final episode aired on November 30, 2004. Filmed in Los Angeles, California, the series depicted a competition among thirty men were required to travel around the United States and compete against one another in a variety of challenges. American model Carmen Electra hosted the series.

Guest judges include former male supermodel Bruce Hulse, model Marisa Miller, former model and photographer director Kimberly Metz, and Stuff magazine editor Courtney Kendall. Jon Jonsson won the competition, receiving a four-year contract with IMG Models worth $100,000.

== Season summary ==
Season	Premiere date	Winner	Runner-up	Other contestants in order of elimination	Number of contestants	International destination(s)
1	12 October 2004	Jon Jonsson	Rob Williams	Brian Bernie & Casey Ward & Micah LaCerte & Sean Russell, Blake Peyrot & Brett Dupue & Casey Weeks & John Stallings, Ron Brown & Seth Whalen, Jason Pruitt & Kevin Osborn & Matt Lanter & Paulo Rodriguez, Tate Arnett, Hunter Daniel, Maurice Townsell, Kevin Peake (quit)	20	San Juan

== Models ==
(ages stated are at start of contest)

Semi-finalists

Contestant	Age	Height	Hometown	Occupation	Outcome	Place
Dominic	26	1.93 m (6 ft 4 in)	Nashville, Tennessee	Cook	Episode 1	30-21
Fox	24	1.88 m (6 ft 2 in)	Orange County, California	Youth Pastor/Student	Episode 1	30-21
Jacob	19	1.80 m (5 ft 11 in)	Newborn, Georgia	Construction	Episode 1	30-21
Jeff	24	1.93 m (6 ft 4 in)	Redwood Falls, Minnesota	Day Trader	Episode 1	30-21
J.R.	21	1.85 m (6 ft 1 in)	Norman, Oklahoma	Student	Episode 1	30-21
Rocky	24	1.90 m (6 ft 3 in)	Decatur, Georgia	Marine Corps Sergeant/Server	Episode 1	30-21
Stefan	20	1.75 m (5 ft 9 in)	Buffalo, New York	Abercrombie Brand Rep	Episode 1	30-21
Steven	22	1.85 m (6 ft 1 in)	Joplin, Missouri	Band Manager/Waiter	Episode 1	30-21
Yaacov	25	1.85 m (6 ft 1 in)	Israel	Aspiring Model/Actor	Episode 1	30-21
Zach	19	1.83 m (6 ft 0 in)	Omaha, Nebraska	Hardware Store/Construction	Episode 1	30-21

Finalists

Contestant	Age	Height	Hometown	Occupation	Outcome	Place
Brian Bernie	25	1.85 m (6 ft 1 in)	Moorpark, California	Waiter	Episode 1	20-17
Casey Ward	20	1.83 m (6 ft 0 in)	Prescott, Arkansas	Personal Trainer	Episode 1	20-17
Micah LaCerte	25	1.83 m (6 ft 0 in)	Olathe, Kansas	Personal Trainer	Episode 1	20-17
Sean Russell	21	1.93 m (6 ft 4 in)	Madison, Connecticut	Marketing Student	Episode 1	20-17
Blake Peyrot	21	1.88 m (6 ft 2 in)	Los Angeles, California	Student	Episode 2	16-13
Brett Dupue	31	1.98 m (6 ft 6 in)	Las Vegas, Nevada	Real Estate Agent	Episode 2	16-13
Casey Weeks	26	1.83 m (6 ft 0 in)	Huffman, Texas	Steakhouse Host	Episode 2	16-13
John Stallings	24	1.83 m (6 ft 0 in)	Sandy, Utah	Retail Sales Clerk	Episode 2	16-13
Ron Brown	19	1.83 m (6 ft 0 in)	Florence, South Carolina	Retail Sales	Episode 3	12-11
Seth Whalen	23	1.93 m (6 ft 4 in)	Baltimore, Maryland	Aspiring Clothing Designer	Episode 3	12-11
Jason Pruitt	24	1.88 m (6 ft 2 in)	Vidalia, Georgia	Marketing Research	Episode 4	10-7
Kevin Osborn	25	1.90 m (6 ft 3 in)	Long Island, New York	Construction Worker	Episode 4	10-7
Matt Lanter	21	1.78 m (5 ft 10 in)	Atlanta, Georgia	Atlanta Braves Batboy	Episode 4	10-7
Paulo Rodriguez	23	1.85 m (6 ft 1 in)	Cape Town, South Africa	Student	Episode 4	10-7
Tate Arnett	21	1.88 m (6 ft 2 in)	Dodge City, Kansas	Fitness Consultant	Episode 5	6
Hunter Daniel	20	1.80 m (5 ft 11 in)	De Queen, Arkansas	Student/Lifeguard/Retail Sales	Episode 6	5
Maurice Townsell	23	1.85 m (6 ft 1 in)	Reno, Nevada	Air Filtration Systems Salesman	Episode 7	4
Kevin Peake	22	1.85 m (6 ft 1 in)	Fort Lauderdale, Florida	Club Promoter/Embedded Model	Episode 8	3 (quit)
Rob Williams	25	1.88 m (6 ft 2 in)	Arlington, Texas	Law Student	Episode 8	2
Jon Jonsson †	22	1.80 m (5 ft 11 in)	Carmel, California	Astrophysics Student	Episode 8	1

=== John Stallings ===
John Stallings is a gay American model. He has appeared on The Janice Dickinson Modeling Agency, having been selected as a model by Janice Dickinson for her eponymous agency.

=== Paulo Rodriguez ===
Paulo Rodriguez was eliminated because the judges saw him more as an acting character than a high fashion model.

=== Kevin Peake ===
Actor and model. As 2003 Mr. USA, Kevin Peake represented the US in the International Male Modeling Competition, which he placed 2nd runner-up over all. At 18 yrs old, he was one of the finalists on ABC's Are You Hot?.

=== Matt Lanter ===
Now an actor and model. Later, he appeared in the American television series 90210 as Liam Court, originally a recurring character but now a lead role. Starred in the TV series Star Wars: The Clone Wars, along with its film of the same name. Also starring in NBC's Timeless.

=== Jon Jonsson ===
Jon Jonsson
- Born: Jon Grimkell Helgasson; 1982; Reykjavík, Iceland
- Died: 2025 (aged 42–43); Monterey County, California, U.S.
- Modeling information
- Height: 6 ft 0 in (1.83 m)
- Hair color: Brown
- Eye color: Brown

Jon Jonsson (born Jon Grimkell Helgasson) was born in Reykjavík, Iceland to an Icelandic father and a Thai mother.

After winning Manhunt in 2004, he modeled and signed with IMG Models and several major agencies in Singapore, Australia, New York, Los Angeles, and San Francisco.

He also modeled in campaigns for companies such as Abercrombie and Fitch, Ed Hardy, OCBC Bank,... landed covers for several major magazines such as V, Men's Health, Urban, Female, Catalogue Singapore,... and headlined various runways shows and hosted the Singapore Fashion Festival for MediaCorp. Most notably, Jonsson was a temporary video jockey for MTV Southeast Asia

Known for shying away from the media and his disillusionment of the fashion industry, he quit modeling completely in 2007 to focus on his education. However, he returned in 2011, signing with Click Boston, Look Model Agency in San Francisco, and resigning with Nous Models in Los Angeles. In 2012, he was mainly represented by Ave Management in Singapore, but decided to focus on his legal career, having passed the California bar exam.

In 2009, he received his Bachelor of Science degree in Astrophysics from the University of California, Santa Cruz. He wrote a thesis relating to the magnetic field signatures of Jupiter's moons.

In May 2012, Jonsson graduated from the University of New Hampshire School of Law (formerly Franklin Pierce Law Center),

He is registered to practice before the United States Patent and Trademark Office, and in 2013, became a registered patent attorney in the State of California.

On Sunday, February 23, 2025, Jon Jonsson died while hiking with friends in Carmel Valley, California. Jon felt unwell and sat to take a rest on the hike, passed out, and then died. Specific cause is unknown at this time.

== Photo shoot guide ==
- Episode 1 photo shoot: Topless in jeans; Group shot with Carmen Electra (casting)
- Episode 2 photo shoot: Late night rooftop with Marisa Miller
- Episode 3 photo shoot: Gender bender
- Episode 4 photo shoot: Advertising shoot with random products
- Episode 5 photo shoots: Secret paparazzi; B&W emotion in suit
- Episode 6 photo shoots: Swimsuit calendar; Runway on the pool
- Episode 7 photo shoot: Rainforest editorial
- Episode 8 photo shoots: B&W Nude
