= J. P. Calderon =

American volleyball player and reality show contestant

J.P. Calderon
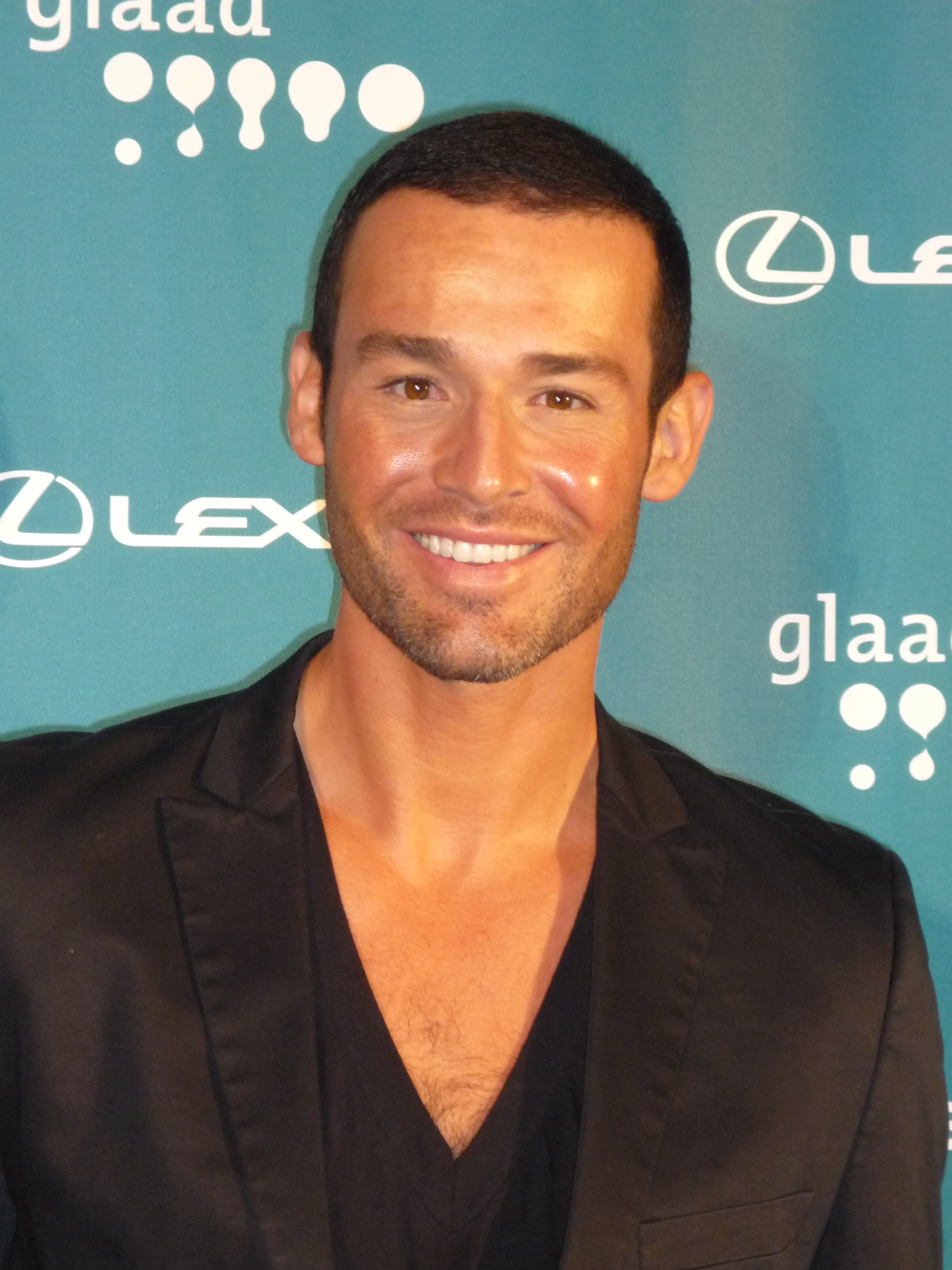
- Born: John Paul Calderon; September 5, 1975 (age 50); Santa Monica, California, U.S.
- Education: Long Beach State
- Occupations: Volleyball player, model, reality television star
- Television: Survivor: Cook Islands; The Janice Dickinson Modeling Agency

John Paul Calderon (born September 5, 1975) is an American professional volleyball player, model and reality show personality. In 2006, he was a contestant on Survivor: Cook Islands, the 13th season of the CBS reality show. The following year, he became a regular member of The Janice Dickinson Modeling Agency. As part of his experience he was the February 2007 cover guy of Instinct magazine. He did so again in 2008, becoming the first man to be featured on their cover twice.

== Early life and education ==
Calderon was born in Santa Monica, California, the second son after his older brother Peter, to Edwin and Xinia. He grew up in Marina del Rey, California. Of Costa Rican heritage, he was raised in a Roman Catholic household. His mother died from breast cancer when he was nine. From a young age he wanted to be a model but got negative feedback from his dad, so he stuck to sports instead. His dad was won over when Calderon's modeling career took off.

Calderon attended St. Bernard’s Catholic High School, then Santa Monica City College for two years, and then California State University, Long Beach, where he played for the school's nationally ranked men's volleyball team. His family is into soccer so it was a point of stress from his father that he played volleyball instead, until he started winning volleyball awards. He graduated with a degree in speech communication in 2000. Calderon is of Costa Rican descent.

== Career ==
=== Volleyball ===
Calderon was offered a pro volleyball opportunity in 1998 in Barcelona, Spain but decided instead to finish his degree. He was offered the assistant coach position for the Long Beach State University women's volleyball team. He did so for five years, first as a volunteer for three years, then paid for two more years. He credits the time as learning the differences between men's and women's volleyball styles. At the same time he got a local club coaching position at Mizuno Long Beach Volleyball Club, and began coaching for Junior Olympics. He began his professional volleyball career in 2004 and became a nationally ranked Association of Volleyball Professionals player.

=== Survivor ===
Calderon's dad died in 2005, right before the Survivor opportunity, and it let him feel free to express his emotions as he never had a good relationship with his dad. He was approached by a CBS recruiting coordinator to be on the show when he was having breakfast with some friends. On Survivor: Cook Islands (2006), Calderon started off as one of five members of the Hispanic "Aitutaki" tribe. After the tribes were merged on day eight he became a member of the "Rarotonga" tribe. In retrospect he faults himself for viewing the series more as a sports competition than for the social aspects that build alliances. Calderon was the fourth cast member voted off in a 7-2 split. He credits the show with opening his eyes than he controlled his choices and had options.

=== The Janice Dickinson Modeling Agency ===
In 2007, Calderon began his modeling career when he joined the cast of The Janice Dickinson Modeling Agency. Stating that he had for a long time wished to model, Calderon came to an open casting call held in the first episode of Season 2. He said the process, and Dickinson, were fun, but they did have the models drop their modesty, and be naked, and in their underwear constantly. He was called back in episode 2 and eventually signed to the agency.

The third episode saw Calderon being approached to appear on the cover of Instinct magazine, a publication that requires that its male cover models be openly gay. Although he had been "in and around gay people and nightlife", he had not publicly talked about his sexuality to the media. He knew he was gay since high school, and even worked as a bartender in a gay bar. There were rumors that he was gay but he avoided addressing them, as well as invitations to interview with gay publications like Instinct. Calderon came out as gay on his appearance in the February 2007 issue, their swimsuit edition, which included the cover, a photo spread, feature story and interview. He said he wasn't pressured into the decision and was supported by Dickinson. "All of my fears, everything that I was scared of... it was the complete the opposite," he said. "It's been great. All of my friends, the volleyball world, absolutely everybody has been supportive. No one has shut me out." Dickinson, in particular, has been very supportive, and told him that her role models for being tough, driven and ambitious, were all gay men. He credits his coming out as helping him reprioritize his life. In 2009, he was also a cover model for the popular French gay magazine Têtu.

It was announced during the 4th season finale of The Janice Dickinson Modeling Agency that Calderon will head the male division of the agency when it moves to New York City. Calderon is also signed to KULT Model Agency in Germany.

=== Other ===
In 2011, Calderon was cast as part of Logo TV's A-List; Los Angeles, as part of their A-List franchise, but no cast or scheduling information has been forthcoming

In 2012, Calderon modeled for the NOH8 Campaign created by celebrity photographer Adam Bouska, to oppose California Proposition 8 which attempted to change California's constitution to forbid same-sex marriage.

== Personal life ==
In October 2013, he became engaged to his longtime boyfriend, Julz Heaney, in Hawaii. Heaney is a real estate agent. They have been together since 2007.
