= Brian Kehoe =

American model

Brian Patrick Kehoe
- Born: January 23, 1982 (age 44)
- Other names: Kehoe
- Modeling information
- Height: 6 ft 1 in (1.85 m)
- Hair color: Brown
- Eye color: Green
- Agency: LA Models
- Website: www.Instagram.com/KehoeFromReno

Brian Patrick Kehoe (/ˈkiːhoʊ/; born January 23, 1982) is an American male fashion model and former reality television show participant on Oxygen's program The Janice Dickinson Modeling Agency.

== Personal life ==
Kehoe was born in Reno, Nevada in 1982 and graduated from Bishop Manogue Catholic High School. In 2001 he attended University of Nevada, Reno, and became a member of the Sigma Nu fraternity the following year. He re-enrolled in 2012 and graduated with a major in Broadcast Journalism and minor in Political Science. In 2018 he obtained his real estate salesperson license and became an agent with Berkshire Hathaway in Reno.

== Modeling career ==
Kehoe began his modeling career at International Models & Talent Association (IMTA) in January 2001, winning Runner Up for Male Model of the Year and placing 1st in events such as Swimwear and Ready For My Closeup.

Kehoe signed with Click Models, and LA Models Runway Division from his exposure at IMTA. Peter Kluge, talent manager, also signed Kehoe as one of his new actors. One of his first castings was for the Abercrombie & Fitch Spring/Summer 2001 catalog, which he was on hold for, but did not book. Kehoe returned home to Reno in January 2002.

From 2006 - 2011, Kehoe modeled for various brands including 2(x)ist, Adidas, Joe's Jeans, Jenn’s Jawns, and Ed Hardy.

In 2008, at a party, Kehoe met an associate of talent manager Felicia Sager, who brought him in for a meeting which led to auditions for television shows in the likes of The Bold and the Beautiful, Days of our Lives, Beverly Hills 90210, Hannah Montana, (then pilot) Vampire Diaries, and Ashton Kutcher's The Beautiful Life. This exposure was followed by a Carrabba's Lifetime Achievement Award in which he is allowed to enjoy free meals at select Carrabba's locations.

In 2008, Kehoe could also be seen in a humorous commercial for gossip website TMZ's TV show in which a number of people thank TMZ for teaching them unethical behavior such as not following the rules and how to take a good mugshot. Kehoe can be seen saying, "Thanks to TMZ, I learned that dating a celebrity is the only way I'll be a celebrity!"

In 2009, Kehoe was shot by Jenn Hoffman for Male Model Scene while being represented by Pinkerton Models in Los Angeles.

== Janice Dickinson Modeling Agency ==
In 2006, Kehoe traveled to Los Angeles to attend an open call audition for The Janice Dickinson Modeling Agency during the show's taping of its second season. He was selected to join the agency and within a few weeks moved to the Los Angeles area.

In season two, Kehoe was selected by Jason Scarlatti to participate a photo shoot for 2(x)ist's new Varsity Line which was shot on Catalina Island.

In season three, Kehoe's roommate Grant Whitney Harvey joined the agency. Kehoe was hired to do photo shoots for Go Softwear and Dragonfly by Edward Dada. During the public demonstration by the agency models in support of the People for the Ethical Treatment of Animals (PETA), Kehoe was one of the models that removed his clothing as part of PETA's "I'd rather go naked than wear fur" campaign. At season's end, Kehoe was chosen by Janice Dickinson as one of her top models that would travel with her to Miami to test the viability of opening a Miami branch of the agency. In Miami, Kehoe joined the other models in doing a runway show for Ed Hardy intimates and men's underwear.

In season 4, Kehoe lived in the model house only for a short time before being kicked out by Janice after telling fellow model Crystal Truehart to "Go do some blow.” Kehoe later received word that Janice may show some leniency towards him if he shows up to a TINTe photo shoot where other JDMA models would be working. Within minutes of Kehoe's arrival, Janice makes it very clear he is not wanted and kicks him off the set where he is forced to hitch hike back to Hollywood. Kehoe can be seen in a large portion of the reunion special (finale episode), which is dedicated to his ambiguous sexuality. Much to the disappointment of many, Kehoe's lie detector results proved the truth of his answers.

In 2008, Kehoe sued Janice Dickinson for $2000 for allegedly calling him an alcoholic and causing him to lose work. The lawsuit was heard on the television show Christina's Court where Judge Perez ruled in Dickinson's favor.

In 2010, The Janice Dickinson Fan Club released the track Metro Sexy (Kehoe's Song), inspired by Kehoe.

== See also ==
- List of male underwear models
