= AussieBum =

Australian men's swimwear and underwear manufacturer

aussieBum
- Type: Private
- Industry: Fashion
- Founded: 2001
- Founder: Sean Ashby
- Headquarters: Sydney, Australia
- Area served: Worldwide
- Products: Men's swimwear, underwear, and clothing
- Website: www.aussiebum.com

aussieBum is an Australian men's swimwear and underwear manufacturer.

== History ==
Founded in 2001 by Sean Ashby, he had the initial idea the year previous, whilst seeking nylon swimwear which had fallen out of favour for lycra.

The name was chosen because Ashby thought of himself as a "beach bum" and just wanted to pay the rent and spend afternoons on the beach.

His friend Marcia Abboud recounts she was the "un-official" co-founder of aussieBum; however, she did not contribute financially. She assisted in the production of early lines of aussieBum's swimwear, pressing the brand's logo onto the garments with a heat press.

The company itself was funded by Ashby using $20,000 of savings intended for a house.

Ashby and Abboud initially attempted to sell the swimwear to every surf and swimwear shop around Sydney, and were rejected being told that lycra was the preferred material for swimwear.

Ashby also sold the underwear from the back of his car.

Ashby took all the photos for the initial photoshoots for the brand.

In 2003 aussieBum's underwear featured in Kylie Minogue's music video for "Slow"; this was a piece of unintentional marketing on the brand's part. Minogue's stylist William Baker Smith had contacted the brand requesting samples of the entire collection, only saying that it was "a bit top secret".

In 2003, with increasing sales, Guyon Holland joined Ashby at aussieBum to streamline the back-end business operations.

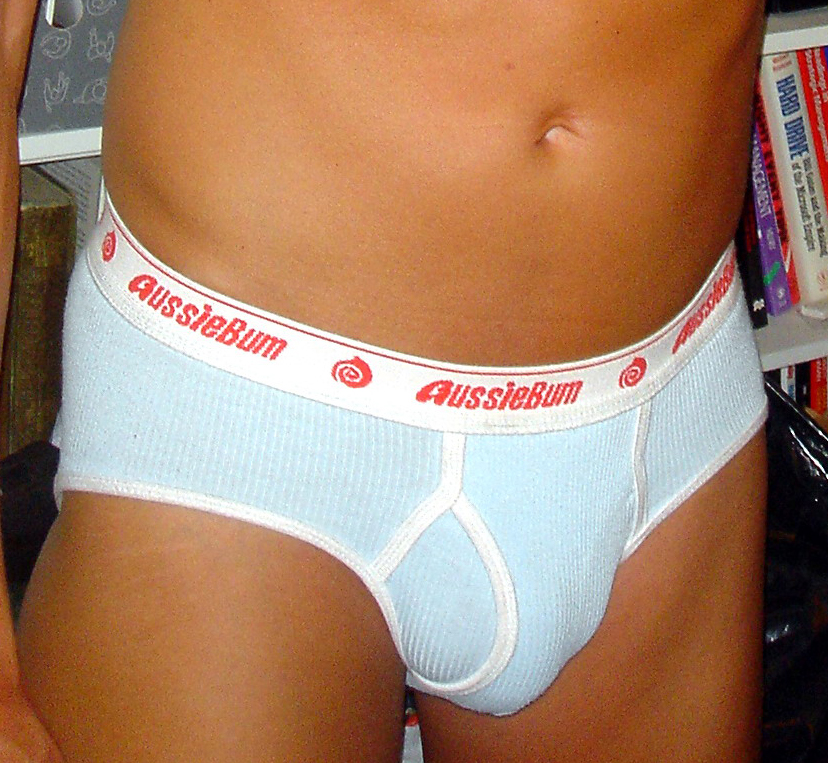
aussieBum men's briefs, Ice Blue in colour

In 2004 more than 80 percent of aussieBum's revenue was derived from export sales to; Europe, the United States, Canada and Asia.

By 2005 exports accounted form 90 percent of all revenue. aussieBum was assisted by the Australian government through financial relief via Tradex relating to imported goods intended for re-export.

In 2005 Ashby received the Premier's NSW Export Awards.

In 2007 aussieBum had three different manufacturers in Sydney, Australia who manufacture exclusively for aussieBum.

In 2009 Federal Member for Grayndler, Anthony Albanese congratulated aussieBum on winning the Small to Medium Manufacturer Award category in the 47th Annual Australian Export Awards.

In October 2023 aussieBum sought to expand into India after Ashby was approached by an investor with the backing of an Indian family in Singapore who wanted to buy the company, telling him Indians found the brand appealing. It plans to capture 3-5% of the underwear market in India.

In 2015 aussieBum's top five markets (not in order) were North America, United Kingdom, Germany, France and Australia.

In 2019 South Korea was aussieBum's seventh largest market.

== Production ==
Early in aussieBum's production Sean Ashby utilised three dye sublimation printers.

aussieBum has a 'design to shelves' process, enabling it to design and release a product within seven days.

aussieBum intended to have manufacturing in India set up by the end of 2025.

== Products ==
In 2005 aussieBum's product range were stocked by Selfridges in the United Kingdom, Ka Da We Department in Germany and Brown Thomas in Ireland.

In January 2006 aussieBum launched "Essence", underwear treated with acerola a plant high in vitamin C, which would impart the vitamin to the wearer, lasting 15-20 washes. It earned aussieBum a place on the front page of the New York Post.

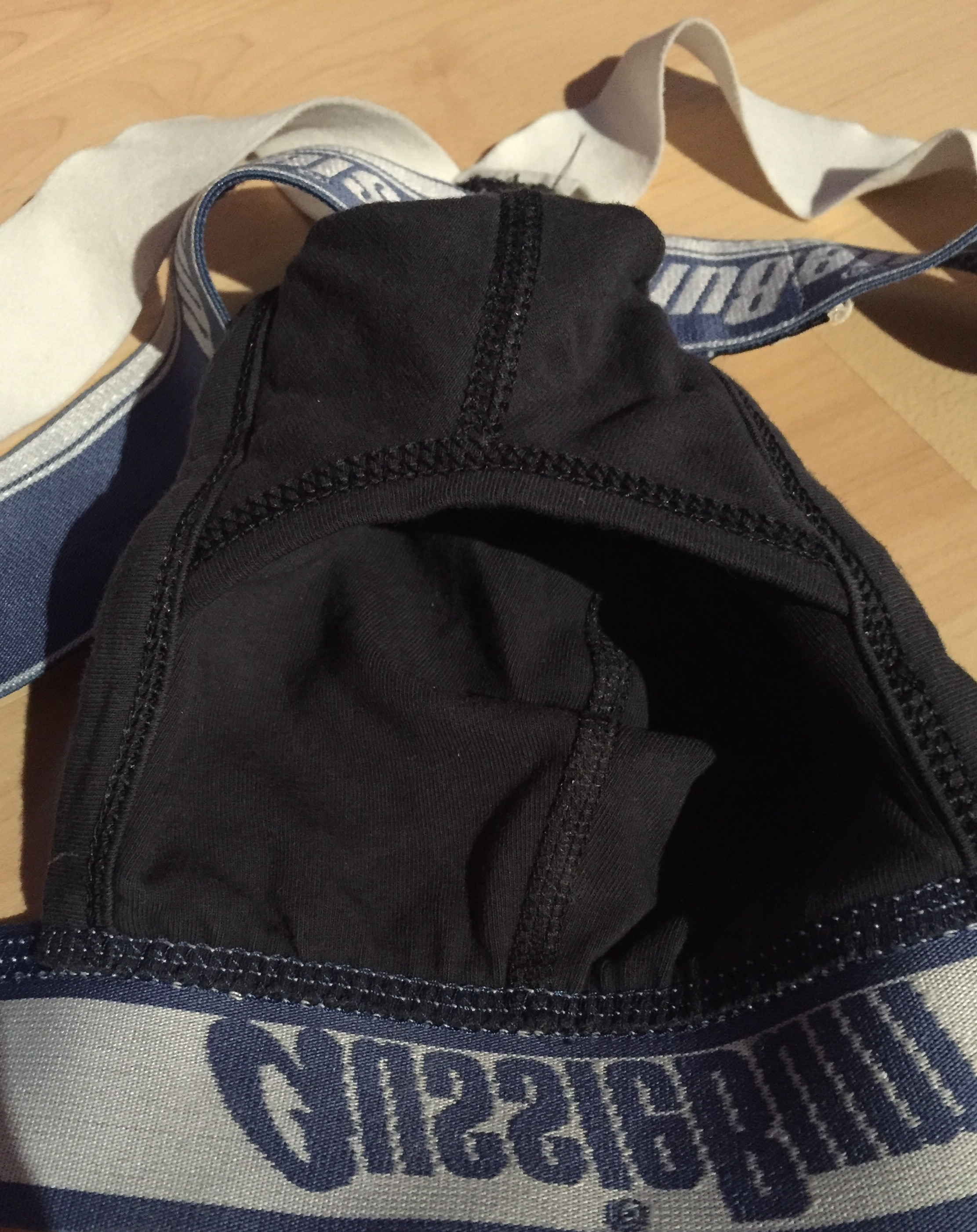
aussieBum men's jockstrap, with Wonderjock Technology

In November 2006, the Wonderjock was launched in the aussieBum underwear lines. Wonderjocks have been designed to "lift" and "enhance" a man's "package", through the use of a fabric cup used to protrude everything out instead of just down.

In March 2010 aussieBum announced a banana fibre for use in their underwear. The fabric was 27 percent banana fibre, 64 percent cotton and 9 percent lycra.

== Sales and marketing ==
The company promotes with its company website. The company has no shop front.

Its marketing slogan is "if you doubt yourself, wear something else".

aussieBum refer to their customers as "The Tribe".

aussieBum's version of Shearing the Rams

aussieBum has in the past produced limited edition productions, limited in some cases to 150 per style in the case of their "Luxe" collection in 2016.

In 2007 25% to 30% of aussieBum's sales were to the United States.

In 2014 aussieBum were principal partners for the Gay Rugby Cup.

In 2020 sales were $21.2 million.

Photography for aussieBum is done at Ashby's home at a designer warehouse space, the downstairs being a photographic studio and the upstairs his home.

=== Criticism ===
In 2007 aussieBum's advertising for their "Flaunt" underwear was the subject of an Advertising Standards Bureau complaint, which was dismissed in September 2007.

In 2016 aussieBum released underwear with a print of a caricature of an Indigenous male standing on one leg with a dot-painted boomerang in front of a large red rock, which some interpreted as Uluṟu. When made aware of the associations, Ashby said he "realised he had been naïve" and said all examples of the underwear would be destroyed.

== See also ==
- List of swimwear brands
- Speedo (suit style)
