= 2(X)IST =

American fashion company

- Type: Private
- Industry: Fashion
- Founded: 1991; 35 years ago
- Founder: Gregory Sovell
- Headquarters: Dayton, New Jersey, United States
- Products: Men's underwear, activewear, swimwear, clothing, and fashion accessory
- Parent: The Moret Group
- Website: 2xist.com

2(X)IST (pronounced "to exist") is an American luxury fashion label that makes men's underwear, swimwear, activewear, loungewear, socks, and watches. It also launched a women's line featuring activewear, sleepwear and intimates. The company was founded in 1991 and is headquartered in Dayton, New Jersey.

== History ==
2(X)IST was founded in 1991 by Gregory Sovell and was acquired by the Moret Group in 1995. In 2005, Sovell left the company and founded C-IN2, another brand of men's underwear.

On March 11, 2026, the brand announced via email newsletter that it would be ending its Loyalty Program on March 13, 2026. This would be the last email marketing message sent. Between then and November 2026, their e-commerce website was shut down, reading, “We're taking a brief break. Please visit us on Amazon to shop your favorite 2(X)IST products.”
