= The Janice Dickinson Modeling Agency =

Reality television series, 2006–2008

- Created by: Janice Dickinson
- Directed by: Darren Ewing
- Starring: Janice Dickinson; Nathan Fields; Savannah Dickinson; Gabrial Geismar; Duke Snyder; Peter Hamm (1-3)
- Country of origin: United States
- No. of seasons: 4
- No. of episodes: 41

Production
- Executive producers: Kevin Williams; Stuart Krasnow
- Running time: 30 minutes (season 1); 60 minutes (seasons 2-4)
- Production companies: Krasnow Productions; FremantleMedia North America

Original release
- Network: Oxygen Network
- Release: June 6, 2006 – December 2, 2008

The Janice Dickinson Modeling Agency, or TJDMA, is a reality television series that debuted on Oxygen on June 6, 2006. The show completed four seasons, through which it followed the self-proclaimed world's first supermodel Janice Dickinson as she took on the role of a modeling agent to her own eponymous agency, also called The Janice Dickinson Modeling Agency, which opened for business in November 2005.

== Summary ==
=== Season 1 ===
Janice Dickinson decides to open her own self-titled modeling agency. She works in collaboration with business partner Peter Hamm to handle the affairs of the agency, yet creative differences set them apart.

The show begins when Janice holds an open call in her original location, responded by approximately 500 model-wannabes. After hiring 5 amateur models, the location of the agency moves to a bigger area. Janice finds a partner in Peter Hamm, who causes conflicts between her, himself and the subsequent models that get hired. As time passes, the agency suffers financial loss as Janice reveals she has been borrowing money from Peter to fund the agency, and in order to survive, several models are to be retrenched. At the end of the season, the agency launches their billboard at Sunset Boulevard, and zed cards are administered to the new roster of models.

=== Season 2 ===
The increasing popularity of the agency leads Janice to becoming busier. She returns from vacation only to find some models upset at how Peter has been handling their careers.

When the original roster is affected after some models leave, Janice decides to open another open call, and the overwhelming response has Janice confident that her new roster will be fresher than before, causing jealousy between the existing models and the new models. The season features the infamous AussieBum incident, where Janice is fired after speaking ill of her AussieBum client off-camera, and the inspirational coming out of ex-Survivor contestant J. P. Calderon through a gay magazine.

=== Season 3 ===
Janice sets history in the modeling world by opening her very own Latin Division as well as her third open casting. Promising models TJ Wilk and Stina Jeffers leave the agency, the former being unsatisfied with Peter Hamm's work ethics, and the latter having signed to Ford Models. Another open call introduces several new models. Janice hints opening an agency branch at Miami. Her business relationship with Peter is finally put to an end when complications put her credibility with clients at jeopardy.

=== Season 4 ===
The 4th season premiered on August 26, 2008. This season sees Janice close down her property at Hollywood & Highland and move her agency to a villa titled the Model House, where she will live with a select number of her existing and new models. Halfway through the season, a request for plus-size model is made by a client which Janice eventually chose not to refuse, though she becomes abrasive and intolerant over the three new plus-size models her son Nathan introduces to the agency.

During the fourth season finale, Janice announced her plans to move to New York City to truly and officially pursue her dreams of making a high fashion boutique agency. After firing the plus-size models as well as a popular existing model, Traci Moslenko, the future of the LA agency is currently dim, along with the fact of whether the existing models will stay or leave. Janice chose Crystal Truheart to model in the upcoming New York agency and took in JP as the head of the agency's male division.

After four seasons, the show was not renewed, implying the failure of the New York division and the closure of the agency brand.

== Models as of the end of Season 1 ==
=== The "Management Board" roster ===
Name	Age^{1}	Sex	Hometown
Sarah Eisele	18	Female	Hesperia, California
Jenny "Fargo" Gilbertson	23	Female	Fargo, North Dakota
Adrian Gonzalez	19	Male	Cutler, California
Kristina "Stina" Jeffers	23	Female	Altadena, California
Christopher Jones	25	Male	Falls Church, Virginia
Billy Marquart	19	Male	Quincy, Illinois
Tony K. Perez	25	Male	Honolulu, Hawaii
Brittany Picozzi ^{2}	16	Female	Las Vegas, Nevada
Paul Ramirez	26	Male	Denver, Colorado
Pierce Ross	19	Female	Las Vegas, Nevada
John Stallings	26	Male	Sandy, Utah
Maurice Townsell	25	Male	Reno, Nevada
Crystal Truehart	18	Female	Southampton, Massachusetts
Christopher Vanek	20	Male	Van Nuys, California
Terry "TJ" Wilk	27	Male	Cleveland, Ohio
Natalie Winsell	20	Female	Newport Beach, California

- ^{1} Ages are according to The Janice Dickinson Modeling Agency's model profiles and are presumed to be correct at the time of filming.
- ^{2} Not mentioned in season finale, but was shown on the Sunset Boulevard electronic billboard.

=== New Faces ===
Name	Age^{1}	Sex	Hometown
T.J. Bates	25	Male	Wanship, Utah
Marcus Foy	23	Male	New Orleans, Louisiana
Ben Gallenson	21	Male	Santa Rosa, California
Nyabel Lual	24	Female	Nasir, South Sudan
Bryan McMullin	20	Male	Placerville, California
Timika Robinson	22	Female	Riverside, California
Lauren Wasser	18	Female	San Diego, California
Marlon Yates	18	Male	Los Angeles, California

- ^{1} Ages are according to The Janice Dickinson Modeling Agency's model profiles and are presumed to be correct at the time of filming.

== Season 2 models ==
=== Existing ===
Name	Height^{1}	Weight	Sex	Residence/Hometown
Jenny "Fargo" Gilbertson	5 ft 8 in (173 cm)	108 lb (49 kg)	Female	Fargo, North Dakota
Adrian Gonzales	6 ft 2 in (188 cm)	157 lb (71 kg)	Male	Los Angeles, California
Kristina "Stina" Jeffers^{2}	5 ft 10 in (178 cm)	120 lb (54 kg)	Female	Altadena, California
Christopher H. Jones	6 ft 2 in (188 cm)	160 lb (73 kg)	Male	Falls Church, Virginia
William "Billy" Marquart	6 ft 0 in (183 cm)	170 lb (77 kg)	Male	Los Angeles, California
Paul Ramirez^{3}	N/A	N/A	Male	Denver, Colorado
Pierce Ross	5 ft 10 in (178 cm)	110 lb (50 kg)	Female	Santa Monica, California
John Stallings	6 ft 0 in (183 cm)	155 lb (70 kg)	Male	West Hollywood, California
Maurice Townsell	6 ft 1 1/2 in (187 cm)	185 lb (84 kg)	Male	Sparks, Nevada
Crystal Truehart	5 ft 9 1/2 in (177 cm)	122 lb (55 kg)	Female	Northampton, Massachusetts
Christopher Vanek	6 ft 2 in (188 cm)	160 lb (73 kg)	Male	Van Nuys, California
Terry "TJ" Wilk^{4}	6 ft 0 in (183 cm)	160 lb (73 kg)	Male	Beverly Hills, California
Natalie Winsell	5 ft 7 in (170 cm)	110 lb (50 kg)	Female	Newport Beach, California
Marcus Foy^{5}	6 ft 2 in (188 cm)	165 lb (75 kg)	Male	Los Angeles, California
Nyabel Lual	5 ft 9 in (175 cm)	128 lb (58 kg)	Female	Los Angeles, California
Timika Robinson^{6}	5 ft 11 in (180 cm)	124 lb (56 kg)	Female	Los Angeles, California
Marlon Yates Jr.	6 ft 2 in (188 cm)	180 lb (82 kg)	Male	Los Angeles, California

- ^{1} Height, weight, residence/hometown are according to The Janice Dickinson Modeling Agency's Oxygen website model profiles and are presumed to be correct at the time of filming.
- ^{2} Leaves the agency in Season 3, Episode 2
- ^{3} Leaves the agency in Season 2, Episode 1
- ^{4} Leaves the agency in Season 3, Episode 1
- ^{5} Fired by Janice in Season 2, Episode 7
- ^{6} Leaves the agency in Season 2, Episode 3

=== New Faces ===
Name	Height ^{1}	Weight	Sex	Residence/Hometown
Desiree Bick	5 ft 9 in (175 cm)	?	Female	Pacific Palisades, California
Andrew Brett^{2}	6 ft 4 in (193 cm)	165 lb (75 kg)	Male	Los Angeles, California
J. P. Calderon	6 ft 2 in (188 cm)	200 lb (91 kg)	Male	Long Beach, California
Johan Cederstrand	6 ft 2 in (188 cm)	176 lb (80 kg)	Male	Marina del Rey, California
Jordan Condra	5 ft 10 in (178 cm)	105 lb (48 kg)	Female	Tucson, Arizona
Jonathon D. Cox	6 ft 0 in (183 cm)	150 lb (68 kg)	Male	Highland, Indiana
Lakiska Finger	5 ft 9 in (175 cm)	110 lb (50 kg)	Female	Memphis, Tennessee
Kate Heffernan	5 ft 11 in (180 cm)	125 lb (57 kg)	Female	Palm Desert, California
Brian Kehoe	6 ft 1 in (185 cm)	190 lb (86 kg)	Male	Reno, Nevada
Jordan Lee^{3}	5 ft 7 in (170 cm)	105 lb (48 kg)	Female	Santa Clarita, California
Traci Moslenko	5 ft 8 in (173 cm)	108 lb (49 kg)	Female	Yorba Linda, California
Robert Naughton	5 ft 10 in (178 cm)	160 lb (73 kg)	Male	Beverly Hills, California
Lisa Riddle	5 ft 8 in (173 cm)	113 lb (51 kg)	Female	Hesperia, California
Ligia Rodrigues	5 ft 10 1/2 in (179 cm)	114 lb (52 kg)	Female	Brockton, Massachusetts
Christopher Paul Strandburg	6 ft 0 in (183 cm)	175 lb (79 kg)	Male	Granite Bay, California

- ^{1} Height, Weight, Residence/Hometown are according to The Janice Dickinson Modeling Agency's Oxygen website model profiles and are presumed to be correct at the time of filming.
- ^{2} Cut in Season 1, rejoined in Season 2, Episode 2.
- ^{3} Fired by Janice in Season 2, Episode 5.

== Models as of Season 3 ==
Name	Height	Weight	Sex	Residence/Hometown
Shelby Stingley	5 ft 10 in (178 cm)	125 lb (57 kg)	Female	Los Angeles, California
Billy Marquart	6 ft 0 in (183 cm)	170 lb (77 kg)	Male	Los Angeles, California
Brian Bernie	6 ft 1 in (185 cm)	185 lb (84 kg)	Male	Moorpark, California
CC Fontana	5 ft 8 1/2 in (174 cm)	115 lb (52 kg)	Female	Long Island
Chris Jones	6 ft 2 in (188 cm)	160 lb (73 kg)	Male	Falls Church, Virginia
Christian Prelle	6 ft 2 in (188 cm)	195 lb (88 kg)	Male	
Crystal Truehart	5 ft 9 1/2 in (177 cm)	122 lb (55 kg)	Female	Northampton, Massachusetts
Danny Nuñez	6 ft 0 in (183 cm)	178 lb (81 kg)	Male	La Crescenta-Montrose, California
Daria Lukonina	5 ft 10 in (178 cm)	118 lb (54 kg)	Female	Nizhny Novgorod, Russia
Desiree Bick	5 ft 9 in (175 cm)		Female	Pacific Palisades, Los Angeles
Dominic Figlio	6 ft 1 in (185 cm)	190 lb (86 kg)	Male	Northridge, Los Angeles
Kate Heffernan	5 ft 11 in (180 cm)	125 lb (57 kg)	Female	Palm Desert, California
Dominique Sharpe	5 ft 7 1/2 in (171 cm)	100 lb (45 kg)	Female	Los Angeles, California
Grasie Mercedes	5 ft 8 in (173 cm)	120 lb (54 kg)	Female	New York, New York
Joe Monbleau	6 ft 0 in (183 cm)	170 lb (77 kg)	Male	Rota, Spain
Jordan Condra	5 ft 10 in (178 cm)	105 lb (48 kg)	Female	Tucson, Arizona
J. P. Calderon	6 ft 2 in (188 cm)	200 lb (91 kg)	Male	Long Beach, California
Brian Kehoe	6 ft 1 in (185 cm)	190 lb (86 kg)	Male	Reno, Nevada
Davon Smart	6 ft 2 in (188 cm)	220 lb (100 kg)	Male	San Francisco
Lakiska Finger	5 ft 9 in (175 cm)	110 lb (50 kg)	Female	Irving, Texas
Ligia Rodrigues	5 ft 10 in (178 cm)	114 lb (52 kg)	Female	Brockton, Massachusetts
Lisa Riddle	5 ft 8 in (173 cm)	113 lb (51 kg)	Female	Hesperia, California
Nadia Alexandria	5 ft 9 in (175 cm)	124 lb (56 kg)	Female	Moscow, Russia
Paul Anderson	6 ft 1 in (185 cm)	174 lb (79 kg)	Male	Orlando, Florida
Payton Brady	6 ft 2 in (188 cm)	185 lb (84 kg)	Male	Denver, North Carolina
Rodrigo de Carli	6 ft 2 1/2 in (189 cm)	175 lb (79 kg)	Male	Curitiba, Brazil
Shaun McCarron	5 ft 11 in (180 cm)		Male	New Orleans
Sorin Mihalache	6 ft 1 in (185 cm)	185 lb (84 kg)	Male	Romania

== Models as of Season 4 ==
Name	Height	Weight	Sex	Residence/Hometown
J.P. Calderon	6 ft 2 in (188 cm)	200 lb (91 kg)	Male	Long Beach, California
Crystal Truehart	5 ft 9 1/2 in (177 cm)	122 lb (55 kg)	Female	Northampton, Massachusetts
Xian Mikol	5 ft 10 in (178 cm)		Female	Los Angeles, California
Paul Vandervort	5 ft 10 in (178 cm)	150 lb (68 kg)	Male	Colorado Springs, Colorado
Chandler Maness	6 ft 3 in (191 cm)	185 lb (84 kg)	Male	Coevorden, Netherlands
Brian Kehoe	6 ft 1 in (185 cm)	190 lb (86 kg)	Male	Reno, Nevada
Maurice Townsell	6 ft 2 in (188 cm)		Male	Reno, Nevada
Braneka Basset	5 ft 10 in (178 cm)	110 lb (50 kg)	Female	Freeport, The Bahamas
Sorin Mihalache	6 ft 1 in (185 cm)	185 lb (84 kg)	Male	Romania
CC Fontana	5 ft 8 1/2 in (174 cm)	115 lb (52 kg)	Female	Long Island
Crystal 'Toi' Winston	5 ft 10 in (178 cm)		Female	San Diego
Gavyn Michaels	6 ft 1 in (185 cm)	182 lb (83 kg)	Male	Tampa, Florida
Danny Nuñez	6 ft 0 in (183 cm)	178 lb (81 kg)	Male	La Crescenta-Montrose, California
Dominic Figlio	6 ft 1 in (185 cm)	190 lb (86 kg)	Male	Northridge, Los Angeles
Dominique Sharpe	5 ft 8 in (173 cm)		Female	Los Angeles
Hazuki Kato	5 ft 10 in (178 cm)	105 lb (48 kg)	Female	Tokyo, Japan
Martin Ritchie	5 ft 11 in (180 cm)	170 lb (77 kg)	Male	Austin, Texas
Erika Wilhite	5 ft 11 in (180 cm)		Female	Los Angeles
Mia Fields	5 ft 8 in (173 cm)	113 lb (51 kg)	Female	Hesperia, California
Michael Anderson	6 ft 2 in (188 cm)		Male	Flint, Michigan
Nadia Alexandria	5 ft 9 in (175 cm)	124 lb (56 kg)	Female	Orange County, California
Christian Prelle	6 ft 3 in (191 cm)		Male	Orange County, California
Selina Inkrote	5 ft 11 in (180 cm)		Female	Lewisburg, Pennsylvania
Payton Brady	6 ft 2 in (188 cm)	185 lb (84 kg)	Male	Charlotte, North Carolina
Polina Tretiakova	5 ft 10 1/2 in (179 cm)		Female	Saint Petersburg, Russia
Traci Moslenko^{1}	5 ft 8 in (173 cm)		Female	Orange County, California

- ^{1} Fired by Janice in Season 4, Episode 9.
