= Sea bathing =

Bathing in the sea or in sea water

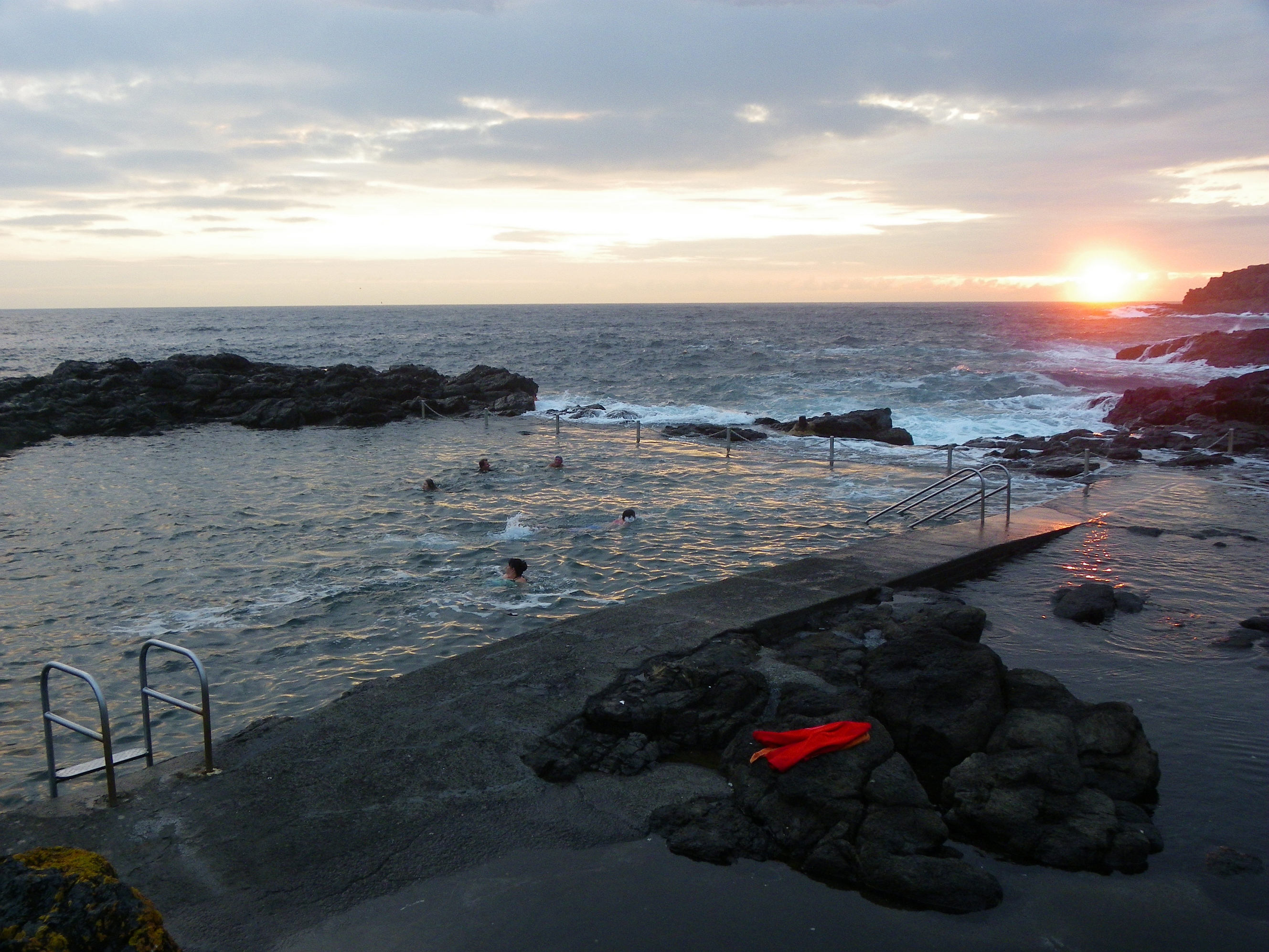
Kiama sea baths in New South Wales, Australia

Sea bathing is swimming in the sea or in sea water and a sea bath is a protective enclosure for sea bathing. Unlike bathing in a swimming pool, which is generally done for pleasure or exercise purposes, sea bathing was once thought to have curative or therapeutic value. It arose from the medieval practice of visiting spas for the beneficial effects of the waters. The practice of sea bathing dates back to the 17th century but became popular in the late 18th century. The development of the first swimsuits dates from the period as does the development of the bathing machine.

The practice of sea-bathing developed starting in the mid-1700s into the modern cultural phenomenon of beachgoing. In the 19th century, the introduction of railways led to the further development of seaside resorts and bathing boxes. The death of large numbers of people while swimming in the open sea led to the introduction of surf lifesaving in Australia and lifeguards throughout the world in the early 20th century. With the extension of scheduled air transport since the latter half of the 20th century, the development of seaside resort areas such as Ibiza in Spain, the Queensland Gold Coast in Australia and the Miami metropolitan area in the U.S. attracted millions of visitors annually.

== Benefits ==
The growth in popularity of sea bathing developed from the perceived health benefits of mineral springs, such as those at Spa in Belgium, Bath in England and Aachen in Germany. Sea water was similarly believed to have medicinal benefits. The medicinal benefits of the sun were also being recognised.

In 1753, Dr. Richard Russell published The Use of Sea Water which recommended the use of sea water for healing various diseases, and William Buchan wrote his 1769 book Domestic Medicine advocating the practice. Sea bathing and sea water were advocated with winter considered to be the best time to follow the practice. Buchan's book was published until 1846 and was translated into many languages.

Marine hospitals opened in parts of France and England. The first French marine hospital, Petit Berck, opened in 1861.

There has been a tremendous growth in sea bathing, especially in the 20th century. However, the trend was slightly reversed after melanoma was linked with excessive exposure to the sun.

Though no longer widely considered to actually cure disease, shades of the supposed curative properties of sea water can still be noted with the trend of bath products containing Dead Sea salt, which is claimed to provide some relief from certain skin diseases.

== History ==
=== 18th and 19th centuries ===
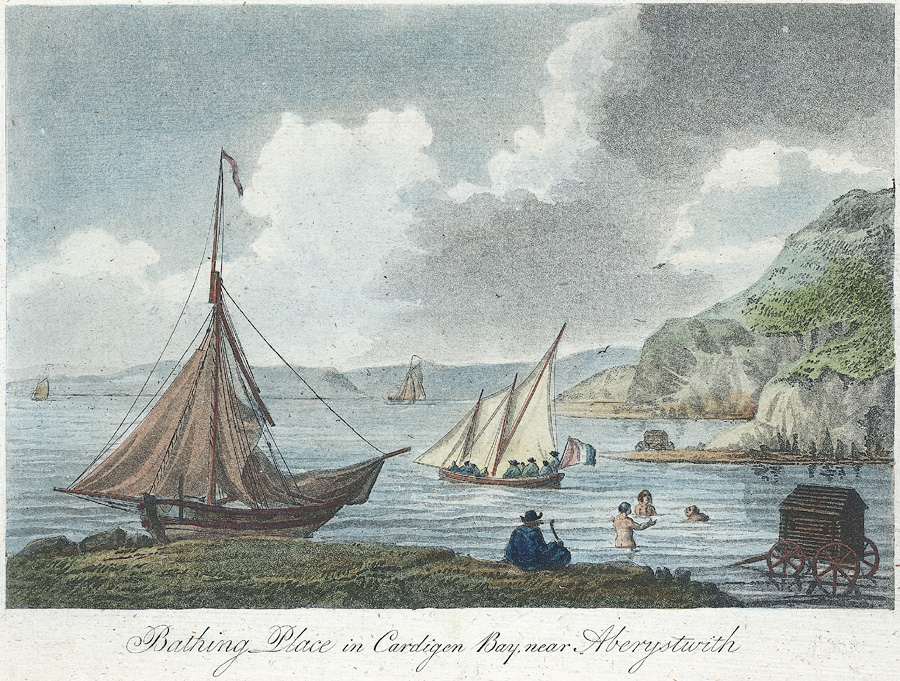
Sea bathing in mid Wales c.1800. Several bathing machines can be seen.

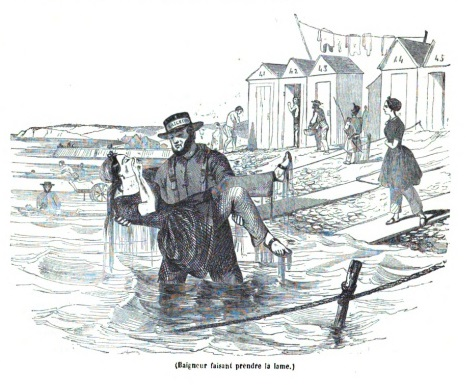
Sea bathing at Boulogne in the 1840s

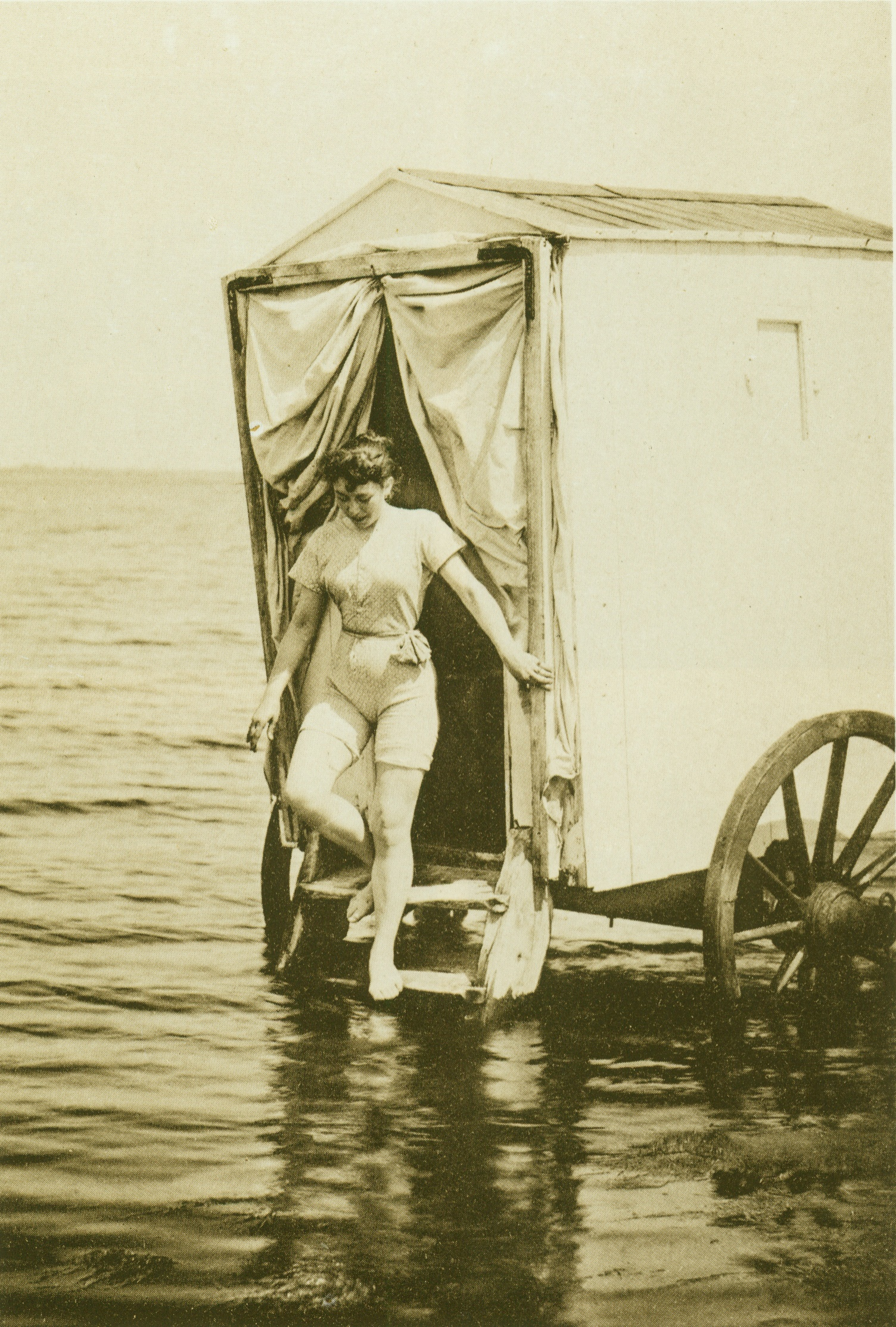
Bathing machine and woman's swimwear style of Germany, 1893

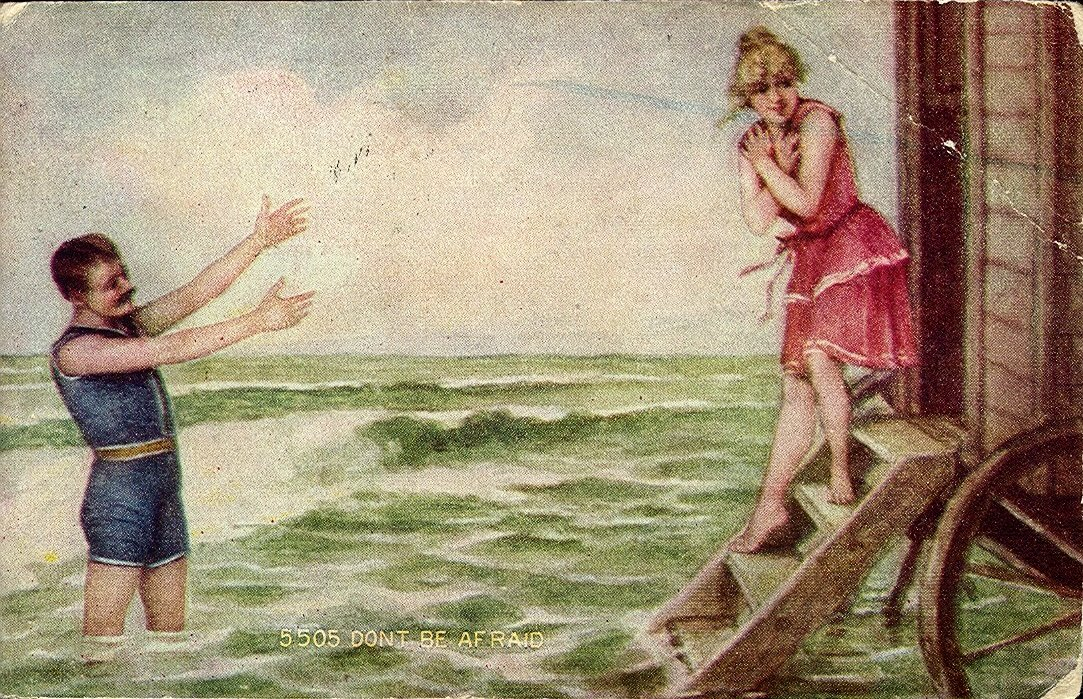
Man and woman in swimsuits, c. 1910; she is exiting a bathing machine.

With Buchan's recommendations, people suddenly flocked to the coasts, especially to Great Britain and France. The public and authorities were concerned with the morality of general sea bathing. Scarborough was the first resort to introduce bathing machines, with a John Setterington engraving showing machines in 1735. They were soon adopted in most of the aspiring English seaside resorts. Women would wear "bathing gowns" in the water while the men would wear long swimsuits. Some resorts such as Margate had modesty hoods or tilts which were canvas awnings attached to bathing machines. These could be let down to allow a woman to enter and leave the water in privacy. If desired, the woman could also be dipped in privacy under the shelter of the hood.

By the end of the 18th century, sea bathing became highly fashionable with George III visiting Weymouth for the first time with the bathing machines showing God Save the King. Fanny Burney recorded a humorous incident in her diaries.

"Nor is this all. Think but of the surprise of His Majesty when, the first time of his bathing, he had no sooner popped his royal head under water than a band of music, concealed in a neighbouring machine, struck up "God save great George our King".

During this period, resorts sprang up along the English coast, such as Weymouth, Bournemouth, Blackpool and Scarborough. In 1771, Tobias Smollett recorded the use of bathing machines in The Expedition of Humphry Clinker. Jane Austen regularly visited seaside resorts and in her uncompleted novel Sanditon stated "The Sea air and Sea Bathing together were nearly infallible, one or the other of them being a match for every Disorder..."

The invention of the railway, and the proliferation of rail travel in the mid-19th century made it possible for large numbers of people to visit coastal regions. The railways, seaside towns and resorts promoted the purported health benefits of sea water; and resort towns grew enormously. Resorts were set up throughout Europe in the late 18th century and early 19th century as far north as Scandinavia. In the United States, resorts such as Atlantic City became very popular while the French Riviera became popular not only amongst the French but with English visitors.

Dippers or guides were used with the bathing machines and they escorted visitors into the water.

=== 20th century ===
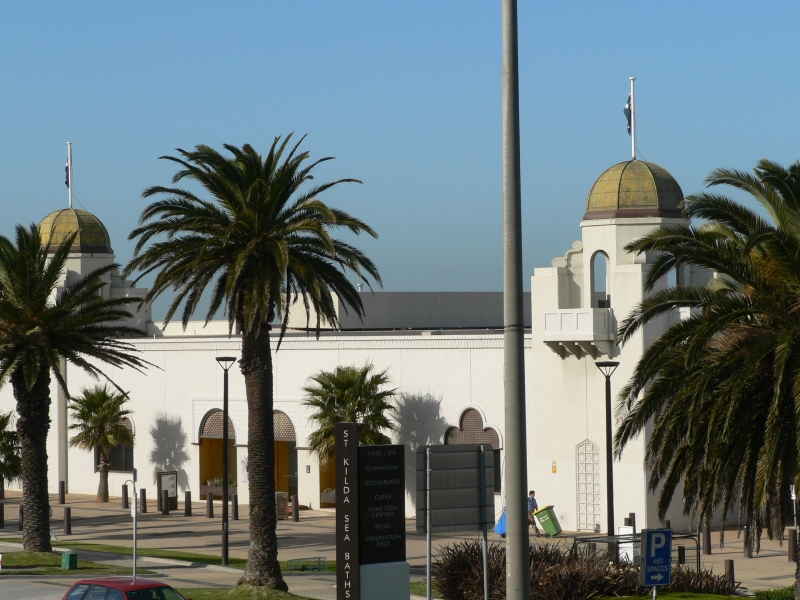
St Kilda Sea Baths established in the 1850s, rebuilt in the 1920s and recently restored

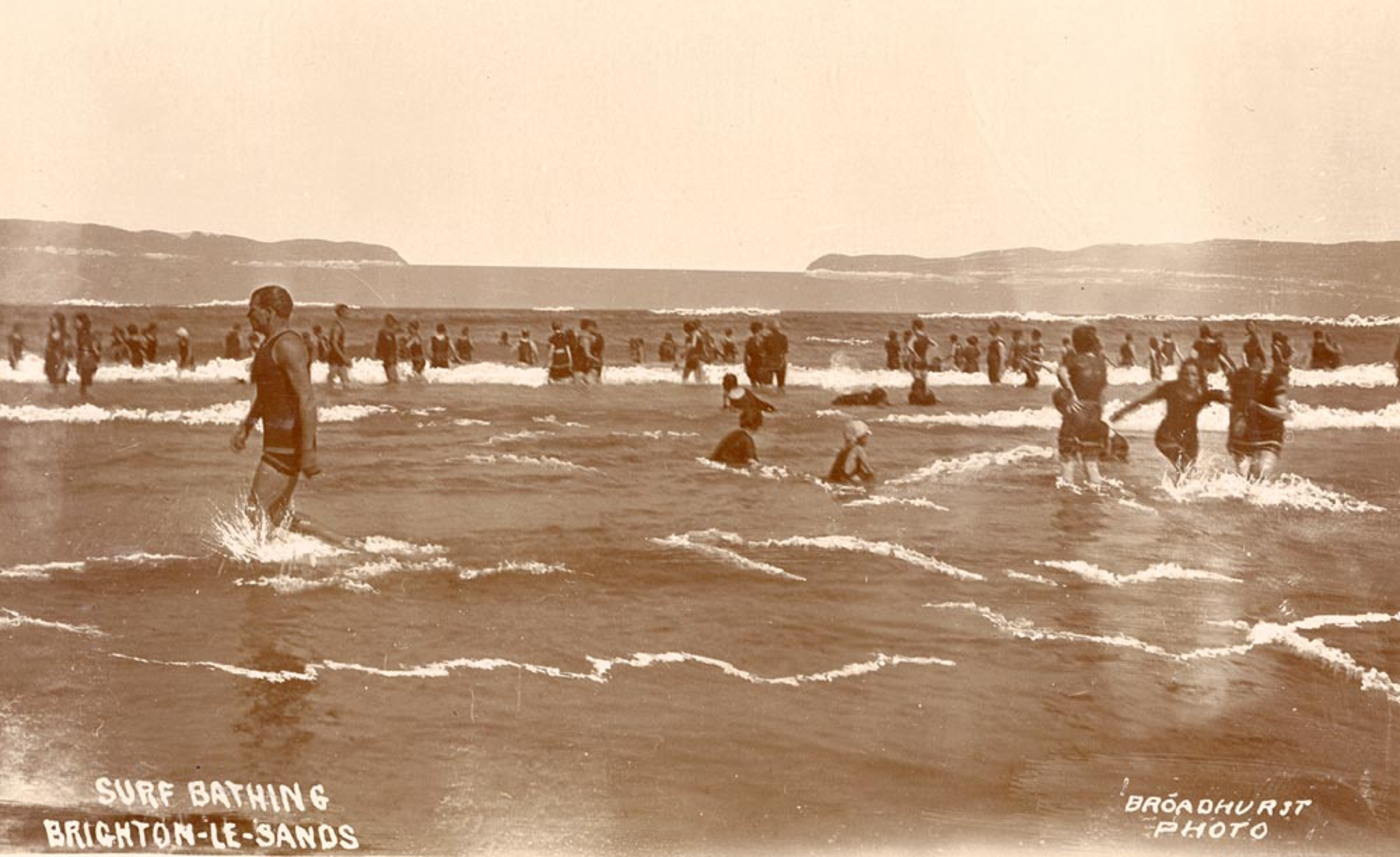
Surf Bathing at Brighton-Le-Sands Australia (early 20th century)

In 1903, Australian bathers were allowed to use public beaches in daylight hours. Then the prohibition to Sunday, Christmas and Easter bathing was revoked in the 1920s, and mixed bathing was permitted from the 1940s. Restrictions on swimsuits also eased over time, with the designation of some beaches as topless and others as nude.

As public bathing became more popular, more inexperienced swimmers going out into unfamiliar waters put themselves at risk. In the US, lifeguards were often paid employees of local governments employed when bathing was most popular. In Australia, the Surf Bathing Association of NSW formed in 1907 to coordinate voluntary surf lifesaving on beaches throughout Sydney. This organisation became the Surf Lifesaving Association of Australia in 1923. The Association proved its worth on February 6, 1938, on Bondi Beach when hundreds of bathers were saved when they were taken out to sea in a freak rip on what became known as Black Sunday. Lifesaving organisations also started in other countries – such as Canada and the United Kingdom. As a result of the development of such organisations, lifesaving techniques became standardised and competitions between competing clubs were established and have become popular.

== Swimwear ==
In the United Kingdom there was no law against nude swimming, but each town was free to make its own laws. In public baths, bathers wore the bathing costumes prescribed by town authorities. In rivers, lakes and streams men swam in the nude. In Australia, debate continued from the late 19th to the mid-20th century about what constituted appropriate bathing costume for both men and women. At one time, an ordinance suggesting men wear skirts to cover up in the sea resulted in mass public protests.

=== Women ===
In New South Wales and other parts of Australia, bathing in the sea was banned during daylight between 1838 and 1902, because women's swimming costumes were considered indecent despite being neck to knee and men often swam nude, as was mixed swimming. Bathing was segregated in the United Kingdom until 1901.

Annette Kellerman, an Australian swimmer championed the use of a one-piece swimsuit and toured throughout the world as the "Australian mermaid" and the "diving Venus". Kellerman was arrested on a Boston beach for public indecency for wearing her trademark one-piece swimsuit but by the 1910s the style was becoming widely acceptable.

In the 1940s, women’s magazines started using advertisements that encouraged sunbathing, with greater emphasis on sun tanning than swimming. A tan became a sign of wealth, indicating that the individual was wealthy enough to go on holidays to a warmer climate. To gain an "all over tan", women's swimsuits became as abbreviated as the wearer was daring enough to wear, with bikinis increasingly displacing the one-piece swimsuit as the most common swimwear after the 1950s, and with even briefer monokinis, string bikinis and G-strings also being seen. This fashion was met with considerable resistance from more conservative groups. In the 1950s, beach inspectors would harass women wearing shortish bikinis on Bondi Beach, Sydney; and G-strings continue to be banned on many beaches in the United States.

== Modern beach tourism ==
Modern airline transport has made travel to warmer locations more accessible and affordable. New tourist destinations have developed because of their access to good beaches. In Australia, the Gold Coast became a popular destination with the population growing from 33,716 in 1961 to 135,437 in 1981 and growing rapidly thereafter. The fastest growing regional areas in Australia Sunshine Coast, Gold Coast – Tweed and Cairns all having good beaches, warm weather and growth rates exceeding 20%.

In the United States, the Gold Coast (Florida) enjoyed similar growth as first the railroad and then aircraft brought tourists to its beaches for bathing. By 2000, the Miami and Fort Lauderdale areas had a total population of just under 4 million. Tourism is one of the areas largest employees with tourists from around the world travelling to Florida's beaches.

In Europe, the presence of good beaches for bathing, a warm climate and favourable exchange rates led to the rapid growth of tourism in Spain. By 1974, tourism had become Spain's leading industry and Spain is currently the world's second most popular tourism destination after France. Similarly, the popularity of Greek beaches was a major factor in tourism in Greece accounting for a quarter of Greece's foreign earnings.

== See also ==
- Lourdes water
