= Swimsuit =

Clothing worn for swimming

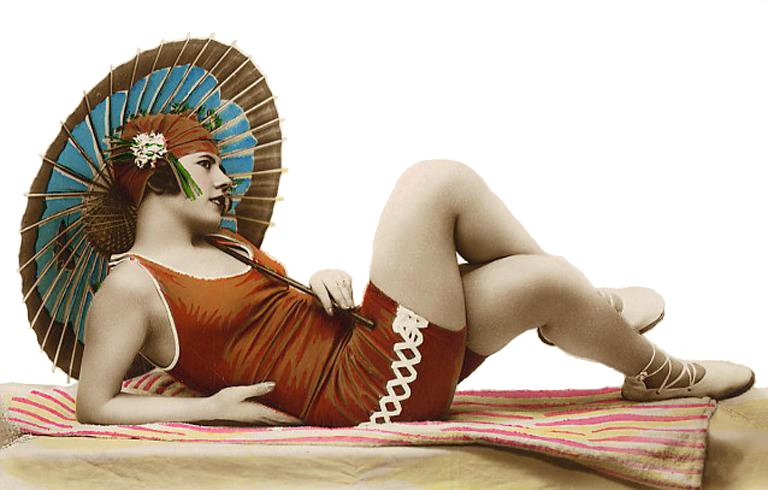
American 1920s woman's bathing suit

A swimsuit is an article of clothing designed to be worn by people engaging in a water-based activity or water sports, such as swimming, diving and surfing, or sun-orientated activities, such as sun bathing. Different types and styles may be worn by men, women, and children. Styles worn by men include boardshorts, jammers, swim trunks, briefs (also known as “Speedos”), while women wear one-piece, bikinis, and thongs. Swimsuits can be described by various names, some of which are used only in particular locations or for particular types of suit, including swimwear, bathing suit, bathing attire, swimming costume, bathing costume, swimming suit, swimmers, swimming togs, bathers, cossie (short for "costume"), or swimming trunks (swimwear that resembles shorts), besides others.

A swimsuit can be worn as an undergarment in sports that sometimes require a wetsuit or drysuit such as cold water swimming, water skiing, scuba diving, surfing, and wakeboarding. Swimsuits may also be worn to display the wearer's physical attributes, as in the case of beauty pageants or bodybuilding contests, and glamour photography and magazines like the annual Sports Illustrated Swimsuit Issue featuring models and sports personalities in swimsuits.

There is a very wide range of styles of modern swimsuits available, which vary as to body coverage and materials. The choice of style may depend on community standards of modesty, as well as current fashions, and personal preferences. The choice will also consider the occasion, for example whether it is to be worn for a passive occasion such as sunbathing or for an activity such as surfing or swimsuit competition. Swimwear universally covers at least the wearer's crotch area. According to international standards for social etiquette and swimming functionality, male swimwear usually leaves the upper body uncovered, while swimsuits for girls and women usually cover the chest or at least the nipples.

== Materials ==
Prior to the 1930s, swimsuits were typically made of wool; however, such suits did not hug the body and became heavy with water.

Rayon began to be used in the 1920s in the manufacture of tight-fitting swimsuits, but its durability, especially when wet, proved problematic, with jersey and silk also sometimes being used.

In the 1930s, new materials were being developed and used in swimwear, particularly latex and nylon. Swimsuits incorporating nylon dry more quickly than swimsuits made of common organic fibers, which can create a more comfortable experience for the wearer. Swimsuits gradually began hugging the body, especially women's swimsuits.

In the 1960s, spandex (Lycra) began to be used in swimsuits, usually combined with nylon, to make them fit snugly to the body. However, spandex is not particularly strong or durable, especially in chlorinated water in swimming pools and hot tubs.

Polyester is becoming more common as a durable, lightweight fabric for swimsuits, although it is not as stretchy as spandex.

Some companies have started to focus on recycled materials for their swimwear. They are working with companies that transform fishnets, nylon waste, and recovered plastic from shorelines, waterways and coastal communities into textile components.

== Swimsuit styles ==
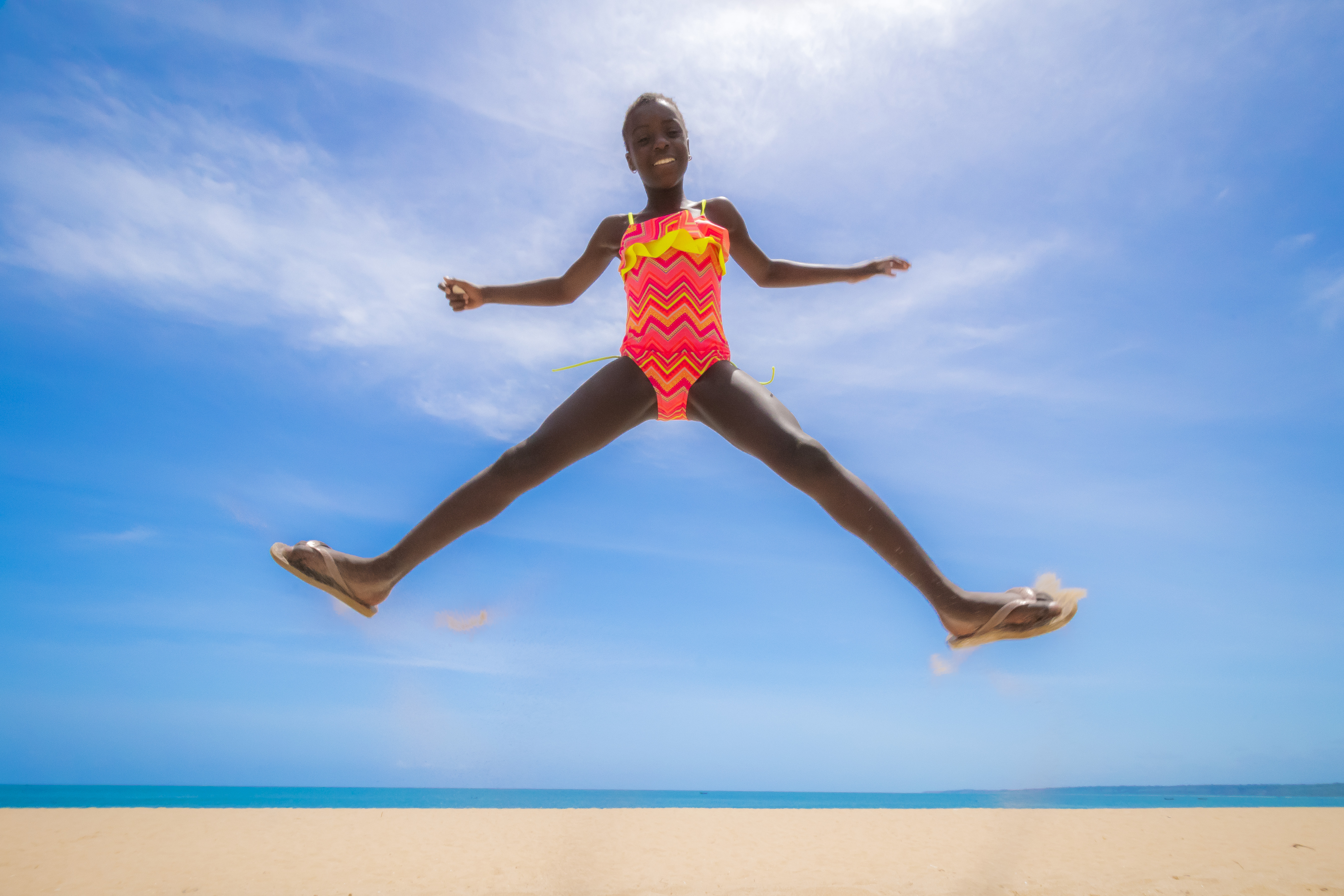
Unlike blue, gray, and white, neon pink and neon orange are highly visible colors underwater.

In Western culture, men's swimsuit styles include boardshorts, jammers, swim trunks, briefs (also known as "Speedos"), thongs, and g-strings, in order of decreasing lower body coverage, and women's swimsuits include one-piece, bikinis, or thongs. While they go through many trends in color, pattern, length, and cut, there is not much modification to the original variety of suit.

A recent innovation is the burkini, favored by some Muslim women, which covers the whole body and head (but not face) in a manner similar to a diver's wetsuit. These are an updated version of full-body swimwear, which has been available for centuries, but conforms with Islam's traditional emphasis on modest dress. In Egypt, the term "Sharia swimsuit" is used to describe full-body swimwear.

Swimsuit color affects swimmers' safety. A blue, white, or gray swimsuit may be nearly invisible when the swimmer is underwater, which can make it more difficult for a lifeguard to spot a drowning swimmer. The most visible swimsuits underwater have large, solid blocks of bright neon colors, such as neon pink or neon orange. Solid neon colors are more visible than red or multi-colored swimsuits.

=== Unisex styles ===
Name	Image	Description
Drag suits	A drag suit	A drag suit is a pair of baggy square-cut or brief-style trunks that competitive swimmers may wear over their normal suit to provide extra resistance ("drag") from the water. This allows the swimmer to get more out of their training than they would without a drag suit.
Dry suits	Two divers wearing dry suits	A dry suit or drysuit provides the wearer with environmental protection by way of thermal insulation and exclusion of water, and is worn by divers, boaters, water sports enthusiasts, and others who work or play in or near cold or contaminated water. A dry suit normally protects the whole body except the head, hands, and possibly the feet. In hazmat configurations, however, all of these are covered as well.
Racing suits	Three women wearing racing suits	Swimsuits made of technologically advanced fabrics biomimetically designed with a surface that mimics the rough shark denticles to reduce drag along with key areas of the body. The characteristics of the fabric improve shape retention and increase muscle compression to reduce vibration and retain muscle shape to reduce fatigue and power loss. Available in a variety of cuts such as bodyskin, legskin, high cut swim briefs, and kneeskin.
Rash guard (also known as rash vest or rashie)	A long-sleeved rash guard	A type of athletic shirt made of spandex and nylon or polyester, used to protect against rashes from abrasion (like wax-based chafing from sliding on and off of a surf board) or sun exposure. Rash guards may be worn as an alternative to wetsuits during warmer weather. They may also offer UV protection.
Sling swimsuit	A man wearing a sling swimsuit	The sling swimsuit is a one-piece swimsuit which is supported by fabric at the neck. The sling swimsuit is also known by a variety of names including "suspender bikini", "sling bikini", "slingkini", "suspender thong", "slingshot swimsuit" or just "slingshot". It is so named because of its resemblance to the Y-shape frame of a slingshot. It is sometimes listed as a bikini variant. Monokini types also exist. When designed for or worn by a man, it is often called a "mankini". The image to the left is of a man wearing a green mankini, a swimsuit made famous by the 2006 film Borat.
Swim shirt	A woman wearing a swim shirt	A more comfortable and casually worn athletic shirt that protects against sun exposure and chafing. It is often used as a simple alternative to sunscreen while swimming to prevent possible skin cancer, and many swim shirts have a UPF rating of 50+ for this purpose.
Wetsuits	Two teenage surfers wearing wetsuits	Wetsuits are insulated, close-fitting suits designed for prolonged immersion, usually in the context of snorkeling, scuba diving, or surfing, and other water boardsports. Made from neoprene, they come in different thicknesses and styles. Wetsuits keep the wearer warm by trapping a thin layer of water close to the skin which heats up due to body temperature.

=== Women's swimsuits ===
Name	Image	Description
Bikini (also known as a two-piece)	Two women with bikinis	One piece covers the breasts, and the other the crotch, leaving an uncovered area between the two. Bikinis are available in many stylistic variations.
Burkini (also called burqini)	A mannequin wearing a burkini	Two piece that covers the whole body except feet and hands, and which may have a hood to cover the head (but not face), made of ordinary swimsuit fabric, in a shape similar to a diver's wetsuit. Although sometimes labeled as a religious garment, it is also worn for health reasons by lifeguards and other women who are high risk for skin cancer, or who do not feel comfortable wearing skimpier alternatives. The burqini was originally designed in Australia by Aheda Zanetti. Her company Ahiida owns the trademarks to the words burkini and burqini, but they are sometimes used as generic terms for similar forms of swimwear. Attempts to ban burqinis in France for being too religious led to significantly increased sales worldwide.
Monokini	A woman wearing a monokini	The monokini, also known as a "topless bikini" or "unikini"), was designed by Rudi Gernreich in 1964, consisting of only a brief, close-fitting bottom and two thin straps; it was the first women's topless swimsuit. Gernreich's revolutionary and controversial design included a bottom that "extended from the midriff to the upper thigh" and was "held up by shoestring laces that make a halter around the neck." Some credit Gernreich's design with initiating, or describe it as a symbol of, the sexual revolution. The image to the left is of a woman wearing a monokini in 2010.
One-piece (also known as tank suit, maillot, or singlet)	A woman wearing a one-piece swimsuit	Probably the most common form of swimsuit, this is the inspiration for the tank top as a mainstream article of clothing. The name "tank suit" is also supposed to be derived from the term "swimming tank", an obsolete term for what is now called a swimming pool. Also called a singlet from which evolved the wrestling singlet. A male under-garment in the same form was also called a singlet.
Tankini (also known as two piece)	A woman wearing a tankini	One piece covers the breasts and stomach (like a tank top), the other the crotch and buttocks. Invented in 1998 by Anne Cole (1926–2017), the founder of the brand Anne Cole.
Tank top and pants	A woman wearing a tank top and pants	Tank top covering pants prevents water parachuting pants off.

=== Men's swimsuits ===
Name	Image	Description
Boardshorts (also "boardies" in Australia)	A man at the beach wearing boardshorts	Boardshorts are a longer version of trunks that come to or past the knee. They usually have a non-elastic waistband, and will give a tight fit around the torso. Boardshorts were originally developed for various board sports such as surfing, paddleboarding, and wakeboarding.
Jammer	A man on a diving board wearing a jammer	A type of men's swimwear worn primarily by competitive athletes, somewhat resembling cycling shorts or compression shorts.
Square cut swim trunks	A man running in the ocean with square cut swim trunks	A swimwear style similar to swim briefs, but with a more conservative cut. They can be compared to boxer briefs but with nylon/spandex composite or polyester fabric.
Swim briefs (also known as racing briefs, Speedos, competition briefs, bathers, brief or low rise sungas, racer bathers, trunks, or "swimmers" in Australia)	A boy wearing swim briefs	Swim briefs, often made of wool and held in place with a military-style canvas belt at the waist, go back at least to the 1930s. They can be seen in hundreds of print ads, worn by muscleman Charles Atlas, and were very popular. Although in a style that today appears similar to underwear briefs, it is likely that the swimwear preceded the underwear, A nylon version (without the belt), pictured at left, was launched at the 1956 Melbourne Olympics by Speedo. Swim briefs are now often made of a nylon and spandex composite, while some longer lasting suits are made from polyester. The style varies from a full seat to thong or g-string. Most swim briefs have a beige or white lining on the inside front made of a similar fabric.
Tank top and pants	A man wearing a tank top and pants	Tank top covering pants prevents water parachuting pants off.
Trunks (also known as swim trunks generally, also known as boardshorts in Australia or shorts in UK)	A man wearing swim trunks	In the US, this describes a loose, mid-thigh style of swimwear, made of 100% polyester or 100% nylon fabric. They are usually shorter than boardshorts but longer than boxer shorts. They feature a polyester liner inside the shorts. Although trunks have been used as swimwear since the 1940s, their heyday was in the 1990s when they were highly popularized thanks in part to TV shows like Baywatch. Today, they have been eclipsed by boardshorts for beachwear among teenagers and young adults in North America and some other places. They remain the norm with older age groups and young children. In other cultures (particularly the UK), the term "trunks" is used to describe swim briefs, although it has been increasingly common for any men's swimwear to be generically described as "trunks".

== Body coverage ==
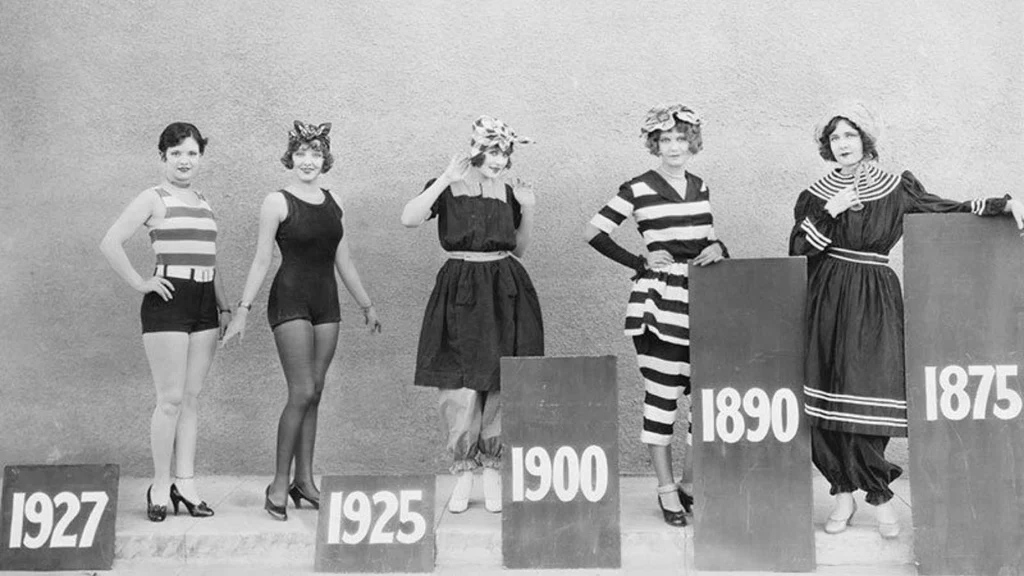
A 1927 photograph illustrating the evolution of women's swimsuits since 1875

Swimsuits can be skin-tight or loose-fitting. They are often lined with another layer of fabric if the outer fabric becomes transparent when wet.

Swimsuits range from designs that almost completely cover the body to designs that expose almost all of the body. The choice of swimsuit primarily depends on the activity of the wearer, from tight briefs for men for competitive diving and water polo to boardshorts for surfing; although ironically female competitive divers usually wear full one-piece suits while female competitive surfers often wear bikinis. Secondary considerations are personal and community standards of modesty depending on the location and social setting, how much sun protection is desired, and prevailing fashions. Almost all swimsuits cover intimate body parts including genitals and pubic hair, while most except thongs or g-strings (also called Brazilians) cover much or all of the buttocks.

Most swimsuits in western culture leave at least the head, shoulders, arms, and lower part of the leg (below the knee) exposed. Women's swimsuits generally cover at least the areola and bottom half of the breasts.

Both men and women may sometimes wear swimsuits covering more of the body when swimming in cold water (see also wetsuit and dry suit). In colder temperatures, swimsuits are needed to conserve body heat and protect the body core from hypothermia.

== Competitive swimwear ==
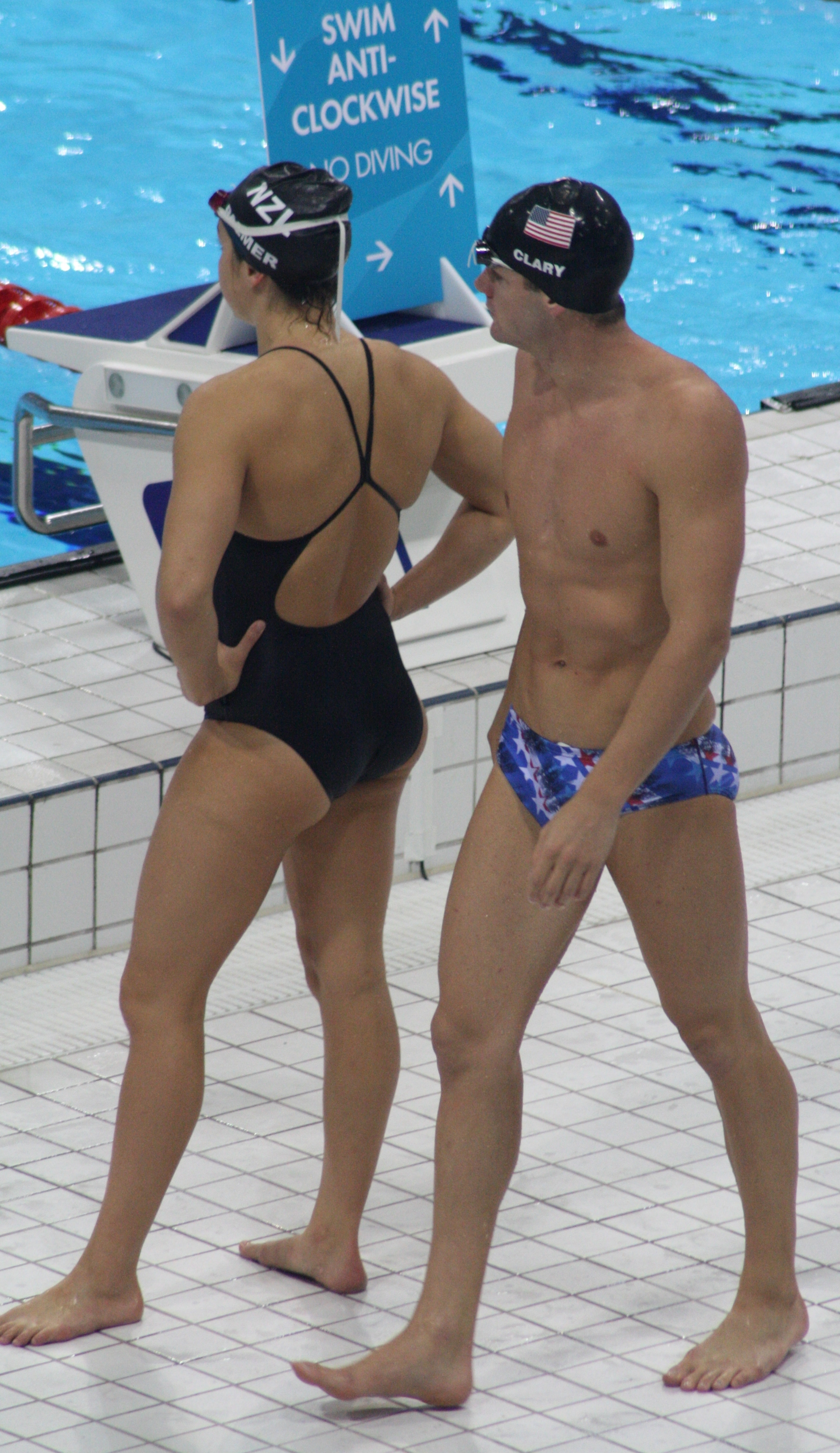
Olympic swimming gold medalist Tyler Clary of U.S. walks wearing men's swim briefs, while Michelle Bremer of New Zealand looks on in a racerback one-piece swimsuit, 2012.

Competitive swimwear refers to the swimsuit, clothing, equipment and accessories used in the aquatic sports of swimming, diving, synchronized swimming, triathlon and water polo.

Some swimsuits are designed specifically for swimming competitions where they may be constructed of a special low-resistance fabric that reduces skin drag. Most competitive swimmers wear special swimsuits including partial bodysuits, racerback styles, jammers and racing briefs to assist their glide through the water thus gaining a speed advantage.

For diving in water temperatures above 25 °C (77 °F), special bodysuits called "dive skins" are worn. These suits are made from spandex and provide little thermal protection, but they protect the skin from jellyfish stings, sunburn, and abrasion. This kind of suit is also known as a 'Stinger Suit'. Some divers wear a dive skin under a wetsuit, which allows easier donning and (for those who experience skin problems from neoprene) provides additional comfort.

Unlike regular swimsuits, which are designed mainly for aesthetic appearances, swimsuits intended to be worn during competitions are manufactured to assist the athlete in swimming competitions. They reduce friction and drag in the water, increasing the swimmer's forward motion efficiency. The tight fits allow for easy movement and are said to reduce muscle vibration, thus reducing drag. This also reduces the possibility that a high-forward dive will remove a diver's swimwear. Starting around 2000, to improve the effectiveness of the swimsuits, engineers have taken to designing them to replicate the skin of sea-based animals, sharks in particular.

In July 2009, World Aquatics (then FINA) voted to ban non-textile (non-woven) swimsuits in competitive events from 2010. The new policy was implemented to combat the issues associated with performance-enhancing swimsuits, hindering the ability to accurately measure the performance of swimmers. Subsequently, the new ruling states that male swimsuits may maximally cover the area from the navel to the knee and female counterparts from the shoulder to the knee.

Some swimmers use a specialized training suit called drag suits to artificially increase drag during practice. Drag suits are swimwear with an outer layer of looser fabric – often mesh or nylon – to increase resistance against the water and build up the swimmer's endurance. They come in a variety of styles, but most resemble a looser fitting square-cut or swim brief.

== Swimwear and hygiene ==
Germs, bacteria, and mold can grow very quickly on wet bathing suits. Medical professionals warn that wearing damp swimwear for long periods of time can cause a number of infections and rashes in children and adults, and warn against sharing bathing suits with others. They suggest that changing out of a wet bathing suit right away can help prevent vaginal infections, itching and/or jock itch.

In public swimming pools in France for reasons of hygiene, it is only permitted to wear closer fitting styles of swimwear. Men, for instance, must wear "Speedo"-style bathing suits and not baggy shorts or trunks.

== History ==
=== Pre-20th century ===
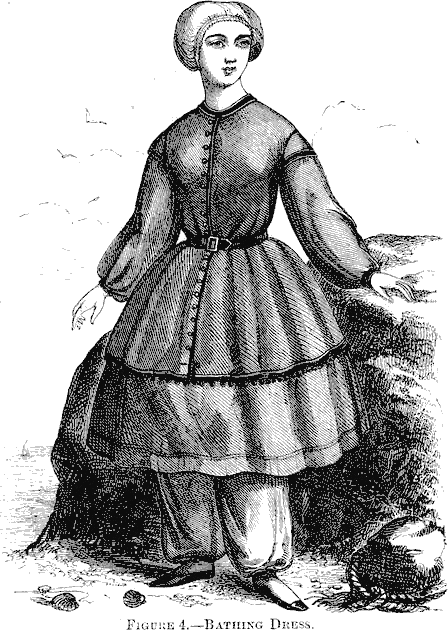
1858 woman's bathing suit

In classical antiquity swimming and bathing were done naked. There are Roman murals which show women playing sports and exercising wearing two-piece suits covering the areas around their breasts and hips in a fashion remarkably similar to the present-day bikini. However, there is no evidence that they were used for swimming. All classical pictures of swimming show nude swimmers.

In various cultural traditions one swims, if not in the nude, in a version in suitable material of a garment or undergarment commonly worn on land, e.g. a loincloth such as the Japanese man's fundoshi.

In the United Kingdom, until the mid-19th century there was no law against nude swimming, and each town was free to make its own laws. For example, the Bath Corporation official bathing dress code of 1737 prescribed, for men:

It is Ordered Established and Decreed by this Corporation that no Male person above the age of ten years shall at any time hereafter go into any Bath or Baths within this City by day or by night without a Pair of Drawers and a Waistcoat on their bodies.

In rivers, lakes, streams and the sea, men swam in the nude, where the practice was common. Those who did not swim in the nude stripped to their underwear. The English practice of men swimming in the nude was banned in the United Kingdom in 1860. Drawers, or caleçons as they were called, came into use in the 1860s. Even then there were many who protested against them and wanted to remain in the nude. Francis Kilvert described men's bathing suits coming into use in the 1870s as "a pair of very short red and white striped drawers".

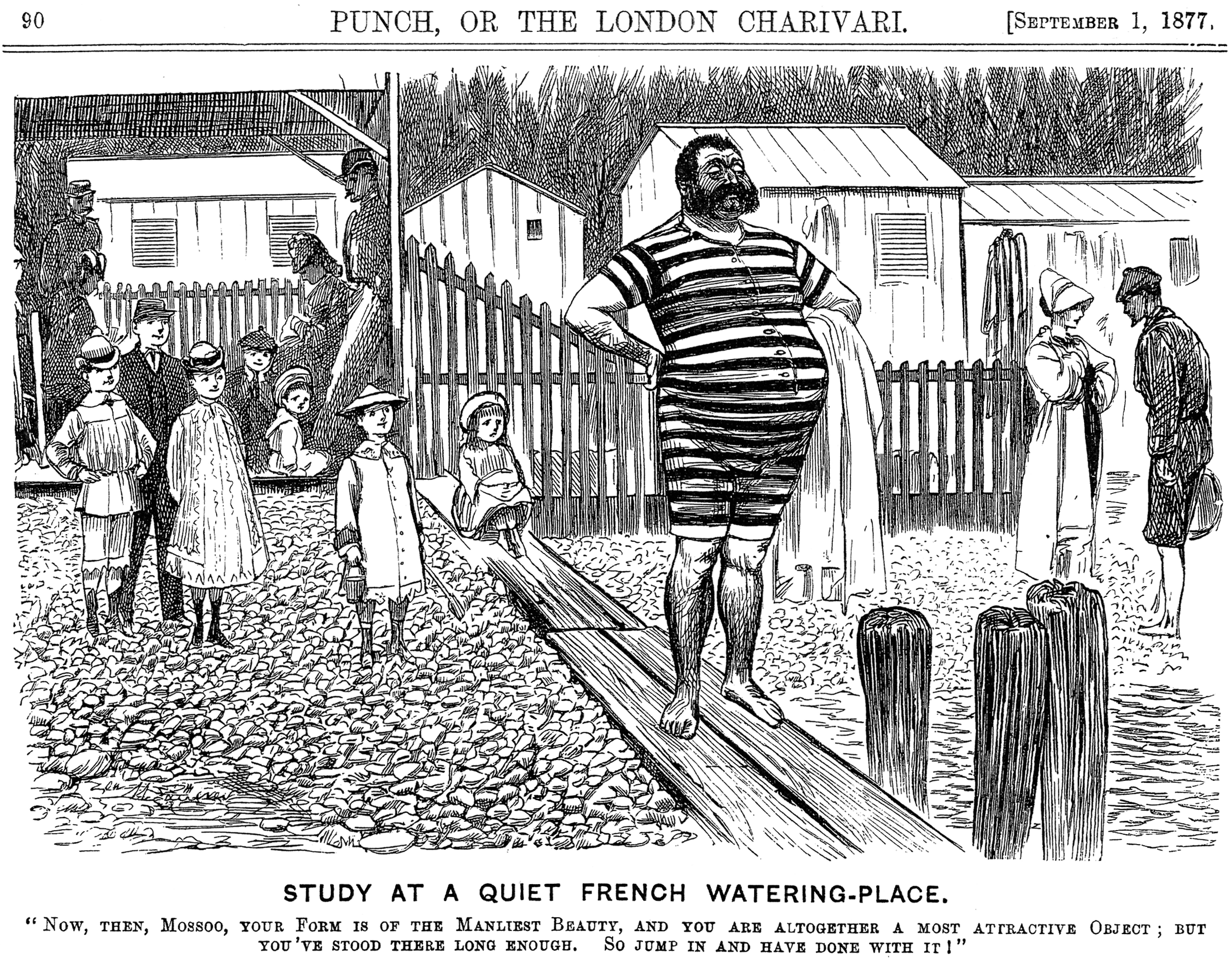
Cartoon by George du Maurier in Punch, 1877, showing men's and children's bathing suits

Female bathing costumes were derived from those worn at Bath and other spas. It would appear that until the 1670s, nude female bathing in the spas was the norm, and that after that time women bathed clothed. Celia Fiennes gave a detailed description of the standard ladies' bathing costume in 1687:

The Ladyes go into the bath with Garments made of a fine yellow canvas, which is stiff and made large with great sleeves like a parson's gown; the water fills it up so that it is borne off that your shape is not seen, it does not cling close as other linning, which Lookes sadly in the poorer sort that go in their own linning. The Gentlemen have drawers and wastcoates of the same sort of canvas, this is the best linning, for the bath water will Change any other yellow.

The Bath Corporation official bathing dress code of 1737 prescribed, for women:

No Female person shall at any time hereafter go into a Bath or Baths within this City by day or by night without a decent Shift on their bodies.

The Expedition of Humphry Clinker was published in 1771 and its description of ladies' bathing costume is different from that of Celia Fiennes a hundred years earlier:

The ladies wear jackets and petticoats of brown linen, with chip hats, in which they fix their handkerchiefs to wipe the sweat from their faces; but, truly, whether it is owing to the steam that surrounds them, or the heat of the water, or the nature of the dress, or to all these causes together, they look so flushed, and so frightful, that I always turn my eyes another way.

Penelope Byrde points out that Smollett's description may not be accurate, for he describes a two-piece costume, not the one piece shift or smock that most people describe and is depicted in contemporary prints. His description does, however, tally with Elizabeth Grant's description of the guide's costume at Ramsgate in 1811. The only difference is in the fabric the costumes are made of. Flannel, however, was a common fabric for sea bathing costumes as many believed the warmer fabric was necessary in cold water.

In the 18th century women wore "bathing gowns" in the water; these were long dresses of fabrics that would not become transparent when wet, with weights sewn into the hems so that they would not rise up in the water. The men's swim suit, a rather form-fitting wool garment with long sleeves and legs similar to long underwear, was developed and would change little for a century.

In the 19th century, the woman's double suit was common, comprising a gown from shoulder to knees plus a set of trousers with leggings going down to the ankles.

In the Victorian era, popular beach resorts were commonly equipped with bathing machines designed to avoid the exposure of people in swimsuits, especially to people of the opposite sex.

In the United States, beauty pageants of women in bathing costumes became popular from the 1880s. However, such events were not regarded as respectable. Beauty contests became more respectable with the first modern Miss America contest held in 1921, though less respectable beauty contests continued to be held. Miss America ended its swimsuit competition in 2018.

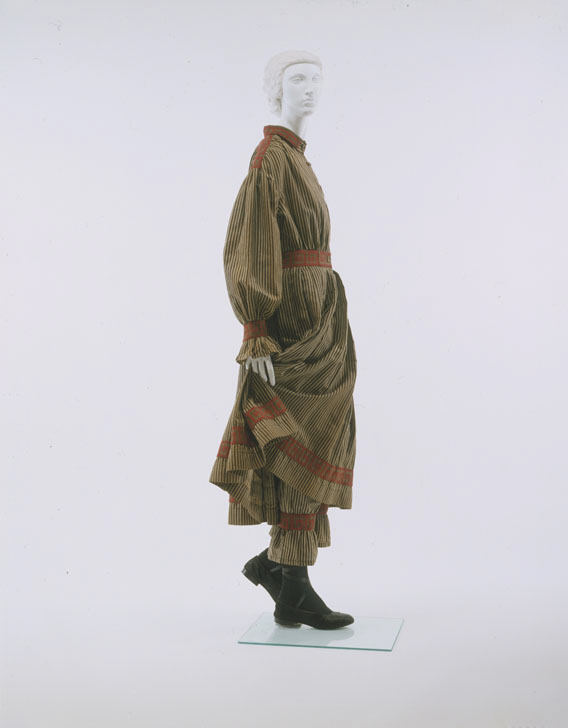
1870s bathing dress

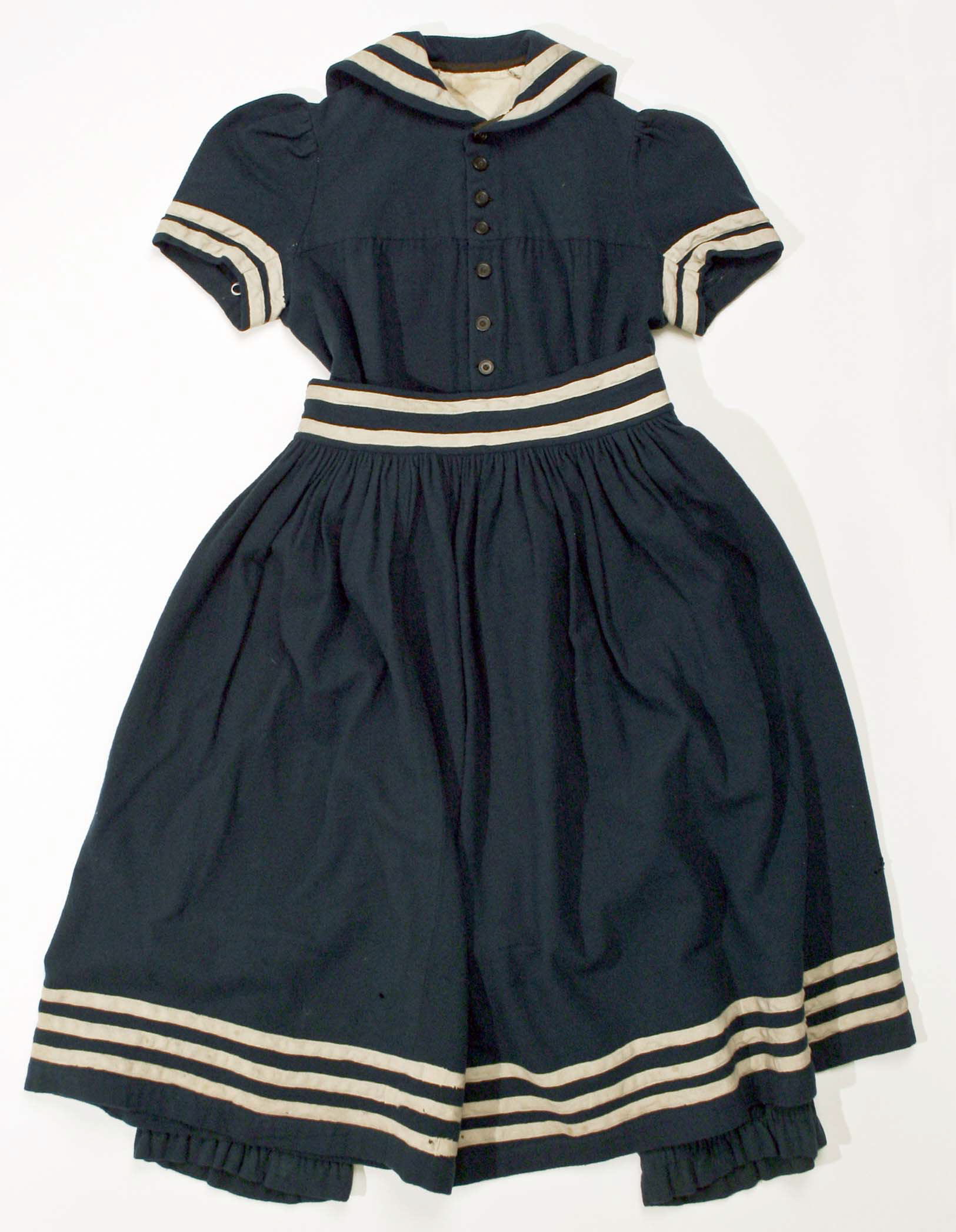
Bathing suit, c. 1885

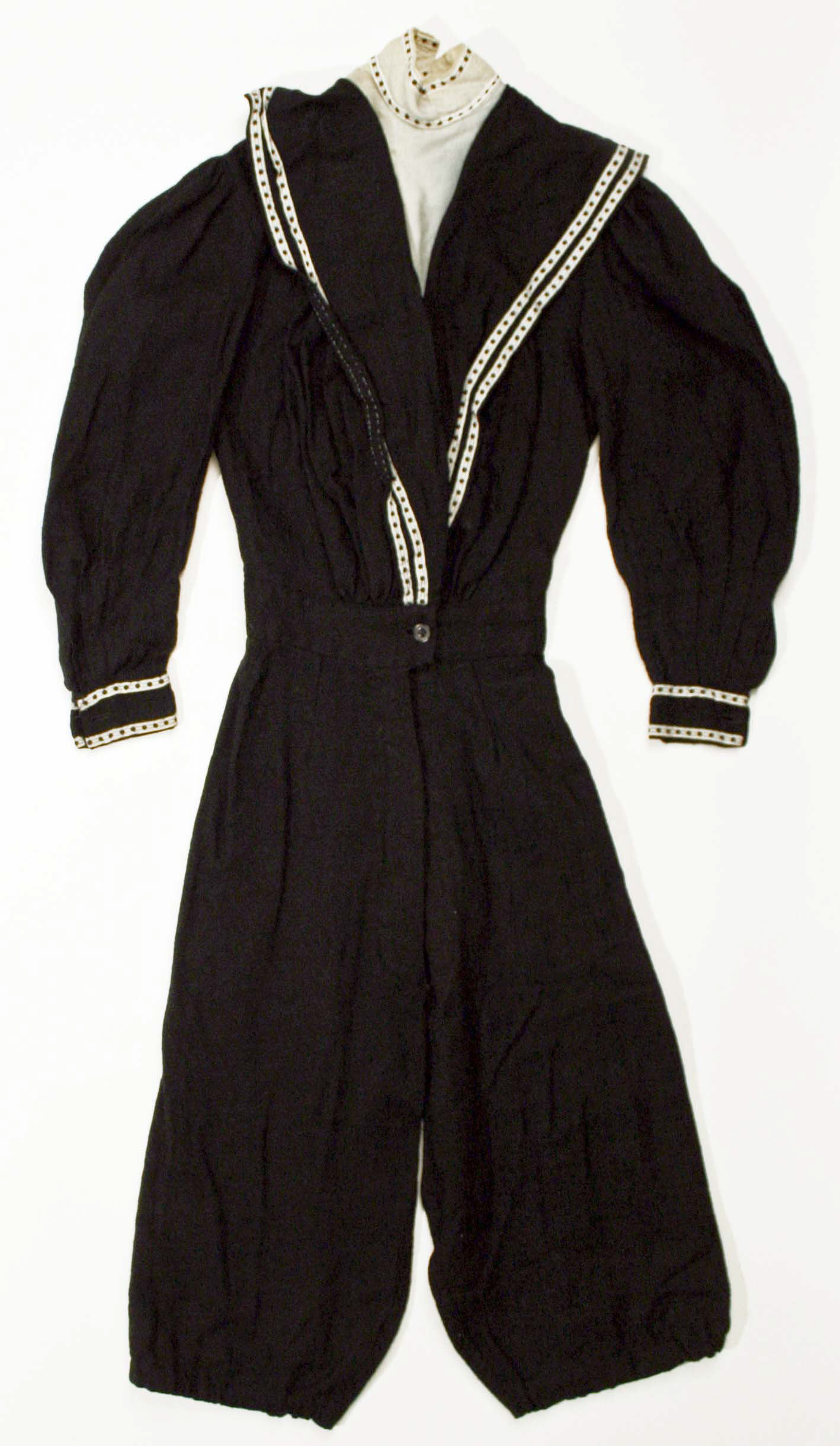
Bathing suit, 1890–1895

=== 20th century ===
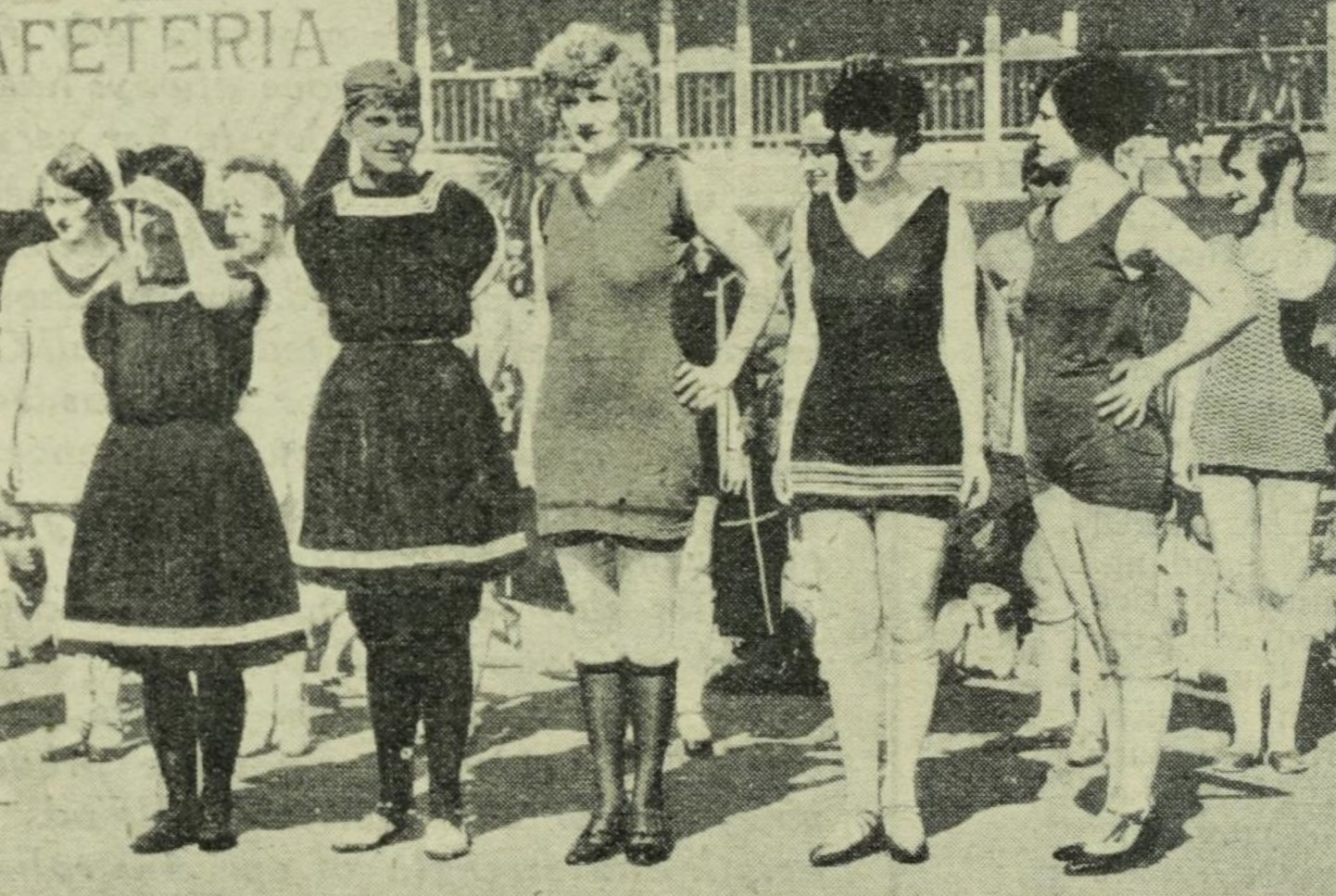
Five women wearing examples of bathing-suits over the years from 1900 to 1925

The 1907 Sydney bathing costume protests were carried out in Australia after an ordinance was proposed that would have required males to wear a skirt-like tunic. In 1935, a similar ordinance was proposed, requiring males to wear the Spooner bathing costume instead of the 'disgraceful' swim trunks.

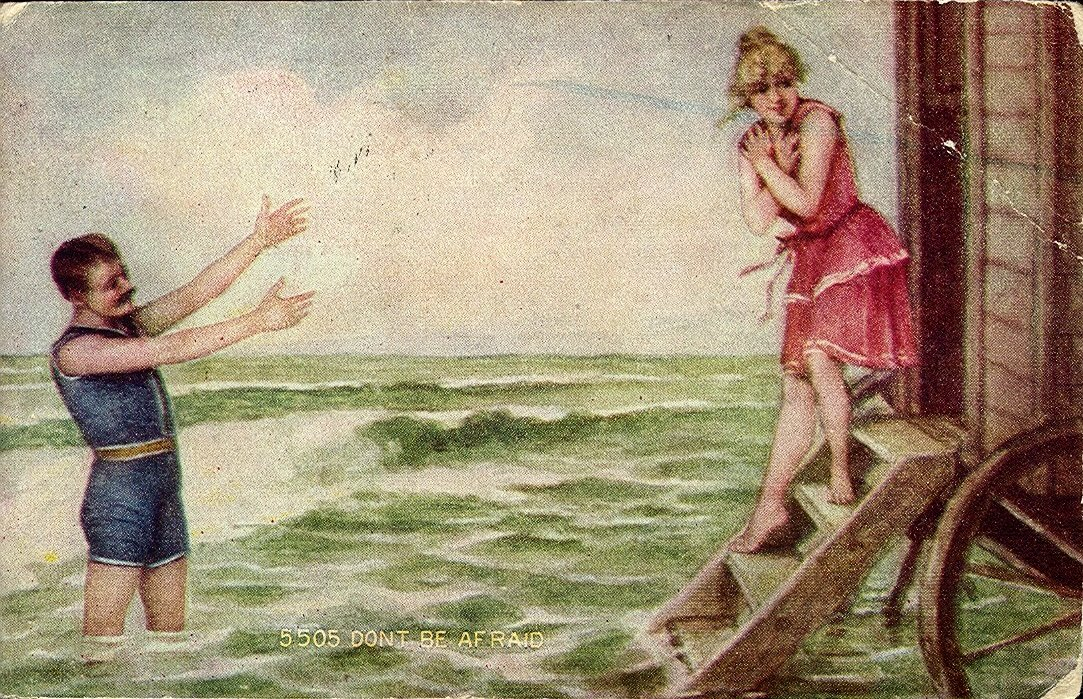
Man and woman in swimsuits, c. 1910; she is exiting a bathing machine

In 1907, the swimmer Annette Kellerman from Australia visited the United States as an "underwater ballerina", a version of synchronized swimming involving diving into glass tanks. She was arrested for indecent exposure because her swimsuit showed arms, legs and the neck. Kellerman changed the suit to have long arms and legs and a collar, still keeping the close fit that revealed the shapes underneath. She later starred in several movies, including one about her life. She marketed a line of bathing suits and her style of one-piece suits came to be known as "the Annette Kellerman". The Annette Kellerman was considered the most offensive style of swimsuit in the 1920s and became the focus of censorship efforts.

Despite opposition from some groups, the form-fitting style proved popular. It was not long before swimwear started to shrink further. At first arms were exposed and then legs up to mid-thigh. Necklines receded from around the neck down to around the top of the bosom. The development of new fabrics allowed for new varieties of more comfortable and practical swimwear.

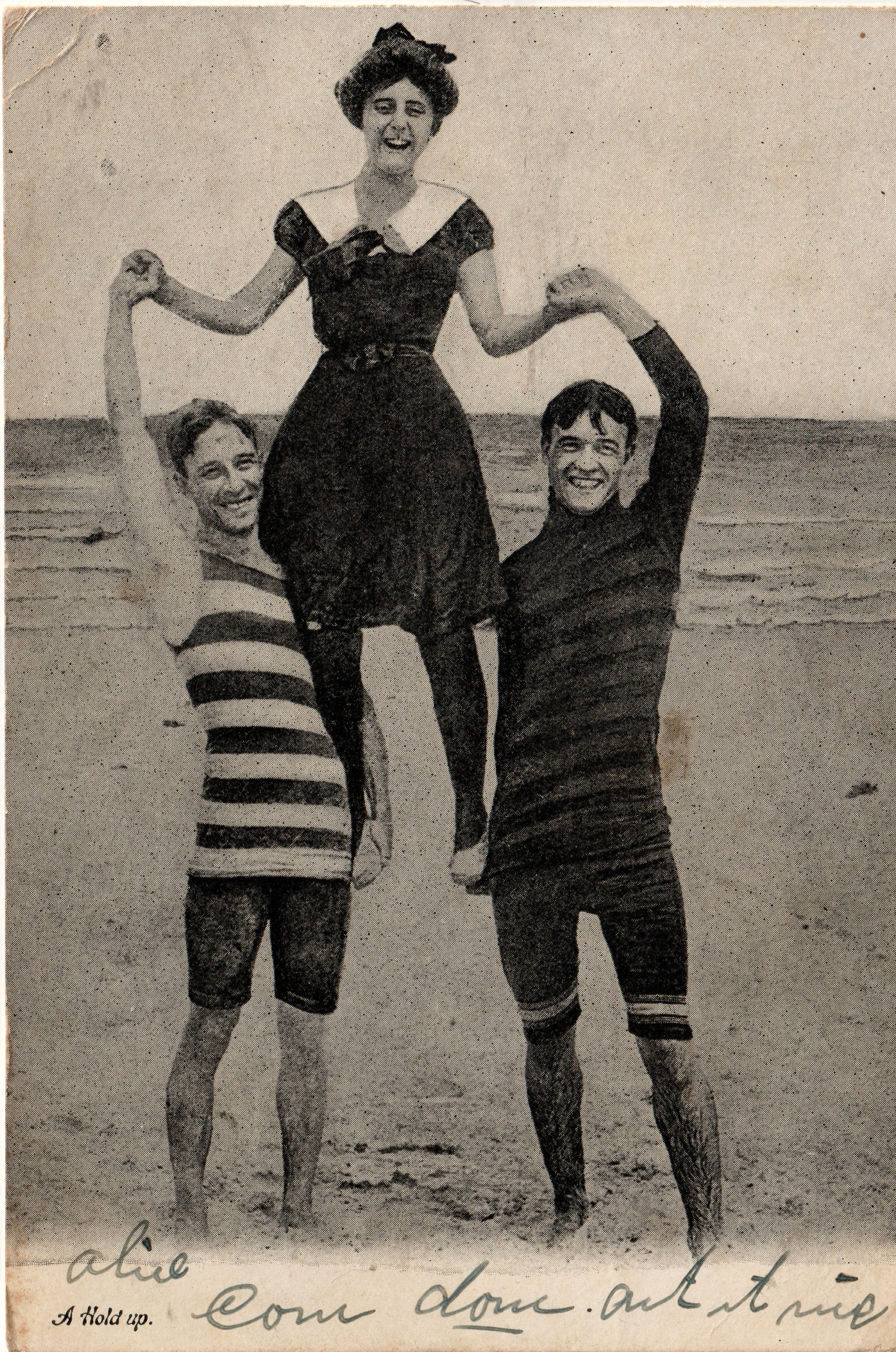
Two men and a woman wearing swimsuits in about 1905. United States

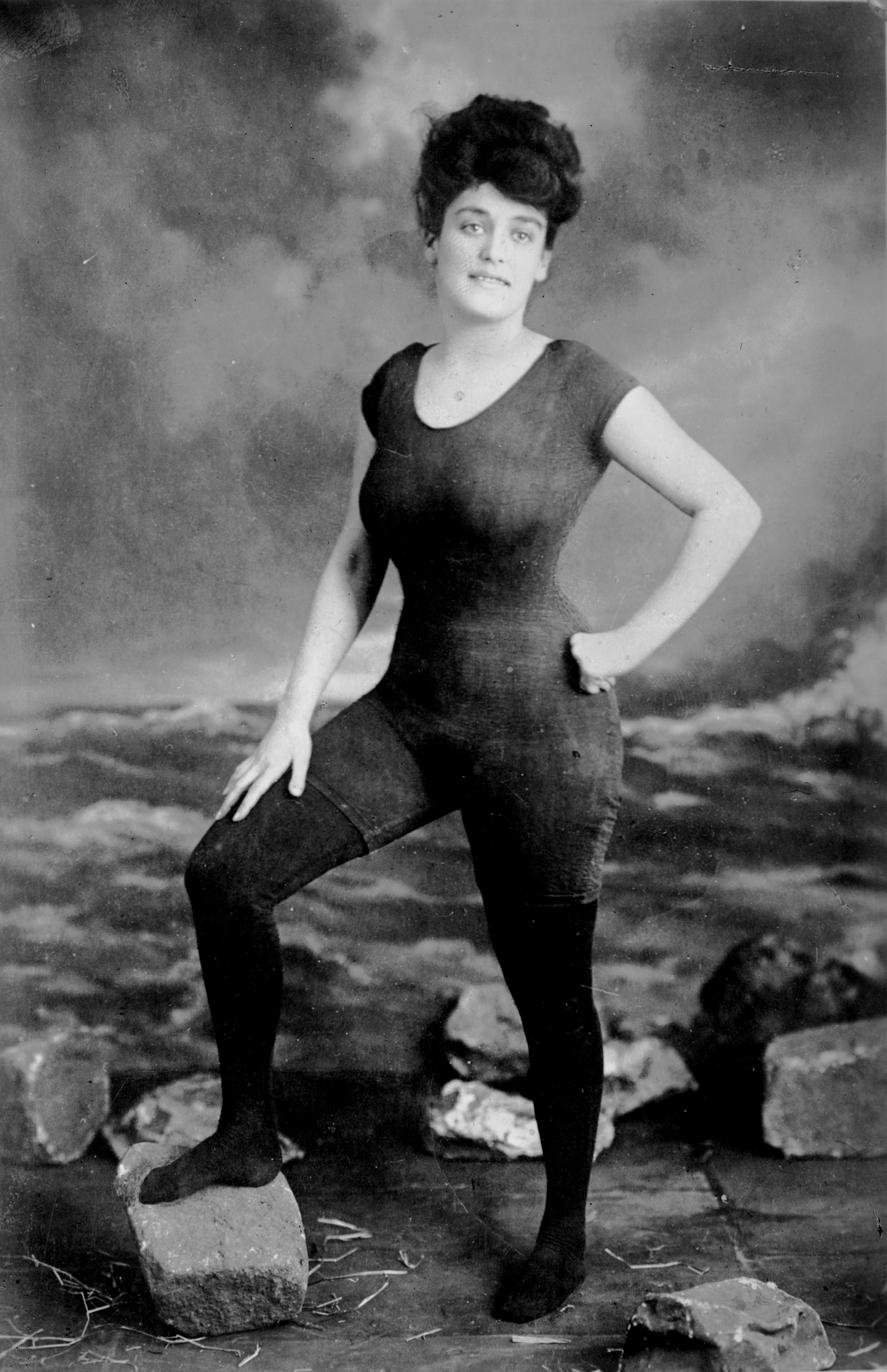
Annette Kellerman in her one-piece athletic swimming suit

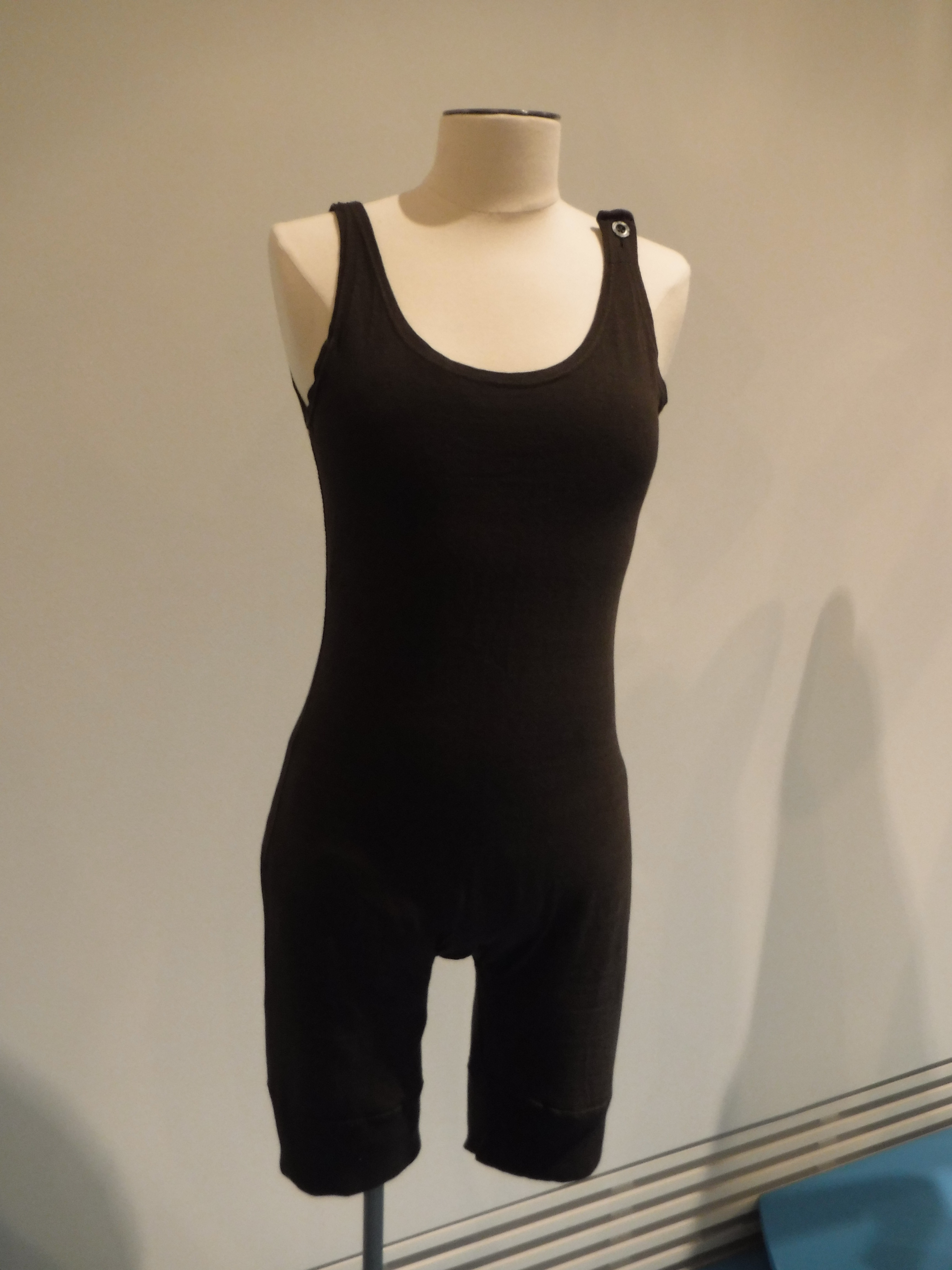
Cotton jersey bathing suit c. 1910s

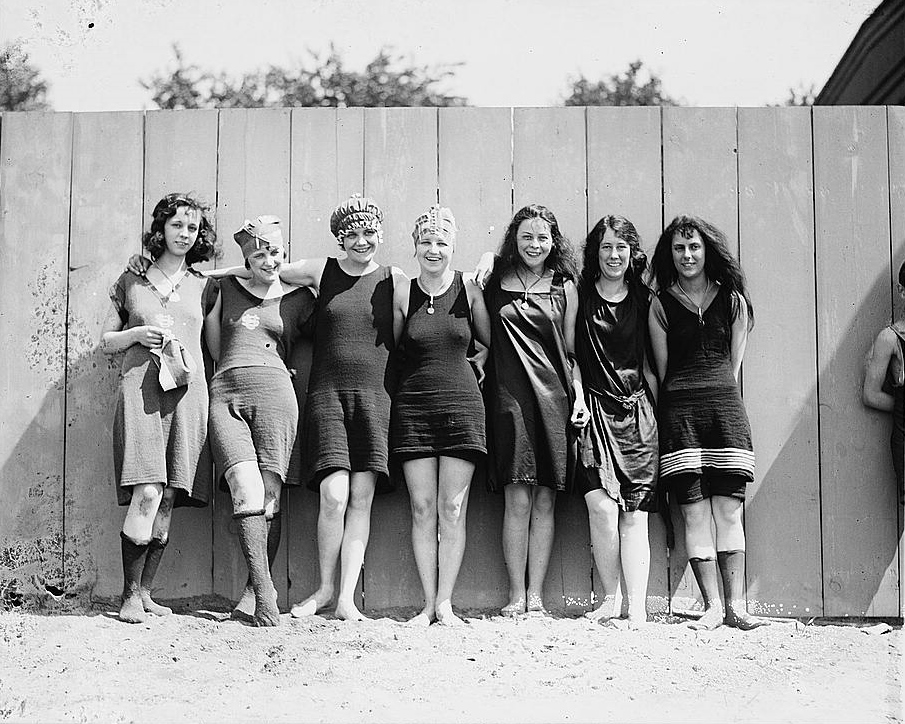
Tank top and pants: group, 1920, Washington

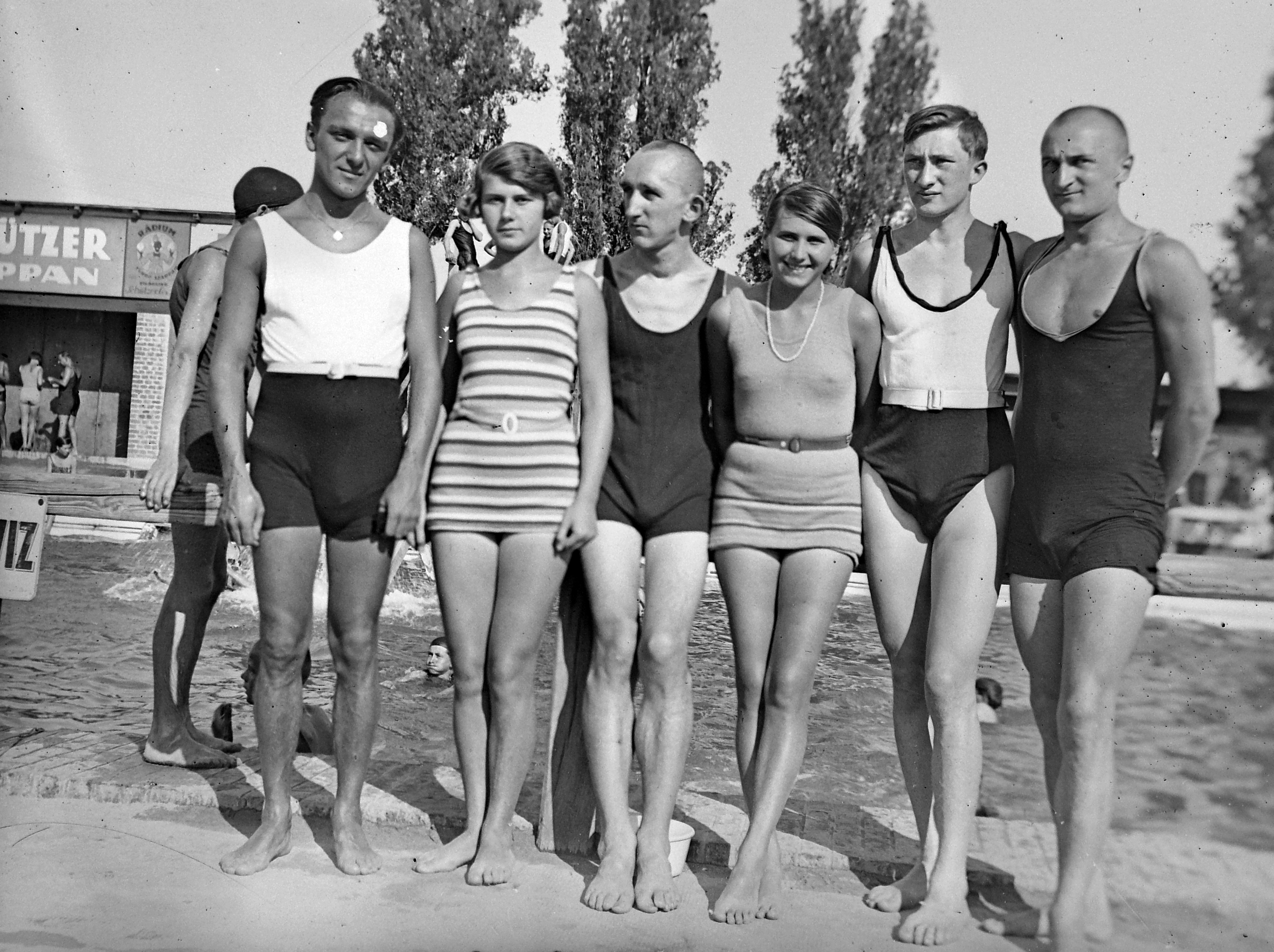
Swimsuits, 1924, Hungary

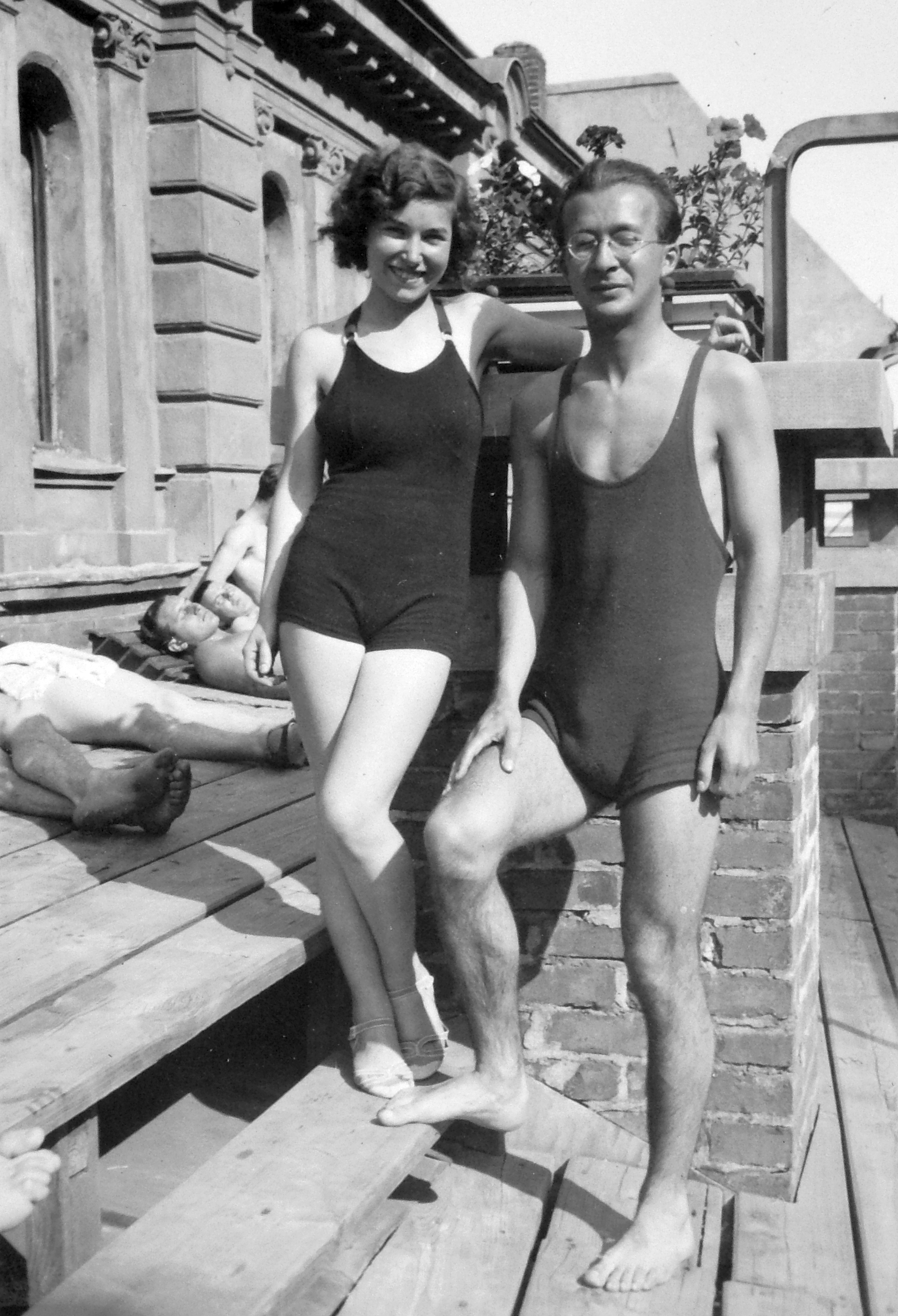
Swimsuits, 1936, Hungary

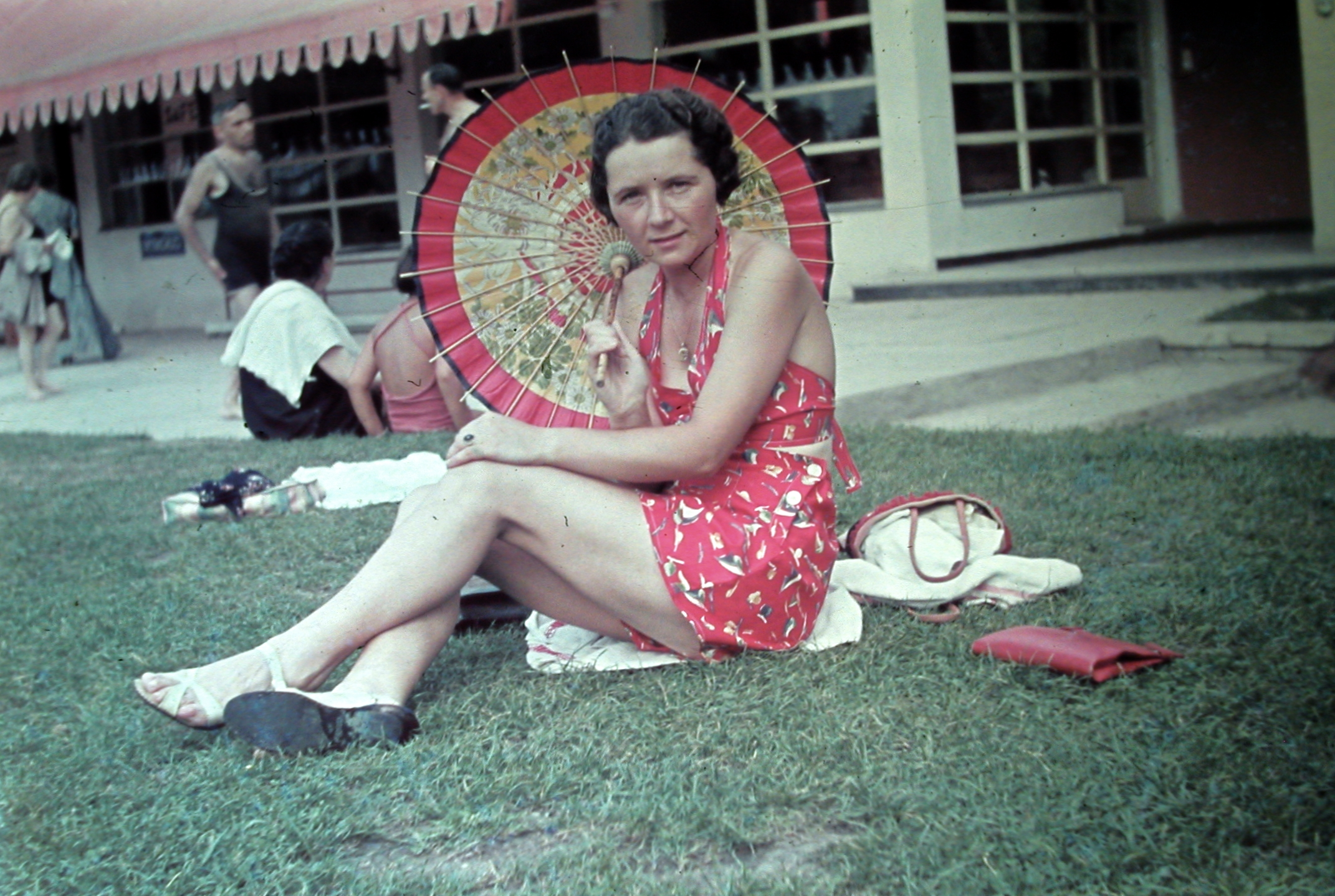
Swimsuit, 1939, Hungary

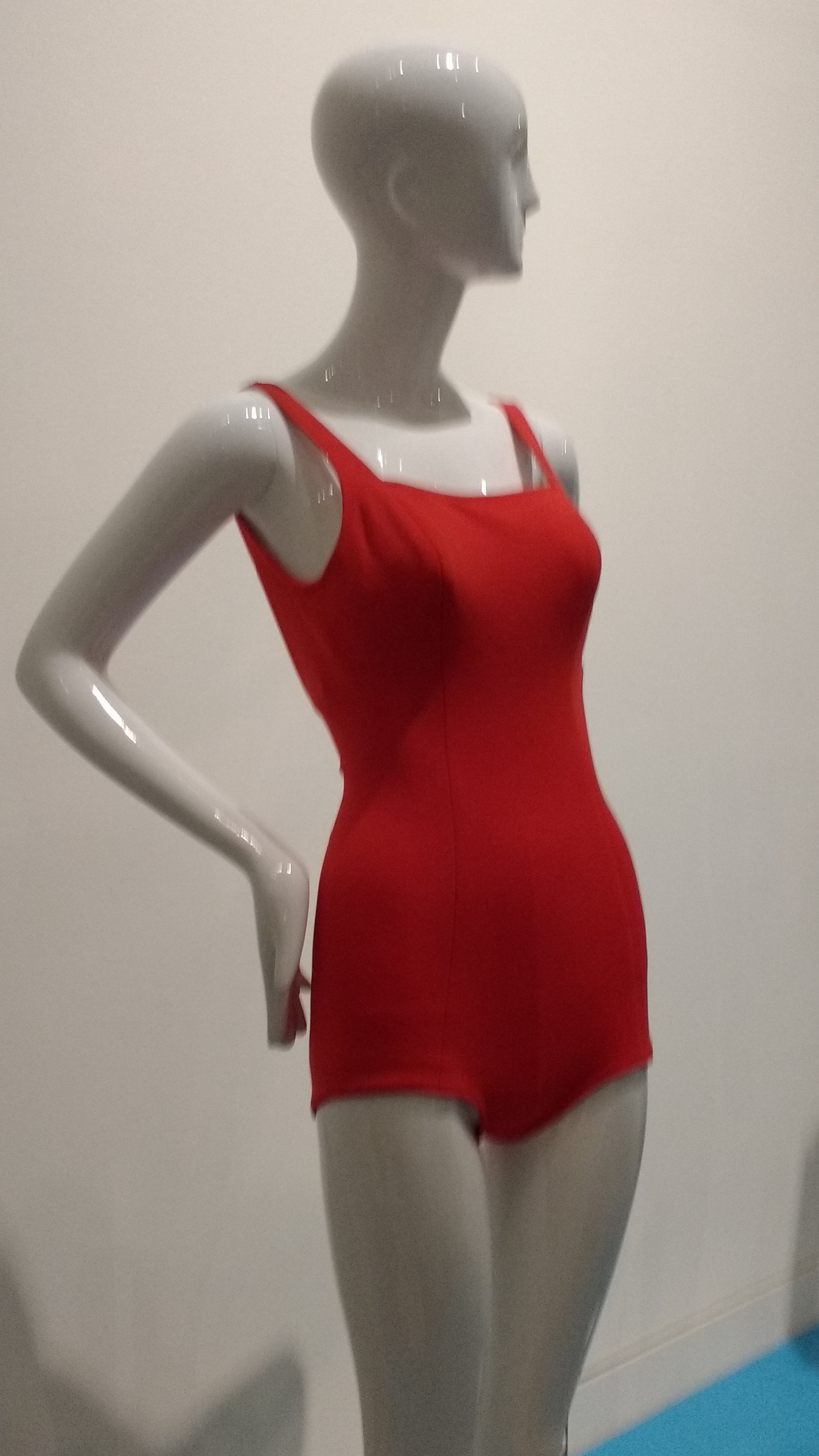
Jantzen Helanca knitted nylon swimsuit c. 1955–1965

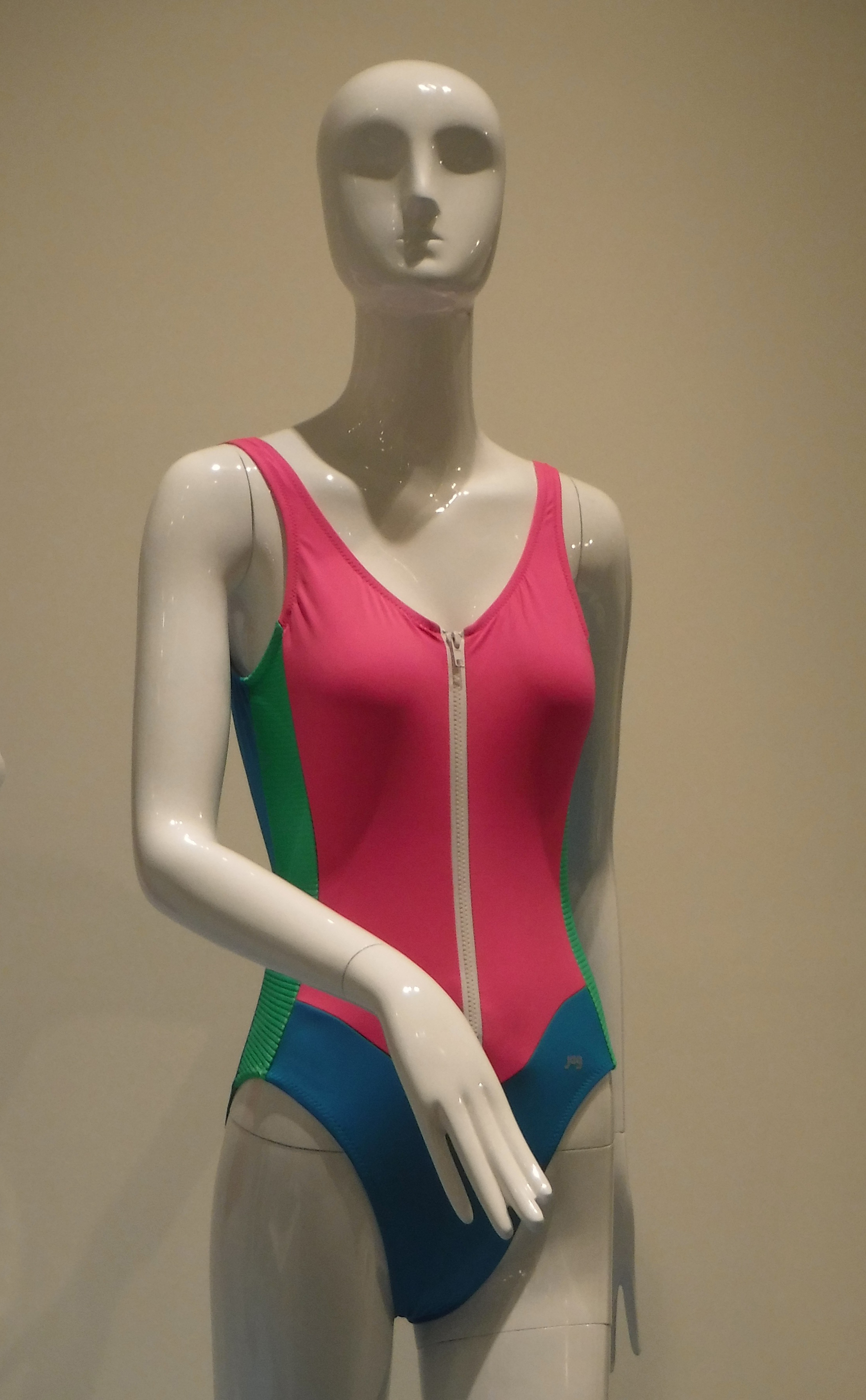
JAG high cut zippered swimsuit c. 1985–1995

Due to the figure-hugging nature of these garments, glamour photography since the 1940s and 1950s has often featured people wearing swimsuits. This type of glamour photography eventually evolved into swimsuit photography exemplified by the annual Sports Illustrated Swimsuit Issue. Beauty contests also required contestants to wear form-fitting swimsuits.

Louis Réard, a French automobile engineer and clothing designer, introduced the modern two-piece bikini on July 5, 1946. He introduced his design four days after the first test of a nuclear weapon at the Bikini Atoll. The newspapers were full of news about it and Reard hoped for the same with his design, hence the name.

Through the 1950s, it was thought proper for the lower part of the bikini to come up high enough to cover the navel. From the 1960s on, the bikini shrank in all directions until it sometimes covered little more than the nipples and genitalia, although less revealing models giving more support to the breasts remained popular.

In 1964, the monokini, also known as a "topless bikini" or "unikini"), was designed by Rudi Gernreich, consisting of only a brief, close-fitting bottom and two thin straps; it was the first women's topless swimsuit. Gernreich's revolutionary and controversial design included a bottom that "extended from the midriff to the upper thigh" and was "held up by shoestring laces that make a halter around the neck." Some credit Gernreich's design with initiating, or describe it as a symbol of, the sexual revolution.

Anne Cole, later the inventor of the tankini (see below), designed several swimsuits for the Cole of California and Anne Cole Swimwear brand, including the “Scandal Suit,” a one-piece swimsuit with mesh inserts that became the first swimsuit to break $1 million in sales in 1964.

Also in 1964, Babette March became the first Sports Illustrated Swimsuit Issue cover model. She was on the swimsuit issue cover of the January 20, 1964, issue.

In the 1980s the thong or "tanga" came out of Brazil, said to have been inspired by traditional garments of native tribes in the Amazon. However, the one-piece suit continued to be popular for its more modest approach.

Men's swimsuits developed roughly in parallel to women's during this period, with the shorts covering progressively less. Eventually racing-style "speedo" suits became popular—and not just for their speed advantages. Thong, g-string and bikini style suits are also worn. Typically these are more popular in more tropical regions; however, they may also be worn at public swimming pools and inland lakes. But in the 1990s, longer and baggier shorts became popular, with the hems often reaching to the knees. Often called boardshorts and swim trunks, these were often worn lower on the hips than regular shorts.

Anne Cole (1926–2017), the founder of the brand Anne Cole named after her, was the woman who invented the tankini in 1998.

=== 21st century ===
In the 2010s, swimsuit competitions began to disappear from pageants. Miss Teen USA dropped theirs in 2016 for athletic wear and the athleisure market, a higher-revenue year-round market compared to swimwear, which is a seasonal niche market. Miss America ended its swimsuit competition in 2018.

== Alternatives to swimsuits ==
Since the early twentieth century a naturist movement has developed in western countries that seeks to enjoy non-sexual nakedness when swimming and during other activities. Some women prefer to engage in water or sun activities with their torso uncovered. The practice is often described as "toplessness" or "topfreedom". In some places around the world, nude beaches have been set aside for people who choose to engage in beach activities in the nude.

As an alternative to a swimsuit, some people wear trousers, underpants, or a T-shirt either as a makeshift swimsuit or because they prefer regular clothes over swimsuits. Using a T-shirt can also provide extra protection against sunburn. This practice may be more accepted at beaches than at swimming pools, which tend not to permit the use of regular clothes as swimwear because regular clothes may become translucent due to being unlined.

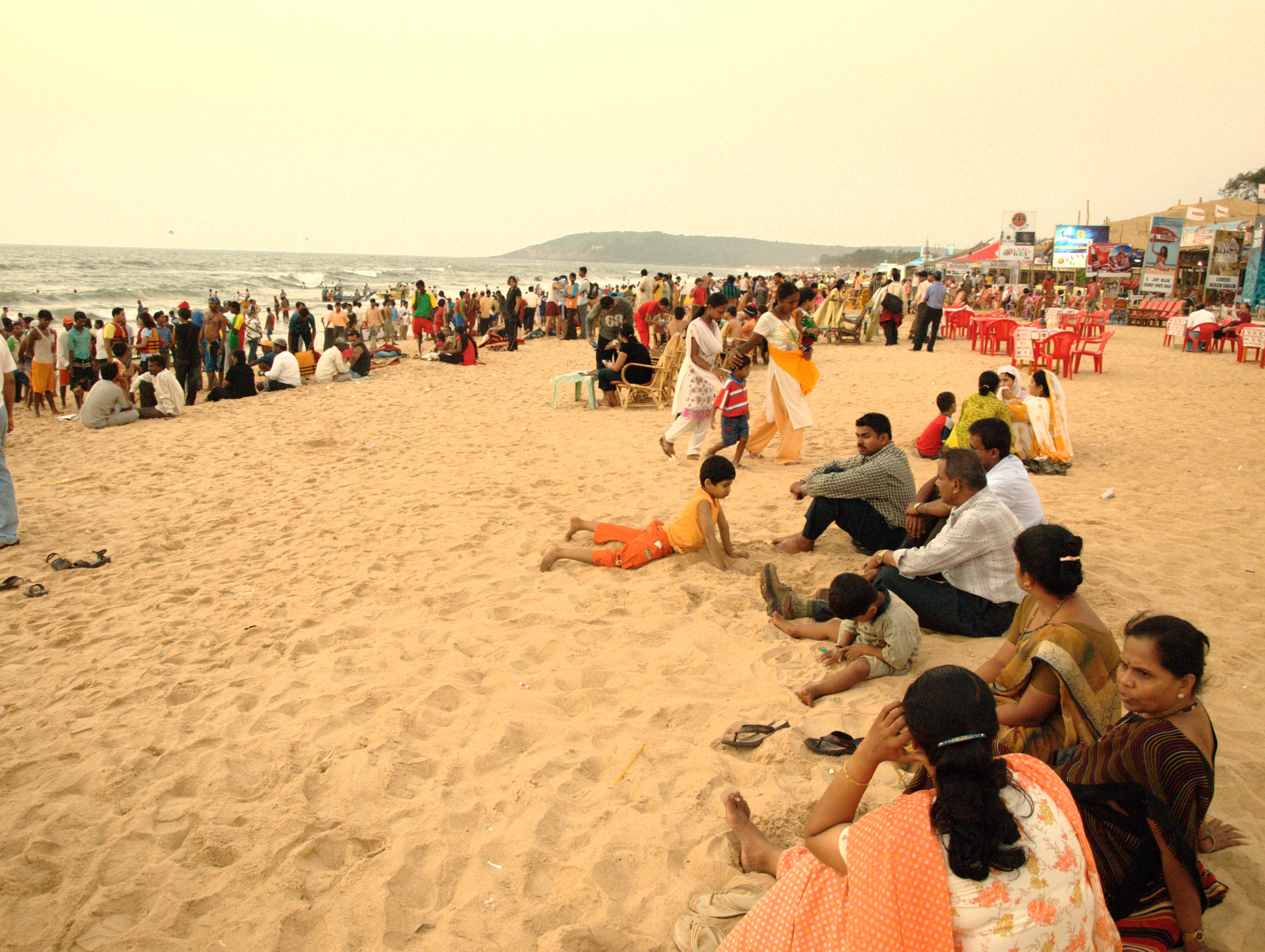
Calangute Beach, Goa, India

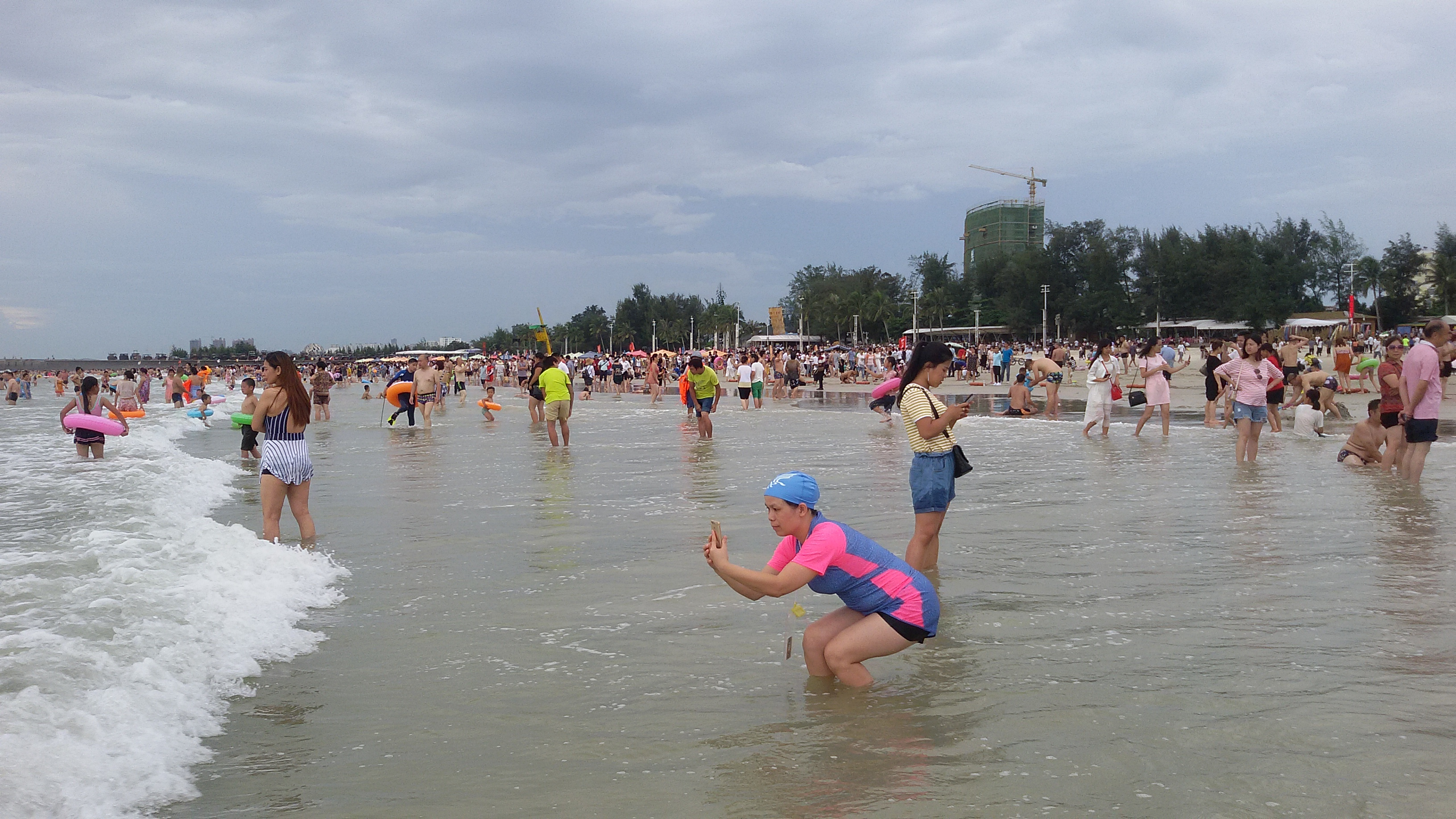
T-shirts, Silver Beach. Beihai, China

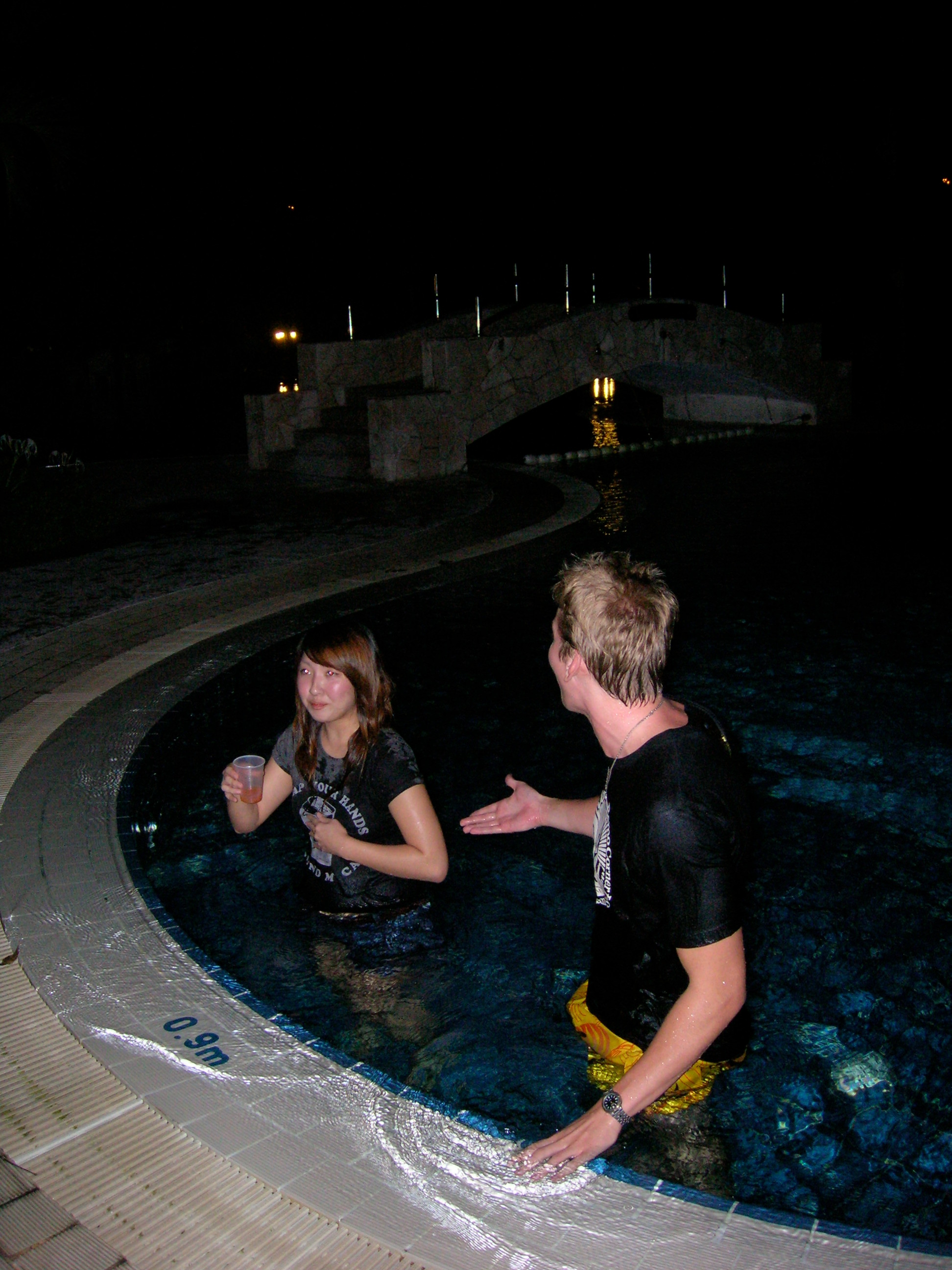
Wearing regular clothes in a swimming pool

== Swimsuit outside the water ==
Swimsuits can also be worn outside the water, for example as a fashion item, for sports, or while sunbathing.

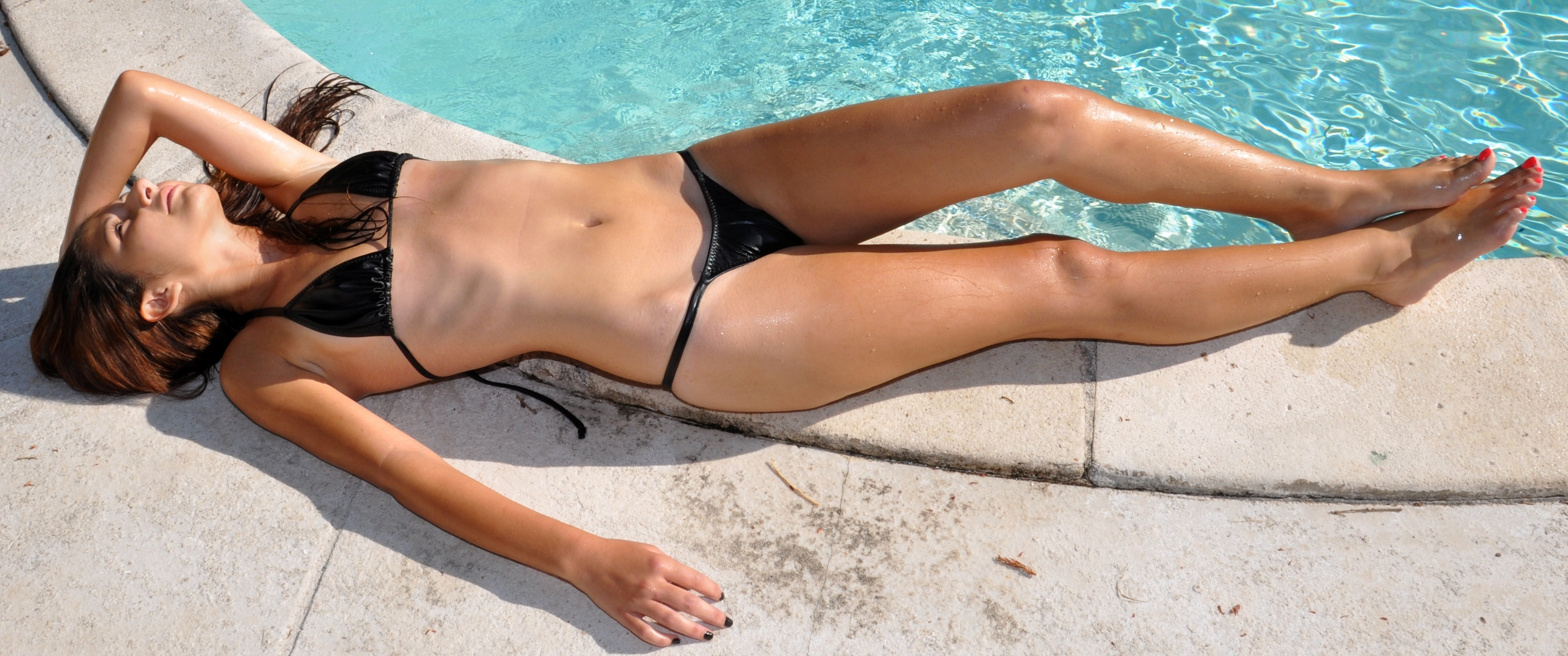
A woman sunbathing in a bikini near the pool

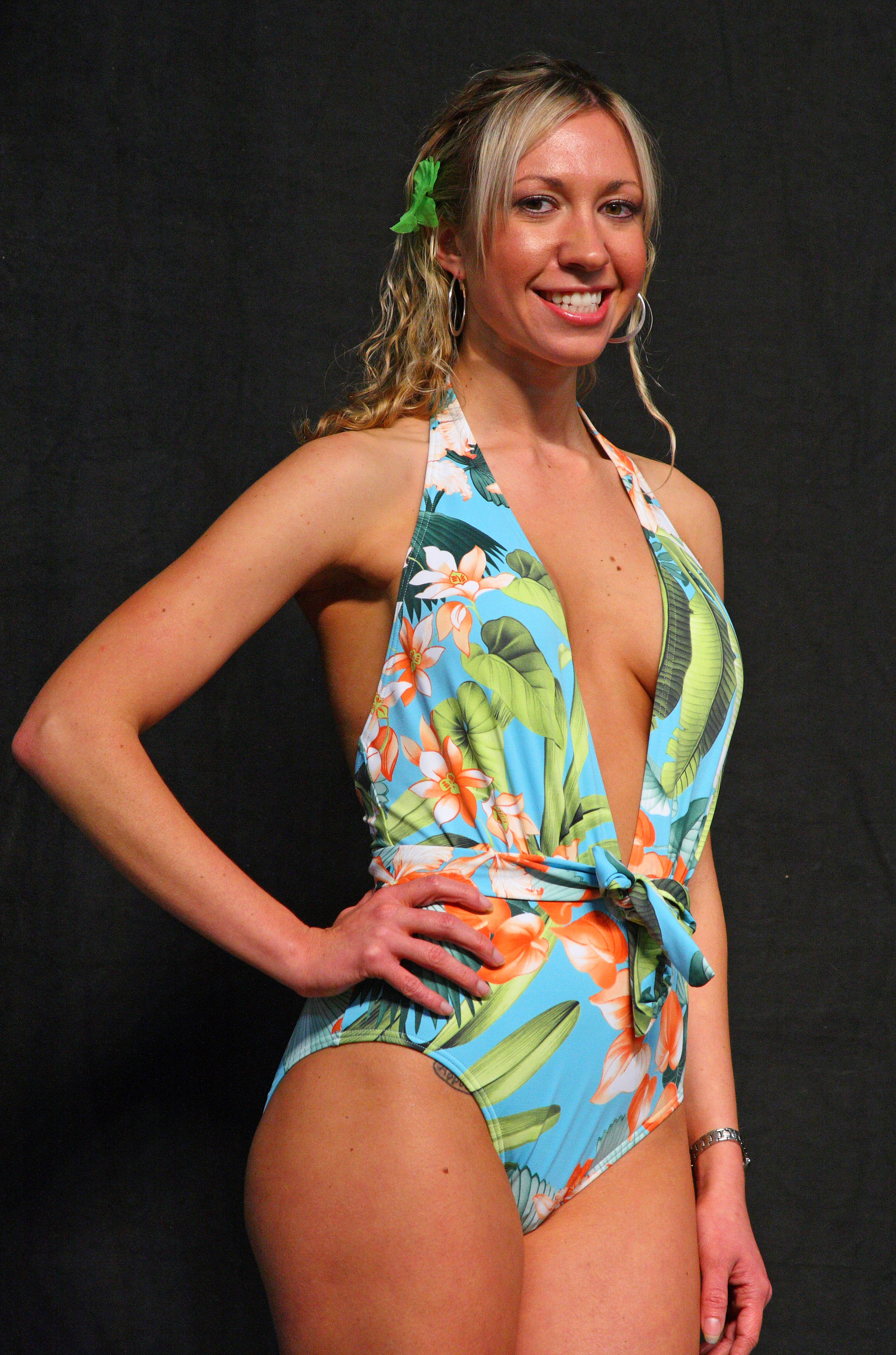
A woman modelling a one-piece swimsuit

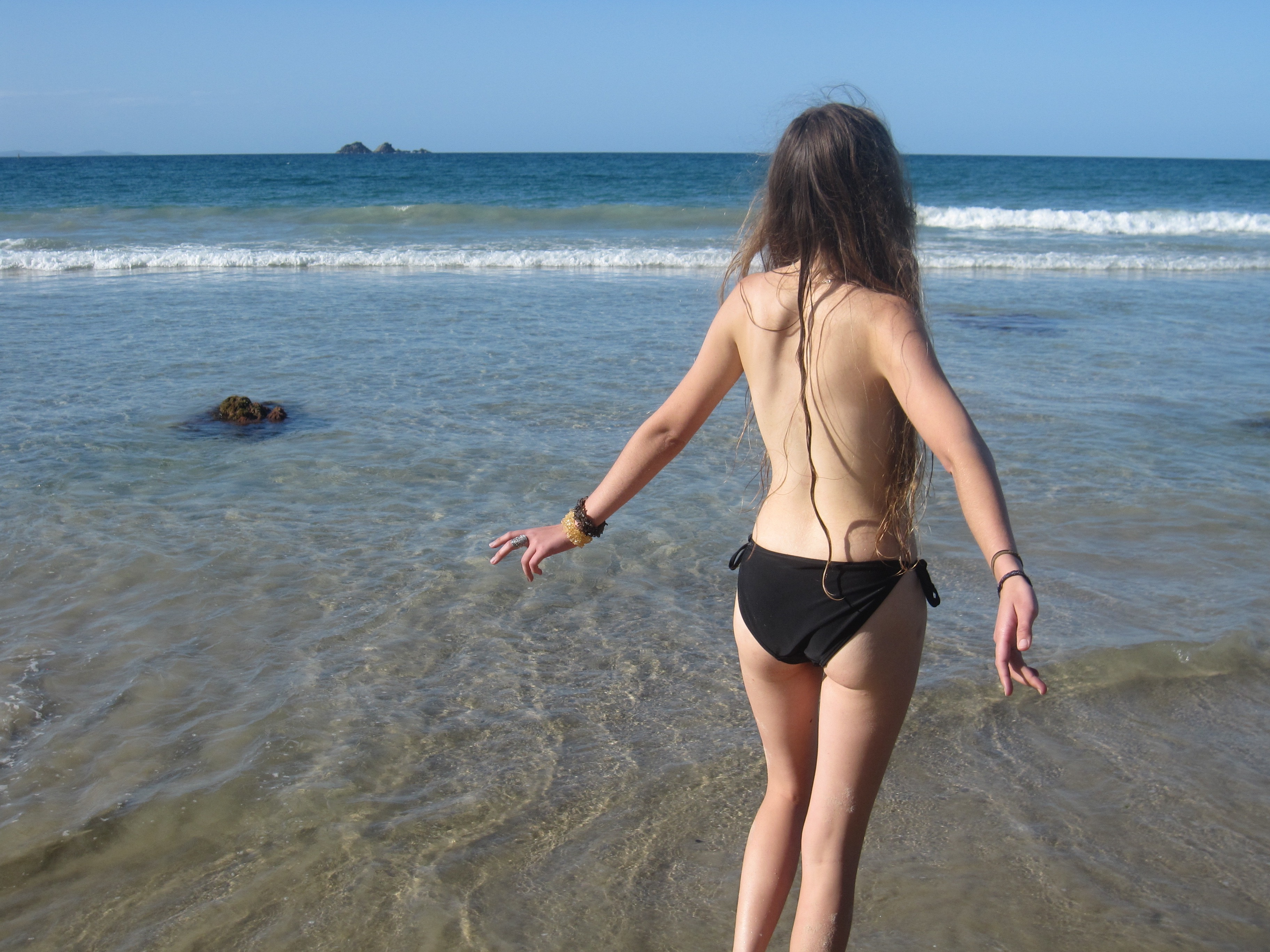
A woman frolicking at the beach in a bikini bottom

== See also ==
- 1907 Sydney bathing costume protests
- Bikini in popular culture
- List of swimwear brands
