= 1907 Sydney bathing costume protests =

Swimsuit protests in Sydney, Australia

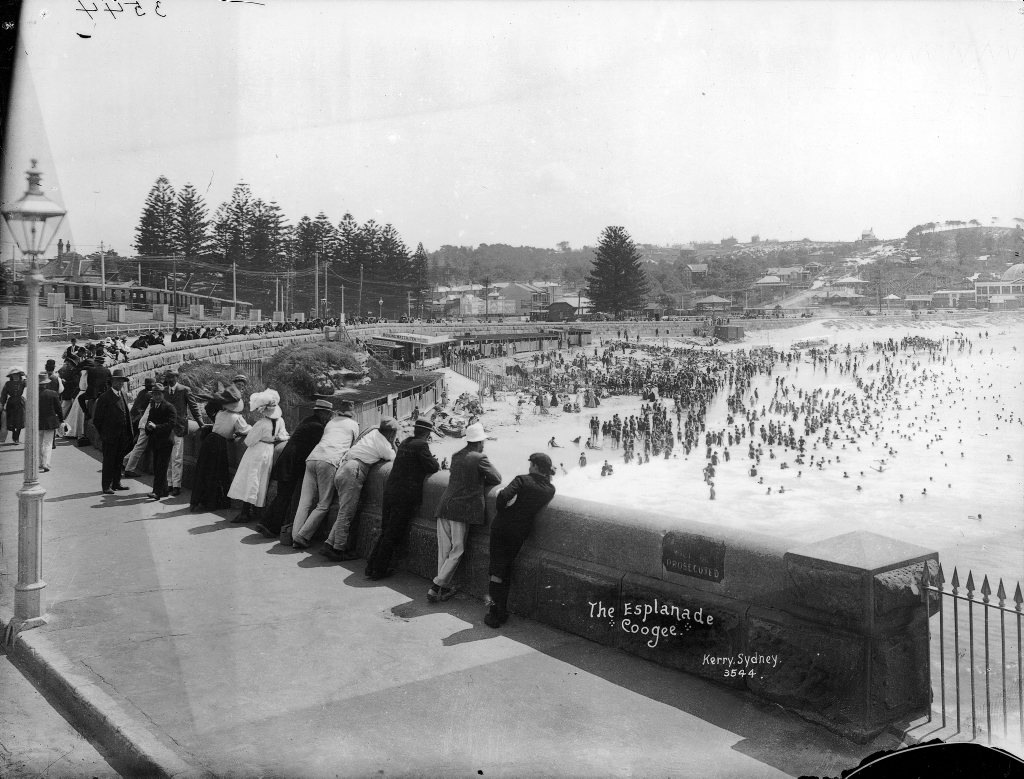
- The Esplanade, Coogee ca. 1900 by Charles Kerry & Co.
- Date: 20 October 1907
- Location: Beaches in Sydney, New South Wales
- Goals: Stop the passing of ordinance requiring males to wear skirt-like tunic when swimming
- Result: Proposal dropped

The 1907 Sydney bathing costume protests were a response to a proposed ordinance by the Waverley Shire Council to require the wearing of a skirt-like tunic by male bathers. On the morning of Sunday 20 October, thousands of surf bathing enthusiasts poured onto the sands of Bondi, Manly, and Coogee beaches in various types of feminine dress enacting a humorous mockery of the proposed regulations.

The protest at Bondi was reportedly the largest of the three, with a "swarm of humanity" participating in and observing the protests. The positivity with which the protests were regarded by both the general public and the media proved the end for the Waverley council's costume proposal; the tunic/skirt ordinance was not included in the beach ordinances promulgated in the following months.

This protest was separate from the 1935 NSW state ordinance relating to the Spooner bathing costume mostly directed at male wearers as bathing trunks were considered 'disgraceful'.

== Proposed costume ==
As beachgoing, and especially swimming in the ocean, became more popular at the end of the Victorian era, there arose a question as to proper dress for participants. While some concessions had to be made to allow for movement, the abbreviated clothing brought out a backlash by those offended by such "exhibitionism". Numerous localities passed and enforced laws setting minimum standards for beach attire.

The Waverley Municipal Council decided that male surf bathers should be as well clothed in the surf as females. Their proposal was to require that a skirt reaching at least to the knees must be added and the arms concealed to near the elbows. The mayor of Waverley described the costume as: "A combination, consisting of a guernsey with trouser legs and reaching from near the elbow to the bend of the knee, together with a skirt not unsightly but simply attached to the garment and covering the figure below the hips to the knee." Loitering on the beach was also to be prohibited and all communication between bathers and the general public was forbidden. The penalties for a breach of the regulation were proposed to be from £1 to £20.

== Beach protest ==
The protests against the skirt proposal marked the first representative actions of the Surf Bathing Association of New South Wales, the precursor to Surf Life Saving Australia, formed only days before on 18 October. Members of the Association, outraged by what they saw as their impending emasculation at the hands of the new bathing costume laws, organised the protest in less than two days. The rushed preparations undoubtedly accounted for the dishevelled state of dress in which many of the "ladies" appeared on the day. The beach protests were described as having a "carnival atmosphere", especially at Bondi. In a procession from the northern end of Bondi Beach, men wearing their sisters' or grandmothers' underwear, ballet frills, curtains or tablecloths followed a banner upholding a dead seagull.

== Reactions ==
The Skirt Scare at Manly by "Crow's Nest"

In the land of Topsy-Turvy
The women are donning shirts
And the men in the sea-side places
Have taken to wearing skirts...

Sing hey, for the whiskered women
In trailing skirts encased
Sing ho, for the dainty fellows
And clasp them round the waist.

Opposition to the proposal has been described as "prompt, universal and absolute" and it was quickly dropped. The Sydney Morning Herald declared the regulations to be "an instance of the official mind run mad", arguing that if "both male and female bathers of all ages must be clad in a species of skirt [it] would be too ridiculous for comment were it not that many thousands of persons will immediately become the sufferers, some by the legal penalty, others by abandoning the surf, unless public opinion is enabled to express itself quickly and forcibly".

Councils beyond Sydney also found themselves referring to the skirt for men proposal as they deliberated on appropriate clothing for both sexes at the beach. One Councillor at Euroa, Victoria for example, suggested the enforcement of a proper costume, from neck to knee, but "did not go as far as the Bondi mayor in New South Wales, in advocating a short skirt in addition".

Both individuals and city councils took the opportunity in different forms of writing to laugh at themselves and the absurdities associated with regulating such matters. One person was moved to write a comic poem and councillors in Victoria, for example, bantered. It was pointed out that while "a regulation was in force dealing with the whole matter – hours, costume, etc., ... 'proper costume' varied so much that it was well nigh impossible to get a proper legal definition."

Councillor Cole said that he "had defended youngsters who had produced little trunks; but such small articles adorning the fine manly physique of a gentleman of Cr [Councillor] Eddy's Herculean proportions for instance would probably not be deemed at law to be adequate covering. They might, perhaps, emulate the Sydney example of requiring such cases to be met by the adoption of frilled skirts (laughter) – something of the neck and knee order might be more indecent than skirts."

== Context ==
People generally agreed with strict regulations about dress but the idea of men wearing women's clothing was "going altogether too far", especially as male bathers were considered the "most manly of men" and sea-bathing both pleasurable and healthy. The "skirt" ordinance and the consequent demonstrations culminated decades of protest from conservative beach goers who decried the 'exhibitionism' of scantily clad surf bathers. However, the demonstration against the proposal by three Sydney mayors to introduce skirted bathing costumes on Sydney's main beaches showed the resistance particularly of middle-class men who were members of the newly established Surf Bathers Association of New South Wales.

The spirit in which the protests were conducted contributed greatly to a general acceptance of surf bathing on Sydney's beaches. It was also indicative of changing attitudes toward body image and masculinity in a fledgling nation.

== See also ==
- Swimwear
