= Nike Vaporfly and Tokyo 2020 Olympics controversy =

Super shoes controversy in sports

In 2017, Nike released the Nike Zoom Vaporfly Elite shoe, which was advertised as "ultra-lightweight, soft and capable of providing up to 85-percent energy return." These "super shoes" became the focus of claims that they were a form of technology doping and that they provided athletes an unfair advantage.

== Background ==
On January 31, 2020, World Athletics, the governing body for professional track and field, issued new guidelines concerning shoes to be used in the upcoming Tokyo 2020 Olympics. These updated guidelines followed complaints concerning the apparent performance advantage of Nike Vaporfly running shoes since 2017-2018. The major changes of these guidelines state that the "sole must be no thicker than 40mm" and that "the shoe must not contain more than one rigid embedded plate or blade (of any material) that runs either the full length or only part of the length of the shoe. The plate may be in more than one part but those parts must be located sequentially in one plane (not stacked or in parallel) and must not overlap". The components of the shoes are not the only thing that had major changes; starting April 30, 2020, "any shoe must have been available for purchase by any athlete on the open retail market (online or in store) for a period of four months before it can be used in competition". These new guidelines suited Nike's Vaporfly shoes which were already publicly available; however, other companies were left to catch up. Competitors of Nike rushed to bring new running shoes to market in time to meet the new guidelines so their sponsored athletes had a chance to compete in the Tokyo 2020 Olympics and for these companies to show off their products in one of the most watched sporting events in the world. Brooks Sports, a competitor of Nike in running shoes, said in a public statement that they would generally "spend more time between prototype and bringing a shoe to market but the recent World Athletics ruling pushed us to reassess our go to market strategy" and other companies are in the same situation.

== Nike Vaporfly shoe ==
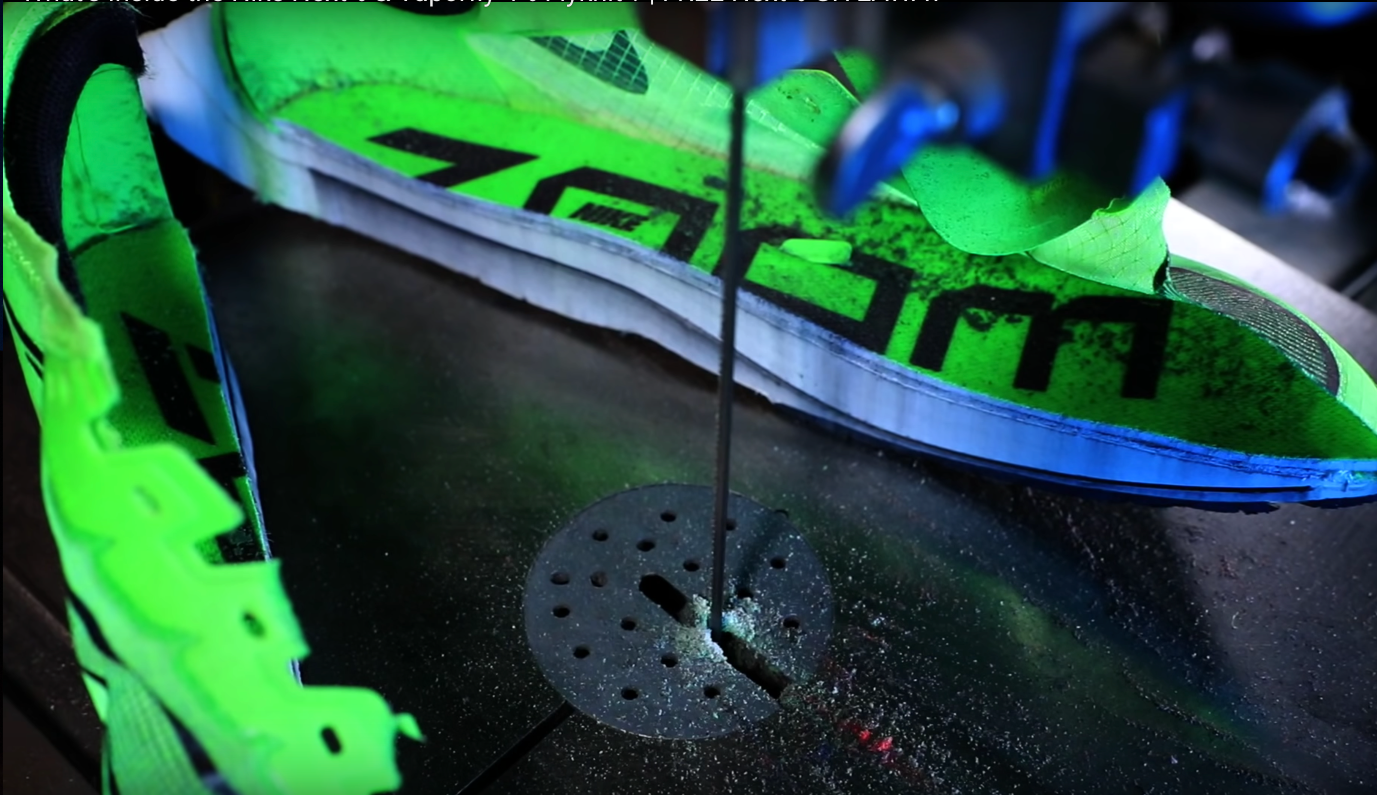
Nike Vaporfly cut in half to show the different layers that make up the base of the shoe. The dark grey line shows the carbon fiber plate.

The Nike Vaporfly first came out in 2017 and their popularity, along with its performance, prompted a new series of running shoes. The Vaporfly series has a new technological composition that has revolutionized long-distance running since studies have shown that these shoes can improve run times up to 4.2%. The shoe first emerged as the Vaporfly Elite and was worn by Kenyan athlete Eliud Kipchoge on May 6, 2017 during Breaking 2 - an attempt to break 2 hours in a marathon - on the Monza racing track in Italy. The shoe was then released to the general public as the Vaporfly 4%. In 2018, Nike released a second iteration called the Vaporfly 4% Flyknit. The following versions released in 2019 and 2021 are part of the Next% family. The composition of the sole contains a foamy material, Pebax, that Nike has altered and now calls it ZoomX. The ZoomX material can be found in other Nike products as well. Pebax foam can also be found in airplane insulation and is "squishier, bouncier, and lighter" than foams in typical running shoes. In the middle of the ZoomX foam there is a full-length carbon fiber plate "designed to generate extra spring in every step". In 2019 Nike released its newest product from the Vaporfly line, the Nike ZoomX Vaporfly NEXT%, which was marketed as "the fastest shoe we’ve ever made" using Nike's "two most innovative technologies, Nike ZoomX foam and VaporWeave material". For an extra push, Nike implemented a Nike Zoom Unit on the forefoot for less fatigue while running.

Since 2020, Nike has released four versions of the Vaporfly, most recently the Vaporfly 4. Each are designed to be slightly faster than the previous model with a lighter weight and cutting more from outsole rubber to increase the amount of ZoomX foam while staying under the 40mm height stack guidelines. It's this combination of the bouncy foam and the carbon fiber plate that result in the reduction in effort and increased speed.

== Claims of mechanical doping ==
World Athletics rules say "shoes, however, must not be constructed so as to give athletes any unfair assistance or advantage" but many critics argue that the Vaporflys do give an advantage, some even consider the Nike Vaporfly shoes as a form of technological or mechanical doping. According to Nike funded research, the shoes can improve efficiency by up to 4.2% and runners who have tested the shoe are saying that it causes reduced soreness in the legs. Expert sports technologist Bryce Dyer attributes this to the ZoomX and carbon fiber plate since it absorbs the energy and "springs runners forward". In an interview with the Wall Street Journal, Peter Thompson, a professional running coach and former World Athletics Official, believes that athletes would wear them because they give them an advantage without hurting them. He also argues that the same thing can be said for some doping practices, which is why he calls the Vaporfly shoes a "form of mechanical doping" and clearly wants the shoes to be banned from competition in order to "protect the integrity of the sport". Others are happy that there is some new room for innovation in the sport after almost half a century without any. Many athletes, scientists, and fans are comparing this situation to the LZR swimsuit controversy from 2008 where the swimsuits were regulated more as equipment, like a golf club or racecar or racket, instead of just clothing due to their technological advantages.

== Nike and World Athletics ==
Nike is considered to be the world's leading performance running shoe brand since the release of the Vaporfly. Looking at the fastest marathon times ever (at the time of writing) Nike-sponsored athletes using Vaporfly shoes have the top five spots while the number of major marathon winners sponsored by Adidas has halved, according to a Wall Street Journal analysis. This is similar to the LZR Racer swimsuit controversy from 2008: prior to new regulations being put in place, users of both products broke records while other competitors could not keep up.

Nike is a major sponsor of many of the world's track and field events at every level of competition. Nike sponsors a number of athletes, USA Track & Field, and has even sponsored the president of World Athletics, Sebastian Coe, since 1978.

Prior to the release of their new guidelines, World Athletics reviewed the Vaporfly and "concluded that there is independent research that indicates that the new technology incorporated in the soles of road and spiked shoes may provide a performance advantage" and that it recommends further research to "establish the true impact of the Vaporfly technology". They further stated that "shoe manufacturers will be invited to be part of this assessment process."

== See also ==
- LZR Racer
- Breaking2
