= High-technology swimwear =

Scientifically advanced materials used for swimwear

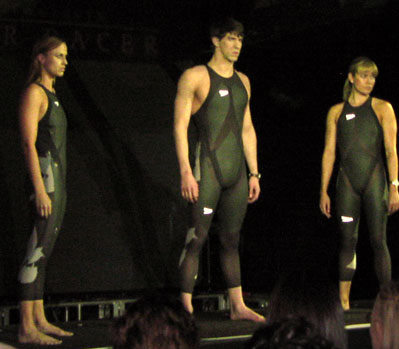
The LZR Racer, unveiled by Speedo in February 2008, was the first high-technology swimsuit to be released.

High-technology swimwear, or tech suits, are scientifically advanced materials used for swimwear in competitive water sports such as swimming and triathlon. Materials of this type are normally spandex and nylon composite fabrics with features to reduce drag against the water. The fabrics include features that increase the swimmer's glide through water and reduce the absorption of water by the suit as opposed to regular swimsuits. Additionally, the suits are extremely tight, which make the swimmers body more streamlined and help reduce the buildup of lactic acid in the body. Since 2010, high-tech swimsuits, specifically those offering significant performance-enhancing features and made from non-textile materials, have been banned in competitive swimming. This decision was made by FINA after the 2008 and 2009 swimming seasons, during which many world records were broken by swimmers wearing high-tech swimsuits, raising concerns about the impact of technology on the sport.

== Purpose and design ==
High-technology swimwear is designed to reduce drag and improve swimming performance. Speedo claims that their LZR Racer reduced drag or water resistance by 38% compared to a traditional Lycra practice swim suit. This high-technology swimwear is designed to minimize drag while maximizing support to muscles. Some companies claim that their fabrics reduce drag even more than the water's normal friction against the skin. To do this, they design high-end lines of competitive swimwear that cover the arms and legs. The fabric used for high-technology swimwear is light and water-repellent. The material is often composed of highly stretchy spandex and nylon. High-technology swimwear is often made using bonded seams, to reduce further drag. These suits also provide the compression necessary to increase performance.

== Manufacturers ==
High-tech fabric lines by swimwear manufacturers:

- A3 Performance – Stealth, Legend, and VICI
- Speedo – Aquablade, Fastskin, Fastskin 3, LZR Racer, LZR Elite, and LZR X
- Nike – LiftSuit and NG-1
- Arena – Powerskin ST, Powerskin XP and Powerskin R-EVO, Arena X-Glide, Carbon Ultra, and Powerskin Primo.
- Adidas – JetConcept, Hydrofoil, and Adizero
- TYR – Venzo, Avictor, Fusion, Aquapel, Aquashift, Tracer, AP12, and Avictor
- Zone Swimwear
- Dolfin – Titanium, LightStrike
- blueseventy – NeroTX and neroFIT
- MP Michael Phelps - Xpresso
- Mizuno – GX Sonic
- Finis - Vapor, Rival

== 2008–2009 ==
Speedo released the LZR Racer in February 2008. Within 6 weeks, 13 world records had been broken by swimmers using the suit. Athletes soon made efforts to acquire the suits, regardless of what their sponsorship was. At the 2008 Olympics, athletes using the LZR Racer set 23 world records (out of a total 25 swimming world records set in the competition), won 94% of gold medals, and won 89% of all medals in swimming.

By 2009, rival brands had created similar suits, such as the Arena X-Glide and Jaked 01, which consisted entirely of Polyuerethane (PU), and thus provided a greater competitive advantage than the Speedo LZR. Speedo did not release a new suit. Consequently, many swimmers abandoned the LZR Racer.

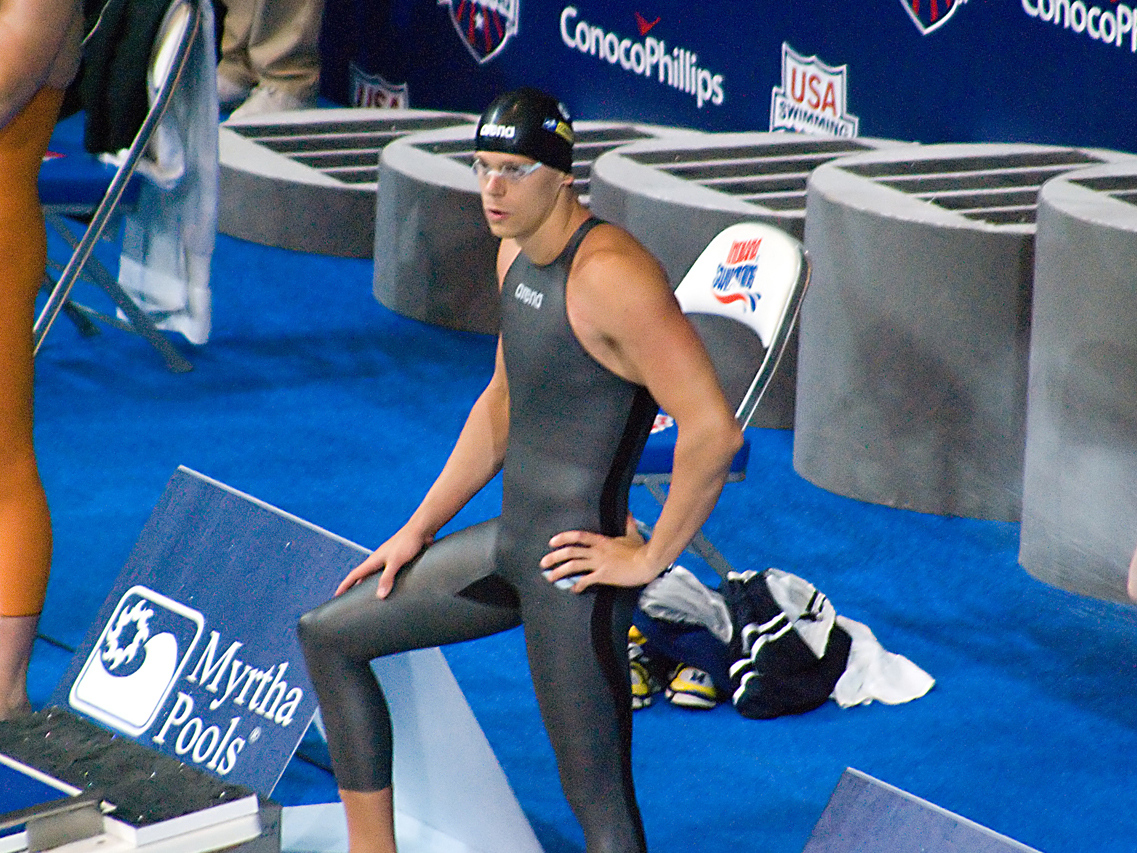
Brazilian swimmer César Cielo wearing the Arena X-Glide swimsuit

Initially, world records set in the Arena X-Glide were not ratified, as FINA had not approved the use of the suit. This included a 46.94 swim by France's Alain Bernard in the 100 m freestyle, which was 0.09 faster than the ratified world record. Arena amended the design to include non-PU materials, and was later approved by FINA.

The FINA Congress convened in Rome on 24 July 2009, during the World Championships. At this point, 130 world records had been set by swimmers using the suits. Its members voted almost unanimously to ban all body-length swimsuits. Men's swimsuits may maximally cover the area from the waist to the knee, and women's counterparts from the shoulder to the knee. They also ruled that the fabric used must be a "textile", that is, consisting natural or synthetic yarns woven together. With the exception of drawstrings on male jammers, suits must not have any fastening devices such as a zipper. The new regulations took effect on 1 January 2010.

Since the 2009 World Championships took pace before the ban took effect, an additional 42 world records were broken by swimmers using the suits. World Champion American swimmer Aaron Peirsol, who swam two world record times at the 2009 World Championships, said, "A lot of us are joking that this might be the fastest we ever go, we might as well enjoy this (2009) year."

While FINA's decision took effect on 1 January 2010, USA Swimming implemented the policy on 1 October 2009, the first day of its competitive season, to ensure consistency in the rules throughout the season. Although this did not prohibit American swimmers from wearing the suits in international competition for the remainder of the year, no such performances, including those ratified as world records by FINA, were ratified as American records.

== Cost ==
The materials are sometimes very expensive (USD$300–$600 or GBP£300-£500 for a full suit), limiting their use to highly competitive and professional levels of the sport. Additionally, women's suits are typically much more expensive than men's suits. However, in recent years with the advance of technology the most basic "high-technology swimwear" can be purchased for approximately $100 or £100.

In September 2020, USA Swimming banned 'tech suits' (another name for high tech swimsuits) for any USA Swimming member 12 years or younger competing at any USA Swimming sanctioned, observed, or approved meet, with the exception of Junior Nationals, US Open, National Championships, and Olympic Trials swim meets. Girls must typically wear a one-piece swimsuit that does not extend below the crotch. These regulations were enacted for multiple reasons, though the main reasons were to lower the cost of participation for young swimmers, and to make sure swimmers were focused on swimming, instead of buying suits.
