= Super shoes =

Type of athletic shoes

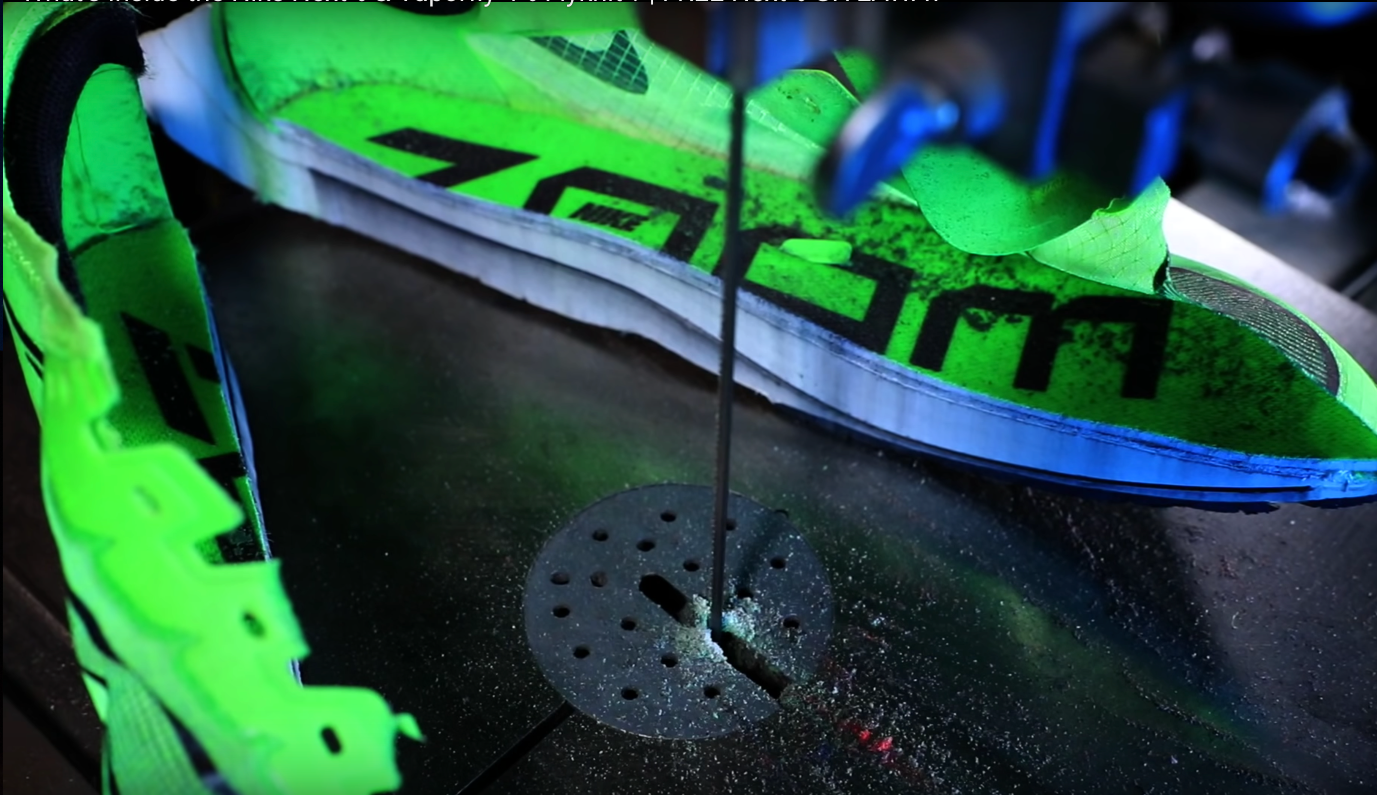
One of the first models of the Nike ZoomX Vaporfly NEXT%, cut in half to show the different layers of the shoe. The foamy material (Pebax) that Nike refers to as ZoomX and the dark grey full-length carbon fiber plate can be seen.

Super shoes, also known as carbon-plated shoes, are a type of lightweight running shoes incorporating carbon fiber plates and thick foam soles. They are typically used in long-distance runs, including trail running and marathons. Since their introduction on the road in 2016, and more recently on the track in 2019, super shoes have coincided with a series of record-breaking times in middle to long-distance events.

== History ==
The first shoes to incorporate carbon fiber plates were produced in 2016 by Nike. At the 2016 Summer Olympics in Rio de Janeiro, the top three finishers in the men's marathon all wore Nike Vaporfly 4% shoes. These so-called "super shoes" began retailing in 2017. Other major brands soon followed suit, producing their own versions of super shoes.

The introduction of super shoes coincided with a series of record-breaking times in long-distance running events. As of late 2023, 15 of the 20 top times for the marathon were set since 2018. Kenyan long-distance runner Eliud Kipchoge wore the Nike Air Zoom Alphafly NEXT%, shoes classified as super shoes, when he completed the world's first sub-2-hour marathon exhibition during the INEOS 159 challenge in 2019, although this event was not sanctioned by World Athletics. During the 2020 Summer Olympics held in 2021 in Tokyo, Nike's Vaporfly shoes proved controversial, leading to accusations of technology doping and changes in guidelines by World Athletics, the international governing body for running sports. At the 2021 British Athletics Marathon and 20 km Walk Trial, winner Chris Thompson wore Nike Vaporfly Next% shoes. During the 2022 New York City Marathon, Sharon Lokedi won the women's marathon wearing Under Armour Velociti Elite carbon-plated shoes. At the 2023 Chicago Marathon, both the women's and men's races were won by runners wearing prototypes of the Nike Alphafly Next% 3 shoe. Kelvin Kiptum set a world record of 2:00:35 in that race. In 2023, Ethiopian long-distance runner Tigst Assefa set a world record for the women's marathon of 2:11:53 while wearing super shoes. Beatrice Chebet's time of 28:54.14 in May 2024 for the 10,000 meters was also made in super shoes. In April 2026, the first sub-2-hour marathon race sanctioned by World Athletics was completed by Sabastian Sawe and Yomif Kejelcha in Adidas Adios Pro Evo 3 super shoes.

The impact of super shoes on race completion times has led commentators to suggest that record books should distinguish between the records created before and after their introduction. Runners such as Tim Hutchings have suggested that super shoes have diluted the currency of world records, which should be considered in their historical contexts.

== Characteristics ==
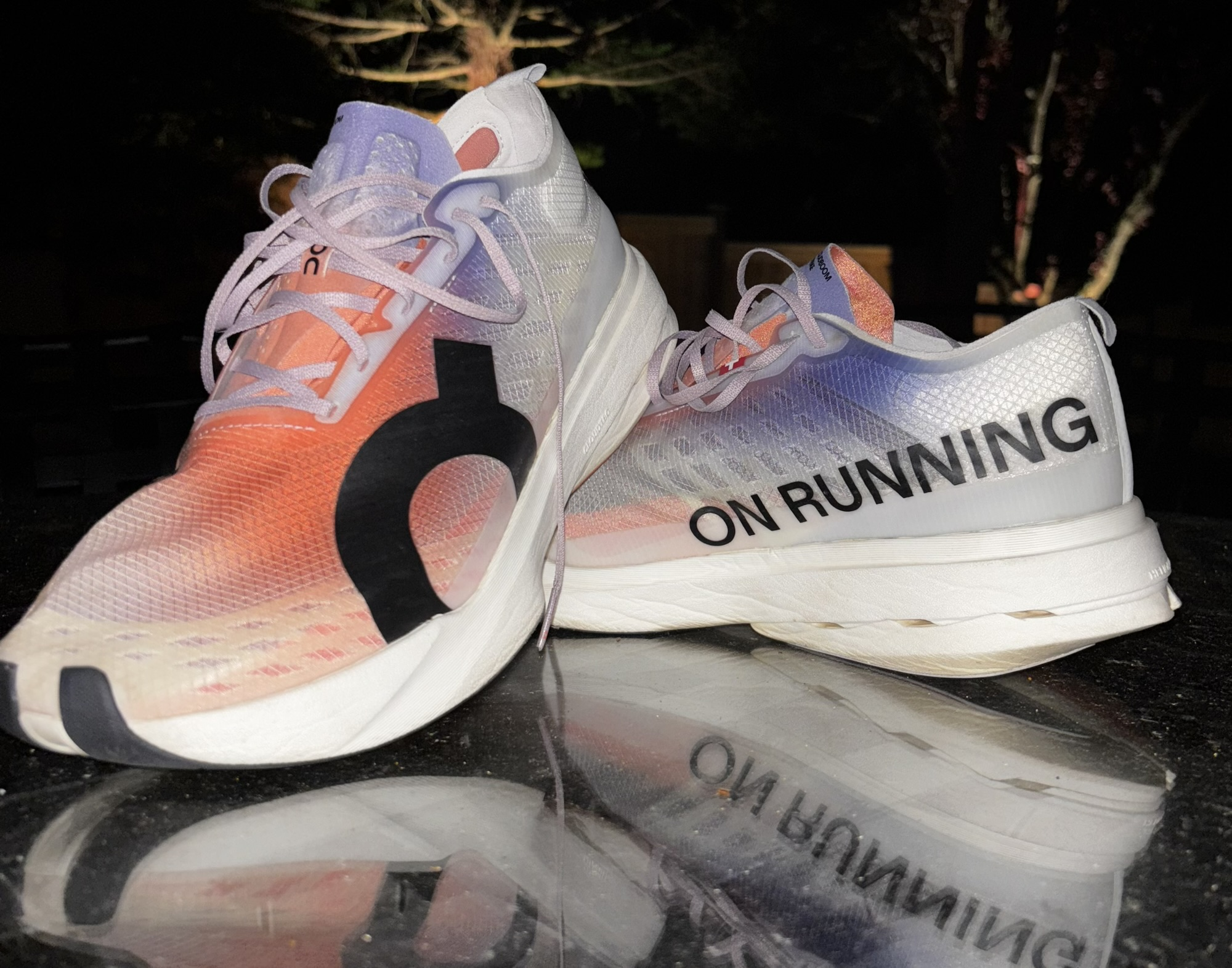
On Cloudboom strike

Super shoes differ from other athletic shoes in that they are very lightweight, have a full-length carbon fiber plate beneath the footbed, and thick, resilient foam soles. The architecture or geometry of super shoes may also be distinct, for example including a rocker that enables a specific transition point. Some super shoes incorporate carbon fiber rods instead of plates. The uppers of the shoes tend to be minimalistic and thin. World Athletics set guidelines limiting soles of shoes used in competitions to 40 mm (1.6 in) in stack height.

Super shoes are more expensive than other running shoes, ranging from $200 to $500 for a pair. Prices in late 2023 for Nike Vaporfly and Alphafly shoes ranged from $260 to $285. Some super shoes are designed to be worn during only a single marathon race after a minimal breaking-in time and have drawn criticism for their environmental impact.

Shoes with carbon fiber plates have been shown to affect running economy. A 2021 paper examined the impact of super shoes on the performance of runners. Other than improvements in the running economy of an athlete carbon plated shoes also impact the mechanics of the runner. The responsive foam and carbon plate work together to take some of the load off of the athletes ankle and calf. This decreases fatigue and allows for runners to maintain a faster pace for longer with less strain on the lower leg.

== Context ==
Performance increases also translate into a better running economy for the general public. A New York Times study examining race results after the 2017 release of Nike’s Vaporfly 4% showed similar performance increases to the elite field. When compared to past years, the Strava study found people were likely to get a personal record and often had more to give in marathon performances while wearing carbon-plated super shoes. The benefits felt by the public added to the popularity of the carbon-plated running shoe, which made them particularly hard to find in the year of their introduction in 2017. The popularity of the advanced shoe design has continued into the present, with notable shoes being the Nike Vaporfly, Nike Alphafly and the recent On Cloudboom Strike LS featuring ON’s Lightspray upper.

The increasing popularity and results garnered by super shoes have allowed companies to push technological boundaries and athletes to continue pushing limits. Companies such as Puma have made banned super shoes that disregard World Athletics regulations, thereby making them illegal to use in competition. The Puma Fast-RB (rule-breaking) earns its name and shows what companies are capable of without restriction.

The legality of super shoes is also a current issue within World Athletics, the international governing body for Track and Field. World Athletics has set strict rules and regulations for competition spikes/shoes worn in international races; this is to maintain the integrity of the sport while also allowing athletes to use some of the newest technology. These regulations include a maximum stack height of 40 millimeters as well as a prohibition on shoes with more than one embedded plate or blade. These regulations eliminate some of the fastest shoes currently on the market in international competition. The reason for these types of shoes to be banned from World Athletics events is to keep competitions fair for all athletes.

Within regulations, companies have still made technological advances, with athletes finding results in the elite field and amongst amateur athletes. Running companies have delivered super shoes that have proven to make an athlete faster. These gains are still called into question, and the use of "technological doping" is an ongoing debate.

== See also ==
- Nike Vaporfly and Tokyo 2020 Olympics controversy
