= Aquashift =

Swimsuit

Aquashift (or Aqua Shift) is a high-end technical swimsuit made by American swimwear company TYR which was released in early 2004. It incorporates years of research that TYR performed with the Center for Research and Education in Special Environments (CRESE), at the University at Buffalo. The suit sports the "Tripwire", a feature unique to TYR and the Aquashift suit, that reportedly reduces drag by a very large percentage. The suits are made of a blend of 74% polyester and 26% Lycra. The line of suits offers a bodyskin (minus arms) for both men and women, a kneeskin for men and women, and a regular women's suit. The price range for these suits is roughly $120 for a pair of jammers to about $380 for a bodyskin.

== Tripwires ==
The tripwires or "turbulators" are placed at several spots along the length of the suit including the chest, where a set of four tripwires runs across the whole chest, the buttocks (where a single tripwire is placed), the shoulders, and, if a swimmer has an Aquashift swim cap, there is a trip wire on his or her head. Normally water hits the head and shoulders and immediately breaks, creating turbulence. However, with the addition of the tripwire, the water is forced to keep its flow consistent along the entire surface of the swimmer. The water flow is disrupted strategically so that it will break and reassemble, thereby keeping the flow stable across the entire body. The tripwires are made to be exactly congruent in height around the entire body, in an attempt to make them as effective as possible at disrupting the water flow. A patent is currently pending on the tripwires used in this suit. The suit was the co-invention of University at Buffalo professors Dr. David Pendergast, Dr. Joe Mollendorf, and Head Swimming Coach Budd Termin. The subjects for the study consisted of the men's and women's swimming team members at the University at Buffalo.

== Science behind the suit ==
The research for the TYR Aquashift was done by the University at Buffalo, where it was supervised by senior professors of physiology and biomechanical engineering. TYR worked with CRESE to design a highly effective hydrodynamic suit.

Wave drag is one of the forms of drag created by swimmers, the others being pressure drag and friction drag. Wave drag is created by every movement a swimmer makes in the water. The more wave drag is created, the more energy a swimmer must put out to make progress through the water. Therefore, anything that reduces wave drag will theoretically make it easier for a swimmer to swim faster. The Aquashift suit is claimed to reduce wave drag by as much as 53%, according to the research done by TYR. Their research also claims that the suit reduces drag overall by as much as 10% and pressure drag by 18%.

== Performances ==
The TYR Aquashift suit is worn by all of TYR's sponsored athletes, including Ukrainian Yana Klochkova, Americans Erik Vendt, Peter Verhoef, and Bryce Hunt, and Slovakian Martina Moravcova. The Aquashift was the suit in which American record holder Erik Vendt set the new American record in the 1500m freestyle in 2008.
