= Square cut =

Square cut may refer to:

- A form of competitive swimwear
- A type of cut (cricket), a batting stroke in the game of cricket
- A form of hair cut
