= Arena X-Glide =

Swimsuit brand

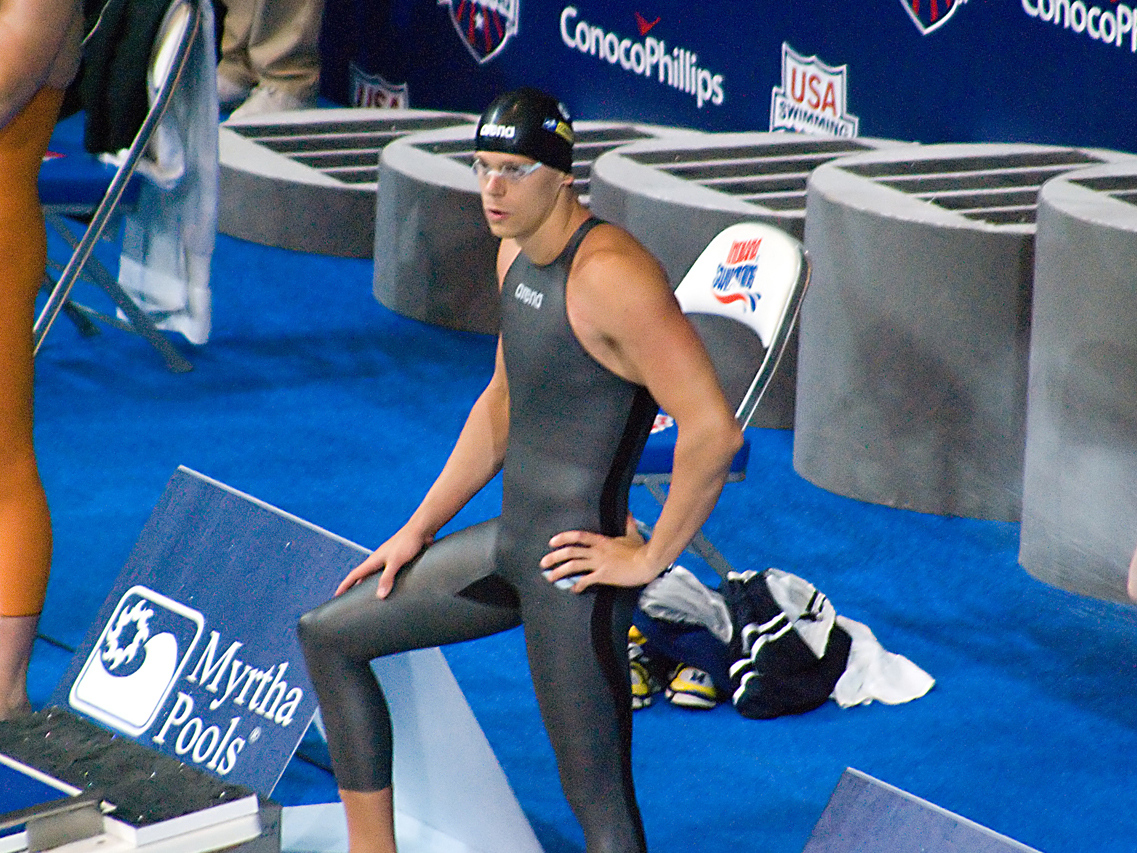
Brazilian swimmer César Cielo wearing the Arena X-Glide swimsuit

Arena X-Glide is a swimsuit from the Arena brand, made of pure polyurethane that causes a swimmer to slide through water faster when swimming. One notable example of the efficacy of this suit design is that of Paul Biedermann of Germany who wore the suit in the 2009 World Championships, breaking two world records. The design of the suit covers basically the whole torso and the legs with the impermeable polyurethane, thereby exposing less skin to the water and improving the swimmer's buoyancy and streamlined shape. This significantly reduces the drag on the swimmer as they move through the water.

== Technology ==
According to Rick Sharp, an exercise physiologist at Iowa State University, "The Speedo team came up with a design that put panels of polyurethane over parts of the body that produce the highest drag. Another part is the suit design: You don't want a suit that traps water as it flows around the swimmer. Yet another innovation is to use material that squeezes and slims down swimmers "so the skin doesn't wobble around as they go through the water." Pieces of fabric were put through wind-tunnel tests to check for drag. Programmers used computational fluid dynamics to model the suits' aerodynamic qualities, as if they were trying to figure out how a brand-new jet will fly. Then, swimmers put the designs to real-world tests in tanks and pools.

Following the incredible results the new Speedo LZR Racer swimsuit produced in the Beijing Olympics (Twenty-three world records were broken by the swimmers who wore LZR Racer suits, compared with only two that were broken by the swimmers who didn't. Speedo said 89 percent of all the medals in swimming, including 94 percent of the gold medals were won by LZR Racer swimmers), Italian swimsuit makers Arena and Jaked responded by both developing suits that one-upped the Speedo by using pure polyurethane.

== Controversy ==
There was a great deal of controversy in the swimming world surrounding polyurethane swimsuits, and strict rules banning these types of swimsuits in professional swimming were put into place. After Biedermann's wins in the 2009 World Championships, Michael Phelps' trainer (until then, Phelps had held the world record for the 200m freestyle since 2007) suggested that Phelps boycott international swimming competitions until the suit is banned. Biedermann's breaking of both Ian Thorpe's 400m world record as well as Phelps's 200m record have been largely attributed to the superiority in the design of his swimsuit. Michael Phelps speculated that the new rules banning polyurethane will level the playing field once more, stating:

I will say that next year swimming will be swimming again. You're going to have to do all the work and there's not going to be a suit that does it for you.

== FINA rule changes ==
Following the December 2008 European Short Course Championships in Croatia, where 17 world records fell, it was felt there was a need to modify the rules surrounding swimsuits. The combined effects of the LZR both compressing the body and trapping air for buoyancy led to many competitors who used the LZR wearing two or more suits for an increased effect. This led to some claiming that the LZR was in effect "technological doping."

At their meeting in Dubai in March 2009, FINA stipulated that swimsuits should not cover the neck, must not extend past the shoulders and ankles, and also limit the suits' thickness and buoyancy. In a statement FINA stated that:

Fina wishes to recall the main and core principle that swimming is a sport essentially based on the physical performance of the athlete.

The LZR Racer and all other Speedo Fast Skin Competition Suits were approved. However other suits like the BlueSeventy Nero Comp were banned first and afterwards released, too.

In an abrupt reversal of opinion, the FINA Congress voted almost unanimously to revert its previous policy and ban all body-length swimsuits. The decision was taken in Rome on July 24, 2009, during the 2009 World Aquatics Championships. The new policy states that men's swimsuits may maximally cover the area from the waist to the knee, and women's counterparts from the shoulder to the knee. They also ruled that the fabric used must be a textile (i.e. woven rather than a foil). The new regulations took effect in January 2010.

USA Swimming, the United States governing body, made the date where all these suits will be illegal October 1, 2009.

FINA has already released an outline of the legal suits to wear. Among the suits on this list there is the Nike Swift, the Speedo FS PRO, and the Speedo LZR.

== See also ==
- LZR Racer
- 2008 Summer Olympics
- FINA
- 2009 World Aquatics Championships
