= Aquapel =

Technical racing swimsuit

Aquapel is a technical racing swimsuit designed by Tyr Sport, Inc. It is designed to improve the wearer's speed and reduce body drag while swimming. The suit fits snugly and uniformly across all parts of the body. The suit also sports strangely placed seams that together make-up what TYR calls hydrodynamic flow panels. These flow panels have been specially designed to reduce turbulence, and aid in the smooth control of water flow. In 2005, these suits ranged in price from roughly $55 for a racer to $220 for a bodyskin.

== Construction ==
Aquapel is constructed of a Lycra blend. It is passed through a series of rollers, which flatten the material while still maintaining its original strength and recovery ability. Then it is heated, which sears the material, giving it a shiny finish. A hydrophobic solution is the applied to the finished material to reduce the chlorine and water absorption of the fabric. These applications help the suit reduce drag and micro-turbulence, while advancing the hydrodynamic principles of the suit.

== Performance ==
The suits have been seen at the 2000 Olympics, but their popularity was far lower than that of their competition, the Speedo Fastskin. A 2007 study found that the Aquapel suits reduced drag and increased speed compared with "traditional" suits but did not compare them directly with competitors like Speedo.
