= One-piece swimsuit =

Swimwear worn mainly by women and girls

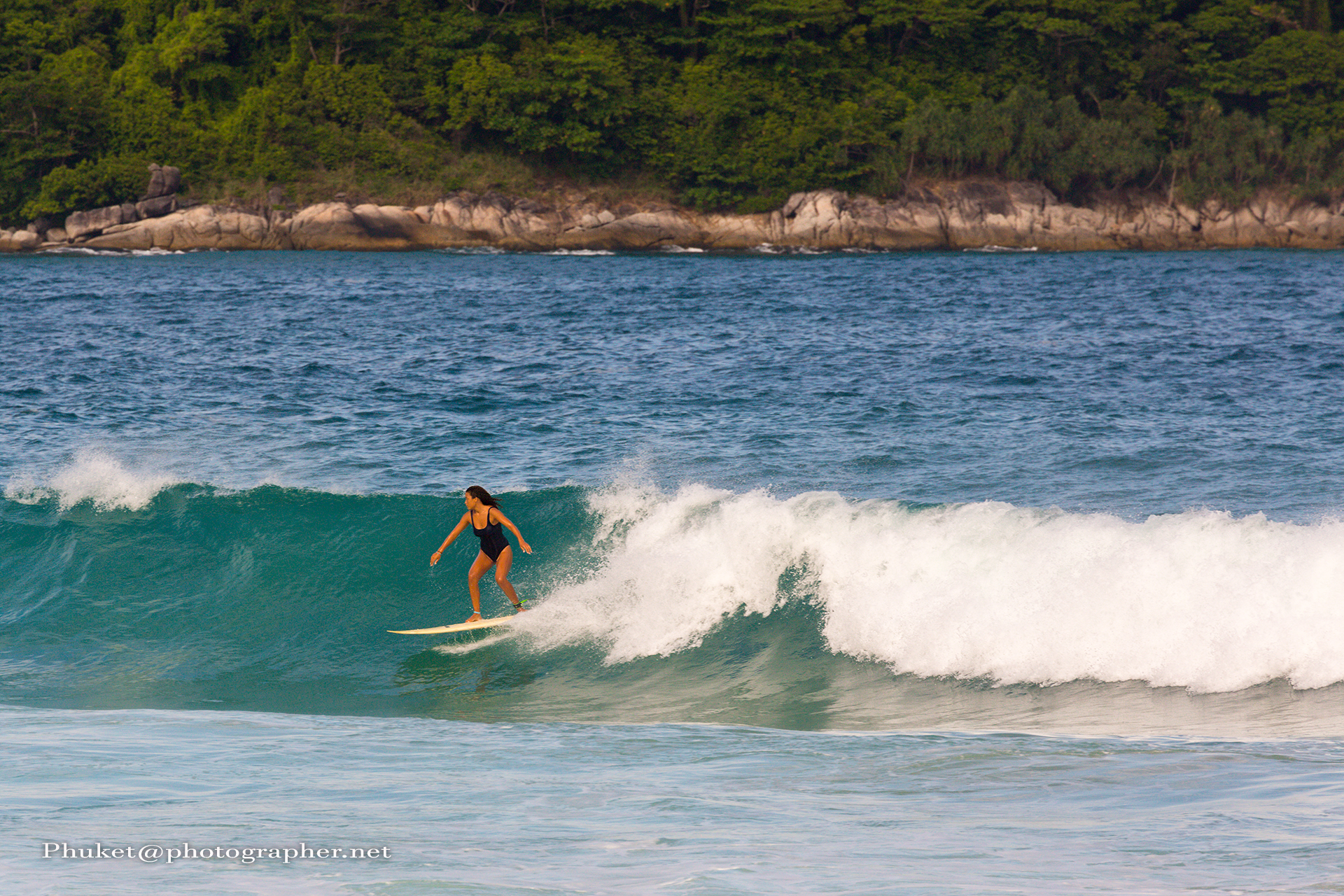
A woman surfing in a one-piece swimsuit

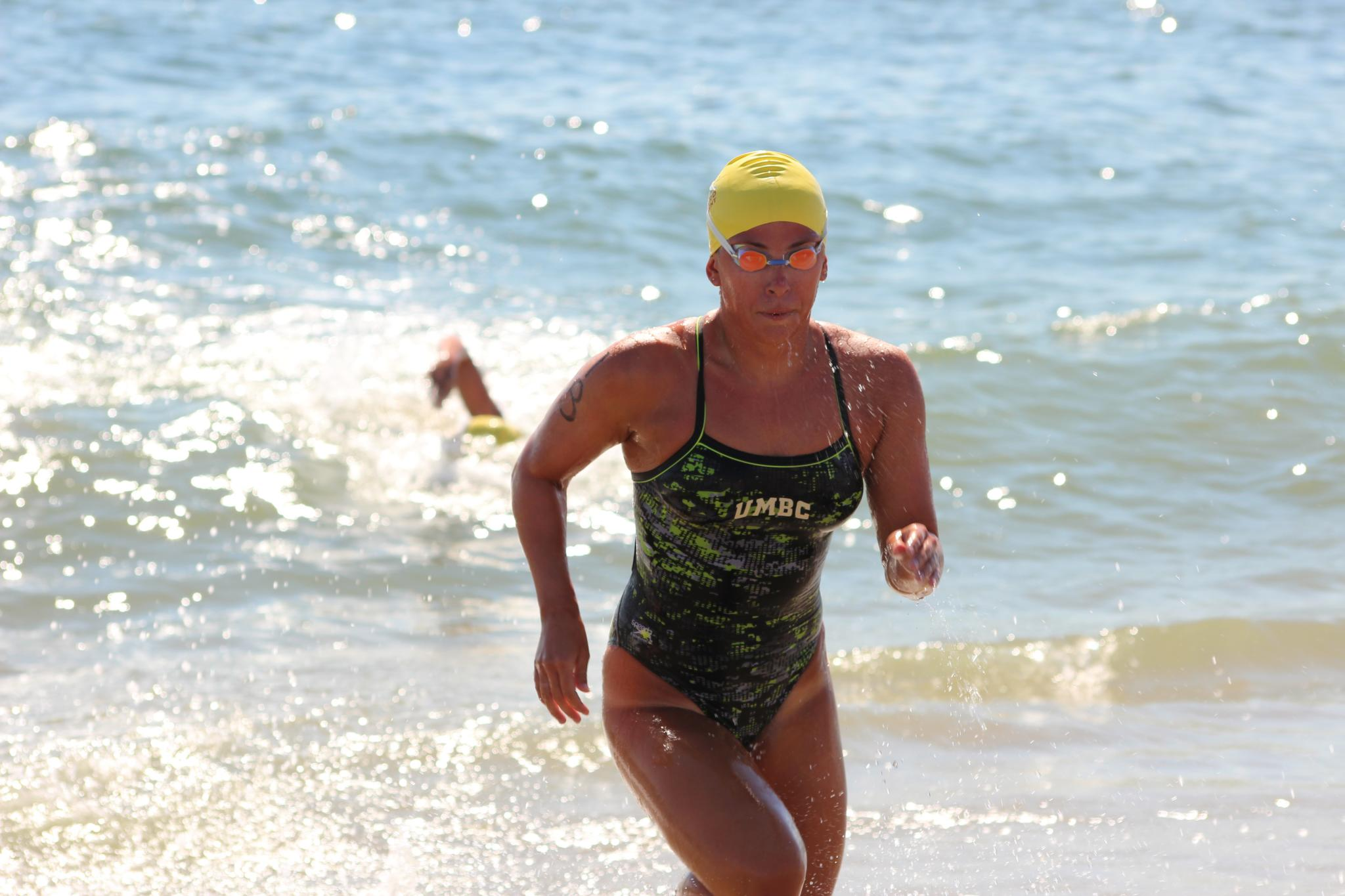
A lifeguard wearing a racing one-piece swimsuit at a tournament

A one-piece swimsuit most commonly refers to swimwear worn primarily by women and girls when swimming in the sea or in a swimming pool, playing water polo, or for any activity in the sun, such as sun bathing. Today, the one-piece swimsuit is usually a skin-tight garment that covers the torso, although some designs expose the back or upper chest.

Before the popularity of the two-piece swimsuit, and then the bikini, virtually all women's swimwear completely covered at least the wearer's torso, and men also wore similar swimsuits. While the bikini has increasingly found popular acceptance since the 1960s, the one-piece swimsuit has maintained a place on beaches to this day.

== Types and variations ==
The most common type of one-piece suit is the maillot (a term that is not generally used anymore) or tank suit, which resembles a sleeveless leotard or bodysuit. There are variants of the one-piece swimsuit, including halterneck styles and plunge front swimsuits, as well as wrap-round ("surplice") and bandeau styles. The pretzel suit is another style of the one-piece swimsuit. Recently, athletic swimsuits have used a variety of new shoulder strap styles, including the racerback, fastback, and flyback styles, some of which have also been used on other athletic wear. Another recent innovation in one-piece swimsuits is the bodyskin, which superficially resembles a unitard or wetsuit, covering the entire torso, arms, and legs. This serves to reduce friction through the water for professional swimmers. The surface is made of textured technical fabrics which are engineered to cut through the water in the same way as fish or sharkskin.

== History ==
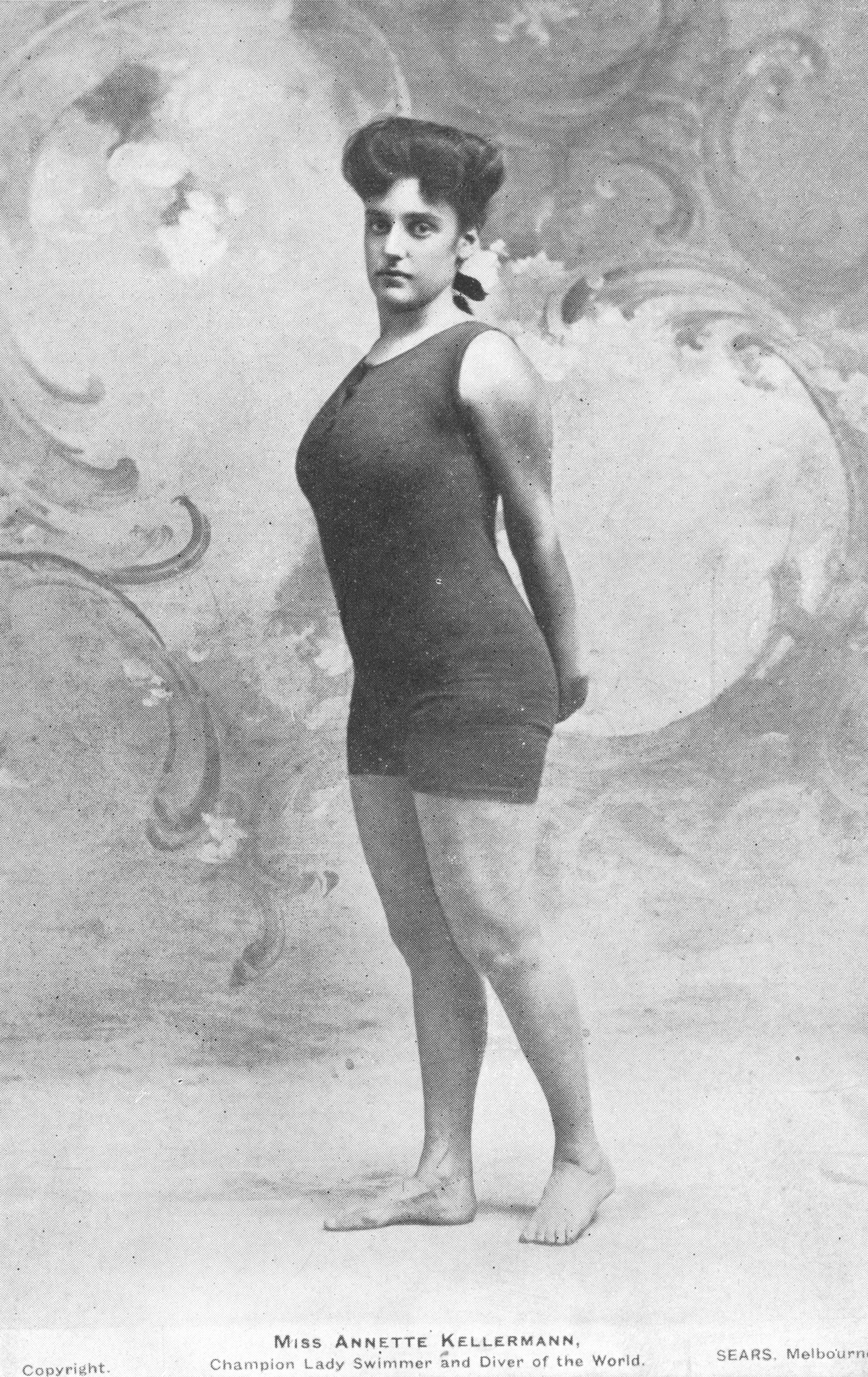
Annette Kellerman in the form-fitting one-piece tank suit

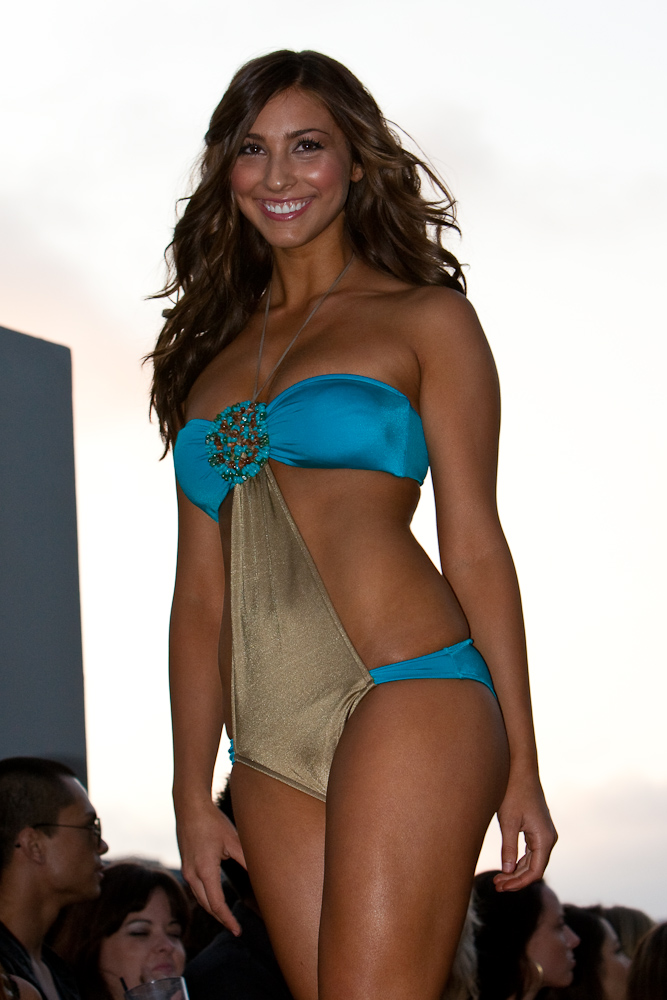
A modern one-piece swimwear with cut-outs

The modern one-piece swimsuit made its appearance in the mid-1900s, when the style was widely described as a maillot. Its widespread acceptance is attributed to Australian swimmer Annette Kellerman, who attracted further attention to the style when, in 1907, according to her, she was arrested on a Boston beach for indecent exposure because her swimsuit showed arms, legs and the neck, a costume she adopted from England, and which was similar to men's swimsuits of the time. Though the reality of the arrest was not corroborated by anyone but Kellermann, the arrest prompted a wide public outrage which added to the acceptance of the style. . Kellerman marketed these bathing suits and the style came to be known as "the Annette Kellerman". The one-piece swimsuit became accepted swimsuit attire for women in parts of Europe by 1910, and other places, and was the authorised attire for women's swimming at the 1912 Summer Olympics, the first at which women competed.

Harper's Bazaar praised the Kellerman swimsuit, writing in June 1920 (vol. 55, no. 6, p. 138): "Annette Kellerman Bathing Attire is distinguished by an incomparable, daring beauty of fit that always remains refined." The following year, in June 1921 (vol. 54, no. 2504, p. 101), it wrote that these bathing suits were "famous ... for their perfect fit and exquisite, plastic beauty of line". In the United States, beauty pageants of women in bathing costumes became popular from the 1880s. However, such events were not regarded as respectable. Beauty contests became more respectable with the first modern "Miss America" contest held in 1921, though less respectable beauty contests continued to be held. Nevertheless, the Annette Kellerman continued to be considered by some as the most offensive style of swimsuit in the 1920s and became the focus of censorship efforts. Even in 1943, pictures of the Kellerman swimsuit were produced as evidence of indecency in Esquire v. Walker, Postmaster General.

During the 1920s and 1930s, people began to shift from "taking in the water" to "taking in the sun", at bathhouses and spas, and swimsuit designs shifted from functional considerations to incorporate more decorative features. Rayon was used in the 1920s in the manufacture of tight-fitting swimsuits, but its durability, especially when wet, proved problematic, with jersey and silk also sometimes being used.

By the 1930s, the necklines of women's swimwear plunged at the back, sleeves disappeared, and sides were cut away and tightened. With the development of new clothing materials, particularly latex and nylon, through the 1930s, swimsuits gradually began hugging the body, with shoulder straps that could be lowered for tanning. Since the 1960s, the bikini has increasingly found popular acceptance, though the one-piece swimsuit has maintained a place on beaches to this day. Heim's two-piece has fallen out of fashion.

The red swimsuits that the actresses wore in the TV series Baywatch have become iconic, such that the New York Times suggested "Athletic. Flattering. Red. Who needs a string bikini?" The creators of the show modeled the swimsuits after the ones worn by Southern California female lifeguards with an original intent of functionality over sexy looks. The swimsuits were custom-fitted for each actress; Alexandra Paul wore a suit with a higher neckline while shorter cast members wore suits with higher-cut legs to give the illusion of height.

== See also ==
- Monokini
- Swimming (sport)
