= Swim cap =

Cap worn while swimming or bathing

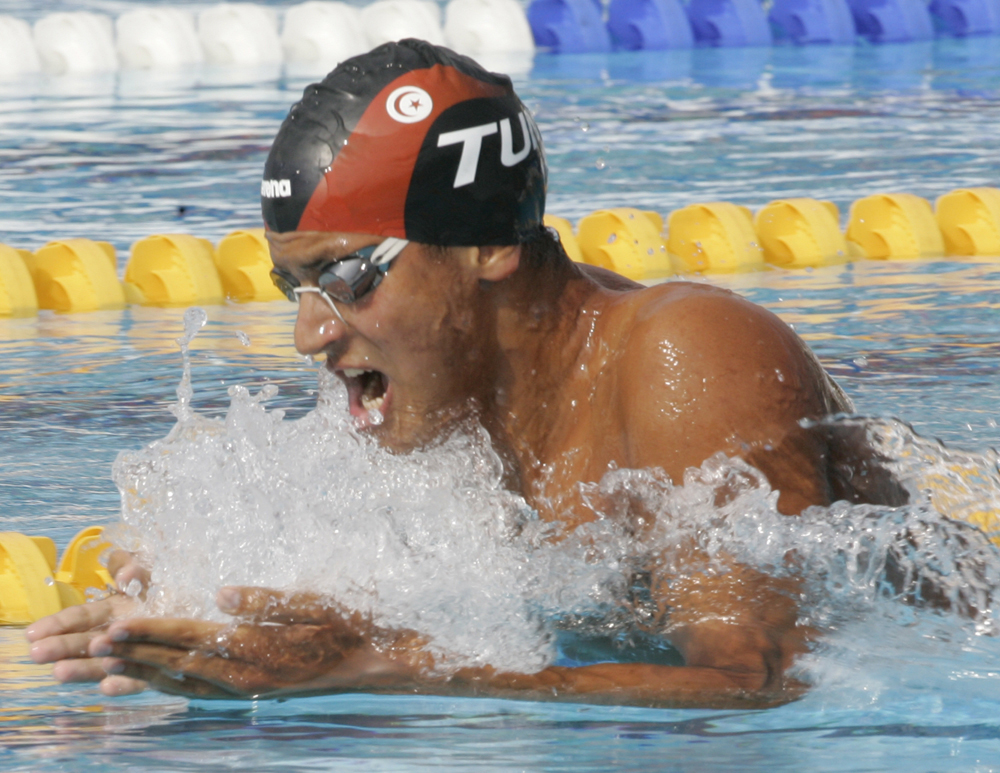
Oussama Mellouli wearing a competitive style swim cap

A swimming cap, swim cap or bathing cap, is a tightly fitted, skin-tight garment, commonly made from silicone, latex or lycra, worn on the head by recreational and competitive swimmers.

Swim caps are worn for various reasons: they can be worn to keep hair out of the swimmer's face, reduce drag, protect hair from chlorine or sun damage, keep hair dry, keep the head warm, or (sometimes in combination with earplugs) to keep water out of the ears. Caps can also be worn to identify skill level in swimming lessons.

== History ==
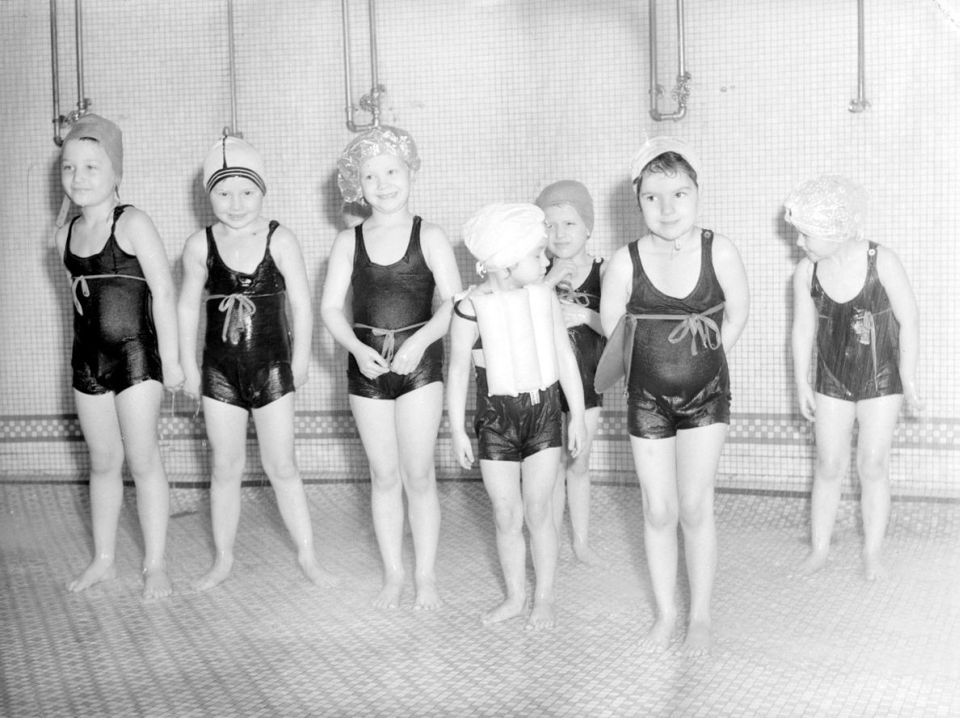
Young girls from a Montreal kindergarten wearing swimsuits and swim caps, 1943

Swim caps were made of rubberized fabric during the early 20th century. By the 1920s, they were made of latex. The earliest chin strap caps were known as "aviator's style caps" as they resembled the strapped leather helmets of flyers of the day. During the 1940s, swim caps became scarce as rubber was needed for war materials. The permanent wave hairstyle took time to obtain and was expensive, so many women wanted to protect their hair while swimming. The 1950s saw decorated caps come into vogue, and during the 1960s, colorful flower petal swim caps became popular. Men's long hair styles of the late 1960s and early 1970s gave rise to increased use of swim caps. Without swim cap requirements, wearing swim caps fell out of fashion during the 1970s. Swim caps are available in different styles: the traditional chin strap type with inner sealing to keep out water and colorful floral styles reminiscent of the 1960s as well as other graphic prints.

Recently, Toks Ahmed and Michael Chapman created a swim cap specifically designed for dreadlocks, hair weaves or extensions, and voluminous hair. They named it the Soul Cap, but it was banned at the 2020 Summer Olympics because of its size and configuration. On 2 September 2022, FINA approved the special cap's use for all future competitions.

== Double capping ==
Many swimmers have trouble finding a swim cap that keeps their hair dry. "Double capping"—wearing two swim caps—can provide a tighter swim cap seal. An inner silicone or latex swim cap pulled low over the ears worn under a second traditional style chin strap swim cap with an inner seal may provide the protection desired. "Double capping" is also used by participants of open water swimming to provide warmth.

In order to make as smooth a surface as possible for maximum streamlining, sometimes an inner latex cap is put on, followed by swim goggles over the latex cap, and then second snug silicone swim cap is fitted over both.

== English Channel swimming rules ==
The English "Channel Swimming and Piloting Federation" and the "Channel Swimming Association" state that "one standard swim cap" may be used for official English Channel record swims. The cap must be approved by the official observer who accompanies the swimmer on the pilot boat across the channel. "Standard swim caps" that have been used by English Channel swimmers of record over the years include solid rubber "tank" style swim caps, molded rubber swim caps with chin strap, bubble crepe rubber swim caps with chin strap, silicone swim caps and latex "racing" swim caps. Swim caps that have neoprene within the cap construction such as the "Barracuda Hothead", or that are completely made of neoprene are not allowed for record English Channel swims. Several other long distance swims such as the Santa Catalina Channel California swim have similar rules for record swims. Swim caps worn for open water swims should be of visible colors that contrast with the water so that observers may safely monitor them, and operators of vessels may see them.
