= Technology doping =

Practice of gaining a competitive advantage using sports equipment

Technology doping is the practice of gaining a competitive advantage using sports equipment. The World Anti-Doping Agency (WADA) considers prohibiting technologies if they are "performance-enhancing" or "being against the spirit of the sport". In 2006, WADA initiated a consultation on technology doping which is now officially recognised as a threat, whilst the decision to allow or ban a new technology, specifically relating to sports equipment, is the responsibility of each sport’s own governing body.

== Gray area ==
Since most sports require equipment of some sort, it can be tricky to determine what is technology doping and what is not. The governing authorities of different sports usually make judgment calls about the technological advances in their sport’s equipment. Technological advancements are often allowed unless the governing authorities feel they threaten the integrity of the sport. A report released immediately before the 2012 Summer Olympics quotes an extensive public survey that shows that people fear that sports engineering could: overshadow the triumph of human spirit and effort, make certain sports easier, create unfairness so the "best athletes" might not win, and ensure that rich athletes and countries have an advantage over the poor ones.

== Examples ==
=== LZR Racer swimsuit ===
The LZR Racer is a swimsuit by Speedo that was launched in 2008. It is made with a material that was designed to mimic shark skin. The suit allows for better oxygen flow to the muscles, holds the body in a more hydrodynamic position, and traps air which adds buoyancy.

At the 2008 Beijing Olympics, this suit was worn by many swimmers. In fact, some swimmers wore two or more of these suits at once to increase buoyancy. In total, 23 out of the 25 swimming world records broken at the Beijing Olympics were broken by swimmers wearing this suit. In subsequent competitions, many world records were broken by swimmers wearing the LZR suit.

There was widespread discussion over whether these suits were so technologically advanced that using them was technology doping. In 2009, FINA (Fédération Internationale de Natation) decided to ban all body-length swimsuits. Men's suits could only maximally cover from the waist to the knee. Women's suits could only cover from shoulder to knee. They also stipulated that the fabric used to make the suits must be a "textile" and the suit could not have fastening devices, such as zippers. These new rules took effect in January 2010.

=== Vaporfly shoes ===
The Nike Vaporfly running shoe was launched in 2017. Its sole has Pebax foam and a full-length carbon fiber plate. As with the LZR case, it was debated whether they were a form of technology doping. World Athletics ultimately decided that the Vaporfly shoe would be allowed at the 2020 Summer Olympics, while also instituting rule changes regarding availability of shoes on the open market, sole thickness, and the number of shanks.

=== Ionized shirts ===
A New Zealand firm has created “IonX shirts” which are made of a material that claims to contain a negatively charged electromagnetic field. It further claims that the shirt helps increase blood flow, which in turn helps deliver more oxygen to the muscles and remove lactic acid from the muscles more quickly. The World Anti-Doping Agency has ruled that since there is no scientific publication that confirms the material actually changes the body’s ion charges or enhances performance and also the material does not contain prohibited substances, this technology is not banned as of now.

=== Interactive materials ===
Researchers at the Commonwealth Scientific and Industrial Research Organisation, an Australian science agency, created a garment that can monitor movement and give feedback. For example, a basketball player can wear the material in the form of a sleeve. Then sensors in the material send information to a computer when the player takes shots and responds with audible tones, giving the athlete real-time feedback on their movements. Athletes can learn patterns of tones that indicate successful or unsuccessful movements and use these to make improvements. The material helps correct the athlete’s movement and helps the athlete gain muscle memory so they can continue to perform well once the material is taken away.

=== Mechanical doping ===
In cycling, mechanical doping is the use of a secret motor to propel the bicycle. It is banned by the Union Cycliste Internationale. One of the first allegations of mechanical doping was in the 2010 Tour of Flanders. The first confirmed use of mechanical doping was at the 2016 UCI Cyclo-cross World Championships. Bike inspections have become commonplace in road racing since the 2015 season. Riders found guilty of mechanical doping are subject to a fine ranging from 20,000 to 200,000 Swiss Francs and a suspension of at least six months. In the 2016 Tour de France, French officials utilized thermal cameras to enforce their policy against mechanical doping.

=== Artificial limbs ===
Amputees can compete in the Paralympic Games using artificial limbs. There has been debate on whether the artificial limbs confer an advantage over able-bodied athletes and whether athletes using them can participate in the Olympic Games. There has also been debate on the effect of the length of the artificial limbs in the Paralympic Games.

=== Telemetry hacking ===
Prior to the Women's World Gliding Championship at Lake Keepit 2020, the competition organisers mandated the use of a real time tracking system to make the sport more appealing to the general public. To maintain the challenge of the race the positions of each competitor was delayed by 15 minutes. After a few days of competing, the extreme accuracy with which the Australian pilots predicted the movements of their opponents lead to suspicions, and on the penultimate day of the contest the Australian team captain Terry Cubley (EO of the GFA), admitted hacking (whilst denying cheating) the live tracking, bypassing the 15 minute delay and radioing the real time position of the competing teams to the Australian pilots, giving them a substantial tactical advantage.

=== Recumbent bicycle ===
Recumbent bicycles broke cycling world records in the early 1930s before they were banned by the Union Cycliste Internationale (UCI) in 1934.

== Standardized equipment ==
Many sports set standards for equipment, to prevent unfair advantages between competitors. This often involves the types of materials the equipment is made from or dimensions/sizes. For example, tennis racquets must not exceed the maximum length and width limits. Association football balls must not exceed weight limits. Golf clubs must fit shape regulations.

One-design racing is a type of vehicle racing in which all competitors pilot identical vehicles. In theory the race depends only on the difference in the skill of the crew rather than the quality of the vehicle.

== See also ==
- Doping at the Asian Games
- Doping at the Commonwealth Games
- Doping at the Olympics
