= LZR Racer =

Line of competition swimsuits

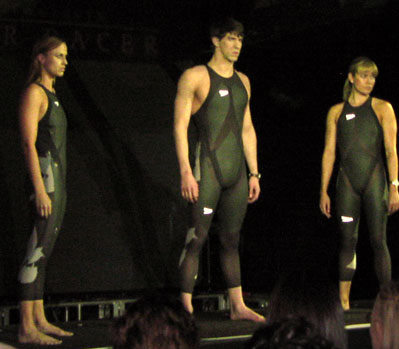
The LZR Racer Suit unveiling at a press conference in New York City in February 2008.

The LZR Racer (pronounced as "Laser Racer") is a line of competition swimsuits manufactured by Speedo using a high-technology swimwear fabric composed of woven elastane-nylon and polyurethane. The swimsuits are available in a full-body length; they compress the body and trap air for buoyancy. The LZR Pro and LZR Elite were launched on 13 February 2008; the higher-priced LZR Elite was replaced by the LZR Elite 2 in early 2014. The LZR X was launched in early 2015. The technology is patented in Italy, and protected worldwide.

On 24 July 2009, the FINA Congress voted almost unanimously to revise swimsuit regulations, requiring suits to be made from woven textile materials and restricting their permitted lengths. The changes rendered the LZR Racer and similar suits ineligible for competition from 1 January 2010.

== Design and development ==
The LZR Pro and LZR Elite were developed by Mectex, an Italian company, in association with the Australian Institute of Sport, with the help of Speedo's sponsored athletes. NASA's wind tunnel testing facilities and fluid flow analysis software supported the design. Both lines' aesthetics were designed in collaboration with the fashion brand Comme des Garçons.

The design result, called the LZR Racer, reduced skin friction drag by 24% compared to the previous Speedo swimsuit. Much like other suits used for high competition racing, LZR Racers allow better oxygen flow to the muscles, and hold the body in a more hydrodynamic position, while repelling water and increasing flexibility. The LZR Pro uses vertically stitched seams to minimize fluid resistance, while the seams of the LZR Elite, LZR Elite 2, and LZR X are ultrasonically welded to further reduce drag. The suits are manufactured at Petratex, a textile factory in Pacos de Ferreira, Portugal; the technology is patented in this country. The LZR Elite and LZR Elite 2 include patented Core Stabilizer and Internal Compression Panels. Speedo also partnered with ANSYS, an engineering simulation software provider, in creating this suit.

Endorsed for competitive use by FINA prior to the Beijing Olympics, early case studies suggested that the LZR Elite was effective in reducing the racing times of competitive swimmers by 1.9 to 2.2 percent. Although all body-length swimwear has since been banned from FINA competitions, swimmers are still permitted to compete in LZR Racer jammers and Kneeskins.

== Marketing and results ==
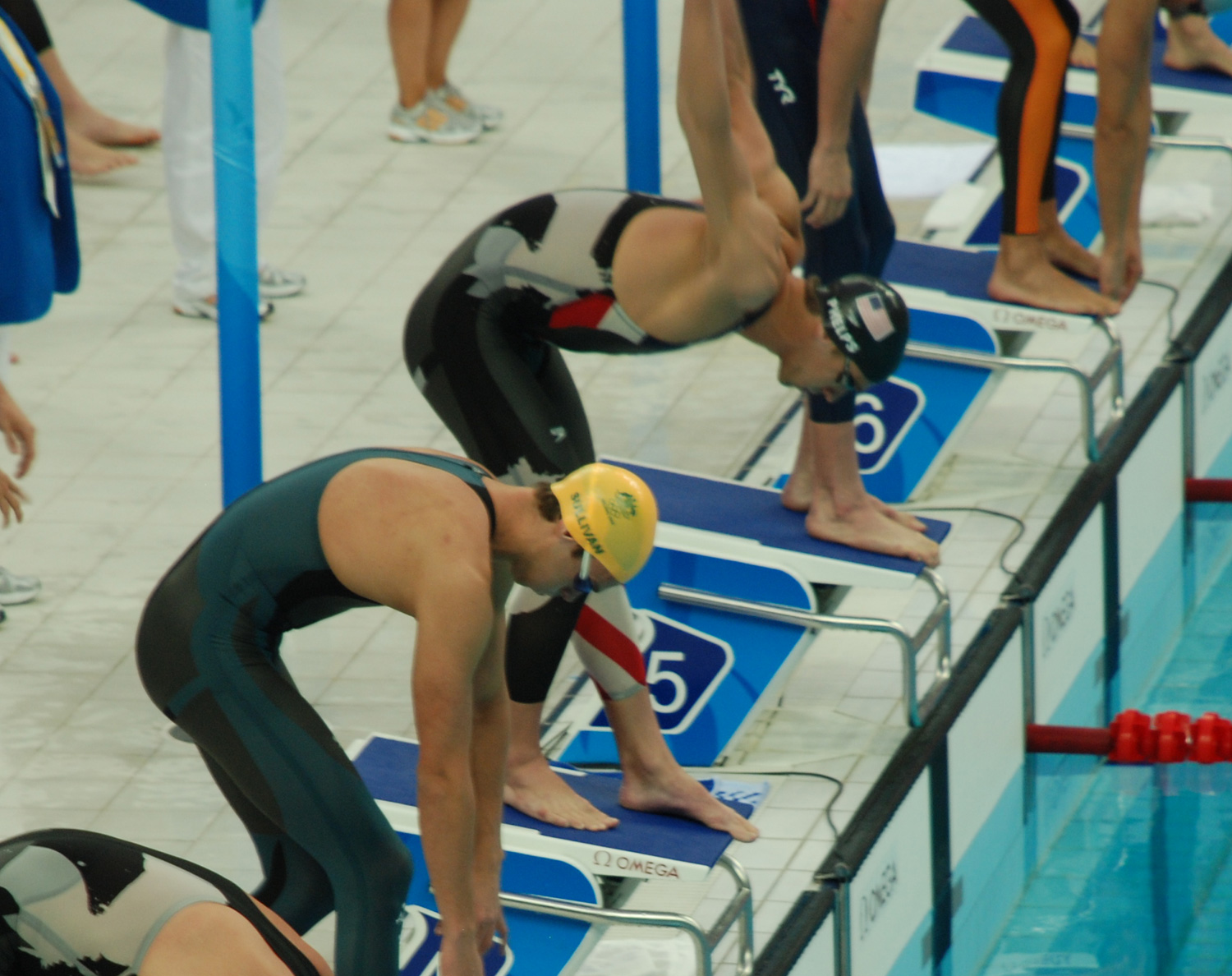
Michael Phelps of the United States and Eamon Sullivan of Australia at the start of the 4 × 100 m freestyle relay event at the 2008 Summer Olympics, Beijing. Both are wearing LZR Racer swimsuits

The LZR Pro and LZR Elite lines were launched on 13 February 2008. It was Speedo's campaign focus for the 2008 Summer Olympics, spearheaded by Michael Phelps of the United States. They created a holographic (visually generated) video of Phelps wearing the suit which was displayed in London, Sydney, New York, and Tokyo on the day of the suit's release.

Within a week of the LZR Racer's release, multiple world records were set by swimmers wearing the suit.

The LZR Racer's impact extended to the Beijing Olympics, where 94% of all swimming races were won in the suit. 98% of all swimming medals won and 23 of the 25 world records broken at the Beijing Olympics were won by swimmers wearing the suit. As of August 24, 2009, 93 world records had been broken by swimmers wearing a LZR Racer, and 33 of the first 36 Olympic medals have been won wearing it.

A problem arose for the Japanese Olympic swimmers, who had exclusive contracts with swimsuit makers Mizuno, Asics, and Descente, preventing them from wearing the Speedo brand suits in the Olympics. The Japanese Swimming Federation subsequently decided to allow its athletes to choose their own suits freely.

== FINA rule changes ==
Following the December 2008 European Short Course Championships in Croatia, where 17 world records were broken, it was felt there was a need to modify the rules surrounding swimsuits. The combined effects of the LZR both compressing the body and trapping air for buoyancy led to many competitors who used the LZR wearing two or more suits for an increased effect. This led to some claiming that the LZR was in effect "technological doping".

At its meeting in Dubai in March 2009, FINA stipulated that swimsuits should not cover the neck, must not extend past the shoulders and ankles, and also limit the suits' thickness and buoyancy. In a statement, FINA stated that by avoiding all questions of fabrics, impermeability, and buoyancy, FINA chose to deal with this situation by simply ruling on the lengths of swimsuits.

FINA wishes to recall the main and core principle that swimming is a sport essentially based on the physical performance of the athlete.

In an abrupt reversal of opinion, the FINA Congress, which was held in Rome on 24 July 2009, during the 2009 World Aquatics Championships, voted almost unanimously to revert its previous policy and ban all body-length swimsuits. Men's swimsuits may maximally cover the area from the waist to the knee, and women's counterparts from the shoulder to the knee. They also ruled that the fabric used must be a "textile", that is, consisting natural or synthetic yarns woven together. With the exception of drawstrings on male jammers, suits must not have any fastening devices such as a zipper. The new regulations took effect on 1 January 2010.
