= TYR Sport =

American sportswear company

TYR Sport, Inc.
- Type: Private
- Industry: Apparel, accessories
- Founded: 1985
- Founder: Steve Furniss; Joseph DiLorenzo
- Headquarters: Seal Beach, California, U.S.
- Area served: World-wide
- Key people: Matthew DiLorenzo (CEO), Steven Locke (COO)
- Products: Swimwear, Footwear, Triathlon Apparel, Sportswear, Accessories
- Website: tyr.com

TYR Sport, Inc. is an American designer, developer and manufacturer of competitive swim and triathlon apparel and related specialized athletics gear. It shares ownership with Swimwear Anywhere.

== History ==
TYR was founded in Huntington Beach, California by Joseph DiLorenzo and Steve Furniss in 1985.

The name TYR is a reference to the Norse god Týr.

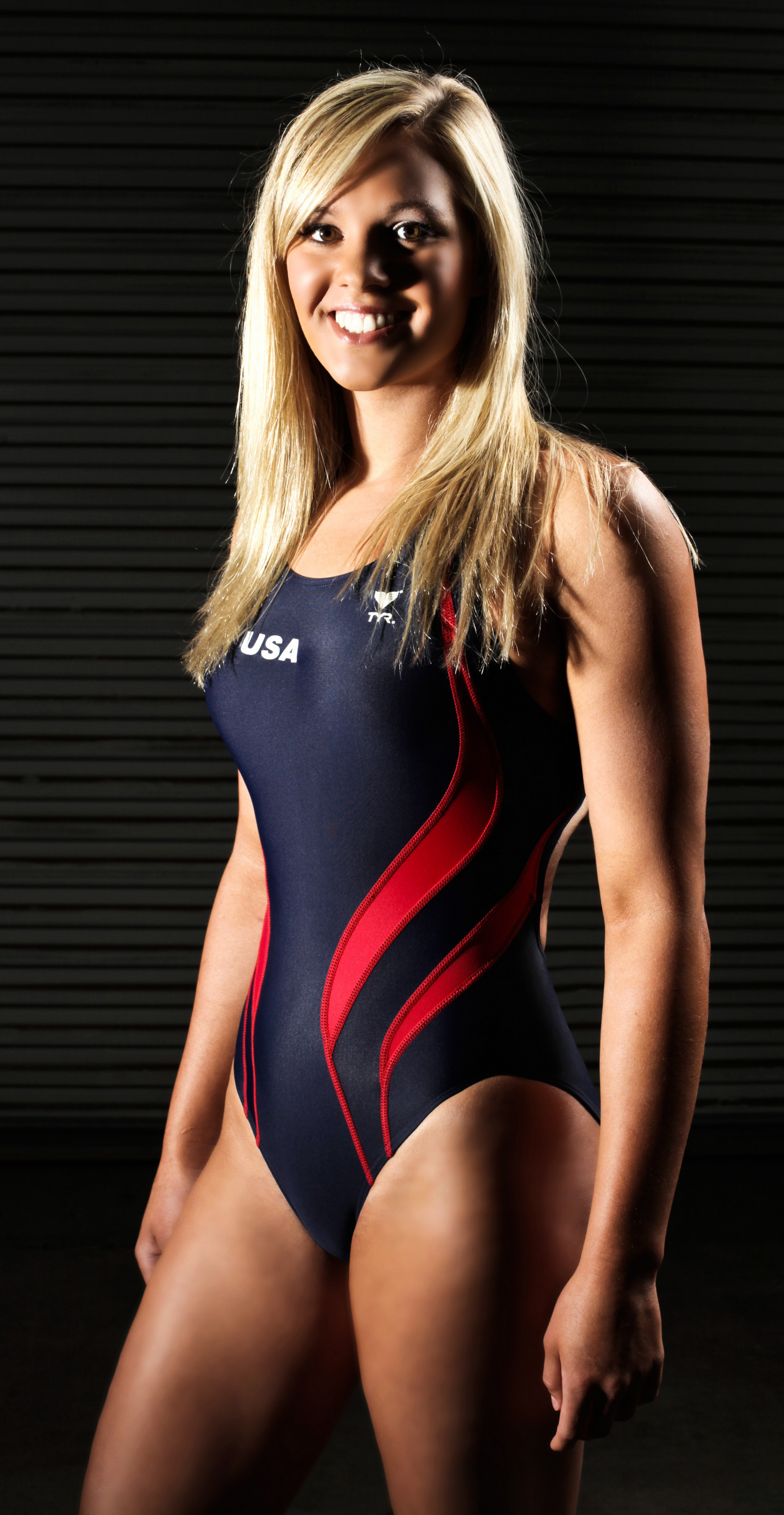
Chloe Sutton with TYR swimsuit

In 2010, Matthew DiLorenzo (Joseph's son) took over as Chief Executive Officer. In 2019, Steve Furniss retired after 34 years with the company.

The company expanded its portfolio by announcing in late 2021 that it would release a line of CrossFit and workout gear. According to Matthew DiLorenzo, the connection began when Corey Berger, 2014 and 2015 CrossFit Games athlete, was training for a half-Ironman (1.2 mile swim, 56 mile ride, 13.1 mile run)

In 2023, the company opened its first storefront in Roosevelt Field in Garden City.

TYR was named the official footwear and eyewear partner for the 2023 SBD World’s Strongest Man competition. The company was the exclusive outfitter of the USA Swimming National Team through the 2024 Olympics.

== Sponsorship ==
TYR sponsors many professional athletes; it dubs them Team TYR, as well as the national swimming teams in the U.S. and in Singapore. In 2018, TYR bought the title rights to USA Swimming's domestic circuit, the Pro Swim Series.

In 2023, it was announced that TYR would be the official outfitter for USA Diving.

TYR Sport supplied much of the competitive swimwear and aquatic equipment used in the original Baywatch television series. Beginning in the early 1990s, many cast members wore TYR-branded swimsuits, particularly during lifeguard training, rescue sequences, and water sports scenes. The partnership helped reinforce the show's emphasis on authentic lifeguard and swimming gear while also increasing TYR's visibility as a leading manufacturer of performance swimwear and accessories.

In June 2025, TYR Sport was announced as an exclusive partner for World Aquatics, and in 2026 named the swim partner for the 2026 CrossFit Games where all competitors wear specification swimwear from TYR Sport.

== See also ==
- List of swimwear brands
- Aquapel, a technical racing swimsuit designed by TYR
- Aquashift, another technical racing swimsuit designed by TYR
