= Polyether block amide =

Thermoplastic elastomer

Polyether block amide or PEBA is a thermoplastic elastomer (TPE). It is known under the tradename of PEBAX® (Arkema) and VESTAMID® E (Evonik Industries). It is a block copolymer obtained by polycondensation of a carboxylic acid polyamide (PA6, PA11, PA12) with an alcohol termination polyether (Polytetramethylene glycol PTMG), PEG). The general chemical structure is:

HO - (CO - PA - CO - O - PE - O)_{n} - H

PEBA is a high performance thermoplastic elastomer. It is used to replace common elastomers – thermoplastic polyurethanes, polyester elastomers, and silicones - for these characteristics: lower density among TPE, superior mechanical and dynamic properties (flexibility, impact resistance, energy return, fatigue resistance) and keeping these properties at low temperature (lower than -40 °C), and good resistance against a wide range of chemicals. It is sensitive to UV degradation, however.

== Applications ==
PEBA is found in the sports equipment market: for damping system components and midsoles of high end shoes (running, track & field, football, baseball, basketball, trekking, etc.) where it is appreciated for its low density, damping properties, energy return and flexibility. PEBA is also appreciated by winter sports participants as it enables design of the lightest alpine and Nordic ski boots while providing some resistance to extreme environment (low temperatures, UV exposure, moisture). It is used in various other sports applications such as racquet grommets and golf balls.

PEBA is used in medical products such as catheters for its flexibility, its good mechanical properties at low and high temperatures, and its softness.

It is also widely used in the manufacture of electric and electronic goods such as cables and wire coatings, electronic device casings, components, etc.

PEBA can be used to make textiles as well as breathable film, fresh feeling fibres or non-woven fabrics.

Some hydrophilic grades of PEBA are also used for their antistatic and antidust properties. Since no chemical additives are required to achieve these properties, products can be recycled at end of life.

== Physical properties ==
| Properties | Unit | Value |
|---|---|---|
| Melting Point | °C | 134–174 |
| Density | g/cm^{3} | 1.00 - 1.03 |
| Water absorption at equilibrium (23 °C, 50% RH) | % | 0.4–0.7 |
| Water absorption at saturation (23 °C, 24H in water) | % | 0.9–1.2 |
| Shore Hardness | Shore D | 25–72 |
| Flexural modulus | MPa | 12–513 |
| Tensile strength at break | MPa | 32-56 |
| Elongation at break | % | 300–750 |
| Impact resistance (Charpy, notched) | kJ/m^{2} | No break |
| Abrasion resistance (10 N/40 m) | mm^{3} | 55–130 |
| Surface resistivity | Ω/sq | 10^{9}–10^{13} |
| Volume resistivity | Ω·cm | 10^{9}–10^{13} |
