= Competitive swimwear =

Swimsuit, clothing, equipment and accessories used in the aquatic competitive sports

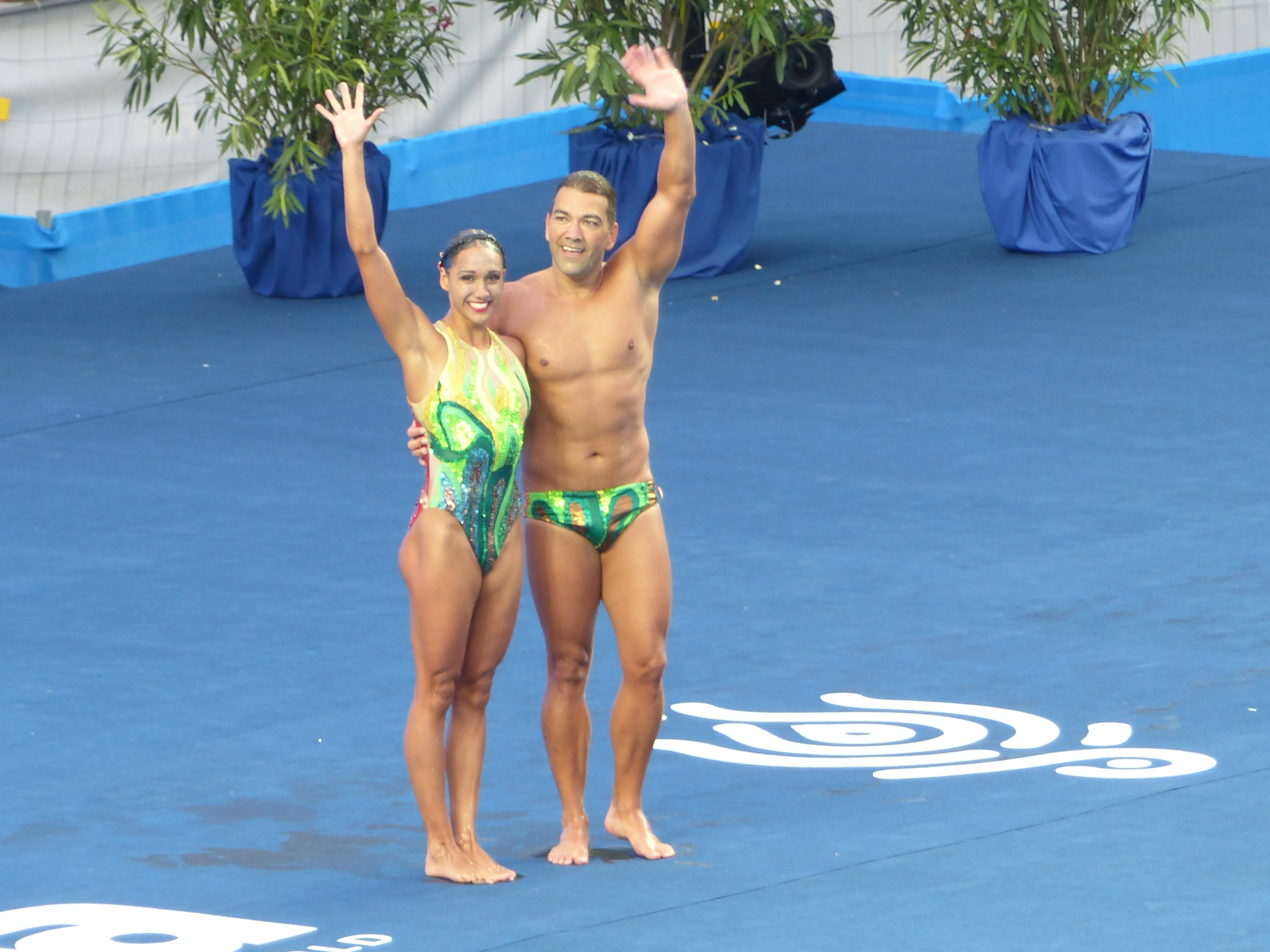
Mixed-sex pair wearing swimsuits, participating in the World Aquatics Championships for synchronized swimming

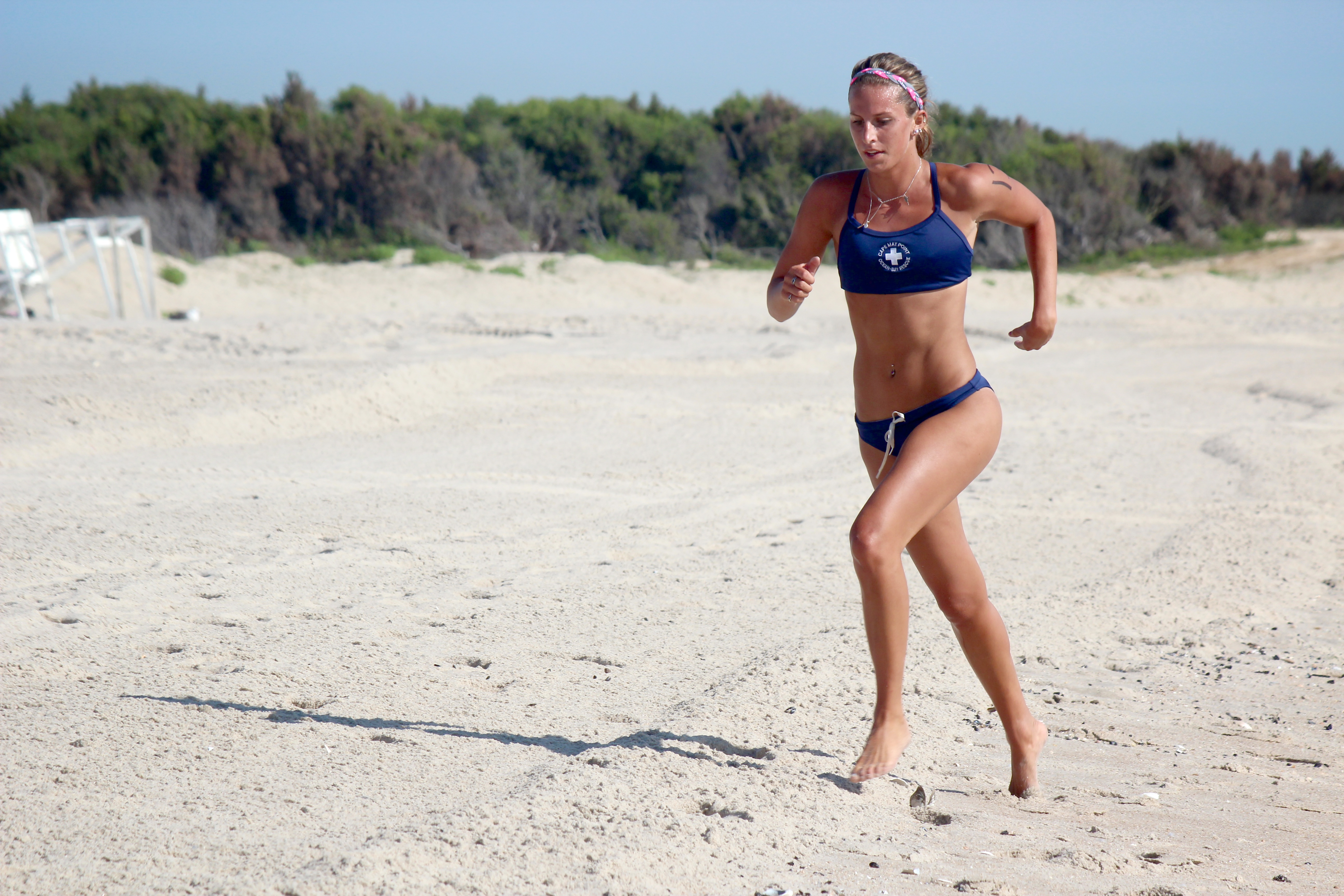
Woman wearing a competitive racerback bikini

Competitive swimwear refers to the swimsuit, clothing, equipment and accessories used in the aquatic sports of swimming, diving, synchronized swimming, triathlon and water polo.

Some swimsuits are designed specifically for swimming competitions where they may be constructed of a special low-resistance fabric that reduces skin drag. Most competitive swimmers wear special swimsuits including partial bodysuits, racerback styles, jammers and racing briefs to assist their glide through the water thus gaining a speed advantage.

For diving in water temperatures above 25 °C (77 °F), special bodysuits called "dive skins" are worn. These suits are made from spandex and provide little thermal protection, but they protect the skin from jellyfish stings, sunburn, and abrasion. This kind of suit is also known as a 'Stinger Suit'. Some divers wear a dive skin under a wetsuit, which allows easier donning and (for those who experience skin problems from neoprene) provides additional comfort.

Unlike regular swimsuits, which are designed mainly for aesthetic appearances, swimsuits intended to be worn during competitions are manufactured to assist the athlete in swimming competitions. They reduce friction and drag in the water, increasing the swimmer's forward motion efficiency. The tight fits allow for easy movement and are said to reduce muscle vibration, thus reducing drag. This also reduces the possibility that a high-forward dive will remove a diver's swimwear. Starting around 2000, to improve the effectiveness of the swimsuits, engineers have taken to designing them to replicate the skin of sea-based animals, sharks in particular.

In July 2009, World Aquatics (then FINA) voted to ban non-textile (non-woven) swimsuits in competitive events from 2010. The new policy was implemented to combat the issues associated with performance-enhancing swimsuits, hindering the ability to accurately measure the performance of swimmers. Subsequently, the new ruling states that male swimsuits may maximally cover the area from the navel to the knee and female counterparts from the shoulder to the knee.

Some swimmers use a specialized training suit called drag suits to artificially increase drag during practice. Drag suits are swimwear with an outer layer of looser fabric – often mesh or nylon – to increase resistance against the water and build up the swimmer's endurance. They come in a variety of styles, but most resemble a looser fitting square-cut or swim brief.

== History ==
The history of competitive swimwear has been dominated by concerns over public nudity in the first half of the 20th century and by efforts to reduce water drag in the second half. Those efforts initially lead male swimmers to reduce the early sagging one-piece swimsuits down to briefs only. Goggles were used in the crossing of the English Channel back in 1911, but only in 1970 appeared at international competitions. With the advent of rubber technology, latex swimming caps became mass-produced in the 1920s, and more efficient silicone caps appeared in the 1970s.

With the development of new materials that tightly fit the body and offered lower resistance to water than human skin, this trend was reversed to a complete body coverage from heels to neck and wrists. In 1999, Australian competitive swimmer Ian Thorpe signed with Adidas for an undisclosed six-figure sum, to race in their new bodysuit, although the national team was sponsored and wore outfits designed by Speedo. Thorpe's success in the 2000 Summer Olympics wearing the Adidas full-length black polyurethane bodysuit, in contrast to other swimmers wearing textile swimwear (males wore legskins, jammers, or briefs, while females wore racerback maillots), led to other swimming manufacturers such as Speedo and Mizuno to create their own rival bodysuits. Thorpe subsequently worked with Adidas which in 2003 released the Adidas Jetconcept bodysuit, whose design "came from the V-shaped grooves currently used on the wings and fuselage of civil aircraft".

The LZR Pro and Elite lines were launched on February 13, 2008, with the LZR Elite being marketed as "the world's fastest swimsuit." It was the focus of Speedo's campaign for the 2008 Summer Olympics, spearheaded by Michael Phelps of the United States. They created a holographic (visually generated) video of Phelps wearing the suit which was displayed in London, Sydney, New York, and Tokyo on the day of the suit's release. Speedo's LZR Racer had become so effective by the eve of the 2008 games that many swimmers, despite them or their swimming federations having exclusive contracts with other apparel makers, have chosen the LZR Racer over competing bodysuits. At that year's Olympics in Beijing, 94% of all swimming races were won in that suit, 98% of all medals won that year were by swimmers wearing that suit, which also accounted for 23 out of the 25 world records broken either at the Sydney games or its qualifying competitions. As of 24 August 2009, 93 world records had been broken by swimmers wearing a LZR Racer, and 33 of the first 36 Olympic medals have been won wearing it.

In 2009, FINA rules and regulations were altered, effective from 1 January 2010. Suits made with polyurethane were banned because they made athletes more buoyant. These rules also banned suits that go above the navel or below the knee for men and suits that extend past the shoulders or cover the neck for women FINA stated that it "wishes to recall the main and core principle is that swimming is a sport essentially based on the physical performance of the athlete".

== Suits ==
=== Bodyskin ===
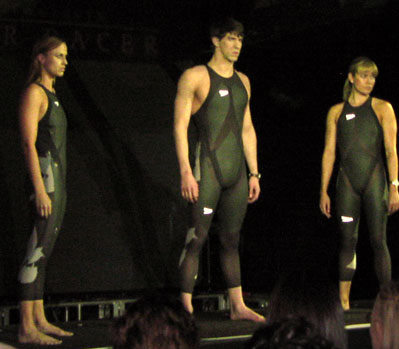
Bodyskin swimsuits worn by Amanda Beard (left), Michael Phelps (center), and Natalie Coughlin (right).

A bodyskin is a style of competitive swimwear worn by both female and male athletes. Bodyskins are normally made of technologically advanced lycra-based fabrics designed to hug the body tightly and provide increased speed and decreased drag resistance in the water.

The bodyskin resembles the design of a dive skin, commonly used by snorkelers and scuba divers for warm weather climates. The primary distinguishing feature is the material from which the bodyskin suit is made.

Some bodysuits provide full body coverage from the ankles to the neck and wrists, such as Ian Thorpe's Adidas Jetconcept bodysuit, which made its debut in 2003. Sleeveless designs such as the Speedo LZR Racer were popular in the 2008 Summer Olympics; Speedo also produces a body skin designed specifically for the backstroke. Other competing bodysuits include Acquablade, Fastskin, and Sharkskin, which are produced by Mizuno, Asics, Descente, Arena, and Nike.

Swimmers reported that body skins improved buoyancy. This is true as long as the suits remain dry. As such, they are recommended for distances under 200m.

The national coach of a small country stated that the suits need exact sizing and resulting high cost "increas[ed] the disparity between the haves and have nots." As with most technologically advanced fabric swimwear, body skins were only commonly used at highly competitive levels of the swimming sport and are known to sell for prices over US$400. Despite their cost, a single bodysuit can only be used for a handful of races, as getting in and out of the suit repeatedly would damage its form-fitting properties, memorably when Thorpe tore his Adidas bodysuit right before the 4×100 men's freestyle relay podium ceremony in the 2000 Summer Olympics.

Bodyskins were banned from World Aquatics competitions from the start of 2010 after many national swimming federations demanded the action, and leading athletes such as Michael Phelps and Rebecca Adlington criticised the suits. They continue to be used for other purposes, including research.

=== Briefs ===
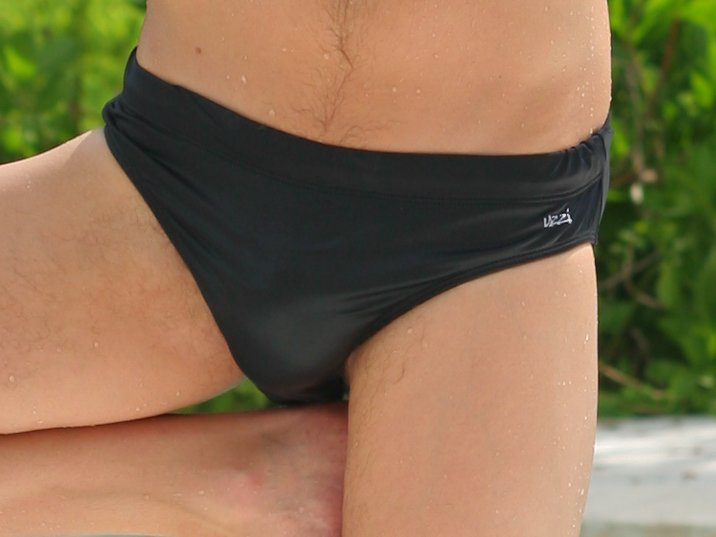
A man wearing swim briefs

A swim brief refers to any briefs style male swimsuit such as those worn in competitive swimming, water polo and diving. The popularity of the Australian Speedo (est. 1928) brand racing brief has led to the use of its name in some countries (e.g. the United States) to refer to any racing brief, regardless of the maker. Occasionally, the Speedo generic trademark also applies to square cut swimsuits, but in general, the generic term is used for swim briefs. Swim briefs are also referred to as competition briefs, bathers, racer bathers, posing briefs, racing briefs, and colloquially in Australia as "budgie smugglers".

Like underwear briefs, swim briefs feature a V-shape front and a solid back providing form-fitting coverage. They typically are worn below the lower waist. They are generally secured by thin banding at the upper thighs and either a drawstring around the waist or an elastic waistband. Swim briefs are most often made of a nylon and spandex (Lycra) composite, while some longer-lasting suits are made from polyester and still others from other materials. Most swim briefs have a beige or white front lining made of a similar fabric.

=== Drag suit ===
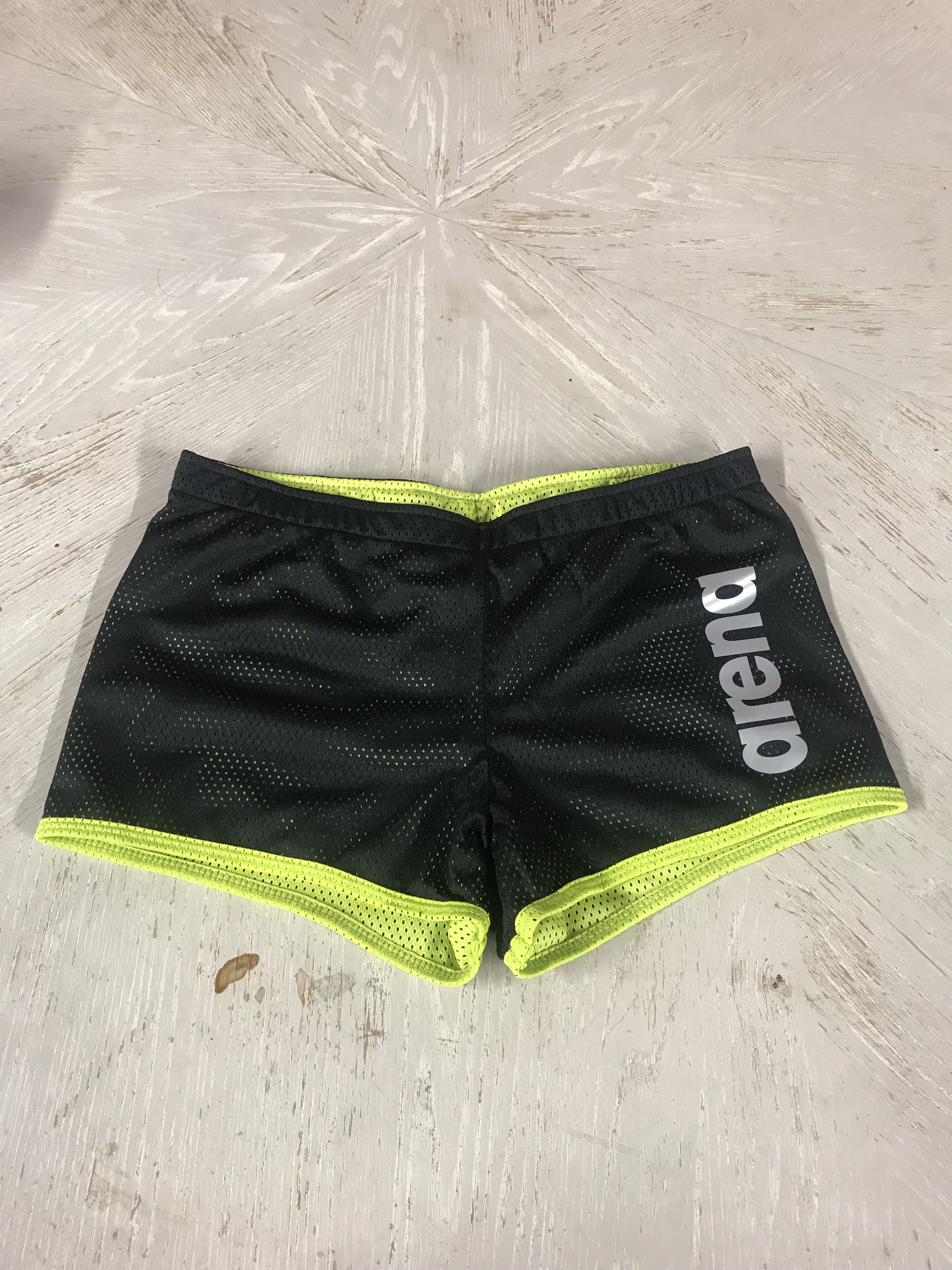
A drag suit designed by Arena.

A drag suit is a pair of baggy square-cut or brief-style trunks that competitive swimmers may wear over their normal suit to provide extra resistance ("drag") from the water. This allows the swimmer to get more out of their training than they would without a drag suit. Drag suits are meant to be worn over a long period of time to wear in the material and possibly tear the fabric. The more worn-in, torn or ripped the drag suit, the more resistance it provides the swimmer. Since drag suits make swimming more difficult, swimmers do not wear drag suits in competition. Drag suits originated as older swimsuits at the end of their useful life that swimmers would then wear over another suit.

=== Kneeskin ===
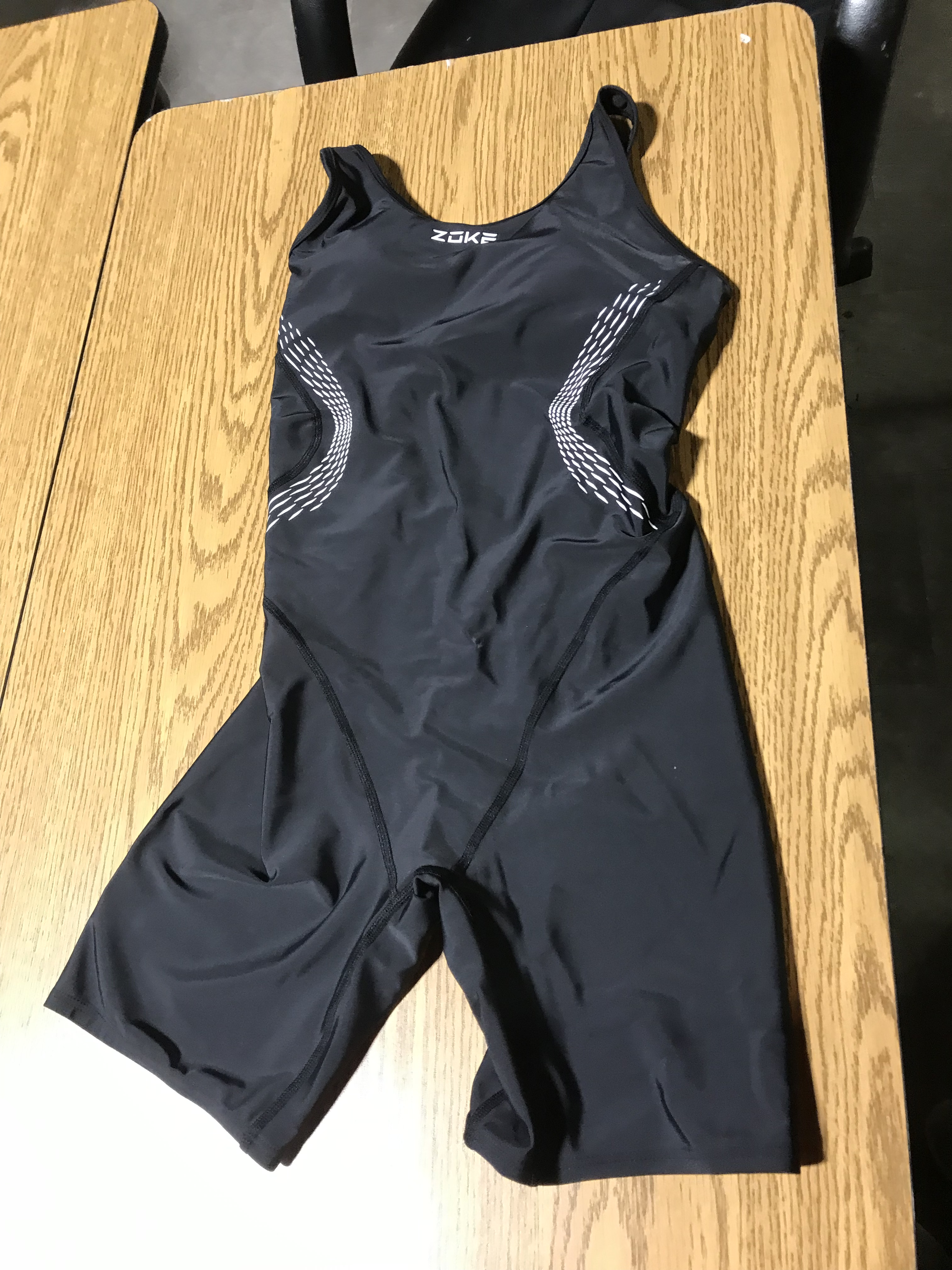
A kneeskin swimsuit

A kneeskin is a type of competitive swimwear worn by female swimmers. It is no longer worn by male competitive swimmers due to the requirement that they keep their upper body uncovered. Kneeskins are normally made of technologically advanced lycra-based fabrics designed to hug the body tightly and provide increased speed and decreased drag resistance in the water.

The kneeskin is similar in design to the full bodyskin, but the kneeskin does not have leggings covering or beyond the knee. The kneeskin resembles a "shortie" style wetsuit only made of drag-reducing fabric instead of neoprene and commonly features a zippered back. Most competitive swimwear brands such as the Speedo LZR Racer line, TYR Sport and Arena Powerskin line produce suits of this type. As with most technologically advanced fabric swimwear, kneeskin suits are only commonly used at highly competitive levels of the swimming sport and are known to sell for prices in excess of US$200.

=== Jammer ===
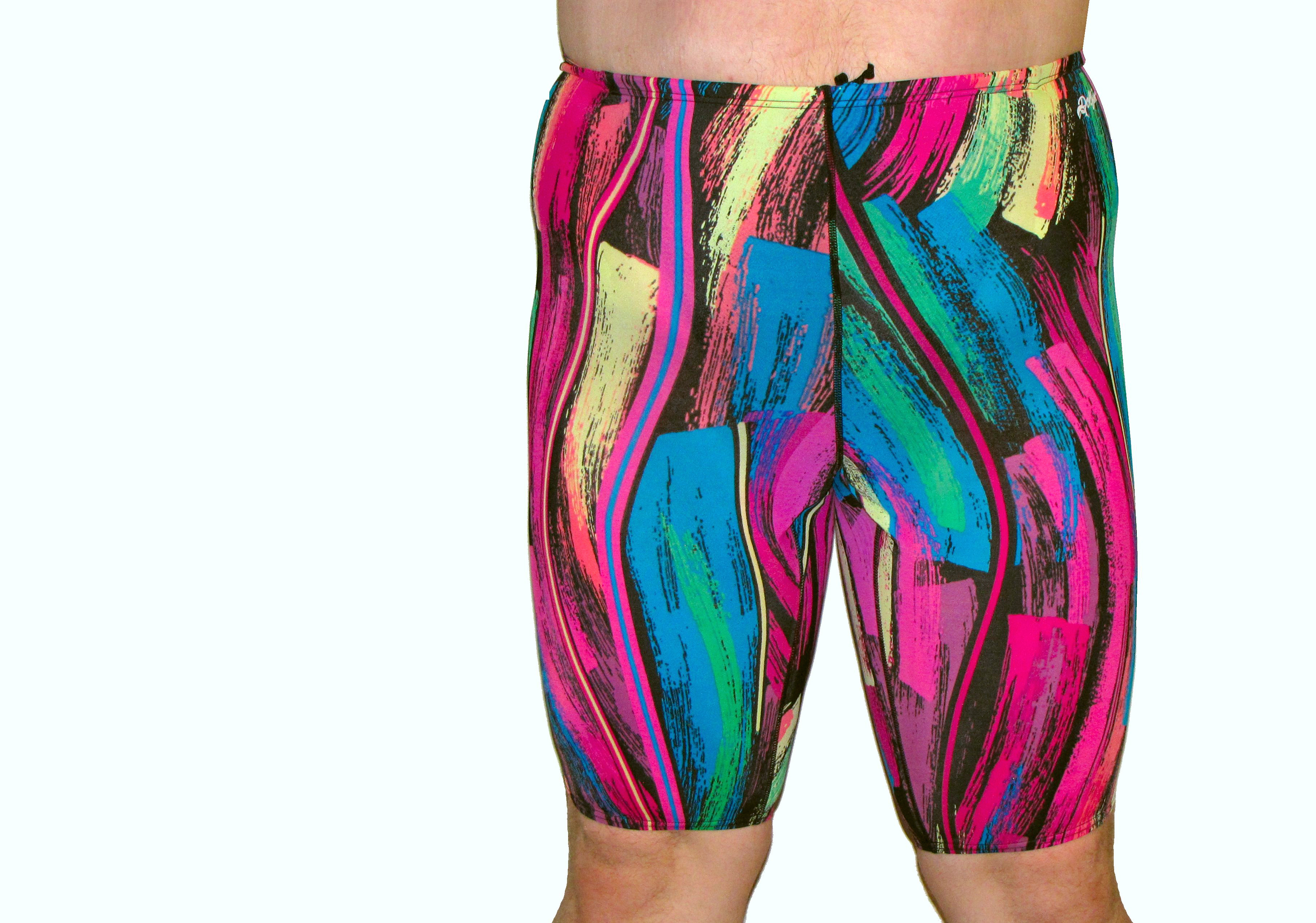
Swim jammer

A jammer, also called a swim jammer, is a style of swimsuit worn by male swimmers, used mainly in competition to obtain speed advantages. They are generally made of nylon and lycra/spandex material, but may be made of polyester, and have a form fitting design to reduce water resistance. The materials usually dry fairly quickly. They provide moderate coverage from the mid-waist to the area above the knee, somewhat resembling cycling shorts or compression shorts worn by many athletes. They provide greater leg coverage than swim briefs and square leg suits, although they also have slightly more water resistance.

=== Legskin ===
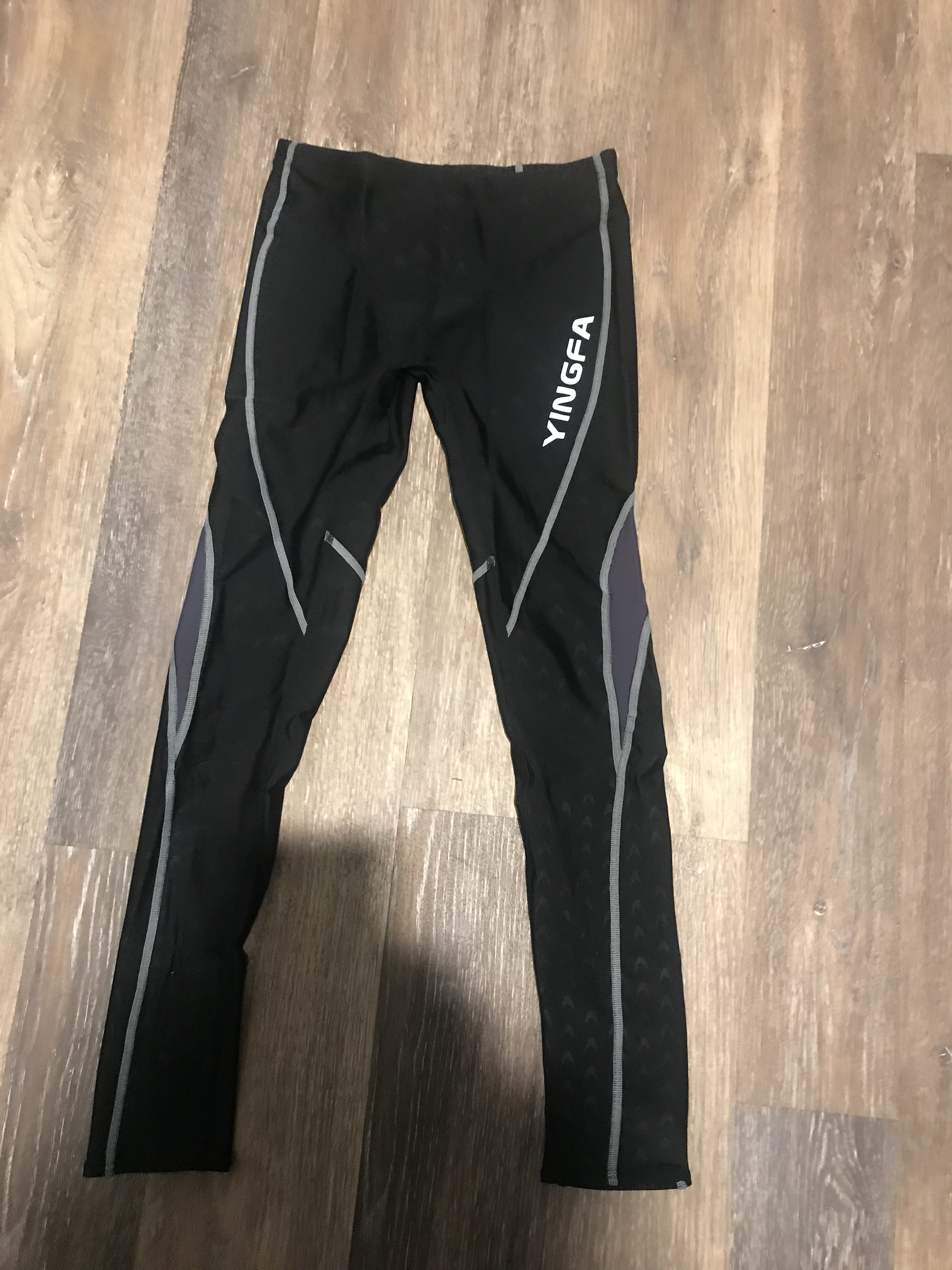
A legskin swimsuit

A legskin is a type of competitive swimwear worn by male swimmers. Most legskins are made of technologically advanced lycra-based fabrics designed to hug the body tightly and provide increased speed and decreased drag resistance in the water. The legskin covers from the swimmer's mid-waist to his ankle and resembles leggings. One advantage of the legskin over other suit styles that cover the arms is flexibility, especially for strokes that require broad arm movement.

Since 2009, legskins have been banned for competition swimming by FINA since they gave an unfair advantage to swimmers who wore them; the ban includes bodysuits.

=== Racerback ===
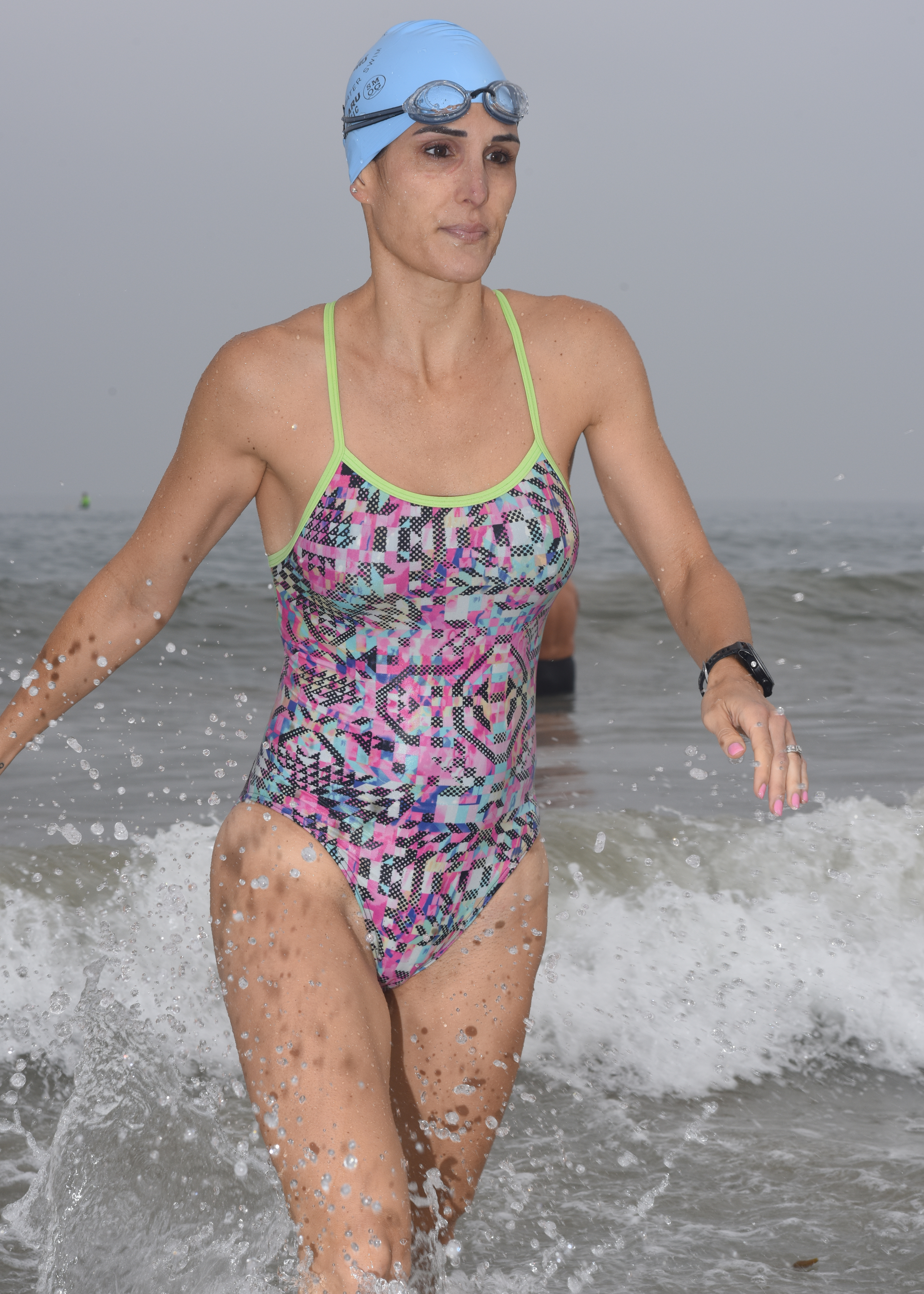
A woman wearing a racerback one-piece swimsuit

A racerback is a type of women's swimsuit design common today among competitive swimwear and incorporated into some types of women's clothing. The top-back of the swimsuit is not covered to provide flexibility and movement of the arms during swimming.

=== Square cut ===
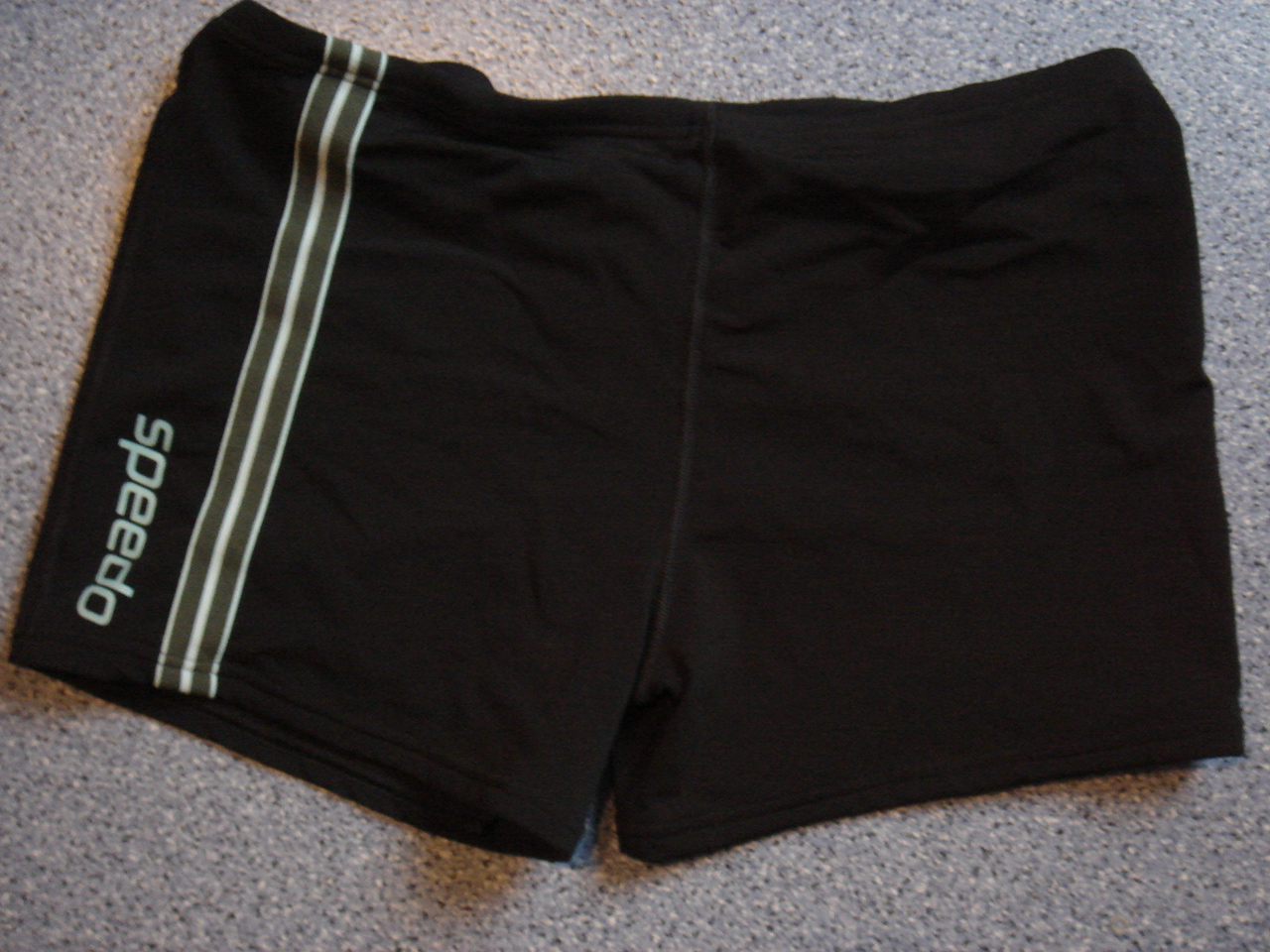
Square cut swimsuit

The square cut or square leg style suit is a form-fitting male swimsuit used as a slightly less revealing style than swim briefs for water polo and diving, or for recreational wear. Like swim briefs, they are made of a nylon and spandex blend. They typically sit low on the waist and high on the thigh, but provide more coverage for the upper leg than briefs. The square-cut style was popular as a recreational swimsuit for men during the 1950s.

Suits of this type are named for the coverage that they provide to the upper thighs due to a square seam opening for the leg. Square leg suits range in appearance from those similar to swim briefs with a slightly straighter front and wider side panelling (eliminating the arc appearance on the leg), to those resembling boxer briefs by providing an inch or more of fabric coverage over the upper section of the leg.

The square leg suit of the 1970s made a fashion revival in Australia in 2002 with the introduction of colorful floral and retro geometric patterned suits by swimwear label Way Funky. The style is popular amongst competitive swimmers for pool training and for recreational swimmers in the pool and at the beach.

== Accessories ==
- Earplug – Device to protect ears from loud noises
- Fistgloves – Self-propulsion of a person through water
- Goggles – Forms of protective eyewear that do not enclose the nose
- Hand paddle – Plastic plate worn on the hand by swimmers during training
- Kickboard – Device used to keep someone above water
- Noseclip – Device worn during water activities
- Pull buoy – Floatation device used in swim workouts
- Snorkel – Tube for breathing face down at the surface of the water
- Swim cap – Cap worn while swimming or bathing
- Training fin – Footwear used for personal propulsion through water
- Weight belt – Ballast carried to counteract buoyancy
