= A.J. Wright =

American off-price retailer

AJWright
- Type: Subsidiary
- Industry: Retail
- Founded: September 20, 1998
- Defunct: 2011
- Fate: Some stores converted to either T.J. Maxx, Marshalls or HomeGoods, other stores closed beginning late January to early February
- Headquarters: Framingham, Massachusetts
- Products: Clothing, footwear, bedding, furniture, jewelry, beauty products, and housewares.
- Parent: TJX
- Website: Archived official website at the Wayback Machine (archive index)

AJWright (formatted as A.J. Wright until 2009) was an American retail chain that existed from 1998 to 2011. Owned by TJX, like its sister company T.J. Maxx, AJWright sold clothing, domestics, giftware, footwear, accessories, and fragrances at prices between twenty and seventy percent below regular prices. AJWright differed from other TJX chains by refreshing its merchandise on a regular basis. For most stores, new shipments arrived every weekday. It had about 129 locations in 2007. In early 2011, TJX closed the chain's remaining stores and converted some stores to other TJX brands.

Although moderate-income families were AJWright's main target market, other consumer groups were drawn by the company's recent expansion. The company's community service strategy centered on monetary donations to the Boys & Girls Clubs of America and other affiliates.

== History ==
AJWright's former logo, used until 2009

AJWright was established on September 20, 1998, and opened its first six stores in the northeastern region of the United States in the fall of 1998. The first three stores – located in the towns of Brockton, Somerville, and Malden, Massachusetts – were opened simultaneously on September 20 of that year. During the initial openings, Johnson & Wales University's marketing director, Mark Neckes, approved of AJWright; he stated that AJWright strengthens TJX's coverage of urban markets, an area "where people need a place to shop [and] a place where retailers understand what people are looking for".

AJWright continued to open new stores as its customer base increased. By 2000, AJWright operated 25 stores across the United States; by December 2001, the number had increased to 40. The chain opened an additional 112 stores by the end of 2005, bringing its total to 152; however, this number fluctuated due to store closures. In 2006, one business article stated that AJWright was "in the red" and that TJX needed to "figure out the future of its newer divisions, the less profitable AJWright and HomeGoods stores and the non-off-price Bob’s Stores". Therefore, the company chose to focus on lowering the rapid expansion of the chain.

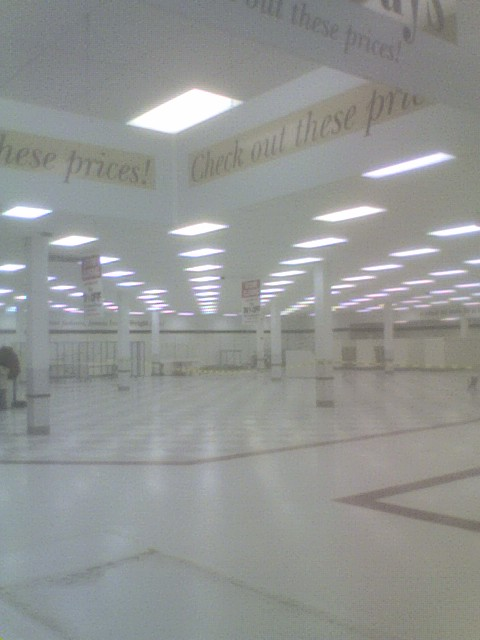
One of the 34 stores undergoing closing procedures

On November 30, 2006, TJX announced the closure of 34 underproducing stores. According to a TJX 10-Q on December 1, 2006, the closures were determined by "several factors, including market demographics and proximity to other AJWright stores, cash return, sales volume and productivity, recent comparable store sales and profit trends, and overall market performance". Employees were provided with severance packages or offers to transfer to other AJWright or TJX stores. Ben Cammarata, CEO of TJX, stated:

In our ongoing pursuit to drive profitable sales, we have made a strategic decision that we believe makes AJWright a stronger business and puts it in a substantially better position for future growth. By closing 34 of the 162 AJWright stores, we eliminate marginally profitable stores and accomplish several important things: we substantially reduce the number of advertising markets in which we operate, enabling us to better lever marketing dollars and efforts; we gain efficiencies in store operations and logistics; and we have greater ability to focus management attention and resources on the bulk of AJWright stores that are performing well, so that we can build upon that base and grow successfully.

The tentative closure date for the stores was January 27, 2007. Because of closing expenses, TJX expected to include a reduction of $37 million in their fourth quarter 2006 net income statement. On February 21, 2007, TJX reported that the net income had fallen from $288.7 million the previous year to $205.5 million; the reduction included the $37 million closing expenses. The company expected to open about ten new stores by 2008.

During this period, the TJX database was hacked and customer information was compromised. Although TJX originally stated that the security breach occurred between May 2006 and January 2007, the company discovered that the database had also been compromised in 2005.

AJ Wright also had several internal issues involving the Loss Prevention staff including its manager Bud Pelky of Nordstrom, willingly and coercively stealing money and product from its Connecticut stores. Hamden, Bridgeport and Wethersfield being the most hit. Waterbury, CT also was being pilfered through actions such Security staff taking product and money or letting known associates of the Loss Prevention staff enter the store and steal bagfuls of merchandise multiple times per day. This was caught by a LP staff member who was then “set up to fail” due to his notifying AJ Wrights internal investigation department. It was only one month later these stores closed for good.

In December 2010, TJX announced a consolidation that would eliminate the A.J. Wright chain. Many A.J. Wright stores were converted into T.J. Maxx, Marshalls or HomeGoods stores, while the remaining were permanently shuttered along with distribution centers. The entire process resulted in approximately 4400 layoffs.

== Slogans ==
- "Part of your family. Part of your community."
- "More of what you like, for less."
- "A whole lot more for a whole lot less. Every day."

== See also ==
- BJ's Wholesale Club
- Home Club
- Zayre
