= Carol Meyrowitz =

American business executive (born 1954)

- Born: 1954 (age 71–72)
- Education: Bachelor of Arts/Science
- Alma mater: Rider University (BS)
- Occupation: Executive Chairman
- Employer: TJX Companies

Carol M. Meyrowitz (born 1954) is an American business executive who is the executive chairman of the board and the chairman of the executive committee of TJX Companies, the leading off-price retailer in the United States. As of 2015, she is listed as the 76th most powerful woman in the world by Forbes. As of 2014, she was also ranked as the 12th most powerful woman in the world by Fortune.

== Biography ==
Born to a Jewish family, Meyrowitz graduated from Rider University with a bachelor's in marketing and management. She serves as a director of Amscan Holdings Inc. and Staples Inc. She's a member of The Boston Club's corporate advisory board, the board of governors for The Chief Executives' Club of Boston and the board of overseers for the Joslin Diabetes Center.

== History with TJX ==
Meyrowitz joined TJX Companies in 1983. In 2001, she became an Executive Vice President of the company, as well as the president of MarMaxx Group, the largest division of the company operating T.J. Maxx and Marshalls stores. She rose to Senior Executive Vice President in March 2004, which she maintained until January 2005. In January 2005, she left her positions and became an advisor for TJX and Berkshire Partners. Her plan was to leave the advisory role in September of that year to "pursue new opportunities and challenges" outside of TJX.

However, Meyrowitz became president on October 17, 2005; additionally, she became a member of the board of directors on September 7, 2006. She was appointed chief executive officer (CEO) of the company on January 28, 2007, replacing acting CEO Bernard Cammarata, the chairman of the board for TJX.

In January 2016 she was replaced as CEO by Ernie Herrman.

=== Media recognition ===
She ranked 26th on CNN's 50 Most Powerful Women in Business 2006. In 2009, Forbes ranked her 24th in their list of the 100 Most Powerful Women. As of 2014, she is listed as the 76th most powerful woman in the world by Forbes.

== See also ==
- Zayre
