= HomeSense =

Canadian chain of discount home furnishing stores

- Type: Subsidiary
- Industry: Retail
- Founded: 2001; 25 years ago
- Headquarters: Framingham, Massachusetts, U.S.
- Number of locations: Canada - 139 (May 2, 2020) Europe - 78 (May 2, 2020) United States - 69 (October 2024) Total - 286
- Area served: Canada; Europe; United States
- Products: Bedding; furniture; housewares
- Parent: TJX
- Website: homesense.com

HomeSense (stylized as Homesense in Europe and the United States) is a Canadian chain of discount home furnishing stores owned by TJX. It originated in Canada in 2001, and was expanded to Europe in 2008 and the United States in 2017. Outside of the United States, the chain is comparable to the TJX-owned HomeGoods. Within the US, where HomeGoods already operates, it features more big ticket items than its sister store.

== History ==
=== Canadian operations ===
Since 2001 this brand operates in Canada, as of 2014, HomeSense holds over 100 stores including its "Mega-stores" which include full Winners and HomeSense stores combined. The Canadian chain is similar to TJX's HomeGoods chain in the United States.

HomeSense operates along with Winners and Marshalls in Canada both of which share common ownership by TJX.

Homesense specializes in home furnishings, selling products that range from low end to name brand. Prices tend to be competitive to account for minor defects or discontinued lines; however they also carry products that are in excellent condition. Some of their items can also be found in other department stores.

=== European operations ===
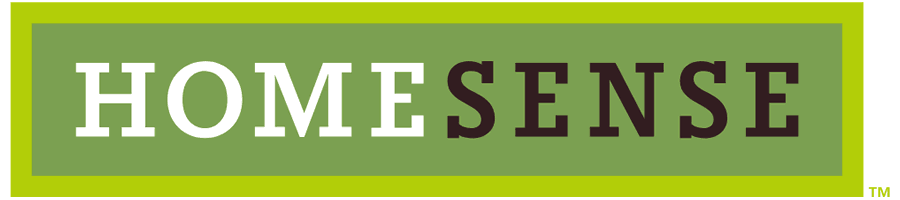
HomeSense logo used in the United States and Europe

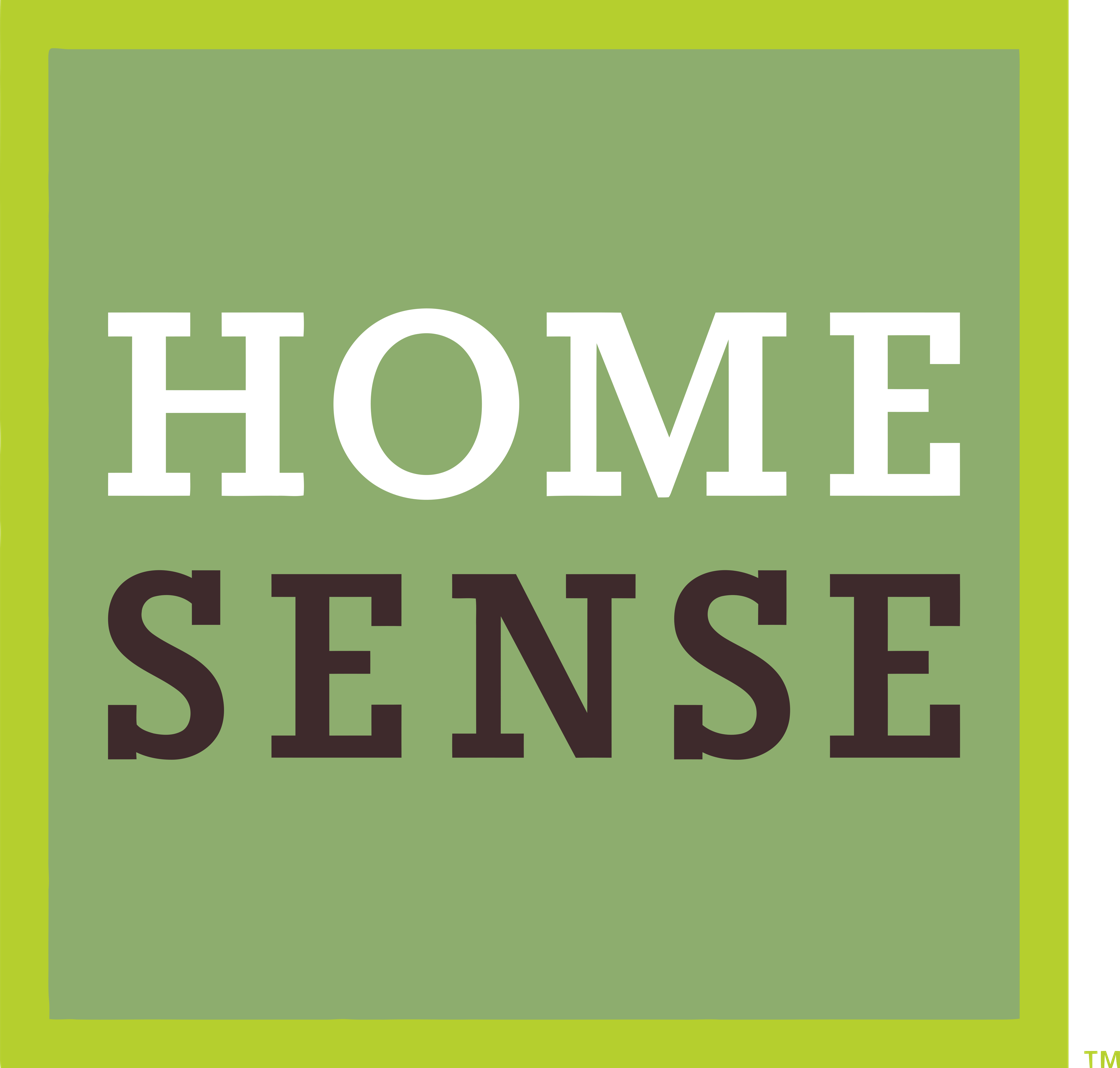
HomeSense logo variant used in the United States and Europe

In April 2008, TJX launched the HomeSense brand in the United Kingdom. The first store to open was in Poole, and this was closely followed by stores in Cardiff, Bristol, Gloucester, Northampton and Manchester followed by Thurrock in October 2008 and Cambridge in March 2009. By the end of 2009 HomeSense are operating 14 stores and have opened an additional 6 stores between August and November in Worcester, Birmingham, Preston, Romford, Staples Corner (London) and Nottingham. In 2010 HomeSense plans to open stores in Reading, Chichester, Tunbridge Wells, and Chester. The HomeSense flagship store is located in Westfield Merry Hill, Dudley, England, and opened in May 2010. In late-June 2026, it was announced that HomeSense's Westfield Merry Hill location in Dudley, England, would close permanently in early 2027.

Throughout April and May 2009, the original launch stores received minor refurbishments to bring design and decoration into line with newer stores. This coincided with a relaunch of the company's website, and the adoption of a new slogan, "It makes perfect HomeSense". Prior to this, the slogan was "Unique Finds, Irresistible Prices". The results of a customer survey completed in 2009 showed a 100% recommendation rate from customers, something which had been targeted prior to the brands launch. Staff aprons, the most distinctive part of the uniform, partially change on a seasonal basis.

As part of TJX Europe's 'Real Responsibility' initiative, HomeSense has partnered with the homeless charity Emmaus. As well as donating unsold stock, the company has started selling jute bags for £1.99, of which at least 50p is donated to Emmaus. In 2009, the company also started selling Fairtrade cotton bags for 99p. The company does not give out any bags free in order to reduce its environmental footprint. Plastic bags come in three sizes and customers are charged 10p for the medium and large sized bags and 15p for the extra large. The revenue gained is used to cover the cost of manufacturing the bags with any remaining sum donated to The Woodland Trust; HomeSense does not therefore profit from the sale of its plastic bags.

By the end of the financial year 2009/10 HomeSense estimates it will have sales of £270M, a 40% increase on the previous year. By the end of fiscal year 14 they expect to be one of the largest home and gift retailers in Europe.

HomeSense opened its first Irish stores in Dublin and Cork in June 2017.

=== American operations ===
HomeSense operates alongside and complements HomeGoods in the United States and so it differs from the original Canadian HomeSense stores and European locations. In the United States, HomeSense has a larger selection of furniture, art, and lighting from HomeGoods stores, and it even offers fixtures. Future plans for the chain include the addition of 400 more stores across the country.

HomeSense opened the first U.S. location in Framingham, Massachusetts in August 2017. Later that month, the company announced plans to open two additional stores in New Jersey in East Hanover and Seaview Square Shopping Center in Neptune. An additional Massachusetts location in Westwood opened on 9 November 2017. As of October 2024, HomeSense is operating in 69 locations across 16 U.S states and territories. Florida has the most stores currently at ten. Delaware, Ohio have the fewest number of stores at one in each state, both in Westlake, Ohio and Newark, Delaware. TJX, the parent company of HomeSense, as well as HomeGoods, Marshalls, Sierra, and TJ Maxx are slowly increasing their HomeSense presence in the United States. The HomeSense brand continues to open stores and expand at a slow pace opening stores each year.

== Gallery ==
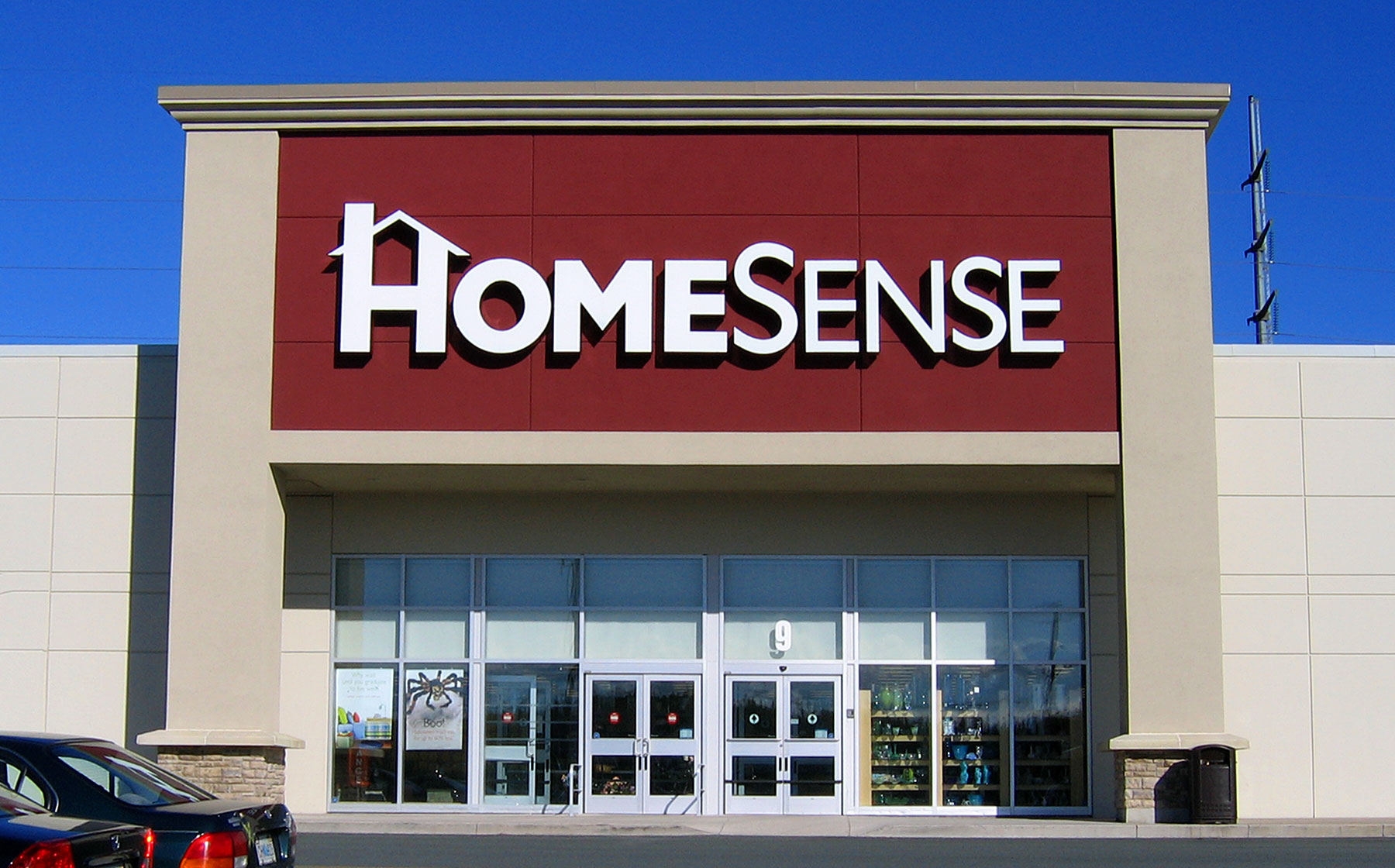
A store in Bayers Lake Business Park, Halifax, Nova Scotia, with the company's old logo used from 2001 to 2014

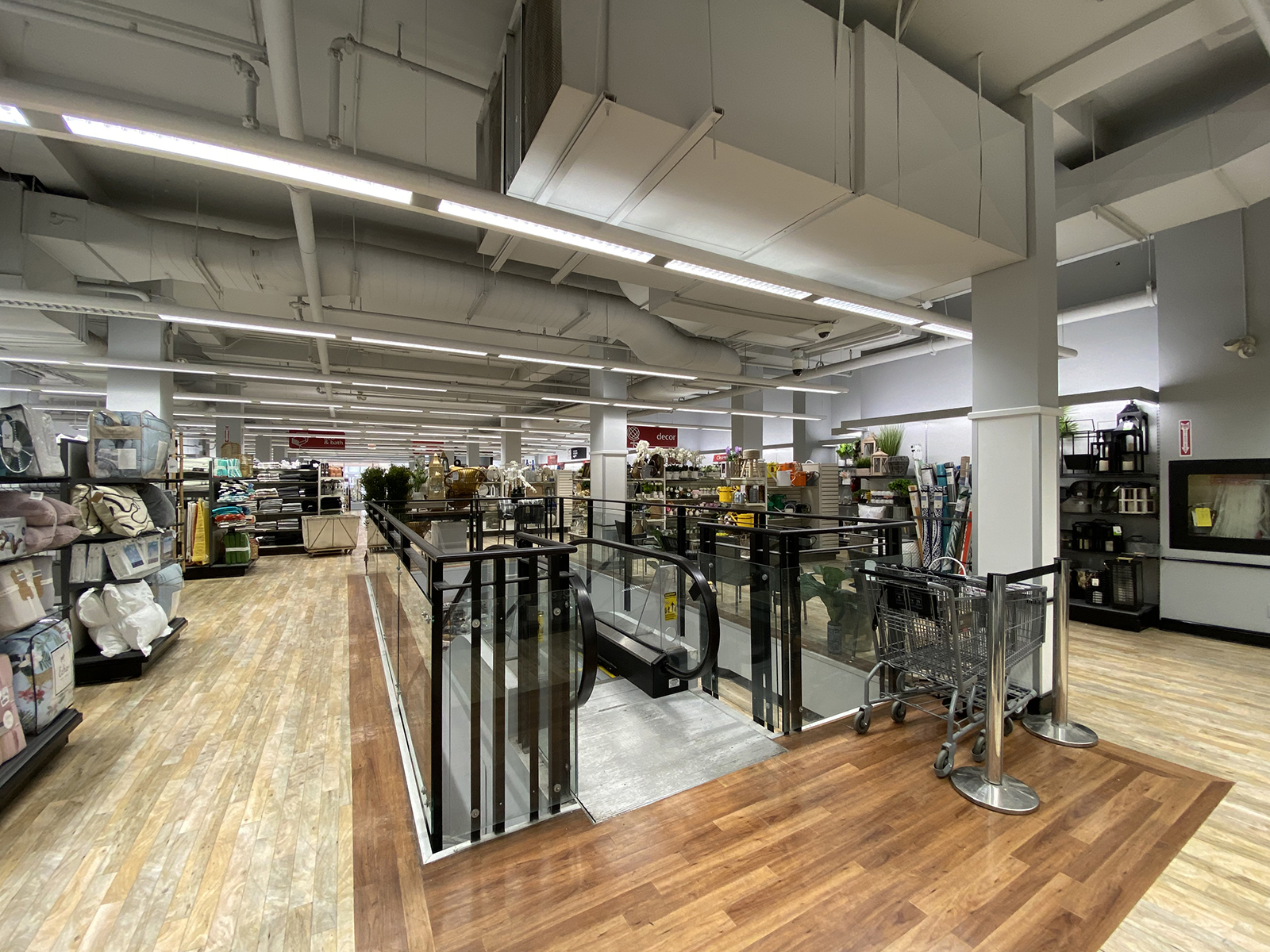
HomeSense in Downtown Toronto, Yonge Street

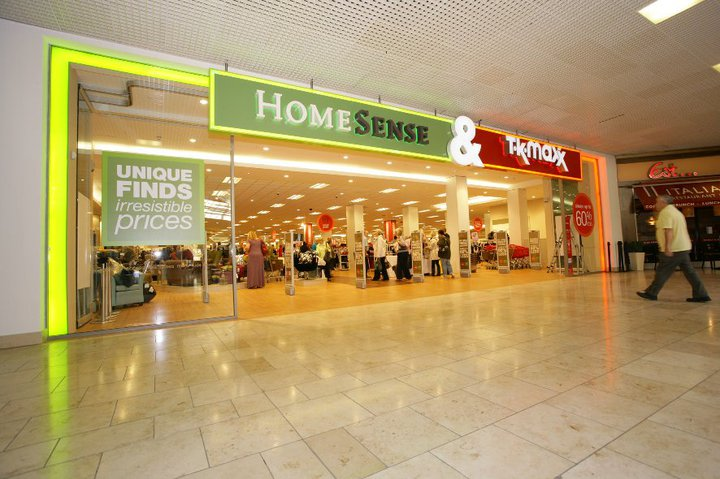
Homesense & TK Maxx joint store in the Metrocentre, Gateshead

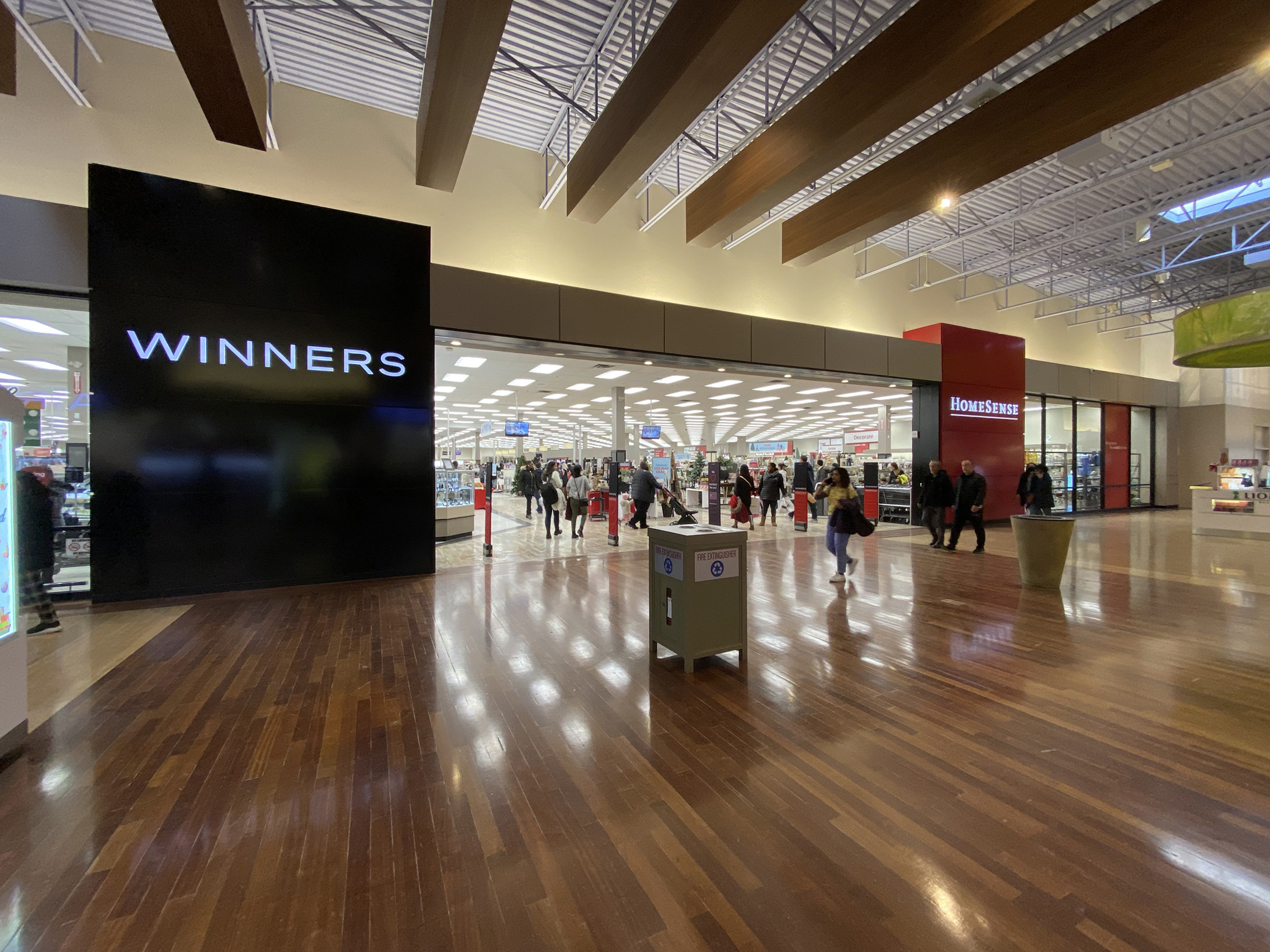
Homesense & Winners joint store in the Vaughan Mills, Ontario, Canada

== See also ==
- TJX
- T.J.Maxx
- HomeGoods
- Winners
