= Winners =

Canadian department store chain

Winners Merchants International L.P.

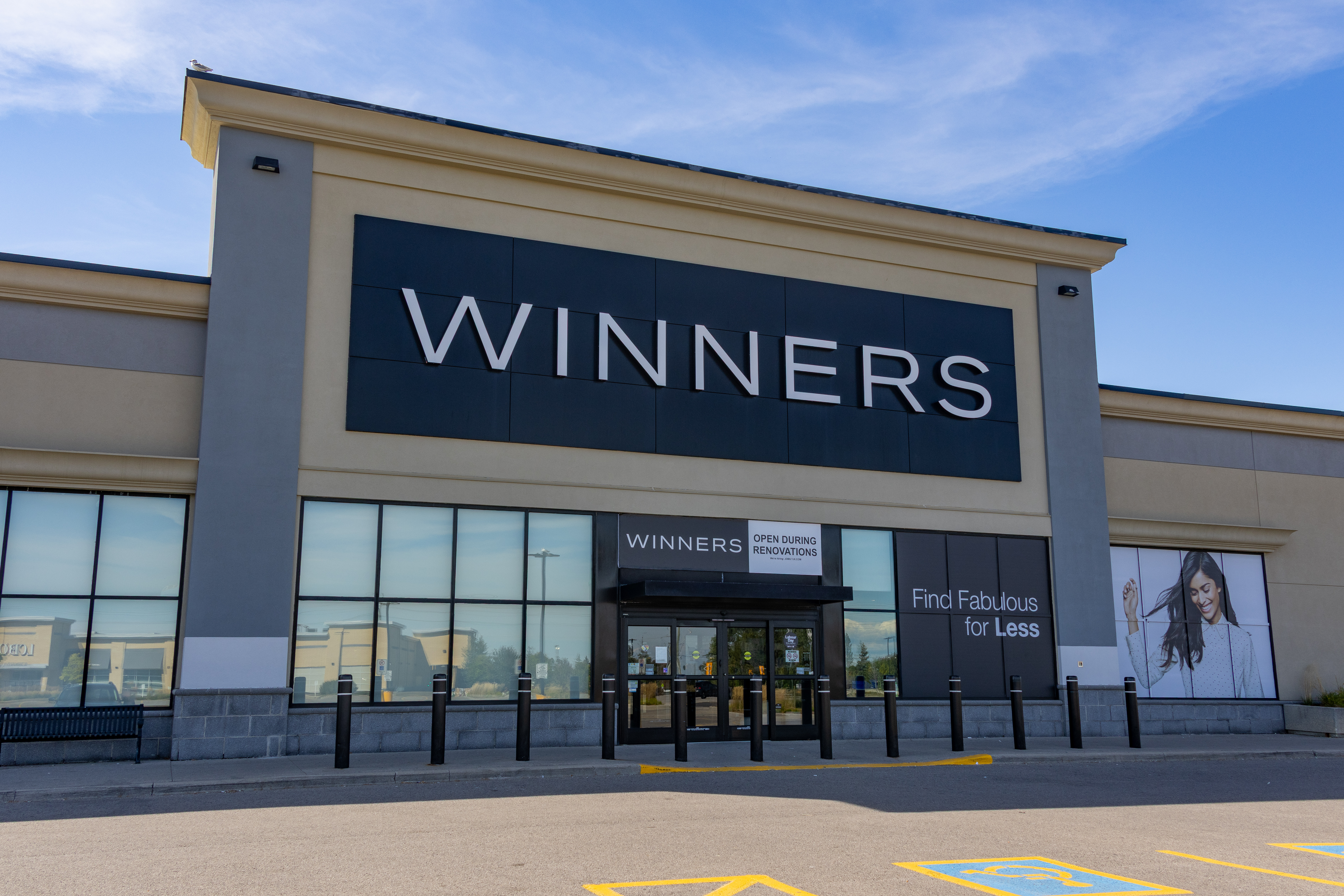
- Type: Subsidiary
- Industry: Retail
- Founded: 1982; 44 years ago
- Founder: David Margolis
- Headquarters: 60 Standish Court Mississauga, Ontario L5R 0G1
- Number of locations: 319
- Area served: Canada
- Products: Clothing, fashion accessories, beauty products, footwear, and home décor
- Parent: TJX (1990–present)
- Website: winners.ca

Winners Merchants International L.P. is a chain of discount Canadian department stores owned by TJX. Its market niche is similar to the American chain TJ Maxx, and it is a partnered retailer to department stores HomeSense and Marshalls.

== History and format ==
Winners logo from 1982 to 2005

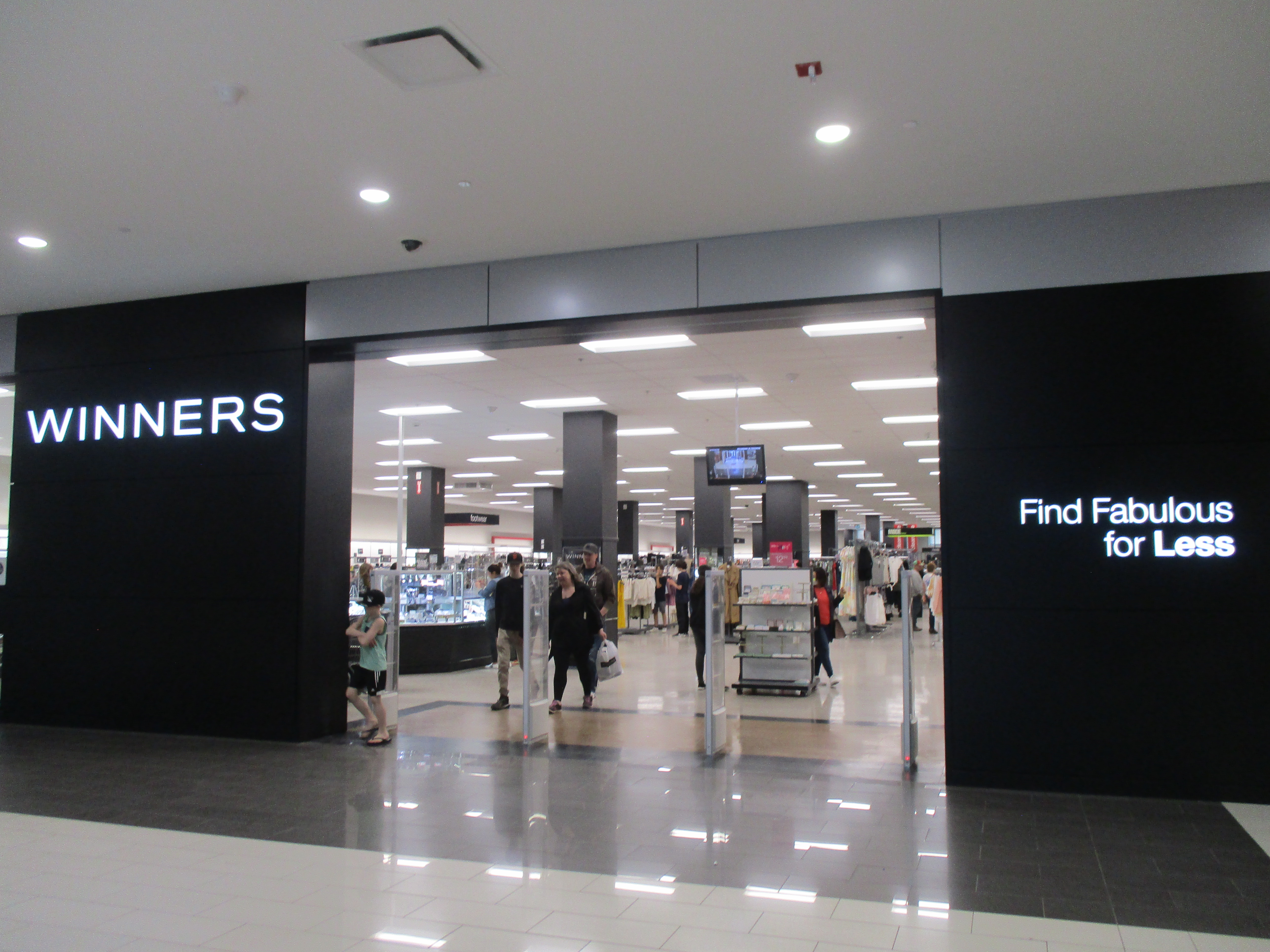
Winners at Southcentre Mall in Calgary, Alberta

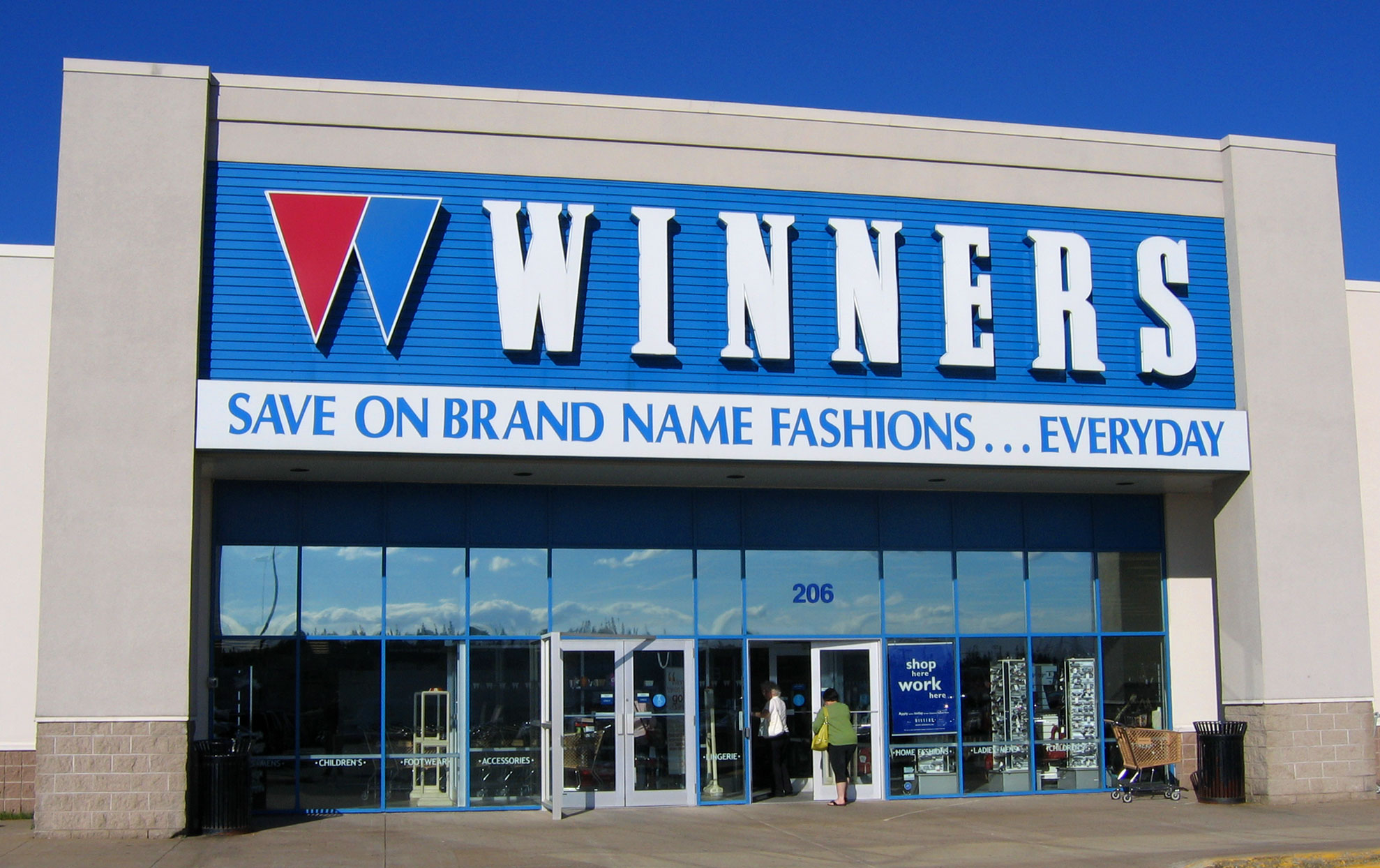
Winners store in Bayers Lake Business Park with 1980s logo

Winners was founded in 1982 by David Margolis in Toronto, Ontario. It was one of the first off-price department stores in Canada. In 1990, it merged with off-price department store owner TJX. By the time of its acquisition by TJX in June 1990, Winners had five stores in the country, all of which were in the Toronto area. Except for the store on Spadina Avenue that closed in 2018, all of these Winners are still in operation (either in their original or relocated spaces).

Winners offers brand-name clothing, footwear, bedding, furniture, fine jewelry, beauty products, and housewares. Products are at a 20-60% discount rate, and the stores generally do not carry the same merchandise for an entire season. The discounts are in large part due to the company buying excess or end-of-season merchandise from other stores, as well as its connections with TJ Maxx. The firm does not sell online.

Since late 2001, Winners stores have been paired with HomeSense, a home accessory retailer, modelled on TJX's American HomeGoods stores. Winners acquired the struggling "Labels" brand from Dylex in 2001. Labels had been meant to compete with Winners, but never succeeded; most of its stores have been turned into Homesense stores.

Les Ailes de la Mode opened a similar concept under the Labels banner after Winners did not renew its trademark on the name.

== Controversy ==
In 2016, CBC Television's Marketplace investigated Winners' "compared at" pricing and found that retail price of the manufacture could be misleading and inaccurate. For example, one pair of pants was "on sale for $29.99, with a 'compare at' price of $80, or more than 60 per cent off. But next to the tag [was] another tag with the manufacturer's suggested retail price: $29.99, the same amount that Winners was charging."

Winners responded by defending their "compared at" prices as accurate and fair, but acknowledged that "sometimes errors can occur" due to the volume of merchandise received by stores. In a follow-up letter to Marketplace, Winners was able to verify every "compared at" price for 20 of the 21 items that Marketplace had investigated, by finding the items at the "compared at" prices at a comparable retailer. For the remaining item, Winners admitted that it was an error on their part and pledged to fix the mismatch.

== See also ==
- List of Canadian department stores
