= Sierra (retailer) =

American off-price retailer

Sierra Trading Post, Inc.

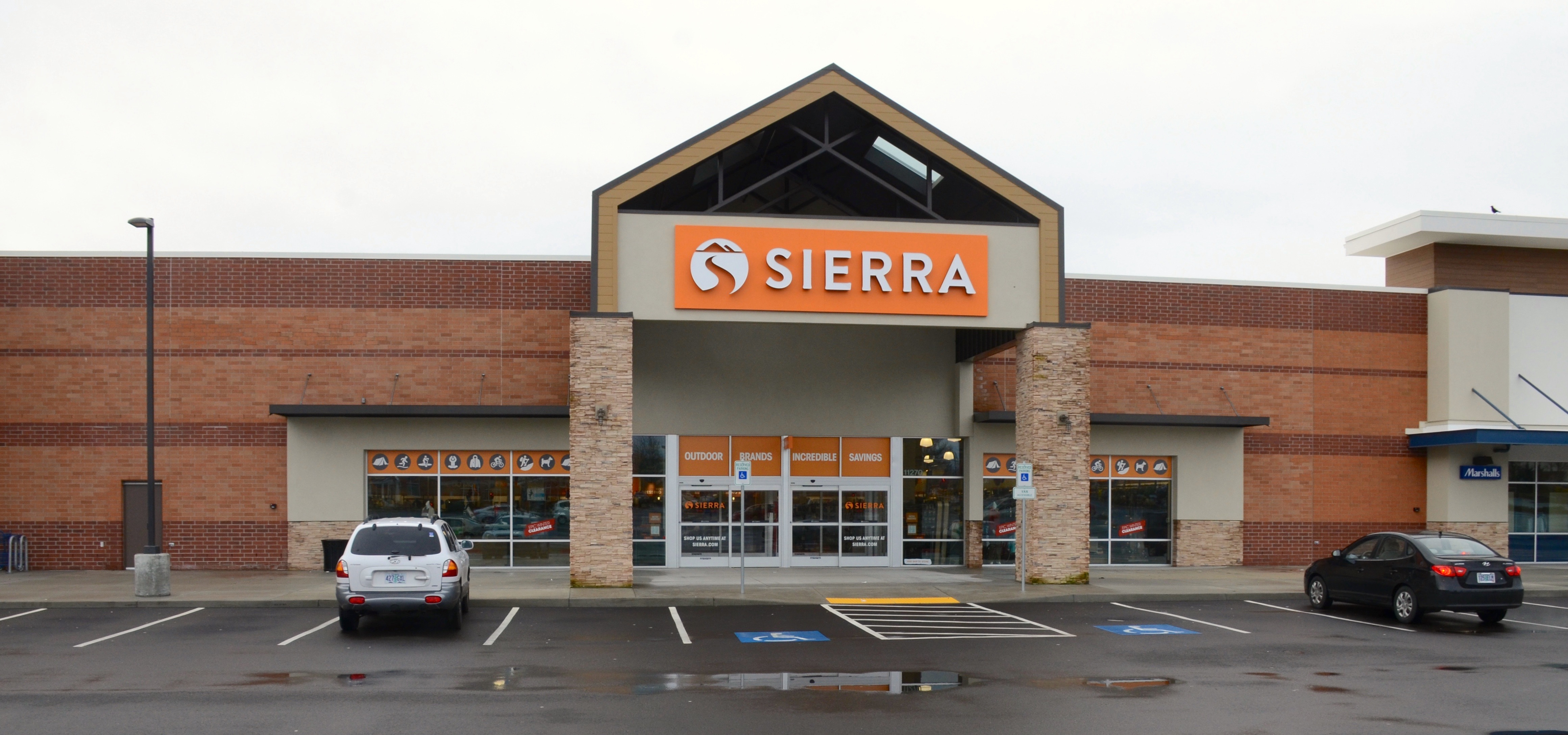
- A Sierra store in Oregon in 2019
- Trade name: Sierra
- Formerly: Sierra Trading Post (1986–2019) (Note: The chain still trades as Sierra Trading Post, Inc., but now simply goes by Sierra)
- Type: Subsidiary
- Industry: Retail
- Founded: 1986; 40 years ago in Reno, Nevada
- Headquarters: Framingham, Massachusetts, U.S. 41°7′33.64″N 104°44′55.44″W
- Number of locations: 145 (January 2026)
- Products: Outdoor recreation, fitness and adventure gear, apparel, footwear, clothing, home décor
- Parent: TJX (2012–present)
- Website: www.sierra.com

Sierra Trading Post, Inc., doing business as Sierra, is an online and brick-and-mortar retailer of off-price merchandise operated by TJX. The Framingham, Massachusetts–based company offers products in categories such as outdoor recreation, fitness and adventure gear, and apparel, along with footwear, clothing, and home decor. Sierra sells merchandise through 78 retail stores as of November 2022 and a company website. It carries products from approximately 3,000 name-brand manufacturers.

Sierratradingpost.com launched in December 1998 and was included in the "Internet Retailer Top 400 List" in 2004 and the "Top 500 List" in 2005, 2006, 2007, 2010 and 2011.

== History ==
Sierra Trading Post was founded in Reno, Nevada, in 1986, and headquartered there until 1992. The original company had 500 square feet (46 m^{2}) of office space. The existing stores average 18,000 sq ft (1,700 m^{2}) of operating space.

On January 12, 2009, as a result of the 2008 financial crisis, the company laid off approximately 130 employees at the retail and outlet store (and fulfillment center) in Cheyenne.

It was acquired for an estimated $200 million (€155,666,252) by Framingham, Massachusetts–based TJX in December 2012. TJX subsequently shortened the name "Sierra Trading Post" to Sierra.

== Catalogs ==
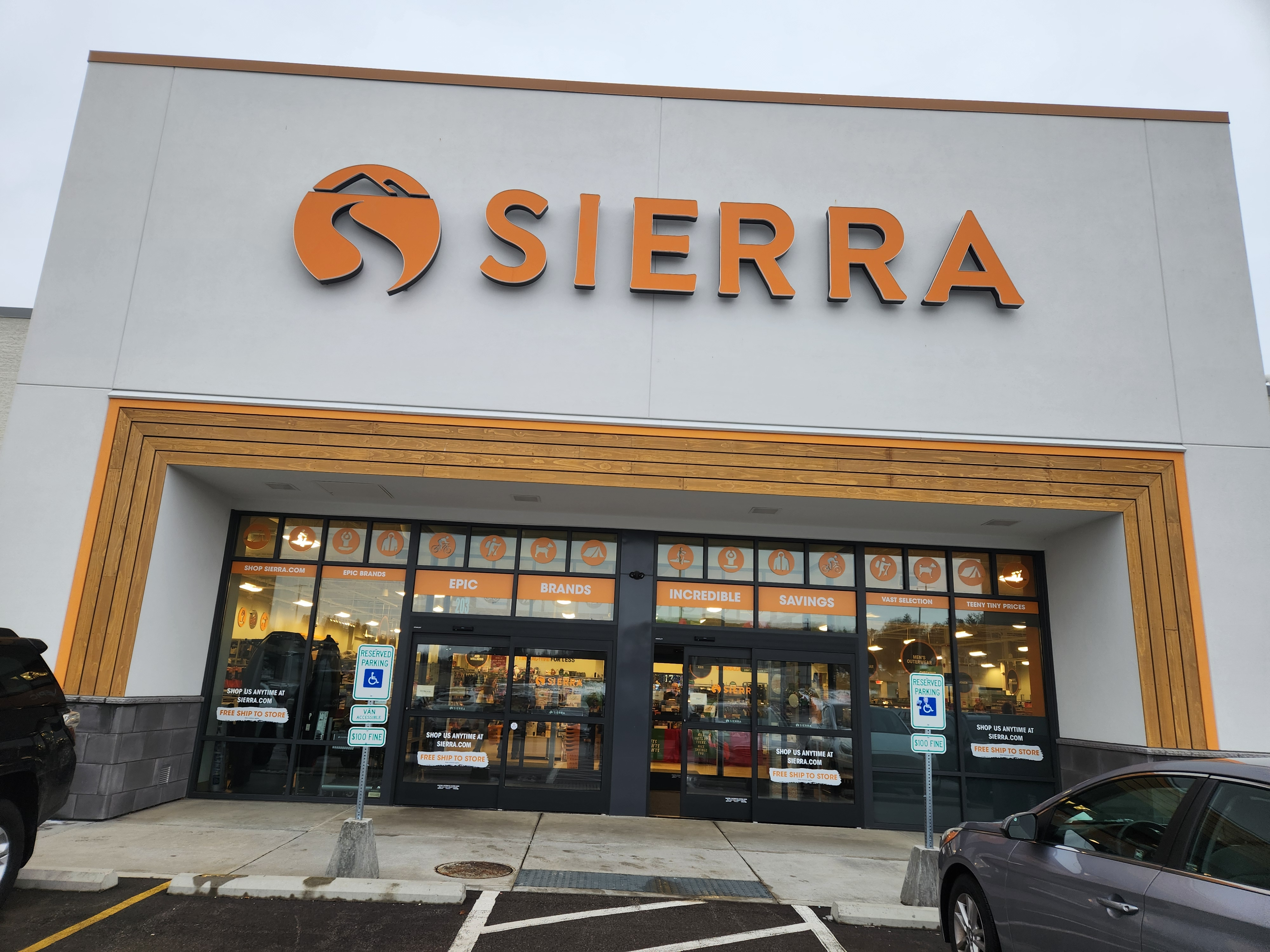
A Sierra store in Erie, PA in 2025

The first catalog had 16 pages of hand-drawn merchandise printed in duotone. As of December 2017, the catalog is no longer in production.

== Retail stores ==
The company operates brick-and-mortar stores in the United States. As a part of the TJX group of companies, a store is often near or within a HomeGoods, T.J. Maxx or Marshalls store in the same shopping center.

In April 2025, Sierra opened its first California store in South Lake Tahoe.
