= TK Maxx =

International discount department store chain owned by TJX

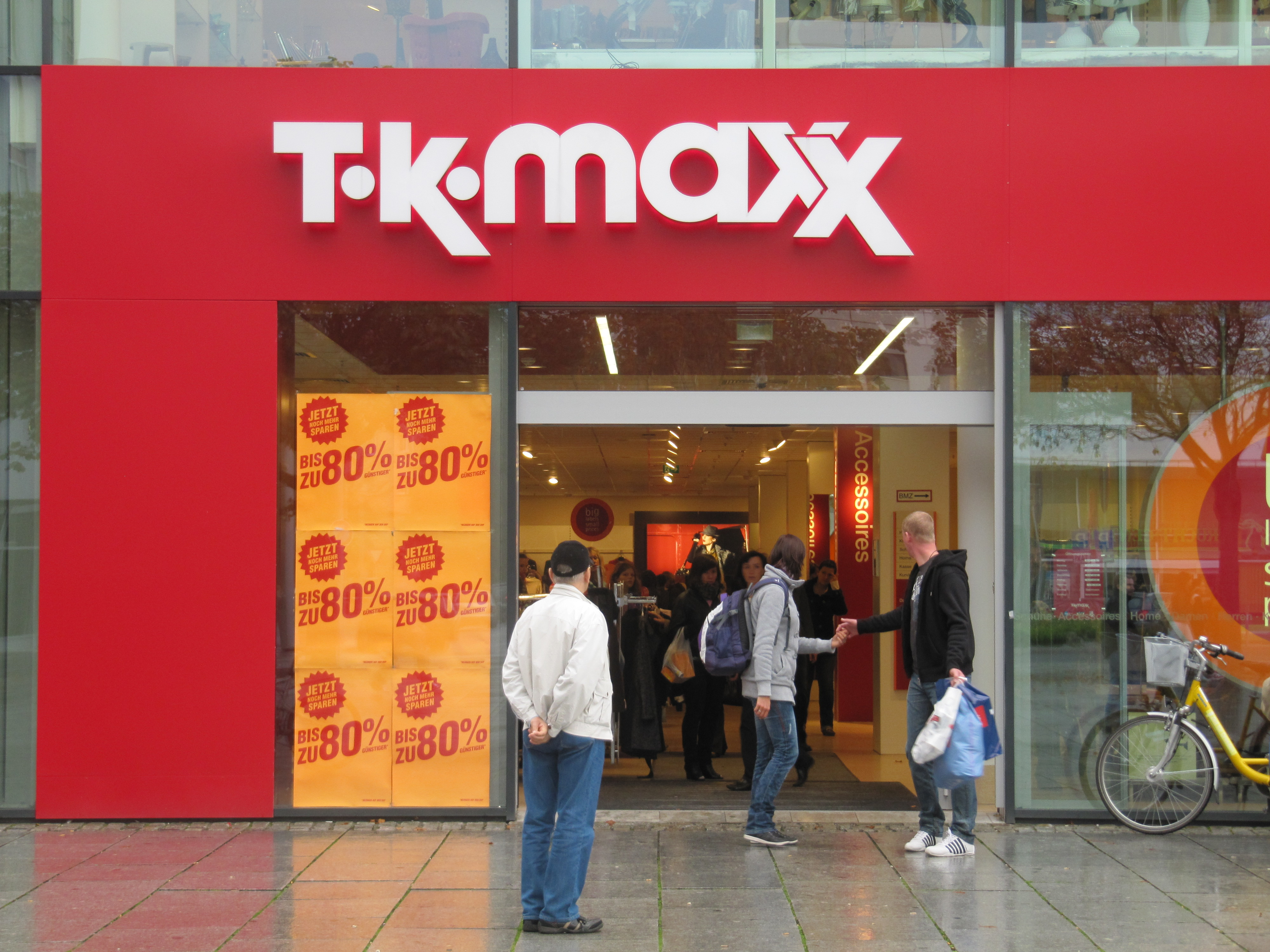
- TK Maxx in Prager Straße, Dresden
- Type: Subsidiary
- Industry: Retail
- Founded: 1976; 50 years ago
- Founder: Bernard Cammarata
- Headquarters: Watford, United Kingdom
- Number of locations: Europe: 596 (2 May 2020); Australia: 56 (2 May 2020); Total: 652 (2 May 2020)
- Area served: United Kingdom; Australia; Ireland; Germany; Poland; Austria; Netherlands; Spain
- Products: Clothing, footwear, bedding and domestics, furniture and giftware
- Parent: TJX
- Website: www.tkmaxx.com

TK Maxx (stylised as T•K•maxx) is a discount clothing and homewares retailer, that opened in the UK in 1994. It is currently based in Watford, England. It is owned by American retailer TJ Maxx, which could not trade under the initials "TJ" in the UK due to the British discount chain TJ Hughes.

TK Maxx is an off price retailer that purchases stock when opportunities arise, rather than purchasing seasonally, in advance. This results in the company stocking a large number of brands, with products changing frequently, and being sold at lower prices. TK Maxx has expanded across Ireland, the Netherlands, Germany, Austria, Poland and Australia, and also trades as Homesense.

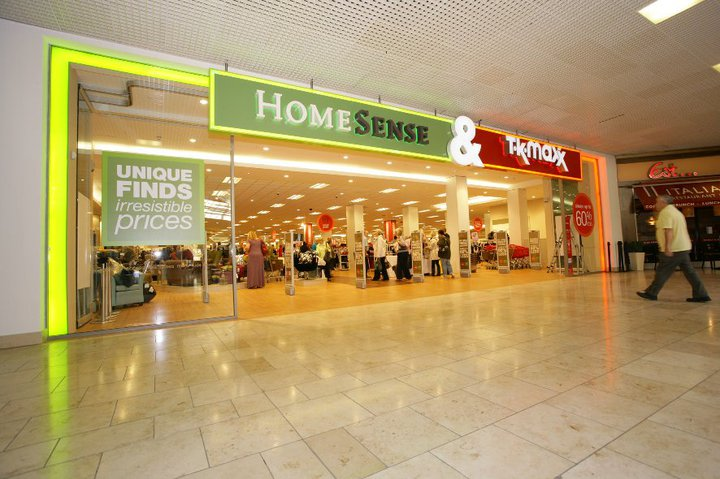
HomeSense and TK Maxx joint store in the MetroCentre, Gateshead

== History ==
In 1976, TJ Maxx was founded in Framingham, Massachusetts, United States, by Bernard Cammarata. The first international store opened in Bristol, UK, in 1994. The company modified the name to TK Maxx to avoid confusion with the unrelated British retail chain TJ Hughes.

Opening of stores in the Netherlands between 1999 and 2001 was not as successful as the company wished. The first store in Germany opened on October 4, 2007, in Lübeck.

The company opened larger "Maxx Maxx" stores to attempt to move from a budget reputation and become more like a department store. In August 2008, TK Maxx opened a store on Kensington High Street, London, England, its first central London store, on a site formerly occupied by Habitat.

In 2009, TK Maxx was denied permission by the Crown Estate to open a store in a unit on its land at Piccadilly Circus, London. In February that year, the company had signed a deal with the leaseholder of the unit, a 20,000-square-foot (1,858 m^{2}) vacant site formerly used by Virgin Megastores, with a rent of £1.55 million per year. The Crown Estate rejected TK Maxx, saying it did not fit its upmarket development strategy for the area. In response, publicist Max Clifford and Look magazine launched a campaign in support of a TK Maxx store on the site. A court appeal by TK Maxx against the decision failed.

In March 2009, the TK Maxx e-commerce site was launched, initially selling only handbags, but later also selling other accessories. Three stores were opened in Poland in autumn 2009 with the company having a total 252 stores across Europe, with further expansion planned.

In October 2015, the company opened a store in Eindhoven, in the Netherlands, followed by more stores. In April 2017, the brand was launched in Australia, when it took over the thirty five Trade Secret discount department stores. The stores opened in April in Brisbane, Sydney and Melbourne with stores in Cairns, Townsville, Toowoomba, Canberra, Newcastle, Wollongong, Albury, the Sunshine Coast and the Gold Coast by the end of May. Its first Tasmanian store opened in June 2023 at Northgate Shopping Centre in Hobart.

In March 2026, the first Spanish store opened in Barcelona's Diagonal Mar shopping centre.

== Charity support ==
=== United Kingdom ===
In 2007 and 2009, TK Maxx in the UK was the sole retailer of Red Nose Day T-shirts, sales of which generated £2 million in 2007 and £3 million in 2009 for Comic Relief.

TK Maxx has been a supporter of the Woodland Trust since 2004, when it held a Christmas card recycling scheme in conjunction with the Trust.

From August 2008, TK Maxx introduced charges on plastic carrier bags and donated the proceeds to the Woodland Trust, which used the funds to plant 30,000 new trees on a 15-acre (60,703 m^{2}) site near Elmstead Market, Essex. This was before the 2015 phase-out of plastic bags in the UK, in which charges became mandatory and are now frequently donated to charity.

TK Maxx also runs a 'Give Up Clothes For Good' campaign, where customers are encouraged to bring in unwanted clothes for Cancer Research UK.

=== Ireland ===
In Ireland, TK Maxx actively supports Enable Ireland, a charity which helps provide free services to children with disabilities.

== Gallery ==
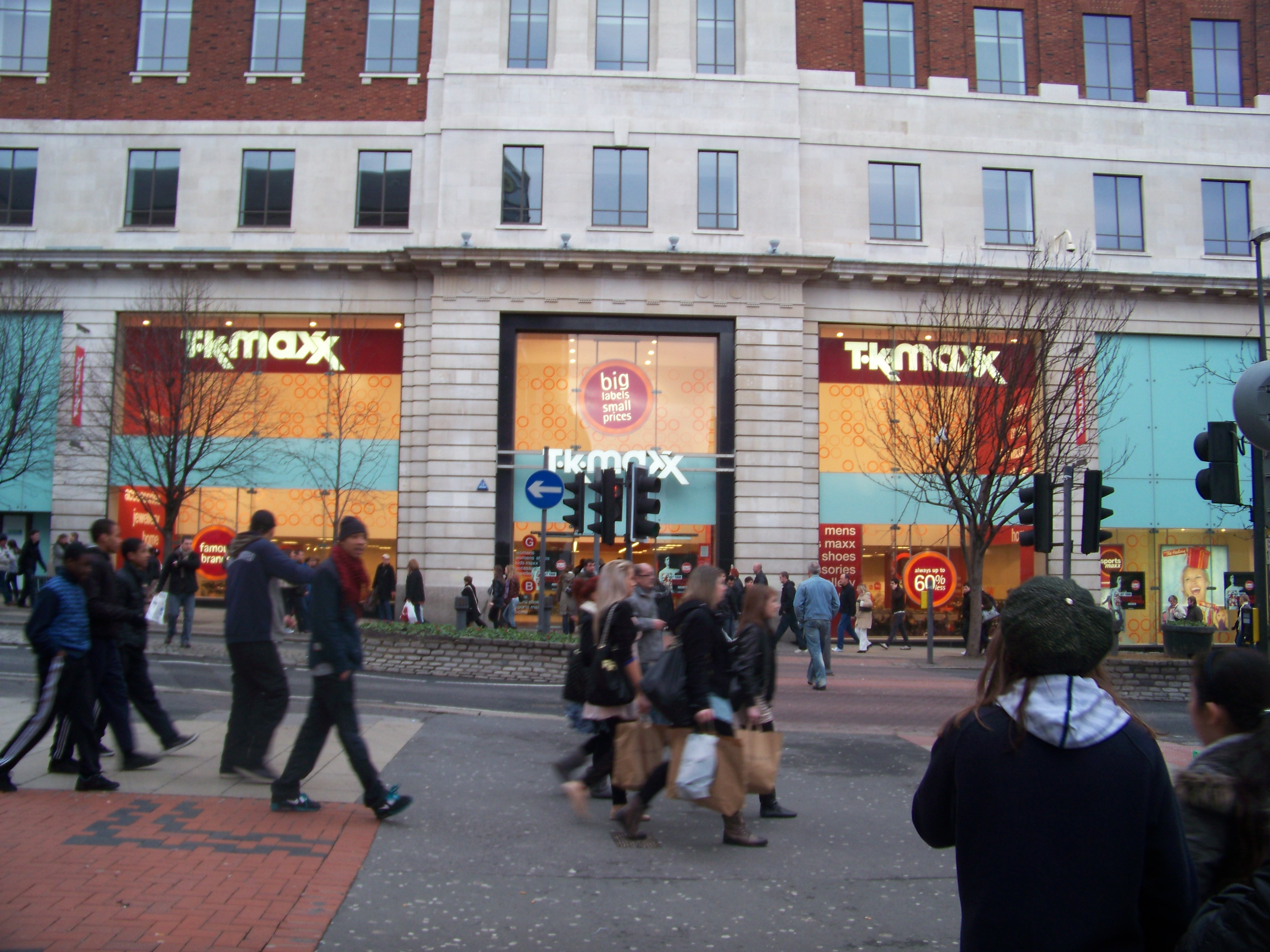
TK Maxx on The Headrow in Leeds

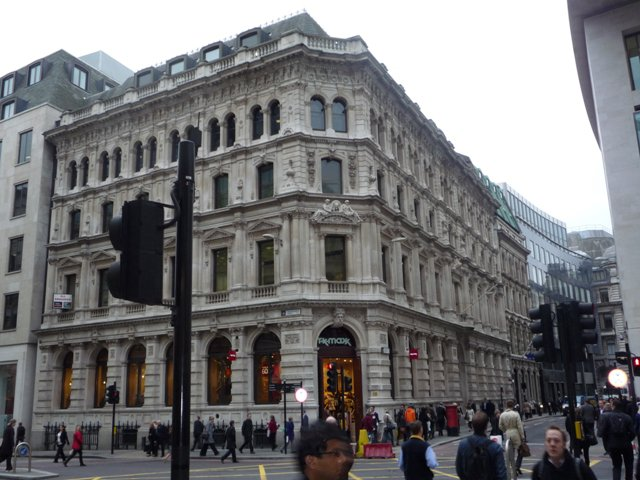
TK Maxx on Gracechurch Street, London

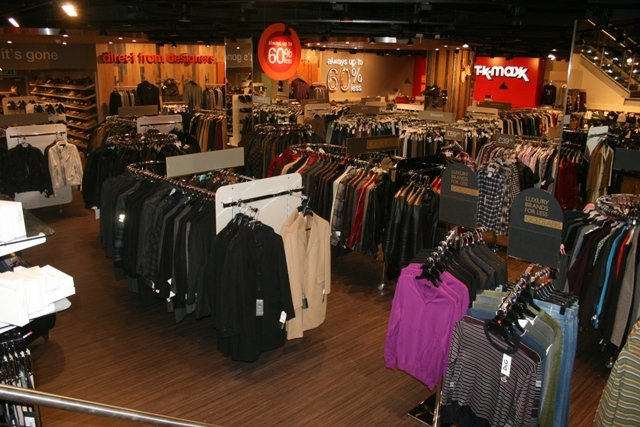
Interior of TK Maxx on Gracechurch Street, London

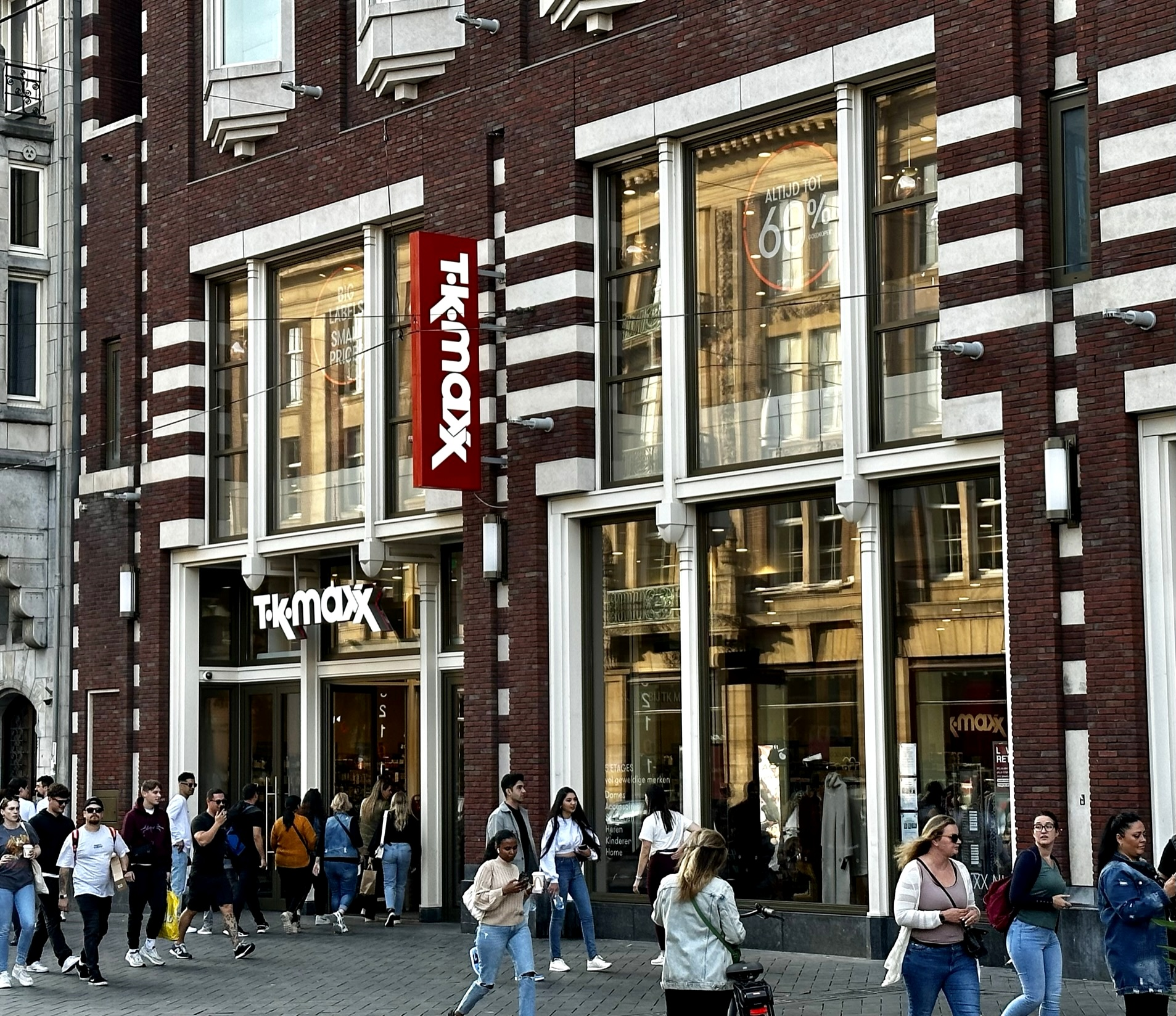
TK Maxx on Damrak, Amsterdam

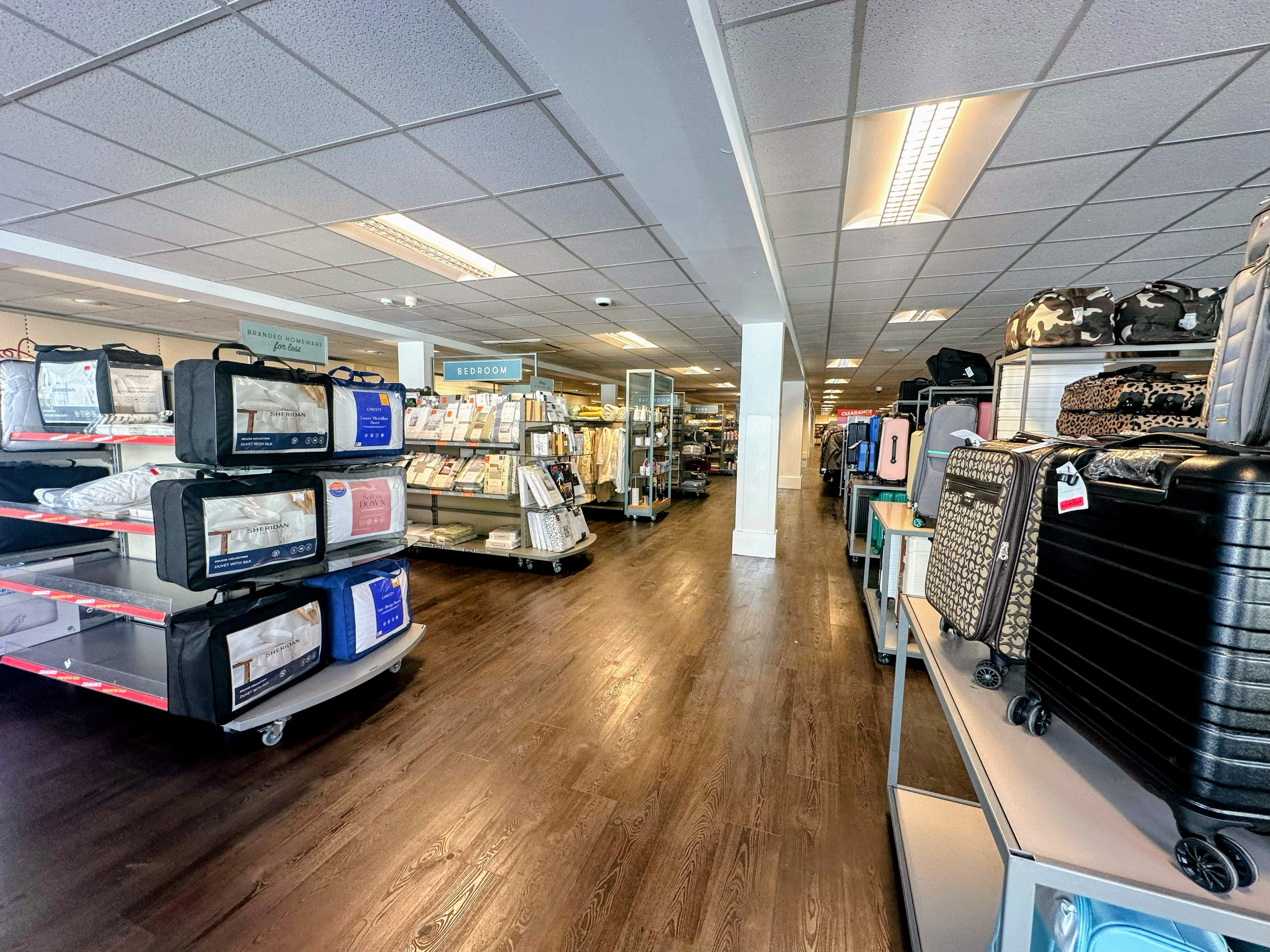
Interior of TK Maxx in Chatham, Kent

== See also ==
- List of department stores in Europe
