= HomeGoods =

American chain of home furnishing stores

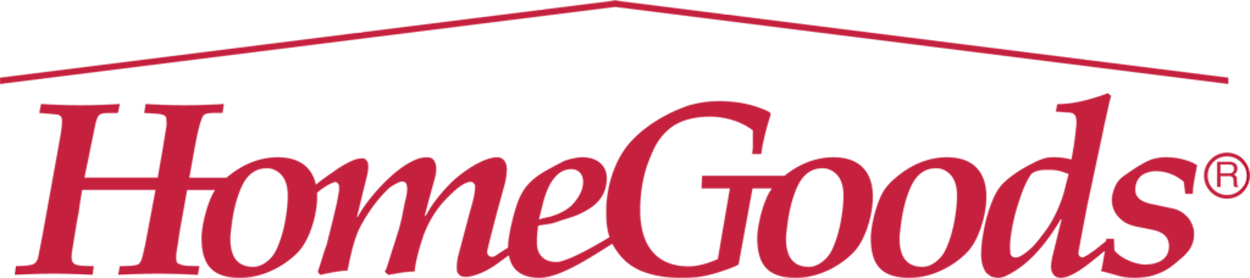

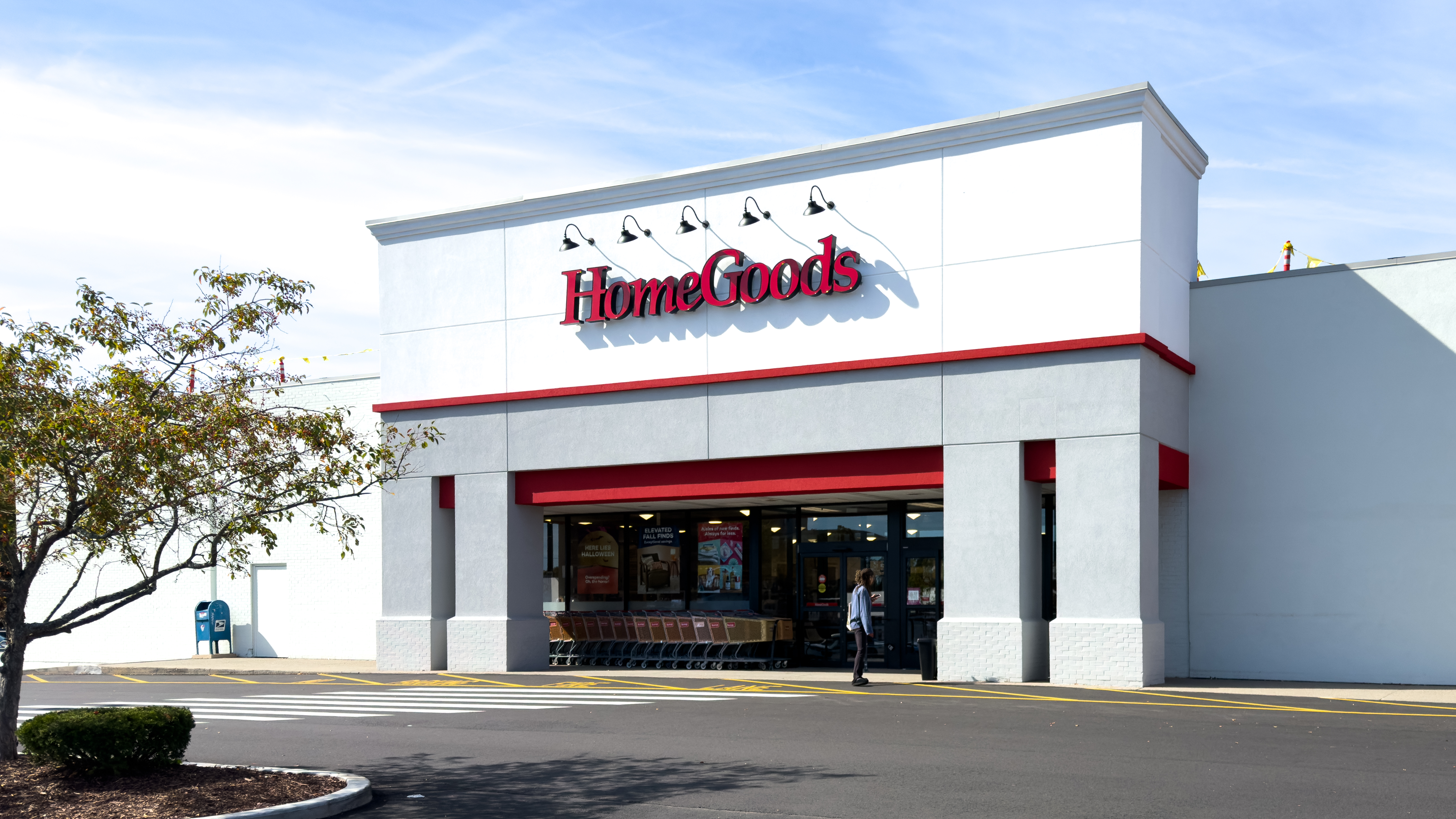
- HomeGoods store in Norwalk, Connecticut
- Type: Subsidiary
- Industry: Retail
- Founded: 1992; 34 years ago
- Headquarters: Framingham, Massachusetts, U.S.
- Number of locations: 914 (January 11, 2024)
- Products: Bedding, furniture, housewares, lighting
- Parent: TJX
- Website: www.homegoods.com

HomeGoods is a chain of home furnishing stores headquartered in Framingham, Massachusetts. HomeGoods sells furniture, linens, cooking products, art, and other home accessories.

HomeGoods is owned by TJX and is a sister company to T.J. Maxx, Sierra Trading Post, and Marshalls. The size of each store varies by location. There are locations in the United States that combine both the HomeGoods and the T.J. Maxx or Marshalls store brands in one building.

== History ==
HomeGoods was founded in 1992 by TJX, the parent company of TJ Maxx. The chain offers off-price home furniture and decor. Ben Cammarata, then president of TJ Maxx, stated that the company wanted to create a spin-off chain specializing in home decor due to favorable sales of such merchandise at TJ Maxx locations. Additionally, TJ Maxx held leases on a number of former Ames Department Stores which had been converted from Zayre, the former parent company of TJ Maxx, and was seeking a new store concept to fill the vacated stores. The first HomeGoods opened on May 7, 1992 in a former Ames at the Quarry Square shopping center in Milford, Massachusetts.

In Canada and Europe, the parent company of HomeGoods operates a similar home furnishing chain called HomeSense. In August 2017, TJX announced the opening of about 400 HomeSense stores across America.

HomeGoods has an associated app called "HomeGoods" which allows customers to find locations near them, manage gift cards, manage their TJX Rewards Credit Card rewards and bill.

As of October 21, 2023, HomeGoods no longer offers online shopping through their website.
