= BJ's Wholesale Club =

American membership-only warehouse club chain

BJ's Wholesale Club Holdings, Inc.
- Type: Public
- Traded as: NYSE: BJ; S&P 400 component; Russell 1000 component
- Industry: Retailing (Warehouse club)
- Founded: February 6, 1984; 42 years ago
- Headquarters: Marlborough, Massachusetts, United States
- Number of locations: 250 warehouse clubs; 186 gas stations (2025)
- Area served: Connecticut; Delaware; Florida; Georgia; Kentucky Maine; Maryland; Massachusetts; Michigan; New Hampshire; New Jersey; New York; North Carolina; South Carolina; Ohio; Pennsylvania; Rhode Island; Tennessee; Texas; Virginia
- Key people: Bob Eddy (CEO)
- Products: Electronics, Home, Furniture, Outdoor, Sporting Goods, Toys, Jewelry, Clothing, Health and Beauty, Grocery.
- Revenue: ▲US$20.5 billion (2025)
- Operating income: ▼US$772 million (2025)
- Net income: ▲US$534 million (2025)
- Total assets: ▲US$7.065 billion (2025)
- Total equity: ▲US$1.847 billion (2025)
- Number of employees: 33,000 (2025)
- Website: www.bjs.com

BJ's Wholesale Club Holdings, Inc., commonly referred as BJ's, is an American regional membership-only warehouse club chain based in Marlborough, Massachusetts, largely operating in the eastern United States as well as Texas. Its major competitors are Costco Wholesale and Sam's Club.

== History ==
The company was started by discount department store chain Zayre in 1984, on the Medford/Malden border in Massachusetts. The company's name was derived from the initials of Beverly Jean Weich, the daughter of Mervyn Weich, the president of the new company. Weich announced his resignation as president in June 1987, and left on August 1. He was replaced by John Levy.

When Zayre Corporation sold the Zayre nameplate to rival discount chain Ames in October 1988, TJX was formed. In 1989, TJX spun off their warehouse division, consisting of BJ's and now-defunct HomeClub (later known as HomeBase, then House2Home), to form Waban, Inc. In August 1997, Waban spun off BJ's to become an independent company, BJ's Wholesale Club, Inc., headquartered in Natick, Massachusetts, while Waban renamed itself to HomeBase, Inc.

In 2011, BJ's was acquired by two private equity firms, Leonard Green & Partners and CVC Capital Partners. It returned to being a public company in 2018.

In 2019, BJ's expanded into Michigan, with a new store in Madison Heights. A second and a third Michigan location have since opened in Taylor and Chesterfield Township, respectively. BJ's has also since opened locations in Canton and Lansing.

=== Today ===
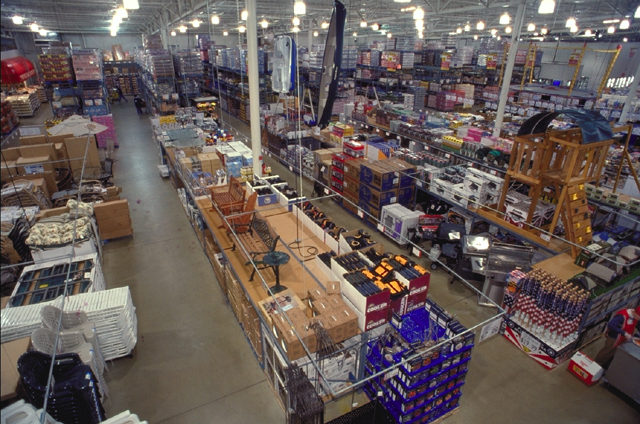
BJ's Wholesale Club in Virginia

Many of BJ's clubs offer special services to members, such as car rentals, gas stations, home heating oil, an optical department, propane filling, and vacation packages. These services vary from location to location. As of 2008, there were 154 clubs with optical departments. As of January 30, 2010 BJ's operated 104 gasoline stations at their clubs. In February 2007, BJ's closed all pharmacies in its clubs.

In March 2010, BJ's announced they would move their corporate headquarters from Natick to Westborough, Massachusetts in 2011. On January 5, 2011, BJ's announced it would close five underperforming stores in the Southeast, eliminate approximately 100 headquarters jobs by the end of the month, and restructure its home office and some field operations. Its restructuring moves would result in savings of 78 to 82 cents per share for its fiscal fourth quarter.

On December 19, 2019, BJ's named Lee Delaney as its next CEO starting February 2, 2020. Delaney had been an executive vice president and chief growth officer of the company since 2016. Then CEO Chris Baldwin became executive chairman. Following Delaney's death on April 8, 2021, BJ's financial chief Bob Eddy took over as interim CEO. On April 20, 2021, Bob Eddy's interim status was removed and he was given the permanent CEO position.

In November 2021, BJ's announced plans for its first store in Tennessee, to be located in La Vergne, a suburb of Nashville. The store opened on June 14, 2023. The company has announced plans for at least two additional stores in the Nashville market, with confirmed locations being added in Goodlettsville and Mt. Juliet.

In October 2025, BJ's had announced it was proposing to building a BJ's Car Wash at its current store location in Southington, Connecticut. It would become the first in the state of Connecticut and the company.

In May 2026, BJ’s opened its first four Texas clubs in Forney, Waxahatchie, Grand Prairie and Fort Worth. An additional club in Mesquite (near Dallas) began construction that May. The company has purchased land in Tyler, Texas with plans for a sixth store. The company announced it plans to begin opening 25-30 store throughout Texas beginning in 2027.

== Locations ==
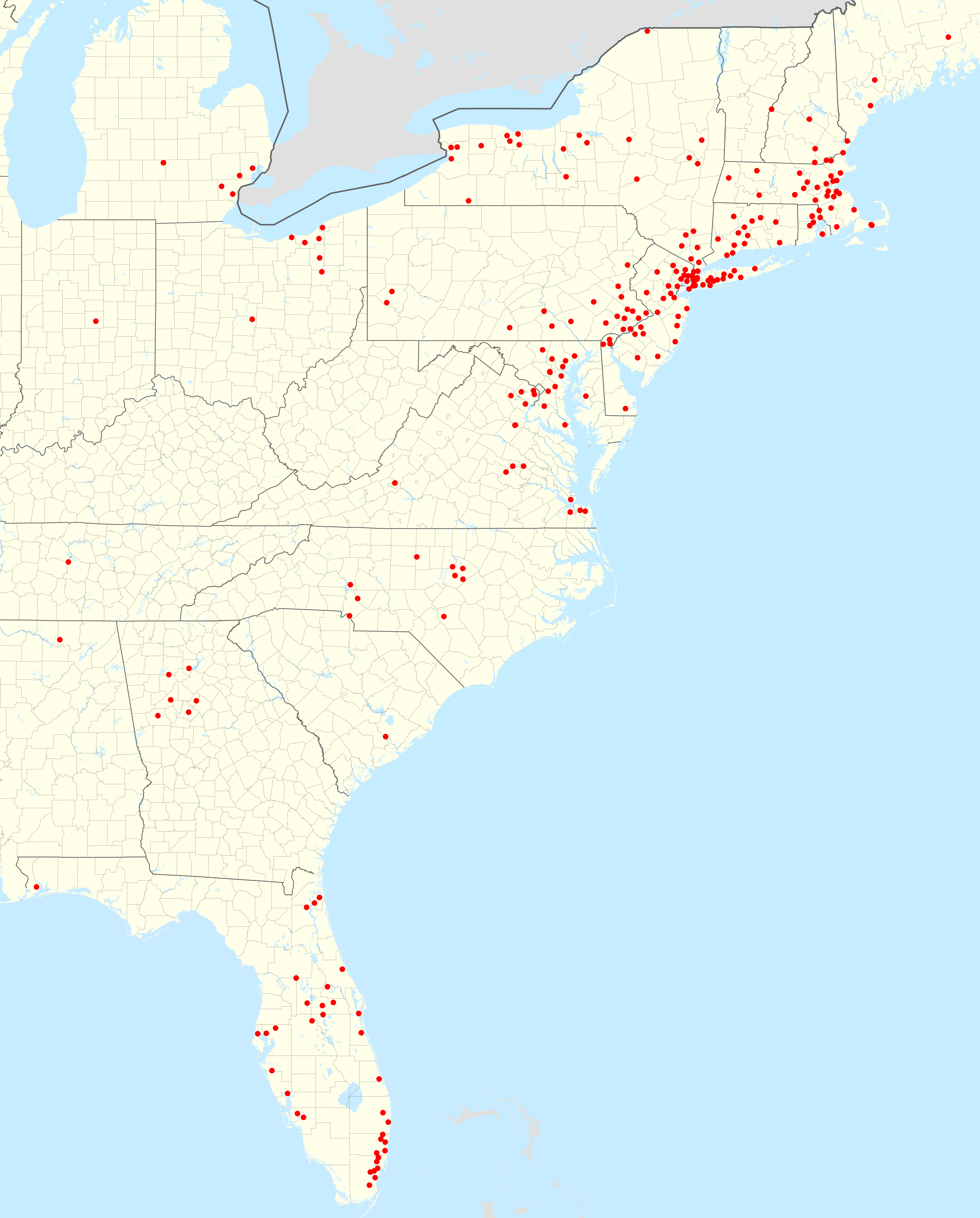
Map of BJ's locations as of March 2023.

As of May 2025, BJ's operates 250 BJ's clubs in 21 states and employed approximately 25,000 team members (both full- and part-time). BJ's uses three cross-dock distribution centers along with third-party warehouse space when extra storage is needed.

=== Operations ===
Many of these business operations are located at the club locations.

- BJ's Wholesale Club
  - 250 locations
- BJ's Gas Station
  - 186 locations
- BJ's Car Wash
  - 1 location in construction

== Finances ==
For the fiscal year 2023, BJ's reported earnings of $19.968 billion, with a net income of $523.741 million .

Year	Revenue in thou. US$	Net income in thou. US$	Price per Share in US$ (year end)	Warehouses	Employees	Ref(s)
2014	12,731,270	19,013	-	207		
2015	12,467,553	24,104	-	213		
2016	12,350,537	44,224	-	214		
2017	12,754,589	50,301	-	215		
2018	13,007,347	127,261	-	216	26,383	
2019	13,190,707	187,176	22.74	217	27,231	
2020	15,430,017	421,030	37.28	221	32,000	
2021	16,667,302	426,652	66.97		34,000	
2022	19,315,165	513,177	66.16		34,000	
2023	19,968,689	523,741	66.66		34,000	

On May 17, 2018, BJ's filed to return to the public market. The shares opened at $21.25; in its IPO, BJ's sold 37.5 million shares, raising net proceeds of $637.5 million.

== Brands ==
BJ's Wholesale Club regularly markets numerous products under its own private labels—including products by Richelieu Foods. Unlike its competitors (such as Costco's Kirkland Signature line and Sam's Club's Member's Mark brand), BJ's uses multiple private label brands depending on merchandise segment. Grocery products are primarily branded as Wellsley Farms, while general merchandise (including clothing, pharmacy, and home goods) items are sold under the Berkley-Jensen name (formerly 'Berkley & Jensen').
