= Zayre =

Discount retailer in the United States

- Final Zayre logo, used from 1976 to 1990

- Zayre Department Store located at the Boardman Plaza in Boardman, Ohio. Opened in October of 1972.
- Type: Department store
- Industry: Retail
- Founded: 1919 (as the New England Trading Company); 1929 (as Bell Hosiery Shops); September 20, 1956; 70 years ago in Hyannis, Massachusetts
- Founders: Max Feldberg and Morris Feldberg
- Defunct: June 8, 1990; 36 years ago
- Fate: Reorganized into TJX; Zayre stores acquired by Ames
- Successor: TJX; Waban Inc (BJ's Wholesale Club)
- Headquarters: Framingham, Massachusetts
- Key people: Malcolm L. Sherman, CEO
- Products: Clothing, footwear, bedding, furniture, jewelry, beauty products, kitchen spices, electronics, toys, and housewares.

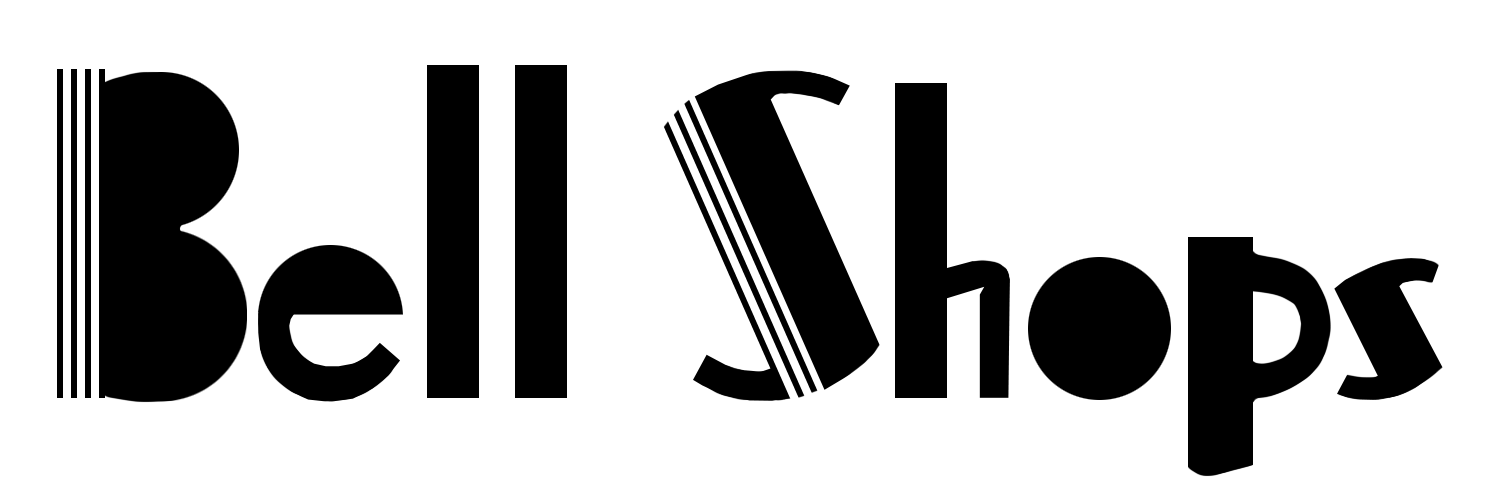
Bell Shops logo ca. 1930s

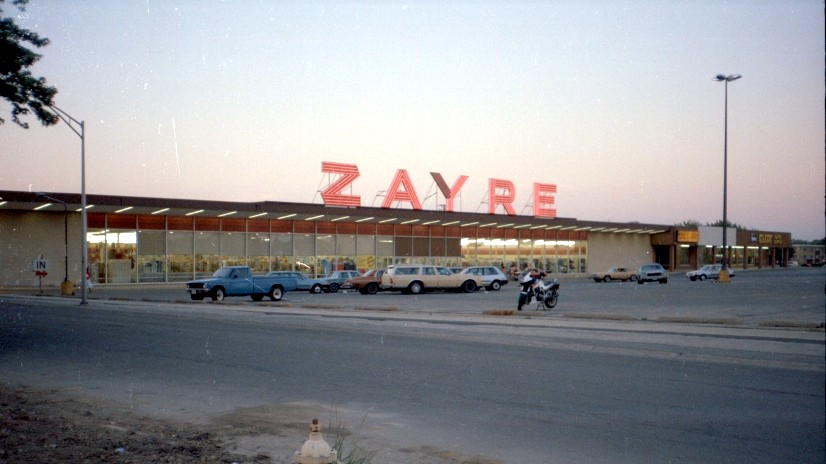
Zayre store in Addison, Illinois ca. 1980s

Zayre (/zɛər/) was a chain of discount stores that operated in the eastern half of the United States from 1956 to 1990. The company's headquarters were in Framingham, Massachusetts. In October 1988, Zayre's parent company, Zayre Corp., sold the stores to the competing Ames Department Stores, Inc. chain. In June 1989, Zayre Corp. merged with one of its subsidiaries, TJX, parent company of T.J. Maxx, which still exists today. A number of stores retained the Zayre name until 1990, by which time all stores were either closed or converted into Ames stores. (Note: Ames, Bradlees, Caldor, Service Merchandise, Venture, Woolco, and Zayre were national discount stores that closed due to changes in shopping places and patterns, and/or large debt from mergers and acquisitions.)

== History ==
Zayre was founded in 1919 as the New England Trading Company in Boston, Massachusetts, by brothers Max and Morris Feldberg. The brothers were Jewish immigrants who fled Russia to escape conscription in the Czar's army, settling in Chelsea, Massachusetts. An underwear and hosiery wholesaler, the company began as a supplier to full-line department stores and specialty shops. Ten years later, the brothers launched their first retail operation, Bell Hosiery Shops (later shortened to "Bell Shops").

Within a few years, Bell Shops expanded beyond underwear and hosiery into women's specialty stores, competing with such chains as Lerner Shops and Three Sisters. By the end of World War II, there were nearly 30 Bell Shops in the New England area. In 1946, the company doubled its number of stores with its buyout of New York City-based Nugents, another women's specialty store chain. With its store base in New York, Pennsylvania, Maryland, Delaware, New Jersey, and Washington, D.C., Nugents was a natural extension of the company's market area with almost no overlap.

=== The 1950s ===
By the early 1950s, company sales leveled off, and it became clear to the Feldbergs that drastic changes were needed for their business to remain viable. The Bell Shops/Nugent stores were suffering due to the decline of downtown business districts and to the rise of "mill" discount store operations.

With the family's second generation, Stanley H. Feldberg (son of Max) and Sumner A. Feldberg (son of Morris) now in positions of responsibility, the company began to explore options, putting considerable effort into studying the hugely successful mill stores. Mill stores began operation in closed, empty textile mills available at dirt-cheap rents selling mainly clothing, linens, and other softlines. As these companies became more successful, they began to build their own new stores, either free-standing or in shopping centers, allowing greater visibility along with the benefits of custom-built facilities.

Having settled on discounting as the logical direction in which to take their company, the Feldbergs decided to forego the mill building route and launch with a newly constructed store when the opportunity presented itself. That opportunity came in late 1955 when Stop & Shop, Inc. approached them with an offer to build them a store alongside a new Stop & Shop supermarket to be constructed in Hyannis, Massachusetts. On September 20, 1956, the Hyannis Zayre opened with 5,000 sq ft (460 m^{2}) of retail space. The store was soon expanded to 7,500 and then 10,000 square feet, and was replaced in 1962 with a 45,000 square foot unit directly behind it. A second Zayre store opened in September 1956 in the Roslindale section of Boston, a much larger 39,000 square feet. Within a few years, Zayre stores would average 70,000 to 90,000 square feet.

Longtime New York Times retail writer Isadore Barmash explained the origin of the chain's name in a 1985 article:

One day the Feldbergs and Bert Stern, an advertising consultant, were casting around for possible names for the new operation when Max broke off to take a call. He ended his phone conversation with a typical Yiddish phrase: "Zehr gut," or "very good." Stern repeated, "Zehr, where, we need a nice-sounding name." The men stared at one another. Zehr—"let's spell it Zayre"—for very good, they decided.

After a careful period of initial growth through the end of the 1950s, Zayre began to expand rapidly. Only six Zayre stores operated in 1959, approximately the same time that Zayre's volume reached that of the Bell Shops/Nugent stores. By 1962, there were 27 Zayre stores open, with ten to twenty new ones added annually for many years afterward. That same year, Zayre Corp. became a public company and began trading on the New York Stock Exchange.

=== The 1960s ===
Beginning in 1960, Zayre embarked on a program to open stores in major markets all across the eastern half of the U.S., with a presence in nearly every state east of the Mississippi River by the middle of the decade. The company opened new stores in clusters, so as to maximize brand presence and advertising efficiency. By the end of 1966, Zayre had 92 stores with major concentrations in the Chicago metropolitan area, Miami, and its home turf of Boston. Medium-sized Zayre markets at the time included Washington, D.C., Pittsburgh, Atlanta, Cleveland, Columbus, Ohio, Jacksonville, Tampa, and the Providence-area suburb of Warwick.

Some of this growth came through acquisition. Several locations in Washington, D.C., Chicago, and Florida were acquired through the bankruptcies of discount chains Towers Marts in 1963 and Consumers Mart of America in 1965. In December 1966, Zayre bought out Northern Enterprises, Inc., owner of four Shoppers' City stores in Duluth, Minneapolis, and St. Paul, Minnesota, eventually all Shoppers’ City locations where rebranding the stores as Zayre Shoppers' City stores. Zayre Shoppers’ City locations included, Duluth, West St Paul, St Louis Park, St Cloud, Bloomington, Columbia Heights, Coon Rapids, and Brooklyn Center.

In Zayre's early years, the stores' product mix leaned heavily toward softlines due to the Feldbergs’ experience in fashion, gained through years of operating the Bell Shops/Nugent stores. As the sixties progressed, Zayre's product offering more closely resembled that of a typical discount store, with toys, sporting goods, records, books, health and beauty products, and much more. A number of these departments were leased out to concessionaires during Zayre's first decade, including linens, greeting cards, candy, and health and beauty items, totaling nearly a third of Zayre's store revenues. In the mid-1960s, Zayre bought out many of these firms, leaving only a handful of departments as leased operations.

Zayre stores featured frequent flashing light 15-minute specials with live/recorded public address announcements meant to build excitement and drive traffic to specific departments, similar to Kmart’s Blue Light Specials. Zayre's slogan in the 1960s was, "Fabulous Department Stores", followed in the early 1970s with, "Compare... you can't do better than Zayre." Zayre was one of only a few stores to remain open 24 hours a day during the weeks preceding Christmas each year.

By the end of the 1960s, Zayre Corp. diversified into specialty retailing. Among Zayre's early acquisitions was the Hit or Miss chain, an off-price chain specializing in upscale women's clothing. The first store, which opened in Natick, Massachusetts, in 1965, flourished and grew into a chain so quickly that within four years, it attracted the attention of the much larger Zayre Corp.

In 1969, Zayre Corp. bought the Hit or Miss chain and began its exploration of the off-price fashion market. Zayre's timing could not have been better. During the recession of the 1970s, Hit or Miss's results climbed so rapidly that Zayre Corp. considered expanding its off-price upscale apparel merchandising.

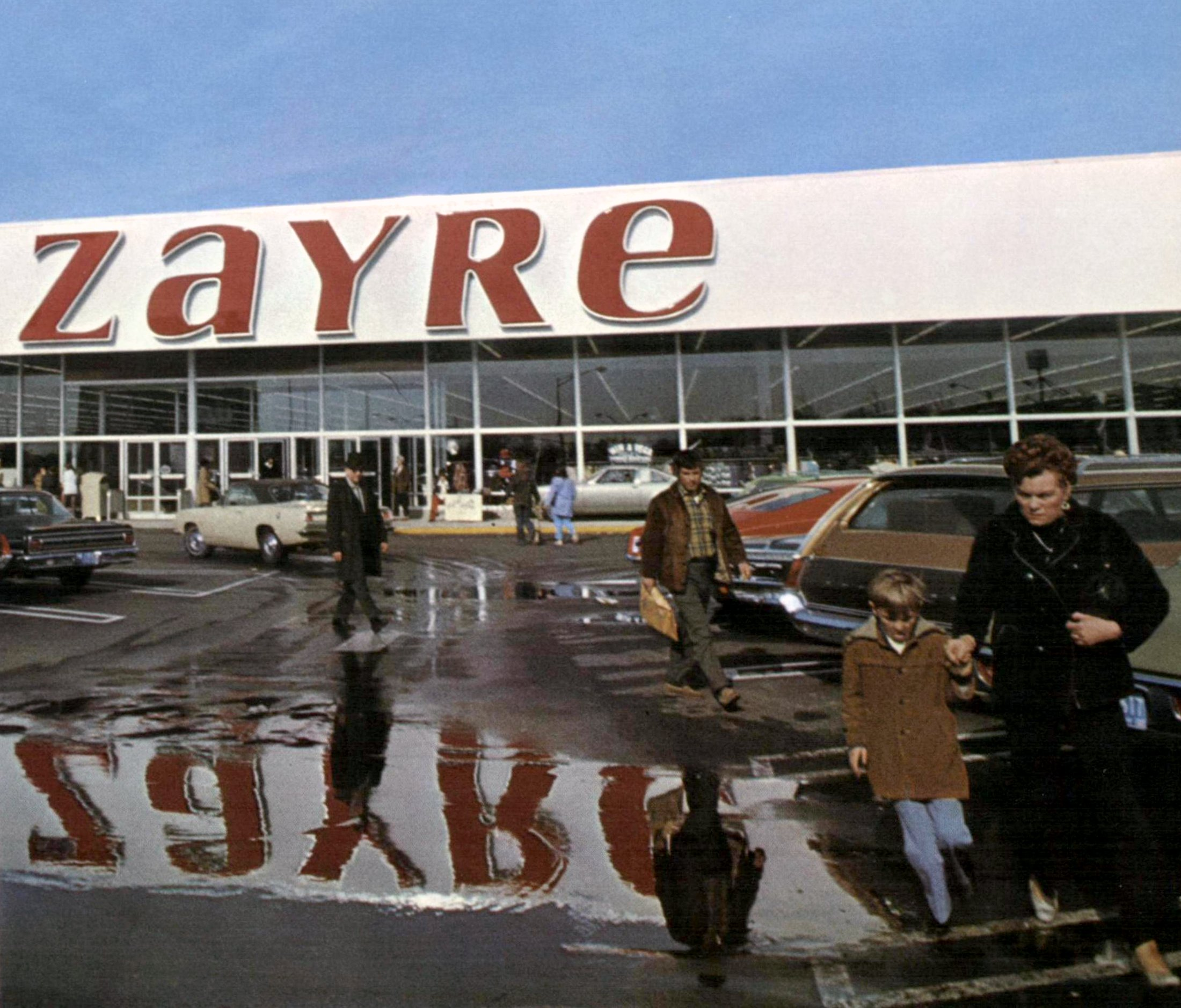
Zayre store and parking lot in 1971

=== The 1970s ===
Zayre Corp. first attempted to buy the Marshalls chain, already established as a retailer of off-price apparel for the whole family. When that effort failed, the company hired Bernard 'Ben' Cammarata, previously General Merchandise Manager of Marshalls, to essentially create a Marshalls clone.

In March 1977, he opened the first T.J. Maxx in Auburn, Massachusetts, quickly followed by a second store in nearby Worcester. The stores were popular with customers, including middle- to upper-middle-income shoppers, providing a solution to the heightening demand for quality fashions at cheaper prices with different assortments.

=== The 1980s ===
Within six years of that T.J. Maxx opening, Zayre Corp. found another avenue to the off-price fashion market. In 1983, Chadwick's of Boston began to sell selected Hit or Miss items through mail-order catalogs. Hit or Miss and Chadwick's crossover operations allowed customers to handle products before ordering, and brought frequent buyers the convenience of home shopping.

By the mid-1980s, off-price specialty retailing had become important to Zayre Corp. Hit or Miss and T.J. Maxx had brought in just 14 percent of the company's operating income in 1980; by the first half of 1983 these operations were producing nearly 45 percent of its income. At the same time, however, Zayre was renovating its discount department stores and expanding its product mix.

In 1984, Zayre Corp. introduced a new warehouse retail concept to the Northeast called BJ's Wholesale Club. The self-service, cash-and-carry, membership warehouse sells general merchandise and food at wholesale prices. The following year, the company acquired Home Club, Inc., a chain of home improvement stores. While neither of these ventures was immediately profitable, Hit or Miss and T.J. Maxx continued to thrive.

In 1985, Zayre Corp. purchased the former Gaylord's store chain. However, many of the new Zayre stores opened during the 1980s suffered from cluttered aisles and messy appearances. Zayre began to feature appearances from celebrities such as Sherman Hemsley and Robert Guillaume in "Grand Re-openings" of their major stores, but even these events failed to improve their market share.

By 1986, the number of Hit or Miss stores in the United States had reached 420, and sales had climbed to $300 million (~$746 million in 2025). Some 70 percent of its inventory was made up of nationally known brands. The remaining 30 percent consisted of standard apparel, produced by Hit or Miss under its own private label. With such a merchandise mix, Hit or Miss was able to sell current fashions at 20 to 50 percent less than most specialty stores.

In 1986, profits of the Zayre chain, targeting low- to middle-income customers, dropped, although T.J. Maxx, Hit or Miss, and Chadwick's of Boston, targeting mid- to higher-income customers, continued to grow. That year alone, Zayre Corp. opened 35 more T.J. Maxx stores and 31 new Hit or Miss stores. Zayre Corp.'s off-price retailing chains had become so successful that by 1987 Zayre thought it prudent to organize them under one name and grant them autonomy from the decreasingly prosperous parent company.

In June 1987, just ten years after T.J. Maxx opened its first store, TJX was established as a subsidiary of Zayre Corp., with Cammarata serving as president and CEO. It sold 9.35 million shares of common stock in its initial public offering; Zayre Corp. owned 83 percent of the subsidiary.

=== Corporate reorganization ===
During this time, Zayre faced several challenges. In the first half of 1988, Zayre stores had operating losses of $69 million on sales of $1.4 billion. Observers blamed technological inferiority, poor maintenance, inappropriate pricing, and inventory pileups, and Zayre appeared ripe for takeover. Throughout all this, however, the TJX subsidiary continued to yield a profit.

In October 1988, Zayre Corp. decided to focus its energies on TJX. It sold the entire chain of nearly 400 Zayre stores to Ames Department Stores, Inc. In exchange, the company received $431.4 million in cash, a receivable note, and what was then valued at $140 million of Ames cumulative senior convertible preferred stock.

The company continued to home in on its profitable new core business, selling unrelated operations. In June 1989, it spun off its warehouse club division, Waban, Inc., which owned B.J.'s Wholesale Club and Home Club. The same month, Zayre Corp. acquired the outstanding minority interest in TJX. On the day it acquired the minority interest, the company merged with TJX and changed its name from Zayre Corp. to The TJX Companies, Inc. The newly named company, headed by Cammarata, began trading on the New York Stock Exchange.

The company's transition into an off-price fashion business was relatively smooth, but the Ames preferred stock it received in the Zayre transaction was a problem. While the stock was entitled to annual dividends, Ames had the option of paying the first four semiannual dividends with more Ames preferred stock rather than cash, an option that Ames exercised for each of the payments it had met. The value of Ames preferred stock was dubious, however, as Ames was closing stores and experiencing losses.

In April 1990, TJX established a $185 million reserve against its Ames preferred stock and contingent lease liabilities on former Zayre stores as a result of Ames' announcement of continued poor performance. That same month, Ames filed for protection from creditors under Chapter 11 of the U.S. Bankruptcy Code.

By 1990, all Zayre stores had been closed or converted into Ames stores, and what had once been America's fifth largest discount retailer was no more.

== Banners ==
These are banners used by Zayre Corp. before the Ames acquisition of Zayre stores:

- AJWright
- BJ's Wholesale Club
- Beaconway Fabrics
- Bell Shops
- Hit or Miss
- Home Club
- Spree! Toy Stores
- T.J. Maxx
- Zayre
- Zayre Shoppers' City
- Warwick Shoppers World (Converted to Zayre)

== See also ==
- List of defunct department stores of the United States
