= HomeBase =

Defunct home improvement warehouse chain

The HomeBase Home Improvement Store Chain Company, Inc.
- Type: Public
- Traded as: NYSE: HBI
- Industry: Retail
- Founded: January 12, 1983; 43 years ago
- Defunct: March 19, 2002; 24 years ago (19 years, 2 months and 7 days)
- Fate: Chapter 11 Bankruptcy Liquidation
- Headquarters: Irvine, California
- Products: lumber; tools; hardware; garden supplies & plants

HomeBase was a home improvement warehouse chain in the Western United States based in Irvine, California.

== History ==
Robert J. McNulty and George Handgis founded the chain as a warehouse club called the HomeClub, opening the first two stores in Norwalk and Fountain Valley, California, in 1983. It went public in 1985, trading on the New York Stock Exchange under the symbol HBI.

In 1985, it was acquired by Zayre, a Framingham, Massachusetts-based discount department store chain. After Zayre was acquired by Ames, HomeClub was spun off under a new company called Waban Inc., which also owned BJ's Wholesale Club. In 1991, it discontinued its membership program and adopted the HomeBase name shortly thereafter.

The chain expanded to 89 stores by the mid-1990s, becoming the sixth largest home improvement retailer in the United States. Although it outperformed competitors like Orchard Supply Hardware and Builders Square, it could not match the growth or pricing power of The Home Depot or Lowe's. On December 5, 2000, after several dramatically unprofitable years, it was announced that 67 of its stores would be converted to a home decorating superstore chain, House2Home, and the remainder closed. House2Home would fare no better, filing for Chapter 11 bankruptcy on November 7, 2001, and ceasing operations by early 2002.
