= TJ Maxx =

American discount department store chain

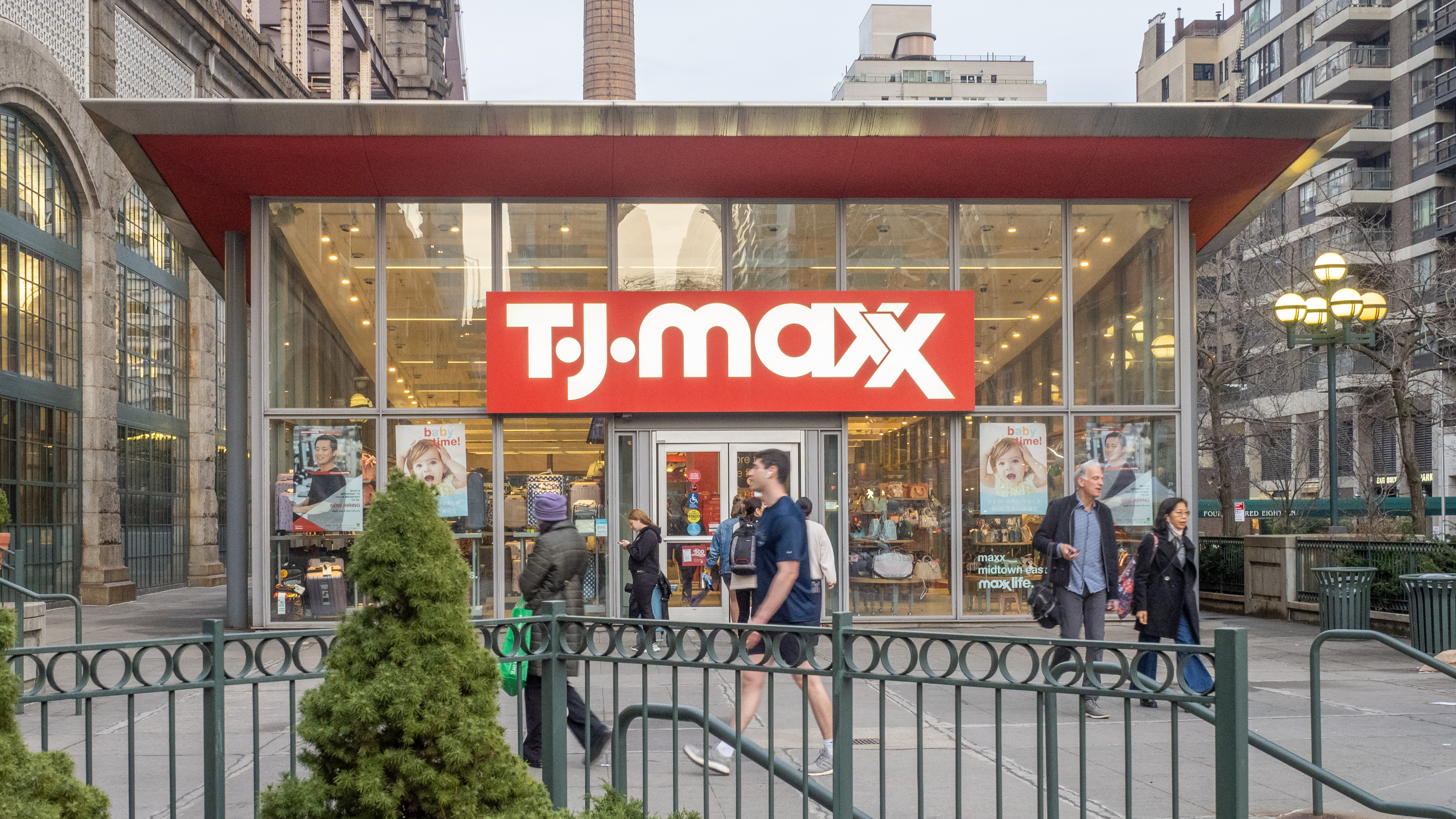
- TJ Maxx store in Upper East Side, Manhattan
- Type: Subsidiary
- Industry: Retail
- Genre: Department store
- Founded: 1976; 50 years ago in Framingham, Massachusetts
- Founder: Bernard Cammarata
- Headquarters: Framingham, Massachusetts
- Number of locations: 1,333
- Areas served: United States
- Key people: Ernie Herrman (CEO)
- Products: Clothing, footwear, jewelry, beauty products, bags, accessories, bedding, bath, furniture, home decor, toys, housewares, pet supply, and giftware
- Parent: Zayre (1976–1987); TJX (1987–present)
- Website: tjmaxx.tjx.com

TJ Maxx (stylized as T•J•maxx) (Note: The name is sometimes punctuated as T.J. Maxx or T.J.Maxx.) is an American discount department store chain. It has more than 1,000 stores in the United States, making it one of the largest clothing retailers in the country. TJ Maxx is the flagship chain of TJX. It sells men's, women's and children's apparel and shoes, toys, bath and beauty products, accessories, jewelry, and home products ranging from furniture and decor to housewares and kitchen utensils.

TJ Maxx and Marshalls operate as sister stores, and share a similar footprint throughout the country. Their product prices and inventories are usually identical and they have similar store layouts. In some locations, a Marshalls may be more upscale than a nearby TJ Maxx, carrying their Runway inventory where the TJ Maxx does not, while in other cities, the inverse may be true. However, across their chain, they are, for all practical purposes, the same store.

The CEO of TJX is Ernie Herrman.

== History ==
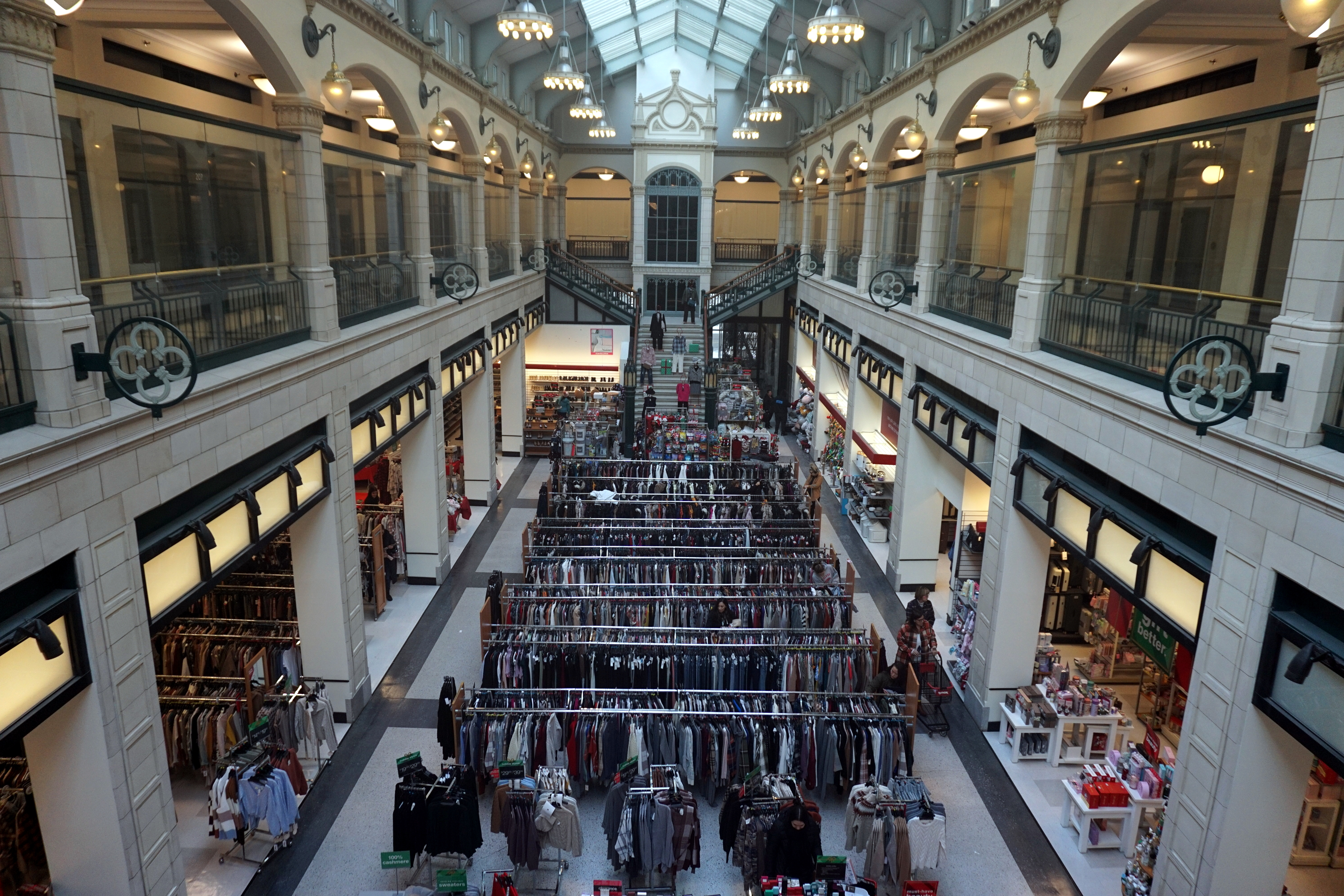
TJ Maxx in the Plankinton Arcade in Milwaukee

TJ Maxx was founded by Bernard Cammarata and the Zayre chain of discount department stores. Zayre had tried but failed to purchase Marshalls, so Zayre hired Cammarata, who had been Marshalls' head of merchandising, to create a rival chain. The first two TJ Maxx stores opened in Worcester, Massachusetts, and Auburn, Massachusetts, on March 31, 1977. The concept proved so successful in the face of the main Zayre chain's losses that Zayre sold its namesake chain to Ames, a rival discount department store, in September 1988. In December, Zayre announced a restructuring plan for the company and was renamed as TJX Companies, Incorporated. TJX bought Marshalls in 1995.

In March 2009, TJX launched an e-commerce site. At first only selling handbags, the range of items was later expanded to include clothing, shoes, jewelry, other accessories, and some home goods.

Outside of North America, TJ Maxx is known as TK Maxx. The name was modified to avoid confusion with the British retail chain T. J. Hughes. The European headquarters are based in Watford, Hertfordshire.

=== Comparison with competitors ===
Business Insider described TJ Maxx as "Macy's worst nightmare" in a 2016 article by Mallory Schlossberg. In a later article Schlossberg also reported on how TJ Maxx's soaring sales "should be concerning for ailing department stores that are fighting to get people to pay full price." As off-price retailers became an increasing threat to traditional department stores, signaling a change in consumer buying habits, TJ Maxx's revenue grew to surpass that of Macy's.

According to The Economist, "the overheads at TJX and Ross are, as a percentage of sales, about half those of Macy's or Nordstrom". Fortune stated that "the quicker inventory turn[s] and the sense that an item on a rack might not be there the following week at a TJ Maxx or a Marshalls has led to a boom in this area of retail and made such stores a rarity in the business: shoppers are coming to stores."

=== Data theft ===
In 2007, the company disclosed a computer security breach dating back to 2005: computer hackers had gained access to information about credit and debit card accounts used on transactions since January 2003. This exposed more than 100 million customers to potential fraud, making it the largest security breach in history at the time. According to the company, this affected customers who used their card between January 2003 and June 2004 at any branch of TJ Maxx. Details were stolen by hackers installing software via Wi-Fi in June 2005 that allowed them to access personal information on customers. The breach continued until January 2007.

Affected TJX stores included TJ Maxx, Marshalls, HomeGoods, A.J. Wright, Bob's Stores in the United States, Winners and HomeSense stores in Canada, and possibly TK Maxx stores in the UK and Ireland.

Eleven people from around the world were charged with the breach in 2008. In 2007, outside security provider Protegrity estimated that TJ Maxx's losses as a result of the data breach might reach £800 million in the following years, as a result of paying for credit checks and administrative costs for managing the fallout from the breach.

The TJ Maxx Corporation was sued by the Massachusetts Bankers Association and co-plaintiffs including Maine and Connecticut Associated Banks for the data theft. In March 2010, computer hacker Albert Gonzalez was sentenced to 20 years in federal prison after confessing to stealing credit and debit card details from a number of companies, including TJ Maxx.

== See also ==
- TJX
- Ross Stores
- Burlington
- TK Maxx
- List of department stores of the United States
