= Marshalls =

American multinational discount department store chain owned by TJX

Marshalls, Inc.

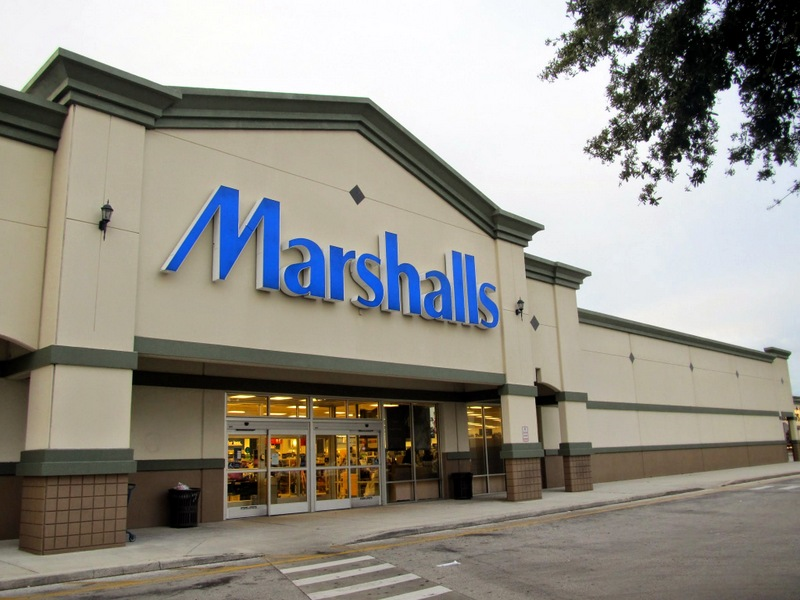
- A typical Marshalls store in Orlando, Florida.
- Type: Subsidiary
- Industry: Retail
- Founded: 1956; 70 years ago Beverly, Massachusetts, U.S.
- Founders: Alfred Marshall; Bernard Goldston; Norman Barren; Irving Blitt
- Headquarters: Framingham, Massachusetts
- Number of locations: US: 1,130 (May 2, 2020); Canada: 100; Total: 1,230
- Products: Clothing, footwear, jewelry, beauty products, bags, accessories, bedding, bath, furniture, home decor, toys, housewares, pet supply, and giftware.
- Parent: Melville Corporation (1976–1995); TJX (1995–present)
- Website: www.marshalls.com/ (USA) www.marshalls.ca (Canada)

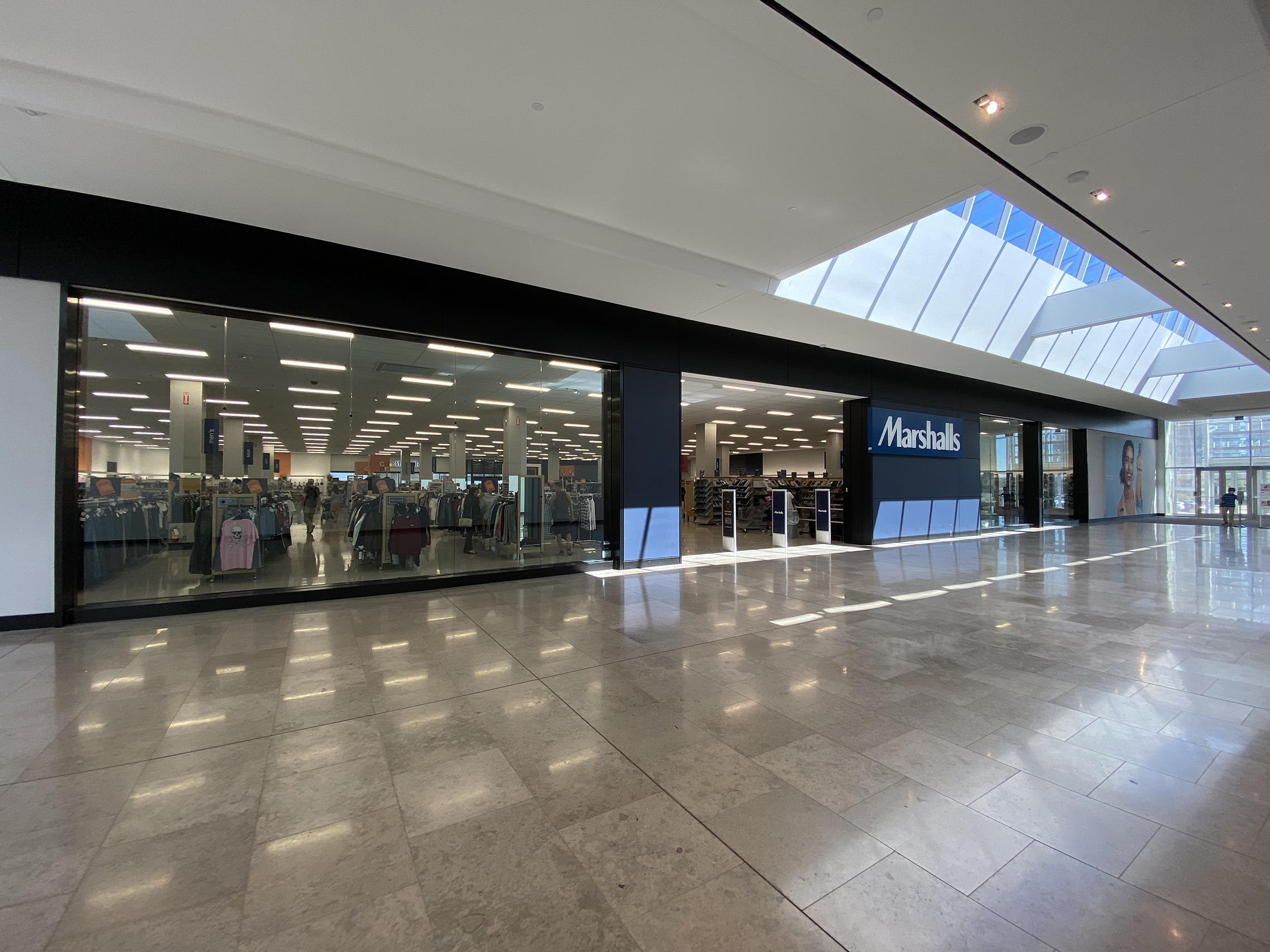
Marshalls store in Erin Mills Town Centre, Mississauga, Ontario, Canada

Marshalls, Inc. is an American chain of discount store formatted department stores owned by TJX. Marshalls has over 1,000 American stores, including larger stores named Marshalls Mega Store (stores operating with HomeGoods combined), covering 48 states and Puerto Rico, and 61 stores in Canada. Marshalls first expanded into Canada in March 2011.

Marshalls is one of the largest U.S. off-price family apparel and home fashion retailers, along with its sister company, TJ Maxx. Its slogan is "Get the good stuff".

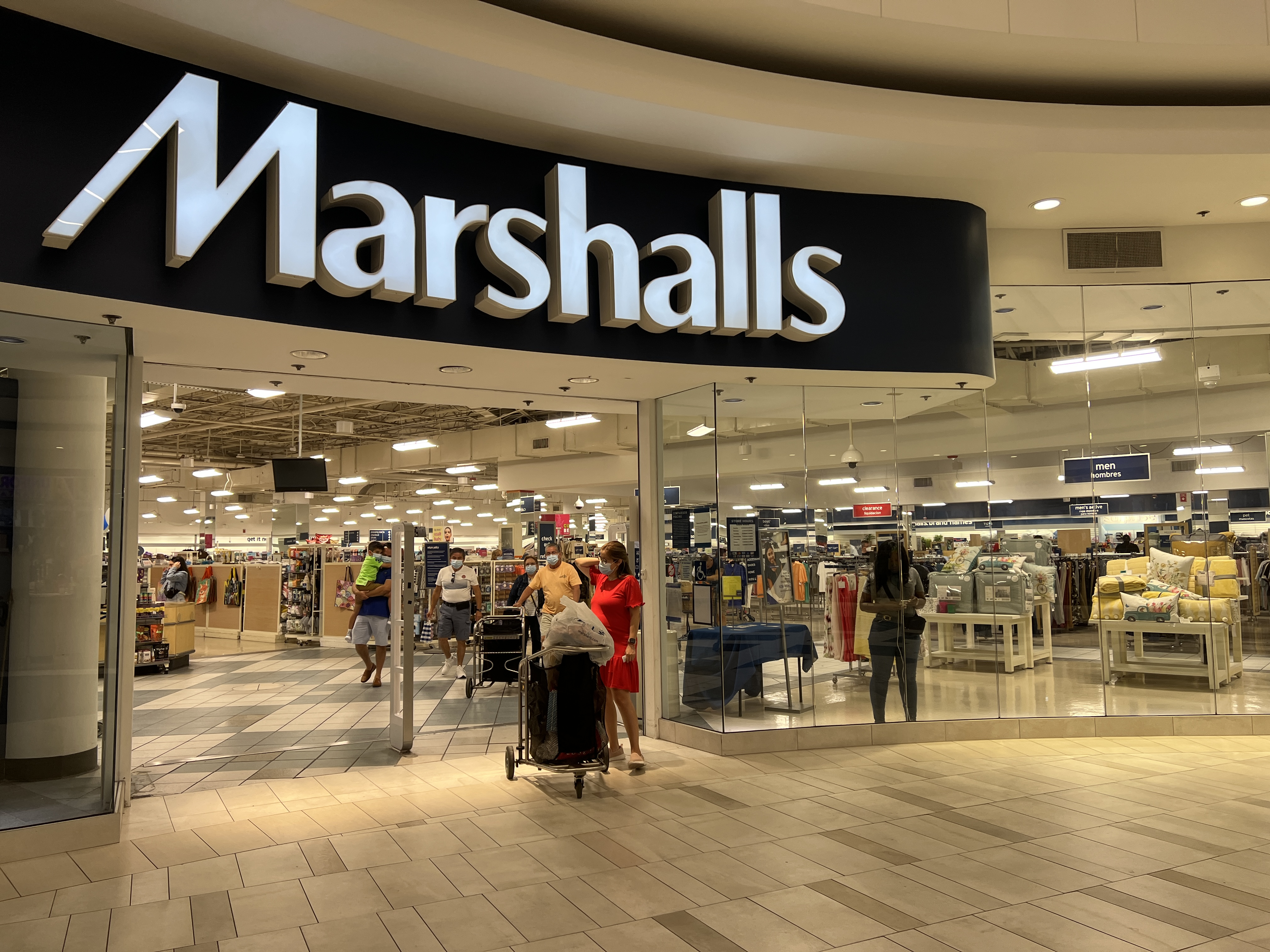
Marshalls Mega Store in Sawgrass Mills, Sunrise, Florida

== History ==
=== Independent company ===
Marshalls traces its history to 1956, when Alfred Marshall gathered a group of entrepreneurs on the East Coast, including Bernard Goldston, Norman Barren, and Irving Blitt (Frank Estey and Bernard Ribas joined the entrepreneurs in 1960 by purchasing Bernard Goldston's shares), to collectively start up the "Brand Names For Less" concept. Marshalls did not carry clothing until Irving Blitt (who later handled the sporting goods concession) called his friend Al Marshall letting him know he had the opportunity to purchase factory second Arrow shirts while on a trip to New York.

Contemplating the dual postwar phenomena of a boom in the economy and growth in the suburbs, Marshall and associates came upon a way to meet it profitably. Together, they opened a self-service department store in Beverly, Massachusetts, offering apparel and homewares at low prices. Additional floor space was "sublet" to offer customers shoes, hardware, and sporting goods from separate sellers, but the separate ownership of those departments was invisible to the shopper. The original store also had a soda fountain/grill, which was another sublet of floor space, the "A & M Luncheonette" (for Alice & Mickey Masters, the proprietors).

The concept proved extremely successful. Ten years later, Marshalls had become the leading off-price retail chain in the nation. In the 1970s, with recession affecting the spending habits of most shoppers, the off-price industry gathered speed. By buying up manufacturers' post-season, overrun, and close-out stock, Marshalls was able to offer fashionable, high-quality "designer" items at prices 20 to 60 percent less than those of the department stores.

=== Melville Corporation ===
In 1976, Marshalls was acquired by Melville Corporation. There were 36 stores in New England and California at this time. Marshall also independently owned five stores in St. Thomas, St. Croix, and St. Maarten in the Caribbean. The brand surpassed $1 billion in sales in 1982.

By April 1987, there were 261 stores across the country. However, profits began to slip in the mid-1980s when the company shifted to lower-priced goods, competing with other discount stores rather than department stores. Since Marshalls made up 28% of Melville's sales at this time, there was a lot of focus on turning the store around. Marshalls was outperformed by rival TJ Maxx in the early 1990s.

By 1993, Marshalls had expanded throughout 42 states including Hawaii, and had opened several downtown locations. Its first location in Puerto Rico opened in 1994. The company's pretax operating earnings fell by 20% between 1993 and 1994.

=== TJX ===
In 1995, Marshalls was purchased by TJX, the parent company of its main rival, TJ Maxx, for $550 million. There were 496 stores at the time.

Marshalls and T.J. Maxx operate as sister stores, and share a similar footprint throughout the country. While the two offer near-identical prices and have similar store layouts, Marshalls differentiates itself by its emphasis on family footwear and larger men's and juniors departments.

Starting in 2005, Marshalls began introducing Shoe MegaShop departments in its stores. The company added MegaShops to 240 Marshalls stores in 2008, with another 200 planned for fiscal 2009. Marshalls soon expanded the concept into standalone stores.

In 2015, Marshalls opened its 1,000th store. In 2019, the company began operating a website for online shopping.

During the COVID-19 pandemic, Marshalls shut down all stores and suspended its online operations, closing all distribution and fulfillment centers and offices in March 2020. TJX began reopening stores in May and completed the process by the end of June.

In 2025, Marshall's announced the opening of five new locations. The new stores are part of the company’s plans to open at least 1,300 new locations worldwide across the TJX portfolio of stores, which includes T.J. Maxx, Marshall’s and HomeGoods.

== Legal troubles ==
TJX paid US$100 million settlement in California to settle an employee class-action suit in 2002, which alleged that Marshalls abused exempt/nonexempt classifications to avoid the payment of overtime or compensation time to employees in certain roles performing non-exempt job duties, as required by the federal Fair Labor Standards Act.

== Charity ==
The enterprise has developed national and local partnerships with U.S. charitable organizations. All donations and fund-raising efforts from Marshalls are connected to helping children, families, and their communities with these programs:

- Domestic Violence Prevention
- Breakthrough T1D (formerly JDRF)
- National Youth Anti-Drug Campaign
- St. Jude Children's Research Hospital
- United Way

== Marshalls Canada ==
Marshalls opened its first locations in Canada in March 2011. As of November 2016, Marshalls Canada had 50 stores with plans to operate approximately 100 stores across the country.

== See also ==
- H&M
- Ross Stores
