= Blake Nordstrom =

American businessman (1960–2019)

- Born: October 4, 1960; Washington D.C., U.S.
- Died: January 2, 2019 (aged 58); Seattle, Washington, U.S.
- Education: University of Washington
- Occupation: Businessman
- Spouse: Molly A. Lewis (m. 1988)
- Children: 2
- Relatives: Bruce Nordstrom (father); Jeannie Nordstrom (mother); Erik Nordstrom (brother); Peter Nordstrom (brother)

Blake Willard Nordstrom (October 4, 1960 – January 2, 2019) was an American businessman. The great-grandson of John W. Nordstrom, he served as sole President of the Nordstrom department store chain from 2000 to 2014, and then co-president with his brothers, Peter, and Erik Nordstrom, from 2015 until his death in 2019.

He was a former director of the Federal Reserve Bank of San Francisco. A graduate of the University of Washington, he married Molly A. Lewis in 1988 with whom he had two children.

Nordstrom died on January 2, 2019, after being diagnosed with lymphoma.
