= Nils August Johanson =

Nils August Johanson (1872–1946) was a Swedish-born American surgeon, who founded the Swedish Medical Center, the largest nonprofit health provider in the greater Seattle area.

== Biography ==
Nils August Johanson was born in Lund, Sweden. Johanson immigrated to the United States from Sweden in 1893. He enrolled in the University of Denver and completed his medical degree in 1903. He subsequently moved to the Pacific Northwest, first to Tacoma then to Seattle in 1907. In 1908, a group of 10 area businessmen joined Johanson in signing incorporation papers for Swedish Hospital. The hospital's incorporation papers stipulated that only Swedish Americans could be trustees, a requirement that would remain in place until 1967. Dr. Johanson led the hospital until the mid-1940s. As of 2014, the Swedish Medical Center operates five hospital campuses and a network of more than 100 primary-care and specialty clinics, 9,450 employees and 6,023 credentialed physicians.

Dr. Johanson was married to Katharine Brown (1876-1944). Dr. Johanson died on 7 March 1946 in Seattle. Their only daughter, Katharine "Kitty" Johanson, married Elmer Nordstrom (1904–1993), co-president of Nordstrom and they had two sons: James Nordstrom and John Nordstrom.

== Other sources ==
- Nordstrom, Katharine Johanson; Marshall, Margaret (2002) My Father's Legacy: The Story of Doctor Nils August Johanson, Founder of Swedish Medical (University of Washington Press) ISBN 978-0295982656
- Goff, Willard F. (1970) Seattle's Pioneer Hospitals (Seattle, Willard F. Goff)
