= Elmer Nordstrom =

American businessman

- Born: Elmer J. Nordstrom; November 23, 1904; Seattle, Washington, U.S.
- Died: April 4, 1993 (aged 88); Seattle, Washington, U.S.
- Education: University of Washington
- Occupation: Co-president of Nordstrom
- Spouse: Katharine (Kitty) Nordstrom
- Children: 2
- Parent(s): John W. Nordstrom; Hilda Carlson
- Relatives: Everett Nordstrom (brother); Bruce Nordstrom (nephew); Anne Gittinger (niece)

Elmer J. Nordstrom (November 23, 1904 – April 4, 1993) was an American businessman, co-president of Nordstrom, the department store chain founded by his father, John W. Nordstrom.

== Early life ==
He was born in Seattle on November 23, 1904, the second son of John W. Nordstrom and Hilda Carlson. He graduated from Broadway High School in 1923, and from the University of Washington.

== Career ==
In 1928, John W. Nordstrom retired and sold his shares of Wallin & Nordstrom to his two eldest sons, Everett and Elmer. In 1929, Carl Wallin also retired and sold his shares to them. 1930 marked the change of name to Nordstrom. In 1933, the third son Lloyd joined. They ran the business as co-presidents.

The three brothers focused on good value and quality, coupled with customer service, and by the 1960s, had the largest independent shoe store chain in the US, and the largest store in the country in downtown Seattle. In 1963, they bought Best Apparel, a Seattle-based women's clothing store, followed by a Portland, Oregon fashion retail store in 1966. They now offered shoes and clothing for all the family under the new name, Nordstrom Best.

In 1968, all three brothers retired, and the next generation took over - Everett's son, Bruce Nordstrom; Elmer's sons, James and John; Lloyd's son-in-law, Jack McMillan, along with family friend Bob Bender.

== Personal life ==
He was married to Katharine "Kitty" Johanson, and they had two sons, James and John Nordstrom.

His father-in-law, Dr. Nils Johanson, founded the Swedish Medical Center in Seattle, and Nordstrom joined the hospital board in 1935, and remained on it for over 50 years. He served on the boards of nonprofit organizations including the Pacific Northwest Research Foundation, the Northwest Kidney Foundation and The Arthritis Foundation.
