= Nordstrom Rack =

Multinational luxury outlet retail chain founded in the United States

Coordinates: 47.61237°N 122.3365°W

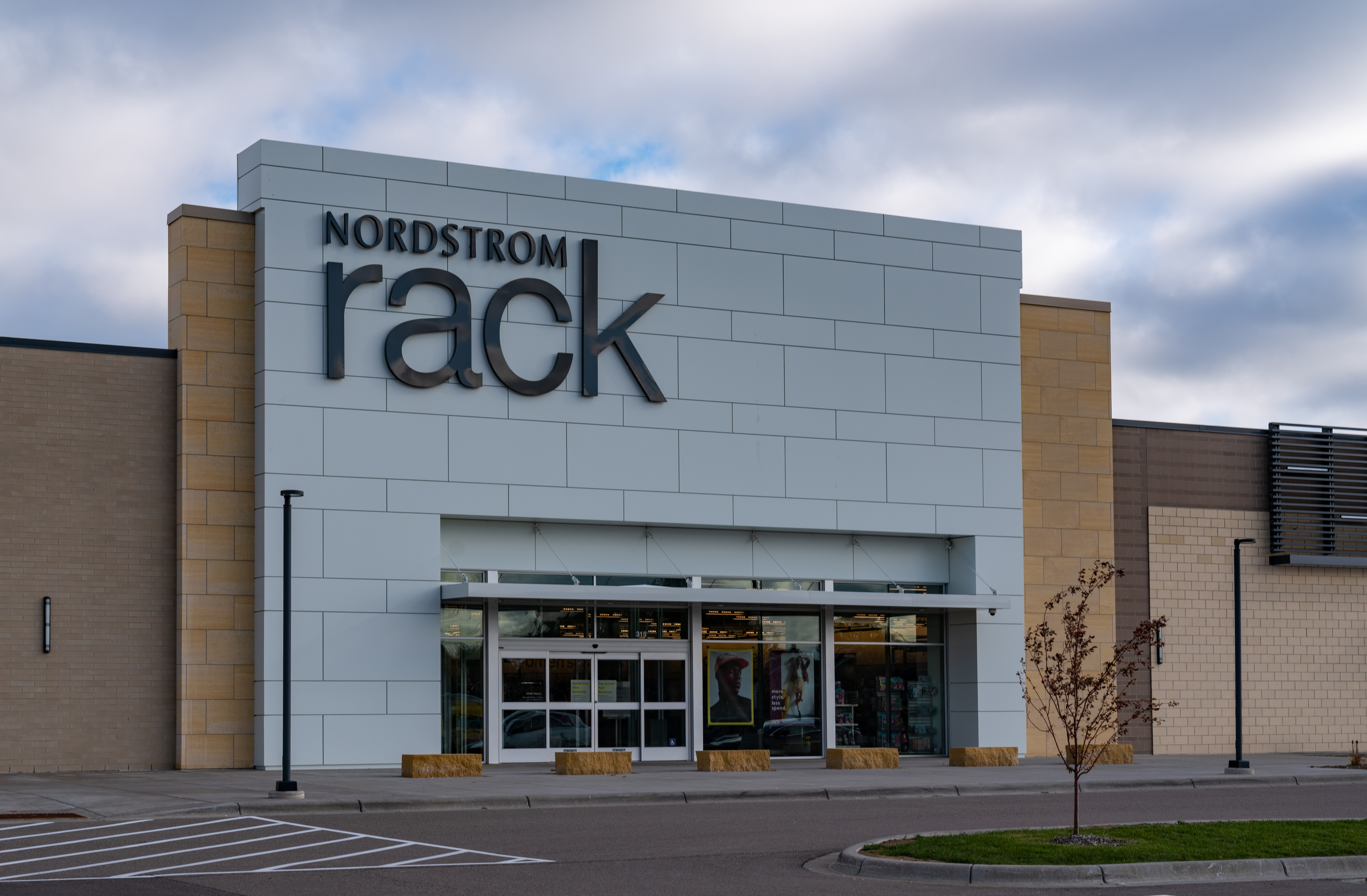
- The exterior of a typical Nordstrom Rack store with the former logo, pictured in 2018, in St Louis Park, Minnesota
- Type: Subsidiary
- Industry: Retail
- Founded: 1973; 53 years ago
- Headquarters: Seattle, Washington, U.S.
- Number of locations: 346 (2023)
- Area served: United States
- Key people: Gemma Lionello (president)
- Products: Clothing; jewelry; beauty; shoes; footwear; decor
- Revenue: ▲US$5.2 billion (2019)
- Parent: Nordstrom
- Website: nordstromrack.com

Nordstrom Rack is an American off-price department store chain founded in 1973. It is a sister brand to the luxury department store chain Nordstrom. As of 2023, Nordstrom Rack operates 348 stores in 41 U.S. states.

== History ==
In 1973, the company opened its first store in Seattle as a clearance outlet full-line store. The first Nordstrom Rack location was in the basement of the downtown Seattle Nordstrom store.

Its website was launched in February 2014 by HauteLook, which was acquired by Nordstrom in 2011. The Nordstrom Rack e-commerce site was built on a shared platform with HauteLook, which is Nordstrom's flash sale business.

Nordstrom Rack makes up about a fifth of Nordstrom's overall sales. Since 2013 Nordstrom Rack has generated over 2.5 billion dollars in sales.

On March 22, 2018, Nordstrom Rack opened its first store in Canada, which began its global expansion. All seven Nordstrom Rack stores in Canada closed on May 14, 2023, following Nordstrom's exit from the country.

On December 20, 2021, it was reported that Nordstrom was considering spinning-off Nordstrom Rack into a separate company.
