= John W. Nordstrom =

Swedish-American businessman (1871–1963)

- Born: February 15, 1871; Alvik, near Luleå, Sweden
- Died: October 11, 1963 (aged 92); Seattle, Washington, U.S.
- Citizenship: United States
- Occupations: Co-founder, Nordstrom, Inc
- Spouse: Hilda Carlson
- Children: Everett Nordstrom; Elmer Nordstrom; Lloyd Nordstrom
- Relatives: Bruce Nordstrom (grandson); Anne Gittinger (granddaughter)

John W. Nordstrom (born Johan Wilhelm Nordström, Swedish pronunciation: [ˈjuːhɑn ˈvɪlːhɛlm ˈnuːr(d)strœm]; February 15, 1871 – October 11, 1963) was a Swedish American businessman who was the co-founder of the Nordstrom department store chain.

== Background ==
He was born Johan Wilhelm Nordström (later anglicizing it to "John") in the village of Alvik, near Luleå. Nordstrom's father, a blacksmith, wainwright, and part-time farmer, died when Nordstrom was eight. Three years later, Nordstrom's mother took him out of school to work on the family farm. He emigrated to the United States at the age of 16. Arriving in America with $5 to his name, he worked his way across the continent taking jobs on railways and in mines, lumber camps and shipyards, eventually arriving in Seattle, Washington, in 1896.

While working at a sawmill he read a newspaper account of the discovery of gold in the Klondike and headed to Alaska to make his fortune. He invested in a claim on Gold Run, but his right to the claim was challenged and a lawsuit was filed. Nordstrom sold his claim when another party offered him $30,000 for it. After he sold it, he split the money with his two partners, and returned with his share ($13,000) to the warmer climate of Seattle.

== Nordstrom, Inc. ==
In Seattle, Nordstrom attended business school, built two rental houses on Capitol Hill, and decided to join his friend, Carl Wallin, in the shoe business. He and Carl opened Wallin & Nordstrom, a shoe store, at Fourth Avenue and Pike Street in 1901. From that first shoe store grew the Nordstrom retail empire. John Nordstrom retired in 1928 selling his stake to his sons Everett Nordstrom and Elmer Nordstrom. Everett and Elmer also acquired Carl Wallin's share of the company. John's third son Lloyd Nordstrom joined the company as a part owner in 1933. Members of the Nordstrom family still own 20% of Nordstrom Inc and closely supervise the chain. John Nordstrom never had a passion for the shoe business, although he continued to show up at the shoe store almost daily into his mid 80s to chat with customers. His initials JWN are used as the Nordstrom ticker symbol on the New York Stock Exchange.

== Personal life ==
In May 1900, John Nordstrom married fellow Swedish immigrant Hilda Carlson. They had three sons: Everett, Elmer, and Lloyd. All three eventually managed the store, in turn, as they graduated from the University of Washington School of Business. Children:

- Everett W. Nordstrom (1903 - 1972)
- Elmer J. Nordstrom (1904 - 1993)
- Lloyd N. Nordstrom (1910 - 1976)
- Mabel Nordstrom
- Esther Nordstrom

Nordstrom's only sister Maria's grandchildren and great-grandchildren still live in Alvik, the village where he was born, and in the nearby city of Luleå, all in the north of Sweden. They have done well in the transportation business, owning Alviks bus and trucking companies Alviks Trafik and NEX based out of Luleå. A cousin of Nordstrom, John Nordstrom, was a designer of the Parliament Building in Ottawa, Ontario, Canada. Some of his descendants, the Strand family, live in Minnesota. Nordstrom died on 11 October 1963, aged 92.

== Autobiography ==
- The Immigrant in 1887 (Dogwood Press. 1950)
