= Stokomani =

French discount store chain

- Formerly: Soldes na.ma.ni
- Type: SASU (simplified joint-stock company)
- Industry: Retail
- Founded: May 12, 1961; 65 years ago
- Founder: Maurice Namani
- Headquarters: Villepinte, Seine-Saint-Denis, France
- Number of locations: 151 (2024)
- Area served: France; Switzerland
- Key people: Philippe Thirache (president)
- Products: Discounted clothing, health & beauty, homeware, toys, seasonal goods
- Revenue: €719 million (2023)
- Owner: Zouari family (Family Office Zouari)
- Number of employees: 3,380 (2023)
- Website: www.stokomani.fr

Stokomani is a French clearance store chain. The off-price retailer, which was founded in 1961, has 86 stores in France. It sells products in five categories: fashion, health and beauty, homeware, toys and seasonal products.

== History ==
In 1961, Maurice Namani, a shepherd from Corsica, founded the company "Soldes na.ma.ni" in Paris. It quickly became a big name in buying and selling end-of-line clothes. Ten years later, the company opened its first store in Creil (Oise) followed by a second in La Seyne-sur-Mer in 1980. Although the clothing trade remained its core business, the company branched out into toys and the health and beauty sector. In 1995, it decided to develop its retail network: the company was revamped and renamed "Stokomani"... Today, it has 86 stores in France and is the French leader in large designer outlets. Its registered office is in Creil.

== Model and relationship with manufacturers ==
Stokomani's model is based on clearance. The retailer has two aims: meeting the needs of the general public, who want to shop smart but still enjoy the retail experience, and manufacturers, who need a reliable solution to maximize the distribution of end-of-line items. The products sold in Stokomani stores come from brands' and manufacturers' unsold stocks. These stocks are processed and repackaged to be sold in-store at more attractive prices for consumers.

== Trading concept and stores ==
Stokomani's concept is based on discounted designer brands. The idea is that customers can "shop smart" for products from major brands. The company's large stores cover 2,000 m^{2} (22,000 sq ft) on average. Products are sold in five main categories: fashion and accessories, health and beauty, homeware and interior design, toys and leisure plus a seasonal department that changes throughout the year (gardening, camping, school supplies, Christmas decorations, etc.). The retailer has weekly product cycles, meaning that the items available in-store change every week. The stores stock nearly 20,000 products in partnership with 300 major brands.

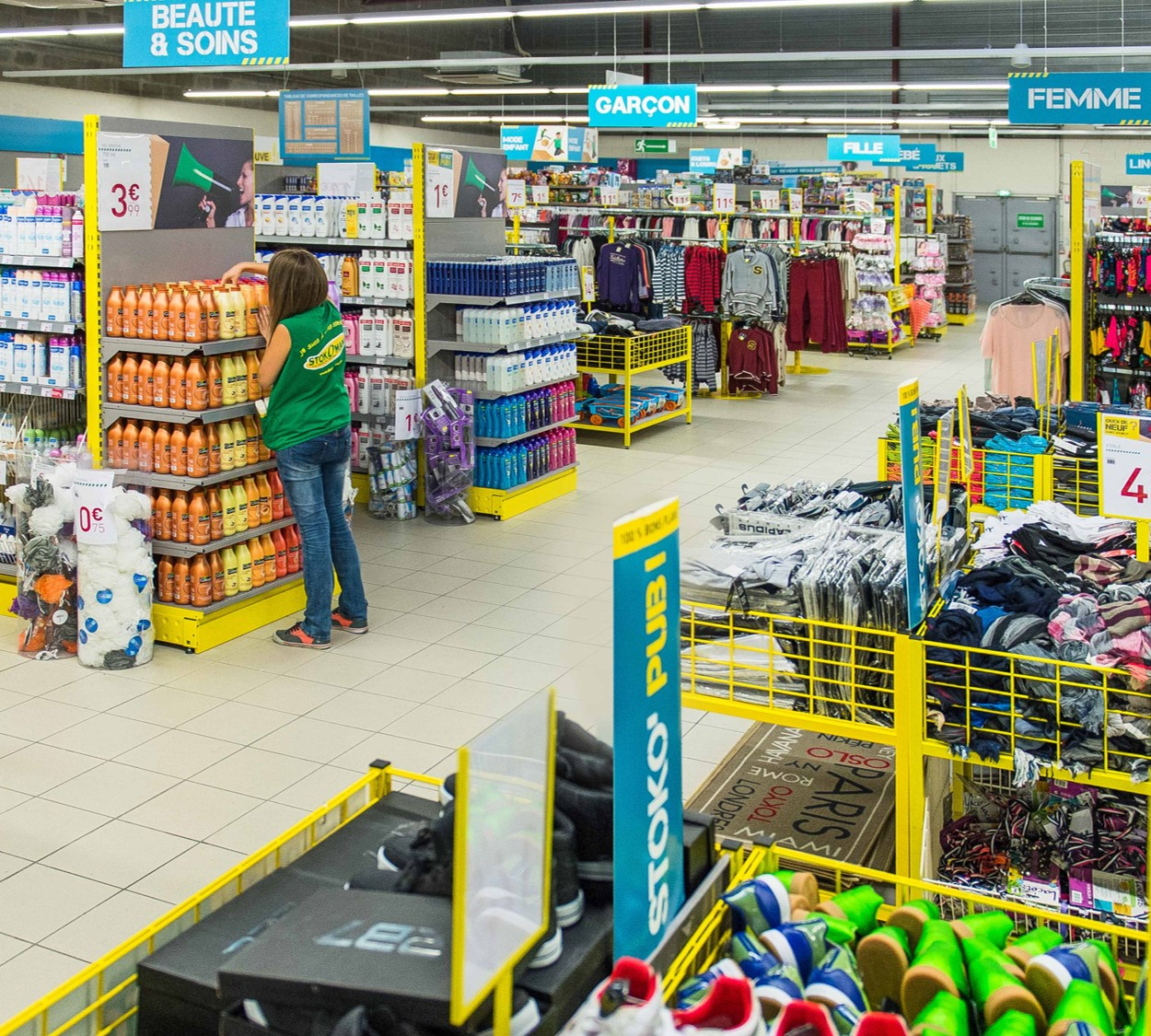
Interior of a Stokomani outlet store

== Supply chain ==
Stokomani works with over 300 suppliers in Europe and internationally. The company's first logistics platform adjoins the registered office with a second operated in Longueil-Sainte-Marie, taking its total logistic space to 80,000 m^{2} (860,000 sq ft).
