= Alviks IK =

Swedish football club

- Full name: Alviks Idrottsklubb
- Nickname: Alviks IK
- Founded: 1934
- Ground: Liko Arena, Alvik, Sweden
- Chairman: Alexandra Burman
- League: Division 3 Norrland
- 2021: Division 3 Norra Norrland, 1st (Promoted)
Home colours

Alviks IK are a Swedish football team in Alvik, Luleå Municipality. They play in Division 2 Norrland.

== Background ==
Alviks IK was formed on 5 February 1934. The club has played in the lower tiers of the Swedish football league system mainly in Division 3 and 4 in recent years. However, in the 2009 season they played in the Division 2 Norrland where they finished in tenth position after which they were relegated following the relegation playoff. They won the promotion to the Division 2 Norrland again after finishing 1st in the 2012 season in the Division 3. Alviks IK ladies team has played one season in the Damallsvenskan, in 2002.

== Season to season ==
Season	Level	Division	Section	Position	Movements
1999	Tier 4	Division 3	Norra Norrland	11th	Relegated
2001	Tier 5	Division 4	Norrbotten Södra	8th	
2001	Tier 5	Division 4	Norrbotten Södra	4th	
2002	Tier 5	Division 4	Norrbotten Södra	2nd	
2003	Tier 5	Division 4	Norrbotten Södra	1st	Promoted
2004	Tier 4	Division 3	Norra Norrland	12th	Relegated
2005	Tier 5	Division 4	Norrbotten Södra	1st	Promoted
2006*	Tier 5	Division 3	Norra Norrland	5th	
2007	Tier 5	Division 3	Norra Norrland	4th	
2008	Tier 5	Division 3	Norra Norrland	1st	Promoted
2009	Tier 4	Division 2	Norrland	10th	Relegation playoff - Relegated
2010	Tier 5	Division 3	Norra Norrland	2nd	Promotion Playoffs
2011	Tier 5	Division 3	Norra Norrland	3rd	
2012	Tier 5	Division 3	Norra Norrland	1st	Promoted
2013	Tier 4	Division 2	Norrland		

* League restructuring in 2006 resulted in a new tier being created at Tier 3 and subsequent divisions dropping a level.

== Attendances ==
In recent seasons Alviks IK have had the following average attendances:

Season	Average attendance	Division / Section	Level
2005	Not available	Div 4 Norrbotten Södra	Tier 5
2006	123	Div 3 Norra Norrland	Tier 5
2007	149	Div 3 Norra Norrland	Tier 5
2008	167	Div 3 Norra Norrland	Tier 5
2009	354	Div 2 Norrland	Tier 4
2010	152	Div 3 Norra Norrland	Tier 5

* Attendances are provided in the Publikliga sections of the Svenska Fotbollförbundet website.

== Staff and board members ==
2021

- Alexandra Burman – Chairman of the board
- Anders N.O. Eriksson – Cashier & Vice Chairman
- Bengt Nyström
- Per-Erik Johansson
- Anders X. Eriksson
- Mattias Israelsson
- Yvonne Wallo
- Eleonor Lundkvist
- Tommy Mörsare

2013

- (Sweden) Bengt Nysrtöm - Chairman of the board
- (Sweden) Kenth Hansson - Vice Chairman
- (Sweden) Anders Eriksson - Secretary
- (Sweden) Lars Sandberg - Cashier
