= Anne Gittinger =

American billionaire heiress

- Born: Anne Nordstrom; 1930 or 1931 (age 94–95)
- Education: University of Washington
- Known for: Owner of 11% of Nordstrom
- Spouse(s): D. Wayne Gittinger (1933–2014)
- Children: 2
- Parent: Everett Nordstrom
- Relatives: John W. Nordstrom (grandfather); Bruce Nordstrom (brother)

Anne Gittinger (née Nordstrom), is an American billionaire heiress, the granddaughter of John W. Nordstrom, the co-founder of the Nordstrom department store chain.

== Early life ==
She is the granddaughter of the co-founder of the Nordstrom department store chain, John W. Nordstrom, and the sister of Bruce Nordstrom, the company's former chairman and CEO. She has a degree from the University of Washington.

== Career ==
Gittinger is Nordstorm's largest shareholder after her brother Bruce Nordstrom.

As of April 2021, she had a net worth of $1.1 billion.

== Personal life ==
She was married to D. Wayne Gittinger (1933–2014), a pitcher on the Husky baseball team from Kellogg, Idaho. After graduating from UW in 1954 and its law school in 1957, he was a partner in the Seattle law firm Lane Powell and a former Nordstrom director. They had two children, and lived in Seattle.
