= Bruce Nordstrom =

American businessman (1933–2024)

- Born: Bruce Allen Nordstrom; October 1, 1933; Seattle, Washington, U.S.
- Died: May 18, 2024 (aged 90); Seattle, Washington, U.S.
- Education: University of Washington
- Occupations: Chairman and CEO, Nordstrom
- Known for: Owner of over 10% of Nordstrom
- Spouse: Jeannie Nordstrom
- Children: 3
- Parent: Everett Nordstrom
- Relatives: John W. Nordstrom (grandfather); Anne Gittinger (sister)

Bruce Allen Nordstrom (October 1, 1933 – May 18, 2024) was an American billionaire businessman, and the chairman of the retailer Nordstrom, a company founded by his grandfather John W. Nordstrom. He ran the company from 1968 until 1995 and resumed his position as chairman in 2000 until 2006. He was a philanthropist in the Seattle community and appeared on the Forbes list of wealthiest people in 2012.

== Early life and family ==
Bruce Nordstrom was born in Seattle on October 1, 1933. He was the grandson of John W. Nordstrom, founder of Nordstrom, Inc., which began as a shoe store in 1901. At the age of 9, Bruce Nordstrom began his career at the retailer working the stockroom and sales floor of Nordstrom's downtown Seattle store, making 25 cents an hour. Bruce continued working under his father, Everett Nordstrom and uncles, Elmer and Lloyd Nordstrom, until he pursued college.

He graduated from the University of Washington in 1955 with a bachelor's degree in economics. While at UW, Nordstrom became a member of the Beta Theta Pi fraternity.

== Career ==
For more than 40 years, Nordstrom led Nordstrom, Inc, growing it from seven shoe stores to more than 156 stores in 27 states, and a European chain of boutiques. During his tenure, he helped grow the company's sales from under $40 million to $8.6 billion.

In 1963, Nordstrom was named a president of Nordstrom, Inc. He became board co-chair in 1968 alongside cousins James and John, cousin-in-law Jack McMillan, and family friend, Bob Bender. They made up the third generation of Nordstroms, who led company expansion and profitability until the 1990s, when they began to retire.

In 1995, Nordstrom retired as co-chairman. The company leadership was restructured with Nordstrom's sons – Blake, Pete and Erik in leadership roles alongside a new CEO, John Whitacre. From 1995 until 2000, Nordstrom sales decreased and the company executed a marketing campaign to modernize the brand that was not well received. As a result, Whitacre left the company in 2000. Nordstrom returned as chairman for the second time, joined by his three sons in a new generation of leadership. The stores began to slowly turn around as the Nordstroms moved the focus back to employees. Profitability followed; in 2003, the company reached record revenues of $6.5 billion.

Nordstrom retired a second time in 2006, with Enrique "Rick" Hernandez Jr., a Nordstrom board member since 1997, taking on the role of chairman. His sons remain board members and company leaders.

In 2007, Nordstrom co-authored Leave It Better Than You Found It, a book documenting the history of Nordstrom Inc. and its philosophy.

As of January 2019, he had a net worth of US$1.2 billion.

== Philanthropy and community involvement ==
Nordstrom and his wife Jeannie were active volunteers and donors to nonprofit and civic organizations in Seattle. Nordstrom held leadership positions for the Downtown Seattle Association, Seattle Children's Hospital Foundation, Swedish Hospital, Seattle Goodwill, Delta Society and United Way of King County.

As an alumnus of the University of Washington, Nordstrom stayed active in athletics and community affairs. He was the chairman of the Tyee Board of Advisors and was a recipient of the Frank Orrico Award for "uncommon dedication" to the Department of Athletics in 1994. He was involved with the ownership of the Seattle Seahawks as part of the Nordstrom's family ownership of the team during its inaugural season of 1976.

== Personal life and death ==
Nordstrom married his first wife, Fran Wakeman, in 1959, and they had three sons – Erik and Peter, who both hold leadership positions at Nordstrom, and Blake, who died on January 2, 2019. Fran died in 1984, and Nordstrom married Jeannie O'Roark in 1988. Nordstrom died at his home in Seattle on May 18, 2024, at the age of 90.
