= Everett Nordstrom =

American businessman

- Born: January 13, 1903
- Died: July 1, 1972 (aged 69); Seattle, Washington, U.S.
- Education: University of Washington
- Occupations: Chairman and CEO of Nordstrom
- Children: Bruce Nordstrom; Anne Gittinger
- Parent: John W. Nordstrom
- Relatives: Elmer Nordstrom (brother)

Everett W. Nordstrom (January 13, 1903 – July 1, 1972) was an American businessman and former chairman and CEO of Nordstrom, the department store chain founded by his father, John W. Nordstrom.

== Early life ==
He was born on January 13, 1903, the first son of John W. Nordstrom and Hilda Carlson. He graduated from the University of Washington in 1923.

== Career ==
In 1928, John W. Nordstrom retired and sold his shares of Wallin & Nordstrom to his two eldest sons, Everett and Elmer. The following year Carl Wallin also retired and sold his shares to them. 1930 saw the company change its name to Nordstrom. In 1933, the third son Lloyd joined. They ran the business as co-presidents.

The three brothers focused on good value and quality, coupled with customer service, and by the 1960s, had the largest independent shoe store chain in the US, and the largest store in the country in downtown Seattle. In 1963, they bought Best Apparel, a Seattle-based women's clothing store, followed by a Portland, Oregon, fashion retail store in 1966. They now offered shoes and clothing for all the family under the new name, Nordstrom Best.

In 1968, all three brothers retired, allowing the next generation to take over - Everett's son, Bruce Nordstrom; Elmer's sons, James and John; Lloyd's son-in-law, Jack McMillan, along with family friend Bob Bender.

== Personal life ==
Everett Nordstrom collapsed and died on July 1, 1972, while playing golf at the Seattle Golf Club.
