= The Polyclinic =

US healthcare company

- Industry: Health care
- Founded: Seattle, Washington. 1917
- Founder: H.J. Davidson; C.F. Davidson; Earl Ristine; Kenneth Holtz; C.L. Templeton
- Headquarters: Seattle, Washington, Puget Sound, United States
- Area served: Pacific Northwest
- Key people: Lloyd David, CEO and Executive Director
- Owner: UnitedHealth
- Number of employees: 1,200
- Website: www.polyclinic.com

The Polyclinic is a group of health care facilities in Seattle, Washington. It has over 14 locations and 200 primary care and specialty physicians in most areas of medicine. On-site services are available at several locations, including: laboratory, radiology, mammography, ultrasound, echocardiography, MRI and CT scans.

== History ==
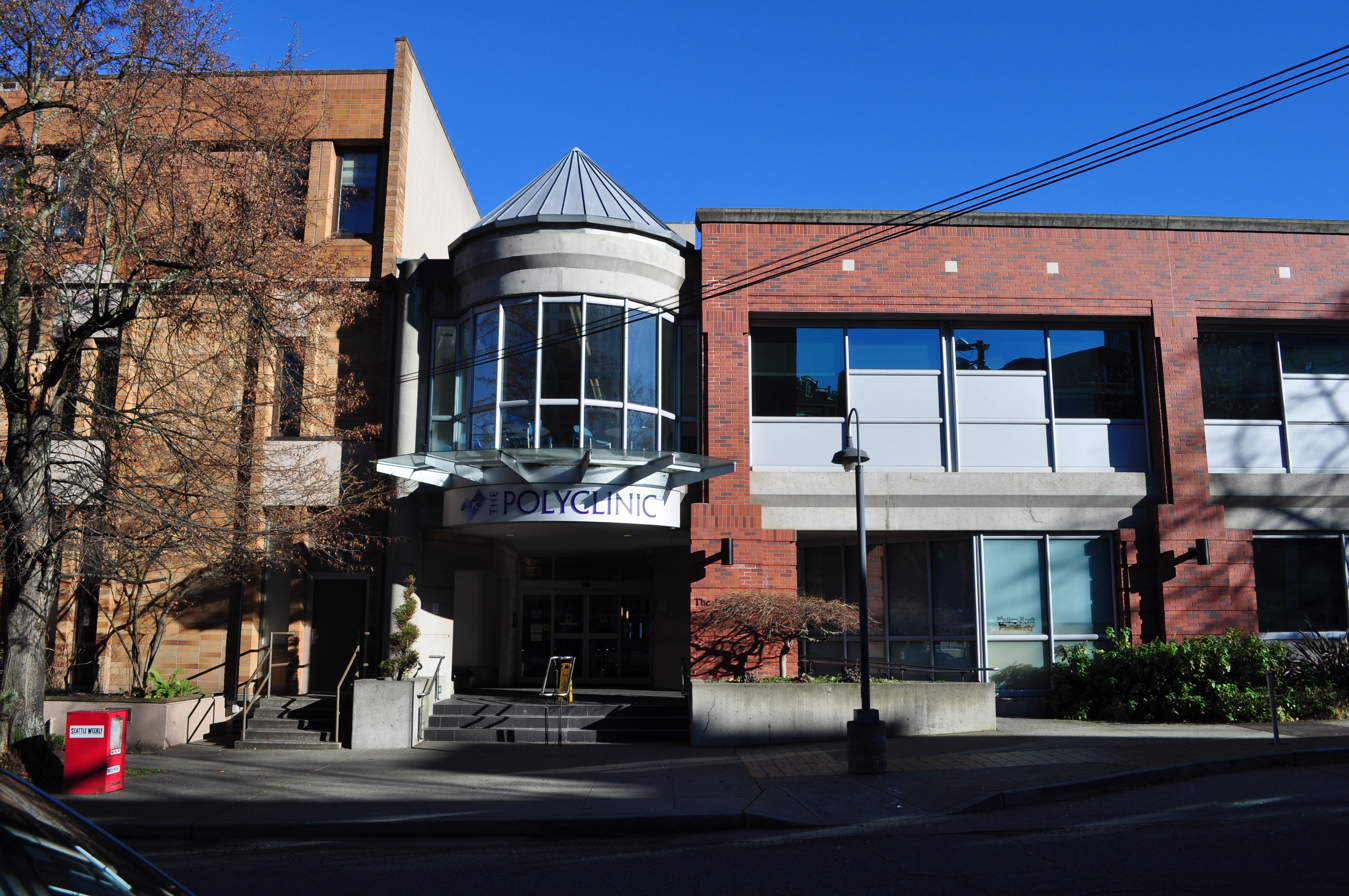
The Polyclinic on Broadway/First Hill

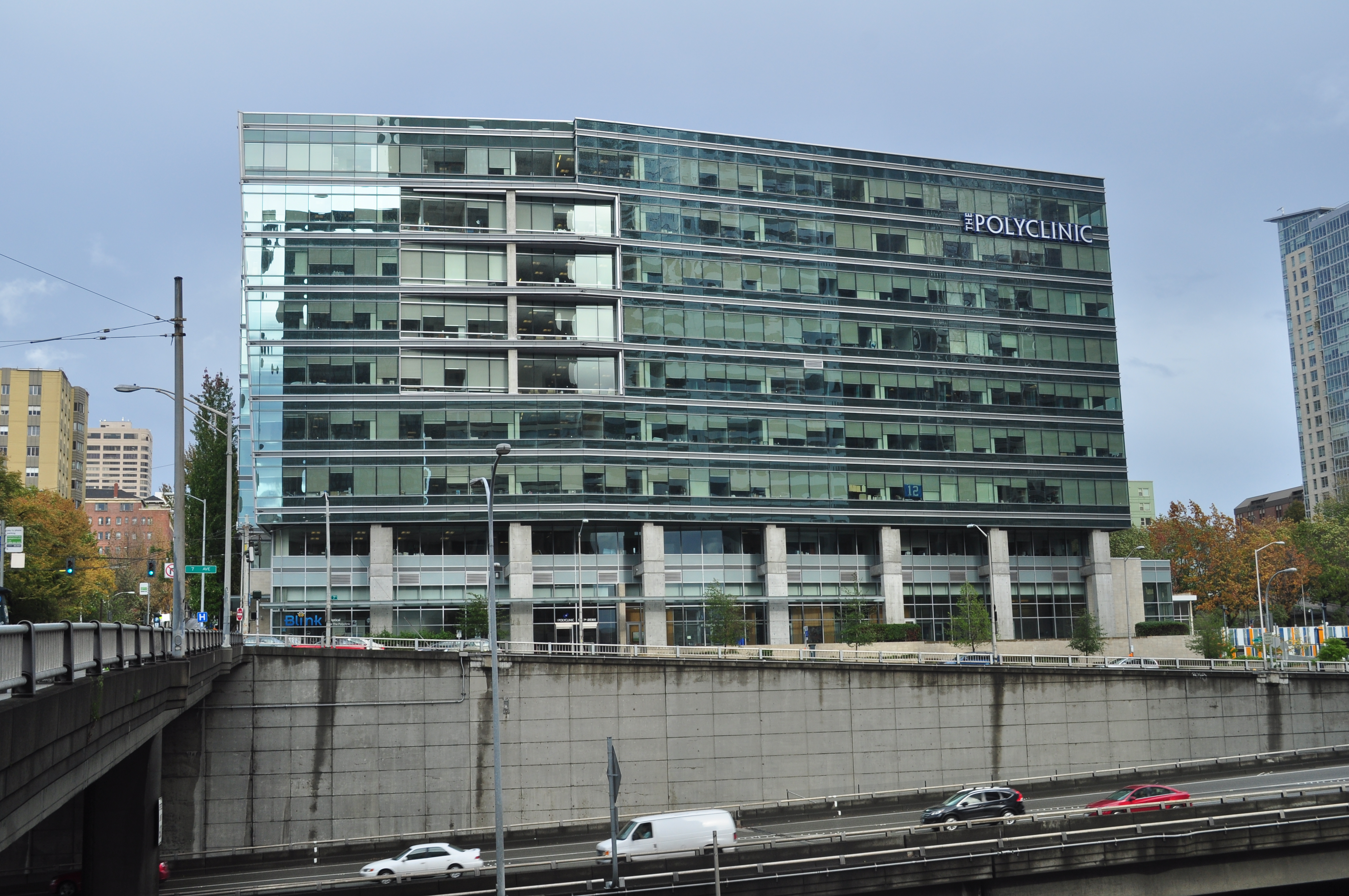
The Polyclinic Madison Center

The Polyclinic was established in 1917 by six physicians: Dr. H.J. Davidson, Surgeon; Dr. C.F. Davidson, General Practitioner; Dr. Earl Ristine, Urologist; Dr. Kenneth Holt General Practitioner; Dr. C.L. Templeton, OB/Gyn.

When its doors opened at the American Bank Building, located on 2nd Avenue in downtown Seattle, The Polyclinic offered primary and specialty care, supported by its own lab, x-ray, and surgery space.

After some expanding and an increase in offered care, The Polyclinic and its 11 physicians moved in October 1965 to one of its current locations on First Hill, Seattle at Broadway.

In 1965 The Polyclinic opened the Downtown location, featuring Family Medicine, Dermatology, Allergy / Asthma / Clinical Immunology, and Rheumatology.

Seattle Primary Physicians joined The Polyclinic in 2007, a change that incorporated six new locations into The Polyclinic. At this time, 21 new family practice doctors joined the organization. Around the same time The Polyclinic Northgate location opened, featuring Cardiology, Dermatology, Family Medicine, Gastroenterology, General Surgery, Internal Medicine, Nephrology, (Ear, Nose, and Throat), Plastic Surgery, Pulmonary Disease, Urology, and Cosmetic Surgery.

In 2009, The Polyclinic partnered with Swedish Medical Center to implement electronic health records.

In 2012, The Polyclinic Madison Center opened. This location became the main hub for primary and specialty care at The Polyclinic, visible from Interstate 5. At this time, the Broadway building became a satellite location to the Madison Center.

== Leadership ==
The Polyclinic is led by CEO and executive director Lloyd David who has been with the organization since 1994. David is one of the founders and former board members of the Washington Health Alliance. Rex F. Ochi is president of the Board of Directors.

== Foundation ==
The Polyclinic Community Health Foundation is a nonprofit organization established in 2004. The program provides approximately 1,800 prescriptions to low-income patients and serves an average of 125 patients every year.
