= HauteLook =

Retail website

Coordinates: 47.61237°N 122.3365°W

HauteLook, Inc.
- Type: Public
- Industry: Retail
- Founded: 2007
- Founder: Adam Bernhard
- Headquarters: Los Angeles, California, US
- Key people: Terry Boyle, President
- Products: Clothing, jewelry, beauty, shoes, home furnishings, decor
- Parent: Nordstrom
- Divisions: Nordstrom Rack
- Website: www.hautelook.com

HauteLook was a member-only shopping website offering flash-sales and limited-time sale events featuring women's and men's fashion, jewelry and accessories, beauty products, kid's clothing and toys, and home décor. HauteLook offered discounts of 50 to 75 percent off retail prices with new sale events every morning. Launched in 2007, HauteLook was owned and operated by Nordstrom after an acquisition in 2011. The brand was closed in 2021.

== History ==
HauteLook was launched in December 2007 in Los Angeles, California, by Adam Bernhard, a serial entrepreneur and former senior vice president at Joie clothing. Bernhard initially started the site as liquid8usa.com while he was working at Joie and noticed a market for off-price goods that were either in excess or leftover merchandise. In 2007, he renamed the website and launched HauteLook in Los Angeles with four employees.

HauteLook was purchased by Nordstrom in March 2011 for $180 million in company shares. This marks the first time that a traditional retailer has acquired a company specializing in online private sales.

In October 2013, Bernhard stepped down as chief executive officer of the company. He remains as an advisor to HauteLook and President Terry Boyle continues to lead the business, though no other CEO will be chosen.

In May 2014, HauteLook launched an e-commerce site and mobile app.

In August 2018, hackers stole data relating to over 28.5 million accounts and placed it for sale on the dark web. This security breach included email addresses, bcrypt hashed passwords, and names. The security breach was uncovered in February 2019.

The brand was closed by Nordstrom in 2021, with brands previously offered by Hautelook moved to NordstromRack.com.

== See also ==
- Nordstrom
- Deal-of-the-day
- List of data breaches
