= Swedish Health Services =

Health system in the Seattle area

- Providence Health & Services

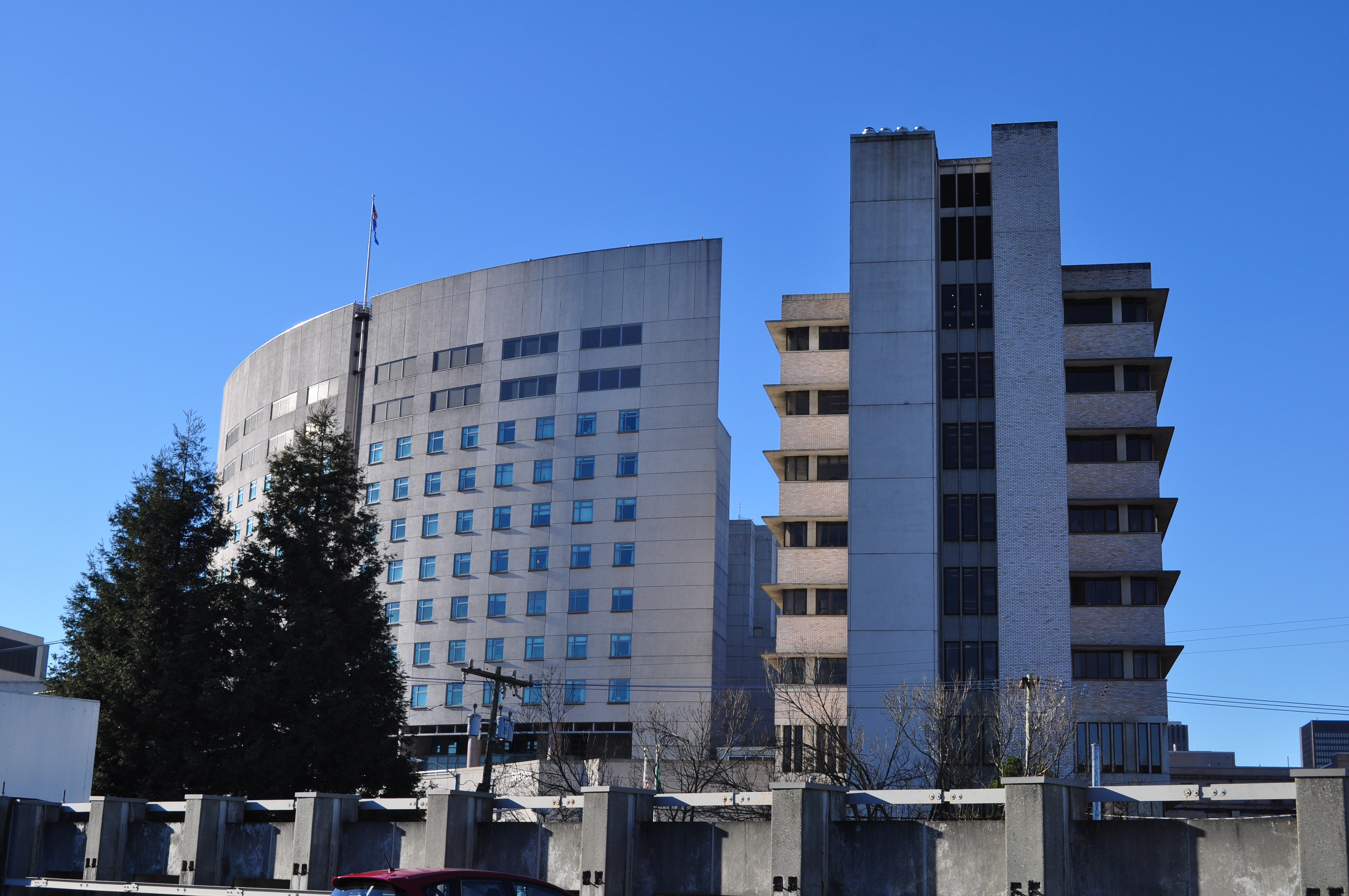
- Swedish campus in Seattle's First Hill neighborhood

Geography
- Location: First Hill, Cherry Hill, Ballard, Seattle, Washington, US; Edmonds, Issaquah, Mill Creek, Redmond, Washington, US
- Coordinates: 47.6090°N 122.3228°W

Organisation
- Care system: Private, non-profit
- Type: Full-service inpatient and outpatient medical and surgical tertiary care, primary care, emergency and urgent care, palliative care

Services
- Emergency department: Yes
- Beds: 668

History
- Founded: 1910

Links
- Website: swedish.org

Swedish Health Services (formerly Swedish Medical Center) is a nonprofit healthcare provider in the Seattle metropolitan area. It operates five hospital campuses (in the Seattle neighborhoods of First Hill, Cherry Hill and Ballard, and the cities of Edmonds and Issaquah), ambulatory care centers in the cities of Redmond and Mill Creek, and Swedish Medical Group, a network of more than 100 primary-care and specialty clinics.

Founded as a nonprofit hospital in First Hill, Seattle in 1910, the then-named Swedish Hospital was formed by 11 Swedish Americans who wanted to offer care that incorporates the medical advances seen in other parts of the country. As of 2021, it employs more than 3,800 physicians and handles more than two million outpatient visits per year. The hospital network has been owned by the Catholic healthcare system Providence Health & Services since 2012.

== History ==
Dr. Nils August Johanson founded Swedish Hospital in 1910 as Seattle's first modern nonprofit medical facility. Dr. Johanson was an immigrant from Sweden and was the father-in-law of Seattle businessman Elmer Nordstrom. After returning from attending medical school at the University of Denver, he was disappointed by the facilities and the thinking in Seattle's hospitals, particularly those related to germ control and surgical techniques. In 1932, Swedish opened the first cancer-care center west of the Mississippi. The board of trustees for Swedish Hospital were historically of Swedish descent until the election of two non-Swedish-American doctors in 1968.

Swedish originally started with its First Hill campus, but began to expand its network by merging with Seattle General Hospital (founded 1895) and the Doctors Hospital (founded 1944) in May 1978. Swedish then expanded outside First Hill when it purchased Ballard Community Hospital in the Seattle district of Ballard (founded 1928) on July 1, 1992. The Ballard purchase was followed up with that of Providence Seattle Medical Center (founded 1876) in the Central District from Providence Health & Services in February 2000. After a decade, Swedish began expanding outside Seattle and King County with its lease of Stevens Hospital (founded January 26, 1964) Edmonds on September 1, 2010, and the opening of a brand-new campus in Issaquah in July, 2011.

In 2009, Swedish partnered with The Polyclinic to implement electronic health records, and in 2012, it became a division of Providence Health & Services. In 2014, Swedish formed new partnerships with Group Health Cooperative and Pacific Medical Centers.

=== Catholic affiliation ===
Swedish Health Services is owned by the Catholic healthcare system Providence Health & Services. In 2012, Swedish and Providence announced that the two hospital systems would form an alliance, with both organizations citing their own staffing challenges caused by budget shortfalls as the reason. Swedish emphasized that it would remain a nonreligious organization, although the formerly independent Swedish would become a division of Providence. Around the same time of the merger announcement, Swedish also stopped performing elective abortions "out of respect for the affiliation", and offered to instead underwrite a Planned Parenthood center adjacent to its Seattle hospital.

The Catholic affiliation came under scrutiny in 2020 when Virginia Mason Medical Center, another major Seattle hospital network, announced that it would merge with the faith-based Catholic Health Initiatives and similarly cease elective abortions. Before the merger, 41 percent of all Washington state hospital beds were already located in Catholic facilities. During the 2022 abortion protests, Swedish issued a statement clarifying that it is not bound by the Conference of Catholic Bishops’s Ethical and Religious Directives and would continue to offer birth control.

=== COVID-19 pandemic ===
During the early days of the COVID-19 pandemic in March 2020, the hospital administration threatened to fire an anesthesiologist for wearing a surgical mask while walking in the hallway. The hospital has since backed down. It also required workers infected with coronavirus to exhaust sick and vacation time before granting them 80 hours of emergency time off.

Swedish Medical Center is one of only seven hospitals in Washington that can perform extracorporeal membrane oxygenation, and accepted patients with extreme cases of COVID-19 during the pandemic. The hospital is performing clinical trials of Tocilizumab to counter the effects of a cytokine storm, an extreme immune reaction that occurs in the most extreme cases of COVID-19.

== Notable staff ==
Since May 15, 2023, Dr. Elizabeth Wako has served as Swedish's chief executive officer.

== Sources ==
- Nordstrom, Katharine Johanson; Marshall, Margaret (2002) My Father's Legacy: The Story of Doctor Nils August Johanson, Founder of Swedish Medical (University of Washington Press) ISBN 978-0295982656
