= Off-price =

Retail format based on discount pricing

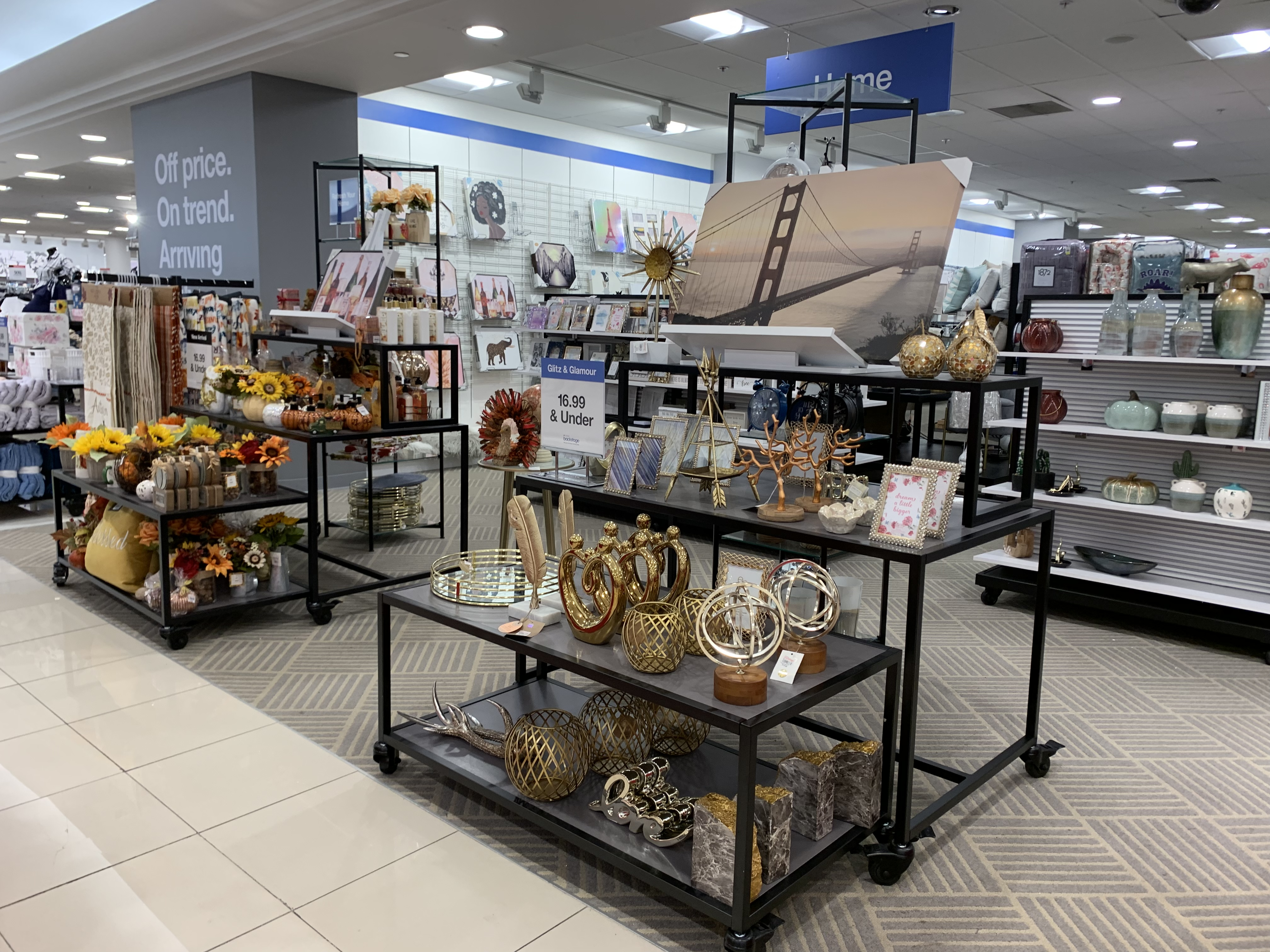
A Macy's outlet in 2019

Off-price is a trading format based on discount pricing. Off-price retailers are independent of manufacturers and buy large volumes of branded goods directly from them. The off-price retail model relies on the purchase of over-produced, or excess, branded goods at a lower price, thus being able to sell to consumers at a discount compared to other stores which purchased an initial run. Among the largest retailers of this type are TJX and Ross Stores. The model is more common in countries that import fashion-oriented or household goods, as the discount role in producer countries is usually filled by factory outlets or small-scale open-air marketplaces.

== Characteristic features ==
The term applies to fashion retail. Off-price is different from other special pricing formats (such as outlet store and discount store) in that one store might contain a great deal of products, price rates and trademarks. The range of goods is usually measured in millions of product items, whereas the quantity of brands represented is measured in thousands. The discount amount is 60-65% on average, reaching up to 90% of the initial price of similar products in brand stores of their respective trademarks and multi-brand boutiques.

== Quality and product origins ==
Off-price retailers sell products by popular brands, purchased directly from their trademark owners, distributors and manufacturers. This model keeps off-price networks protected from goods of unknown origin, guarantees their quality and ensures competitive pricing when placed beside other points of sale. Off-price retailers buy overproduced or unsold goods, showroom remnants of collections from their respective brand owners or brand stores and distributing networks under certain terms and conditions in order to offer them to their final consumer with the lowest possible markup. As a rule, off-price retailers purchase huge supplies consisting of various products from their respective brand owners, with no strict requirements to the depth of their lineup (having all sizes available in stock) and collection completeness, which enables them to get more profitable terms for deals.

== Consumer motivation ==
Traditionally, shopping in off-price stores is referred to by the term "treasure hunt", reflecting the concept of the format: customers searching for original branded products at their lowest ever price. This behavioral model is a symptom of a global trend of "smart shopping"; the customer's focus being on getting the largest financial benefits possible while buying high-quality products of the actual models.

== History ==
The origins of the off-price format are generally considered to be rooted in the U.S.A. The industry can be traced back to the year 1909, when a special shopping area was opened in a ground-floor at a famous Boston department store, Filene's. It was called Filene's Basement and used for selling commodity surplus. Edward Filene, a son of the store's founder, developed an "automatic price-reduction schedule" for it. The products were supplied to the basement with a discount tag, but in especially settled periods of time their price was lowered even further: after 12 days the price would be lowered by 25%, in 18 days – by 50%, in 24 days – by 75%, and finally, after the 30th day, the goods would be given away at no charge at all to charity. The area itself was both well lit and properly designed, and it had hired its own separate floor staff. Filene's Basement was very popular among local residents and tourists, and most of its goods sold out within the first 12 days. Although the idea of a "beneficial basement" wasn't new – since a similar concept had been used in 1879 by Marshall Field, – it was Filene's Basement which brought fame to it and promoted it as an innovative way to make sales. Filene's Basement eventually evolved into an off-price network of 20 hypermarkets that would exist until the year 2009. The schedule of automatic price reduction initially invented for the store in the early 20th century was also used by him for quite a few decades after.

By the middle of the 20th century, the U.S. would witness the wide popularization of similar "basement sales" at other malls, as well as so-called “factory sales”, when vacant factory rooms were used for the discounted sale of over-produced goods. From 1930-1950 the textile and sewing industries in the U.S.A. underwent a period of rapid growth. During WW1 and WW2 the U.S.A. became isolated from the major European suppliers of textile and sewing machinery - and, as such, domestic manufacturing began to increase. In the 50s, a huge amount of clothing, footwear and other sewn products were manufactured locally, and by the end of the season factories were prepared to announce substantial cut-offs and sell the unsold remnants on their own. Small business entrepreneurs would buy products out at wholesale prices and arranged their own retail sales in vacant factory workshops and other rooms that were cheap enough to rent. As their businesses grew, they expanded by moving to department stores or indeed building their own stores.

=== 1950-60s ===
In 1956, U.S. businessman Alfred Marshall put together a think tank of entrepreneurs and suggested the launch of a start-up with the concept of “brands at lower prices”. Having observed a post-war economic boom and the development of the American suburbs, they decided to capitalise on these phenomena to establish new business. They opened a self-service department store in Beverly in order to propose clothing and household products at tempting lower prices. Part of the area was given away to be subleased by third-party footwear, accessories and active sport product dealers, but that division wasn't visible to customers. The department store was at peak popularity, and in about 10 years, Marshalls became an off-price networking headliner in the United States with just two dozen stores.

In the mid 1950s the countrywide famous network of Bell Hosiery Shops (a trader of knitwear that had reached nearly 60 department stores by 1946) began to experience success through its own “factory sales”, introduced due to wide expansion causing decline in their regular network sales. Consequently, the owners of Bell Hosiery Shops opted for discounting as their major sales strategy. They decided not to continue setting up discount stores at factories, instead choosing to begin opening new stores in malls or their own outlets. Their first hypermarket, boasting a total area of 5,000 square feet (460 m^{2}), celebrated its opening in Hyannis, Massachusetts, in July 1956. It was named Zayre. A few months later a second hypermarket was established in Boston. Its area was approximately 39,000 square feet (3,600 m^{2}). By 1959, the company had opened six stores all under the Zayre name, and by early 1962 their number reached 27. The same year, Zayre Corp became a public company and commenced trading on the New York stock exchange. By late 1966, the network had grown to 92 stores all over the United States. Shoppers could find lowered price tags on knitwear, toys, sports products, books, health & beauty products and many more categories. In 1965, the store “Hit or Miss” was opened. It sold high-quality women's wear at discounted prices. Zayre Corp, aware of this new concept store and its rapid growth, took over Hit and Miss in 1969 with a view to maintaining their own fashion aspirations.

=== 1970-90s ===
Due to the volatility of the U.S. economy in the 1970s and the recession that had brought about significant change in customers' attitude to expenses, the off-price industry was gaining considerable momentum. By buying surplus goods from manufacturers at the end of each season, off-price networks would offer fashionable branded goods at 20-60% lower than department stores. The “Hit or Miss” network belonging to Zayre Corp was growing so fast that Zayre considered the opportunity of expanding its off-price business. They even made a failed attempt to buy the Marshalls network that had also achieved fame as an off-price retailer. Zayre then hired a Marshalls ex manager, Bernard Cammarata, to create a clone of Marshalls. TJ Maxx, the name of this store, was opened in March 1977 – and it was followed by a series of other openings for the brand-new network. These stores became popular, offering quality clothes at reasonable prices and a constantly updated range of products to the US's growing population.

A few years after these events, Zayre Corp began to develop yet another line of business, – by providing customers with the opportunity to purchase goods through catalogues via the postal service. Zayre established the Chadwick's Boston co., and Home Club, Inc. networks of household appliance stores in 1985. So there the corporation included a few networks, such as Zayre discounters for customers with low and medium level of income; TJ Maxx, Hit or Miss, and Chadwick's Boston for clients with medium income and higher.

By 1986, the number of “Hit or Miss” stores in the United States had reached 420, and their sales had grown to 300 million dollars. Nearly 70% of its product assortment was brands with nationwide recognition, while the remaining 30% was manufactured under the Hit or Miss label. The network managed to keep price tags at 20-50% lower than most specialized stores ever did. In 1987, TJX was founded to manage the companies. In 1988, Zayre decided to concentrate its efforts on maintaining their off-price direction. It sold all of its network, consisting of nearly 400 Zayre stores, and the label itself to the competitive discounter network Ames Department Stores Inc. for 431.4 million, and by 1990, all Zayre stores were closed or converted into ones under the Ames brand. Meanwhile, in 1976, Marshalls was acquired by Melville Corp. By then, the network had 36 stores in operation. With its new owner, growth surged; by the year 1995, it owned 496 stores in the US and Hawaii. In 1995, TJX Corporation bought out Marshalls – (now of Melville Corporation) by signing a bargain contract worth 606 mln dollars.

In 1972, a company called Burlington was founded. The first store of the network appeared in Burlington, NJ, when the librarian Henrietta Millstein persuaded her husband to acquire a former factory outlet at 675 thousand dollars, by making a down payment of 75 thousand dollars that she had saved through her work. In 1975, the company opened its second store. By 1983, the network had reached 31 shopping points. In 2006, it was acquired by Bain Capital Partners at 2 billion dollars and proceeded with its vigorous development. Right after Burlington was founded in 1975, one more player arrived to the US market – Nordstrom Rack, which opened in the basement area of the Nordstrom department store in downtown Seattle, WA. As the Nordstrom stores network grew, off-price Nordstrom Rack stores followed their success.

In 1982, the Ross Stores network in the US, owner of 6 department stores, changed their format on passing to a new owner and began to grow as an off-price retailer. In just three years, the network expanded to 107 stores, and by the year 1996, it consisted of nearly 300 department stores with its annual revenue reaching 1.5 billion dollars.

In Europe, the off-price format appeared only a few decades after showing up in the United States. The first continental store of the kind appeared in 1976 under the “Le Soldeur” trademark, opening in the town of Laval, Western France. The then founder of the company, Remy Adrion, bought a huge supply of clothing directly from a factory on the brink of closure. This brought about the company “NOZ”; the first European off-price retailer. Gradually, Adrion widened the range of products on offer and increased the number of stores. By 1987, he had founded 10 stores in France with his own logistical platform. In 1992, state regulation changed to prohibit the use of the term 'solde' in commercial organization names, and the network changed its trademark into NOZ.

=== 21st century ===
As of 2018 there are more than 8,000 retail off-price stores in operation worldwide, within the 20 largest off-price networks (their total number equivalent to dozens and even a few thousand stores). The global turnover of the segment as of the year 2017 is more than 60 billion dollars (approx. 2% of the whole fashion industry volume, including segments of luxury products, sport clothing and footwear as well).

The global leader of the sector is TJX, as of 2026 owning more than 5,200 off-price stores (the total area is more than 110 million square feet), split between its 7 retail networks (TJ Maxx, TK Maxx, Marshalls, Winners, HomeGoods, Homesense, & Sierra) in nine different countries (U.S.A., Canada, Australia, Great Britain, Ireland, Germany, Poland, Austria and The Netherlands). Annual net sales of the corporation in 2018 was valued at almost 39 billion dollars. From 2013-2017 inclusive, annual revenue of the company grew by an average of 2 billion dollars (building in 2013's revenue of 26 billion dollars), and its number of hypermarkets grew by 27% (or 855 stores). The 2nd largest off-price store remains Ross Stores, a company which at the very beginning of 2019 possessed more than 1,700 stores, the majority of which are in U.S.A. and Canada. Annual net sales of the company, according to 2018 results, reached almost 15 billion dollars (and since 2013 to 2018 it has grown by 38%). In the United States and Canada there are more than 6,700 off-price format retail stores. In Europe, there are about 1,500 off-price retailer stores, most of them belonging to the 3 biggest networks: 540 to TK Maxx (inclusive in TJX), and more than 300 to the huge French off-price retailer NOZ. More than 250 stores belong to the Russian off-price network Familia. Cumulative off-price retail turnover in Europe, including the revenue from network online shops exceeds 5 billion euros. In Asia the off-price segment is still not that widely developed compared to Europe and America.

==== North America ====
In the US, where according to 2018 statistics there are more than 6,300 off-price retail stores, the cumulative market segment is valued at 50 billion dollars, and it currently exceeds 80% of the world off-price market segment. Most of the stores belong to TJX and form part of TJ Maxx, Marshalls and Home Goods. The second largest off-price operator in the U.S.A. is Ross Stores Company. This segment is also represented by the networks of Burlington, Nordstrom Rack, Tuesday Morning, Century 21, Saks Off 5th and Macy's Backstage. As of 2018 TJ Maxx unites over 1,200 stores in different states of the U.S.A. In Marshalls – there are over 1,000 stores. Both networks are managed by Marmaxx co., which is the biggest fashion operator in the U.S.A according to volume of sales. TJ Maxx and Marshalls (as well as other networks included in TJX) offer discounts of 20-60% compared to regular retailers. Their suppliers are more than 20,000 companies from 100 countries worldwide. These networks have similar product assortments mainly based around clothing, footwear, accessories, similar stores in their area size and design, but in TJ Maxx one might find trademarks belonging to a higher pricing segment and a wider lineup of jewelry and accessories. In Marshalls a greater range of footwear is available along with clothes for men and young men. TJ Maxx launched a web store launched in 2009. Initially it only sold baggages, but it gradually widened its assortment to include clothing, footwear, jewelry, accessories and household appliances. Cumulative turnover of both networks according to 2017 statistics was more than 22 billion dollars. One more related network in the U.S.A. is HomeGoods, which has existed since 1992 and specialises in selling products for the household: furniture, lighting, kitchen utilities, carpets and mats, textiles and deco products. As of 2018, there are more than 700 stores in different towns of the U.S.A. One more subdivision of TJX that works in the off-price segment in the US, is Sierra Trading Post. It specialises in online sales, trading via catalogues, and according to 2018 statistics it operates 30 retail stores to maintain public recognition. The company offers about 3 000 brands in total. It appeared on the market as a catalog seller in 1986, and in 2012 was purchased by TJX for 200 mln dollars. The Company's website has existed since 1998. Already in 2004, it was included in the Top-400 retailers, and in 2005 – 2007, 2010, 2011 – in the Top-500.

Ross Stores is the second off-price network in terms of size and revenue in both the U.S and the world. As of 2018 it owns over 1 600 stores, 1 400 of them operating under the brand Ross Dress for Less and a little more than 200 DD's Discounts. The latter network was founded in 2004 for consumers with a more moderate income than typical Ross Dress for Less customers, and it is represented by goods from more democratic trademarks. Both networks offer clothing, footwear, every kind of accessories, home appliances. The company has more than 8 000 suppliers from various countries all over the world.

Another off-price retailer giant in the US, Burlington, owns, as of 2018, more than 600 retail department stores. The retailer offers clothing, footwear, accessories, jewelry, personal hygiene products, toys, deco products with an off-price discount of 65%. Its revenue was 6 billion dollars according 2017 results.

The off-price network Nordstrom Rack, which sells mostly clothes, footwear, jewelry and cosmetics, operates 240 stores as of 2018. The retailer sells goods by the Nordstrom “mothership” network at a 50-60% discount, and also other brands’ clothes, footwear and accessories with a discount of up to 70%. The company notes that it supplies products to their off-price stores on a daily basis. The Nordstrom off-price turnover as of 2017 is almost 5 billion dollars.

The company Tuesday Morning also operates in the off-price segment. It has existed since 1974 and as of 2018 operates 730 stores in the U.S.A. The network specialises in home deco, gifts and toys. It offers discount pricing of 20-60%, and its annual turnover is 1 billion dollars. The company doesn't have a web store, rather an online showcase.

U.S. Retailer Century 21 network offered clothing, footwear, & well-known brand accessories with a discount of up to 65%. The network began growing in 1961 with a store of 6 000 sq. feet in Manhattan. In 2018, the retailer had 16 retail department stores in the US. Century 21 closed all of its locations by Sunday, December 6, 2020 as a result of Insurance companies failing to financially support the chain during the COVID-19 pandemic.

In 2015 the off-price segment was joined by Macy's, a U.S. network of department stores, established in 1858. First of all, Macy's launched five Macy's Backstage stores, but a year later it changed its approach and began to allocate space to its new label in active Macy's stores. In early 2018 the Company had 72 Macy's Backstages and plans to open a new distributing center for maintaining the off-price direction. Backstage offers mostly the same brands of clothing, footwear, accessories, beauty and wellness goods as offered at Macy's. Discounts are up to 80%.

One more relatively young off-price retailer in the U.S.A. is Saks OFF 5TH network, appearing in the market in 2016. Saks OFF 5TH network operates over 100 stores in the United States, and offers women's, men's and children's clothing and footwear, and also accessories and household products from over 800 premium brands. Off-price is up to 60-70%. The company also runs an online shop.

In Canada the off-price segment is represented by networks mostly within the TJX group: Winners, Marshalls and HomeSense. The biggest one is Winners, formerly the first countrywide retailer in this segment, operational since 1982. In 1990 the Company was taken over by TJX. As of 2018, Winners operates more than 260 stores and offers clothing, footwear, accessories, jewelry, cosmetics and home clothes. The network's off-price falls within the 20-60% bracket off regular prices, though it does not operate sales online. Marshalls in Canada operates 73 offline stores. A division of TJX representing an off-price household goods’ network in the country operates under the brand HomeSense and has 117 stores as of early 2018.

==== Oceania ====
In Australia, the off-price segment is represented by TK Maxx stores. In 2015 TJX acquired the local off-price network Trade Secret, which had operated since 1992 as a network of discounters offering clothes, shoes, accessories and homegoods from international and national brands with discounts reaching up to 60% of the regular retail prices. As of early 2018, there are 38 off-price department stores operating in Australia under TK Maxx brand.

In New Zealand the off-price format appeared in late 2018, when a local group of companies The Warehouse Group, specialising in discount trading, made the decision to open 47 off-price stores branded as Red Rack in one fell swoop. The benefits for customers vary from 20-60%. Brands found in the network include Nike, Adidas, Puma, Superdry, Fenty by Rihanna, Ben Sherman, Billabong and Paul Frank. The company claims to stick to the principle of treasure hunting and it organises weekly replenishment of its product range.

==== Europe ====
So far, the biggest off-price retailer with European roots is NOZ, which operates in France and has over 300 stores within its network, as of 2018. In recent years the company has opened 2 stores per month on average. NOZ offers mainly clothing, accessories, personal hygiene and cosmetics products, food, sports equipment, garden and household products including furniture, electronic appliances, dishes and deco goods. Annual turnover of the company is valued at 500 mln euros, and their suppliers total 110 000. NOZ notes that its purpose is to grow out of Europe into a global leader of the segment.

A large off-price network local to France is Stokomani. Stokomani operates 80 stores with an average area 2000 sq. meters. According to 2017 statistics, the company's revenue was 440 mln euros. In France this segment is also occupied by Mistigriff, established in 1989 and including over 30 stores.

The biggest off-price retailer in Europe nowadays, TK Maxx, part of the U.S. corporation of TJX, showed up on the continent later than other French nationwide off-price networks: the first TK Maxx store was opened in Bristol, England, in 1994. As of 2018 the company owned over 540 department stores in Europe. Nearly 340 stores of those are located in Great Britain and 26 more in Ireland 120 in Germany 40 in Poland 10 in Austria and eight more in the Netherlands. The company also maintains its own online store in Great Britain. HomeSense, another TK Maxx brand, has also operated in the UK since 2008. As of early 2018, the European subdivision of HomeSense totalled 53 stores in Great Britain and two more opened in 2017 in department stores in Ireland. TK Maxx and HomeSense had a cumulative revenue of 4bn euros according to 2017 statistics.

Saks OFF 5TH also claims ambitions in Europe: the company opened its first continental stores in 2017, and as of November 2018 it has seven stores in Germany and two more in the Netherlands.

In the CIS area (Commonwealth of Independent States) the off-price segment as of the year 2018 is dominated by mostly Russian and Ukrainian retail networks. Off-price as an independent format of making sales in Russia started its active development in the early 2000s through company Familia company. As of November 2018 it is the only federal off-price network countrywide. The company began activity in 2000 as a network of department stores providing sales for the whole family and a wide range of clothing and footwear from popular Russian and foreign trademarks. The company gradually transformed into an off-price retailer on honing its strategy based on the work of worldwide off-price giants Ross Stores and TJ Maxx. They adapted their practice to take into account their market's local features. In 2016 Familia was awarded the prize of “No.1 Trademark in Russia” as an off-price network. In 2016, 2017 and 2018 RBC magazine included Familia in the annual list of “Top-50 Most Rapidly Growing Companies in Russia”, and in 2018 it was included in the list of “Top-500 Companies by Revenue in Russia”. As of April 2019 the Company manages more than 250 retail stores in 90 cities of the Russian Federation, their entire shopping area exceeding the total shopping area occupied by fashion retail countrywide by 3.5%. The network stores represent products made by over 7 000 trademarks from 50 countries all over the world. In Ukraine the off-price segment is dominated by the company Red, which opened its first multibrand store in 2004. As of September 2018 the retailer has 10 stores located in Kyiv and Boryspil. Red also hosts a web store of their own. Off-price is offered to customers with benefits of up to 55% off. Take Off is the leader in Eastern Europe for B2B distribution of off-price clothing and accessories from top European brands.

==== Asia ====
In Asia the off-price format is represented weakly due to widespread open marketplaces, factory stores that are able to offer their customers a range of quality goods at the lowest possible prices, and also groundbreaking online sales developments that offer various services. In certain countries new stores or road shows appear from time to time, and the term off-price is actively used along with the advantages of the format to customers. An annual Off-Price Show takes place in the Philippines, for example, which reminds of the U.S. “factory sales” that date back to the mid-20th century. Pop ups have also recently become popular. Mass expansion as in the US, or gradual systematic development as in Russia, has not yet begun. In China there is only one dominant off-price retailer – DX Quality Outlet, which manages pop-up stores along with a web store. As of 2018 the retailer has 38 “pop-ups” and 13 permanent off-price stores, and the company claims to be planning to increase its number of pop-ups – up to the total time of their working which makes 11 thousand days a year.
