= Nordstrom =

American luxury department store chain

Coordinates: 47.61237°N 122.3365°W

Nordstrom, Inc.

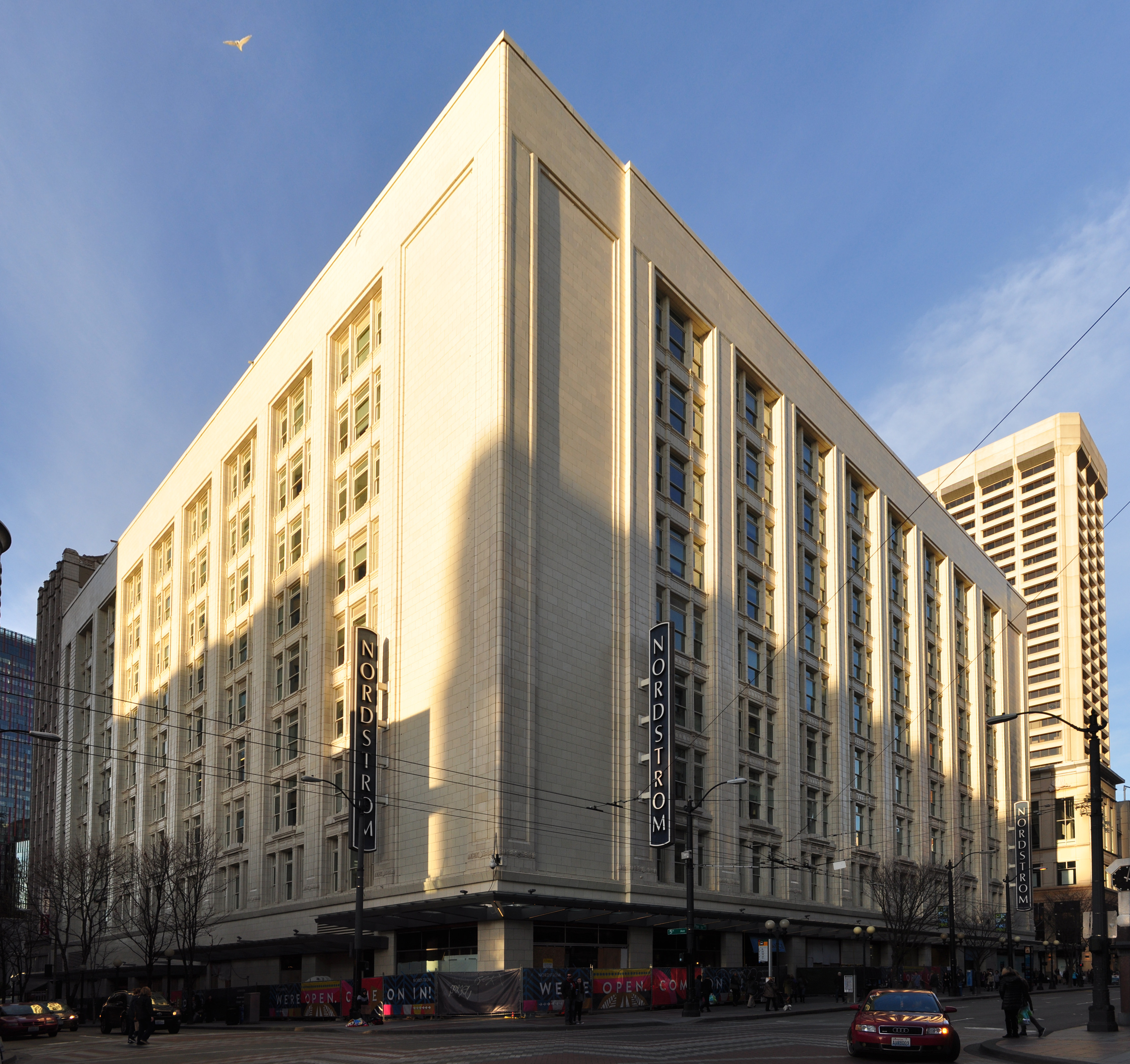
- Flagship store and headquarters in Downtown Seattle in 2016
- Formerly: Wallin & Nordstrom (1901–1922); Nordstrom's (1923–1962); Nordstrom Best (1963–1970)
- Type: Private
- Traded as: NYSE: JWN (1999–2025); Nasdaq: NORD (1971–1999)
- Industry: Retail
- Founded: 1901; 125 years ago in Seattle, Washington, U.S.
- Founders: John W. Nordstrom; Carl F. Wallin
- Headquarters: Seattle, Washington, U.S.
- Number of locations: 386 (2025)
- Area served: United States
- Key people: Bradley D. Tilden (Chairman); Erik Nordstrom (CEO); Peter Nordstrom (President); Jose Gutierrez (CO CEO); Catherine Smith (CFO)
- Products: Clothing; footwear; handbags; jewelry; accessories; cosmetics; fragrances; home furnishings; housewares; appliances; bedding; bath; gifts; wedding; cafe
- Revenue: ▲US$15.02 billion (2024)
- Operating income: ▲US$495 million (2024)
- Net income: ▲US$294 million (2024)
- Total assets: ▲US$8.97 billion (2024)
- Total equity: ▲US$1.14 billion (2024)
- Owner: Nordstrom family (50.1%); El Puerto de Liverpool (49.9%)
- Number of employees: 55,000 (2025)
- Subsidiaries: Nordstrom Rack
- Website: nordstrom.com

Nordstrom, Inc. (/ˈnɔːrdstrəm/) is an American upmarket department store chain headquartered in Seattle, Washington, and founded by John W. Nordstrom and Carl F. Wallin in 1901. The original store operated exclusively as a shoe store, and a second location opened in 1923. The growing chain began selling clothing in 1963, and became the full-line retailer that presently exists by 1971. The company founded its off-price Nordstrom Rack division in 1973, and grew both full-line and off-price divisions throughout the United States in the following years. The full-line division competes with department stores including Bloomingdale's, Dillard's, Neiman Marcus, and Saks Fifth Avenue, while the off-price division competes with retailers including TJX and Ross Stores. Previous expansions beyond the contiguous United States include Puerto Rico (2015–2020) and Canada (2014–2023).

== Early history ==
John W. Nordstrom was born on February 15, 1871, in the village Alvik near Luleå in Northern Sweden. In 1887, Nordstrom immigrated to the United States at the age of 16. His name at birth was Johan Wilhelm Nordström (Swedish pronunciation: [ˈjuːhɑn ˈvɪlhɛlm ˈnuːr(d)strœm]), which he later anglicized to John W. Nordstrom. After landing in New York, he began working in Michigan and was able to save enough money to purchase a 20-acre (81,000 m^{2}) potato farm in Arlington, Washington. In 1897, he joined the Klondike Gold Rush in Canada's Yukon Territory. After two years of prospecting, he finally struck gold, then sold his disputed claim for $13,000. Returning to Seattle with his newfound wealth, he married Hilda Carlson in 1900 and searched for a business venture.

== Operations during 20th century ==
=== Wallin & Nordstrom and Nordstrom Best ===
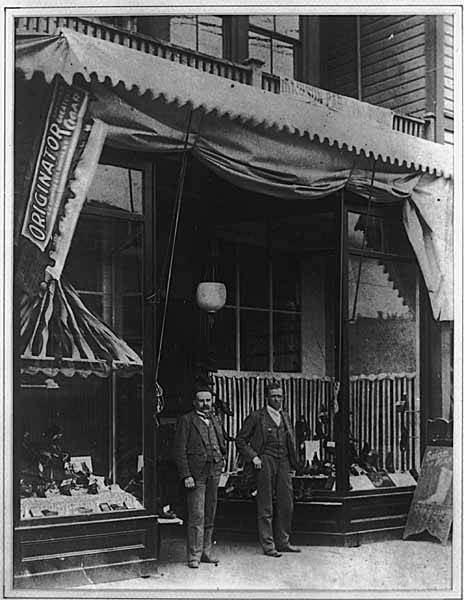
Wallin (left) & Nordstrom (right) in front of their first shop, 318 Pike Street, Seattle, shortly after it opened in 1901

Nordstrom eventually settled on a shoe store that opened in 1901, called Wallin & Nordstrom. Carl F. Wallin, the co-founder of the store, was the owner of the adjacent shoe repair shop. John and Hilda had five children, three of whom would follow him into the family business, Everett W. (1903), Elmer J. (1904) and Lloyd N. Nordstrom.

In 1928, John W. Nordstrom retired and sold his shares to two of his sons, Everett and Elmer. In 1929, Wallin also retired and sold his shares to them. The 1930 grand opening of the remodeled Second Avenue store marked the change of name to Nordstrom. Lloyd Nordstrom subsequently joined the company in 1933, and the three brothers ran the business together for almost forty years.

By 1958, Nordstrom had expanded to eight stores in two states but still sold only shoes. Apparel came with its purchase of Best's Apparel of Seattle in 1963, and the company's name was changed to Nordstrom Best.

=== Following renaming to Nordstrom ===
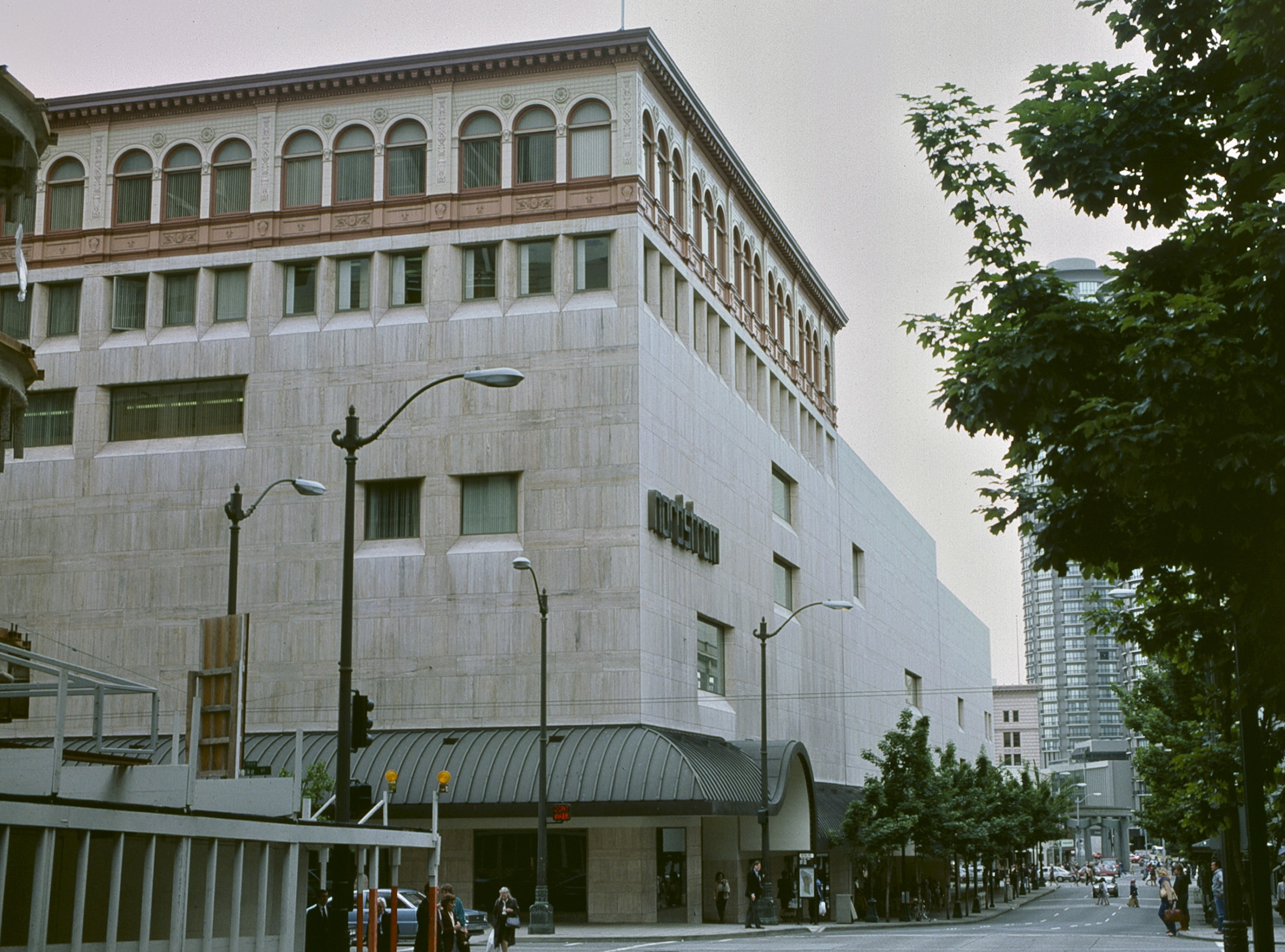
Exterior of the original Nordstrom flagship store in Seattle (1984)

In 1971, the company was taken public on National Association of Securities Dealers Automated Quotations (NASDAQ). It was one of the first companies to be listed on the then-newly established stock exchange. It was moved to the New York Stock Exchange in 1999 under the ticker symbol JWN after John W. Nordstrom, its founder.

Their business continued beyond stores in 1974. On December 5, the National Football League announced the signing of a franchise agreement that would put a team in Seattle, Washington. Representing the family as majority partner of the consortium was Lloyd W. Nordstrom. However, he would never see a game as owner, as he died of a heart attack on January 20, 1976, eight months before the newly christened Seattle Seahawks took the field. With his death, the estate of Mr. Nordstrom would oversee the team, with co-owner and entrepreneur Herman Sarkowsky serving as the team's first chief operating officer.

By 1975, Nordstrom expanded into Alaska (the only time by acquisition) by purchasing Northern Commercial Company and opened its first Nordstrom Rack clearance store in Seattle. A strong northwest regional retailer with sales already approaching $250 million making it the third-largest specialty retailer in the United States, the company opened its first Southern California store at South Coast Plaza in Costa Mesa in 1978. By the early 1990s, it had opened 26 stores plus Racks in California. Subsequent expansion relied on creating a strongly decentralized regional structure, beginning with the Northeast in the Tysons Corner Center in Virginia (1988), the Midwest in the Oakbrook Center in Illinois (1991), the Southeast in Atlanta (1998), and the Southwest in Dallas (1996). In a new region, the initial store was used as a base for training and recruitment for subsequent expansion, and was usually backed by its own distribution center. From 1978 to 1995, Nordstrom opened a total of 46 full-line department stores.

In 1976, Nordstrom opened a series of stores called Place Two to sell a more limited selection of apparel in smaller markets. By 1983, there were ten Place Two stores, but the cost of upgrading the smaller stores, especially from a systems perspective, outweighed the benefit, and the division was discontinued. The last two remaining Place Two stores closed on April 1, 1995. In August 1988, the Nordstroms sold the Seahawks to real estate developer Ken Behring and his partner Ken Hofmann for $80 million.

The company also expanded into direct sales in 1993, beginning with a catalog division led by John N.'s son Dan that was followed by an e-commerce business. Nordstrom.com's fulfillment and contact centers are located in Cedar Rapids, Iowa; and Seattle, Washington. Currently, it has distribution centers in Ontario, California; Newark, California; Portland, Oregon; Dubuque, Iowa; Upper Marlboro, Maryland; and Gainesville, Florida.

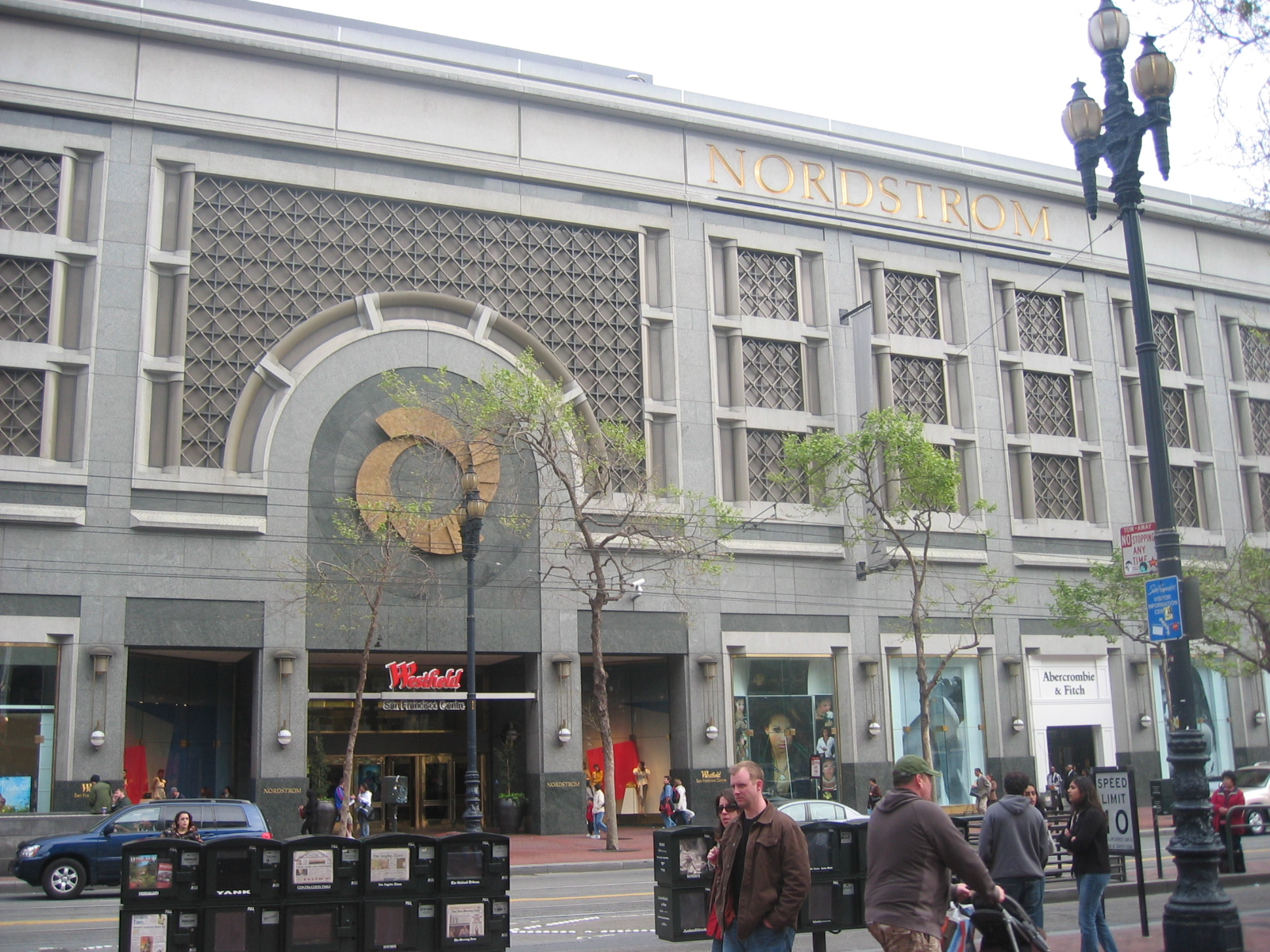
Exterior of the Nordstrom store at Westfield San Francisco Centre in San Francisco, California (2007)

Nordstrom FSB, a wholly owned subsidiary of Nordstrom, Inc., is a federally chartered savings bank doing business as Nordstrom Bank. It was formed in 1991 in Scottsdale, Arizona, with its customer contact center in Centennial, Colorado. Nordstrom FSB was formerly known as Nordstrom National Credit Bank and changed its name to Nordstrom FSB in March 2000. The bank offers various banking and credit products, such as Nordstrom Signature VISA, Nordstrom retail credit and debit cards, interest-bearing checking accounts, check cards, and certificates of deposits. It offers Nordstrom customers cards under Nordstrom Rewards – its customer loyalty program – where customers earn points when making purchases with the card at Nordstrom and other retailers.

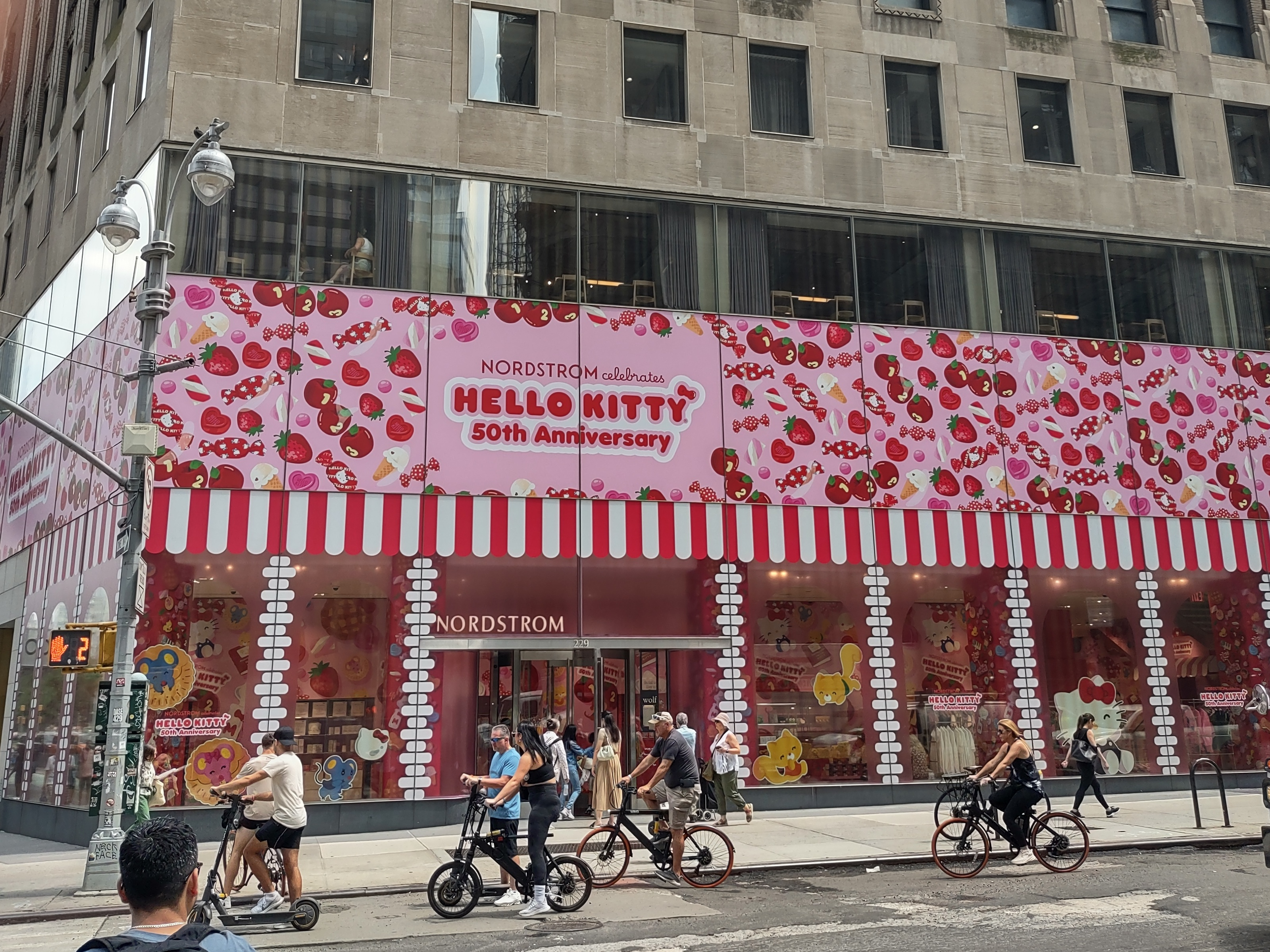
Nordstrom on Broadway, Manhattan

In 1995, Nordstrom opened their first store location in New York State. It is located at The Westchester, an upscale shopping mall in White Plains, New York, a suburb of New York City. Nordstrom has since opened stores at Roosevelt Field in Garden City, New York in 1997, and Manhattan in 2019.

Beginning in 1995, the fourth generation of brothers and cousins had been co-presidents for a time. John Whitacre was appointed as the first non-Nordstrom CEO in 1997. In 1998, Nordstrom replaced its downtown Seattle store with a new flagship location in the former Frederick & Nelson building across the street. A two-year renovation of this location was completed in 2016. At 383,000 square feet (35,600 m^{2}), the downtown Seattle location is the chain's largest store. By contrast, the smallest Nordstrom store, as of September 2008, opened in 1980 in Salem, Oregon, with a total area of just under 72,000 square feet (6,700 m^{2}). This location has since closed.

In 1998, Nordstrom opened its first location in the Southeast at Perimeter Mall in Dunwoody, Georgia.

== Operations during 21st century ==
=== 2000–2009 ===
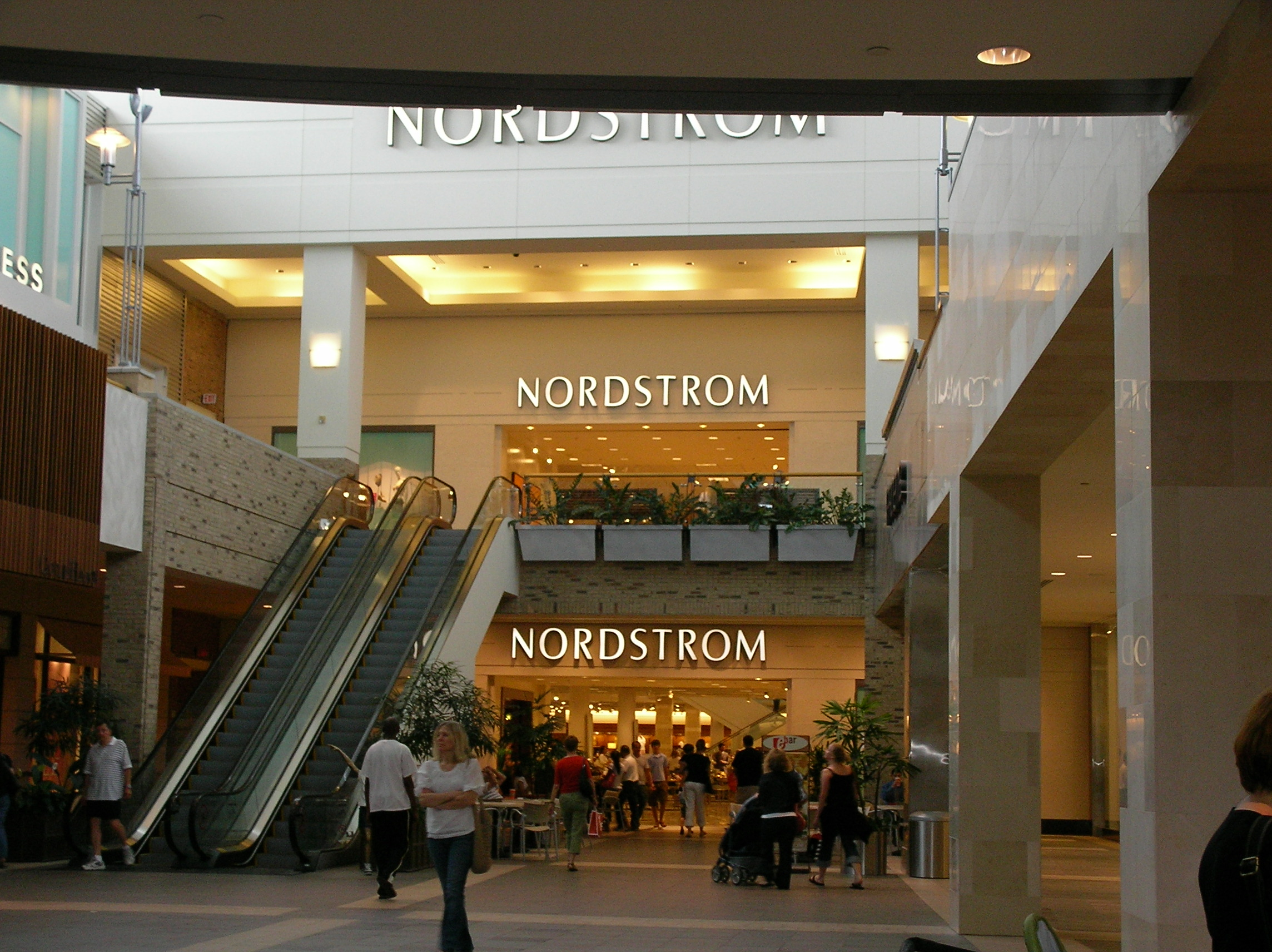
Mall entrances of the Nordstrom store at The Streets at Southpoint in Durham, North Carolina (2009)

In 2000, the Nordstrom family reasserted its control, with the sons of Bruce A. (Blake, Erik and Peter) assuming senior roles in the company which they continue to hold. Blake Nordstrom served as sole President of the company from 2000 to 2014 with Erik and Peter joining him as co-Presidents in 2015. Nordstrom sold its stand-alone boutique chain Façonnable in 2007, though it still offers that label in its lineup.

=== 2010–2019 ===
In February 2011, Nordstrom announced the acquisition of HauteLook, an LA-based online retailer that offers flash sales on designer goods. The deal included Nordstrom paying $180 million in stock and a three-year "earn-out" payment based on HauteLook's financial performance. On May 26, 2011, Nordstrom announced that they would be closing the downtown Indianapolis, Indiana, Circle Center Mall location due to declining business at the site. The remaining location on the north side of the city at the Fashion Mall at Keystone as well as the future Nordstrom Rack store in the Rivers Edge Shopping Center, also on the north side, remained as the only two locations in the state. Erik Nordstrom, president of stores at Nordstrom stated, "We've enjoyed serving our customers in downtown Indianapolis, but unfortunately our business has declined over the long term for some time and despite our efforts to turn things around we don't see the outlook significantly changing."

In August 2011, Nordstrom opened the Treasure & Bond store in SoHo, New York. The store was intended to test the New York high-end retail market, and its profits were donated to charity. The store targeted a younger demographic than Nordstrom’s typical customer base.

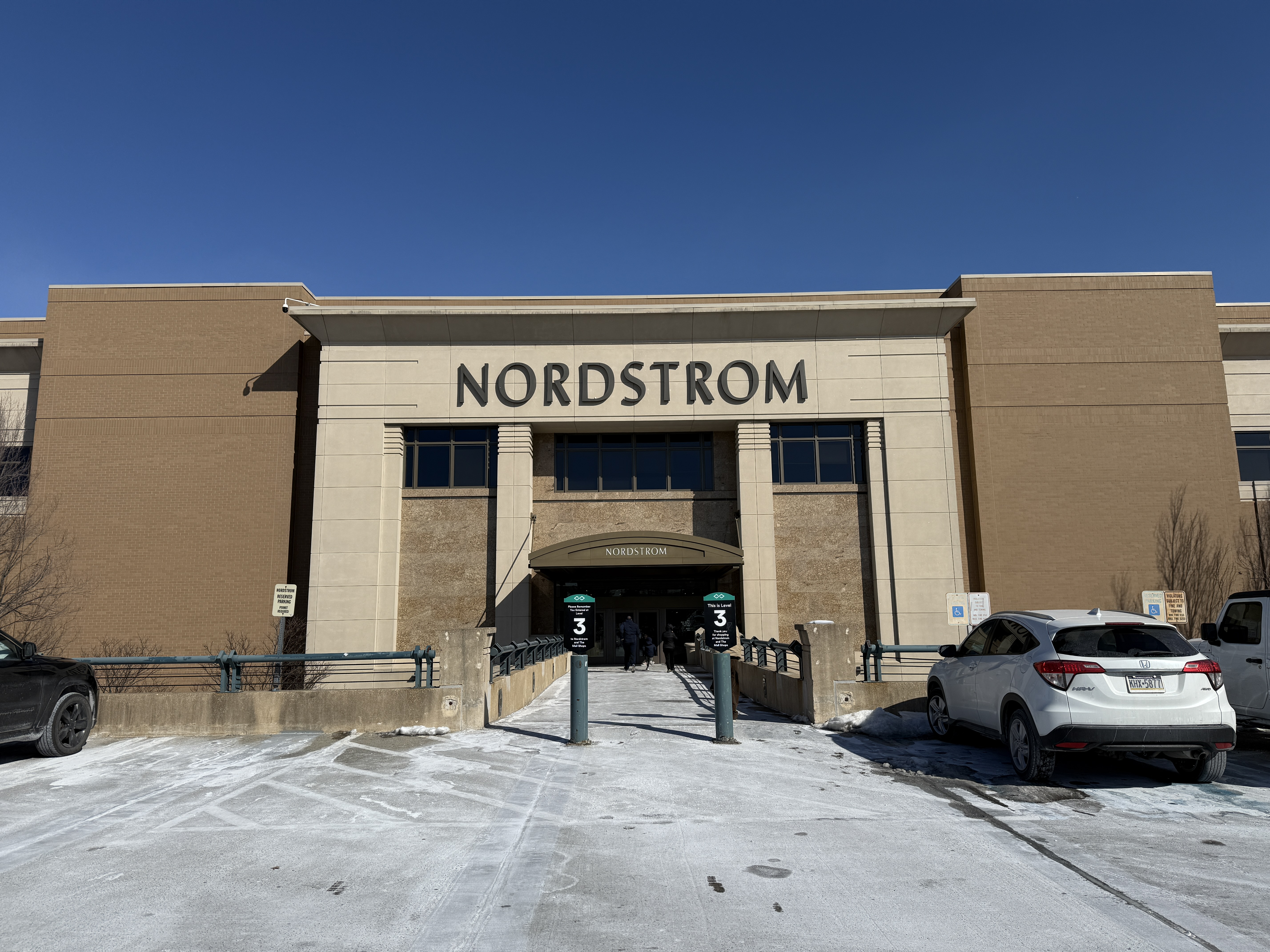
Nordstrom at the King of Prussia Mall in King of Prussia, Pennsylvania

Nordstrom announced plans to open a Nordstrom Rack in Milwaukee in 2014. In late November 2012, Nordstrom announced that they would also be opening a full-line Nordstrom Department Store in 2015 in Milwaukee at Mayfair Mall, a half-mile away from the Nordstrom Rack location. Milwaukee was the largest metropolitan area in the country that did not have a Nordstrom until 2015. Such unmet demand was highlighted in Nordstrom's decision to open in the Milwaukee area.

On January 4, 2013, Nordstrom announced plans for a new location in the Minneapolis-Saint Paul metropolitan region. The store, to be located at the Ridgedale Center, would be the second in the area. Following the success of its Mall of America opening in 1992, Nordstrom sought to expand in the Twin Cities market. Plans for a Ridgedale Center store were first released in 2007, only to be canceled in 2009. The location eventually opened in September 2015.

Nordstrom opened a 138,000-square-foot (12,800 m^{2}), two-level, full-line store March 2015 in The Mall of San Juan in San Juan, Puerto Rico. After Hurricane Maria in 2017, the store suffered major water damage and it closed temporarily after the hurricane. Nordstrom reopened the store on November 9, 2018. On May 7, 2020, Nordstrom announced that it would not reopen due to COVID-19 pandemic, leaving this store closed permanently.

In May 2015, Pete and Erik Nordstrom joined their brother Blake Nordstrom as co-presidents of Nordstrom. This arrangement lasted until Blake Nordstrom's death in January 2019. Before this appointment, Pete Nordstrom was executive vice president and president of merchandising while Erik Nordstrom was executive vice president and president of Nordstrom.com.

Nordstrom opened its first Rack location in Philadelphia in the fall of 2014. In the fall of 2015, Nordstrom opened their first Nordstrom Rack store in Delaware. The company opened its first full-line store in New York City on April 12, 2018, a three-floor store at 57th Street and Broadway, in the Columbus Circle neighborhood.

In 2016, Nordstrom entered into a partnership with Tesla Motors under which the automaker opened retail galleries inside the Nordstrom locations in The Grove, Los Angeles, in SouthPark Mall in Charlotte, North Carolina and in Somerset Collection in Troy, Michigan.

In 2016, Nordstrom began selling products from J. Crew, Olivia Palermo + Chelsea28, Adore Me, and Eloquii. In 2017, Nordstrom announced they would be expanding their natural beauty-focused stations.

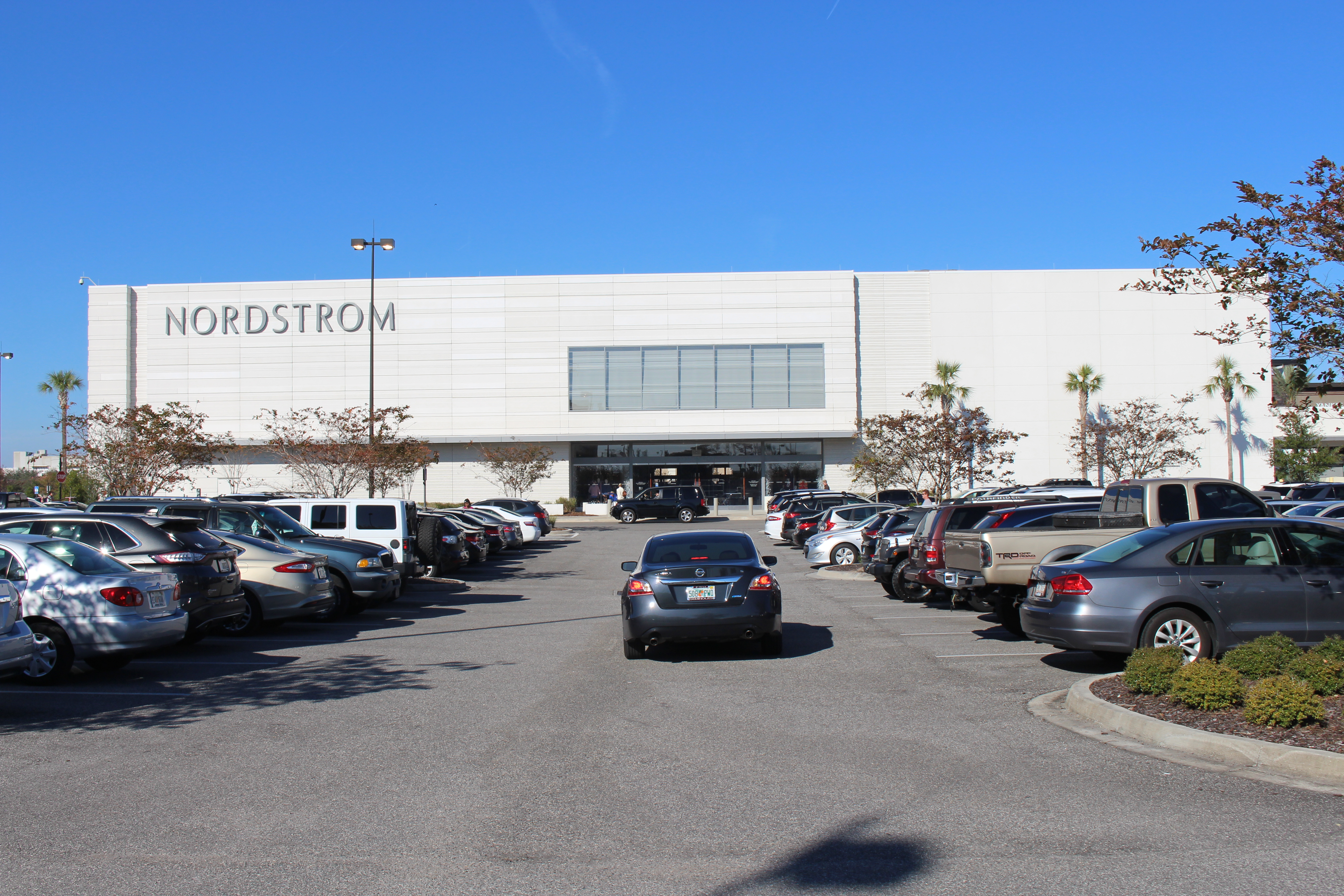
Exterior of the Nordstrom store at St. Johns Town Center in Jacksonville, Florida (2017)

On February 2, 2017, Bloomberg News reported that Nordstrom would cease to carry Ivanka Trump's branded fashion line, citing weak sales. The retailer cuts 10 percent of its most poorly performing brands each year. Nordstrom's action came after a boycott campaign against retailers carrying products having Trump family labels. President Donald Trump responded with a tweet directed at Nordstrom, condemning the brand for its treatment of his daughter. The company's stock dropped by 0.65% in the aftermath of the tweet before ending the day with a gain of more than 4%. Fortune declared this quick recovery to have broken Trump's market-moving "tweet curse".

In October 2017, Nordstrom launched its first "Nordstrom Local" in West Hollywood, which is set to focus on personal shopping and styling, rather than carrying merchandise. In June 2017, Nordstrom Inc.'s founding family, which owned 31.2 percent of the company, said it was looking to take Nordstrom private. In October, the family suspended its efforts, because of trouble completing a financing package. Lenders were asking for 13 percent interest, about twice the typical rate for retailers.

On January 2, 2019 Blake Nordstrom, co-president of Nordstrom, died suddenly at the age of 58. He was a lifetime employee of his family's company, rising through the ranks until he became a vice-president and then co-president. In fiscal year 2019, digital sales reached 33% of total sales, marking a growing transition to online retail.

=== 2020–present ===
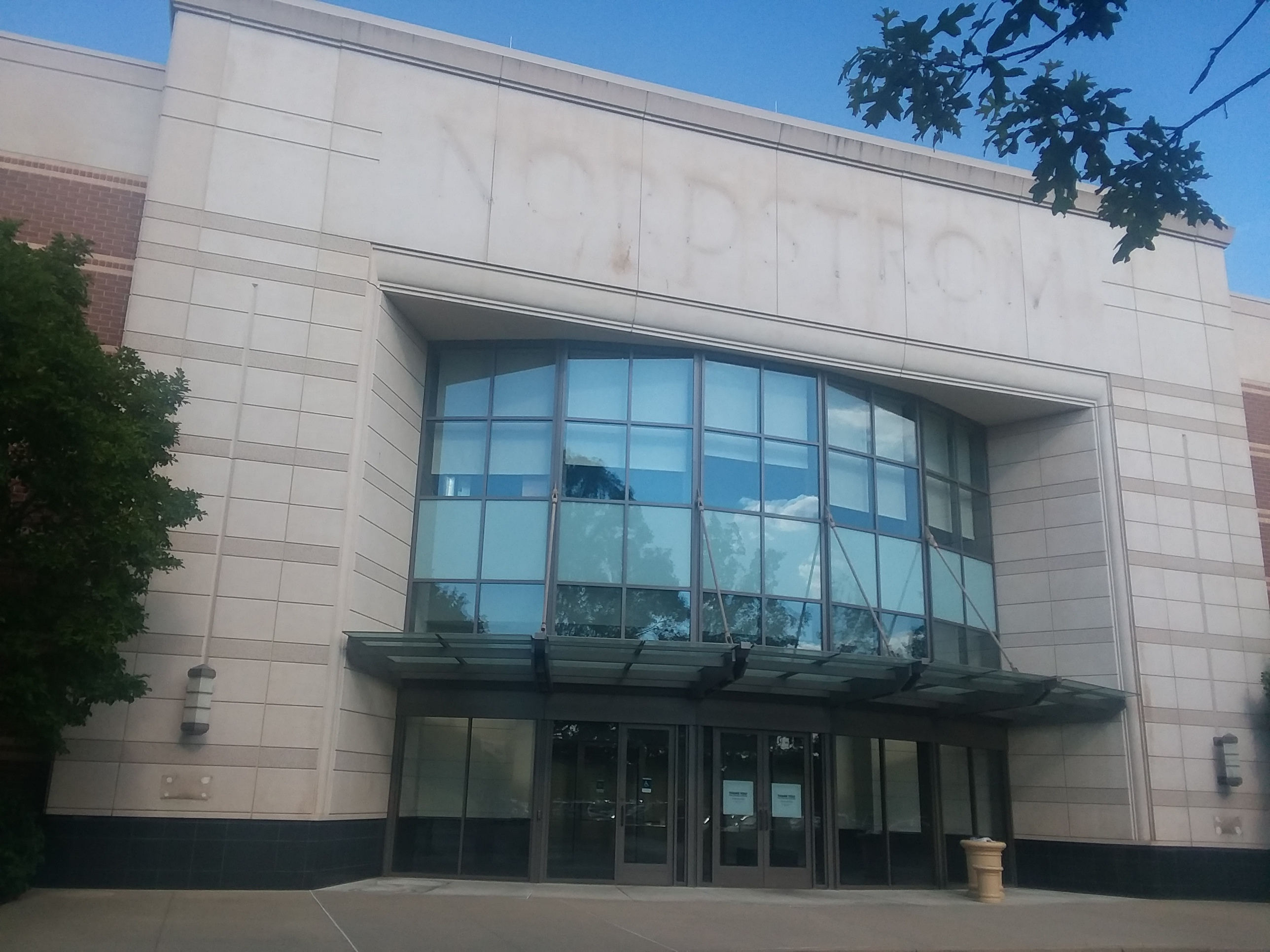
Vacant Nordstrom location at Short Pump Town Center in Richmond, Virginia. This location is among 16 that closed in 2020, citing the economic impact of the COVID-19 pandemic.

On March 3, 2020, Erik Nordstrom became the sole CEO of Nordstrom. On March 16, the company announced that effective the following day, all locations would temporarily close during the COVID-19 pandemic. On May 5, Nordstrom began reopening stores and announced that sixteen locations would permanently close by August. In late September, Nordstrom announced that by the end of 2021, their stores and websites would no longer sell products made from fur or exotic skins. In October 2021, Nordstrom announced an agreement with 11 Honoré, an online retailer of plus-sized designer fashion, to sell the company's clothing in Nordstrom stores and on their website.

On December 23, 2024, Nordstrom announced their plans to take the company private in a deal valued at $6.25 billion. The plan involves selling 49.9% percent of the company to Mexican department store and real estate company El Puerto de Liverpool, with the remaining 50.1% controlling stake being held by the Nordstrom family. On the deal, CEO Erik Nordstrom stated that “Today marks an exciting new chapter for the business. On behalf of my family, we look forward to working with our teams to ensure Nordstrom thrives long into the future.” Nordstrom stock was removed from the New York Stock Exchange on May 20, 2025 when the deal was finalized.

In March 2025 Nordstrom landed in an online controversy where it featured "Indian Souvenir Bag" on its website for $48. Many claimed it as a typical colonizer behavior of rebranding local items and retail it for a higher price. The jhola is actually a sustainable and inexpensive bag rooted in Indian culture with now having pejorative connotations.

==== Design patent dispute with POPFLEX ====
In early 2025, fitness entrepreneur Cassey Ho, founder of the activewear brand POPFLEX, alleged that Nordstrom and the apparel brand Gottex had infringed upon her U.S. design patent for the "Pirouette Skort" (U.S. Patent No. D1,010,983). Ho identified a "Tutu Skort" sold by Nordstrom and Nordstrom Rack as an unauthorized copy of her patented design, which had gained significant visibility after being worn by Taylor Swift in 2024.

Following a cease-and-desist letter from Ho’s legal team, Gottex’s counsel reportedly threatened a counter-lawsuit for tortious interference and unfair competition, arguing that Ho's public allegations were damaging the vendor's commercial relationship with Nordstrom. While Nordstrom subsequently removed the product from its storefronts, Ho stated in August 2025 that she had declined a settlement offer from the parties involved because it required a non-disclosure agreement (NDA) carrying a $250,000 penalty for each subsequent public mention of the dispute. The incident has been cited as a notable example of an independent designer utilizing intellectual property law to challenge "dupe culture" within major retail chains.

== Nordstrom Canada ==
Nordstrom Canada Retail, Inc. Les Detaillants Nordstrom Canada, Inc.

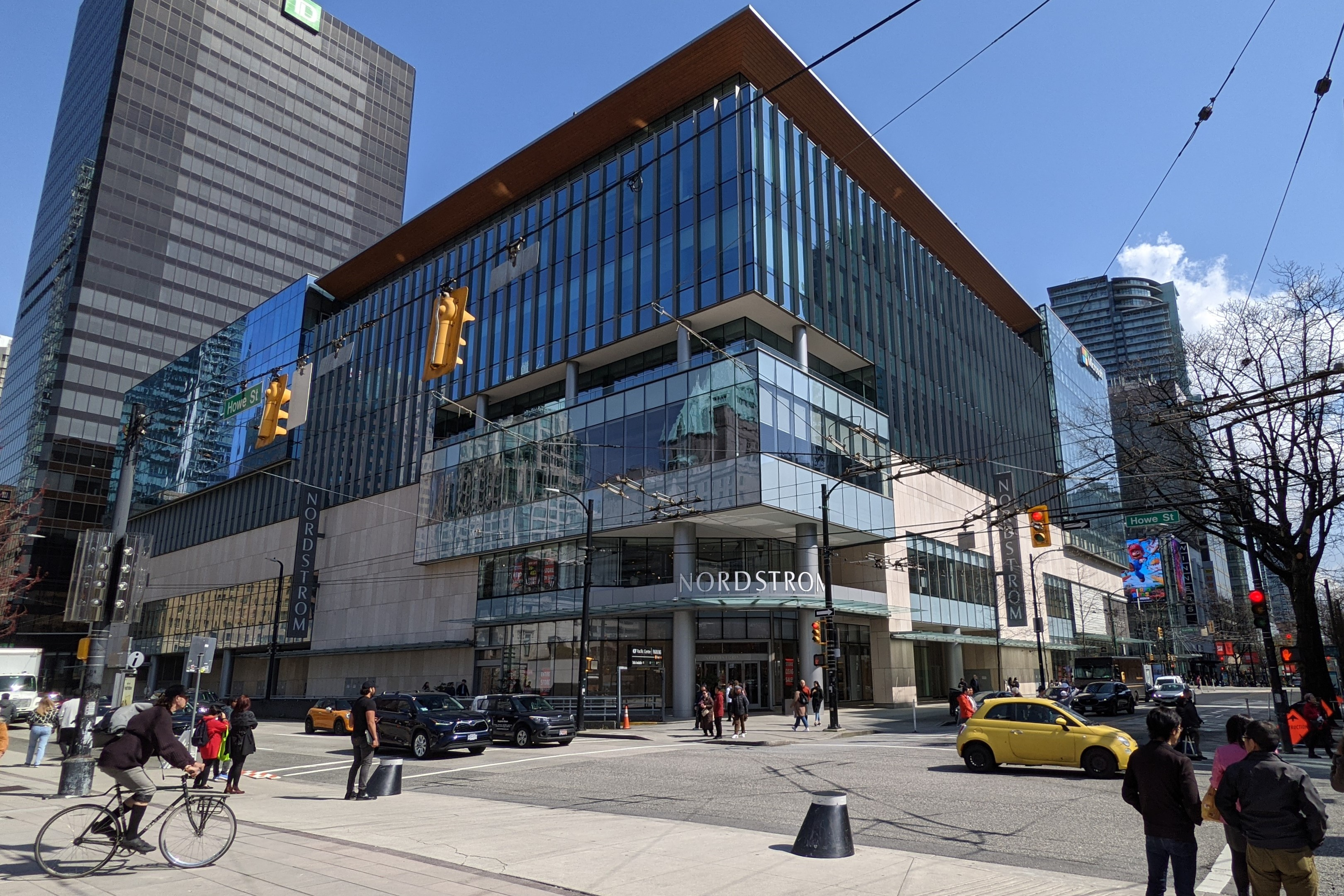
- Pacific Centre flagship store in Vancouver
- Type: Division
- Industry: Retail
- Founded: February 9, 2012; 14 years ago (incorporated); September 19, 2014; 12 years ago (first store)
- Defunct: June 13, 2023; 3 years ago
- Headquarters: Vancouver, British Columbia, Canada
- Number of locations: 6 Nordstrom, 7 Nordstrom Rack (2023)
- Areas served: Alberta; British Columbia; Ontario
- Parent: Nordstrom
- Website: nordstrom.ca

Nordstrom Canada Retail, Inc. (French: Les Detaillants Nordstrom Canada, Inc.) was the Canadian division of Nordstrom. It was announced on September 13, 2012, opened its first store on September 19, 2014, and closed its final stores on June 13, 2023. In this market, it competed with Canadian department stores including Holt Renfrew, Hudson's Bay, and Simons.

Four full-line Nordstrom stores were announced for the first phase of expansion, with nine full-line stores total expected in the long term. Most of these stores were located in vacated Sears Canada storefronts in Cadillac Fairview-managed shopping centers, including Chinook Centre in Calgary; Rideau Centre in Ottawa; Toronto Eaton Centre in Toronto; and Pacific Centre in Vancouver. The stores at the CF-managed Sherway Gardens and the Oxford-managed Yorkdale Shopping Centre in Toronto were new construction. Of the first four stores announced, the Calgary store was the first to open on September 19, 2014. It was followed by the Ottawa store on March 6, 2015; the Vancouver store on September 18, 2015; and the Sherway Gardens store on September 15, 2017. The Yorkdale store was confirmed on April 8, 2013, and opened on October 21, 2016. The Toronto Eaton Centre was the last of the six stores to be announced on January 15, 2014, however, it was the fourth to open on September 18, 2016.

The first Nordstrom Rack opened at Vaughan Mills on March 21, 2018; and then a second location in Deerfoot Meadows in Calgary and a flagship location at One Bloor in Toronto opened on May 3, 2018. Nordstrom Rack opened three other additional stores in Fall 2018; one at Heartland Town Centre in Mississauga, one at Ottawa Trainyards, and finally one at South Edmonton Commons.

On March 2, 2023, Nordstrom announced that they would be closing all their Canadian stores, which would entail 2,500 staff losing their jobs. The company stated, "Despite our best efforts, we do not see a realistic path to profitability for the Canadian business." The closing would be done under court supervision within the framework of the Canadian Companies' Creditors Arrangement Act (CCAA), with the help of a third-party liquidator. Liquidation sales began for all locations on March 21, 2023. All Canadian Nordstrom Rack locations closed on May 14, 2023, while all Canadian full-line stores closed on June 13, 2023.

== Retail formats ==
=== Nordstrom ===
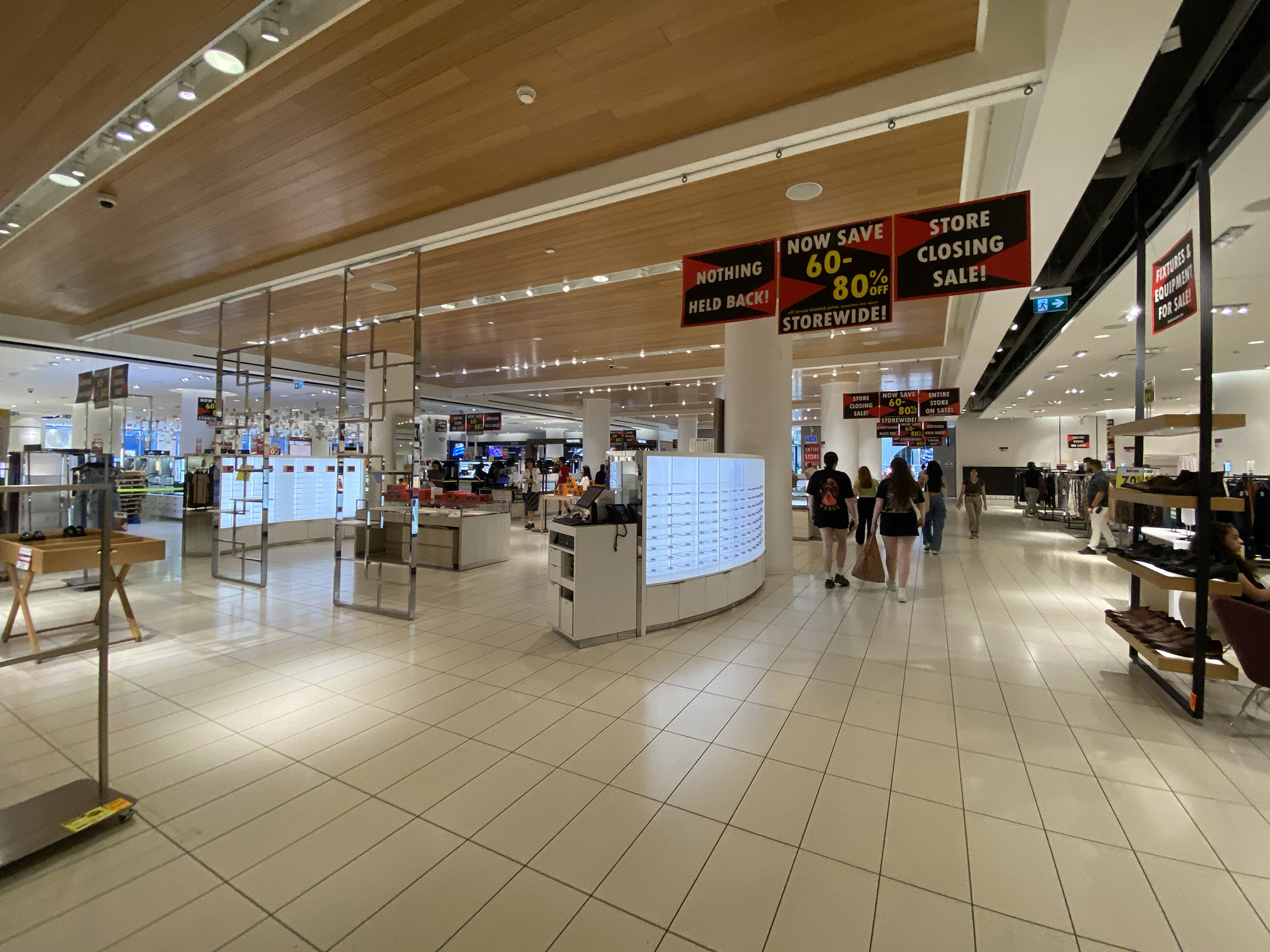
Interior of the Nordstrom in Eaton Centre, Toronto during liquidation in June 2023

As of May 2022, there are 100 full-line Nordstrom department stores, which average 140,000 square feet (13,000 m^{2}).

Nordstrom holds six annual sales. Two of these are Half-Yearly sales, which take place semi-annually in May and late December, as well as three additional seasonal sales. Nordstrom's largest sale event is the Nordstrom Anniversary Sale, which is held each July. Limited amounts of merchandise set to be released for the following fall are sent to Nordstrom stores early, where they are sold at discount. For ten days prior to Anniversary Sale, Nordstrom gives early access to members who make appointments.

==== Nordstrom Local ====
Nordstrom Local service hubs are oriented for amenities including online order pickup, personal styling, and tailoring. They do not have their own inventory, and instead source merchandise from full-line stores as needed. As of May 2022, there are seven Nordstrom Local locations between New York City and Los Angeles, which average 3,000 square feet (280 m^{2}).

==== Restaurants ====
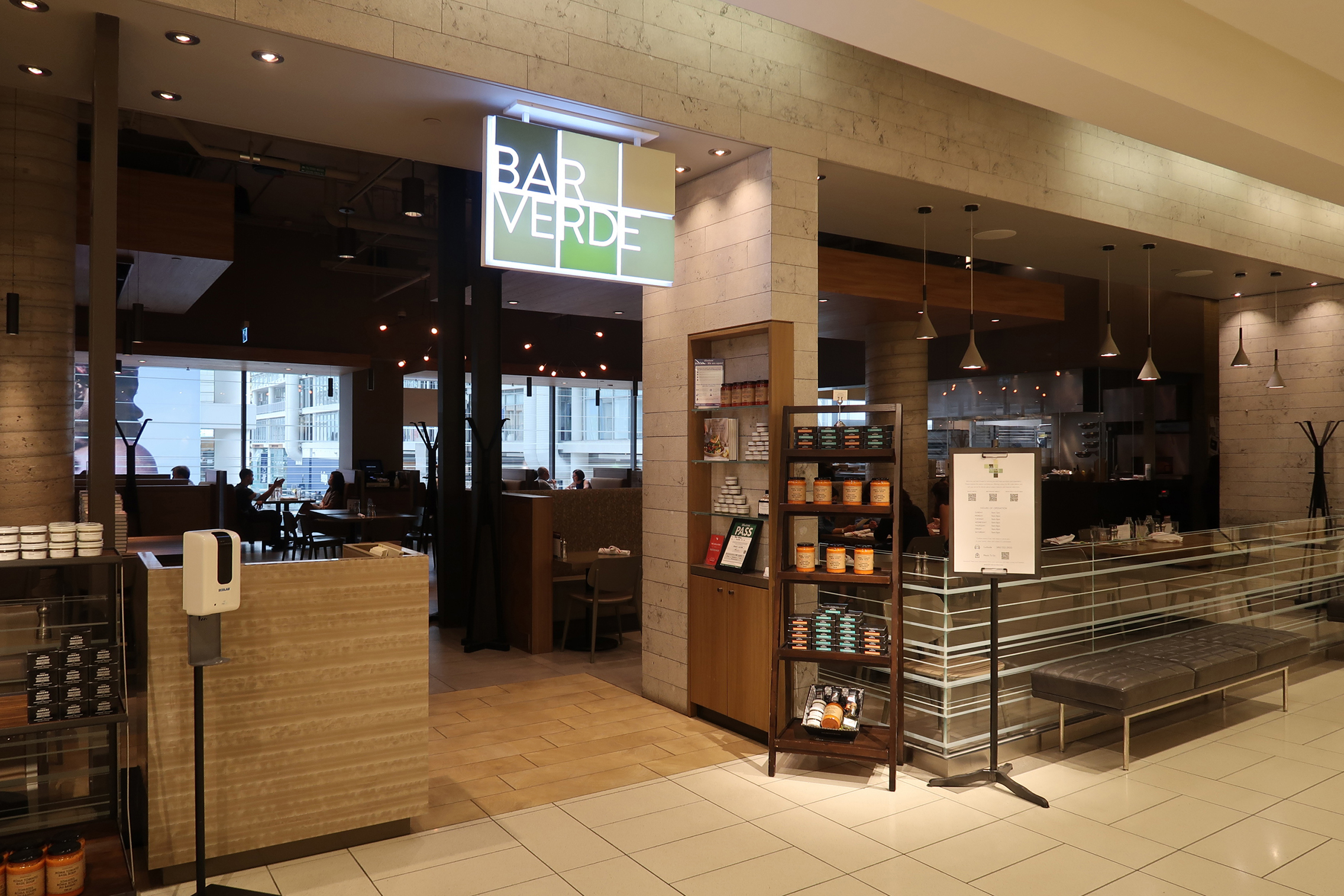
Bar Verde in Eaton Centre, Toronto

Fast casual and full-service restaurants operate within most Nordstrom full-line stores.

List of Nordstrom restaurants
Restaurant	Concept type	Year debuted	Notes
Bar Verde		2013	
Bistro Verde		2013	
Bazille			
Broadway Bar	Bar		Located within New York City flagship store
Burger Bar	American	2022	Located within New York City flagship store
Cafe Bistro			
Cafe Nordstrom			
Classic Cafe		1980	Rebranded as Marketplace Cafe in 1998
Ebar	Coffeehouse		
Gelato Bar		2016	Located in Ala Moana Center store
Habitant	Bar	2013	
Hani Pacific	Hawaiian	2019	Previously located within New York City flagship store
Jeannie's	Pizza	2019	
Marketplace Cafe	Comfort food	1998	Rebranded from Classic Cafe
Milk Bar	Bakery	2019	Located in New York City men's store
Nordstrom Grill	American		
NYC Clubhouse	Bar		Located in New York City men's store
Oh Mochi	Mochi donuts		
Ruscello	Mediterranean	2016	Located in Hawaii Ala Moana Center store
Shoe Bar	Bar		
Sweet Sundae Bar	Dessert		
Wolf	Italian	2019	Located within New York City flagship store

==== Private brands ====
Nordstrom produces over 20 private label brands.

- 1901
- BP. (juniors)
- Caslon
- Chelsea28
- Halogen
- John W. Nordstrom
- Leith
- Nordstrom
- Rachel Parcell
- The Rail
- Stem (baby and toddler)
- Treasure & Bond
- Tucker + Tate
- Zella

=== Nordstrom Rack ===
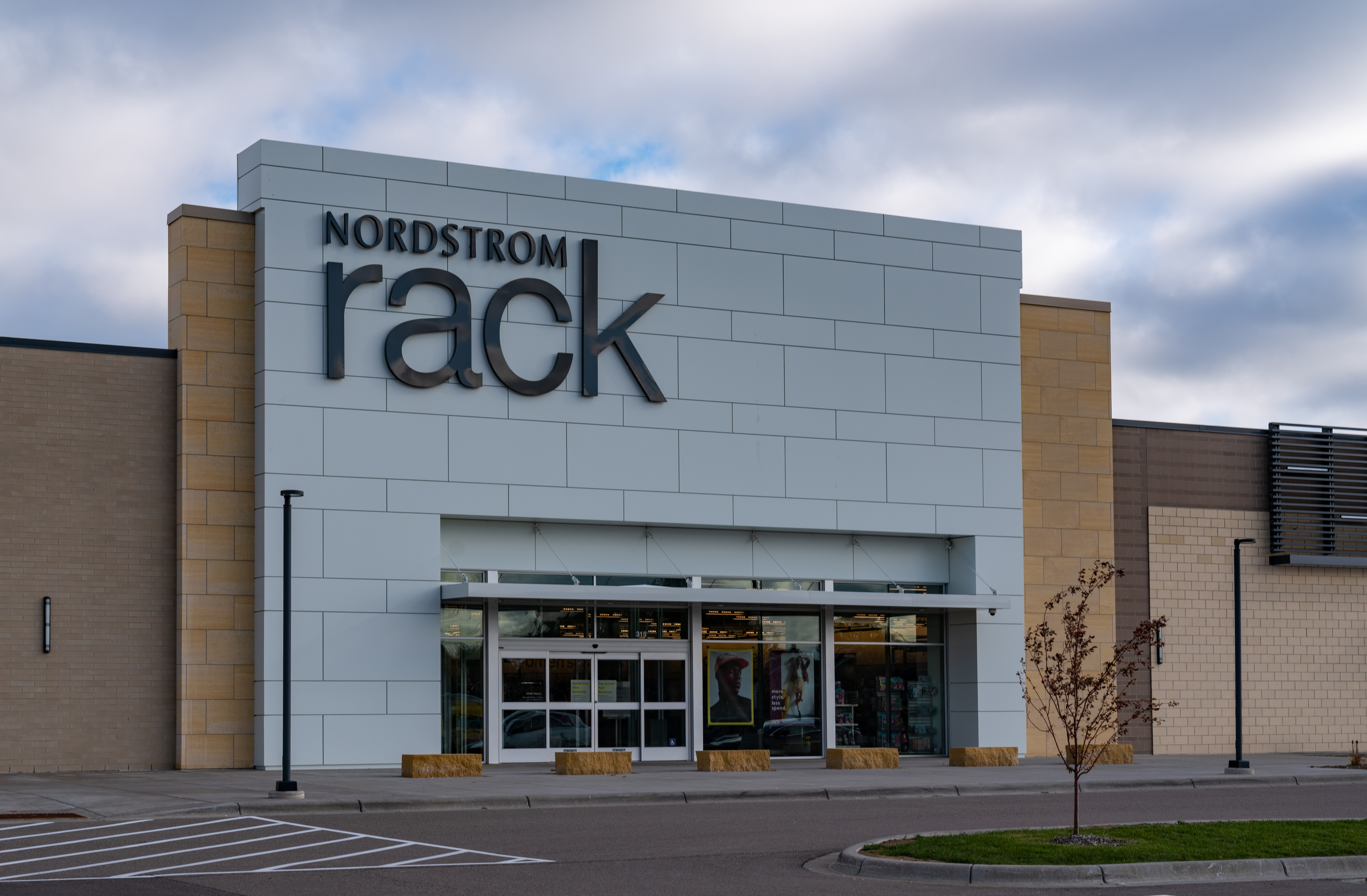
Exterior of a typical Nordstrom Rack store in St. Louis Park, Minnesota (2018)

Nordstrom Rack originated as a bargain basement in the downtown Seattle flagship store in 1973. It has since expanded into an off-price department store chain in its own right. As of May 2022, there are 249 Nordstrom Rack locations. Nordstrom Rack makes up about a fifth of Nordstrom's overall sales. Since 2013 Nordstrom Rack has generated over 2.5 billion dollars in sales.

Its website was launched in February 2014 by HauteLook, which was acquired by Nordstrom in 2011. The Nordstrom Rack e-commerce site was built on a shared platform with HauteLook, which is Nordstrom's flash sale business. On March 22, 2018, Nordstrom Rack opened its first store in Canada, which began its global expansion. All seven Nordstrom Rack stores in Canada closed on May 14, 2023, following Nordstrom's exit from the country. On December 20, 2021, it was reported that Nordstrom was considering spinning-off Nordstrom Rack into a separate company.

=== Last Chance ===
Last Chance clearance stores sell merchandise that cannot be resold at Nordstrom or Nordstrom Rack, including Nordstrom Rack returns that exceed the 45-day return policy. As of May 2022, there are two Last Chance locations in the Chicago and Phoenix suburbs.

== Flagship stores ==
As of June 2023, Nordstrom operates four flagship stores in three states. They are noted for being considerably smaller than competitors' flagship stores.

List of Nordstrom flagship stores
State or province	City	Shopping center or district	Size	Year opened	Year closed	Notes
British Columbia	Vancouver	Pacific Centre	230,000 sq ft (21,000 m^{2})	2015	2023	Best-performing store in the entire company before exiting Canada
California	San Francisco	Westfield San Francisco Centre	350,000 sq ft (33,000 m^{2})	1991	2023	Closed in August 2023
Illinois	Chicago	The Shops at North Bridge	272,000 sq ft (25,300 m^{2})	2000	—N/a	
New York	New York City	Central Park Tower	320,000 sq ft (30,000 m^{2})	2019	—N/a	Women's store
New York	New York City	Central Park Tower	47,000 sq ft (4,400 m^{2})	2018	—N/a	Men's store
Ontario	Ottawa	CF Rideau Centre	157,000 sq ft (14,600 m^{2})	2015	2023	Located within former Sears Canada flagship stores
Ontario	Toronto	Toronto Eaton Centre	213,000 sq ft (19,800 m^{2})	2016	2023	Located within former Sears Canada flagship stores
Puerto Rico	San Juan	The Mall of San Juan	138,000 sq ft (12,800 m^{2})	2015	2020	Temporarily closed in May 2020 due to the COVID-19 pandemic, and never reopened
Washington	Seattle	Frederick & Nelson Building	383,000 sq ft (35,600 m^{2})	1998	—N/a	Located within former Frederick & Nelson flagship store
Washington	Seattle	Ranke Building #2	97,720 sq ft (9,078 m^{2})	1973	1998	Original flagship store and headquarters

== Brand identity ==
=== Logo ===
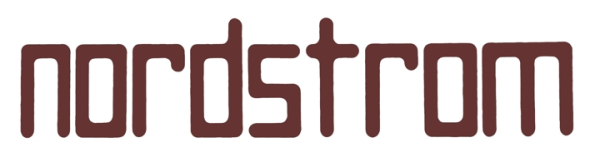
Logo used from 1973 to 1991

Logo used from 1991 to 2019

Logo used since 2019

== Rankings ==
In 2009, Nordstrom was listed at No. 72 in Fortune magazine's 100 Best Companies to Work For 2009. Nordstrom is a Hall of Fame member of Fortune magazine's "100 Best Companies to Work For". Nordstrom was No. 36 on the same list in 2008, No. 24 in 2007, No. 46 in 2006 and No. 88 in 2005. For the 20th year in a row, they made the list coming in at No. 94 in 2017.

In 2010, it ranked number 53, and dropped to 61 in 2012.

In 2018, the company was ranked 183rd on the Fortune 500 list of the largest United States corporations by revenue.

In December 2013, the fashion trade magazine, Women's Wear Daily reported Nordstrom as the top fashion retailer.

2019 was the 25th year that Nordstrom was listed on the Fortune 500.
