= Alvik, Luleå Municipality =

Alvik
- Location within Norrbotten Location within Sweden
- Coordinates: 65°34′N 21°47′E
- Country: Sweden
- Province: Norrbotten
- County: Norrbotten County
- Municipality: Luleå Municipality

Area
  - Total: 1.67 km^{2} (0.64 sq mi)

Population (31 December 2010)
  - Total: 777
  - Density: 466/km^{2} (1,210/sq mi)
- Time zone: UTC+1 (CET)
  - Summer (DST): UTC+2 (CEST)

Alvik is a locality situated in Luleå Municipality, Norrbotten County, Sweden, with 777 inhabitants in 2010.

== Sports ==
The following sports clubs are located in Alvik:

- Alviks IK
