= Duncan McLean =

Duncan McLean may refer to:

- Duncan McLean (footballer, born 1868) (1868–1941), Scottish international footballer with Everton and Liverpool
- Duncan McLean (footballer, born 1874) (1874–after 1952), Scottish footballer with Partick Thistle and Southampton
- Duncan McLean (writer) (born 1964), Scottish novelist, playwright, and short story writer
- Duncan McLean (rugby union)
- Duncan McLean, Australian founder of Way Funky Company Pte Ltd, a swimwear apparel manufacturing company
