= Wilson McCoy =

American illustrator and painter (1902–1961)

- Born: Robert Wilson McCoy; April 6, 1902 Troy, Missouri, U.S.
- Died: July 20, 1961 (aged 59) Barrington, Illinois, U.S.
- Areas: cartoonist, illustrator, painter
- Notable works: The Phantom
- Spouse: Dorothy Rainwater (m. 1925)

Robert Wilson McCoy (April 6, 1902 – July 20, 1961) was an American illustrator and painter, best known as the second artist on The Phantom comic strip. He always went by his middle name and signed The Phantom as Wilson McCoy, but his other artwork was signed R. Wilson McCoy.

== Biography ==
=== Early life and education ===
Wilson McCoy was born April 6, 1902, in Troy, Missouri, the sixth of seven children born to Edward Ferdinand (a salesman by profession) and Theodosia Turnbull McCoy. Before the age of seven, he was determined to become an artist. His father died when he was eleven years old, leaving his mother with seven children and no money. She opened a boarding house with borrowed funds, and young Wilson got a job in a drugstore, working eight hours a day after school and twelve hours on Saturdays and Sundays for $3 a week, which went into the family treasury. After two years of high school, he went to work as an errand boy for a St Louis advertising agency, D'Arcy Advertising Co., and practiced drawing during errands. Ultimately, he was taken on the firm's art staff, and after four years, he had saved enough money to attend Washington University's art school before branching out professionally.

McCoy studied at the School of the Art Institute of Chicago, the American Academy, and Washington University's School of Fine Arts (now the Sam Fox School of Design & Visual Arts), where he later served on the faculty.

He was a member of the National Cartoonist Society Foundation (NCSF).

=== Marriage and family ===
McCoy met Dorothy Rainwater at Washington University and married her in September 1925. His son Robert ("Bob") McCoy was born in 1927 and his daughter Carol was born on the 17th of November 1933. In 1930, the McCoy family lived at 7603 Forsyth, Clayton, Missouri, before moving to 100 N. Bemiston Avenue. When daughter Carol was born, they lived at 6748 Crest Avenue, University City. By 1940, they had moved to 7035 Ethel Avenue, St. Louis.

In 1931, McCoy miraculously escaped death in an auto accident where a reckless driver hit his car, causing it to rest on McCoy’s chest, crushing both his lungs. He made history as the first man to survive such an injury.

One year when Robert was a teenager, a birthday gift for him was that he was the "handsome prince" in one Phantom continuity. Wilson made a very accurate drawing of Robert for the story. That strip hung in the McCoy family home for many years.

The couple had moved to Barrington, Illinois 13 years prior to Wilson's death and lived on E. County Line Road. Later, McCoy's Barrington home, located on Donlea Road in Barrington, was used as a model for the Phantom's girlfriend Diana Palmer's house in the comic strip. McCoy used the study to draw the Phantom strips. The house was on a five-acre lot, and Wilson had a full-size farm tractor to mow it.

Wilson was also a volunteer fire marshal in Barrington. His fire chief helmet from the city is still with the family today as a souvenir.

During the year 1960, Wilson McCoy and his wife frequently visited Mrs. McCoy's sister, Mrs. Terrell Croft, an artist who lived on the Austin Highway, as well as the other sister, also an artist, Mrs. Robert Falmar.

=== Commercial artist ===
His first commercial art job of creating posters for the Radio Deith Orpheum Company lasted three years, after which he spent five years designing billboards for the General Outdoor Advertising Company. He made paintings for Liberty magazine covers, calendars, prints, pin-ups, and advertisements for major companies such as Shell Oil, Tums, Dr Pepper, and U.S. Rubber.

St. Louis city directories from the 1930s show that McCoy was associated with several studios:

- 1930: McCoy & Quest (2313 Washington Avenue) — with Charles Francis Quest
- 1933: Windsor Studio (2670 Washington Blvd) — with William E. Heede, Martin C. Kaiser, Robert McRoy, Everett Hayden Parks, Elise B. Parks, Lester Harry "Tex" Willman, and Co Windsor
- 1936: Associated Artists of St Louis (2670 Washington Blvd) — with William H. Cramer, Ralph Wesley Guze, William E. Heede, Martin C. Kaiser, Marjorie M. Lippman, Everett Hayden Parks, Elise B. Parks, Lester Harry "Tex" Willman, John Hamilton Stevens. and Fred Adolph Toerper
- 1937: Advertiser’s Artists Co. (2670 Washington Blvd) — with Kenneth Cowhey, Ralph Wesley Guze, Martin C. Kaiser, Lester Harry "Tex" Willman, John Hamilton Stevens, and Benjamin Stalker Read

=== The Phantom ===
Wilson McCoy had initially shared an art studio with Ray Moore, the original Phantom artist. When Moore went to serve in the military during the Second World War, McCoy took over the responsibilities of illustrating The Phantom. McCoy started signing the strips and was fully credited as the artist from the daily story "Queen Astra Of Trondelay" (1946), although he started drawing the strip from 1941, when he first filled in for Moore.

Differing sources conflict in their accounts of the transition from Moore to McCoy. In one account, after his return from the war, Moore focused on the Sunday page only but was forced to retire in 1947. In a 1978 interview with Phantom writer Falk, he described the change this way: McCoy was Moore's assistant and good friend. When Moore was called into the military in 1941, McCoy took over and he also continued when Moore came back. From then on Moore drew on extremely rare occasions, but he was still on the pay list, and at first his signature was also on some of the series he did not draw. In yet another interview, Falk stated, "Ray only drew it for three or four years, then he went off to war as a pilot. Then Wilson McCoy, who was a friend of his, an art director of some company, took over in his absence. But he kept Ray's name on it right through the war.

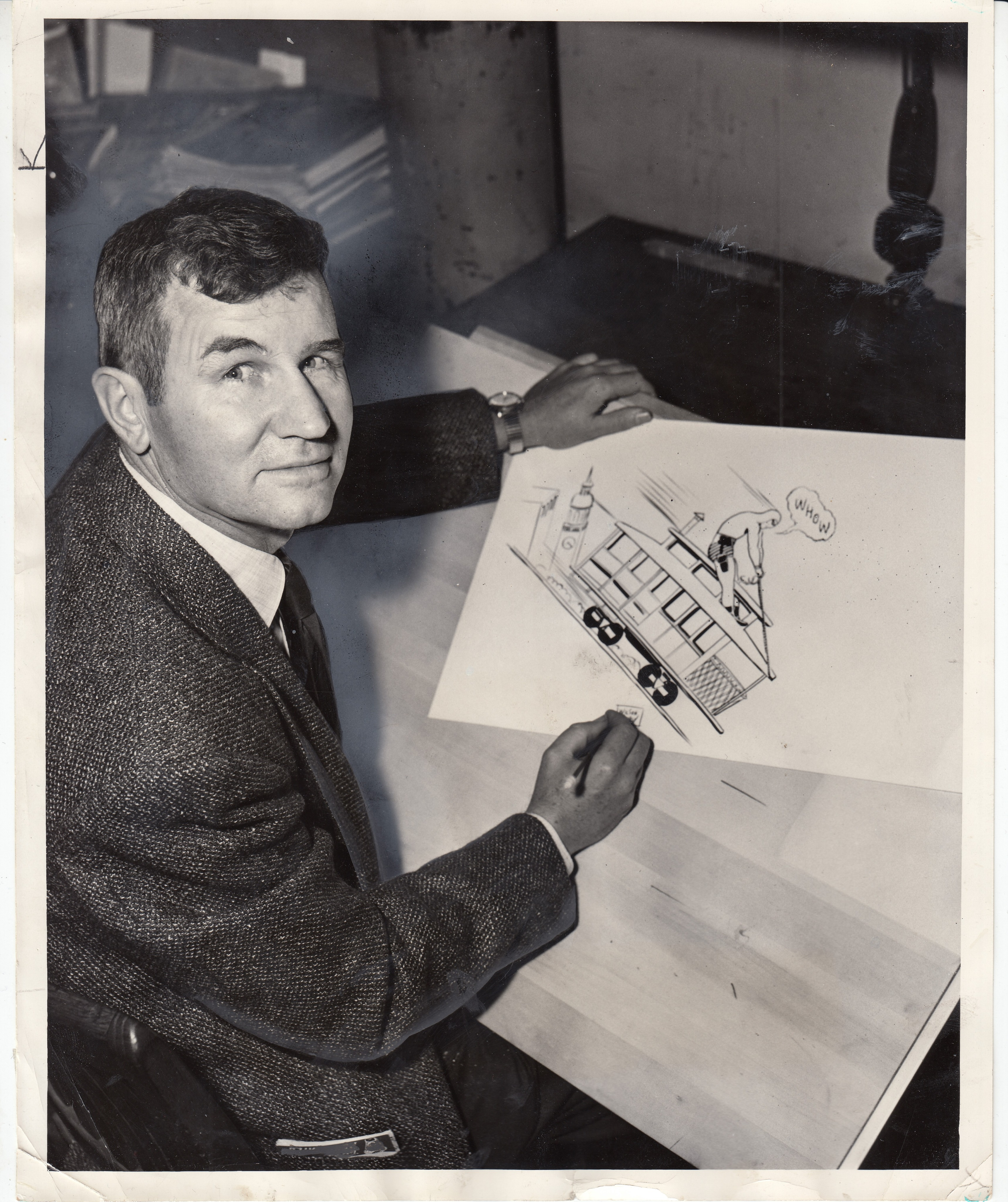
Wilson McCoy at the drawing desk - 1954

McCoy's wife, Dorothy, was also an artist, and she penciled in the lettering and panel borders on her husband's strips.

In an interview with Ed Rhoades, Bob McCoy confided: "Initially, Wilson McCoy was paid $75 a week to sub for Moore, an arrangement that ticked him off" when he discovered how much more Moore was getting paid. But conditions improved, and the family moved to a prosperous Chicago suburb. Wilson McCoy built a studio. Robert regained a bedroom."

In describing his workload and schedule, McCoy explained in an interview, "King Features Syndicate, which distributes The Phantom, prefers the artists keep six weeks ahead of their weekly strips and three months ahead for Sunday material." He added: "But few artists ever reach this goal, especially if they are not also the author. Lee Falk writes the story of The Phantom as well as the story for Mandrake the Magician; girls at King Features Syndicate do the coloring for the Sunday comics."

As for help in drawing the strip, Today’s Cartoon (publication) said, Don Moore, a cartoonist and a survivor of WWII after being wounded, treated and discharged from hospital, worked as an assistant to Wilson McCoy who was drawing The Phantom. “I did the background and lettering,” Moore said. The exact date of his time on the Phantom is not known.

The Phantom had its fair share of criticism. The strip was branded as "very objectionable ... in terms of cultural, moral and emotional tone and impact" by "50 trained reviewers" rating comic strips in Parents magazine in 1949. Also in July 1949, censorship laws struck the publication of The Phantom in France. (It should also be noted that in March 1960 The Phantom was being published in 467 newspapers, with half of them being outside the U.S.)

McCoy ceased drawing the strip after he became ill in 1961. His last daily strip was dated 19 August 1961, and his last Sunday strip was dated 17 September 1961; the following Sunday strip, dated 24 September 1961, was drawn by Carmine Infantino. The strip was continued by Bill Lignante for a short while, and then by Sy Barry.

Heritage Auctions is the main auctioneer for U.S. sale of Wilson McCoy original Phantom artwork. In 2013, a 1955 original Phantom Sunday art page was auctioned by the French auction house Artcurial; and in 2016, a Wilson McCoy 1958 Phantom Sunday art page was auctioned by Sotheby's.

=== World traveler ===
Like Phantom creator Lee Falk, McCoy was a world traveler with an adventurous spirit, traveling to jungles where he visited native tribes.

He made several trips to exotic locations to make the stories look realistic. In Cairo, he was detained for unauthorized photography, and in Morocco he was robbed. On safari in Central Africa, he traveled in an unreliable vehicle, was chased by an aggressive rhino, and confronted belligerent elephants. In Central Africa he studied forest Pygmy peoples. Despite being threatened by their poisoned arrows, McCoy won over the tribe members. He sketched them as they posed and in return was welcomed and invited to beat on tom drums. This was his tour to the Republic of the Congo (Léopoldville) in 1961 for researching the Mbuti pygmies of the Ituri Rainforest tribe for episodes of The Phantom. The Mbuti became the inspiration for the Bandar tribe featured in the Phantom stories.

McCoy participated in four trips abroad sponsored by the National Cartoonists Society for the entertainment of military personnel. The trips were made to Europe in 1953, 1954 and 1955, plus one to Japan in 1955. In 1954, a Christmas card to his family lists the countries he visited in the spring: Germany, Italy, Greece, Turkey, Libya, French Morocco, and France, with the following caption: "I cant wait to show these to Dorothy, Carol and to Alice and Bob, Spring 1954, While drawing funny pictures to entertain overseas military personnel — The Phantom has fun. Taking pictures to entertain his good friends at home."

In a 1960 interview, McCoy explained, "I've been almost every place American soldiers have. I contribute my time and the military forces provide transportation." His travels have helped in his artwork, he said, making it easier for him to draw scenes and people in far-off lands. He claimed to be a "camera bug" and used his photographs as models for some of his work, often including in his strip people of whom he had taken pictures. Wherever he went, he studied the architecture and people's dress for possible future use.

=== Death ===
In 1961 upon returning from the trip to the Republic of the Congo (Léopoldville), McCoy stopped drawing, became ill, and was hospitalized. R. Wilson McCoy died July 19, 1961, at age 59, on a Wednesday afternoon in Wesley Memorial Hospital, Chicago, following a heart attack the previous Thursday morning.

A memorial service was held on the Saturday after his demise at the Barrington Methodist Church. As requested by the family, flower contributions were made to the Heart Fund or the Barrington Methodist Church. Rev. Carl G. Mettling, along with Rev. Eugene B. Nyman, were in charge of the service in the church, which was filled to near capacity. Messages and words of condolences were received by the family from all parts of the United States and many other countries. McCoy belonged to the Barrington Natural History Society, and two days before he was stricken, had shown at the society's meeting, a film with commentary on his journey into the Congo that spring of 1961. It was his first program on the trip into the African jungle, which was made in the interest of his art.

According to later Phantom artist Sy Barry, "First of all when Wilson McCoy became ill and went into the hospital, he was too ill. He had some kind of infection that reoccurs, that he developed when he was in Africa and it seemed to return. Somehow it formed a blood clot and went to his heart and he died in the hospital." In another interview published by Hermes Press in 2019, Barry recalls "... he seemed to have an infection, a lingering dormant infection that he picked up in Africa and they had gone and treated him with antibiotics but every once in a while it would crop up a bit and affect his heart a bit little too. This time he had a heart seizure in the hospital after having been battling the disease."

He was survived by his wife Dorothy and two children, Robert Wilson Jr. (Bob) and Carol. Son Robert Wilson McCoy Jr was the proprietor of the Museum of Questionable Devices in Minneapolis and a frequent guest at talk shows such as Late Night with David Letterman. He died in 2010 at the age of 83.

== Art style ==
Certain art critics have termed Wilson McCoy's artistic style as naive art. In his work on The Phantom he "started out copying Moore exactly", but after a while, he found his own distinctive style.

McCoy always drew with attention to detail, and he used photographic references for every drawing, having his family and friends pose for him and act out the different situations happening in the stories he worked on. McCoy also made for himself an elaborate wooden mannequin to use for his figure drawings in unique poses.

According to the late comics historian and collector Ethan Roberts:

"McCoy was an adherent of a different school, the school of the poster artist.... Line work is typically thicker, more definitive, bolder than found in the illustrator's school. The overall composition is simplified to have an immediate eye-catching impact on the viewer.... Depth of field is significantly reduced or lost altogether, but understanding exactly what's going on is enhanced. It's easier and faster to comprehend the action from a greater distance. Less attention and concentration is required, allowing the reader to move through the story more quickly, an advantage for the busy newspaper reader."

The Sunday page artworks are characterized by the ligne claire style of drawing similar to that of Hergé's Tintin. The original inked line art has well-defined contours and carries very little or no hatchings and shading (Zip-A-Tone mechanical textures were also not used on Sunday art), thus allowing the colorist full flexibility to use bright, bold colors.

Lee Falk said in an interview: "Many of the comic book aficionados I meet in Europe like McCoy's work. They grew up with it and it's what they are used to."

Falk was already known for the use of surrealism in Mandrake stories. McCoy incorporated certain metaphysical and surrealistic artistic elements to illustrate Phantom stories. He masterfully set the atmosphere, using "film noir" lighting, whenever required by the storyline.

Aspects of American Realism may also be perceived in McCoy's work due to the use of photographic references in his panels. In a Phantom exhibition held in Sweden, a parallel was drawn between Wilson McCoy and American artist Edward Hopper. Hopper had also worked as a commercial advertising illustrator (ref. artwork for American Locomotive Company. 1944). Both worked in the realm of narrative art and were masters of dramatic lighting (and diagonal shadows).

== Communications with fans ==
·McCoy actively interacted with his fans through letters. He set up a Phantom club in the '50s and sent out a sealed certificate of membership to fans with the following mention : "Know All Men By These Presents: That in consideration of your valued friendship this certificate of membership in the Ancient and Mysterious Order of The Phantom is hereby awarded to ______, this day of ____ with all rights and privileges, to Health, Wealth and Wisdom," signed by himself as the "Exalted Imperial Phantom Delieanator" & Dorothy — the "Witnessing and Recording Fatima." One such certificate of induction was later given to Anthony Tollin, the American comics colorist, by Bob McCoy, who filled in his name and the date of 20 Feb 1952.

·In a letter to a fan written in 1949, McCoy explained that:

"I have never had the syndicate return any of my originals to me, however, will make a sketch for your collection and mail with this letter..."

·In another letter to Joyce and Ken Browne, signed “Dot, Carol, Bob, Wilson, and Brownie,” February 21, 1950. McCoy wrote:

"About a year and a half ago, my wife, daughter, and I had dinner in Bangor on our way thru to Harborside where we spent about a week, and where I did some landscape painting. Main[e] is certainly a beautiful state. By the way, I should appreciate it if you would tear out the full sheet of the paper in which the Phantom appears and mail it to me, so that I may see the size and position. Best wishes also from the McCoy family."

In the upper portion of the page McCoy added a brilliant ink sketch of the Phantom in front of his secret abode, the Skull Cave, with McCoy adding his artist signature below, "Wilson McCoy, 2/21/50," and writing an inscription in a speech balloon above: "Best wishes to Joyce and Ken Browne, from the Phantom family — Diana–Mama–Uncle Dave–Devil–Hero–Guran — and the Phantom."

·In a letter written on Sept 17, 1952, to Harrell Jacob Leigeber (Alabama, USA) McCoy wrote:

"Was glad to learn that I had a friend and a Phantom reader in Birmingham. Am sending a print from a painting which I made some time ago. I did this type of work before I started drawing the strip. Barrington, Ill., is a small town about 35 miles from Chicago. I live about 2-1/2 miles from Barrington in the country. I work at home in a studio which I built near my house. Have a married son and a daughter in college. I hope the material which I am sending will be what you want. I would appreciate it if you would tear the full page (showing the Phantom strip) from your paper and mail it to me. Thanks and best wishes, Wilson McCoy."

·A 1952 drawing depicts the Phantom playing the tom tom drum conveying the message : "Phantom to West Point, Phantom to West Point-Coedets arriving - pull your shades down - Roger". Created for the 150th anniversary of West Point Military Academy (NY), that year, the National Cartoonists Society invited top comic illustrators to create one-panel humorous comics on the subject of West Point becoming co-ed.

·In a letter to fellow cartoonist Clarence Allen on April 3, 1953, McCoy wrote:

Congratulations on doing a bang-up job with your new book. It is good that you have both the pro and con, contained in the same volume, since each is so convincing that if either were seen alone a reader would be inclined to believe it without dreaming that there could be another side of the story. Thanks for my copy. Sincerely, Wilson McCoy."

·In a letter to Fred Giffoniello (12-31-1953) McCoy wrote : "Am mailing you a Sunday page for your collection and exhibit. You will notice that there are seven panels in which there are illustrations. The syndicate makes three types of arrangements depending upon the size my strip will run in a particular paper. The arrangement on the original drawing is the one used for "half page" use. When the strip runs as a "third page" some of the illustration is cut off at the bottom, and for full page, the panels are arranged like this -> ThePhantom, #1 #2, #3 4, 5 6 7 (in 3 tiers) the syndicate does all of the coloring (they have a large art dept.) I hope the material i'm sending will be of some help - Sincerely yours Wilson McCoy. [this letter was auctioned by Heritage Auctions on 26 April 2023]

·In 1954, sophomore students from the history section of Federal Way High School took issue with a panel in a Phantom comic strip that contained a depiction of Alexander the Great with a white beard. McCoy wrote a letter of reply and said:

You have got me backed into a corner and by superior numbers have brought me to my knees. Whenever I get into an untenable situation I call upon one of my very good friends to extricate me. Have turned your letter over to this friend for the answer."

This friend was none other than the Phantom, who sent the following message via tom drums in a drawing: "Phantom to Federal Way, McCoy is correct Alex received a scare while still a baby turning his hair (and beard) white. Best regards to all, The Phantom."

·In a letter to a fan on 1 July 1959, McCoy gave a career advice : "Dear Eddie, This is the first chance i've had to answer your letter. Your opportunity with the local newspaper sounds fine. Don't worry about the price they pay. You ask in your letter if i think you might get your gag cartoons syndicated thru' K.7. I would not rush things. Get your experience first. At your age there is plenty of time ahead. Am sending a Phantom strip as promised. Sincerely, - Wilson McCoy"

·In a letter to a fan named Van (2 June 1961) McCoy wrote the following : "I returned from the Belgian Congo just a short time ago and found your letter and request for material which you had mailed May 1st. Sorry for the delay in answering. I paid a visit to the pygmies while in Africa and had several exciting experiences. Hope the material which i'm sending will serve your purpose. The Phantom now runs in 505 newspapers in 47 countries. It began in 1936 about half of the papers where the Phantom appears are in the U.S.The strip is specially popular in Scandinavian countries and in Central and South America. Please give my personal regards to the boys and girls serving overseas.Sincerely yours Wilson McCoy"

·In a note to Bill Lignante on an illustrated card (of the Phantom playing a drum), McCoy wrote:

"Hey Bill, I'm out in the jungle drummin' up business for good ol' Adelphi Inn — The Phantom." Aldephi Inn which was created by Lignante had some Wilson McCoy art on a wall.

Wilson McCoy's letters are considered collector's items and are sold at auctions.

== McCoy's Phantom in contemporary art ==
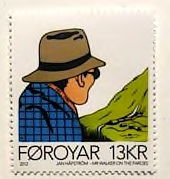
Mr. Walker Faroe Islands stamp by Jan Hafstrom.

Several artists have been inspired to create works based on panels from Wilson's Phantom comic strips:

Dick Frizzell (New Zealand):

- The Big Kiss, Another Big Kiss, Sleeping Woman, Who Will Save Her? (Phantom Triptych), oil on three canvas panels (2001)
- A Flying Oaf, gouache on paper (2002)

Peter Kingston (Australia): Running Mr. Walker

Jan Håfström (Sweden):

- Who is Mr. Walker?, public installation, Stockholm, Järnvägsparken (2014)
- Mr. Walker, acrylic on board (2004)
- Mr. Walker Running Black/Blue, The Outsider Mr. Walker, acrylic on panel (2007)
- Mr. Walker Alone (4 works):
  - Walker with Moon (2008)
  - Walker Och Devil (2005, 2008)
  - Angivaren II (The Informer II) (2004)
  - The Explanation (2001)
- Detektiven (2011)
- From Walker with Love (2003)

On 24 September 2012 a McCoy-inspired Mr. Walker postage stamp, illustrated by Jan Håfström, was released in the Faroe Islands. The idea came from Niels Halm, director of the Nordic House in Tórshavn.

Dare Jennings, founder of the brands Deus Ex Machina and Mambo Graphics, cited Wilson McCoy as his favorite artist in his opening speech at the Bunker Cartoon Gallery Phantom art show in New South Wales, Australia. Jennings produced Phantom T-shirts featuring McCoy's art via the Phantom textile printers, Australia) in the early 1980s.

== Reprints ==
McCoy's Phantom stories are occasionally published in the Australian Frew Publications Phantom comic, and the Swedish, Norwegian, and Finnish Phantom comic books, and also in hardcover editions.

In 1955, McCoy was one of 95 comic artists invited to attend the US President's breakfast hosted by the National Cartoonists Society in Washington, D.C. President Eisenhower attended the breakfast, which was organized as a fundraiser for the United States Savings Bonds program. Wilson McCoy's art was featured in President Eisenhower's Cartoon Book, published in 1956, which was a tribute to the President.

In 1975, the publishing company Biblioteca Unviversale Rizzoli of Milan released a Wilson McCoy special in the series I Giganti del Fumetto with a 5-page foreword titled, "Un fantasma che cammina da quarant anni" ("A Ghost who walks since 40 years") written by Ferruccio Alessandri.

In the year 2000, Egmont Publications from Sweden published an oversized volume called Wilson McCoy - de opublicerade äventyren, featuring stories not published in Sweden before. It includes articles about McCoy, written by Ulf Granberg, Ed Rhoades, and Pete Klaus, and also features an interview with McCoy's children Carol Dharamsey and Robert McCoy.

In 2005, the Italian publisher La Repubblica published a Wilson McCoy anthology called L'Uomo mascherato – Il mito dell'Ombra che cammina (Serie Oro 18) with an introductory essay by Luca Raffaelli.

Hermes Press published the Wilson McCoy daily strips in their The Phantom Complete Dailies volumes 5-17 (2013–2019). The Wilson McCoy Sunday stories were published by Hermes Press in The Complete Sundays Vol. 2–Vol. 7 (2014 - 2020).

Black and white press proofs of the continuities, that originate from King Features Syndicate, are archived at Michigan State University, in the Special collections division, which is supervised by Randy Scott, the MSU Special Collections Librarian, Comic Art Bibliographer, and head curator of the MSU Comic Art Collection. King Features syndicate donated another set of proofs to Ohio State University. Wilson McCoy original art may be viewed at the Billy Ireland Cartoon Library & Museum (Ohio State University libraries).

== Exhibitions ==
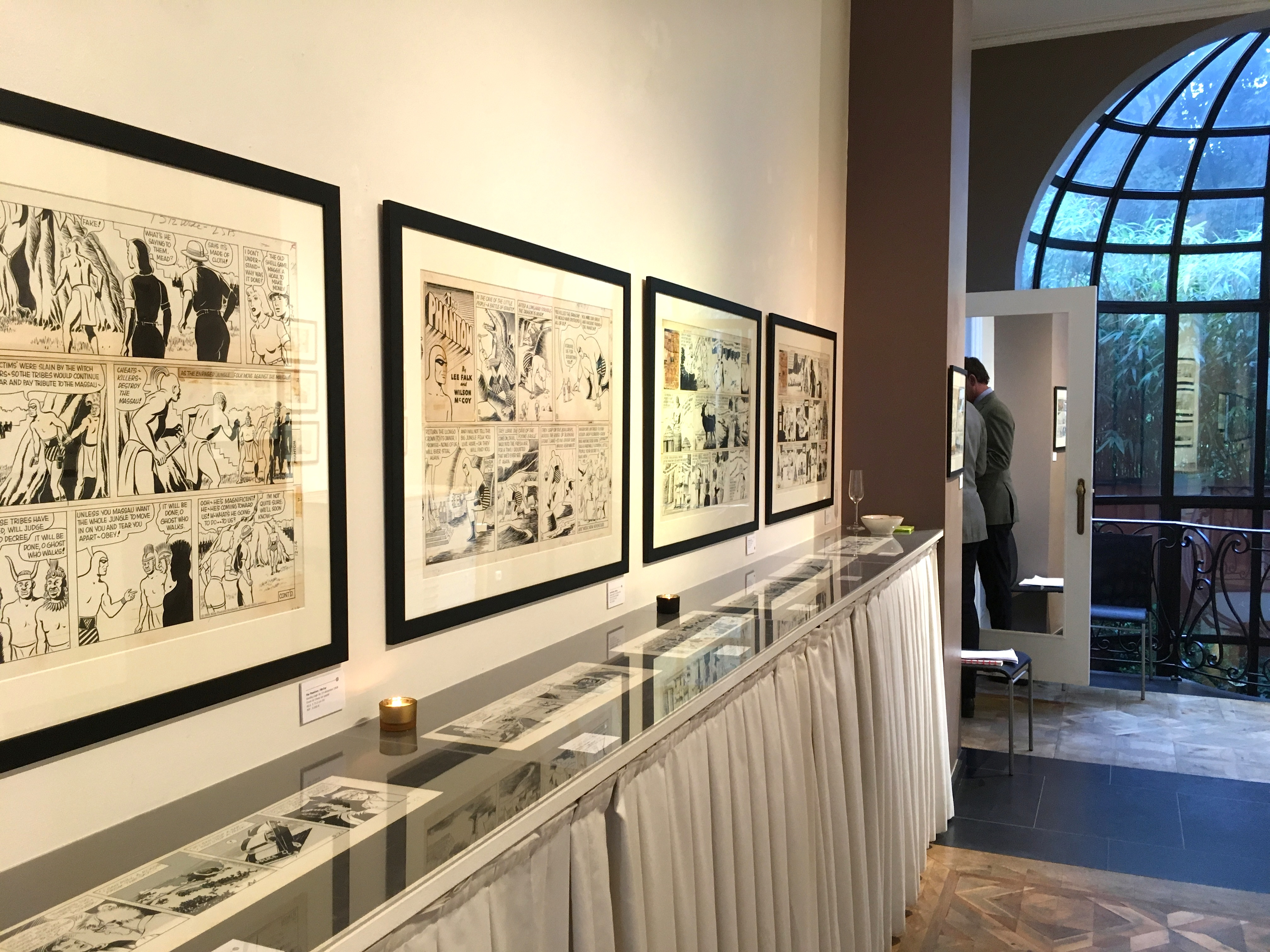
Wilson McCoy art exhibition at Gallery Champaka in Brussels

- "Wilson McCoys Fantomen" at the Borås Konstmuseum in Borås, Sweden (February 2017)
- "Wilson McCoy Godfather of Pop" Exhibition in Kiruna City Hall, Sweden (October – November 2017)
- Wilson McCoy original Phantom art strips were exhibited at the Lee Falk exhibition at Gallery Champaka, Brussels, Belgium (October 2019)

The two exhibitions in Sweden were curated by Martin Goldbeck-Lowe.
