= List of swimwear brands =

This is a list of notable swimwear brands and manufacturers.

Brand	Year of establishment	Country of origin
Alanic	2011	United States
2wink	2005	Australia
AgonSwim	2000	United States
Andrew Christian	2001	United States
Arena	1973 (1990)	Italy
ASICS	1949	Japan
aussieBum	2001	Australia
Baci Lingerie	2009	United States
Bare Necessities	1998	United States
Billabong	1973	Australia
Björn Borg	1997	Sweden
Bravissimo	1995	England
Catalina Swimwear	1907	United States
Chantelle (lingerie)	1876	France
Curvy Kate	2009	England
Deus Ex Machina	2006	Australia
Diapolo	1997	Hungary
Dolfin Swimwear	1941	United States
Funkita	2002	Australia
Funky Trunks	2002	Australia
Gottex	1956	Israel
Grand Sport Group	1961	Thailand
H&M	1947	Sweden
Head	1950	United States
Hunkemöller	1886	Netherlands
Hurley International	1981	United States
Island Company	2002	United States
Jantzen	1910	United States
Jolidon	1993	Romania
Kanvas by Katin	1959	United States
Keel	2014	Serbia
La Perla	1971	Italy
Mambo Graphics	1984	Australia
Melissa Odabash	1999	United States
Mizuno Corporation	1906	Japan
O'Neill	1952	United States
Ocean Pacific	1972	United States
Onia	2011	United States
Oxbow	1985	France
Patagonia	1973	United States
Quiksilver	1969	Australia
Rip Curl	1969	Australia
Ron Jon	1959	United States
Roxy	1990	United States
RVCA	2001	United States
Seafolly	1975	Australia
Speedo International Limited	1914	Australia
Splash About International	2001	United Kingdom
Tori Richard	1956	United States
Triumph International	1886	Germany
Tyr Sport, Inc.	1985	United States
Une Piece	2016	Australia
Venus Swimwear	1984	United States
Victoria's Secret	1977	United States
Vilebrequin	1971	France
Volcom	1991	United States
Watersun Swimwear	1955	Australia
Wicked Weasel	1994	Australia
XTG Extreme Game	1987	Spain
Yandy.com	2007	United States
Zoggs	1992	Australia
Zoke	1996	China
