= Peter Archer =

Peter Archer may refer to:

- Peter Archer, Baron Archer of Sandwell (1926–2012), British Labour peer and politician
- Peter Archer (actor) (1943–2000), Australian entrepreneur and martial arts champion
- Peter Archer (author), author of several Forgotten Realms novels
- Peter Archer, member of Australian rock band Crow
