= Achille Salvagni =

Italian designer and architect, specialising in luxury residences

- Born: 1970 (age 55–56)
- Education: Royal Institute of Technology in Stockholm
- Known for: Interior design, furniture and yacht interiors

Achille Salvagni (born 1970) is an Italian artist, designer, and architect. He is the principal behind Achille Salvagni Atelier, the collectible design gallery and the award-winning multidisciplinary architecture and design firm. His designs infuse elements of both classicism and modernism.

In 2002, Salvagni established his architectural firm on the Palatine Hill next to the Roman Colosseum. He then expanded into London in 2021 with a gallery in Mayfair and opened a location on Madison Avenue in New York City in 2022, followed by a location on Worth Avenue in Palm Beach in 2026.

== Early life ==
Born in Rome in 1970, Salvagni grew up in Latina and attended the Sapienza University of Rome for six years, where he received his Architecture Degree with honors in 1998. He then spent a year studying in Sweden at the Royal Institute of Technology in Stockholm where he became inspired by Scandinavian modernism that is part of his repertoire today.

From a young age, Salvagni was interested in design, absorbing the Roman architecture he was surrounded by. His father worked in construction and he would accompany him on site visits as a child, which also fueled his interest in the field and the different materials and crafts involved in it.

== Career ==
In 2002, Salvagni founded Achille Salvagni Architetti in Rome, focused on interiors for high-end properties and yachts. Since 2013, he has expanded into the production of his limited-edition collectible designs. Salvagni independently represents his collectible pieces, after 10 years with Maison Gerard.

Achille opened his gallery on Grafton Street in London in 2015 and on Madison Avenue in New York City in 2023, and on Worth Avenue in Palm Beach in 2026 each displaying his collectible designs.

Following the success of Atelier, he opened his first flagship gallery in Mayfair London in 2015, and another in New York City in 2023 to showcase his latest creations.

He debuted at Design Miami in 2025, participated at The Winter Show in 2023, presented at PAD Paris and London since 2009, and has exhibited at Salon Art + Design in New York in 2022 and 2023. Salvagni was honored as a Galerie Magazine Creative Mind in 2020, and was listed on the Elle Decor A-List of Designers in 2015. In 2019, Rizzoli published a book about Salvagni featuring his work and dedication to craftsmanship. He has collaborated with brands such as Azimut|Benetti, JL Coquet, and Waterworks. In 2026, he published a book with ASSOULINE entitled “ACHILLE”, written by curator Glenn Adamson that highlights his collectible design, lighting, and objets d’art and presents a comprehensive portrait of a designer whose work bridges ancient craftsmanship and modern imagination with unique precision.

== Style & Influences ==
Although Salvagni identifies as a modernist, his work reflects historical influences through material choice, traditional craftsmanship, and narrative depth. His designs utilize materials such as bronze, precious stones, onyx and mahogany, which are produced by skilled artisans. By contrasting these materials, he creates visual narratives influenced by Roman heritage, Scandinavian design, classical mythology and history.

Salvagni’s designs involve specialized techniques, and he has collaborated with highly-skilled craftsmen across Rome to create his pieces for years– from a bronze caster who works with the Vatican to stoneworkers who repair the marble and mosaics in Rome’s churches to woodworkers who restore antique cabinets for aristocratic palaces.

== Personal life ==
Salvagni lives between Rome and London and is a collector of Post-War Italian art.

== Awards ==
2007

- M/Y Mikymar (36 meters): Winner of “Best Interior Design” by World Yachts Trophies 2007.

2012

- M/Y Numptia (70 meters):
  - Special Jury Prize for "Interior Design with the Widest Appeal” at the World Superyacht Awards 2012.
  - Winner of “Bespoke Furniture Award” at the ShowBoats Design Awards 2012.

2015

- Listed among the 100 best interior designers in the world by AD France.
- From 2015-2018, included in Elle Decor USA's A-List for four consecutive years.

2018

- M/Y Mr. Oh (35 meters): Winner of “Semi-Displacement or Planing Two Deck Motor Yachts 35m and Above” at the World Superyacht Awards 2018.
- Rossinavi Endeavour II (49,9 meters): Winner of “Best Power 40m - 65m” at the International Superyacht Society Awards 2018.

2021

- M/Y Club M (40 meters):
  - Winner of “Best Motor Yacht 40-50m” at the World Superyacht Awards 2021.
  - Winner of “Best Interior Design, Motor Yacht 499GT and below” at the Boat International Design & Innovation Awards 2021.

2022

- Azimut Grande 36M: Winner of “Best Interior Design, yachts from 30 to 50 meters” by the World Yachts Trophies 2022.

2026

- “Parati” - Displacement Motor Yachts - 499GT and below, 45m to 49.9m at World Superyacht Awards 2026
- “RJ” - Best Interior Design - Motor Yachts, 1000GT and below, 40m and above at BOAT Design & Innovation Awards 2026
