= Trade secret (disambiguation) =

A trade secret is a formula, practice, process, design, instrument, pattern, or compilation of information that is not generally known or reasonably ascertainable, by which a business can obtain an economic advantage over competitors or customers.

Trade secret may also refer to:

- Trade Secret (Australian company), a defunct Australian discount department store
- "Trade Secrets", an episode of BattleTech
