= XTG =

XTG or xtg may refer to:

- XTG Extreme Game, Spanish men's and women's swimwear and underwear manufacturer
- XTG, the IATA airport code for Thargomindah Airport, Queensland, Australia
- xtg, the former ISO 639-3 language code for Transalpine Gaulish language, Gaul
