= Domain Central =

- Location: Townsville, Queensland Australia
- Coordinates: 19°16′34.03″S 146°45′27.68″E
- Opened: 2007
- Developer: Lancini Property and Development
- Num. of stores: 60
- Num. of anchor tenants: 11
- Floors: 1
- Parking: 1,400
- Website: www.domaintownsville.com.au

Domain Central is an outlet shopping centre in Townsville. It is Queensland's largest major outlet, containing 60 stores including major retailers such as Harvey Norman, JB Hi-Fi, Freedom Furniture, Lincraft, and TK Maxx (formerly Trade Secret) and a number of other homemaker, fashion and discount outlets. The shopping centre was developed in 2006 and 2007 by Lancini Developments.

== Stores ==
Domain Central remains primarily a homemaker mall, with the great majority of the centre's 60+ retailers specialising in furniture, interior design, or consumer electronics. There are also a number of fashion retailers in the centre, as well as some smaller specialist businesses.
