= 1 vs. 100 (Australian game show) =

Australian game show

- The Australian logo to be used in 2008; a very similar one was used in 2007.
- Genre: Game show
- Created by: Endemol Southern Star
- Presented by: Eddie McGuire
- Country of origin: Australia
- Original language: English
- No. of seasons: 2
- No. of episodes: 36

Production
- Production location: Docklands Studios Melbourne
- Running time: 47 minutes
- Production company: Endemol Southern Star

Original release
- Network: Nine Network
- Release: 29 January 2007 – 13 June 2008

1 vs. 100 was an Australian game show based on the American version of the same name and the original Dutch version created by Endemol. The game pits one person against 100 others for a chance to win one million dollars (Australian currency). The program was hosted by former Nine Network CEO and personality Eddie McGuire.

The Australian version of the show premiered on 29 January 2007 at 8:30 pm on the Nine Network and was recorded in Docklands Studios Melbourne.

The format of the Australian show is based on series 2 of the US show (those US shows that aired after 1 December 2006). The prize ladder is half the value of the US ladder (in Australian dollars), with a single million-dollar jackpot for eliminating all 100 players.

A second season of the show had started airing on Friday, 6 June 2008 to 13 June 2008 (except for NSW and QLD), but it was put on hiatus and then cancelled (and its website removed).

== Format ==
The Australian version of 1 vs. 100 is very closely related to the American version of the same name, with the only change being the prize structure. One contestant competes against a "mob" of 100 people for a top prize of $1 million.

Question	Value
1, 2 & 3	$500
4 & 5	$1,000
6	$1,500
7	$2,000
8	$2,500
9	$3,000
10	$3,500
11	$4,000
12	$4,500
13+	$5,000

Contestants are given a question with three possible answers. The mob had to answer the question within six seconds, and then the contestant had to answer it. When the contestant is happy to answer the question, he/she then pushes the button that corresponds with the answer. If he/she answers the question correctly, any player in the 100-person mob who answered the question incorrectly is eliminated from play. Players add a specific amount to their bank for every member of the mob they eliminated on a particular question (see table, left). If after any correct answer the entire 100-person mob is eliminated, the contestant wins the grand prize of $1,000,000.

After 90 members had been eliminated, the contestant could look at the question—but not the answers—for three seconds before he/she decides to choose either the money or the mob. The mob also gets to see the question as well. This rule was added to the US version on 9 March 2007.

Contestants have three forms of assistance, or "helps" available to use at any point during the game:

- Poll the Mob: Contestants pick one of the three answers (two if Ask the Mob was used in the same question). The number of mob players who chose that answer is revealed. This choice could be wasted if no one picked that answer as they could have picked the other answer(s).
- Ask the Mob: One mob member who answered correctly and one who answered incorrectly are chosen at random. Each explains his/her decision to the contestant. Mob members must tell the truth as to which answer they chose, but do not have to tell the truth as to why they chose that answer. This automatically eliminates one wrong answer, thus leaving contestants with a 50-50 chance of picking the right answer. If all the mob members select the same answer, one member is polled, and the contestant is told of the possibilities: either he chooses the same answer (in which case he either goes on with every member of the mob, or everybody goes home with nothing); or he chooses a different answer (in which case either the mob splits the prize pool if they are correct, or the contestant goes home with one million dollars.) Conversely, if all the mob members choose from the two incorrect answers, only one mob member is interviewed. The contestant is then informed that that answer is incorrect, and that every mob member got it wrong; the contestant then gets to choose from the correct answer, and the other, incorrect, answer.
- Trust the Mob: Contestants commit to choosing the answer chosen by the largest number of mob members. If there is a two or three-way tie (e.g.: 50 mob members left, 20 choosing A, 20 choosing B, and 10 choosing C), the contestant would only know how many members of the mob chose A, B and C and does not have to choose from one of the high-polling options. This could also mean that this help is useless if exactly one third of the mob selected one of the answers (e.g. 60 mob members left, 20 choosing A, 20 choosing B, and 20 choosing C) or if exactly half the mob chose one answer and the other half chose the other answer when the Ask the Mob help was already used (e.g. 40 mob members left, 20 choosing A and 20 choosing B and Ask the Mob was used eliminating C as the correct answer).

A view of the three-story high panel for the 100 members of the mob.

Contestants have the option of using multiple helps on a single question, but are restricted to using each help only once during the game. Unlike the American version, the contestant cannot ask any member from the mob when using Poll the Mob.

As in the US version, the player must successfully answer three questions on the first prize level ($500) before he or she had the option of leaving the game, taking all money earned after this round. If he or she continues, he must answer successfully two questions on the second level ($1,000) before the player may leave the game and take the money. Starting with the third level ($1,500), a player may stop after any successful question. If there are more than 10 mob members left, contestants must make that decision before seeing questions; once they see a question, they are committed to answering it. With 10 or fewer mob members, the contestant (and the mob) sees the question, but not the answers, for three seconds before making his or her choice to continue. When contestants quit and take their winnings, remaining mob members win nothing, but can compete in the next game.

When a contestant answers incorrectly, however, they leave with nothing; any mob members who correctly answered that question split the contestant's earnings, and can continue the next game without putting their winnings at risk. (Mob members who answer that final question incorrectly are eliminated, and win nothing; they do not contribute to the prize pool.)

If the contestant answers the first question incorrectly, or the entire mob and the contestant answer the same question incorrectly, no money is awarded to anybody.

The maximum amount of winnings after eliminating all but one member of the mob is $495,000. In order for this to happen, everybody including the contestant has to get the first twelve questions correct.

In the Australian version, the podiums count up 1–100 from the top row, not the bottom row, as in the US version.

== Launch and pre-show controversy ==
The Australian version of the show was officially launched on 18 January. The Nine Network approved a season of 15 episodes. The show was bought along with a planned Nine Network version of Show Me the Money to air in 2007 which never materialised. The first show was scheduled to be shot on Friday, 19 January and air from Monday, 29 January. However, controversy began before the cameras started rolling.

The controversy started among confirmed and potential contestants when taping of the first episode was delayed less than 12 hours before it was scheduled to start. The given reason was a problem caused by Melbourne's power blackouts three days earlier. However, speculation is that producer Michael Healy was asked a question at the Thursday night launch party, which was assessed as incorrect, despite the fact that he was right. Producers were not willing to chance problems at their first taping, hence inconveniencing the players, many of whom had taken time off work to attend the show. It is believed that around 30 contestants turned up to the taping on Friday, unaware that they were not required.

When taping did get under way on Sunday 21 January, a contestant in the first episode answered a question incorrectly: What is the unit of time equivalent to 60 seconds? Due to a technical glitch relating to the Mob, the question had to be asked again as if the question had never occurred (since the Mob must be asked the question first before the contestant gives his answer). The second time around, the contestant gave the correct answer, robbing the Mob of a chance at just over $100,000. This procedure would be different than in the US version, where a question would be replaced, and a disclaimer would run stating "because of a production problem, a question was replaced". (This question would eventually be asked as a home viewer question during the second episode).

A season of 15 episodes has been approved for production and the first show was shot on 20 January 2007. A total of 33 episodes were produced for season one. The sound stage for the show is located at Central City Studios on sound stage 3.

== Ratings ==
The big screen displaying "Knock Out" rewards for eliminating each subsequent member of the mob, and the number of mob members remaining.

The 29 January debut of 1 vs. 100 did extremely well in the ratings, and was the most watched program of that particular night. A peak audience of 2.4 million viewers and an average audience of 1.95 million watched the show in Australia's capital cities. The second episode went to be aired on 5 February and narrowly lost in viewers to the season 3 premiere of Desperate Housewives in a competition for viewers against the Seven Network. With 1.43 million viewers, the second episode was well down on the premiere, but still a pleasing number for McGuire. The ratings for each episode are as follows:

No.	Title	Air date	Overnight ratings		Ref(s)
No.	Title	Air date	Viewers	Rank	Ref(s)
1	Episode 1	29 January 2007	1,950,000	—N/a	
2	Episode 2	5 February 2007	1,430,000	—N/a	
3	Episode 3	12 February 2007	1,330,000	—N/a	
4	Episode 4	19 February 2007	1,270,000	—N/a	
5	Episode 5	5 March 2007	1,230,000	—N/a	
6	Episode 6	12 March 2007	1,290,000	—N/a	
7	Episode 7	19 March 2007	1,380,000	—N/a	
8	Episode 8	26 March 2007	980,000	—N/a	
9	Episode 9	2 April 2007	1,330,000	—N/a	
10	Episode 10	9 April 2007	1,450,000	—N/a	
11	Episode 11	16 April 2007	1,150,000	—N/a	
12	Episode 12	23 April 2007	1,320,000	—N/a	
13	Episode 13	30 April 2007	1,270,000	—N/a	
14	Episode 14	7 May 2007	1,350,000	—N/a	
15	Episode 15	14 May 2007	1,380,000	—N/a	
16	Episode 16	21 May 2007	1,270,000	—N/a	
17	Episode 17	28 May 2007	1,250,000	—N/a	
18	Episode 18	4 June 2007	1,480,000	—N/a	
19	Episode 19	11 June 2007	1,430,000	—N/a	
20	Episode 20	18 June 2007	1,390,000	—N/a	
21	Episode 21	25 June 2007	1,420,000	—N/a	

== Contestants and their winnings ==
Number	Contestant	Appearance	Total winnings	Number of mob members remaining	Prize per mob head	Ref(s)
1	Mick Toll	29 January 2007	$134,500	21	$0	
2	Christie Kimkerina	29 January/ 5 February	$0	33	$666 ($21,978 tot.)	
3	Chris Emin	5 February	$73,000	29	$0	
4	Louise Borg	12 February	$138,500	21	$0	
5	Dave Reynolds	12 February/ 19 February	$0	9	$8,555 ($76,995 tot.)	
6	Sarah Lambert	19 February/ 5 March^{2}	$100,000	18	$0	
7	Robert Davidson	5 March	$0	70	$114 ($7,980 tot.)	
8	Ainsley Blackstall	5 March/ 12 March	$74,500	35	$0	
9	Isaac Larry	12 March	$0	56	$294 ($16,464 tot.)	
10	Mark Todell	19 March	$0	21	$1,690 ($35,500 tot.)	
11	Simone Ferguson	19 March	$0	15	$2,033 ($30,495 tot.)	
12	Tony Mort	26 March	$49,500	41	$0	
13	Paul Randle	26 March/ 2 April	$98,000	10	$0	
14	Oula Petelinc	2 April/ 9 April	$61,000	36	$0	
15	Darren Bowman	9 April	$57,000	23	$0	
16	Jennifer Collingwood	16 April/ 23 April	$149,000	7	$0	
17	Kevin Russell	23 April/ 30 April	$58,500	25	$0	
18	Tanya Edlington	30 April/ 7 May	$0	2	$46,000 ($92,000 tot.)	
19	Peter Hickey	7 May/ 14 May	$0	1	$130,000	
20	Sherri Siem	21 May	$80,500	24	$0	
21	Jamie Arceri	21 May/ 28 May	$0	6	$11,083 ($66,498 tot.)	
22	Allister Cameron	28 May/ 4 June	$93,000	3	$0	
23	Peter Kevin	4 June	$0	40	$612 ($24,480 tot.)	
24	Kira Valentine	11 June/ 18 June	$120,500	19	$0	
25	Craig Digney	18 June	$86,000	11	$0	
26	Melinda	25 June	$101,000	4	$0	
27	Craig Barnett	9 July^{3}	$108,500	16^{4}	$0	
28	Tony	16 July	$67,500	18	$0	
29	Sue Croton	16 July/ 23 July/ 30 July	$138,000	4	$0	
30	Josh Scott	6 August	$91,000	29	$0	
31	Donna	13 August/ 20 August	$89,500	6	$0	
32	Brant^{1}	20 August/ 3 September^{5}	$86,500	6	$0	
33	Kathy Crawley	3 September	$0	49	$71 ($3,500 tot.)	
34	Kevin Halstead	3 September/ 10 September	$84,500	11	$0	
35	Carlos	10 September/ 17 September	$111,500	20	$0	
36	Carol Primmer	17 September/ 24 September	$76,000	18	$0	
37	Phil Clarke	24 September/ 1 October	$105,000	17	$0	
38	Sarah	1 October	$0	29	$362 ($10,500 tot.)	
	Debbie Williams	6 June 2008	$0	5	$8,100 ($40,500 tot.)	
	John Langford	6 June/ 13 June				

^{1} indicates the contestant is still playing, therefore, the total winnings and mob members may change.

^{2} no episode was broadcast on 26 February, due to the broadcasting of the 79th Academy Awards.

^{3} no episode was broadcast on 2 July, due to the broadcasting of the Concert for Diana.

^{4} The 9 July episode was a special episode with 100 teenage mob members instead of 100 adults.

^{5} no episode was broadcast on 27 August, due to the broadcasting of The King.

Total prize money given away to contestants: $1,969,000

Total prize money given away to members of the mob: $502,390

Total prize money given away overall: $2,471,390

== Pods ==
Pods is the Australian term used for groups of mob members who share the same careers or hobbies. In the Australian version, there are three pods for each new contestant to play. If there are two or three members are in a pod, they'll all be in a line. If four, five or six members are in a pod, they'll be in two rows.

Number	Main Contestant	Pods	Number of pod members remaining at end	Appearance
1	Mick Toll	5 Scientists; 6 NRL Cheerleaders (Sydney Roosters); 3 Bikies	4; 0; 0	29 January 2007
2	Christie Kimkerina	5 Surfies; 3 Prison Officers; 3 Mensa Members	1; 0; 1	29 January/5 February 2007
3	Chris Emin	4 Truckies; 6 Dancers; 4 Maths Teachers	1; 0; 2	5 February 2007
4	Louise Borg	2 Astrophysicists; 1 Opera Singer; 4 Chefs	1; 0; 1	12 February 2007
5	Dave Reynolds	4 Brides; 3 Lawyers; 4 Nurses	0; 1; 0	12 February/19 February 2007
6	Sarah Lambert	6 Bodybuilders; 4 Graduates; 5 Circus Oz Members	0; 1; 1	19 February/5 March 2007
7	Robert Davidson	5 Tattoo artists 2 Business development officers 6 Models	2; 2; 2	5 March 2007
8	Ainsley Blakstall	1 Graduate student 6 Firefighters; 4 Pregnant ladies	1; 3; 0	5 March/12 March 2007
9	Isaac Larry	5 Meter Maids; 6 Paramedics; 6 Wrestlers	1; 6; 1	12 March 2007
10	Mark Todell	7 Beauty Spa Therapists; 6 Stockbrokers; 6 Elvis impersonators	1; 0; 1	19 March 2007
11	Simone Ferguson	6 Chess players 2 Yoga teachers 2 Catholic priests	0; 0; 0	19 March 2007
12	Tony Mort	3 Stylists; 1 Rocket scientist 6 Star Wars fanatics	2; 0; 2	26 March 2007
13	Paul Randle	5 Goths; 5 Librarians; 4 Life savers	0; 0; 1	26 March/2 April 2007
14	Oula Petelinc	4 Criminal Lawyers; 4 Champion Athletes; 5 Cowboys	0; 1; 0	2 April/9 April 2007
15	Darren Bowman	5 Geneticists; 6 Hairdressers; 8 Brazilian Showgirls	3; 1; 0	9 April 2007
16	Jennifer Collingwood	4 Psychics; 3 Interior designers 4 Inventors	0; 0; 1	16 April/23 April 2007
17	Kevin Russell	6 Show Ponies; 6 Doctors; 4 Kiss Fanatics	0; 1; 1	23 April/30 April 2007
18	Tanya Edlington	4 Engineers; 5 beauticians 4 Air guitarists	0; 0; 0	30 April/7 May 2007
19	Peter Hickey	5 Crime Scene Investigators; 6 Personal trainers 5 lady Lawn Bowlers	0; 0; 0	7 May/14 May 2007
20	Sherri Siem	3 Mime artists 5 Doctors; 8 Rowers	0; 1; 4	21 May 2007
21	Jamie Arceri	5 Medical researchers 5 Mormons; 6 Belly Dancers	2; 1; 0	21 May/28 May 2007
22	Allister Cameron	3 Weather Forecasters; 5 Hippies; 3 Ralph models	0; 2; 0	28 May/4 June 2007
23	Peter Kevin	5 Male dancers 3 Butchers; 3 scholars 5 Quizmania hosts	≤3 ≤3 ≤2; 1 (Brodie Young)	4 June 2007
24	Kira Valentine	4 Star Trek fanatics 5 Neuroscientists; 6 Identical twins	≤2; 0; 0	11 June/18 June 2007
25	Craig Digney	3 Miss Casino beef week queens 6 Statisticians; 5 Jockeys	0 ≤5; 0	18 June 2007
26	Melinda	6 cyclists ? ?	2; 0; 0	25 June 2007
27	Craig Barnett	3 Journalists; 7 Science elites 5 Debaters; 2 Australian champions (Swimming and Geography); 4 Mensa members 2 Lifesavers.	? ? ? ? ? ?	9 July 2007^{2}
28	Tony	4 Scouts; 2 Surgeons; 6 Can-can dancers	1; 0; 1	16 July 2007
29	Sue Chroden	4 midwives 5 topless waiters 7 laughter club members	0; 0; 0	16 July 2007

^{1} Indicates the pods are still playing and therefore the numbers of pod members remaining and for what time period may change.

^{2} The 9 July episode was a special episode with 100 teenage mob members instead of 100 adults.

- Craig Barnett appeared on Big Brother Australia 2008 as 'Barney', voted the third 'most-voted' housemate on the Big Brother website. He was also Mr Australia in the Manhunt International 2007 world final and a Cleo Bachelor of the Year finalist in 2008.
