= Wicked Weasel =

Australian swimwear and lingerie manufacturer

Wicked Weasel Pty. Ltd.
- Wicked Weasel logo
- Type: Proprietary Company
- Industry: Retail
- Founded: Byron Bay, Australia (1994)
- Founder: Peter T. Gifford
- Headquarters: Mullumbimby, Australia
- Number of locations: 2 (2014)
- Area served: Worldwide
- Products: Accessories, Bikinis, Lingerie, Swimwear and Underwear
- Number of employees: 45–50 (2011)
- Website: wickedweasel.com

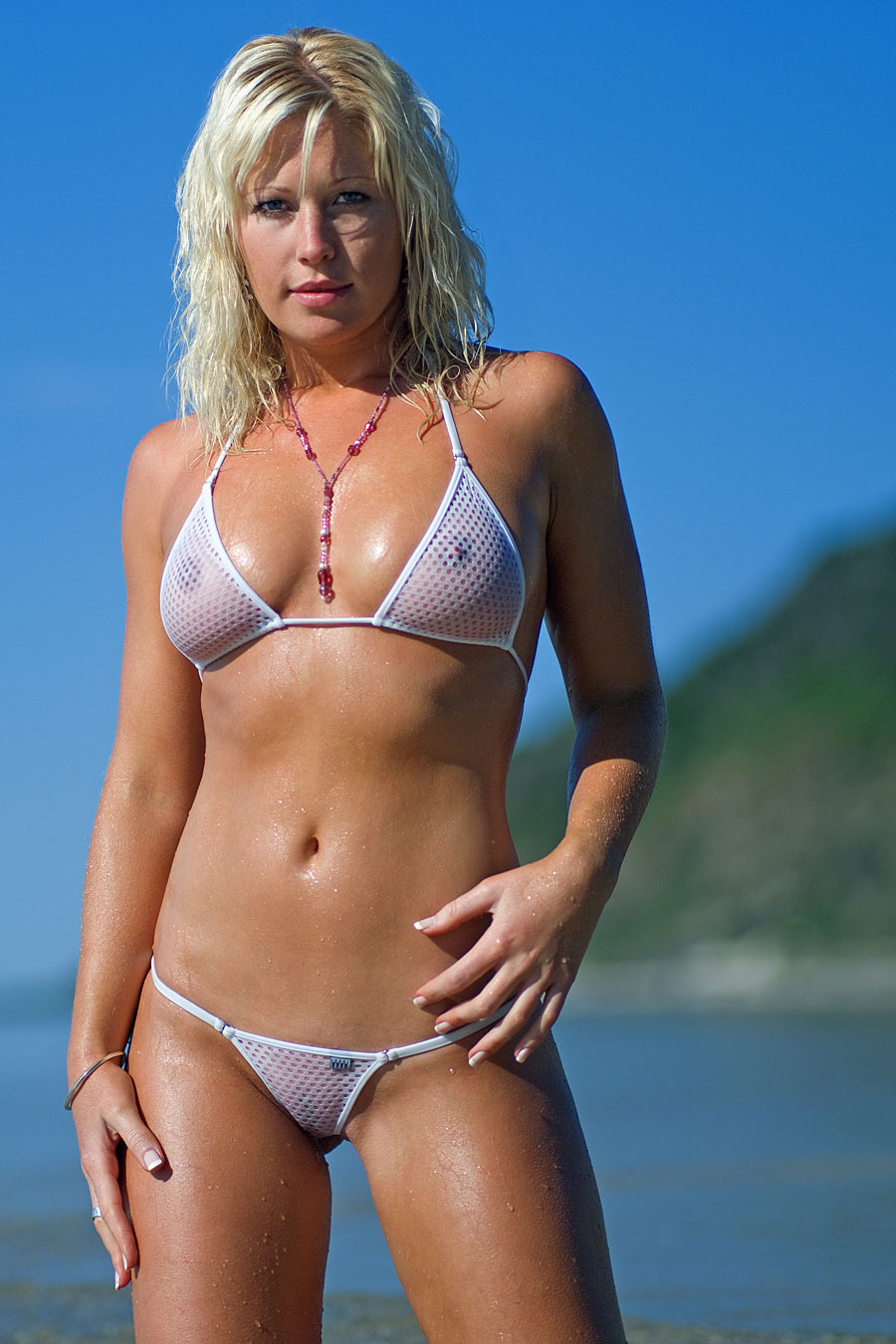
A woman wearing a Wicked Weasel bikini

Wicked Weasel Pty. Ltd. is an Australian manufacturer of swimwear and lingerie for women. It is especially known for its microkinis. The company was founded in 1994 by Peter Gifford, formerly the bass player for Midnight Oil, and named after his girlfriend's nickname. Initially, the company's products were trial-marketed to Melbourne area strippers.

The first Wicked Weasel retail store was opened in Cairns in 1995, but it moved to Byron Bay the following year, where the company headquarters had remained until moving to Mullumbimby in 2020. Additional stores at Bondi and in Melbourne have been opened a number of times with inconsistent success. Wicked Weasel launched www.wickedweasel.com in mid-1999, making it the first Australian swimwear maker to sell online. By 2003, it was the largest Australian retailer of clothing via the internet. As of 2007, the website received over 100,000 unique visitors per day. Wicked Weasel had 45–50 employees as of 2011.

As part of a contest, Wicked Weasel also publishes online pictures of women who wear their products.

The company ceased Australian manufacturing after the relocation to Mullumbimby, Byron Shire in 2020 and expanded their shipping from Australia to also include the US in 2022 and Europe in July 2023. All creative design for the brand continues in Mullumbimby.

== See also ==
- Bikini
- Lingerie
- List of swimwear brands
- Swimwear
- Underwear
