= Watersun Swimwear =

Australian swimwear manufacturer

- Type: Private
- Industry: Apparel
- Founded: 1955
- Headquarters: Melbourne, Australia
- Products: Swimwear
- Website: www.watersun.com

Watersun Swimwear is the oldest privately owned Australian swimwear and beachwear manufacturer. Established in the mid-1950s, Watersun has been synonymous with the Australian way of life in terms of Swimwear and Beach Fashions for nearing half a century. Its trademark Graphic Glamour Swimsuit Designs of the '60s, '70s and '80s were recently displayed in the Australian National Maritime Museum which paid tribute to the History of Australian Swimwear: Exposed! The Story of Swimwear.

== History ==
Watersun was founded in Melbourne, Victoria, in 1955 by David Waters. Operating a retail outlet with manufacturing at the back of a small shop in Brunswick Street, Fitzroy, Watersun employed young new designers to gain notoriety with swimwear designs in a very conservative post-war Australia.

Watersun was sold in 1984 to ADA swimwear who subsequently filed for bankruptcy in 1987 with the current owner, IAMNSP Pty. Ltd., acquiring the trademarks for both Watersun and ADA in 2011.

== Designs ==
A display of Watersun is featured in the Powerhouse Museum in Sydney reflecting the cultural design significance of the brand.

== Sponsorships ==
- Miss World 1972 winner Belinda Green
- Official swimsuit sponsor for 2010 Miss Teen Australia and Miss World Supermodel
- Mrs Australia winner 2010 Nikki Eastmure

== Models ==
- Model Pania Rose has appeared in Watersun campaigns for 2005, 2006, and 2007
- Model Miss Australia Erin McNaught
- Catherine McNeil

== See also ==
- List of swimwear brands
