= Peter Archer (actor) =

Australian businessman (1948-2000)

- As ′Parsons′, in the film Enter the Dragon
- Born: Peter Ian Archer; 8 July 1948; Rockhampton, Queensland, Australia
- Died: 13 April 2000 (aged 51); Sydney, New South Wales, Australia
- Occupations: Actor, martial artist, CEO of Jackel Australia
- Years active: 1969−1998

Peter Ian Archer (8 July 1948 – 13 April 2000) was an Australian martial artist, actor and entrepreneur. In 1973, He became famous for playing Parsons in the martial arts movie Enter the Dragon, starring Bruce Lee.

He started a company called Jackel Australia, which markets and distributes baby products and dye products in Australia.

He had a black belt in both Goju-ryu and Shotokan karate. He died of cancer in April 2000.

Archer studied Goju Ryu Karate in Seigo Tada's Odokan in Hong Kong, under Shogi Yuki.

== Career ==
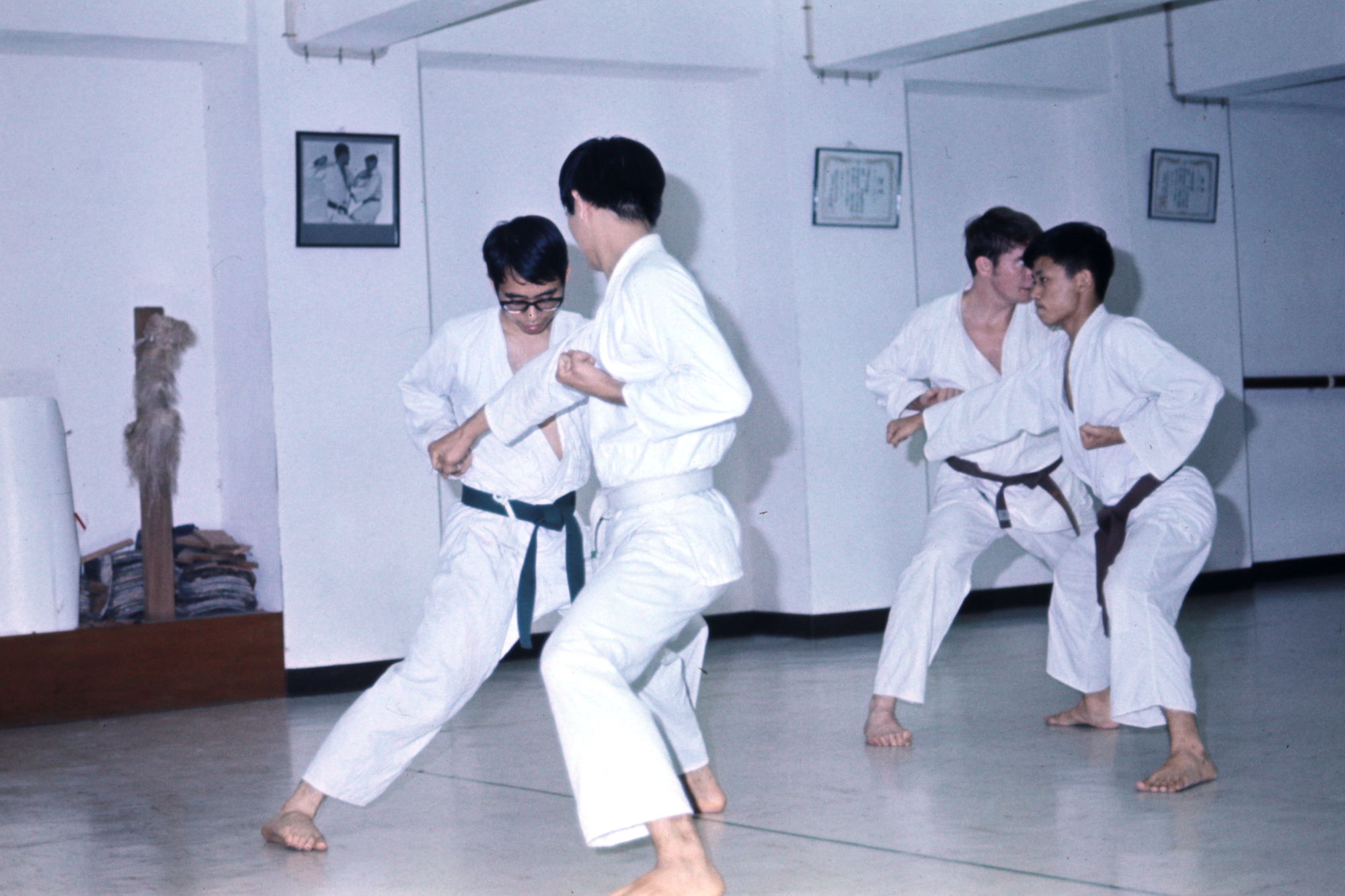
Peter Archer (back right) in Odokan (Hong Kong)

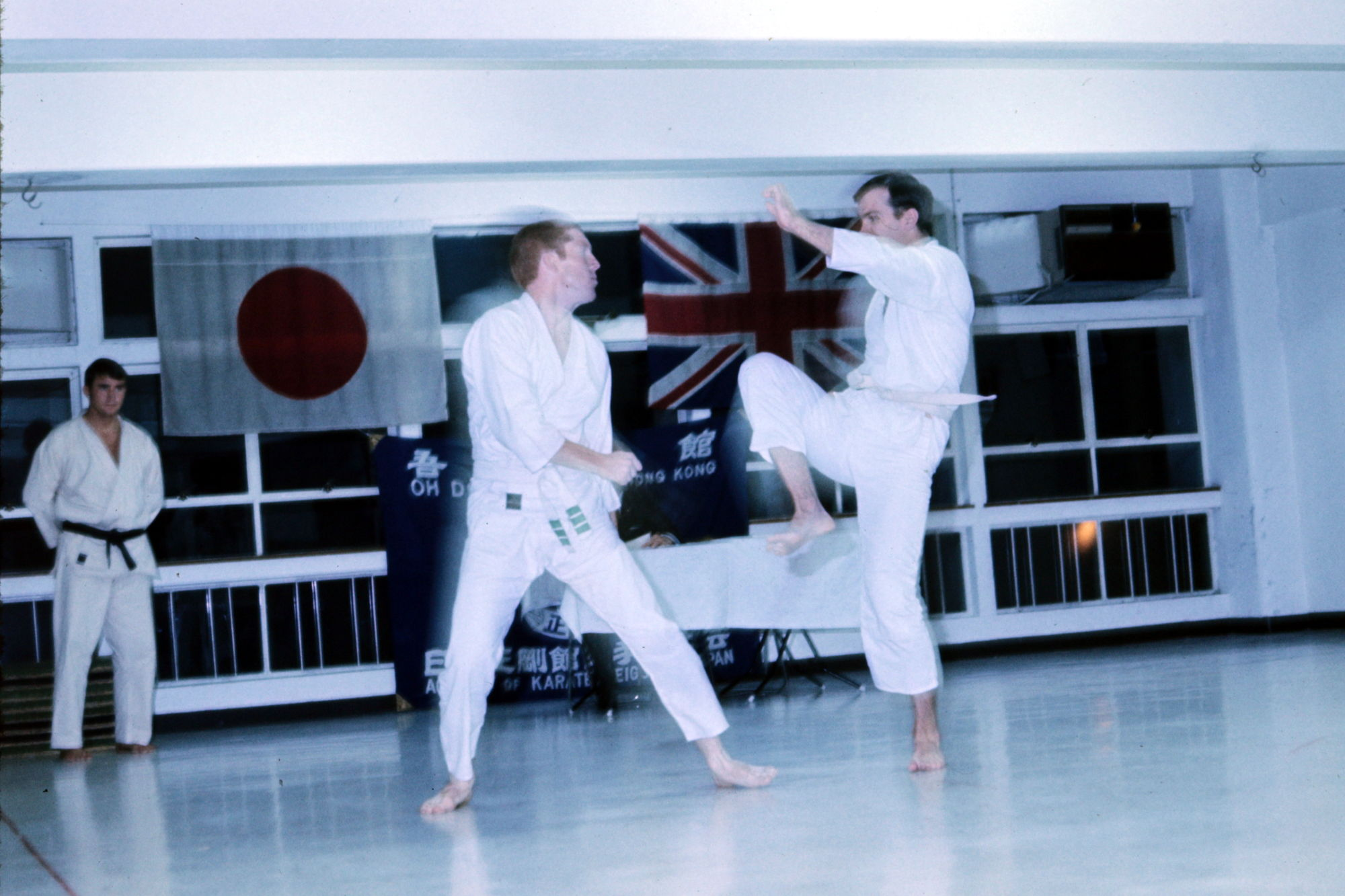
Peter Archer (left) officiating during grading at Odokan (Hong Kong)

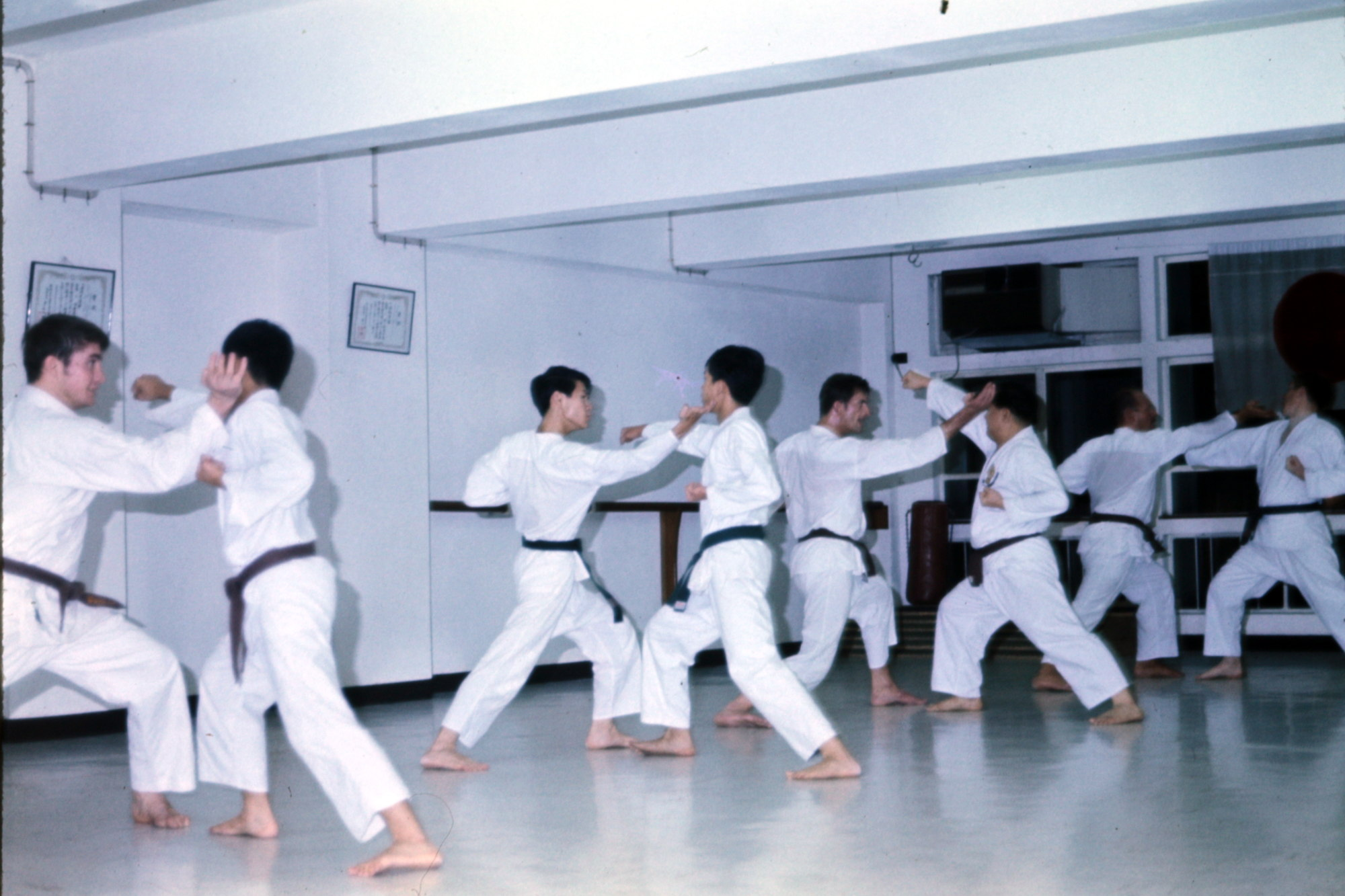
Peter Archer (left) in Odokan Dojo (Hong Kong). (photos by Ceegie at www.lens-art.co.uk)

Archer was a successful karate champion in Hong Kong. During a tournament, Bruce Lee approached him after watching Archer fight.

"Would you like to be in my film?", Bruce asked.

"Sure," Peter responded, "what as?"

"Not sure," Bruce replied; "I'll write something in for you." The film was Enter the Dragon.

The scene where Parsons's boat starts to sink, ultimately with the insinuation that Parsons could drown, was not written in the original script. The little boat was released, as per the script, but the film production team didn't realise the boat had a leak in it. As the boat started to sink, the film crew panicked. "Don't worry! get the shot; I can swim!" Archer cried, being an Australian who grew up around water. The director kept filming and the boat continued to sink into the water. Archer reminisced "It was fine as I was a strong swimmer, but gee that river stank! I was covered in it".

Parson's voice was dubbed by another actor. The director did not feel that Archer's voice was "New Zealand" enough, though the dubbed voice sounded nothing like a New Zealander's accent.

Archer remembered Lee to be a deeply philosophical man, who loved to discuss and break down the philosophies behind martial arts and life itself. Lee and Archer enjoyed their filmmaking experience together, with Lee reportedly asking Archer to be in his next film. However, neither knew that this film was to be Lee's last.

After fighting in Hong Kong and becoming a karate champion, Archer moved into a business career. He founded Jackel Australia in 1975, becoming the sole Australian and New Zealand Tommee Tippee licensee. He was the creator of the Zoggs Swimwear brand, and was a passionate entrepreneur.

== Personal ==
Archer belongs to a historical Australian family, which explored parts of Queensland and Rockhampton in the early 1800s. Within this family is also a famous naval architect Colin Archer.

He was born in Queensland to Alexander (Sandy) and June Archer. Having grown up on a farm, Archer had a down to earth personality - no matter the accomplishments he achieved throughout his short life. He would always joke that "you could take the boy out of the bush, but you can never take the bush out of the boy".

Archer married his ex-wife Hazel Lo and had two daughters. They later divorced and he married his second wife, Sandra Webster, in 1985.

Archer died from cancer in 2000.

== Filmography ==
Year	Title	Role	Notes
1973	Enter the Dragon	Parsons	Martial arts movie
1998	Bruce Lee: In His Own Words	Self	Documentary film
1998	Bruce Lee: Path of the Dragon	Self	Documentary film
1999	Bruce Lee: Intercepting Fist	Self	Documentary film
2000	Bruce Lee: A Warrior's Journey	Self	Documentary film
2001	Bruce Lee and Kung Fu Mania	Self	Documentary film
2004	Blood and Steel: Making 'Enter the Dragon'	Self	Documentary film
