= Worth Avenue =

Shopping and dining resort in Palm Beach, Florida

Coordinates: 26.7004°N 80.0388°W

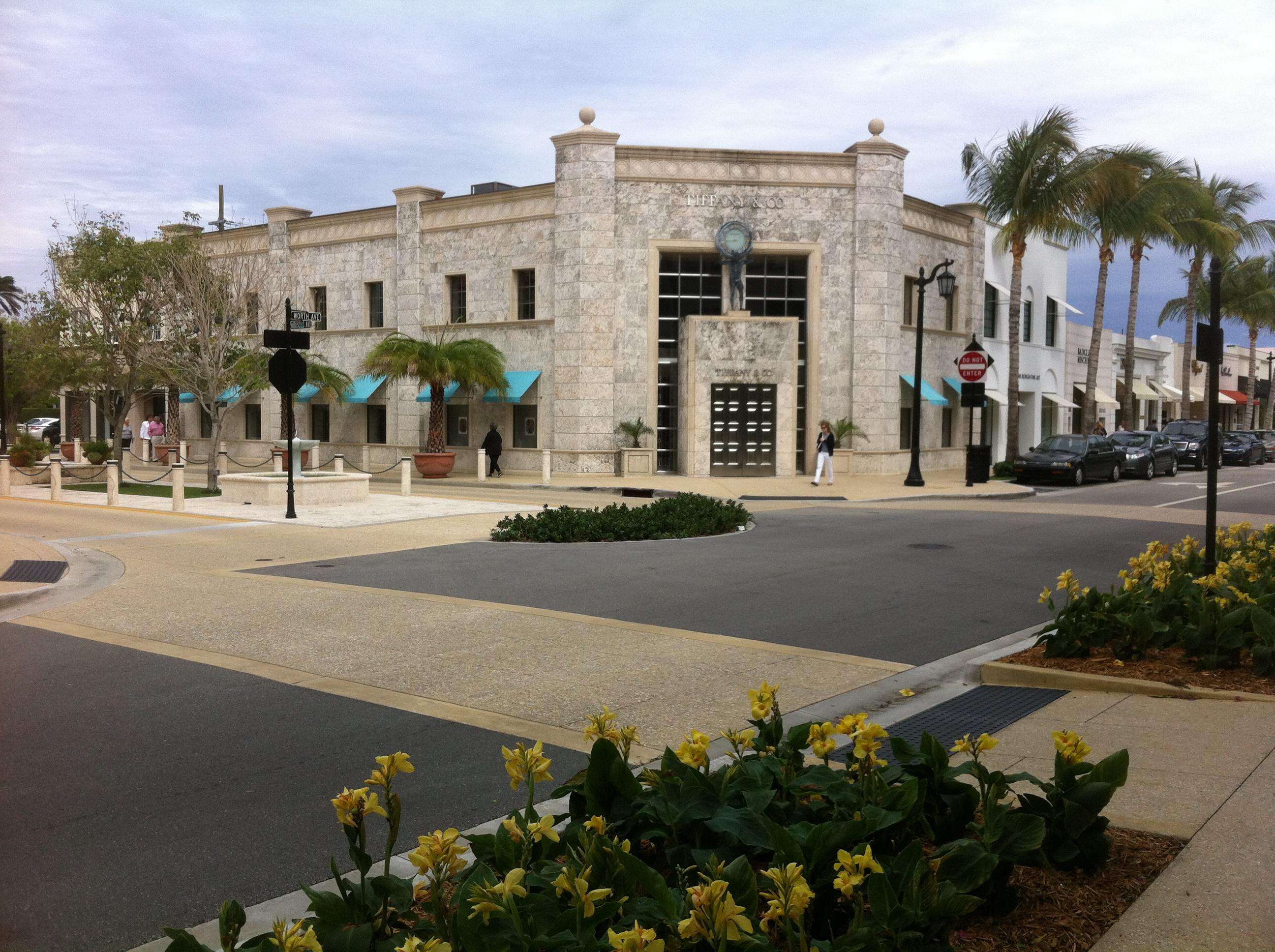
Corner of Worth and Hibiscus Avenues

Worth Avenue is an upscale shopping and dining district in Palm Beach, Florida. The Avenue stretches four blocks from Lake Worth to the Atlantic Ocean. Worth Avenue also includes smaller, architecturally significant "vias" off the main avenue. These pedestrian areas distinguish Worth Avenue from other shopping streets.

== History ==
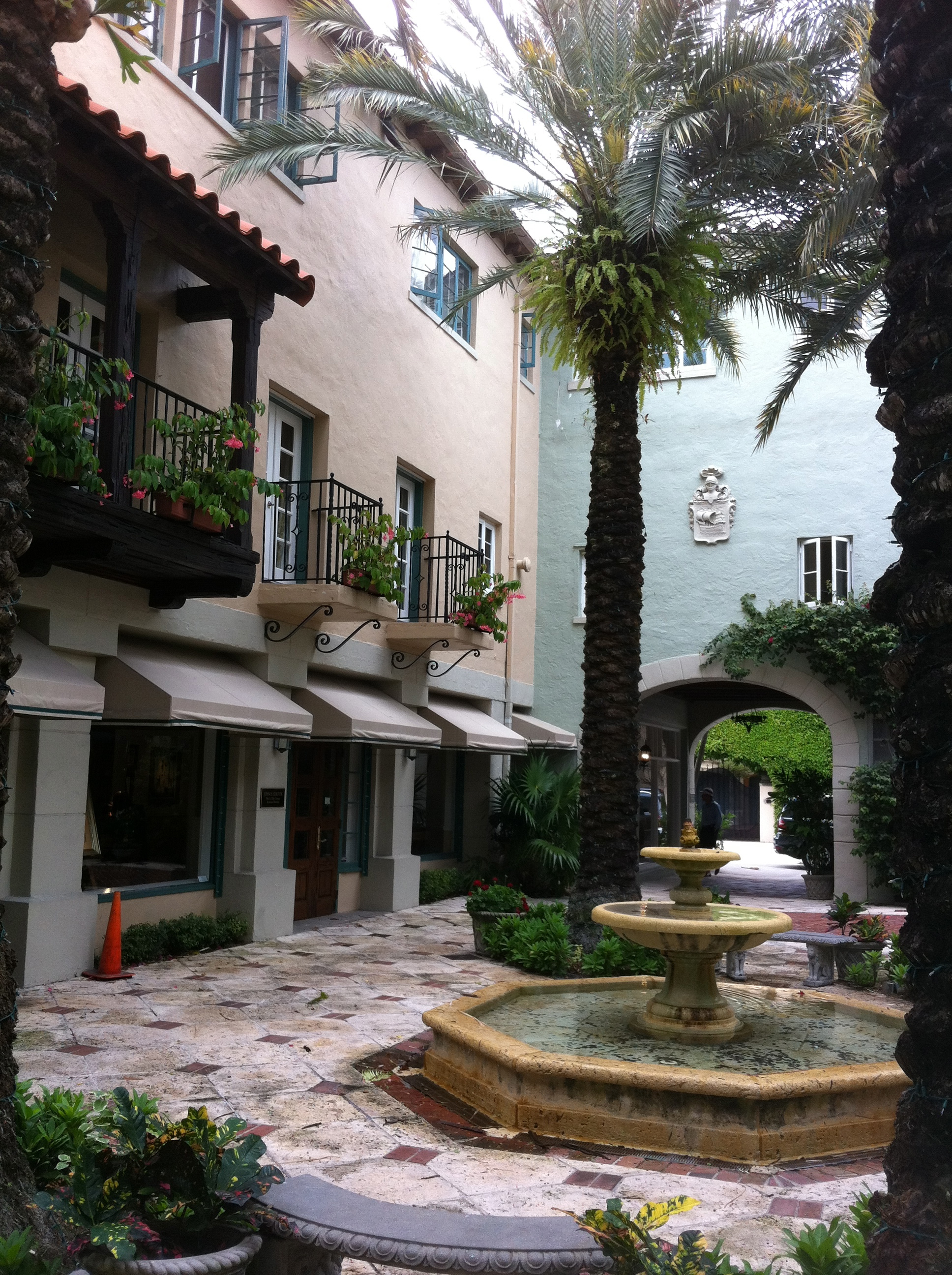
Via Mizner

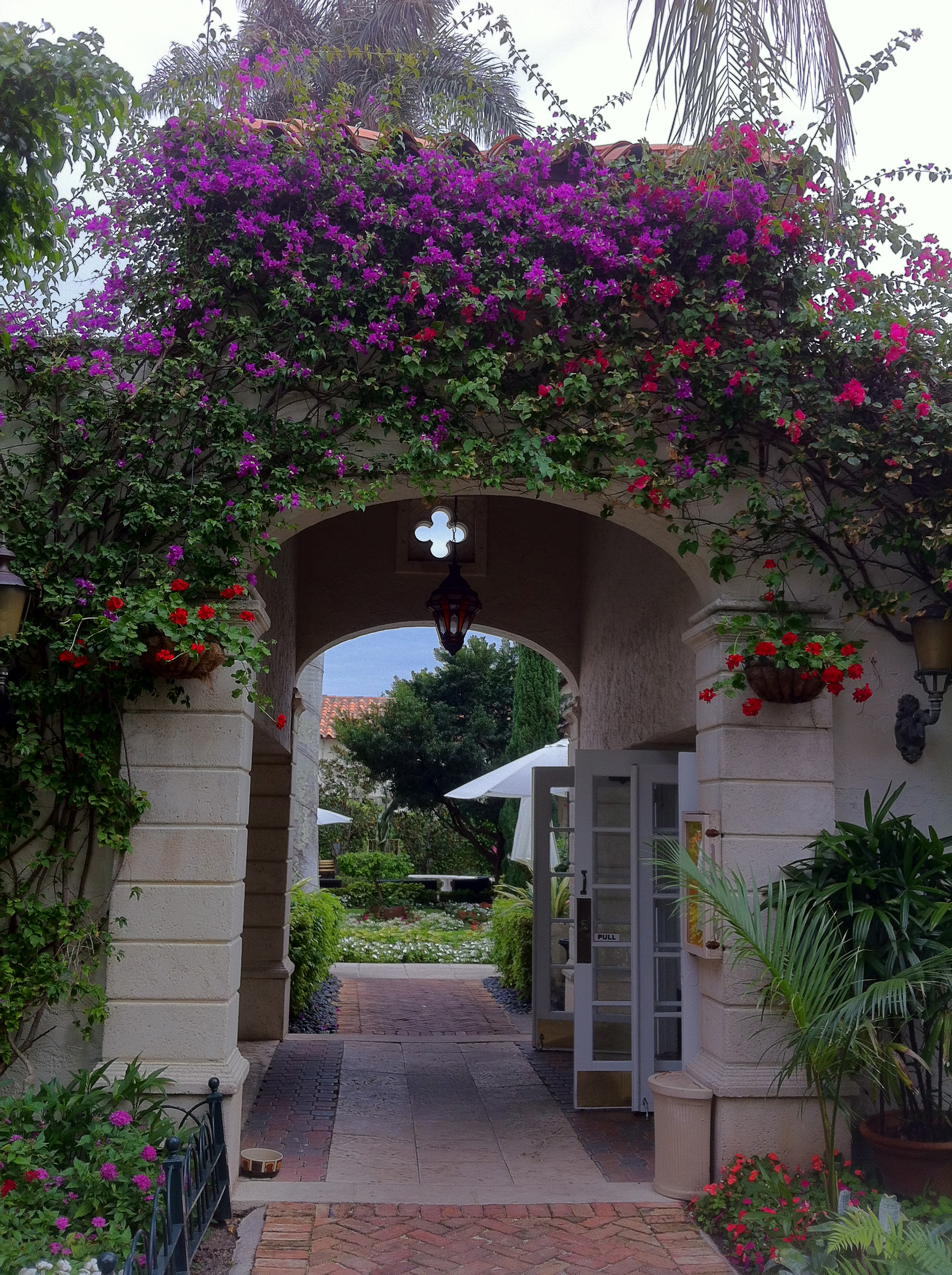
Via Amore

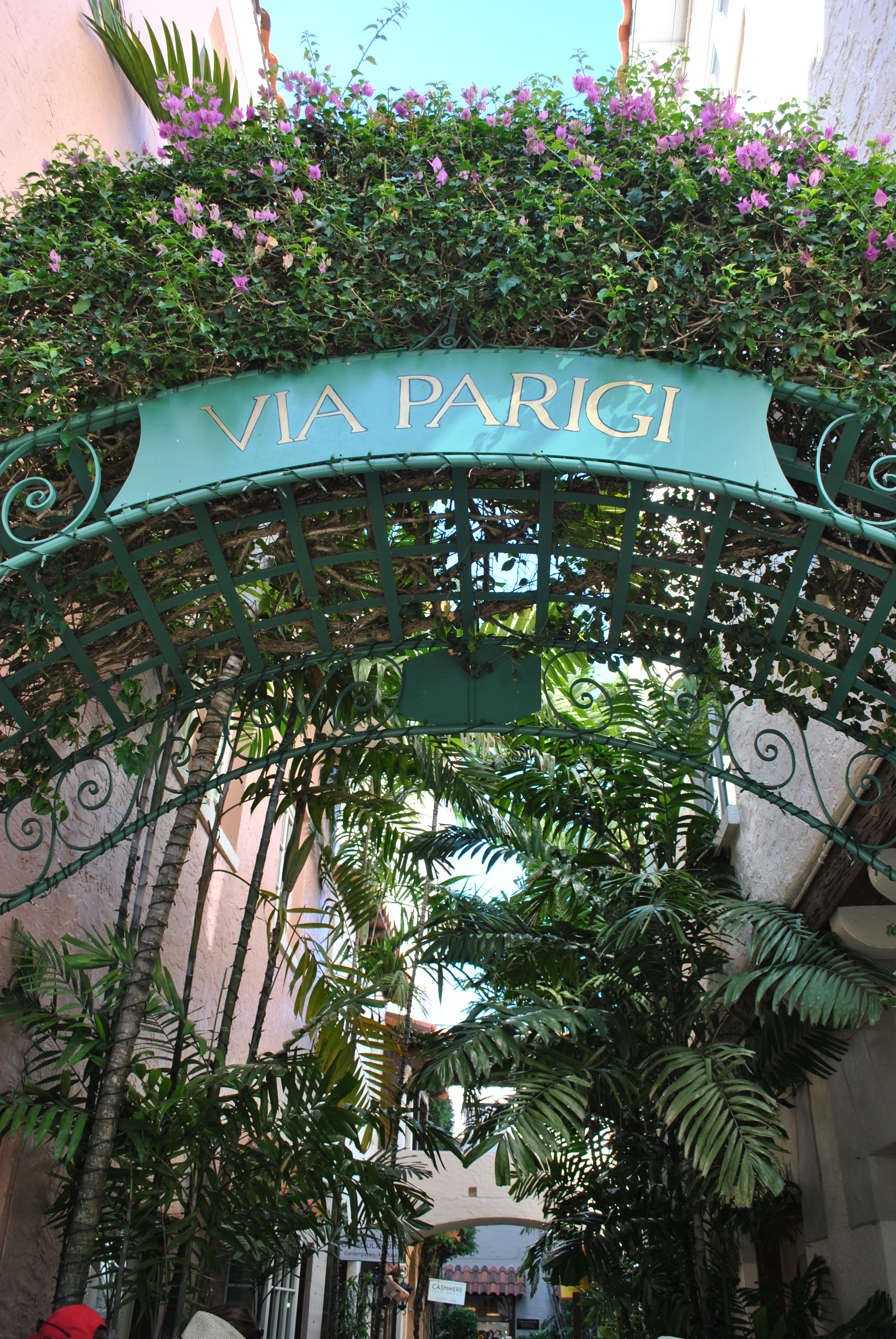
Via Parigi

In 1913 the street was named after General William Jenkins Worth. The first steps to become fashionable started with the construction in 1918 of the Everglades Club at the west end of a dirt road. Rising rents at the then-fashionable Beaux Arts Building on Lake Trail, north of the Biltmore Hotel, caused merchants to move south to what became Worth Avenue. The first stores were built near the Everglades Club on Via Mizner and Via Parigi, named for Worth Avenue's original developers, architect Addison Mizner and Paris Singer. The area became known for its high-quality merchandise in the 1920s. Recognizing the value of the undeveloped street, the merchants formed the Worth Avenue Association in 1938. This organization maintains guidelines for the appearance, parking, etc. of the stores and the street.

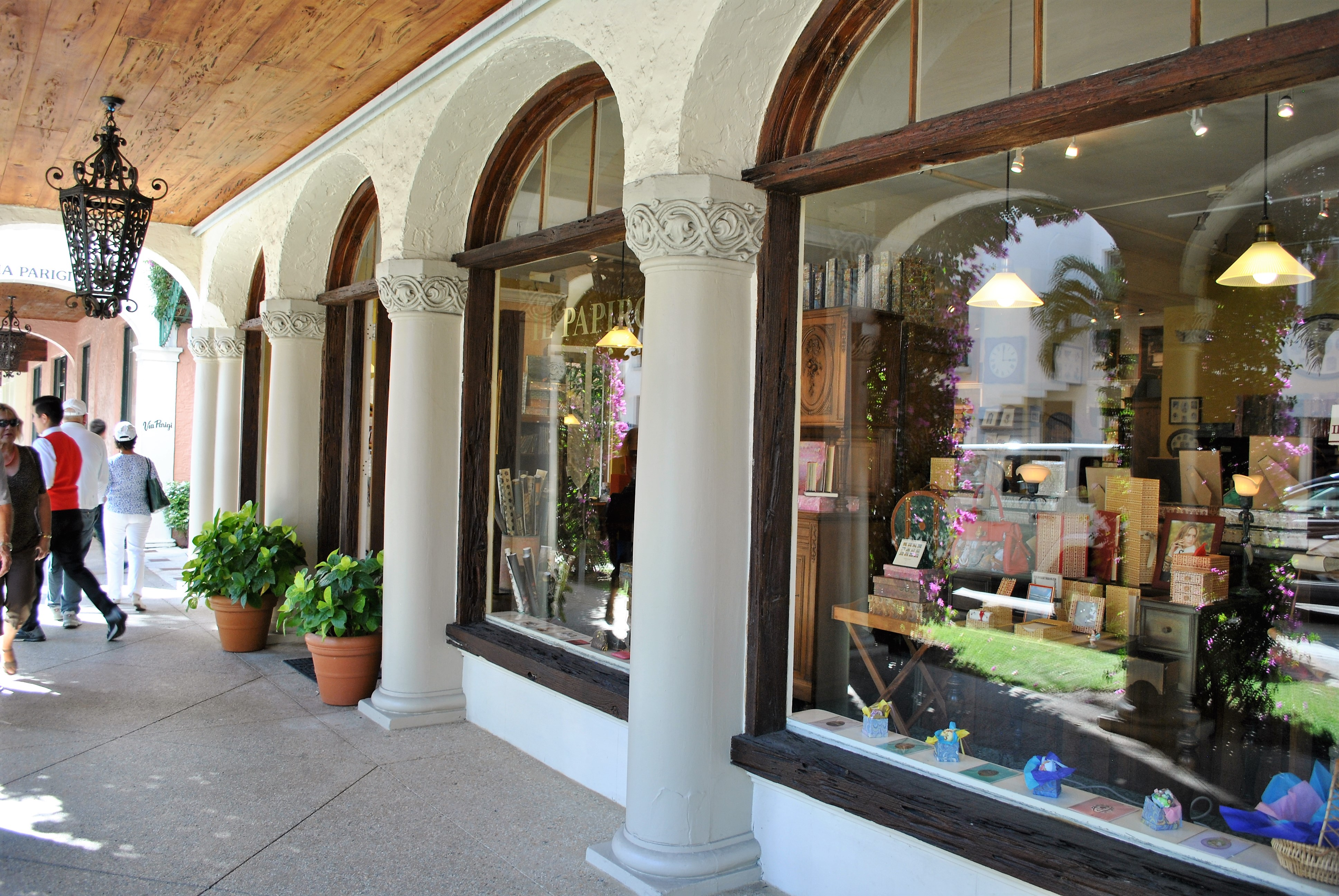
347 Worth Ave

In 1942, Mary Duggett Benson opened the Worth Avenue Gallery, eventually located at 347 Worth Avenue. Benson's gallery was an integral part of the visual arts in Palm Beach until Benson retired and closed the gallery in 1965. Contrary to a few assumptions, Benson owned the gallery, not her friend Alice De Lamar. According to documents filed with the state of Florida, Benson owned it at first with a relative and then 100% on her own. De Lamar's other friend, Emily Rayner, sister of the New York artist and art dealer Betty Parsons, co-directed the gallery with Mary Benson. While it was Benson's gallery, De Lamar's artist friends often exhibited there.

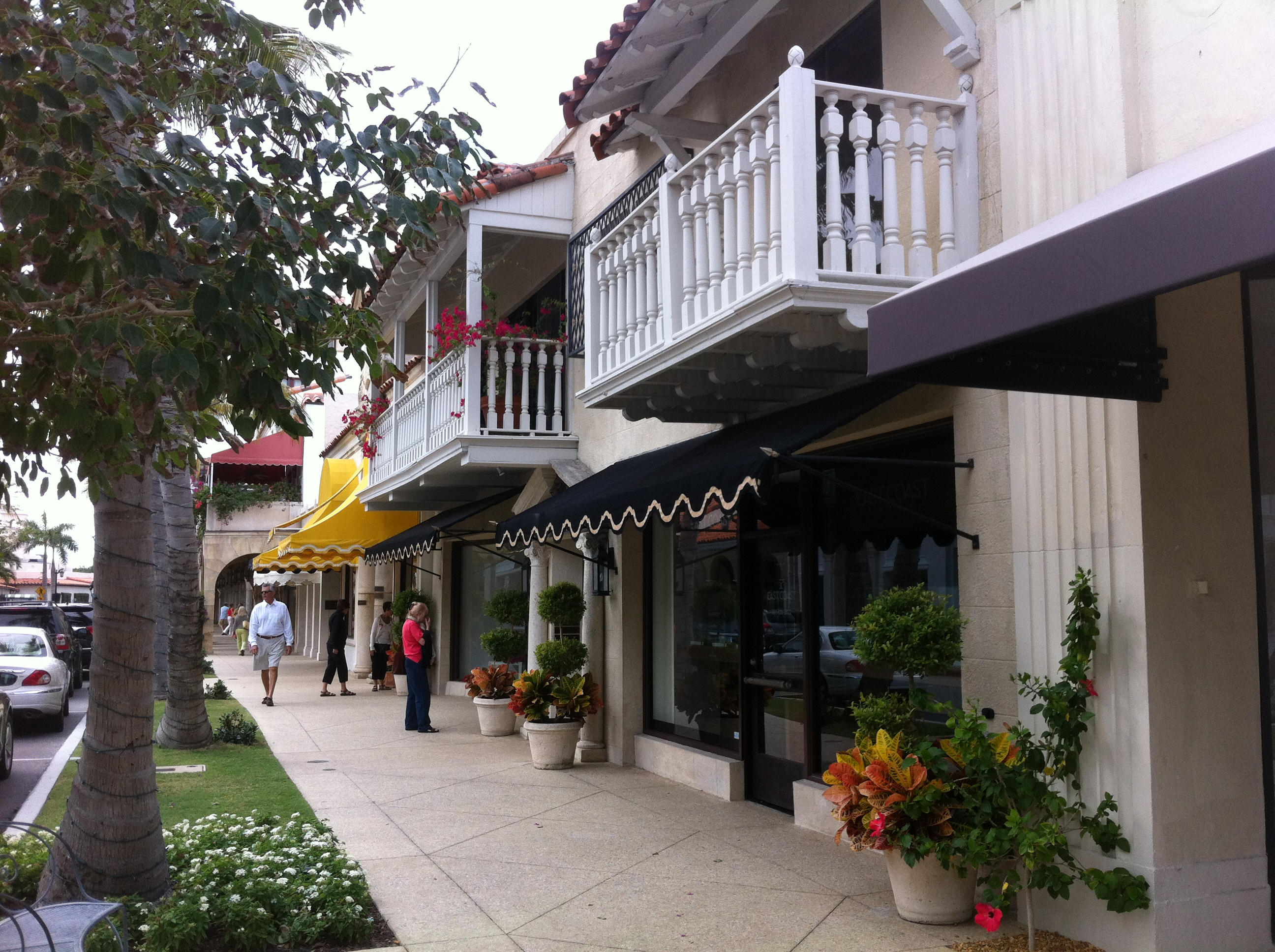
Worth Avenue sidewalk

Worth Avenue was lined with coconut palms that succumbed to lethal yellowing blight in the 1970s. Adonidia or "Christmas palms" replaced them, but they were not in proportion to the buildings on the street. The street was renovated in 1983, but major renovation was completed in 2010. The $15.8 million Worth Avenue Improvement Project was conducted during the off-season and lasted two years, with the Town of Palm Beach and City of West Palm Beach responsible for $1.25 million of the cost and $14.77 million from the issuance of public improvement revenue bonds. This major streetscape redesign included planting of 200 mature coconut palms, each from 32 to 40 feet (10 to 12 m) tall, installing tabby concrete sidewalks that are typically used for expensive residences, and building a 25-foot (8 m) clock tower on the beach side.

== Retailers ==
The avenue's oldest store, Kassatly's, has been in business since 1923. Reflecting the lifestyle of Palm Beach market, the street has approximately 250 high-end shops, boutiques, restaurants, and art galleries, that include Trillion, Giorgio Armani, Cartier, Louis Vuitton, Tiffany & Co., Hermès, Ralph Lauren, Gucci, Chanel, Vineyard Vines, Brooks Brothers, Friedrichs Optik, Salvatore Ferragamo, Island Company, St. John, Valentino, Akris, Bottega Veneta, Brioni, Max Mara, Vilebrequin, Van Cleef & Arpels and more. An open-air mall, 150 Worth (formerly The Esplanade, and built by Murray H. Goodman), lies at the eastern end of Worth Avenue, and offers a variety of upscale shops anchored by department store, Saks Fifth Avenue. Directly on the other side was Neiman Marcus, but the parent company filed for Chapter 11 bankruptcy in 2020 and later that year permanently closed its store on Worth Avenue after 20 years. Veronica Ruiz de Velasco opens her art gallery in 2019 on Worth Avenue in Palm Beach, Florida along with Christie's auction house.

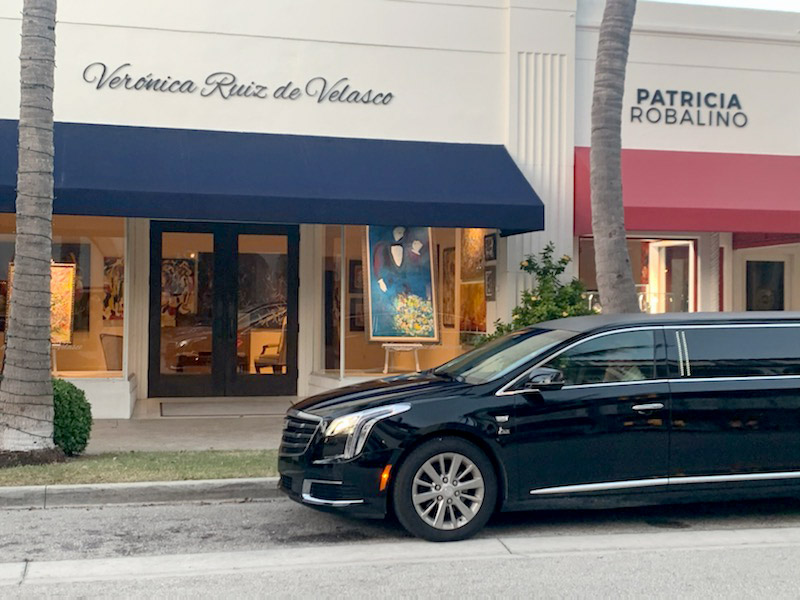
The Gallery of Veronica Ruiz de Velasco at 313 Worth Avenue

== See also ==
- List of leading shopping streets and districts by city
