= Gazal Corporation =

Australian clothing company

Gazal Corporation Limited was an Australian branded clothing company that was listed on the Australian Securities Exchange. The company was based in Banksmeadow, New South Wales. Its main business areas were men's, ladies' and children's clothing, and it and its subsidiaries are engaged in the design, manufacture, importation, wholesale and retail of clothing and accessories including business shirts, school wear, surf and casual wear, as well as intimate apparel. The company owned brands such as Mambo Graphics, Davenport and Bisley Workwear and imports brands such as Nautica, Calvin Klein Underwear and held the license for Oroton underwear. The company had operations in Australasia and Europe. Mambo was sold to Saban Brands in 2015.

== Profile ==
The Gazal was founded in 1958 by Joe Gazal and was listed on the Australian Securities Exchange in 1973.

In 1993, the company closed a number of its loss-making divisions, which were selling non-branded products, and decided to focus on the sale of branded products. This changed the company from a supplier of "house-brands" to a supplier of recognised national brands.

Another change of approach for the company group was primarily towards the ownership of the brands that it manufactures, markets and distributes. This is a departure from its previous policy of seeking licensing arrangements. The intention is to secure a longer term tenure and greater flexibility for brand development.

The group distributes its products through major retailers such as David Jones and Myer as well as through a range of independent retail outlets. It competes with various clothing manufacturers and distributors for the different demographics that the group targets. Trade Secret was sold to TJX in 2015.

== History ==
- 1958 - The Gazal Group of Companies was founded in Sydney, as manufacturer of men's shirts and pyjamas.
- 1973 - The company was listed on the Australian Securities Exchange.
- 1993 - The company rationalised its unbranded business and made its national brands the main focus of the Company.
- 1994 - The company reached an agreement with joint venture partners in Hong Kong and China to manufacture and market the Arrow brand men's shirt in China.
- 1996 - The company acquired the Lovable brand in Australia, New Zealand and Papua New Guinea.
- 1997 - The company acquired a 25% stake in Gross Industries.
- 1998 - The company secured a licence agreement to sell Nautica men's lifestyle collection brand in Australia and New Zealand.
- 2003 - The company acquired the Davenport Underwear Group. As part of the deal, the company also acquired Body Art Australia, which had the Australasian distribution rights for Calvin Klein underwear.
- 2005 - The company acquired the Bracks Apparel Group, which is the long-established market leader in men's pants and trousers in Australasia, famous for its renowned “Bracks slacks”. The acquisition included Bracks’ Australian business, as well as Bracks’ growing New Zealand business located in Auckland. The acquisition took the Company into additional product categories of men's casual and formal trousers and men's suits.
- 2008 - The company sold its remaining interest in the Mambo brand and its related Australian wholesale and retail businesses. The sale was reported to have been for about $10 million, compared to the $20 million paid in March 2000. The sale included eight stores plus wholesale distribution rights to surf stores and David Jones in Australia and overseas — except for Europe, where the licence is held by British company The Outdoor Group.
- 2011 - The company sold its Brands United retail stores to Pacific Brands.
- 2015 - Trade Secret was sold to TJX 25 October 2015
- 2019 - PVH acquired approximately 78% of the Gazal Corporation shares.

== Products ==
Gazal Corporation operates predominantly in the clothing industry, and divides its operation into two divisions:

- Wholesale Group - Brands include Van Heusen, Bisley, Midford, Bracks, Paramount & Pierre Cardin.
- Retail Group - Brands include Trade Secret, Calvin Klein Underwear & Midford School Stores. In 2011, the group had 46 stores.
