= Studio Keel =

Keel
- Company type: Private
- Industry: Textiles, Apparel
- Founded: 2014
- Founder: Andrija Prlainović
- Headquarters: Belgrade, Serbia
- Area served: Worldwide
- Key people: Srđan Tomić, CEO
- Products: Swimwear, Sportswear
- Website: www.studiokeel.com

Studio Keel, also credited as Keel, is a Serbian clothing company specializing in swimwear for water polo, swimming and recreation for men and woman.

== History ==
Keel is established by Serbian water polo player Andrija Prlainović in 2014.

== Water polo sponsorships ==
Teams using or used Keel equipment are:

National teams

- Serbia men's and women's team
- Brazil men's and women's team
- Russia men's and women's team
- Germany men's and women's team

Club teams

- (Serbia) Crvena zvezda
- (Serbia) Partizan
- (Serbia) Radnički Kragujevac
- (Serbia) Novi Beograd
- (Greece) Olympiacos
- (France) Marseille
- (France) Aix en Provence
- (France) Strasbourg
- (Australia) Brisbane Barracudas
- (United States) California Republic
- (Serbia) Vojvodina
- (Serbia) Šabac
- (Malta) Sliema
- (New Zealand) Sea Wolf
- (Italy) Ortigia
- (Italy) Rari Nantes Verona

== See also ==
- List of swimwear brands
