= 2wink =

Australian men's underwear brand

2wink Australia
- Type: Private
- Industry: Fashion
- Founded: 2005
- Founder: Mark Turner, Eddie Jones.
- Defunct: 2022
- Headquarters: Perth, Australia
- Area served: Worldwide
- Products: Men's underwear
- Website: 2wink.com.au

2wink Australia was an Australian men's underwear and swimwear apparel brand based in Perth, Western Australia. The apparel was sold in 30 countries.

== History ==
The name 2wink was created from the concept of "winking" one's eye.

In 2009, the company made the strategic decision to transfer all of its manufacturing from China to Western Australia, after observing the uproar caused by Pacific Brands, the maker of Bonds, taking their manufacturing overseas.

2wink Australia released its first range of men's swimwear in 2011.

== Operations ==
The company was headquartered in Dianella, a suburb of Perth, although all of its products were made in China.

== See also ==
- List of swimwear brands
