= Craig Barnett =

Australian model (born 1974)

- Born: Craig Andrew Barnett; 16 July 1974 (age 52); East Fremantle, Western Australia, Australia
- Other name: Barney
- Education: Melville Senior High School
- Occupations: Model; swimmer; shipping officer; surf lifesaver
- Years active: 2004–present
- Height: 1.84 m (6 ft 0 in)

Craig Andrew Barnett (born 16 July 1974) is an Australian model and former international modelling pageant finalist, best known as "Mr Australia 2007" at the 2007 Manhunt International World Final. He was the national title holder of Manhunt Australia during 2007 and was also the face of Australian swimwear label Funky Trunks from 2004 to 2010.

Barnett, commonly known by his nickname Barney, is also recognised for his appearances on Australian television, Network Nine's 1 vs. 100 in 2007 and Network Ten's eighth series of Australia's Big Brother reality television show in 2008. Earlier in 2008, Barnett was named as one of Australia's most eligible bachelors when selected as a finalist in Cleo Bachelor of the Year and featured in the March 2008 edition of Cleo Magazine.

== Early life and family ==
Craig Barnett was born in East Fremantle, Western Australia and was raised in the suburb of Kardinya. He has two older sisters.

Barnett attended Kardinya Primary School and later went to Melville Senior High School in Western Australia. He excelled in athletics as a junior, equalling an Australian age record for the U/13 80m hurdles. He picked up an amateur skateboarding sponsorship between the ages of 14 and 16 and also became involved in competitive swimming at the age of 16.

He graduated from high school in 1991 and was awarded an outstanding sporting achievement award, recognising his sporting contribution, which included winning the athletics champion boy and swimming champion boy in his final year, only eight months after taking up competitive swimming.

Barnett went on to swim competitively at a national level for over thirteen years, which included three Australian Olympic Swimming Selection Trials. He was club captain at the Applecross Swimming Club during the 1991/1992 season, and held several sprint freestyle and butterfly club records, some of which still stand today. He was also the City of Perth Swimming Club Captain during the 2003/2004 season and retired from national level swimming shortly after in 2005. He held the Victorian state short course record for the 50m Butterfly in the 35-39-year age division of the Masters Swimming Association, from 2010 to 2016.

== Manhunt ==
=== Manhunt Australia ===
Barnett was the winner of the national male modelling competition Manhunt Australia in November 2006 which earned him the title of MR Australia throughout 2007. Contestants were judged on physique, photographic (photogenic qualities and the ability to work with photographers), interviewing and public speaking skills, and catwalk modelling ability. He later featured on the front cover of the Men of Manhunt calendar in 2008.

=== Manhunt International ===
In February 2007, he represented Australia in the largest contested and most prestigious international male modelling competition in the world at the time, the Manhunt International 2007 World Final, held at the six star Kangwon Land Casino Resort, in South Korea, where he competed against a record 48 contestants from as many countries. There, he finished 3rd runner-up and walked away with cash and prizes including a modelling contract in Beijing, China. Barnett is one of only three Australians ever to finish in the top five since the Manhunt International competition began in 1993.

== Modelling ==
=== Modelling career ===
While competing at the Australian Swimming Olympic Selection Trials for the Athens, 2004 Olympic Games, Barnett was approached by rising Melbourne based swimwear company Way Funky to model their men's label, Funky Trunks, and was the face of the label from 2004 to 2010. This led to other modelling offers and sparked an invitation to compete in the 2006 Manhunt Australia competition in which he won the national title the same year.

Since 2004, Barnett has featured in many Funky Trunks advertising campaigns and commercials, as well as other well established fashion labels and product advertising. These include the Zu Shoes "Presidential Collection" campaign, released in December 2010; Tourism Victoria's Yarra Valley campaign in April 2011; Bosch Automotive in September 2011; The Como Hotel Melbourne 2012; Palace Cinemas 2013, Vic Roads 2014, and Tourism Australia campaign in 2014.

In 2009, Barnett featured on a deck of playing cards wearing Funky Trunks, which were issued as a limited edition promotional offer with Funky Trunks purchases.

He appeared on the CD single covers for "Perfect Strangers" and "Hot Lovin'", written by Drew Heinemann and performed by Daniel McGahan and Natt Dunn in 2011.

In 2017, Barnett's image was used on a Funky Trunks print known as the "Gun Show".

In 2019, an image of Barnett stylishly dressed seated in a private jet was used in an app created by OMG Game Internet Company on Facebook, where users generate a prediction of their "life in the next 5 years", showing images of extravagant lifestyles.

=== Judging ===
Barnett has been a guest judge at several Australian national beauty and modelling contests, including Best Model Australia 2007, Manhunt Australia 2007 and Miss Hawaiian Tropic 2009 national finals.

== Film and television ==
=== 1 vs. 100 ===
Barnett was a contestant on the Network Nine television game show 1 vs. 100, hosted by Eddie McGuire, which aired on 9 July 2007. He was the "1" against the "Mob" of 100 challengers. He was the sixth highest money winner in the history of the 1 vs. 100 (Australian game show), walking away with $108,500.00.

=== Big Brother 08 ===
Barnett appeared in the Australian series of the Network Ten reality television show Big Brother Australia 2008. He entered the Big Brother house, which was located inside the Dreamworld amusement park in Queensland, on Sunday 4 May 2008 under his nickname Barney.

=== Television commercials ===
Barnett has also made appearances in Australian television commercials, which include the Volvo "Attention Seeker" TVC, televised to a global audience until 2012., Target TVC March 2012, Bike Exchange 2012, iiNet 2013, Funky Trunks Underwear 2013, Holden Storm 2015, and 5digitalquotes.com.au 2015.

=== Music videos ===
In December 2010, Barnett featured in the music video "That Season Again" performed Australian country music singer, Rose Carleo, directed by Twinpeak Image. "That Season Again" peaked on the Country Tracks Top 30 national radio chart at #3.

Barnett also co-starred in the 2011 music video, "Say It's Over" performed by Australian pop singer songwriter, Tania Moran, released in April 2011 by Dusk Music Video Production.

=== Radio ===
Prior to, and during, the 2004 Athens Olympic Games, Barnett was a guest speaker on radio station Radio Fremantle 107.9 FM as a swimming expert due to his vast knowledge of the sport and his inside information on several Australian Swimming Team members.

== Other ==
Barnett spent much of his adult life working in the field of cargo shipping and still remains involved. He currently resides in Melbourne, Australia. He is also a member of the North Cottesloe Surf Life Saving Club in Western Australia.
