= Pania Rose =

Australian fashion model (born 1984)

- Born: 16 May 1984 (age 42); Kalamunda, Perth, Western Australia
- Modeling information
- Height: 180 cm (5 ft 11 in)
- Hair color: Brown
- Eye color: Brown

Pania Rose (born 16 May 1984 in Perth) is an Australian fashion model well known for her 2006 Sports Illustrated Swimsuit Edition appearance.

== Biography ==
Rose, of Māori/Dutch descent, was discovered during the Western Australian stage of a national model search run by teen girls' magazine, Girlfriend. She put her drama studies on hold while her fashion career progressed.

She has modeled in advertisements for Armani Exchange, Country Road, Kenneth Cole, Neiman Marcus, Revlon, Victoria's Secret, XOXO, Bonds, Oroton and WATERSUN Swimwear, while also posing for covers for Marie Claire and Spanish Vogue.

Her fashion shows include Rebecca Taylor, Jeremy Scott, and Rock & Republic.
