= Une Piece =

Australian women's swimwear retailer

Une Piece Pty Ltd
- Type: Private
- Industry: Apparel manufacture and retail
- Founded: 2016
- Founder: Carly Brown
- Headquarters: Brisbane, Queensland, Australia
- Area served: Worldwide
- Products: Athletic apparel (swimwear)
- Website: https://www.unepiece.com

Une Piece is an Australian retailer of women's swimwear, founded by Carly Brown in 2016. The brand's signature product is a one-piece swimsuit with long sleeves; the upper half of the suit resembling and functioning as a rashie. The suit provides its wearer with UPF50+ sun protection for their arms and back, and a zippered front offers a selectable amount of protection for the chest. The "Original Sexie Rashie" design attracted favourable review in major fashion publications including Vogue, Elle, Marie Claire, and Vanity Fair, and won Brown second place in the Queensland University of Technology's Bluebox annual innovation challenge for 2017. Brown later named the Huffington Post, London Times, and Vogue reviews as giving her a sense of validation.

The suits are manufactured from a 4½ times chlorine resistant Italian fabric and feature 28 pieces in their construction (compared to four in a typical rashie). This structure is intended to "flatter and conceal", as a reviewer in The Times put it. The design went through eleven iterations before being finalised and is manufactured in a wide range of sizes: (Australian) sizes 6 to 18. The broad range of sizes was a deliberate choice by Brown to make the product as accessible to as many women as practical, stating in an interview "It's not fair just because you aren't a size 8 or 10, you can't get access to beautiful products".

Prior to founding Une Piece, Brown was a marketing manager for The Coca-Cola Company and Revlon in London, and a senior marketing manager for Uber in Australia. The idea for the Une Piece design came to Brown when she was holidaying in Europe. While undertaking market research for the product, she amassed a waiting list of over 500 buyers, convincing her of the product's viability. The initial production run sold out within a week of availability with future buyers facing a wait of over a month for the second run. She left her position at Uber to work full-time on Une Piece in July 2016.

The "Original Sexie Rashie" design was later joined by two variations with back zips in place of the front zip: the "Surfe Sexie Rashie" with a higher neck, and the "Twist Sexie Rashie" with a low-cut neck and twist detailing on the front. Une Piece also manufactures a conventional, halterneck one-piece swimsuit based on their "Twist Sexie Rashie" design.
