= Way Funky =

Swimwear company in Victoria, Australian

Way Funky Company Pty Ltd
- Type: Private
- Industry: Apparel industry
- Founded: 2002
- Founder: Duncan McLean
- Headquarters: Australia
- Area served: Worldwide
- Products: Swimwear; Sportswear
- Website: www.wayfunky.com

Way Funky Company Pty Ltd (or Way Funky) is an Australian swimwear apparel manufacturing company based in Victoria, Australia. It was founded in 2002 by Duncan McLean, and specializes in colorful chlorine resistant sports swimwear. The company also produces competitive swimwear approved by FINA.

Way Funky manages three distinct brands of swimwear: Funkita for ladies, girls and toddlers; Funky Trunks for men, boys and toddlers; and Kiargo, a separate fashion line for women.

== History ==
Funky Trunks was launched in 2002, Funkita in 2004 and Kiargo in 2006.

== In the media ==
Way Funky signed a deal with Australian male model Craig Barnett in 2007 and was one of the first major brands to sign a major deal in March 2010 with an openly gay athlete, namely the Australian Olympic gold medalist diver Matthew Mitcham. Mitcham was announced as the new face of Funky Trunks. He will appear globally on advertising campaigns across Australia, Europe and the United States as the brand rapidly expands into international markets. He is also spokesman and "swimwear ambassador" for the brand.

== See also ==
- List of swimwear brands
