= Duncan McLean (rugby union) =

Scottish international rugby union player (1923–1962)

- Full name: Duncan Ian McLean
- Born: 1 May 1923
- Died: 21 March 1962 (aged 38) Stockport, England
- School: Royal High School, Edinburgh

Rugby union career
- Position: Back-row
International career
Years	Team	Apps	(Points)
1947	Scotland	2	(0)

Duncan Ian McLean (1 May 1923 — 21 March 1962) was a Scottish international rugby union player.

McLean was educated at the Royal High School in Edinburgh and subsequently played for Royal HSFP.

A back-row forward, McLean gained two Scotland caps in the 1947 Five Nations, making his debut against Ireland at Murrayfield. He retained his place for their Calcutta Cup match against England at Twickenham, which he nearly missed after his train journey from Edinburgh to London took 18 1/2 hours on account of heavy snow.

== See also ==
- List of Scotland national rugby union players
