= Zoggs =

Brand of swimwear

- Company type: Private
- Industry: Swimwear, googles
- Founded: Sydney, Australia (1992; 34 years ago)
- Headquarters: Surrey, England
- Area served: Worldwide
- Products: Swimwear
- Website: www.zoggs.com

Zoggs is a brand of swimming goggles, training aids, swimwear and other related products. The company launched in Sydney, Australia in 1992 and was the first brand to offer UV protection and split yoke straps as standard features on all goggles.

== History ==
Zoggs was founded in 1992, and in 1994 Zoggs launched the world's first patented one piece goggle, Phantom, which was shortly followed by the launch of Little Ripper in 1995 which went on to be the No.1 selling junior swimming goggle in Australia and the UK. 1996 saw the introduction of mirrored lenses to Zoggs Phantom goggles. In 1997, Zoggs branched out into swimwear with the launch of Toggs, 26 styles named after Australian beaches, they also went another step further with the introduction of Saibo goggles, a pearlescent soft frame goggle, giving Zoggs another world first.

In 1998, Zoggs bought Polyotter and began to incorporate the Bobin and float suit into its range, making its first steps into the water confidence category, followed in 1999 by Zoggs CV (Clearer Vision) lenses, which claimed to improve clarity and brightness indoors while cutting glare in sunlight. Zoggs continued to develop its goggle range in 2001 launching Super Seal, introducing the first 100% Silicone flexible fit frame. This was shortly followed in 2003 by another world first with the launch of Kids goggles, a range of goggles designed specifically for children aged up to 6 years old. These goggles were made to fit smaller faces and were much more colourful and functional.

2004 saw the launch of CLT Curved Lens Technology™, which claims to give 180 degree peripheral vision and therefore greater visibility whilst swimming. In 2005, Zoggs launched Predator Goggles with Wiro-frame Bio-Integral design technology. This delivered the versatility of a one piece goggle with a frame which offered individualised fit and comfort. 2009 also saw Zoggs become one of the first brands to introduce PVC safe inflatables as standard to their water confidence range. The following year, the Push-pad and Ratchet Quick-fit strap systems were launched. These have advanced strap mechanisms built into the frames claiming to make the goggle straps easier to adjust.

2008 saw the launch of hypo-allergenic Soft-Seal™ gaskets which mould to the contours of the swimmers face for a better fit. In 2009 the company launched their Swimshapes range, a line of swimwear which is claimed to flatter, enhance and support all body shapes. This range includes a "Booty Suit", which has bust support, tummy control and even claims to provide a boost to the wearer's bottom. Zoggs also used their adult Phantom goggle design to create Phantom goggles for both kids and juniors.

In 2010 Zoggs launched their Predator Flex goggles with 4 Flexpoint™ Technology on the nose bridge which is claimed to enhance frame flexibility, giving a customised fit. They also became the first to market with their Positive Drive Fins, a swimming fin designed for use in all four strokes. 2011 saw some great achievements for Zoggs as they introduced their Swimfree™ Floatsuit, a patented technology with inflatable buoyancy, which can be reduced as the child's confidence in the water grows. Zoggs also launched Air Cushion Technology into their frames, which is claimed to give an almost not there feeling to their goggles, with silicone gaskets containing air pockets for a customised fit and no more marking around the eyes from wearing goggles. Zoggs also introduced Polarized lenses to their Predator Flex and Predator frames.

In 2012 Zoggs introduced Easy Inflate Valves to their range of inflatables, which claim to make inflatable products easier and quicker to inflate and deflate. 2013 saw another world first for Zoggs, as they became the first brand to use photo-chromatic lenses in their goggles, a lens that adjusts to changing light conditions, providing clear lenses in low level light and tinted lenses in bright conditions. They also experimented with lenses on junior goggles and added hologram lenses to the range with their Sea Demon goggles. In 2014 they developed their Polarized lenses to create the Predator Flex Polarized Ultra goggle, Italian made polarized lenses designed to repel blue light and are claimed to give even clearer vision whilst swimming outdoors.

In 2015, Zoggs launched Predator Flex Titanium Reactor Goggles, building on the previous features of the Predator and Predator Flex. Titanium Reactor Goggles feature photo-chromatic lenses that react according to light conditions and polarization to reduce glare. Adam Walker, the first Briton to swim the Ocean's Seven - the 7 toughest oceans in the world, wore Predator Flex Titanium Reactor Goggles on his 7th and final swim from Ireland to Scotland a swim that lasted 10 hours 45 minutes.

In 2016, Zoggs continued to introduce new frame technology to their range of goggles, offering Tri Power Vision goggles which feature liquid silicone gaskets, a lightweight contoured frame and optical grade polycarbonate lenses. 2017 saw the introduction of a new frame for their iconic Predator goggles, featuring Ultra-Fit gaskets which are 15% lighter and more streamlined than the previous model.

In 2018, Zoggs Fogbuster Anti-Fog & Lens Cleaner was recalled due to “temporary discomfort and short term eye damage” possibly caused by acetaldehyde and propionaldehyde. Notices on government websites and at retailers were considered by some as inadequate and that Zoggs should have notified all swimming pools in Australia. In 2019, Zoggs apologised to Darren Lydeamore, a Queensland swimmer, who suffered pain and damage to his eyes after applying the recalled anti-fog gel to the inside of his goggles.

In 2020, the sports apparel group Head bought Zoggs.

=== Characters ===
Name	Gender	Color
Miss Zoggy	Female	Blue
Zoggy	Male	Blue
Tommy	Male	Green
Ozzy	Male	Pink
Cedric	Male	Orange

== Curved Lens Technology ==
In 2004, Zoggs announced CLT - Curved Lens Technology, which claims to offer 180° peripheral vision underwater.

== See also ==
- List of swimwear brands
