= Island Company =

Wholesale and retail resort clothing brand

- Industry: Apparel, clothing, fashion, retail
- Founded: 2002
- Founder: Spencer Antle
- Defunct: 2019
- Headquarters: West Palm Beach, Florida
- Area served: U.S.A., Caribbean, Central America, Asia, Europe
- Products: Swimwear, sunglasses, suncare, candles, beach accessories, jewelry & footwear
- Divisions: Island Company Originals, Island Company Retail, Island Company Lifestyle Products, Escape Travel Live, Island Vintage

Island Company was a wholesale and retail resort clothing brand founded in 2002 by Spencer Antle. As of 2019, the company shut down its retail stores due to extensive damage from Hurricane Irma.

The firm had expanded from a small collection of women’s swimwear to products ranging from men’s and women’s travel apparel, a skin care line, sunglasses, and beach and home accessories.

== History ==
When Island Company was started, Antle and his girlfriend drove from store to store selling the line of 13 bikinis from their car. When they separated, Antle kept Island Company and added a men’s line and other new products. The line was soon picked up by destination resort shops in the Ritz Carlton and Four Seasons Hotels, starting a transition for Island Company to become a full lifestyle resort brand, beyond just a bikini line.

In the economic downturn of 2008, the firm opened 5 retail stores in 18 months. However, some of those retail locations have since closed. Since then, the firm was listed in Inc. magazine's Top 5000 fastest growing companies in the U.S.A., nominated from 2010 to 2015.

== Lawsuits ==
=== Kendall and Kylie Jenner, Pac-Sun ===
In October 2014, Island Company filed a lawsuit against Kendall Jenner and Kylie Jenner for trademark infringement against Island Company’s slogan "Quit your job. Buy a ticket. Get a tan. Fall in love. Never return."

The Jenners had created a tee shirt, through their deal with teen surf retailer PacSun, using the phrase "Run away. Fall in love. Never return.” The firm said, the Jenners’ version, “is likely to cause confusion, mistake, and deception among consumers.”

In January 2015, the parties settled with Island Company receiving an undisclosed sum and Pac Sun removing all remaining product from stores.

=== Abercrombie ===
In July 2013, Island Company filed a lawsuit against Abercrombie & Fitch for trademark infringement. It alleged that the retailer used Island Company's trademarked "Quit your job. Buy a ticket. Get a tan. Fall in Love. Never return." mantra.

=== Cotton On ===
In mid-December 2015, Island Company filed suit against Cotton On, for their tee shirt “Quit You’r (sic) Job, Buy a Ticket, Travel the World, Fall in Love, Repeat.” Island Company called Cotton On’s grammatically challenged slogan “confusingly similar” to its catchphrase. Island Company asked a federal judge to order Cotton On to destroy the offending garments.

=== Free People ===
A suit was filed on August 31, 2017, in U.S. District Court by Island Company against Free People. The suit alleged that Island Company’s trademark was infringed on by a similar logo “Buy A Ticket, Tune In, Rock Out, Never Return,” used on some merchandise sold by Free People.

== Locations ==
Island Company had 12 freestanding, branded retail stores; Naples, Florida, Palm Beach, Florida, Cayman Islands, Ritz-Carlton Ft. Lauderdale, Nantucket, Martha’s Vineyard, East Hampton NY, two in Las Vegas at the (Venetian Las Vegas), the Fashion Show Mall, and two in Harbour Island in the Bahamas. In June 2015, it was announced that Island Company would be opening a 4,000 square foot store at the Ritz-Carlton in Ft. Lauderdale, Florida. The firm sold to over 1000 wholesale accounts worldwide. Its products were distributed in the North America, South America, the Caribbean, and Europe. In July 2019, all stores were forced to close.

== Closure ==
Island Company closed in July 2019 due to destruction from Hurricane Irma.

== See also ==
- List of swimwear brands
