= Deus Ex Machina (company) =

Australian clothing company

- Industry: Retail
- Founded: 2006; 20 years ago
- Founders: Dare Jennings
- Headquarters: Camperdown, New South Wales, Australia
- Area served: Worldwide
- Key people: Federico Minoli (CEO and coowner)
- Products: surf, snow and streetwear clothing
- Website: deuscustoms.com

Deus Ex Machina is designer of surf, snow, and street clothing.

The company was founded in Sydney in 2006. In 2017, a controlling stake of 60% of the company was sold to a cabal of fashion businessmen primarily based in Milan which included Federico Minoli, who became CEO, Filippo Bassoli, Antonio Belloni the group managing director of LVMH, Ottavio Missoni, Santiago Fallonier, and Masaki Kato from Japan. The company expanded to stores in Bali, Japan, Los Angeles, and Milan.

Breitling SA teamed up with Deus Ex Machina to make a watch in 2021.

== See also ==
- List of motorcycle manufacturers
- List of sporting goods manufacturers
- List of swimwear brands
