= Mambo Graphics =

Australian clothing company

Mambo
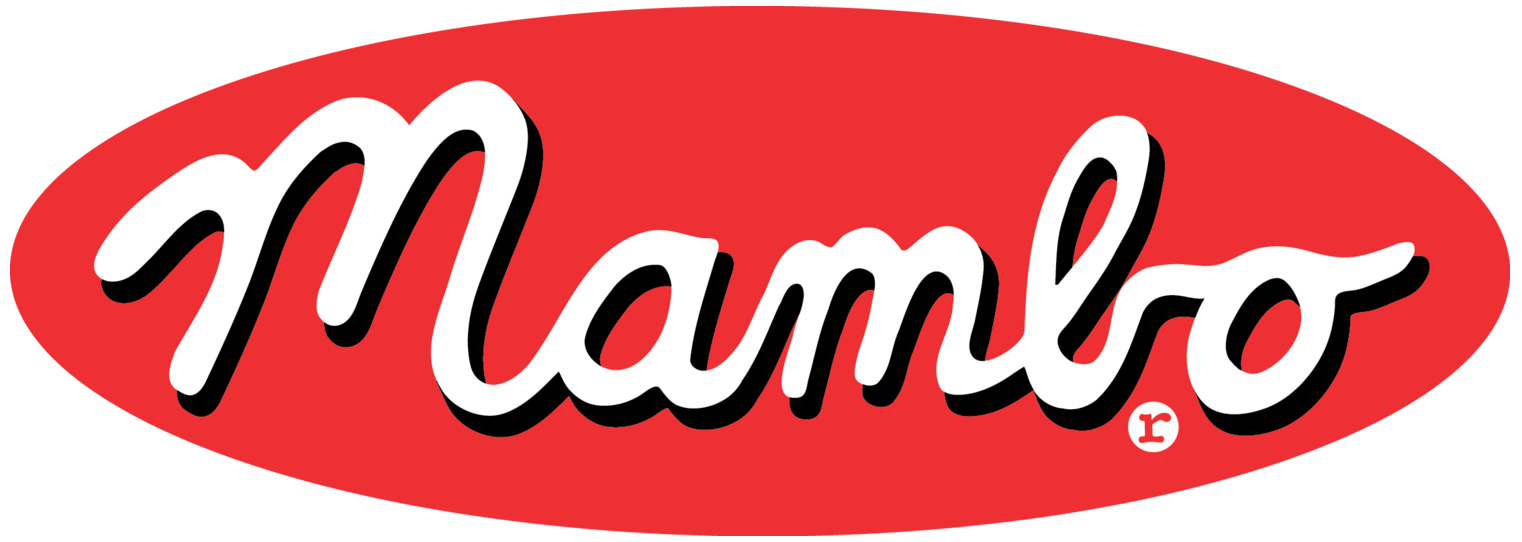
- Company type: Subsidiary
- Industry: Retail, textile
- Founded: 1984; 42 years ago
- Founders: Dare Jennings
- Headquarters: Alexandria, New South Wales, Australia
- Area served: Worldwide
- Products: Surfwear • Streetwear
- Parent: Caprice Australia
- Website: mambo.cc

Mambo Graphics (also, 100% Mambo; and marketed as Mambo) is an Australian clothing brand specialises in swimwear, wetsuits, casual wear apparel and surfing accessories. Mambo was launched in 1984 by Australian entrepreneur and founder of Phantom Records, Dare Jennings along with his business partner, Andrew Rich. The headquarters are located in Alexandria, Sydney.

Mambo is available in Australia and New Zealand. In 2011, the retail company expanded its market into the United States and Canada, later establishing stores across the United Kingdom. The first pair of board shorts were created by British fashion designer, Paul Smith. Peter Pilotto and other designers inspired the female wetsuits.

On 6 January 2015, Mambo was acquired by the American brand management and production company, Saban Brands. Four years later, Mambo returned to Australian ownership when it was acquired by Caprice Australia in July 2019.

== History ==
=== Early days ===
In the early 1970s, Dare Jennings owned a large and successful screen printing business, Phantom Textile Printers, producing t-shirt and fabric prints for a variety of commercial clients. He also owned an independent record label, Phantom Records. Mambo began life as an "after-hours" project in the Phantom art room. The graphics were initially created by in-house artists such as musician Jodi Phillis, and by freelance artist, Richard Allan whose first t-shirt graphics, 'Real Wrestlers, Real Wrestling' and 'Call Of The Wild (Farting Dog)' were the best-sellers.

'100% Mambo' clothing was often available in surf / skate shops in the mid- to late 1980s in the UK. As skateboarders wore much surfer-inspired clothing, Mambo board shorts in loud / Hawaiian patterns were worn by skaters. Other similar surf / skate brands around at the time were Stüssy, Life's A Beach and Vision Street Wear. As this was long before skate culture became mainstream (e.g. skate shops often only sold Vans, Vision or Converse shoes), these were usually niche products.

Allan's arrival at Mambo was followed by other Australian and overseas artists, including Reg Mombassa, Robert Williams (US) and Ben Frost.

=== Development ===
A Mambo shirt logo

In 1994, Mambo released its first "Loud Shirt", a design influenced by the traditional Hawaiian Aloha shirt. The shirt was named "Blue Hawaii" by Martin Plaza, a bandmate of Reg Mombassa, and quickly became one of the company's best-selling products, establishing the signature Mambo "Loud Shirt" aesthetic. The following year, Mambo unveiled its first retail outlet, the "Mambo Friendship Store", in Paddington, Sydney. The company subsequently expanded its retail presence, opening more stores across Australia and internationally in the UK, Europe, Asia, and New Zealand. By 2001, Mambo had established 25 independent retail stores worldwide.

In 2000 Mambo received an invitation from the Australian Wool Board to design the athlete's uniform for the opening ceremony of the 2000 Summer Olympics in Sydney. After the Summer Olympic Games, Jennings was approached by Gazal Corporation to buy the brand. Jennings sold the company in March of that year and took over the role of creative director. Jennings left the company in 2002 and later went on to create the surf and moto-inspired brand Deus Ex Machina.

In 2006, Principle (an Australian research company) named Mambo "Australia's sixth-most-authentic brand" alongside Bonds, Speedo, R. M. Williams and Billabong. In 2008 Mambo was sold to The Nervous Investor Group, an Australian-based consortium headed by Angus Kingsmill and based in the Sydney beachside suburb of Manly. In 2015 Mambo was sold to US clothing group Saban Brands. In 2012, Mambo entered into partnerships with key players in the US and Brazil with plans to introduce the brand on a large scale in each country. In July 2019, Mambo was acquired by 60-year-old family-run brand Caprice Australia, bringing ownership of the Mambo brand to Australia.

== See also ==
- List of swimwear brands
- List of Australian bicycle brands and manufacturers
