= Trade Secret (Australian company) =

Australian discount store chain

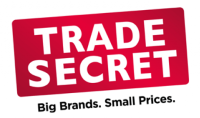
- Type: Subsidiary
- Industry: Retail
- Founded: 1992; 34 years ago
- Defunct: 2017; 9 years ago
- Fate: All stores converted to the T.K. Maxx banner
- Headquarters: Australia
- Number of locations: 35 (Apr 2017)
- Products: apparel, footwear, accessories, and home fashions
- Parent: TJX (2015–present)
- Website: tradesecret.com.au

Trade Secret was a chain of clothing, accessories and home furnishing stores operated by TJX and had 35 stores across Australia by April 2017. The stores were located in Sydney, Melbourne, Brisbane, Canberra, Newcastle, Wollongong, Cairns, Townsville, Toowoomba, Albury, the Sunshine Coast and the Gold Coast. On 3 February 2017, they announced on their website that they would soon be rebranding all existing locations as T.K. Maxx and opening new locations across the east coast. As of 20 April 2017 the stores were operating as T.K. Maxx.

TJX acquired Trade Secret for AUD$80 million from Gazal Corporation in 2015.

== Home Secret ==
Parent company TJX also operates Home Secret, a 'sister' store of Trade Secret, which carries home furnishings. As of January 2016, there is one location in Kawana, Queensland.
