= XTG Extreme Game =

Spanish swimwear and underwear manufacturer

XTG Extreme Game - International
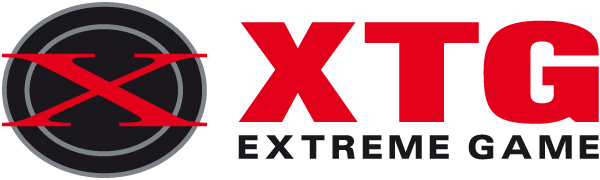
- Type: Private
- Industry: Fashion
- Founded: 1987
- Founder: Luis Mentado Medina
- Headquarters: Las Palmas de Gran Canaria, Spain
- Area served: Worldwide
- Products: Men's and Women's swimwear, underwear, and clothing
- Website: www.xtg.es

XTG Extreme Game is a Spanish men's and women's swimwear and underwear manufacturer from Gran Canaria, one of the Canary Islands. XTG also expanded its product line to other clothing including leisurewear, sportswear and accessories.

== History ==
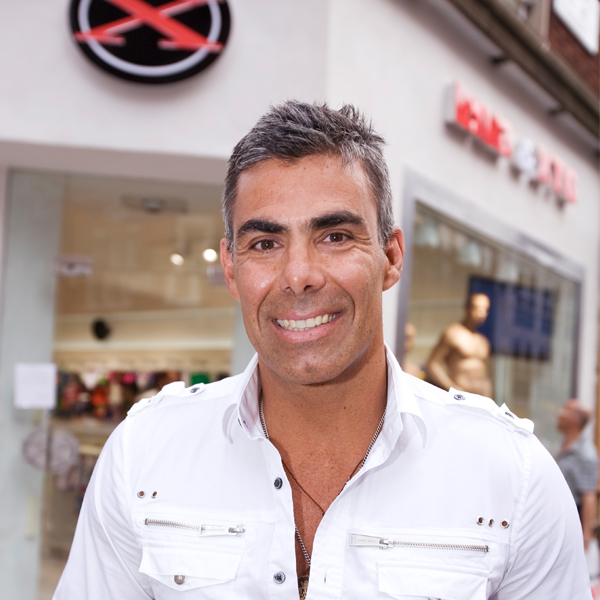
Luis Mentado, founder of XTG Extreme Game

In 1987, director Luis Mentado Medina and his partner Lenita Burman started XTG Extreme Game designing and producing wetsuits. In the late 80's, the raising in the price of the high quality Japanese neoprene forced him out of business. After that he decided to launch a line of men's swimwear, what became the actual XTG Extreme Game brand. It became the absolute leader in its sector in the Canary Islands and very popular in mainland Spain. It also has good sales in the rest of Europe.

In 2005 XTG presented their first XTG underwear collection, becoming the most sold and well known product from XTG internationally. After this success they launched a line of lingerie for the female market.

Recently, the company launched a sports wear collection, XTG GYM, and a kid's line, XTG Kid's Collection.

With over 50 employees, XTG is a global enterprise manufacturing over 100 different products.

== Marketing ==
XTG retails in Spanish department stores like El Corte Inglés and internationally in Selfridges, Pyrénées Department Stores, Galeries Lafayette, Priape and Hankyu Department Store.

Their company online shop has experienced a sustained growth in sales around the world. The brand also has small boutiques in various cities around the world.

XTG Extreme Game promotes their products in magazines and signs in different countries and in traditional and not traditional venues on the internet, such as blogs and social networking sites Facebook and Twitter.

== Products ==
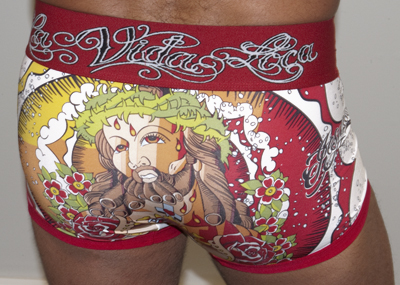
XTG "Religious" 'boxer'

All XTG products are manufactured in Gran Canaria and China with the business run completely out of the company's headquarters in Gran Canaria. The fabrics are bought from factories in Barcelona.

For the spring-summer 2011 season, XTG offers an "American" style in underwear and home-wear, using red, white, blue and black colours.

The XTG design style is colourful, complex and daring, with some of the recurrent themes being sex, popular characters and mythology. XTG is part of the Burmen group, along with the Lenita brand.

== Controversy ==
In 2010, the "Religious" briefs & boxers, depicting Jesus Christ on the back, was retired from department stores after complaints from Christian groups that intended to sue the company.

== See also ==
- Speedo (suit style)
