= The Voice (Australian TV series) season 15 =

2026 season of television series

The Voice
- Season 15
- Promotional poster featuring coaches (clockwise from left) Melanie C, Marx, Keating, Miller-Heidke, and Tones and I
- Hosted by: Sonia Kruger
- Coaches: Ronan Keating; Melanie C; Kate Miller-Heidke; Richard Marx; Tones and I (second chance)
- Winner: Yung Milla
- Winning coach: Melanie C
- Runners-up: Daisha Auda, Tommy Novak, and The 60 Four

Release
- Original network: Seven Network
- Original release: 2 August – 27 September 2026

Season chronology
- ← Previous; Season 14

The fifteenth season of The Voice Australia began airing on 2 August 2026. On 24 October 2025, it was revealed that the four coaches from last season; Ronan Keating, Melanie C, Kate Miller-Heidke and Richard Marx; as well as host Sonia Kruger would return. On 8 June 2026, it was announced that Tones and I would join the panel as a fifth coach this season, marking the first instance of five coaches in the history of The Voice Australia.

Similar to the previous five seasons, the finale was pre-recorded and the winner was determined by a viewer poll. Yung Milla from Team Melanie C was declared the winner of the season, marking Melanie C's first win as a coach on the Australian version of The Voice, and second win globally (her first win occurred on the fifth season of The Voice Kids UK). Additionally, Milla became the first rapper in The Voice Australia history to win the show, as well as the second rapper to win a regular season of The Voice globally (after Jose Carlos on the fifteenth season of The Voice of Finland). He was also the first Indigenous Australian artist to win the show.

== Overview ==
Coaches and host of season 15

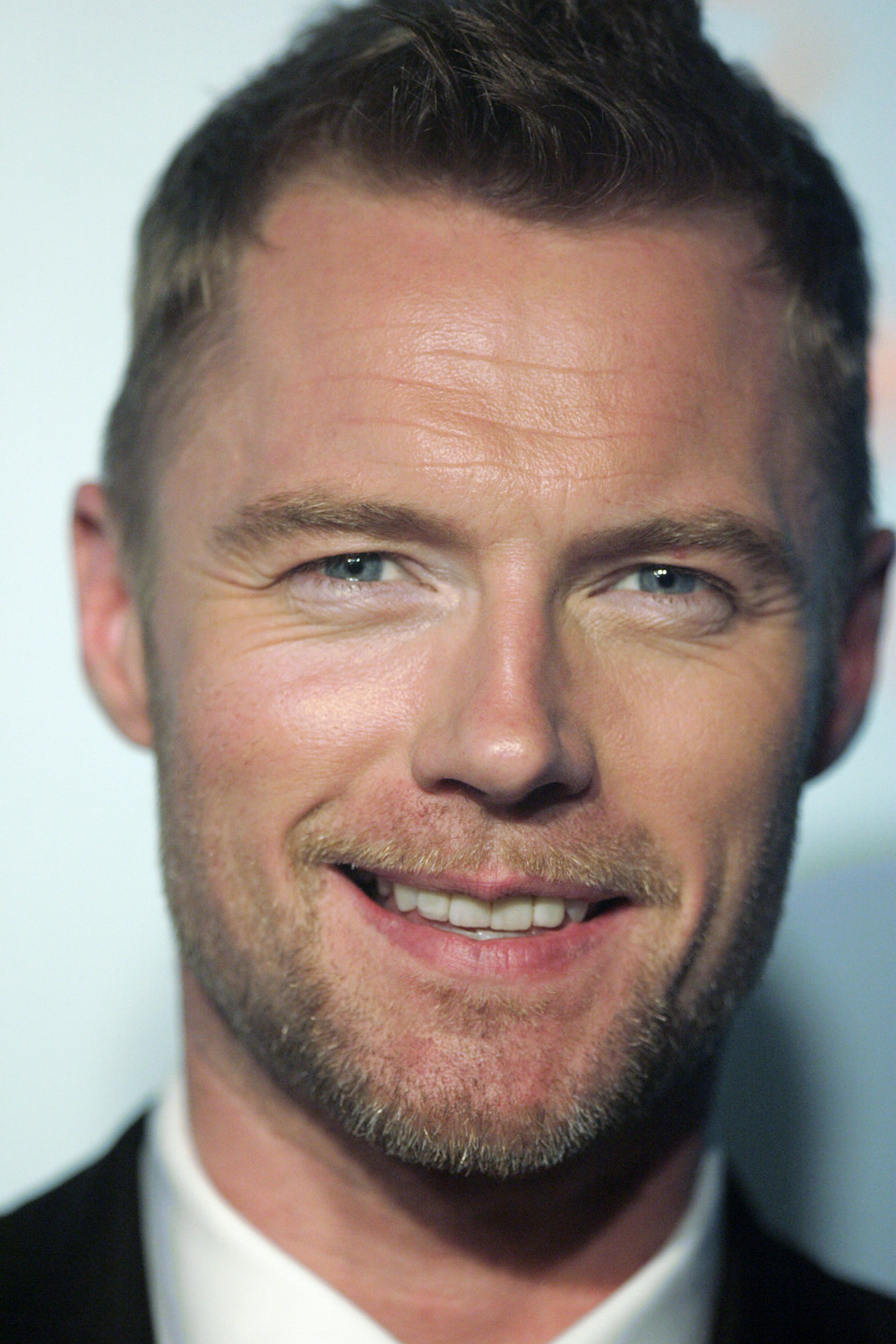
Ronan Keating

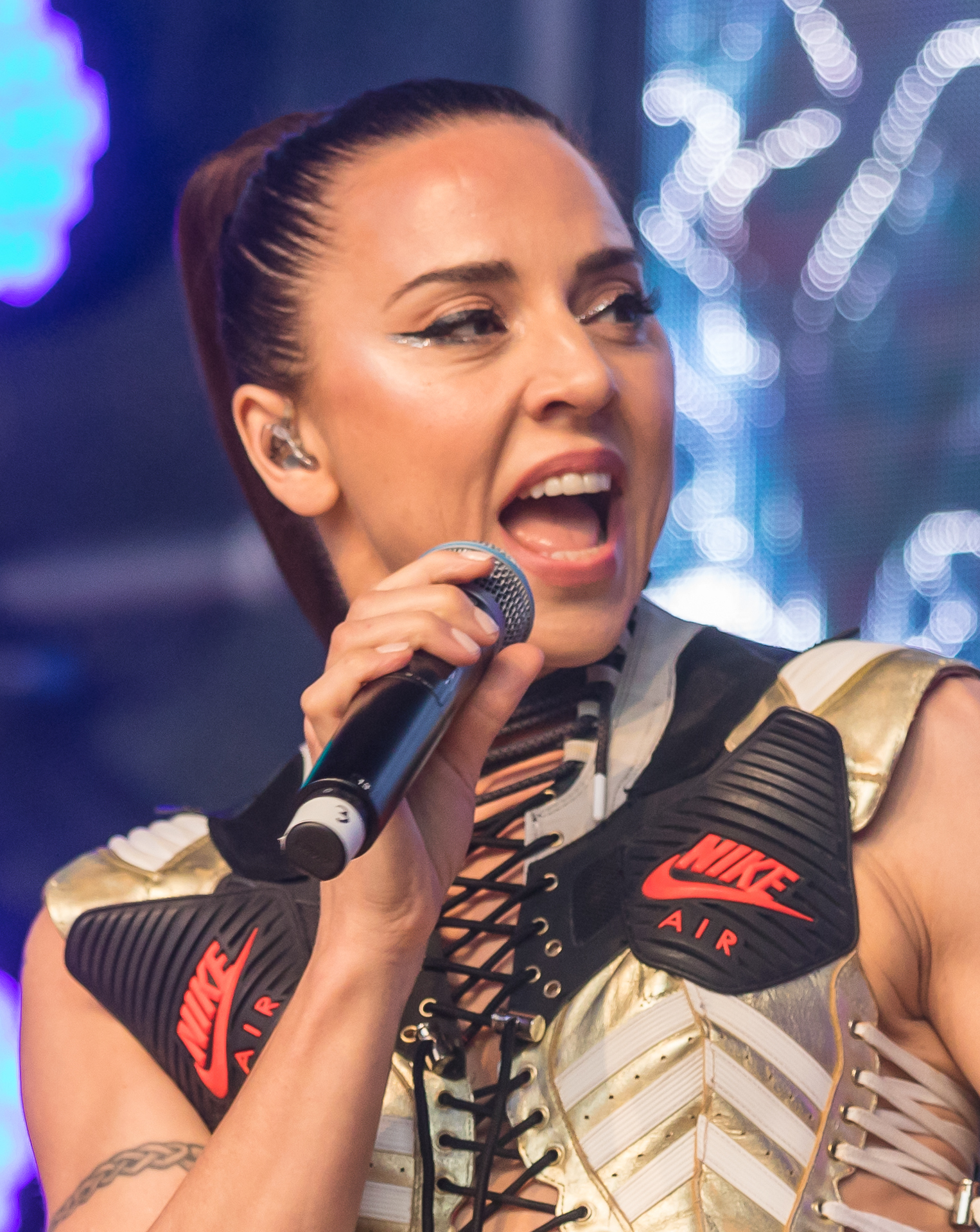
Melanie C

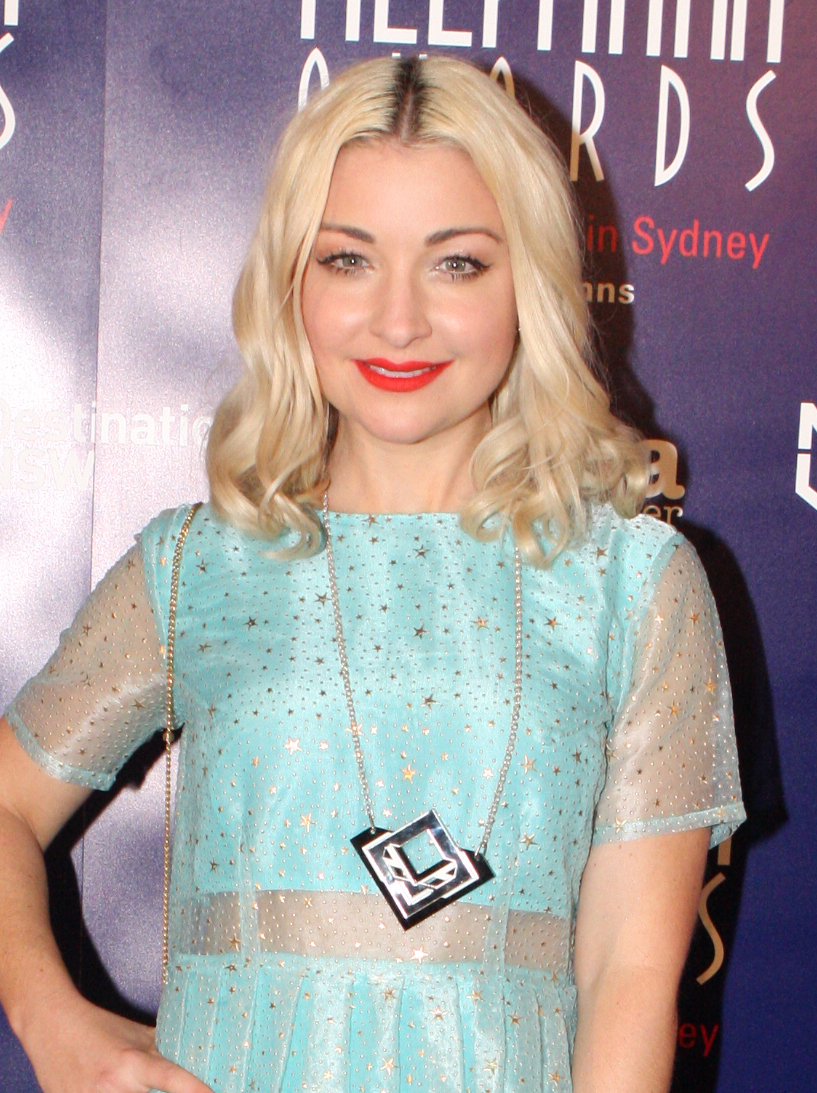
Kate Miller-Heidke

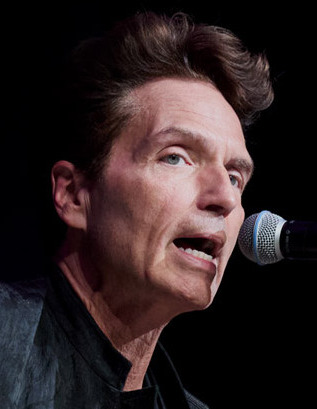
Richard Marx

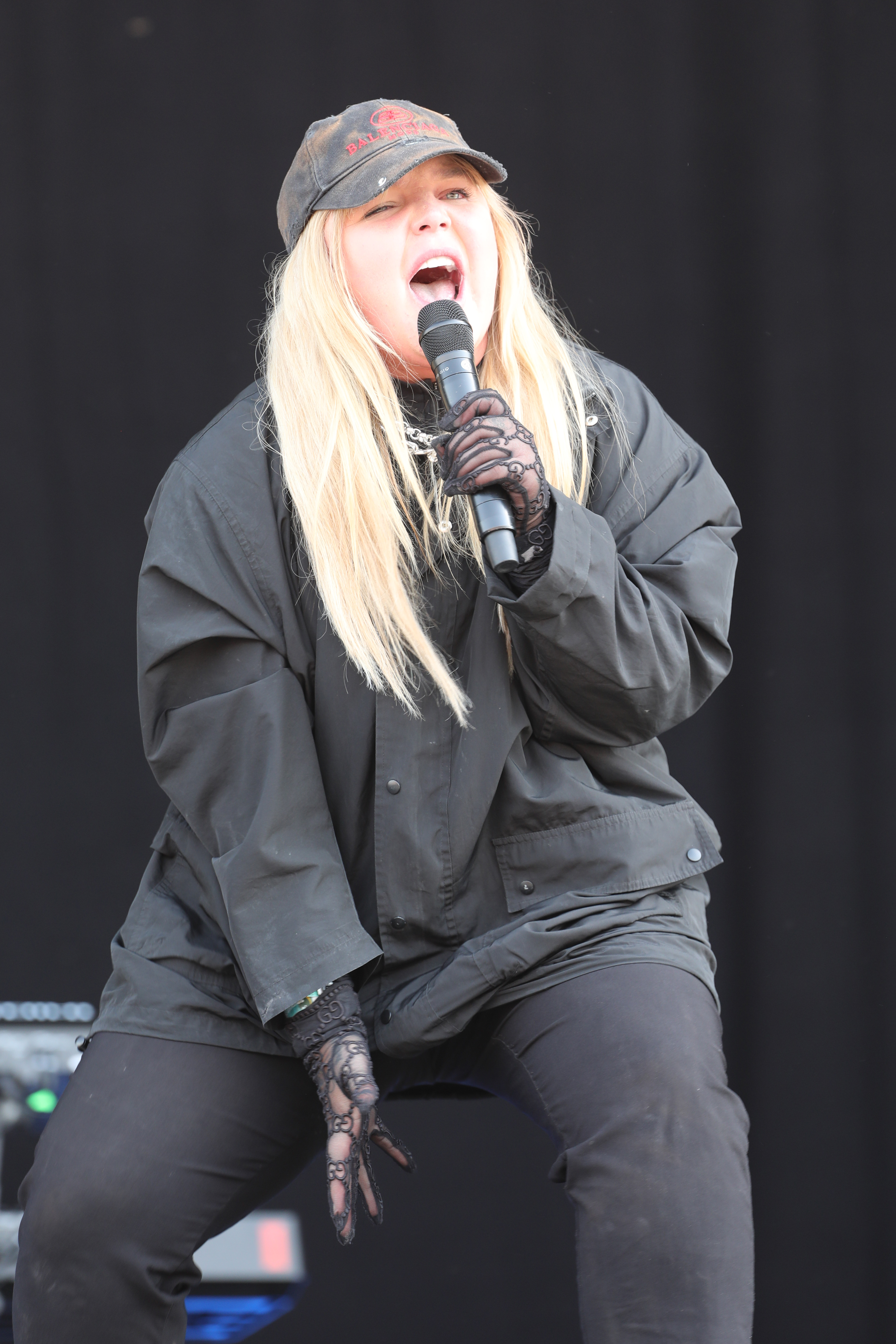
Tones and I (second chance)

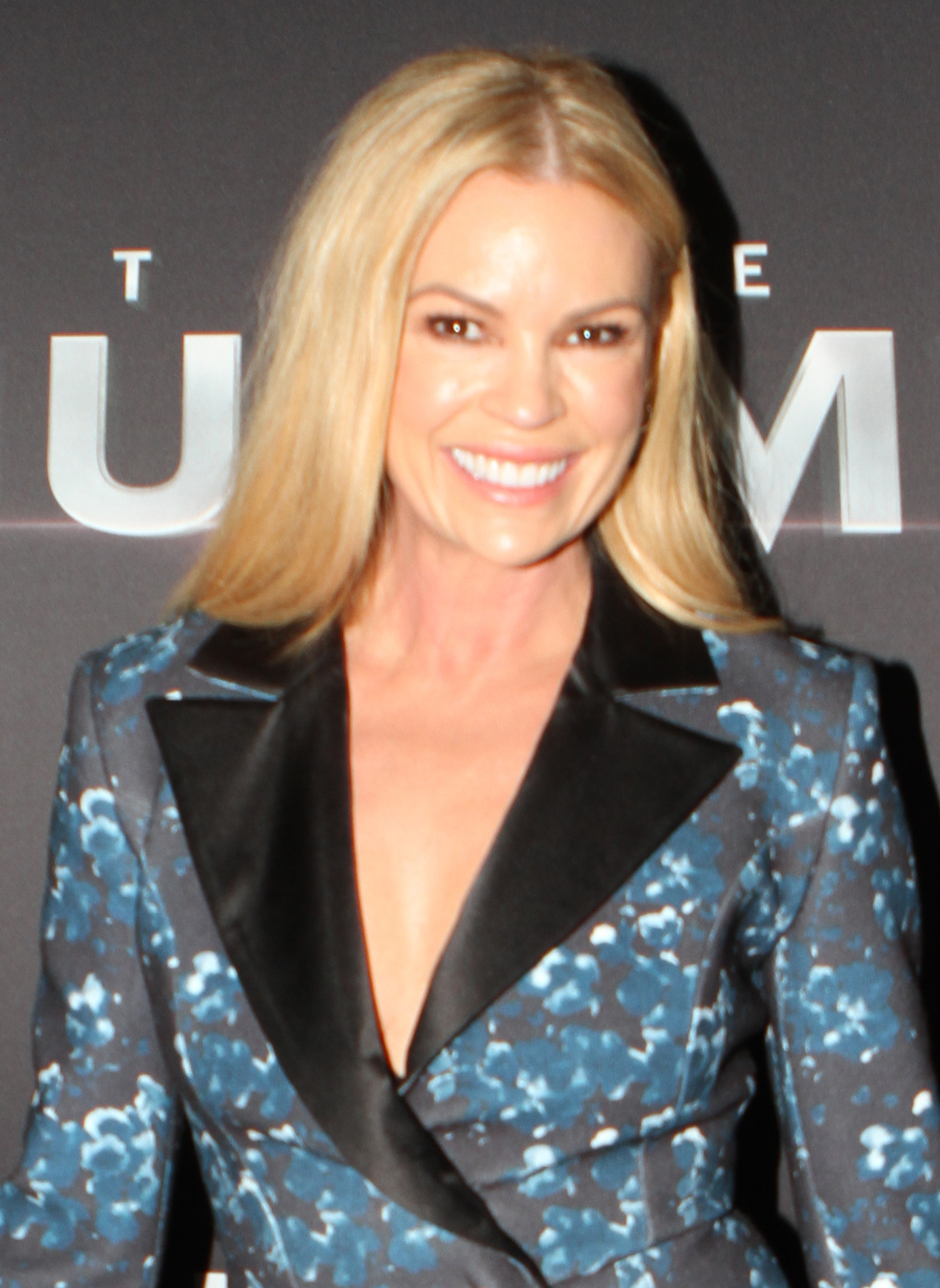
Sonia Kruger (host)

=== Coaches and host ===
In October 2025, it was announced that Kate Miller-Heidke, Melanie C, Ronan Keating, and Richard Marx would return to the show for their third, second, third, and second seasons, respectively, while Sonia Kruger returned for her tenth season. This marked the third time that all coaches returned, and the second time that both the coaches and host returned together.

=== Additions and changes ===
On 8 June 2026, it was announced that Tones and I would debut as a fifth coach this season, marking the first time on the Australian version of the show to feature five coaches. She serves as a "Second chance" coach giving losing artists in the blind auditions another chance to compete in the competition.

The ultimate block and the battles were removed, while The Showdowns were replaced with the quarterfinals.

== Teams ==
Colour key

- Winner
- Runner-up
- 3rd place
- 4th place
- Eliminated in the Semifinals
- Eliminated in the Quarterfinals
- Stolen in the Knockouts
- Eliminated in the Knockouts
- Joined another team
- Eliminated after Second Chance

Season fifteen coaching teams
Coach	Top 42 Artists			
Ronan Keating				
Ronan Keating	The 60 Four	Leyla Sabo	Jamie Koul	Phoebe Rose
Ronan Keating	~~Daisha Auda~~	Sam Cliffe	Georgia Dabbous	Renee Naccari
Ronan Keating	Brooklyn Sauer	Findlay Webb	Jerikye Williams	
Melanie C				
Melanie C	Yung Milla	Taylor Beadle-Williams	Jack Hughes	Cleo Paladino
Melanie C	~~The 60 Four~~	Litia Keni	Charlotte MacPhail	Edde Masson
Melanie C	Josh McCauley	Enza Russo	Moniquewa Williams	
Kate Miller-Heidke				
Kate Miller-Heidke	Daisha Auda	Charlotte June	Bertie Anderson	Victoria Knight
Kate Miller-Heidke	~~Taylor Beadle-Williams~~	~~Wave Raiders~~	Madeline Beckett	Cris J
Kate Miller-Heidke	Lachlann Lawton	Fox Stapleton	Carla Venkataya	
Richard Marx				
Richard Marx	Tommy Novak	Tika Cetinich	Wave Raiders	Dicko
Richard Marx	Cherry Green	Jeramie Heitmann	Jessica McPherson-Riley	Saem Millward
Richard Marx	Liam O'Neill	Benny D Williams		
Tones and I				
Tones and I	~~Georgia Dabbous~~	~~Dicko~~	~~Cris J~~	~~Litia Keni~~
Tones and I	~~Jamie Koul~~	~~Carla Venkataya~~	~~Moniquewa Williams~~	Megan Donnelly
Tones and I	Mikayla Durrant	Red Roy		
Note: Italicised names are artists stolen from another team during the Knockouts (names struck through within former teams). Bold names are successful second chance artists (names struck through within former teams).

== Blind auditions ==
The blind auditions aired from 2 to 31 August. In the blind auditions, the coaches complete their teams with 8 artists each. The regular block returned from last season, with each coach receiving two blocks to block another coach from getting an artist; the ultimate block did not return. The coach who is blocked is null and invalid to pitch for the artist. Like the previous season, a coach can block at any time, even during their pitch, as long as the coach turned their chair.

For the first time in the show's history, eliminated artists had the chance to be saved by the fifth coach, Tones and I. She then mentored them on Team Tones. After each coach had 8 artists on their team, the saved artists were sent back into the blind auditions for a second chance, where coaches could fill their teams with as many additional artists as they wanted. Artists that did not receive a chair turn did not have a conversation with the coaches.

This season makes history as having the lowest amount of one chair turns worldwide in a single season, with only 1/39 being a one chair turn: Enza Russo on Melanie C's team.

Blind auditions colour key
✔	Coach hit the "I WANT YOU" button
	Artist joined this coach's team
	Artist eliminated with no coach pressing "I WANT YOU" button
	Artist was eliminated, but got a second chance to be mentored by Tones and I
✘	Coach pressed "I WANT YOU" button, but was blocked by another coach from getting the artist
	Blocked by Ronan; Blocked by Melanie C; Blocked by Kate; Blocked by Richard

Blind auditions result
Episode	Order	Artist	Age	Song	Coach's and artist's choices			
Episode	Order	Artist	Age	Song	Ronan	Melanie C	Kate	Richard
Episode 1 (Sunday, 2 August)	1	Daisha Auda	15	"Cuz I Love You"	✔	✔	✔	✔
Episode 1 (Sunday, 2 August)	2	Red Roy	26	"APT."	—	—	—	—
Episode 1 (Sunday, 2 August)	3	Phoebe Rose	17	"Fields of Gold"	✔	✔	✔	—
Episode 1 (Sunday, 2 August)	4	Steffi Skidmore	33	"Man! I Feel Like a Woman!"	—	—	—	—
Episode 1 (Sunday, 2 August)	5	Tommy Novak	36	"Landslide"	✔	✔	✔	✔
Episode 1 (Sunday, 2 August)	6	Josh McCauley	27	"River"	✘	✔	✔	✘
Episode 2 (Monday, 3 August)	1	Taylor Beadle-Williams	37	"Where Is My Husband!"	✔	✔	✔	✔
Episode 2 (Monday, 3 August)	2	Jack Hughes	29	"Wanted Dead or Alive"	—	✔	✔	—
Episode 2 (Monday, 3 August)	3	Michele Alan	57	"Flashdance... What a Feeling"	—	—	—	—
Episode 2 (Monday, 3 August)	4	Jamie Koul^{1}	19	"Jealous"	—	—	—	—
Episode 2 (Monday, 3 August)	5	Charlotte June	22	"This Woman's Work"	✔	✔	✔	✔
Episode 3 (Tuesday, 4 August)	1	Sam Cliffe	27	"Ordinary"	✔	✔	✔	✔
Episode 3 (Tuesday, 4 August)	2	Tika Cetinich	35	"Separate Ways"	✔	✔	✔	✔
Episode 3 (Tuesday, 4 August)	3	Matilda Maerz	20	"Bang Bang"	—	—	—	—
Episode 3 (Tuesday, 4 August)	4	Liam O'Neill	23	"You Found Me"	✔	—	—	✔
Episode 3 (Tuesday, 4 August)	5	Litia Keni	18	"Listen"	—	—	—	—
Episode 4 (Monday, 10 August)	1	The 60 Four	26	"You Make Me Feel Like Dancing"	✘	✔	✔	✔
Episode 4 (Monday, 10 August)	2	Dicko	47	"Grandpa (Tell Me 'Bout the Good Old Days)"	—	—	—	—
Episode 4 (Monday, 10 August)	3	Victoria Knight	21	"My Immortal"	—	✔	✔	—
Episode 4 (Monday, 10 August)	4	Benny D Williams	52	"Proud Mary" / "Bust a Move" / "Jump"	✔	✔	✔	✔
Episode 4 (Monday, 10 August)	5	Natalie Carboni	42	"You Oughta Know"	—	—	—	—
Episode 4 (Monday, 10 August)	6	Leyla Sabo	12	"Alive"	✔	✔	✔	✘
Episode 5 (Tuesday, 11 August)	1	Charlotte MacPhail	16	"Where Have You Been"	✔	✔	✔	✔
Episode 5 (Tuesday, 11 August)	2	Tomi Gray	36	"Dumb Things"	—	—	—	—
Episode 5 (Tuesday, 11 August)	3	Lachlann Lawton	32	"Largo al factotum"	✔	✔	✔	✔
Episode 5 (Tuesday, 11 August)	4	Georgia Dabbous	26	"The Hardest Part"	—	—	—	—
Episode 5 (Tuesday, 11 August)	5	Jessica McPherson-Riley	41	"The Day You Went Away"	✔	✔	✔	✔
Episode 6 (Monday, 17 August)	1	Cleo Paladino	26	"The Voice Within"	✔	✔	✔	—
Episode 6 (Monday, 17 August)	2	Findlay Webb	23	"Survive"	✔	—	—	✔
Episode 6 (Monday, 17 August)	3	DOLLIE	31	"Break Free"	—	—	—	—
Episode 6 (Monday, 17 August)	4	Cris J	25	"Ocean Drive"	—	—	—	—
Episode 6 (Monday, 17 August)	5	Jeramie Heitmann	26	"Because You Loved Me"	✔	✔	✔	✔
Episode 7 (Tuesday, 18 August)
Episode 7 (Tuesday, 18 August)	1	Jess Kelly	38	"When the War Is Over"	—	—	—	—
Episode 7 (Tuesday, 18 August)	2	Cherry Green	24	"Everybody Needs Somebody to Love"	✔	✔	✔	✔
Episode 7 (Tuesday, 18 August)	3	Renee Naccari	24	"Abracadabra"	✔	—	✔	✔
Episode 7 (Tuesday, 18 August)	4	Fox Stapleton	18	"Man I Need"	—	—	✔	✔
Episode 7 (Tuesday, 18 August)	5	Mikayla Durrant	20	"Silver Springs"	—	—	—	—
Episode 7 (Tuesday, 18 August)	6	Yung Milla	22	"All My Life"	✔	✔	✔	✘
Episode 8 (Monday, 24 August)	1	Wave Raiders	13-15	"Don't Wanna Be Late" (original song)	—	✔	✔	—
Episode 8 (Monday, 24 August)	2	Claire Smith	61	"Whole Lotta Love"	—	—	—	—
Episode 8 (Monday, 24 August)	3	Moniquewa Williams	33	"Wannabe"	—	—	—	—
Episode 8 (Monday, 24 August)	4	Jerikye Williams	23	"Johnny B. Goode"	✔	—	✔	—
Episode 8 (Monday, 24 August)	5	Edde Masson	32	"I Turn to You"	✔	✔	✔	✔
Episode 9 (Tuesday, 25 August)	1	Bertie Anderson^{2}	37	"Caught Up"	✔	✘	✔	—
Episode 9 (Tuesday, 25 August)	2	Megan Donnelly	29	"Light On"	—	—	—	—
Episode 9 (Tuesday, 25 August)	3	Madeline Beckett	35	"Piece of My Heart"	✔	✔	✔	—
Episode 9 (Tuesday, 25 August)	4	Brock Edwards	30	"Wagon Wheel"	—	—	Team Full	—
Episode 9 (Tuesday, 25 August)	5	Brooklyn Sauer	15	"Always Remember Us This Way"	✔	—	Team Full	✘
Episode 9 (Tuesday, 25 August)	6	Carla Venkataya	18	"The Winner Takes It All"	Team Full	—	Team Full	—
Episode 10 (Sunday, 30 August)	1	Saem Millward	19	"New York, New York"	Team Full	✔	Team Full	✔
Episode 10 (Sunday, 30 August)	2	Enza Russo	35	"What Was I Made For?"	Team Full	✔	Team Full	Team Full

^1 Jamie Koul is the brother of previous contestant Zoe Koul who auditioned in season 11 and was eliminated in the Callbacks.
^2 Bertie Anderson previously auditioned in the eighth season but failed to manage a chair turn.

=== Second Chance Artists ===
In this round, after the coaches have filled their teams with eight artists, the artists saved and coached by Tones and I participate in a second blind audition for a chance to continue in the competition.

The four coaches may select additional artists from this round, with no limit on the number of artists they can add to their teams. This time, artists that receive no turns, will be able to have a conversation with the coaches.

With this, this season is the third in which the teams are uneven, following seasons 9 and 10.

Second Chances result
Episode	Order	Artist	Age	Song	Coach's and artist's choices			
Episode	Order	Artist	Age	Song	Ronan	Melanie C	Kate	Richard
Episode 10 (Sunday, 30 August)	1	Litia Keni	18	"Listen"	✔	✔	✔	—
Episode 10 (Sunday, 30 August)	2	Red Roy	26	"Closer"	—	—	—	—
Episode 10 (Sunday, 30 August)	3	Carla Venkataya	18	"The Wizard and I"	—	✔	✔	—
Episode 10 (Sunday, 30 August)	4	Georgia Dabbous	26	"Bust Your Windows"	✔	✔	✔	✔
Episode 11 (Monday, 31 August)	1	Jamie Koul	19	"Back to Friends"	✔	✔	✔	✔
Episode 11 (Monday, 31 August)	2	Moniquewa Williams	33	"Hit 'Em Up Style (Oops!)"	✔	✔	—	—
Episode 11 (Monday, 31 August)	3	Mikayla Durrant	20	"Have You Ever Seen the Rain"^{3}	—	—	—	—
Episode 11 (Monday, 31 August)	4	Cris J	25	"Delete"	✔	✔	✔	—
Episode 11 (Monday, 31 August)	5	Megan Donnelly	29	"It Must Have Been Love"	—	—	—	—
Episode 11 (Monday, 31 August)	6	Dicko	47	"Nose on the Grindstone"	✘	✔	✔	✔

^3 Tones originally planned for Mikayla Durrant to sing "Scar". Durrant vocalised that she did not feel like she connected with the song, and requested to sing a different song.

== Knockouts ==
The knockouts aired on 6 and 7 September. In this round, each coach groups their artists into groups of three or four, with each group competing for a place in the quarterfinals. Each coach can advance only three artists to the quarterfinals.

Each coach is also given one steal, which can be used on a losing artist on an opposing team. If multiple coaches use their steal on the same artist, the artist is given the opportunity to choose which coach to join after each coach has pitched to them. Each coach is limited to one steal throughout the round.

Knockouts colour key
Artist won the Knockout and advanced to the Quarterfinals
Artist lost the Knockout, but was stolen by another coach, and, advanced to the Quarterfinals
Artist lost the Knockout and was eliminated

Knockouts results
Episode	Order	Coach	Song	Winner	Losers	Songs	'Save' result			
Episode	Order	Coach	Song	Winner	Losers	Songs	Ronan	Melanie C	Kate	Richard
Episode 12 (Sunday, 6 September)	1	Kate	"Frozen"	Victoria Knight	Taylor Beadle-Williams	"Juice"	✔	✔	—	✔
Episode 12 (Sunday, 6 September)	1	Kate	"Frozen"	Victoria Knight	Lachlann Lawton	"I Wanna Dance with Somebody (Who Loves Me)"	—	Team full	—	—
Episode 12 (Sunday, 6 September)	2	Ronan	"You Stole the Show"	Leyla Sabo	Georgia Dabbous	"Back to Black"	—	Team full	—	—
Episode 12 (Sunday, 6 September)	2	Ronan	"You Stole the Show"	Leyla Sabo	Renee Naccari	"Midnight Sun"	—	Team full	—	—
Episode 12 (Sunday, 6 September)	3	Richard	"Without Me"	Tika Cetinich	Benny D Williams	"Hallelujah"	—	Team full	—	—
Episode 12 (Sunday, 6 September)	3	Richard	"Without Me"	Tika Cetinich	Jeramie Heitmann	"I'm With You"	—	Team full	—	—
Episode 12 (Sunday, 6 September)	4	Ronan	"Somebody That I Used to Know"	Jamie Koul	Findlay Webb	"Bad Habits"	—	Team full	—	—
Episode 12 (Sunday, 6 September)	4	Ronan	"Somebody That I Used to Know"	Jamie Koul	Jerikye Williams	"Until I Found You"	—	Team full	—	—
Episode 12 (Sunday, 6 September)	4	Ronan	"Somebody That I Used to Know"	Jamie Koul	Sam Cliffe	"Say You Won't Let Go"	—	Team full	—	—
Episode 12 (Sunday, 6 September)	5	Richard	"All by Myself"	Tommy Novak	Liam O'Neill	"Long Hot Summer"	—	Team full	—	—
Episode 12 (Sunday, 6 September)	5	Richard	"All by Myself"	Tommy Novak	Jessica McPherson-Riley	"Love Me like You Do"	—	Team full	—	—
Episode 12 (Sunday, 6 September)	6	Melanie C	"God Is a Woman"	Cleo Paladino	The 60 Four	"Take Your Mama"	✔	Team full	—	✔
Episode 12 (Sunday, 6 September)	6	Melanie C	"God Is a Woman"	Cleo Paladino	Edde Masson	"No Time to Die"	Team Full	Team full	—	—
Episode 13 (Monday, 7 September)	1	Melanie C	"Rebel Yell"	Jack Hughes	Moniquewa Williams	"Jealous Type"	Team full	Team full	—	—
Episode 13 (Monday, 7 September)	1	Melanie C	"Rebel Yell"	Jack Hughes	Enza Russo	"Don't Let the Sun Go Down on Me"	Team full	Team full	—	—
Episode 13 (Monday, 7 September)	2	Ronan	"Need You Now"	Phoebe Rose	Daisha Auda	"At Last"	Team full	Team full	✔	—
Episode 13 (Monday, 7 September)	2	Ronan	"Need You Now"	Phoebe Rose	Brooklyn Sauer	"Dancing on My Own"	Team full	Team full	Team full	—
Episode 13 (Monday, 7 September)	3	Kate	"Pillowtalk"	Bertie Anderson	Cris J	"Make You Feel My Love"	Team full	Team full	Team full	—
Episode 13 (Monday, 7 September)	3	Kate	"Pillowtalk"	Bertie Anderson	Carla Venkataya	"Into the Unknown"	Team full	Team full	Team full	—
Episode 13 (Monday, 7 September)	3	Kate	"Pillowtalk"	Bertie Anderson	Madeline Beckett	"Eternal Flame"	Team full	Team full	Team full	—
Episode 13 (Monday, 7 September)	4	Richard	N/A^{4}		Cherry Green	"Another One Bites the Dust"	Team full	Team full	Team full	—
Episode 13 (Monday, 7 September)	4	Richard	N/A^{4}		Saem Millward	"Fly Me to the Moon"	Team full	Team full	Team full	—
Episode 13 (Monday, 7 September)	4	Richard	N/A^{4}		Dicko	"I Don't Want to Miss a Thing"	Team full	Team full	Team full	—
Episode 13 (Monday, 7 September)	5	Melanie C	"Gangsta's Paradise"	Yung Milla	Josh McCauley	"Another Love"	Team full	Team full	Team full	—
Episode 13 (Monday, 7 September)	5	Melanie C	"Gangsta's Paradise"	Yung Milla	Charlotte MacPhail	"Greedy"	Team full	Team full	Team full	—
Episode 13 (Monday, 7 September)	5	Melanie C	"Gangsta's Paradise"	Yung Milla	Litia Keni	"Favorite Crime"	Team full	Team full	Team full	—
Episode 13 (Monday, 7 September)	6	Kate	"Everybody Hurts"	Charlotte June	Wave Raiders	"All the Small Things"	Team full	Team full	Team full	✔
Episode 13 (Monday, 7 September)	6	Kate	"Everybody Hurts"	Charlotte June	Fox Stapleton	"Daisies"	Team full	Team full	Team full	Team full

^4 Richard opted to not advance any of the three artists in this knockout after he felt none of them "rose to the occasion". As a result, this left him with one less artist for the quarterfinals.

== Finals ==
=== Quarterfinals ===
The quarterfinals aired on 13 and 14 September. In this round, the four artists on each team (three on Team Richard) perform for two spots on their respective team in the semifinal. Each coach decides which artists will advance. Teams Ronan and Richard performed on Sunday, while Teams Melanie C and Kate performed on Monday.

Quarterfinal results
Episode	Order	Coach	Artist	Song	Result
Episode 14 (Sunday, 13 September 2026)	1	Ronan	The 60 Four	"12 to 12"	Ronan's Choice
Episode 14 (Sunday, 13 September 2026)	2	Ronan	Leyla Sabo	"Skyscraper"	Ronan's Choice
Episode 14 (Sunday, 13 September 2026)	3	Richard	Tommy Novak	"Against All Odds (Take a Look at Me Now)"	Richard's Choice
Episode 14 (Sunday, 13 September 2026)	4	Ronan	Phoebe Rose	"If It Makes You Happy"	Eliminated
Episode 14 (Sunday, 13 September 2026)	5	Richard	Wave Raiders	"Are You Gonna Be My Girl"	Eliminated
Episode 14 (Sunday, 13 September 2026)	6	Ronan	Jamie Koul	"My My My!"	Eliminated
Episode 14 (Sunday, 13 September 2026)	7	Richard	Tika Cetinich	"Alone"	Richard's Choice
Episode 15 (Monday, 14 September 2026)	1	Melanie C	Jack Hughes	"Let Me Entertain You"	Eliminated
Episode 15 (Monday, 14 September 2026)	2	Melanie C	Cleo Paladino	"Over the Rainbow"	Eliminated
Episode 15 (Monday, 14 September 2026)	3	Kate	Victoria Knight	"Numb"	Eliminated
Episode 15 (Monday, 14 September 2026)	4	Melanie C	Taylor Beadle-Williams	"I'm Every Woman"	Melanie C's Choice
Episode 15 (Monday, 14 September 2026)	5	Kate	Charlotte June	"Adore U"	Kate's Choice
Episode 15 (Monday, 14 September 2026)	6	Kate	Daisha Auda	"Tightrope"	Kate's Choice
Episode 15 (Monday, 14 September 2026)	7	Kate	Bertie Anderson	"Thong Song"	Eliminated
Episode 15 (Monday, 14 September 2026)	8	Melanie C	Yung Milla	"Pray for Me"	Melanie C's Choice

=== Semi-final ===
The Semi-finals aired on 20 September. The 8 remaining artists sing different songs for a place in the Grand Finale. At the end of the episode, coaches are only allowed to pick one artist from their team to advance to the Grand Finale.

Semi-final results
Episode	Order	Coach	Artist	Song	Result
Episode 16 (Sunday, 20 September 2026)	1	Ronan	The 60 Four	"September"	Ronan's Choice
Episode 16 (Sunday, 20 September 2026)	2	Richard	Tika Cetinich	"Set Fire to the Rain"	Eliminated
Episode 16 (Sunday, 20 September 2026)	3	Kate	Charlotte June	"Ceilings"	Eliminated
Episode 16 (Sunday, 20 September 2026)	4	Melanie C	Taylor Beadle-Williams	"Kiss from a Rose"	Eliminated
Episode 16 (Sunday, 20 September 2026)	5	Richard	Tommy Novak	"Angels"	Richard's Choice
Episode 16 (Sunday, 20 September 2026)	6	Kate	Daisha Auda	"Rise Up"	Kate's Choice
Episode 16 (Sunday, 20 September 2026)	7	Ronan	Leyla Sabo	"Dancing Queen"	Eliminated
Episode 16 (Sunday, 20 September 2026)	8	Melanie C	Yung Milla	"Down Under"	Melanie C's Choice

=== Grand Finale ===
The Grand Finale aired on 27 September 2026. Each artist performed a solo song and a duet with their coach. Similar to the last six seasons, this was the only episode of the season where the results were determined by public vote and not by the coaches.

Yung Milla from Team Melanie C was declared the winner of the season, marking Melanie C's first win as a coach on the Australian version of The Voice. Milla was the first rapper and first Indigenous artist in The Voice Australia history to win the show.

Finale results
Coach	Contestant	Order	Solo song	Order	Duet song	Result
Melanie C	Yung Milla	1	"Changes"	7	"Never Be the Same Again"	Winner
Richard Marx	Tommy Novak	2	"The Horses"	5	"Summer of '69"	Third place
Kate Miller-Heidke	Daisha Auda	3	"Together Again"	6	"Angel"	Runner-Up
Ronan Keating	The 60 Four	4	"Die with a Smile"	8	"You Got It (The Right Stuff)"	Fourth place

Non-competition performances
Order	Performers	Song
17.1	The Top 4	"Sweet Disposition"
17.2	Kate Miller-Heidke (with Melanie C on backing vocals)	"Butterflies"

== Ratings ==
Colour key:

– Highest rating during the season
– Lowest rating during the season

The Voice season fifthteen National viewership and nightly position
Episode		Original airdate	Timeslot	National Viewers	Night Rank	Source
1	"Blind Auditions"	2 August 2026	Sunday 7:00 pm	1,102,000	2	
2	"Blind Auditions"	3 August 2026	Monday 7:30 pm	890,000	6	
3	"Blind Auditions"	4 August 2026	Tuesday 7:30 pm	898,000	4	
4	"Blind Auditions"	10 August 2026	Monday 7:30 pm	918,000	5	
5	"Blind Auditions"	11 August 2026	Tuesday 7:30 pm	928,000	4	
6	"Blind Auditions"	17 August 2026	Monday 7:30 pm	1,007,000	4	
7	"Blind Auditions"	18 August 2026	Tuesday 7:30 pm	953,000	4	
8	"Blind Auditions"	24 August 2026	Monday 7:30 pm	1,027,000	5	
9	"Blind Auditions"	25 August 2026	Tuesday 7:30 pm	945,000	4	
10	"Blind Auditions" "Second Chance"	30 August 2026	Sunday 7:00 pm	1,087,000	4	
11	"Second Chance"	31 August 2026	Monday 7:30 pm	965,000	4	
12	"Knockouts"	6 September 2026	Sunday 7:00 pm	1,089,000	2	
13	"Knockouts"	7 September 2026	Monday 7:30 pm	988,000	4	
14	"Quarterfinals"	13 September 2026	Sunday 7:00 pm	1,043,000	4	
15	"Quarterfinals"	14 September 2026	Monday 7:30 pm	930,000	5	
16	"Semi-final"	20 September 2026	Sunday 7:00 pm	1,118,000	4	
17	"Grand Finale"	27 September 2026	Sunday 7:00 pm	1,227,000	3	
