= Yung Milla =

Australian rapper

- Born: Levi Colin Nichaloff Darwin, Northern Territory, Australia
- Genre: Rap
- Instrument: Vocals
- Years active: 2021–present

Levi Colin Nichaloff, known professionally as Yung Milla, is an Aboriginal Australian rapper. Originally from Darwin in the Northern Territory, Yung Milla began his career in 2021 and has since released various singles. In 2026, he won the fifteenth season of The Voice Australia, where he was coached by Melanie C. He has the distinction of being the first rapper in the history of the show to win.

== Early and personal life ==
Yung Milla was born as Levi Nichaloff in Darwin. He is of the Marranunggu people in the Litchfield National Park area of the Northern Territory. His brother is hip hop musician J-Milla. He describes wanting to pursue music since a young age and cites his brother as an influence personally and professionally. Yung Milla works as an adventure therapist in the Northern Territory with the goal of helping kids through troubled times.

== Career ==
=== 2021–2025: Career beginnings ===
In 2021, Yung Milla released "Better Days", his debut single. He released the single as an independent artist. His second single, "Land Down Under", was released on 22 November 2023. These releases were followed by "BOSSIN'" and "Rain" in 2024 and 2025, respectively. His music centrally focuses on his upbringing and overcoming difficulties.

=== 2026–present: The Voice Australia ===
In 2026, Yung Milla auditioned for the fifteenth season of The Voice Australia. In his audition, he performed his brother J-Milla's song "All My Life". All four of the show's coaches (Ronan Keating, Melanie C, Kate Miller-Heidke, and Richard Marx expressed interest in working with him by turning their chairs. After his initial audition, J-Milla joined him onstage to perform the song together. Before choosing his coach, Melanie C blocked Marx, making Marx not eligible to be picked. Yung Milla chose to join Team Melanie C where he won the season on 27 September 2026.

denotes winner.

The Voice performances and results (2026)
Episode	Song	Original Artist	Result
Audition	"All My Life"	J-Milla	All four chairs turned; Richard Marx blocked; joined Team Melanie C
Knockouts	"Gangsta's Paradise" (vs Josh McCauley, Charlotte MacPhail, and Litia Keni)	Coolio	Advanced via coach's decision
Quarterfinal	"Pray for Me"	The Weeknd & Kendrick Lamar	Advanced via coach's decision
Semi-final	"Down Under"	Men at Work	Advanced via coach's decision
Grand Final	"Changes"	Tupac Shakur	Winner
Grand Final	"Never Be the Same Again" (with Melanie C)	Melanie C	Winner

In October 2026, Yung Milla released "Lethal", a song he wrote whilst competing on The Voice.

== Artistry ==
Yung Milla's music is rooted in his lived experiences growing up in the southern suburbs of Darwin. His lyrical content frequently addresses the harsh urban realities of regional Australia, touching on themes of systemic hardship, community struggles, personal redemption, and the impacts of youth incarceration. Despite dealing with heavy subject matter, his sound maintains an uplifting core. Describing his philosophy on sound, Yung Milla has noted that his music aims to provide "good vibes" that feel "great for the soul," balancing raw truth with soulfulness.

== Discography ==
=== Singles ===
==== As lead artist ====
Title	Year	Album / EP
"Cold Shoulder"	2020	Non-album single
"Better Days"	2021	Non-album single
"Used to Be"	2022	Non-album single
"Land Down Under"	2023	Non-album single
"BOSSIN'"	2024	Non-album single
"Shine"	2024	Non-album single
"They Don't Know"	2024	Non-album single
"Lose Control"	2024	Non-album single
"Rain"	2025	Non-album single
"Higher"	2026	Non-album single
"Lethal"	2026	Non-album single

==== As featured artist ====
Title	Year	Primary artist(s)	Album / EP
"The Devil Come Bout"	2022	Yung Milla (featured artist)	Non-album single
"Dat Dat"	2022	R8M (feat. R8M & Yung Milla)	Non-album single

Preceded by Alyssa Delpopolo	The Voice winner 2026	Succeeded by TBA
