= Chris Cobb (musician) =

Australian singer songwriter

- Born: Rabaul, Papua New Guinea
- Genres: Country music
- Occupations: Singer; songwriter; guitar
- Instruments: Vocals, guitar
- Years active: 2025–present
- Website: www.chriscobbmusic.com

Chris Cobb is a Papua New Guinean born, country singer and songwriter based on the Sunshine Coast, Queensland of Australia since 2022.

In August 2026, Cobb released the studio More Questions Than Answers, which became his first to enter a national chart, debuting at number 47 on the ARIA Albums Chart.

== Early life ==
Cobb was born in Rabaul and grew up in the small gold-mining town of Bulolo, Papua New Guinea. He learned traditional Morobe chants from his grandfather, country music from his uncle, and Australian rock classics from his father.

He was the lead singer of Papua New Guinea rock bands, Barike Band. In July 2026, Cobb reflected saying "Playing in that rock band during that time felt pretty cool, and there were moments when sometimes it gets very rowdy because people have a little bit too much to drink and when they get wild, it really gets wild. Someone starts a fight and then it just crawls and connects to a different one."

In 2022, Cobb left Papua New Guinea and relocated to the Sunshine Coast, Australia.

== Career ==
=== 2025-present: The Voice and More Questions Than Answers ===
In 2025, Cobb auditioned for the 14th season or The Voice (Australia). He sang "When the War Is Over" achieving 4 "I Want You" buttons and choosing team Ronan Keating.

The Voice performances and results (2025)
Episode	Song	Original Artist	Result
Audition	"When the War Is Over"	Cold Chisel	Through to The Battles
The Battles	"Bed of Roses" (vs Mitchell Dormer)	Bon Jovi	Lost battle, saved by Richard Marx, through to Knockouts
Knockouts	"In the Stars"	Benson Boone	Through to The Showdowns
The Showdowns	"The Flame"" (vs Bella Parnell)	Cheap Trick	Lost in The Showdowns and eliminated (placing 9th to 16th)

In September 2025, Cobb performed at the Grand Final of the Papua New Guinea National Rugby League in Port Moresby.

In January 2026, Cobb performed with James Blundell and Patsy & Dave at the Tamworth Country Music Festival.

In June 2026, Cobb announced the forthcoming release of his debut studio album, saying "“It could be a bit of a surprise package. There is definitely the heart and soul of Chris Cobb and that beautiful magic still in that album, maybe just delivered in a different way, and that is why we call it More Questions Than Answers".

In August 2026, Cobb released More Questions Than Answers and it debuted at number 47 on the ARIA Albums Chart.

== Discography ==
=== Studio albums ===
List of albums, with selected details
Title	Details	Peak chart positions
Title	Details	AUS
More Questions Than Answers	Released: 7 August 2026; Label: Ambition Entertainment; Format: CD, digital download	47
