= Alyssa Delpopolo =

Australian singer-songwriter

- Genres: Pop; jazz; R&B
- Instrument: Vocals
- Years active: 2021–present

Alyssa Delpopolo is an Australian singer-songwriter. She won the fourteenth season of The Voice Australia on 2 November 2025, where she was coached by Kate Miller-Heidke. Delpopolo became the first invited and "stolen" artist to win in the show's history as she first was on Ronan Keating's team before becoming part of Miller-Heidke's team. She received $100,000 and an industry recording development package upon winning.

== Early and personal life ==
In 2021, Delpopolo was named Sony's Junior Songwriter of the Year, and in 2024 was named Sydney Senior Singer of the Year. She currently resides in Sydney and is Catholic. Prior to winning The Voice Australia, Delpopolo worked at Bunnings, but exclaimed she was "definitely quitting" after her win.

== Career ==
=== 2025–present: The Voice Australia and upcoming music ===
In 2025, Delpopolo attended blind audition tapings for The Voice Australia. After initially performing a snippet of Amy Winehouse's "Valerie", upon hearing her sing, coach Kate Miller-Heidke invited her to audition for the show, despite not having applied. She performed "Lose Control" in the blind auditions and got the four coaches, Miller-Heidke, Ronan Keating, Richard Marx, and Melanie C to turn for her. Keating then used the Ultimate block on Delpopolo, defaulting her to his team. During the Battles, she was defeated by fellow Team Ronan artist Ellaphon Ta, but was saved by all four coaches and chose to join Miller-Heidke's team. She was declared the winner of the season on 2 November 2025.

denotes winner.

The Voice performances and results (2025)
Episode	Song	Original Artist	Result
Audition	"Lose Control"	Teddy Swims	Through to The Battles
The Battles	"Gravity" (vs Ellaphon Ta)	John Mayer	Lost battle, stolen by Kate Miller-Heidke, through to Knockouts
Knockouts	"Chains"	Tina Arena	Through to The Showdowns
The Showdowns	"Hopelessly Devoted to You"	Olivia Newton-John	Through to the Semi-final
Semi-final	"Oscar Winning Tears"	Raye	Saved by Coach. Through to Grand Final
Grand Final	"It's All Coming Back to Me Now"	Celine Dion	Winner
Grand Final	"Lose You to Love Me" (with Kate Miller-Heidke)	Selena Gomez	Winner

Delopolo's debut single, "Cruel", was released on 5 December 2025, with further releases in 2026. She stated that through her music, she hopes to "inspire youth to just be themselves... to be able to give a message". Delpopolo appeared as a musical guest at the Carols by Candlelight concert on 13 December 2025. In 2026, her second single, "You Made Me Crazy", was released on 27 March and her third single, "My Forever Person", was released on 19 June.

== Artistry ==
Delpopolo incorporates elements of jazz, pop, and R&B in her singing and cites Amy Winehouse, Elton John, Arctic Monkeys, and Yebba as influences.

== Discography ==
=== Singles ===
List of singles, showing year released, and name of album
Title	Year	Album
"Cruel"	2025	TBA
"You Made Me Crazy"	2026	TBA
"My Forever Person"	2026	TBA

Preceded by Reuben De Melo	The Voice winner 2025	Succeeded by Yung Milla
