= The Voice (Australian TV series) season 14 =

Season of television series

The Voice
- Season 14
- Promotional poster featuring coaches Melanie C, Keating, Miller-Heidke, and Marx
- Hosted by: Sonia Kruger
- Coaches: Kate Miller-Heidke; Ronan Keating; Richard Marx; Melanie C
- Winner: Alyssa Delpopolo
- Winning coach: Kate Miller-Heidke
- Runners-up: Bella Parnell, Cassie Henderson, and Cle Morgan

Release
- Original network: Seven Network
- Original release: 10 August – 2 November 2025

Season chronology
- ← Previous; Season 13 Next → Season 15

The fourteenth season of The Voice Australia began airing on 10 August 2025. On 28 January 2025, it was revealed on the show's social media that only Kate Miller-Heidke would return as a coach from the previous season for the fourteenth season. At the same time, it was announced that former coach Ronan Keating would return after an eight-season hiatus, replacing Adam Lambert. Melanie C and Richard Marx were announced to debut as coaches, replacing LeAnn Rimes, and Guy Sebastian, respectively.

Similar to the previous four seasons, the finale was pre-recorded and the winner was determined by a viewer poll. Alyssa Delpopolo was declared the winner, marking Kate Miller-Heidke's first win as a coach. She became the second artist that was not scheduled to audition in the audition round to win a season of a major singing competition anywhere in the world after Laine Hardy in American Idol season 17 in 2019 (Miller-Heidke invited her to audition after hearing her sing in the audience). Delpopolo also became the first stolen artist to win in the show's history (Miller-Heidke stole her in the battles from Ronan Keating's team).

== Overview ==
=== Coaches and host ===
In October 2024, it was announced that Guy Sebastian would not be returning to the show after six seasons as a coach. On 28 January 2025, it was announced that Kate Miller-Heidke would return as a coach for the fourteenth season for her second season from the previous season. In the meantime, former coach Ronan Keating returned to the panel after an eight-season hiatus, while Melanie C and Richard Marx joined the panel as debuting coaches. Sonia Kruger returned as host.

== Teams ==
Coaches and host of season 14

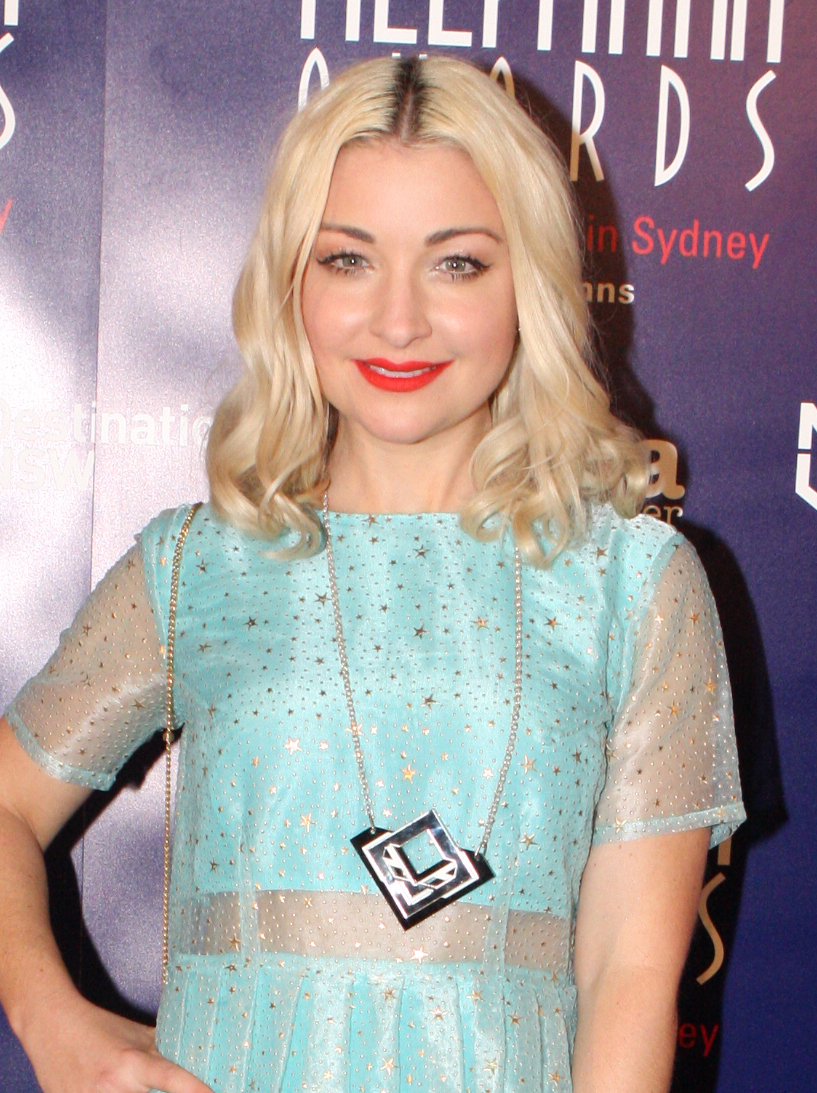
Kate Miller-Heidke

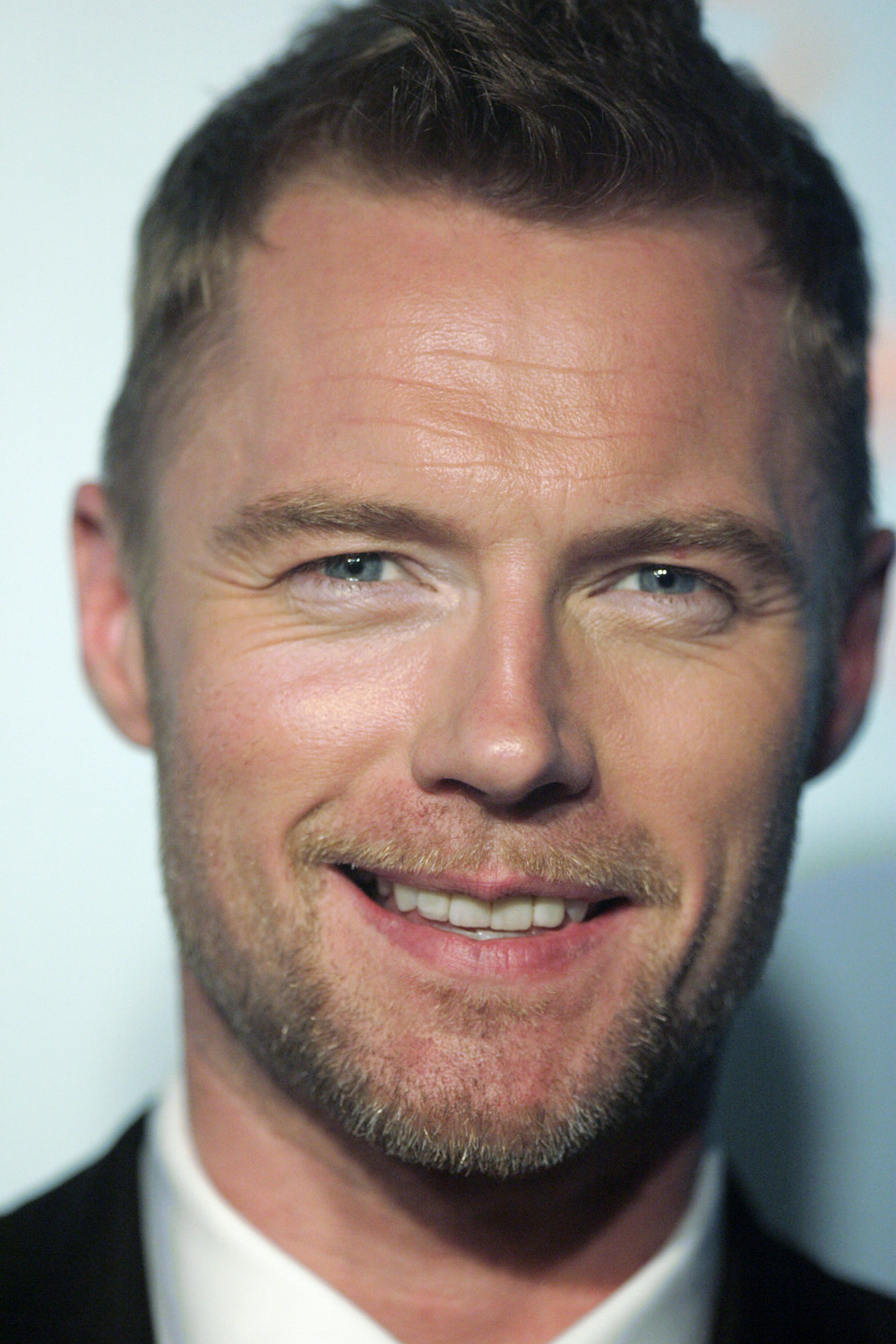
Ronan Keating

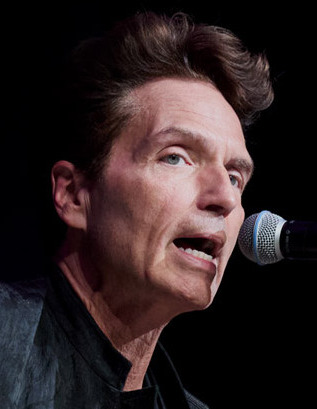
Richard Marx

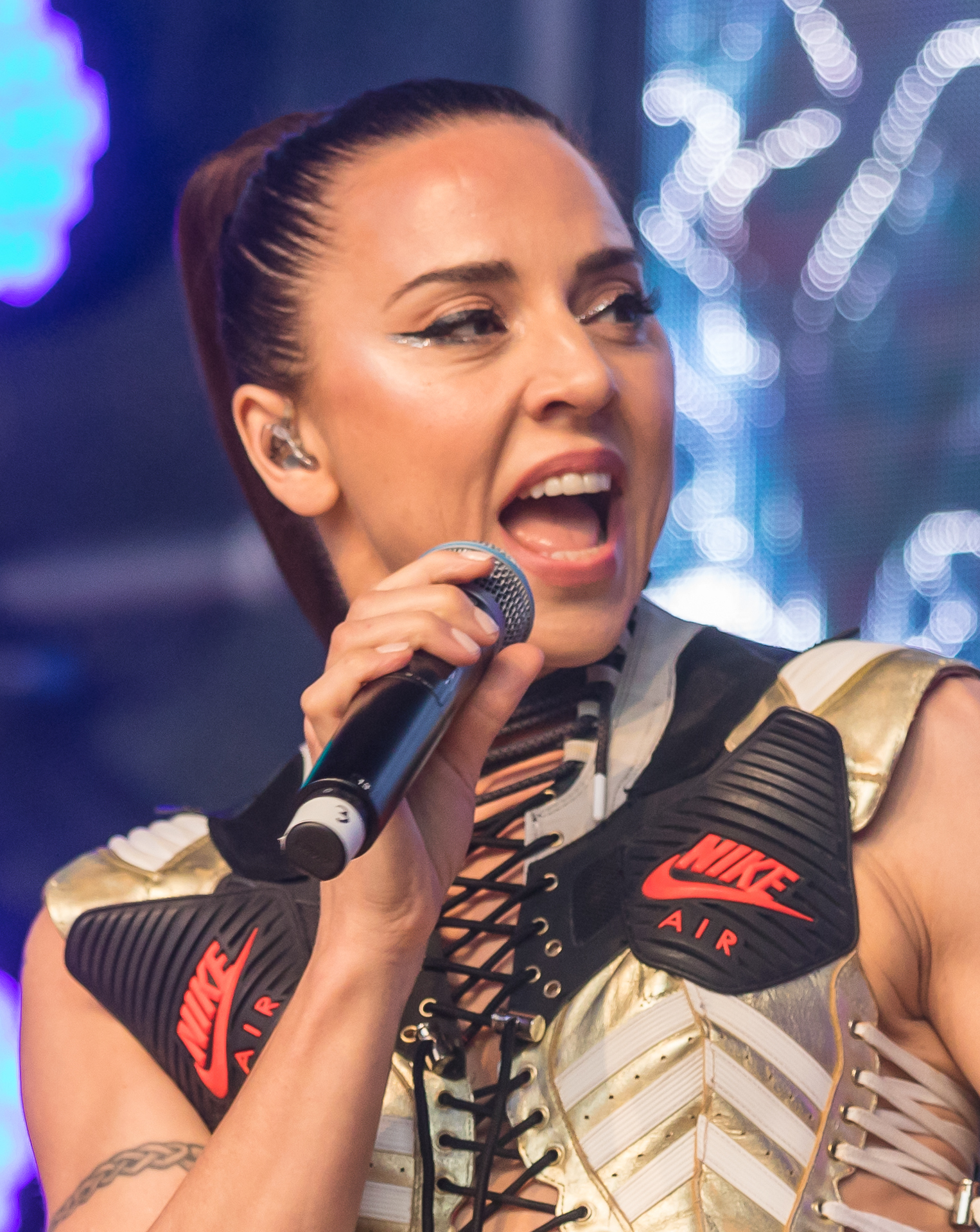
Melanie C

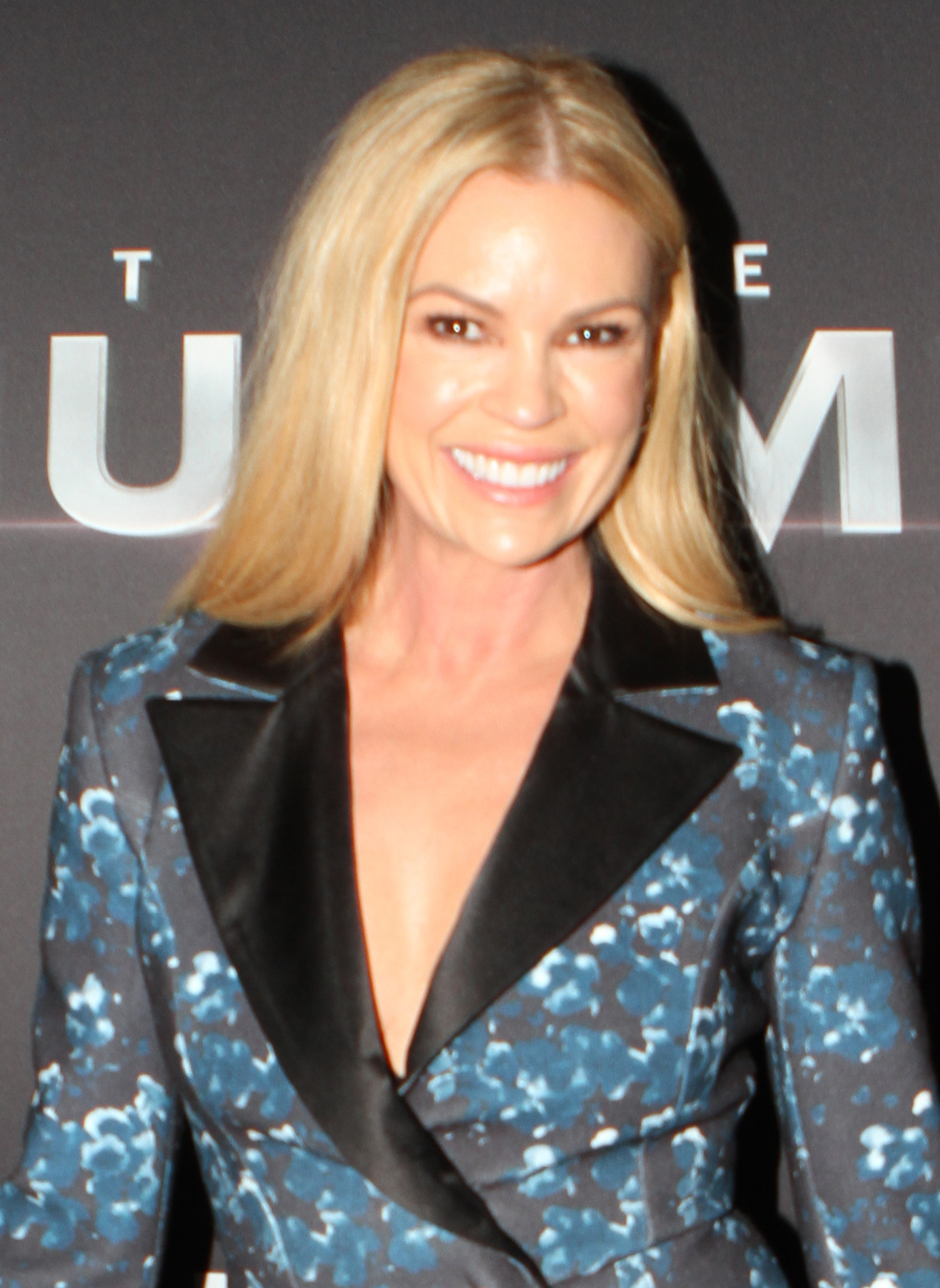
Sonia Kruger

Colour key

- Winner
- Runner-Up
- 3rd place
- 4th place
- Eliminated in the Semifinals
- Eliminated in the Showdowns
- Eliminated in the Knockouts
- Stolen in the Battles
- Eliminated in the Battles

Season fourteen coaching teams
Coach	Top 40 Artists			
Kate Miller-Heidke				
Kate Miller-Heidke	Alyssa Delpopolo	Sienna Langenheim	James Van Cooper	Charlie O'Derry
Kate Miller-Heidke	Jayd Luna	Amber Scates	~~Euan Hart~~	Marie Brunelli
Kate Miller-Heidke	Cecily De Gooyer	Brenton Kneen	Justin Rynne	
Ronan Keating				
Ronan Keating	Cle Morgan	Ellaphon Ta	Mitchell Dormer	Milly Monk
Ronan Keating	Hunter Black	Tiffney Reynolds	~~Chris Cobb~~	~~Alyssa Delpopolo~~
Ronan Keating	Olivia Coe Fox	Saralyn Matla		
Richard Marx				
Richard Marx	Bella Parnell	Joseph Vuicakau	Rose Carleo	Chris Cobb
Richard Marx	Bianka Jakoveljevic	Jakamo Sharpe	Ethan Calway	Ally Friendship
Richard Marx	Hailey J	Cait Jamieson	THR3PM	
Melanie C				
Melanie C	Cassie Henderson	Euan Hart	Gemma Hollingsworth	Callan James
Melanie C	Meg Drummond	Matthias Gault	Lilli Vitagliano	Boriss Bendrups
Melanie C	Sharon-Rose Rateni	Cherie Sandoval	XAZ	
Note: Italicised names are artists stolen from another team during the battles (names struck through within former teams). Underlined names are artists saved by their coach during the battles.

== Blind auditions ==
In the blind auditions, the coaches complete their teams with 10 members each. The regular block returned from last season, each coach receives one to effectively block another coach from getting an artist. Additionally, the ultimate block, which was introduced last season, returned. The feature blocks all other coaches, defaulting the artist to the user's team. With either block, the coach who is blocked is null and invalid to pitch for the artist. Like last season, a coach can block at any time, even during their pitch, as long as the coach turned their chair.

Blind auditions colour key
✔	Coach hit the "I WANT YOU" button
	Artist joined this coach's team
	Artist eliminated with no coach pressing "I WANT YOU" button
✘	All other coaches blocked from one coach pressing the Ultimate Block
✘	Coach pressed "I WANT YOU" button, but was blocked by another coach from getting the artist
	Blocked by Kate; Blocked by Ronan; Blocked by Richard; Blocked by Melanie C

Blind auditions result
Episode	Order	Artist	Age	Song	Coach's and artist's choices			
Episode	Order	Artist	Age	Song	Kate	Ronan	Richard	Melanie C
Episode 1 (Sunday, 10 August)	1	Jakamo Sharpe	25	"Beggin'"	✔	✔	✔	✔
Episode 1 (Sunday, 10 August)	2	Bianka Jakoveljevic	16	"I See Red"	✔	✔	✔	✔
Episode 1 (Sunday, 10 August)	3	Charlie O'Derry	17	"End of Beginning"	✔	✔	✔	✔
Episode 1 (Sunday, 10 August)	4	Amber Scates	25	"Groove Is in the Heart"	✔	—	—	✔
Episode 1 (Sunday, 10 August)	5	Zak Armstrong	19	"Footloose"	—	—	—	—
Episode 1 (Sunday, 10 August)	6	Brenton Kneen	33	"Stayin' Alive"	✔	✔	✔	✔
Episode 1 (Sunday, 10 August)	7	Cassie Henderson	26	"Good Luck, Babe!"	✔	✔	✔	✔
Episode 2 (Monday, 11 August)	1	Milly Monk	24	"Edge of Seventeen"	✔	✔	✔	✔
Episode 2 (Monday, 11 August)	2	Lyla Foxx	21	"Defying Gravity"	—	—	—	—
Episode 2 (Monday, 11 August)	3	Mitchell Dormer	33	"Beautiful Things"	✔	✔	✔	✔
Episode 2 (Monday, 11 August)	4	Hailey J	19	"I Will Always Love You"	✔	—	✔	—
Episode 2 (Monday, 11 August)	5	Vixens of Fall	N/A	"Jolene"	—	—	—	—
Episode 2 (Monday, 11 August)	6	Ruby & Macey	N/A	"I Wish I Was a Punk Rocker (With Flowers in My Hair)"	—	—	—	—
Episode 2 (Monday, 11 August)	7	THR3PM	N/A	"You Don't Treat Me No Good"	—	—	✔	—
Episode 2 (Monday, 11 August)	8	Chris Cobb	35	"When the War Is Over"	✔	✔	✔	✔
Episode 3 (Tuesday, 12 August)	1	Rose Carleo	54	"Rock and Roll"	✔	✔	✔	✔
Episode 3 (Tuesday, 12 August)	2	Gemma Hollingsworth	19	"Prada"	✘	✔	—	✔
Episode 3 (Tuesday, 12 August)	3	Raffaele Pierno	50	"Nessun dorma"	—	—	—	—
Episode 3 (Tuesday, 12 August)	4	Hunter Black	21	"This Year's Love"	✔	✔	—	—
Episode 3 (Tuesday, 12 August)	5	Maddi Coleman	25	"Holding Out for a Hero"	—	—	—	—
Episode 3 (Tuesday, 12 August)	6	James Van Cooper	28	"Stand By Me"	✔	✘	✘	✘
Episode 4 (Sunday, 17 August)	1	Sienna Langenheim	19	"Glory Box"	✔	✔	✘	✔
Episode 4 (Sunday, 17 August)	2	Cait Jamieson	19	"Right Here Waiting"	✔	✔	✔	✔
Episode 4 (Sunday, 17 August)	3	Ronnie Joudo	56	"Take Me Home, Country Roads"	—	—	—	—
Episode 4 (Sunday, 17 August)	4	XAZ	20	"Savage"	—	✔	✔	✔
Episode 4 (Sunday, 17 August)	5	Adam Perumal	18	"Fly Me to the Moon"	—	—	—	—
Episode 4 (Sunday, 17 August)	6	Ally Friendship	38	"Call Me"	✔	—	✔	—
Episode 4 (Sunday, 17 August)	7	Joseph Vuicakau	35	"A Change Is Gonna Come"	✘	✔	✔	✔
Episode 5 (Monday, 18 August)	1	Callan James	25	"Good as Hell"	✔	✔	✔	✔
Episode 5 (Monday, 18 August)	2	Boriss Bendrups	18	"Maneater"	✔	—	—	✔
Episode 5 (Monday, 18 August)	3	Sybella	21	"Take On Me"	—	—	—	—
Episode 5 (Monday, 18 August)	4	Justin Rynne	27	"Canned Heat"	✔	—	—	—
Episode 5 (Monday, 18 August)	5	Tayla Paula	23	"Genie in a Bottle"	—	—	—	—
Episode 5 (Monday, 18 August)	6	Ocean Lim	N/A	"Fireflies"	—	—	—	—
Episode 5 (Monday, 18 August)	7	Olivia Mae	N/A	"Believe"	—	—	—	—
Episode 5 (Monday, 18 August)	8	Alyssa Delpopolo	19	"Lose Control"	✘	✔	✘	✘
Episode 6 (Tuesday, 19 August)	1	Matthias Gault	21	"When You Were Young"	✔	✔	✔	✔
Episode 6 (Tuesday, 19 August)	2	Lilli Vitagliano	22	"Say You'll Be There"	—	✔	—	✔
Episode 6 (Tuesday, 19 August)	3	Charlie Fishwick	19	"Hallucinate"	—	—	—	—
Episode 6 (Tuesday, 19 August)	4	Sharon-Rose Rateni	19	"Water"	—	—	—	✔
Episode 6 (Tuesday, 19 August)	5	Chris Dixon	33	"Livin' on a Prayer"	—	—	—	—
Episode 6 (Tuesday, 19 August)	6	Ethan Calway	26	"Walking in Memphis"	✘	✘	✔	✘
Episode 7 (Monday, 25 August)	1	Ellaphon Ta	27	"The Middle"	✔	✔	✔	✔
Episode 7 (Monday, 25 August)	2	Cherie Sandoval	35	"Livin' la Vida Loca"	✔	—	✔	✔
Episode 7 (Monday, 25 August)	3	Angus	59	"Message In A Bottle"	—	—	—	—
Episode 7 (Monday, 25 August)	4	Euan Hart	25	"Dreams"	✔	✔	—	—
Episode 7 (Monday, 25 August)	5	Tiana Rosie	26	"You Don't Own Me"	—	—	—	—
Episode 7 (Monday, 25 August)	6	Olivia Coe Fox	21	"I Am Australian"	✘	✔	✔	✔
Episode 8 (Tuesday, 26 August)	1	Tiffney Reynolds	34	"When You're Gone"	✔	✔	✔	✔
Episode 8 (Tuesday, 26 August)	2	Mick On Wheels	42	"Age of Reason"	—	—	—	—
Episode 8 (Tuesday, 26 August)	3	Meg Drummond	43	"Everybody's Free" / "I Want Your Soul" / "Rapture"	✘	✘	✘	✔
Episode 8 (Tuesday, 26 August)	4	Cecily De Gooyer	17	"Think of Me"	✔	✔	—	Team full
Episode 8 (Tuesday, 26 August)	5	Max Fernandez	18	"Vienna"	—	—	—	Team full
Episode 8 (Tuesday, 26 August)	6	Bella Parnell	21	"A Song for You"	✔	✔	✔	Team full
Episode 9 (Sunday, 31 August)	1	Cle Morgan	44	"As It Was"	✔	✔	Team full	Team full
Episode 9 (Sunday, 31 August)	2	Jayd Luna	25	"As the World Caves In"	✔	✔	Team full	Team full
Episode 9 (Sunday, 31 August)	3	Glenn Welsh	63	"Sex on Fire"	—	—	Team full	Team full
Episode 9 (Sunday, 31 August)	4	Marie Brunelli	17	"The Greatest"	✔	✔	Team full	Team full
Episode 9 (Sunday, 31 August)	5	Taya Chiappani	18	"The Edge of Glory"	Team full	—	Team full	Team full
Episode 9 (Sunday, 31 August)	6	Saralyn Matla	35	"If Tomorrow Never Comes"	Team full	✔	Team full	Team full

- Alyssa Delpopolo was originally in the audience, but was invited by Miller-Heidke to audition following her rendition of "Valerie".

== Battles ==
The battles aired from 7 to 21 September. Each coach forms duets from two artists on their team. Of the two artists, the coach declares one the winner of the battle. The winner moves on directly to the knockouts. The loser of the battle is either eliminated, "saved" by their coach, or "stolen" by another coach to move on to the knockouts.

Battles colour key
Artist won the Battle and advanced to the Knockouts
Artist lost the Battle, but was stolen by another coach, and, advanced to the Knockouts
Artist lost the Battle, but was saved by their coach, and, advanced to the Knockouts
Artist lost the Battle and was eliminated

Season fourteen battle rounds
Episode	Coach	Order	Winner	Song	Loser	'Steal'/'Save' result			
Episode	Coach	Order	Winner	Song	Loser	Kate	Ronan	Richard	Melanie C
Episode 10 (Sunday, 7 September)	Kate	1	James Van Cooper	"I Was Made for Lovin' You"	Cecily De Gooyer	—	—	—	—
Episode 10 (Sunday, 7 September)	Melanie C	2	Meg Drummond	"Dirty Cash (Money Talks)"	XAZ	—	—	—	—
Episode 10 (Sunday, 7 September)	Richard	3	Bianka Jakoveljevic	"That's Freedom"	Cait Jamieson	—	—	—	—
Episode 10 (Sunday, 7 September)	Ronan	4	Ellaphon Ta	"Gravity"	Alyssa Delpopolo	✔	✔	✔	✔
Episode 10 (Sunday, 7 September)	Melanie C	5	Lilli Vitagliano	"Training Season"	Cherie Sandoval	Team full	—	—	—
Episode 10 (Sunday, 7 September)	Kate	6	Charlie O'Derry	"Fade into You"	Brenton Kneen	Team full	—	—	—
Episode 10 (Sunday, 7 September)	Ronan	7	Mitchell Dormer	"Bed of Roses"	Chris Cobb	Team full	✔	✔	✔
Episode 11 (Sunday, 14 September)	Richard	1	Joseph Vuicakau	"I Still Haven't Found What I'm Looking For"	Hailey J	Team full	—	Team full	—
Episode 11 (Sunday, 14 September)	Kate	2	Sienna Langenheim	"The Blower's Daughter"	Euan Hart	Team full	—	Team full	✔
Episode 11 (Sunday, 14 September)	Kate	3	Amber Scates	"Gimme! Gimme! Gimme! (A Man After Midnight)"	Justin Rynne	Team full	—	Team full	Team full
Episode 11 (Sunday, 14 September)	Ronan	4	Tiffney Reynolds	"Like a Prayer"	Saralyn Matla	Team full	—	Team full	Team full
Episode 11 (Sunday, 14 September)	Melanie C	5	Matthias Gault	"Creep"	Boriss Bendrups	Team full	—	Team full	Team full
Episode 11 (Sunday, 14 September)	Ronan	6	Cle Morgan	"Strong"	Hunter Black*	Team full	✔	Team full	Team full
Episode 11 (Sunday, 14 September)	Richard	7	Bella Parnell	"The Door"	Ethan Calway	Team full	Team full	Team full	Team full
Episode 12 (Sunday, 21 September)	Richard	1	Rose Carleo	"Gimme Shelter"	Ally Friendship	Team full	Team full	Team full	Team full
Episode 12 (Sunday, 21 September)	Melanie C	2	Callan James	"Positions"	Sharon-Rose Rateni	Team full	Team full	Team full	Team full
Episode 12 (Sunday, 21 September)	Kate	3	Jayd Luna	"Pink Pony Club"	Marie Brunelli	Team full	Team full	Team full	Team full
Episode 12 (Sunday, 21 September)	Richard	4	Jakamo Sharpe	"What Goes Around... Comes Around"	THR3PM	Team full	Team full	Team full	Team full
Episode 12 (Sunday, 21 September)	Ronan	5	Milly Monk	"Unwritten"	Olivia Coe Fox	Team full	Team full	Team full	Team full
Episode 12 (Sunday, 21 September)	Melanie C	6	Cassie Henderson	"Messy"	Gemma Hollingsworth*	✔	✔	✔	✔

- Hunter Black was originally eliminated after Keating opted not to save him directly following the battle. However, Keating brought him back on stage and saved him after stating he "made a big mistake" not saving Black originally.
- All coaches attempted to use a lifeline on Gemma Hollingsworth in episode 12, after previously using their lifelines. Melanie C used her save, while Keating, Miller-Heidke, and Marx followed by using their steals. Hollingsworth opted to stay on Team Melanie C, with Melanie C having one extra member in knockouts.

== Knockouts ==
The knockouts aired on 28 September & 12 October. The remaining six artists (seven for Team Melanie C) on each team sing a song based on a theme picked out by their coaches for four spots on their respective team. The four winners per team move on to the showdowns, while the other two artists (three for Team Melanie C) are eliminated. Teams Melanie C and Richard performed on the first night, while Teams Kate and Ronan performed on the second night.

Knockouts colour key
Artist won the Knockout and advanced to the Showdowns
Artist lost the Knockout and was eliminated

Knockouts results
Episode	Order	Coach	Theme	Song	Winners	Loser(s)	Songs
Episode 13 (Sunday, 28 September)	1	Melanie C	Well-known songs reimagined	"California Dreamin'"	Gemma Hollingsworth	Meg Drummond	"Show Me Love"
Episode 13 (Sunday, 28 September)	1	Melanie C	Well-known songs reimagined	"Spotlight"	Callan James	Meg Drummond	"Show Me Love"
Episode 13 (Sunday, 28 September)	2	Richard	Soul singers	"Dance with My Father"	Joseph Vuicakau	Bianka Jakoveljevic	"Call Out My Name"
Episode 13 (Sunday, 28 September)	2	Richard	Soul singers	"Killing Me Softly With His Song"	Bella Parnell	Bianka Jakoveljevic	"Call Out My Name"
Episode 13 (Sunday, 28 September)	3	Melanie C	Glastonbury Festival headliners	"You Oughta Know"	Cassie Henderson	Lilli Vitagliano	"Apple"
Episode 13 (Sunday, 28 September)	3	Melanie C	Glastonbury Festival headliners	"Fall at Your Feet"	Euan Hart	Matthias Gault	"Viva la Vida"
Episode 13 (Sunday, 28 September)	4	Richard	Rockers	"Hello"	Rose Carleo	Jakamo Sharpe	"Too Sweet"
Episode 13 (Sunday, 28 September)	4	Richard	Rockers	"In the Stars"	Chris Cobb	Jakamo Sharpe	"Too Sweet"
Episode 14 (Sunday, 12 October)	1	Kate	Australian songs	"Chains"	Alyssa Delpopolo	Amber Scates	"Don't Call Me Baby"
Episode 14 (Sunday, 12 October)	1	Kate	Australian songs	"Working Class Man"	James Van Cooper	Amber Scates	"Don't Call Me Baby"
Episode 14 (Sunday, 12 October)	2	Ronan	70s, 80s, 90s	"Crazy"	Ellaphon Ta	N/A	
Episode 14 (Sunday, 12 October)	2	Ronan	70s, 80s, 90s	"Broken Wings"	Mitchell Dormer	N/A	
Episode 14 (Sunday, 12 October)	2	Ronan	70s, 80s, 90s	"Roxanne"	Cle Morgan	N/A	
Episode 14 (Sunday, 12 October)	3	Kate	Iconic bands	"Come Together"	Sienna Langenheim	Jayd Luna	"I'd Do Anything for Love (But I Won't Do That)"
Episode 14 (Sunday, 12 October)	3	Kate	Iconic bands	"Champagne Supernova"	Charlie O'Derry	Jayd Luna	"I'd Do Anything for Love (But I Won't Do That)"
Episode 14 (Sunday, 12 October)	4	Ronan	Natural talents	"Seventeen Going Under"	Milly Monk	Tiffney Reynolds	"Heaven Is a Place on Earth"
Episode 14 (Sunday, 12 October)	4	Ronan	Natural talents	"Seventeen Going Under"	Milly Monk	Hunter Black	"Someday, Someday"

- In the knockout with artists Cle Morgan, Mitchell Dormer, and Ellaphon Ta, Keating could not make a decision on which two artists to pick, so he took opted to send all three to the showdowns. This meant that for his team's second knockout with artists Milly Monk, Tiffney Reynolds, and Hunter Black, he could only take one of them through.

=== Showdowns ===
In the Showdowns, Knockout winners sing a song of their choice, then coaches pick two of them to go through the Semifinals.

Showdowns colour key
Artist won the Showdown and advanced to the Semifinals
Artist lost the Showdown and was eliminated

Showdown results
Episode	Order	Coach	Song	Winner(s)	Loser(s)	Song
Episode 13 (Sunday, 28 September)	1	Melanie C	"Somewhere Only We Know"	Cassie Henderson	Callan James	"We Don't Have to Take Our Clothes Off"
Episode 13 (Sunday, 28 September)	1	Melanie C	"Don't You Want Me"	Euan Hart	Gemma Hollingsworth	"When the Party's Over"
Episode 13 (Sunday, 28 September)	2	Richard	"Let's Stay Together"	Joseph Vuicakau	Rose Carleo	"All Fired Up"
Episode 13 (Sunday, 28 September)	2	Richard	"I Put a Spell on You"	Bella Parnell	Chris Cobb	"The Flame"
Episode 14 (Sunday, 12 October)	1	Kate	"Hopelessly Devoted to You"	Alyssa Delpopolo	James Van Cooper	"Take Me Back"
Episode 14 (Sunday, 12 October)	1	Kate	"Angels like You"	Sienna Langenheim	Charlie O'Derry	"You Are the Reason"
Episode 14 (Sunday, 12 October)	2	Ronan	"Giant"	Cle Morgan	Mitchell Dormer	"Someone You Loved"
Episode 14 (Sunday, 12 October)	2	Ronan	"I Can't Make You Love Me"	Ellaphon Ta	Milly Monk	"Joey"

== Finals ==
=== Semi-final ===
The Semi-finals aired on 19 & 26 October. The 8 remaining artists sing different songs for a place in the Grand Final. At the end of the episode, coaches are only allowed to pick one artist from their team to advance to the Grand Final. Like the Knockouts and Showdowns, Teams Melanie C and Richard performed on the first night, while Teams Kate and Ronan performed on the second night.

For the first time in the history of the show, all four artists advancing to the Grand Finale are female.

Semi-final results
Episode	Order	Coach	Artist	Song	Result
Episode 15 (Sunday, 19 October 2025)	1	Richard	Bella Parnell	"Skyfall"	Richard's Choice
Episode 15 (Sunday, 19 October 2025)	2	Richard	Joseph Vuicakau	"Freedom! '90"	Eliminated
Episode 15 (Sunday, 19 October 2025)	3	Melanie C	Euan Hart	"Hungry Eyes"	Eliminated
Episode 15 (Sunday, 19 October 2025)	4	Melanie C	Cassie Henderson	"Green Light"	Melanie C's Choice
Episode 16 (Sunday, 26 October 2025)	1	Ronan	Ellaphon Ta	"Anywhere Away from Here"	Eliminated
Episode 16 (Sunday, 26 October 2025)	2	Ronan	Cle Morgan	"Round Here"	Ronan's Choice
Episode 16 (Sunday, 26 October 2025)	3	Kate	Sienna Langenheim	"Go Your Own Way"	Eliminated
Episode 16 (Sunday, 26 October 2025)	4	Kate	Alyssa Delpopolo	"Oscar Winning Tears"	Kate's Choice

=== Grand Finale ===
The Grand Finale aired on 2 November 2025. Each artist performed a solo song and a duet with their coach. Similar to the last five seasons, this was the only episode of the season where the results were determined by public vote and not by the coaches. Alyssa Delpopolo was declared the winner, marking Kate Miller-Heidke's first win as a coach. Delpopolo became the first invitee and stolen artist in the history of the show to win a season. This was the first Grand Finale in the show’s history featuring all four female artists.

Finale results
Coach	Contestant	Order	Solo song	Order	Duet song	Result
Ronan Keating	Cle Morgan	5	"What About Us"	1	"I Knew You Were Waiting (For Me)"	Fourth place
Kate Miller-Heidke	Alyssa Delpopolo	2	"It's All Coming Back to Me Now"	6	"Lose You to Love Me"	Winner
Melanie C	Cassie Henderson	7	"Teenage Dirtbag"	3	"Bitter Sweet Symphony"	Third place
Richard Marx	Bella Parnell	4	"Ain't Nobody"	8	"Help"	Runner-up

== Contestants who appeared on TV shows ==
- Cassie Henderson was on the first season of The X Factor New Zealand, where she came in fifth place.
- Cle Morgan was on the first season of Australian Idol finishing in the Top 10 (as Cle Wootton). She also appeared on Ship to Shore in 1993 and Popstars in 2002.

== Ratings ==
Colour key:

– Highest rating during the season
– Lowest rating during the season

The Voice season fourteen National viewership and nightly position
Episode		Original airdate	Timeslot	National Viewers	Night Rank	Source
1	"Blind Auditions"	10 August 2025	Sunday 7:00 pm	984,000	4	
2	"Blind Auditions"	11 August 2025	Monday 7:30 pm	859,000	5	
3	"Blind Auditions"	12 August 2025	Tuesday 7:30 pm	812,000	5	
4	"Blind Auditions"	17 August 2025	Sunday 7:00 pm	987,000	4	
5	"Blind Auditions"	18 August 2025	Monday 7:30 pm	944,000	5	
6	"Blind Auditions"	19 August 2025	Tuesday 7:30 pm	911,000	4	
7	"Blind Auditions"	25 August 2025	Monday 7:30 pm	949,000	5	
8	"Blind Auditions"	26 August 2025	Tuesday 7:30 pm	975,000	5	
9	"Blind Auditions"	31 August 2025	Sunday 7:00 pm	1,053,000	4	
10	"Battles"	7 September 2025	Sunday 7:00 pm	944,000	4	
11	"Battles"	14 September 2025	Sunday 7:00 pm	892,000	5	
12	"Battles"	21 September 2025	Sunday 7:00 pm	881,000	5	
13	"Knockouts"	28 September 2025	Sunday 7:00 pm	884,000	5	
14	"Knockouts"	12 October 2025	Sunday 7:00 pm	1,046,000	4	
15	"Semi-finals"	19 October 2025	Sunday 7:00 pm	792,000	5	
16	"Semi-finals"	26 October 2025	Sunday 7:00 pm	751,000	5	
17	"Grand Final"	2 November 2025	Sunday 7:00 pm	842,000	2	
