= Rose Carleo =

Australian singer songwriter

- Rose Carleo on set shooting a music video, 2026

Background information
- Born: Perth, Western Australia; East Fremantle, Western Australia
- Genre: Rock music
- Occupation: Singer/Songwriter/Producer
- Instrument: Vocals/Guitar
- Years active: 1990–present
- Website: https://rosecarleo.com

Rose Carleo is an Australian rock singer and songwriter based in Sydney. Since 2016, Carleo has fronted the Rose Carleo Band. Music historian Glenn A. Baker has described Carleo as "a powerful, explosive and percussive performer."

In May 2026, the Rose Carleo Band released 42 Days, which debuted at number 34 on the ARIA Albums Chart.

== Early life ==
Rose Carleo was born and raised in Fremantle, Western Australia. She grew up in a musically diverse household heavily influenced by her mother, Mary, who was a passionate music fan and a local country music promoter. To provide platforms for local musicians, her mother founded and managed two country music clubs across Perth and secured performance venues for artists.

Carleo's early influences ranged from country music to hard rock. While her mother's stereo frequently played classic artists like Patsy Cline and Charley Pride, it also featured heavy rock acts like Status Quo and AC/DC, which her mother and older brother played loudly at home. Carleo later discovered American singer-songwriters such as Emmylou Harris and The Eagles, which further shaped her artistic tastes.

At the age of 13, Carleo made her first live stage appearance after being dared to sing by her mother at a local event. The performance sparked her interest in becoming a musician. Around the age of 15, she acquired her first acoustic guitar, choosing a model with a hummingbird scratch-plate inspired by the instrument played by Emmylou Harris. During her mid-teens, she won an Encouragement Award at a Western Australian music competition and spent the remainder of her adolescent years performing in and fronting various bands.

== Career ==
In August 2005, Carleo relocated from Western Australia to Brisbane, Queensland, where she established herself within the live music circuit. By December of that year, she entered the studio to record her debut self-titled extended play alongside producer and musician Brendan Radford, which was released the following year. In 2007, Carleo formed a songwriting partnership with country-rock artist Drew McAlister. That same year, she released her debut full-length studio album, Everything I Need, in July 2007, which featured the award-winning vocal duet with McAlister, "Sometimes You Just Know".

In 2008, Carleo collaborated with guitarist Michael Fix to record the charity EP Reach Out, raising funds for suicide awareness; that same year, she received her first Golden Guitar Award nomination. She followed up in 2010 with her second studio album, Life Gets in the Way, featuring the single "That Season Again", which she co-wrote with McAlister.

Carleo relocated to Sydney, New South Wales in 2011 to expand her career within the city's live music scene. She began writing material alongside guitarist and partner Mick Adkins in 2013. In March 2015, she released her third studio album, Time Is Now, which was co-produced by rock producers Mark Opitz and Colin Wynne, alongside Adkins and Carleo. The album launch at Rooty Hill RSL was opened by a video message from music historian Glenn A. Baker, and the record subsequently peaked at No. 38 on the ARIA Australian Artist Albums Chart.

In February 2016, Carleo transitioned from a solo act to front a permanent ensemble, playing the debut show of the Rose Carleo Band at the Bridge Hotel in Rozelle, Sydney. The group's initial lineup was established with Carleo on lead vocals and guitar, Adkins on guitar, Steve King on bass, and Mick O'Shea on drums. In April 2018, the group released their debut blues-rock extended play, Battle Scars, which achieved critical praise from rock publications and reached the top 20 on the iTunes rock charts. In 2024, King departed the group to rejoin Rose Tattoo, and bassist Bill Kervin joined the band.

In August 2025, Carleo auditioned for season 14 of The Voice (Australian TV series). Her blind audition performance of Led Zeppelin's "Rock and Roll" achieved a four-chair turn from the coaches before she selected to join the team of Richard Marx.

The Voice performances and results (2025)
Episode	Song	Original Artist	Result
Audition	"Rock and Roll"	Led Zeppelin	Through to The Battles
The Battles	"Gimme Shelter" (vs Ally Friendship)	The Rolling Stones	Won battle, through to Knockouts
Knockouts	"Hello"	Adele	Through to The Showdowns
The Showdowns	"All Fired Up" (vs Joseph Vuicakau)	Pat Benatar	Lost in The Showdowns and eliminated (placing 9th to 16th)

In April 2026, the Rose Carleo Band undertook their debut international concert tour, performing a series of shows across Japan. Following their return, the band released the studio album 42 Days in May 2026 through Checked Label Services, with Carleo saying, "This record comes from a deeply personal place. It's about navigating life's challenges, finding strength in the struggle and coming out the other side with clarity and purpose." The record debuted at No. 2 on the ARIA Australian Rock Albums Chart and entered the main ARIA Top 50 Albums Chart at No. 34.

== Discography ==
=== Studio albums ===
Title	Album details	Peak chart positions	
Title	Album details	AUS	AUS Rock
Everything I Need	Released: July 2007; Label: Rose Carleo Music (RC); Formats: CD	—	—
Life Gets in the Way	Released: 2010; Label: Rose Carleo Music (RC); Formats: CD, digital download	—	—
Time Is Now	Released: March 2015; Label: WJO Distribution; Formats: CD, digital download	38	—
42 Days (as Rose Carleo Band)	Released: 15 May 2026; Label: Checked Label Services (CLS); Formats: CD, LP, digital download	34	2
"—" denotes a recording that did not chart or was not released in that territory.

=== Extended plays ===
Title	EP details
Rose Carleo	Released: 2006; Label: Rose Carleo Music (RC); Formats: CD
Reach Out (with Michael Fix)	Released: 2008; Label: Rose Carleo Music (RC); Formats: CD
Battle Scars (as Rose Carleo Band)	Released: April 2018; Label: RCB; Formats: CD, digital download

=== Singles ===
==== As lead artist ====
- "Sometimes You Just Know" (with Drew McAlister) (2007)
- "That Season Again" (2010)
- "Battle Scars" (2018) (with Rose Carleo Band)
- "Faded Tattoo" (2018) (with Rose Carleo Band)
- "Hell Ain't a Bad Place to Be" (2022) (with Rose Carleo Band)
- "Line 'Em Up" (2023) (with Rose Carleo Band)
- "Daisy's Song" (2025) (with Rose Carleo Band)
- "Son of God" (2026) (with Rose Carleo Band)
- "42 Days" (2026) (with Rose Carleo Band)
- "Dirt Bound" (featuring Pontus Snibb) (2026) (with Rose Carleo Band)

==== As featured artist ====
- "Falling Head First" (Rogue Sharks featuring Rose Carleo) (2022)[17]
- "Living Loving Maid" (The Filthy Animals featuring Rose Carleo) (2026)[18]
- * "Sure Know Something" (The Filthy Animals featuring Rose Carleo) (2026)
- "The Flame" (The Filthy Animals featuring Rose Carleo) (2026)
