= J-Milla =

Australian musician

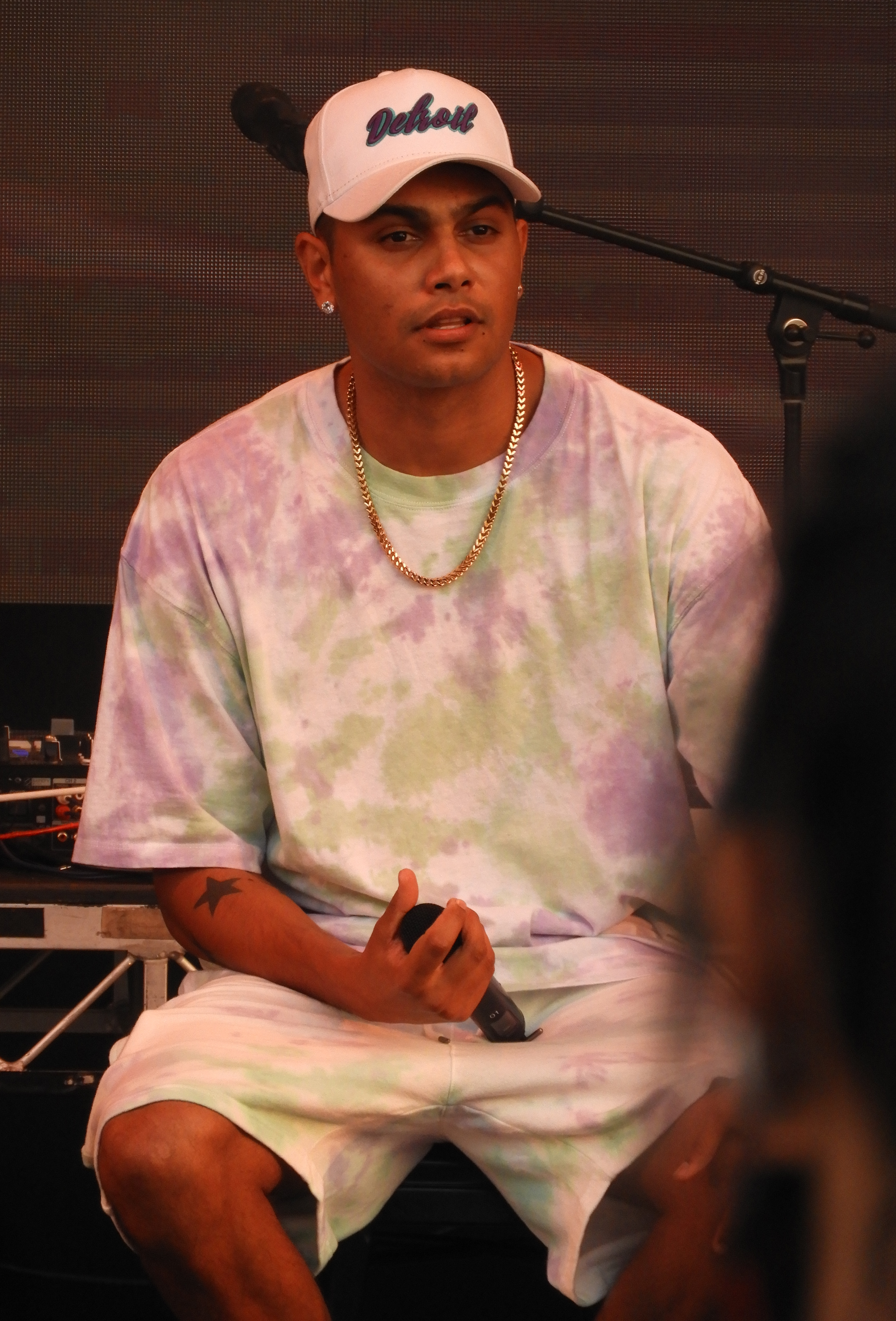
- At the 2021 Adelaide Festival
- Born: Jacob Nichaloff; Darwin, Northern Territory, Australia
- Occupation: Rapper
- Years active: 2018–present
- Known for: "Ball and Chain" (2022)

J-Milla, often styled J-MILLA, is an Aboriginal Australian hip hop musician . He was born as Jacob Nichaloff in Darwin in the Northern Territory.

== Early life and education ==
J-Milla was born in Darwin as Jacob Nichaloff, and is of the Marranunggu people of the Litchfield Park area in the Northern Territory (NT). He spent his childhood in Darwin (where he started rapping at the age of 11), but came to Adelaide, South Australia, to attend Scotch College, at the age of 12. His brother is hip hop musician Yung Milla.

== Career ==
J-Milla started releasing rap videos on social media when he was around 18, which built a large following.

His first single, "My People", was released in 2018.

In 2020, J-Milla pledged to donate the earnings from his single "Unlock the System" to the family of Kumanjayi Walker, an Aboriginal man who was killed during an arrest attempt. The song was strongly supported by the ABC radio station Triple J. In November 2020, he performed at the TREATY festival as part of NAIDOC Week at Tandanya in Adelaide, along with Dem Mob, MLRN x RKM, and shared the MC duties with actor Natasha Wanganeen. J-Milla was selected for TikTok's online music festival that year.

He performed on the closing day of the Adelaide Festival in March 2021, at an event called "Hip Hop Finale", along with Ziggy Ramo, JK-47 and Jimblah.

On Saturday 16 November 2024 J-Milla performed at the After Race Concert of the Adelaide 500 motor racing event in Adelaide. It was the biggest show so far for him, and he showcased unreleased work. Others performing that night were Crowded House and Meg Mac.

Some of his music, deals with problems affecting Aboriginal Australians, such as intergenerational trauma and reconciliation.

== Other activities ==
J-Milla works with Aboriginal children in remote communities, teaching songwriting at schools and helping the children to express their emotions in music. He also does workshops on domestic violence and mental health.

== Personal life ==
As of October 2024 J-Milla is married with two children and lives in Adelaide.

== Awards and nominations ==
The National Indigenous Music Awards is an annual awards ceremony that recognises the achievements of Indigenous Australians in music. The award ceremony commenced in 2004.

Year	Nominee / work	Award	Result	Ref.
2022	"Ball and Chain" (with Xavier Rudd)	Song of the Year	Nominated	

== Discography ==
=== Singles ===
List of singles, with year released and album name shown
Title	Year	Album
"My People"	2018	Non-album singles
"Juice"	2019	Non-album singles
"No Lie"	2019	Non-album singles
"Lately"	2019	Non-album singles
"Route 66"	2019	Non-album singles
"Unlock the System"	2020	Non-album singles
"Fresh"	2020	Non-album singles
"60K+"	2020	Non-album singles
"Lit" (with Tha Trigger, Mark Lyrik & Yully)	2020	Non-album singles
"Thang for Me"	2021	Non-album singles
"Ball and Chain" (with Xavier Rudd)	2022	Non-album singles
"Nicest" (with Their[13]teen)	2023	Non-album singles
"On My Soul"	2023	Non-album singles
"Gammon"	2023	Non-album singles
"Boomerang"	2024	Non-album singles
"All My Life"	2025	
