= Swimming stroke =

Style of body motion in swimming

Human swimming typically consists of repeating a specific body motion or swimming stroke to propel the body forward. There are many kinds of strokes, each defining a different swimming style or crawl.

In high school, collegiate, and Olympic swimming, there are two undulating strokes (breaststroke and butterfly stroke) and two alternating strokes (front crawl and backstroke).

Most strokes involve rhythmic and coordinated movements of all major body parts — torso, arms, legs, hands, feet, and head. Breathing typically must be synchronized with the strokes, too. It is possible, however, to swim by moving only legs without arms or only arms without legs; such strokes may be used for special purposes, for training or exercise, or by amputees and paralytics, such as Paralympians.

== Swimming styles ==
Within a competitive sense particularly, swim stroke techniques are continuously changing to become either easier or more efficient as more people explore the activity.

- Front crawl: the fastest style for swimming on the surface. Done while face down. The arms alternate while the legs perform a flutter kick.
  - Dolphin crawl: Similar to front crawl, but with a dolphin kick. One kick per arm or two kicks per cycle. This style is often used in training.
  - Catch up stroke: A variation of the front crawl where one arm always rests at the front while the other arm performs one cycle. This can also be used as a drill when training in competitive swimming.
  - Head-high crawl (also known as the water polo stroke, lifeguard approach stroke, or Tarzan drill): This stroke is used for water polo, lifeguards to keep the victim in sight, or those who simply want to see where they're going and breathe with ease. It is similar to front crawl, but with head above the water. This can also be used as a drill when training in competitive swimming.
- Trudgen: The trudgen is similar to the front crawl, except that it is paired with a scissors kick, similar to that used in the sidestroke.
  - Trudgen crawl: Similar to the trudgen, but with the use of a flutter kick (up and down leg kick) between the scissors kicks.
  - Double trudgen: Similar to the trudgen, but the sides of the scissors kick alternate.
  - Double trudgen crawl: Similar to the double trudgen, but with a flutter kick between the scissors kick alternate.
- Butterfly stroke: performed face down in the water. The legs perform a dolphin kick while the arms move in a forward circle at the same time.
  - Slow butterfly (also known as "moth stroke"): Similar to butterfly, but with an extended gliding phase, Breathing during the pull/push phase, return head into the water during recovery. This style uses two kicks per cycle.
- Breaststroke: performed face down in the water without rotating the torso. The arms stay in the water and move synchronously, while the legs perform a whip kick (which is sometimes called a breaststroke kick). It is possible to keep the head elevated out of the water throughout the stroke, although the head usually dips in and out.
  - Inverted breaststroke: Similar to elementary backstroke, but with a whip kick and arm motions.
- Backstroke (Back crawl): Done while lying on the back. One arm reaches behind the head with a fingertip entry while the other arm is by the side. The legs perform a flutter kick.
  - Elementary backstroke: Both arms move synchronized (They begin out like an airplane, then go beside the body like a soldier then they run up the sides and back out to an airplane position) with whip kick.
  - Inverted butterfly: Similar to elementary backstroke, but with a dolphin kick. This is often used for training.
  - Back double trudgen: Similar to the backstroke, but with a scissors kick to alternating sides.
  - Old English Backstroke : Lying on back, breaststroke legs and butterfly arms
- Sidestroke: On the side, pull the water as if with a rope with arms going out and stopping in the middle while ensuring that the strokes are most hydrodynamic when moving towards the desired location, and pushing the most water when moving away from the location. In addition, the legs are performing a scissors kick, which is like whip kick, but sideways.
  - Lifesaving stroke: Similar to the side stroke, but only the bottom arm moves while the top arm tows a swimmer in distress.
  - Combat sidestroke: This stroke was developed and used by the United States Navy SEALs and is designed to be more efficient and reduce profile in the water.
- Composite stroke is drill stroke within one basic stroke, ins (for example, Front crawl flutter/scissor Dolphin/Dolphin flutter) or between two basic stroke, weens (Over arm 1 Arm Lead Sidestroke to 2 Arms Lead Dolphin). It is a strength and stamina training technique.
- Dog paddle: face over water and paddling with alternate hands, often with the nose and mouth above the water. This stroke can be used in reverse to propel the body feet first.
- Survival travel stroke: Alternating underwater arm stroke, one cycle for propulsion, one for a lift to stay on the surface. This style is slow but sustainable.
- Breast feet first strokes: With legs extended, use the arms with a pushing, flapping, clapping or uplifting motion.
- Snorkeling: Swimming on the breast using a snorkel, usually in combination with masks and fins. Any stroke on the breast can be used, and there is no need to lift or turn the head for breathing.
- Finswimming is the progression of a swimmer using fins either on the water surface or underwater. Finswimming is usually done on the breast.
- Flutter back finning: Symmetrically underwater arm recovery with flutter kick.
- Feet first swimming: A very slow stroke on the back where a breaststroke movement with the arms propels the body forward feet first. Also the arms can be lifted out of the water and pulled backwards together with a scooping movement. Alternatively, the arms can be raised behind the head, alternately or together pushing with the hands, propelling the body. Similarly, the hands can be brought together in a clapping action. These strokes are often used for training.
- Corkscrew swimming: Alternating between front crawl and backstroke every arm. This leads to a constant rotation of the swimmer. The stroke is used mainly for training purposes and is also sometimes known as Newfie Stroke, referring to Newfoundland. When rotating every third stroke, this is called waltz crawl.
- Gliding: The swimmer is stretched with the arms to the front, the head between the arms and the feet to the back. This streamlined shape minimizes resistance and allows the swimmer to glide, for example after a start, a push off from a wall, or to rest between strokes.
- Turtle stroke: On the breast, extend right arm then pull, after pushing with the left leg (while opposite limbs are recovering), then opposite limbs repeat this process, i. e. left arm pulls after right leg pushes. Uses muscles of the waist. Head can easily be above or below water: this is a slow but very sustainable stroke, common in turtles and newts.
- Open water swimming: Mostly freestyle stroke. Difference is that due to swimming in open water visibility will be an issue and every 4th or 6th stroke the head is slightly lifted upwards for visibility.

A study done by Barbosa Tiago M. called Energetics and biomechanics as determining factors of swimming performance: Updating the state of the art discusses the relationship between segmental kinematics and center of mass kinematics in competitive swimming, focusing on how stroke length (SL) and stroke frequency (SF) influence swimming velocity (v) and performance. Freestyle is the fastest stroke, followed by Butterfly, Backstroke, and Breaststroke, with performance variations depending on distance and stroke technique. A decline in velocity during a race is linked to a decrease in SL, with greater reliance on SF for speed when SL is short. High-level swimmers maintain higher and more stable spatial-temporal parameters, particularly in Freestyle, where SF variability is lower than in Backstroke. Across laps, both genders exhibit a “zig-zag” pattern in SF, peaking during the final lap, with this pattern being more pronounced in males and less variable among elite swimmers. A study done by Rejman Marek called Goggle-free swimming as autonomous water competence from the perspective of breath control on execution of a given distance explored adolescents’ ability to maintain breathing rhythm while swimming with and without goggles, emphasizing water competence over stroke techniques. Results showed that the absence of goggles negatively impacted breath control for both genders, with boys struggling more to swim effectively and safely. The study recommends incorporating goggle-free swimming into elementary education, focusing on simple forms of swimming for breath control training, and accounting for gender differences in visual perception and motor control during instruction.

== Special purpose styles ==
A number of strokes are only used for special purposes, e.g. to manipulate an object (a swimmer in distress, a ball), or just to stay afloat.

=== Underwater swimming ===
Swimming underwater is faster than swimming on the surface. Underwater swimming is not its own category in the Olympics, but in the 1988 Olympics several competitors swam much of the backstroke race underwater. After that, the Olympics created a rule that swimmers are only allowed to stay underwater for the first 10 meters (later changed to 15 meters) after a start or a turn.

Any style with underwater recovery can be done underwater for certain distances depending on the need for air. Underwater swimming on the back has the additional problem of water entering the nose. To avoid this, the swimmer can breathe out through the nose or wear a nose clip. Some swimmers can close their nostrils with the upper lip or with the compressor naris muscles.

- Dolphin kick: The feet kick up and down, while pressed together. This is the style that is usually used at the beginning of the race, to hold on to the speed the swimmer generates by pushing off the walls at the start and the turns. When it is used for underwater swimming, the arms are usually extended in front of the head, keeping still with the hands together.
- Fish kick: Similar to the dolphin kick, but performed while on the swimmer's side. This may be the fastest form of swimming. Swimming creates vortices which propel the swimmer forward. In the dolphin kick, the vortices go up and down, where they're disturbed when they hit the surface of the water or the bottom of the pool. But with the fish kick, they go sideways, where there are no obstructions.
- Pull-down Breaststroke: most common swim stroke underwater as it requires very low energy. Main application is for dynamic apnea (DNF)
- Sea lion stroke: based on the swimming style of sea lions, this swimming stroke is primarily performed with sculling, arms at the side along the bodyline and strongly supported with flutter kicks in a contralateral sequence. It is very effective when swimming through narrow underwater places.

=== Lifesaving strokes ===
- Lifesaving stroke: Similar to the side stroke, but only the bottom arm moves while the top arm tows a swimmer in distress.
- Lifesaving approach stroke (also known as head-up front crawl or Tarzan stroke): Similar to the front crawl, but with the eyes to the front above the water level, such as to observe the surroundings as for example a swimmer in distress or a ball.
- Pushing rescue stroke: This stroke helps to assist a tired swimmer: The tired swimmer lies on the back and the rescuer swims a whip kick and pushes against the soles of the tired swimmer (not taught or recognized by the RLSS body governing UK lifeguarding).
- Pulling rescue stroke: This stroke helps to assist a swimmer in distress. Both swimmers lie on the back, and the rescuer grabs the armpits of the swimmer in distress and performs a whip kick (on the back) for forwarding motion. The kick has to be not too shallow as otherwise the victim will be hit.
- Extended Arm Tow (unconscious victim): swimming sidestroke or breaststroke on their back, the rescuer holds the head with a straight arm, the hand cupping underneath the chin, and ensures that the mouth and nose are out of the water.
- Arm Tow: the rescuer swims sidestroke, behind the casualty holds the upper right arm of a casualty with their left hand or vice versa, lifting the casualty out of the water.
- Vice Grip Turn and Trawl: used on a victim with a suspected spinal injury. The lifeguard approaches slowly to the victim (who is usually face down in water), places one hand on the victim's chin, with arm pressed firmly against the victim's chest. The other hand is placed on the back of the victim's head with the arm down the victim's back. Both arms press together (like a vice), and the lifeguard uses his feet to begin moving forward and then rolls under the victim to come up alongside her or him, but with the victim now on his or her back. (This is one of the hardest lifesaving maneuvers, as the grip must be perfect on the first attempt; otherwise, the victim may be given further spinal damage, such as paralysis.)
- Clothes swimming: The swimmer is wearing clothes that restrict movement when wet, i.e. almost all clothes. This is done to practice situations where the swimmer fell in the water dressed or the rescuer did not have time to undress. Due to the restricted movement and the weight of wet clothes out of the water, overarm recovery is harder, which makes a style with underwater recovery, like the breaststroke, the better option.
- Rescue tube swimming: The lifeguard pulls a flotation device, which is pushed forward when approaching the victim.

=== Without forward motion ===
- Survival floating (also known as dead man float and drownproofing): Lying on the prone (face down in water) with minimal leg movement, and staying afloat with the natural buoyancy. Lift the head to breathe only then back to floating. This style is only to stay afloat and to rest.
- Back floating: Similar to the survival floating, except on the back.
- Treading water: The swimmer is in the water head up and feet down. Different kicks, such as the whip kick or eggbeater kick, and hand movements (Sculling) are used to stay afloat. This is useful to keep the head out of the water for a better view or to catch an object as for example in water polo. In addition, treading water is used in training by competitive swimmers in order to build up the strength of the kick; butterfly or scissors kick are most common when training vertically.
- Sculling: This is a figure 8 movement of the hands for forward motion or upward lift. Used in surf lifesaving, water polo, synchronized swimming and treading water.
- Turtle float: The knees are raised to the chest and encircled by the arms.
- Jellyfish float: Holding the ankles with the hands.
- Head first surface dive
- Foot first surface dive
- Pencil float

== See also ==
- Paralympic swimming
- Composite stroke
- Stunt swimming
- Total Immersion (swimming instruction technique)
- Turn (swimming)
