= Dog paddle =

Swimming style

A Golden Retriever swimming the doggy paddle

The dog paddle or doggy paddle is a simple swimming style. It is characterized by the swimmer lying on their chest and moving their hands and legs alternately in a manner reminiscent of how dogs and other quadrupedal mammals swim. It is effectively a "trot" in water, instead of land.

It was the first swimming stroke used by ancient humans, believed to have been learned by observing animals swim. Prehistoric cave paintings in Egypt show figures doing what appears to be the dog paddle.

It is often the first swimming stroke used by young children when they are learning to swim.

The dog paddle has also been taught as a military swimming stroke when a silent stroke is needed - since neither arms nor legs break the surface.

== See also ==
- Human swimming
- Front crawl
- Breaststroke
