= United States Navy SEAL selection and training =

Special forces unit policy and procedures

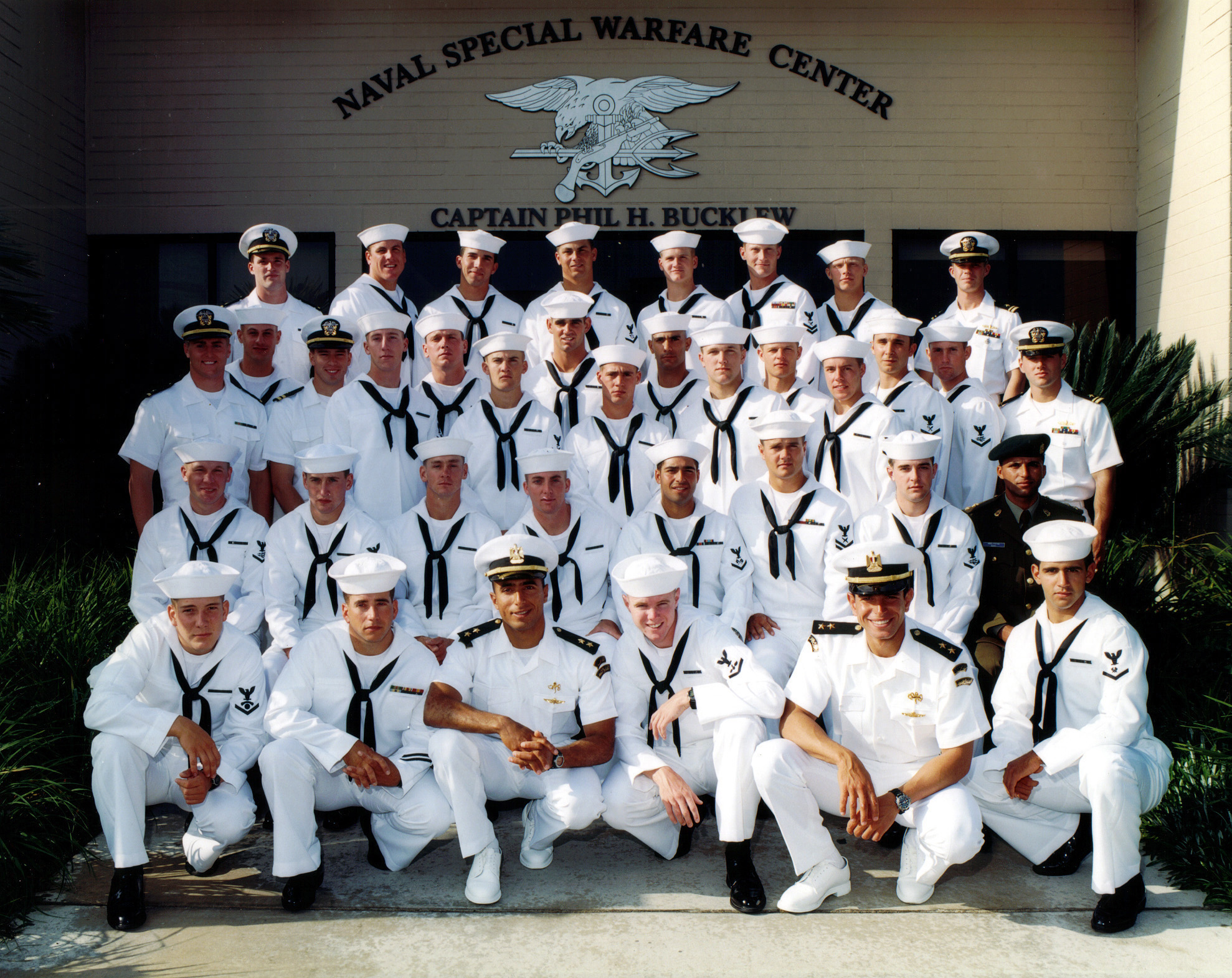
The graduating members of BUD/S Class 236 in front of the Naval Special Warfare Center. At the far left of the back row is Medal of Honor recipient Michael P. Murphy.

The average member of the United States Navy's Sea, Air, Land Teams (SEALs) spends over a year in a series of formal training environments before being awarded the Special Warfare Operator Naval Rating and the Navy Enlisted Classification (NEC) O26A Combatant Swimmer (SEAL) or, in the case of commissioned naval officers, the designation 113X Special Warfare Officer. All SEALs must attend and graduate from their rating's 24-week "A" School known as Basic Underwater Demolition/SEAL (BUD/S) school, a basic parachutist course and then the 26-week SEAL Qualification Training program.

Sailors entering the SEAL training pipeline who are chosen by Naval Special Warfare Command to become medics must also attend the six-month SEAL specific Special Operations Tactical Medic course in Stennis, Mississippi, and subsequently earn the NEC SO-5393 Naval Special Warfare Medic before joining an operational team. Once outside the formal schooling environment SEALs entering a new team at the beginning of an operational rotation can expect 18 months of training interspersed with leave and other time off before each six-month deployment.

== Screening ==
Rate of advancement from contacting recruiter
Pipeline phase	Success percent	Overall percent
Signed enlistment	79%	79%
Graduated recruit training	58%	45%
Completed SEAL pre-indoctrination	90%	41%
Completed SEAL indoctrination	85%	35%
Completed BUD/S phase 1	33%	11%
Completed BUD/S phase 2	87%	10%
Completed BUD/S phase 3	96%	10%
Graduated Airborne School	100%	10%
Completed SEAL Qualification Training	99%	9.5%

Training to become a Navy SEAL is voluntary, with officers and enlisted sailors training side by side. To volunteer, a SEAL candidate must be a US citizen between 18 and 29 years old in the U.S. Navy. Occasionally, personnel from foreign armed forces allied with the United States have been invited to train at BUD/S. For two years, of seven initially planned, members of the Coast Guard were allowed to obtain SEAL training, until the program was suspended in 2011. Waivers are available for 17-year-olds with parental permission, and case-by-case for 29- and 30-year-olds. Academically, all applicants must have the equivalent of a high school education, have a composite score of at least 220 on the ASVAB and be proficient in all aspects of the English language. Medically, all potential applicants must have at least 20/70 vision, correctable to 20/25, be able to pass the SEAL Physical Screening Test and have no recent history of drug abuse. Lastly applicants must have "good moral character" as determined by their history of criminal convictions and civil citations.

=== Women ===
Since December 2015, women have been eligible to enter the SEAL training pipeline provided they can meet the same acceptance guidelines as men. Women accepted into the program undergo the same training regimen as do the men, although this policy is under review.

The first woman to enter the training pipeline dropped out during the 3-week Indoctrination phase in August 2017 prior to entering BUD/S.

The first woman to complete the screening required to enter BUD/S did so in 2019. She was subsequently assigned to the unit listed as her first choice, which was not the SEALs.

The first woman to become a Special Warfare Combatant-craft Crewmen (SWCC) graduated from the Naval Special Warfare training pipeline on Thursday, July 15, 2021. She was among 17 graduates of the Crewman Qualification Training (CQT) class earning their pins.

=== Assessment ===
Assignment to BUD/S is conditional on the SEAL Physical Screening Test (PST). Prospective trainees are expected to exceed the minimums. The minimum requirements are 500 yd (460 m) swim using breast or combat sidestroke in under 12:30 with a competitive time of 10:30 or less, at least 42 push-ups in 2 minutes with a competitive count of 79 or more, at least 50 sit-ups in 2 minutes with a competitive count of 79 or more, at least 6 pull-ups from a dead hang (no time limit) with a competitive count of 11 or more, run 1.5 mi (2.4 km) in pants and boots (now changed to shorts and sneakers) under 11:00 with a competitive time of 10:20 or less.

== Naval Special Warfare Preparatory School (5 weeks) ==
The training curriculum begins at Naval Special Warfare Preparatory School in San Diego, CA. Here, aspiring SEALs are given a crash course in the physical standards required to even attempt to become a SEAL.

It starts with the initial Physical Screening Test and ends with a more demanding Modified Physical Screening Test, one that includes a minimum of 70 push-ups in 2 minutes, a timed four-mile run in 31 minutes, and a timed 1,000-meter swim with fins in 20 minutes. The goal is to increase the SEAL candidates' physical readiness between the two tests so that they are ready to move on to Basic Underwater Demolition/SEAL (BUD/S) Training. Those unable to pass the final modified PST test are removed from the SEAL training pipeline and reclassified into other jobs in the Navy.

== Basic Underwater Demolition/SEAL (BUD/S) Training (24 weeks) ==
BUD/S is a 24-week training course that develops the SEAL candidates' mental and physical stamina and leadership skills. Each BUD/S phase includes timed physical condition tests, with the time requirements becoming more demanding each week. BUD/S consists of a three-week orientation followed by three phases, covering physical conditioning (seven weeks), combat diving (seven weeks), and land warfare (seven weeks) respectively. Officer and enlisted personnel go through the same training program. It is designed to develop and test their stamina, leadership, and ability to work as a team. BUD/S has been controversial due to candidates' use of performance-enhancing drugs and a number of candidate deaths.

=== Pre-BUD/S or BUD/S Orientation (3 weeks) ===
Pre-BUD/S or BUD/S Orientation, previously known as Indoctrination (Indoc), is a three-week course that introduces candidates to the Naval Special Warfare Center and the BUD/S lifestyle. Navy SEAL instructors introduce candidates to BUD/S physical training, the obstacle course, swimming and other unique training aspects. This part of training is designed to prepare candidates for day one of First Phase.

=== Phase 1: Physical conditioning (7 weeks) ===
The first phase of BUD/S assesses SEAL candidates in physical conditioning, water competency, teamwork, and mental tenacity.

Physical conditioning phase utilizes daily running, swimming, calisthenics, and grows harder as the weeks progress. Candidates are also divided into "boat crews" consisting of six to seven people with one small inflatable boat known as an IBS, and must paddle out from the shore, through the surf zone, and back again. Candidates participate in weekly 4-mile (6.4 km) timed runs in shorts and sneakers (previously in boots and pants) and timed obstacle courses, swim distances up to two miles wearing fins in the ocean and learn small boat seamanship. Candidates that consistently do not meet specified time requirements for running and swimming tests are dropped from training. The first three weeks of basic conditioning phase prepares candidates for the fourth week, known as "Hell Week". During Hell Week, candidates participate in five and a half days of continuous training. Each candidate sleeps at most four hours during the entire week, runs more than 200 miles (320 km), and does physical training for more than 20 hours per day. Candidates are not restricted from meals and are fed breakfast, lunch and dinner. The remaining three weeks involve the acquisition of various methods of conducting hydrographic surveys and creating a hydrographic chart while still participating in timed runs and swim tests.

Because of its particularly challenging requirements, many candidates begin questioning their decision to come to BUD/S during First Phase, with a significant number deciding to Drop on Request (DOR). The tradition of DOR consists of dropping one's helmet liner next to a pole with a brass ship's bell attached to it and ringing the bell three times.

On 4 February 2022, shortly after completing the fourth week of training, also known as "Hell Week", two sailors began to "complain of symptoms" and were immediately taken to a local hospital. One sailor was pronounced dead after arriving, though no cause of death was reported. The second sailor was admitted in stable condition, but there was no cause of apparent illness or injury that was reported.

=== Phase 2: Combat diving (7 weeks) ===
The diving phase of BUD/S training develops and qualifies SEAL candidates as competent basic combat swimmers. During this period, physical training continues and becomes even more intensive. This second phase concentrates on dive physics, underwater skills, and combat SCUBA. Candidates will learn two types of SCUBA: open circuit (compressed air) and closed circuit. Also, basic dive medicine and medical skills training is provided.

Emphasis is placed on long-distance underwater dives with the goal of training students to become basic combat divers, using swimming and diving techniques as a means of transportation from their launch point to their combat objective. This is what separates SEALs from all other US Special Operations Forces. By the end of Second Phase, candidates must complete timed 2-mile swim with fins in 80 minutes, the 4-mile run with boots in 31 minutes, a 3.5-mile and 5.5-mile swim.

Successful Second Phase Candidates demonstrate a high level of comfort in the water and the ability to perform in stressful and often uncomfortable environments.

=== Phase 3: Land warfare (7 weeks) ===
The land warfare phase teaches the class basic weapons, demolitions, land navigation, patrolling, rappelling, marksmanship, infantry tactics, and small-unit tactics. During the third phase, the class is taught to gather and process information that will complete the overall mission. There is more classroom work that teaches map, compass, land navigation, and basic weapon skill sets. These skill-sets allow the class to transition from having novice skills to becoming more comfortable out in the field. Most of this training is new to the class, and the learning pace becomes faster and faster.

For the final five weeks of training, the class goes offshore, about 60 miles (97 km) from Coronado to San Clemente Island. On the island, the class practices the skills they learned in the third phase. The days become longer and more work-intensive, set to mirror the work hours spent in the field. Many students view this as one of the hardest parts of training, as training is conducted seven days a week, with very minimal sleep, all while handling live explosives and ammunition. Interaction with instructors is also never-ending, and punishments are at their harshest levels yet. By the end of the Third Phase, candidates must complete a timed 2-mile ocean swim with fins in 75 minutes, a 4-mile timed run with boots in 30 minutes and a 14-mile (23 km) run.

BUD/S Training
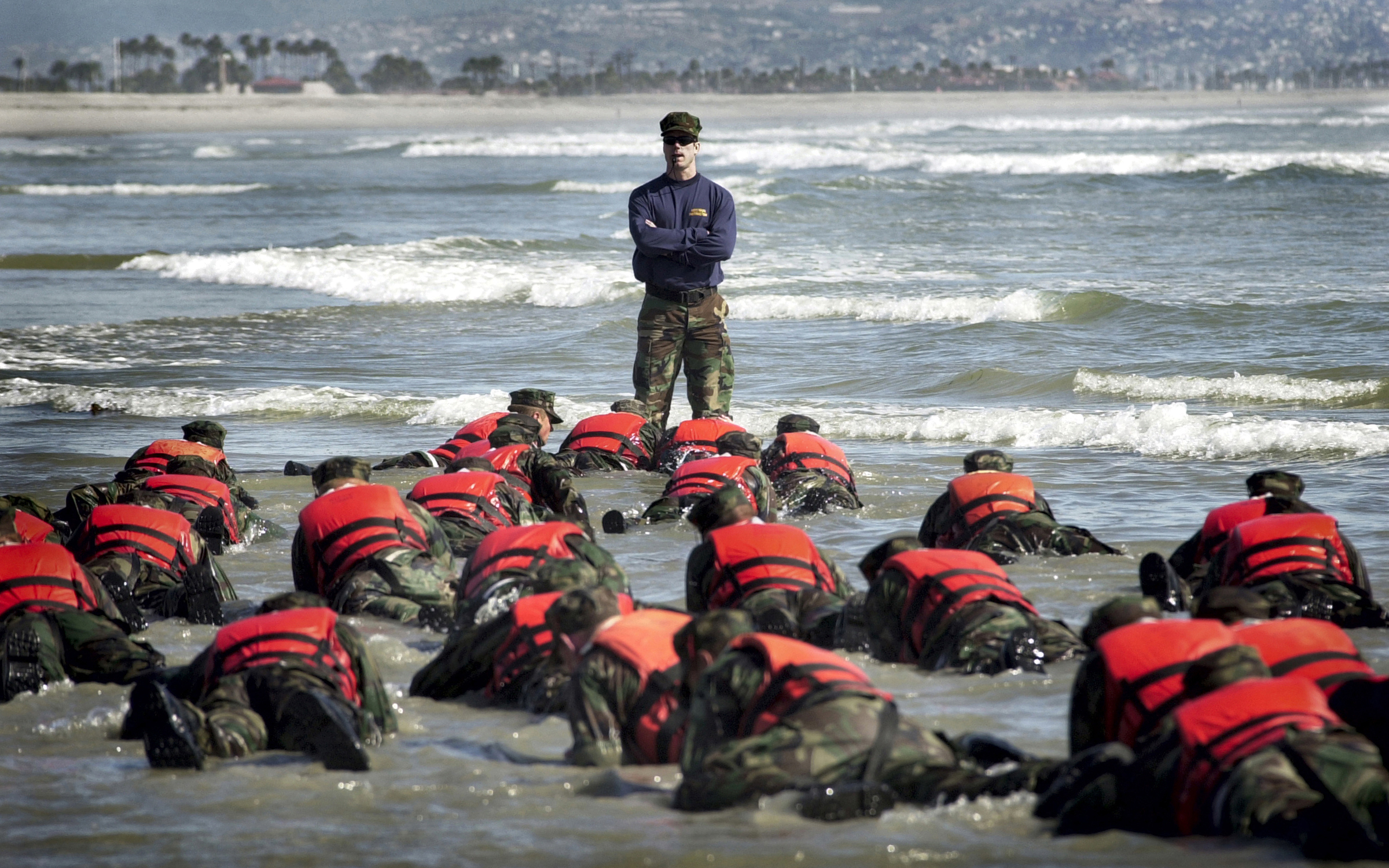
First Phase A Navy SEAL Instructor in Class 245 provides a lesson to his trainees on listening to instruction.

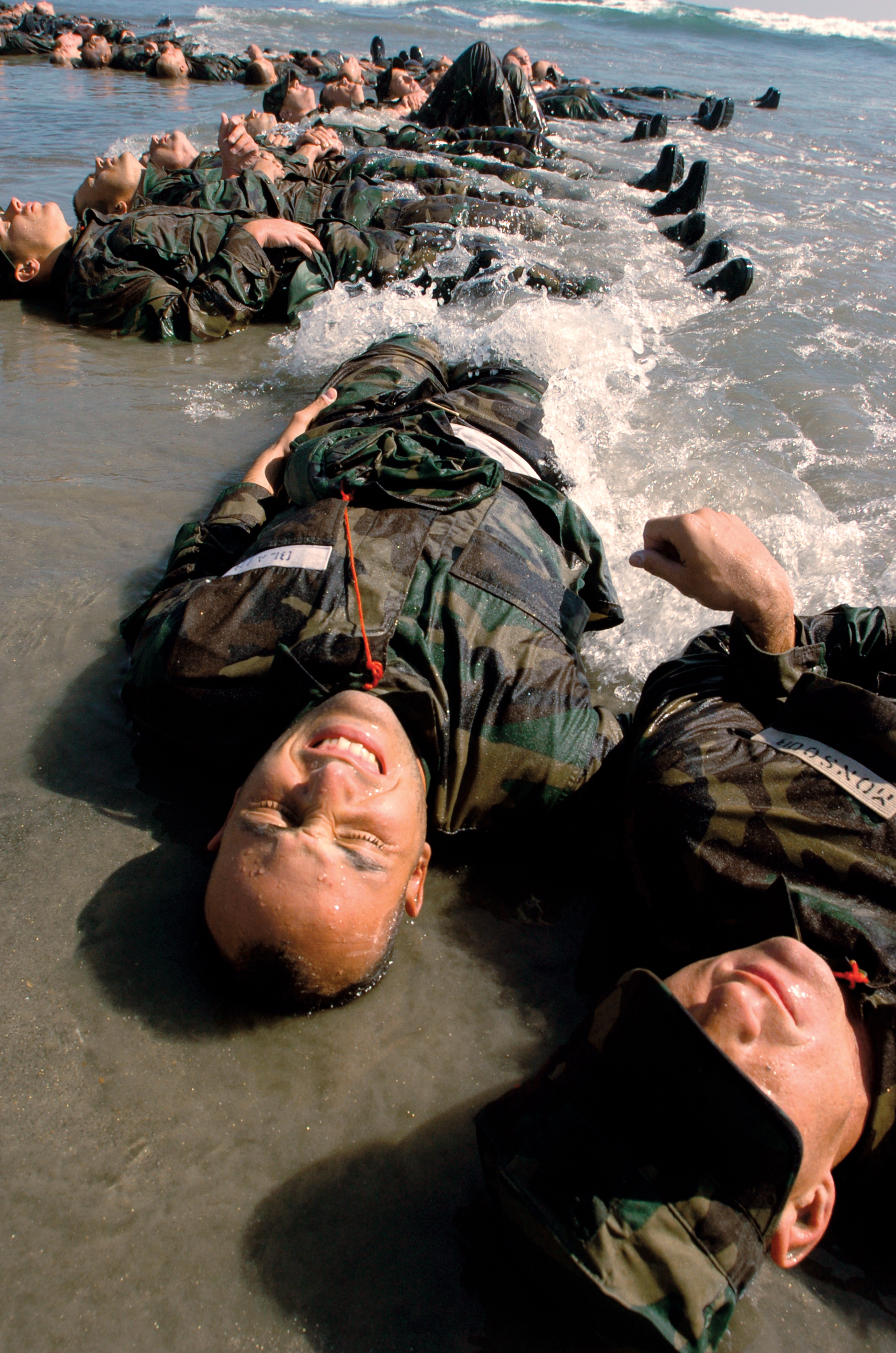
First Phase Trainees endure surf torture. Future Medal of Honor recipient Michael Monsoor is shown in the lower right corner.

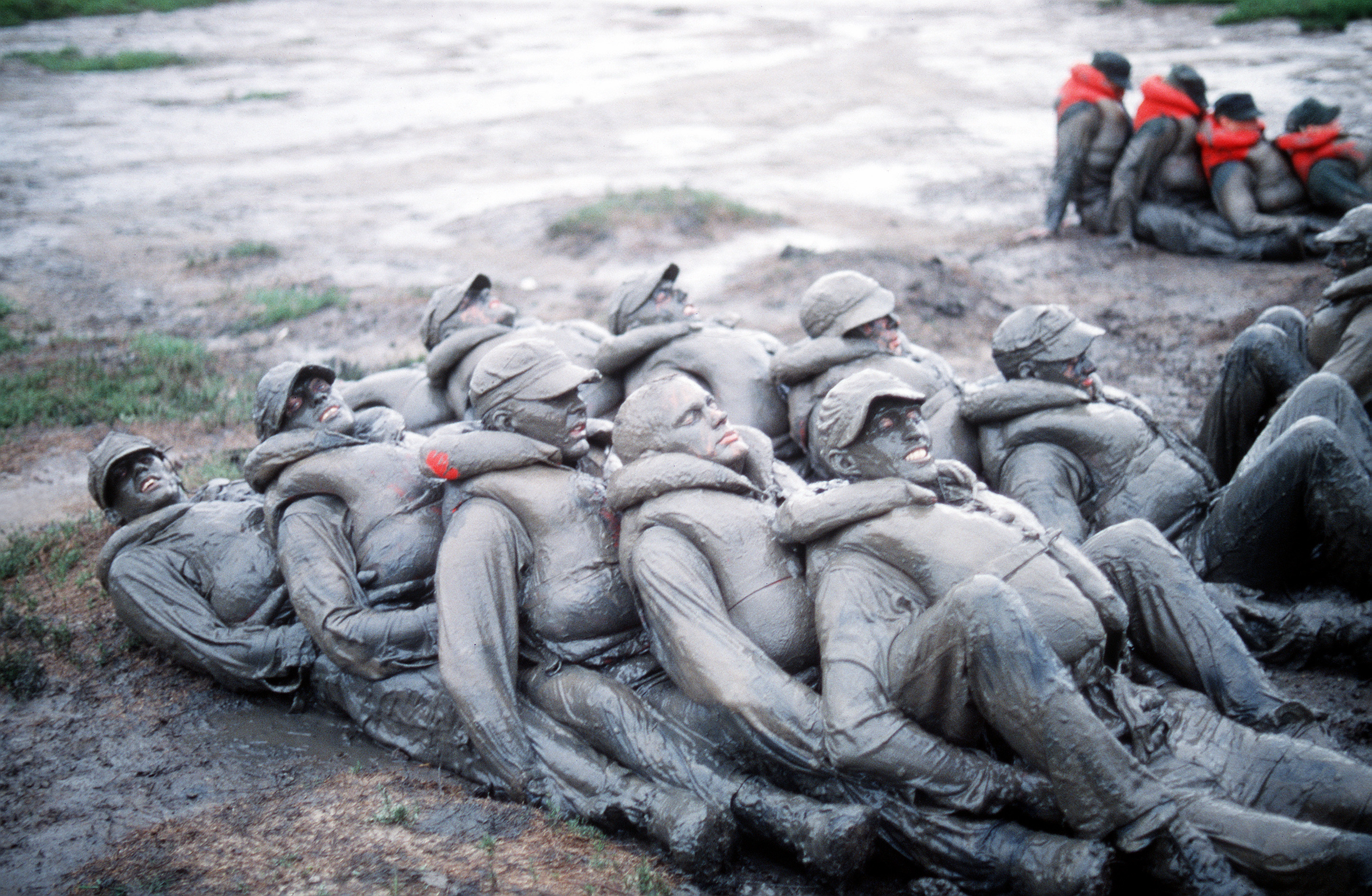
First Phase Trainees covered in mud.

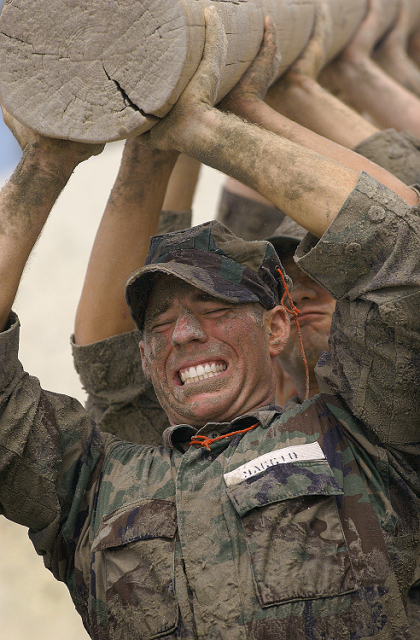
First Phase Team focused physical training with telephone pole sized logs is common (largest is nicknamed “Old Misery”). This log exercise is an inheritance from the British Commando training used during the formation in Britain of the U. S. Navy’s UDTs during World War II. These were the precursors of the SEAL teams.

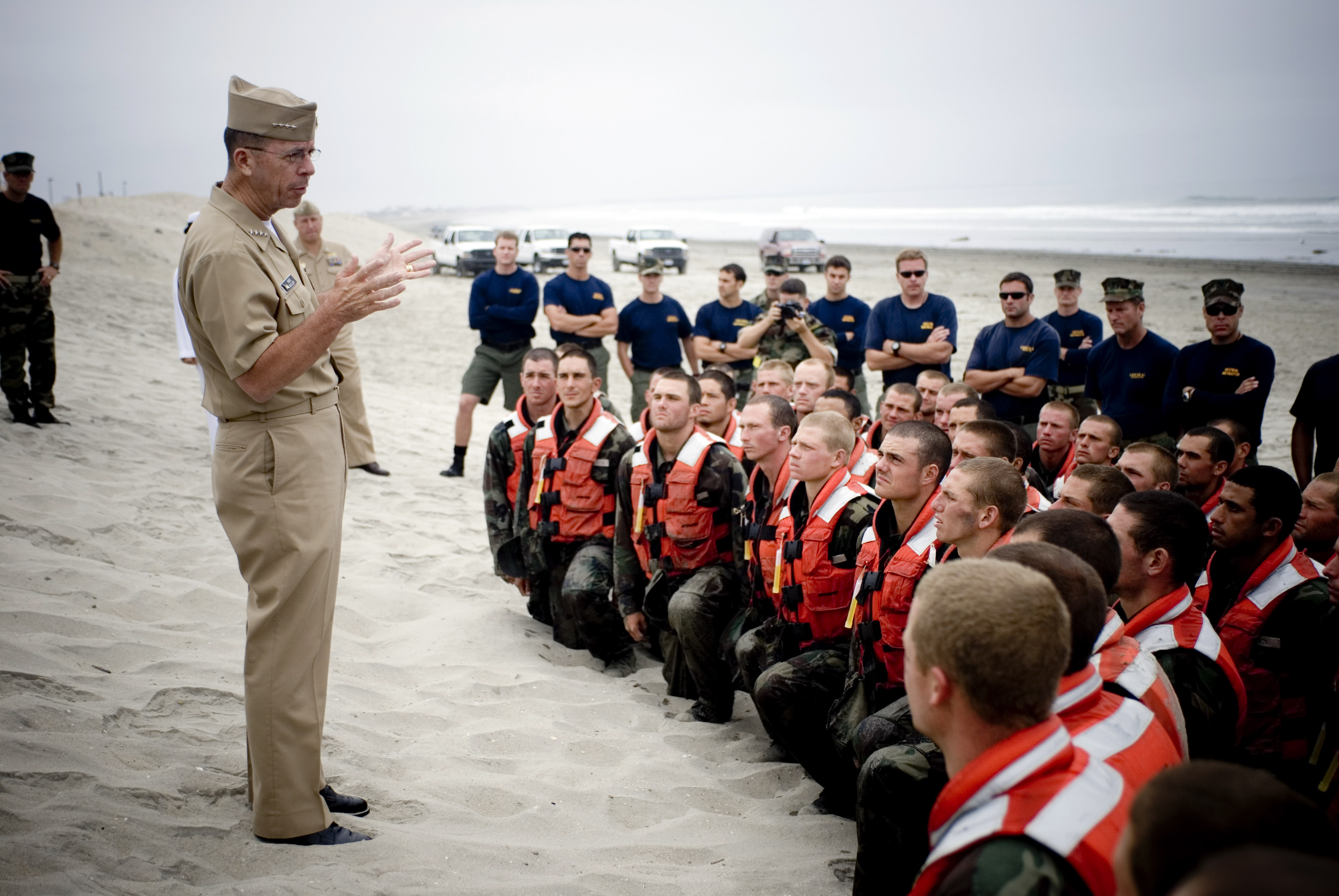
First Phase Then-Chief of Naval Operations (CNO) Adm. Mike Mullen addresses the remaining trainees of Class 266 at the end of "Hell Week."

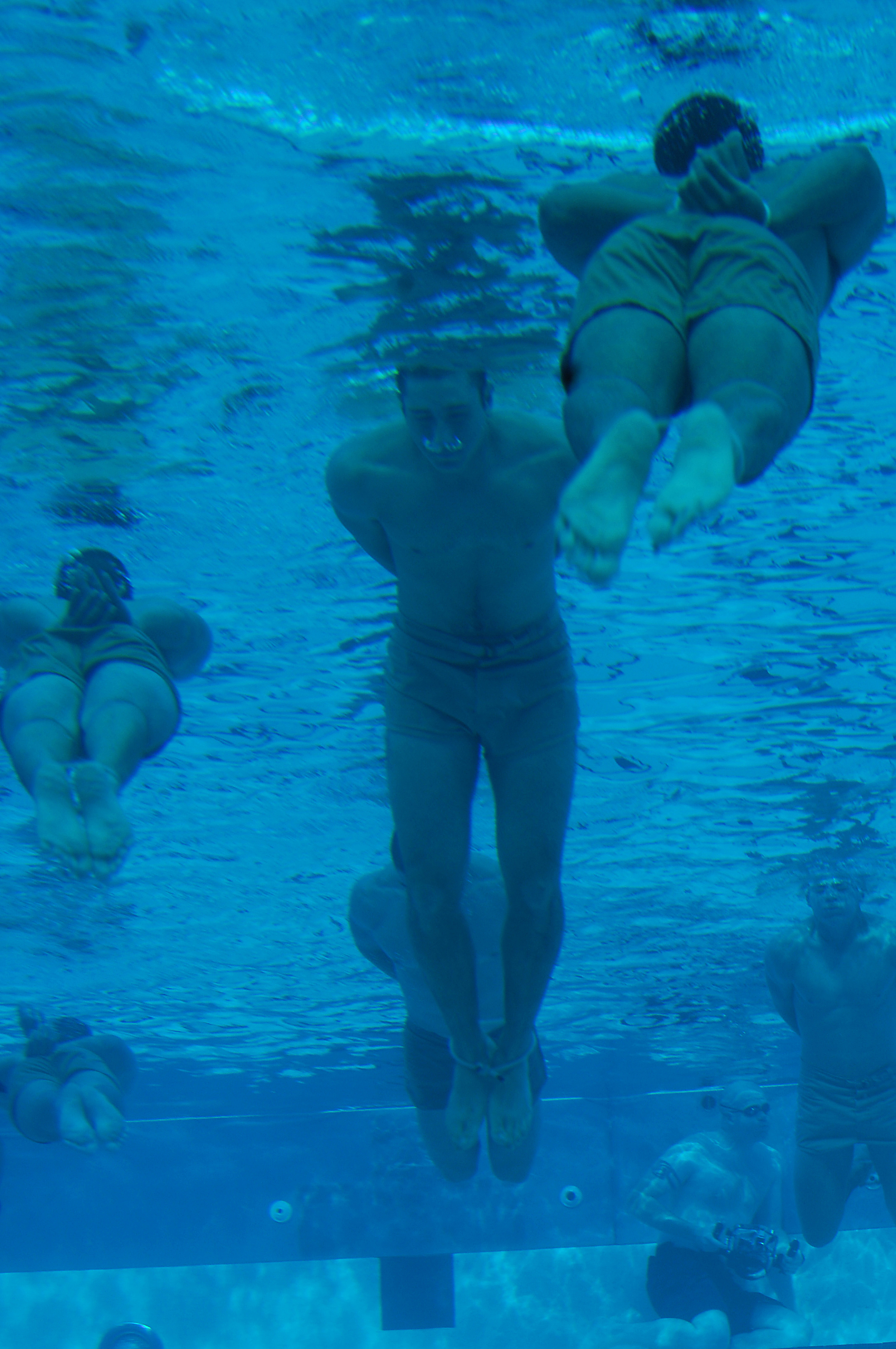
First Phase Trainees have their arms and legs tied as a part of "drown proofing" training.

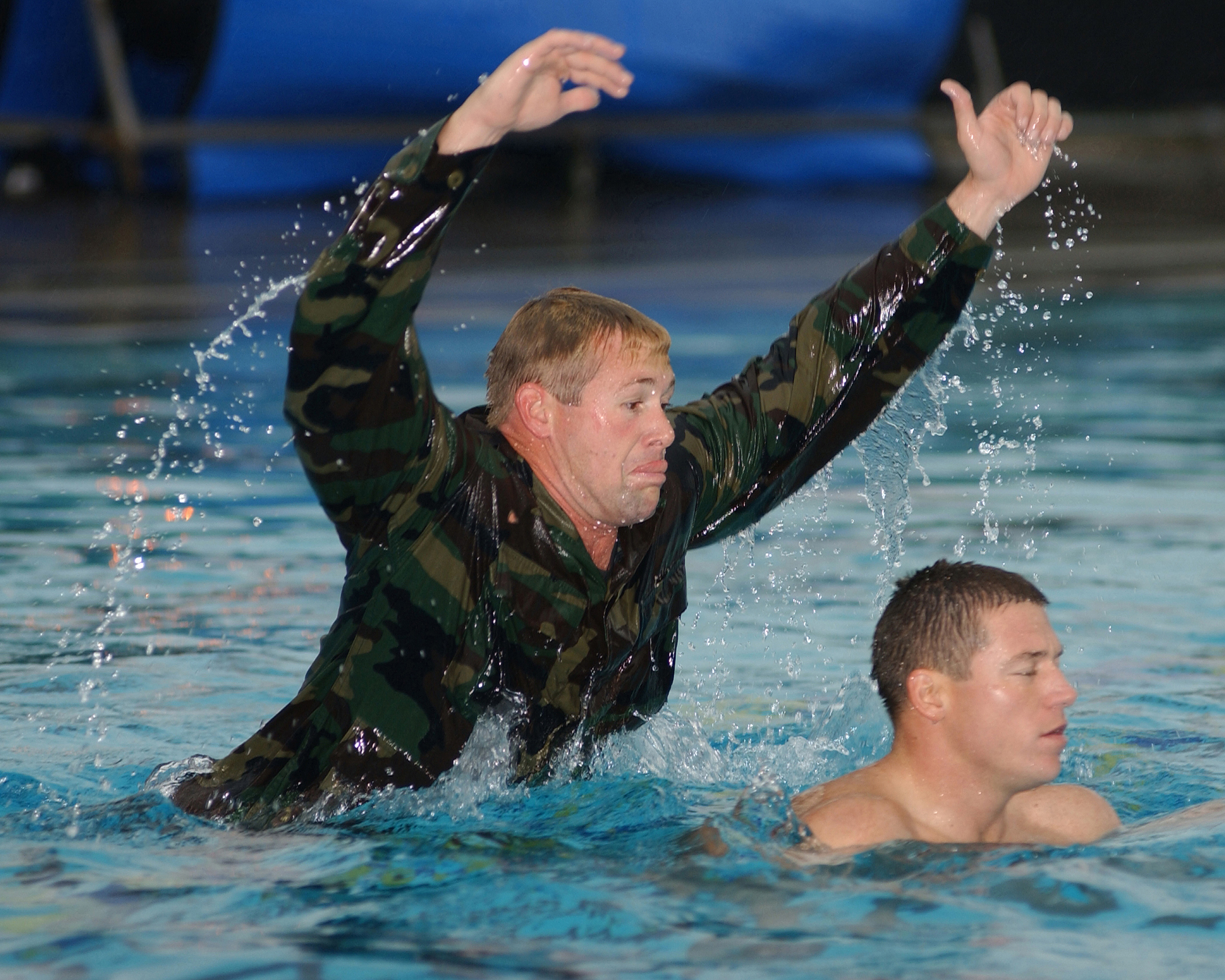
Second Phase A BUD/S instructor attacks a trainee in the pool to simulate a combative drowning victim.

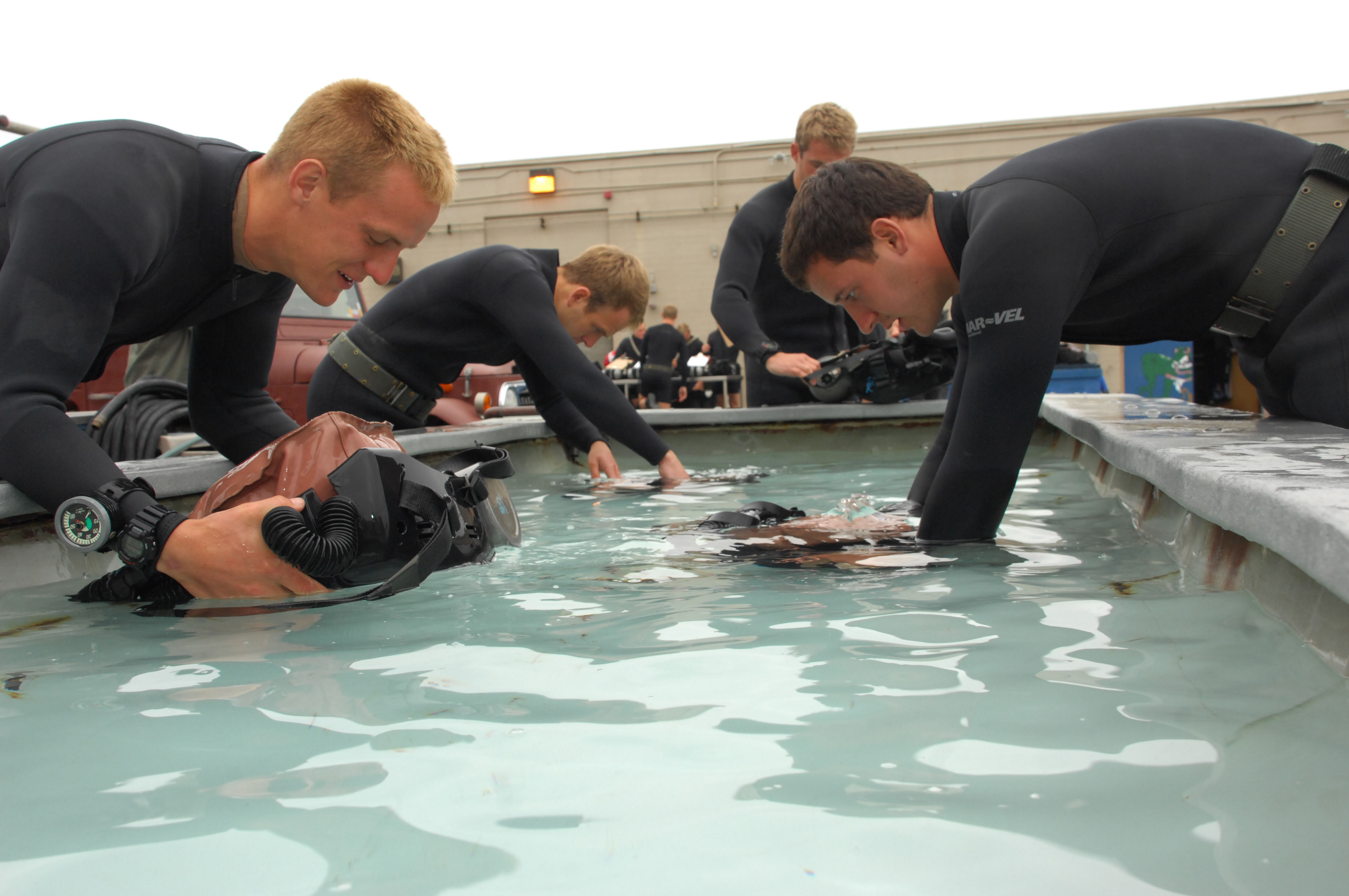
Second Phase Students do a safety check on their gear before making a dive.

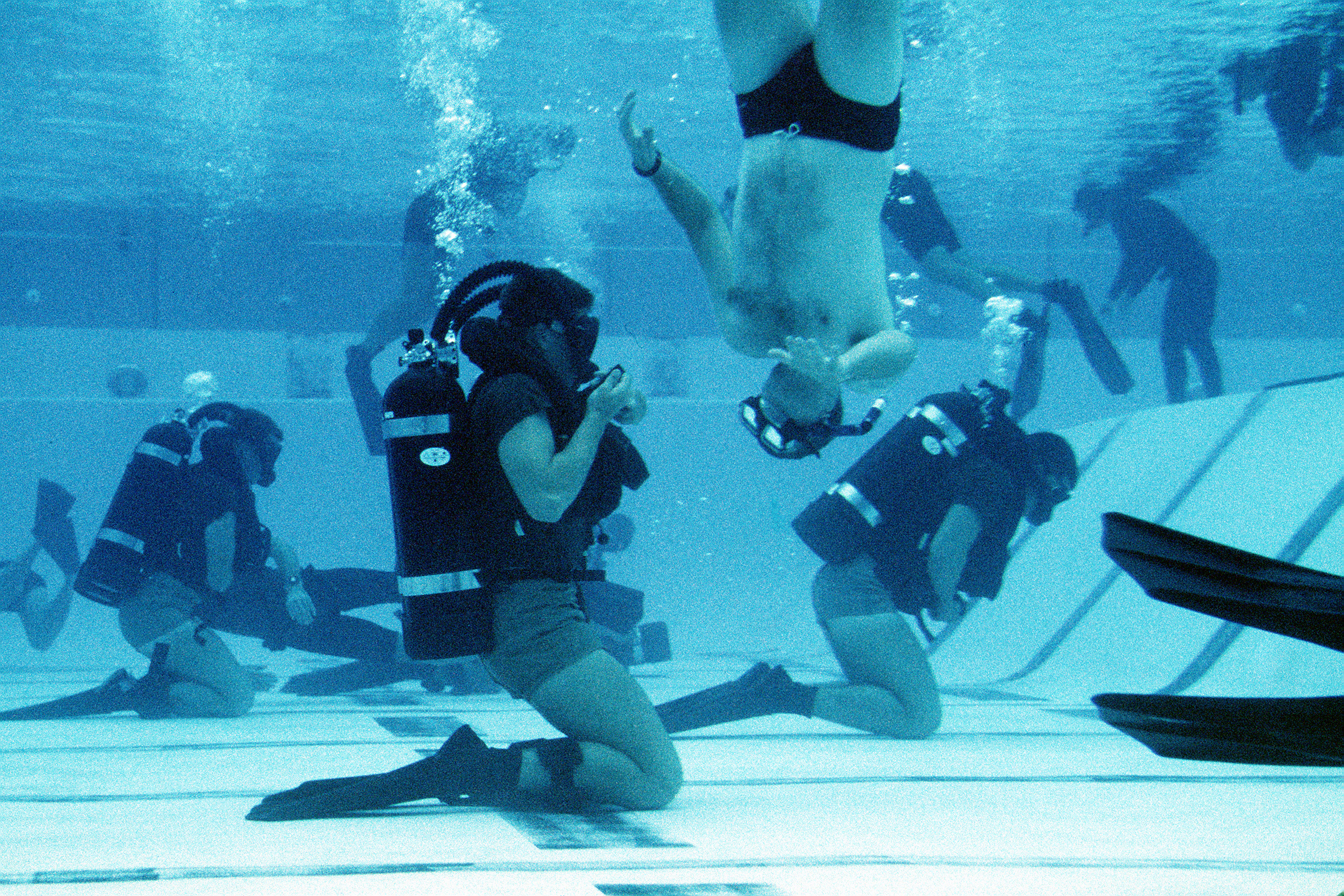
Second Phase Trainees start diving in the pool.

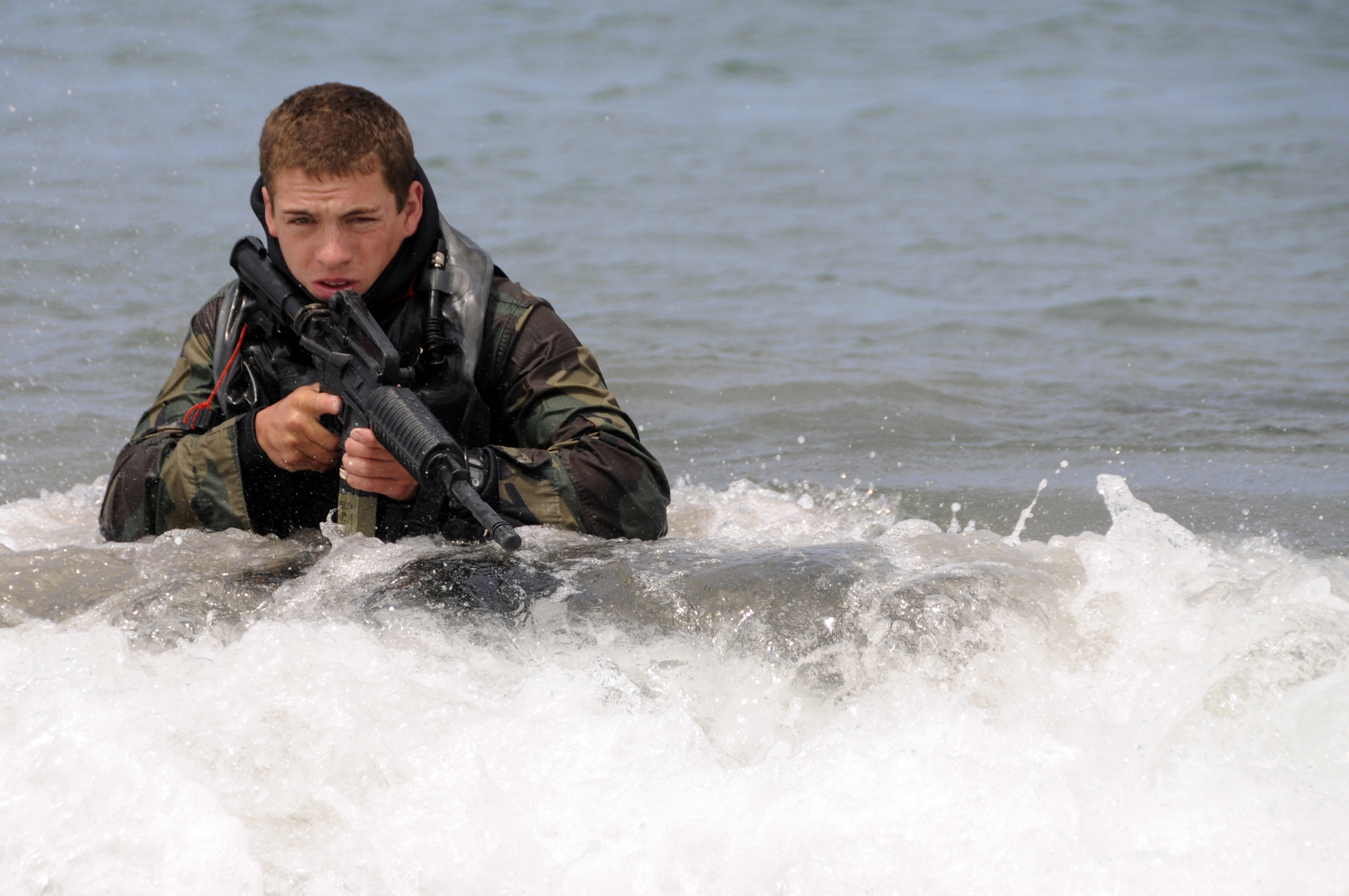
Third Phase A trainee carries out an over the beach exercise on San Clemente Island.

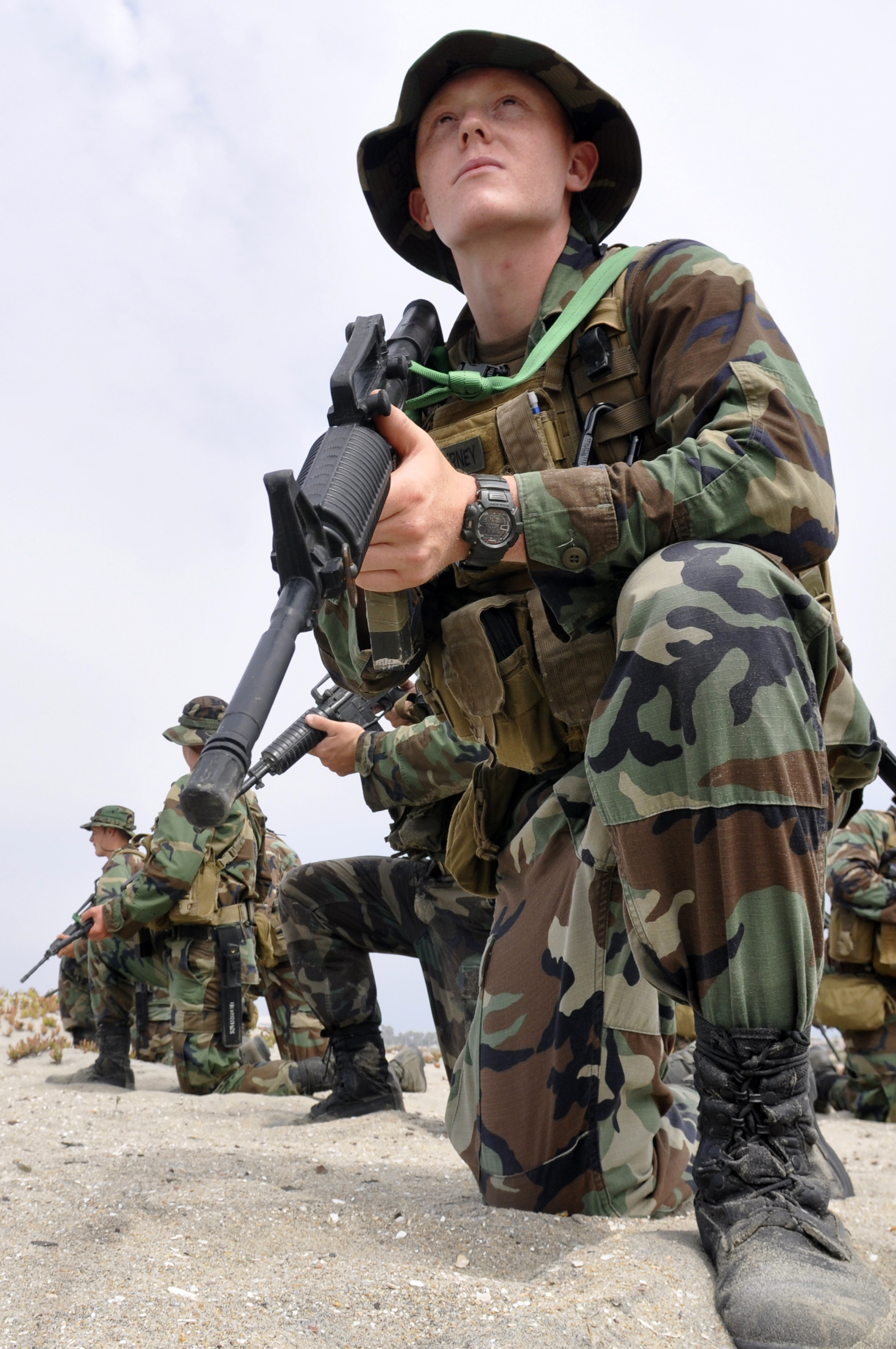
Third Phase Conducting a patrol exercise at Naval Amphibious Base Coronado.

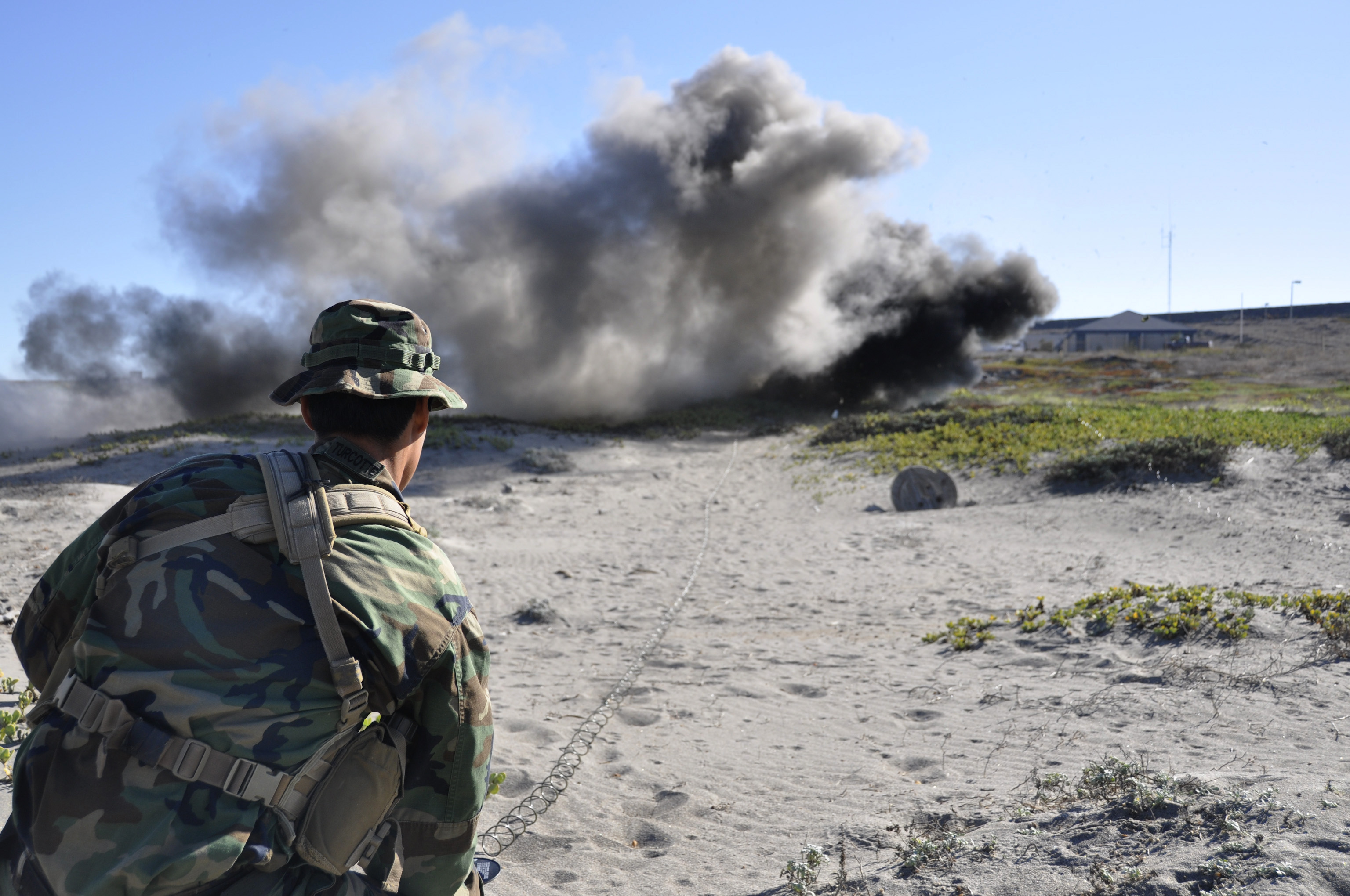
Third Phase A student detonates an explosive charge on San Clemente Island as part of his basic demolitions training.

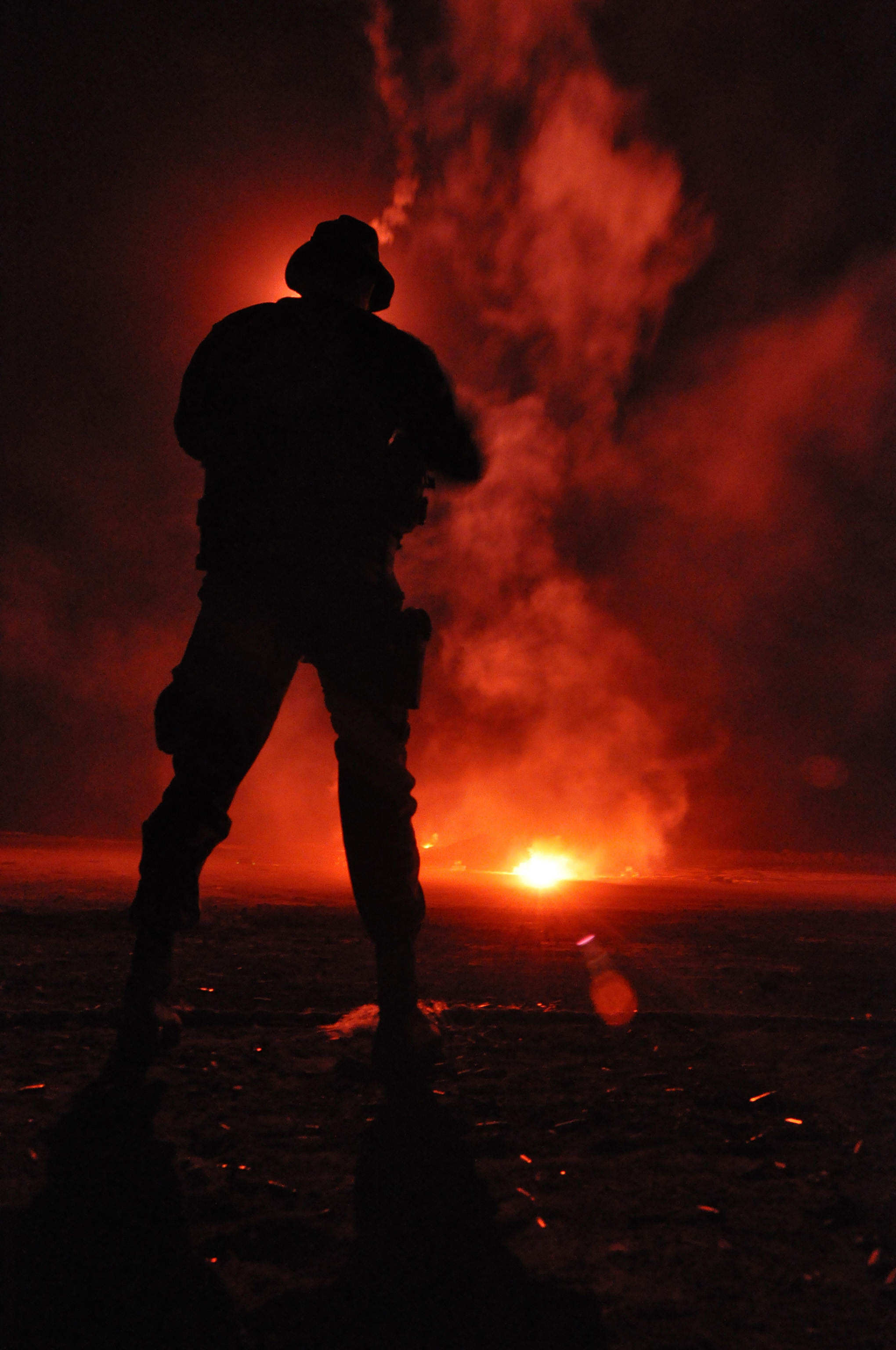
Third Phase A trainee is illuminated by a flare during a live-fire exercise on San Clemente Island.

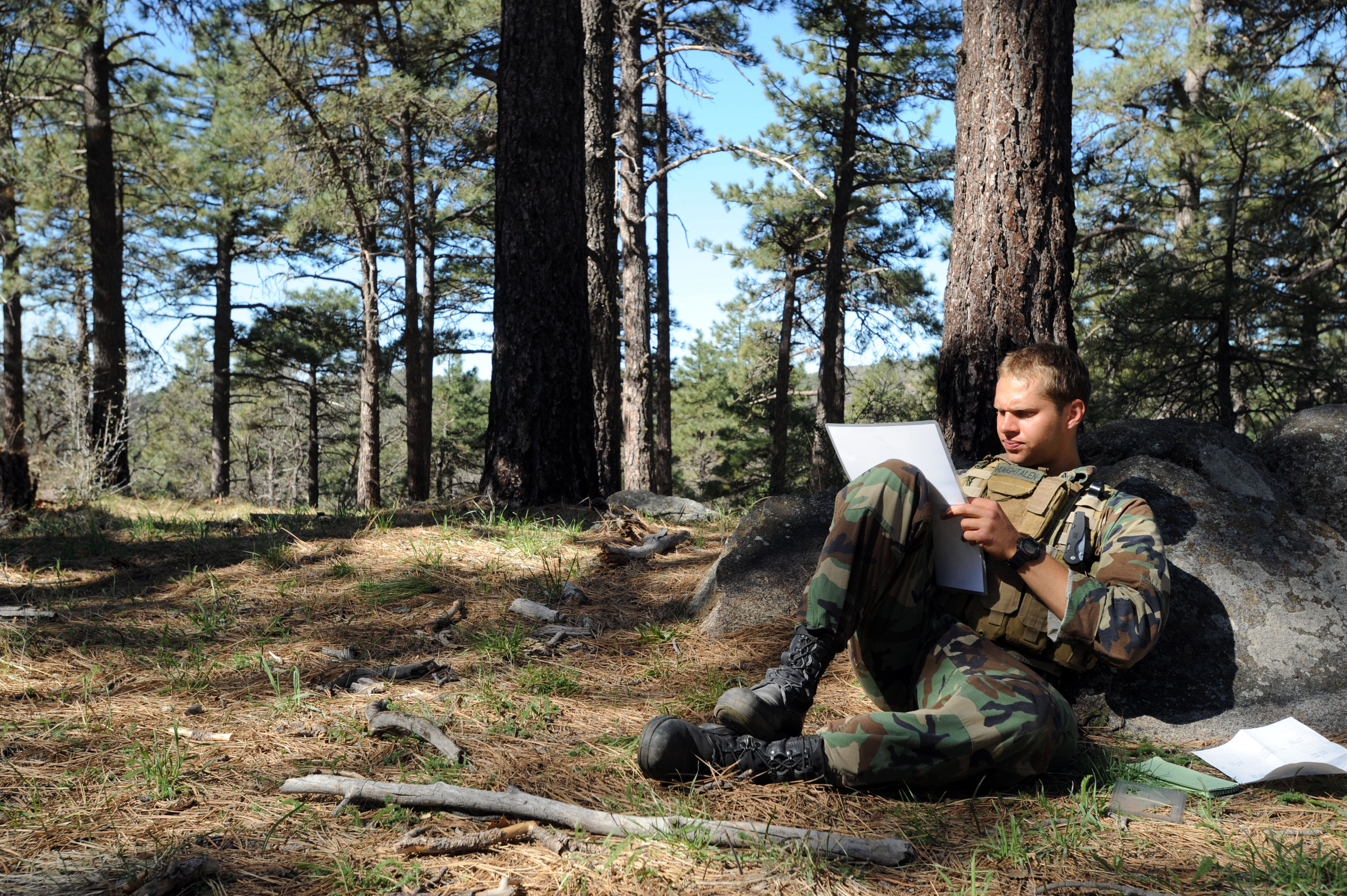
Third Phase A student plots coordinates on his map during an individual land navigation exercise in Mount Laguna.

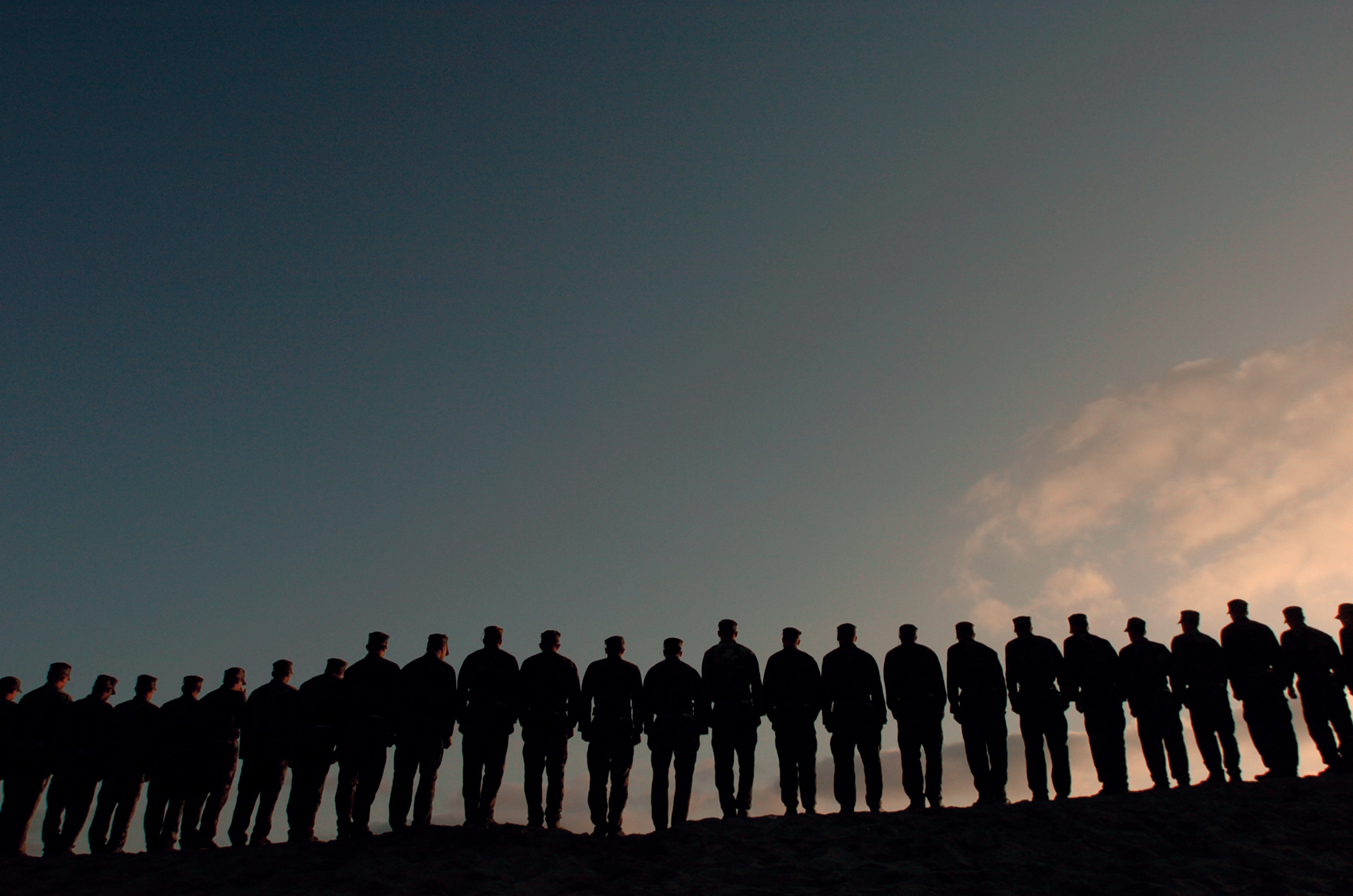
'Hell Week', article in All Hands magazine, August 2004

== Parachute jump school (3 weeks) ==
Upon successful completion of BUD/S, SEAL Candidates go on to receive both static line and free-fall training at Tactical Air Operations in San Diego, California. The three-week program is facilitated by Instructors and designed to develop safe and competent free-fall jumpers in a short period of time.

To complete the course, Candidates must pass through a series of jump progressions, from basic static line to accelerated free fall to combat equipment – ultimately completing night descents with combat equipment from a minimum altitude of 9,500 feet.

== SEAL Qualification Training (SQT) (26 weeks) ==
SEAL Qualification Training (SQT) is a 26-week course that takes the student from the basic elementary level of Naval Special Warfare to a more advanced degree of tactical training. SQT is designed to provide students with the core tactical knowledge they will need to join a SEAL Platoon.

Weapons training, close-quarters combat, small unit tactics, land navigation, demolitions, unarmed combat, cold weather training in Kodiak, Alaska, medical skills and maritime operations. Before graduating, students also attend Survival, Evasion, Resistance and Escape Training (SERE Training).

Graduation from SQT culminates in the awarding of the Navy SEAL Trident and granting of the Navy Enlisted Classification (NEC) 5326 Combatant Swimmer (SEAL) or 1130 Special Warfare (SEAL) Officer. New SEALs are immediately assigned to a SEAL Team at Coronado, CA or Little Creek, VA and begin advanced training for their first deployment.

SEAL Qualification Training
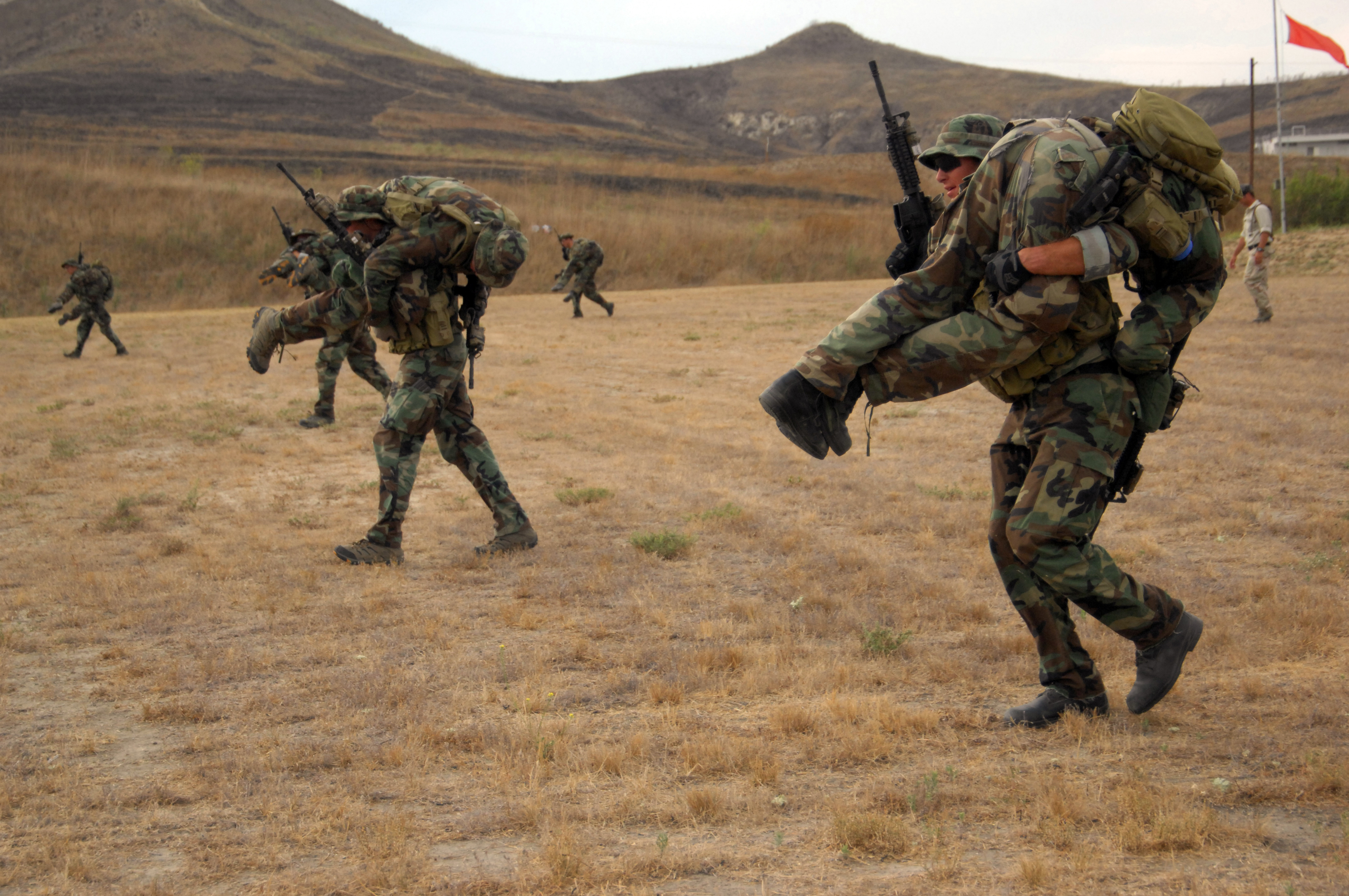
Students simulating moving comrades during a live fire exercise on Camp Pendleton.

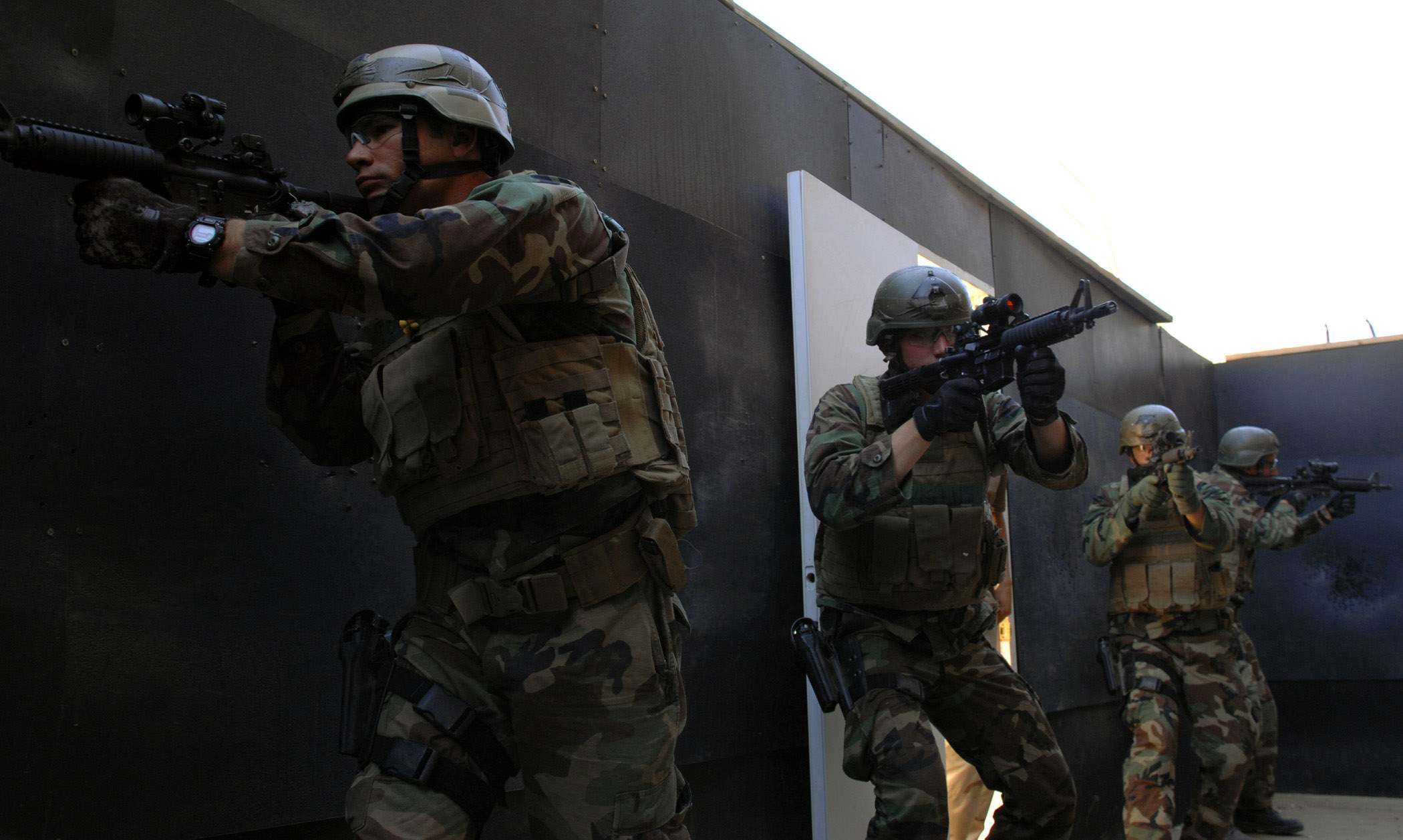
Students at SQT conduct a room clearing exercise.

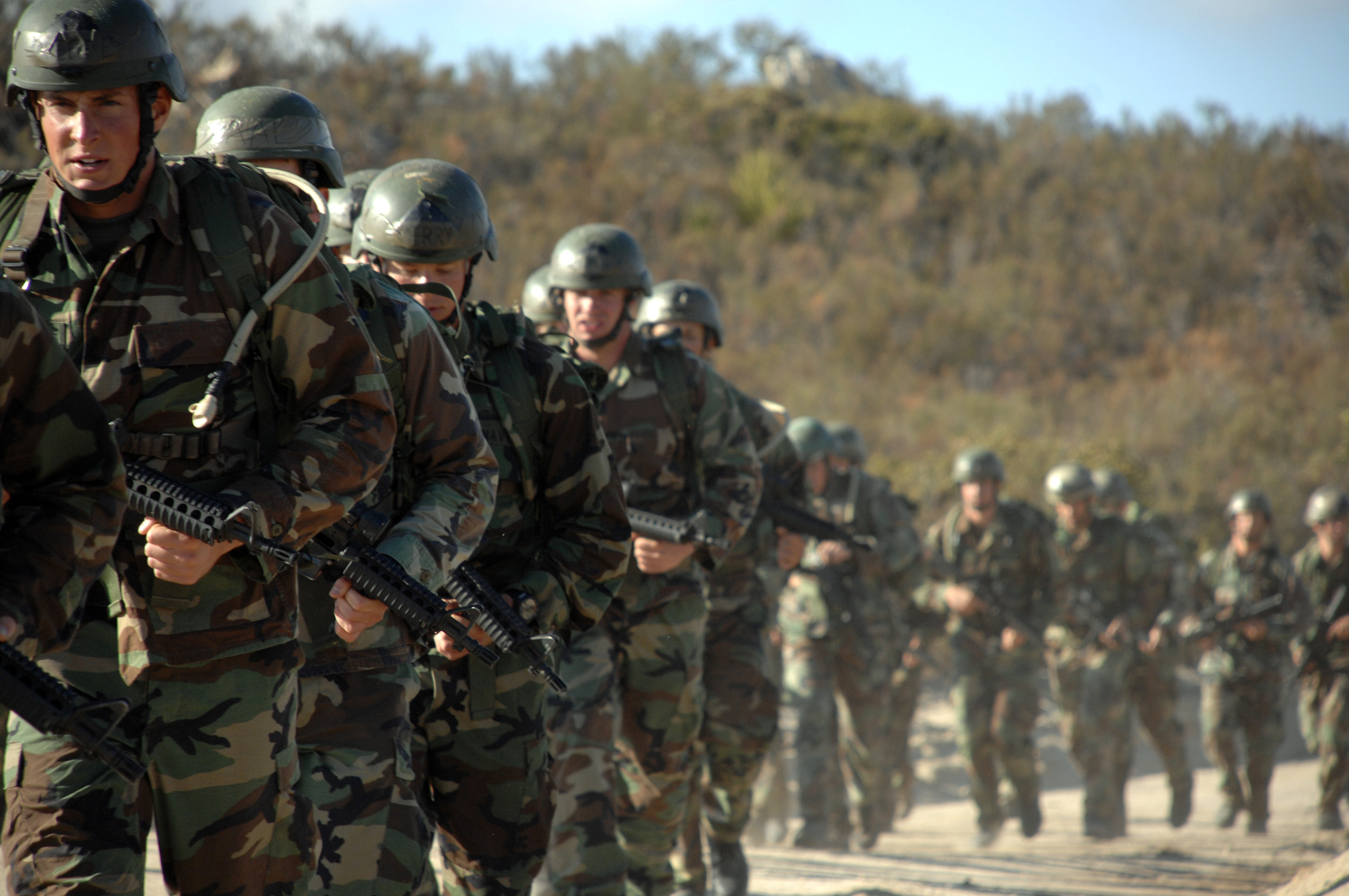
A forced march from the Close Quarters Combat facility.

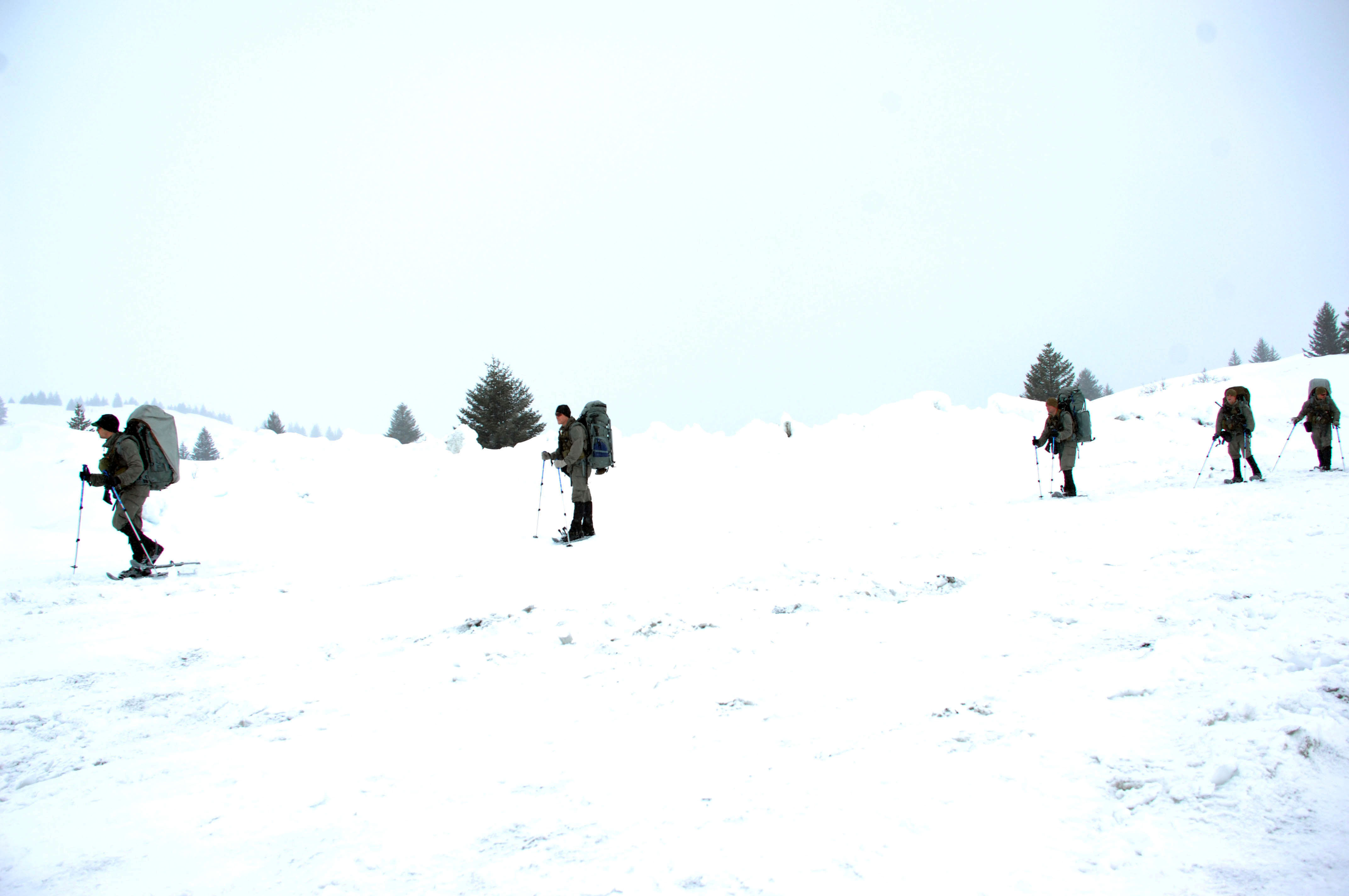
The final portion of SQT is cold weather training at Integrated Support Command Kodiak.

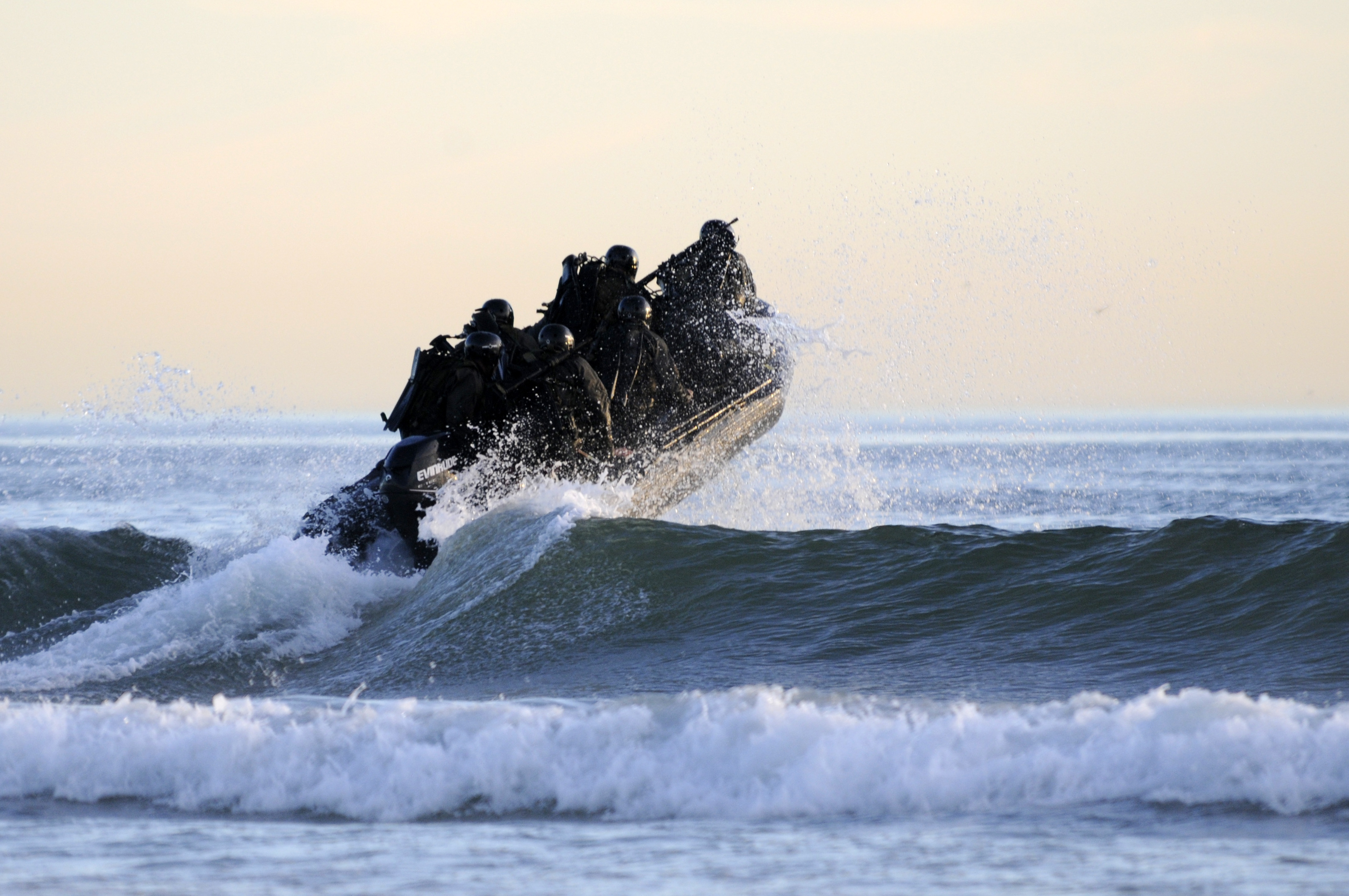
SQT students navigate the surf off the coast of NAB Coronado during a maritime operations training exercise.

== SEAL Troop (TRP) Training ==
Following SQT, new SEALs will receive orders to a SEAL Team and assignment to a Troop (TRP) and subordinate Platoon (PLT). New operators will join their Platoon wherever they are in their deployment cycle. The normal workup or pre-deployment workup is a 12- to 18-month cycle divided into three phases.

=== Individual Specialty Training ===
Phase one of a work-up is Individual Specialty Training. Individual Specialty Training is 6 months long where individual operators attend a number of formal or informal schools and courses. These schools lead to required qualifications and designations that collectively allow the platoon to perform as an operational combat team. Depending on the team's and platoon's needs, operators can expect to acquire some of the following skills (Items in parentheses are Joint SOF Unit Course equivalent):

- SEAL Sniper Course | USMC Scout Sniper Course
- Advanced Close Quarter Combat/Breacher (Barrier Penetration/Methods of Entry)
- Surreptitious Entry (Mechanical and Electronic Bypass)
- (18D) Special Operations Combat Medic Course
- NSWCFC (Naval Special Warfare Combat Fighting Course)
- Advanced Special Operations (MSO)
- Technical Surveillance Operations
- Advanced Driving Skills (Defensive, Rally, Protective Security)
- Climbing/Rope Skills
- Advanced Air Operations: Jumpmaster or Parachute Rigger
- Diving Supervisor or Diving Maintenance-Repair
- Range Safety Officer
- Advanced Demolition
- High Threat Protective Security (PSD) – (US/Foreign Heads of State or High Value Persons of Interest)
- Instructor School and Master Training Specialist
- Unmanned Aerial Vehicle Operator
- Language School
- Joint SOF and Service Professional Military Education (JPME)

=== Unit Level Training ===
Phase two of a work-up is called Unit Level Training (ULT). ULT is a 6-month block run by the respective group (NSWG1/NSWG2) training detachment, where the TRP/PLT's train in their core mission area skills: Small unit tactics, land warfare, close quarters combat, urban warfare, hostile maritime interdiction (VBSS/GOPLATS), combat swimming, long range target interdiction, rotary and fixed wing air/surface operations and special reconnaissance.

=== Task Group Level Training ===
Phase three of a work-up is Task Group Level Training. Task Group Level Training is the last 6-month block wherein a troop conducts advanced training with the supporting attachments/enablers of a SEAL Squadron: Special Boat Teams (SWCC), Intelligence(SI/HI/ETC)Teams, Cryptological Support Teams, Communications (MCT/JCSE) Medical Teams, EOD, Interpreters/Linguist, etc. A final Certification Exercise (CERTEX) is conducted with the entire SEAL Squadron (SQDN) to synchronize Troop (TRP) operations under the Joint Special Operations Task Force (JSOTF) umbrella. Following CERTEX, a SEAL Team becomes a SEAL Squadron and is certified for deployment.

Once certified, a SEAL Team/Squadron will deploy to a Joint Special Operations Task Force or Area of Responsibility to become a Special Operations Task Force (SOTF), combine with a Joint Task Force (JTF) or Task Force (TF) in support of other National Objectives. Once assigned, the Troops will be given an Area of Operations (AOR) where they will either work as a centralized/intact Troop or task organize into decentralized elements (PLT-20/SQD-10/TM-5) to conduct operations. NSW Troops have ranged in size from 60 personnel to over 200 and can consist of SEAL's and any USSOCOM operational element and enablers. A SEAL Team/Squadron deployment currently is approximately 6 months, keeping the entire cycle at 12 to 24 months.

SEAL Troop (TRP) Training
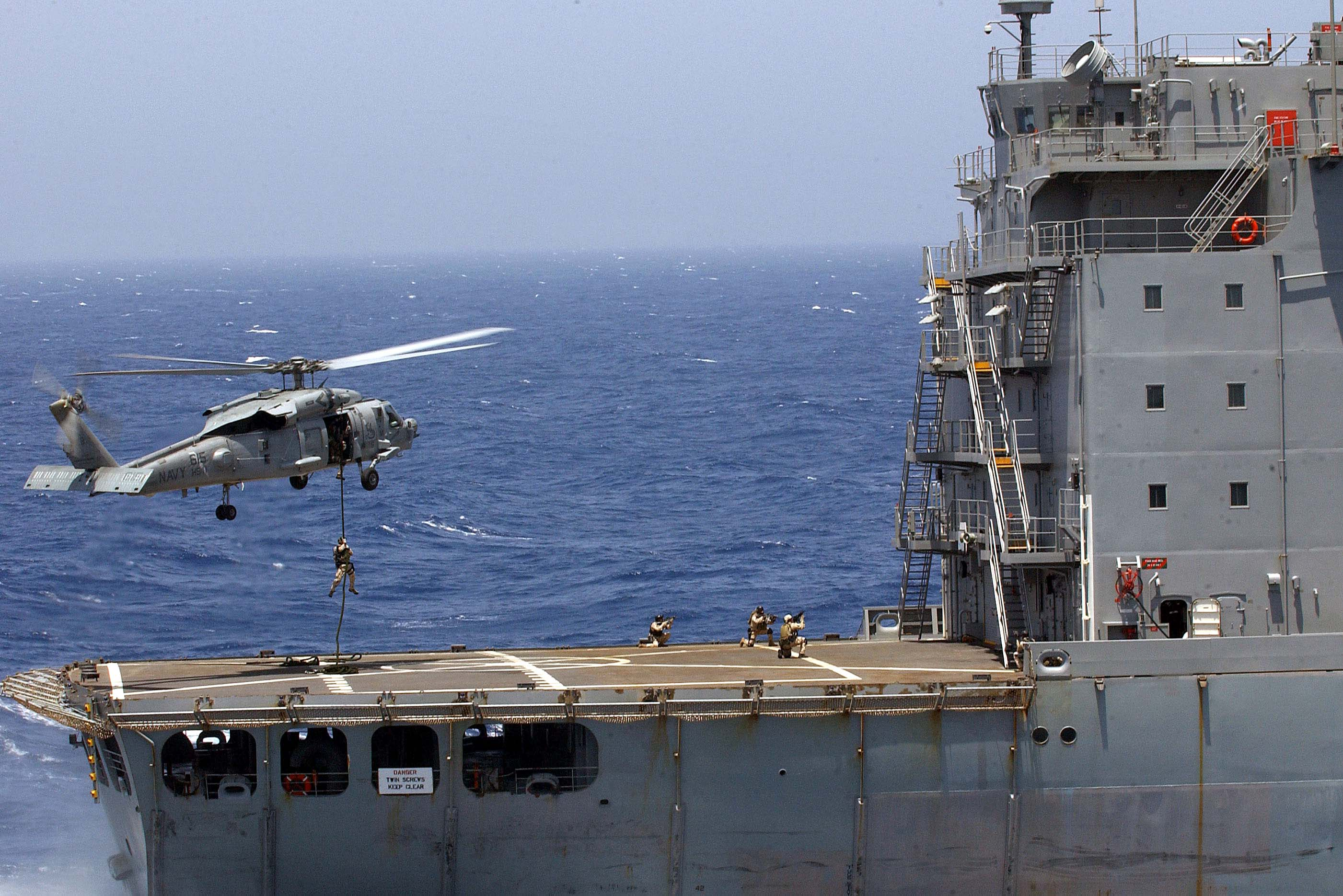
US Navy SEALs demonstrate VBSS techniques for the 2004 Joint Civilian Orientation Conference.

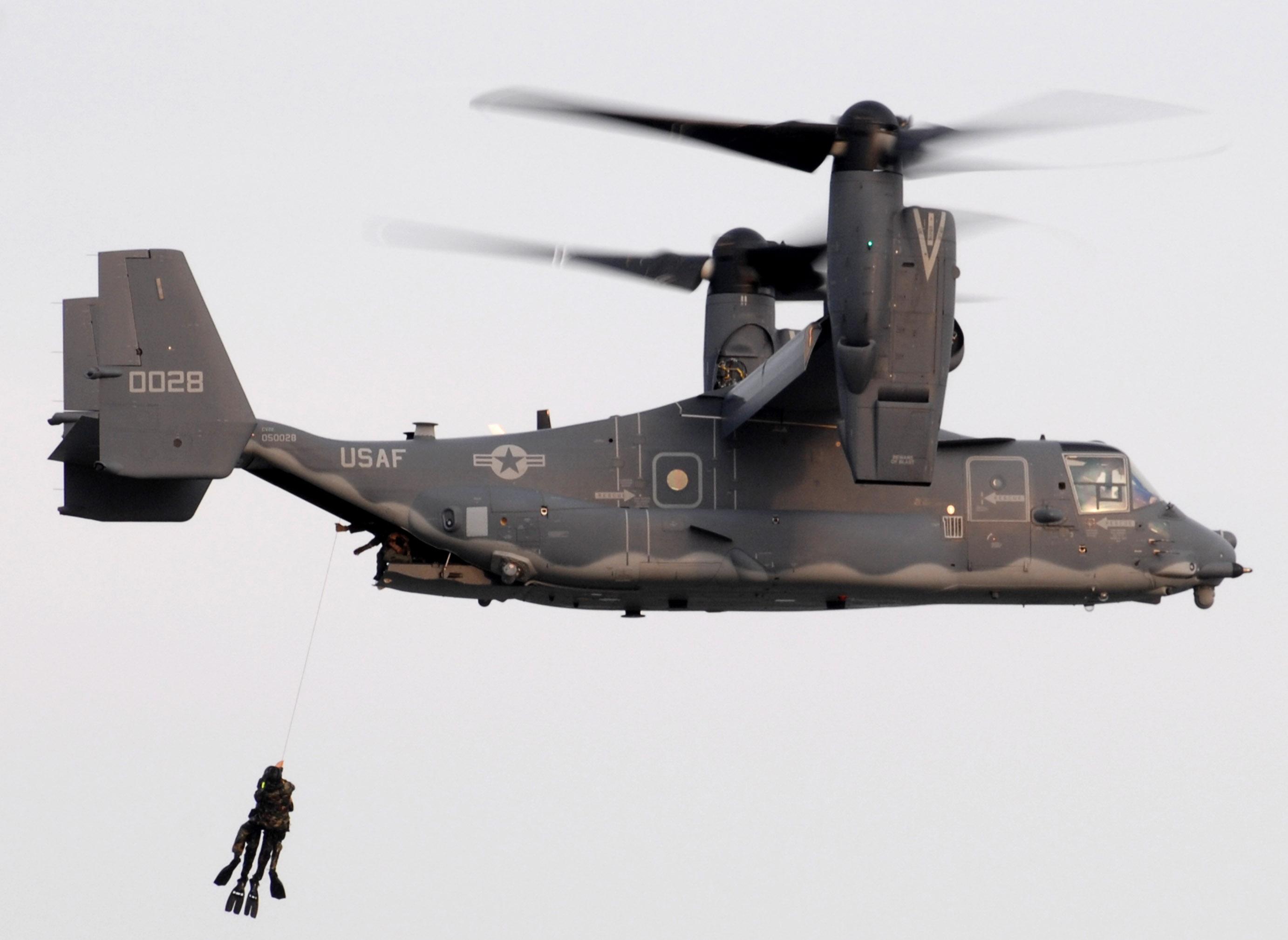
SEALs being hoisted into a CV-22 Osprey from the Air Force's 8th Special Operations Squadron during a joint training exercise.

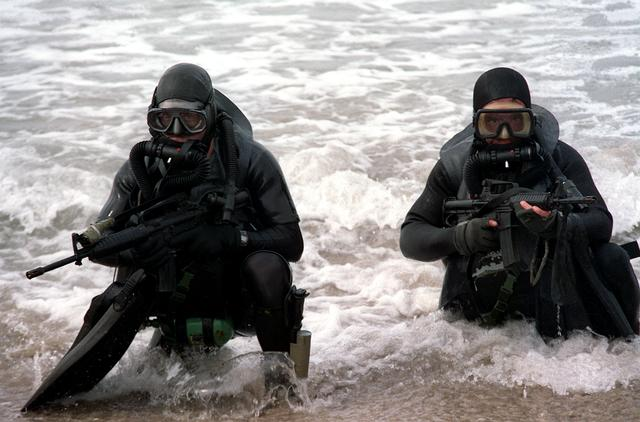
Two SEALs in diving gear scout a beach during an exercise.

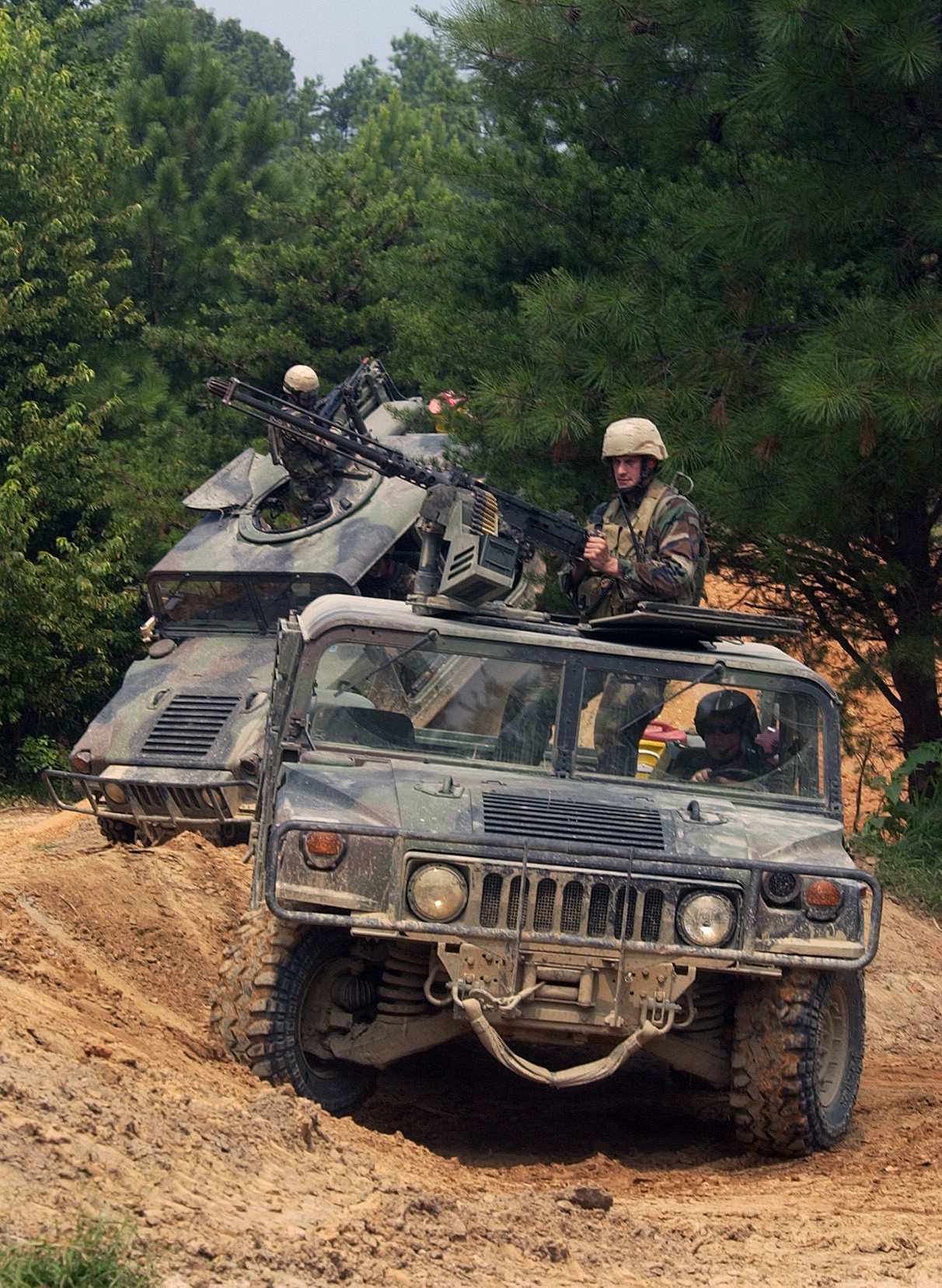
Tactical mobility training

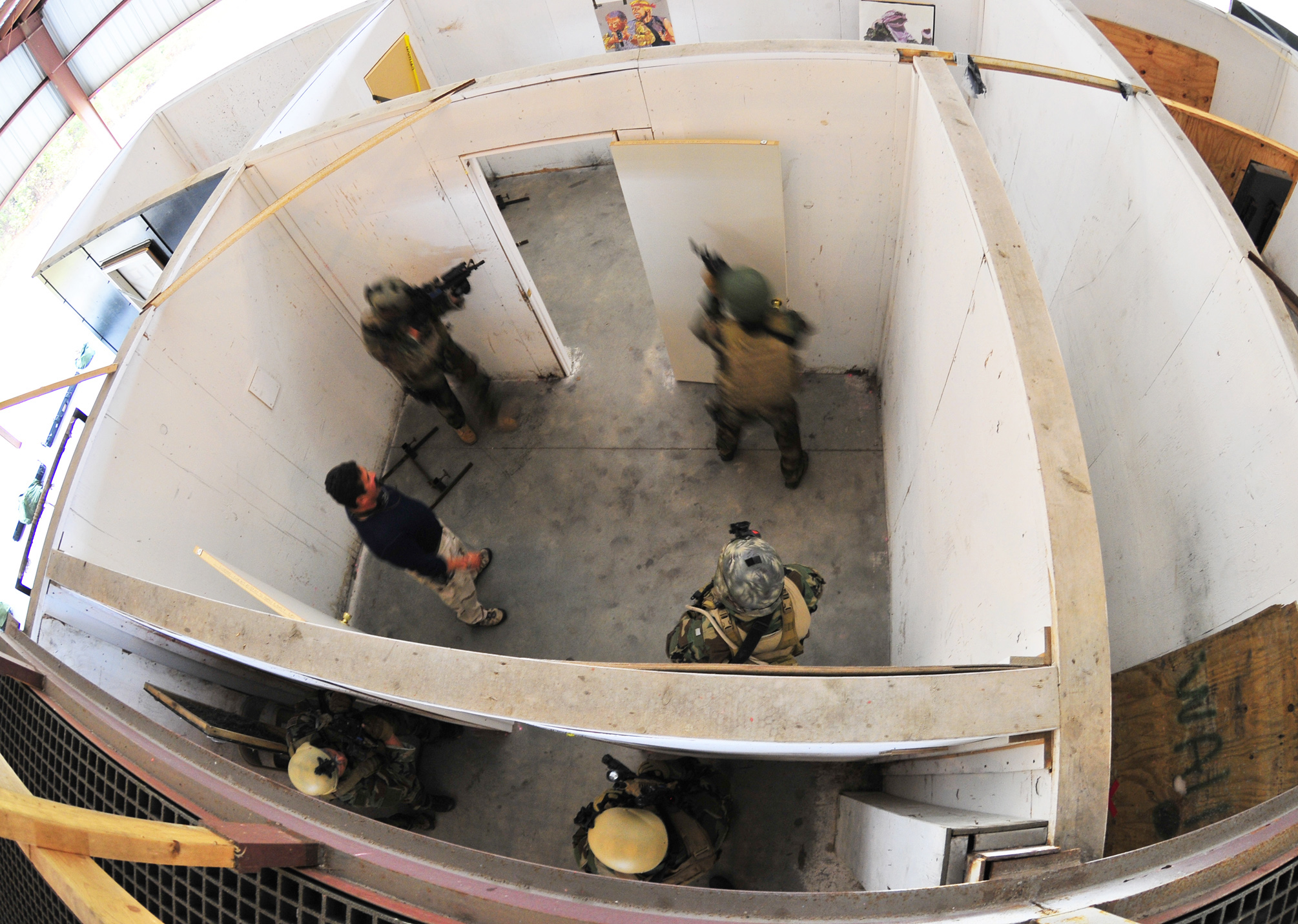
Close quarters combat training

== See also ==
- Naval Special Warfare Advanced Training Command – Component command of the U.S. Naval Special Warfare Command
- SEAL Team Six § Recruitment, selection and training
- Naval Special Warfare Center – Component command of the U.S. Naval Special Warfare Command
- Underwater Demolition Team – US Navy special operations group
- United States Navy SEALs – U.S. Navy's special operations force

=== In other countries ===
- Commandos Marine § Recruitment and training
- Special Boat Service § Recruitment, selection and training
- Kommando Spezialkräfte Marine § Conditions for entry
- MARCOS § Selection and Training
