= Combat sidestroke =

Variation of side-stroke swimming used by United States Navy SEALs

The combat sidestroke (CSS) is a variation of the side stroke that is taught to United States Navy SEAL trainees. It is designed to provide efficient forward movement, minimal visibility, and controlled breathing, particularly when swimming in combat or rough-water conditions.

The combat side stroke is a relaxing and very efficient swim stroke that is an updated version of the traditional sidestroke. The CSS is a mix of sidestroke, front crawl, and breaststroke. The combat side stroke allows the swimmer to swim more efficiently and reduces the body's profile in the water to be less likely to be seen during combat operations if surface swimming is required. The concept of CSS has been that it can be used with or without wearing swim fins (flippers) the only difference being that when wearing swim fins, the swimmer's legs will always be kicking in the regular flutter kick motion without the scissor kick. This stroke is one of the strokes that can be used for prospective SEAL candidates in the SEAL physical screening test (PST), which includes a 500-yard swim in 12 minutes 30 seconds to determine if the candidate is suitable to go to the Basic Underwater Demolitions/SEAL school.

== Basics ==
The combat side stroke uses the three main fundamentals of swimming:

- Balance: There are two things that affect balance in the water: the head and lungs. Most people, when swimming, especially when using breaststroke, will swim with their head up which forces their hips to sink down, which is like they are swimming uphill and is a sign of being less comfortable. However, if the body is flat/horizontal or more parallel to the waterline, it is far more effective and will allow the swimmer to feel more comfortable in the water.
- Length: The taller the person is, the faster the speed through the water. As a result, it is important that the swimmer be fully stretched horizontally in the water, as this will reduce the body's drag through the water and allow a higher speed.
- Rotation: In most sports, such as baseball, when the batter swings the baseball bat, they will rotate the hips to increase the power of the swing. The same principle is applied to swimming. If the swimmer engages the hips and uses the body's core muscles, it will increase power.

== Side stroke variants ==
There are two forms to the combat side stroke: the full combat side stroke and the combat sprinter side stroke. The sprinter side stroke allows the swimmer to move faster in the water compared to the full side stroke.

=== Full side stroke ===
The swimmer starts with the body flat and arms in a fully extended position in the water, facing downward, and legs flutter-kicking. One arm then pulls down in the water to the side of the body; at the same time, the body rotates, and the head takes a breath to the side. The second arm then pulls down with the arm to the side of the body, and the head moves back, facing the bottom of the pool, enabling the body to stay horizontal in the water. The hands move forward fully extended in front of the head while simultaneously performing a scissor-kicking motion, corkscrewing the body back to being flat in the water.

=== Sprinter side stroke ===
The only difference between the full side stroke and sprinter side stroke is instead of bringing the second lead arm fully down to the side of the body, the arm will only half stroke; the arm moves halfway towards the body and is then brought back to the fully extended position.
