= Trudgen =

Swimming style

The trudgen is a swimming stroke sometimes known as the racing stroke, or the East Indian stroke. It is named after the English swimmer John Trudgen (1852–1902) and evolved out of sidestroke.

One swims mostly upon one side, making an overhand movement, lifting the arms alternately out of the water. When the left arm is above the head, the legs spread apart for a kick; as the left arm comes down the legs extend and are then brought together with a sharp scissor kick. The right arm is now brought forward over the water, and as it comes down the left arm is extended again. The scissor kick comes every second stroke; it involves spreading the legs, then bringing them together with a sudden "snap" movement.

The swimmer's face is underwater most of the time; the only chance to breathe is when the hand is coming back and just as the elbow passes the face. The trudgen developed into the front crawl.
