= Sidestroke =

Swimming stroke on one's side with asymmetric arm and leg motion

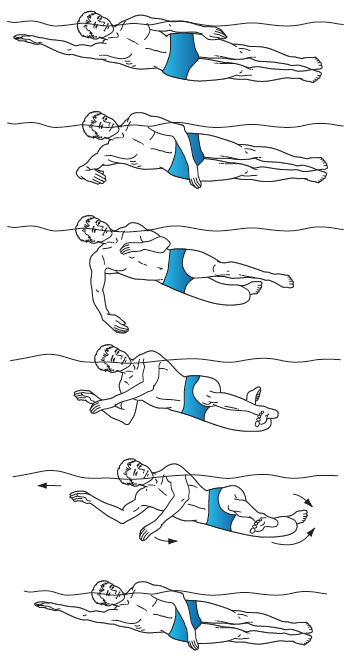

The sidestroke is a swimming stroke, so named because the swimmer lies on one's side with asymmetric arm and leg motion. It is helpful as a lifesaving technique and is often used for long-distance swimming. The sidestroke allows the swimmer increased endurance because instead of working both arms and legs simultaneously in the same way, the side stroke uses them simultaneously but differently. A swimmer tired of exercising one side can turn over and use the other, the change of action helping the limbs to recover.

The hands act like oars, and do not waste any power by oblique action. In ordinary swimming on the right side, the left arm moves gently in the water, almost at rest. Then, when the used arm becomes tired, the swimmer turns on the other side, and the left arm works while the right arm rests.

The legs move in opposite directions with legs bent, and straighten as they come together. The kicking motion is exaggerated and slow, opening the legs wide to provide more thrust rather than the small, fast movement of flutter kick.

== History ==
Until within the last few years, it was generally assumed that breast or belly swimming was the swiftest process, but this opinion has proved fallacious. The side stroke is now universally acknowledged as the superior method and young swimmers would do well to practice it accordingly.

— H. Kenworthy (1846)

Sidestroke evolved in ancient times from swimmers who discovered that it was painful to swim breaststroke with the head above the water. The head naturally turned onto its side, which led to the shoulder dropping. The scissor kick became natural in this situation.

== Modification ==
A modification of swimming on the side is the Trudgen stroke.

== See also ==
- Combat sidestroke, a variation of the side stroke that was developed by and taught to the United States Navy SEALs.
