= Swimming =

Self-propulsion of a person through water

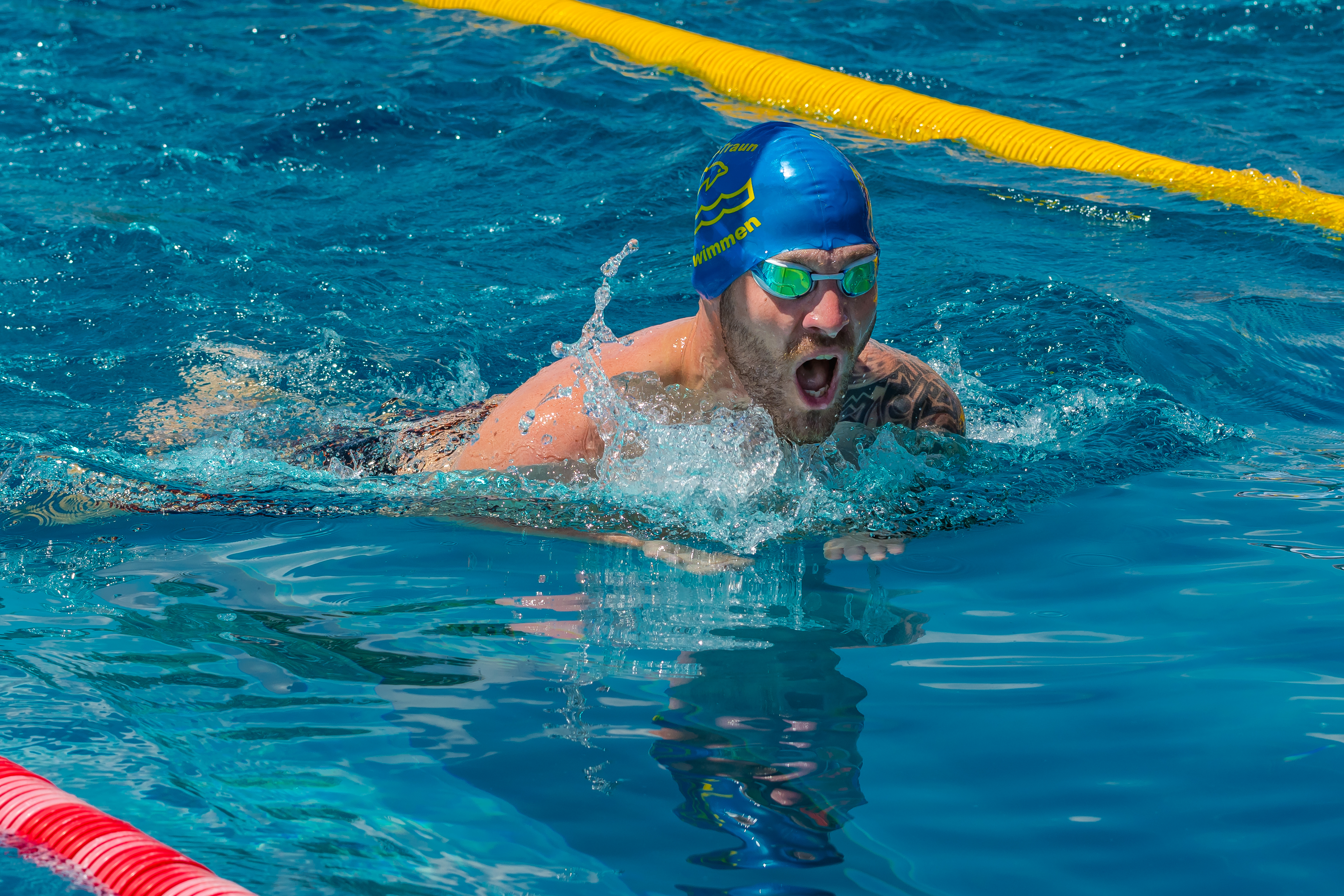
A competitive swimmer performing the breaststroke

Swimming is the self-propulsion of a person through water, usually for recreation, sport, exercise, or survival. Swimmers achieve locomotion by coordinating limb and body movements to achieve a level of buoyancy and hydrodynamic thrust that results in directional motion. For example, they float to a greater or lesser extent, and move in a given direction by coordinating their forward thrusting actions, especially of their head and torso, with other actions such as stroking with their arms and kicking with their legs. Swimming is a whole body exercise that requires endurance, skill and efficient techniques to maximize speed and minimize energy consumption.

Swimming is consistently among the top public recreational activities, and in some countries, swimming lessons are a compulsory part of the educational curriculum. It offers numerous health benefits, such as strengthened cardiovascular health, muscle strength, and increased flexibility. It is suitable for people of all ages and fitness levels. As a formalized sport, swimming is featured in various local, national, and international competitions, including every modern Summer Olympics.

Swimming involves repeated motions known as strokes to propel the body forward. While the front crawl, also known as freestyle, is widely regarded as the fastest of the four main strokes, other strokes are practiced for special purposes, such as training and competition.

Swimming comes with many risks, mainly because of the aquatic environment where it takes place. For instance, swimmers may find themselves incapacitated by panic and exhaustion, both potential causes of death by drowning. Other dangers may arise from exposure to infection or hostile aquatic fauna. To minimize such eventualities, most facilities employ a lifeguard to keep alert for any signs of distress.

Swimmers often wear specialized swimwear, although depending on the area's culture, some swimmers may also swim nude or wear their day attire. In addition, a variety of equipment can be used to enhance the swimming experience or performance, including but not limited to the use of swimming goggles, floatation devices, swim fins, paddles, and snorkels.

== Science ==
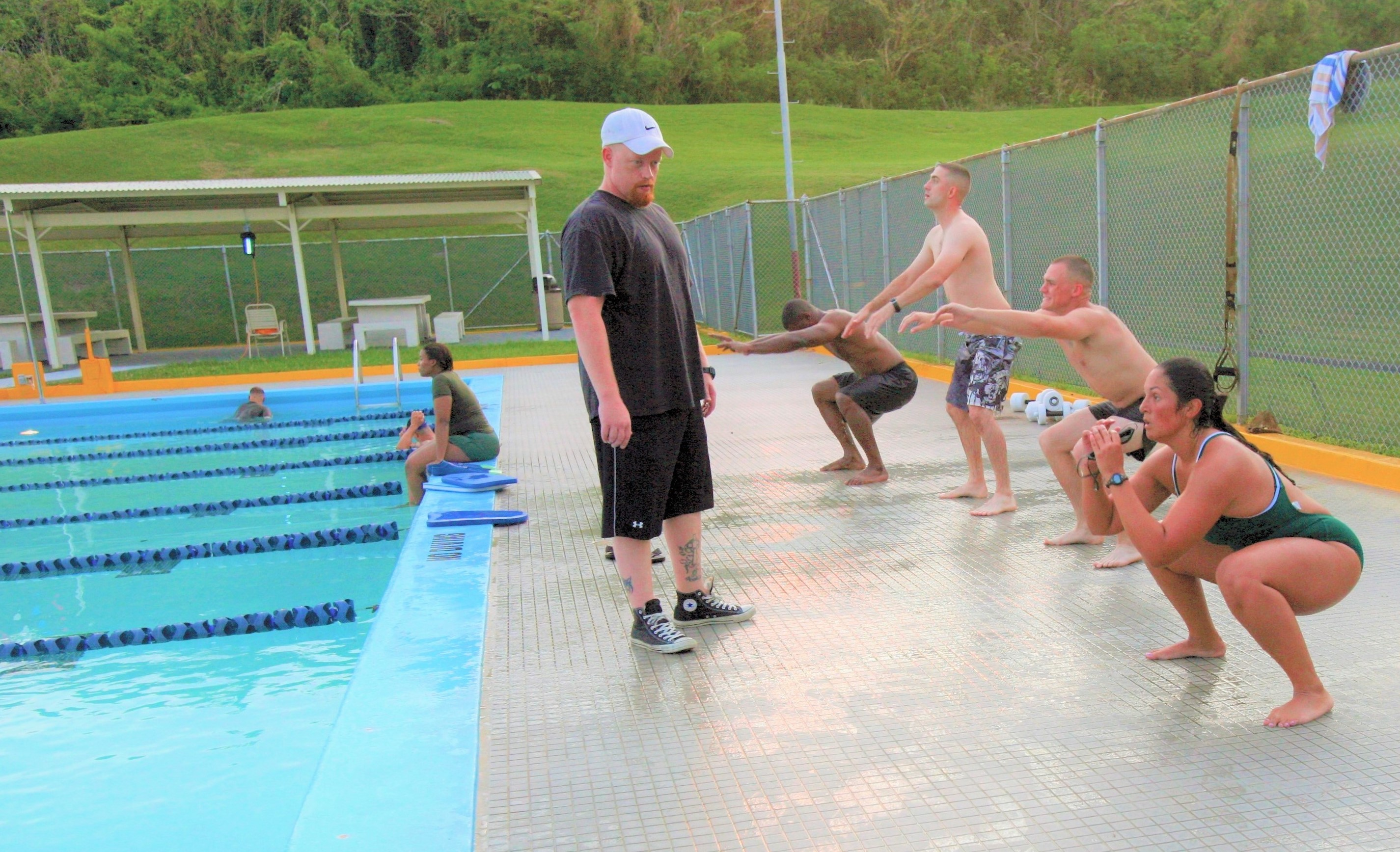
Swimmers perform squats prior to entering the pool in a U.S. military base, 2011.

Swimming relies on the nearly neutral buoyancy of the human body. On average, the body has a relative density of 0.98 compared to water, which causes the body to float. However, buoyancy varies based on body composition, lung inflation, muscle and fat content, centre of gravity and the salinity of the water. Higher levels of body fat and saltier water both lower the relative density of the body and increase its buoyancy. Because they tend to have a lower centre of gravity and higher muscle content, human males find it more difficult to float or be buoyant. See also: Hydrostatic weighing.

Since the human body is less dense than water, water can support the body's weight during swimming. As a result, swimming is "low-impact" compared to land activities such as running. The density and viscosity of water also create resistance for objects moving through the water. Swimming strokes use this resistance to create propulsion, but this same resistance also generates drag on the body.

Hydrodynamics is important to stroke technique for swimming faster, and swimmers who want to swim faster or exhaust less try to reduce the drag of the body's motion through the water. To be more hydrodynamically effective, swimmers can either increase the power of their strokes or reduce water resistance. However, power must increase by a factor of three to achieve the same effect as reducing resistance. Efficient swimming by reducing water resistance involves a horizontal water position, rolling the body to reduce the breadth of the body in the water, and extending the arms as far as possible to reduce wave resistance.

Swimmers may opt to do some pre-swim exercises such as "arm swings", in which they rotate their arms like a windmill, to help loosen their joints and warm their muscles immediately before swimming. Outside the pool, swimmers may incorporate strength training exercises such as squats.

A 2022 systematic review, published in Science & Sports journal, found that adding certain strength training exercises to traditional swimming training may improve both short and medium distance swimming performance. The authors concluded it would be "appropriate" to have strength sessions separated from swimming sessions within a training programme but cautioned against increasing the training volume too much, to avoid "greater fatigue" among swimmers.

== Infant swimming ==
Human babies demonstrate an innate swimming or diving reflex from newborn until approximately ten months. Other mammals also demonstrate this phenomenon (see mammalian diving reflex). The diving response involves apnea, reflex bradycardia, and peripheral vasoconstriction; in other words, babies immersed in water spontaneously hold their breath, slow their heart rate, and reduce blood circulation to the extremities (fingers and toes). Because infants exhibit instinctual swimming behaviors, classes for babies about six months old are offered in many locations, and formal training is recommended to reinforce these abilities. This helps build muscle memory and makes strong swimmers from a young age.

== Technique ==
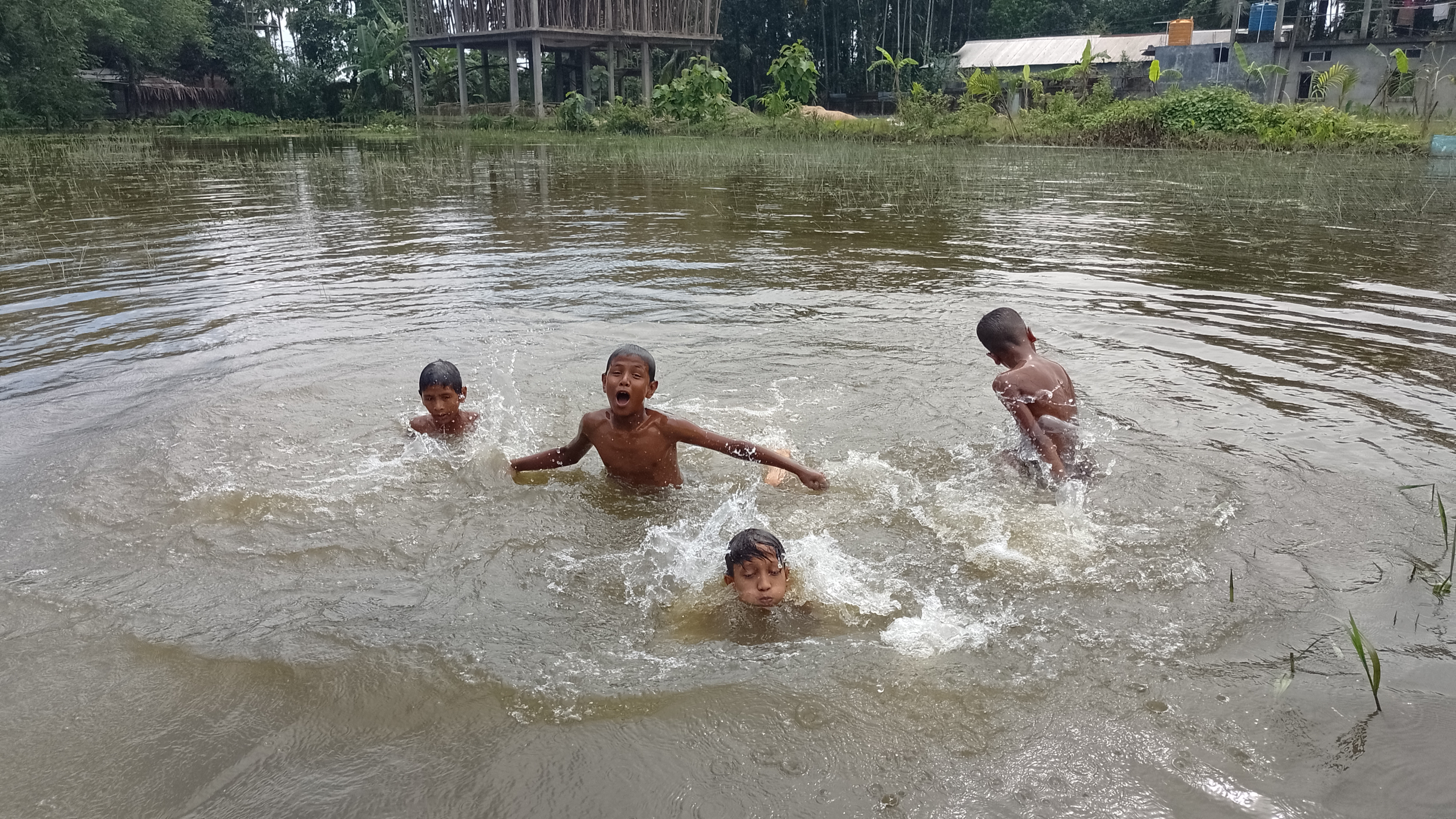
Kids enjoying while swimming in a lake.

Swimming can be undertaken using a wide range of styles, known as 'strokes,' and which are used for different purposes or to distinguish between classes in competitive swimming. Using a defined stroke for propulsion through the water is unnecessary, and untrained swimmers may use a 'doggy paddle' of arm and leg movements, similar to how four-legged animals swim.

Four main strokes are used in competition and recreational swimming: the front crawl (freestyle), breaststroke, backstroke, and butterfly.

In non-competitive swimming, there are some additional swimming strokes, including the sidestroke and survival backstroke. The sidestroke, toward the end of the 19th century, changed this pattern by raising one arm above the water first, then the other, and then each in turn. It is still used in lifesaving and recreational swimming. Survival backstroke is a modified form of backstroke designed to conserve energy and allow a swimmer to remain afloat for extended periods. It is generally performed while lying on the back, using a slow, controlled leg kick and alternating or simultaneous arm movements, with the face kept above the water. The stroke is primarily used in lifesaving, survival swimming and situations where conserving energy in the water is important.

Other strokes exist for particular reasons, such as training, school lessons, and rescue, and it is often possible to change strokes to avoid using parts of the body, either to separate specific body parts, such as swimming with only arms or legs to exercise them harder, or for amputees or those affected by paralysis.

== History ==
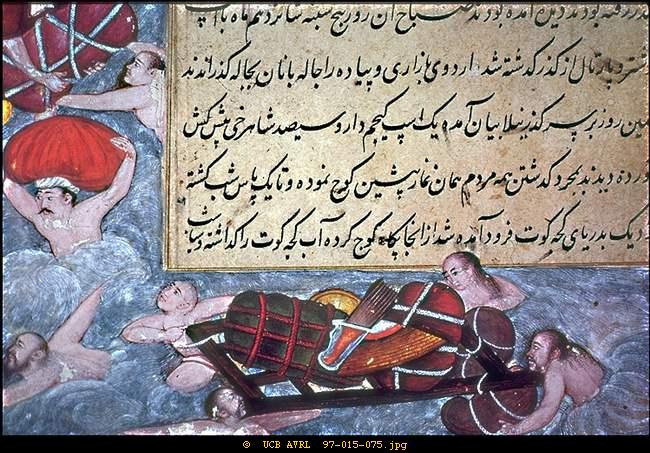
Timurid conqueror Babur's troops swim across a river.

Swimming has been recorded since prehistoric times, and the earliest records of swimming date back to Stone Age paintings from around 7,000 years ago. Written references date from 2000 BC. Some earliest references include the Epic of Gilgamesh, the Iliad, the Odyssey, the Bible (Ezekiel 47:5, Acts 27:42, Isaiah 25:11), Beowulf, and other sagas.

In 450 BC, Herodotus described a failed seaborne expedition of Mardonius with the words "…those who could not swim perished from that cause, others from the cold".

The coastal tribes living in the Low Countries were known as excellent swimmers by the Romans. Men and horses of the Batavi tribe could cross the Rhine without a loss of formation, according to Tacitus. Dio Cassius describes one surprise tactic employed by Aulus Plautius against the Celts at the Battle of the Medway:

The [British Celts] thought that Romans would not be able to cross it without a bridge, and consequently bivouacked in rather careless fashion on the opposite bank; but he sent across a detachment of [Batavii], who were accustomed to swim easily in full armour across the most turbulent streams. ... Thence the Britons retired to the river Thames at a point near where it empties into the ocean and at flood-tide forms a lake. This they easily crossed because they knew where the firm ground and the easy passages in this region were to be found, but the Romans in attempting to follow them were not so successful. However, the [Batavii] swam across again and some others got over by a bridge a little way up-stream, after which they assailed the barbarians from several sides at once and cut down many of them.

The Talmud, a compendium of Jewish law written compiled c. 500 CE, requires fathers to teach their son how to swim.

In 1538, Nikolaus Wynmann, a Swiss–German professor of languages, wrote the earliest known complete book about swimming, Colymbetes, sive de arte natandi dialogus et festivus et iucundus lectu (The Swimmer, or A Dialogue on the Art of Swimming and Joyful and Pleasant to Read).

The Birdman cult of Rapa Nui held an annual ritual competition to determine the Tangata manu, in which men swam one kilometer to and from an islet to collect the first sooty tern egg of the season. The ceremony was suppressed by Christian missionaries in the 1860s.

Competitive swimming in Europe started around 1800, mostly using the breaststroke, which started as the current breaststroke arms and the legs of the butterfly stroke. In 1873, John Arthur Trudgen introduced the trudgen to Western swimming competitions. Swimming was introduced as a competitional sporting event in the 1896 Summer Olympics in Athens, Greece.

The butterfly was developed in the 1930s and was considered a variant of the breaststroke until it was accepted as a separate style in 1953.

== Purpose ==
There are many reasons why people swim, from recreational intentions to swimming as a necessary part of a job or other activity. Swimming may also be used to rehabilitate injuries, especially various cardiovascular and muscle injuries. Professional opportunities in swimming range from competitive sports to coaching, lifeguarding, and working in aquatic therapy. Some may be gifted and choose to compete professionally and go on to claim fame.

=== Recreation ===
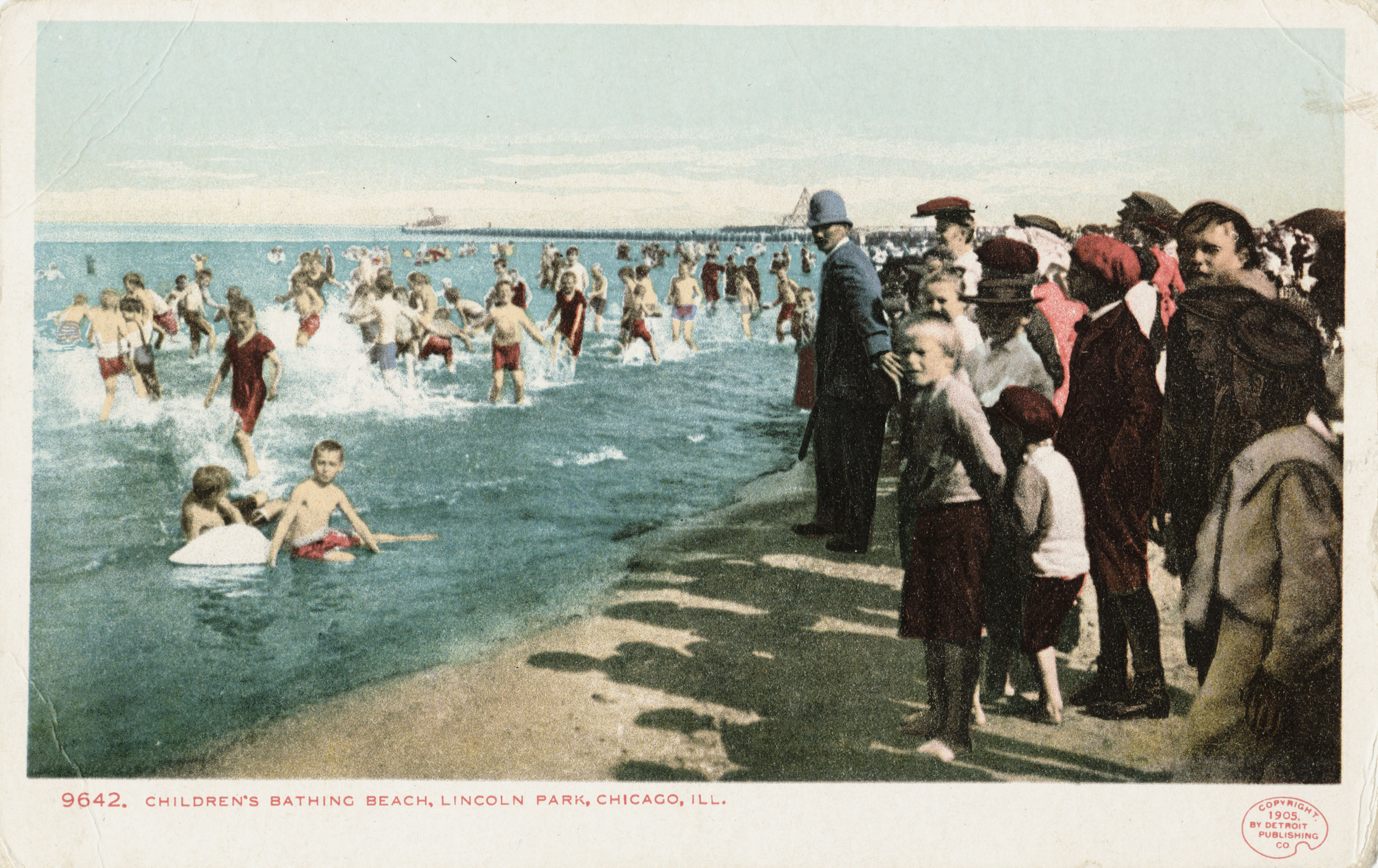
Children's bathing beach, Lincoln Park, Chicago, Illinois, United States, 1905

Many swimmers swim for recreation, with swimming consistently ranking as one of the physical activities people are most likely to participate in. Recreational swimming can also be used for exercise, relaxation, or rehabilitation.

=== Health ===
Chuck Sketch, a former U.S. Marine and a Wounded Warrior with the veteran swim team, swims laps during a practice session at the 2012 Marine Corps Trials at Marine Corps Base Camp Pendleton, California, February 14, 2012. Wounded Warriors, veterans, and allies competed in the second annual trials, which included swimming.

Swimming is primarily a cardiovascular/aerobic exercise due to the long exercise time, requiring a constant oxygen supply, except for short sprints where the muscles work anaerobically. Furthermore, swimming can help tone and strengthen muscles. Regular swimming can help in weight management and contribute to maintaining a healthy body weight. Swimming allows sufferers of arthritis to exercise affected joints without worsening their symptoms. Swimming is often recommended for individuals with joint conditions or injuries, as the buoyancy of water reduces stress on the joints. Under the right conditions, it is also an excellent form of exercise for children and senior citizens. However, swimmers with arthritis may wish to avoid swimming breaststroke, as improper technique can exacerbate arthritic knee pain. As with most aerobic exercise, swimming reduces the harmful effects of stress. Swimming also improves health for people with cardiovascular problems and chronic illnesses. It is proven to impact the mental health of pregnant women and mothers positively. Swimming can even improve mood. Although many forms of physical activity have been shown to improve bone density and health, this is where swimming has its downfalls. Due to the low-impact nature of the sport, studies have demonstrated that bone mass acquisition will be negatively impacted, which could be an issue for adolescent athletes in particular. A 2025 study found that swimming outdoors is associated with greater levels of well-being. However, 'wild swimming' or open water swimming, where swimming takes place in rivers, lakes or the sea, has been found to be associated with higher well-being than swimming in outdoor pools.

==== Disabled swimmers ====
Since 2010, the Americans with Disabilities Act has required that swimming pools in the United States be accessible to disabled swimmers.

==== Elderly swimmers ====
"Water-based exercise can benefit older adults by improving quality of life and decreasing disability. It also improves or maintains the bone health of post-menopausal women." Swimming is an ideal workout for the elderly, as it is a low-impact sport with very little risk of injury. Exercise in the water works out all muscle groups, helping with conditions such as muscular dystrophy which is common in seniors. It is also a common way to relieve pain from arthritis.

=== Sport ===
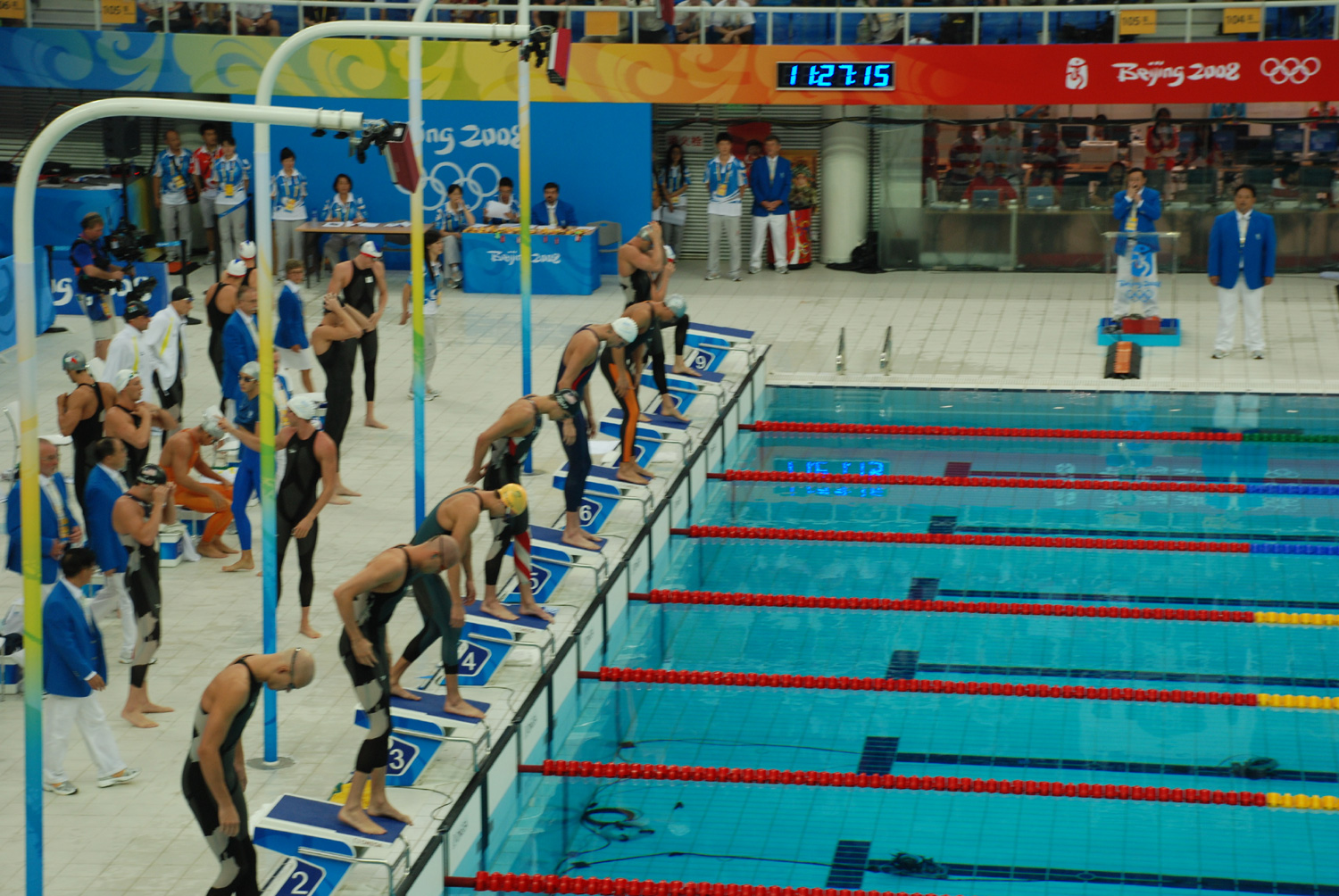
Start of the 4 × 100 meters men's relay during the 2008 Summer Olympics in Beijing

Swimming as a sport predominantly involves participants competing to be the fastest over a given distance in a certain period of time. Competitors swim different distances in different levels of competition. For example, swimming has been an Olympic sport since 1896, and the current program includes events from 50 m to 1500 m in length, across all four main strokes and medley. During the season competitive swimmers typically train multiple times per day and week to increase endurance, strength, and preserve fitness. Furthermore when the cycle of work is completed swimmers go through a stage called taper where intensity is reduced in preparation for competition season. During taper, focus is on power and water feel.

The sport is governed internationally by World Aquatics, formerly known as FINA (Fédération Internationale de Natation) before it adopted its current name in December 2022. World Aquatics recognizes competitions of the 25 meter and 50 meter pools for International Competitions. In the United States, a pool of 25 yards in length is commonly used for competition, especially in the College Level.

Other swimming and water-related sporting disciplines include open water swimming, diving, synchronized swimming, water polo, triathlon, and the modern pentathlon.

=== Safety ===
To prioritize safety when swimming, swimmers can ensure that there are certified lifeguards present, swimming in designated areas, and being aware of potential hazards such as currents and underwater obstacles.

As a popular leisure activity done all over the world, one of the primary risks of swimming is drowning. Drowning may occur from a variety of factors, from swimming fatigue to simply inexperience in the water. From 2005 to 2014, an average of 3,536 fatal unintentional drownings occurred in the United States, approximating 10 deaths a day and 67 deaths a week.

To minimize the risk and prevent potential drownings from occurring, lifeguards are often employed to supervise swimming locations such as public pools, waterparks, lakes and beaches. Different lifeguards receive different training depending on the sites that they are employed at; i.e. a waterfront lifeguard receives more rigorous training than a poolside lifeguard. Well-known aquatic training services include the National Lifesaving Society and the Canadian Red Cross, which specialize in training lifeguards in North America.

Learning basic water safety skills, such as swimming with a buddy and knowing how to respond to emergencies, is essential for swimmers of all levels.

=== Occupation ===
Some occupations require workers to swim, such as abalone and pearl diving, and spearfishing.

Swimming is used to rescue people in the water who are in distress, including exhausted swimmers, non-swimmers who have accidentally entered the water, and others who have come to harm on the water. Lifeguards or volunteer lifesavers are deployed at many pools and beaches worldwide to fulfil this purpose, and they, as well as rescue swimmers, may use specific swimming styles for rescue purposes.

Swimming is also used in marine biology to observe plants and animals in their natural habitat. Other sciences use swimming; for example, Konrad Lorenz swam with geese as part of his studies of animal behavior.

Swimming also has military purposes. Military swimming is usually done by special operation forces, such as Navy SEALs and US Army Special Forces. Swimming is used to approach a location, gather intelligence, engage in sabotage or combat, and subsequently depart. This may also include airborne insertion into water or exiting a submarine while it is submerged. Due to regular exposure to large bodies of water, all recruits in the United States Navy, Marine Corps, and Coast Guard are required to complete basic swimming or water survival training.

Swimming is also a professional sport. Companies sponsor swimmers who have the skills to compete at the international level. Many swimmers compete competitively to represent their home countries in the Olympics. Professional swimmers may also earn a living as entertainers, performing in water ballets.

=== Locomotion ===
Locomotion by swimming over brief distances is frequent when alternatives are precluded. There have been cases of political refugees swimming in the Baltic Sea and of people jumping in the water and swimming ashore from vessels not intended to reach land where they planned to go.

== Risks ==
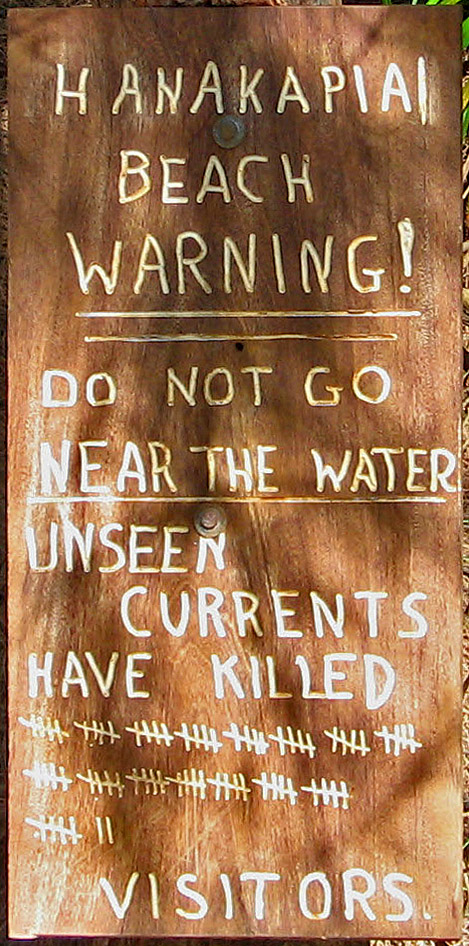
A sign warns hikers on the trail to Hanakāpīʻai Beach.

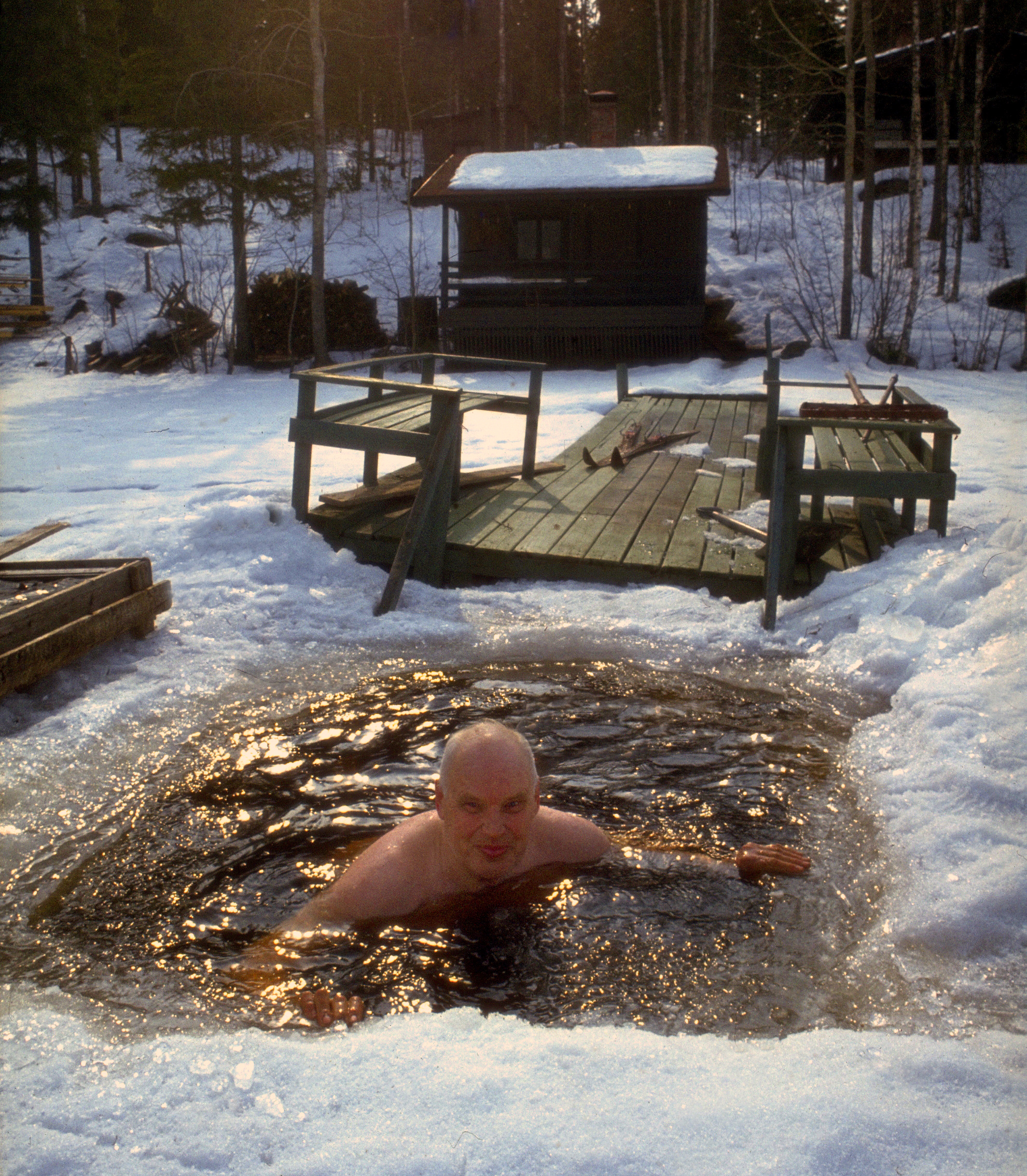
Man smiling to camera while ice swimming at a summer cottage in Finland

There are many risks associated with voluntary or involuntary human presence in water, which may result in death directly or through drowning asphyxiation. Swimming is both the goal of much voluntary presence and the prime means of regaining land in accidental situations.

Most recorded water deaths fall into these categories:

- Panic occurs when an inexperienced swimmer or a non-swimmer becomes mentally overwhelmed by the circumstances of their immersion, leading to sinking and drowning. Occasionally, panic kills through hyperventilation, even in shallow water.
- Exhaustion can make a person unable to sustain efforts to swim or tread water, often leading to death through drowning. An adult with fully developed and extended lungs has generally positive or at least neutral buoyancy, and can float with modest effort when calm and in still water. A small child has negative buoyancy and must make a sustained effort to avoid sinking rapidly.
- Hypothermia, in which a person loses critical core temperature, can lead to unconsciousness or heart failure.
- Dehydration from prolonged exposure to hypertonic salt water—or, less frequently, salt water aspiration syndrome where inhaled salt water creates foam in the lungs that restricts breathing—can cause loss of physical control or kill directly without actual drowning. Hypothermia and dehydration also kill directly, without causing drowning, even when the person wears a life vest.
- Blunt trauma in a fast moving flood or river water can kill a swimmer outright, or lead to their drowning.

Adverse effects of swimming can include:

- Exostosis, an abnormal bony overgrowth narrowing the ear canal due to frequent, long-term splashing or filling of cold water into the ear canal, also known as surfer's ear
- Infection from water-borne bacteria, viruses, or parasites
- Chlorine inhalation (in swimming pools)
- Heart attacks while swimming (the primary cause of sudden death among triathlon participants, occurring at the rate of 1 to 2 per 100,000 participations.)
- Adverse encounters with aquatic life:
  - Stings from sea lice, jellyfish, fish, seashells, and some species of coral
  - Puncture wounds caused by crabs, lobsters, sea urchins, zebra mussels, stingrays, flying fish, sea birds, and debris
  - Hemorrhaging bites from fish, marine mammals, and marine reptiles, occasionally resulting from predation
  - Venomous bites from sea snakes and certain species of octopus
  - Electrocution or mild shock from electric eels and electric rays

Around any pool area, safety equipment is often important, and is a zoning requirement for most residential pools in the United States. Supervision by personnel trained in rescue techniques is required at most competitive swimming meets and public pools.

== Lessons ==
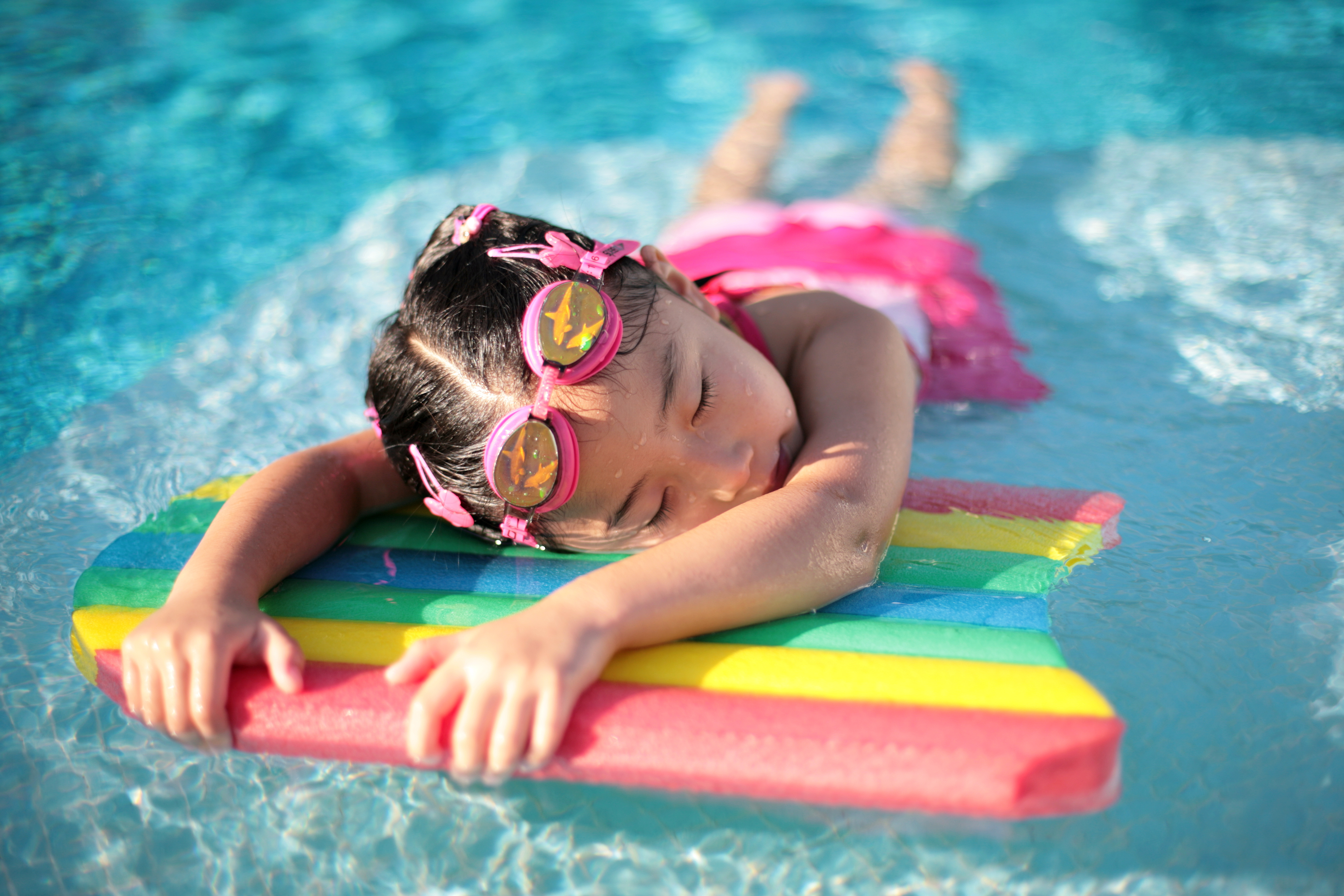
A Styrofoam flotation aid being used

Traditionally, children were considered not able to swim independently until 4 years of age, although now infant swimming lessons are recommended to prevent drowning.

In Sweden, Denmark, Norway, Estonia and Finland, the curriculum for the fifth grade (fourth grade in Estonia) states that all children should learn to swim as well as how to handle emergencies near water. Most commonly, children are expected to be able to swim 200 metres (660 ft)—of which at least 50 metres (160 ft) on their back – after first falling into deep water and getting their head under water. Even though about 95 percent of Swedish school children know how to swim, drowning remains the third most common cause of death among children.

In both the Netherlands and Belgium swimming lessons under school time (schoolzwemmen, school swimming) are supported by the government. Most schools provide swimming lessons. There is a long tradition of swimming lessons in the Netherlands and Belgium, the Dutch translation for the breaststroke swimming style is even schoolslag (schoolstroke). In France, swimming is a compulsory part of the curriculum for primary schools. Children usually spend one semester per year learning swimming during CP/CE1/CE2/CM1 (1st, 2nd, 3rd and 4th grade).

In many places, swimming lessons are provided by local swimming pools, both those run by the local authority and by private leisure companies. Many schools also include swimming lessons into their Physical Education curricula, provided either in the schools' own pool or in the nearest public pool.

In the UK, the "Top-ups scheme" calls for school children who cannot swim by the age of 11 to receive intensive daily lessons. Children who have not reached Great Britain's National Curriculum standard of swimming 25 meters by the time they leave primary school receive a half-hour lesson every day for two weeks during term-time.

In Canada and Mexico there has been a call to include swimming in public school curriculum.

In the United States there is the Infant Swimming Resource (ISR) initiative that provides lessons for infant children, to cope with an emergency where they have fallen into the water. They are taught how to roll-back-to-float (hold their breath underwater, to roll onto their back, to float unassisted, rest and breathe until help arrives), while clothed and unclothed. In ISR they teach the children how to roll with their clothes on, as a simulation, if they were to actually fall in walking or crawling by.

In Switzerland, swimming lessons for babies are popular, to help them getting used to be in another element. At the competition level, unlike in other countries - such as the Commonwealth countries, swimming teams are not related to educational institutions (high-schools and universities), but rather to cities or regions.

== Clothing and equipment ==
=== Swimsuits ===
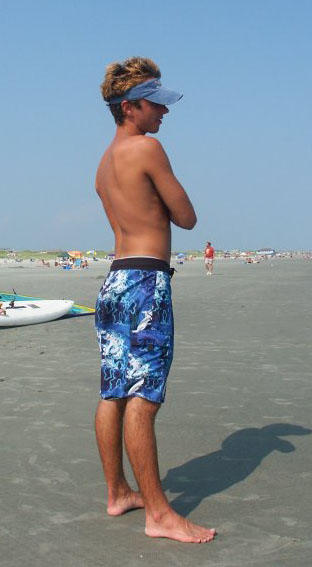
Boardshorts, a type of male casual swimwear

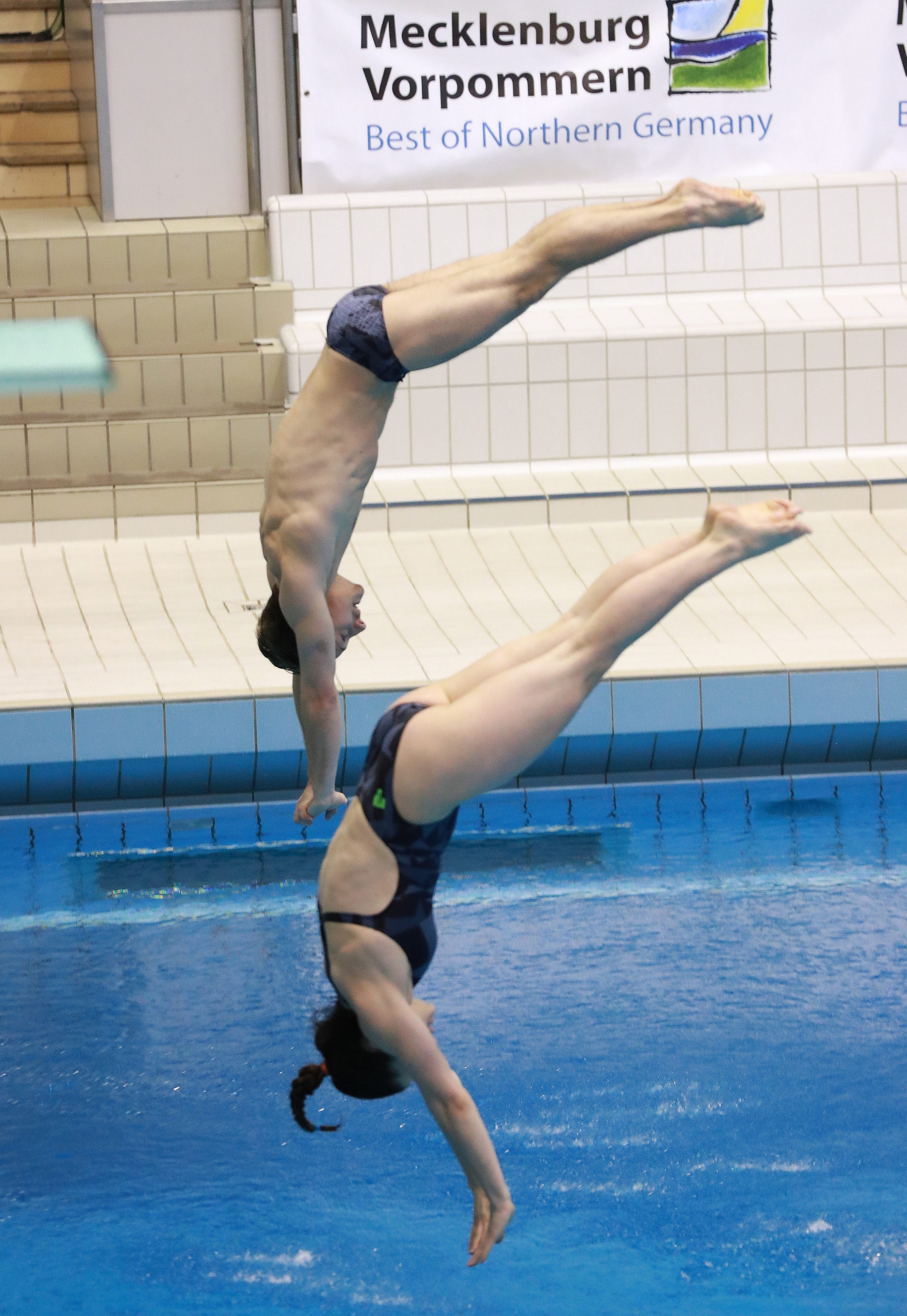
A man and woman in competitive swimwear during a synchronised diving event

Standard everyday clothing is usually impractical for swimming and is unsafe under some circumstances. Most cultures today expect swimmers to wear proper swimsuits in public swimming pools and swimming events.

Male swimsuits (also known as swim trunks) commonly resemble shorts or briefs. Casual swimsuits (for example, boardshorts) are not always skintight, unlike competitive swimwear like jammers or diveskins. In most cases, boys and men swim with their upper bodies uncovered, except for practical reasons such as sun protection. Briefs may be discouraged or restricted for male students and instructors in certain educational swimming contexts due to the potential for distraction or inadequacy.

Female swimsuits are generally skintight, covering the crotch and the midriff area. Female swimwear may also only cover the breasts and nipples, although this can be discouraged or restricted in contexts where swimming is the primary focus. One-piece swimsuits are generally preferred and often required for girls and women in competitive swimming or educational swimming contexts for reasons of comfort, modesty, and swimming functionality.

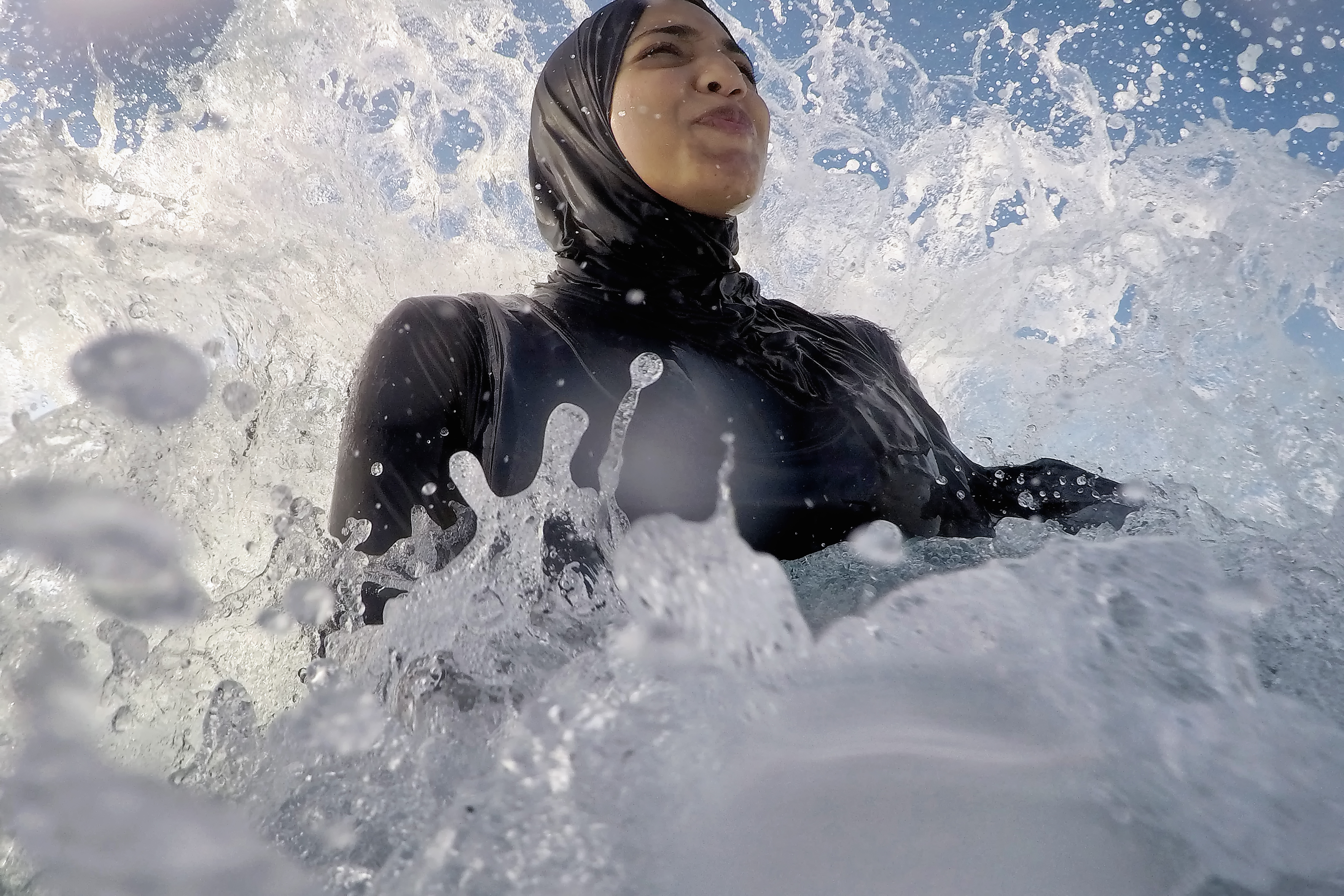
Different cultures have different standards for swimsuits. In Muslim communities, women may choose to wear burkinis, which offer full coverage in compliance with hijab.

Competitive swimwear is built so that the wearer can swim faster and more efficiently. Modern competitive swimwear is skintight and lightweight. There are many kinds of competitive swimwear for each gender. It is used in aquatic competitions, such as water polo, swim racing, diving, and rowing.

Wetsuits provide both thermal insulation and flotation. Many swimmers lack buoyancy in the legs. The wetsuit provides additional volume at a lower density and therefore improves buoyancy and trim while swimming. It provides insulation between the skin and water which reduces heat loss. The wetsuit is the usual choice for those who swim in cold water for long periods of time, as it reduces susceptibility to hypothermia.

Some people also choose to wear no clothing while swimming. In some European countries public pools allow clothes-free swimming and many countries have beaches where one can swim naked. It is legal to swim naked in the sea at all UK beaches. It was common for males to swim naked in a public setting up to the early 20th century. Today, swimming naked can be a rebellious activity or merely a casual one.

=== Accessories ===
- Earplugs can prevent water from getting in the ears.
- Noseclips can prevent water from getting in the nose. However, using noseclips in competitive swimming can cause disadvantage, so many competitive swimmers choose not to use one. For this reason, noseclips are primarily used for synchronized swimming and recreational swimming along with the backstroke.
- Goggles protect the eyes from chlorinated water, and improve underwater visibility. Tinted goggles protect the eyes from sunlight that reflects from the bottom of the pool.
- Swim caps keep the body streamlined and protect the hair from chlorinated water, though they are not entirely watertight.
- Kickboards are used to keep the upper body afloat while exercising the lower body.
- Pull buoys are used to keep the lower body afloat while exercising the upper body.
- Swimfins are used in training to elongate the kick and improve technique and speed. Fins also build upper calf muscles and improve ankle flexibility. Fins provide a significantly greater and more efficient conversion of muscle power to thrust than available from the feet, and allow the powerful leg muscles to be used effectively for propulsion through water. The value of fins as an active aid in the teaching, learning and practice of swimming has long been recognised. In the US, as early as 1947, they were used experimentally to build the confidence of reluctant beginners in swimming, while a 1950 YMCA lifesaving and water safety manual reminded swimming instructors how "flippers can be used to great advantage for treading water, surface diving, towing, underwater searching and supporting a tired swimmer". In 1967, research was conducted on fin use in teaching the crawl stroke. During the 1970s, the so-called "flipper-float" method came into vogue in Europe with the aim of helping beginners learn to swim faster and more safely.
- Hand paddles are used to increase resistance during arm movements, with the goal of improving technique and power.
- Finger paddles have a similar effect to hand paddles, but create less resistance due to their smaller size. They also help with improving a swimmer's 'catch' in the water.
- Snorkels are used to help improve and maintain a good head position in the water. They may also be used by some during physical therapy.
- Pool noodles are used to keep the user afloat during the time in the water.
- Safety fencing and equipment is mandatory at public pools and a zoning requirement at most residential pools in the United States.
- Swimming parachutes are used in competitive training, adding an element of resistance in the water to help athletes to increase power in the stroke's central movements.
- Inflatable armbands are swimming aids designed to provide buoyancy and help the wearer to float.

== See also ==
- Aquatic ape hypothesis
- Aquatic locomotion
- List of swimmers
- List of water sports
- Microswimmer
- Mixed bathing
- Resistance swimming
- Stunt swimming
- Swimhiking
- Swimming machine
- Total Immersion
- Winter swimming
- Broucheterre Swimming Pool

== Bibliography ==
- Cox, Lynne (2005). Swimming to Antarctica: Tales of a Long-Distance Swimmer. Harvest Books. ISBN 978-0-15-603130-1.
- Maniscalco F., Il nuoto nel mondo greco romano, Naples 1993.
- Mehl H., Antike Schwimmkunst, Munchen 1927.
- Schuster G., Smits W. & Ullal J., Thinkers of the Jungle. Tandem Verlag 2008.
- Sprawson, Charles (2000). Haunts of the Black Masseur - The Swimmer as Hero. University of Minnesota Press. ISBN 978-0-8166-3539-9.svin
- Tarpinian, Steve (1996). The Essential Swimmer. The Lyons Press. ISBN 978-1-55821-386-9.
- WebMD. (n.d.). Health benefits of swimming. WebMD. https://www.webmd.com/fitness-exercise/a-z/swimming-for-fitness
- "The Benefits of Swimming," Swim England
- Swimming and Arthritis," Arthritis Foundatio
- Water Safety Tips," American Red Cross
- Water Safety," Safe Kids Worldwide
