= Pool float =

Device used to keep someone above water

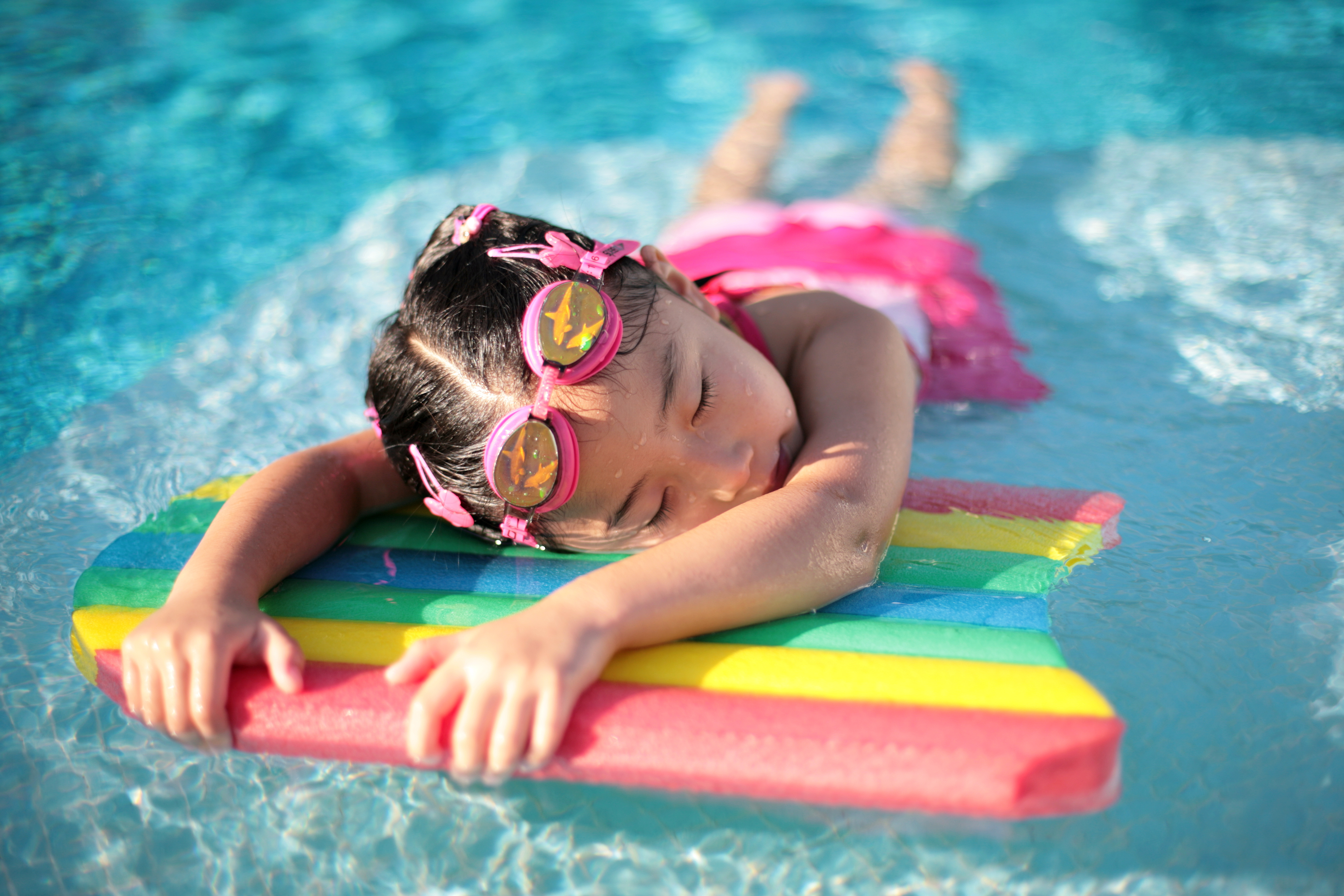
A young girl holding onto a kickboard in a swimming pool

A swimming float, commonly known as pool float or floaty, is a device used for toddlers or other very young children who are beginning to learn how to swim, or during exercise for therapeutic or training purposes. These devices, which come in many shapes and types, are used to aid them with buoyancy, or for floating on for fun.

The most common floats for children and adults are inflatable rings (in the middle of which the user swims) and inflatable armbands (placed around the user's arms). After being inflated through a valve, they are much less dense than water because they are composed mainly of air, surrounded by a thin layer of synthetic material.

Float-assisted swimming can be more difficult than free swimming, because if the float is held in front of the swimmer a more vigorous workout for the legs is given as the swimmer's weight is propelled solely by the legs, and vice versa for the arms.

== Swimming board ==
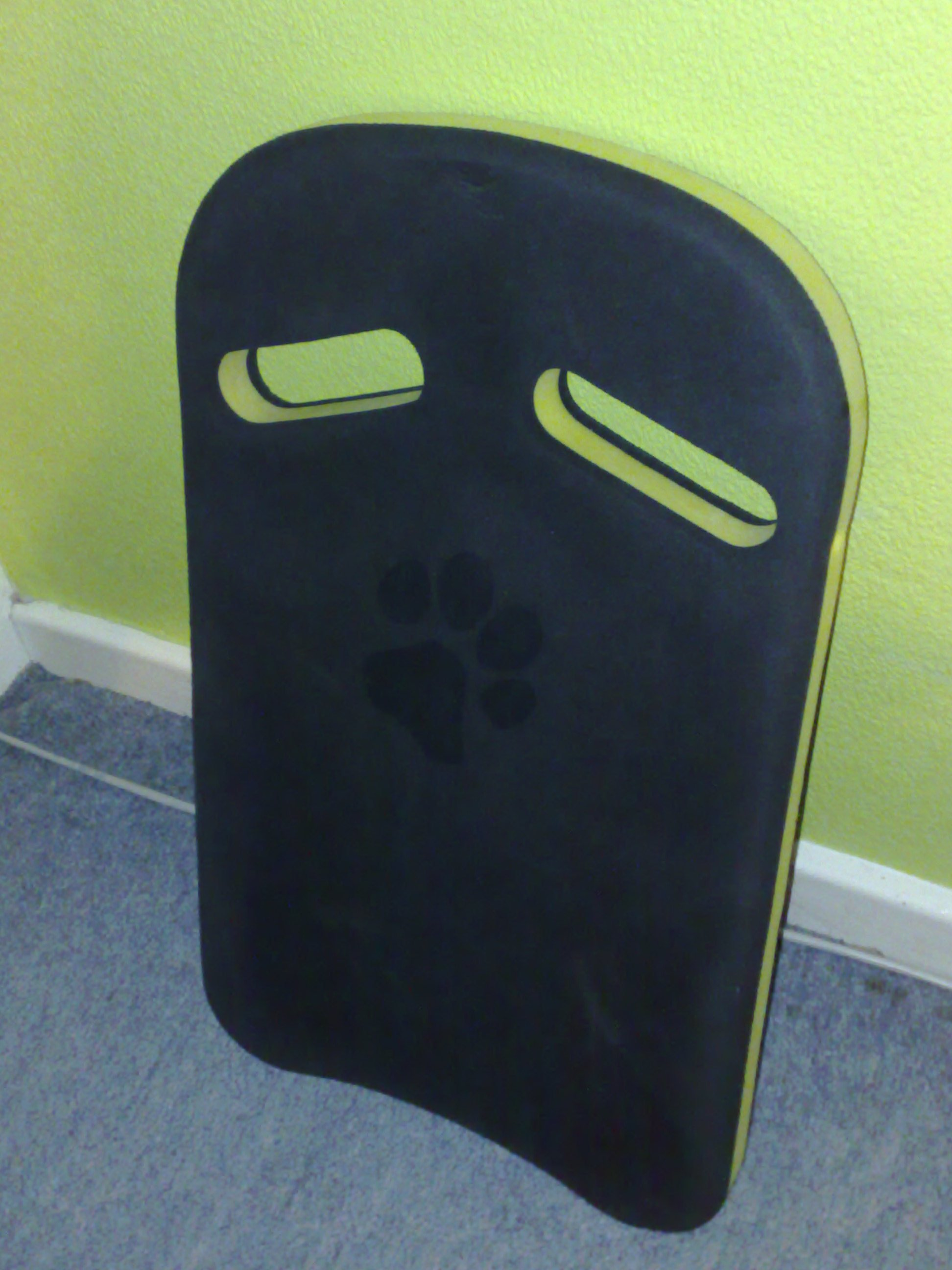
A standard EVA foam kickboard

Swimming boards (often referred to as kickboards or flutter boards) are a flotation aid used for fun or to develop a swimmer's kicking action. They can be used on all strokes but are primarily used on Freestyle, Butterfly stroke and Breaststroke.

Swimmers of all ability can use them. Young swimmers can develop their kicking action while elite swimmers can refine their kick. They are also used to strengthen a swimmers' legs.

=== Construction ===
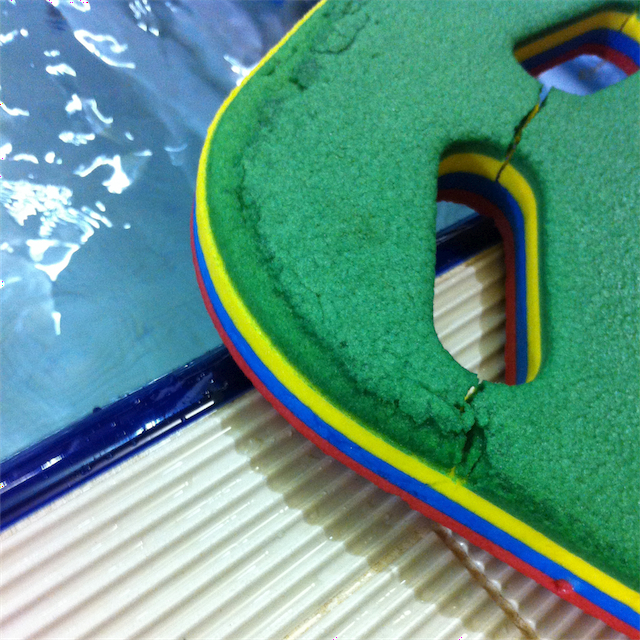
Worn foam kickboard

Kickboards are usually made from EVA foam. Some are made of more durable HDPE. The EVA foam boards can break easily and become very worn after long use, meaning the board can slowly disintegrate over time.

=== Variations ===
There are some variations of kickboards from the traditional form with two hand grips. Some can be used as a kickboard and a pull buoy. These are often oddly shaped so they can be used for both of the training aspects.

== Other floats ==
Especially-large floats can be used as seats to float or sit on top of a pool for the user to stand on top in the manner of a raft.

A variation known as the "pool noodle" is a long, thin cylinder, measuring 3–5 feet (90–150 cm) long and 3 inches (8 cm) in diameter, sometimes with a hollow core. It can be used to aid in floating or stretching exercises.

A pull buoy or "leg float" is used to focus exercise on the arms.

Pool dumbbells are used for strength training where muscles push down against buoyancy. This is the opposite of conventional dumbbells, which are used to force muscles to pull up, against gravity.

== See also ==
- Air mattress
- Inflatable armbands
- Lifebuoy
- List of inflatable manufactured goods
- Personal flotation device
- Swim ring
