= Hand paddle =

Plastic plate worn on the hand by swimmers during training

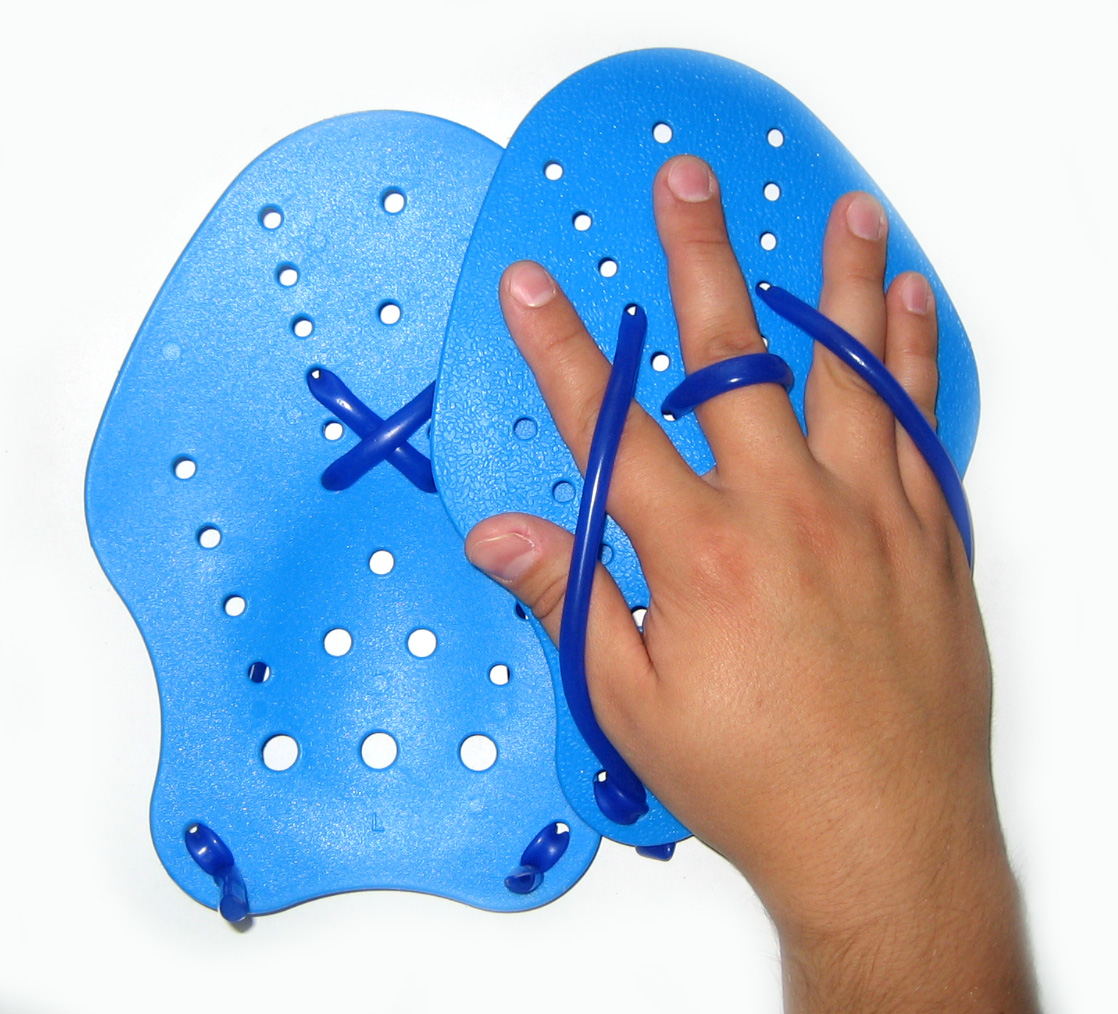
Example of a hand paddle

A hand paddle is a device worn by swimmers during training. It consists of a plastic plate worn over the swimmer's palm and attached over the back of the swimmer's hand with elastic cords. The plate is often perforated with a pattern of holes.

A handle paddle increases the resistance the hand experiences as it tries to move through the water during the effective part of the arm stroke – the part of the stroke described as the "pull". This gives the swimmer considerably more forward propulsion from the arm stroke than does a naked hand, and affords an enhanced kinesthetic "feel" of the pull. It also enhances the swimmer's feel of the "catch", the phase prior to the pull, where the hand turns from a streamlined position to grasp the water and begin the pull. If the hand catches or pulls at an incorrect angle, the increased resistance afforded by the hand paddle will exacerbate the resultant twisting moment, making the defect clearer to the swimmer. The considerably increased load imposed by the hand paddle on the arm and shoulder can, however, lead to pain and an increased risk of injury, so coaches advise only limited use of paddles and that use be discontinued if the swimmer feels shoulder pain.

To make the most out of using paddles, it is important to ensure that they aid in establishing a good technique under the water. Use the paddles without the wrist strap or side straps, and only use the main finger holds in the middle, regardless of the brand.

Paddles are often used with pull buoys to build up arm strength.

== History ==
The hand paddle was invented by Benjamin Franklin in the 18th century.

== Types of paddles ==
Different types of paddles include:

- Finger paddles – Designed to fit on the fingers and built for all strokes, butterfly, backstroke, breaststroke and freestyle.
- Freestyle Paddles – Designed especially for swimmers swimming freestyle.
- Biomimetic Hand Paddles – Influenced by the darkling beetle to reinforce kinesthetic feel for the water.
- Han's Paddles – The original holed swimming paddles.
- Speedo Original Hand Paddles – One of the first and made for most strokes.
- Sculling and Vortex paddles – Designed to build upper body strength.
- Forearm paddles - Designed to extend past the palm of the hand over the forearm to help with the initial catch
- Anti-paddles - Designed with a conical shape on the bottom of the paddle to improves swimmer's reaction to water resistance
