= Swim ring =

Inflatable water toy

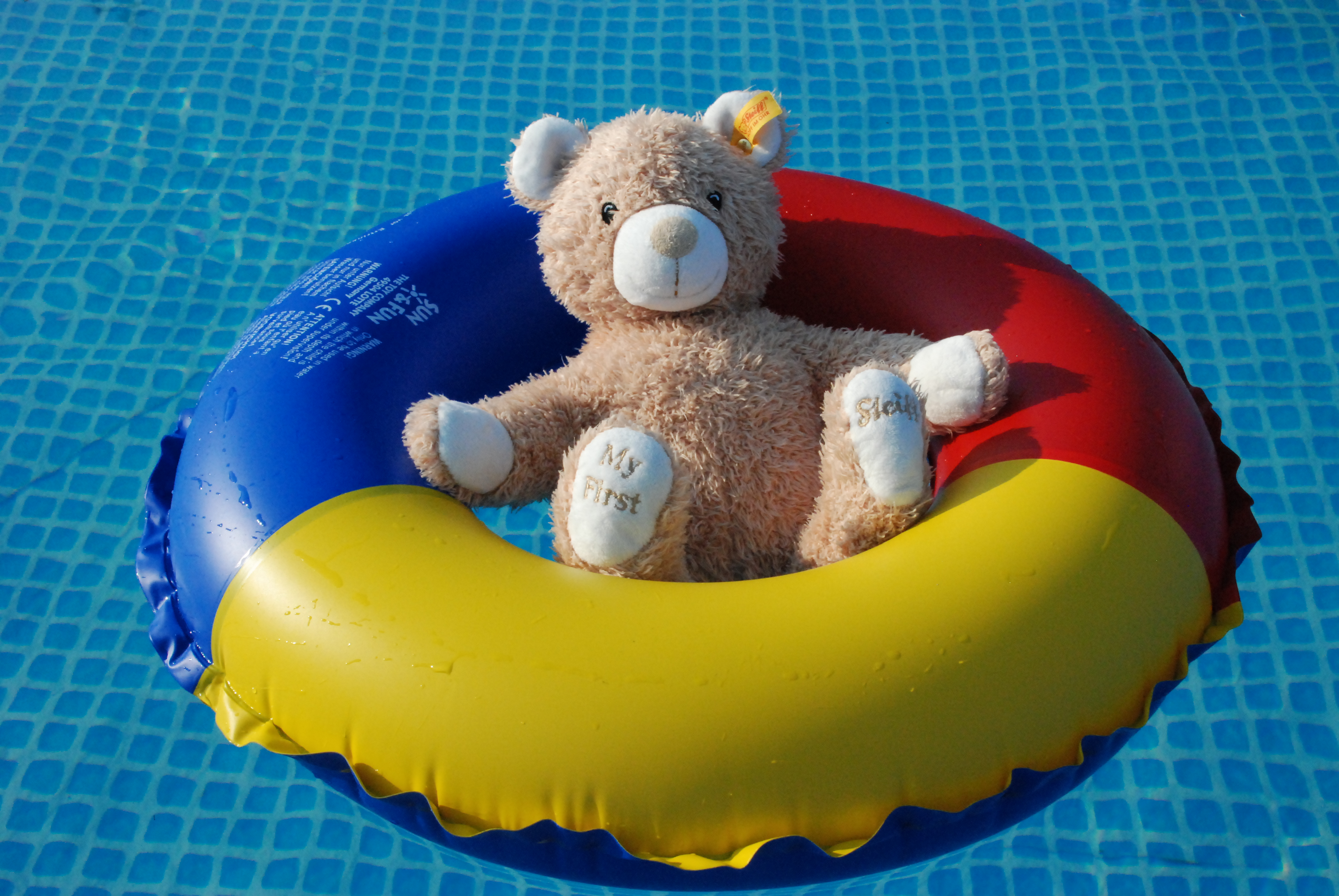
Child size

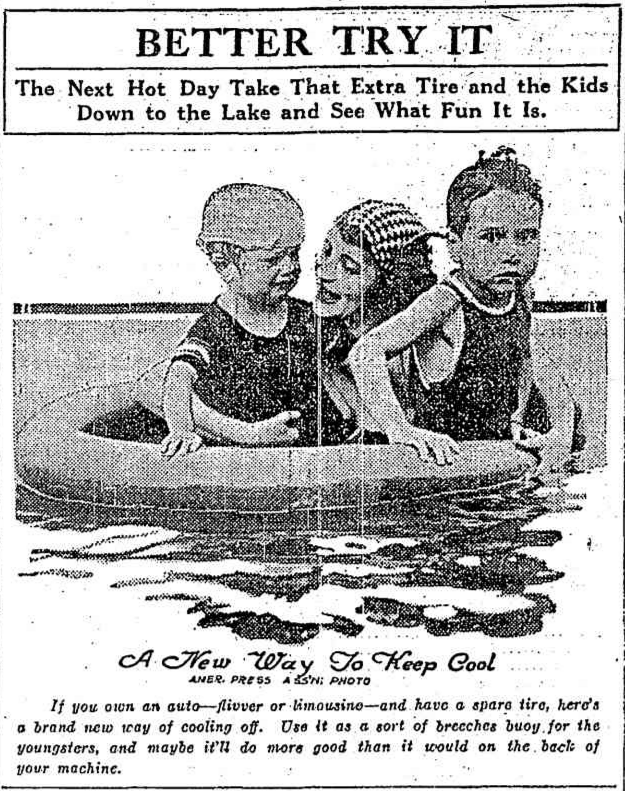
A vehicle inner tube being used as a swim ring in 1916

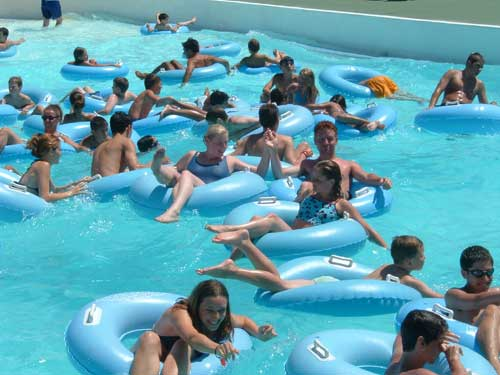
Tubes on the water

A swim ring (also known as a swimming ring, swim tube, rubber ring, water donut, floatie, inner tube, or, in the United States, a lifesaver) is a toroid-shaped (hence the name "ring" or "doughnut") inflatable water toy.

The swim ring was derived from the inner tube, the inflatable inner part of older vehicle tires. The inner tube, when inflated, was used as a water toy, and as a floating object to lounge on.

== Usage ==
Swim rings are inflated with air and worn around the user's torso, usually just under the arms, or sat upon, to hold the user above the water. They come in a variety of sizes to fit children through adults, though the larger sizes are often called "swim tubes" or just "tubes".

At water parks, these are commonly used on water slides, with a person sitting in the center of the ring, legs and body leaning over the sides. Some designs even appear as more than one tube sewn together and include 2 or 4 holes so that more than one rider can fit comfortably.

Although similar in appearance to a lifebuoy, a swim ring is not designed to save individuals from drowning.

== Structure ==
A swim ring consists of two identically sized layers of flat plastic, one of which contains a valve for inflation and deflation. Each layer is circular with a circular hole in the middle. The two layers are joined at their inner and outer edges, sealing an air chamber inside.

== Variants ==
Animal-shaped rings sometimes include an additional air chamber in the shape of a forward-facing animal head on the upper side of the ring, with more complex designs also featuring further chambers to represent limbs, tails, wings, etc. These additional air chambers may join directly to the main ring air chamber, or consist of an independent air chamber with its own contained valve.

A variety of colorful shapes and designs have been produced over time, ranging from popular characters to water-related animals (for example flamingos, swans, sea creatures), as well as fantasy creatures such as dragons and unicorns. Although usually small and mostly popular among children, these animal-shaped swim rings have also started appearing in much larger, adult-size designs since 2015, also proving popular with adults after many famous personalities posted pictures featuring them on social media.

There are also variant forms like boat and fish available.

Other swim ring designs include buoyancy aids such as baby swim neck rings.

== See also ==
- Air mattress
- Beach
- Inflatable armbands
- Inner tube
- Lifebuoy
- List of inflatable manufactured goods
- Personal flotation device
- Swimming float
- Tubing (recreation)
