= Inflatable armbands =

Objects designed to help a wearer float in water

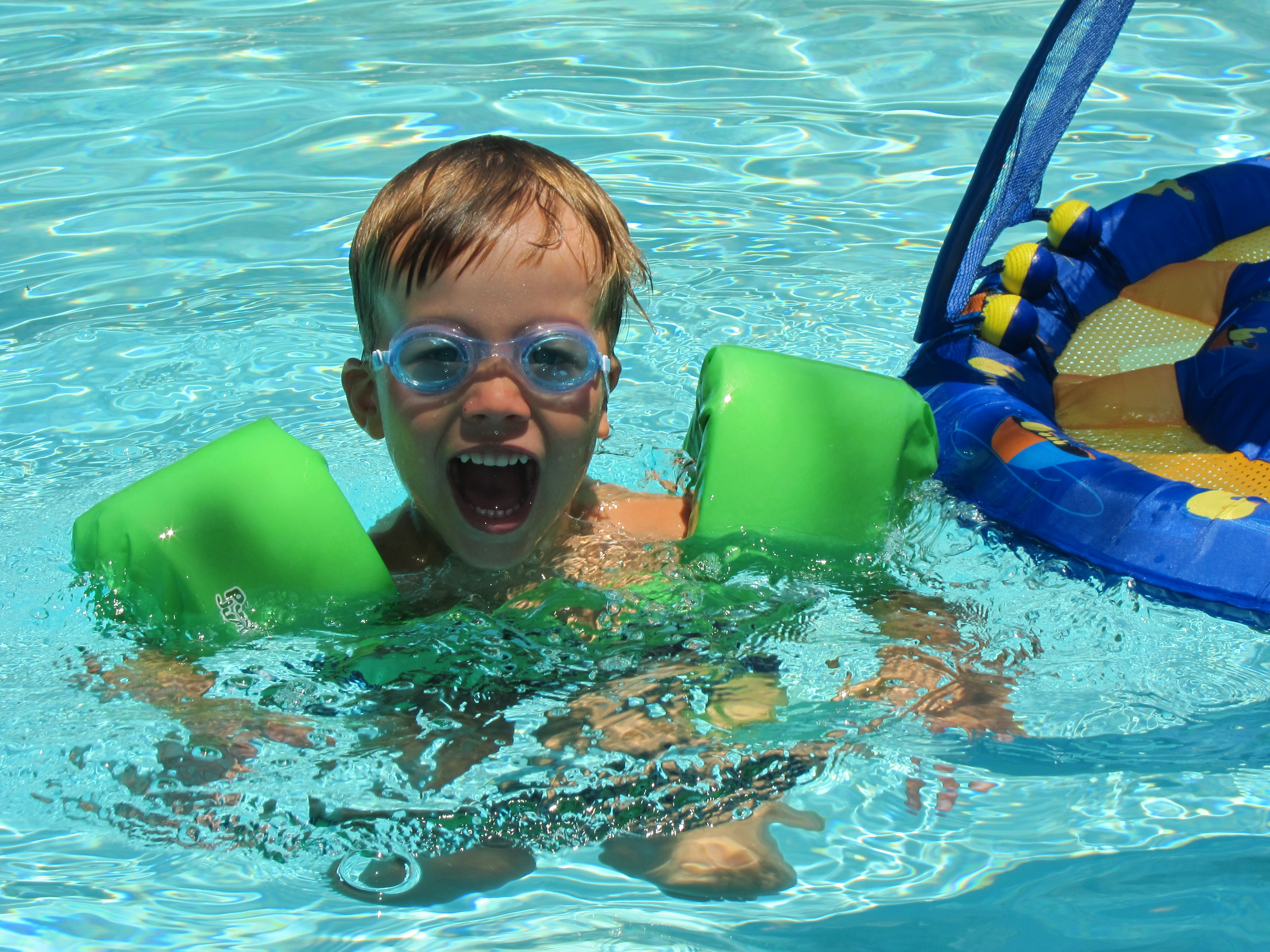
A child swimming with inflatable armbands

Inflatable armbands, usually referred to as simply armbands, water wings, swimmies, or floaties, are swim aids designed to help a wearer float in water and learn to swim.

Inflatable armbands are typically cylindrical, inflatable plastic bands that are inflated and worn on the upper arms. When the wearer is in water, the air inside the armbands provides buoyancy, helping the wearer float. Although often thought of as a swimming aid for children, armbands are also available in adult sizes.

== Advantages ==
Inflatable armbands are inexpensive, easy to find, and durable. They can help children to build confidence and learn to swim earlier. The amount of flotation provided can be decreased by deflating them partially. During swimming lessons, children may do better in difficult lessons and be easier to supervise if they wear armbands.

== Criticism ==
Despite their popularity, some swimming experts advise against using inflatable armbands. Although they can help a child to float, they can slip off and lead to drowning. Inflatable armbands are not a life-saving device, and mistaking them for one can create a dangerous false sense of security. Additionally, inflatable armbands teach children to float in a vertical position, which is incorrect because swimming is usually done in a prone position. Children who wear armbands can become dependent on them, as well.

== Safety standards ==
National safety standards such as BS EN 13138-3:2007 in the United Kingdom require inflatable armbands to conform to certain standards, like puncture resistance and the level of buoyancy retained after a period of time beyond the inflation valve being opened and left open. This is an assessment of the efficiency of non-return valves designed to prevent the armbands from deflating suddenly if an inflation valve comes open. Standards also require prominent labelling near the inflation valves stating that inflatable armbands are not life preservers and should only be used under competent supervision. Supervisors should be in the water within an arm's reach of the person wearing inflatable armbands.

== History ==
There are several historical devices that had similar purposes as inflatable armbands.

In 1907, swimming became part of the school curriculum in England and caused parents to become more concerned with their children's safety in the water. In response to parents' worries, the Dean's Rag Book Company, London, introduced the Swimeesy Buoy, inflatable armbands with a colorful design that looked like the wings of a butterfly. A plain white version was also available. The product became so popular that it was available, almost unchanged, until the outbreak of World War II.

In October 1931, a design for water wings appeared in the magazine Modern Mechanix. They were made of rubber, consisted of two parts, were worn on the upper arms, and inflated through a valve. They were first demonstrated in public on the beaches of Los Angeles, California, USA.

A similar design of inflatable armbands for swimmers was invented by Bernhard Markwitz in Hamburg, Germany. In 1956, Markwitz's three-year-old daughter fell into a goldfish pond and nearly drowned. As a result, Markwitz invented and developed a swimming aid that would be safer for children than swimming rings, which at the time, were made of cork. A lottery win of 253,000 Deutsche Marks gave him a suitable start capital. In 1964, Markwitz developed the armbands in their final form and marketed them under the name "BEMA". They remain popular in Germany to this day.

== See also ==
- Lifebuoy
- List of inflatable manufactured goods
- Personal flotation device
- Swimming float
- Swim ring
