= Broucheterre Swimming Pool =

Building in Charleroi, Belgium

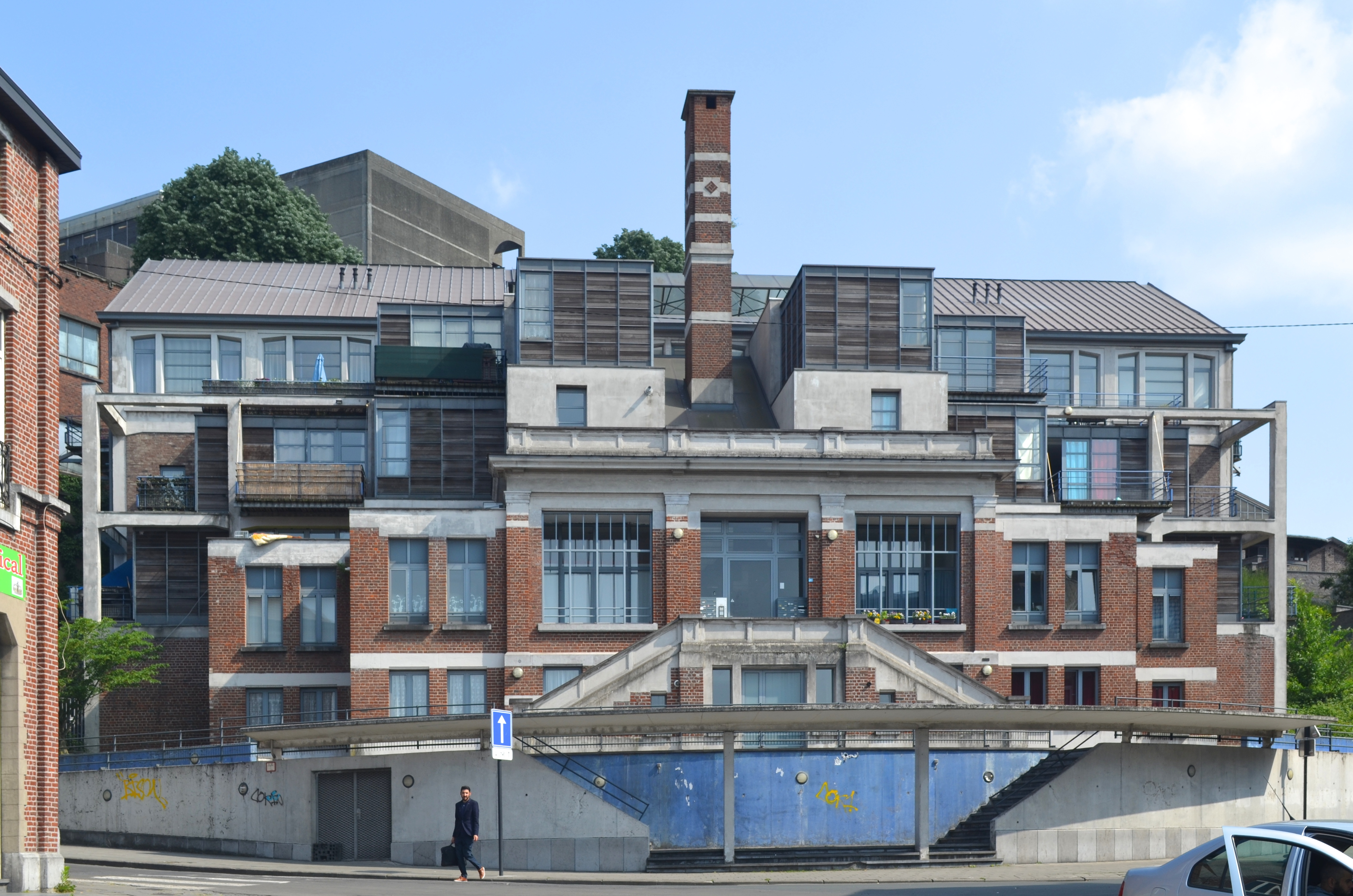
- Building seen from Place de la Broucheterre.
- Location: Averroès Street; 6000 Charleroi, Hainaut; Belgium
- Coordinates: 50°25′04″N 4°26′45″E
- Type: Public housing
- Beginning date: 1932
- Restored date: 2001-2002
- Dedicated to: Swimming pool (1932–1984), social housing (since 2003)

The Broucheterre Swimming Pool is a social housing building in Charleroi, Belgium. Designed by architect Oscar Quinaut in the Art Deco style, it was constructed in 1932 on the site of the former 1911 Charleroi Exhibition. The building originally contained a public swimming pool, replacing an earlier basin along the Sambre River.

The Broucheterre Swimming Pool was decommissioned in 1984 as it did not meet current safety and hygiene standards. It was replaced by the Hélios swimming pool in Charleroi Lower Town. The building was subsequently abandoned but was occasionally used by Charleroi/Danses for performances and student initiation events.

The Broucheterre Swimming Pool building was converted into social housing in 2002, following plans initiated in the late 1990s. Architects Pierre Blondel and Thomas Vandenberghe designed 33 apartments along the building's sides, preserving the central space for circulation and natural light. The former pool basin was transformed into a garden, utilizing the skylight-covered patio.

== History ==
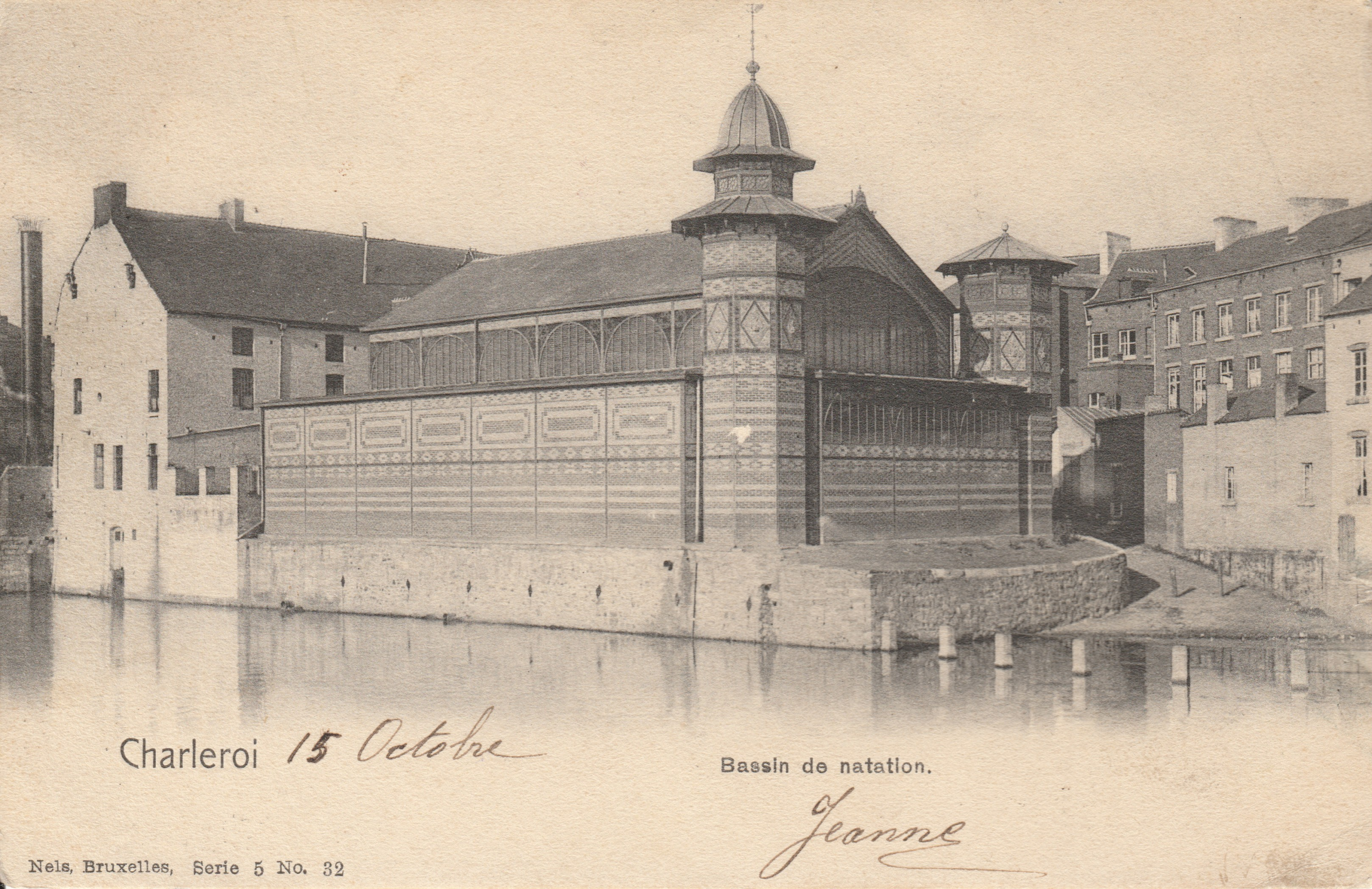
The old swimming pool located on the banks of the Sambre River. Postcard postmarked in 1909

On December 17, 1928, the College presented a major public works program to the elected officials of the Charleroi Municipal Council. (Note: This refers to the city before the municipal merger in Belgium in 1977.) Among the proposed projects was the construction of a new swimming pool. This facility was intended to replace an earlier pool that was to be removed due to the infilling of a branch of the Sambre River and the planned development of a new boulevard in its place. The previous pool, built in 1900, no longer met contemporary standards. By the 1930s, swimming had become an increasingly popular activity in the region, necessitating the construction of a modern facility with updated amenities and adequate capacity.

The Broucheterre Swimming Pool was constructed at the intersection of Averroès Street (Note: Named Gendebien Street at the time of construction.) and Mambourg Street in Charleroi, Belgium, near the Université du Travail, on a site previously part of the 1911 Charleroi Exhibition. Located where the upper plateau meets Broucheterre Square, the land was acquired by the Province of Hainaut in 1910 and transferred to the City of Charleroi in 1930, when construction began. The province funded half the project cost. The pool was inaugurated on April 30, 1932. The inauguration will be marked by festivities, including a ball hosted by François Lahoussée's orchestra. (Note: François Lahoussée was a popular figure in Charleroi. In 1957, one of the city's giants was created in his likeness.)

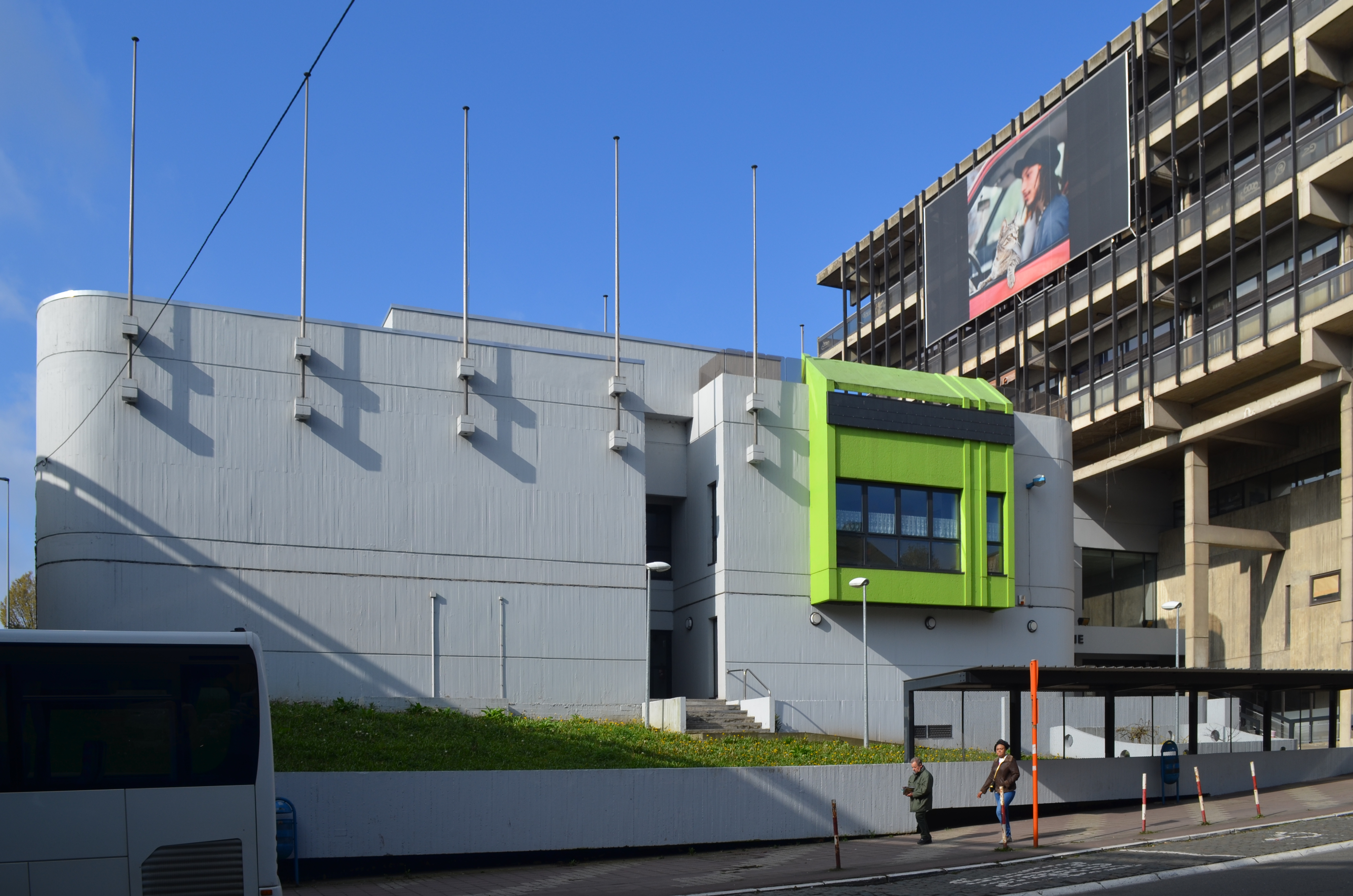
Main façade of the Hélios swimming pool

The Broucheterre Swimming Pool was decommissioned in 1984, after the construction of the Hélios pool in 1976. Having served for 50 years, it no longer met safety and hygiene standards and ceased operations.

After its decommissioning, the Broucheterre Swimming Pool building was abandoned and deteriorated. It was occasionally used by Charleroi/Danses for performances and student events. Proposed uses, such as a nightclub or permanent base for Charleroi/Danses, were deemed impractical. A 1994 performance, Ex Machina by Frédéric Flamand, influenced future considerations, favoring cultural or social repurposing.

Following a meeting with Claude Despiegeleer, then president of the social housing company La Carolorégienne, architect Pierre Blondel developed a project to convert the former swimming pool into residential housing. The project remained inactive until 1997, when it was reinitiated by the Walloon Region in collaboration with the social housing company.

The initial study proposed the construction of 32 to 40 studio and apartment units.

Between 2001 and 2002, the former pool was converted into 33 social housing units by architects Pierre Blondel and Thomas Vandenberghe.

== Architecture ==
=== Swimming pool ===
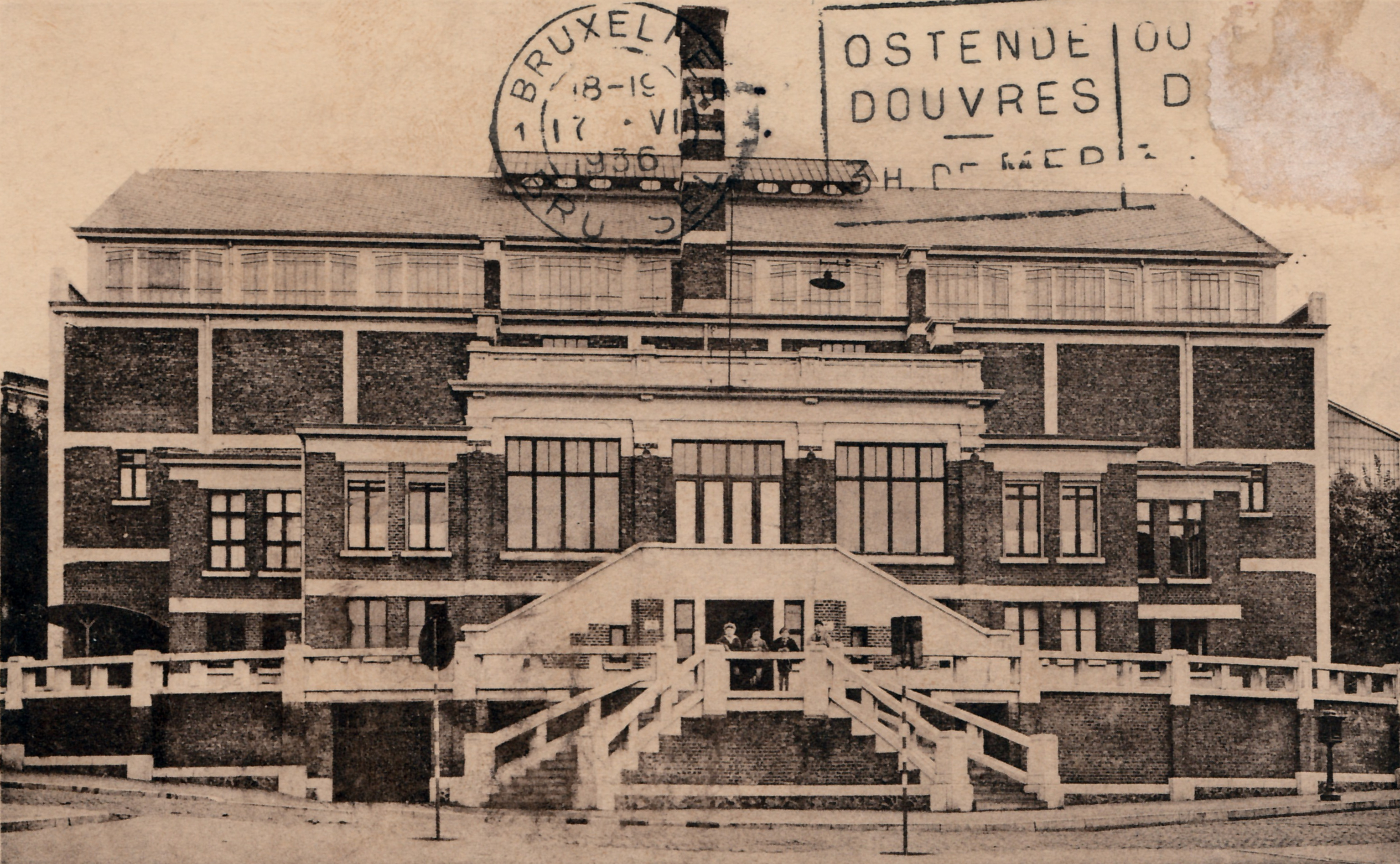
Swimming pool. Postcard postmarked in 1936

The swimming pool, designed by municipal architect Oscar Quinaut, (Note: The plaques placed on the various buildings designed by the architect, as well as his signature on the plans, end his surname with the letter t. However, many written sources mistakenly indicate an x as the final letter.) was built in a functional Art Deco style.

The structure features a main hall measuring 36 by 24 meters, surrounded by a 4-meter-wide gallery and topped with a vaulted ceiling. Natural light enters the space through a band of windows located above the gallery's changing cabins.

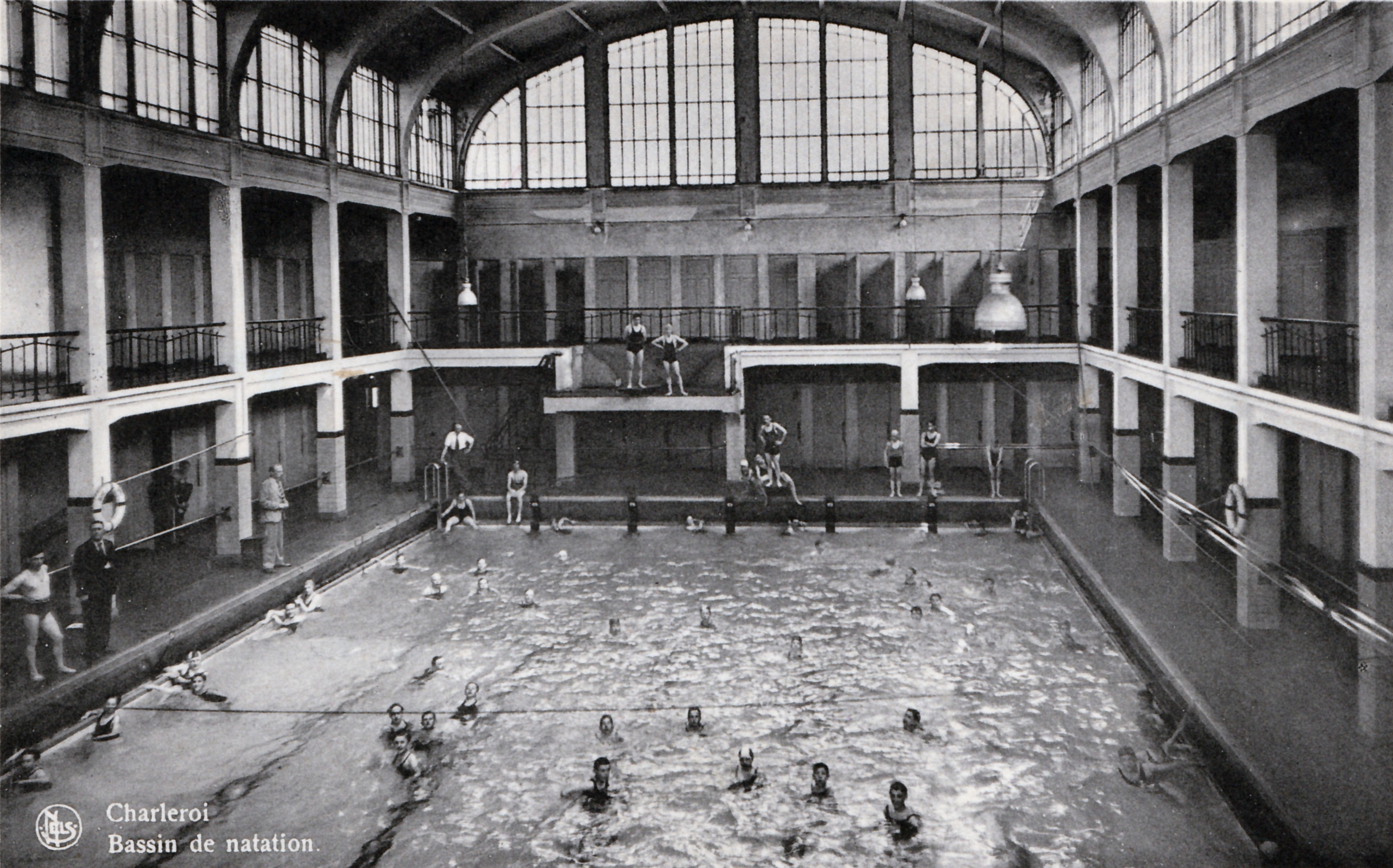
Interior view of the swimming pool around 1935

The pool itself measures 25 meters in length and 13 meters in width, with a total volume of 581.50 cubic meters. Its depth ranges from 0.7 meters at the shallow end to 2 meters at 18 meters, then increases to 3 meters over the remaining 7 meters. The water surface is positioned 60 centimeters below the deck. Two stairways provide access at the shallow end, while the deep end is equipped with diving boards at 1 and 3 meters in height. The water is maintained at 24°C with a heating system. The pool is supplied by the Jumet water network and includes equipment for decalcification, deodorization, and hair filtration.

The pool's facilities include showers, footbaths, toilets, and sinks. At the pool level, there are 62 changing cabins, with an additional 84 cabins located on the gallery level.

Beneath the main hall, a 36-meter by 5-meter room contains 16 bath-shower cabins and 17 bathtubs.

The annex buildings feature a boiler room, a laundry room with a rainwater tank, and a basement apartment for a concierge at courtyard level. Above these are the entrance hall, a waiting room, and rooms designated for laundry distribution and collection. Dedicated spaces are also provided for swimming clubs.

=== Housing ===
The conversion project led by architect Pierre Blondel in 2002 reconfigured the former swimming pool into 33 residential units. The apartments were arranged in the lateral sections of the building, utilizing the existing structural framework, which allowed for a grid measuring 4 meters in width and 12 meters in depth. The central area of the former pool basin was preserved as a patio to facilitate peripheral circulation and provide natural light. The basin itself was transformed into a garden space beneath the glass roof.

This architectural strategy enabled the creation of varied apartment layouts. Each unit includes either a terrace or an outward-facing balcony. The south-facing apartments feature double-height volumes, forming duplexes.

The housing distribution consists of 15 one-bedroom units, 6 two-bedroom units, and 12 two-bedroom duplexes.

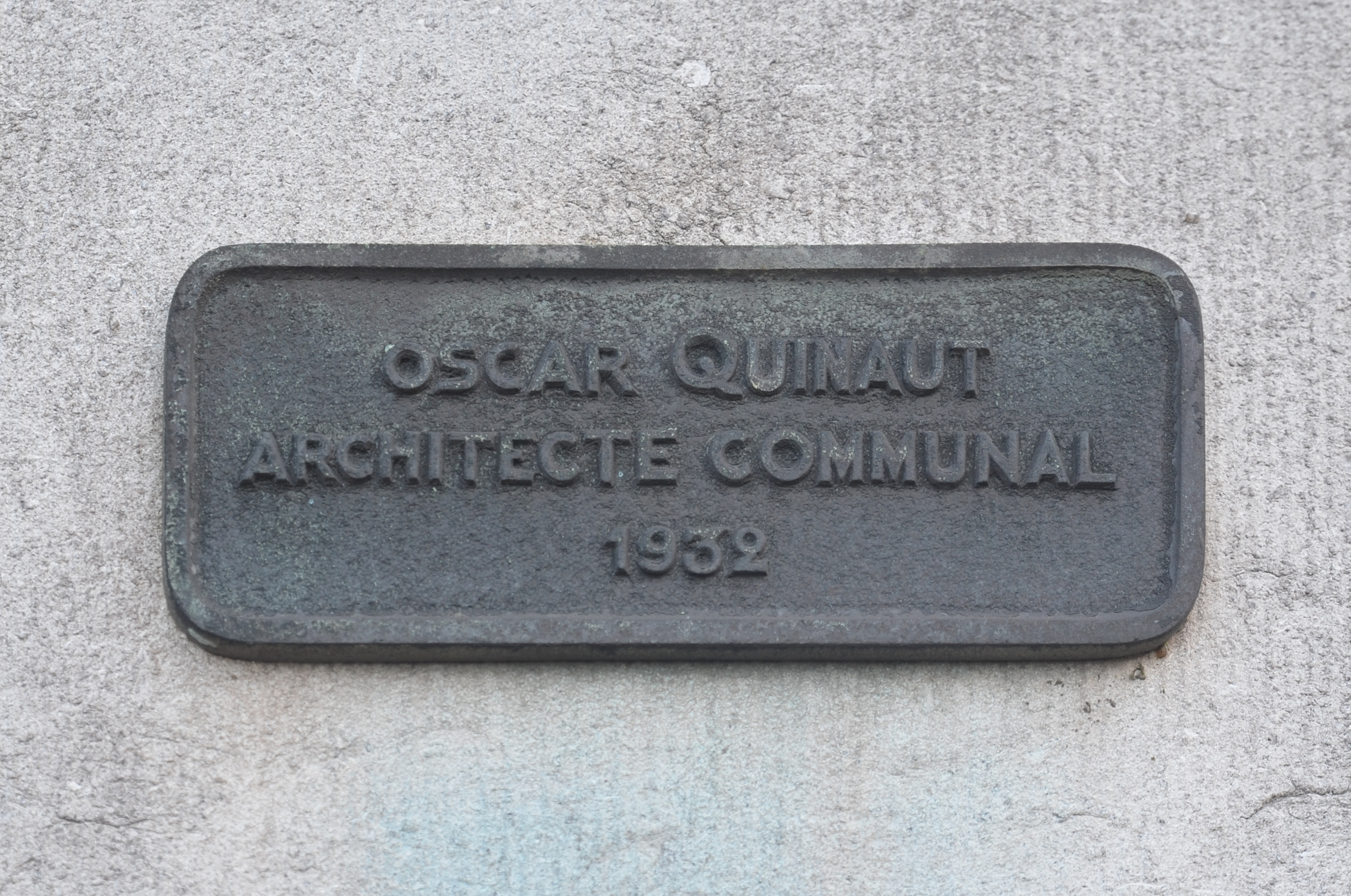
Plaque with the architect's name and date of construction.

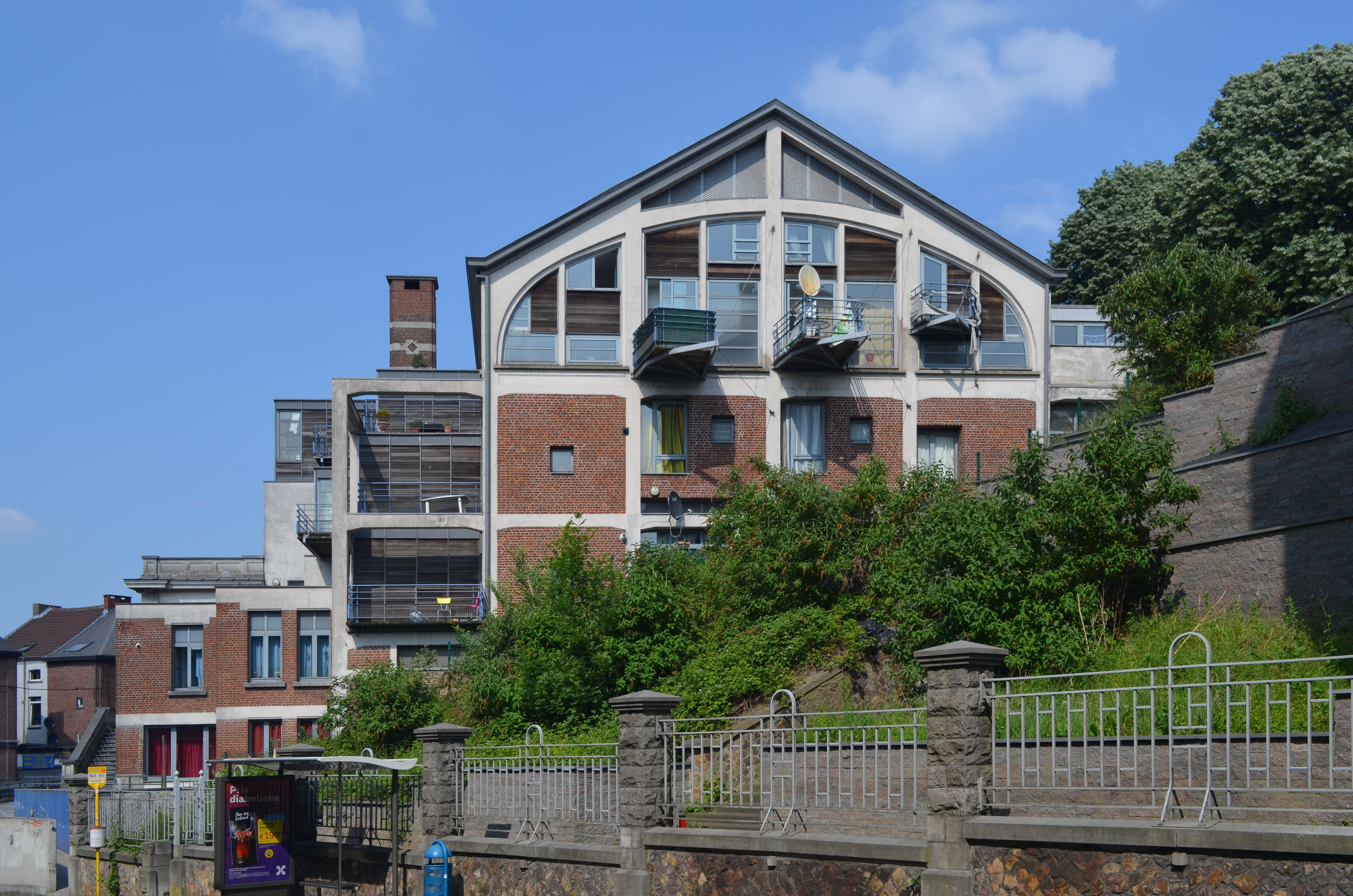
South facade.

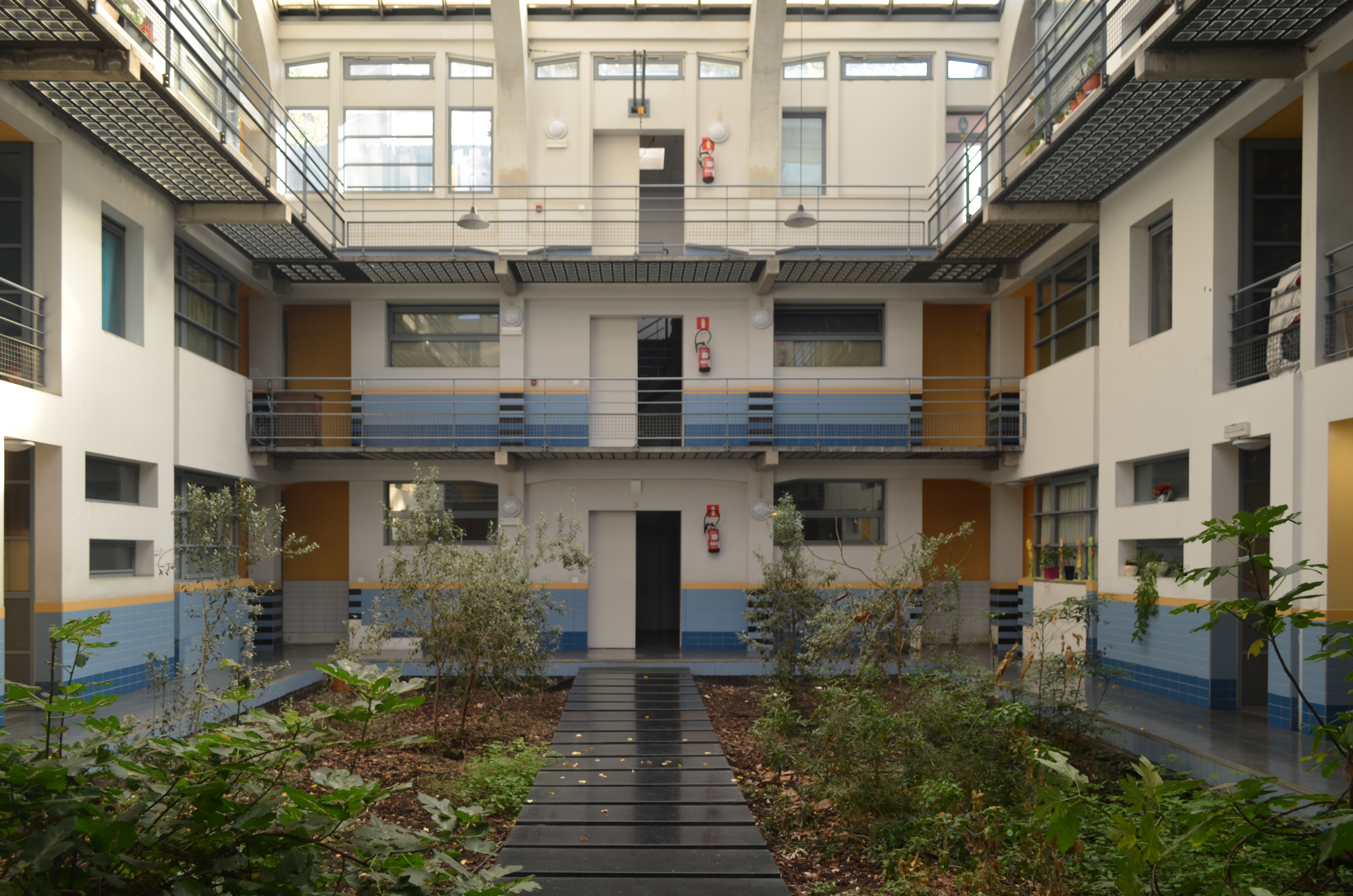
The central patio.

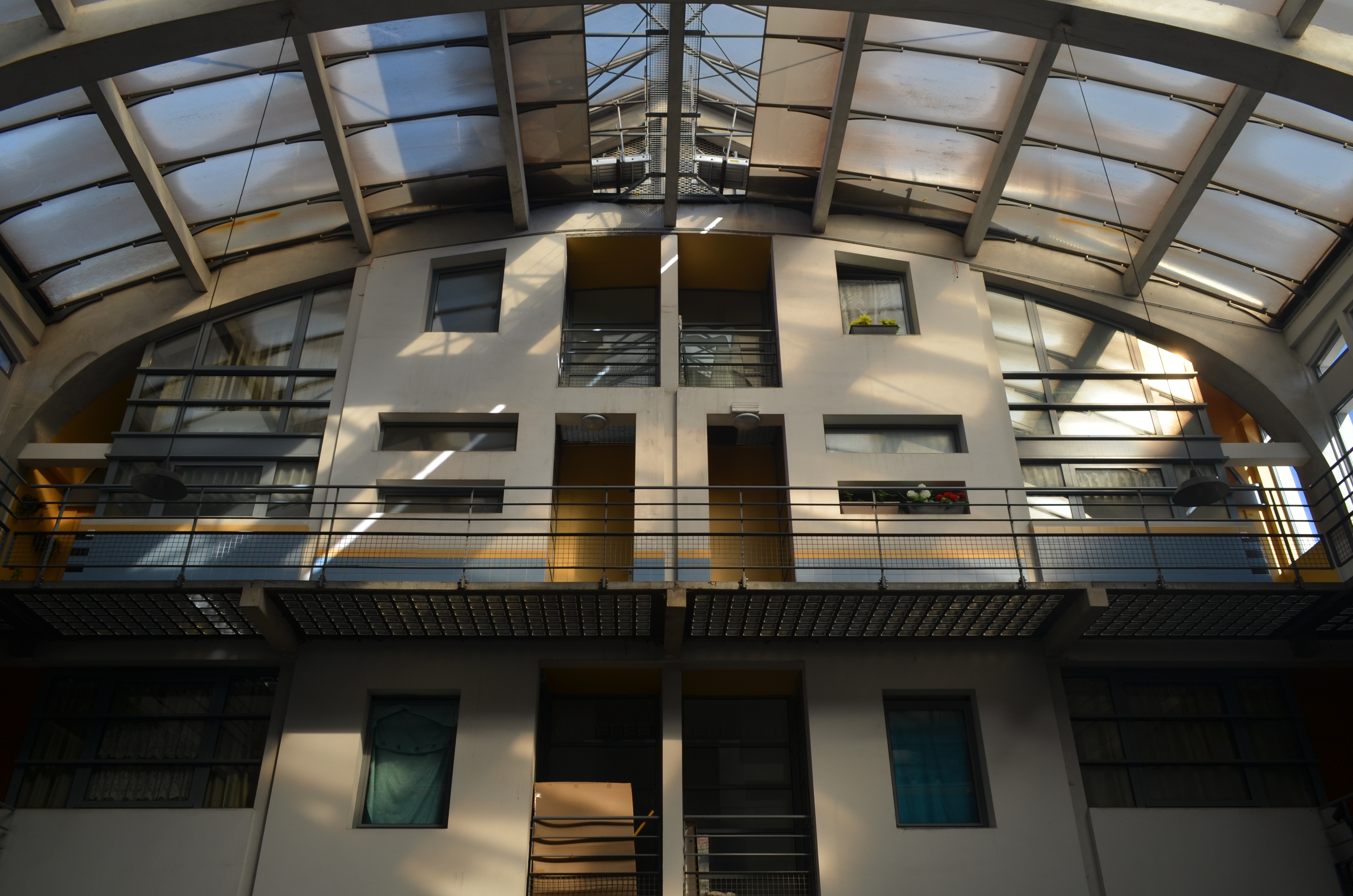
The glass roof.

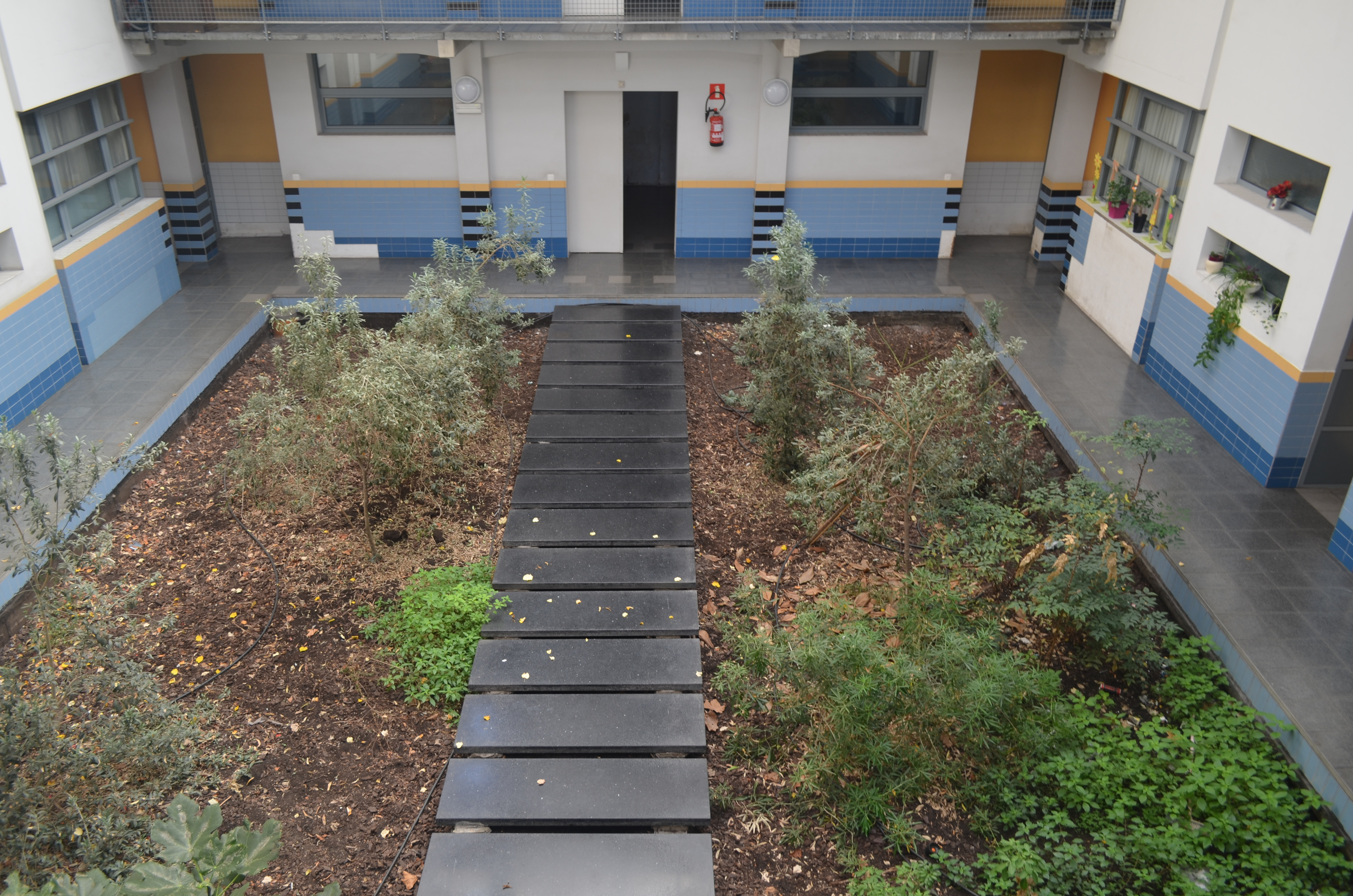
The winter garden.

== See also ==
- Public housing
- Charleroi
- Art Deco

== Bibliography ==
- Blavier, Jean (2004). "Les logements sociaux dans l'ancienne piscine de la Broucheterre à Charleroi" [Social housing in the former Broucheterre swimming pool in Charleroi]. Les cahiers de l'urbanisme (in French). 48–49: 140–145.
- Quinaut, Oscar (1930). "Construction d'un nouveau bassin de natation" [Construction of a new swimming pool]. Inauguration des grands travaux par L.L.M.M. le Roi et la Reine le dimanche 22 juin 1930 : Notices descriptives des travaux [Inauguration of major works by Their Majesties the King and Queen on Sunday, June 22, 1930: Descriptive notes on the works] (in French). Charleroi: 1930. pp. 29–31.
- Strauven, Iwan; Le Maire, Judith; Dailly, Marie-Noëlle (2017). 1881-2017 Charleroi métropole [1881–2017 Charleroi metropolitan area]. Guide d'architecture moderne et contemporaine (in French). Brussels/Paris: Mardaga. ISBN 978-2-8047-0367-7.
