= Stunt swimming =

Swimming beyond traditional strokes

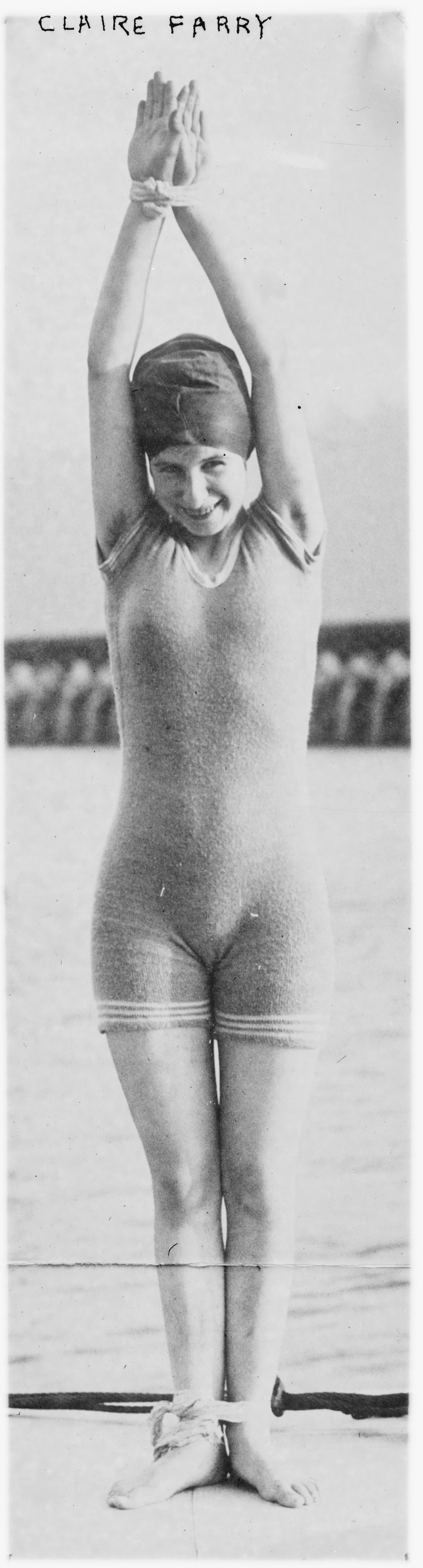
Claire Farry circa 1913 before swimming with hands tied together and feet tied together

Stunt swimming and trick swimming is swimming beyond using the traditional strokes and is usually performed for entertainment or for publicity. Synchronized swimming was one of the stunt swimming techniques that went on to become its own recognized style through the efforts of Katherine Whitney Curtis. Curtis experimented with stunt swimming in 1915 at the University of Wisconsin, under the tutelage of J.C. Steinauer, a vaudeville performer.

== Examples ==
- Jack LaLanne, performed a stunt swim on his birthday as a publicity stunt. For his 70th birthday in 1984 he pulled 70 rowboats.
