= Pull buoy =

Floatation device used in swim workouts

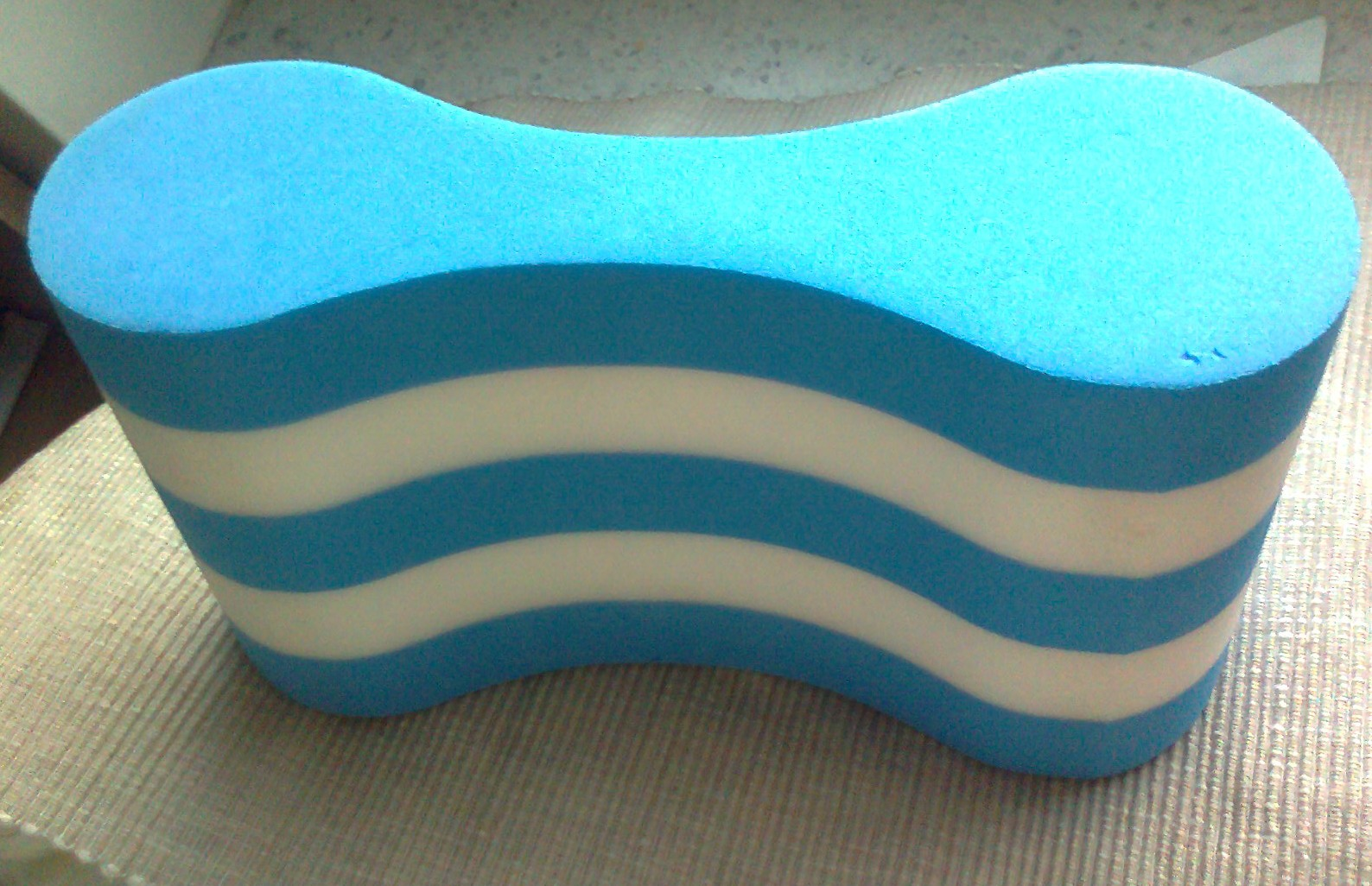
Pull buoy

A pull buoy or leg float is a figure-eight shaped piece of closed-cell foam used in swim workouts. Swimmers place the buoy between their thighs or their ankles to provide support to the body without kicking their legs; this allows the swimmer to focus on training only their arms and developing both endurance and upper body strength.

The pull buoy was originally invented by Fred Carbonero in the 1960s. Carbonero was a swim coach and created the pull buoy to add resistance in the water. He started a company called Pull Buoy in 1964.

Using the pull buoy gives the arms a more focused workout by providing flotational support for hips and legs. Good body position and technique can be established and a bilateral breathing rhythm can be refined.

The pull buoy can be combined with a rubber ring to tie one's feet together, so there is no notion of kick. It also provides individuals with heavy legs with a way to be better positioned in the water.

Pull buoy is often confused with pool buoy, particularly by those who have never seen the term written. Pull here refers to the pull phase of the swim stroke which this device helps to train. Pool buoys usually refers to the floating plastic lines used to demarcate lap lanes in a pool.
