= Henri Kuprashvili =

Georgian political scientist and swimmer

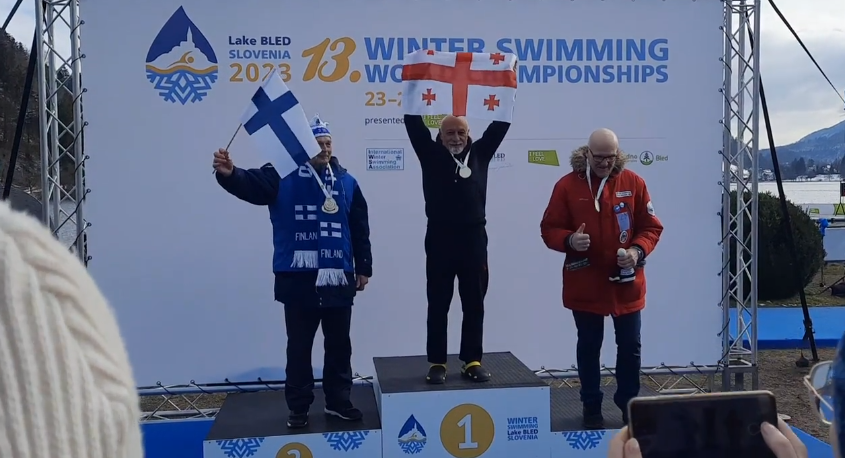
Kuprashvili (middle) in 2023

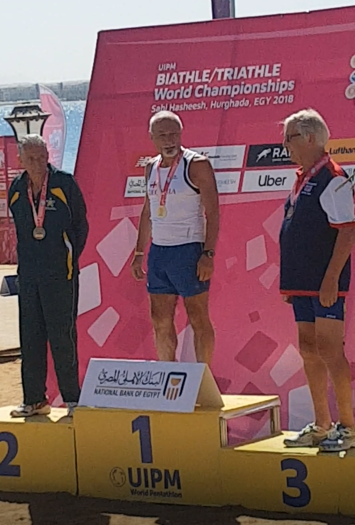
Kuprashvili (middle) in 2018

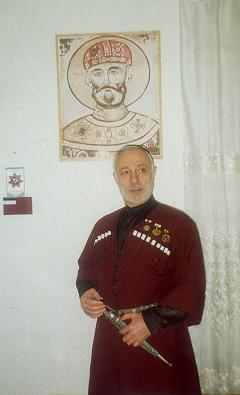
Henry Kuprashvili wearing the Chokha, part of the Georgian national dress, in 2002

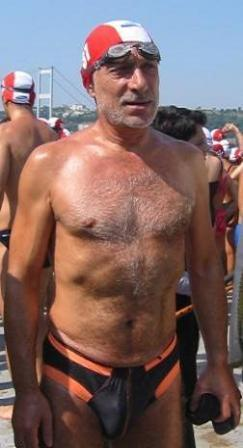
Henry Kuprashvili at the Bosphorus in 2005

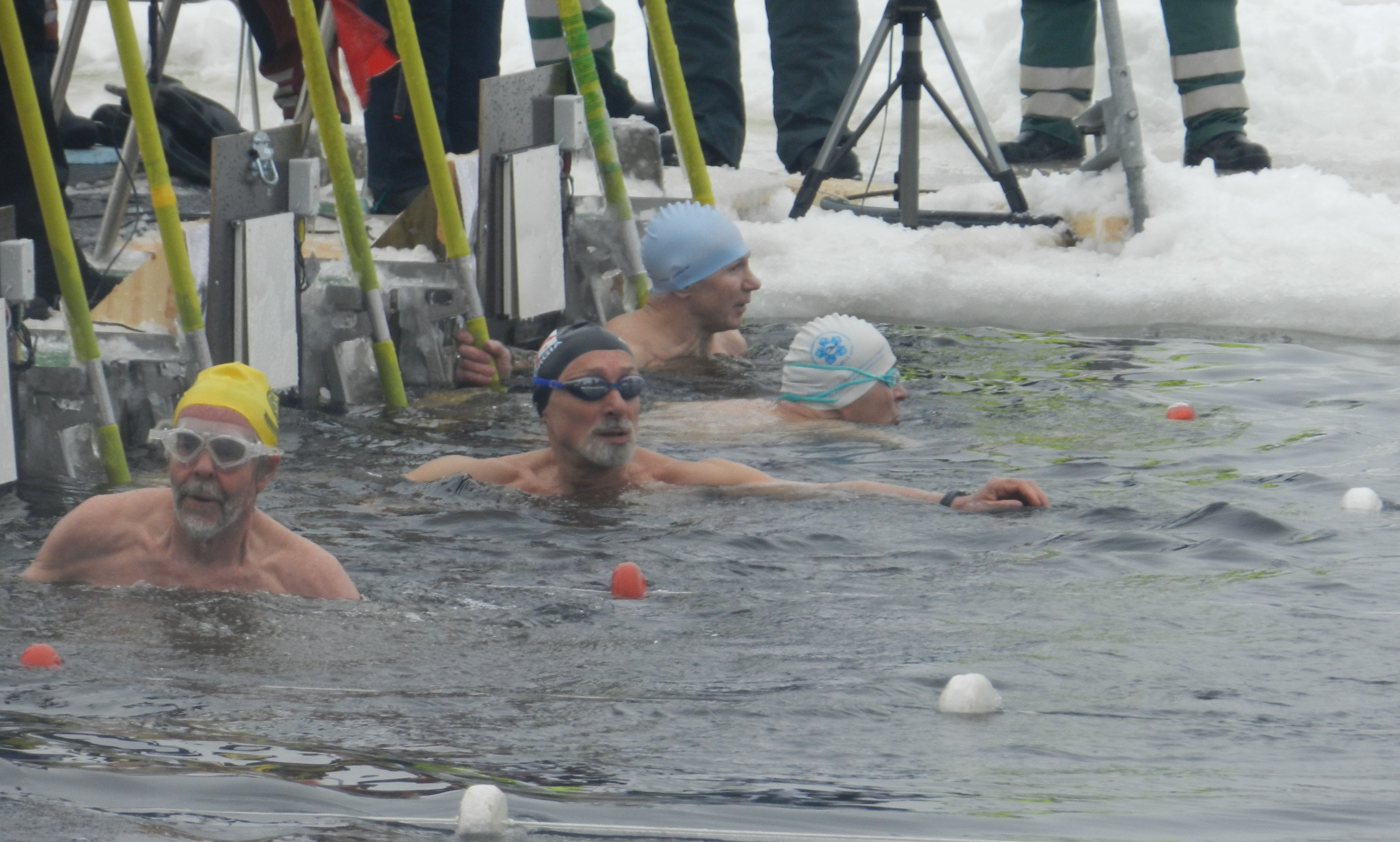
Henri Kuprashvili - 22.03.2014, Rovaniemi, Finland. The Winter Swimming World Championships

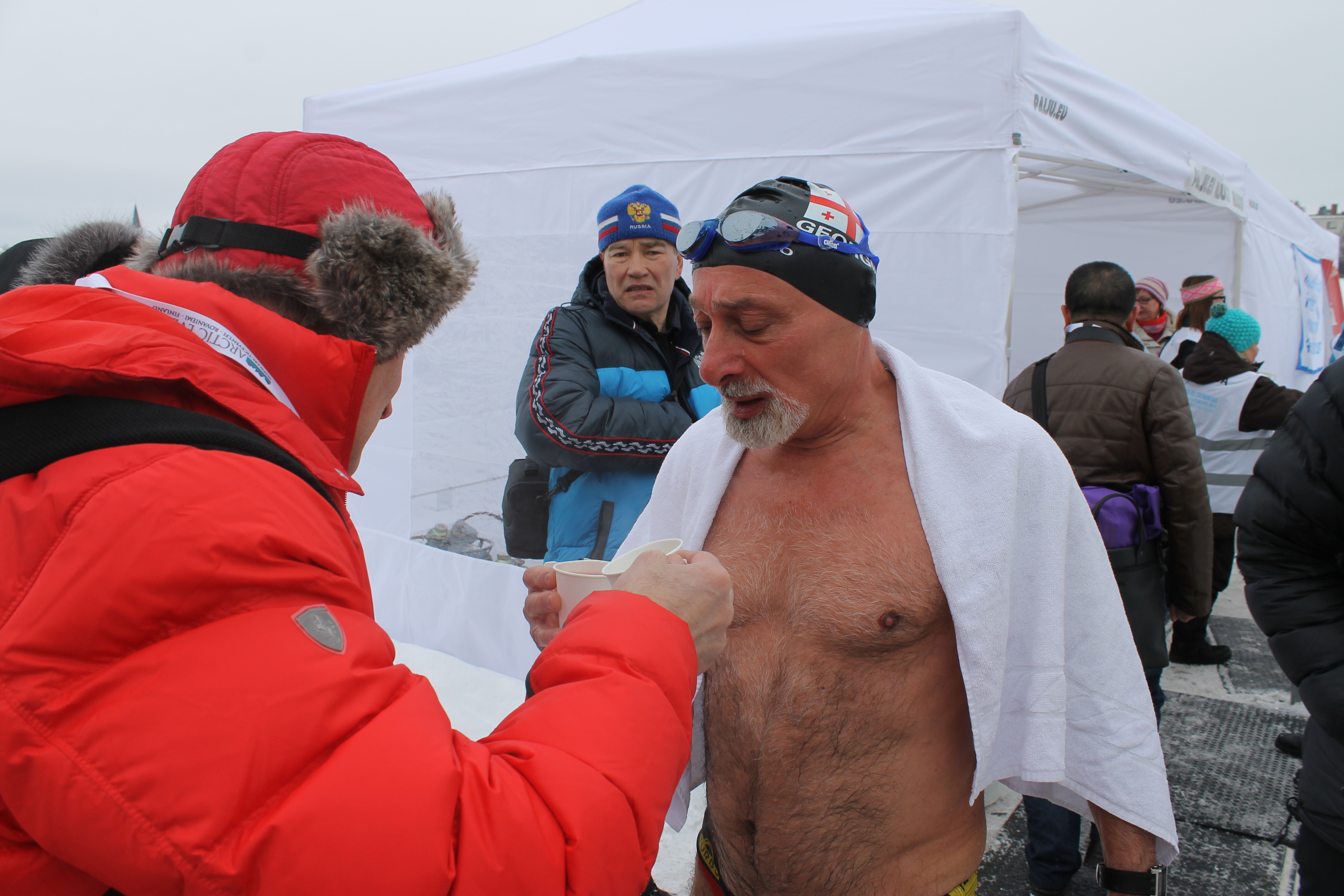
The Winter Swimming World Championships. Henri Kuprashvili - 22.03.2014, Rovaniemi, Finland

Full Professor of Georgian Technical University Henri Kuprashvili (Georgian: ჰენრი კუპრაშვილი) (born 13 September 1946 in Khashuri) is a Georgian Doctor of Political Sciences, First Class State Councillor who is most notable for breaking a Guinness record for swimming the Dardanelles, with his hands and feet bound in a traditional Georgian style of swimming, also known as Colchian. Kuprashvili has been awarded the Order of Vakhtang Gorgasali and George Byron Golden Medal.

== Swimming ==
He was the first man to swim the Dardanelles, from Europe to Asia, with his hands and feet bound in four places following the Georgian military-training swimming style known as "Hands and feet bound Colchian". He completed this swim in three and a quarter hours, on August 30, 2002. Leading up to the event, Kuprashvili went through a vigorous training schedule, including a 2 kilometre swim at "Laguna Vere". On January 28, 2001, Kuprashvili completed this swim in 92 minutes, using the same military-training swimming style. Kuprashvili is planning to swim across the Bosporus, the Strait of Gibraltar, and the English Channel, using the same style of swimming.

Henry Kuprashvili took part in Cross-Continental Swimming across the Bosphorus Strait from Asia to Europe in 01:03:14 (distance 6500 m.) organized by National Olympic Committee of Turkey on July 7, 2013 (took 16th place among 50 swimmers). More than 1500 swimmers from 37 different countries of the World took part in the Marathon. Henry Kuprashvili's main competitors were American, Netherlander, Italian, Russian, Brazilian, Japanese and Turkish professional marathon swimmers born during the period 1944 – 1953. Henri Kuprashvili World Champion in Winter Swimming - 2023 (Bled, Slovenia Henri Kuprashvili World Champion in Biathle (Individual) - 2018 (Hurghada, Egypt) World Champion in Biathle (Team) - 2015 (Batumi, Georgia) World Champion in Triathle (Team) - 2015 (Batumi, Georgia) Bronze prize winner in Triathle in the World Championship (Individual) - 2018 (Hourgagda, Egypt) Bronze winner of World Winter (Ice) Swimming Championship in 2018 (Tallinn Estonia) The participant of "Tbilisi Marathon" (21.0975 km - 23.10.2016, Tbilisi; The participant of Kazbegi Marathon (21.0975 km -04.09.2016, Kazbegi; The participant of "Tbilisi Marathon" (21.0975 km - 25.10.2014.

Also, Henry Kuprashvili showed himself as a coach:

His student, 11-year-old Jimmy Brodzeli, using “Mkhedruli Kolkhuri” (Military-training style of swimming) swam across “Tbilisi Sea” (distance 3600 m) on 3 August 2008.

Also, his student, Para swimmer Nika Tvauri took the third place and won Bronze Medal in swimming 50 meters distance using breaststroke among SB-11 category swimmers on 4th IBSA World Championship and Games in Alania, Turkey (1-10.04.2011). This medal was the first in the history of independent Georgian swimming sport.

Henry Kuprashvili's another student, 17-year-old Ana Lominadze, using old Georgian Military-training style “Mkherdruli Kolkhuri” (Military Colchian), swam across the Dardanelle's Strait on 30 August 2012. She swam 5 500 meters in 50 minutes. She was the first woman on earth that swam across the Dardanelle's Strait from Asia to Europe using Georgian Military-training swimming style. The competition was dedicated to this the tenth anniversary after Henry Kuprashvili swimming across the Dardanelles Strait.

Henry Kuprashvili is credited with reviving the Georgian style of swimming, which consists of several styles (“Lazuri” (Free Colchian), “Mkherdruli Kolkhuri” (Military Colchian)- “Hands and feet bound Kolkhuri”, “Apkhazuri” (Abkhazian), “Okribula”, “Iberiuli” (Iberian), “Takhvia” and partly “Khashuruli” and “Kizikuri”.), including the "Hands and feet bound Kolkhuri" as practised by Kuprashvili. He has initiated the study and development of a unique, Georgian method of swimming, and has written the first textbook about the methods of studying and training in Georgian national styles of swimming.

A swimming competition for young swimmers, trained in “Mkherdruli Kolkhuri” (Military Colchian) by Kuprashvili, was held on September 3, 2006 at Tbilisi. The first place at this competition was taken by 12-year-old swimmer Irakli Shengelia, who swam 3,500 meters in 40 minutes and 47 seconds. 13-year-old Nastia Grivach took second place (46.11.00), and third place was jointly taken by 11-year-old Nino Basilaia and 12-year-old Ani Sichinava (57.54.00). A second competition was held on August 30, 2007, with Irakli Shengelia again coming first. The competition was dedicated to this fifth anniversary after Henry Kuprashvili's swimming across the Dardanelles Strait.

Eduard Shevardnadze, President of Georgia from 1995 to 2003, wrote to congratulate Kuprashvili on his achievement at the Dardanelles. He was named "Person of the Year 2002" by the journal Akhali epoka.

== Biography ==
Kuprashvili is also a historian, journalist, and Full Professor of Political Science at the Georgian Technical University. He is the President of Georgian Federation of National Swimming Styles, the founder and the chairman of Saint David the builder's Union of Chokhawearers, and the Seaside Guardians Association of Aeetes He has been awarded a medal for "Courage" (1993), the Order of Vakhtang Gorgasali Second Class (2002), and the golden medal of George Byron. In 2003, by the Order of the President of Georgia (1299) he was given the rank of First Class State Advisor. Kuprashvili has defended his candidate's thesis on the topic "The geopolitical status of Georgia and priorities in Foreign policy" (1999) and Doctoral thesis on topic “Informational Politics in the process of political modernization” (2003). He has attended the high management courses for increasing qualification level in Cairo, Egypt (1995), and in addition, he took part in senior courses at the George C. Marshall European Center for Security Studies in Germany (2000).

At the National Security Council of Georgia, he created the system of strategic analysis and global modeling “Didgori”, the program “Aisi” for analysis and prognosis of political events with the help of the Politimetric method.

He is the author and Manager Project of Multi and Interdisciplinary Training and Scientific Theoretical-Practical activities Politics on trial, which is carried out by the faculty of law and international relations of Georgian Technical University.

Between 1968 and 2006 Kuprashvili worked at the Georgian Technical University, initially as an assistant, and later as associate professor, and Deputy Chairman of the trade union committee. He is now Professor of the sub-faculty of Politology and International relations at the Georgian Technical University. Between 1977 and 1979, he worked at the Tbilisi City Committee of People's Control, as chairperson of the methodology seminar. From 1989 to 1992 he worked for the Popular Front of Georgia, as head of the department and assistant to the Chairman. During 1992 he was Responsible Secretary of the Special Governmental Commission on Tskhinvali Region Problems, at the Cabinet of Georgia. Between 1992 and 1996, he was Head of the Service of Control of the tasks assigned by the President and relations with State management bodies, Chief State Advisor. From 1996 to 2004 he worked at the Office of the National Security Council of Georgia as Head Of the Information–Analytical Service; the Director of Department of Monitoring, Analysis Security and Information; Chief of the Information Analysis Department. Since 2005 he has been Chief of Coordination Division of Governmental Special Communications and Information Agency of Georgia. Between 1996 and 2002 he was the representative of Georgia to the Commonwealth of Independent States (CIS) member countries’ information coordination council.

In 1967, while serving in the Soviet Army, and then while working in Polytechnical Institute of Georgia (1975), Kuprashvili was given a notice for thinking differently, dissident inclinations, and spreading illegal literature, by the USSR Committee for State Security (the KGB).

== Family ==
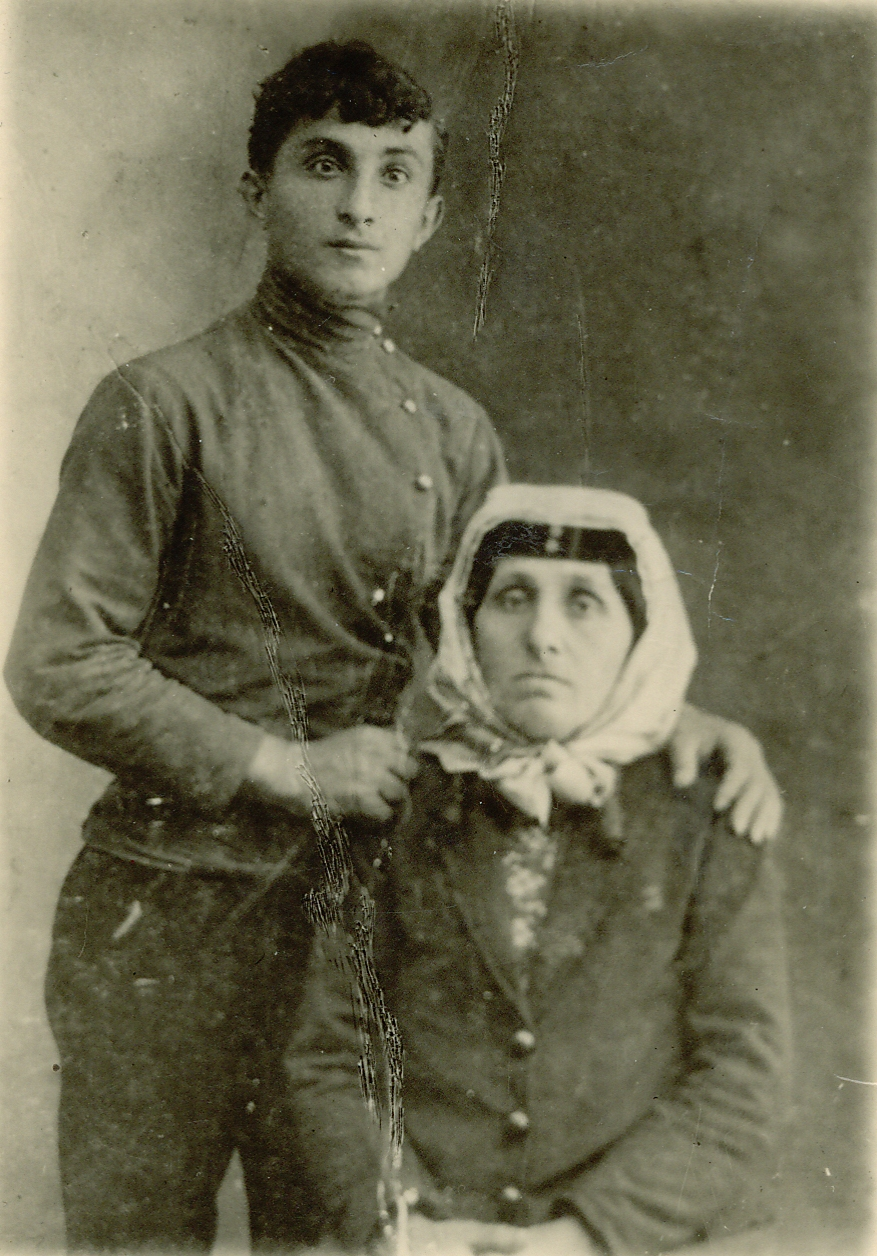
Luka Kuprashvili and his mother Mariam Kipiani. 1912 year

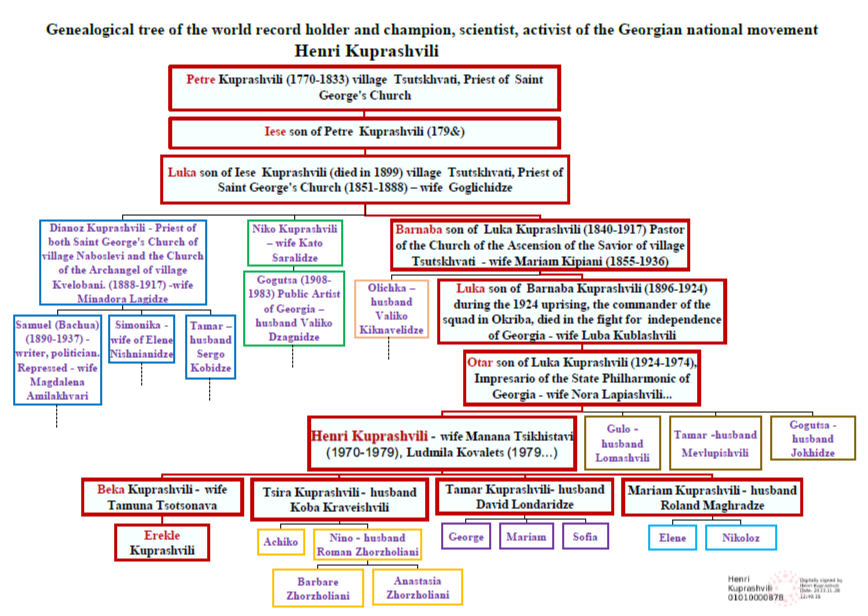
Henri Kuprashvili -Genealogical tree

Kuprashvili is the son of Otar Kuprashvili (1924–1974), commissioner of the State Philarmony, and Nora Lapiashvili (born 1925). His grandfather, Luka Kuprashvili (1896–1924), born in Tsutskhvati, Tkibuli region, perished during the Georgian military rebellion against Bolshevik Russia. Henri Kuprashvili is married to Ludmila Kovalets-Kuprashvili, and the couple have four children.
