= Lazuri =

Lazuri may refer to:

== Places ==
- Lazuri, Satu Mare, a commune in Satu Mare County, Romania
- Lazuri, a village in Lupșa Commune, Alba County, Romania
- Lazuri, a village in Sohodol Commune, Alba County, Romania
- Lazuri, a village in Vârfurile Commune, Arad County, Romania
- Lazuri, a village in Roșia, Bihor Commune, Bihor County, Romania
- Lazuri, a village in Comișani Commune, Dâmboviţa County, Romania
- Lazuri, a village in Scoarța Commune, Gorj County, Romania
- Lazuri, a village in Valcău de Jos Commune, Sălaj County, Romania
- Lazuri de Beiuș, a commune in Bihor County, Romania

== Other uses ==
- Laz people
- Laz language
- Lazuri (swimming)
