= Georgian swimming =

Swimming styles

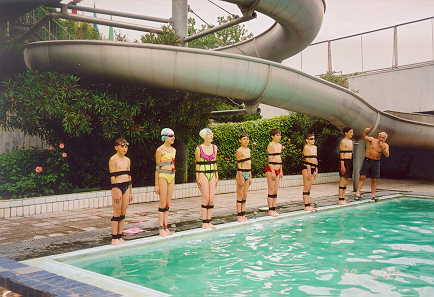
A group of swimmers with arms and legs bound in preparation for Georgian-style swimming.

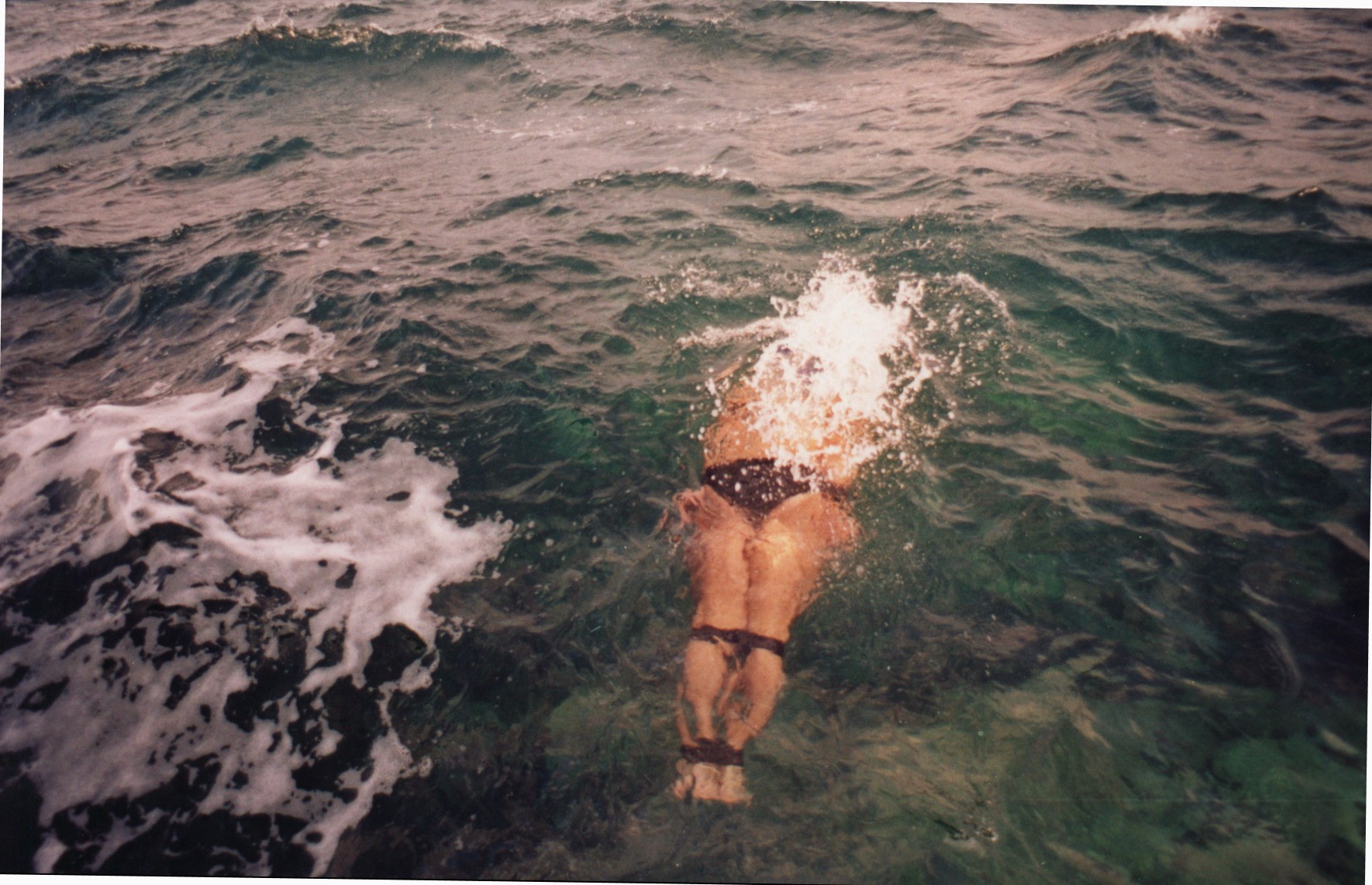
Henry Kuprashvili swims Georgian style.

Georgian swimming comprises several styles unique to Georgia: “Lazuri” (Free Colchian), “Hands and feet bound Kolkhuri” (Military Colchian), “Apkhazuri” (Abkhazian), “Okribula”, “Iberiuli” (Iberian), “Takhvia” and partly “Khashuruli” and “Kizikuri”. More traditional movements of the extremities are restricted or barred and forward motion is accomplished by dolphin-like undulation of hips and paired feet. These styles emulate the motions of mammals such as the seal, dolphin, sea lion, whale, otter, and beaver, which have evolved adaptations to water that enable them to attain an optimal swimming ability.

The Georgian style of swimming (Colchian and Iberian style) was revived by the swimmer Henry Kuprashvili. He laid foundation of Georgian styles of swimming study process and established the school of swimming.

== History ==
In the beginning of the 1960s, Levan Kursua (1887–1969), a resident of the seaside village of Ergeta (Anaklia) in Mingrelia (Colchis), retold a Georgian legend about Colchian (Lazica) and Iberian warriors who, as part of their training, used a style of swimming where their hands and feet were bound firmly. His narrative proposed that while, initially daunting, this style of swimming could also be used as a regimen to develop discipline and physical stamina in martial culture:

- psychological preparation of the warrior - a person with hands and feet bound firmly to the body, forcefully exposed to water is made to confront fear of drowning or water in a way intended to develop resources that enable them to overcome psychological barriers encountered in various other extreme conditions.
- chances for escape by water for a warrior taken captive (as from a ship or a bridge) were better even if they were bound

The revival of these unique Georgian style of swimming started at the “Lagune Vere” sports complex in Tbilisi.

- One of the Georgian style of swimming, military-training style “Hands and feet bound Kolkhuri” (Military Colchian), was revived when on January 28, 2001, many journalists and other spectators witnessed an unusual feat that served to acquaint Georgian swimming to the world. A man, with straightened legs together and arms at the side, bound at the chest, hips, thighs and ankles, jumped into the water. Henry Kuprashvili was the first man to uninterruptedly swim 2 kilometers in the Kolkhuri style. Georgian records were set for TV reporting purchases by Reuters and the Associated Press. American TV channel CNN called the swimmer the “human dolphin” and broadcast his interview several times.
- In 2002, for the first time in history, a successful swim was completed across the 12 km Dardanelles strait in 3 hours and 15 minutes by a bound Henry Kuprashvili. The endeavour took place under the direction and support of “Laguna Vere” and the sport society “Dinamo” (K.Narchemashvili).
- In 2003, under the auspices of “Laguna Vere”, 12 students of Demireli College temporarily convened the first Georgian swimming styles experimental study group.
- On June 7, 2004, the first ever competition in the “Free Kolkhuri” and “Hands and feet bound Kolkhuri” (Military Colchian) styles was held at “Laguna Vere”. On May 12, 2006, 60 swimmers took part in the competition (including 10 from the city of Rustavi).
- On September 3, 2006, "Laguna Vere" students Nino Basilaia, Ani Sichinava (age 11), Irakli Shengelia (age 12) and Nastia Grivach (age 13) became the first to swim "Hands and feet bound Kolkhuri" (Military Colchian) across the "Tbilisi Sea". A swim across the Dardanelles Strait is awaiting sponsorship. The second Tbilisi Sea group "Hands and feet bound Kolkhuri" (Military Colchian) swim was held on August 30, 2007. First place was taken by 13-year-old Irakli Shengelia, whose time of 37 minutes and 53 seconds bested 2006's results of 40:47:00.
- A competition in “Rachuli” swimming for people over age 70 was held at “Laguna Vere” on June 23, 2007. It was supported by the international association “930” (M.Malazonia) and met with high public interest. The prizewinners were: Shalva Kvintradze (age 78), Kakhi Kavsadze (age 73), and Givi Gadelia (age 72).
- The American Stephany Hillborn, a journalist from the newspaper Georgia Today, is the first foreigner who has studied “Free Kolkhuri”. The competition among journalists was held at “Laguna Vere” on July 21, 2007. Hillborn swam “Free Kolkhuri” and won first place. She finished ahead of Rustavi 2 journalist Khatuna Nozadze by 1 second.
- Georgian swimmer Anna Lominadze became the first woman to swim across the Dardanelles strait in the “Hands and feet bound Kolkhuri” (Military Colchian) style on August 30, 2012, swimming 5,500 meters in 50 minutes.

Dimitri Dick, originally from Germany, is the first Georgian coach who was actively inculcated in the styles of Georgian swimming as part of the professional sportsmen training program at “Laguna Vere”. Georgian swimming styles are overseen there by chief coach Manana Zambakhidze.
