= Competitive swimming =

Water-based sport

Swimming
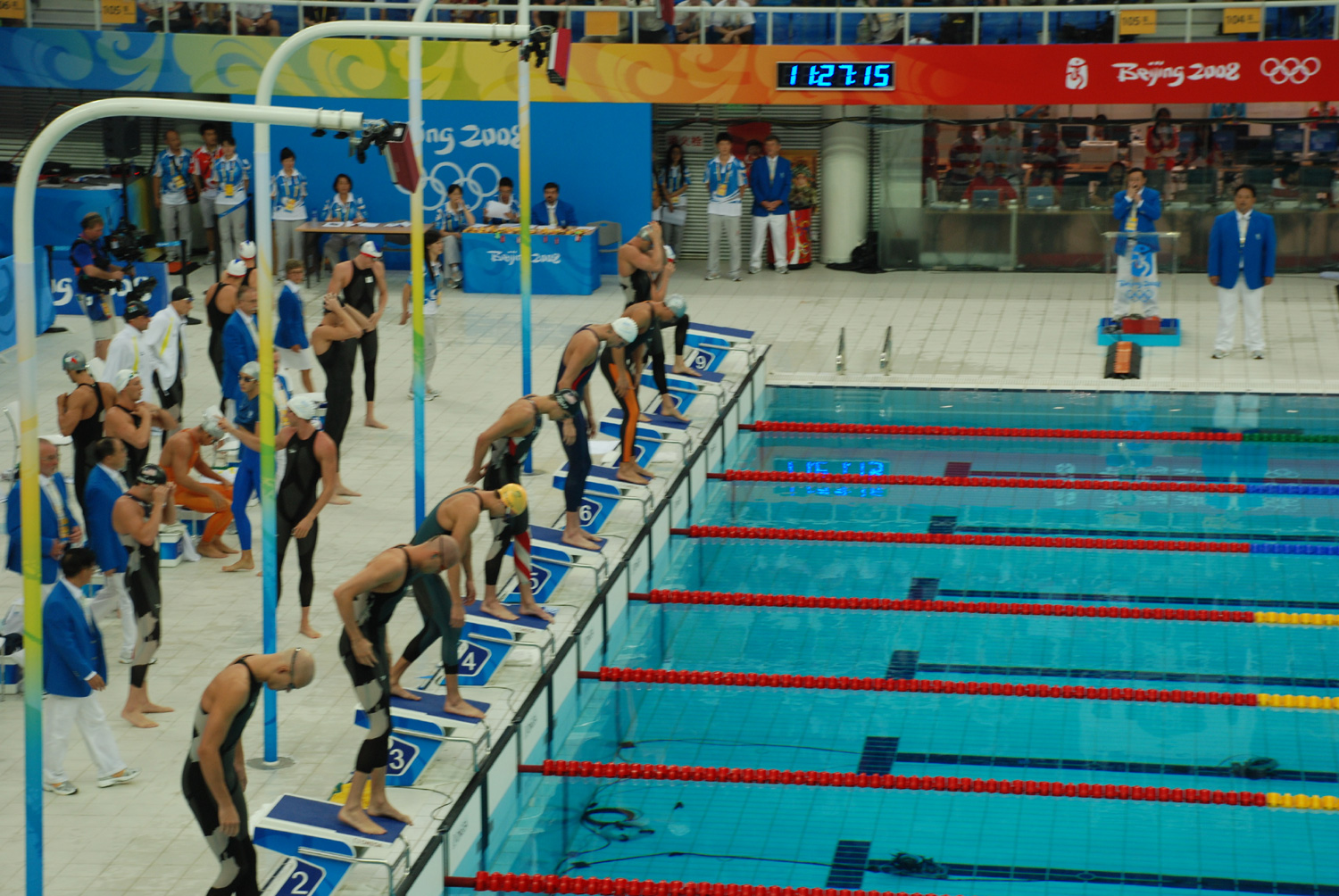
- Start of the 4 × 100 meters men's relay during the 2008 Summer Olympics in Beijing
- Highest governing body: World Aquatics
- First competition: 1846

Characteristics
- Contact: No
- Team members: Team or individuals
- Mixed-sex: Yes
- Venue: Natatorium; open-water

Presence
- Country or region: Worldwide
- Olympic: 1896
- World Championships: 1973
- Paralympic: 1960

Swimming is an individual or team racing sport that requires the use of one's entire body to move through water. The sport takes place in pools or open water (e.g., in a sea or lake). Competitive swimming is one of the most popular Olympic sports, with varied distance events in butterfly, backstroke, breaststroke, freestyle, and individual medley. In addition to these individual events, four swimmers can take part in either a freestyle or medley relay. A medley relay consists of four swimmers who will each swim a different stroke, ordered as backstroke, breaststroke, butterfly and freestyle.

Swimming each stroke requires a set of specific techniques; in competition, there are distinct regulations concerning the acceptable form for each individual stroke. There are also regulations on what types of swimsuits, caps, jewelry and injury tape that are allowed at competitions. There are many health benefits to swimming, but it is possible for competitive swimmers to incur injuries such as tendinopathy in the shoulders or knees.

== History ==
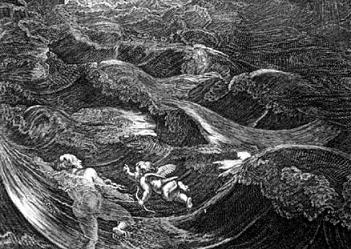
Leander swimming across the Hellespont. Detail from a painting by Bernard Picart.

Evidence of recreational swimming in prehistoric times has been found, with the earliest evidence dating to Stone Age paintings from around 10,000 years ago. Written references date from 2000 BC, with some of the earliest references to swimming including the Iliad, the Odyssey, the Bible, Beowulf, the Quran and others. In 1538, Nikolaus Wynmann, a Swiss–German professor of languages, wrote the earliest known complete book about swimming, Colymbetes, sive de arte natandi dialogus et festivus et iucundus lectu (The Swimmer, or A Dialogue on the Art of Swimming and Joyful and Pleasant to Read).

Swimming emerged as a competitive recreational activity in the 1830s in England. In 1828, the first indoor swimming pool, St George's Baths was opened to the public. By 1837, the National Swimming Society was holding regular swimming competitions in six artificial swimming pools, built around London. The recreational activity grew in popularity and by 1880, when the first national governing body, the Amateur Swimming Association was formed, there were already over 300 regional clubs in operation across the country.

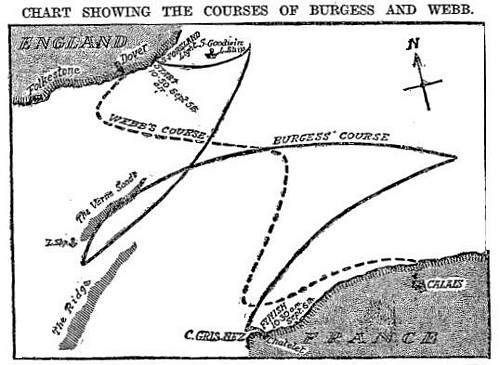
The routes taken by Webb and T.W. Burgess across the English Channel, in 1875 and 1911, respectively.

In 1844 two Native American participants at a swimming competition in London introduced the front crawl to a European audience. Sir John Arthur Trudgen picked up the hand-over stroke from some South American natives and successfully debuted the new stroke in 1873, winning a local competition in England. His stroke is still regarded as the most powerful to use today.

Captain Matthew Webb was the first man to swim the English Channel (between England and France), in 1875. Using the breaststroke technique, he swam the channel 21.26 miles (34.21 km) in 21 hours and 45 minutes. His feat was not replicated or surpassed for the next 36 years, until T.W. Burgess made the crossing in 1911.

Other European countries also established swimming federations; Germany in 1882, France in 1890 and Hungary in 1896. The first European amateur swimming competitions were in 1889 in Vienna. The world's first women's swimming championship was held in Scotland in 1892. Men's swimming became part of the first modern Olympic Games in 1896 in Athens. In 1902, the Australian Richmond Cavill introduced freestyle to the Western world. In 1908, the world swimming association, Fédération Internationale de Natation (FINA, now World Aquatics), was formed. Women's swimming was introduced into the Olympics in 1912; the first international swim meet for women outside the Olympics was the 1922 Women's Olympiad. Butterfly was developed in the 1930s and was at first a variant of breaststroke, until it was accepted as a separate style in 1952. FINA renamed itself World Aquatics in December 2022.

== Competitive swimming ==
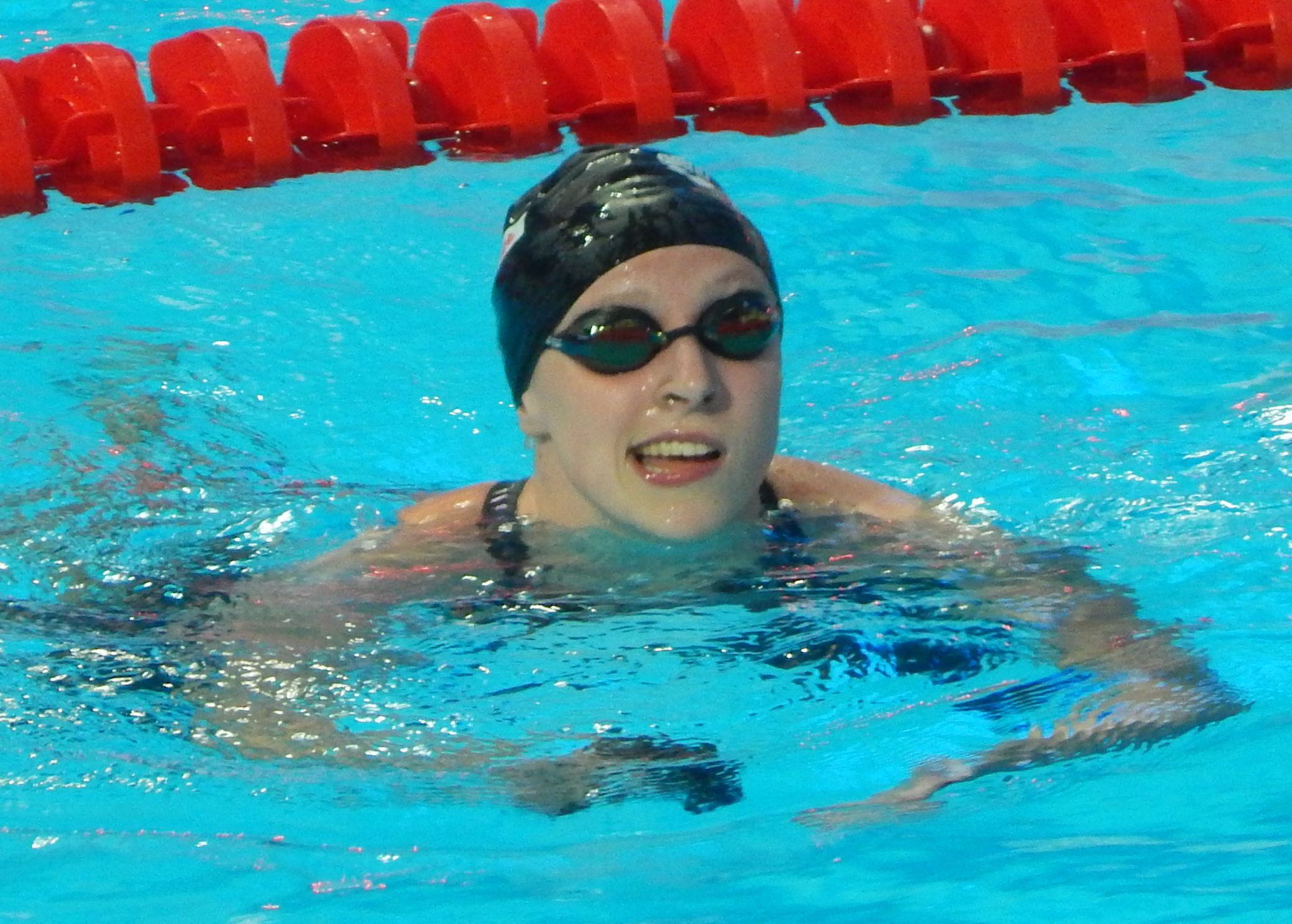
Katie Ledecky set the Olympic records in 2016 for the 400m and 800m freestyle.

Competitive swimming became popular in the 19th century. The goal of high level competitive swimming is to break personal or world records while beating competitors in any given event. Swimming in competition should create the least resistance in order to obtain maximum speed. However, some professional swimmers who do not hold a national or world ranking are considered the best in regard to their technical skills. Typically, an athlete goes through a cycle of training in which the body is overloaded with work in the beginning and middle segments of the cycle, and then the workload is decreased in the final stage as the swimmer approaches competition.

The practice of reducing exercise in the days just before an important competition is called tapering. Tapering is used to give the swimmer's body some rest without stopping exercise completely. A final stage is often referred to as "shave and taper": the swimmer shaves off all exposed hair for the sake of reducing drag and having a sleeker and more hydrodynamic feel in the water. Additionally, the "shave and taper" method refers to the removal of the top layer of "dead skin", which exposes the newer and richer skin underneath. This also helps to "shave" off mere milliseconds on your time.

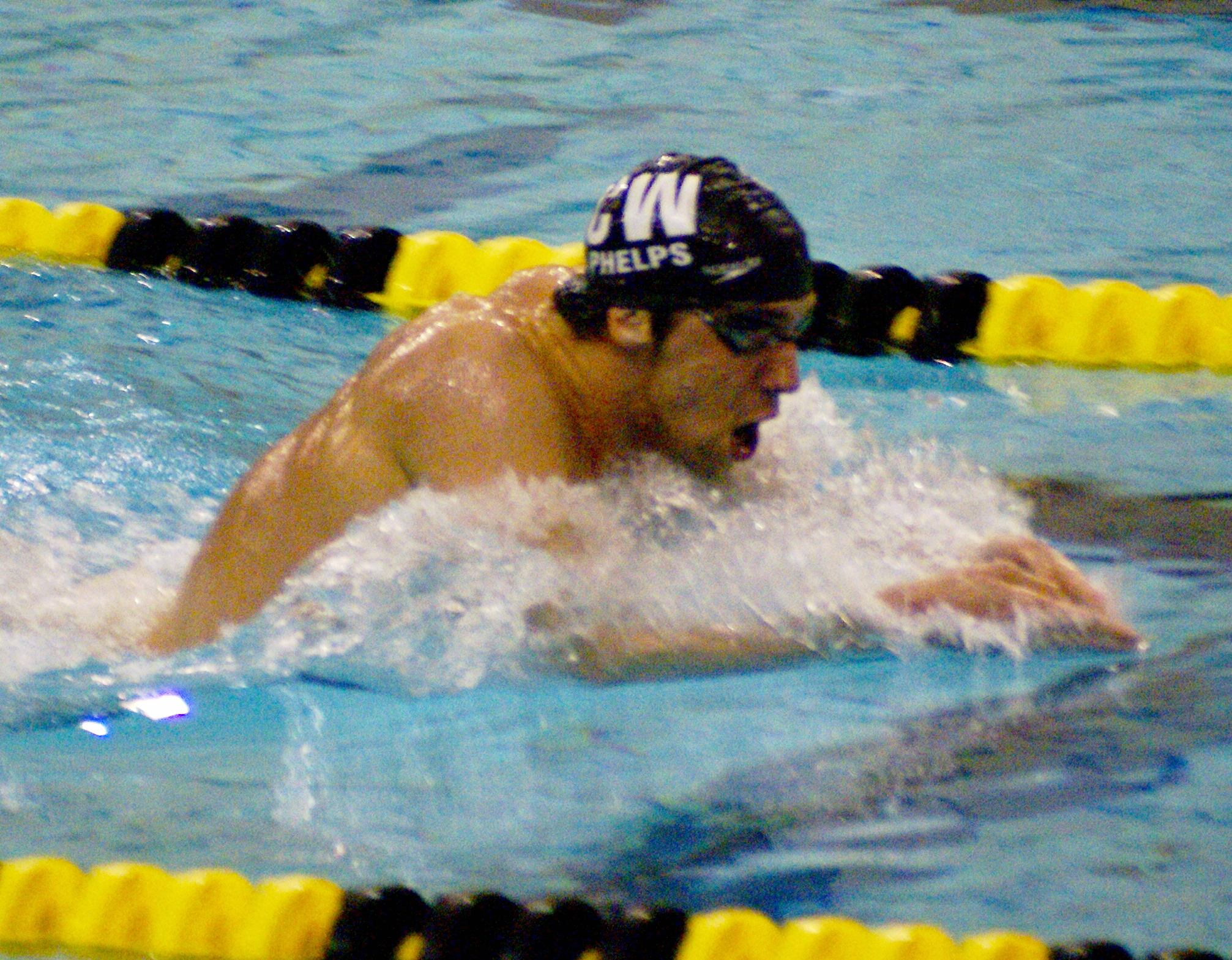
Olympic gold medalist Michael Phelps in the 400 IM.

Swimming is an event at the Summer Olympic Games, where male and female athletes compete in 17 of the recognized events each. The International Olympic Committee (IOC) announced in 2025 that it would be adding the 50m butterfly, backstroke, and breaststroke events, bringing the total of events from 35 to 41 total events. Olympic events are held in a 50-meter pool, called a long course pool.

The World Aquatics (Fédération internationale de natation or FINA) recognizes forty official events individual swimming events in the pool; however the International Olympic Committee only recognizes 32 of them. The international governing body for competitive swimming is World Aquatics, which was known until 2023 as the Fédération Internationale de Natation ("International Swimming Federation"), or FINA.

=== Open water ===
In open water swimming, where the events are swum in a body of open water (lake or sea), there are also 5 km, 10 km and 25 km events for men and women. However, only the 10 km event is included in the Olympic schedule, again for both men and women. Pool and open-water competitions are typically separate events, except at the World Championships and the Olympics.

=== Swim styles ===
In competitive swimming, four major styles have been established. These have been relatively stable over the last 30 to 40 years with minor improvements. They are:

- Butterfly
- Backstroke
- Breaststroke
- Freestyle

In competition, only one of these styles may be used except in the case of the individual medley, or IM, which consists of all four. In this latter event, swimmers swim equal distances of butterfly, then backstroke, breaststroke, and finally, freestyle. In Olympic competition, this event is swum in two distances: 200 and 400 meters. Some short course competitions also include the 100-yard or 100-meter IM – particularly, for younger or newer swimmers (typically under 14 years) involved in club swimming, or masters swimming (over 18).

=== Dolphin kick ===
Since the 1990s, the most drastic change in swimming has been the addition of the underwater dolphin kick. This is used to maximize the speed at the start and after the turns in all styles. David Berkoff became the first to use it successfully; at the 1988 Olympics, he swam most of the 100 m backstroke race underwater and broke the world record in the distance during the preliminaries. Another swimmer to use the technique was Denis Pankratov at the 1996 Olympics in Atlanta, where he completed almost half of the 100 m butterfly underwater to win the gold medal.

The dolphin kick was rarely used in freestyle sprint races until 2008, when "technical" swimsuits were introduced to the sport at the European Short Course Championships in Rijeka, Croatia. Technical-suited Amaury Leveaux set world records of 44.94 seconds in the 100 m freestyle, 20.48 seconds in the 50 m freestyle and 22.18 in the 50 m butterfly, spending more than half of each race submerged, more than any of his competitors.

Subsequently, FINA made a rule that swimmers may not go farther than 15 metres underwater. In 2014, FINA rules that a single dolphin kick may be added to the breaststroke pullout before the first breaststroke kick.

In the past decade, American competitive swimmers have made the most use of the underwater dolphin kick, notably Olympic and World medal winners Michael Phelps and Ryan Lochte.

== Competition pools ==
A simplified diagram of the World Aquatics long course swimming pool standard, used at the World Championships and Summer Olympics

Short and long course pools both in international and US dimensions

World Championship pools must be 50 metres (160 ft) (long course) long and 25 metres (82 ft) wide, with ten lanes labelled zero to nine (or one to ten in some pools; zero and nine (or one and ten) are usually left empty in semi-finals and finals); the lanes must be at least 2.5 metres (8.2 ft) wide. They will be equipped with starting blocks at both ends of the pool and most will have Automatic Officiating Equipment, including touch pads to record times and sensors to ensure the legality of relay takeovers. The pool must have a minimum depth of two metres.

Other pools which host events under World Aquatics regulations are required to meet some but not all of these requirements. Many of these pools have eight, or even six, instead of ten lanes and some will be 25 metres (82 ft) long, making them Short course. World records that are set in short course pools are kept separate from those set in long course pools because it may be an advantage or disadvantage to swimmers to have more or less turns in a race.

Due to waves created by the swimmers, it can be an advantage to swim closer to the center of the pool during a race. Due to this, World Aquatics regulations specify which lane each swimmer competes in based on previous times.

In a ten lane pool this is as follows:

Lane Seeding
Lane	Time
1	7
2	5
3	3
4	1
5	2
6	4
7	6
8	8

== Seasons ==
Competitive swimming, from the club through to international level, tends to have an autumn and winter season competing in short course (25 metres or yards) pools and a spring and summer season competing in long course (50-metre) pools and in open water.

In international competition and in club swimming in Europe, the short course (25m) season lasts from September to December, and the long course (50m) season from January to August with open water in the summer months. These regulations are slowly being brought to competition in North America.

As of right now, in club, school, and college swimming in the United States and Canada, the short course (25 yards) season is much longer, from September to March. The long-course season takes place in 50-meter pools and lasts from April to the end of August with open water in the summer months.

In club swimming in Australasia, the short course (25m) season lasts from April to September, and the long course (50m) season from October to March with open water in the summer months.

Outside the United States, meters is the standard in both short and long course swimming, with the same distances swum in all events. In the American short course season, the 500-yard, 1000 yard, and 1650-yard freestyle events are swum as a yard is much shorter than a meter (100 yards equals 91.44 meters), while during the American long course season the 400 meter, 800 meter, and 1500-meter freestyle events are swum instead.

Beginning each swimming season racing in short course allows for shorter distance races for novice swimmers. For example, in the short course season if a swimmer wanted to compete in a stroke they had just learned, a 25-yard/meter race is available to them, opposed to the long course season when they would need to be able to swim at least 50 meters of that new stroke in order to compete.

== Officials ==
Several types of officials are required for official competition.

Referee: The referee has full control and authority over all officials. The referee will enforce all rules and decisions of World Aquatics and shall have the final answer to all questions relating to the actual conduct of anything regarding the meet, as well as the final settlement of which is not otherwise covered by the rules. The referee takes overall responsibility for running the meet and makes the final decisions as to who wins each race. Referees call swimmers to the blocks with short blasts of their whistles. This is the signal for the swimmers to stand next to their blocks. Then the referee will blow a long whistle that will tell the swimmers to step on the block. For backstroke events, the long whistle is the signal for the swimmers to jump into the water. The referee will then blow another long whistle, signalling the swimmers to grab the gutter or the provided block handle. Finally the referee will hand over the rest to the starter by directing their hand to the starter.

Starter: The starter has full control of the swimmers from the time the referee turns the swimmers over to them until the race commences. A starter begins the race by saying, "Take your mark." At this point, the swimmers will get into stationary positions, sometimes known as "point zero", in which they would like to start their race. After all swimmers have assumed their stationary position, the starter will push a button on the starting system, signaling the start of a race with a loud noise (usually a beep or a horn) and flash from a strobe light. A starter sends the swimmers off the blocks and may call a false start if a swimmer leaves the block before the starter sends them. A starter may also choose to recall the race after the start for any reason or request the swimmers to "stand", "relax" or "step down" if they believe that (a) particular swimmer(s) has obtained an unfair advantage at the start.

Clerk of course: The clerk of course (also called the "bullpen") assembles swimmers before each event, and organizes ("seeds") swimmers into heats based on their times. Heats are generally seeded from slowest to fastest, where swimmers with no previous time for an event are assumed to be the slowest. The clerk of the course is also responsible for recording and reporting swimmers who have chosen to "scratch" (not swim) their events after they have signed up or qualified to a semifinal or final. The clerk is also responsible for enforcing rules of the swim meet if a swimmer chooses to not show up ("No show" - NS, or "Did Not Swim" - DNS) to their events.

Timekeepers: Each timekeeper takes the time of the swimmers in the lane assigned to them. Unless a video backup system is used, it may be necessary to use the full complement of timekeepers even when automatic officiating equipment is used. A chief timekeeper assigns the seating positions for all timekeepers and the lanes for which they are responsible. In most competitions there will be one or more timekeepers per lane. In international competitions where full automatic timing and video placing equipment is in use timekeepers may not be required.

Inspectors of turns: One inspector of turns is assigned to one or more lanes at each end of the pool. Each inspector of turns ensures that swimmers comply with the relevant rules for turning, as well as the relevant rules for start and finish of the race. Inspectors of turns shall report any violation on disqualification reports detailing the event, lane number, and the infringement delivered to the chief inspector of turns who will immediately convey the report to the referee.

Judges of stroke: Judges of stroke are located on each side of the pool. They follow the swimmers during their swim back and forth across the pool. They ensure that the rules related to the style of swimming designated for the event are being observed, and observe the turns and the finishes to assist the inspectors of turns.

Finish judges: Finish judges determine the order of finish and make sure the swimmers finish in accordance with the rules (two hands simultaneously for breaststroke and butterfly, on the back for backstroke, etc.)

If an official observes a swimmer breaking a rule concerning the stroke they are swimming, the official will report what they have seen to the referee. The referee can disqualify (or DQ) any swimmer for any violation of the rules that they personally observe or for any violation reported to them by other authorized officials. All disqualifications are subject to the decision and discretion of the referee.

Those who are disqualified may choose to contest their disqualification. In age-group level swimming, however, this is rare. Appeals are reviewed by a panel of officials instead of the deck referee or stroke judges who may have made the initial disqualification decision.

== Swimwear and equipment ==
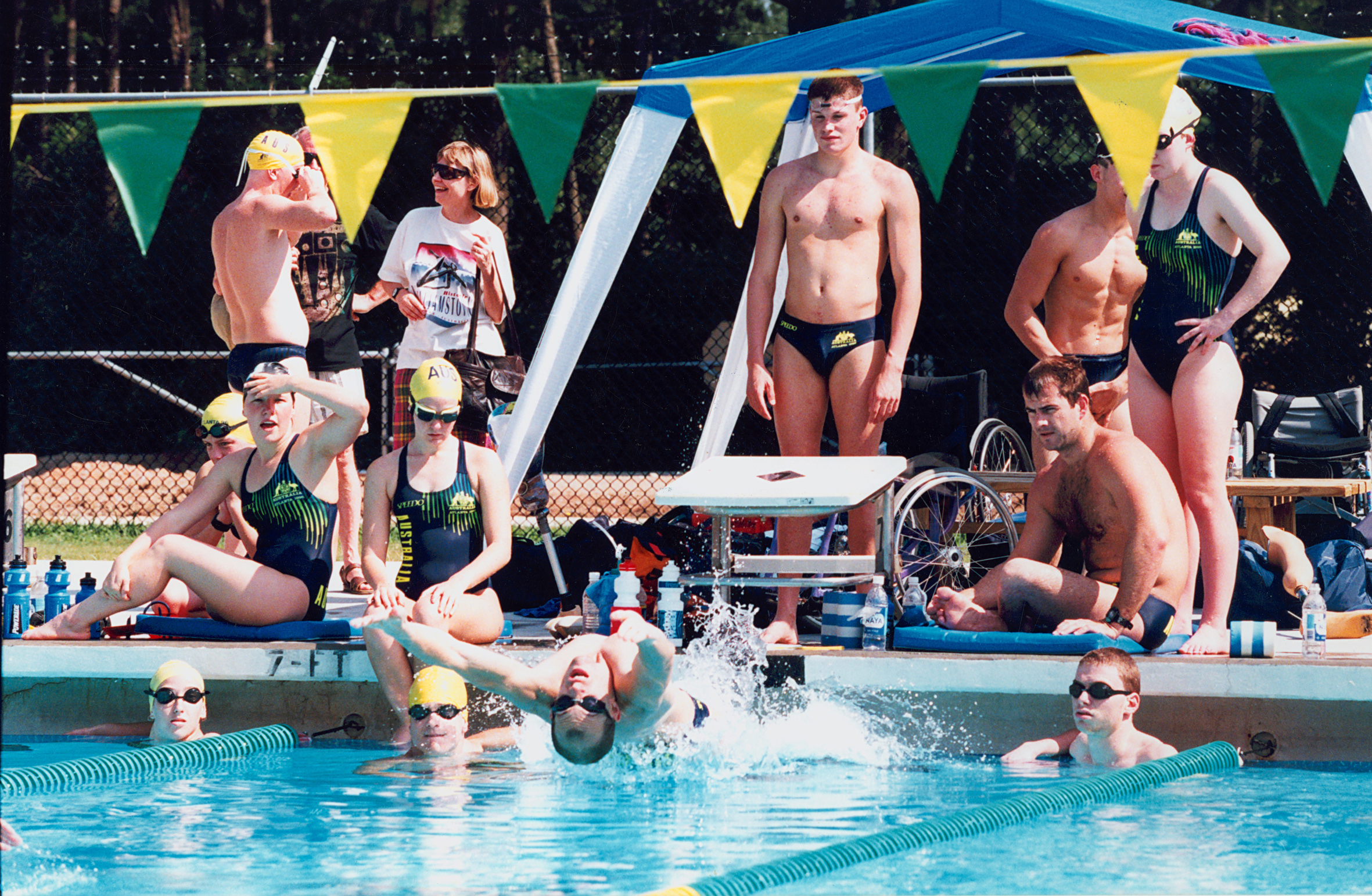
Australian Swim Team in their swimsuits, 1996

Swimsuit
Competitive swimwear seeks to improve upon bare skin for a speed advantage and coverage. In 2009, FINA rules and regulations were altered and suits made with polyurethane were banned because they made athletes more buoyant. These rules also banned suits which go above the navel or below the knee for men and suits which extend past the shoulders or cover the neck for women.
Swim cap
A swim cap (a.k.a. cap) keeps the swimmer's hair out of the way to reduce drag. Caps may be made of latex, silicone, spandex or lycra.

Goggles
Goggles keep water and chlorine out of swimmers' eyes. Goggles may be tinted to counteract glare at outdoor pools. Prescription goggles may be used by swimmers who wear corrective lenses.
Swim fins
Rubber fins are used to help kick faster and build strength and technique, but are illegal in a race. They also improve technique by keeping the feet in the proper position while kicking.
Drag suit
Swimmers use drag suits in training to increase resistance. This allows a swimmer to be challenged even more when practicing and let the swimmer feel less resistance when racing. Drag suits are not used in competitive races.
Hand paddles
Swimmers use these plastic devices to build arm and shoulder strength while refining hand-pulling technique. Hand paddles attach to the hand with rubber tubing or elastic material. They come in many different shapes and sizes, depending on swimmer preference and hand size.
Kickboard
A kickboard is a foam board that swimmers use to support the weight of the upper body while they focus on kicking. Kicking is the movement of the legs only which helps to increase leg muscle for future strength.
Pull buoy
Often used at the same time as hand paddles, pull buoys support swimmers' legs (and prevent them from kicking) while they focus on pulling. Pull buoys are made of foam so they float in the water. Swimmers hold them in between the thighs. They can also be used as a kickboard to make kicking a little harder.
Ankle bands
Improving balance will minimize the need for this kick to provide an upward, instead of a forward vector, and in some cases completely corrects the kick. Using an ankle band will have the immediate effect of turning off your kick, which then forces you to make efforts to correct your balance. If you are successful in discovering these, then the ankle band has done part of its job.
Snorkel
A snorkel is a plastic device that helps swimmers breathe while swimming. This piece of equipment helps the swimmer practice keeping their head in one position, along with training them for the proper breathing technique of breathing in through the mouth and out the nose. This technique is the opposite of a common runner's breathing pattern, which is in the nose and out the mouth.

=== Common swimwear ===
Brands such as Arena, Speedo, and TYR, are popular regular swimwear brands. The most durable material for regular swimming is Polyester. The main difference between competition and regular swimwear is that competition swimwear is tighter and compresses the muscles of the swimmers. Regular swimwear is easier to put on and more comfortable for leisure activities.

==== Men ====
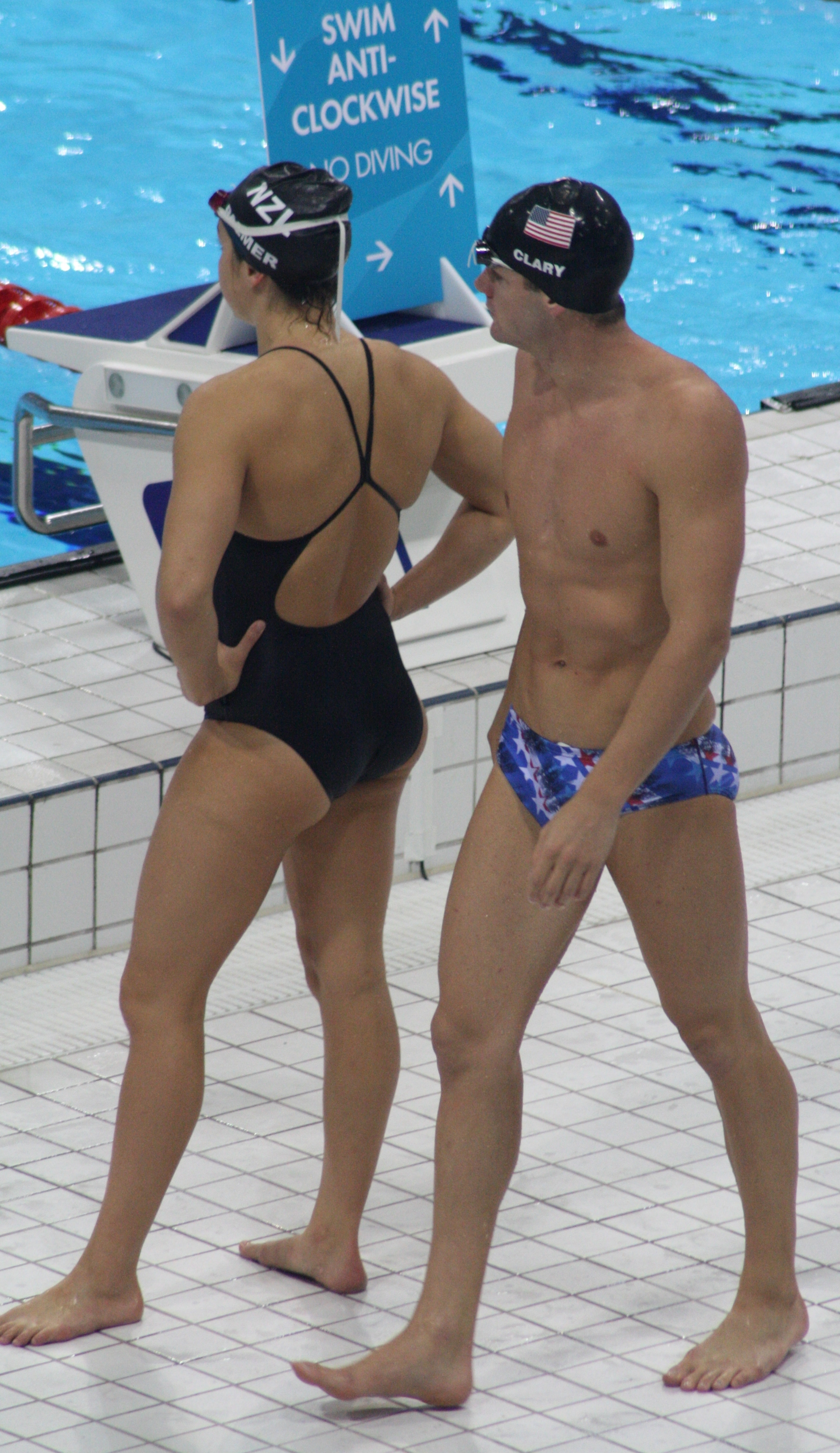
Olympic gold medalist Tyler Clary of U.S. walks wearing men's swim briefs, while Hayley Palmer sports a racerback one-piece swimsuit, 2012

The most used practice swimwear for men includes briefs and jammers. Males generally swim barechested.

There was controversy after the Beijing Olympic Games in 2008 when many Olympic swimmers broke records an unprecedented number of times using revolutionary swimsuits that covered their entire legs. To highlight the issue, in 2008, 70 world records were broken in one year, and 66 Olympic records were broken in one Olympic Games (there were races in Beijing where the first five finishers were swimming faster than the old world record).

As of 1 January 2010, men are only allowed to wear suits from the waist to the knees. They are also only permitted to wear one piece of swimwear; they cannot wear briefs underneath jammers. This rule was enacted after the controversy in the Beijing Olympics and Rome World Championships.

==== Women ====
Women wear one-piece suits with thicker and higher backs for competition, though two-piece suits can also be worn during practice. Backs vary mainly in strap thickness and geometric design. Most common styles include: racerback, axel back, corset, diamondback, and butterfly-back/fly-back. There are also different style lengths: three-quarter length (reaches the knees), regular length (shoulders to hips), and bikini style (two-piece). As of 1 January 2010, in competition, women must wear suits that do not go past the shoulders or knees.

==== Use of drag wear ====
Drag suits are used to increase water resistance against the swimmer to help them train for competitions. Other forms of drag wear include nylons, old suits, and T-shirts: articles that increase friction in the water to build strength during training, and thus increase speed once drag items are removed for competition. Some swimmers practice in basketball shorts over their bathing suit, wearing two bathing suits, or wearing an extra bathing suit with holes cut in the material.

Many swimmers also shave areas of exposed skin before end-of-season competitions to reduce friction in the water. The practice gained popularity after the 1956 Olympics, when Murray Rose and Jon Henricks came shaved and won gold medals for Australia. Freshly shaven skin is less resistant when in the water. In addition, a 1989 study demonstrated that shaving improves a swimmer's overall performance by reducing drag.

The disadvantages of using a drag suit include the depletion of proper stroke. This is caused by the swimmer's own fatigue. When the swimmer becomes more fatigued, different muscle groups become more tired. Consequently, the swimmer will try to engage another group of muscle to do the same thing, which can cause the stroke efficiency to drop.

==== Starting blocks ====
Starting blocks may be used at the beginning of a race. They are positioned so that a swimmer will start in a crouched over posture with one foot positioned further forwards than the other, and with both feet set at an angle. The swimmer pushes off the blocks as part of their initial dive in an asymmetric manner, with the rear foot leaving its block first and the front foot after. Typically, the front foot pushes off with a greater amount of overall force. Starting blocks allow for a swimmer to dive with greater force and start faster.

== Elite and international swimming ==
Elite and international swimming comprises the highest level of competition available to swimmers, including competitions such as the Olympic Games and the World Aquatics Championships.

=== Professionalism ===
Swimming creates a mix of levels, including: fully professional, semi-professional, and amateur. Fully professional swimmers will typically get a salary both from their national governing body and from outside sponsors, semi-professionals a small stipend from their national governing body, and amateurs receive no funding. Outside of these major championships prize money is low – the 2015 FINA World Cup series has a total prize fund of $3,000 per race shared between the top three and the 2014–15 USA Grand Prix Series $1,800 compared to the 2015 World Aquatics Championships fund of $60,000 per race shared between the top eight.

== Open-water swimming ==
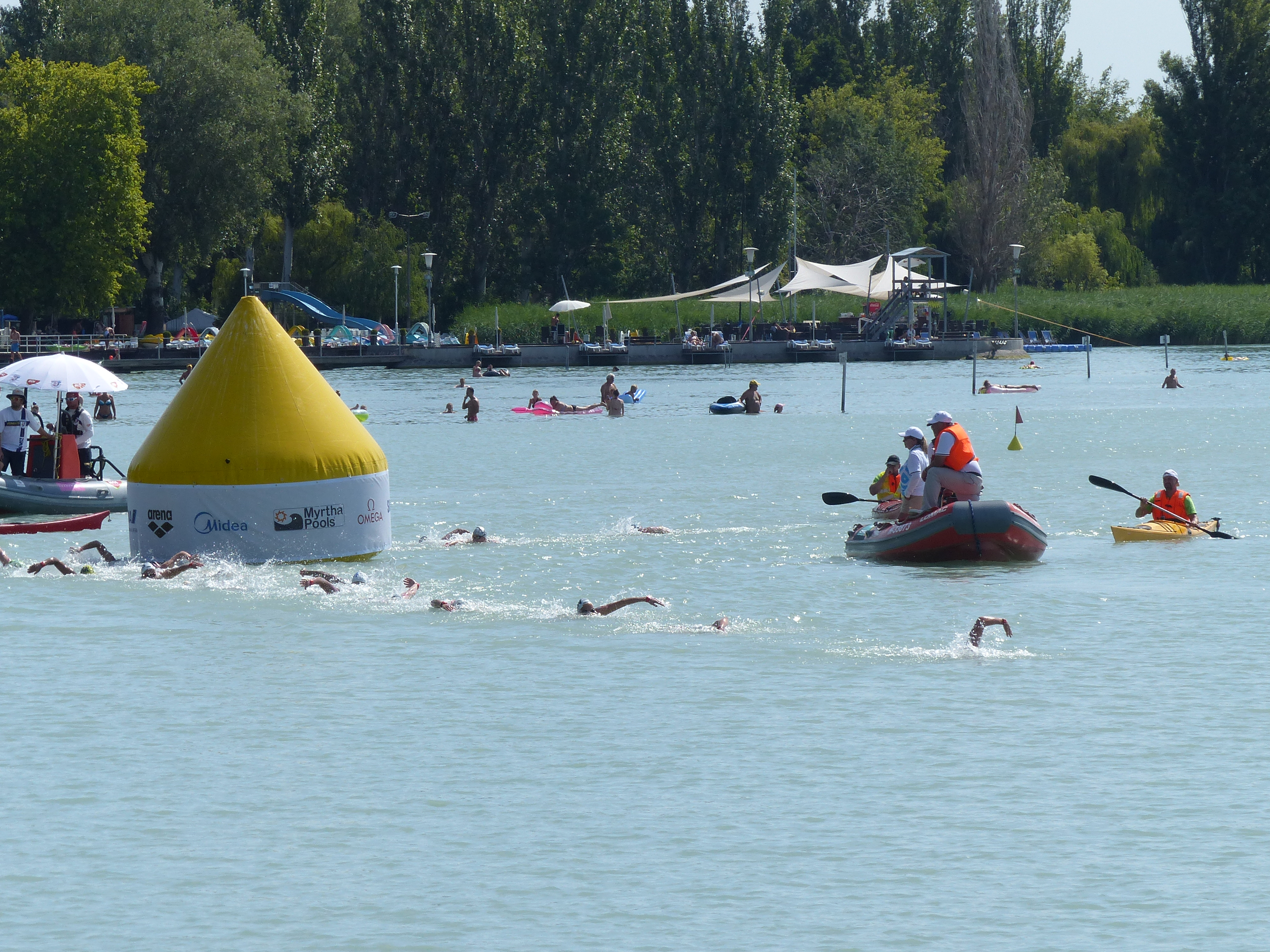
Swimmers must go around the yellow marked to count as a "lap"

Open water swimming is swimming outside a regular pool, usually in a lake, or sometimes ocean. Popularity of the sport has grown in recent years, particularly since the 10 km open water event was added as an Olympic event in 2005, contested for the first time in the 2008 Olympic Games in Beijing.

New recent technology has developed much faster swimsuits. Full body suits have been banned, but swimmers at the very top levels still wear suits that have been lasered together because stitching creates drag. The disadvantage of these suits is that they are often uncomfortable and tight, and can tear easily if not handled carefully.

The largest Ocean Swim's in terms of numbers of participants are in Australia, with the Pier to Pub, Cole Classic and Melbourne Swim Classic all with roughly 5000 swimming participants.

== Changes to the sport ==
Swimming times have dropped over the years due to superior training techniques and new technical developments.

The first four Olympics were not held in pools, but in open water (1896 – the Mediterranean, 1900 – the Seine river, 1904 – an artificial lake, 1906 – the Mediterranean). The 1904 Olympics' freestyle race was the only one ever measured at 100 yards, instead of the usual 100 meters. A 100-meter pool was built for the 1908 Olympics and sat in the center of the main stadium's track and field oval. The 1912 Olympics, held in the Stockholm harbor, marked the beginning of electronic timing.

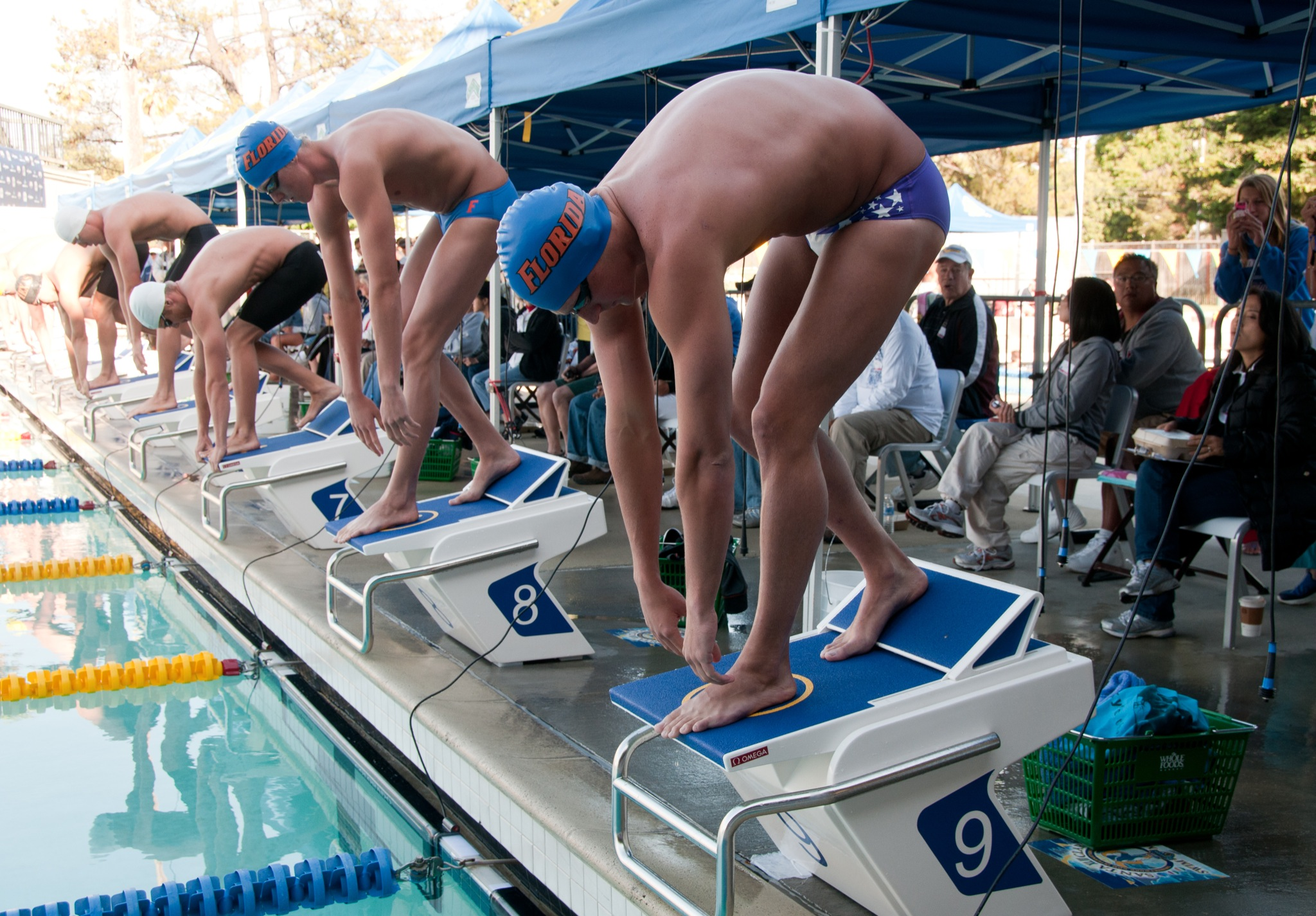
Olympian Ryan Lochte (near) standing on top of the wedged starting blocks. Each swimmer performs a preparatory isometric press by applying downward pressure onto their bent legs. This serves to preload the muscles and helps to make the subsequent dive more powerful.

Male swimmers wore full-body suits until the 1940s, which caused more drag in the water than their modern swimwear counterparts experience. Competition suits now include engineered fabric and designs to reduce swimmers' drag in the water and prevent athlete fatigue. In addition, over the years, pool designs have lessened the drag. Some design considerations allow for the reduction of swimming resistance, making the pool faster. These include proper pool depth, elimination of currents, increased lane width, energy absorbing racing lane lines and gutters, and the use of other innovative hydraulic, acoustic, and illumination designs. There have been major changes in starting blocks over the past years. Starting blocks used to be small, narrow and straight but through time they have become bigger and wider and nowadays the surface of the block is angled towards the swimming pool. In addition, starting blocks now have a "wedge" which is a raised, slanting platform situated at the rear of the main block. This enables the swimmer to adopt a crouched position at a 90 degrees angle and push off quicker with the rear leg to increase their launch power.

The 1924 Summer Olympics were the first to use the standard 50-meter pool with marked lanes. In the freestyle, swimmers originally dove from the pool walls, but diving blocks were incorporated at the 1936 Summer Olympics. The tumble turn was developed by the 1950s and goggles were first used in the 1976 Olympics.

There were also changes in the late 20th century in terms of technique. Breaststrokers are now allowed to dip their heads completely under water to glide, which allows for a longer stroke and faster time. However, the breaststrokers must bring their heads up at the completion of each cycle. In addition, a key hole pull in the breaststroke start and turns has been added to help speed up the stroke. Now off the start and turns, breaststrokers are allowed one butterfly kick to help increase their speed. This change was made official in December 2014. Backstrokers are now allowed to turn on their stomachs before the wall in order to perform a "flip-turn". Previously, they had to reach and flip backwards and a variation of it, known as a "bucket turn" or a "suicide turn", is sometimes used in individual medley events to transition from backstroke to breaststroke.

== Records ==
The foundation of FINA in 1908 signaled the commencement of recording the first official world records in swimming. At that time records could be established in any swimming pool of length not less than 25 yards, and records were also accepted for intermediate distance split times from long-distance events. Today World Records will only be accepted when times are reported by Automatic Officiating Equipment, or Semi-Automatic Officiating Equipment in the case of Automatic Officiating Equipment system malfunction.

Records in events such as 300 yd, 300 m, 1000 yd, and 1000 m freestyle, 400 m backstroke, and 400 m and 500 m breaststroke were no longer ratified from 1948. A further removal of the 500 yd and 500 m freestyle, 150 m backstroke, and 3×100 m medley relay from the record listings occurred in 1952.

In 1952, the national federations of the United States and Japan proposed at the FINA Congress the separation of records achieved in long-course and short-course pools; however, it was four more years before action came into effect with the Congress deciding to retain only records held in 50 m pools as the official world record listings.

By 1969 there were thirty-one events in which FINA recognised official world records – 16 for men, 15 for women – closely resembling the event schedule that was in use at the Olympic Games.

The increase in accuracy and reliability of electronic timing equipment led to the introduction of hundredths of a second to the time records from 21 August 1972.

Until 3 March 1991, world records in short course (25 m) pools were noted as "world best times" (WBTs) but not as "short course world records". On 31 October 1994, times in 50 m backstroke, breaststroke, and butterfly were added to the official record listings.

FINA currently recognises world records in these events for both men and women.

- Freestyle: 50 m, 100 m, 200 m, 400 m, 800 m, 1500 m
- Backstroke: 50 m, 100 m, 200 m
- Breaststroke: 50 m, 100 m, 200 m
- Butterfly: 50 m, 100 m, 200 m
- Individual medley: 100 m (short course only), 200 m, 400 m
- Relays: 4×50 m freestyle relay (short course only), 4×100 m freestyle, 4×200 m freestyle, 4×50 m medley relay (short course only), 4×100 m medley
- Mixed relays (teams of two men and two women): 4×50 m mixed freestyle (short course only), 4×100 m mixed freestyle (long course only), 4×50 m mixed medley (short course only), 4×100 m mixed medley (long course only)

=== Historical breakthroughs ===
— denotes instances that cannot be determined

Distance		Styles									
Distance		Freestyle		Backstroke		Breaststroke		Butterfly		Medley	
Distance		M	W	M	W	M	W	M	W	M	W
50m under 30 sec	50m pool	—	—	—	—	—	2009. Jessica Hardy	—	—		
50m under 30 sec	25m pool	—	—	—	—	—	2002. Emma Igelström	—	—		
100m under 1 min	50m pool	1922. Johnny Weissmuller	1962. Dawn Fraser	1964. Thompson Mann	2002. Natalie Coughlin	2001. Roman Sludnov	+4sec	1960. Lance Larson	1977. Christiane Knacke		
100m under 1 min	25m pool	—	—	—	—	—	+2.5sec	—	—	—	1999. Jenny Thompson
200m under 2 min	50m pool	1963. Don Schollander	1976. Kornelia Ender	1976. John Naber	+4sec	+7sec	+19sec	1976. Roger Pyttel	+2sec	1991. Tamás Darnyi	+6sec
200m under 2 min	25m pool	—	—	—	2014. Katinka Hosszú	+0.5sec	+14.5sec	—	2014. Mireia Belmonte	—	+2sec
400m under 4 min	50m pool	1973. Rick DeMont	2009. Federica Pellegrini							+4sec	+26sec
400m under 4 min	25m pool	—	2003. Lindsay Benko							2007. László Cseh	+19sec
800m under 8 min	50m pool	1979. Vladimir Salnikov	+5sec								
800m under 8 min	25m pool	—	2013. Mireia Belmonte								
1500m under 15 min	50m pool	1980. Vladimir Salnikov	+26sec								
1500m under 15 min	25m pool	—	+20sec								
4 × 100 m under 4 min	50m pool	1938. United States	1972. United States							1964. United States	2000. United States
4 × 200 m under 8 min	50m pool	1964. United States	1986. East Germany								

== Health benefits ==
Swimming is a healthy activity that can be done by most people throughout their life. It is a low-impact workout that has several mental and bodily health benefits all while being a good recreational activity. Swimming builds endurance, muscle strength, and cardiovascular fitness. Correspondingly, it also improves weight loss while being a safer alternative of working out for someone who is injured or for women who are pregnant. Swimming generally requires less effort than many other sports while still providing similar physical benefits.

The U.S. Census Bureau reports that two and a half hours per week of aerobic physical activity such as swimming can decrease the risk of chronic illnesses, and help regenerate healthy cells. Furthermore, swimming is linked to better cognitive function; also lowering the risk of Type II diabetes, high blood pressure, and a stroke. It can improve lung and heart strength while it tones muscles in a full body workout. People can typically exercise longer in water than on land without increased effort and minimal joint or muscle pain. When in the water the body undergoes less physical stress thus releasing pressure from the joints.

In addition to the physical benefits of swimming, lower stress levels and occurrences of depression and anxiety are known to decrease while swimming. Swimming is a meditation sport meaning there is an increase of blood flow to the brain which allows an individual to evaluate stressors more calmly. For those with dementia swimming has a number of positive benefits such as reducing anxiety and agitation, provides opportunities to socialize and contributes to a positive sense of self-worth.

== Common injuries ==
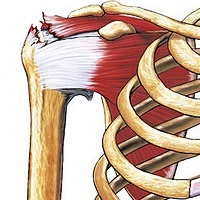
Here is where the rotator cuff is located, and what a tear would look like in the shoulder

Perhaps the most common injury to swimmers is repeated trauma and overuse of the rotator cuff in the shoulder. The joints are more prone to injury when the arm is repetitively used in a position above the horizontal line of the body. This position occurs in each of the four swimming strokes in every cycle of the arms. Out of the four tendons in the rotator cuff, the supraspinatus is most prone to tearing. Rotator cuff impingement is due to pressure on the rotator cuff from part of the scapula as the arm is raised.

The best way to prevent injury is catching the issue early. Typically, poor technique and over excessive use of the muscle group can be the primary causes of injury. Through communication between swimmers, coaches, parents, and medical professionals, problems can be diagnosed before a serious injury. Additionally, proper warm-up, stretches, and strength training exercises should be completed before any rigorous movements.

In treating a rotator cuff injury, the most important factor is time. Due to the nature of the joint being primarily stabilized by muscle and tendon, the injury must be fully healed to prevent recurrence. Returning to swimming or other demanding exercises too soon can result in degeneration of a tendon which might result in a rupture. During the rehabilitation period, focus should be placed on rotator cuff and scapular strengthening.

Another common injury is breaststroke knee, also known as swimmer's knee. This injury is caused by the kicking movement used while swimming breaststroke. The kicking movement will cause wear and tear on the knee and it will eventually lead to constant pain. In recent studies it has been found that initially, the pain is only experienced when the kick was executed, but eventually the pain spread to other regular day-to-day activities, athletic and non-athletic.

== See also ==
- Diving
- World Aquatics Championships
- Free Colchian
- Georgian swimming
- Lifeguard
- List of swimming styles
- List of water sports
- List of world records in swimming
- Sports nutrition
- Synchronized swimming
- Swimming at the Summer Olympics
- Swimwear and hygiene
- U.S. Masters Swimming
- Water aerobics
- Water polo
