= Free Colchian =

Georgian swimming style

Free Colchian (Georgian: კოლხური, ლაზური) is the name of a swimming style from Georgia.

This style (aka Colchian and Iberian) was revived by the swimmer Henry Kuprashvili by swimming 2 kilometers using military-training style of swimming “Hands and Feet bound Colchian” on January 28, 2001. In 2002, for the first time in history, he swam across the Dardanelles Strait in 3 hours and 15 minutes using "Hands and Feet bound Colchian" on August 30. Henry Kuprashvili laid foundation of Georgian styles of swimming study process and established the school of swimming.

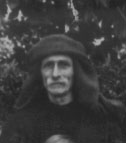
Levan Kursua 1887-1969 depicted in Ergeta

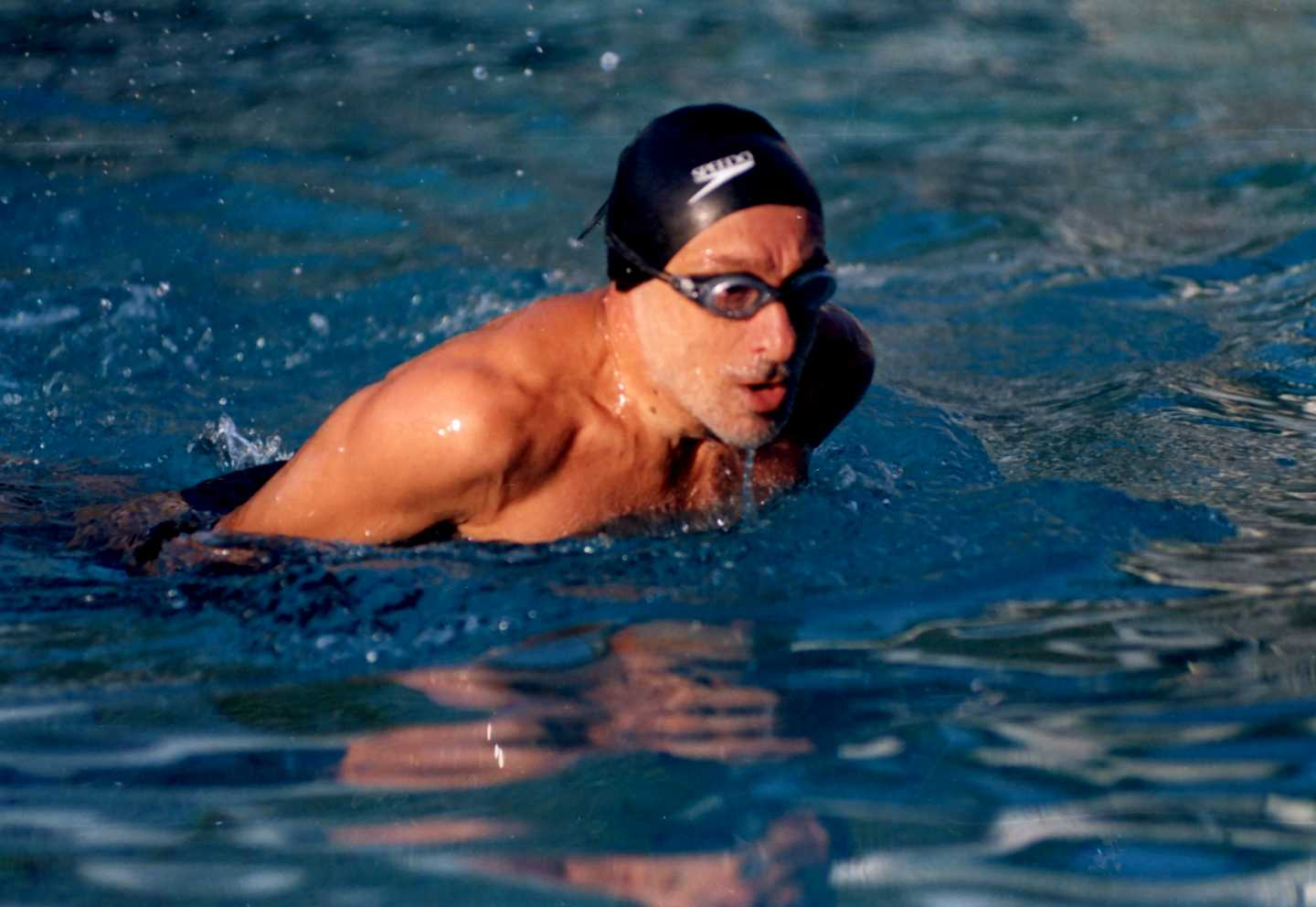
Henry Kuprashvili - 2002. Born. 1946

The Georgian style of swimming comprises several styles unique to Georgia: “Lazuri” (Free Colchian), “Hands and feet bound Colchian” (Military Colchian), “Apkhazuri” (Abkhazian), “Okribula”, “Iberiuli” (Iberian), “Takhvia” and partly “Khashuruli” and “Kizikuri”. More traditional movements of the extremities are restricted or barred and forward motion is accomplished by dolphin-like undulation of hips and paired feet. These styles emulate the motions of mammals such as the seal, dolphin, sea lion, whale, and beaver, which have evolved adaptations to water that enable them to attain an optimal swimming ability. For those familiar with competitive swimming styles, Free Colchian most closely resembles the butterfly stroke, but with the arms remaining at the swimmer's sides.

== Technique ==
While swimming Lazuri (Free Colchian) or sport style:

- The legs are pressed tightly together, the arms are pressed closely along the bodyline, the elbows should not jut out (to avoid excess resistance). The palms are touching the thighs;
- The pelvis-waist takes a particularly active part, the legs are also active supporters, especially from the viewpoint of balance, the arms do not take any part at all;
- Swimming starts with a simultaneous energetic lifting of the waist upward and movement of tightly placed legs downwards, during which the shoulder and the head move forward horizontally. At the same time feet get out of the extremely low position (they are not deep in water: not more than 10-12 degrees), the faster they leave the low position the weaker are the brake factors;
- The second phase starts instantly afterwards, during which the swimmer already in the initial position. Energetic blow is maximally powerful, forward sliding in water active and quick, which becomes more effective with energetic simultaneous movements, twice (or more times) of joined feet;
- Breathing in is made possible at the third movement of the pelvis and the feet, during which the shoulder zone usually moves straight, and the head is slightly raised above water with face and sight forward so that the mouth is slightly above the surface of the water to breathe in (it is possible to move the head right or left). The swimmer should follow the stream, without making any rough movements in order not to “disturb” water and cause unnecessary excessive hydrodynamic resistance. The swimmer should be in such control of this process, as well as water, to avoid occurrence of excessive hindering waves. (it’s possible to breathe in-out in 3 or more cycles, while breathing the swimmer may turn his head to right or left, at the swimmer’s convenience);
- To start a new cycle of the pelvis and feet movement the head returns to the initial position (breathing in and out can be made for 2-3 phases);
- During this phase the legs, movement forward is weaker than during the previous two and to overcome the rising waves resistance the feet glide on the water surface more, trying to keep the balance of the body in the upright position.

== Start ==
In Lazuri (Free Colchian) swimming starts like Free style (crawl), breaststroke and butterfly. But at initial condition, while start and going into the water hands are moved up straight to the body

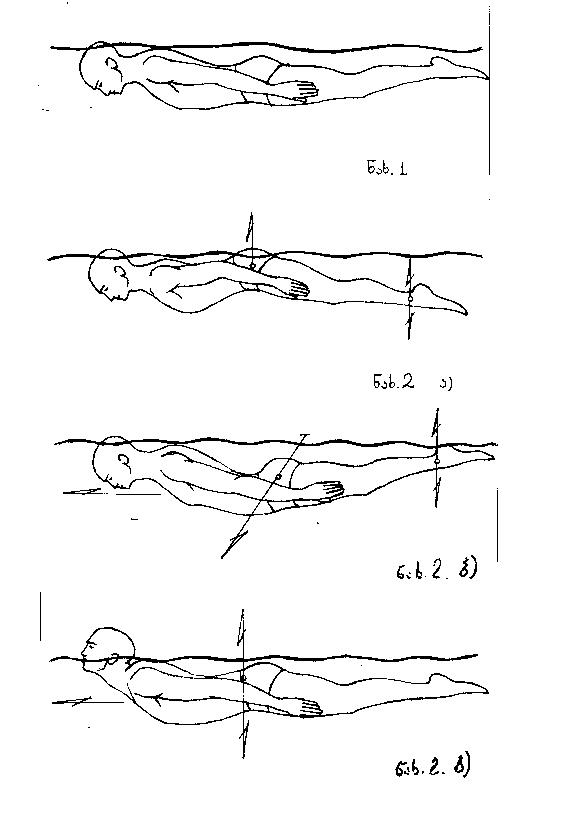

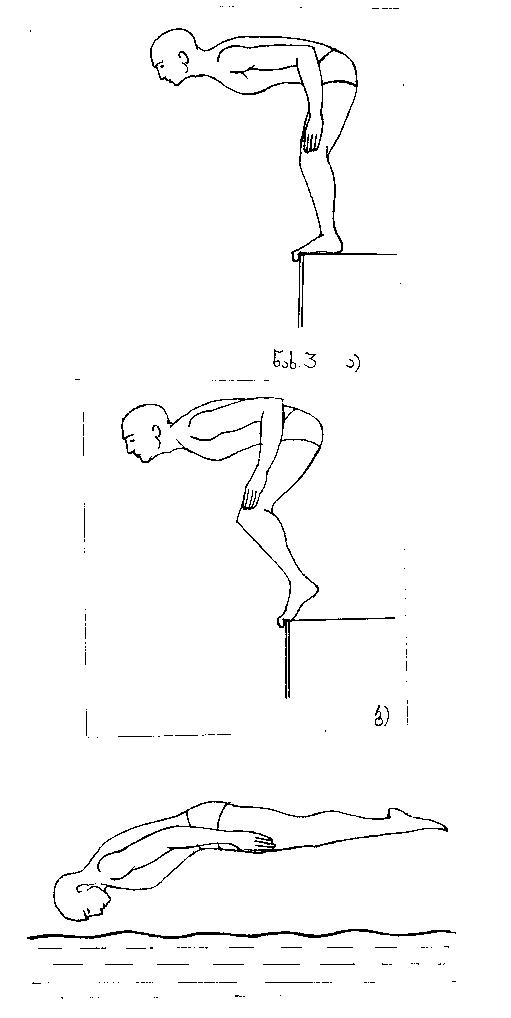

== Turning movement ==
Turning movement while swimming Lazuri (Free Colchian) is similar to that of the front crawl.

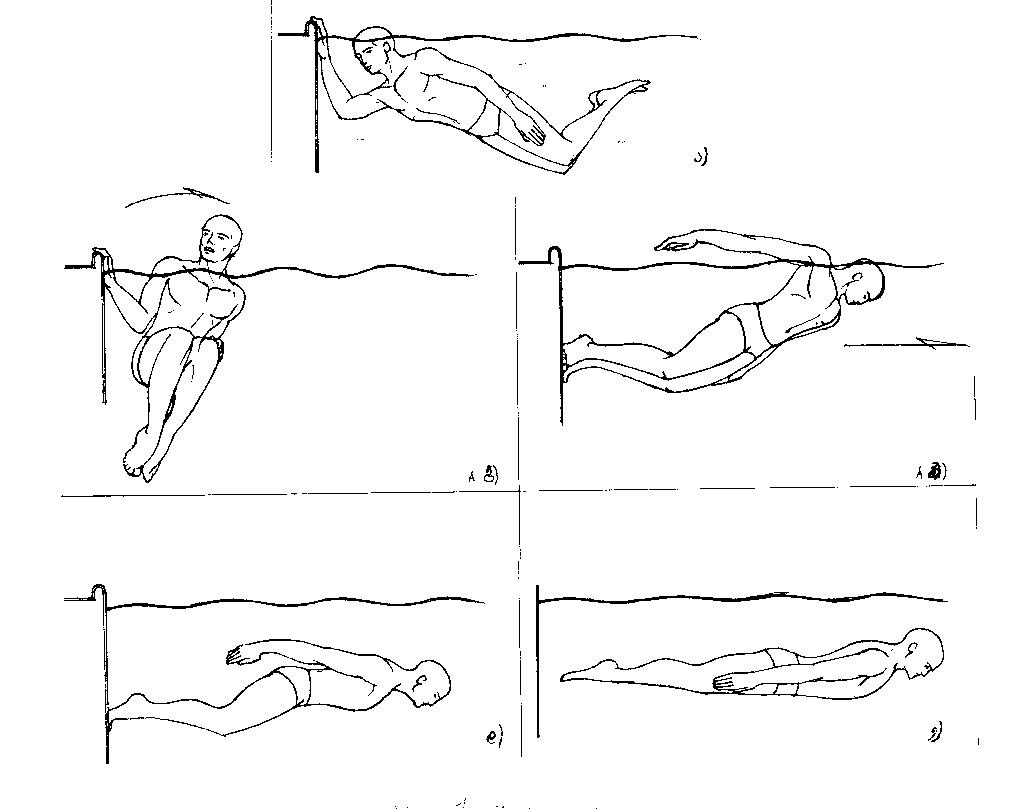

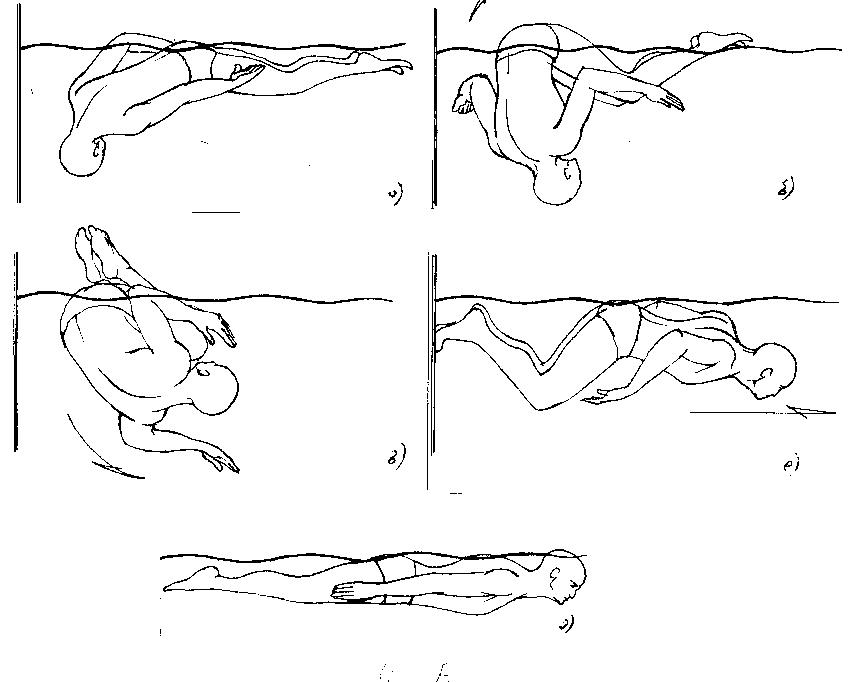
