= Kazbegi Marathon =

Race in Georgia

- Date: September 5, 2015
- Location: Kazbegi, Georgia
- Event type: Trail running
- Distance: Extreme, SkyRace, Fun Run
- Website: www.traillab.ge

Kazbegi Marathon is an annual trail marathon held in Georgia in September by team Traillab. The marathon is certified by International Trail Running Association (ITRA) and courses through the Caucasus Mountains in the northern part of the country, the starting and finishing points are in the town of Kazbegi located on the historical military road on the foot of Kazbegi Mountain. The Kazbegi Marathon is both the largest as well as the first racing event held in the Caucasus. Over the years since 2010 Kazbegi Marathon offered different routes. The 2021 edition of Kazbegi Marathon will feature a fun run (7 kilometers), SkyRace distance, 15km (with the elevation gain of 1,300m) and an Extreme distance, 35km (with the elevation gain of 3000m) which requires pre-qualification of each runner. The marathon is organized by TrailLab. The marathon is marketed to an international audience, previous races attracted participants from Germany, England, Japan, Germany, Kazakhstan, Israel. Many local runners and runners from the immediate neighboring Armenia, Azerbaijan, Turkey and Russia participate as well.

== Track ==
The race starts from the Kazbegi Museum. Runners first cross Kazbegi center and after running the bridge over Tergi River follow the uphill to the village Gergeti and Gergeti Trinity Church. From the church there are views of the Great Caucasus Mountains. Runners then follow the downhill of narrow gorges to the village Gergeti and continue their race along the River Tergi towards the village Karkucha. They run through the villages of Pansheti, Arsha and continue to the village Achkhoti. Crossing the village, runners follow the secondary roads through the priming surface to the Sno Gorge towards the village Sno, later along the River Snostkali they reach the villages of Akhaltsikhe and Karkucha. The runners continue running till the rise of Juta village, after that runners take the same way back to the village Achkhoti and the following 2 km they'll run in a field, next 3 km – along the highway, afterwards in the streets of Stepantsminda town. Runners run through a short marshy distance (100m) and the last kilometer follows the alleys of Kazbegi itself.

== History ==
Kazbegi Marathon is an initiative of an Israeli touring company, which dates back to 2010. The first Kazbegi Marathon took place on September 10, 2010, in which over 150 international runners participated.

The second Kazbegi Marathon took place exactly one year later, attracting 300 participants, among them the British and Swiss ambassadors in Georgia.

In 2014, Kazbegi Marathon had the 5th anniversary.

Next 12th Kazbegi Marathon will be held on 5th of September, 2021.

== Photographs ==
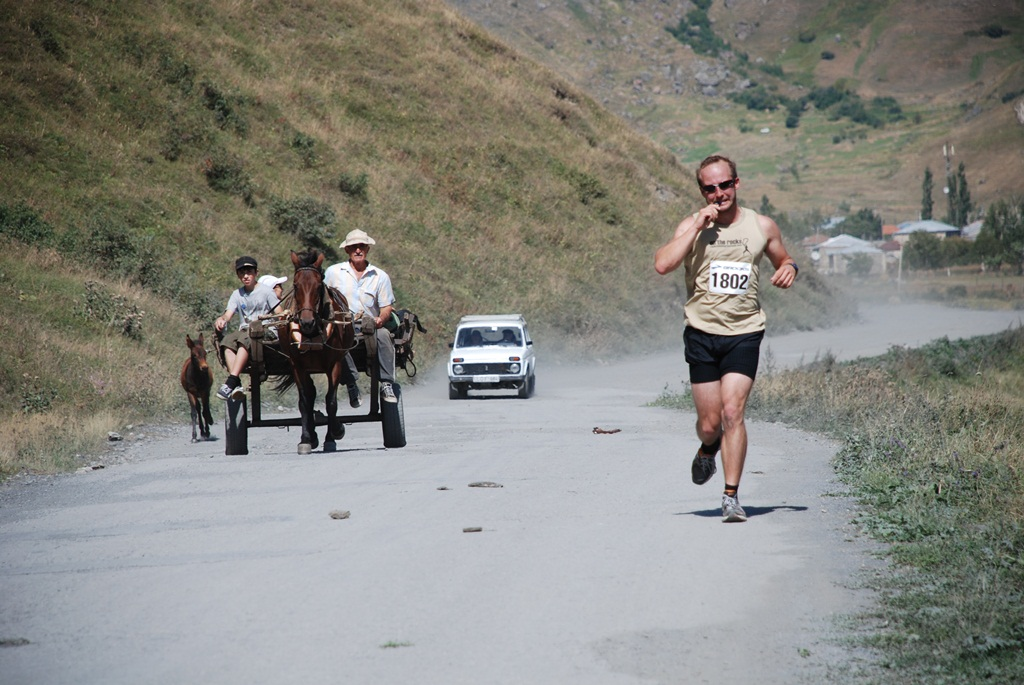
The Race

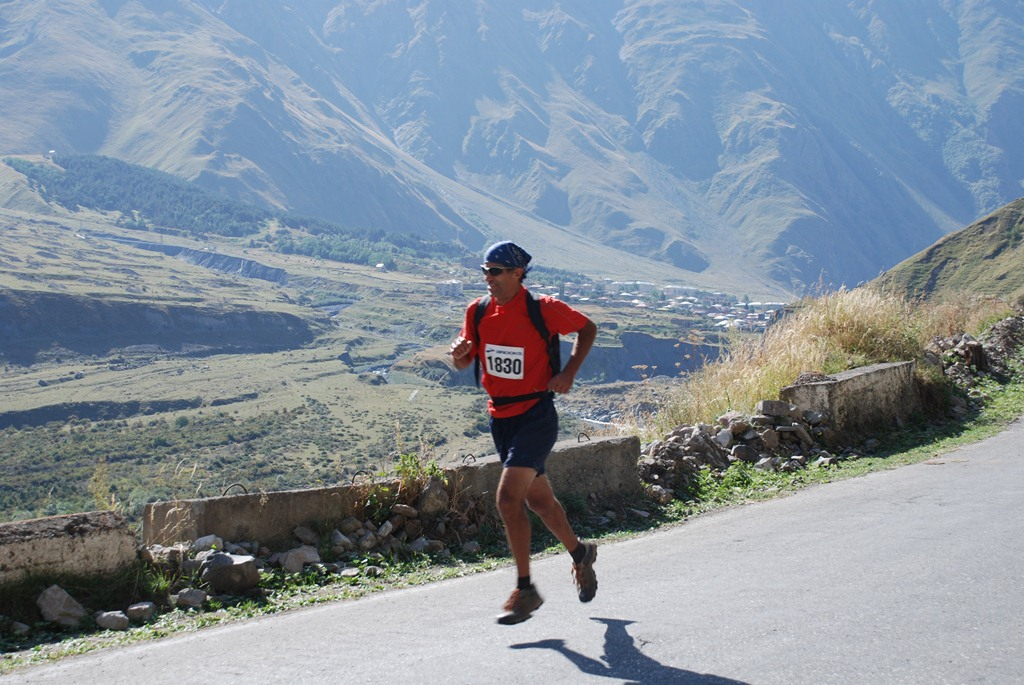
The Race

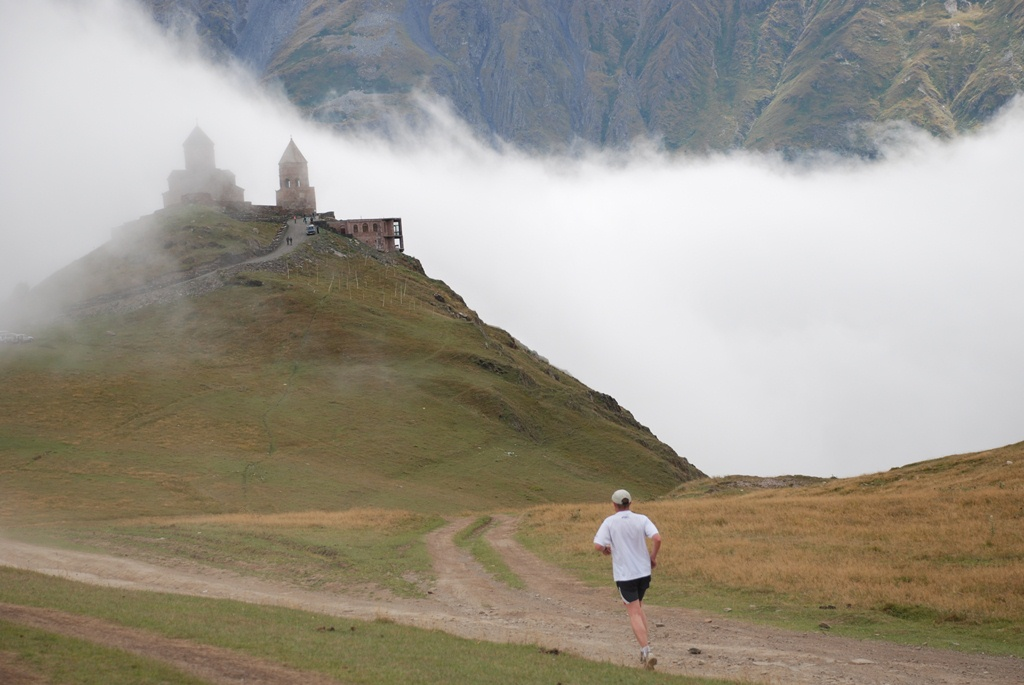
The Race

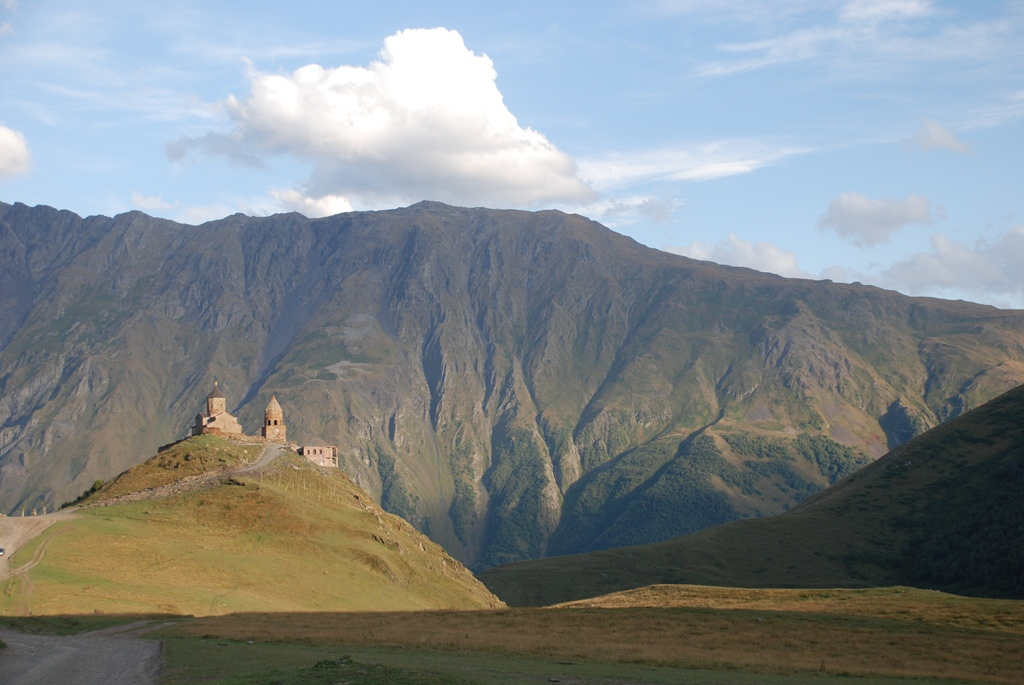
Mt. Kazbegi and the Trinity Church
