= Bikini in popular culture =

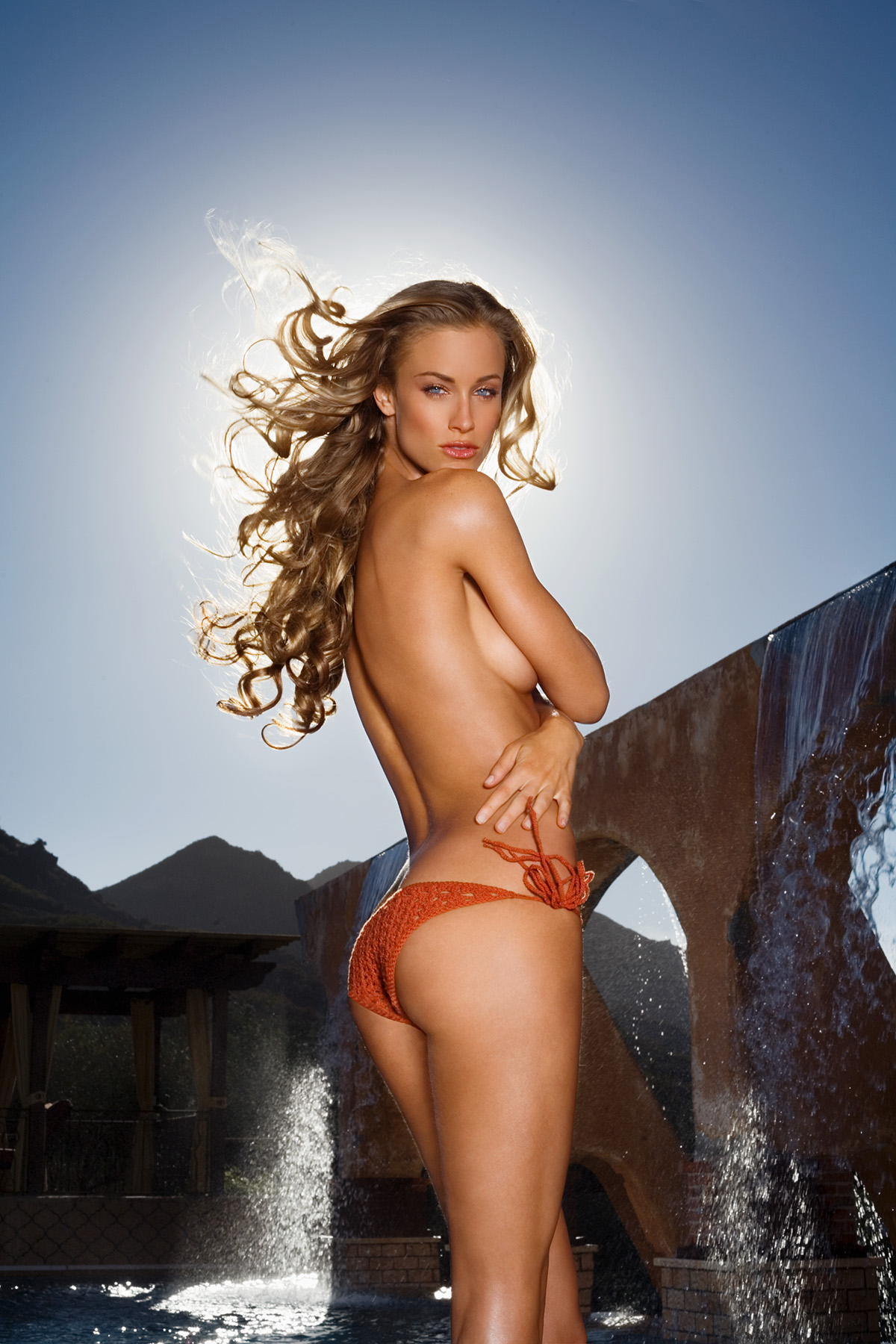
Michele Merkin in a Bikini

The modern bikini first appeared in 1946, and since then it has become a part of popular culture. It is one of the most widely worn women's swimsuits, used for swimming and in a variety of other contexts. Today, bikinis appear in competitions, films, magazines, music, literature, and video games. Despite the availability of more revealing glamour wear, bikini modeling remains popular and can still create controversy. Portrayals of the bikini in popular culture led, to a large extent, to its acceptance by Western society at large. In 1960, Brian Hyland's pop song "Itsy Bitsy Teenie Weenie Yellow Polkadot Bikini" inspired a bikini-buying spree. The white bikini worn by Ursula Andress as Honey Ryder in the 1962 James Bond film Dr. No has been cited as one of the most famous bikinis of all time. By 1963, the movie Beach Party, starring Annette Funicello and Frankie Avalon, led a wave of films that made the bikini a pop-culture symbol. Playboy first featured a bikini on its cover in 1962. The Sports Illustrated Swimsuit Issue debuted two years later. This increasing popularity was reinforced by its appearance in such contemporary films as How to Stuff a Wild Bikini featuring Annette Funicello and One Million Years B.C. (1966) featuring Raquel Welch. Raquel Welch's fur bikini in One Million Years B.C. became a famous moment in cinema history. Hollywood stars such as Marilyn Monroe, Jayne Mansfield, Gina Lollobrigida and Jane Russell further helped the growing popularity of bikinis. Pin up posters of Monroe and Mansfield, as well as Hayworth, Bardot and Raquel Welch distributed around the world contributed significantly to the popularity of the bikini.

== Bikini contests ==
Newsreel of a Dutch bikini contest, 1971

Footage of a Korean bikini contest, 2018

Bikini contests are a form of adult entertainment where women compete against each other in bikinis as beauty contests. They can take place in bars, nightclubs, strip clubs, on beaches, and at beauty pageants, as well as during intermissions of boxing or wrestling matches, and at car shows. Bodybuilding competitions may also feature bikini contest segments. It is becoming more common for women to wear bikinis at swimsuit competitions. Bikini contests can also take place over the Internet by women submitting pictures of themselves in bikinis.

Bikini contests may be organised or sponsored by related companies for marketing purposes or to try to find and attract new talent to promote their products. Miss Hawaiian Tropic is organized by Playtex to promote "Hawaiian Tropic", its suntan lotion. NOPI runs the annual "Hot Import Nights" bikini contest, which is held in conjunction with the import car-show in Atlanta, Georgia, and the annual Hooters bikini competition.

Some contestants in bikini contests undergo plastic surgery for breast and lip augmentations. Bikini contests can still generate controversy in some parts of the world. When Mariyah Moten competed in the Miss Bikini of the Universe pageant in Beihai, China in 2006, she was the first Pakistani girl to participate in a bikini pageant, creating outrage in her home country. She also became the most photographed participant of the contest and won the Best in Media/Miss Press title. A year later she was 2nd Runner-up in the Miss Asia International contest and Miss Asia World, and was featured on the cover of Sexy South Asian Girls 2007 calendar.

== Bikini in major beauty pageants ==
=== Miss World ===
==== Origin ====
In 1951, the first Miss World contest, originally the Festival Bikini Contest, was organized by Eric Morley as a mid-century advertisement for swimwear at the Festival of Britain. The press welcomed the spectacle and referred to it as Miss World, and Morley registered the name as a trademark. When the winner Kiki Håkansson from Sweden was crowned in a bikini, countries with religious traditions threatened to withdraw delegates. Håkansson remains the first and last Miss World to be crowned in her bikini, a crowning that was condemned by Pope Pius XII who declared the swimsuit to be sinful. Bikinis were outlawed from the pageant and evening gowns introduced instead. After the controversy, bikinis were banned from other beauty pageants around the world as well.

==== Controversy ====
Bikinis reappeared in later contests amid additional controversy. In the 1970s and 1980s the contest was regularly picketed by feminist protesters, who distributed flyers against the indecency of the contest. The pageant disappeared for a while and in 1996, when the Miss World contest was held in Bangalore, India, dozens of Indian groups who opposed the event claimed that the contest degraded women by featuring them in bikinis. Social activist Subhashini Ali commented, "It's not an IQ test. Neither is it a charity show. It's a beauty contest in which these things have been added on as sops." The protests were so intense that the organizers were finally compelled to shift the venue of the "Swimsuit Round" to Seychelles. Countering these claims, the contest organizer says that the organization has raised £300 million for charity in many of the countries where it operates since 2000. Feminist groups published fliers against bikinis in the contest in 1970.

In 2013, the Miss World event is to be hosted by Indonesia, the world's largest Muslim-majority country. The country's top Muslim clerical body, the Indonesian Ulema Council, suggested that the event should be cancelled because it promotes "hedonism, materialism, and consumerism", and is nothing but "an excuse to show women's body parts that should remain covered." The organizers later announced that the bikini would be replaced by one-piece swimsuits and even sarongs, traditional beachwear on the resort island of Bali. Critics accuse the Miss World organizers of caving to extremist pressures. They point out that Bali is a destination for tourists from across the world who often wear minimal swimwear.

=== Miss Earth ===
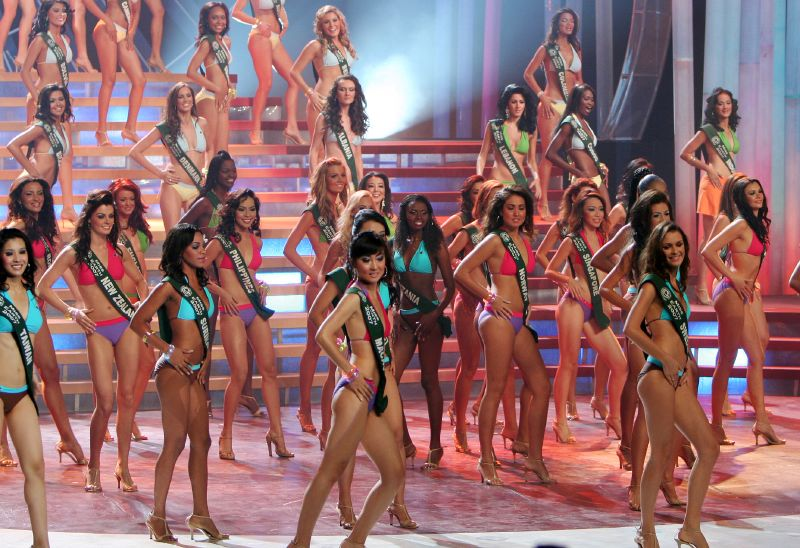
Bikini in 2007 Miss Earth contest in the Philippines

Vida Samadzai was the 2003 Afghani contestant for the Miss Earth title. She was severely condemned by both the Afghan authorities and community for seeking the title. Samadzai was born in Afghanistan but raised in the United States. She was living in India at the time of the contest. The Afghan Supreme Court banned swimsuit contests and said that appearing naked in beauty contests is completely un-Islamic, and is against Afghan tradition, human honour and dignity. Habiba Sarabi, the Afghan women affairs minister, said of the event "appearing naked before a camera or television is not women's freedom but in my opinion is to entertain men". Afghanistan's embassy in Washington DC declared that claims by Afghan American Samadzai to represent Afghanistan is baseless. Samadzai, the second woman to be crowned Miss Afghanistan after Zohra Daoud's crowning in 1972, received a number of death threats and had to be under the protection of FBI for three months. She said she was a bit uncomfortable wearing the "70s style red bikini" and was aware of the risks involved. Curiously, when Samdzai's compatriot Zallascht Sadat won the crown of Miss Deutschland 2010, which she kept through 2011 because the contest was not held that year, wearing a bikini, before going on to become Miss Globe 2012, there was not much controversy.

=== Miss America ===
==== Era of one-piece swimsuits ====
Miss America began as a swimsuit competition between eight contestants in Atlantic City, New Jersey in 1921 as National Beauty Pageant Tournament, bikinis were dropped from its list of acceptable swimwear in 1947. After the bikini is introduced in Paris in 1946, Miss America contestants are issued identical two-piece swimsuits that clearly show their midriff. The following year, the two-piece swimsuits are replaced with identical cable-knit swimsuits. The pageant grew to include formalwear and talent and its popularity increased. Swimsuits issued by the pageant were nicknamed "bulletproof vests". Two of the 17 swimsuit finalists wore two-piece swimsuits, and Erika Kauffman, representing Hawaii, wore the briefest bikini of all and won the swimsuit competition. In 1949 the Los Angeles Times reported that Miss America BeBe Shopp on her visit to Paris said she did not approve the bikini for American girls, though she did not mind French girls wearing them. Feminist protesters protested against that swimsuit in the 1960s and 1970s. In 1994 Miss America Organization asked viewers to vote to decide whether to keep the swimsuit round. Viewers overwhelmingly voted to keep it.

==== Era of the bikini ====
In 1997, 51 years after the bikini's debut, and 77 years after the Miss America Pageant was founded, the 51 contestants in the contest were, for the first time, allowed to pick their own swimsuits. On September 9, 1997, Miss Maryland Jamie Fox became the first contestant in 50 years to compete in a two-piece swimsuit during the Preliminary Swimsuit Competition at the Miss America Pageant.

=== Various major pageants ===
Founded	Pageant	Organizer	Location	Bikini allowed	Bikini regulation	Bikini controversy
1921	Miss America	Miss America Organization	Atlantic City, New Jersey	1997	Contestants are allowed to wear bikinis after a fifty-year ban imposed in 1947.	1947: Bikinis were outlawed because of Roman Catholic protesters.
1951	Miss World	Eric Morley	London, England	1952	Has toned down its swimsuits to more modest designs from the bikinis of its inaugural year.	1951: The first winner Kiki Håkansson from Sweden was crowned in a bikini. countries with religious traditions threatened to withdraw delegates. Pope Pius XII condemned the crowning as sinful. 1996: Miss World contest was held in Bangalore, India, but "Swimsuit Round" was shifted to Seychelles because of intense protests. 2013: The swimsuit round was dropped because of Islamist protests in Bali, Indonesia, where the contest took place.
1952	Miss Universe	Donald Trump	New York City	1997	Contestants are allowed to wear bikinis after a fifty-year ban imposed in 1947.	1996: Alya Rohali, the first Puteri Indonesia was withdrawn from the competition.
1952	Miss USA	Donald Trump	New York City	1997	Contestants are allowed to wear bikinis after a fifty-year ban imposed in 1947. Tankinis were provided as an option for the first (and last) time in 2000.	–
1983	Miss Teen USA	Gulf+Western	Palm Springs, California	1997	Contestants are allowed to wear bikinis. Tankinis were provided as an option for the first (and last) time in 2000.	–
2001	Miss Earth	Carousel Productions	Quezon City, Philippines	2003	–	2003: Vida Samadzai from Afghanistan participating in a bikini caused an uproar in her native country.

== Movies ==
=== Beach party films ===
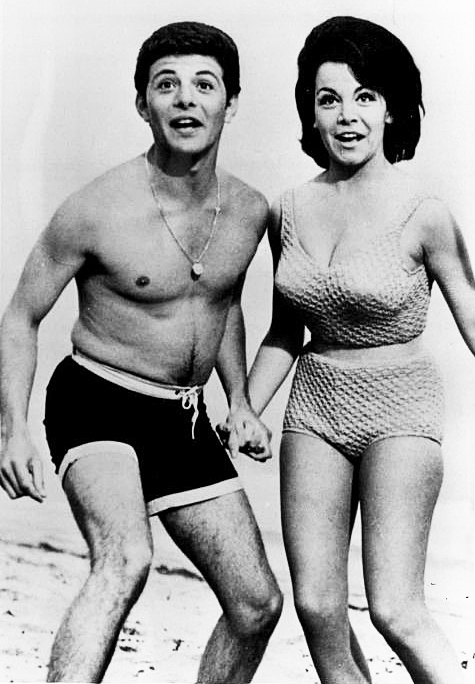
Frankie Avalon and Annette Funicello during the Beach Party film, Beach Blanket Bingo (1965)

Beach Party films were an American 1960s genre of feature films which often starred Annette Funicello and Frankie Avalon. Walt Disney reluctantly consented to Funicello, a former main cast member of The Mickey Mouse Club, wearing a bikini. The series was originally intended as a low-budget imitation of both the Elvis Presley musical and the Doris Day sex comedy, aimed at the teen market, but they ended up taking on a life of their own. The "classic" series was produced by American International Pictures (AIP), and imitated in turn by numerous other studios. AIP produced a series of seven beach films: Beach Party (1963), Muscle Beach Party (1963), Bikini Beach (1964), Pajama Party (1964), Beach Blanket Bingo (1965), How to Stuff a Wild Bikini (1965), and The Ghost in the Invisible Bikini (1966).

The 1965 AIP film Ski Party (with Dwayne Hickman, Yvonne Craig, Lesley Gore and James Brown) employed many of the same actors and schticks, only transplanted to a ski resort in the Sawtooth National Forest. Susan Hart, wife of AIP co-founder James H. Nicholson, was in The Ghost in the Invisible Bikini and Dr. Goldfoot and the Bikini Machine as well as two non-AIP beach films, For Those Who Think Young and Ride the Wild Surf.

The 1996 movie That Thing You Do! touches briefly on the phenomenon, with the Wonders making an appearance in a fictional beach party movie, Weekend at Party Pier. A 2001 episode of Sabrina, the Teenage Witch ("Beach Blanket Bizarro") also paid homage to the series, with Avalon appearing as himself. Avalon and Funicello starred in Paramount Pictures Back to the Beach in 1987, playing off their original roles and subsequent careers. Kelly Killoren Bensimon wrote in The Bikini Book, "It was really all about Annette Funicello. If the girl next door wanted to wear a bikini, then everybody wanted to wear a bikini. We didn't want to be a bad Bond girl. We all really wanted to be the good girl." However, when Annette Funicello was cast in her first beach movie Beach Party (1963), Walt Disney, who held her contract, insisted that she only wear modest bathing suits and keep her navel covered, to preserve her wholesome persona, though she was the only one of the ample number of young women in the film not showing her navel.

=== Film bikinis ===
Time magazine list of top 10 bikinis in popular culture

Micheline Bernardini models the first-ever Bikini (1946)
"Itsy Bitsy Teenie Weenie Yellow Polka Dot Bikini" (1960)
Annette Funicello and Beach Party (1960s)
The belted Bond girl bikini (1962)
Sports Illustrated's first Swimsuit Issue (1964)
Raquel Welch's fur bikini in One Million Years B.C. (1966)
Phoebe Cates' bikini in Fast Times at Ridgemont High
Princess Leia's golden bikini in Return of the Jedi (1983)
The official uniform of the female Olympic Beach Volleyball players (1996)
Miss America pageant's bikini debut (1997)

— Source: Chris Gayomali, "Top 10 Bikinis in Pop Culture", Time online, 07-05-2011

In the 1962 film Dr. No, a Bond girl named Honey Ryder played by Ursula Andress emerges from the sea wearing a white bikini. The Dr. No bikini scene has been quoted as one of the most memorable scenes from the British spy film series. That white bikini has been described as a "defining moment in the sixties liberalization of screen eroticism". It is regarded as one of the most important bikinis in history as sales of the two piece bikini rocketed after the appearance of Andress in Dr. No. Channel 4 declared it the top bikini moment in film history, Virgin Media puts it ninth in its top ten, and top in the Bond girls. The Herald (Glasgow) put the scene as best ever on the basis of a poll. British Broadcasting Corporation observed, "So iconic was the look that it was repeated 40 years later by Halle Berry in the Bond movie Die Another Day." In a survey of 1000 women to celebrate the 60th anniversary of the bikini, Andress in her white bikini was voted "The Ultimate Bikini Goddess".

It also helped shape the career of Andress, and the look of the quintessential Bond movie. Andress said that she owed her career to that white bikini, remarking, "This bikini made me into a success. As a result of starring in Dr. No as the first Bond girl, I was given the freedom to take my pick of future roles and to become financially independent." Because of the shocking effect from how revealing it was at the time, she got referred to by the joke nickname "Ursula Undress". In 2001, the Dr. No bikini worn by Andress in the film sold at auction for US$61,500.

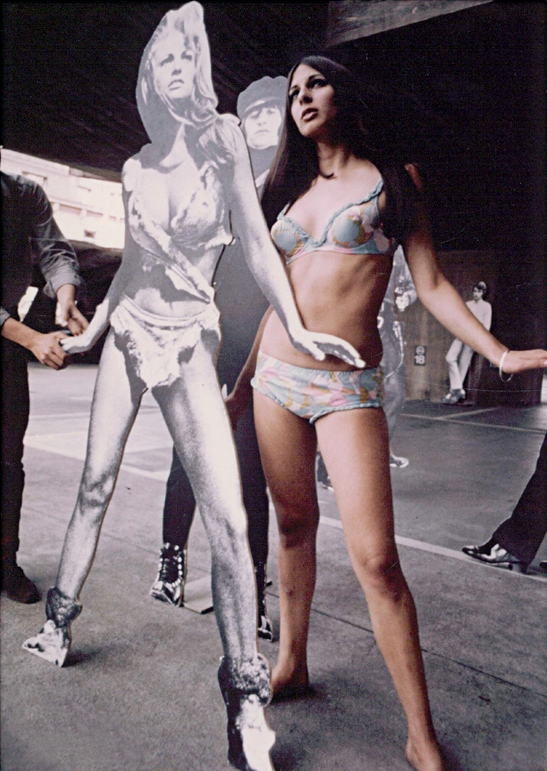
Publicity photograph featuring the fur bikini worn by Raquel Welch in One Million Years B.C. (1966)

Raquel Welch wore a fur bikini in One Million Years B.C. (1966) that made her an instant pin-up girl. Welch was featured in the studio's advertising as "wearing mankind's first bikini" and the bikini was later described as a "definitive look of the 1960s". She was strategically promoted to increase the value of the film by repeating "Raquel Welch in a fur bikini" five times in the trailer making it the reason to watch the film. Her role wearing the leather bikini raised Welch to a fashion icon and the photo of her in the bikini became a best-selling pinup poster. One author said, "although she had only three lines in the film, her luscious figure in a fur bikini made her a star and the dream girl of millions of young moviegoers". When Phoebe Cates dropped her red bikini in teen film Fast Times at Ridgemont High (1982), it became "the most memorable bikini-drop in cinema history." The bikini scenes in B.C. and Fast Times were ranked 86 and 84 in Channel 4 (UK)'s list of the 100 Greatest Sexy Moments in Film. In 2011, Time listed both Welch's B.C. and Cates' Ridgemont High bikinis in the "Top Ten Bikinis in Pop Culture".

In the 1983 film Return of the Jedi, Princess Leia (played by Carrie Fisher) wears a metal bikini, a slave girl costume often imitated by female fans at Star Wars conventions. The metal string bikini consisted of a patterned copper brassiere with a curved, plunging neckline that fastened behind the neck and back with string. The thong bottom had copper plates at the groin in front and back partially covered by a red silk loincloth. Leia wore high leather boots, a hair fastener that positioned her braided ponytail to cascade over her right shoulder, two bracelets, and a snake arm-wrap. She also wore a chain and collar that bound her to Jabba the Hutt, her captor, which she used to kill him. The costume was made of brass and was so uncomfortable that actress Carrie Fisher described it as "what supermodels will eventually wear in the seventh ring of hell." The slave Leia costume has been elevated to pop culture icon status, spawning various spoofs and parodies (including the episode of Friends, "The One with the Princess Leia Fantasy").

Actresses fighting in bikinis in movies like Charlie's Angels: Full Throttle and Blue Crush have made the two-piece, according to Gina Bellafonte of The New York Times, "the millennial equivalent of the power suit." The Full Throttle scene showing actress Demi Moore walking out of the ocean wearing a bikini was credited with reviving her career. In the film Varsity Blues (1999), Ali Larter attempts to seduce James Van Der Beek sporting a "bikini" made of whipped cream over her otherwise naked body. In the film Not Another Teen Movie, Chris Evans tries to recreate that scene.

=== Bikini films ===
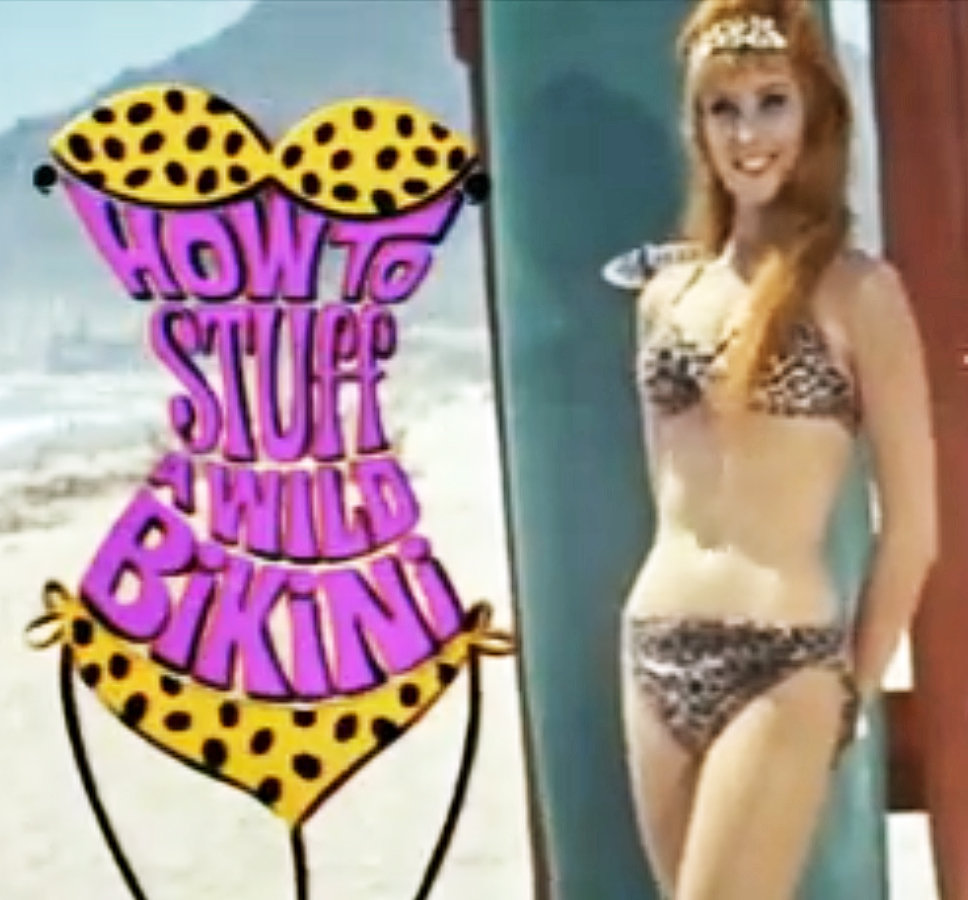
Screenshot from trailer of How to Stuff a Wild Bikini, featuring Beverly Adams

Bikini Bloodbath (2006), Bikini Cavegirl (2004), Bikini Bandits (2002, featuring Dee Dee Ramone) Never Say Never Mind: The Swedish Bikini Team (2001, featuring the Swedish Bikini Team), the bikini car wash series including The Bikini Carwash Company (1992), Bikini Hotel (1997), Bikini Island (1991), Dangerous Curves (1988), Slave Girls from Beyond Infinity (1987), It's a Bikini World (distributed by AIP, 1967), Operation Bikini (produced by AIP, 1963, featuring Frankie Avalon), and Bikini Baby (1951) are some of the many films with plotlines revolving around the bikini.

Among non-English films Yit long kau oi jin (US title: Beach Spike, Hong Kong, 2011), Bikinisesongen (US title: The bikini season, Norway, 1994), Poveri ma belli (UK title: A Girl in Bikini, Italy, 1957), and Manina, la fille sans voiles (US title: Manina, the Girl in the Bikini, France, 1952, featuring Brigitte Bardot) are some of the films that revolve around the bikini.

=== Movie poster ===
The promotional cinema poster for For Your Eyes Only (1981), the twelfth spy film in the James Bond series, featured a woman holding a crossbow photographed from behind in a bikini bottom with half of her buttocks exposed. Morgan Kane, the photographer, achieved the skimpy look by making model wear her bikini bottom backwards. The poster caused some furor – largely in the US – with The Boston Globe and the Los Angeles Times edited out everything above the knee, while the Pittsburgh Press editors painted a pair of shorts over the legs. There was significant speculation as to identity of the model with three models claimed the thighs in question – Nancy Stafford, Jane Sumner and Joyce Bartle – before photographer Morgan Kane identified the model to be Bartle, though the arm holding a crossbow belongs to Sumner.

== Music ==
As people with roots in the Indian subcontinent who reside in the Caribbean and other places were more receptive of the bikini than people of their original homeland, bikinis remain a repeating theme in Calypso music ("Whole day she jumping shamelessly/In a tiny little bikini" etc.). Australian pop-rock band Screaming Bikini (led by Sarah McLeod), Hungarian rock band Bikini, American dance-rock band Bikini Robot Army, punk rock band Bikini Kill and Los Angeles based electropop duo Cherry Bikini – all had names inspired by the bikini. In 1997 the French-German Electronic band Stereo Total released an album named Monokini. Spanish rock band Hombres G released its seventh album Historia del bikini in 1992. In 1994, Martinis and Bikinis, the seventh (studio) album from American singer-songwriter Sam Phillips, came out. Dutch breakcore musician Bong-Ra released his album Bikini Bandits, Kill! Kill! Kill! in 2003.

=== Songs ===
"Itsy Bitsy Teenie Weenie Yellow Polka Dot Bikini", a single written by Paul Vance and Lee Pockriss, has become a part of the history of the bikini. Released on August 8, 1960, it was also the first single sung by Brian Hyland to enter Billboard Hot 100. The song features in 1961 Billy Wilder film comedy One, Two, Three, as well as films like Sister Act 2 and Revenge of the Nerds II: Nerds in Paradise. It also features in commercials for Yoplait light yogurt, YWCA, and TV Easy magazine. "Do The Bikini Dance", a single by Dee Dee Ramone, was released on the day Ramones were inducted into the Rock And Roll Hall of Fame in 2002. "Bikini Girls with Machine Guns" is a song released by the American garage punk band The Cramps in 1990.

=== Performances ===
At the MTV Video Music Award (VMA) in 2013, pop stars Lady Gaga and Miley Cyrus appeared on stage in bikinis. Gaga appeared in a white seashell string bikini and Cyrus in a flesh colored latex bikini. Pop star Britney Spears, who won a Celebuzz poll as the best bikini body over Kate Upton, Jessica Alba and Holly Madison and stripped down a to black bikini in Late Show Top Ten List hosted by David Letterman, performed at VMA 2007 in a rhinestone bikini. Pop star Beyoncé Knowles, winner of the VH1 celebrity bikini award in 2012, appeared on the cover of Sports Illustrated Swimsuit Issue (February 2013) and modeled for H&M bikini line (Summer 2013), including a black two-piece bikini with tassels that she helped design.

Concerts

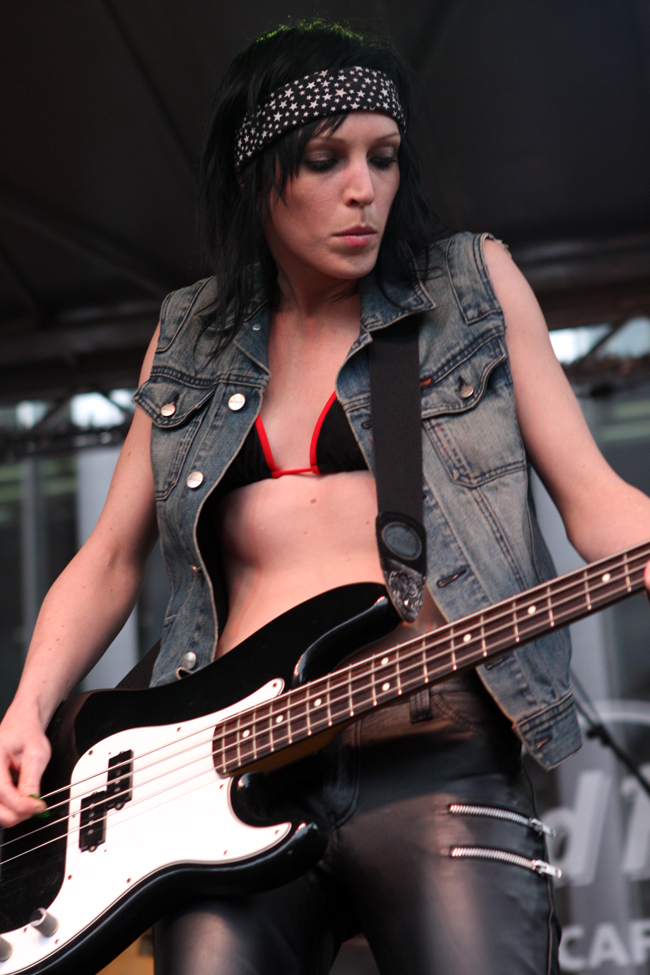
Screaming Bikini at Hard Rock Cafe, Orlando

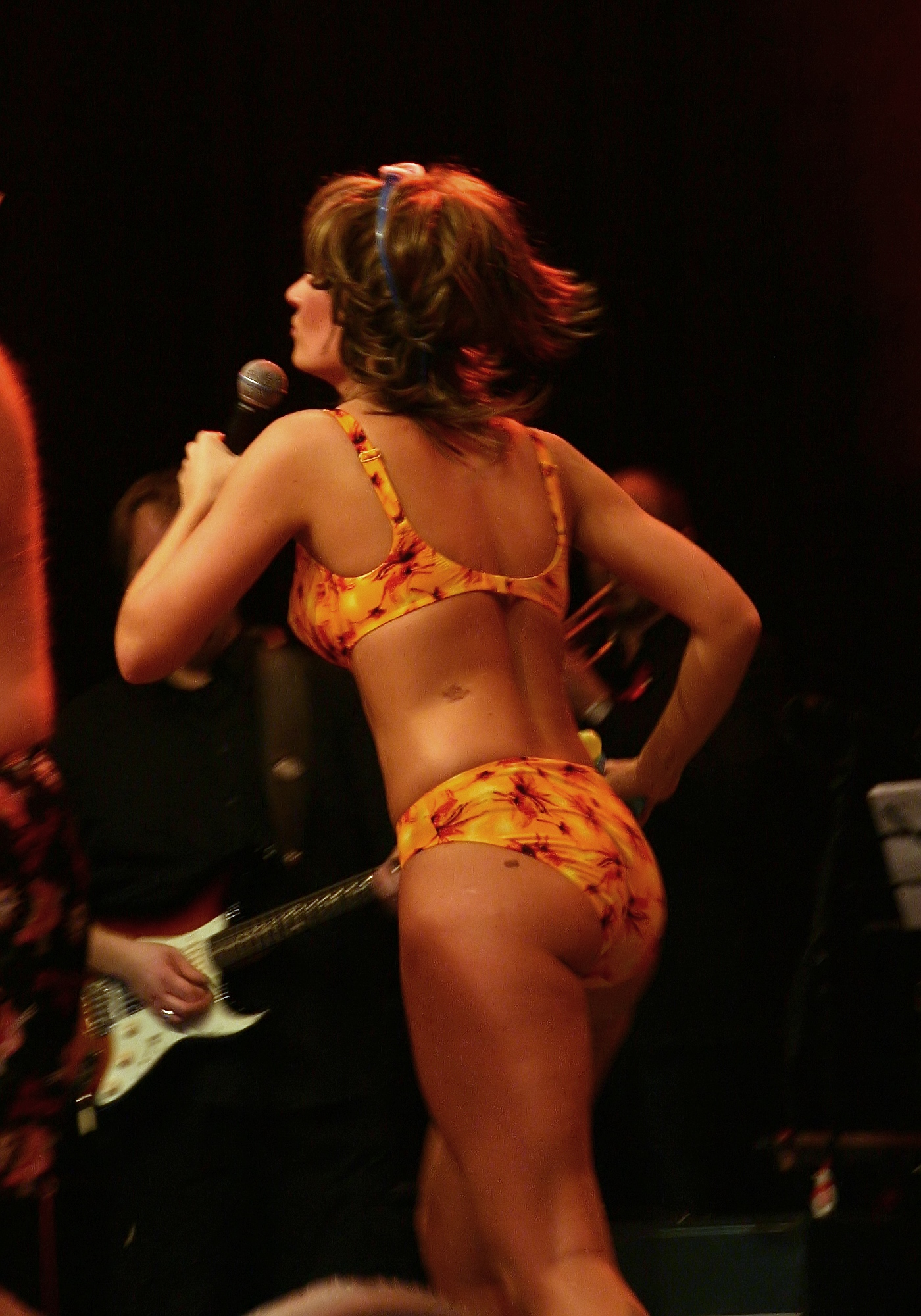
German pop singer Juliette Schoppmann at Palladium, Cologne

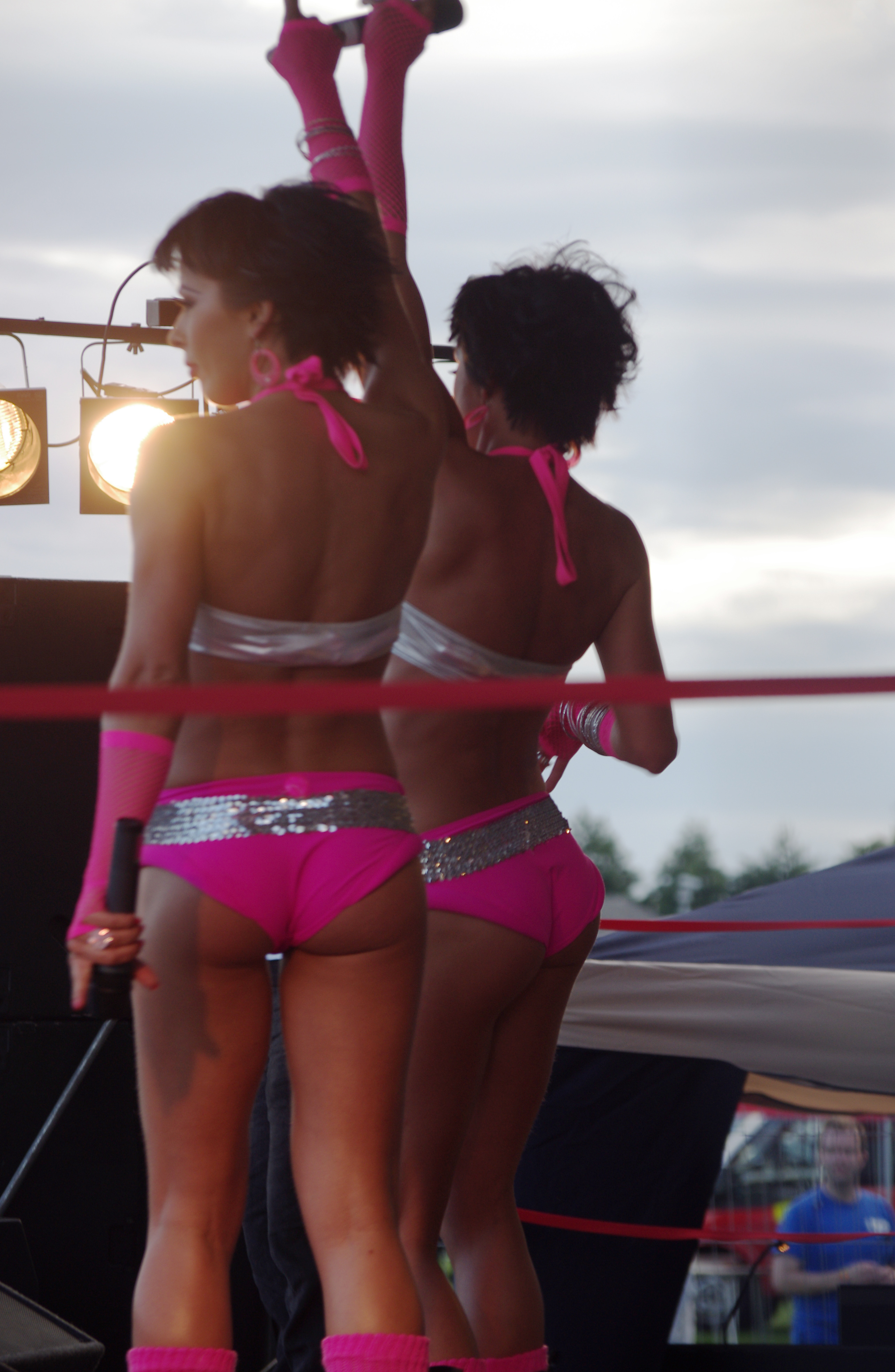
The Cheeky Girls at Nottingham Pride, Nottingham

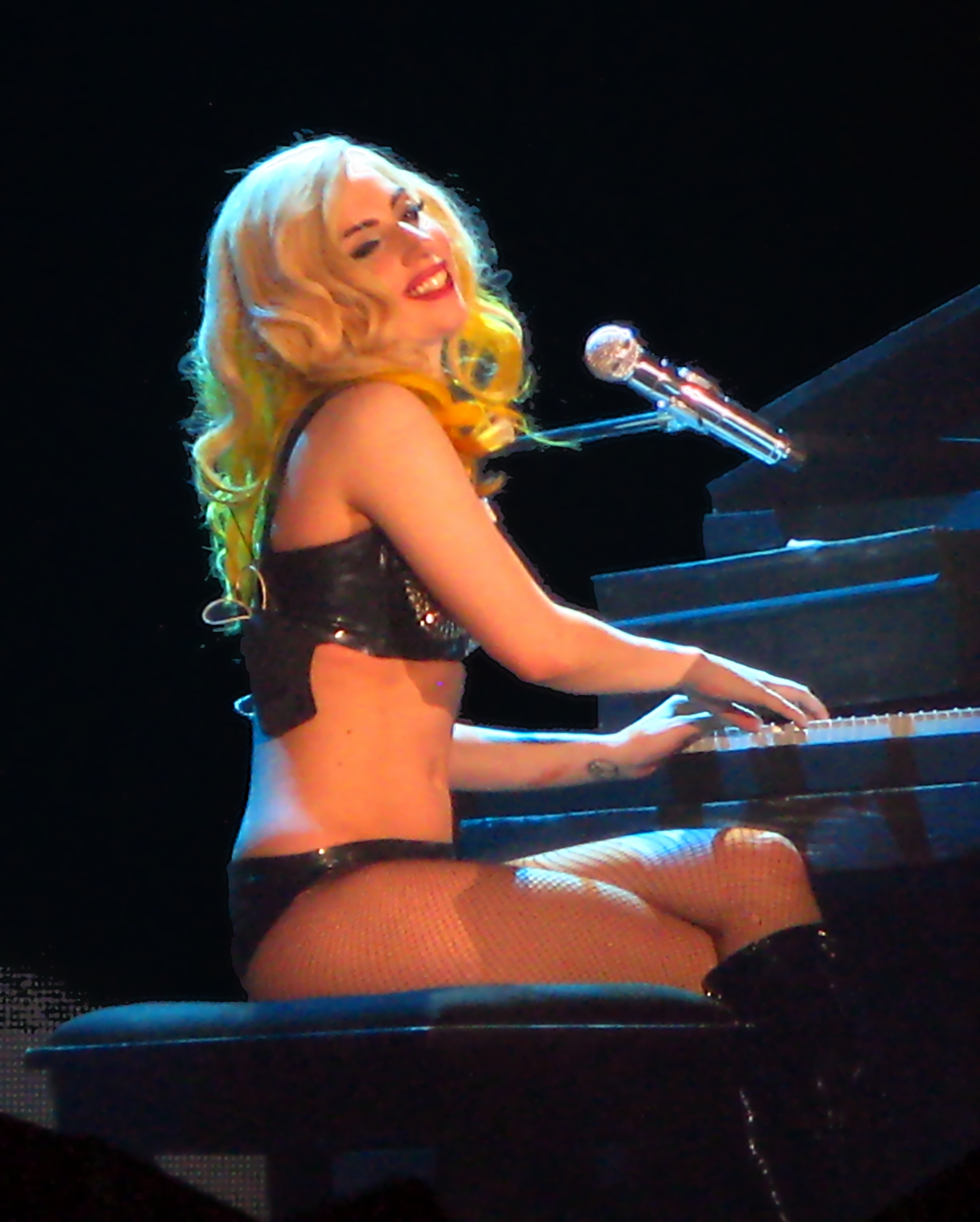
Lady Gaga at The Monster Ball Tour in Cardiff

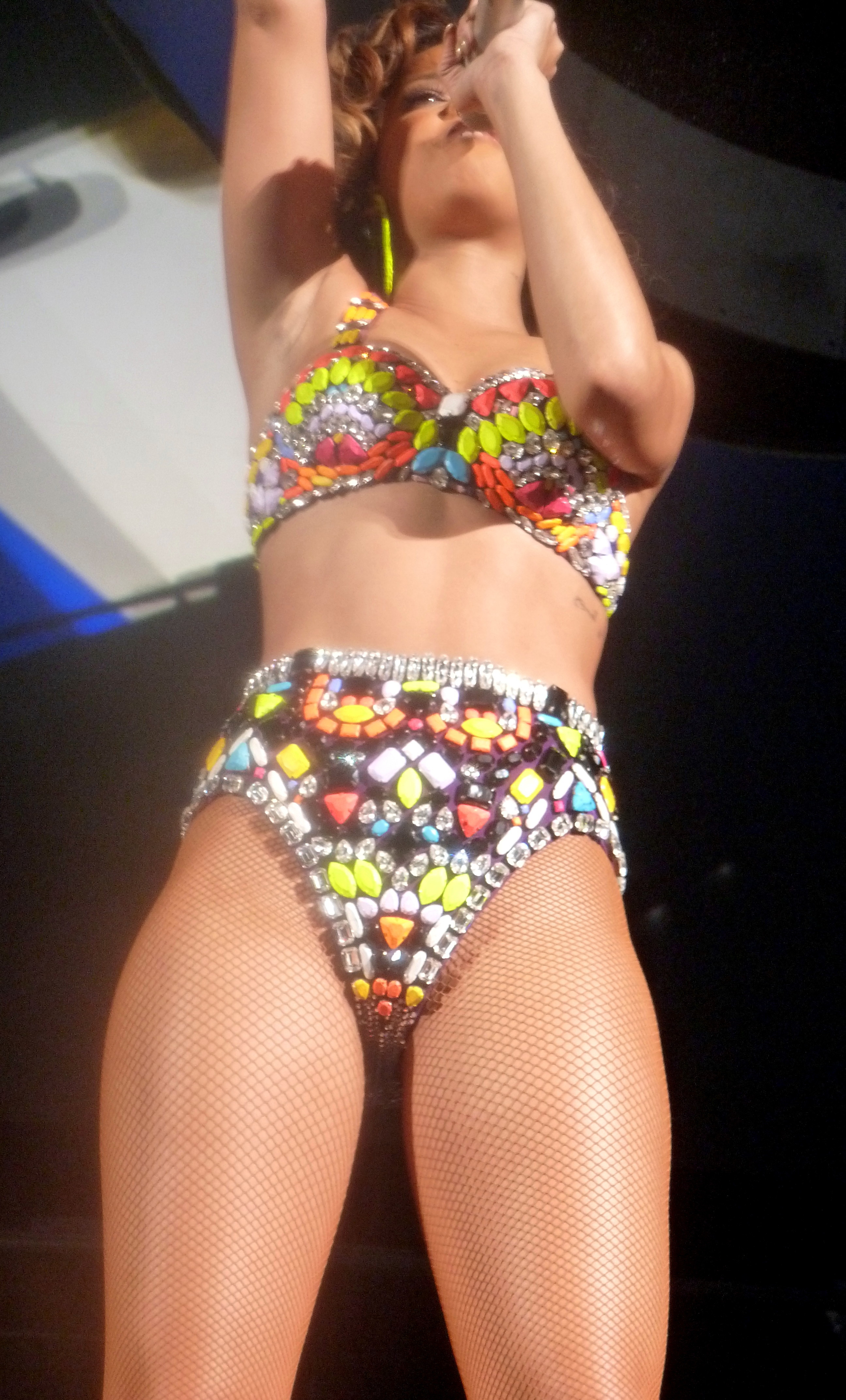
Rihanna at Loud Tour in AccorHotels Arena, Paris

=== Music videos ===
Pop stars Nicki Minaj and Rihanna donned bikinis for the music videos in 2012. Minaj wore a neon pink bikini for "Starships" and Rihanna wore a micro bikini for "Where Have You Been".

== Print media ==
=== Magazines ===
Magazine covers

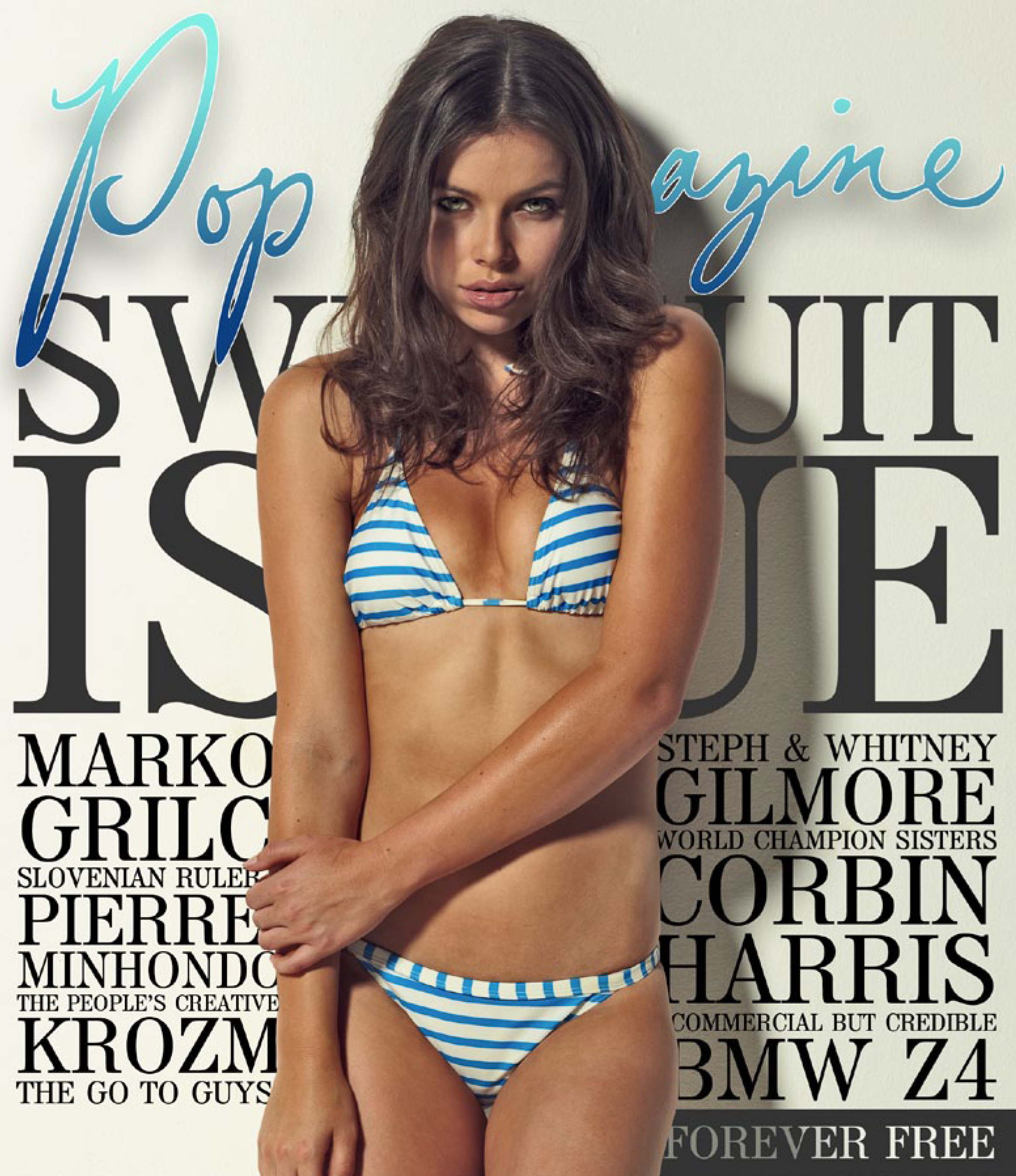
Cover of Pop magazine

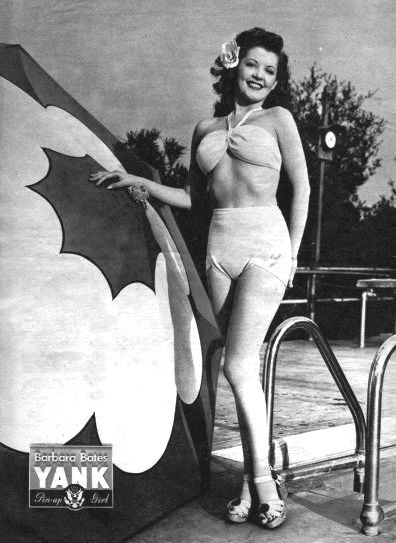
Cover of Yank, the Army Weekly

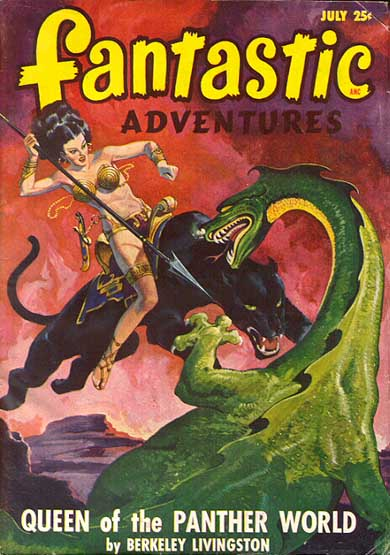
Cover of Fantastic Adventures

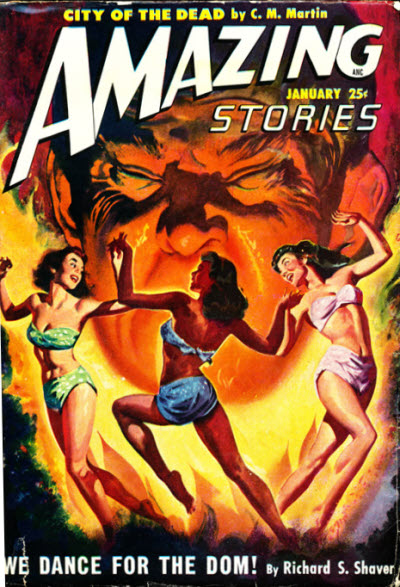
Cover of Amazing Stories

Since 1964 Sports Illustrated has published an annual swimsuit issue featuring bikini-clad fashion models on the cover and in a pictorial section. The issues have become a cultural icon. For the original Sports Illustrated Swimsuit Issue, magazine editor Andre Laguerre asked fashion reporter Jule Campbell to help find a model. She found Berlin-born fashion model Babette March and featured her on the cover, wearing a white bikini, wading in the surf on Cozumel, Mexico. The annual Swimsuit Issue features fashion models wearing swimwear in exotic locales. Inclusion is considered a standard whereby supermodels are measured. In 2005 the issue carried US$35 million in advertising.

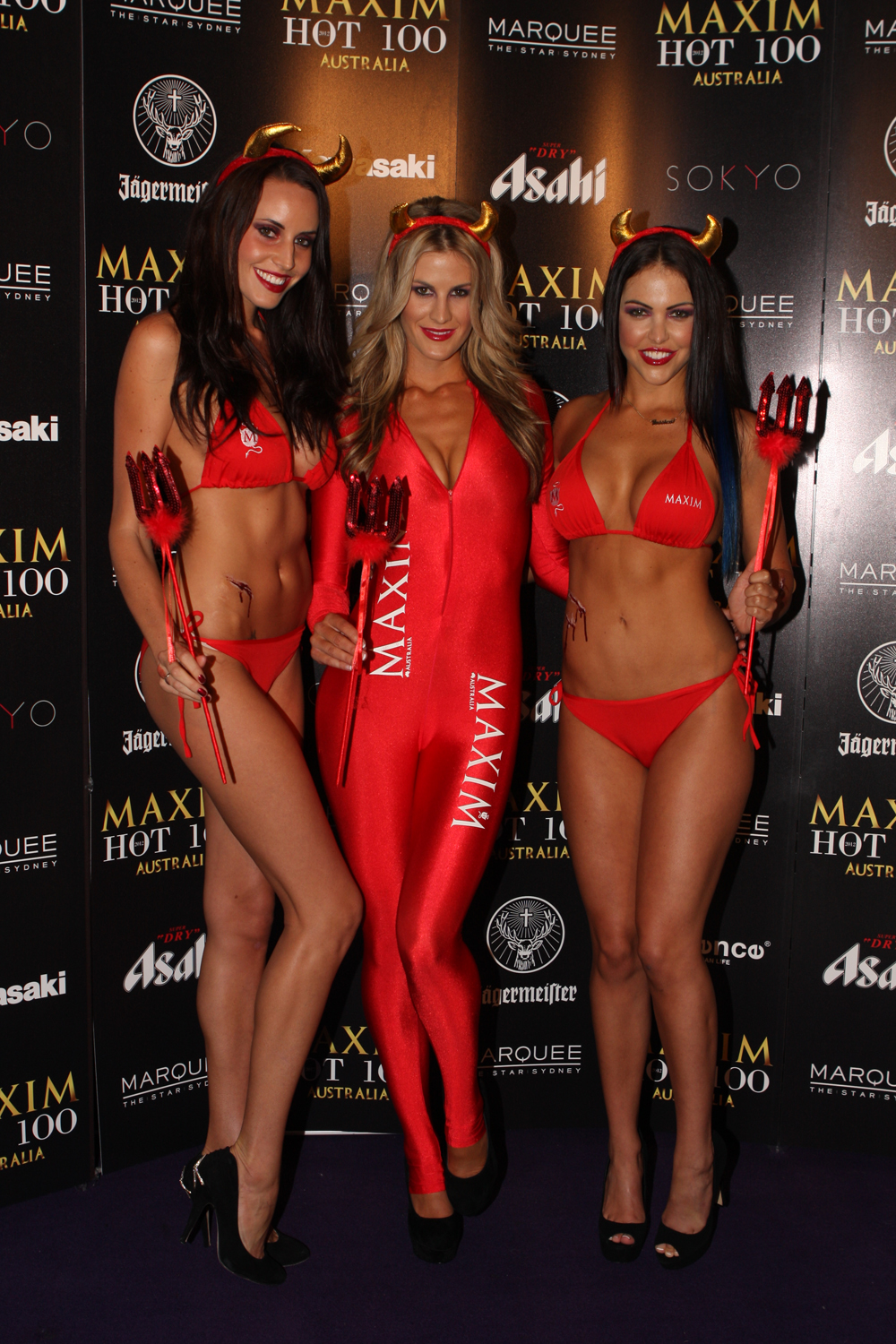
Maxim magazine's Halloween party

The Swimsuit Issue is released around the middle of February or later. It is credited with making the bikini a legitimate piece of apparel. The issue that received the greatest number of letters was the 1978 issue. The best selling issue was the 25th Anniversary Issue with Kathy Ireland on the cover in 1989. Media Watch, a feminist newsletter, reported that there were protests at the Time-Life Building. Magazines such as Sport and Ebony Man publish their own versions, while many other magazines imitate the swimsuit issue. Spin brings out a parody of the swimsuit issues.

Urbe Bikini (UB) is a Venezuelan, Maxim-style monthly magazine created in 2003 by Urbe's editor-in-chief and creative director Gabriel Torrelles and the publisher Carlos Lizarralde. Lizarralde subsequently sold the company to Cadena Capriles, the largest publisher in Venezuela. It is the largest circulation glossy magazine in the country and a cultural and circulation phenomenon. Sports magazines like Inside Sport and automotive magazines like the Lowrider Magazine regularly feature bikini-clad women on the cover to appeal to a predominantly young male audience. In 2006, Maxim magazine created a 33 metres (108 ft) wide vinyl-mesh bikini in the desert of southern Nevada, United States featuring Eva Longoria from Desperate Housewives, claiming that it could be seen from outer space.

In 2011 Lilac magazine became the first Arabic magazine to show a bikini on the cover. The 22-year-old model, Huda Naccache, from Haifa, Israel, is pictured posing in a black sequinned bikini. The Japanese magazine Young Animal (Yangu Animaru) includes color pinup photos of teenage girls in bikinis (generally pop stars and gravure idols). The editor of The SFWA Bulletin, Jean Rabe, resigned in 2013 over a controversy about sexism in a cover image of the Bulletin, which depicted a woman in a scalemail bikini.

=== Comic books ===
Comic books

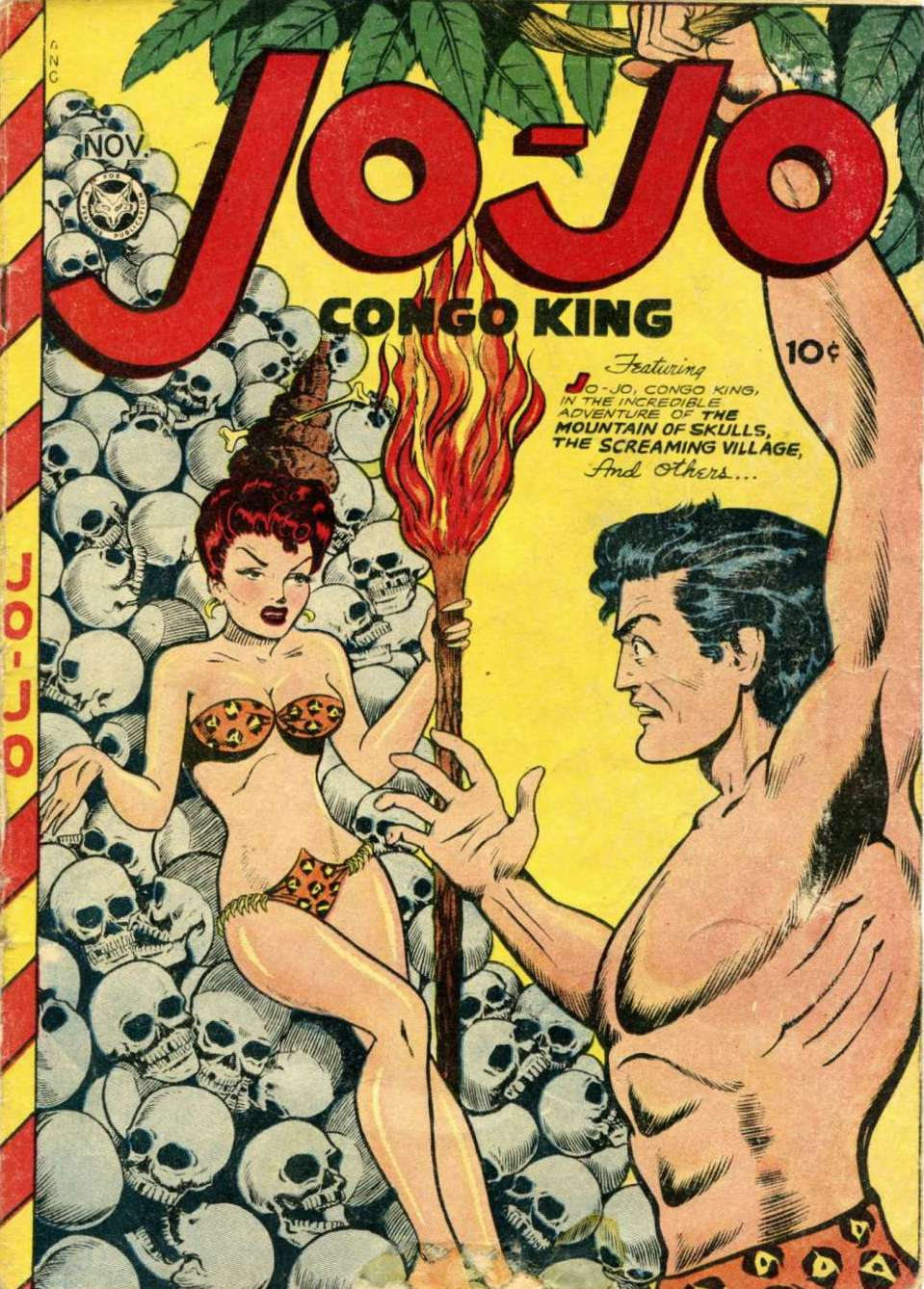
Jo-Jo, Congo King published by Fox Feature Syndicate

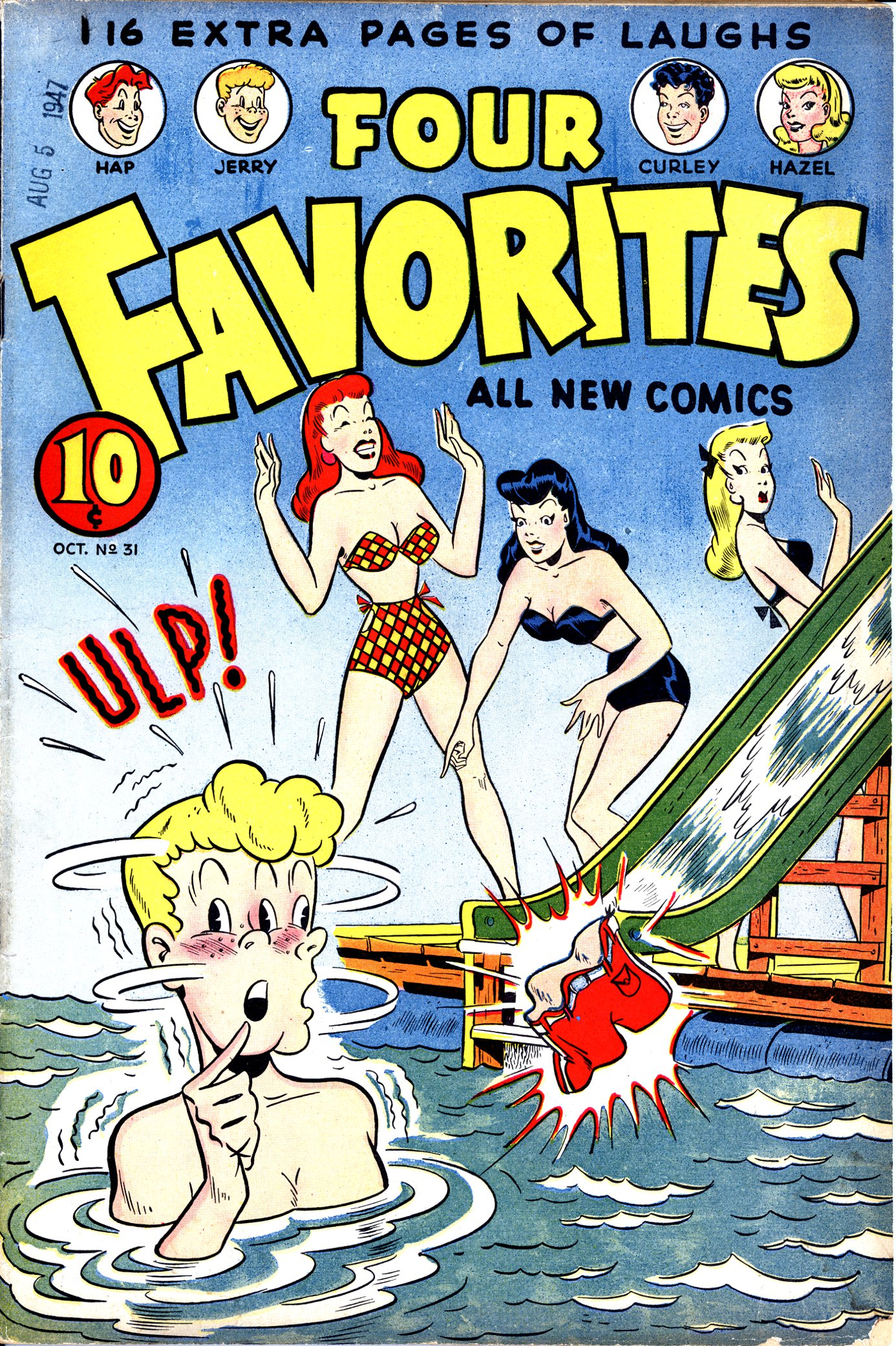
Four Favorites published by Ace Comics

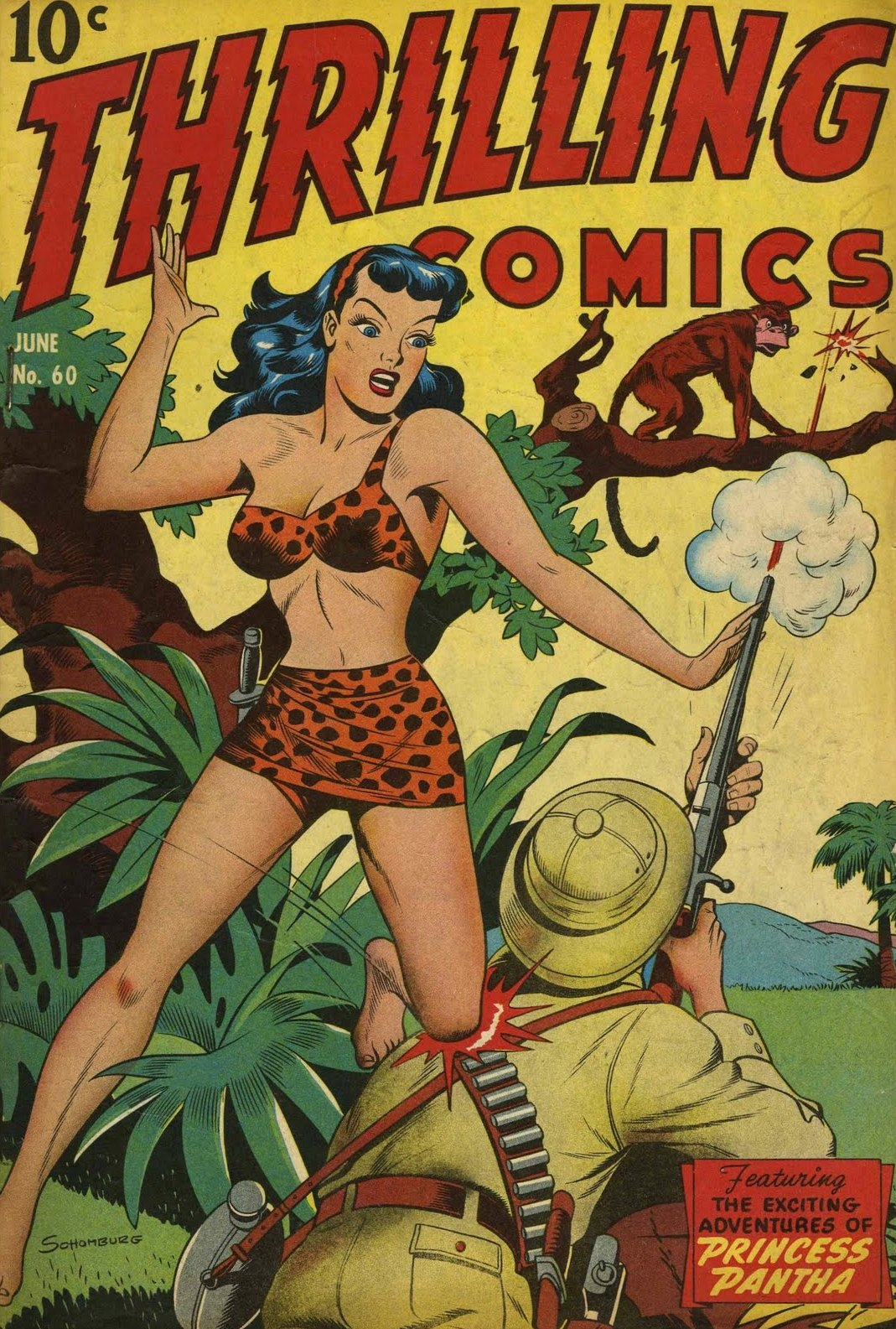
Princess Pantha published by Nedor Comics

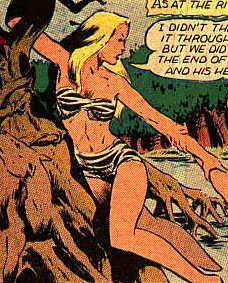
Jungle girl Camilla published by Fiction House

Most artists depict Red Sonja, a Marvel Comics character created by Roy Thomas and Barry Windsor-Smith who frequented Conan the Barbarian books and was ranked first in Comics Buyer's Guide's "100 Sexiest Women in Comics" list, wearing a very brief bikini-like costume of scale armour, usually with boots and gauntlets. Ghita, another character created by Frank Thorne after he ceased work on Marvel Comics' Red Sonja, was drawn both in and out of her armored bikini in the "adults only" graphic novel Ghita of Alizarr published by Eros Comix.

Comic book writer and artist Mike Grell designed the character Shadow Lass in the series Legion of Superheroes wearing a shiny black bikini as the costume for DC Comics. During his leadership, another Legion character Saturn Girl wore a pink bikini as her costume which she continued till 1982. Writer-artist Budd Root created Cavewoman for Basement Comics, a voluptuous barefoot jungle goddess in a snakeskin bikini.

Darna, a character created by writer Mars Ravelo and artist Nestor Redondo for Filipino comics publisher Mango Comics, consistently wore a variation of her classic costume of red bikini with a gold star in each brassiere cap. Rulah, Jungle Goddess, a comic book character created by Matt Baker for Fox Feature Syndicate, wore a bikini made from the skin of a dead giraffe. Kiani, a supporting character of Fathom, a comic book series created by artist Michael Turner for Aspen Comics is traditionally seen wearing only her bikini with barrier reef adornments.

=== Books ===
Book covers

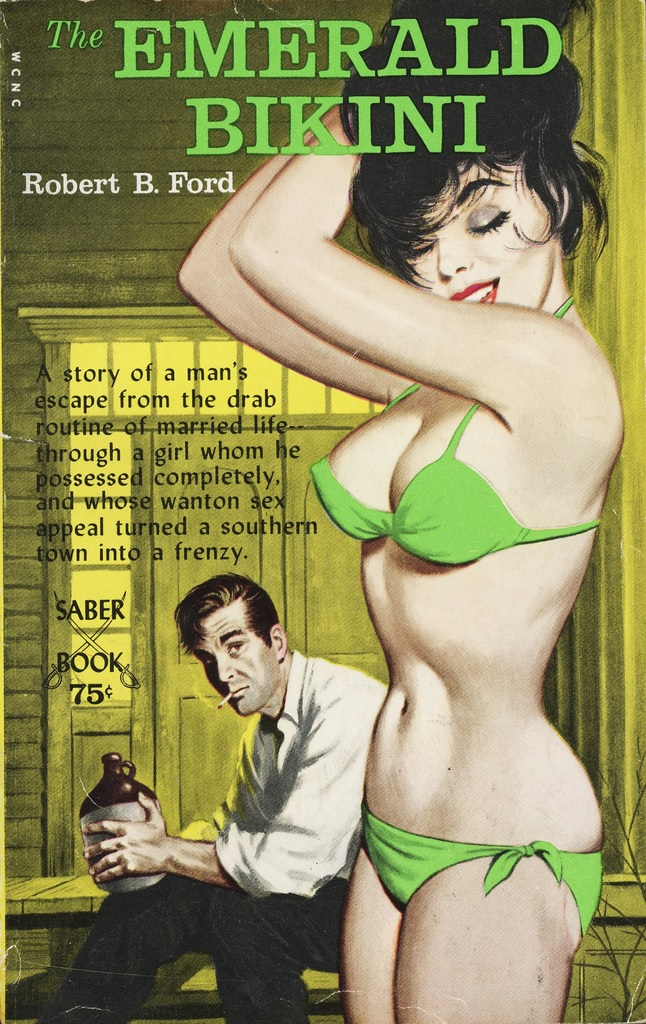
The Emerald Bikini by Robert B. Ford, illustrated by Bill Edwards

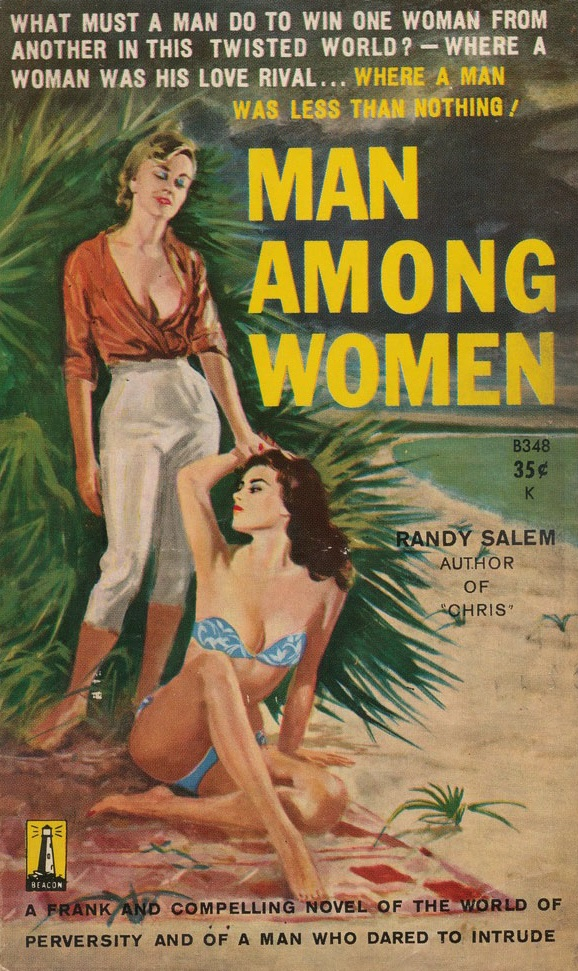
Man Among Women by Randy Salem, illustrated by Uljegren

There have been many bikini-themed non-fiction books, such as:

- The Bikini: A Cultural History by Patrik Alac
- The Bikini Book by Kelly Killoren Bensimon

Bikini body tutorials include:

- The Bikini Body Motivation & Habits Guide by Kayla Itsines
- The Bikini Body by Kayla Itsines
- The Bikini Boss Complete Transformation Program by Theresa DePasquale.

There also are fictional works, such as:

- Bikini Planet by David S. Garnett
- Bikini Season by Sheila Roberts
- When Bad Things Happen in Good Bikinis by Helen Bailey
- The Bikini Diaries by Lacey Alexander
- Ghost in the Polka Dot Bikini by Sue Ann Jaffarian
- Bikinis in Paradise by Kathi Daley
- Death by Bikini by Linda Gerber

== Art and entertainment ==
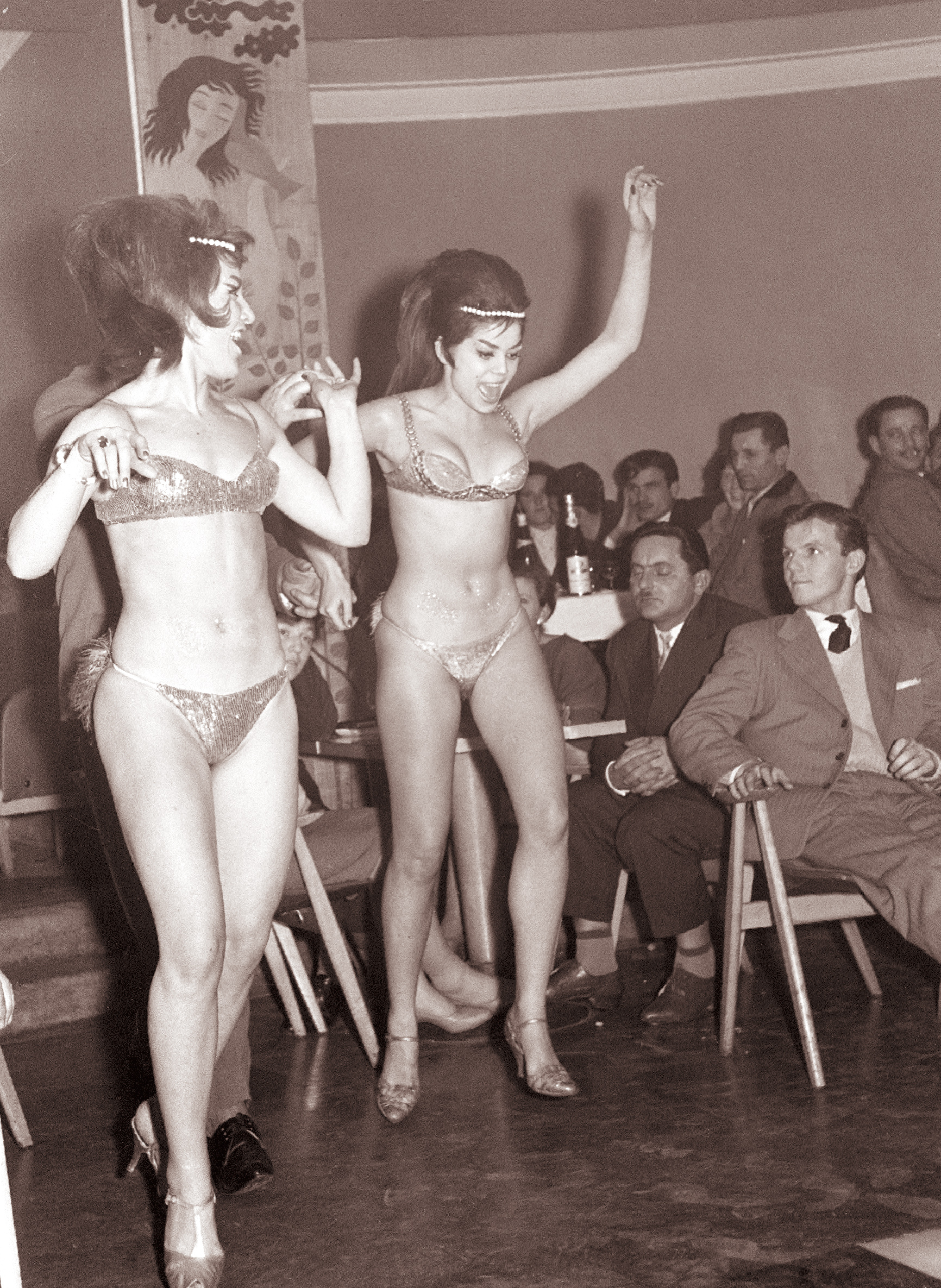
Yugoslav bikini girls and Bengali illusionist performing in Maribor, Slovenia in 1961

=== Games ===
The Bikini Karate Babes is a digitized 2D fighting game developed by Creative Edge Studios. It features an all-female cast of 19 fighters, all clad in bikinis and played by real actresses. OneChanbara: Bikini Zombie Slayers (for Wii) and Onechanbara: Bikini Samurai Squad (for Xbox 360) are two games in the Onechanbara series developed by Tamsoft, featuring ample female flesh, gore and violence. Dead or Alive Xtreme Beach Volleyball by Tecmo is a beach volleyball game featuring bikini clad women from the Dead or Alive games franchise.

=== Television ===
Bikini News was a series of satirical news videos featuring two comedians performing in bikinis in a comedic style similar to The Daily Show and Saturday Night Live, which was available as an Internet download. As of October 2007, over 90 episodes had been created. "Bikini Wax", a 2005 episode of the US police procedural television series NCIS, included an investigation into the death of a bikini contestant. Bikini Destinations, which ran between 2003 and 2011, was a US travel show that took bikini-clad anchors to places where bikinis are commonly worn. Bikini Barbershop, released in 2012, was a US reality show featuring female hair stylists at work, wearing only bikinis.

=== Theater ===
In Nissim Ezekiel's one act Indian English moral play The Song of Deprivation, the protagonist becomes a "different woman altogether" as she takes off her bikini and gets into a sari.

== Sports ==
Bikinis in sports

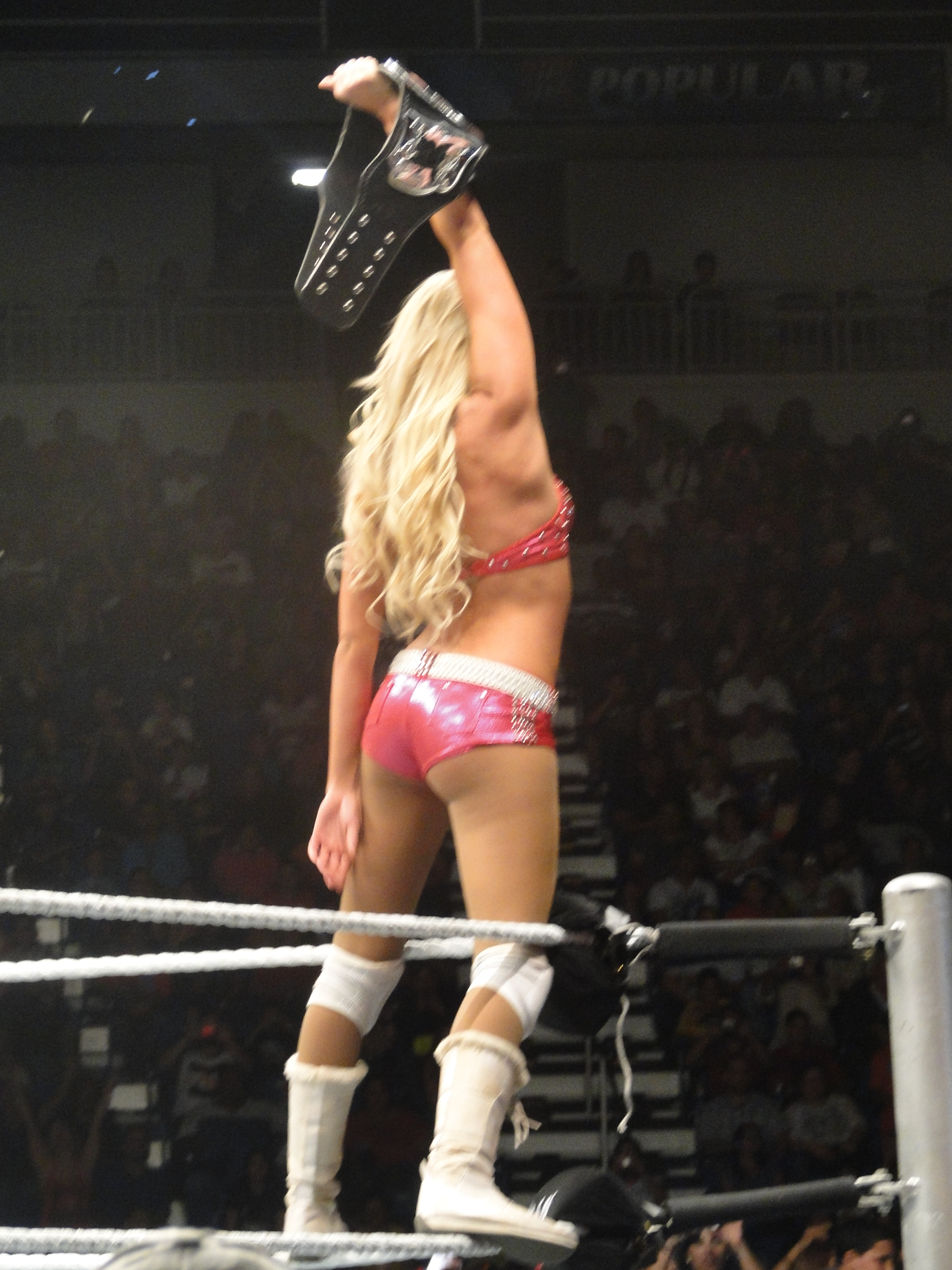
Kelly Kelly posing with WWE Divas Championship belt

In 1994, the bikini became the official uniform of women's Olympic beach volleyball. Despite controversies, bikini remains preferred by most beach volleyball players and corporate sponsors. In 2003, scanty clothing of beach volleyball helped the popularity of Dead or Alive Xtreme Beach Volleyball, a video game for Xbox and, in 2007, contestants in the WWE Diva contest. The Bikini Basketball Association is an American women's basketball league, created by Cedric Mitchell and A. J. McArthur in 2012. The players wear sports bras and boy shorts, during games. Commentators found it variously funny, offensive, and smart business.

Sports leagues set up in the United States in which female players compete wearing uniforms consisting of underwear include the Legends Football League (formerly the Lingerie Football League) and the Lingerie Basketball League. Besides all swimming events, that generally have monokini/bikini as uniform, various sports played on beach (such as beach handball, beach rugby, etc.) may also have bikini as the prescribed uniform for women.

== Modeling ==
When Jayne Mansfield and her husband Miklós Hargitay toured for stage shows, newspapers wrote that Mansfield convinced the rural population that she owned more bikinis than anyone. She showed a fair amount of her 40-inch (100 cm) bust, as well as her midriff and legs, in the leopard-spot bikini she wore for her stage shows. Kathryn Wexler of The Miami Herald wrote, "In the beginning as we know it, there was Jayne Mansfield. Here she preens in leopard-print or striped bikinis, sucking in air to showcase her well noted physical assets." Her leopard-skin bikini remains one of the earlier specimens of the fashion.

The Swedish Bikini Team was a group of American female models who appeared in an advertising campaign for Old Milwaukee beer. These commercials ran for several months in 1991 in the United States, playing with the American stereotype of blonde and big-breasted Scandinavian women. Feminist activists found the ads misogynistic. Though the campaign generated widespread interest, the advertisements were dropped after protests by the National Organization for Women and female employees of the Pabst Brewing Company. The Swedish Bikini Team featured in the 2001 film Never Say Never Mind.

=== Cosplay ===
Bikini Cosplay

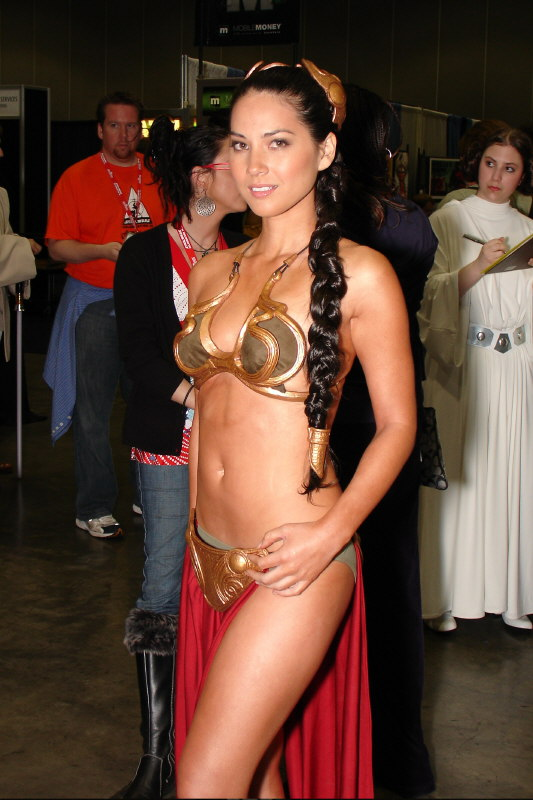
American actress Olivia Munn in Princess Leia's bikini

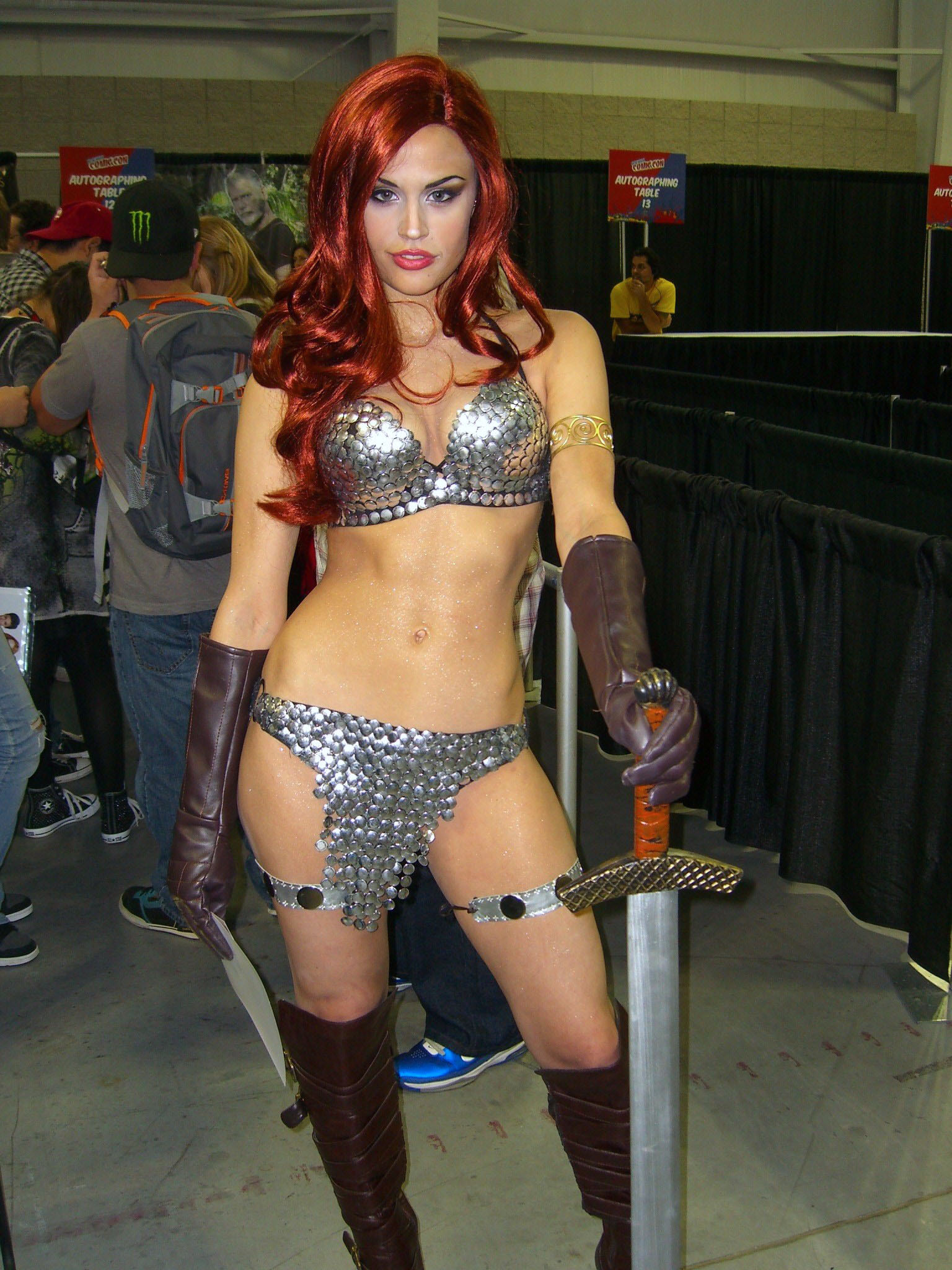
A cosplayer at 2011 New York Comic Con dressed as Red Sonja

The actress and model Phoebe Price wore a Princess Leia slave girl bikini at San Diego Comic-Con in 2010. Liana K, the Canadian co-host of Ed & Red's Night Party and well-known cosplayer appeared at 2008 Calgary Comic & Entertainment Expo dressed in Princess Leia's slave girl outfit.

The scale armour bikini of Red Sonja remains a recurring theme in cosplay and comics conventions.

== Services ==
=== Airlines ===
In February 1964, Scandinavian Airlines placed an advertisement in newspapers and magazines throughout America. It featured a bikini-clad blonde model exposing her bellybutton posing on a rock above the caption "What to show your wife in Scandinavia." The image that appeared in most publications had the belly button removed to conform to the regulations.

The Irish low-cost airline Ryanair publishes its Annual Charity Calendar featuring the Cabin crew in bikinis. In 2013 the Thai low cost airline Nok Air ran a Facebook contest featuring models from the men's magazine Maxim dressed in yellow bikinis, the brand color of the airline. The promotion was criticised by the Thai Ministry of Culture for focussing on Thailand's negative reputation. In Russia in 2010, the low cost airline Avianova created an advertising video showing the airline's stewardesses washing a plane in bikinis. The video was subsequently criticised by the Flight Attendants' Association of Australia.

In Vietnam, VietJetAir organized a bikini contest show on its inaugural flight in December 2011, and when a video of the show became popular on YouTube the airline was fined by the country's Civil Aviation Administration in August 2012 for "local aviation regulations". In 2009, Southwest Airlines of United States ran a Boeing 737 with a picture of swimsuit model Bar Refaeli wearing a bikini painted on the fuselage. In Bolivia, Colombian lingerie company Ronied ran a promotional fashion show of bikini and lingerie wearing models on board a state airline Boliviana de Aviación (BoA) plane during a commercial flight from La Paz to Cochabamba in 2010.

=== Clubs ===
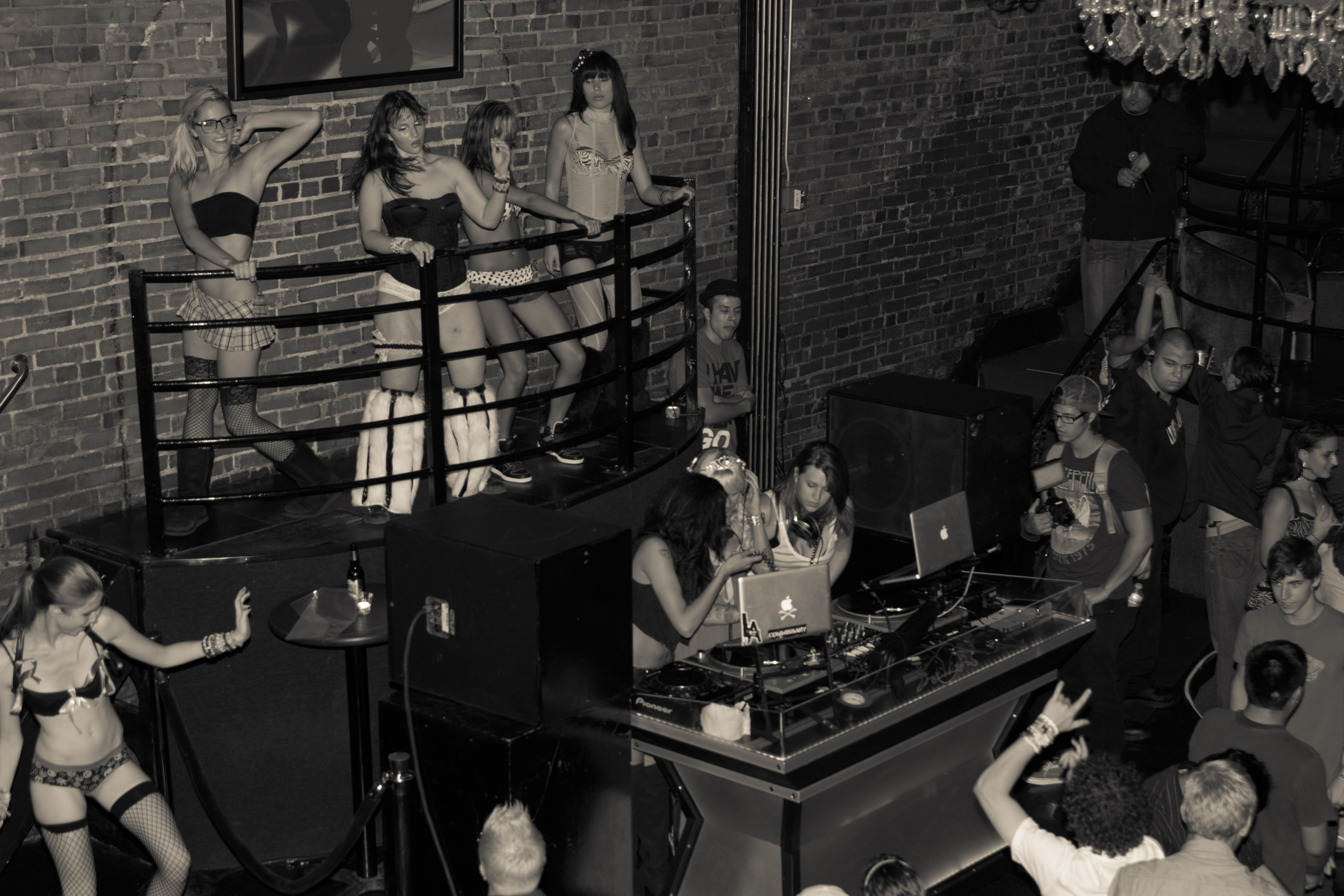
Go-go dancers at the Lizard Lounge, Dallas, Texas (2011)

Go-go dancers who perform as a dancer to fast, energetic, popular music are employed to entertain crowds in places such as bars, nightclubs and discothèques in a sexually exciting manner while wearing very little clothing, often a bikini. Go-go dancing originated in the early 1960s, by some accounts when women at the Peppermint Lounge in New York City began to get up on tables and dance the twist. Other accounts claim that go-go dancing originated at, and was named for, the very popular South L.A. rock club Whisky a Go Go which opened in January 1964. Many 1960s-era clubgoers wore miniskirts and knee-high, high-heeled boots, which eventually came to be called go-go boots, to night clubs.

On 19 June 1964 "Big" Davy Rosenberg, the publicist at the Condor Club in San Francisco, gave Carol Doda, a 26 years old go-go dancer at the club, a monokini topless swimsuit designed by Rudi Gernreich. She performed topless that night, the first noted entertainer of the era to do so. The act was an instant success. Two months after she started her semi-nude performances, the rest of San Francisco's Broadway was topless, followed soon after by entertainers across America. In 2012, the city of San Antonio amended its city ordinances dealing with "sexually oriented businesses" redefining "nudity" to include "a state of dress that fails to completely and opaquely cover...the entire female breast". Whereas female dancers had previously been able to avoid being classified as "nude" by wearing pasties over their nipples, the new law required that they wear at minimum a bra or bikini top.

Bikini bars are similar to go-go bars and striptease establishments except that the breasts and genital areas of the female performers or go-go dancers typically remain covered for the duration of their performance.

=== Bars ===
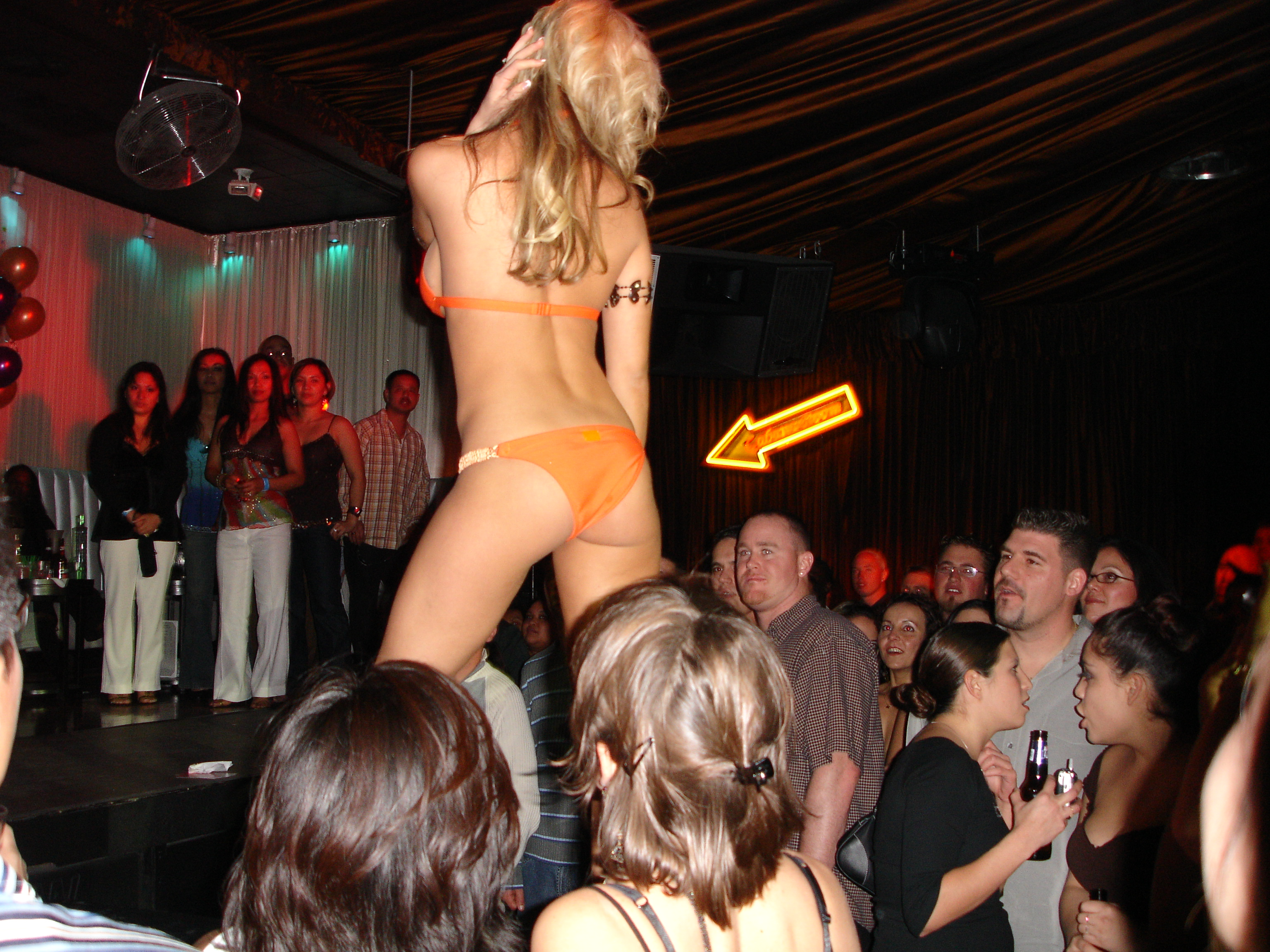
Dancer at a bikini bar in Sacramento, California

Twin Peaks, a chain of sports bars and restaurants (colloquially referred to as breastaurants) based in Dallas, Texas, is known for having its waitresses dress in revealing uniforms that consist of cleavage- and midriff-revealing red and/or black plaid bikini tops and khaki short shorts. Bikinis Sports Bar & Grill, a former chain of sports bars and restaurants primarily located in Texas, is known for its scantily clad waitresses, whose uniforms consist of bikini tops, cowboy boots, and tight, short denim shorts. The chain is also known for trademarking the term "breastaurant" and purchasing a ghost town that was subsequently renamed "Bikinis, Texas". The waitresses at the Molokai Bar of Mai-Kai Restaurant, a tiki-themed restaurant in Fort Lauderdale, Florida are attired in bikini tops and wraparound sarongs. In Sip 'n Dip Lounge, USA, female entertainers swim in a pool dressed up as mermaids (wearing bikini tops), and can be viewed through the bar's glass walls.

=== Cafes ===
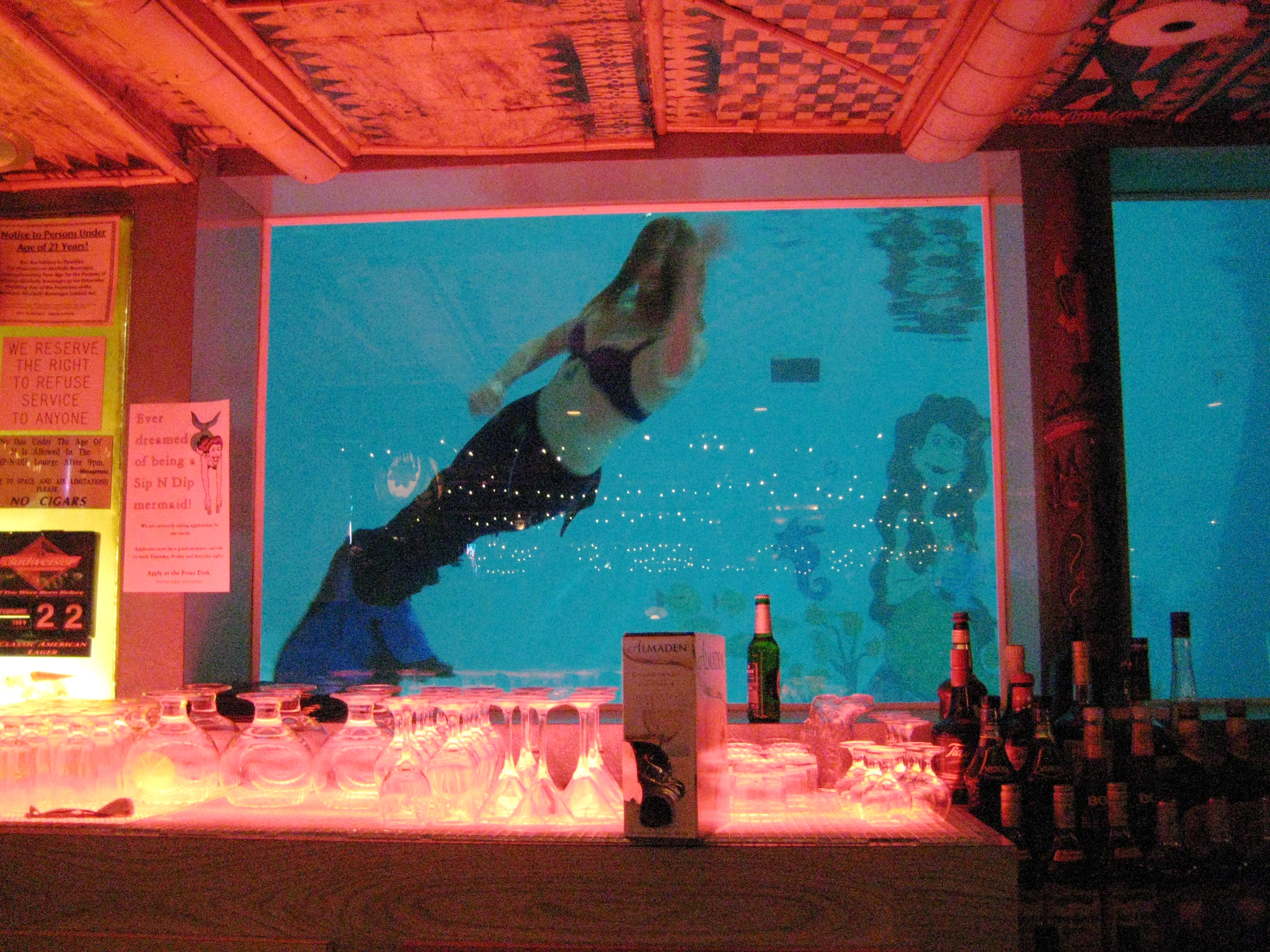
A "mermaid" (wearing bikini top) in water at the Sip 'n Dip Lounge, US

Bikini baristas prepare and serves coffee dressed in scanty attire such as a bikini or lingerie. In the United States, this marketing trend (sometimes referred to as sexpresso or bareista) originated in the Seattle, Washington area in the early 2000s. Similar phenomena have appeared in countries such as Chile and Japan since at least the 1980s. At "café con piernas" (coffee with legs) style of coffee shops popular in Chile the female service staff wears bikini, lingerie or mini skirts with high heels and often walk on a raised ramp behind the bar counter. Three well known café con piernas chains in Chile are 'Cafe do Brasil", "Cafe Caribe" and "Cafe Haiti".

Your Coffee Cups, a coffee shop based in the Warm Springs district of Fremont, California, had baristas wear bikinis. It served coffee available in "B cup" (12 oz), "C cup" (16 oz), and "D cup" (20 oz) sizes.

=== Car wash ===
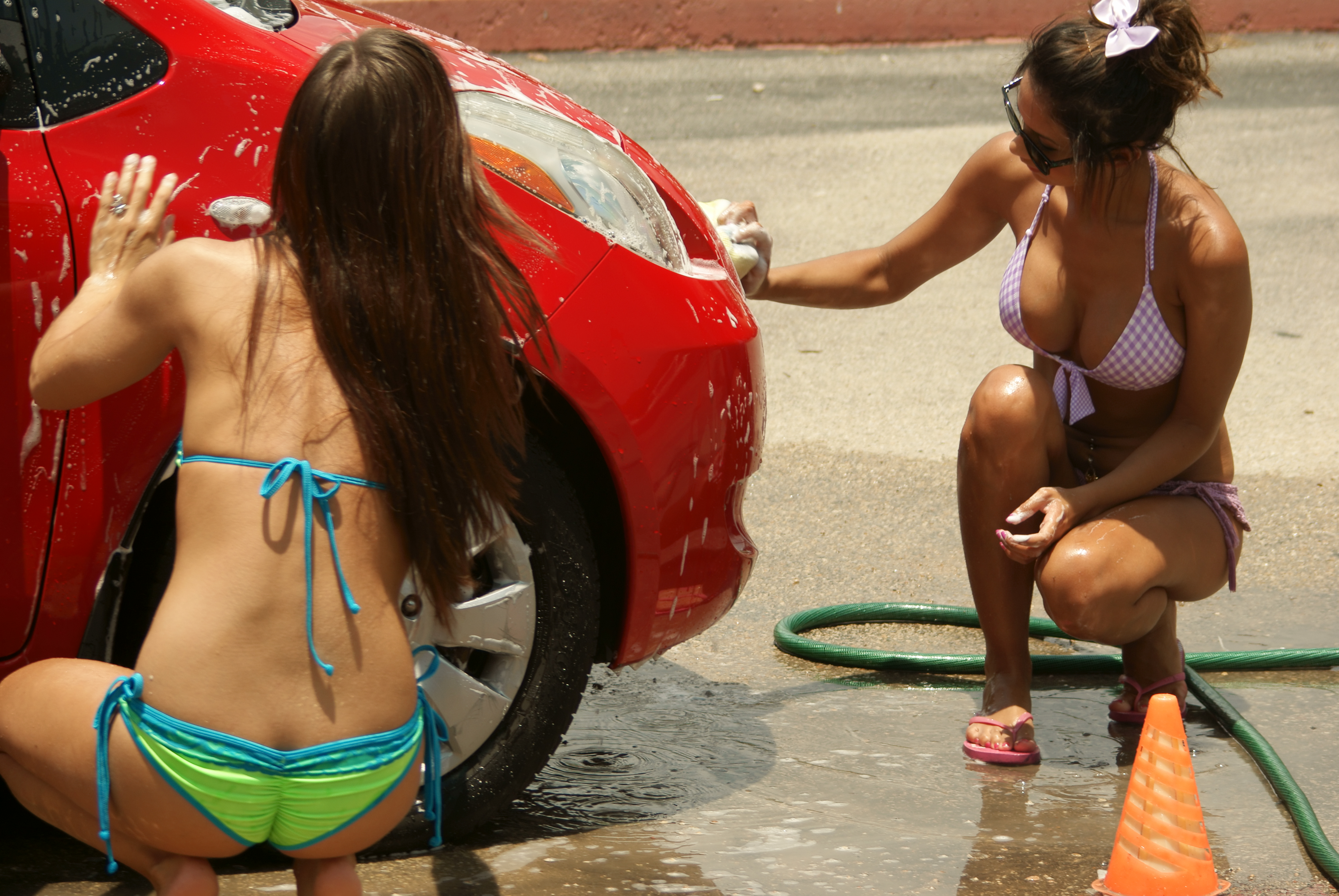
Bikini car wash at the Twin Peaks restaurant in Round Rock, Texas, in 2012

Bikini car washes are warm-weather events which serve as fund raisers for a school, sport association (such as roller derby or auto racing), youth organization or charity, or as commercial promotion. Women in bikinis promote the event by standing on a roadside with colorful cardboard signs or posters, and/or by washing the cars. Hooters restaurants have bikini car washes in the summer to attract customers. It was the theme for comedy films The Bikini Carwash Company (1992) and The Bikini Carwash Company II (1993).

== Online ==
A hoax movement started in January 2014 attempted to popularize the "bikini bridge" as a trend on social media. As an extension of the thigh gap trend, a bikini bridge consists of a bikini bottom suspended between a woman's hips, exposing a "bridge" on the pelvis. Users of the 4chan board "/b/" posted manipulated images, fake celebrity testimonials, and other content relating to bikini bridges on social networks such as Instagram, Tumblr and Twitter. After generating interest from others, they began to circulate the content on "parts of the Internet known to be biased on the subject of weight" to provoke negative reactions. The meme attracted media attention with some outlets initially reporting on it as if it were an actual trend.

National Bikini Day is celebrated every year on July 5, marking the anniversary of the invention of the bikini.

== See also ==
- Bikini variants
- History of swimwear
- History of the bikini
- Miss Bumbum – a Brazilian beauty pageant
- Underwear as outerwear

== Sources ==
- Barnes, Alan; Hearn, Marcus (2001). Kiss Kiss Bang! Bang!: the Unofficial James Bond Film Companion. Batsford Books. ISBN 978-0-7134-8182-2.
