= Phil Hall (US writer) =

American writer and film critic (born 1964)

Phil Hall (born 1964) is an American writer and film critic.

== Writing ==
Hall is a writer/editor for the online Cinema Crazed and was a contributing editor for the online magazine Film Threat and the author of several film-related books, including The Encyclopedia of Underground Movies: Films from the Fringes of Cinema (2004), Independent Film Distribution (2006), The History of Independent Cinema (2009), The Greatest Bad Movies of All Time (2013), In Search of Lost Films (2016), The Weirdest Movie Ever Made: The Patterson-Gimlin Bigfoot Film (2018), Jesus Christ Movie Star (2021) and 100 Years of Wall Street Crooks (2022). He has also written for The New York Times, New York Daily News and American Movie Classics Magazine. Hall is a member of the Online Film Critics Society.

Hall is a senior enterprise editor for Westfair Communications’ Westchester and Fairfield County Business Journal, and was an editor and research analyst for the financial site Profit Confidential. He has written for Progress in Lending and he was formerly an editor for two mortgage banking magazines, Secondary Marketing Executive and Servicing Management, and the daily MortgageOrb news site.

Hall also authored Moby Dick: The Radio Play, an audio theater adaptation of Herman Melville's Moby-Dick which was performed on the radio series Nutmeg Junction and was published as an e-book.

== Other work ==
Hall is the director of the New England Underground Film Festival, an annual event held in Connecticut. He was the director of the New Haven Underground Film Festival in 2008, and previously programmed the Light+Screen Film Festival in New York. Hall also served as a member of the Governing Committee of the Online Film Critics Society. He is also the host of the SoundCloud podcast The Online Movie Show with Phil Hall.

From 1994 to 2004, Hall was the president of Open City Communications, a New York City-based public relations agency.

== Film work ==
A 20-minute documentary short by Leszek Drozd titled A Writer Named Phil Hall featured Hall talking about his career in the media, the books he authored, and his advice for young writers who want to get published.

Hall has also appeared as an actor in a number of independently produced films, including the Bikini Bloodbath series of horror-comedies, Rudyard Kipling's Mark of the Beast and the Michael Legge comedy Monochromia.
