= BKB =

BKB may refer to:

- Bambai Ka Babu (1996 film), a 1996 Bollywood action film
- Big Knockout Boxing, a combat sport brand developed and owned by DirecTV
- Bikini Karate Babes, a 2002 video game
- BKB (airport), an Indian airport that is currently under construction
- BKB Bare Knuckle Boxing, a bare knuckle boxing promotion
- Bobbi Kristina Brown (1993–2015), American reality television personality and singer, daughter of singers Whitney Houston and Bobby Brown
- Bollywood Ka Boss, an Indian game show
- Bombai Ka Baboo, a 1960 Hindi film
- Brian Banks (American football)
- IOC sport code for basketball at the Summer Olympics
