= Moten =

Moten is a surname. Notable people with the name include:

- Aaron Moten (born 1989), American actor
- Ahmad Moten Sr. (born 2004), American football player
- Bennie Moten (1894–1935), American jazz pianist and band leader
- Benny Moten (1916–1977), American jazz bassist
- Eddie Moten (born 1981), American football player
- Eric Moten (born 1968), American football player
- Etta Moten Barnett (1901–2004), American actress and contralto vocalist
- Fred Moten (born 1962), American poet and scholar
- Lawrence Moten (1972–2025), American basketball player
- Mariyah Moten (born 1984), Pakistani model
- Patrick Moten (1957–1999), musician and songwriter
- Wendy Moten (born 1965), American singer
