= White bikini of Ursula Andress =

Bathing suit worn by Ursula Andress in the 1962 James Bond film, Dr. No

- Designer: Ursula Andress, Tessa Prendergast
- Year: 1962
- Type: White cotton bikini

The white bikini worn by Ursula Andress as Honey Ryder in the 1962 James Bond film Dr. No is widely regarded as one of the most iconic costumes in film history. Its appearance in the film became a landmark moment in the history of swimwear and contributed to the bikini's growing popularity.

The lower part of the bikini features a wide white British Army belt with brass buckles and fittings, and a scabbard on the left side to hold a large knife.

== History ==
The first bikini had been worn at a Paris fashion show in 1946, but in the 1950s, the bikini was still seen as something of a taboo.

In the corresponding scene of the source novel, the character Honeychile Rider wears only a leather belt with a scabbard, and no bikini.

Andress reported that when she arrived in Jamaica to film Dr. No, no costumes were ready. So she worked with director Terence Young and costume designer Tessa Prendergast, whom she had met while living in Rome, to create a bikini that suited her 5′6″, 36-24-36 frame. The white belted bikini was made from ivory cotton.

Andress' bikini arrived at a key moment in the history of women's fashion, coming at the "birth of the sexual revolution" in the 1960s. The scene in which she emerges from the sea has been cited among the greatest moments in film and one of its most erotic; in a 2003 UK Survey by Channel 4, it was voted number one in "the 100 Greatest Sexy Moments" of cinema. The white bikini is regarded as perhaps the most important in the history of the bikini; bikini sales rocketed after the film's release. In a survey of 1,000 women to celebrate the 60th anniversary of the bikini, Andress was voted "The Ultimate Bikini Goddess".

Andress said that she owed her career to it: "This bikini made me into a success. As a result of starring in Dr. No as the first Bond girl, I was given the freedom to take my pick of future roles and to become financially independent."

Andress put the bikini up for sale in 2001, claiming to have found it in an attic. The suit fetched £41,125. The second time it was auctioned was in November 2020. While no sale price was given, the piece was expected to fetch about £500,000.

== Homage ==
The scene has been widely emulated and parodied on screen. The bikini scene was emulated by Heather Graham in a scene from Austin Powers: The Spy Who Shagged Me. It has also been emulated by Halle Berry, who wore an orange bikini with a toolbelt in the 2002 James Bond film Die Another Day.

When Daniel Craig took over the role of James Bond in the 2006 film Casino Royale, he appeared in a similar scene, emerging from the ocean wearing a pale blue pair of swim trunks. This thirteen-second shot, focused on Bond's body rather than that of a Bond Girl, was widely interpreted as a callback to Andress in Dr. No and featured heavily in the film's promotion, although Craig claims the resemblance did not occur to him until it was filmed.

In the episode "Bond", from the BBC Radio detective drama Trueman and Riley, the bikini is the prize possession of a collector and dealer in James Bond memorabilia at a hotel hosting a Bond convention, where another valuable item, the wedding ring from the film On Her Majesty's Secret Service, has apparently been stolen.

== See also ==
- Bikini in popular culture
- Fur bikini of Raquel Welch
