= Carl Toms =

British designer (1927–1999)

- Born: 29 May 1927; Nottinghamshire, England
- Died: 4 August 1999 (aged 72); Hertfordshire, England
- Education: Royal College of Art
- Known for: Scenic design
- Awards: Tony Award; Drama Desk Award for Outstanding Set Design
- Military career
- Allegiance: United Kingdom
- Branch: British Army
- Unit: Royal Army Ordnance Corps

Carl Toms OBE (29 May 1927 – 4 August 1999) was a British set and costume designer who was known for his work in theatre, opera, ballet, and film.

== Education ==
Carl Toms was born in 1927 at Kirkby-in-Ashfield, Nottinghamshire, England. His parents were both tailors and neither of them entirely approved of Toms's choice to work in the theatre, preferring that he become an architect. Even after he had made his name in the theatre, his mother would still ask when he intended to get "proper" employment. As a teenager, Toms first studied at the Mansfield College of Art in Mansfield where he met and befriended Alan Tagg, who would also become a notable stage designer. They were both greatly influenced by a young teacher from Yorkshire, Hazel Hemsworth.

Toms left Mansfield in the early 1940s to serve in the Royal Army Ordnance Corps during World War II. After the war, he went to the Royal College of Art where he studied with Cecil Beaton among others. Toms left the Royal College of Art to train under Margaret Harris, George Devine and Michel Saint-Denis at the Old Vic School in the late 1940s. It was Harris, however, who influenced the next major course of his life by introducing Toms to Oliver Messel with whom he would eventually apprentice with from 1952 to 1957.

Toms's first job under Messel was to make models for a penthouse suite at the Dorchester Hotel. At the same time Messel was working on a new ballet for the Royal Opera House commissioned to mark the coronation of Queen Elizabeth II, and three successive operas at Glyndebourne Festival, all of which Toms assisted on. Messel had a strong interest and passion for French culture which highly influenced his work. As a result, Toms's work became highly influenced by French designers, painters, and musicians as well. Many of the masks and models Toms made during this period are now on display at the Theatre Museum in Covent Garden which display this influence.

== Career ==
After leaving Messel in 1958, Toms worked on the opera Susanna's Secret for the Glyndebourne Festival and for various West End theatre productions. In 1960 he designed the world premiere of Benjamin Britten's opera A Midsummer Night's Dream at the Aldeburgh Festival. He then worked with many English non-profit companies, including the Old Vic and the National Theatre, where he designed sets and costumes for Shakespeare's Love's Labour's Lost, Marlowe's Edward II, Neil Simon's Brighton Beach Memoirs, and The Provok'd Wife for which Toms won the Laurence Olivier Award for Best Set Design. He also worked with the Royal Shakespeare Company, where he designed the 1989 production of the Kaufman-Hart comedy The Man Who Came to Dinner and John Osborne's A Patriot for Me. Toms also worked frequently with the English Stage Company.

In 1969, Toms was appointed consultant for the Investiture of the Prince of Wales, for which he received the Order of the British Empire. There followed commissions to redecorate several West End theatres including the Theatre Royal, Windsor, and, most notably, the Theatre Royal, Bath, which he restored to its former glory in 1982. In 1990 he took on the task of restoring the Richmond Theatre in Richmond, London, which had been designed by Frank Matcham.

In 1970, Toms began to work in the American theatre and won a Tony Award and the Drama Desk Award for Outstanding Set Design in 1975 for his production design of Sherlock Holmes. During this time, Toms met and befriended Tom Stoppard with whom he would work frequently on plays in both New York and London productions. Toms worked with Stoppard on such plays as Travesties, Night and Day, The Real Thing, Jumpers, and Hapgood among others. Toms's more recent design works included productions of two Edward Albee plays, Three Tall Women (1994) and A Delicate Balance (1997), and the Peter Hall production of An Ideal Husband (1996).

Toms also worked on nine films during his career, including the cult classic One Million Years B.C., starring Raquel Welch in a fur bikini of Toms's devising; and other cave epics, including Prehistoric Women (1967) and When Dinosaurs Ruled the Earth (1970). He also was the production designer for a 1968 film of The Winter's Tale.

== Death ==
Toms died of emphysema on 4 August 1999 in Hertfordshire, England, aged 72.
