= The History of Independent Cinema =

2009 book by Phil Hall

- Author: Phil Hall (US writer)
- Language: English
- Genre: Non-fiction
- Publisher: BearManor Media
- Publication date: 2009
- Publication place: United States
- Media type: Print (Softcover)
- Pages: 320
- ISBN: 1-59393-335-5
- OCLC: 436305695

The History of Independent Cinema is a 2009 book by film historian Phil Hall.

== Summary ==
It traces the development of the United States independent film sector from silent films to digital media. The book also focuses on independent film genres including documentary films, race films, Yiddish-language films and corporate sponsored films.

== Publication history ==
The book was published in by BearManor Media.

== See also ==
- L.A. Rebellion-covered in the book
- John Cassavetes-covered in the book
- Midnight movie
- B movie
- Sundance Film Festival
