= Bikinisesongen =

- Directed by: Runar Jarle Wiik
- Written by: Morten Barth
- Starring: Thor-Ivar Forsland; Eduardo Verdu
- Release date: 23 September 1994
- Running time: 97 minutes
- Country: Norway
- Language: Norwegian

Bikinisesongen (Norwegian: The bikini season) is a 1994 Norwegian comedy film directed by Runar Jarle Wiik, starring Thor-Ivar Forsland and Eduardo Verdu. The film features the friends Snorre (Verdu) and Leo (Forsland), two boys who dream of making quick money, without much success. They buy a truckload of bikinis and head to Western Norway to make sales, ignoring that it is already late autumn.
