= Fur bikini of Raquel Welch =

Costume from the film One Million Years B.C.

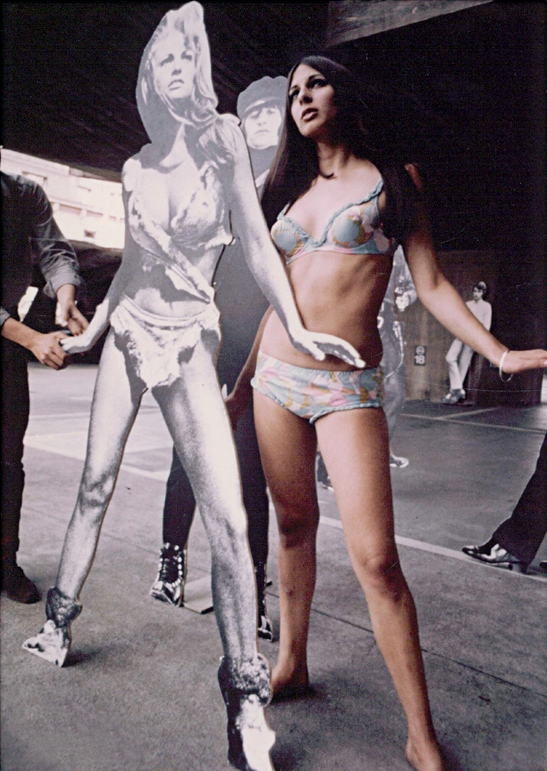
- Publicity featuring Raquel Welch's fur bikini in One Million Years B.C. , 1969
- Designer: Carl Toms
- Year: 1966
- Type: Bikini/film costume
- Material: Doe-skin/fur

A fur/hide bikini was worn by Raquel Welch in the 1966 British-made prehistoric saga One Million Years B.C. In that bikini, she was described as "wearing mankind's first bikini" and the fur bikini was described as a "definitive look of the 1960s".

== Publicity ==
A publicity still of her in the bikini became a best-selling poster and turned her into an instant pin-up girl. The bikini raised Welch's stature as a leading sex symbol of the era, and the photograph became something of a cultural phenomenon as a best-selling pinup picture. The iconic pose of Welch was taken by the unit still photographer as Welch recalled in a 2012 interview. It was used by artist Tom Chantrell to create the film poster promoting the theatrical release of One Million Years B.C., on which Welch in her fur bikini is accompanied by the film's title in bold red lettering across a landscape populated with dinosaurs. Publicity photos of Welch in the fur bikini became the biggest pin-up sensation since Betty Grable's famous pin-up photo taken by Frank Powolny in 1943, which received 50,000 requests a month from World War II US soldiers. One of her publicity photos in the fur bikini had her hanging from a crucifix. The photo taken by Terry O'Neill was deemed too scandalous and was suppressed, until it was published thirty years later by The Sunday Times Magazine.

== Production ==
Hammer originally offered the role of Loana Shell, Welch's character, to Ursula Andress, who four years earlier became a sensation rising out of the sea in a white bikini in Dr. No, the first Bond movie. When Andress passed on the project due to commitments and salary demands, a search for a replacement resulted in the selection of Welch. Welch, who had finished doing Fantastic Voyage under a contract with 20th Century Fox and was touted as America's Ursula Andress, was loaned out to Hammer Studios in Britain. In a 2012 interview she said she did not want to wear the fur bikini. She believed it to be a "fate worse than death". She declined an offer of $500,000 ($4.83 million in 2025) to take part in a sequel to the film.

The bikini was designed by Carl Toms, an award-winning theatre costume designer (Tony Award, 1975) who also designed for nine mostly Hammer films. She said, "Carl just draped me in doe-skin, and I stood there while he worked on it with scissors." She stated in another interview in 2012 that three form-fitting bikinis were made for her, including two for a wet scene and a fight scene. Created as kind of stone-age designer bikini, it was an artfully cut fur bikini with shoulder straps. The furry part of the skin is on the inside, like a lining, and provides elegance to the edges. The fur was sometimes touted as lion fur. Toms recalled, "For One Million Years B.C. I designed a fur bikini for Raquel Welch. She had such a perfect body that I took a very soft doe skin, we stretched it on her and tied it together with thongs." The Loana character also wore well groomed hair, waxed armpits and ankle high go-go styled boots. In the 1940 version of the film, Carole Landis had worn a soft-leather version of a one-piece swimsuit in the film with similar carefully cut "random" edges as Loana.

== Reception ==
The New York Times hailed her in its review of the film (which was released in the U.K. in 1966 and in the U.S. in 1967), "A marvelous breathing monument to womankind." One author said, "Although she had only three lines in the film, her luscious figure in a fur bikini made her a star and the dream girl of millions of young moviegoers". The European audience was delighted, leading to her being featured that year on the covers of more than 90 European magazines. In 2011, Time listed Welch's B.C. bikini in the "Top Ten Bikinis in Pop Culture". The fur bikini was voted the most iconic bikini, followed by the white bikini Ursula Andress wore in the film Dr. No in a poll conducted by Swimwear365 among 2,000 women.

== Legacy ==
According to Filmfacts, Million Years gave rise to "the familiar quota of buxom starlets about to pop out of their animal skin bikinis, an awful lot of bleached hair" in films with a prehistoric setting. The bikini was altered for Celeste Yarnall to be re-used in Eve (1968). Hammer Studios tried to re-emulate the fur bikini in Slave Girls (1967) with Welch's Million Years co-star Martine Beswick, When Dinosaurs Ruled the Earth (1970) with Victoria Vetri, and Creatures the World Forgot (1971) with Julie Ege. But, the Raquel Welch fur bikini remained Hammer's biggest success. Toms was the costume designer for Slave Girls and When Dinosaurs along with Million Years. In 1970, a spoof of the bikini, worn by Valerie Leon, featured in the parody film Carry On Up the Jungle.

The fur ensemble worn by Destiny's Child in the music video Survivor was inspired by Welch's fur bikini. Barbara Bach's fur bikini in Caveman (1981) was a more revealing version of Welch's bikini.

The iconic publicity poster was a story element in the film The Shawshank Redemption.
