= Honey Ryder =

Female character in the James Bond novel and film Dr. No

Honey Ryder (film) Honeychile Rider (novel)
- James Bond character
- Ursula Andress as Honey Ryder in Dr. No (1962)
- First appearance: Dr. No (novel, 1958)
- Last appearance: Dr. No (film, 1962)
- Created by: Ian Fleming
- Portrayed by: Ursula Andress
- Voiced by: Nikki van der Zyl

In-universe information
- Gender: Female
- Occupation: Shell diver
- Classification: Bond girl
- Notable outfit: White bikini

Honeychile Rider is a fictional character in Ian Fleming's James Bond novel Dr. No. In the 1962 Bond film of the same title, her name was shortened and spelled Honey Ryder. In the film, she is played by Swiss actress Ursula Andress, with her lines dubbed by Nikki van der Zyl due to Andress's heavy accent.

In the film series, Ryder is generally regarded as the first Bond girl, although she was not the first woman in the film to be with James Bond (Sean Connery). That distinction belongs to Sylvia Trench (Eunice Gayson), while Miss Taro (Zena Marshall) was Bond's first mission-related "conquest". Ryder's first appearance, emerging from the ocean in a white bikini holding two large seashells, the sun shining on her wet blonde hair, is considered a classic James Bond scene, establishing both the character and Andress as a sex symbol. The bikini is a movie wardrobe creation: the corresponding scene of the novel, Dr. No, has Honeychile Rider emerging from the Caribbean wearing just her knife belt.

Andress referred to the Dr. No bikini as the "secret of her success".

== Novel ==
In the novel Dr. No, Honeychile Rider is a Jamaican shell diver, descended from an old-established colonial family. She was orphaned at the age of five when her parents' house was burnt down. She then lived with her Black nanny in a cellar until she was 15, when her nanny died. Rider reveals that she was raped as a young girl by Mander, the overseer of the property on which she lives. She later avenged her rape by killing Mander with a black widow spider.

Rider is an independent and very beautiful woman, with the minor imperfection of a broken nose, a lasting memory of Mander's punches to subdue her before sexually assaulting her. She became a shell diver near Crab Key to earn enough money from selling the shells to American collectors, so that she can have plastic surgery on her nose. While on Crab Key, she meets James Bond and confides in him her dream of becoming a call girl in New York City in order to live a good lifestyle. Bond gently dissuades her, citing how sordid prostitution is. Rider and Bond are later captured by Dr. Julius No, who attempts to kill Rider by tying her to some rocks and allowing crabs to eat her alive. However, she is aware that the crabs dislike human flesh and they will not attack her.

She escapes, meets up with a badly injured Bond and, after Bond kills Dr. No's three hired assassins, they steal his armored dune buggy and escape to Bond's hidden canoe. Rider then single-handedly sails them back to Jamaica while Bond lies unconscious in the bottom of the canoe. She then tends his wounds until he can get to a hospital the next day. It is implied in the book that she and Bond will later travel to New York City where Rider will get her nose fixed; and that on her return, she will work at the Jamaican natural history museum. Before they part, Bond and Rider have dinner at her home, and the couple share a romantic night together before Bond leaves Jamaica.

In later novels, Bond reflects on how Rider moved to Philadelphia, where she married a doctor by the name of Wilder and had two children with him.

== Film ==
Honey Ryder (Ursula Andress) is a beachcomber making a living selling seashells in Miami. As in the novel, she is a very independent woman claiming to not need help from anyone. Resourceful and courageous, Ryder states that she can defend herself against any hostile when she first meets James Bond (Sean Connery). Although she is at first wary of Bond, he is allowed to get closer when he comments that his intentions are honourable.

Like Pussy Galore (Honor Blackman) in Goldfinger, Ryder does not appear until halfway through the film. She comes out of the ocean singing "Under the Mango Tree", Bond startles her when he joins in singing. She pulls her dagger out, wary of Bond's position but grows to trust him. Ryder shows Quarrel (John Kitzmiller) and Bond a secret way to escape Dr. Julius No (Joseph Wiseman)'s men, while being chased. After they evade No's men, she tells Bond how her father died when on Crab Key, and that she was raped by a local landlord. Ryder relates how she got her revenge by putting a black widow spider in his mosquito net and causing his lingering death. When in a marshy region of the island, Quarrel, Bond and Ryder have a close encounter with No's "dragon". Quarrel dies and the remaining two get captured. No's men wash away radiation that Honey and Bond got on their clothes and they get rooms of luxury. The next day, they meet Doctor No. When in conversation, No has Ryder taken away. After Bond kills No, he saves her from the island and they have sex in a towed boat.

Christine Bold argues that the film character is "much less resourceful" than in the book: "whereas, in the novel, her superior knowledge of sea life facilitates her escape from Dr No's trap, in the movie she is chained down helplessly and must be rescued by Bond."

== Reception and legacy ==
In a UK survey conducted in 2003 by Channel 4, Honey Ryder's entrance in the movie Dr. No was voted number one in "the 100 Greatest Sexy Moments" (BBC 2003). Ursula Andress as Honey Ryder was voted the best Bond Girl by Entertainment Weekly.

Author Anthony Horowitz gave his James Bond tribute character Alex Rider the same surname as Honeychile Rider.

Halle Berry performed a similar scene in the 20th James Bond film, Die Another Day (2002); where her character Giacinta "Jinx" Johnson emerges from the ocean in an orange bikini. James Bond himself (played by Daniel Craig) did the same in the 2006 Casino Royale film, wearing blue trunks.

== See also ==
- White bikini of Ursula Andress
