= Bikini bridge =

Beauty fad

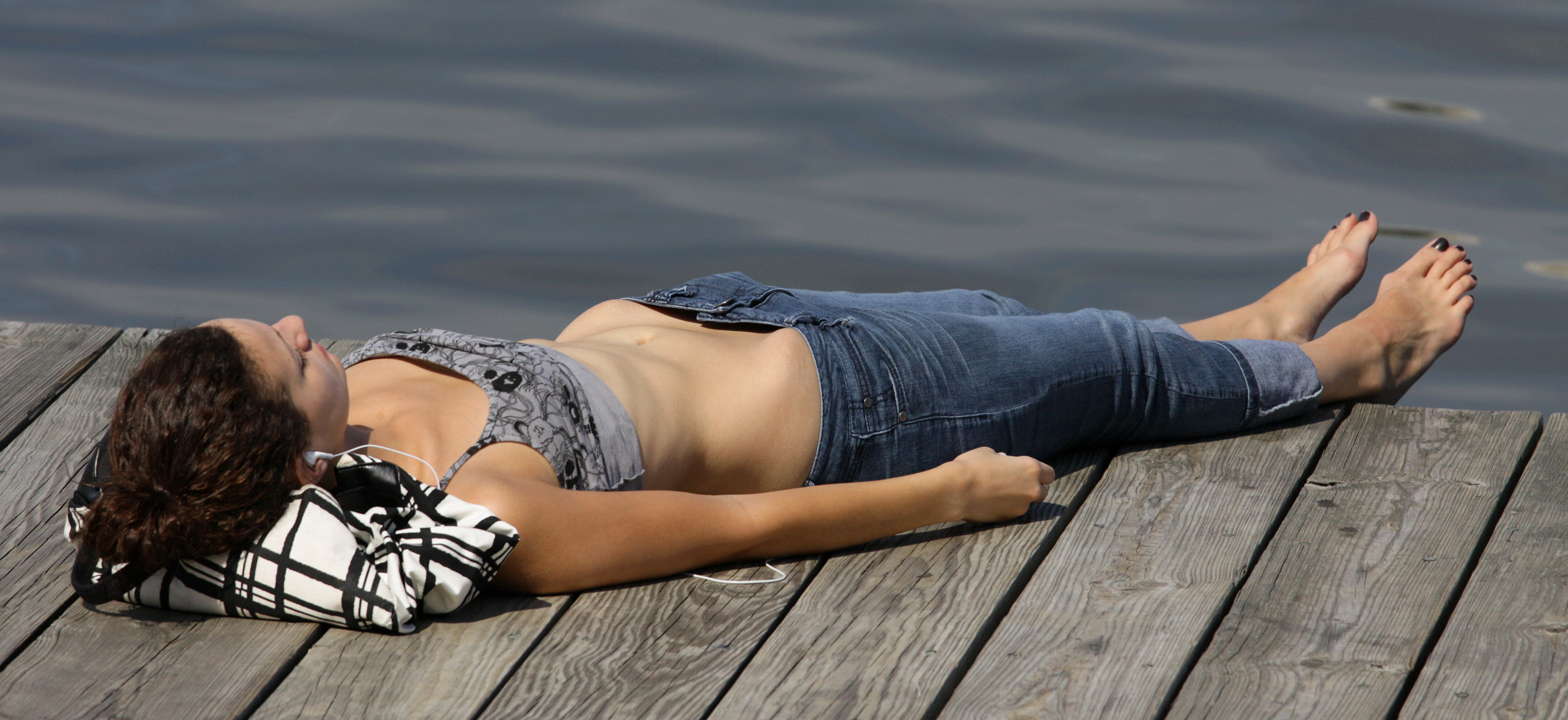
A flickr image tagged as bikini bridge

A bikini bridge is defined as "when bikini bottoms are suspended between the two hip bones, causing a space between the bikini and the lower abdomen". The phrase originated in the United States on January 5, 2014, coined by users on the /b/ board on the imageboard 4chan as a parody of popular thinspiration memes. According to a posting on the website, users intended to spread content across social media regarding bikini bridges. It was reported on by U.S. television program Today on January 7. Several commentators critiqued the posts for displaying insensitivity or being "dangerous" for women with an eating disorder.

Bikini bridges have been described as "fake", and compared to the Chinese trends "Collarbone Challenge", and the "A4 Challenge".
