= Cherry Bikini =

American electropop/electroclash duo

Cherry Bikini is an American, Los Angeles, California, based electropop/electroclash duo, made up of Sophie Boscallini (vocals) and Armand Abagliani (synths, guitars, programming).

== Biography ==
The band started in 2002 in Paris, France, where they recorded their first album, Cherry Bikini (2002). In the next several years, Cherry Bikini achieved underground notoriety due to their hyper-explicit lyrics on songs such as "Just Fuck Me", "Fingers (Inside Me)", and "A Good Hard Lay".

After relocating to Los Angeles in 2003, they recorded and released their second album, Dream Days (2004). Towards the end of that year they released Remixed (2004), a collection of remixes of some of their better known songs by underground DJs and producers. 2007 saw the release of a subsequent album, entitled 13, and in 2012 the duo released an EP called "Sequences". In May 2015, Cherry Bikini released two recordings - Bedroom Stars, a compilation album of their early material, and an EP "This Thing We Got".

The signature Cherry Bikini sound is characterized by Sophie Boscallini's "somewhat detached". take on lust, set over strong electropop hooks and dance beats. Their songs often "deal with sexuality with a matter-of-fact explicitness". All of their albums to date have been self-produced and independently released.

== Solo activities ==
Sophie Boscallini has a long history of working as an actress and model in Europe and the United States. Armand Abagliani has been involved in numerous side projects. He has co-produced several albums.

== Discography ==
=== Albums ===
- Cherry Bikini (2002)
- Dream Days (2004)
- Remixed (2004)
- 13 (2007)
- Sequences (2012)
- Bedroom Stars (2015)
- This Thing We Got (2015)

=== Compilations ===
- Bad Gurrlz (Gay Records) (2003)
