= Miss Bikini of the Universe =

Beauty pageant

Miss Bikini of the Universe is an international beauty pageant held annually in Beihai, Guangxi, China.

In 2009 the pageant was held from September 30 to October 6. It was planned to make a Guinness World Record with a 209-metre (686 ft) T-shaped runway. The theme was "Taking Beauty to Beihai and Introducing Beihai to the World".

In 2006 the pageant was held from August 22 to 26, 2006 at the Silver Beach of Beihai. The winner was Olena Zhygan (Олена Жиган) of Ukraine. That year, the competition gained media attention, because the competitors included Mariyah Moten, a Pakistani woman now living in the American. Moten was the first Pakistani woman to compete in an international bikini beauty pageant. Pakistan being a Muslim nation does not let women take part in bikini pageants. The fact that Moten wore a bikini and held the Pakistani flag caused an uproar in her native country.

In 2005 Marijana Stanojkovska (Маријана Станојковска) of Macedonia was the winner. Miss Turkey Deniz Sirin and Miss Ukraine Olga Shylovanova (Ольга Шiлoвaнoвa) were the first and second runners-up.
