= Mariyah Moten =

Pakistani model

- Born: Mariyah Ashraf Moten; 18 January 1984 (age 42); Karachi, Pakistan
- Occupation: Model
- Modeling information
- Hair color: Brown
- Eye color: Honey brown
- Website: www.mariyahamoten.com

Mariyah Moten is a Pakistani American beauty pageant runner up 4 of Miss Pakistan World 2006.

== Biography ==
Mariyah was born in Karachi, Pakistan. She moved to the US with her family at the age of 5 and currently resides in the United States. Mariyah Moten graduated from University of Houston in with a degree in hotel management. Moten is now married to an American and resides in Houston, Texas.

== Beauty pageants ==
After placing Top 5 at the Miss Pakistan World, a, the Miss Pakistan World organization sent Moten to represent Pakistan at the Miss Tourism Queen International pageant in 2006, where she won the Miss Charity Title among 87 other contestants. Later that year she competed in the Miss Bikini of the Universe pageant which was held in Beihai, China. This created an outrage among the Muslim community in Pakistan. This was the first time a Pakistani girl has participated in a bikini pageant representing the Islamic majority nation. Due to this controversy, Mariyah Moten won the Best In Media/Miss Press title for being the most photographed and interviewed contestant in the entire pageant.

Mariyah Moten, then represented Pakistan in a few other international pageants.

== Controversy ==
In 2006, Mariyah Moten received criticism from Pakistani government officials for using the title Miss Pakistan Bikini. This was the first time a Pakistani girl participated in an international bikini beauty pageant overcoming the traditional barriers of the Islamic majority nation. Muslim leaders showed outrage when she won Best in Media. Mariyah's controversy landed her on the cover of Sexy South Asian Girls 2007 calendar.

== See also ==
- History of the Pakistani Americans in Houston
