= Bikini Karate Babes =

2002 video game

- Developer: Creative Edge Studios
- Platforms: Microsoft Windows, macOS
- Release: 2002
- Genre: Fighting
- Mode: Up to 2 players with 10 available modes

Bikini Karate Babes is a 2002 2D fighting video game that uses digitized graphics, developed by Creative Edge Studios. It features an all-female cast of 19 fighters, all clad in bikinis and played by real actresses. The game was developed as a response to the treatment of women in contemporary fighting games, who would be portrayed in skimpy, sexualized clothing while male characters were fully dressed.

The game received strongly negative reviews, with a 8.5% aggregate score on GameRankings and a 1.5 out of 10 from IGN. Nonetheless, its developer Creative Edge Studios referred to it as a "solid seller". A sequel, Bikini Karate Babes 2: Warriors of Elysia, was released in 2011.

== Gameplay ==
The game plays similarly to other 2D fighting games and has been likened to Street Fighter II and Mortal Kombat. There are 8 characters to select from initially and 11 more that can be unlocked. All the characters' names are based on goddesses of mythology, and each character's traits correspond to that fact. Each character has a set of moves and combos, which can be performed by use of the directional buttons and the three basic attack buttons, Punch, Kick and Special. The Special button pressed alone produces a grab move which, unlike other fighting games, varies depending on the opponent.

Each character has an array of martial arts moves, a grab move and also a mystical move, which varies from firing a projectile to invisibility to teleportation. Examples include Thalia's tickle grab, Lucina's mystic move which has her lowering her bikini top and shooting a laser beam from her breasts, Zaria's grab which has her turning her opponent around then pushing her backside away with her own, and Venus's grab in which she strips her opponent of her bikini top making her too embarrassed to fight. Several other moves make a fighter remove her bikini top/bottom, but the bare parts are always somewhat covered (in Lucina's aforementioned move, because of the flare of the laser); full nudity is never shown in the game.

Bikini Karate Babes features 10 distinct game modes:

- Arcade – 1-Player Story Mode.
- Battle Babes – 2-player Mode.
- Team Fight – Each player selects up to 8 characters. When one is defeated, the next takes her place.
- Marathon – The player attempts to defeat as many opponents as possible.
- Practice
- Challenge – The player challenges a specific fighter to get access to her Sweet Stuff (see note below).
- Spectacle – Two CPU-controlled fighters of the player's choice fight amongst themselves.
- Top Collector – The player plays as Venus against 5 specific fighters, and win if they use Venus' special throw to remove all her opponents' bikinis.
- Vegas – The player places bets as they watch the BKB fighters fight amongst themselves.
- Invincible Mode – Same as Arcade Mode but the player's life does not run out.

== Development ==
Bikini Karate Babes was created in order to "poke fun at the state of fighting games of the day." This was in response to fighting games featuring women characters with increasingly revealing clothing while male characters appeared in full body armor.

The grab sequences were recorded with both fighters together in the scene, a total of 342 unique sequences were filmed for the game.

== Reception ==
Reception

Aggregate score
Aggregator	Score
GameRankings	8.5%

Review score
Publication	Score
IGN	(1.5/10)

The game generated media attention but reviews were largely negative. Video gaming website IGN scored the game 1.5 out of 10, an "unbearable" rating. Creative Edge Studios have stated that Bikini Karate Babes has been "a solid seller", despite the negative press.

== Sequels ==
The sequel, named Bikini Karate Babes 2: Warriors of Elysia was released in North America on June 21, 2011. The graphics were upgraded from 8-bit to 24-bit images. Travis Riggs was the creative director and music director for the project. The game has been developed for various mobile devices with improved soundtrack, animation, and visual effect. Twenty-four unique sounding tracks have been invented by Andy Sikorski. Hybrids of heavy metal, classic music, hip-hop, techno and traditional Arabic songs have been invented in the process of creating the soundtrack.

A third title, Bikini Karate Babes 3 is available for Android devices.
