= Bikini Bloodbath =

- Directed by: Jonathan Gorman; Thomas Edward Seymour
- Written by: Jonathan Gorman; Thomas Edward Seymour
- Produced by: Robert Cosgrove Jr. Sheri Lynn
- Starring: Debbie Rochon; Robert Cosgrove Jr. Sheri Lynn; Russ Russo
- Cinematography: Mike Anderson
- Edited by: Christopher W. Doyle
- Music by: Tim Kulig
- Distributed by: Blood Bath Pictures
- Release date: September 16, 2006
- Running time: 72 minutes
- Country: United States
- Language: English

Bikini Bloodbath is a 2006 comedy film that parodies the horror-slasher movies of the 1980s. Written and directed by Jonathan Gorman and Thomas Edward Seymour, the film focuses on a high school girls’ volleyball team that plans to host an end-of-semester party. Two members of the boys’ football team crash the party, but problems begin when the maniacal Chef Death, a serial killer portrayed by Rob Coz, who wields meat cleavers and culinary one-liners, interrupts the proceedings by slaying the partygoers.

Shot on locations across Connecticut in 2005, Bikini Bloodbath was planned as the first in an ongoing horror/comedy series. The film was released on DVD in December 2007, and its sequels – Bikini Bloodbath Car Wash (named the "#1 Ridiculous (ly Awesome) Horror Movie Titles of all time in 2010 by Mark H. Harris, About.com Guide). And Bikini Bloodbath Christmas are also out on DVD. Co-director Seymour cited the Peter Jackson The Lord of the Rings trilogy for the inspiration of creating back-to-back films. Additional films in the Bikini Bloodbath series are being planned. Debbie Rochon stars in all three films as a volleyball coach. Other actors in the series include Lloyd Kaufman, Rachael Robbins, Monique GATA Dupree and Sheri Lynn.

== Cast ==
- Debbie Rochon as Miss Johnson
- Robert Cosgrove Jr. as The Chef / William Leschenski (credited as Robert Cosgrove)
- Sheri Lynn as Suzy "Smelly Suzy" (credited as Sheri Bomb)
- Russ Russo as Mike "Mike M"
- Leah Ford as Jenny
- Anna-Karin Eskilsson as Sharon
- Katie Gil as Portia
- Natasha Nielsen as Tawny
- Olja Hrustic as Ginger
