= Breastaurant =

Restaurant that employs skimpily-dressed waitresses

A breastaurant is a restaurant that requires female waiting staff to be dressed skimpily. The term dates from the early 1990s after restaurant chain Hooters opened in the United States. The format has since been adopted by other restaurants, including Tilted Kilt Pub & Eatery, Twin Peaks, Ojos Locos, Bikinis Sports Bar & Grill, The WingHouse Bar & Grill, Redneck Heaven, Rowdy Cowboy, Boomer Jacks, and Bombshells Bar & Grill.

These restaurants often use a sexual double-entendre brand name and may also be themed. The restaurants may offer perks for customers, such as alcoholic drinks and flirty servers.

== History ==
Hooters is credited as the first breastaurant, having operated since 1983. Other companies soon adopted the format. According to food industry research firm Technomic, the top three breastaurant chains in the United States after Hooters each had sales growth of 30% or more in 2011.

In October 2012, Bikinis Sports Bar & Grill successfully registered the term "breastaurant" as a trademark with the United States Patent and Trademark Office; but as of May 24, 2019, the trademark lapsed under section 8, "Continued use not filed within Grace Period". Bikinis Sports Bar & Grill had closed its last restaurant on December 23, 2018.

== Male variations ==
Restaurants staffed by males, with a similar focus on server appearance, include Tallywackers, featuring scantily clad men, which opened in Dallas, Texas, in May 2015 and closed in August 2016. In Japan, there are pop-up establishments such as Macho Cafe and Macho Meat Shop, where brawny men serve food and drinks.

== Criticism ==
Breastaurants have been criticized for sexually objectifying women.

== Gallery ==
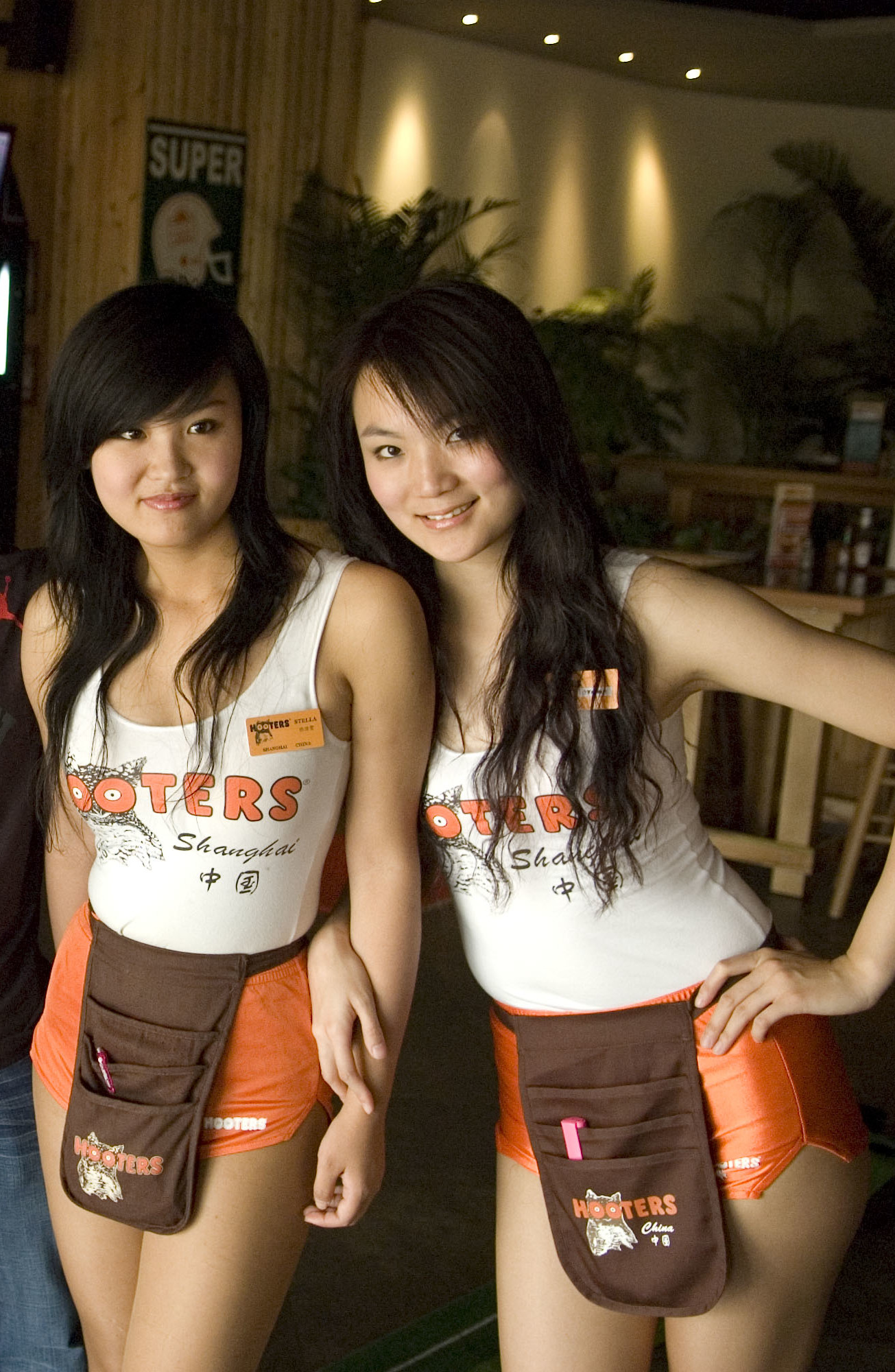
Hooters employees in Shanghai, China, 2007

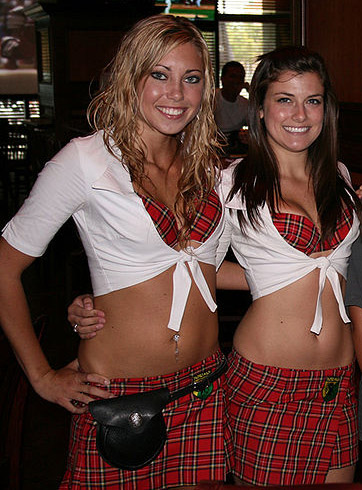
Tilted Kilt Pub & Eatery in uniform, 2008

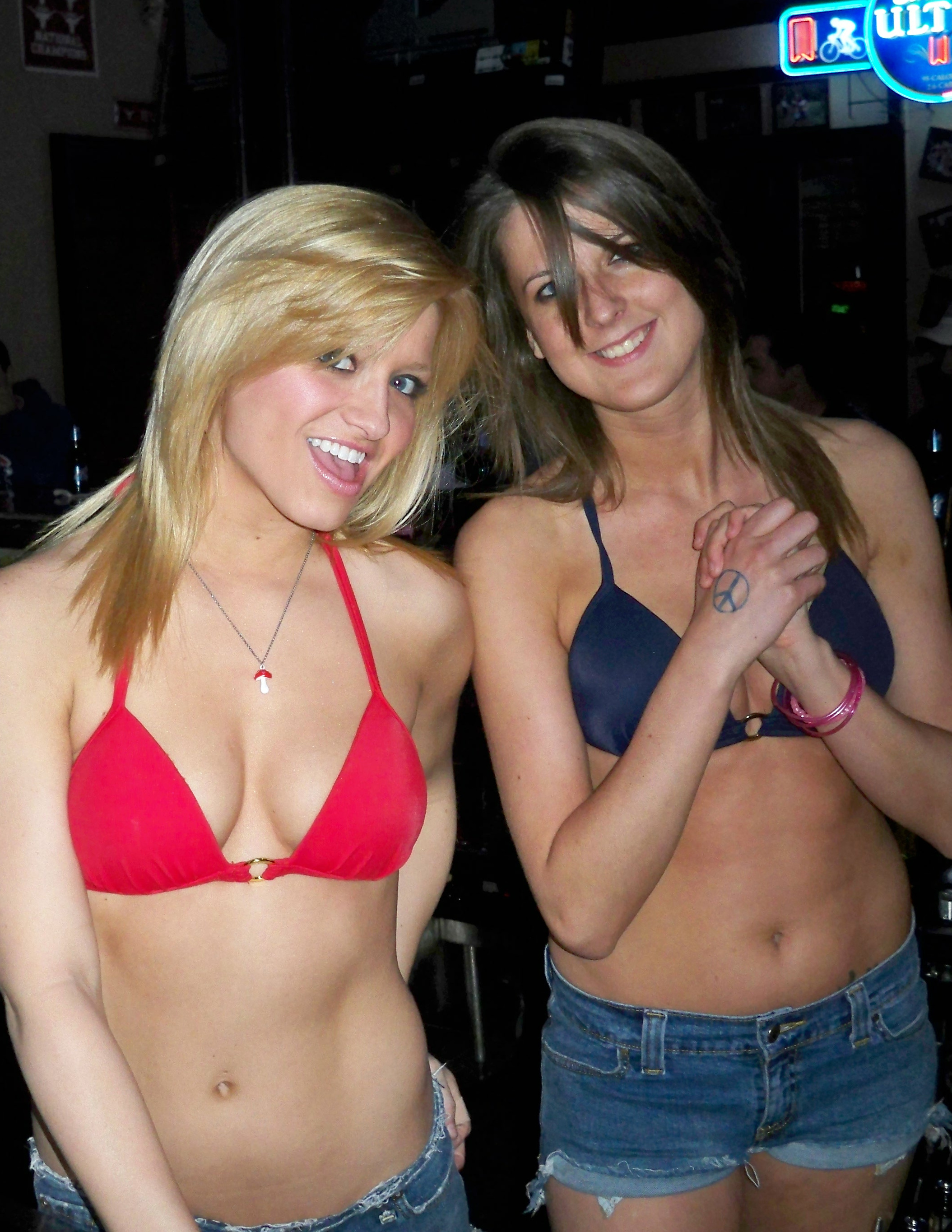
Waitresses at an Bikinis Sports Bar & Grill in Austin, 2010

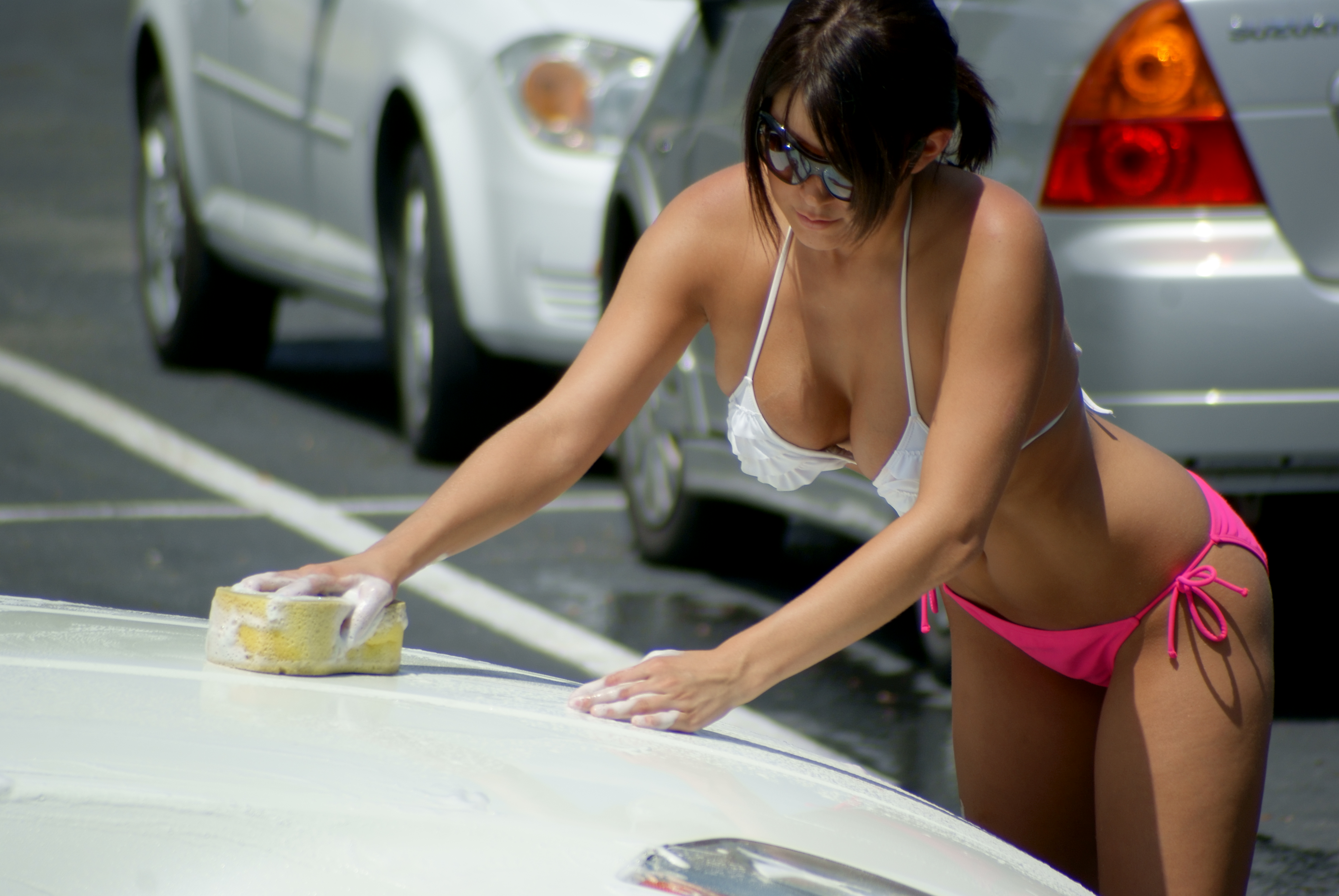
At an Austin Twin Peaks, a waitress washes a customer's car while wearing a bikini in 2012.

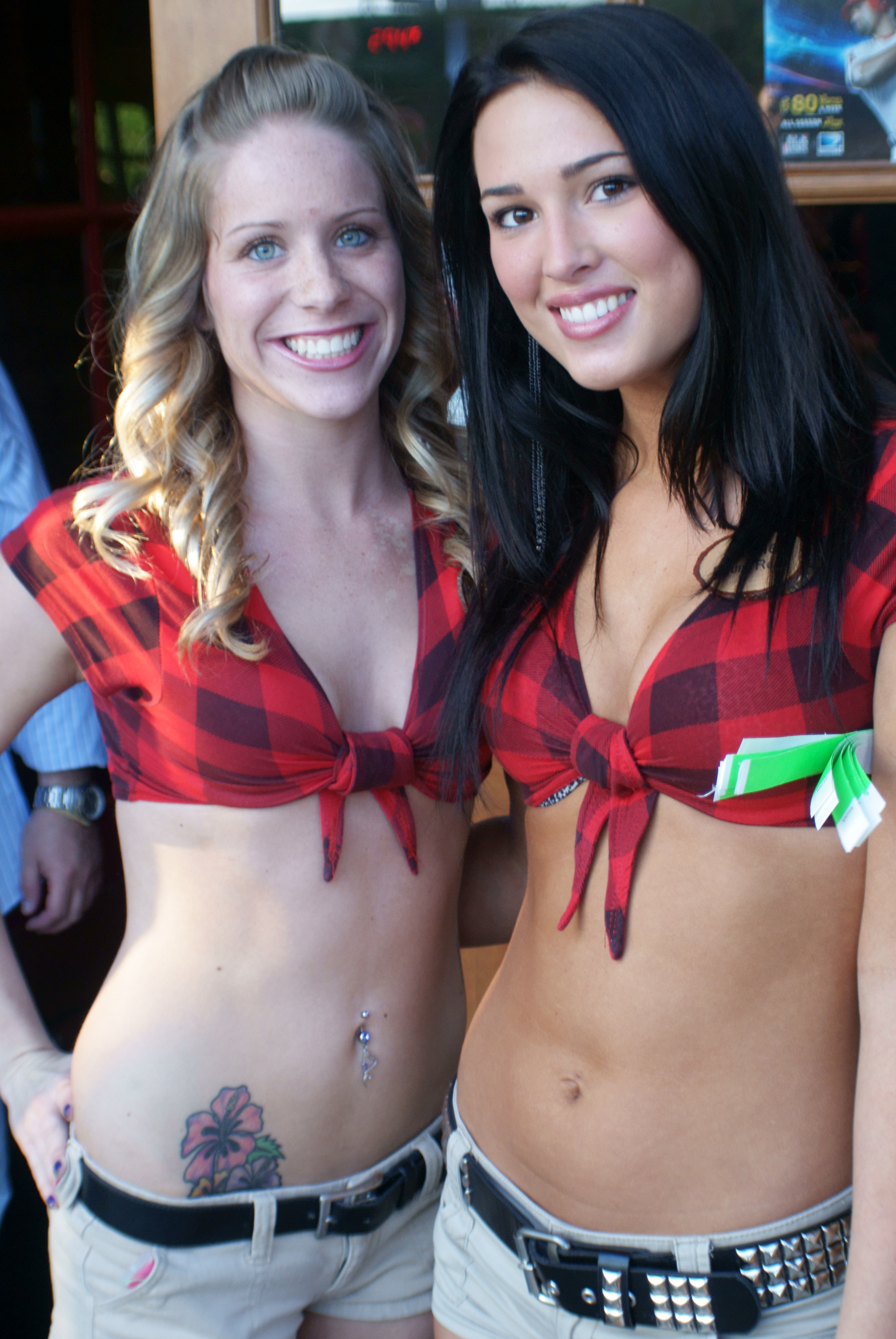
Twin Peaks waitresses in regular uniform in 2012

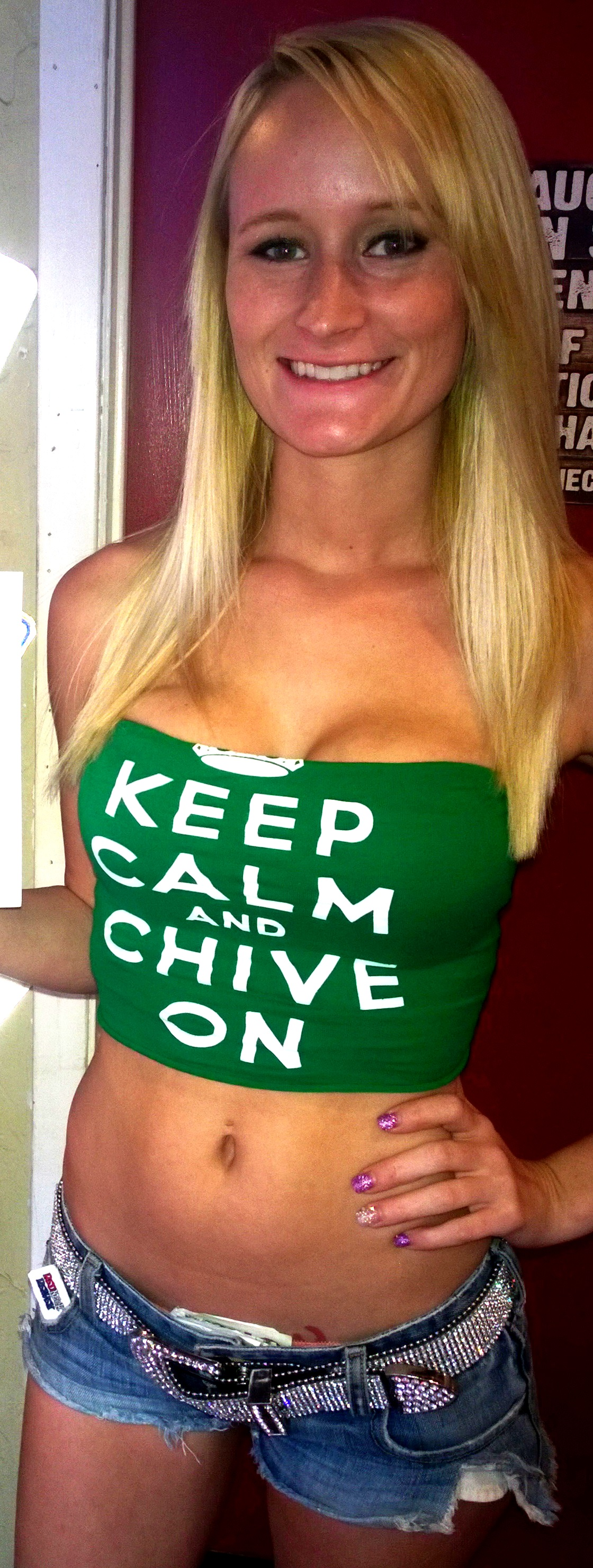
Redneck Heaven waitress wearing the uniform in 2013

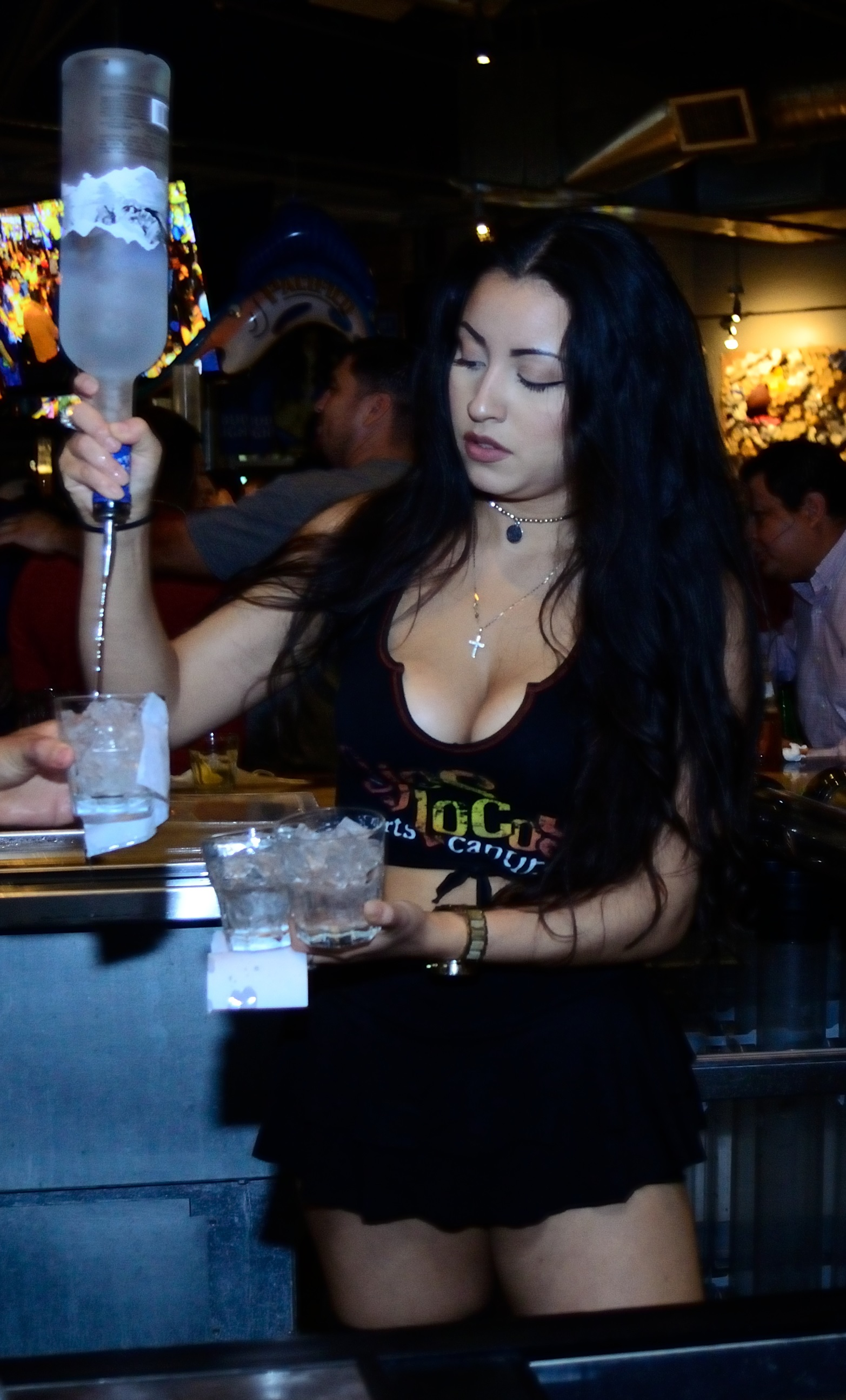
Ojos Locos waitress working in regular uniform in 2016

== See also ==
- Betel nut beauty
- Bikini barista
- Butler café
- Café con piernas
- Cosplay restaurant
- Hooters Air
- Host and hostess clubs
- Maid café
- No-pan kissa
- Playboy Club
- Sip 'n Dip Lounge
- Wet T-shirt contest
