= Bikini barista =

Person who serves coffee while dressed in two-piece swimwear

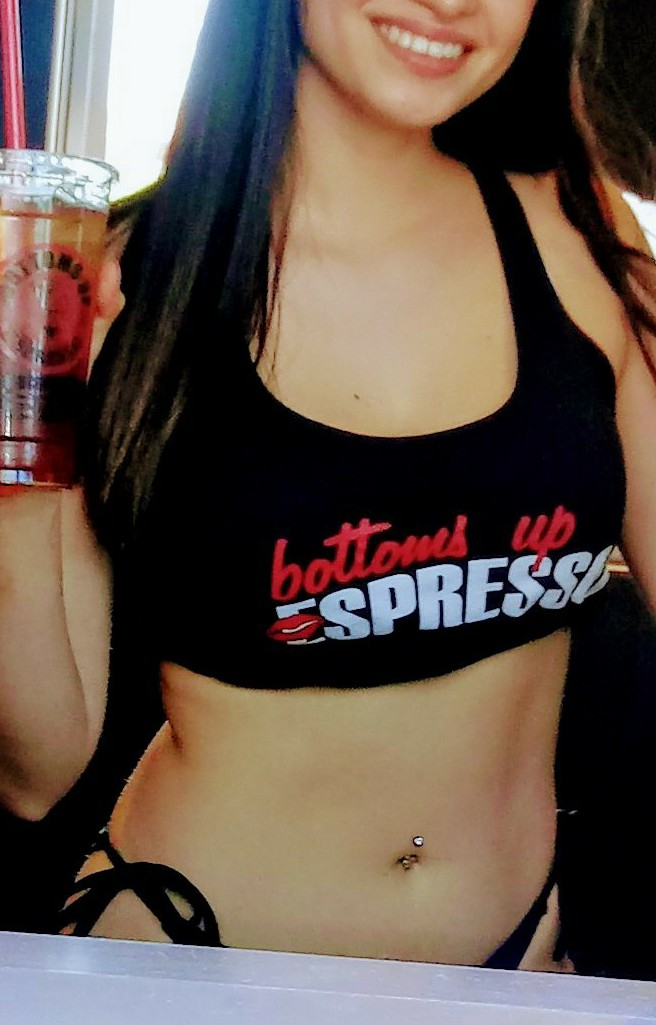
- A bikini barista at Bottoms Up Espresso's drive-thru in Clovis, California (2020)

Description
- Competencies: Serving foods and beverages in exotic apparel such as bikini or lingerie
- Fields of employment: Food service
- Related jobs: Barista

A bikini barista is a woman who works as a barista, preparing and serving coffee beverages, while dressed in scanty attire such as a bikini, lingerie or a crop top combined with bikini bottoms or hotpants. In the United States, this marketing technique (sometimes referred to as sexpresso or bareista) originated in the Seattle, Washington, area in the early 2000s. Similar phenomena have appeared in countries such as Chile.

== Development of concept ==
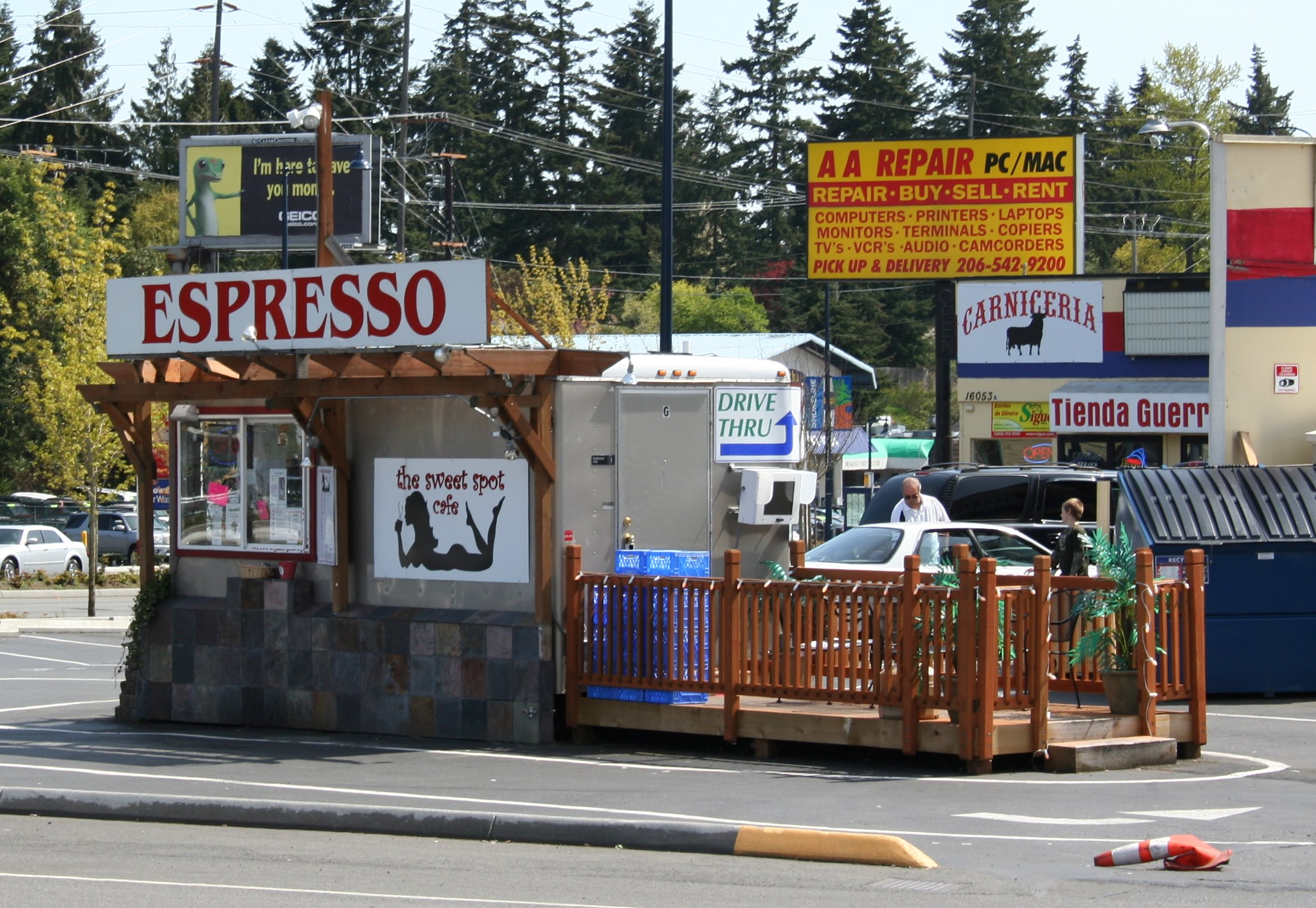
The Sweet Spot Cafe in Shoreline, Washington

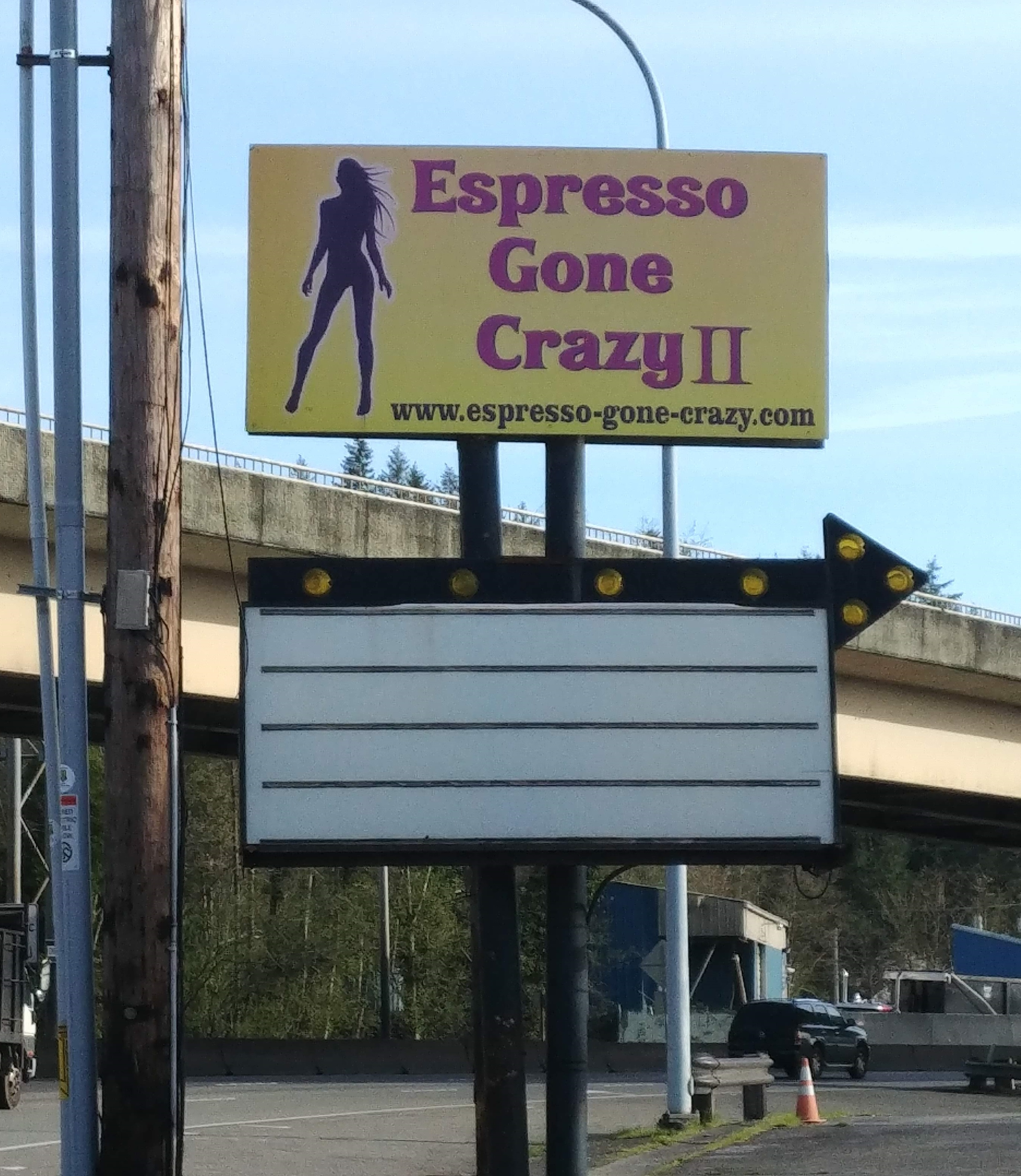
"Espresso Gone Crazy" is an example of the branding used by bikini barista stands.

Sexpresso drive-through stands and coffee outlets are numerous in the greater Seattle area, so much so that coffee stands that have fully clothed employees often advertise themselves as "family friendly". The exact inventor of the "bikini barista" concept is debated. The "Natte Latte" chain's first location was opened in November 1999 by Mary Keller, in Bremerton, Washington. Its employees began sporting pink leather hotpants in 2001. Next, in 2003, "Cowgirls Espresso" opened its first location in Tukwila, Washington. A few months after opening, as summer heat invaded the small 70-square-foot (6.5 m^{2}) shop, owner Lori Bowden adopted employee suggestions that they start a "Bikini Wednesday" promotion. Sales took off, and other scantily-clad theme days soon followed. The concept of "bikini baristas" spread quickly, featuring attractive young women dressed in attire such as bikinis, lingerie, stockings, and heels. The first round of international press attention to the trend occurred in early 2007. Competitors that have not followed suit have complained about the trend, and have also seen a drop in business.

The retail establishments that employ bikini baristas often adopt titillating names, including "Peek A-Brew", "Grab n' Go", "Cowgirls Espresso", "Smokin' Hot Espresso", "Knotty Bodies Espresso", "Java Jigglers", "Espresso Gone Crazy", "Espresso Gone Wild", "ChickaLatte", "Java Girls", "Sweet Spot", "Fantasy Espresso", and "Natte Latte".

== Controversies and litigation ==
The employment of bikini baristas has sometimes caused controversy and complaints from local residents.

As a result of these complaints and incidents, some local jurisdictions have considered adopting local ordinances to regulate and control the activities of the stores.

=== In Snohomish County ===
Undercover police officers in Snohomish County, Washington, witnessed some baristas performing additional services for extra money, including letting customers touch them, photograph them, or watch them lick whipped cream off each other. These statements were retracted by the police department in Everett, Washington, as the undercover police officer was a known customer and offered money to the barista. The Everett police department was accused of entrapment. In September 2009, five baristas at a Grab 'n Go in Everett were charged with prostitution after police surveillance caught them stripping and performing sexual acts for cash. Other complaints were in regard to the stand's proximity to preschools and daycare centers.

In July 2011, the owner and three employees of Java Juggs in Edmonds, Washington, were charged with prostitution, with the police later releasing some footage obtained.

Everett (the county seat of and the largest city in Snohomish County) was temporarily enjoined against enforcing a dress code ordinance against bikini baristas in December 2017 by U.S. District Court Judge Marsha J. Pechman, who found it unconstitutionally vague, violated their freedom of expression under the First Amendment, and unconstitutional under the Equal Protection Clause of the Fourteenth Amendment since it primarily targeted women. In March 2018, the city filed an appeal with the Ninth U.S. Circuit Court of Appeals and requested the injunction be lifted. The City of Everett was granted that appeal in July 2019; the case was referred back to the U.S. District Court, where Judge Ricardo S. Martinez subsequently ruled against the city in October 2022, supporting the premise of the ordinance violating the Equal Protection Clause but rejecting the baristas' argument of it violating their freedom of expression.

=== In Belfair, Washington ===
In another incident, "Espresso Gone Wild" in Belfair, Washington, was temporarily shut down by Mason County in August 2008. It drew the ire of Belfair residents. Mason County officials responded to complaints in the July 30, 2008, meeting by ruling the espresso stand is "erotic entertainment" and off limits in the Belfair area. The owners of "Espresso Gone Wild" in Belfair were being told that their baristas were violating an erotic entertainment ordinance. They were also told that their baristas need to cover up and clean up their act or the stand would be shut down permanently. Mason County Commissioner Tim Sheldon said the owners of "Espresso Gone Wild" are welcome to open a coffee shop and compete with all the other coffee shops in town. Sheldon also says the owners can not sell sex and coffee on the side. "Espresso Gone Wild" in Belfair, Washington, was prohibited from allowing employees to wear pasties and their baristas now wear bikinis. Residents in another community have surveilled a local stand and called for boycotts of companies whose employees patronize the establishments.

=== In Yakima, Washington ===
In Yakima, Washington, a bikini bar owner was sentenced to 100 hours of community service and fined $1,000 because, at the coffee shop, the barista "wore shorts determined to be both too skimpy and too sheer. A city ordinance bans bikini baristas from wearing G-strings and see-through clothing." The barista was charged but acquitted by the jury in the indecent exposure case.

== Growth outside Seattle area ==
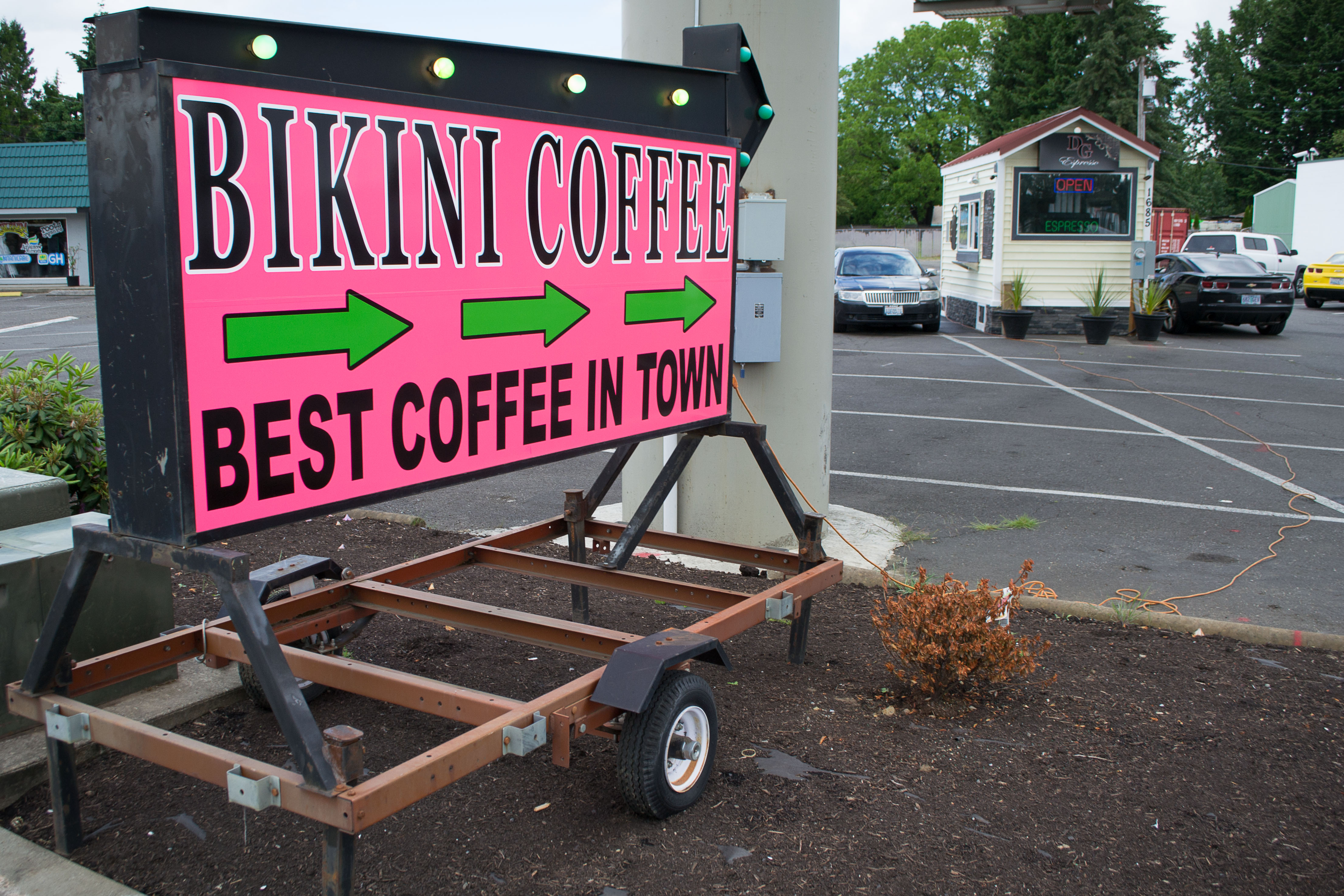
A bikini barista coffee kiosk in Hillsboro, Oregon

Some entrepreneurs have opened bikini barista stores with success outside the Seattle area, including in Raleigh, North Carolina, Aurora, Colorado, Portland, Oregon, Youngstown, Ohio, Tampa, Florida, Pasadena, Maryland, Chatsworth, Georgia, Las Vegas, Texas, and Missouri. A company called "Baristas" has been dubbed the Hooters of coffee due to its size and popularity in the market. Hooters is a place in which scantily clad women serve food and drinks to patrons.

A Los Angeles area store called "Bikini Espresso" only lasted four months in the Los Angeles area in 2009, and closed with complaints of over-regulation.

One chain in particular called "Bottoms Up Espresso", who have expanded into multiple Northern California markets including locations in Modesto, Tracy, Clovis, Bakersfield, and Vernalis has quickly become a favorite among social media users with their baristas featured regularly on the website The Chive and other popular websites. With the brands growing popularity they have expanded into a mobile food truck style service and expanded into its line of merchandise including yearly calendars featuring their current line up of bikini baristas.

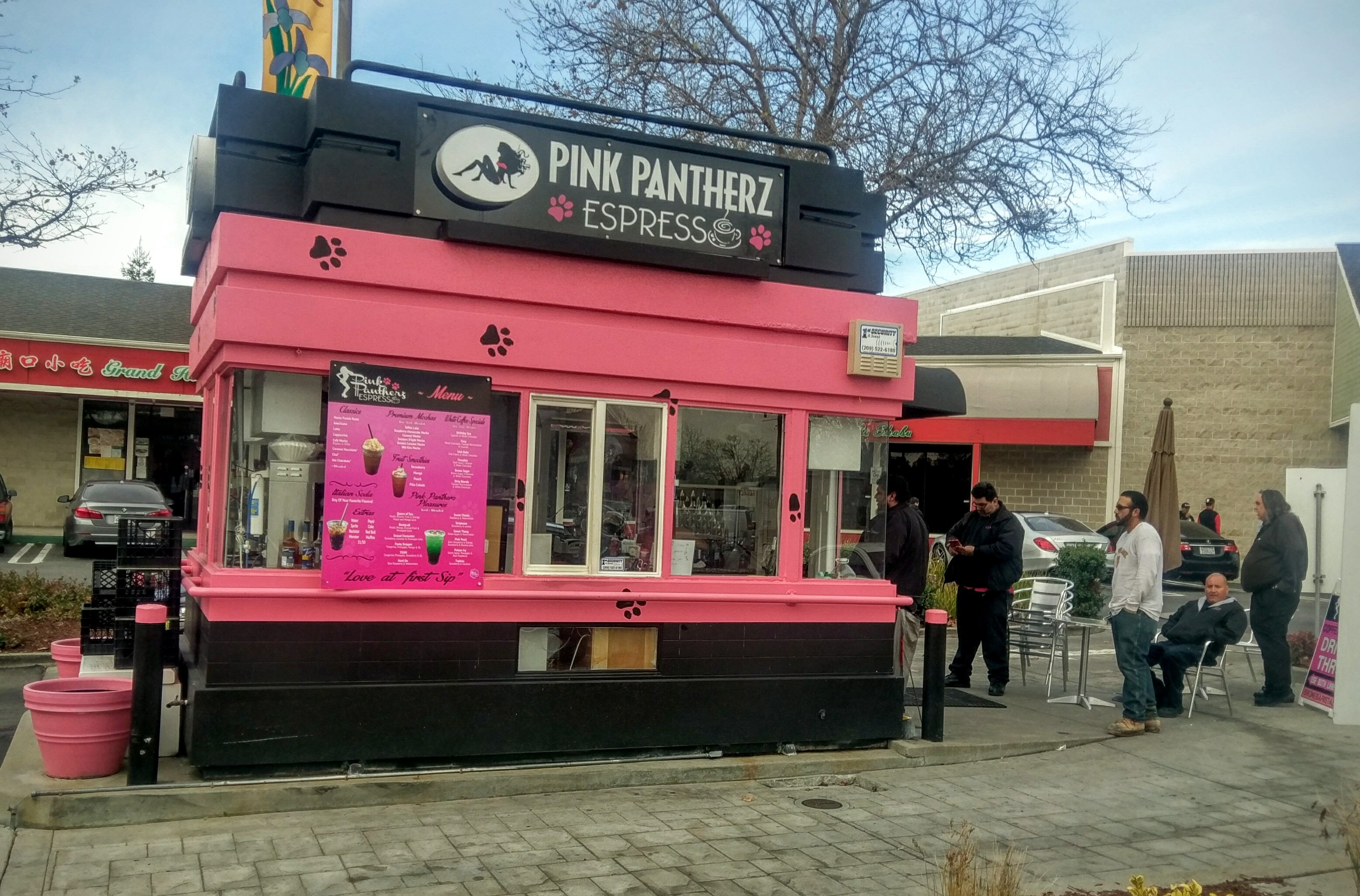
A Pink Pantherz kiosk in Fremont, California

Two bikini barista businesses opened in northwest Fresno, California, Java Girls Espresso and Pink Pantherz Espresso, c. mid 2014.

== Reported incidents ==
- On May 26, 2017, a 29-year-old repeat sex offender was arrested for indecent exposure after he masturbated in front of a bikini barista around 5 a.m. at Sweet Cheeks Espresso's 5005 Auburn Way North stand in Auburn, Washington.
- On February 20, 2018, a 30-year-old man attempted to rape a 30-year-old bikini barista with a knife around 4:45 a.m in Kent, Washington.
- On August 26, 2019, an armed robbery occurred at Foxy Lady Latte, a bikini barista coffee stand in Mount Vernon, Washington, located at 2626 Henson Road, before 7 p.m.
- On September 13, 2020, in Pasco, Washington, a repeating lewd offender was arrested for indecent exposure by displaying his genitals and masturbating outside the drive-thru window of Hot Beans Espresso on West Sylvester Street and North 26th Avenue, in the presence of outraged bikini baristas and customers nearby. It is reported that the offender was mentally ill.
- On January 16, 2023, in Auburn, Washington, a patron attempted to kidnap a barista at Beankini Espresso.
- On January 8, 2025, in Tempe, Arizona, a patron took off his pants in the drive-thru of Bikini Beans Coffee. Two days later, he committed suicide after video of it went viral online.

== Outside the United States ==
- Laura Maggi, a woman in her mid 30s, became a national celebrity in Italy in 2012 as a result of starting a habit of coming to work in revealing attire at the coffee bar called Le Cafe that she owns and operates in the small Italian town of Bagnolo Mella. She continues to generate local controversy serving "sexpresso" as she wears a variety of revealing outfits when serving customers. She also has female assistants who do the same, and sells glamour calendars of herself in addition to the coffee. Maggi has been the subject of photo-illustrated articles in popular tabloids.
- A phenomenon similar to bikini baristas is very popular in Chile, known as "café con piernas" (literally, coffee with legs) and existed long before their Seattle counterpart.
- In Taiwan, young women who sell betel nuts and cigarettes from brightly lit glass enclosures while wearing revealing clothing are called betel nut beauties. They debuted in the 1960s.
- In Japan, "girls bars" employ female staff dressed in bikinis and sarongs. "No-pan kissa" (lit. 'no-panty coffee shops') appeared in the 1980s, with waitresses wearing short skirts and no panties. Typical of Japanese sex-fads, they did not last more than a few years before they transformed into other (but similar) businesses.
- In Surfers Paradise, Queensland, Australia, gold lycra bikini-clad meter maids stroll up and down the beach feeding coins into parking meters so that beach-goers do not get parking tickets. Though feeding meters is illegal in Surfers Paradise, local law enforcement is encouraged to look the other way, as the meter maids not only keep tourists happy, but they have also become a tourist attraction themselves.

== Sex work ==
In a column published in Sociological Images, the sociologist Lisa Wade used the bikini barista as a launching point for a discussion of the boundaries of sex work. The question has also been the subject of an essay published in The Atlantic.

== See also ==
- Breastaurant
- Hooters
- Mizu shōbai
