= Saisai Itsuki =

Pornographic actress

- 齋齋いつき
- Born: Taiwan
- Other names: Saisai (齋齋) "Zhaizhai" (Chinese: 齋齋) "Zhaizhai tree" (Chinese: 齋齋樹)
- Occupations: Pornographic film actress; actress
- Years active: 2025–present
- Known for: First Taiwanese porn actress of Soft On Demand
- Height: 1.53 m (5 ft 0 in)

Saisai Itsuki (Japanese: 齋齋いつき) is a Taiwan-based pornographic actress under Soft On Demand (SOD). She is the first Taiwanese and foreign porn actress of the company. Both "Saisai" and "Saisai Itsuki" are her stage names.

== Biography ==
Saisai was born in Taiwan. Her father, a high-ranking police officer, and her mother, a media professional, raised her alongside an older sister. Her fascination with pornography began in elementary school when the sisters accidentally discovered their father's collection. Since then, she dreamed of becoming a pornographic actress or a betel nut beauty. Her first love and sexual experience occurred in senior high school, and she later graduated from college. According to Soft On Demand, Saisai studied at an art school, though details remain scarce.

Fluent in Chinese, Japanese, and English, Saisai fascinated with Japanese culture and its pornography. She worked in maid café and Japanese snack bar (スナック) before entering the adult film industry. Saisai's family awared her her ties to the adult community when her father found photos of her in a BDSM community. Before her acting career, Saisai shared her thoughts through presentation software.

At her friend's request, Saisai attended an adult event, where a Japanese staff member took an interest in her. The staff invited Saisai to audition for SOD, which was seeking an actress from Taiwan. On 8 August 2025, SOD signed a contract with Saisai, and she is the company's first Taiwanese adult performer. Her debut film, A new generation beauty from Taiwan, Saisai Itsuki, joins the Japanese AV industry! The first Taiwanese actress in SOD history, powered by her admiration. From a top influencer to a Japanese AV actress... (台湾発 新世代の美少女 齋齋いつき 日本AV界に参戦！SOD史上初 台湾人専属女優‘憧れ‘をパワーに。トップ級インフルエンサーから日本のAV女優へ…), was released on 19 August 2025. They also allow Saisai showing her tattoo during filming. She began filming her second work in September 2025 and was released on 23 September 2025.

=== Personality ===
Flavor described Saisai's personality as "Freedom pursuer", "Anti-authoritarian", "Critic to a system", and "firm pursuiter". Usually she fights back against those who cyberbullied her. According to an interview, Saisai's was bullied during her middle school, mostly about her appearance and the experience made her developed appearance anxiety and bipolar disorder. In her social network, Saisai improved her appearance with makeup and facial expression without performing plastic surgery. Saisai's hoppy is listening music, and punk rock is her favoutite genre. Her favoutite bands includes Green Day, SUM 41, BLINK-182, and Hi-STANDARD.

== Filmography ==
Saisai's pornographic works
ID	Name in Japanese	Released date
FTAV-013	台湾発 新世代の美少女 齋齋いつき 日本AV界に参戦！SOD史上初 台湾人専属女優‘憧れ‘をパワーに。トップ級インフルエンサーから日本のAV女優へ…	August 18, 2025
FTAV-011	こんな顔してえっっっぐいアクメするほどデカチン狂でした。総fw60万人の台湾美	October 23, 2025
FTAV-012	目と目で繋がる! あなたの初めての日×台0距離交流!! 初主観 齋齋いつきを超密	November 20, 2025
FTAV-014	Total12時間ずぅーーーーーーとカメラ目線生活チャレンジ!! 移動中も、食	December 18, 2025
FTAV-015	いきなり全身拘束から始まる24時間リアル大脱出 齋齋いつき史上最難解のパニックイライラ?!sexドキュメント! 累計: 総フォロワー40万人台	January 22, 2026
FTAV-016	台湾メスガキインフルエンサー 齋齋いつき 中出し解禁。日本のオジに囲まれ8p超乱交。	February 19, 2026
