= Ojos Locos Sports Cantina y Casino =

Casino and hotel in Las Vegas, Nevada

Coordinates: 36°13′7″N 115°7′17″W

- Former Lucky Club logo
- Interactive map of Ojos Locos Sports Cantina y Casino
- Location: North Las Vegas, Nevada; 3227 Civic Center Drive
- Opened: 1991 (as Days Inn
- No. of rooms: 90
- Gaming space: 11,953 sq ft (1,110.5 m^{2})
- Casino type: Land-based
- Owner: Fifth Street Gaming
- Previous names: Budget Host Inn; Cheyenne Hotel; Ramada Inn and Speedway Casino; Lucky Club

Ojos Locos Sports Cantina y Casino is a casino in North Las Vegas, Nevada. The property is owned and operated by Fifth Street Gaming. It includes an Ojos Locos sports bar and restaurant, as well as a 90-room hotel known as Hotel Jefe.

The hotel was built in 1991, and originally operated as a Days Inn. Shawn Scott, a casino owner, bought the hotel in 1995 and renamed it the Cheyenne Hotel. By 1997, he had added slot machines to the hotel's bar. MTR Gaming bought the Cheyenne in 1998 and added a casino structure the following year. The company renamed the property as the Speedway Casino and gave it a motor racing theme, in reference to the nearby Las Vegas Motor Speedway. In 2008, the property was sold to its present owner, which operated it as the Lucky Club until the Ojos Locos rebrand in 2023.

== History ==
The hotel-casino is located at 3227 Civic Center Drive, at the intersection of Cheyenne Avenue. The hotel, built in 1991, originally operated as a Days Inn. It was owned by Frank Paul Silver, a North Las Vegas obstetrician, who also owned the Crystal Palace casino in Laughlin, Nevada. In the 1980s, Silver planned to open a casino on the North Las Vegas site known as the Cheyenne Gambling Hall and Saloon. However, he was unable to acquire a gaming license.

By June 1995, the hotel was known as the Budget Host Inn and struggling in bankruptcy. It was sold that month to Shawn Scott, who owned the Post Office Casino in Henderson, Nevada. Scott acquired the Budget Host Inn at auction for $1.1 million. He renamed it the Cheyenne Hotel and sought to revitalize the run-down property. His plans included the reopening of a restaurant and lounge, and the addition of a casino, taking advantage of the site's grandfathered gaming status. Scott requested a license for 75 slot machines and 2 table games, but the Nevada Gaming Commission found his record management to be sloppy. In December 1996, the commission issued only an 11-month limited license for 25 machines, which operated in the hotel's bar.

=== Speedway Casino (1999–2008) ===
In May 1998, MTR Gaming acquired the Cheyenne for $5.5 million in cash. The company said it would complete an expansion, already in progress, which included a 10,000 square feet (930 m^{2}) casino structure. The Cheyenne was renamed the Speedway Casino and given a motor racing theme, in reference to the nearby Las Vegas Motor Speedway. The hotel portion was renovated and became part of the Ramada Inn chain.

The casino opened in March 1999, leased to Dynasty Games, with 143 slot machines. MTR received its gaming license the following September, and said it would take over operation of the casino on October 1. The official grand opening was held in March 2000, with the casino having expanded to over 300 slot machines, with table games and a Leroy's sportsbook, racing-themed dining areas, and a racecar simulator. Dan Neil of the Los Angeles Times later called it a "desperate and sketchy little casino" and a "hilariously low-rent, beer-for-breakfast venue" with "some surprisingly good airbrushed banners of great racing scenes".

By November 2000, the property had failed to turn a profit, and was taking measures to attract value-conscious guests, including Hispanics, Nellis Air Force Base personnel, and North Las Vegas residents. By 2004, MTR was reporting annual net revenue of $9.8 million at the Speedway.

In February 2007, MTR agreed to sell the complex to Mandekic Cos. for $18.2 million. Mandekic assigned its agreement in May to Ganaste, LLC, a partnership of three investors managed by Seth Schorr, son of Wynn Resorts COO Marc Schorr. The buyers hoped to use the Speedway as a training ground to learn the gaming business before moving on to other acquisitions. The sale of the land and buildings was completed in January 2008 for $11.4 million, with MTR continuing to operate the casino, leasing it for $70,000 a month.

=== Further name changes (2008–present) ===
Ganaste took full ownership on June 1, 2008, and promptly renamed the property as the Lucky Club Casino and Hotel. An electrical fire occurred one week after the ownership change, forcing the casino to close for two weeks while critical equipment was repaired. As of 2017, the casino featured 11,953 sq ft (1,110.5 m^{2}) of gaming space.

The property's ownership group was later known as Lucky Silver Gaming, and has since been renamed Fifth Street Gaming. In 2018, the property was listed for sale with an asking price of $13 million, but it was not sold.

The Lucky Club was popular among local Latinos. Seeking to cater primarily to this demographic, Fifth Street announced plans in April 2022 to renovate and rebrand the property, with an Ojos Locos sports bar and restaurant as the focal point. The property opened as Ojos Locos Sports Cantina y Casino on February 6, 2023. It was the first Nevada location for Ojos Locos, and the first to include a casino. The 90-room hotel was also renovated and renamed Hotel Jefe.
