= Café con piernas =

Coffee shop style popular in Chile

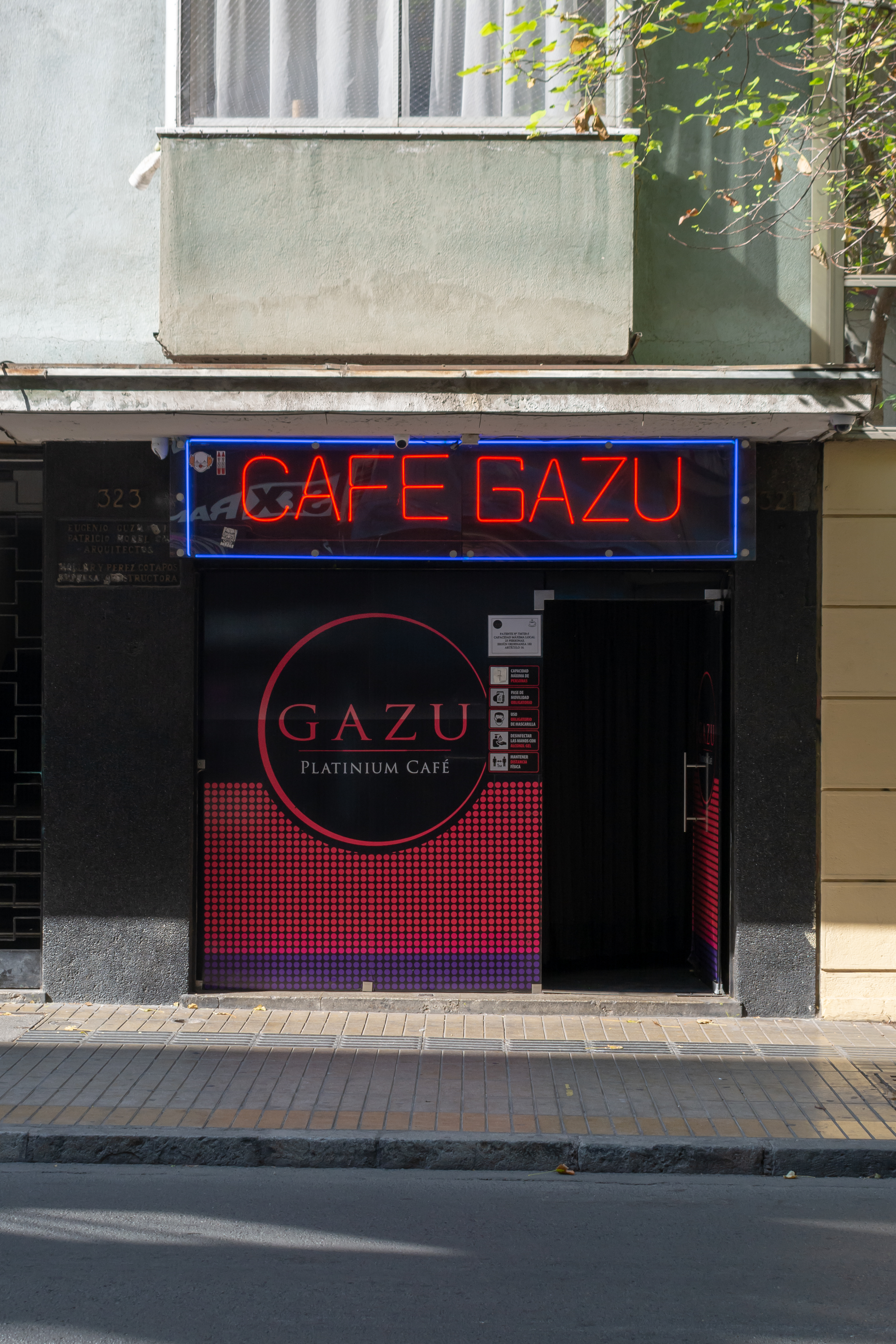
Front of Café Gazú, café con piernas in Santiago de Chile

Café con piernas (Spanish for "coffee with legs") is a coffee shop style popular in Chile where the service staff are attractive women dressed in revealing clothing. Coffee shops with waitresses serving in miniskirts and heels to businessmen had long been popular, but bikinis and similar attire accelerated the trend by the mid-1990s. The shops are very numerous and popular in Santiago. It is frequently noted that the shops seem to contradict the traditionally conservative culture of Chile.

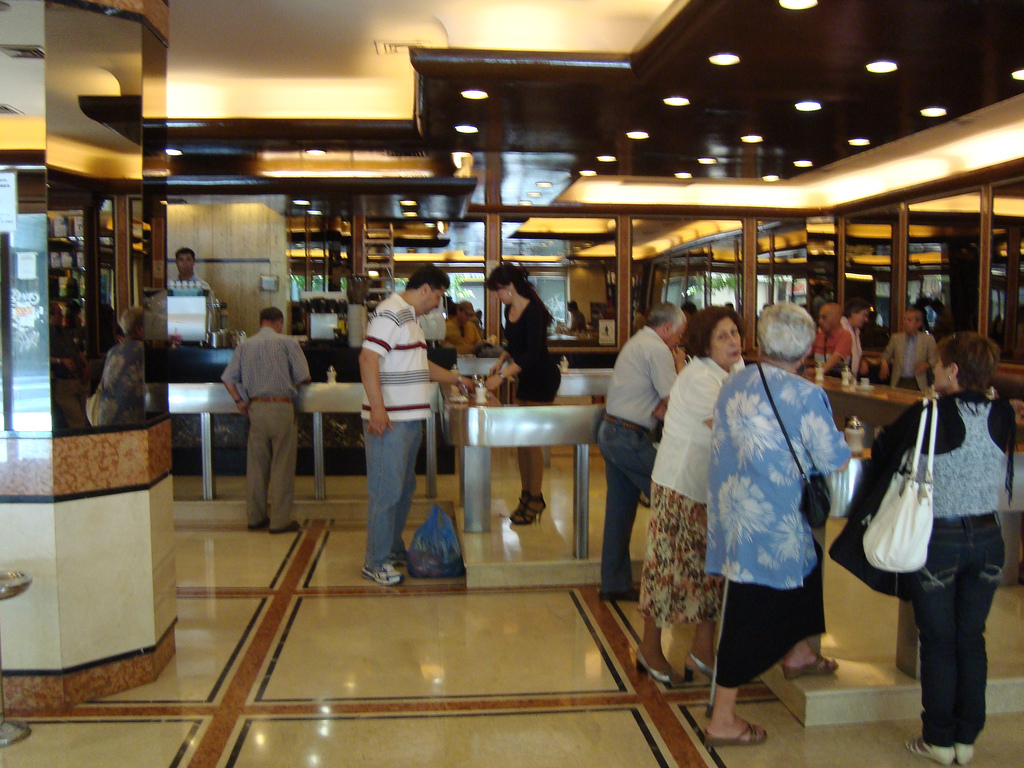
A more conservative café con piernas in Santiago, December 2010

Generally, the women walk on a raised catwalk behind the bar so as to maximize the view for patrons. In establishments at street level, the waitresses wear short skirts and high heels. At those in underground shopping centres, where the staff wear swimwear, they are mostly migrants from other countries and often lack the paperwork needed to allow them to work legally. The cafes have been subject to allegations of prostitution and workplace harassment. In response, numerous Santiago mayors have passed ordinances restricting the operations of the cafes, requiring them only to open during the daytime, not to sell alcohol, and to have their windows tinted.

== See also ==
- Bikini barista (similar phenomenon in the northwestern United States)
- Betel nut beauty (Taiwan)
- Host and hostess clubs, Maid café, and No-pan kissa (Japan)
- Breastaurant
