= Bikinis Sports Bar & Grill =

Chain of sports bars and restaurants

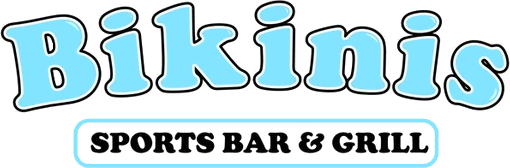
- Type: Private
- Industry: Restaurant franchise
- Founded: 2006; 20 years ago in Austin, Texas, US
- Founder: Doug Guller
- Defunct: December 23, 2018; 7 years ago
- Fate: Closure / Austin location rebranded as conventional sports bar
- Successor: BBG's (Burgers, Beer and Games)
- Headquarters: Austin, Texas, United States
- Number of locations: 14 at peak (2014)
- Areas served: Texas, Oklahoma
- Key people: Doug Guller
- Services: Food and beverage
- Parent: ATX Brands
- Website: Archived 2014-05-03 at the Wayback Machine

Bikinis Sports Bar & Grill was a chain of sports bars and restaurants located in Texas. The restaurant chain was known for its scantily-clad waitresses, called "Bikini Babes", whose uniforms consist of its eponymous bikini tops, cowboy boots, and tight denim shorts. The chain was also known for trademarking the term "breastaurant" (a common term for this and similar restaurants) and purchasing a ghost town that was temporarily renamed "Bikinis, Texas". The chain ceased operations on December 23, 2018.

== History ==
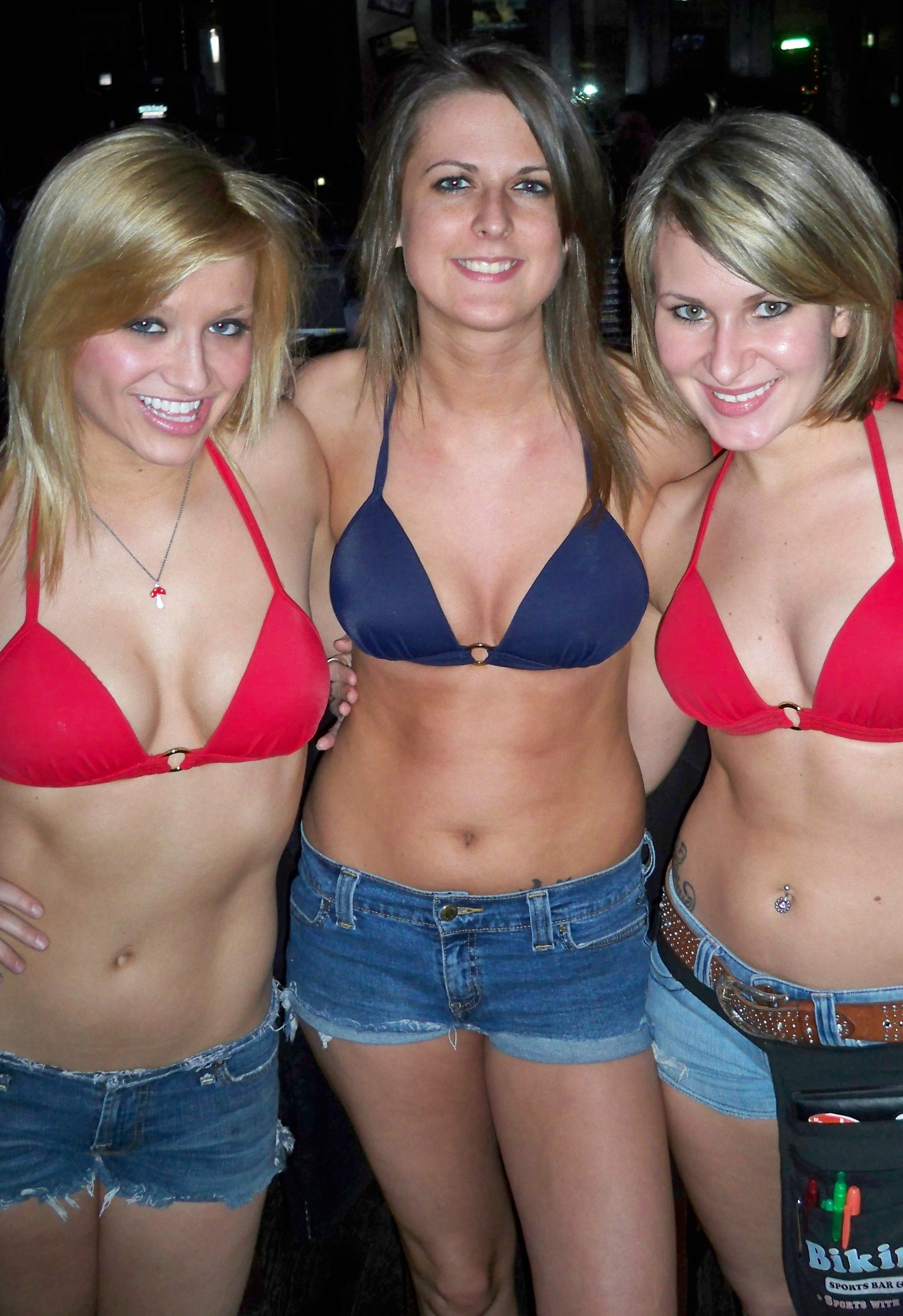
Bikinis waitresses wearing the standard uniform of bikini top and jeans shorts (2010)

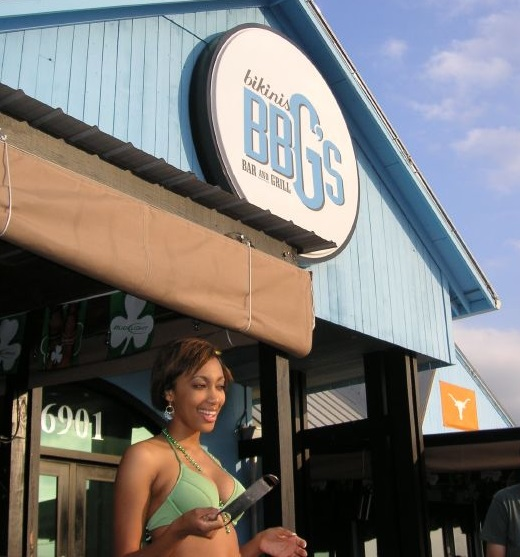
Exterior view of the Austin, Texas, Bikinis (2007)

Restaurant founder Doug Guller reports having gotten the idea for Bikinis Sports Bar & Grill in 2001 on an Australian vacation after being offered a beer by an attractive waitress while watching rugby. Guller theorized that a combination of sports, beer, and sex appeal would be particularly recession-proof. The first restaurant was opened in Austin in 2006; a total of 14 locations have subsequently opened, all of which are now closed. Most of the locations were in the Interstate 35 corridor in Texas (San Antonio).

The CBS TV show Undercover Boss featured Bikinis Sports Bar and Grill, airing on December 28, 2014. The show featured Guller posing undercover. He interacted with a bartender who said she normally wears a bikini top but felt uncomfortable wearing that on camera, so she opted to wear a T-shirt. He felt she was overserving an intoxicated patron. Not knowing that Guller was the CEO, she was candid about not being interested in the job as a career. The lack of enthusiasm ultimately led Guller to firing her on camera. A waitress with a good attitude was rewarded with breast augmentation surgery. These scenes provoked controversy on social media, especially on the Bikinis Facebook pages and on Twitter.

Since May 2015, the Bikinis located in the Dallas–Fort Worth metroplex (DFW), which was featured on Undercover Boss, had been in the process of being rebranded by ATX Brands as Gino's East Pizzerias. This would make DFW the second populated metropolitan statistical area in Texas (besides Houston and San Antonio) to lose its Bikinis restaurants. DFW locations Arlington and Richardson have been shuttered since February 11, 2015, with the Mesquite location following suit after April 15, 2015. The Austin location ceased operations on December 23, 2018.

== Marketing ==
Bikinis Sports Bar & Grill utilized a marketing campaign which has included several high-profile publicity stunts. The restaurant chain had a loyalty program formerly known as the Bikinis Black Card where patrons earned points for rewards. Patrons who had over 1000 points on their black card account would judge one of their in-store bikini contests. During the opening of Bikinis, Texas in July 2013, Black Card account holders also got a chance to meet Carmen Electra in person.

The restaurant chain hosted a monthly bikini contest. Some of the contests were seasonal until February 2014 when the company began phasing out the contests based on the ratio of active waitstaff who would sign up and enter in lieu of the newly established Miss Bikinis USA Pageant.

=== Bikinis, Texas ===
In 2012, Guller purchased the ghost town of Bankersmith saying that he would rename the town to "Bikinis, Texas" after his restaurant chain. Guller said he would turn the town into a tourist destination with the creation of a bikini hall of fame which described the swimwear's history. No plans were made to open a Bikinis Sports Bar & Grill restaurant at the location, but Guller suggested that a bar inside an abandoned bus could be possible.

A "grand opening" of Bikinis, Texas was scheduled for July 13, 2013. Country musician Jerry Jeff Walker was to perform and Carmen Electra was present to be inducted to the bikini hall of fame. Other events which have been planned to be associated with the town include a "Miss Bikinis USA" pageant and a possible reality show. Bikinis, Texas was reverted to its previous name of Bankersmith in 2015, reportedly in an effort from Guller to mend fences with residents of nearby Fredericksburg, who were reportedly upset with the name change. As of January 2017, Bankersmith is up for sale.

=== "Breastaurant" trademark ===
In September 2011, Bikinis Sports Bar & Grill filed a request with a United States Patent and Trademark Office to register the term "breastaurant". The term was successfully registered in October 2012 and was marked by the trademark office as "Un-Revivable" on May 24, 2019. The Huffington Post suggested that the trademarking of "breastaurant" was a consequence of the boom in breastaurant sales figures in the early 2010s.
