= MTR Gaming Group =

- Formerly: Secamur Corporation (1988–1989); Excalibur Security Services (1989–1991); Excalibur Holding Corporation (1991–1993); Winners Entertainment (1993–1996)
- Company type: Public
- Industry: Entertainment & Hospitality
- Founded: March 7, 1988; 38 years ago Wilmington, Delaware, U.S.
- Defunct: September 19, 2014; 11 years ago
- Successor: Eldorado Resorts
- Headquarters: Chester, West Virginia, U.S.

MTR Gaming Group was an American gambling company based in Chester, West Virginia that operated horse racing tracks and racinos.It was formed on March 7, 1988, in Wilmington, Delaware. On September 19, 2014, it merged with Eldorado Holdco LLC, forming Eldorado Resorts in Reno, Nevada.

== Properties ==
The properties owned and operated by MTR Gaming at the time of its acquisition were:

- Mountaineer Casino, Racetrack and Resort – Chester, West Virginia
- Presque Isle Downs and Casino – Summit Township, Erie County, Pennsylvania
- Scioto Downs Racino – Columbus, Ohio

== Former ==
Properties previously owned by the company include:

- Binion's Gambling Hall and Hotel – Las Vegas, Nevada – Acquired from Harrah's Entertainment in 2005, sold to TLC Entertprises in 2008
- Jackson Harness Raceway – Jackson, Michigan – Closed in 2008
- The Ramada Inn and Speedway Casino – North Las Vegas, Nevada – Sold to Ganaste in 2008.
