= WingHouse Bar & Grill =

American restaurant chain

- Type: Private (franchise)
- Industry: Food Service
- Founded: 1994 in Largo, FL
- Founder: Ed Burnett
- Headquarters: Orlando, Florida
- Number of locations: 19
- Key people: Ed Burnett - Founder/Creator and Crawford Ker - Investor/Owner
- Products: Wings, Burgers, Sandwiches, Alcohol
- Revenue: $60 million (2008)
- Number of employees: 1,700
- Parent: ARC Group Inc.

WingHouse Bar & Grill, formerly known as Ker's WingHouse Bar & Grill, is a restaurant chain based in Florida. It was created and founded by Ed Burnett, with financial support for expansion provided by investor and former National Football League player Crawford Ker. The establishment is known for employing the "breastaurant" concept, featuring servers known as "WingHouse Girls".

== History ==
Burnett transformed a closed restaurant, "Knockers", into "The WingHouse" in Largo, Florida, after acquiring its rights.

In 1994, Burnett partnered with investor Crawford Ker to expand the restaurant into a chain. The initial objective was to establish 20 to 50 locations and eventually sell the chain to a larger restaurant chain or investors. Between 1994 and 1997, two additional WingHouse locations opened in the Tampa Bay area.

In late 2004 Hooters sued the restaurant for trademark violations regarding their uniforms and decor. After a three-week trial, the jury ruled that no trademark infringement existed. Hooters appealed the decision, but in June 2006, the 11th U.S. Circuit Court of Appeals in Atlanta upheld the verdict and ultimately Ker won a $1.2-million jury award from Hooters.

As of 2007, the company had 1,700 employees at 22 locations with revenue of nearly $60 million. The company won first place in the "traditional x-hot sauce" category of the 2007 National Buffalo Wing Festival.

On June 4, 2008, the company announced a franchise program. In mid-2008, the chain operated 19 locations in Florida and Texas. The initial focus was for franchises in the Southeastern US.

From 2014 to 2019, Soaring Wings LLC owned the company; however, as of 2021, this entity is inactive.

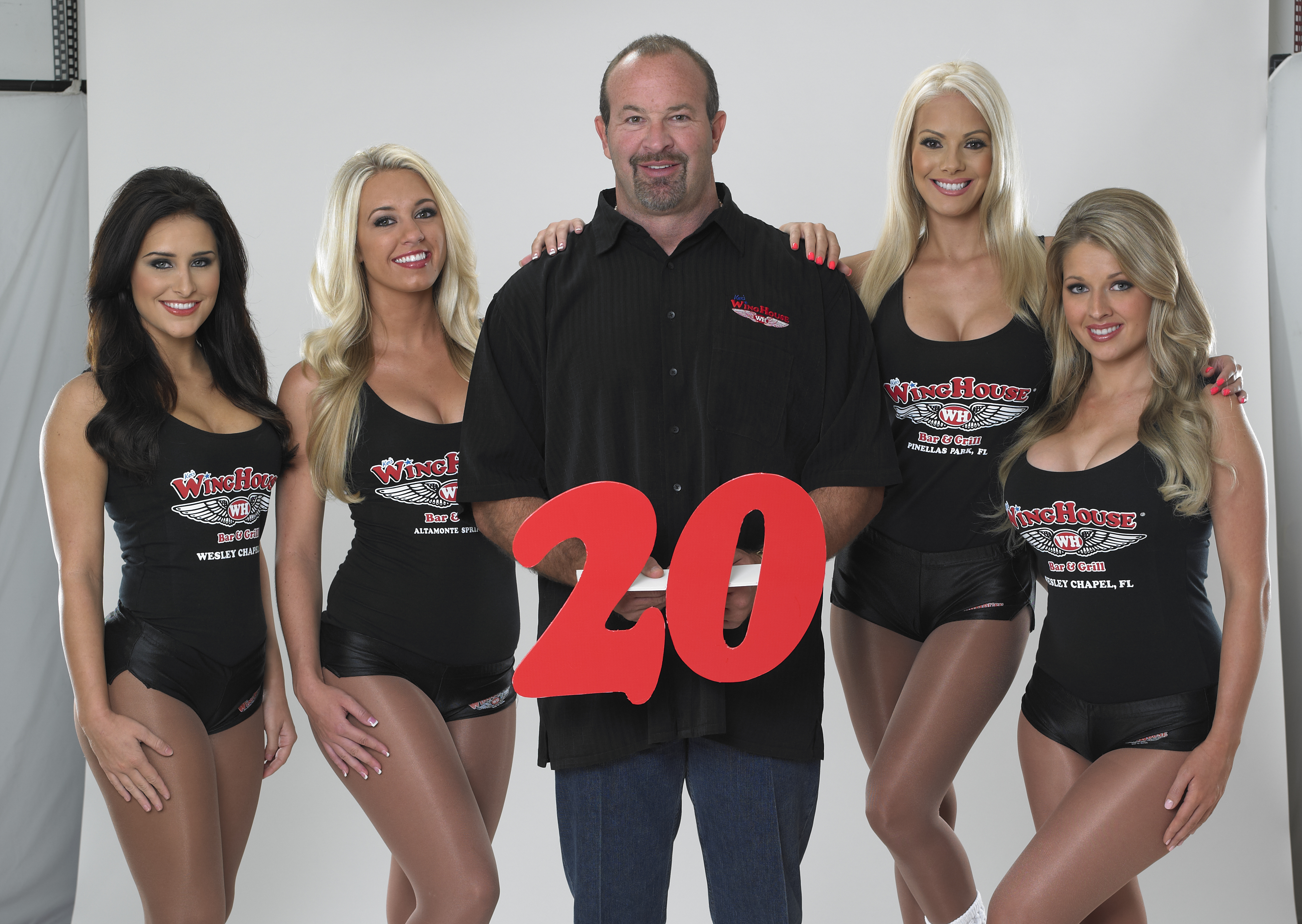
Crawford Ker and "WingHouse Girls" in 2013

WingHouses have a bar, sports memorabilia decor, and in some locations, a game room.
