= Ojos Locos =

American restaurant chain

- Type: Private
- Industry: Restaurant
- Number of locations: 33
- Area served: Texas and Southwestern United States
- Products: Mexican food, Southwest food, alcohol, beer
- Services: Food and beverage
- Website: ojoslocos.com

Ojos Locos Sports Cantina is a chain of Mexican-themed sports bars and restaurants based in Dallas, Texas, and having locations throughout the American Southwest. The chain is known for its waitresses (called "chicas") who wear cleavage- and midriff-revealing uniforms, leading to its colloquial designation as a breastaurant. It is often nicknamed the “Mexican Hooters”.

== History and concept ==
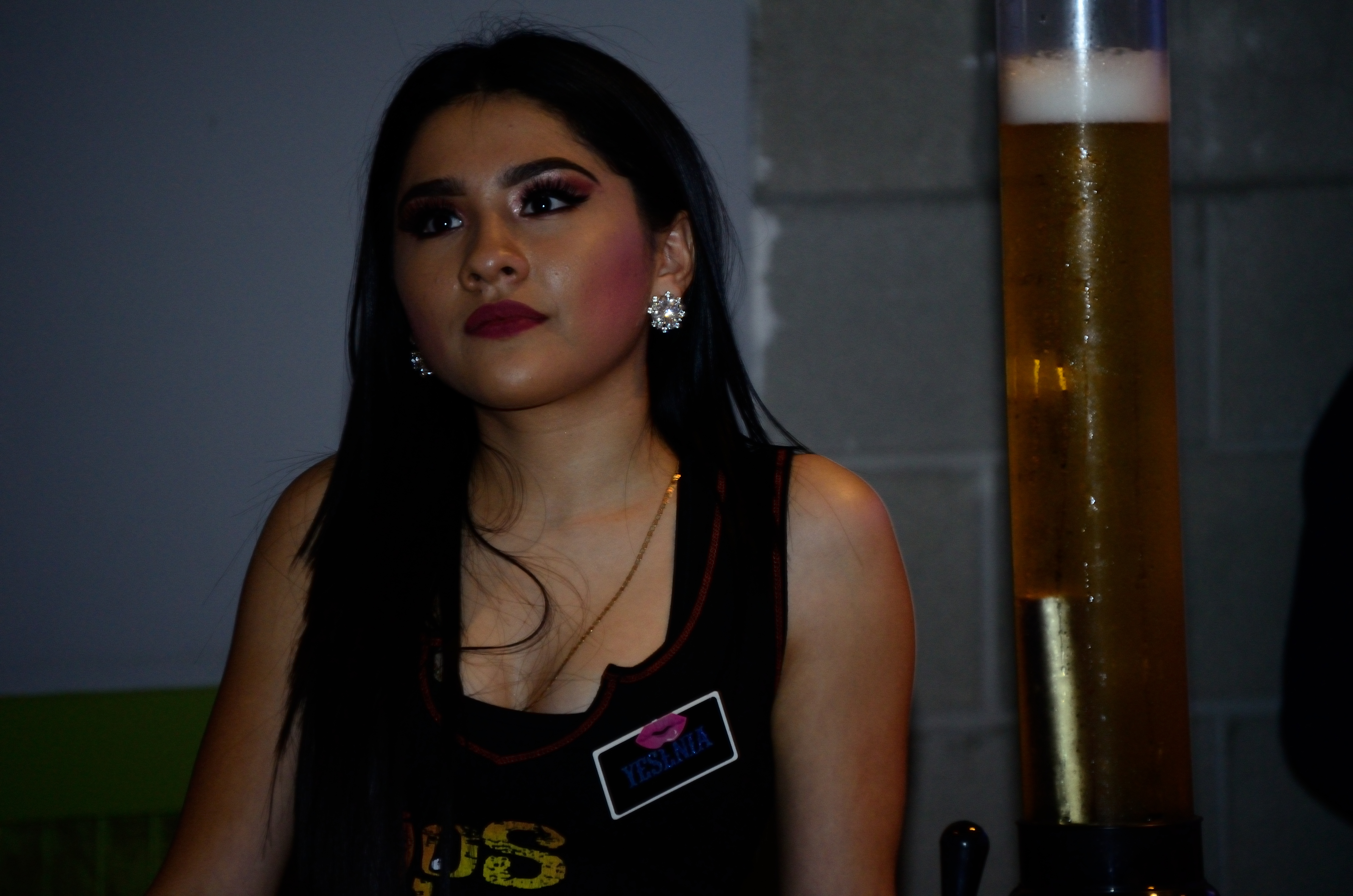
Ojos Locos waitress with "balone" pitcher in foreground (2016)

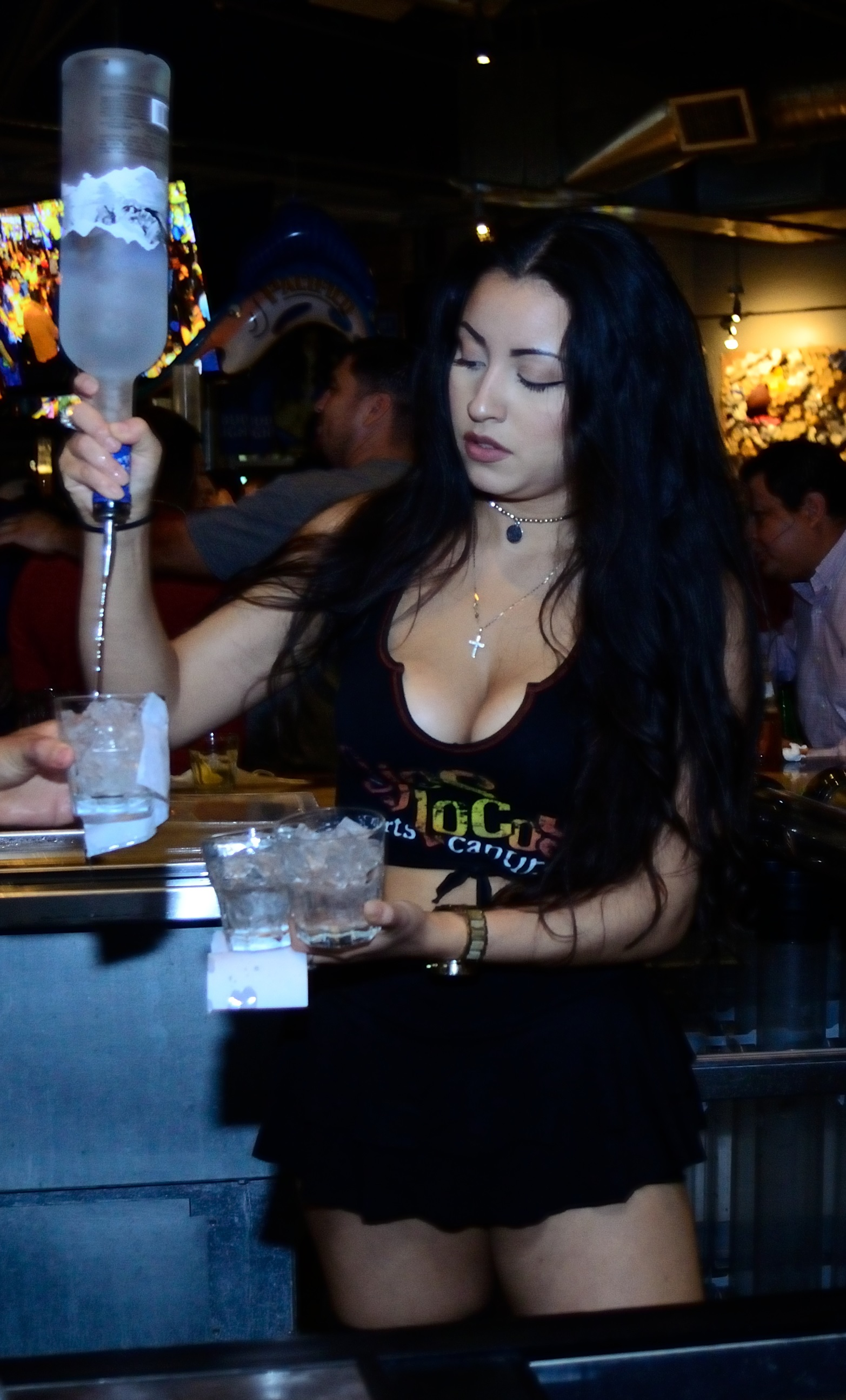
Ojos Locos waitress wearing official uniform (2016)

Ojos Locos (pronounced [ˈo.xos ˈlo.kos], Spanish for "Crazy Eyes") was founded in 2010 by restaurateurs Randy DeWitt, Jack Gibbons, Rich Hicks, and Todd East. DeWitt, the owner of parent company Front Burner Restaurants, had previously founded Twin Peaks, a chain of wilderness lodge-themed breastaurants, in 2005. The 2010 opening of the first Ojos Locos restaurant in Dallas coincided closely with the 2010 FIFA World Cup and the chain has consistently emphasized soccer as a principal sport to watch at its locations.

Ojos Locos has been called a "Mexican Hooters" or "Twin Peaks for a Hispanic customer base" and markets itself to working class Hispanic men. Workers at the chain frequently speak both Spanish and English; The New York Times has singled out the restaurant as an example of an establishment that has thrived even during an anti-Spanish-language political environment. D Magazine cited it as being the best sports bar in Dallas in 2013.

The servers at Ojos Locos are known as "chicas" and wear short skirts along with cleavage and midriff-baring outfits, leading the chain to colloquially be referred to as a "breastaurant". The food served is a mix of Mexican and Southwestern American food developed by chef John Franke, with tacos being a particular specialty. They are also known for their tall beer pitchers called "balones" that contain 100 US fluid ounces (3.0 L). As of 2020, there were thirteen locations across Texas, Arizona, and New Mexico. As with their sister chain, Twin Peaks, they promote the 29 °F (−2 °C) temperature of their beer, which is the coldest temperature possible before ice crystals begin to form in the beer they serve. Ojos Locos restaurants feature numerous large screen televisions (including one in each booth) showing Spanish-language sports broadcasts (especially soccer, boxing, and UFC matches).
