= Red Envelope Club =

Taiwanese cabaret style

Coordinates: 25°2′36.19″N 121°30′23.04″E

Entrance to a Red Envelope Club in Ximending, Taipei

A Red Envelope Club (Chinese: 紅包場; pinyin: hóngbāocháng) is a form of cabaret in Taiwan that originated in Taipei in the 1960s as an imitation of Shanghai Cabaret. In these cabarets, female singers sing old Chinese songs from the 1920s to 1950s to mostly older men, many of whom were soldiers in General Chiang Kai-shek's Kuomintang army that fled mainland China after the Chinese Civil War. The cabarets get their name from the fact that the audience gives the singers, who they appreciate, money in red envelopes. The remaining clubs are mostly located in the Ximending District of Taipei on Hankou Street, Emei Street, and Xining South Road.

== See also ==
- Military dependents' village
- Mainlanders
- Betel nut beauty
