= Betel nut beauty =

Female roadside sellers of betel nuts and cigarettes in Taiwan

- Traditional Chinese: 檳榔西施
- Simplified Chinese: 槟榔西施
Transcriptions
Standard Mandarin
- Hanyu Pinyin: bīnláng xīshī
- Wade–Giles: pin^{1}-lang^{2} hsi^{1}-shih^{1}
Southern Min
- Hokkien POJ: pin-nn̂g se-si/pin-nn̂g sai-si

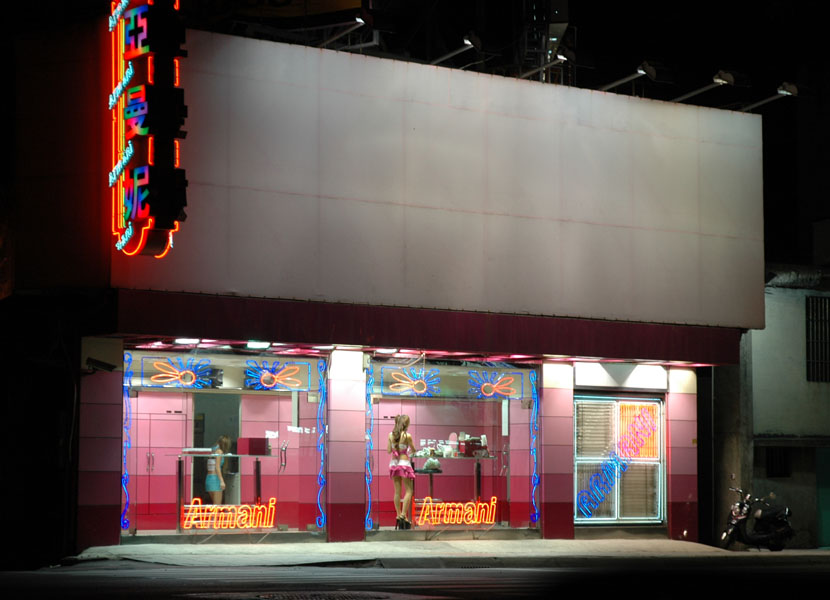
A highly decorated betel nut kiosk along the main street near a freeway intersection

In Taiwan, a betel nut beauty or binlang girl (Chinese: 檳榔西施; pinyin: bīnláng xīshī; Pe̍h-ōe-jī: pin-nn̂g se-si) is a young woman selling betel nuts and cigarettes from a brightly lit glass enclosure while wearing revealing clothing. The term in Chinese comes from Xi Shi, the legendary beauty of imperial China's Spring and Autumn period. Though betel nut chewing is practiced in many regions in Southeast Asia, the betel nut beauty phenomenon is distinctly Taiwanese.

The original betel nut beauties were the "Shuangdong Girls" who, in the 1960s, brought glamour to the opening of the Shuangdong Betel Nut Stand in Guoxing, Nantou. The success of the marketing strategy led competitors to follow suit, and by the end of the century, betel nut stands topped with neon signs became a common feature of Taiwan. The stands appear in urban, suburban and rural settings alike.

As icons of Taiwanese culture, betel nut beauties appear frequently in art and film, notably the 2001 movie Betelnut Beauty and the 2007 art film Help Me, Eros. In 2016, director Tony Xue released Betelnut Girls, with lead actors Peggy Tseng and Paul Hsu. In the 2025 Taiwanese film Left-Handed Girl, one of the lead characters works at a betel nut stand.

== Definition and distribution ==
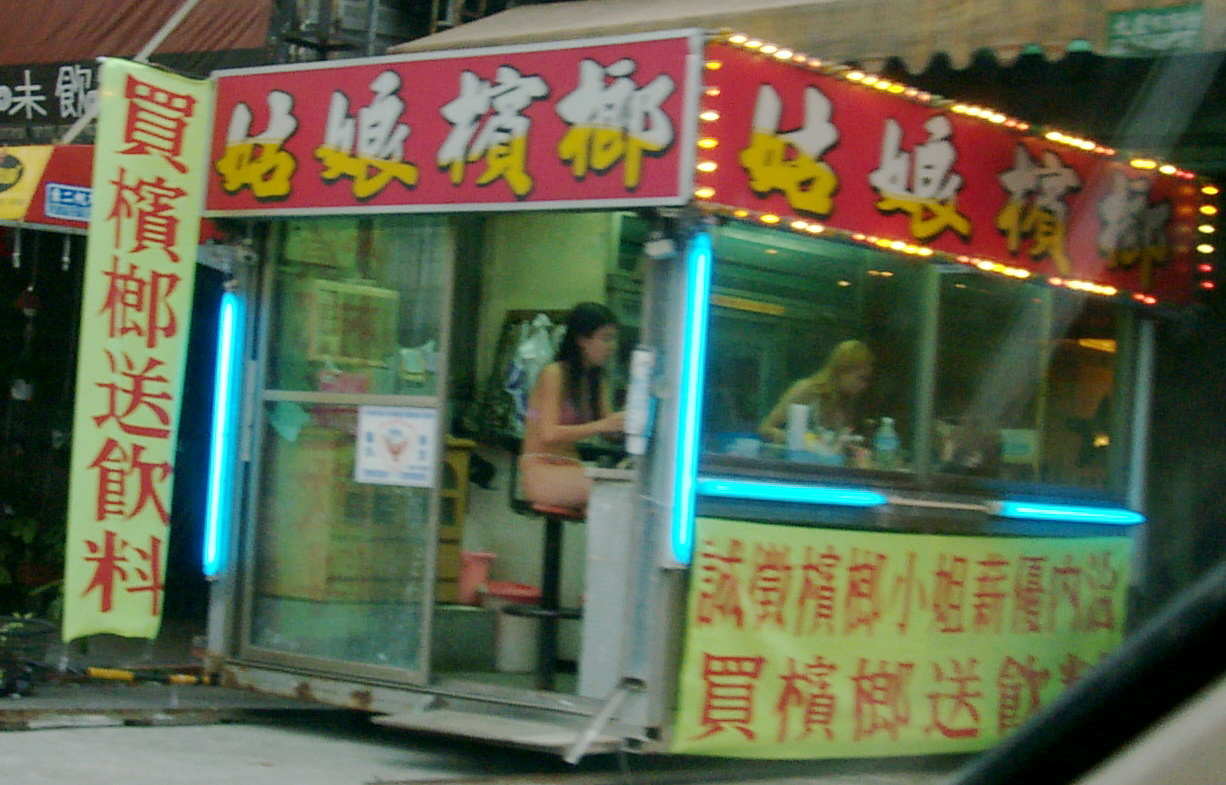
Betel nut beauty

In a general sense, a betel nut beauty is any female betel nut saleswoman wearing seductive clothing.

Flamboyant betel nut stands decorated with flashing neon signs are a common sight on many major roads in Taiwan. Their primary target consumers are mostly truckers and other working-class people. Some shop owners started to hire girls dressed in revealing outfits to grab customers' attention, and rivals followed suit.

Apart from being scantily clothed, some betel nut beauties also offered "drive-through" sex services for their customers. For an extra charge, a betel nut beauty would enter a customer's car and perform oral sex on them.

Aside from the fear that these practices would generate crime, the presence of betel nut beauties is said to also distract drivers and cause more car accidents.

== Taiwanese betel nut culture ==
The betel nut, also known as the areca nut, is the seed of Areca catechu, the betel palm. This tree, like the coconut palm (Cocos nucifera), belongs to the Arecaceae family. The betel palm is an evergreen tree whose trunk can grow to a height of up to 20 metres (66 ft). The word binlang is derived from the Indonesian word for the nut, pinang. The betel nut was once used primarily as a herbal remedy, although in modern times it is mostly taken for its stimulant properties.

Betel nut chewing is a widespread practice in Taiwan, first introduced to the majority Han population by the native Taiwanese indigenous peoples. It is estimated that over a hundred billion New Taiwan dollars are spent annually on this product which has the colloquial name of "Taiwanese chewing gum". Frequent users are often called the "red-lip clan", since the residue often stains the lips and gums. According to the government's Council of Agriculture, around seventy farms have joined this lucrative industry by planting betel nut trees, which has made the betel nut the most economically important crop in Taiwan since the 1990s. However, the increase in betel nut planting has caused problems with soil and water conservation on the hillside land. It has also been found that the Taiwanese method of consuming betel nut significantly enhances its potential to cause cancer.

== Controversy ==
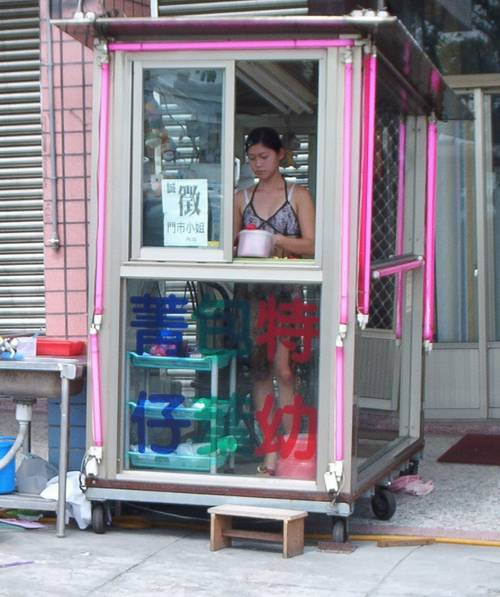
A betel nut beauty

Controversy surrounding betel nut beauties generally centers on two questions:

1. the propriety of their revealing dress in public places
2. whether their dress marks them as victims of exploitation

Betel nut beauties often come from agricultural and working-class sectors of Taiwanese society. This has led some critics to regard their revealing dress as a sign of exploitation. Other observers, such as Josephine Ho, coordinator of the Center for the Study of Sexuality at National Central University, see betel nut beauties as self-empowering: young women with few resources who better their economic situation by employing a marketing technique that requires confidence.

== Suppression ==
In 2002, local governments in Taiwan started to impose laws or regulations covering the dress code of betel nut beauties, prohibiting the wearing of over-revealing clothes. Taipei was the first to initiate the change.

On 17 September 2002, Taoyuan County (now Taoyuan City) implemented a "three nos" policy which prevented betel nut beauties from wearing outfits which exposed their bellies, breasts, and buttocks. The policy sparked backlash from those operating in the industry and resulted in groups protesting in front of the Taoyuan County Hall.

Regulations were also imposed in Taichung, Tainan, and Kaohsiung.

Some betel nut beauties are high school dropouts and their jobs represent the principal source of income for their families. Most have difficulty finding a job in a convenience store because they lack an educational qualification or because of age restrictions; some choose this work for its higher pay.

== See also ==
- Areca nut
- Areca catechu
- Bikini barista
- Café con piernas
- Hooters
- No-pan kissa
- Red Envelope Club
