= Twin Peaks (restaurant chain) =

American chain of sports bars and restaurants

Twin Peaks Restaurants, LP.

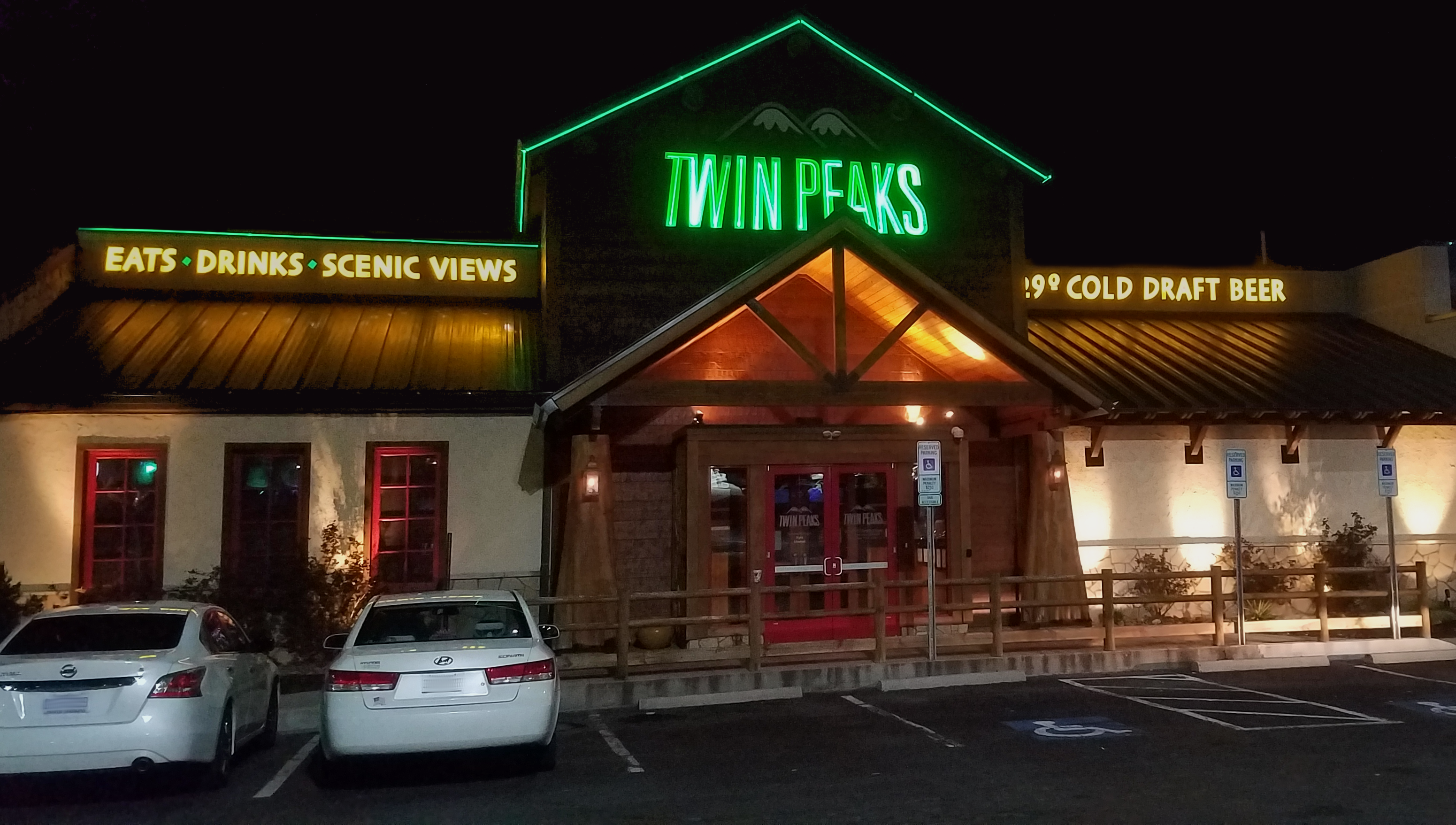
- A Twin Peaks in Winston-Salem, North Carolina at night (2019)
- Type: Private
- Industry: Restaurant; sports bar
- Genre: Casual dining
- Founded: 2005; 21 years ago Lewisville, Texas
- Founders: Randy Dewitt; Scott Gordon
- Headquarters: Addison, Texas, U.S.
- Number of locations: 115 (June 2026)
- Area served: United States; Mexico
- Key people: Roger Gondek (COO)
- Products: Southwest food, American food, alcohol, beer
- Services: Franchising
- Revenue: US$338 million (2019)
- Number of employees: 5,000
- Website: TwinPeaksRestaurants.com

Twin Peaks is an American chain of sports bars and restaurants based in Lewisville, Texas, which has been described as an "ultimate sports lodge" and breastaurant. The chain is known for having its waitresses, primarily young women and typically referred to as "Twin Peaks Girls", dress in revealing uniforms that consist of cleavage- and midriff-revealing red plaid tops, as well as khaki shorts or denim short shorts. At other times, waitresses wear revealing seasonal or themed outfits. Restaurants are decorated in the theme of a wilderness lodge and serve a mix of American, Southwest and Southern cuisines as well as alcohol. The chain's slogan is "Eats. Drinks. Scenic Views."

== History ==
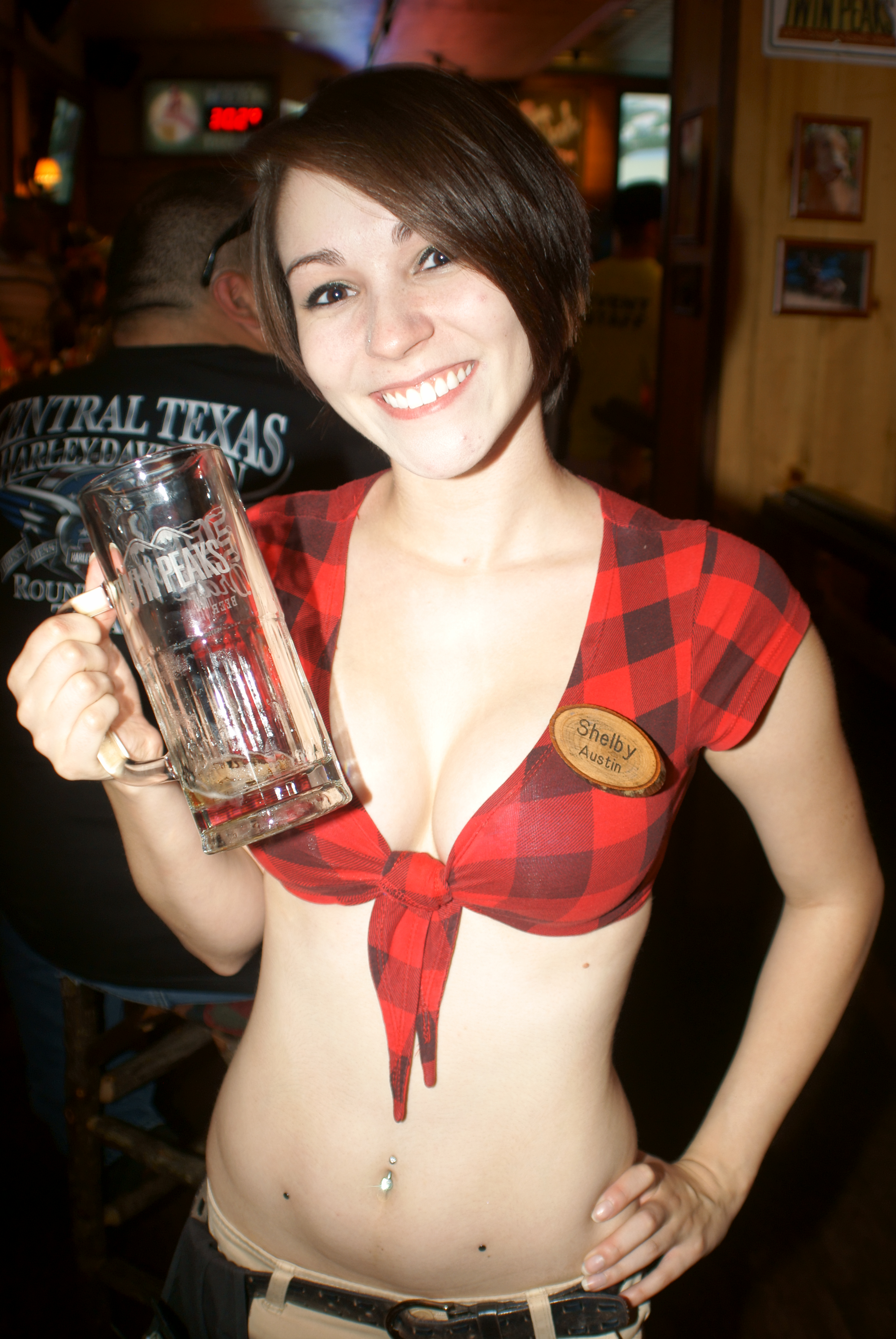
A Twin Peaks Girl wearing official red plaid uniform (2012)

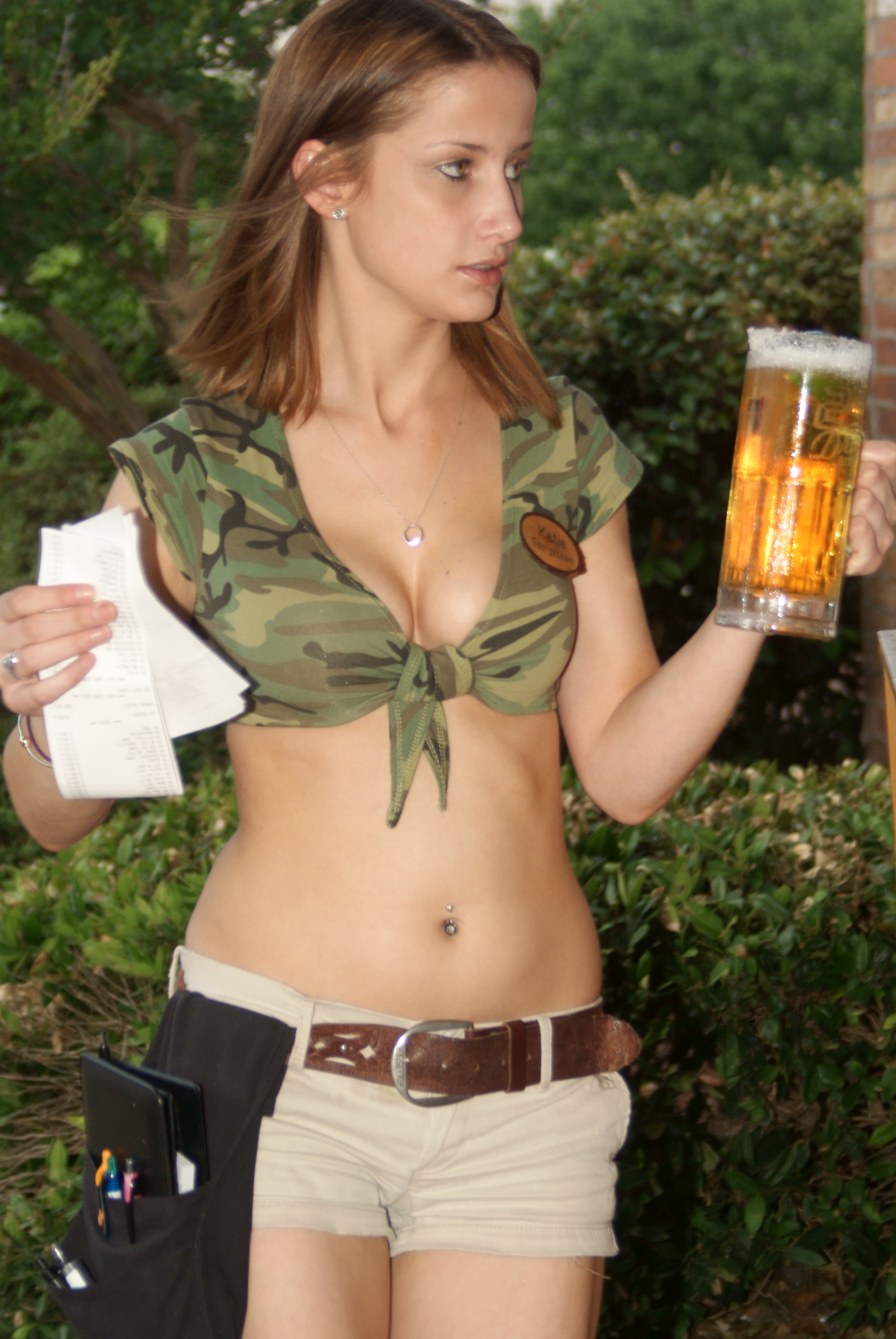
A Twin Peaks Girl wearing special event uniform (2012)

Twin Peaks was founded in 2005 by Randy Dewitt and Scott Gordon in Lewisville, Texas. Dewitt, who had previously helped Brinker International develop Rockfish Seafood, noted a thriving sports-bar market and decided to create a chain with a mountain-lodge motif and attractive servers. According to analysts, 'breastaurant' chains have been growing at a rate of 30-40% per year, while the general restaurant industry as a whole has only grown about 3-5% annually.

By August 2013, Twin Peaks had expanded to 38 locations across 17 states in the United States. Most locations are in Texas, with others in the American Southwest, Midwest and South. Twin Peaks has a mix of franchised and corporate-owned restaurants.

In 2014, Bloomberg recognized Twin Peaks as "one of the nation’s fastest-growing restaurant chains".

By August 2018, Twin Peaks had 84 locations, 54 franchised, 30 company operated, and sales of $322 million with the 85th Twin Peaks opening in Toledo, Ohio.

Twin Peaks plans to open 10 to 12 restaurants in 2021, after reporting strong profit during the COVID-19 pandemic.

On September 1, 2020, Twin Peaks announced that it would be acquired by FAT Brands, owner of Fatburger and Johnny Rockets, for $300 million. The acquisition was completed on October 1.

On January 26, 2026, parent company FAT Brands filed for Chapter 11 bankruptcy protection in an effort to shed billions of dollars in debt. The company listed assets and liabilities between $1 billion and $10 billion.

On June 15, 2026, Twin Peaks announced it had emerged from the Chapter 11 process. Summit Acquisitions, LLC, a group made up of three of the company's franchisees, has assumed a strategic advisory role on behalf of the company's bondholders. Twin Peaks is no longer associated with FAT Brands and has returned to its previous status as a privately-held company.

As of June 2026, the company has 115 locations, having recently opened a new lodge in Omaha, NE, with another set to open in Kissimmee, FL in late June. They also have secured signed development agreements with operators to bring Twin Peaks to Connecticut (via New London Hospitality) and another agreement that will see several new lodges in South Texas, including Brownsville, South Padre Island, and Laredo, TX. There is also plans for international expansion as Twin Peaks was a common restaurant visited by tourists during the 2026 FIFA World Cup.

== Awards ==
- Twin Peaks won a 2010 Hot Concept award from Nation's Restaurant News.
- In 2011, Twin Peaks was named "Franchisee of the Year" by the International Franchise Association at their annual conference in Washington, D.C.
- Twin Peaks was named number 1 in Knapp Track for comp sales in 2017 among all casual dining brands.
- In 2017, Twin Peaks was named a winner in the Enterprise Innovator category at the 2017 MURTEC (Multi-Unit Restaurant Technology Conference).
- In 2018, Twin Peaks was ranked number 196 on the Franchise Times top 200 list.

== Lawsuits ==
In November 2010, the parent company of Twin Peaks (Twin Restaurant IP LLC) accused Kevin Laughlin, the owner of Grand Tetons LLC DBA Northern Exposure, of trademark infringement. The lawsuit sought to prevent the opening of Northern Exposure's Fayetteville, Arkansas location after one of Twin Peaks' franchisee noticed a billboard similar to Twin Peaks but advertising Northern Exposure. The lawsuit was settled in the spring of 2011, with Laughlin paying Twin Peaks' legal fees related to the lawsuit.

In July 2011, former Hooters executives including CEO and president Coby Brooks, CLO Clay Mingus, Joseph Hummel, Jim Tessmer, Roger Gondek, and the business administrator for the late Robert H. Brooks (founder of Hooters) Patti Frederick left Hooters and formed La Cima Restaurants LLC, a Twin Peaks franchisee. Hooters of America then filed suit against La Cima Restaurants and Joseph Hummel alleging Hummel had electronically sent "more than 500 pages" of Hooters' trade secrets to his private email weeks before he resigned. On May 1, 2012 the Atlanta Business Chronicle reported that Hooters had settled the lawsuit against La Cima and Hummel, with the terms that La Cima and Hummel return or destroy all stolen documents and not use any information on those documents in a competitive manner.

On July 8, 2015, the widow of Jesus Delgado Rodriguez (one of the nine bikers killed in the 2015 Waco shootout) filed a lawsuit against Twin Peaks' parent company for negligence.

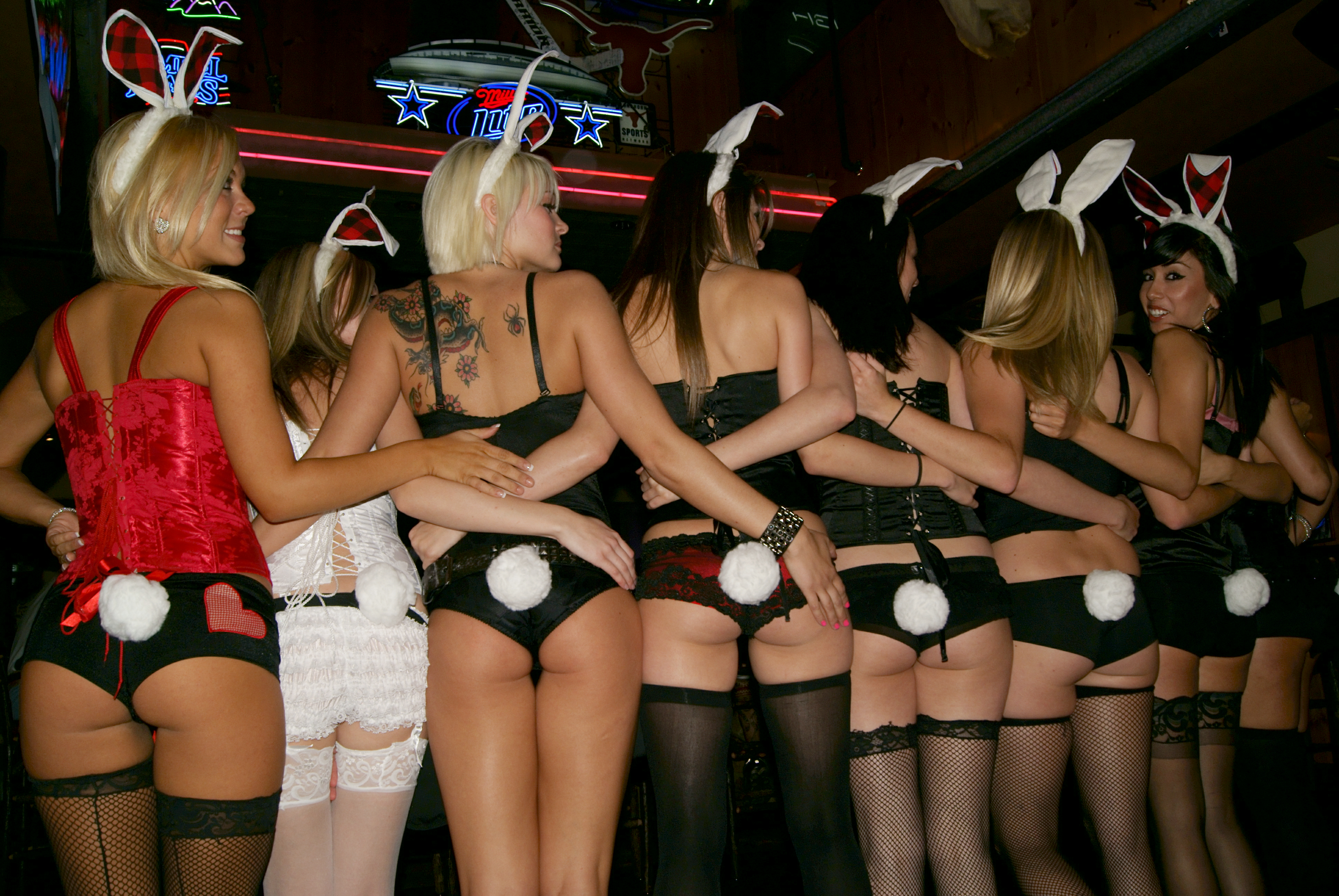
In 2020 waitresses sued the chain for requiring them to wear lingerie.

In April 2018, a group of waitresses and former waitresses sued the chain over its dress regulations, and informal extra requirements imposed on them. Their suit claimed the chain required them to maintain figures that were flattered by the very revealing uniforms they were required to wear. In addition restaurants expected waitresses to wear lingerie, or bikinis, during promotions where patrons celebrated special occasions, like Valentine's Day, or Easter. Waitresses alleged that they would be fired if they phoned in sick on shifts where lingerie was required. On August 7, 2020, the Chicago Tribune reported that 34 former employees filed a lawsuit for "sex discrimination and harassment". The lawsuit was settled.

== Waco, Texas gunfight ==
On May 17, 2015, a gunfight among rival biker gangs broke out at a Waco, Texas, Twin Peaks restaurant. Nine people were killed and eighteen others were taken to the hospital. A police spokesman expressed anger at the management of the local Twin Peaks, which he said had been less than helpful in dealing with gangs in the past. The next day, the Texas Alcoholic Beverage Commission announced a seven-day suspension of the location's liquor license. Hours later, corporate headquarters announced that it was revoking the location's franchise agreement, saying the location's owner had disregarded warnings from both police and corporate officials in the run-up to the shootout. Later that day, corporate headquarters announced the Waco location would not reopen. The same franchisee also owned a Twin Peaks in Harker Heights, near Fort Hood, but it closed at the end of September 2015.

On April 2, 2019, all of the remaining criminal cases were dismissed.

== See also ==
- List of Texas companies (T)
