= Sociological Images =

Social science blog

- Website type: Blog
- Creators: Lisa Wade; Gwen Sharp
- Founder: Lisa Wade
- Website: thesocietypages.org/socimages/
- Launched: 2007

Sociological Images is a blog that offers image-based sociological commentary and is one of the most widely read social science blogs. Updated daily, it covers a wide range of social phenomena. The aim of the blog is to encourage readers to develop a "sociological imagination" and to learn to see how social institutions, interactions, and ideas affect the individual.

Started in 2007 by sociology professor Lisa Wade as a place to swap material for sociology classes, the site developed into a blog aimed at the general public as it attracted more readers. However, the site still includes a strong teaching component, including sample assignments and syllabi for sociology instructors. The site receives about 500,000 visitors per month, most from social media sites and other blogs, such as Jezebel, which partially syndicate it. Reviewers have praised the blog's ability to make sociology accessible to the general public.

== History ==
Sociological images was founded in 2007 by sociology professor Lisa Wade (Occidental College) and hosted at Blogspot to share ideas and teaching resources with other faculty teaching about sociology. Six professors were invited to serve as the foundational bloggers. Early posts included little text because it was assumed the audience would be academics and thus understand the context of the material. After a few months, Wade and Gwen Sharp (Nevada State College) by dint of being the main content producers took over the blog. While the writers did not originally envision a non-academic audience, the posts started to be shared amongst a large non-academic community, particularly through Facebook and Twitter in the later years of the blog. Wade and Sharp were very surprised to see their posts circulate beyond academics and, initially, a little unsettled to have non-academics commenting. However, seeing their audience grow, they were excited and reimagined the site as a blog devoted to public sociology. In 2008, the editors of Contexts, a magazine published by the American Sociological Association, asked Wade and Sharp if they would be interested in integrating their blog into the website of the magazine and they agreed. In 2010, the editors of the magazine retired but moved the website's content to The Society Pages along with Sociological Images. As Wade and Sharp put it in their history of the blog, "with the help of the technical staff at Contexts and the University of Minnesota-Twin Cities, Sociological Images became increasingly professional, functional, and multidimensional". Wade and Sharp have reflected that as a result of writing and publishing the blog they have become more media literate. For example, they no longer highlight CafePress tshirts, since anyone can put any slogan on one; instead, they choose to highlight influential images.

== Format and content ==
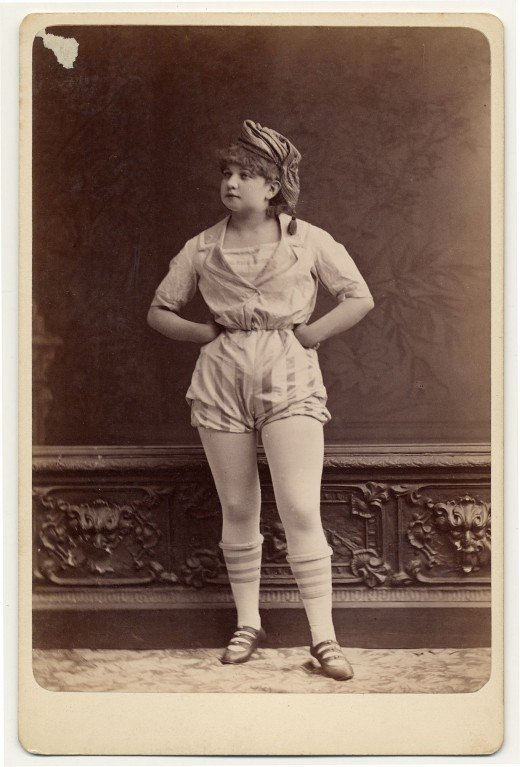
Body image is one of the topics at the center of Sociological Images' posts. In a post centering around a series of images of exotic dancers from the 1890s, for example, Wade discusses how thinness has been viewed as beautiful only at specific moments in history.

Hosted by The Society Pages, which is a hub for social science blogs and websites, Sociological Images is a blog that is updated daily and often between two and four times a day. The posts are written by Gwen Sharp, Lisa Wade and guest contributors. Each post usually features an image, such as a graph, advertisement, commercial, video clip, product, or screenshot, as well as commentary about the image; most of these images are taken from mainstream websites, other social science sites, or reader submissions. Around 50% of the blog posts focus on analyzing these visual elements of culture. The blog covers a wide variety of sociological topics, such as gender inequality, data mapping, homelessness, lesbian politics, and the environment. The most common topics are gender, sexuality, class, nationalism, race, ethnicity, marketing, and body image; in particular, the site focuses on how American popular culture perpetuates gender inequities. Many of the posts are based on items sent in by readers which Wade and Sharp then analyze; they receive an average of 15 to 20 items per day. According to Wade and Sharp, "involvement of the readership in this way has undoubtedly been key to the site's success; not only does it ensure a steady stream of content, but it creates a personal connection to the site and engages readers more actively in applying the sociological perspective as they look for relevant examples to submit". The site also collects popular posts under its "trending" tab, recommends posts under "editor's favorites", and references to posts in the media under "In the News". As of May 2012, the site had over 4,000 posts archived.

The tagline of the blog—"Inspiring sociological imaginations everywhere"—is taken from C. Wright Mills, a famous sociologist. As Wade explains, sociology for her is designed "to explain social patterns outside the individual" by looking at how culture and institutions affect individuals. Sharp points out that for readers of the blog, sociology can explain why they and their friends enjoy the same brands or how advertising perpetuates gender stereotypes.

The blog allows for commenting and from these comments discussions emerge, which one reviewer has called "intelligent, respectful, and constructive". Wade and Sharp themselves have reflected on the different expectations readers have for the commenting space on their blog: "While we understand the arguments for creating safe spaces for the constructive discussion of race, gender, sexual orientation, and other issues, particularly for those groups who may face prejudice or discrimination, ensuring a truly safe space has proven impossible". Noting that the blog receives 500 to 750 comments on average per week, they had to make some decisions about how to handle the traffic. As of May 2012, the site used Disqus to moderate its comments. Users must create a profile to comment and other readers can flag comments that are inappropriate. Any comments that insult or threaten other commenters are deleted, but criticisms of Wade and Sharp's posts remain; they often highlight these rebuttals in updates to the posts or subsequent posts. More importantly, any mistakes Wade and Sharp make in the posts remain; they are fixed with updates or comments, but blog post remain in their original published format. As Wade and Sharp explain, they want to model the learning process for their readers. They feel that it is important to be able to admit mistakes and learn from them in public so that their readers will feel comfortable doing this as well.

In her review of Sociological Images, Karen McCormack identifies four different types of posts throughout the blog: visual plus, text plus, open post, and data display. In the visual plus posts, the images dominate and little text is needed to explain the point of the post. For example, she highlights a post from 14 January 2011, "Glamorizing Brutality toward Women", that juxtaposes a series of images and videos "to expose the acceptability of violence against women" and how "the more mundane images of violence are consistent with the more grotesque and disturbing". These kinds of posts are often filled with historical images "to highlight continuity or change over time", such as the ways in which different racial groups have been dehumanized through animal-like caricature. These historical trends are some of the most highlighted and praised posts by reviewers. For example, one interviewer praised The White Woman's Burden, which demonstrated the consistent colonial impulse in advertising. Text plus posts use visuals to augment the words; the majority of these posts make readers aware of sociological arguments in other fora, such as TED talks or New York Times editorials. They summarize and link to these longer form arguments. Open posts "treat the images and videos as polysemic - open to multiple and contradictory interpretations from the audience". These are "less analytic and more provocative", prompting readers to ask and answer questions. For example, in a post about color photos from the Great Depression, images dominate and the post ends with a question: "are we more able to relate to the people in the photographs because they are in colour? Do we experience less distance between their lives and our own because the medium is both more familiar and closer to what we see?" Data display posts visualize complex data so that readers can understand difficult issues in new ways; they also link readers to sites with interactive mapping tools and other kinds of software that enable them to make their own projects. McCormack points to one particularly good example of this kind of post, a video of Hans Rosling explaining the relationship between wealth and life expectancy throughout the world over the past 200 years.

Some of the posts explain specific scholarly theories for the general reader. For example, in Hand Sapolio Soap Will Make You “Welcome Among the Best People”, Sharp uses vintage soap advertisements to explain Joan Jacobs Brumberg's theories about how culture constructs a connection between girls' hygiene and feelings of personal worth. In general, the site builds on the scholarly work of advertising scholars Jean Kilbourne and Sut Jhally. As Wade and Sharp point out, they try to "pull back the curtain" on marketing and advertising in their blog. For example, they discuss how advertising has co-opted the language of "choice" from feminism and pro-choice campaigns in order to sell cosmetics.

=== Abercrombie & Fitch bikini top ===
On 19 March 2011, Sociological Images published a post which reported that Abercrombie & Fitch was marketing push up bikini tops at young girls, asking "so, at what age should girls start trying to enhance their cleavage?" Consumers demanded change from the company; as a result, Abercrombie had changed their campaign, describing their tops as "padded". Wade and Sharp write in an article mentioning this incident that "the Abercrombie post had an unusually powerful effect, but Sociological Images routinely receives e-mails and comments from public relations departments of companies responsible for advertisements or products that are analyzed on the site".

=== Princess Tiana and watermelon candy ===
On 12 March 2012, Sociological Images published a post arguing that using the Disney character Tiana to advertise watermelon candy perpetrated the racist watermelon stereotype. This criticism was reported on some other blogs.

== Teaching tool ==
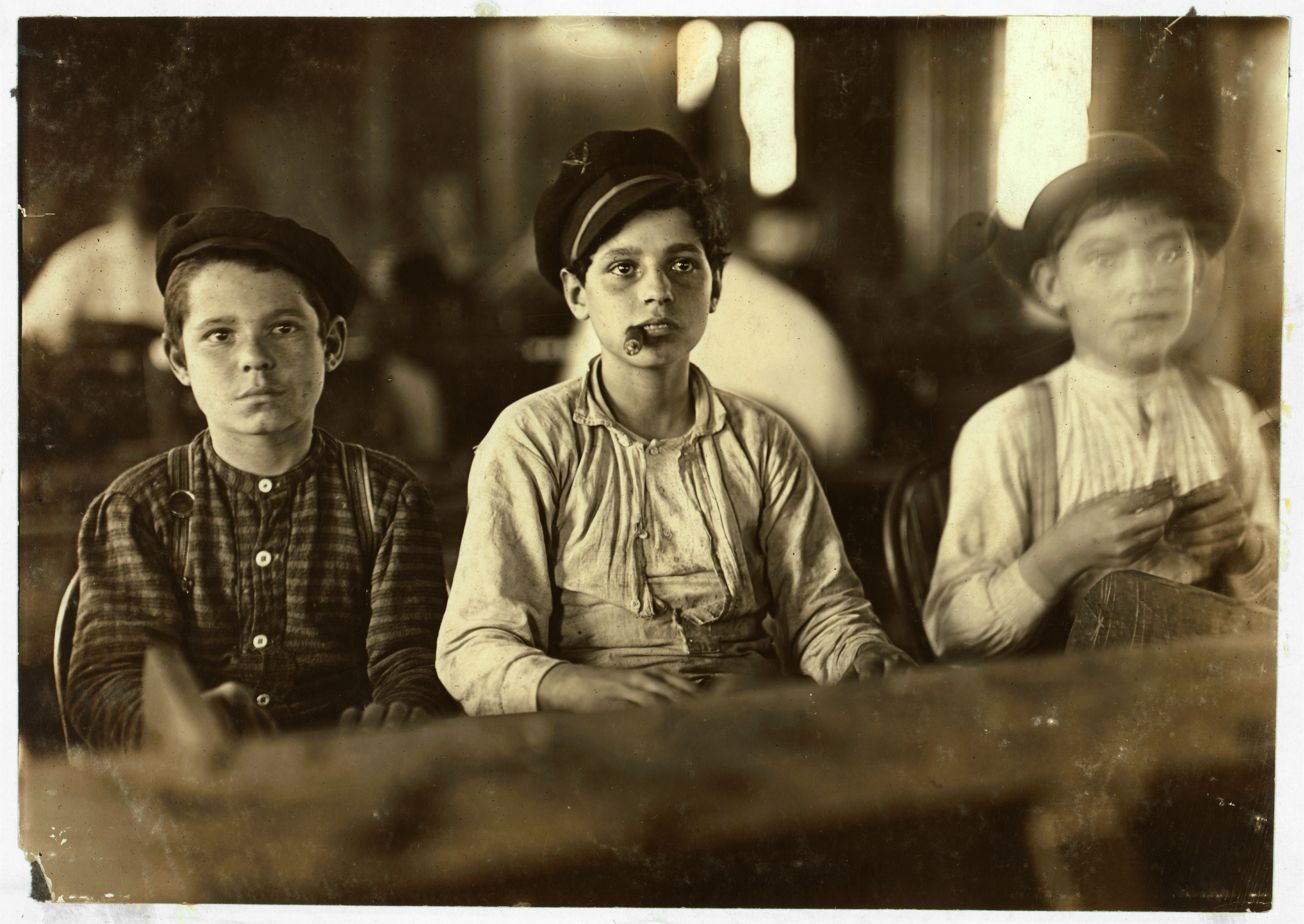
In Child Labor and the Social Construction of Childhood, Sharp demonstrates how Lewis Hine's photographs of laboring children illustrate that the definition and conception of "childhood" changes over time.

Sociological Images is designed to be used as a teaching tool as well as a blog. It is aimed at both lower- and upper-division undergraduates and is a "useful resource to connect classroom work with popular culture and media imagery" as well as "extremely useful for instructors who wish to keep pace with the abundant ways that popular culture reifies discrimination". Its content applies to courses in sociology, social science methods, media studies, gender studies, and courses focused on race, ethnicity and class. Wade and Sharp include sample assignments that allow instructors to integrate the blog into class work. For example, students can write a post and submit it to the blog. They can also select an advertisement that revolves around "sex, race, gender, family roles, nationality or class" and then find additional advertisements on their own, writing an analysis of the implicit messages in the set. In her review of the blog, Karen McCormack describes how well the posts lend themselves to generating class discussion. She cites the post "The Double Standard in Sexualizing Teen Celebrities" as one way to spark discussion; "while students may disagree about differences in male and female vulnerability and sexuality, a class exploring gender could be enhanced by referring to the images as a way of focusing discussion on the larger issue of how different groups are represented differently and unequally". McCormack also points out that the high-quality comments on the blog "provide a strong model for students learning to read and analyse critically". The site also includes course guides that organize posts from the blog around frequently taught sociology concepts. Wade and Sharp have also created a complementary Pinterest board that organizes the images from Sociological Images into 23 topic areas, such as race, heteronormativity, sexy toy makeovers, and gendered parenting and housework.

== Reception ==
=== Site statistics and publicity ===
Sociological Images receives about 500,000 visitors each month. As of 2011, the site was visited over 7 million times with a total of 11.4 million page views. It has over 20,000 RSS subscribers, 16,000 Facebook readers, 7,000 Twitter subscribers, and 10,000 readers on Pinterest. The site is partially syndicated on two high-profile blogs, namely Jezebel and Ms. Posts from Sociological Images have also been reposted at Racialicious, Adios Barbie, Love Isn't Enough, Scientopia, Owni, and Conhecimento Prudente. As a result of the publicity from the blog, Wade and Sharp are often consulted by media outlets as experts. The "In the News" section lists over 100 appearances, including outlets such as NPR and CNN. Wade and Sharp believe that their post Evolution of Evony Video Game Ads is their most popular post.

Readers of Sociological Images tend to be between 18 and 34 years old, female and college educated, with incomes of less than $60,000. Forty-nine percent of readers are in the United States, 10% from Western Europe, 10% from Canada, 5% from India, and 2% from Australia. Readers are drawn to the site in a variety of ways, some as part of their daily reading habits and some through internet searching, such as through the phrase "Disney princess". Social networking sites also account for a significant amount of the site's traffic. Over 700,000 visits in 2011 came from Facebook and 50,000 from Twitter. Reposts on other sites also bring in a significant amount of traffic. For example, Feministing and Jezebel each accounted for 50,000 visitors in 2011. News aggregators also bring in a substantial number as well; reddit brought in 125,000 in 2011.

=== Reviews ===
Sociological Images was reviewed by Karen McCormack in Visual Studies. She praised the blog's ability to explain sociology to those outside academia, writing that "the most exciting thing about Sociological images is that it can truly bring sociology to everyone", but she did point out some "drawbacks" to the blog form itself, such as the lack of space to discuss the original context for some of the images. It was also reviewed by David T. Mayeda in Teaching Sociology, who praised it as "an insightful, thought-provoking site that can be used by sociology instructors and students". He particularly highlights the ways in which the authors "show how discriminatory imagery evolves over time, preserving dominant narratives in society, but manifesting in different ways depending on the social context". He emphasizes that the audience of the site is not other academics, pointing out that the site "tends not to provide deeper theoretical rhetoric in its entries". In their review of the site, MERLOT (Multimedia Educational Resource for Learning and Online Teaching), wrote that the site "strongly encourages us to develop our sociological imaginations by presenting brief discussions of timely and compelling imagery, spanning the breadth of sociological inquiry".

Male privilege and entitlement posts on the site tend to receive the greatest volume of negative reactions. Readers will sometimes argue that gender equity already exists and that Wade and Sharp are reading "too much into" the images. In particular, posts that deconstruct sexual power dynamics and sexual violence are some that receive the most resistance. People are scared to realize, Wade says, that "their body has internalized" these gender expectations. Moreover, while the site's posts on gender inequity are often "routinely praised" by many readers, they are also linked to by men's rights groups, attracting criticism. But it is posts about fat and health related to weight that bring out the most hurtful speech in the comments. Sharp mentions in an interview that she has to take significantly more time out to monitor the site after she posts on these topics to delete and respond to fat-shaming.

=== Awards ===
- 2009, Pacific Sociological Association
- 2012, American Sociological Association Section on Communication and Information Technologies
- 2012, University of Minnesota Sociology Department
