= No-pan kissa =

Type of maid café in Japan

A no-pan kissa (Japanese: ノーパン喫茶, Hepburn: Nōpan kissa; pronounced [noːpaŋ kiꜜssa], lit. 'no-panties cafés') is an establishment in Japan that offers food and drinks served by waitresses wearing short skirts with no underwear. The floors, or sections of the floor, are sometimes mirrored. Shops generally operate under a "no-touch" policy. The shops otherwise look like normal coffee shops (kissaten), rather than sexual establishments, although they charge a premium price for the coffee.

== History ==
The first no-pan kissa was opened in Osaka in 1980. Initially, all such establishments were in remote areas outside the traditional entertainment districts. Within a year, large numbers of them had opened in more central locations, such as major railway stations.

In the 1980s, the decade when these shops were most popular, many started to have topless or bottomless waitresses. The number of such shops then started to decline rapidly.

The New Amusement Business Control and Improvement Act came into force on February 13, 1985, which further restricted the sex industry and protected the more traditional businesses. Eventually, such coffee shops gave way to fashion health (massage) clubs and few no-pan kissa, if any, remain.

== Related establishments ==
In addition to no-pan kissa, there have also been no-pan shabu-shabu restaurants and no-pan karaoke bars. In 1998, four officials at the Ministry of Finance were arrested and 112 were disciplined for accepting bribes in the form of visits to a no-pan shabu-shabu restaurant in Shinjuku.

== See also ==
- Café con piernas
- Maid café
- Sexuality in Japan
