= Bellwether Gallery =

Art gallery in New York City

Coordinates: 40.74486°N 74.00622°W

Bellwether Gallery was a New York City art gallery based in Chelsea. Director and owner Becky Smith was recognized as an important promoter of emerging artists since the gallery's 1999 opening in the Greenpoint neighborhood of Brooklyn. The gallery moved to Chelsea in 2005 and closed in 2009.

Some of the artists represented by Bellwether:

- John Bauer
- Tanyth Berkeley
- Ion Birch
- Corinne Botz
- Clayton Brothers
- Adam Cvijanovic
- Daphne Fitzpatrick
- Dana Frankfort
- Anne Hardy
- Nathan Mabry
- Trevor Paglen
- Ruth Root
- Amanda Ross-Ho
- Allison Smith
- Marc Swanson
- Ellen Altfest
