= Lisa Lapinski =

American visual artist (born 1967)

- Born: 1967 (age 58–59); Palo Alto, CA
- Occupations: Artist, Sculpture Professor

Lisa Lapinski (born in 1967 in Palo Alto, California) is an American visual artist who creates dense, formally complex sculptures which utilize both the language of traditional craft and advanced semiotics. Her uncanny objects interrogate the production of desire and the exchange of meaning in an image-based society. Discussing a group show in 2007, New York Times Art Writer Holland Cotter noted, "An installation by Lisa Lapinski carries a hefty theory- studies title: 'Christmas Tea-Meeting, Presented by Dialogue and Humanism, Formerly Dialectics and Humanism.' But the piece itself just looks breezily enigmatic." It is often remarked that viewers of Lapinski's sculptures are enticed into an elaborate set of ritualistic decodings. In a review of her work published in ArtForum, Michael Ned Holte noted, "At such moments, it becomes clear that Lapinski's entire systemic logic is less circular than accumulative: What at first seems hermetically sealed is often surprisingly generous upon sustained investigation." Lapinski's work has been exhibited widely in the US and Europe, and she was included in the 2006 Whitney Biennial.

== Life and career ==
Lapinski received an MFA from the Art Center College of Design in Pasadena in 2000 and a BA in Philosophy from University of California in 1990. She also attended an advanced course in visual arts taught by Haim Steinbach in Como, Italy in 1999. Her work is included in public collections that include the Museum of Contemporary Art, Los Angeles; the Hammer Museum, Los Angeles; the Rubell Family Collection; and the Contemporary Arts Foundation, Miami. She received a Guggenheim Fellowship in 2004 and participated in the 2006 Whitney Biennial exhibition, Day for Night, curated by Chrissie Iles and Philippe Vergne. In 2006 Lisa's daughter Nina was born, Nina continued to be included in Lapinski's art throughout her childhood. Lapinski received the American Center Foundation grant for exhibition at Midway Contemporary Art, Minneapolis, Minnesota in 2007. Lapinski has studied and worked internationally, with exhibitions in Japan, Milan, Los Angeles, and New York.

== Work ==
In response to Lapinski's exhibition at MOCA in 2008, curator Bennett Simpson writes, "Throughout her work, Lapinski has made [...] symbolic iconography an important part of her lexicon. The prevalence of faces, cartoon silhouettes, swastikas, Stars of David, Christian crosses, corporate logotypes, and many less specific geometric figures (circles, triangles, checkerboards, and frets), which themselves contain symbolism of nature, science, or machinery, lend her sculptures and drawings a representational dimension that teeters between scientific reference and abstract decoration." Lapinski's work uses a variety of medium including word, wire, cement, and clay in addition to painting, photography, drawing, and found material with work often containing philosophical and historical references. With an unorthodox formalism and style, she uses the history and uncertain narratives of objects to create new meaning. Lapinski states, "I don't think any material dies."

== Solo exhibitions ==
Recent exhibitions of works by Lapinski include:

- 2001: Untitled (Rimbaud), Richard Telles Fine Art, Los Angeles
- 2003: Analysandom, Richard Telles Fine Art, Los Angeles
- 2003: Speech Model from the Flies; Fruits of Crime; Goose Fair (with Catherine Sullivan), Galerie Mezzanin, Vienna
- 2004: Fine Evening Sir!, Johann König, Berlin
- 2004: Goose Fair, Studio Guenzani, Milan
- 2005: Bit by Bit, Kim Light Gallery / LightBox Gallery (inaugural exhibition), Los Angeles
- 2007: When Things Collapse, Praz-Delavallade, Paris, France
- 2007: Wet Paintings in the Womb, Sprüth Magers Projekte, Munich, Germany
- 2007: Linz Wedding Song, Midway Contemporary Art, Minneapolis, Minnesota
- 2008: Richard Telles Fine Art, Los Angeles, CA
- 2008: Lisa Lapinski, The Fret and Its Variants (curated by Bennet Simpson)
- 2008: MOCA, Los Angeles
- 2009: Light Breaks Out of Prism, Thomas Solomon Gallery, Los Angeles
- 2009: Living Color, Praz-Delavallade, Paris, France
- 2009: Schürmann Berlin
- 2010: Froing and Toing, Light and Wire Gallery
- 2010: Information Leaks, Josh Lilley Gallery, London
- 2011: Dig, Praz-Delavallade, Paris, France
- 2011: Derrames, 11x7 Galeria, Buenos Aires, Argentina
- 2011: Grayscale, Thomas Solomon Gallery, Los Angeles
- 2012: Gag, Tanya Bonakdar Gallery, New York City
- 2013: Bathroom Sink, etc, Sprüth Magers, Berlin
- 2013: Datum, Josh Lilley Gallery, London
