= Bergdorf Goodman Building =

Commercial building in Manhattan, New York

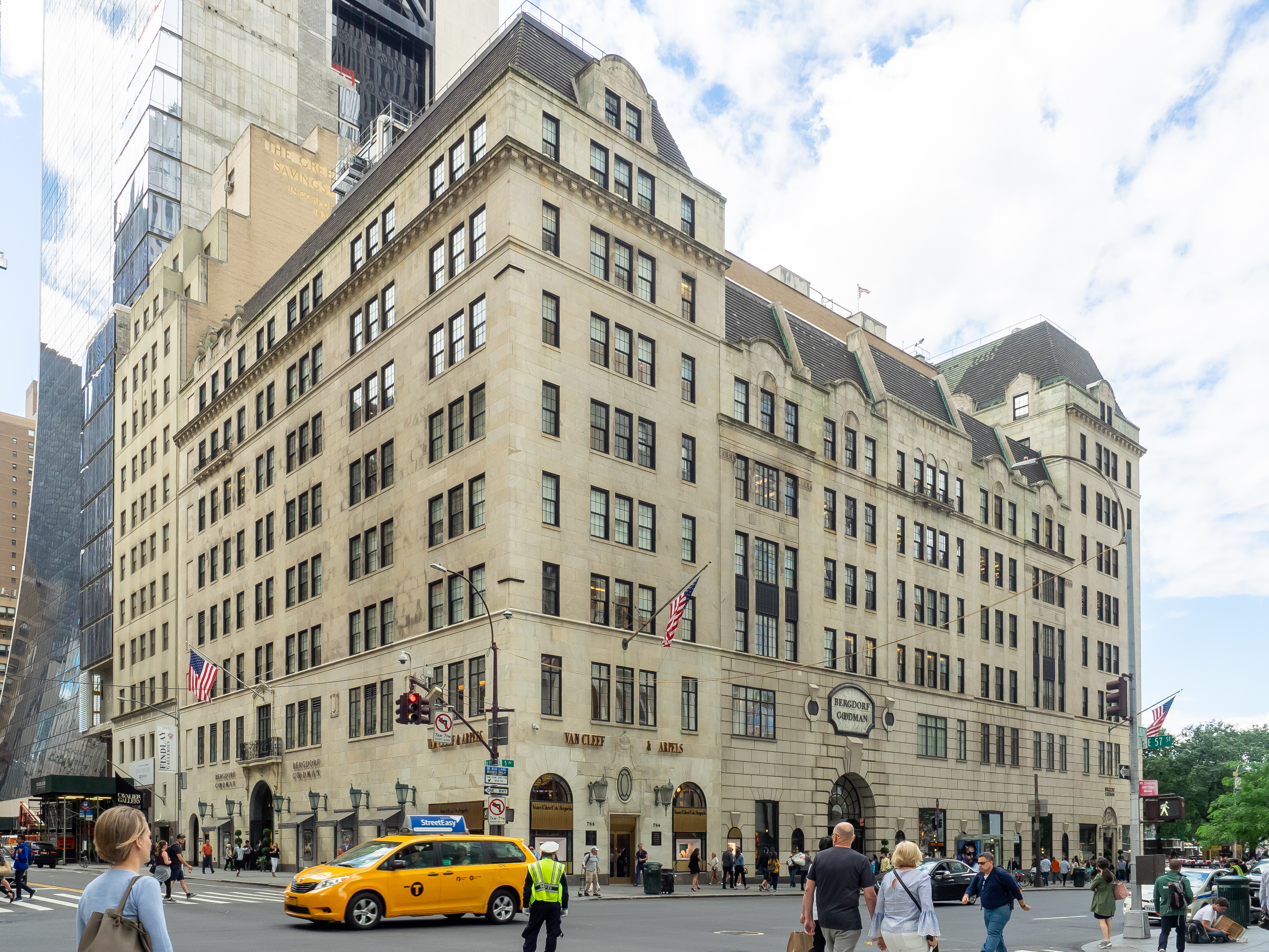
- Exterior of the Bergdorf Goodman Building (2019)

General information
- Status: Open
- Type: Department store
- Architectural style: French classical
- Location: 754 Fifth Avenue, New York City, New York, United States
- Coordinates: 40°45′49″N 73°58′26″W
- Current tenants: Bergdorf Goodman (1928–present); Van Cleef & Arpels (1940–present)
- Year built: 1927–1928
- Opened: 1928; 98 years ago
- Owner: Saks Global

Design and construction
- Architects: Albert Buchman; Ely Jacques Kahn
- Architecture firm: Buchman and Kahn

Other information
- Public transit: New York City Subway: at Fifth Avenue–59th Street; at 57th Street; at Lexington Avenue/59th Street; at Fifth Avenue/53rd Street

Website
- Bergdorf Goodman Building

New York City Landmark
- Designated: December 13, 2016
- Reference no.: 0735

The Bergdorf Goodman Building is a department store building at 754 Fifth Avenue between 57th and 58th streets in Midtown Manhattan, New York City. The building, designed by Albert Buchman and Ely Jacques Kahn, was erected between 1927 and 1928 as seven separate storefronts. It contains the women's store of the luxury retailer Bergdorf Goodman and, since 1940, has also included a Van Cleef & Arpels jewelry store. Over the years, the building has contained numerous smaller shops and boutiques as well. The Bergdorf Goodman Building is a New York City designated landmark.

The site was occupied by the Cornelius Vanderbilt II House from 1882 to 1927. The real-estate developer Frederick Brown bought the site in 1926 and hired Buchman & Kahn to design several store structures on the site. Originally, Bergdorf Goodman leased out only the northernmost storefront, while the other stores were leased to a variety of tenants, such as Dobbs & Co., Parke-Bernet, and the Tailored Woman. The Mutual Life Insurance Company took over the storefronts at a foreclosure auction in 1934. Bergdorf Goodman bought the northern half of the site the next year, followed by the southern half in 1947, and eventually expanded its store into the entire building. Major renovations took place in the late 1950s, late 1960s, and early 1980s. The building was converted into Bergdorf Goodman's women's store in 1990, after a new men's store opened across Fifth Avenue. Further renovations were carried out during the 2000s and 2010s.

The design was intended to evoke the architecture of the old Vanderbilt mansion. The building is clad in white South Dover marble, with multicolored veins, and is topped by a green mansard roof. The northernmost and southernmost sections of the building were built as nine-story structures, while the center of the building was originally seven stories high. Initially, the structures functioned as separate stores, which have since been connected to each other via ramps. Bergdorf Goodman's original French-style interiors have been modified extensively over the years. The building's former tenants also designed their respective spaces in various styles, and there are multiple smaller shops and salons throughout the structure.

== Site ==
The Bergdorf Goodman Building is at 754 Fifth Avenue, on the west side of Fifth Avenue between 57th and 58th streets, in the Midtown Manhattan neighborhood of New York City. The land lot is approximately rectangular, covering 26,100 square feet (2,420 m^{2}). It has a frontage of 200 feet (61 m) on Fifth Avenue to the east, 135 feet (41 m) on 58th Street to the north, and 130 feet (40 m) on 57th Street to the south. On the same block are the Solow Building and Paris Theater to the west. Across 58th Street are the Plaza Hotel to the northwest, Grand Army Plaza to the north, and the General Motors Building to the northeast. Across 57th Street are the Crown Building and 17 West 56th Street. Other nearby buildings include the Squibb Building (745 Fifth Avenue) and 3 East 57th Street to the east, and the Tiffany & Co. flagship store, Trump Tower, and 590 Madison Avenue to the southeast.

Fifth Avenue between 42nd Street and Central Park South (59th Street) was relatively undeveloped through the late 19th century. The surrounding area was once part of the common lands of the city of New York. The Commissioners' Plan of 1811 established Manhattan's street grid with lots measuring 100 feet (30 m) deep and 25 feet (7.6 m) wide. Upscale residences were constructed around Fifth Avenue following the American Civil War. These included two residences on Fifth Avenue and 57th Street: a mansion belonging to Frederic W. Stevens at the southwest corner, and the Cornelius Vanderbilt II House on the northwest corner. By the 1900s, that section of Fifth Avenue was becoming a commercial area, and stores were also developed on 57th Street in the 1910s.

Before the Bergdorf Goodman Building's construction, the site at 754 Fifth Avenue was occupied by Cornelius Vanderbilt II's brick-and-stone mansion, which was completed in 1882. George B. Post designed the original mansion, while Richard Morris Hunt designed an annex to the rear on 58th Street in the 1890s. After Vanderbilt died in 1899, his widow Alice Claypoole Vanderbilt continued to own the mansion. Though Cornelius had bequeathed a life estate in the mansion to Alice, he did not bequeath the mansion itself. As such, all of Cornelius's heirs had to agree on any potential sale, and the New York Supreme Court had to approve such a sale.

== History ==
The Bergdorf Goodman department store traces its origins to 1899 when Herman Bergdorf, who owned a tailor shop in Manhattan, started mentoring a young merchant named Edwin Goodman. Within two years, Goodman had purchased an interest in the business, which was renamed Bergdorf Goodman. The company moved several times as the city developed further. By 1925, Bergdorf Goodman had leased space at Fifth Avenue and 52nd Street, but even that storefront was inadequate by the time it opened. Meanwhile, Alice Vanderbilt asked the New York Supreme Court for permission to sell the mansion in 1925, citing the neighborhood's redevelopment, and the court granted her request the same year. The real-estate developer G. Maurice Heckscher initially wanted to build a high-rise hotel on the Vanderbilt Mansion's site. A rival developer, Frederick Brown, instead bought the house in 1926, and the mansion was razed the next year.

=== Development ===
==== Planning and design ====
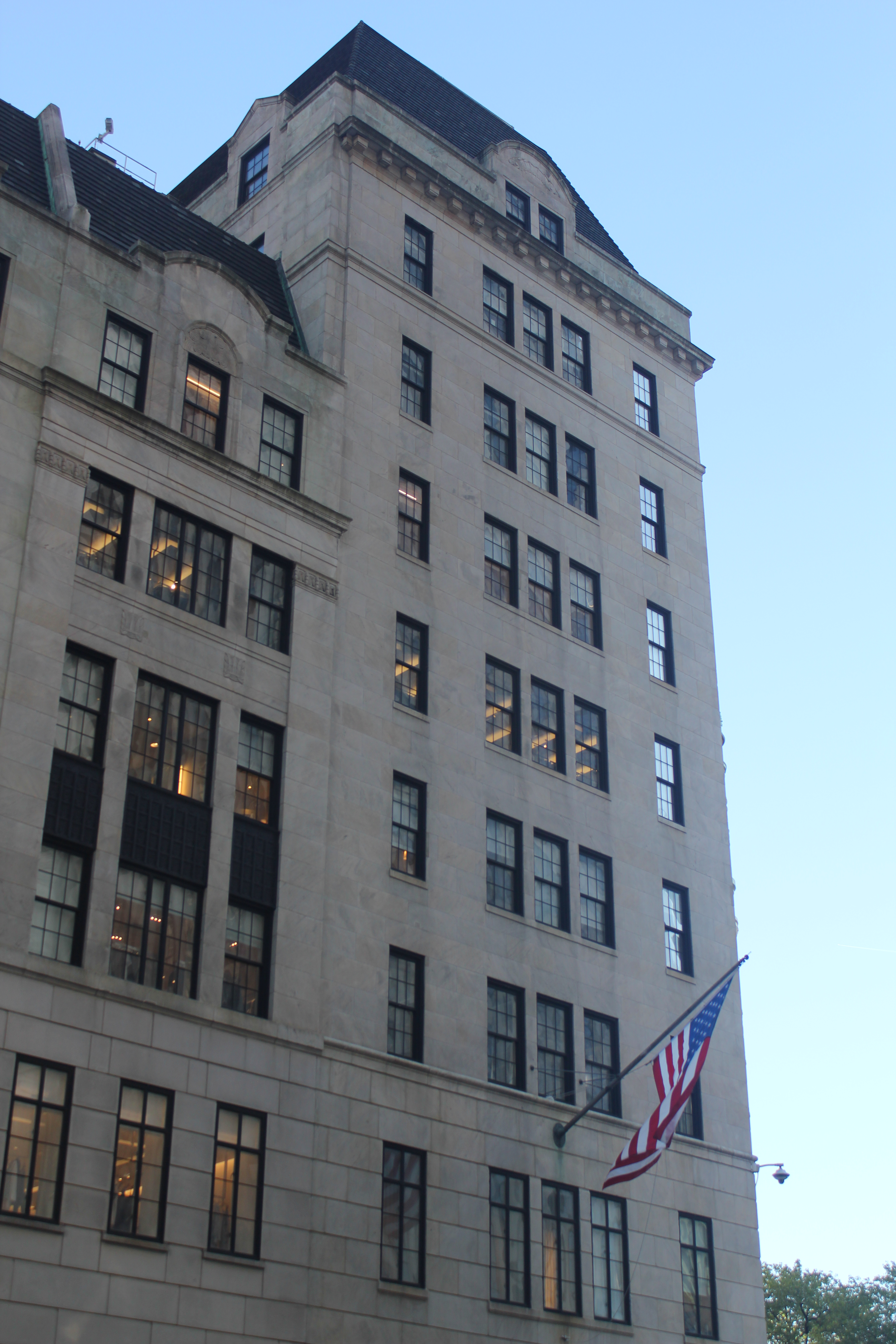
The northern end of the Fifth Avenue facade. The Bergdorf Goodman store originally occupied only this part of the building.

After Brown acquired the Vanderbilt site, he hired Albert Buchman and Ely Jacques Kahn to design several store structures on the site, each ranging from six to eight stories. Cross & Brown were hired as the real estate brokers. Kahn later recalled that, although neither Brown nor the site's real estate brokers had asked his opinion for the site, the final plans called for the construction of several stores, connected via an alley. According to Kahn, the developers met weekly to discuss the construction of the buildings, but "there was still the question as to whether the development was entirely what the circumstances warranted". G. Richard Davis & Co. was hired to erect the structures.

In March 1927, Bergdorf Goodman leased the structure at the southwest corner of 58th Street and Fifth Avenue from Frederick Brown. Bergdorf Goodman was to pay Brown $187,500 a year until 1949. Bergdorf Goodman offered to buy the rest of the Vanderbilt site outright, but Brown rejected the offer. Brown submitted plans for the first building to the New York City Department of Buildings later that March, and the plans for the other stores were filed that April. The plans called for an arcade extending between 57th and 58th streets, as well as seven storefronts measuring between 22 and 40 feet (6.7 and 12.2 m) wide. The central five storefronts were to be shorter than the outer two storefronts. In December 1927, the New York Building Congress gave awards to sixteen people who had worked on the buildings.

==== Completion and opening ====
Edwin Goodman announced in January 1928 that he would move into a 14-room apartment atop the northernmost structure. At the time, the store manufactured its own garments on site, and city law allowed only janitors to live above the store. To get around this restriction, Goodman assumed the title of "janitor", leading to him being called "New York's wealthiest janitor". The Bergdorf Goodman store in the northernmost structure opened to the public in early March 1928, being the first structure to open. When the store buildings were completed, there were concerns that the stores would not receive much traffic. However, within two months of the new store's opening, Bergdorf Goodman reported that its business had increased by 60%. For the next several decades, the Fifth Avenue building remained Bergdorf Goodman's only location.

Meanwhile, Dobbs & Co. leased the three southernmost structures, at the northwest corner of 57th Street and Fifth Avenue, that January. At the time, Dobbs planned to use four floors in all three structures; Crofut & Knapp Co. was to lease the fifth floor, while the remaining two or three floors in each structure would be leased to other stores. Dobbs & Co. combined five of the storefronts into a single store. The Bergdorf Goodman Building's four southernmost structures were thus originally known as the Dobbs Building. The Dobbs store opened on October 16, 1928. Multiple retailers negotiated for space in the remaining structures on the Vanderbilt site. The development of the Bergdorf Goodman Building contributed to the growth of 57th Street as a retail corridor.

=== Early years ===
==== Brown ownership ====
After the buildings were completed in 1928, Brown transferred ownership of the storefronts to the Barclay-Arrow Corporation. By early 1929, Bergdorf Goodman had outgrown the northernmost storefront. As such, the company leased the two structures to the south of its original storefront that May; these storefronts had been empty ever since their completion. Theodore Hofstatter was hired to renovate the second through sixth stories of these buildings, adding offices to the fifth floor and workrooms on the sixth floor. Bergdorf Goodman added a shoe department, and it also added a boudoir and hired Grand Duchess Maria Pavlovna of Russia to run the boudoir. Bergdorf Goodman subleased the ground floor and basement of 750 Fifth Avenue to the linen shop Mosse Inc. in July 1929, and the ground floor and basement of 754 Fifth Avenue was leased to Tecla Pearls Inc. that November. In addition, the Plaza Trust Company agreed to lease a storefront facing 57th Street.

Dobbs & Co. filed for bankruptcy in May 1931, and the contents of its store at 57th Street and Fifth Avenue were auctioned off the next month. That December, the Mutual Life Insurance Company filed to foreclose on two mortgages worth a combined $6,075,000 (equivalent to $128,612,000 in 2025). Though the Barclay-Arrow Corporation had defaulted only on the $90,000 interest payment, Mutual Life wanted to compel Barclay-Arrow to pay the entire amounts of both mortgages. The buildings were supposed to be sold at auction in early 1932, but the auction was postponed twice. Brown declared bankruptcy later the same year. Bergdorf Goodman leased back 754 Fifth Avenue from Tecla Pearls in August 1933, with plans to expand its shoe department there. The apparel shop Grande Maison de Blanc leased the storefront at number 746 in July 1934, and Grande Maison's store opened that September.

==== Foreclosure and split ownership ====
Mutual Life moved to foreclose on the buildings again in August 1934, saying Barclay-Arrow owed $6,575,000 (equivalent to $158,242,000 in 2025). Mutual Life bought the buildings later that month, paying $100,000 (equivalent to $2,407,000 in 2025) at a foreclosure auction. The art-glass firm Steuben Glass leased space at the building in the mid-1930s and began hosting exhibits there in February 1935. The 754 Fifth Avenue Corporation, a subsidiary of Bergdorf Goodman, agreed to buy the northernmost structure that April for an estimated $3 million. This marked the first time that ownership of the storefronts had been divided. Steuben Glass moved out of the building during 1937. The same year, Parfums Chevalier Garde Inc. took over 750 Fifth Avenue, and Parke-Bernet leased four floors in the Dobbs Building. Bergdorf Goodman subsidiary Delman Shoe Salon took over Mosse Inc.'s old space at number 750 in April 1938, after Mosse moved out. The Tailored Woman Inc. leased the storefront at number 742 that July, and that storefront was redesigned. Parke-Bernet moved out of number 742 that August, and the Tailored Woman's three-story store opened there the next month.

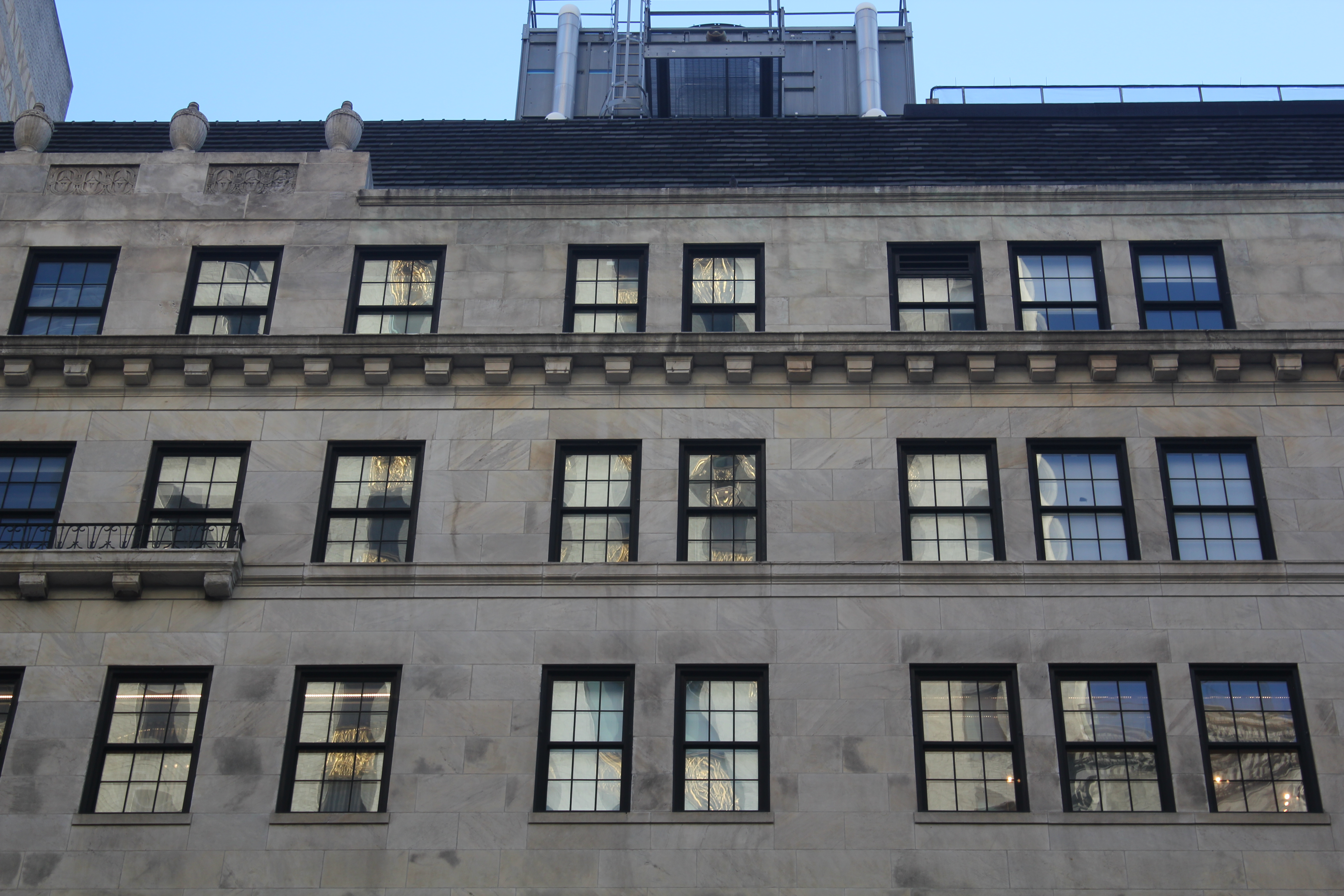
Details of the upper-story windows

Bergdorf Goodman leased the ground floor of 748 Fifth Avenue in late 1940 for an expansion of the Delman Shoe Salon. The same year, the jewelry firm Van Cleef & Arpels leased number 744, and the beauty salon Victor Ferrantelle leased the second floor of number 748. The gown store Rose Amado, the furrier M. P. Penichek, the Tobe-Coburn School for Fashion Careers, and the milliner Northridge Inc. all leased space in 1 West 57th Street in 1941. In addition, Florence Reichman opened her millinery store in that building. After Grande Maison de Blanc moved out of the storefront at number 746, the dressmaker Mary Lewis leased space at that address in February 1944 and opened a six-story shop there that April. The Mary Lewis store's bright-yellow front door, designed by Skidmore, Owings, & Merrill, elicited complaints from other business owners, since it clashed with the building's overall design. Mary Lewis expanded its space the next year, adding a shoe shop at the rear of its store. Following World War II, the Tailored Woman announced plans to expand into the upper stories of 742 Fifth Avenue once existing tenants' leases expired. Meanwhile, Mary Lewis leased space on the second floor of number 746, relocating its women's shoe salon there in August 1947.

=== Bergdorf Goodman takeover and expansion ===
==== 1940s and 1950s ====
Bergdorf Goodman acquired the structures closest to 57th Street in December 1947, giving the company full control of all the storefronts. At the time, the Tailored Women, Mary Lewis, and Van Cleef & Arpels rented the other storefronts. 754 Fifth Avenue Inc., acting on behalf of Bergdorf Goodman, acquired the southernmost structures in February 1948. Subsequently, 754 Fifth Avenue Inc. sued the Tailored Woman for unpaid rent; the Tailored Woman, in turn, claimed the owner was hurting business by interfering with the building's elevator service. The New York Supreme Court ultimately dismissed 754 Fifth Avenue Inc.'s complaint and fined the landlord, though the fine was later overturned. The salon chain Blanchette-Mack Inc. leased space at 1 West 57th Street in May 1950. The Tailored Woman extended its lease that July, taking nearly all of the space at 1 West 57th Street and 742–744 Fifth Avenue. The Tailored Woman planned to install an air-conditioning system and increase its floor area from 38,000 to 60,000 square feet (3,500 to 5,600 m^{2}), adding a fur salon and a young women's department.

Meanwhile, Mary Lewis closed its store at number 746 in June 1950, and Bergdorf Goodman began planning an expansion in the former Mary Lewis storefront. Bergdorf Goodman opened a beauty salon in the building the same November, and it opened five miniature shops within the old Mary Lewis space the next February. Simultaneously, Bergdorf Goodman expanded its existing sales departments into the upper floors of number 746. The Tailored Woman opened a "markdown room" within its portion of the building in April 1951, and it subleased the seventh floor of number 742 to the perfumer Chanel Inc. the next year. During the early 1950s, Bergdorf Goodman also renovated its portion of the building as part of a five-year program. Workers relocated the elevators, installed an air-conditioning system, relocated various departments, and added several new departments.

Edwin Goodman died in 1953. His son Andrew moved into the penthouse apartment and took over Bergdorf Goodman after his father's death. Andrew Goodman announced in January 1955 that he would add the Miss Bergdorf specialty shop to the building. The work included installing two elevators, adding 15 fitting rooms, and redesigning the fifth floor in a neoclassical Regency style for $500,000. The Miss Bergdorf shop opened that August, being the store's first major expansion in nearly three decades, and quickly became popular. The building's hosiery department was expanded the same year. Bergdorf Goodman announced in March 1959 that it would add 21,000 square feet (2,000 m^{2}) by infilling an interior courtyard, leasing back the eighth floor of 742 Fifth Avenue from the Tailored Woman, and leasing the sixth floor of the Paris Theatre. This would provide space for an expansion of the beauty salon and bridal, corset, fur, men's, and shoe departments, in addition to a new children's department and additional dressing rooms. The company also planned to add three elevators to improve visitor flow.

==== 1960s ====
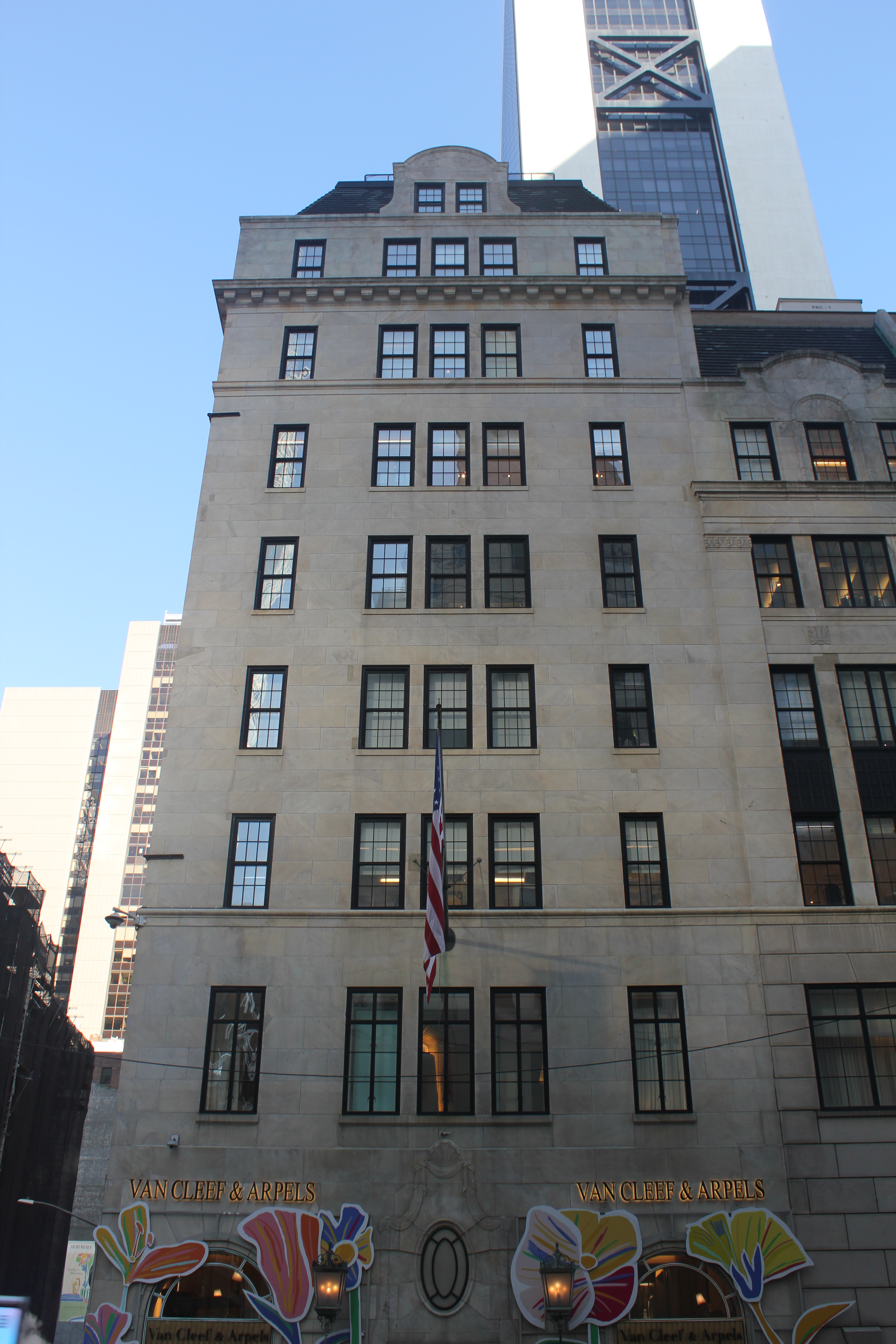
The building seen from 57th Street, with the Solow Building behind it

An antiques department opened within the building in October 1960, and a beauty salon called the Coiffures American Salon was completed there two months later. The following August, Bergdorf Goodman opened its bridal salon and Wedgwood room on the building's fourth floor. A Christmas boutique in the building opened in late 1964, and Andrew Goodman announced plans to modify the building the same year. Employee facilities on the fifth floor were to be relocated to the roof to make way for stockrooms, and the first floor spaces would also be renovated. The BiGi department, which sold clothing for teenage girls, opened on the building's sixth floor in February 1966.

Tailored Woman announced that it would close its store at 742 Fifth Avenue in 1967. Bergdorf Goodman bought out the Tailored Woman's lease and announced that it would spend $2.5 million to add around 50,000 square feet (4,600 m^{2}) to the store. Bergdorf Goodman hired Percy Cashmore to design the renovation. The project added a new entrance and a men's department along 57th Street, and it also involved demolishing some interior walls and stairs. Van Cleef & Arpels was relocated to the corner of Fifth Avenue and 57th Street, while Chanel remained on the seventh floor. Several departments were expanded, including the couture department on the second story, Miss Bergdorf on the fifth story, and BiGi on the sixth story. The enlarged men's salon and a new entrance opened in November 1968. The BiGi department reopened the next February, and several other departments reopened later in 1969. By then, several real-estate developers had expressed interest in buying the building. These included Sheldon Solow, who unsuccessfully tried to buy the site while developing the Solow Building next door.

==== 1970s and 1980s ====
The furniture shop Mallett & Son began leasing part of the building's second floor in 1970. Broadway-Hale Stores proposed acquiring Bergdorf Goodman in 1971 and leasing the building back from Andrew Goodman. According to Goodman, if the Federal Trade Commission (FTC) had not approved the merger, he would have needed to convert the Bergdorf Goodman Building to an office building. After the FTC approved the acquisition the next year, Goodman leased the building to Broadway-Hale and continued to live in the penthouse apartment atop the building. Under the terms of the lease, Broadway-Hale could not sell items at other stores in Manhattan that were also being sold at the Bergdorf Goodman Building. The Goodman family later revoked this lease restriction after the Neiman Marcus chain acquired Bergdorf Goodman and paid the family off.

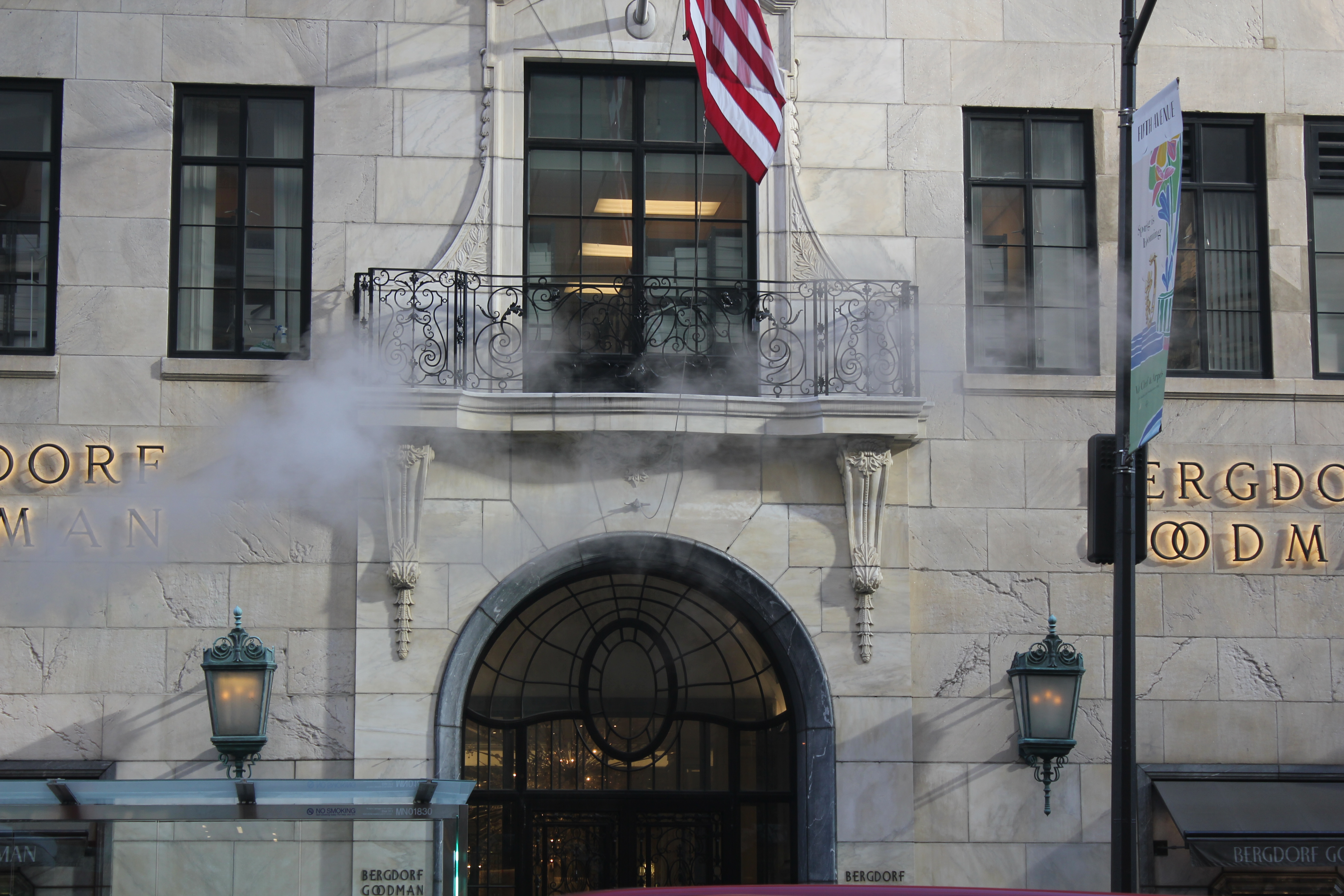
The entrance on Fifth Avenue

During the mid-1970s, an expanded men's department opened on the second floor, and Bergdorf Goodman also moved and expanded its cosmetics department. Several other departments were expanded or relocated, and the Sixth Sense contemporary-fashion department was added to the sixth floor. These renovations cost a total of $15 million. Bergdorf Goodman shut down the fur-manufacturing facility on the seventh floor in 1976. The company announced plans for an haute couture department on the second floor in 1977, and several storefronts for European design firms opened on that story the next year. The building originally had 15 such shops, many of which became highly profitable. Several entire floors had been renovated by 1980, and Bergdorf Goodman was also planning an extensive renovation, having closed its only other store in White Plains, New York. By then, the company had outgrown the building's selling space.

In 1981, Bergdorf Goodman announced a $15 million renovation of the Fifth Avenue flagship store. The project involved building a main entrance on Fifth Avenue, relocating the store's offices to a neighboring building, and expanding selling space by up to 50 percent. The seventh floor was expanded, and new escalators linked the first floor to the expanded seventh floor. When the renovation began in early 1982, the company's CEO Ira Neimark predicted that the expansion would double Bergdorf Goodman's sales. The first phase of the renovation (including the new escalators) was finished in August 1983, followed the next month by a new intimate-apparel department on the fourth floor. The same year, the lighting designer Douglas Leigh added floodlights atop the building. In addition, a home-furnishing boutique called the Musee des Arts Decoratifs opened there.

Bergdorf Goodman hired the advertising firm Arnell/Bickford Associates to advertise various aspects of the renovated building, such as the escalators. Angela Cummings opened a jewelry shop on the building's ground floor in February 1984, followed by the Guerlain perfume boutique that May. The expanded cosmetics department next to Guerlain opened later that year, and taller storefront windows were also added. The clothing brand Sergio Valente opened a 3,100-square-foot (290 m^{2}) salon in September 1985, and Bergdorf Goodman's home department on the seventh floor opened toward the end of the year. The home department was the last part of the expansion to be completed. Another salon, for the fashion house Calvin Klein, opened on the third floor in 1986. The Miss Bergdorf department on the sixth floor was renovated again in 1987, and a dozen boutique shops were added to the floor. During that project, Bergdorf Goodman added 5,000 square feet (460 m^{2}) of selling space by removing some backroom areas. Bergdorf Goodman also built six accessories boutiques on the ground floor, along Fifth Avenue, in 1988. The boutiques, designed by J. T. Nakaoka, cost $1 million to construct.

=== Women's store ===
Bergdorf Goodman announced plans to relocate its men's apparel department across the street to 745 Fifth Avenue in 1988. At the time, the store occupied 141,000 square feet (13,100 m^{2}), and its annual sales amounted to about $1,000 per square foot ($11,000/m^{2}). The relocation of the men's department would allow the women's departments in the original building to be renovated.

==== 1990s and 2000s ====
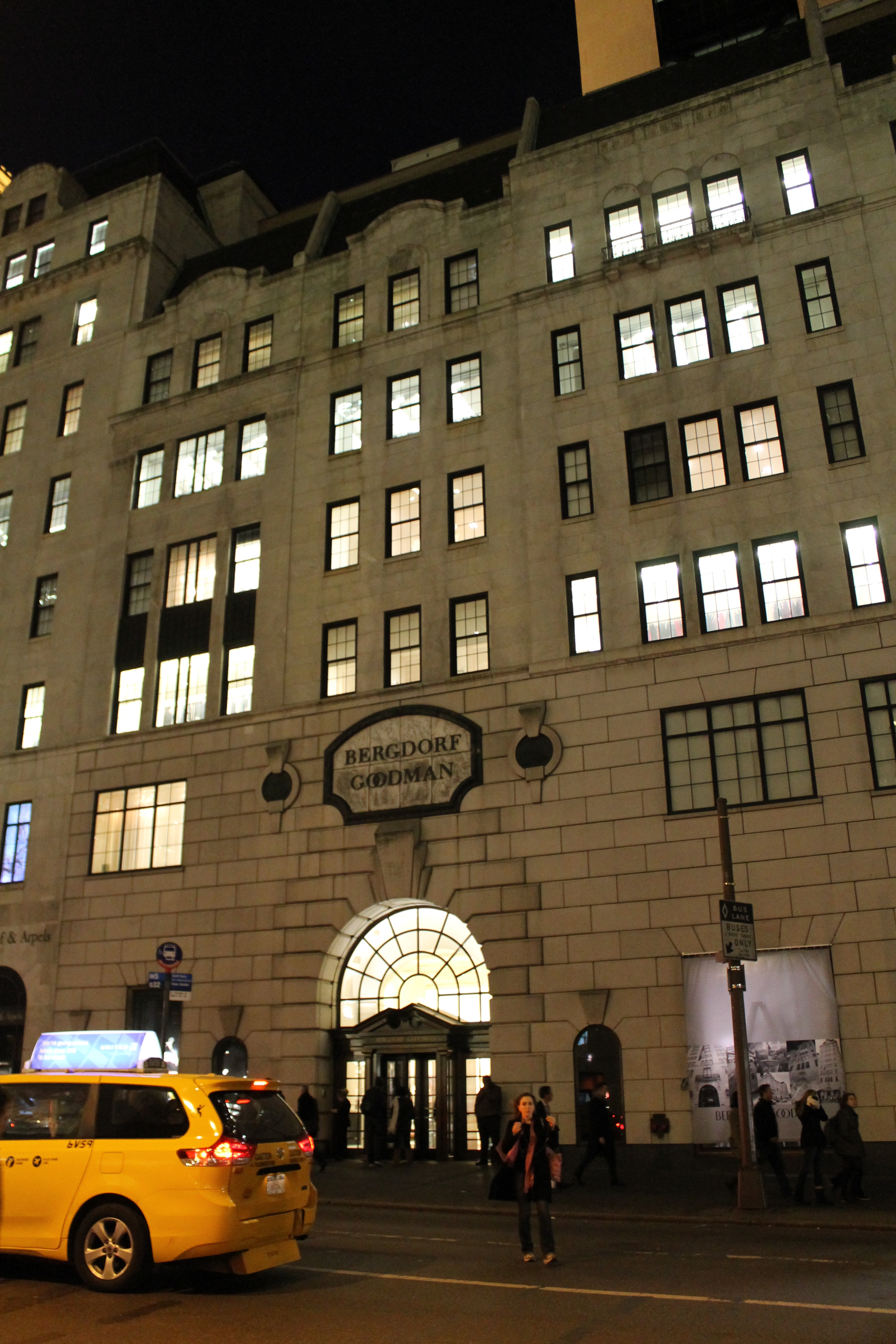
The main entrance seen at night

The cosmetics department in the original building was expanded in June 1990. After the new men's store opened that August, Bergdorf Goodman announced plans to renovate the original flagship. The project was to include several new boutiques, as well as the relocation of multiple departments on the first through fourth stories, at a cost of $5 million. The company opened an accessories department on the building's fifth floor in 1992, and it renovated that floor in a contemporary architectural style, adding lower-priced clothing departments there. Eva Jiřičná designed the fifth-floor renovation, which involved relocating stockrooms, adding a stair, and demolishing some interior walls. Bergdorf Goodman spent $150,000 to renovate its hosiery department the next year.

During 1994, Bergdorf Goodman opened a Vivienne Westwood boutique on the third floor and a cafe on the fifth floor. The northern portion of the sixth floor was also reconstructed to accommodate more boutiques. After the Frédéric Fekkai hair salon in the building closed in 1996, the John Barrett salon and the Susan Ciminelli day spa opened on the ninth floor the next year, within the former Goodman family penthouse. The restaurateur Daniel Boulud also opened a "tea salon" in the building. The facade of the Bergdorf Goodman Building was cleaned extensively in 1998, and Van Cleef & Arpels announced plans to renovate its store there the same year. The J. Mendel fur boutique on the second floor opened in 1999. Bergdorf Goodman expanded its beauty departments into the basement that year. The support and material-handling offices in the basement were moved to a warehouse in Queens. In addition, a coat check, lounges, flower shop, and restaurant were added; the project cost $30 million. The beauty department, designed by Yabu Pushelberg, inspired the construction of similar departments in other stores' basements.

A Best & Co.-branded children's boutique opened at the building in 2001, as well as an Agnona women's shop on the first floor. The next year, the shoe salon was expanded. Bergdorf Goodman also planned to renovate the main floor and expand the decorative-home department into the eighth floor. These modifications were delayed due to financial shortfalls and leadership changes. In 2002, the company began carrying out further renovations. The designer-accessories shops were relocated from the first to the second floor, while accessories stores, a fine-jewelry room, and a handbag store were built on the first floor. In addition, the 58th Street entrance was rebuilt, and the company replaced the building's mechanical systems and architectural design details. By then, the building was earning about $1,500 per square foot ($16,000/m^{2}) per year, and there was little space for the store to physically expand. The cost of the renovation was estimated at $75 million. The renovation of the first and second stories was finished in 2003, and the Cummings boutique in the building closed that year.

The Bergdorf Goodman Building underwent additional renovations in the mid-2000s. These included a new seventh-floor restaurant, a rebuilt sportswear department on the fifth floor, a personal-shopping department on the fourth floor, and designer sportswear boutiques on the third floor. The 5F department on the fifth floor opened in October 2005, and the BG restaurant opened the next month. In addition, Guerlain moved its store to the basement. The third level was the final part of the Bergdorf Goodman Building to be renovated, reopening in December 2006. At that point, the company had spent $85 million restoring the building. An accessories shop on the fifth floor opened in 2007, along with a fine-jewelry department on the main floor. An Eskandar designer store, a Lanvin store, and a designer jewelry room all opened in the building during 2008. This was followed by a Versace shop the next year.

==== 2010s to present ====
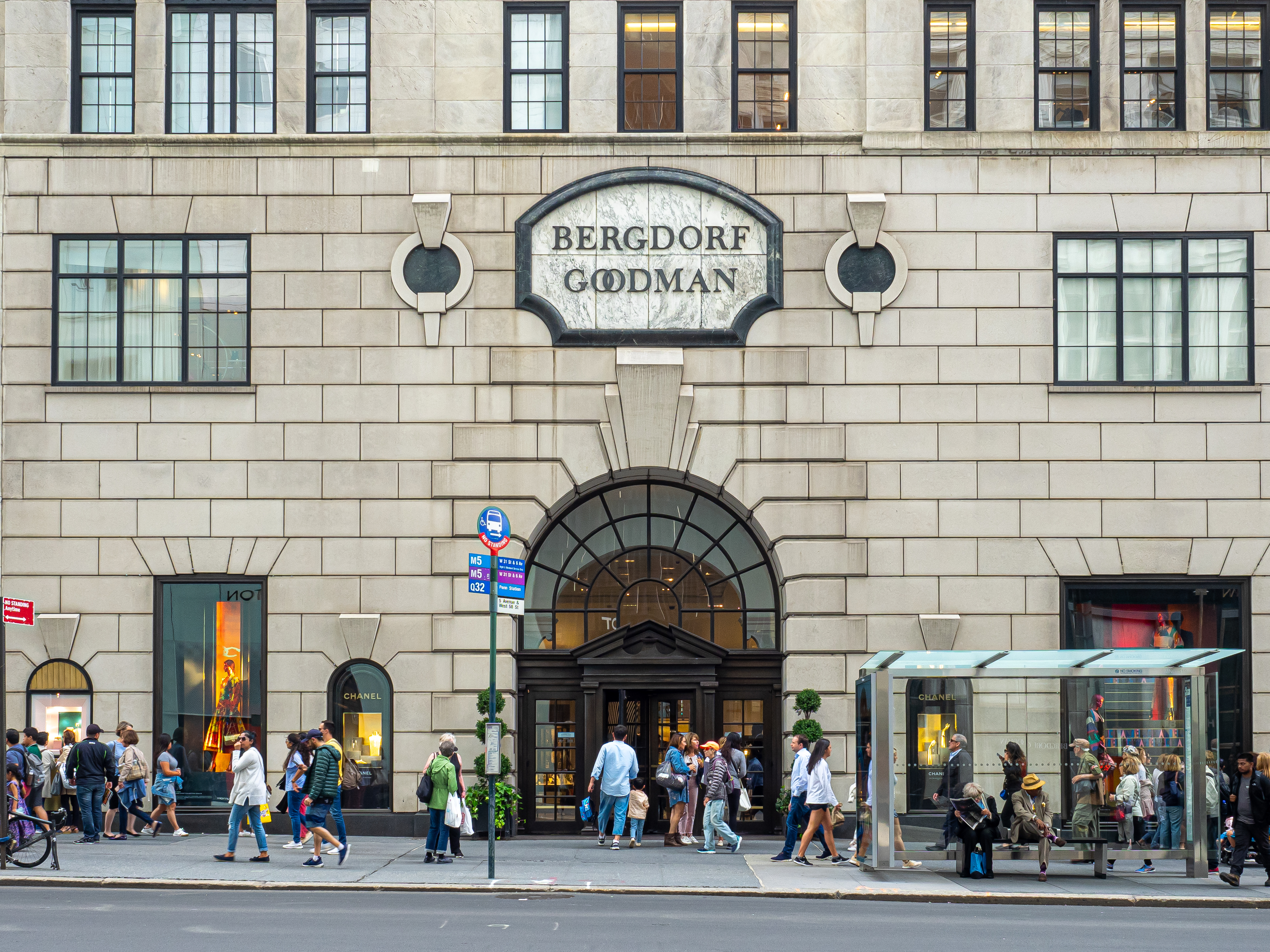
The Fifth Avenue entrance

Bergdorf Goodman opened a 1,200-square-foot (110 m^{2}) children's department on the seventh floor in 2010. The following year, the building added boutiques by the fashion designer Jason Wu, the fashion house Tom Ford, and Chanel. A store for the fashion house Valentino also opened within the building, and Bergdorf Goodman planned to add shops and expand the fifth-floor shoe department and children's area. Bergdorf Goodman announced in 2013 that it would renovate the structure once again as part of its five-year BG 20/20 plan. The project involved expanding the shoe salon and several designer boutiques, relocating the Chanel and Celine boutiques, and adding a designer-clothing lab and a store for the fashion label The Row to the sixth floor. The project also involved removing some partitions and separating the jewelry and leather departments on the first floor. A Dior boutique opened there in 2013, and the hair department in the basement was also expanded.

A renovation on the sixth floor began in June 2014, and new accessory shops for Dior and Tom Ford opened that September. The sixth story was completely rebuilt. The local architectural firm MNA redesigned the first story, and an arched entrance and a jewelry room were built on 57th Street. The sixth-story renovation was completed in September 2015, followed by the jewelry salon that December and the renovated main floor in September 2016. The company also planned to add 25,000 square feet (2,300 m^{2}) of selling space on the eighth and ninth floors by relocating its backroom spaces and offices to the Paris Theater. Bergdorf Goodman's senior vice president Linda Fargo opened a Linda's shop on the fourth floor in 2017, and the Barrett salon in the building closed two years later.

The building was temporarily closed in March 2020 during the COVID-19 pandemic in New York City, and it reopened for limited service after three months. The Palette cafe in the basement was renovated by Kit Kemp in 2021, and Schiaparelli opened a boutique on the fourth floor that year. In addition, a beauty salon known as Salon Yoshiko opened on the ninth floor in 2022, though it closed down after a year. The Linda's shop was also expanded in 2023. The Palette cafe was closed the next year and replaced by an Italian cafe known as Café Ginori, which opened in July 2024.

== Architecture ==
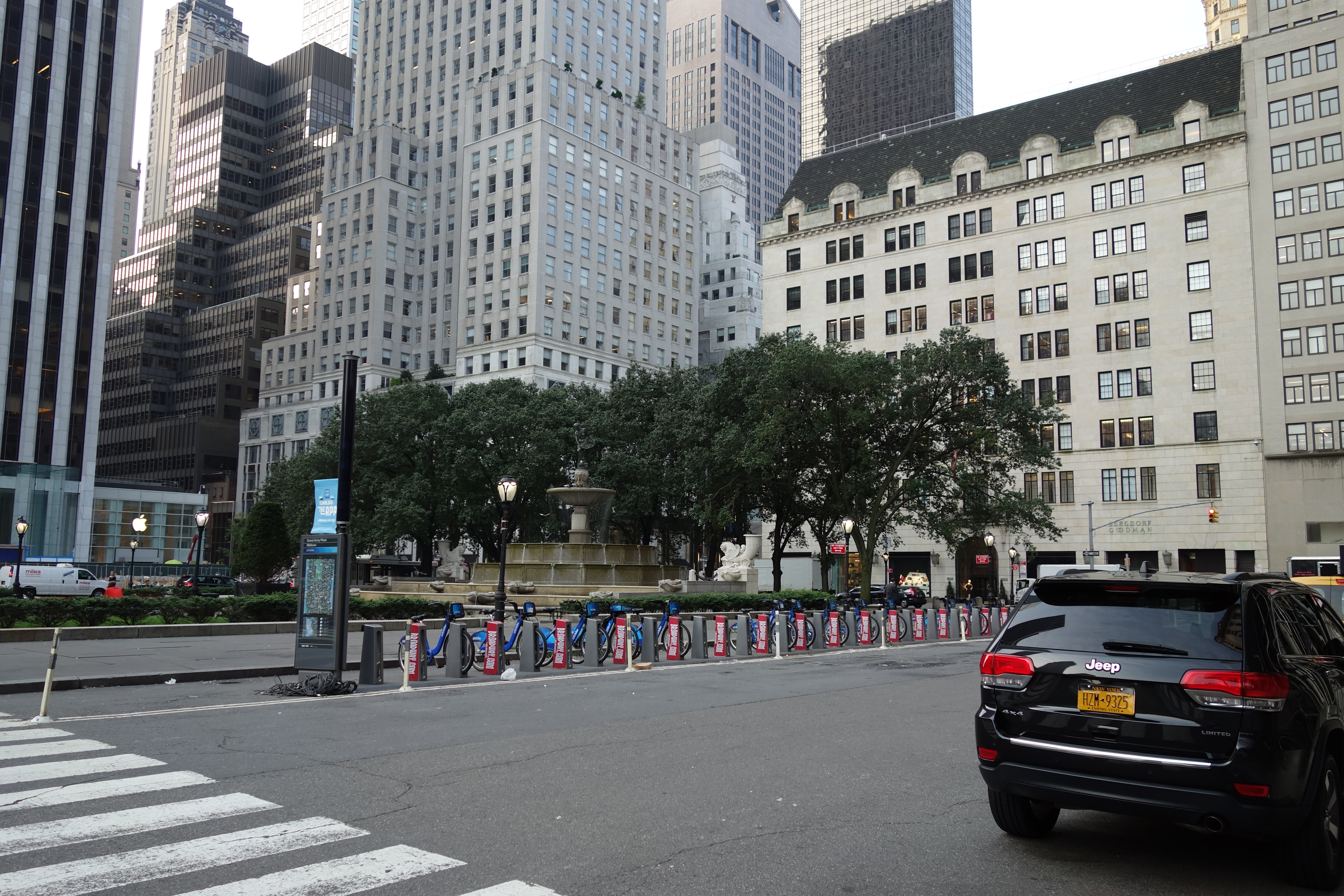
The Bergdorf Goodman Building (at right) as seen from Grand Army Plaza. In the center is the Squibb Building, which contains the Bergdorf Goodman men's store.

The Bergdorf Goodman Building was designed by the partnership of Buchman and Kahn. It was constructed as seven separate stores with similar facades. (Note: Architecture and Building magazine also cites a figure of six structures, while Robert A. M. Stern gives a figure of eight structures.) The design of the building was intended to evoke the architecture of the old Vanderbilt mansion. Though Bergdorf Goodman initially leased only the northernmost structure, the store gradually obtained the rest of the storefronts through the 1940s.

=== Facade ===
The design largely consists of French classical architectural elements, though there are also Art Deco–style motifs such as low relief ornamentation and decorative panels. The building is clad in white South Dover marble with bronze window frames, while the top of the building is within a green mansard roof. The building's white facade blended in with other structures along Grand Army Plaza, such as the Savoy-Plaza Hotel and the Plaza Hotel. The marble blocks contain orange, yellow, green, and black veins. Each of the storefront structures also has horizontally-aligned windows, protruding dormers, and a mansard roof; this was part of Kahn's efforts to create a building resembling "an elegant Parisian avenue". The roof is clad with slate, and it contains stone partitions that delineate the former boundaries of each storefront. There is a brick penthouse structure above the four southernmost pavilions, as well as a metal structure connecting the brick penthouse to the northern pavilion.

Originally, almost all of the structures had simple entrances and large display windows, except for the northernmost storefront. At Edwin Goodman's request, the northernmost structure contained rusticated marble blocks, French-style ornament, and a round archway. Over the years, the lowest two stories have been modified several times. The modern store has 35 ground-floor storefront display windows, which were installed during a 1984 renovation, replacing smaller windows. The storefront windows were typically changed once a week by the late 20th century, and they are often decorated with unconventional displays during major holidays. Bergdorf Goodman's original storefront occupied only the northernmost section of the building, with two display windows on Fifth Avenue and four on 58th Street. By the 2020s, the Bergdorf Goodman Building was one of the relatively few stores along Fifth Avenue that still had elaborate window displays.

==== 58th Street ====
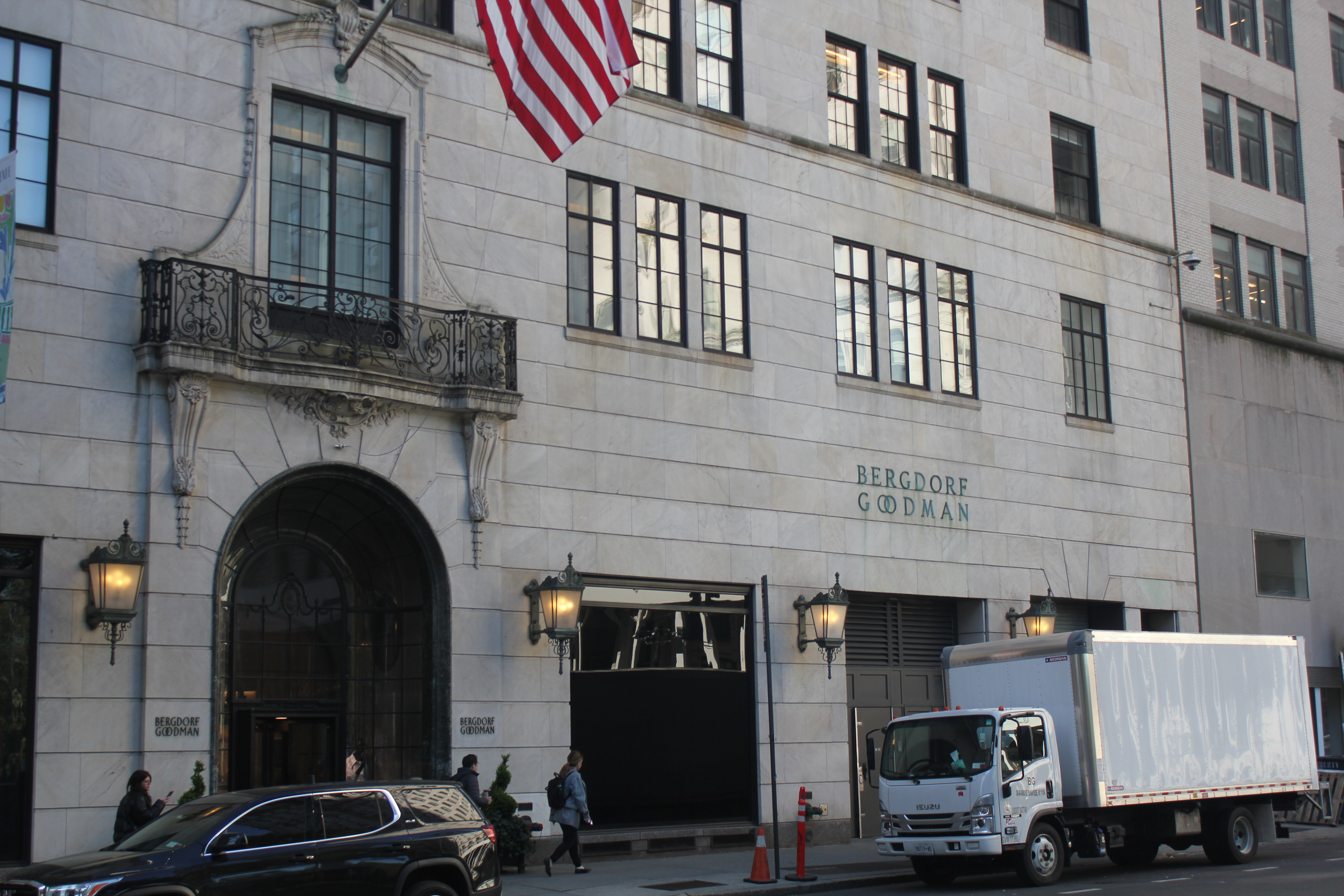
The entrance and storefront windows on 58th Street

Along the 58th Street elevation of the facade, the lowest two stories are clad in rusticated marble blocks above a granite water table. The Bergdorf Goodman store was originally accessed via two bronze doorways from the north wing. The arched entrance on 58th Street was built with curved glass-panels, and the doorway was enlarged during a 2003 renovation. The modern-day archway has a green marble frame with a revolving door surrounded by curved sidelights. There is a marble balcony directly above the archway, with brackets supporting a wrought iron railing. Behind the railing is a French window with a carved frame.

On the second through eighth stories, the facade is divided vertically into seven bays of sash windows. The outermost bays have one window per floor, while the inner bays have three windows per floors. At the third and eighth stories, band courses run horizontally across the facade (linking all the window sills), while on the other stories, each bay has its own window sill. There is a cornice with dentils just above the eighth floor. The ninth story is within the mansard roof and has dormer windows. The outermost dormers have one window each, which is topped by a triangular pediment, while the inner dormers have two windows each, which are topped by a curved pediment. Some of the windows have been modified over the years.

==== Fifth Avenue ====
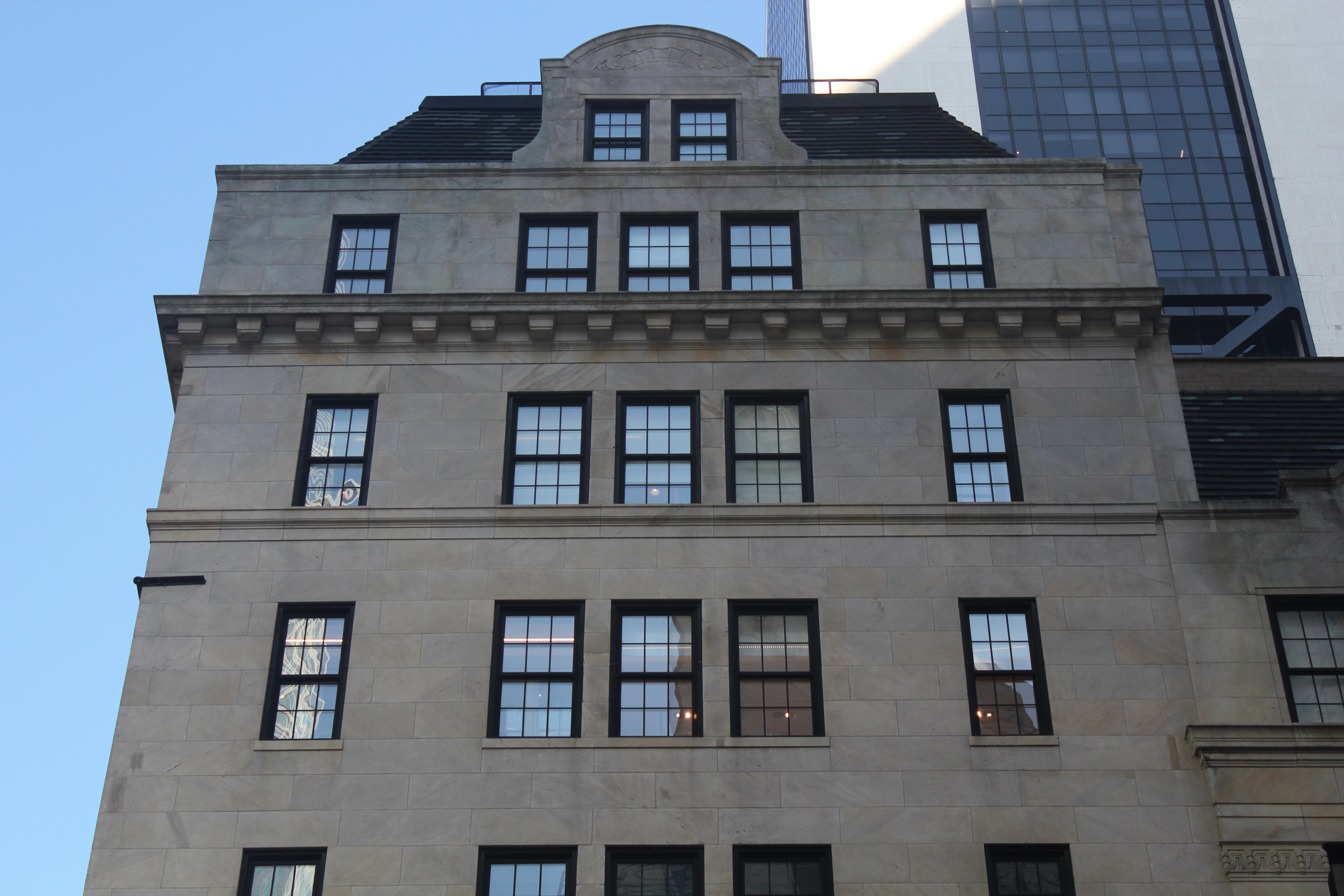
The southernmost pavilion on Fifth Avenue

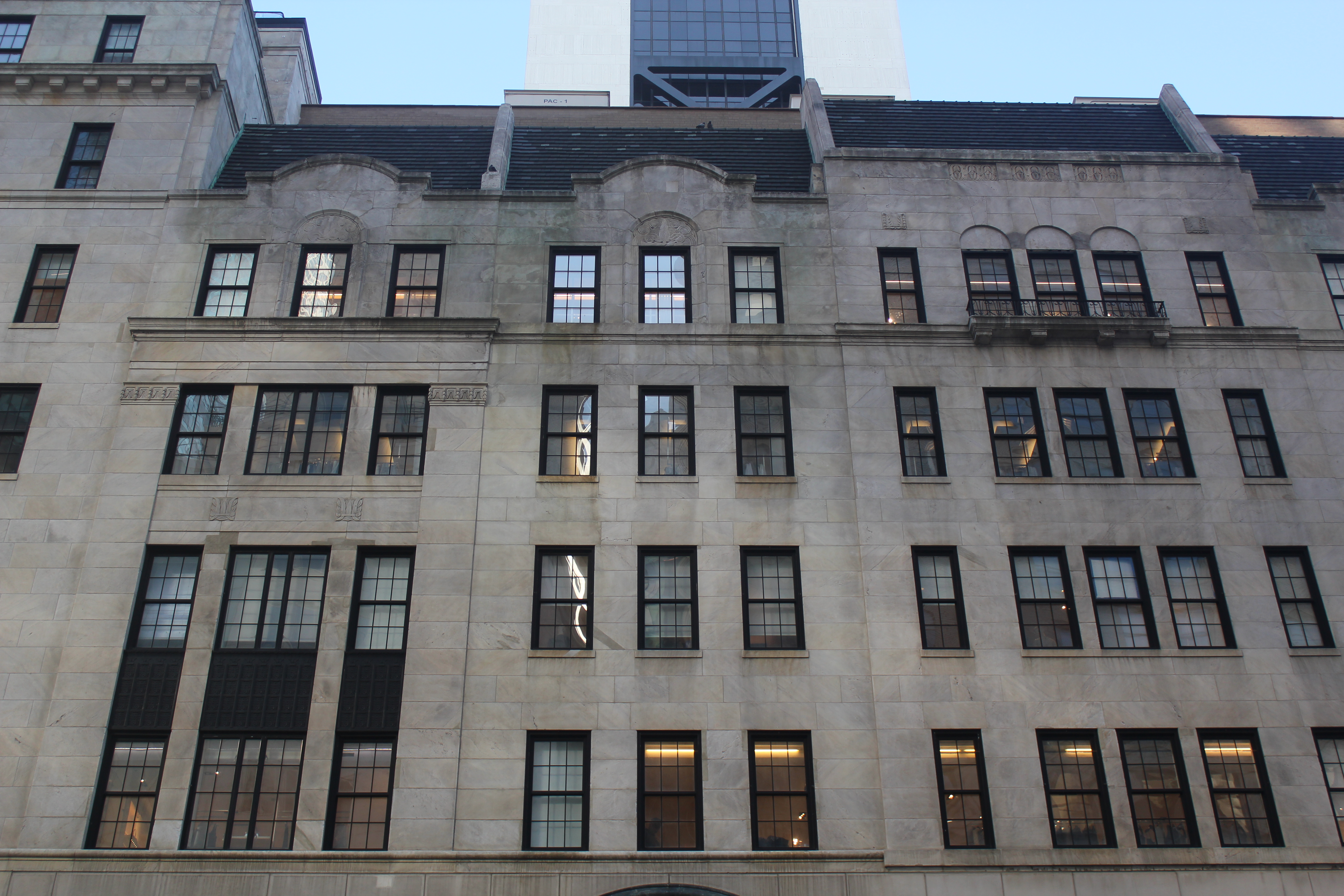
Three of the five central pavilions on Fifth Avenue. From left to right, these correspond to the "A"-type, "B"-type, and "C"-type storefronts.

The Fifth Avenue elevation is divided into seven pavilions. The northernmost structure (originally 754 Fifth Avenue) and southernmost structure (originally 742 Fifth Avenue) were built as end pavilions and are thus taller than the five storefronts in between. The five central storefronts, which originally carried the addresses 744–752 Fifth Avenue, have a symmetrical A-B-C-B-A design from south to north. The facades of each storefront have been modified throughout the years so they appear as a single building.

In the northern pavilion, the lowest two stories are rusticated similarly to the 58th Street facade, and there are two display windows flanking a round-arched entrance with a carved lunette. On the second through eighth stories, each story has a central bay of three windows, flanked on either side by a bay with one window. Similarly to the 58th Street elevation, there are band courses on the third and eighth stories, and each bay has its own window sill on the other stories. The ninth-story dormer has two windows and an arched pediment. The southern pavilion is similar in design, except at the ground level, where much of the original stonework is no longer extant. In addition, the entrance to the Van Cleef & Arpels store in the southern pavilion is through a rectangular doorway, and there is an oval window above it.

The five center pavilions are all six stories high, excluding the mansard roof. The current design of the center pavilions' lowest two stories dates to the building's mid-1980s renovation. As part of the renovation, the lowest two stories were clad in rusticated blocks, and an entrance was built at the base of one of the storefronts. The upper stories retain their original A-B-C-B-A design. The "A"-type storefronts are three bays wide and contain stone pilasters, metal spandrel panels above the third story, palmettes above the fourth story, an arched relief above the central sixth-story window, and an arched pediment. The "B"-type storefronts are similar in design, but they contain flat stone facades with window sills, rather than metal spandrels and palmettes. The "C"-type storefront in the center is five bays wide, with window sills, a balcony at the sixth story, and stone panels above the sixth-story windows.

==== 57th Street ====
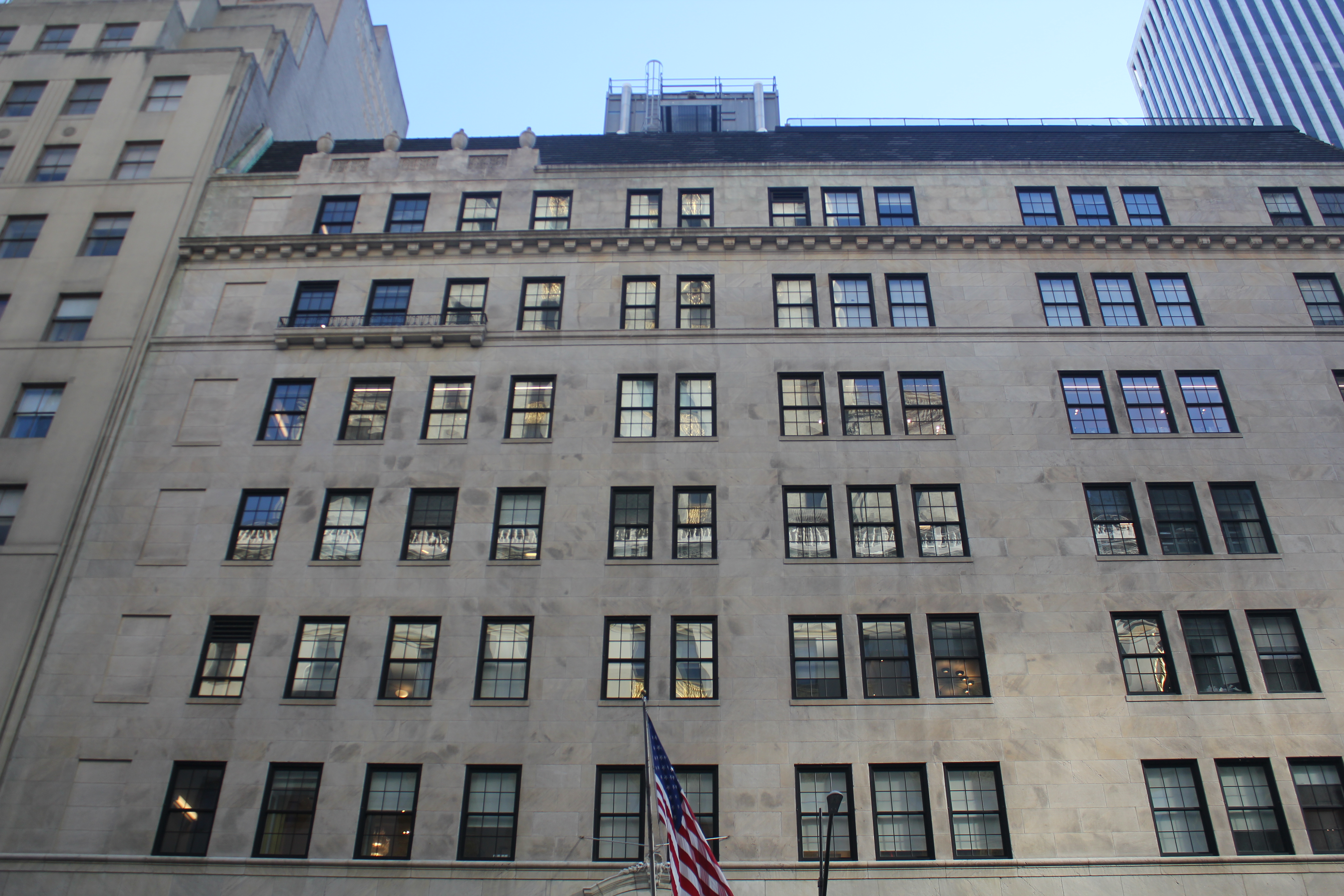
The 57th Street facade, which is asymmetrical. The five westernmost bays contain one window per floor. In the center bay, there are two windows per floor. The three easternmost bays (two of which are pictured) have three windows per floor.

The first story has been extensively modified over the years, with a facade made of marble. Much of the first story consists of display windows, and there is a service entrance as well. There is an arched entrance along 57th Street, designed in a similar manner to the 58th Street entrance. The archway is made of Alabama white marble, with elaborate carvings, and is topped by illuminated letters spelling out "Bergdorf Goodman".

Above the ground story, the 57th Street elevation is asymmetrical. In general, the five westernmost bays each contain a single window opening on each story (the westernmost bay contains blind openings instead of windows). In the second through fourth bays from the west, the seventh story has a balcony with a metal railing, while the eighth story is topped by urns and carved panels. Directly above the arched entrance, at the center of the facade, is a single bay of two windows. The three easternmost bays contain three windows per story. Similarly to the 58th Street elevation, there are band courses on the third and eighth stories, and each bay has its own window sill on the other stories. There is also a cornice with dentils above the eighth story.

=== Features ===
Initially, the structures functioned as separate stores and had their own elevators and stairs. The Bergdorf Goodman store initially occupied only the northern section of the building. The ground-level spaces are connected via ramps because Fifth Avenue slopes downward to the north. Above the street level, each of the storefronts' upper levels is at the same height. The interiors were built with high ceilings and few columns. Originally, the Bergdorf Goodman Building was divided into many small rooms. If the Bergdorf Goodman store had been unsuccessful, the spaces could have been leased out to smaller companies. Each floor spans approximately 25,000 square feet (2,300 m^{2}) and is designed in different materials and colors.

==== Bergdorf Goodman store ====
Theodore Hofstatter & Co. designed Bergdorf Goodman's original store in the Louis XV and Louis XVI styles, except for one Modern French-style salon. The interiors were designed to resemble those of wealthy customers' homes. On each story, decorations in different colors were hung from the ceiling, and there was also French period furniture. On the first floor was a room for perfume and accessories; a rotunda with display cases; and a millinery department. The rotunda was an elliptical space designed in the Empire style, while the other spaces mostly had traditional French decorations. The second through fourth floors had additional clothing departments and dressing rooms. On the fifth floor were the offices, while the sixth through eighth floors contained manufacturing. The ninth floor contained a penthouse for Edwin Goodman, the store's founder, which had 16 rooms and was accessed by an elevator. In the basement were two fur rooms, and there was also a mezzanine with employee areas.

Bergdorf Goodman expanded into 746 Fifth Avenue in 1951 and converted that storefront into five small shops around a tiled courtyard. The existing departments in the Bergdorf Goodman store were also expanded into the upper floors of number 746. The fifth and sixth stories were connected by a spiral stair in the 1960s. The first through sixth stories contained various departments by the 1980s; at the time, there was also a hairdressing salon and restaurant on the sixth floor, as well as a beauty salon on the seventh floor. There were escalators between the first and seventh floors, accessed via a hexagonal rotunda at the first story, in addition to boutiques on each story. The boutiques had different designs; for example, Angela Cummings's jewelry shop was decorated in gray and cream colors, while the Guerlain boutique had a French-style design with pink marble. There were designer salons on each floor by the 1980s, and the former Goodman penthouse was also converted into salons in the late 1990s. The building also displayed artists' work during the late 20th century. When the basement was converted into a beauty department in 1999, a hole was cut through the basement's ceiling to entice customers, though the hole was infilled in 2008.

In the 21st century, the building's lower stories were generally designed in a more formal style than the upper stories. Following a 2016 renovation, the first story's main floor is divided into multiple spaces with marble floors, gray decorations, and chandeliers, and there is a jewelry room with early-20th-century gem patterns. The designer boutiques on the second floor are decorated with an ebony trim, while the third story contains wooden floors, thin partition walls, and various boutiques next to the main selling area. The fourth-floor spaces have custom murals along with contemporary and antique furniture. The fifth floor has sliding wall panels and an undulating ceiling with brises soleil (sunshades), as well as art by Leo Villareal, Jon Kessler, Rob Pruitt, Ruth Root, and Beth Campbell. The sixth floor has white stone walls and floors, in addition to three boutiques, each with different designs. By 2019, the store consisted of six sales floors, plus a restaurant, event space, and salon on the top three floors. On the seventh floor is the BG Restaurant, an American cuisine cafe in a green-and-blue space designed by Kelly Wearstler. In addition, there is a cafe in the basement.

==== Former tenants ====
The southern portion of the structure at 742 Fifth Avenue originally was known as the Dobbs Building, after its original tenant, Dobbs & Co. The Dobbs store had an Italian-style entrance hall made of marble and Caen stone. The rest of the Dobbs store's first floor was also designed in the Italian style, with walnut paneling throughout. Executive offices and buyers' offices were placed on a mezzanine above the first floor. The three floors above were decorated in the Louis XV and Louis XVI styles, except for smaller rooms that had English-style decorations, and sold various clothes and accessories. On the fourth floor was an English walnut room and executive offices in the rear. In addition, there was a cafeteria, stock room, and hat-repair shop in the basement.

After Parke-Bernet took over 742 Fifth Avenue, the first floor included a Renaissance-style exhibit gallery and a library. The second floor became a salesroom, while the third and fourth stories were exhibit galleries; all three floors had 18th-century French decorations. The Tailored Woman occupied the first three floors of 742 Fifth Avenue between 1939 and 1967. The second floor was repainted green, while the third floor was repainted blue. When Mary Lewis Inc. leased 746 Fifth Avenue in 1944, the store had six dressing rooms on that building's first story, various departments on the second to fifth floors, and offices on the sixth floor. The basement of number 746 had receiving and shipping departments, and there was a roof garden.

== Impact ==
When the building was completed, Architecture and Building magazine wrote of the Bergdorf Goodman storefront: "The effect is of beautifully decorated and furnished salons wherein no merchandise is displayed." A 1986 article from The New York Times described the building as "a picture of monumental elegance on the [Grand Army] Plaza". The Wall Street Journal wrote in 1989 that the rotunda "evokes images of Versailles" and that "luxurious props abound, such as antique furniture and towering floral arrangements". The New Yorker wrote in 2012 that the ground floor had opulent "mirrors and chandeliers" in addition to upscale merchandise, while the upper stories had sunlight on three sides, "an amenity rare in New York". Architectural Digest, in its 2019 obituary of Bergdorf Goodman CEO Ira Neimark, said the building's interior "maintains its status as a frequent attraction for members of the design community" because of the 1980s renovations.

The New York City Landmarks Preservation Commission (LPC) considered designating the building as a city landmark in 1970. Bergdorf Goodman's president at the time, Andrew Goodman, opposed the designation, saying that such a designation would negatively impact the building's mortgages and ability to attract tenants. Because the LPC never rejected the landmark designation, the building remained on the LPC's list of potential landmarks for several decades. During the 1980s, preservationists had proposed designating the Bergdorf Goodman Building as a contributing property to a planned historic district along the midtown section of Fifth Avenue. The historic district was never created. In late 2015, the LPC again hosted a public hearing on whether to designate the Bergdorf Goodman Building as a landmark. This was part of a review of 95 listings that had been calendared by the LPC for several decades but never approved as city landmarks. The building became a city landmark in December 2016.

The Bergdorf Goodman Building has also been depicted in works of popular culture. For example, it was shown in a 1960s CBS special where Barbra Streisand performed on the store's main floor, and the 1984 film The Muppets Take Manhattan was shot there. It was also used as a filming location for the 2007 film The Nanny Diaries.

== See also ==
- List of New York City Designated Landmarks in Manhattan from 14th to 59th Streets
