= Praz-Delavallade =

Art gallery

- Established: 1990
- Website: www.praz-delavallade.com
- Field: Contemporary Art
- Paris
- 5, rue des Haudriettes, 75003 Paris
- Los Angeles
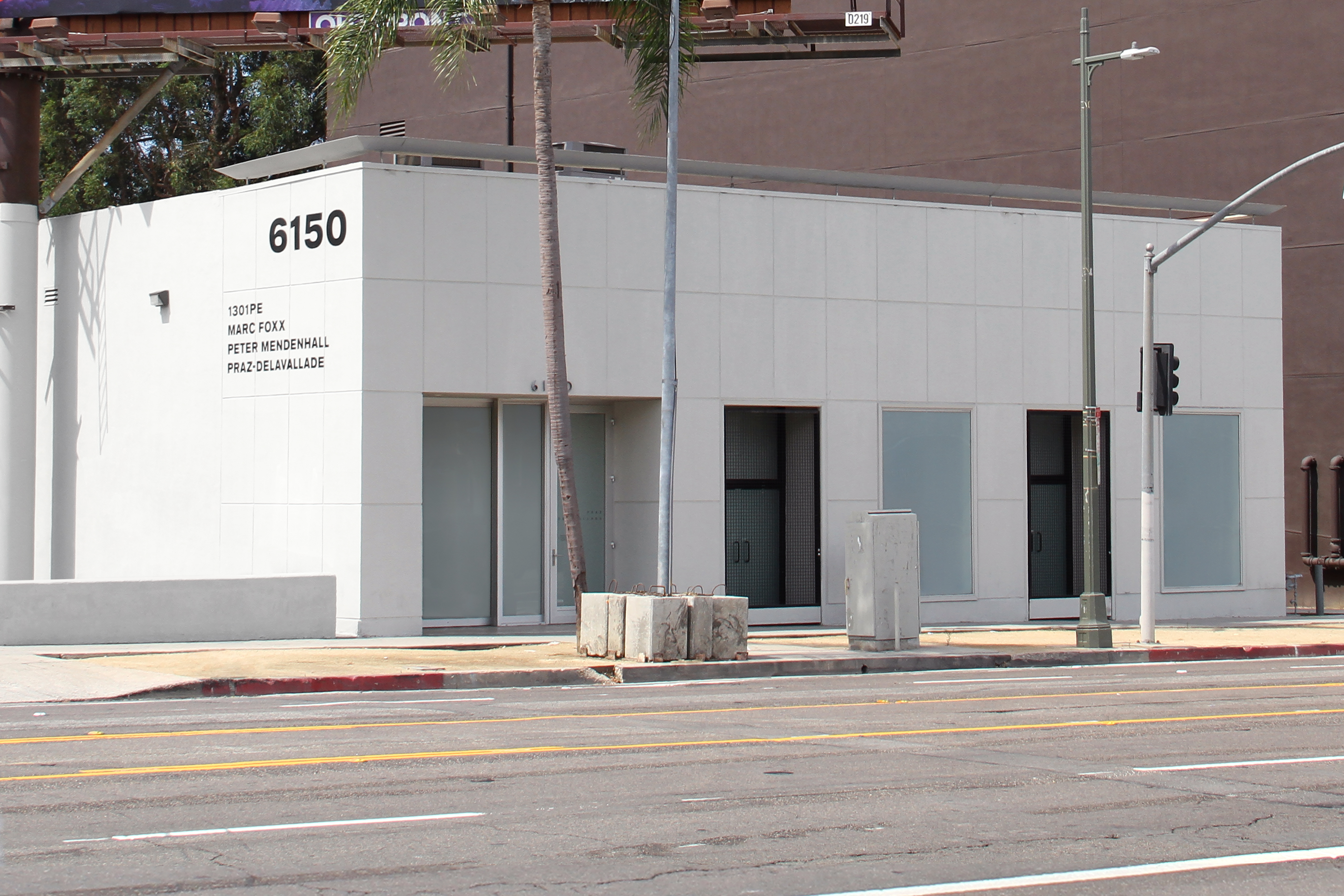
- 6150 Wilshire Blvd, Los Angeles CA 90048

Praz-Delavallade is a contemporary art gallery in Paris, France and Los Angeles, USA.

== History ==
Bruno Delavallade and René-Julien Praz opened Praz-Delavallade gallery in 1990 at its first location in La Bastille, Paris. In 1995 the gallery closed on the Right Bank and moved to a new location on the Left Bank at Rue Louis Weiss, part of an arts commune in conjunction with galleries Air de Paris, Almine Rech, Art: Concept, Jennifer Flay, Emmanuel Perrotin and Kréo. From 2007 to 2009, the gallery operated a space in Berlin in conjunction with Susanne Vielmetter; the gallery opened with a solo exhibition by Jim Shaw. In 2010, the gallery relocated to the Marais. In January 2017, Praz-Delavallade opened a new location in Los Angeles with "I LOVE L.A.", a group exhibition featuring work by local represented artists: Matthew Brandt, Matthew Chambers, Phil Chang, Sam Durant, EJ Hill, Julian Hoeber, Jim Isermann, Alexander Kroll, Joel Kyack, Dan Levenson, Nathan Mabry, Joe Reihsen, Ry Rocklen, Amanda Ross-Ho, Analia Saban, Jim Shaw, Marnie Weber and Brian Wills.

== Los Angeles Artists ==
Praz-Delavallade has been primarily defined by its relationship with Los Angeles-based artists and the representation of their work in Europe. The gallery came to be among the first to present the works of Sam Durant, Jim Isermann, Jim Shaw and Marnie Weber in Europe. Newer generations of artists have continued to expand the gallery's offerings including Matthew Brandt, Phil Chang, Alexander Kroll, Joel Kyack, Dan Levenson, Nathan Mabry, Joe Reihsen, Ry Rocklen, Amanda Ross-Ho and Brian Wills.

== Represented Artists ==
- Soufiane Ababri
- Pierre Ardouvin
- Matthew Brandt
- Phil Chang
- Heather Cook
- Philippe Decrauzat
- Sam Durant
- Thomas Fougeirol
- Jim Isermann
- Alexander Kroll
- Joel Kyack
- Dan Levenson
- Nathan Mabry
- Fabien Mérelle
- John Miller (American artist)
- Julien Nédélec
- Adi Nes
- Amy O'Neill
- Joe Reihsen
- Dario Robleto
- Ry Rocklen
- Amanda Ross-Ho
- Analia Saban
- Jim Shaw
- Marnie Weber
- Brian Wills
- Johannes Wohnseifer
- Guy Yanai
