= Charlene Gehm MacDougal =

American ballet dancer

Charlene Ghem MacDougal
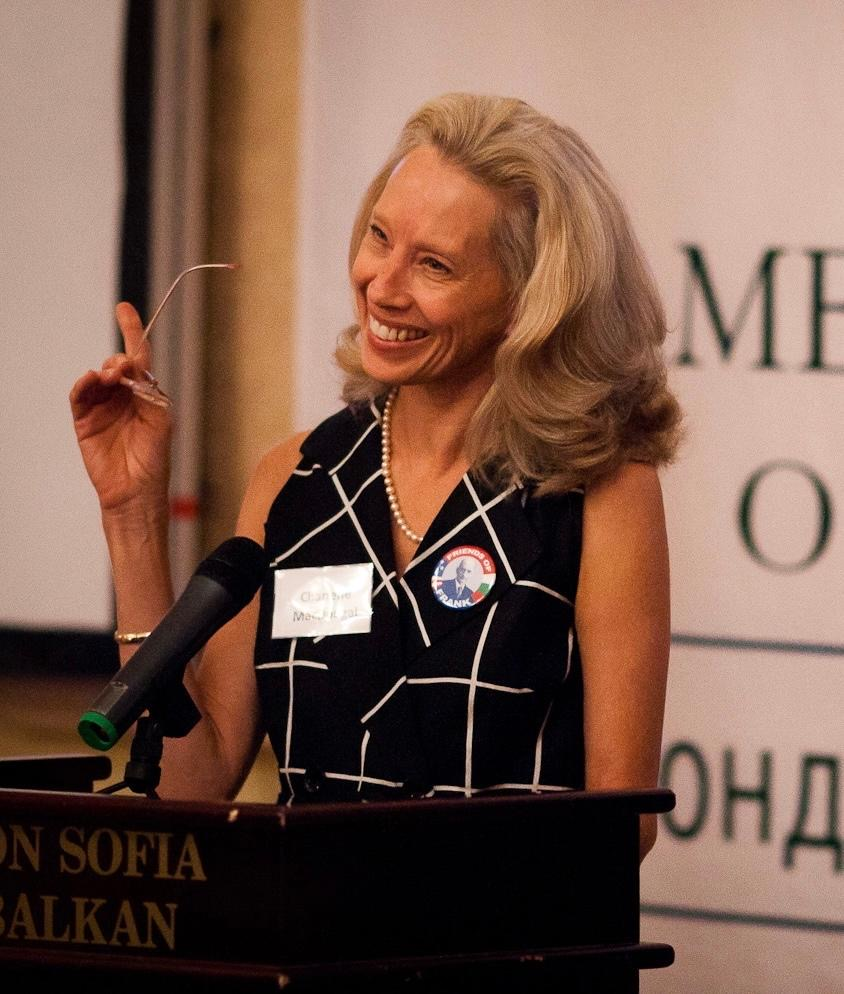
- MacDougal speaking in Bulgaria
- Born: Miami, Florida, U.S.
- Occupation: Ballet dancer
- Years active: 1971–1991
- Known for: Joffrey Ballet, Broadway

Charlene Gehm MacDougal (December 14, 1951 – January 10, 2021) was an American ballet dancer and actress. Best known for her tenure with the Joffrey Ballet, her career spanned multiple styles and stages, including ballet, Broadway, and international tours. Her artistry and versatility were widely praised by dance critics.

== Early life and education ==
Charlene Gehm was born on December 14, 1951, in Miami, Florida, to Verna Mae (Wiley) Gehm, a caterer, and Charles William Gehm, a high school chemistry teacher. She began dancing at age six, studying various styles at the Marion Lorraine Dance School. By the age of ten, following the death of her older sister in a car accident, Charlene devoted herself to dance, performing in Miami's tourist hotels in elaborately choreographed routines supported by her parents.

At 17, she earned a scholarship to the Harkness Ballet School in New York City, where her professional career began. She joined the Harkness Youth Dancers in 1969, under the guidance of mentor Ben Stevenson.

== Career ==
=== Ballet ===
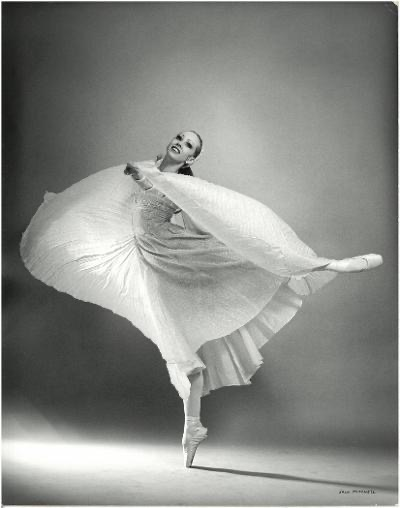
Charlene Gehm MacDougal

Gehm's ballet career involved a broad range of styles. She danced with the National Ballet of Washington, D.C. (1971–1973), the Chicago Ballet (1974), and Ballet de Caracas (1975) before joining the Joffrey Ballet in 1976. At first sight, Robert Joffrey signed Gehm to a long-term contract. In 1984, Joffrey told People Weekly, "At 5'7 and 110 pounds, she is the most gorgeous woman since Audrey Hepburn to put on leotards and tights."

Her 15-year tenure with the Joffrey Ballet showcased her versatility. Critics praised her ability to embody diverse roles, from the ethereal nymph in Nijinsky's L'Après-Midi d'un Faune to the comedic tipsy guest in Ashton's A Wedding Bouquet.

In A Wedding Bouquet, Gehm was praised by the New York Times for her ability as a dancer to make the audience laugh while doing it with "subtlety, grace - and a touch of the bittersweet".

Her collaborations with ballet dancers such as Rudolf Nureyev and her work in productions such as Romeo and Juliet, Rodeo, and Le Sacre du Printemps highlighted her technical skill and dramatic depth. William Forsythe praised her as "one of the most elegant dancers I have had the privilege to work with".

=== Broadway and modeling ===
In addition to her ballet, Gehm appeared on Broadway in West Side Story (1980) and The Phantom of the Opera.

She also modeled for Sergio Valente jeans, Capezio and Danskin dancewear, and Hallmark Cards. She also appeared in commercials for the Chi-Chi's restaurant chain.

== Later life and contributions ==
After retiring from professional dance in 1991, Charlene pursued higher education. She earned a bachelor's degree in arts administration from New York University in 1994, where she also delivered the commencement address. She later completed a master's degree in medieval studies at Columbia University in 1998, with her thesis on Canterbury Cathedral's stained glass windows.

Charlene was involved in philanthropy as president of the MacDougal Family Foundation. She supported arts education, provided scholarships for underprivileged students, and traveled extensively to promote cultural initiatives.

== Personal life and death ==
In 1992, she married Gary MacDougal, a businessman and philanthropist. The couple shared a commitment to education and cultural outreach, often traveling to Bulgaria to support the America for Bulgaria Foundation.

Charlene Gehm MacDougal died on January 10, 2021, from ovarian cancer.
