= Thomas Solomon =

Thomas Solomon may refer to:

- Thomas Solomon (magician) (born 1969), American escape artist and magician
- Thomas Solomon (art dealer) (born 1960), American art dealer and curator
- Thomas Solomon (footballer) in 2013 Torneo di Viareggio
- Tommy Solomon (1884–1933), last Moriori of unmixed ancestry
- Tommy Solomon (3rd Rock from the Sun)
- Tom Solomon, fictional character in The Five-Year Engagement
- Tom Solomon (neurologist), professor of neurology
