= Robert Levine =

Robert Levine may refer to:

- Robert Levine (artist), American artist and sculptor
- Robert A. Levine (1932–2023), American anthropologist
- Robert M. Levine (1941–2003), American historian
- Robert S. Levine, scholar of American and African American literature
- Robert V. Levine (1945–2019), American psychologist

== See also ==
- Robert Levien (1849–1938), Australian politician
- Robert Levin (disambiguation)
