= Dan Levenson (artist) =

American artist

Dan Levenson (born 1972) is a contemporary artist based in Los Angeles, California. He works in painting, sculpture, installation, performance and video.

== Early life and education ==
Levenson was born in New York City. He attended Oberlin College as an undergraduate and the Royal College of Art for graduate school.

== Work ==
Levenson's work involves a fictional Swiss art school based on the Bauhaus, Russian Constructivism, and the Abstraction-Création group. His work ties together themes of education, professionalization, utopia, freedom, labor, subjectivity, language, individualism, authorship, authenticity, theatricality, modernism, nationalism, and globalization. He is influenced by the legacy of institutional critique, especially the artists Andrea Fraser, Hans Haacke, Mel Bochner, and the art historian and critic Benjamin H. D. Buchloh.

== Exhibitions ==
Levenson has performed at the Hammer Museum, and has exhibited at Vielmetter Los Angeles, Praz-Delavallade, and the American Jewish University.
