= Joe Reihsen =

Joe Reihsen is a painter and sculptor based in Los Angeles, California, U.S.

== Biography ==
Reihsen was born in Blaine, Minnesota, U.S., in 1979. He currently lives and works in Los Angeles. He attended the San Francisco Art Institute, California, and received a BFA for painting and new genres in 2005, and a MFA at the University of California, Santa Barbara, in 2008. Reihsen founded JAM in 2003 for an exhibition at San Francisco's New Langton Arts. The program was designed to help average people attain success with art. JAM has traveled nationally, offering free workshops from 2003 until its final seminar at the University of California, Santa Barbara on September 19, 2006.

Reihsen uses a variety in thickness of paint to create textured abstract works which are simultaneously ethereal and dense.

== Selected exhibitions ==
- 2015 The Armory Show, with Praz-Delavallade, New York, New York
- Joe Reihsen, Praz-Delavallade @ Vedovi, Brussels, BE
- 2014 Factory Paint, Aftermarket Interior, Brand New Gallery, Milan, IT
- Aftermarket Interior, Factory Paint, Anat Ebgi, Los Angeles, California
- Solo presentation, Miart, Milan, IT
- 2013 Solo presentation, UNTITLED Miami, Miami Beach, Florida
- Solo presentation, NADA New York 2013, New York, New York
- Clean Title No Accidents, Anat Ebgi, Los Angeles, California
- 2011 Joe Reihsen, The Company, Los Angeles, California
- 2009 Preview, The Company, Los Angeles, California
- 2005 New Paintings, Artspace, San Francisco, California
- 2004 Swamp Machine, Diego Rivera Gallery, San Francisco, California

=== Selected group exhibitions ===
- 2014 Camel Blues, Kinman Gallery, London, UK
- Next, curated by Jean-François Bélisle, Arsenal, Montreal, QC
- Forms of Abstraction, curated by Susanne Van Hagen, Dickinson, London, UK
- Blue, ALAC, Los Angeles, California
- 2013 This is the story of America. Everybody’s doing what they think they’re supposed to do, Brand New Gallery, Milano, IT
- Dallas Art Fair, with Anat Ebgi, Dallas, Texas
- Le Fil Rouge, curated by Lucie Fontaine, with Anat Ebgi, ALAC, Los Angeles, California
- 2009 Invite, Circus Gallery, Los Angeles, California
- 2007 Mr. Nice Guy & Helper Outer, Performance by foot and limousine in Miami, Galerie Nuke, Paris, FR
- artLA with RFC, Los Angeles International Art Fair, Santa Monica Convention Center, Santa Monica, California
- 2006 Big Trouble in Little China. Mountain Bar, Los Angeles, California
- 2005 First Try, Warehouse 1310, San Francisco, California
- Joseph Reihsen. ArtSpace Chicago, Chicago, Illinois
- Truck You, Public exhibition, Seventh and Folsom, San Francisco, California
- 2003 Sliv and Dulet Presents: The Summer Line, New Langton Arts, San Francisco, California
