= John Bauer (American painter) =

American painter

- Born: 1971 (age 54–55)
- Known for: Painting

Untitled (#1409) by John Bauer, Honolulu Museum of Art

John Bauer (born 1971) is an American painter and artist based in San Diego. He received his BA in Studio Art in 1993 from the University of California, Santa Barbara.

Bauer uses screen printing, spray paint and stencils to create abstract paintings. His palette is almost exclusively blacks, silvers and greys. The work deals with the nature of fabricating and translating images. There is a tension between brushwork and more hands-off techniques in the paintings. The images in his compositions both dissolve and materialize simultaneously. Untitled (#1409), in the collection of the Honolulu Museum of Art, is an example of the artist's "black paintings", which have been described as "containing hints of abstract expressionism".

Solo shows include 2008 Maruani & Noirhomme gallery, Belgium; Patricia Low Contemporary, Gstaad, Switzerland; 2007 and 2003 at Bellwether Gallery in New York and 1998 at Clementine Gallery in New York. He has shown work in group exhibitions including "The Triumph of Painting" at the Saatchi Gallery, New York’s Finest at Canada Gallery in New York, and various group shows at the Bellwether Gallery. He is represented by Patricia Low Contemporary in Switzerland and Alain Noirhomme in Belgium.
