= Robert Levin =

Robert Levin may refer to:

- Robert Levin (musicologist) (born 1947), American pianist and composer
- Robert Levin (Norwegian pianist) (1912–1996), Norwegian pianist and composer
- Robert Levin (writer) (born 1939), American fiction writer
- Rob Levin (1955–2006), also known as lilo, founder of freenode
- Bobby Levin (born 1957), American bridge player

== See also ==
- Robert Levine (disambiguation)
