= Ellen Altfest =

American painter

- Born: New York City
- Education: BFA in Painting and BA in English from Cornell University; MFA in Painting from Yale; Studied at the Skowhegan School of Painting and Sculpture
- Known for: realist paintings
- Style: realist painting of still life and male figures
- Patrons: represented by White Cube in London
- Website: https://whitecube.com/artists/artist/ellen_altfest/

Ellen Altfest (born 1970 in New York City) is an American painter who lives and works in New York. She is best known for her realist depictions of landscapes and still lifes that often blur the distinction between the two genres.

== Education ==
Altfest graduated from Cornell University with a BFA in Painting and a BA in English, an MFA in Painting from Yale in 1997, and studied at the Skowhegan School of Painting and Sculpture in 2002.

== Artwork ==
According to art critic Randy Kennedy, Altfest is known for her "painstakingly labor-intensive canvases that look at things in the world." For example, while completing her 2013 work Tree, Altfest spent 13 months sitting in front of a tree trunk exploring the details. Altfest is also known for small-scale works. The previously mentioned Tree, an oil on canvas, is approximately the size of a piece of typing paper.

Altfest had ten works shown at Bellwether Gallery in 2005 at her "first New York gallery show." Altfest organized "Men," a group show in 2006 of ten paintings of men by ten different women artists at I-20. In 2007, London's White Cube gallery held a solo exhibition of her work which included the first extensive series of paintings of men. A monograph was released on the occasion of her exhibition at White Cube. Her work has featured in several prominent exhibitions, including "The Leg" at the Chinati Foundation in Marfa, Texas in 2010, "Head and Plant" at the New Museum in New York in 2012, "The Encyclopedic Palace" at the Venice Biennale in 2013, and a survey exhibition at the MK Gallery in Milton Keynes, United Kingdom in 2015.

Altfest's influences include Albrecht Dürer's The Large Turf, Jackson Pollock, Sylvia Sleigh, and Lucian Freud.

Altfest's works also include:

- Large Rock, (2002)
- Studio Window at Night, (2003)
- Tumbleweed, (2005)
- Two Logs, (2005)
- Penis, (2006)
- Reclining Nude, (2006-2007)
- Gourds, (2006-2007)
- Green Gourd, (2007)
- The Butt, (2007)
- The Bent Leg, (2008)
- Torso, (2010)
- Armpit, (2011)
- Abdomen, (2015)
