= Tanyth Berkeley =

American artist

Tanyth Berkeley (born 1969) is an artist and photographer based in Brooklyn, NY.

Berkeley was born in Hollywood, CA. She is best known for her portraits. Her subjects have included transgender women, buskers, people with albinism, and people she met on the subway in New York City. Her work has been exhibited at the Museum of Modern Art's "New Photography" exhibition in 2007 as well as at the Denver Museum of Contemporary Art and two solo exhibitions at Bellwether Gallery, New York.

Berkeley received a Master of Fine Arts degree from Columbia University in 2004.

== Selected exhibitions ==
2009

Grace, Danziger Project, New York

2007

New Photography, Museum of Modern Art, New York

The Muse, The Fugitive & The Frequency, Bellwether, New York

L’Autre, Rosenwald-Wolf Gallery, Philadelphia

2005

Beyond the Portrait, Piazza Oberdan, Milan

Greater New York, MOMA/PS1 Contemporary Art Center, New York

White Out, Denver Museum of Contemporary Art, Denver

2004

Flicker, Socrates Sculpture Garden, Long Island City

2002

A Special Place, Arena Gallery, Brooklyn

2001

Young Guns II, Art Director's Club, New York
