= Johannes Wohnseifer =

German artist

Johannes Wohnseifer (born 1967) is a German artist and painter based in Cologne.

== Early life and education ==
Wohnseifer was born in Cologne, Germany. He worked as an assistant to Martin Kippenberger from 1992 to 1997, during which time he began exhibiting internationally.

== Work ==
Wohnseifer often draws reference to the German history of his youth, such as the 1972 Summer Olympics and the Red Army Faction. For his 1999 solo exhibition Museum in the project room of the Museum Ludwig in Cologne, he covered the floor with panels painted in the colour scheme that designer Otl Aicher had developed for the 1972 Munich Olympics and presented sneaker prototypes he had designed for Adidas.

He creates smooth, glossy, billboard-like paintings. His installation Stacked Studio Lights (2010) consists of fluorescent lights programmed after recordings of the artist's sleep cycle, while the series Waking up in Paris (2010) presents postcards of the Eiffel Tower taken by German occupying soldiers during the Second World War. Wohnseifer has also published artist's books, including White Men (2009) with Verlag der Buchhandlung Walther König.

== Teaching ==
In the winter semester of 2011/12, Wohnseifer was appointed professor of painting and sculpture at the Academy of Media Arts Cologne (KHM). As of 2026, he continues to hold the professorship.

== Exhibitions ==
Wohnseifer has exhibited in shows including Irresistible Impulse at Galerie Gisela Capitain in Cologne, Intervention at Sprengel Museum in Hanover, Hein, Schellberg, Wohnseifer at Schnittraum in Cologne. He has shown at the Hara Museum of Contemporary Art in Tokyo, Union Gallery in London and Galerie Yvon Lambert in Paris.

== Art market ==
Wohnseifer is represented by Casey Kaplan in New York, Johann König in Berlin, Praz-Delavallade in Paris/Los Angeles and Nicolas Krupp in Basel.

== Awards ==
- 1998: Peter Mertes Stipendium, Bonner Kunstverein
- 2000: Förderpreis der Stadt Köln
- 2001: Ars viva prize of the Kulturkreis der deutschen Wirtschaft

== Collections (Selection) ==
- Museum of Modern Art. New York
- Christian Boros. Germany
- Museum Folkwang. Essen
- Museum Ludwig. Cologne
- Saatchi Collection. London
- Hauser & Wirth Collection. Zurich
- Julia Stoschek Collection. Düsseldorf
- Kunstmuseum Bonn
