= John Barrett (salon) =

Beauty and hair salon, New York

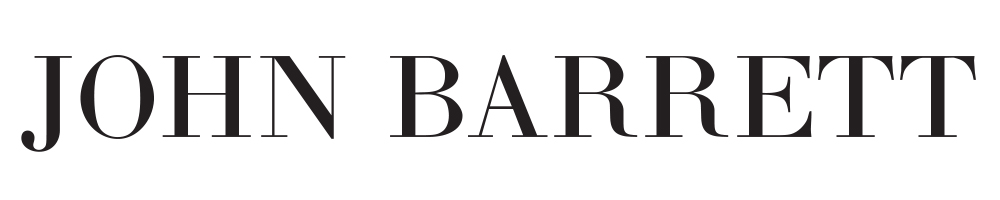
- Type: Private
- Industry: Beauty salon
- Founded: 1996
- Founders: John Barrett
- Headquarters: New York City, United States
- Brands: The John Barrett Salon at Bergdorf Goodman, John Barrett Bond Street, John Barrett Palm Beach
- Services: High-End Hair Styling, Cutting, Coloring, Highlights, Blowouts, Treatments, Relaxing, Braiding, Ponytails, Spa Therapies, Makeup, Nails,
- Website: johnbarrett.com

John Barrett is the eponymous brand of beauty and hair salons by hairstylist John Barrett. The salon opened in the penthouse of Bergdorf Goodman Building in 1996.

== John Barrett ==
John Francis Barrett (1957–2023) was an Irish-born American hair stylist, known as the founder of the John Barrett (salon)|John Barrett salon and brand. Born in Limerick, Ireland, to John Barrett, a laborer, and Philomena (Maroney) Barrett, a homemaker, he was one of ten siblings and grew up in poverty. Around the age of 13, Barrett moved to London in search of work and initially earned a living selling souvenirs on Oxford Street.

Barrett began his hairdressing career by responding to an advertisement for an assistant position at Michaeljohn salon, which served clients such as Mick Jagger and Liza Minnelli. By the mid-1970s, he had established himself as a stylist. An encounter with Elizabeth Taylor, who was seeking a stylist named John and selected him for an appointment, further increased his profile.

His career spanned several major cities. Barrett spent part of the 1980s in Los Angeles, returned to London, and settled in New York in the early 1990s, where he worked with Frédéric Fekkai. Following an interaction with Dawn Mello, then-president of Bergdorf Goodman, he secured a penthouse salon space in the store's former founder's residence. Later, he introduced salon concepts such as a "ponytail bar" and a "braid bar," and offered personalized services, including house calls. Between 2014 and 2016, he operated a satellite salon in Palm Beach, Florida.

Barrett was open about his struggles with alcoholism, which he overcame in 1987. He organized charity events and provided counseling to individuals dealing with addiction.

After another stint back in London, Barrett moved to New York in the early 1990s. In 1996, Barrett was chosen to open his own salon at the Bergdorf Goodman Building. This penthouse space—formerly the famous Goodman apartment—offers views of Central Park. The interior of the salon was designed by David Collins.

== John Barrett Salon ==
In 2011, Barrett launched a service called the Braid Bar in the salon, later renamed as Barrett's Braids. It is for clients that want to have their hair braided. John Barrett was the first salon to introduce the concept of a braid bar in 2011 and received a lot of media coverage for it. Three editors from the People magazine went to the braid bar in 2013 and reviewed that, "The three of us got so many compliments that it made the cost seem totally worth it." "If you’re stuck in a hair rut, a braid bar is the place for you. John Barrett Salon will have you ready for a girls’ night out in no time!" wrote Latina magazine.

A ponytail bar has also opened in the salon. The ponytail bar has also been reviewed by multiple media outlets.

In 2020, the salon filed for Chapter 11 bankruptcy.

== John Barrett Brand ==
John Barrett also manufacturers and markets a collection of hair care products.

John Barrett is also the author of "Hair," published in 2016 by Assouline.

== In the media ==
Isabella Behrens, fashion market editor at Vanity Fair visited the salon and wrote "the sophisticated staff makes you feel so incredibly at ease. You will never want to go anywhere else. Can you already tell I am a John Barrett junkie?” Vogue wrote about the salon that "Barrett’s stylists can do everything from the artfully undone (bringing to mind the fall Lanvin and Rag & Bone shows) to the intricate and impeccable."

In 2014, the Neroli Portofino pedicure at John Barrett was featured in Vogue's Guide to the Country's Best Pedicure Salons. It was also featured by W Magazine in Best Pedicure Destinations in New York City in 2014.
