= Gary MacDougal =

Executive, consultant and writer

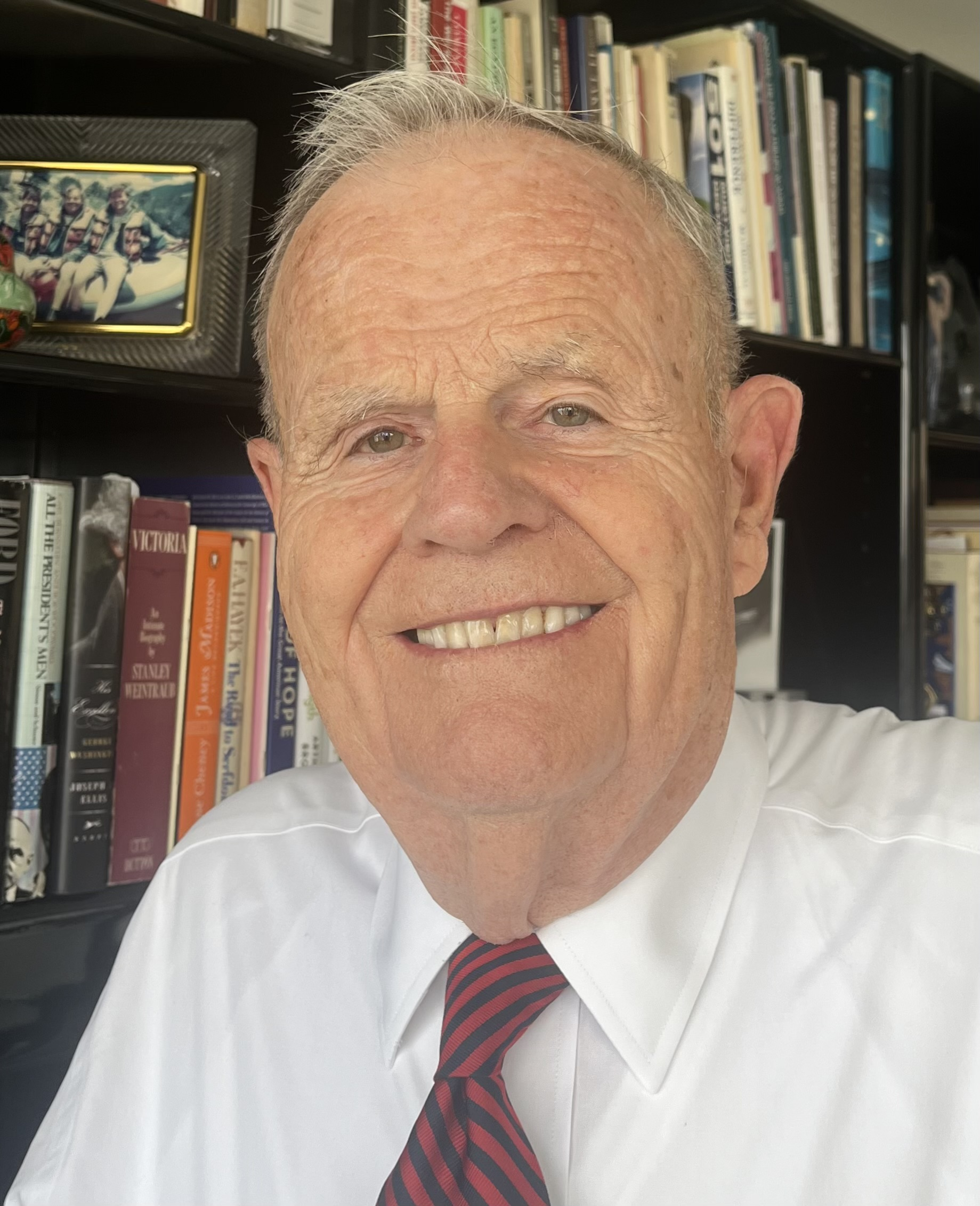

Personal details
- Born: Gary Edward MacDougal; July 3, 1936 (age 90) Chicago, Illinois
- Party: Republican
- Spouse(s): Charlene Ghem, m. June 15, 1992, died January 10, 2021
- Children: Gary Edward Jr. Michael Scott
- Education: UCLA (B.S.); Harvard University (M.B.A)
- Website: www.macdougal.com

Gary Edward MacDougal (born July 3, 1936) is an American businessman, writer, foundation director, former arts executive, and political leader, who works with community leaders, non-profits, governors, and legislatures, to assist the economically disadvantaged move from dependency to self-sufficiency. He is a former partner of McKinsey & Company, an international management consulting firm. For 18 years Mr. MacDougal was Chairman and Chief Executive of Mark Controls Corporation, a leading manufacturer and installer of building control systems and manufacturer of flow control equipment for the petroleum, chemical and power industries. Mark Controls grew internally and through acquisitions to become ranked #687 in the Fortune 1000, and listed on the New York Stock Exchange with 5,000 employees and factories around the world. He is also a founder of the $450 million America for Bulgaria Foundation (Chicago, Illinois, and Sofia, Bulgaria) which has a special focus on the economically disadvantaged and is thought to be the largest foundation in Eastern Europe. He is also an Advisory Director of Saratoga Partners, LLC.

== Early life ==
Gary MacDougal was born in Chicago Illinois, attended grade school and his first year of high school in Westfield, New Jersey, completing high school in Los Angeles, California, and graduating with a BS in Engineering from the University of California at Los Angeles in 1958. He served in the Navy as the Engineering Officer on two destroyers in the Atlantic fleet for three years before attending Harvard Business School, from which he graduated with distinction in 1963.

== Career ==
MacDougal joined McKinsey & Company in 1963 and was elected a partner in 1968. While at McKinsey he had responsibility, together with another partner, for the firm's merger/acquisition and finance practice. In 1969 he left McKinsey to become CEO of Clayton Mark and Company (name later changed to Mark Controls Corporation). Prior to MacDougal's joining the company it lost money in six of the ten preceding years (1960–1969). During MacDougal's tenure as CEO, investors achieved more than a seventeenfold increase, with the stock rising from $10 per share in 1959 to more than $170 per share in October 1987 (adjusted for splits). Investors experienced growth of over 17% per year compounded (including dividends) over the eighteen-year period. In 1987, he turned over CEO responsibilities to a long-time partner and became honorary chairman of the Board of Mark Controls. MacDougal was a director of United Parcel Service for 34 years where he was chairman of the finance committee, as well as the nominating and governance committees. While chairman of the UPS finance committee he helped lead the UPS initial public stock offering (IPO), then the largest in the history of wall street. He also served on the board of the following New York Stock Exchange listed corporations: Union Camp Corporation (forest products), AM International (printing equipment), CBI Industries (industrial construction and commercial gases), Sargent Welch Scientific (laboratory equipment), Maremont Corporation (automotive equipment) and The France Fund (mutual Fund).

== Foundations and the arts ==
MacDougal served as a trustee and chairman of the Russell Sage Foundation (New York), a major funder of social science research, with a primary focus on problems of poverty. He was for many years a trustee of the Annie E. Casey Foundation with a mission to help move disadvantaged children and families from dependency to self-sufficiency. He is also a former trustee of the W.T. Grant Foundation, working in the area of child development and the problems of disadvantaged children.

The New York City Ballet selected MacDougal as General Director in 1990, reporting, along with the artistic director, to the NYCB Board of Directors. In addition to general management, his activities included leading a long range planning process and creating a marketing function and establishing and implementing a code of conduct. He also represented the New York City Ballet on the Lincoln Center Board of Directors.

== Politics and government ==
Mr. MacDougal chaired the Illinois Governor's Task Force for Human Services Reform from 1993 to 1997, which developed and implemented a major reorganization of the Illinois human services systems to better integrate services, connect with communities and measure outcomes with the overreaching goal of helping people move from dependency to self sufficiency. An integrated Illinois Department of Human Services was created from the six separate uncoordinated departments. Upon signing the bill, Governor Edgar described it as the "biggest reorganization of state government since 1900". Illinois then led the nation by reducing welfare roles 95% in the subsequent 10 years (from August 1996 to September 2016) with most going to work. This work has been described in columns by Pulitzer Prize winners David Broder and Clarence Page.

In early 1988, Mr. MacDougal joined the Bush Presidential Campaign. MacDougal was subsequently was appointed by then Vice President George H. W. Bush as assistant campaign manager and senior advisor, where he had responsibility in the areas of management, policy and finance. In June 1988 when the campaign was down 17 points to Michael Dukakis, Vice President Bush asked Mr. MacDougal to undertake a management review of the campaign that led to a report and reorganization which contributed to President Bush's victory as described in The Man Who Ran Washington: The Life and Times of James A. Baker III (Anchor Books, 2021) pp. 295–296.

MacDougal was an exploratory candidate for the US Senate from Illinois in 1989, withdrawing at the request of President Bush, and was also a US Senate candidate in 1992 where, according to a book by NY Times journalists Jane Mayer and Jill Abramson, MacDougal's candidacy was sacrificed by the White House in return for a crucial vote by his opponent, Illinois Senator Alan Dixon (D-IL), to approve Clarence Thomas for the US Supreme Court.

Mr. MacDougal was appointed by President George H.W. Bush as a public delegate of the United States to the United Nations for the 44th General Assembly session where, among other responsibilities, he served as liaison to the East Bloc countries. The U.S. Senate confirmed him on November 19, 1989. President Bush subsequently appointed MacDougal to the US Commission on Improving the Effectiveness of the United Nations. He also served on the US secretary of labor's Commission on Workforce Quality and Labor Market Efficiency.

In November 1991, after the Berlin Wall and the Iron Curtain came down, Mr. MacDougal was chosen by President George H.W. Bush to be chairman of the $55 million Bulgarian American Enterprise Fund (BAEF), established to invest in and encourage entrepreneurship and free markets in Bulgaria. Mr. MacDougal had previously been the first "free market" speaker at the Karl Marx University (now the University of National and World Economy) in Sofia resulting from his work at the United Nations. The BAEF created thousands of jobs for Bulgarians, opened up new markets, and grew at a rate in excess of 17% per year to a value of more than $450 million.

Mr. MacDougal is currently founder and chairman emeritus of the America for Bulgaria Foundation (www.us4bg.org), which assumed the BAEF assets. The ABF, based in Chicago and Sofia, has a mission of strengthening U.S. Bulgaria relations and continuing to help Bulgaria move to a free market economy through grants strengthening Roma education; anti-corruption efforts and employment initiatives, among other activities.

MacDougal served as chairman of the Illinois Republican Party during the 2002 gubernatorial campaign where he rebuilt party finances and earned a reputation for attacking “bipartisan sleaze” in Illinois.

== Writing and speaking ==
MacDougal is the author of: Make A Difference: A Spectacular Breakthrough in the Fight Against Poverty (St. Martin's Press: 2000, paperback 2005). He has published numerous articles on poverty and other topics in the Wall Street Journal, The New York Times, The Washington Post, The Chicago Tribune, The Chicago Sun Times and The Harvard Business Review, among others. He has spoken on moving people from dependency to self-sufficiency and other topics at leading think tanks and universities including; UCLA, Harvard's Kennedy School, University of Chicago, Northwestern University, Georgetown University, The Brookings Institution, The Heritage Foundation, and The American Enterprise Institute.

== Awards and honors ==
As Chief Engineer of the USS Cassin Young (DD793), Ensign MacDougal received a letter of commendation when the ship was awarded the Battle Efficiency “E” by the Commander of the Sixth Fleet (Mediterranean) as the outstanding ship in the squadron. At McKinsey & Company he received the annual Horace Guy Crockett award for the best article published by a McKinsey consultant. MacDougal was selected “Alumnus of the Year” by the UCLA School of Engineering and Applied Science (SEAS) and was SEAS graduation speaker. He was also selected as graduation speaker for the Northwestern University Kellogg Graduate School of Management and by UCLA's College of Arts and Sciences. Mr. MacDougal was honored with the “President’s Medal” from the President of Bulgaria for his contribution “creating thousands of jobs” and “strengthening ties between Bulgaria and America”.

== Personal ==
MacDougal was married for 30 years to former Joffrey ballerina, Nureyev partner and Broadway dancer Charlene Gehm. Charlene graduated with a BA from New York University and an MA in medieval studies from Columbia University. Charlene died from ovarian cancer January 10, 2021. He has two sons, Gary Jr., and Michael.

He is a member of the Chicago Club, Harvard Club of New York City, the Council on Foreign Relations and the Author's Guild and is a former director of the Economic Club of Chicago.
