= Dana Frankfort =

American painter

- Born: 1971 (age 54–55); Houston
- Education: Brandeis University, Yale School of Art, Skowhegan School of Painting and Sculpture
- Known for: Painting, Visual arts
- Awards: Guggenheim Fellowship, 2006

Dana Frankfort (born 1971 in Houston, Texas) is an artist based in Houston and a painting professor at University of Houston. Her work often engages with the history of abstract art and features bright colors, gestural brushwork, and text.

== Early life and education ==
Dana Frankfort was born in Houston, Texas, in 1971. She earned a Bachelor of Arts in Art History from Brandeis University in 1995 and a Master of Fine Arts from the Yale School of Art in 1997. In the same year she also studied at Skowhegan School of Painting and Sculpture in Skowhegan, Maine. From 1999 to 2000, she was a Core Fellow at the Glassell School of Art at the Museum of Fine Arts, Houston.

== Career ==
Frankfort’s paintings have been shown widely in solo and group exhibitions in the United States and abroad. Her work has been included in major group exhibitions such as Abstract America: New Painting from the U.S. at the Saatchi Gallery in London (2009–10) and locally in Learning by Doing: 25 Years of the Core Program at the Museum of Fine Arts, Houston. She has had solo exhibitions at galleries and institutions including Inman Gallery (Houston), James Harris Gallery (Seattle), Southwest School of Art (San Antonio), Sorry We’re Closed (Brussels), Bellwether Gallery (New York), and Kantor/Feuer Gallery (Los Angeles).

Frankfort’s work often incorporates gestural paint handling and layered text, where letters and words intertwine with abstract color fields. Critics have noted her use of language as both a structural element and a visual presence that interacts with painterly gestures.

In recent years, her work has continued to garner critical attention; for example, her 2024 exhibition Life and Death was exhibited at Olympia and reviewed in contemporary art publications, highlighting her sustained experimentation with text, form, and atmospheric color.

== Academic and Teaching Work ==
Frankfort serves as an Associate Professor of Painting at the University of Houston, where she teaches studio and conceptual courses. Her teaching emphasizes critical thinking in the development of artistic practice.

== Awards and Honors ==
- John Simon Guggenheim Memorial Foundation Fellowship (2006).
- Artadia Award (Houston, 2018).

== Collections and Exhibitions ==
She has shown work internationally in exhibitions including What’s So Funny at Brooklyn Fireproof and The Triumph of Painting at the Saatchi Gallery in London. Her work was included in several exhibitions at The Jewish Museum and her work Star of David (Orange) is part of The Jewish Museum's permanent collection.
