= Ruth Root =

American painter

- Born: 1967 (age 58–59); Chicago, Illinois, U.S.
- Education: Brown University; Art Institute of Chicago; Skowhegan School of Painting and Sculpture
- Known for: Painting
- Website: www.ruthroot.com/bio

Untitled by Ruth Root, 2005, Honolulu Museum of Art

Ruth Root (born 1967 in Chicago, USA) is an American artist based in New York.

== Education ==
Root graduated from Brown University, Rhode Island, in 1990, and completed her MFA at the Art Institute of Chicago in 1993. She attended a residency at the Skowhegan School of Painting and Sculpture in 1994.

== Work ==
Her work includes paintings on canvas, paintings on thin, irregularly shaped pieces of aluminium and small painted paper pieces.

Root has participated in a number of exhibitions including Abstract Redux at the Danese Gallery in New York, Kosmobiologie at the Bellwether Gallery in Brooklyn, and Son-of-a-Guston at Clementine Gallery in New York. She has exhibited internationally at galleries such as Galerie Nikolaus Ruzicska in Austria, Galeria Marta Cervera in Spain, Seattle Art Museum, and Galleria Franco Noero, in Torino, Italy.

The artist's paintings are primarily hard-edge abstractions, consisting of rectangles and other simple shapes in a limited brightly colored palate. In paintings from the early 2000s, eyes or a cigarette was added to these otherwise abstract canvases. Untitled from 2005, in the collection of the Honolulu Museum of Art, is an example of this phase of Root's oeuvre. A pair of eyes mysteriously peer out from a dark blue expanse. The Hirshhorn Museum and Sculpture Garden, the Honolulu Museum of Art, the Los Angeles County Museum of Art the Museum of Modern Art, the Seattle Art Museum, and the Walker Art Center are among the public collections holding work by Ruth Root. She is represented by the Andrew Kreps Gallery in New York, Maureen Paley in London and Galerie Nikolaus Ruzicska in Salzburg.

== Awards ==
- 2026: Cultural Space Subsidy Program Grant
- 2018: Academy’s 2018 Art and Purchase Awards
- 1996: National Endowment for the Arts, Mid-Atlantic Grant in Painting
- 1996: New York Foundation for the Arts Fellowship in Painting
