= Ion Birch =

American painter

Ion Birch (born 1971 in New York, NY) is a contemporary American artist, he graduated from the Rhode Island School of Design in 1994.

== Work ==
Birch has worked in the mediums of drawing and painting, he is best known for his graphite on paper works which incorporate phallic symbols and other erotic imagery. He has stated that these works are a meditation on the nature of repression. Birch has been grouped within broader trends of figurative and conceptual art that focus on contemporary perceptions of the body and sexuality.

== Exhibitions ==
- Solo Exhibitions:
  - 2014 Holy Man, Horton Gallery, New York, NY
  - 2007 The Spiraling Sun, Freight + Volume, New York, NY
  - 2003 Policeworms, Neon Gallery Brösarp, Brösarp, Sweden
  - 2003 The Young Penis, Bellwether, Brooklyn, NY
  - 2001 Bronwyn Keenan Gallery, New York, NY
  - 2000 Margrett, New York, NY
- Group Exhibitions & Projects:
  - 2015 Vis-á-vis, Cur. Michael Mahalchick, Andrew Edlin Gallery, New York, NY
  - 2011 Romantic Agony, Horton Gallery, New York, NY
  - 2011 Sick, Cur. Meghan Carleton & Max Wolf, Misc. New York, NY
  - 2011 The Perfumed Handkerchief, Cur. Alison Ward, Flux Factory, Long Island City, NY
  - 2011 Pornucopia, Alegra La Viola Gallery, New York, NY
  - 2011 Private Future, Cur. Michael Cline, Marc Jancou Contemporary, New York, NY
  - 2011 Sex Drive, Cur. Stuart Horodner, Cantor Fitzgerald Gallery Haverford College, Haverford, PA
  - 2009 Reconfiguring the Body in American Art, National Academy of Art, New York, NY
  - 2008 In Your Face, Buia Gallery, New York, NY
  - 2008 Desire, Art Forum Berlin, Freight + Volume, Berlin, Germany
  - 2008 Timeless: The Art of Drawing, Morris Museum, Morristown, NJ
  - 2007 Big Secret Cache, Angstrom Gallery curated by David Quadrini, Los Angeles, CA
  - 2006 FIAC, Freight + Volume, Paris, France
  - 2006 Yankee Doodle Flea Market & Art Show, Cur. United Bamboo & James Fuentes, Hillside Plaza, Tokyo, Japan
  - 2006 Little Man, Freight + Volume, New York, NY
  - 2006 Art LA, Freight + Volume, Los Angeles, CA
  - 2005 FIAC, Freight + Volume, Paris, France
  - 2005 Ab Ovo, Cur. Steven Hull, Steven Wolf Fine Arts, San Francisco, CA
  - 2005 Stick/Figure, Showroom MAMA, Rotterdam, The Netherlands
  - 2005 Inter-States, DNA Gallery, Provincetown, MA
  - 2005 Contemporary Erotic Drawing, Diverseworks, Houston, TX, The Aldrich Contemporary Art Museum, Ridgefield, CT
  - 2004 The Armory Show, Bellwether, New York, NY
  - 2004 Hello Chelsea, Bellwether, New York, NY
  - 2003 The Armory Show, Bellwether, New York, NY
  - 2003 Vices and Habits, Here Art, New York, NY
  - 2003 United Bamboo Showroom, Spaceforce, Tokyo, Japan
  - 2003 From New York to Charleston, The Gallery, Charleston, SC
  - 2002 Tits & Art II, GV-AS, Brooklyn, NY
  - 2002 End of the Rainbow, Bellwether, Brooklyn, NY
  - 2001 Paper, Earl Mc Grath Gallery, New York, NY
  - 2000 Forever is..., Bronwyn Keenan Gallery, New York, NY
  - 2000 Stocking Stuffers, Earl Mc Grath Gallery, New York, NY
  - 1999 Room With a View, Sixth@Prince, New York, NY
  - 1998 Event Horizon, Showroom, Santa Fe, NM
  - 1998 Pow Wow, Life, New York, NY
  - 1997 Smells Like Vinyl, Roger Marians Gallery, New York, NY

== Bibliography ==
- Books/Zines:
  - 2020 Ion Birch Holy Man, Innen Books
  - 2007 Hull, Steven, Nothingmoments Short Story Collection, Nothingmoments Publishing. ISBN 978-1-934500-23-1
  - 2005 Hull, Steven, Ab Ovo, Nothingmoments Publishing. ISBN 0-9670913-4-9
  - 2005 Koestenbaum, Wayne, Taylor, Sue, Contemporary Movements & Surveys: Contemporary Erotic Drawing, The Aldrich Contemporary Art Museum. ISBN 1888332247
- Periodicals:
  - 2018 Ion Birch Selected Works, Phile Magazine No. 3
  - 2011 Sexe 2011, Les Inrockubtibles
  - 2011 Krassner, Paul, Sex, Flaunt Magazine
  - 2011 Blanquet, Stephane, Viande de Chevet
  - 2010 Blanquet, Stephane, Le Muscle Carabine
  - 2009 Shuster, Robert, Spring Guide: Chakaia Booker is a Radial Radical, The Village Voice
  - 2008 Blanquet, Stephane, Le Tendon Revolver
  - 2007 Lawrence, Nick, Wallin, Yasha, Freight + Volume Issue 2
  - 2007 Von Fraenkel, Tamara Anna, Disgusts and Rewards, Slash Magazine
  - 2005 Glueck, Grace Airborne Sex and Wicked Wallpaper: Sensual Samplings, The New York Times
  - 2005 Austen, Jake, Roctober Magazine #40
  - 2004 Wu, Claudia, Me Magazine #2
  - 2004 Yablonsky, Linda, How Far Can You Go?, Art News
  - 2003 Kalm, James, Power to the Penis, Erection Day, New York Arts Magazine
  - 2001 Hunt, David, Artnewyork.com
  - 2001 Canning, Claire, Tank Magazine
