= Robert Levine (artist) =

American artist/sculptor

Robert Levine is an American artist/sculptor, born in Pittsburgh, Pennsylvania, and currently living in Venice, CA.

== Education ==
Levine received his Bachelor of Fine Arts from Carnegie-Mellon University and his Master of Fine Arts at CalArts in 1988.

== Career ==
Levine's work is sculpture infused with humor. A 1994 LA Times review of his art notes, "His "Half Knot Painting" is the sleeper of the show, a witty, punning mosaic of wood scraps, half with knots and half without. Understated and crudely coated with resin, it rips through the posturing of the work surrounding it to make a fresh and clever statement about painting's proudly confused identity."

Levine's work appeared in 2015 – "After Malevich", MAMA gallery, Los Angeles, CA; 2011– Paintings, Maloney Fine Art, Los Angeles, CA; 2004– Robert Levine, Superior (an exhibition space), Cleveland, OH; 2001– New Work, Finesilver Gallery, San Antonio, TX; 2000– Broken Standard Pencil Structure, Roberts & Tilton, Los Angeles, CA; 1999– New Works on Paper, Sandroni Rey Gallery, Venice, CA; 1999– Recent Sculpture, Brian Gross Fine Art, San Francisco, CA; 1998– Things Painted, Kantor Gallery, Los Angeles, CA; 1992– New Work, Thomas Solomon's Garage, Los Angeles, CA; 1990– New Work, Thomas Solomon's Garage, Los Angeles, CA; and 1988– Post Facto Intentionalities, D-300, Calarts, Valencia, CA.

Most recently, Levine exhibited at LSH CoLab with his work titled “Regular Painting”. Levine describes the collection by stating "[m]any of the objects I choose to paint are of the most ordinary things we live with – everyday objects; coke cups, a plain propane tank, a bike wheel, a painting rack for example. The lack of expressionistic brushwork force me to make something interesting using the sparest tools – composition, material/surface, paint handling, color/tone, historical references. It’s related to Minimalism but obviously isn’t that. There really is no such thing as a regular painting. I like the lack of qualitative inference.”
