= Ry Rocklen =

American sculptor

- Born: 1978 (age 47–48)
- Occupation: Artist

Ry Rocklen (born 1978) is a contemporary artist based in Los Angeles, working primarily in sculpture. Rocklen's solo exhibitions often make use of found objects which he adorns or otherwise modifies. From 1996 to 1998, he attended the California Institute of the Arts. Rocklen earned his BFA in 2001 at UCLA, and his MFA in sculpture in 2006 at the University of Southern California. Rocklen's work has been shown nationally and internationally, and has been included in several major survey exhibitions, including "Made in LA" at the Hammer Museum and the 2008 Whitney Biennial. He is represented by Honor Fraser gallery in Los Angeles and Praz-Delavallade in Paris/Los Angeles.

== Solo exhibitions ==
- 2020 Food Group: On the Table, 12.26, Dallas, TX
- 2019 Food Group: Genesis, Honor Fraser, Los Angeles, CA
- 2018 Ry Rocklen in Residence: Pixievision, Carolyn Glasoe Bailey Foundation, Ojai, CA
- 2017 Food Group, Team Gallery, New York, NY
- 2016 L.A. Relics, Honor Fraser, Los Angeles, CA
- 2016 My Metropolitan, Feuer/Mesler, New York City, NY
- 2015 Ry Rocklen: Trophy Modern, VAROLA, Pacific Design Center, West Hollywood, CA
- 2015 Condominium Pancake, Albert Baronian, Brussels, Belgium
- 2014 Ry Rocklen: Local Color, Lamar Dodd School of Art, University of Georgia, Athens, GA
- 2014 A Living, Praz-Delavallade, Paris, France
- 2014 UNTITLED, New York, NY
- 2013 Thomas Solomon Gallery, Los Angeles, CA
- 2012 Baker's Dozen, The Torrance Art Museum, Torrance, CA
- 2012 Changing States of Matter, Brand New Gallery, Milan, Italy
- 2011 UNTITLED, New York City, NY
- 2010 ZZZ's, Visual Arts Center, The University of Texas at Austin, Austin, TX
- 2009 House of Return, Parker Jones, Los Angeles, CA
- 2009 Good Heavens, Marc Jancou Contemporary, New York City, NY
- 2008 Good Grief, Bernier/Eliades, Athens, Greece
- 2008 Time After Time, Baronian Francey, Brussels, Belgium
- 2007 Half Craft, Medium, St. Barthelemy, French West Indies
- 2007 Just Us, Black Dragon Society, Los Angeles, CA
- 2006 Land of Super Neutral, B.U.G. Gallery, Bangkok University, Bangkok, Thailand
- 2006 Soft Ice, Zach Feuer Gallery, New York City, NY
- 2004 Lost & Found, Dangerous Curve, Los Angeles, CA
- 2003 Grounded 4 Life, Black Dragon Society, Los Angeles, CA
