= Daphne Fitzpatrick =

Artist based in Williamsburg, Brooklyn

DW Fitzpatrick (born 1964) is an American artist based in Williamsburg, Brooklyn.

Fitzpatrick was born on Long Island. Their work encompasses sculpture, video, photography and a variety of found objects and images. They reference the idea of a modern flaneur in their work, and makes visual puns on sexuality.

Fitzpatrick was a member of the faculty at Yale. They were also one of the founders of Bellwether Gallery, by which they were later represented. They are currently represented by American Contemporary Gallery in New York City.
