= Thomas Solomon (art dealer) =

American art dealer and curator

Thomas Solomon is an American art dealer and curator who owns the Thomas Solomon Gallery in Los Angeles. Considered a "leading figure" in the Los Angeles art world, he represents 1960s and 1970s conceptual and emerging artists. He also provides art consulting services through Thomas Solomon Fine Art Advising. He is the son of New York City art collectors and patrons Horace and Holly Solomon.

== Life and career ==
Born in New York City in 1960, Solomon's parents, Horace and Holly Solomon, were collectors of contemporary art, who supported the Pop Art and Conceptual Art movements. Solomon's early world was full of art and artists including Andy Warhol, Claes Oldenburg, Roy Lichtenstein, Robert Indiana, Gordon Matta-Clark, Alexis Smith, William Wegman (photographer), and others. The artists Christo and Jeanne-Claude were named his godparents.

Solomon received a B.A. from Sarah Lawrence College, then directed White Columns, the New York alternative art space. In 1985, he curated his first show in Europe, an exhibition of 40 New York artists titled A Brave New World, A New Generation, at the Charlottenborg Exhibition Hall in Copenhagen. After that, he migrated to the West Coast where he next curated shows for the Piezo Electric Gallery in Venice.

In 2002, he curated an exhibition at the newly established Pasadena Museum of California Art, the inaugural show titled Beyond Boundaries: Bay Area Conceptual Art of the Nineteen-Seventies.

== Thomas Solomon's Garage ==
In 1988, Solomon started his own gallery in a two-car West Hollywood garage down an alley, called The Garage. He later moved to a larger industrial space on Fairfax Avenue in 1991, also in West Hollywood. During this time, he established a program that showcased emerging artists from Los Angeles, paired with well-known and internationally respected artists. This program led to the first solo exhibition of Jorge Pardo, which art critic Christopher Knight dubbed "among the more impressive debuts of recent memory." He also organized a solo show of work by Tim Burton (his first ever solo exhibition in a gallery) and brought early attention to Damien Hirst.

== Thomas Solomon Gallery ==
Since 2004, Los Angeles’ Chinatown has been Solomon's base of operations, starting with spaces at Rental Gallery, then at Cottage Home in a converted movie theater. His latest gallery, which opened in 2009, is located on Chinatown's Bernard Street.

Thomas Solomon Gallery focuses on contemporary art by established as well as emerging artists with a roster of artists that includes Robert Barry, Juan Capistran, Bart Exposito, Peter Harkawik, Robert Levine, Josh Mannis, Dennis Oppenheim, Ry Rocklen, Miljohn Ruperto, Analia Saban, Mitchell Syrop, and Rosha Yaghmai. Additional exhibitions featured the work of Gordon Matta-Clark and Nam June Paik.

== Thomas Solomon Fine Art Advising ==
Thomas Solomon Fine Art Advising is a Los Angeles-based art consulting practice run by Thomas Solomon. In an advisory capacity, Solomon has worked with software publisher and philanthropist Peter Norton (publisher of Norton Utilities) on a number of projects. Solomon helped organize The Peter and Eileen Norton Museum Donations Program that bestowed over 1,000 artworks to dozens of museums around the world, notable for being one of the largest gifts of contemporary art by a private donor. Solomon also consulted for Peter Norton on a $26.8 million Christie's auction in 2011 and 2012. As a consultant, he also curated LA25, which featured the work of 25 emerging Los Angeles artists, for the law firm Skadden, Arps, Slate, Meagher & Flom. The project culminated in a catalog and 2008 exhibition at Los Angeles Contemporary Exhibitions (LACE) in Hollywood.
