= Sergio Valente =

American clothing brand

Sergio Valente was an American clothing brand. Originally, the brand produced designer jeans for men, women and children in the 1970s and 1980s. In the 1990s, it was relaunched and focused on juniors' and women's designer jeans and stretch-denim fabrics. It is owned by the privately held Seattle Pacific Industries Inc. (based in Seattle and Kent, Washington), also the Reunion and Saltaire menswear brands and the Unionbay teen-clothing brand. Sergio Valente has fashion showrooms in New York City and Los Angeles. Its jeans are sold in the United States, United Kingdom and Japan.

== History ==
The brand was established by Englishtown Sportswear Ltd. in 1975 when designer jeans were in ascendance in the US. Its supposed original designer, Sergio Valente, is fictitious and never existed. Englishtown Sportswear Ltd. was a company in New York City, formed by William Hsu, Martin Heinfling, Brian Leung, Tony Lau, Eli Kaplan and Leo Zelkin. Kaplan was bought out around the early-to-mid 1980s, and Zelkin and Heinfling left the company by 1992, the latter having become a prominent Broadway producer. The remaining shareholders, Leung and Lau, merged Englishtown into Seattle Pacific Industries, which relaunched Sergio Valente sometime thereafter.
