= Amanda Ross-Ho =

Amanda Ross-Ho (born 1975) is an artist based in Los Angeles who works in painting, drawing, sculpture, installation, photography and uses found objects. She participated in the 2008 Whitney Biennial.

== Early life and education ==
Ross-Ho was born in Chicago. Growing up in Chicago, Ross-Ho's parents – Laurel M. Ross and Ruyell Ho – were both working as artists throughout her childhood. Ross-Ho received her BFA from the School of the Art Institute of Chicago in 1998. After graduation from SAIC, she stayed in Chicago for seven years, working full-time at various jobs—including one as a textile designer—all the while making artwork and exhibiting locally. While in graduate school at the University of Southern California, she began incorporating the studio process as part of her subject. She received her MFA from the University of Southern California in 2006.

Early in her career, Ross-Ho shared a studio with a revolving cast of 10 to 15 other young artists — including Sterling Ruby and Kirsten Stoltmann — in the Hazard Park neighborhood. She later moved her studio into a former retail distribution warehouse just south of downtown that she shares with her artist partner, Erik Frydenborg.

== Work ==
Ross-Ho works in painting, drawing, sculpture, installation, photography and uses found objects. She takes images from a wide variety of cultural locations, placing disparate references alongside each other in work for walls and floors, and as freestanding objects. Her exhibitions locate sites of artistic action and personal significance, proposing relationships between a range of disparate objects and experiences. Though Ross-Ho often couches her practice in relation to painting, her work encompasses not just painting, but also photography, drawing, sculpture and installation. For the 2008 California Biennial, she transported the actual walls of her then-East L.A. studio into the galleries of the Orange County Museum of Art; she re-created the installation at the Museum of Contemporary Art, Chicago in 2010. She later produced a series of individual works on poster-sized pieces of sheetrock — similar in appearance — that she conceived as "fictionalized" versions of the real studio walls.

Ross-Ho's first outdoor public art project, The Character and Shape of Illuminated Things 2013–2014 at the Museum of Contemporary Art in Chicago, explores how photography is similar to the act of seeing.

== Selected exhibitions ==
2003

- The Earth is Rotating with this Room as its Axis, Soap Factory, Minneapolis

2004

- Art Toronto, Pari Nadimi, Toronto, Ontario
- Battle of the Dimensions, Stichting Kunst and Complex, Rotterdam

2005

- Platform China, Hella Chihuahuas, Beijing

2006

- ZOO 2006, London
- It Was the Blurst of Times, Commerce Street Artist Warehouse, Houston
- Dice Thrown (Will Never Annul Chance), Bellwether, New York
- To London From Chicago, with Love, i-Cabin, London
- Ghosts Are Everywhere, NOVA Fair, Chicago
- Western Exhibitions, gran-abertura, Chicago

2007

- Hoet Bekaert, Knokke, Belgium
- Cherry and Martin, Los Angeles

2008

- Whitney Biennial, New York

2013

- Gone Tomorrow, Mitchell-Innes & Nash, New York
