= Nathan Mabry =

American sculptor

Nathan Mabry (born 1978) is an artist based in Los Angeles.

Mabry was born in Colorado. His work is a mixture of primitive sculpture and Minimalist-style art. He references the work of artists such as Sol LeWitt, John McCracken and Carl Andre and uses materials including wood, plaster and clay.

Mabry took part in the prominent exhibition Thing: New Sculpture from Los Angeles at the Hammer Museum in 2005.

Mabry received his BFA from Kansas City Art Institute in 2001 and his MFA from UCLA in 2004.

== Selected exhibitions ==
- 2000 - Filter Gallery, Kansas City
- 2004 - Supersonic, Windtunnel/Artcenter, Pasadena
- 2005 - Thing: New Sculpture from Los Angeles, Hammer Museum, Los Angeles
- 2006
  - Red Eye: Los Angeles Artists from the Rubell Family Collection, Rubell Family Collection, Miami
  - Nathan Mabry: Old Fashioned Fourth of July Celebration and Parade, Aspen Museum of Art
  - Cherry and Martin, Los Angeles, CA
- 2007
  - Aspects, Forms and Figures, Bellwether, New York
  - Hammer Contemporary Collection Part II, Hammer Museum, Los Angeles
