= 745 Fifth Avenue =

Skyscraper in Manhattan, New York

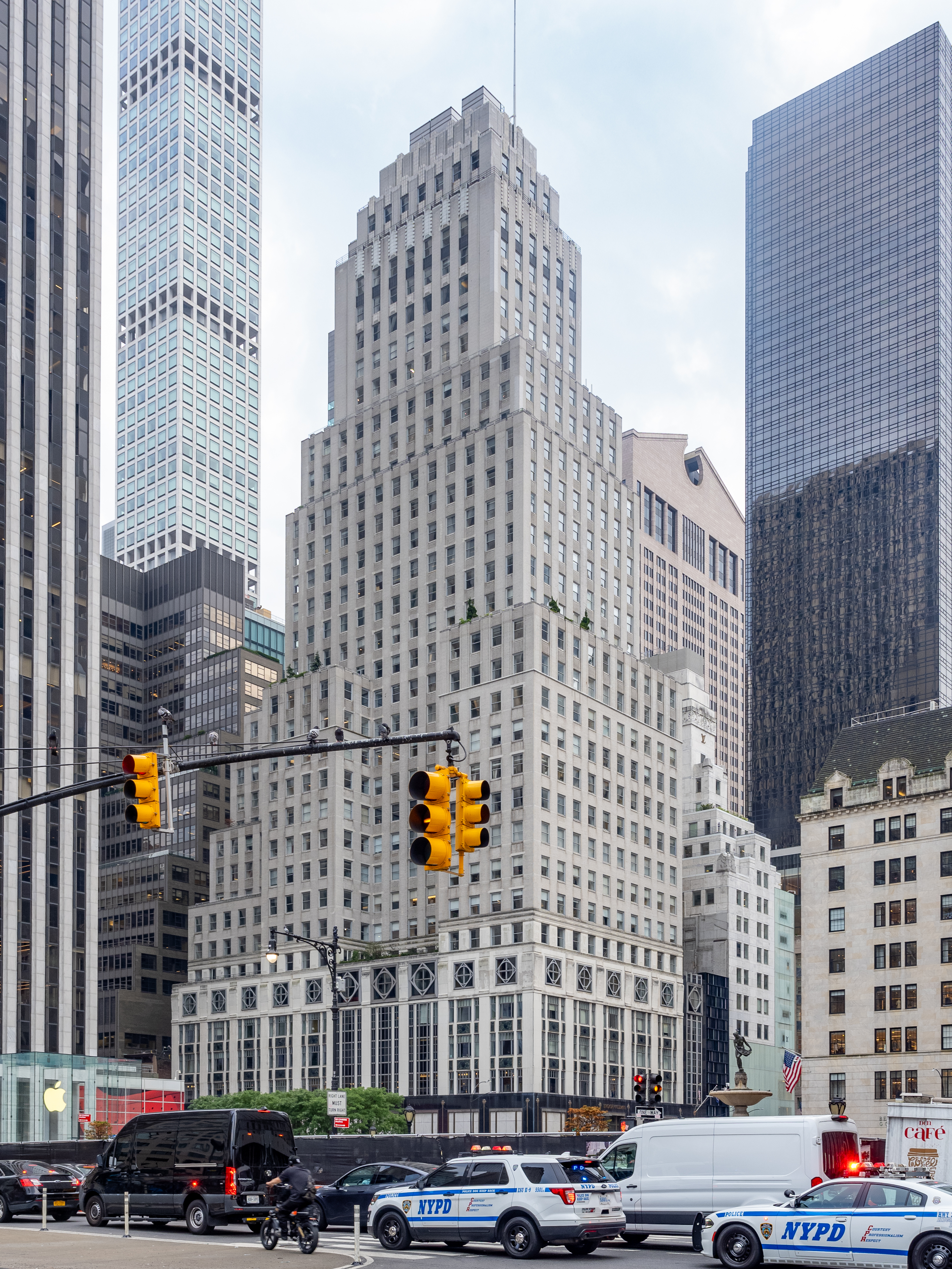
- Exterior of 745 Fifth Avenue (2024)
- Alternative names: Squibb Building

General information
- Architectural style: Art Deco
- Location: 745 Fifth Avenue, New York City, United States
- Coordinates: 40°45′48″N 73°58′24″W
- Current tenants: Bergdorf Goodman (1990–present)
- Named for: Bristol Myers Squibb
- Year built: 1929–1930
- Opened: 1930; 96 years ago
- Owner: Paramount Group

Height
- Height: 435 ft (133 m)

Technical details
- Floor count: 32

Design and construction
- Architects: Albert Buchman; Ely Jacques Kahn
- Architecture firm: Buchman and Kahn

Other information
- Public transit: New York City Subway: N, R, and W trains at Fifth Avenue–59th Street

Website
- 745fifthnyc.com

745 Fifth Avenue (also known as the Squibb Building) is a mixed-use skyscraper in Midtown Manhattan, New York City, United States. Measuring 435 feet (133 m) high with 32 stories, it was designed by Albert Buchman and Ely Jacques Kahn, and opened in 1930. The building has a granite-and-marble facade on its lower stories and a white-brick facade on its upper stories. Inside, there is 50,000 square feet (4,600 m^{2}) of retail space on the lower stories and up to 410,000 square feet (38,000 m^{2}) of rentable office space above. The lobby is a two-story space with a ceiling mural painted by Arthur Covey.

The building was developed by Abe Adelson on the site of several townhouses and apartment buildings. Plans for the building were filed in May 1929, and the building opened on May 1, 1930. It was originally named for the primary tenant, E. R. Squibb & Sons, who occupied 12 floors. Another major tenant, the toy store FAO Schwarz, was housed there from 1931 until 1986. The building was renovated in the late 1980s after FAO Schwarz moved out. The men's store of luxury department store Bergdorf Goodman opened in the building in 1990, across the street from the women's store (located in the Bergdorf Goodman Building).

== Site ==
The Squibb Building is at 745 Fifth Avenue, on the southeast corner of Fifth Avenue and 58th Street in the Midtown Manhattan neighborhood of New York City. The land lot is nearly rectangular, covering 21,942 square feet (2,038.5 m^{2}). It has a frontage of 119 feet (36 m) on Fifth Avenue to the west and 200 feet (61 m) on 58th Street to the north. On the same block are 3 East 57th Street and the LVMH Tower to the east. The Plaza Hotel and Grand Army Plaza are to the northwest; the General Motors Building is across 58th Street to the north; and the Bergdorf Goodman Building, Solow Building and Paris Theater are across Fifth Avenue to the west. Other nearby buildings include the Crown Building to the southwest and the Tiffany & Co. flagship store, Trump Tower, and 590 Madison Avenue to the south.

In the late 19th century, the area around the plaza had several Gilded Age mansions. The Squibb Building occupies part of the former site of Mary Mason Jones's "Marble Row", a group of marble townhouses developed on the eastern side of Fifth Avenue between 57th and 58th streets in the late 1860s and 1870s. By the 1900s, the site of 745 Fifth Avenue was occupied by several of the Marble Row houses and a bank. Although the area to the south had become a commercial area, there were upscale residences to the north. During the 20th century, the area around the plaza became known for its hotels and high-end retail.

== Architecture ==
745 Fifth Avenue is 435 feet (133 m) high. Though the building is frequently cited as 32 stories, the Council on Tall Buildings and Urban Habitat cites it as having 34 stories, and other sources give a different value of 35 stories. Albert Buchman and Ely Jacques Kahn designed the building.

=== Facade ===
The facade was designed in a simple style, with the majority of the decorations on the upper stories. Originally, the lowest six stories were supposed to have a marble facade with scallop ornamentation and fluting. At the time, it was uncommon for commercial buildings in New York City to have marble facades. The main entrance is through an arch made of bronze and marble, and there were originally supposed to be vertically oriented black panels on the lowest stories. The entrance has a cast-nickel canopy and a geometric grille with vertical details, designed in the Art Deco style. The entrance vestibule has rose marble, while the doorways were surrounded by decorative metalwork borders. In the 1980s, the lower-story facade was rebuilt with green marble and black granite panels, accented with metalwork.

There are setbacks above the base. The upper stories have a white brick facade with Art Deco details. The color was intended to complement the other buildings that existed at the neighborhood at the time, which also had white facades. According to the historian Christopher Gray, there was speculation that a white facade was used to save money, as Kahn's other designs had multicolored decorations; the original architectural drawings indicate that the building was supposed to have white decorations from the outset. The windows on different stories are separated by spandrel panels with geometric patterns, including plaques of various designs. There are terracotta decorations, which are painted white to blend in with the rest of the facade. At the building's pinnacle are pilasters grouped in sets of threes, as well as rectangular medallions.

=== Interior ===
The lobby is a two-story space, with burgundy-rose marble in the elevator lobbies. The walls are made of rose marble, similarly to the entrance vestibule, while the floors are made of travertine limestone. One wall contains a mural, likely painted by Arthur Covey, which depicts the purchase of Manhattan and the number "24" (possibly a reference to the sales price). (Note: Minuit is said to have paid for Manhattan with 60 guilders worth of goods, which was equivalent to $24 in 1844.) The lobby ceiling features a mural of Manhattan attributed to Covey, which depicts airplanes flying over it. The mural includes three square panels, depicting the city's industries, and is surrounded by emblems depicting various academic disciplines. Cove lighting is embedded into the ceiling, providing indirect lighting to the lobby. The elevator lobby was originally illuminated by minimalist rectangular glass lamps on the ceiling. The elevators themselves contain bronze doors sculpted by Vally Wieselthier, which are decorated with stepped bands, marine motifs, and fauna.

There is 50,000 square feet (4,600 m^{2}) of retail space on the lower stories. The Bergdorf Goodman men's store was designed by Los Angeles-based J.T. Nakaoka Associates, and is marked by its use of lacquer wood, marble, and Persian carpets. The men's store occupies 30,000 square feet (2,800 m^{2}) on the lower stories. This space was occupied by the toy store FAO Schwarz from 1931 to 1986. The interior has about 390,000 square feet (36,000 m^{2}) or 410,000 square feet (38,000 m^{2}) of rentable office space. The top two stories have a penthouse unit, which included an executive office for the president of E. R. Squibb & Sons, the original primary tenant.

== History ==
=== Development ===
In July 1927, the real-estate developer Frederick Brown agreed to lease several houses at 745–753 Fifth Avenue, as well as two six-story apartment buildings at 2–12 East 58th Street, from Mary Mason Jones's estate for 63 years. This transaction required court approval because the houses were owned by several trusts, who continued to own the land itself. The early plans called for a 44-story tower with stores on the lowest ten stories, and offices and apartments above. The terms of the lease were finalized in January 1928. which required the leaseholder to develop a building at least 18 stories tall. That June, Brown sold the lease to Abe Adelson, the developer of 2 Park Avenue and Film Center Building. Adelson subsequently negotiated to lease the lowest ten stories to a commercial tenant, as he believed the neighborhood would shortly become a major shopping district.

Adelson filed plans for a 32-story building at 745 Fifth Avenue in May 1929; the building, designed by Buchman & Kahn, was to cost $2 million. He received a $4 million loan for the building's construction shortly afterward, and the existing buildings on the site were demolished the same month. E. R. Squibb & Sons became the primary tenant that July, leasing the top 12 floors for 21 years at $7 million. The building was subsequently named the Squibb Building. Adelson later stated that the lease was "added evidence of the desirability of this upper Fifth Avenue district as a prestige location". At the time, work on the building's foundation had not yet started. Later the same month, S. W. Straus & Co. sold $4.5 million in bonds to finance the building's construction. To preserve views from the building, Adelson leased the adjacent site at 743 Fifth Avenue in August 1929.

Three major iterations of floor plans were considered for the building before the final plan was resolved. The building was constructed by Shroder & Koppel and was almost complete by late 1929. The scaffolding around the facade was disassembled in early 1930. 745 Fifth Avenue was one of Kahn's last large office-building designs, as the Great Depression had reduced demand for new office development.

=== 1930s to early 1980s ===
When the building formally opened on May 1, 1930, it was 50% leased. Large portions of the first through third floors were leased to the toy store FAO Schwarz in October 1930; the store opened the following February. Other early tenants included an Italian government tourist bureau, an Eastman Kodak store, the brokerage house L.F. Rothschild, the development firm Paterno Brothers, the Music Corporation of America, the New York Society of Women Artists' art gallery, and Rice Leaders of the World Association (which occupied four upper stories). All the storefronts had been leased by September 1931.

Adelson made two coupon payments to mortgage bondholders before he defaulted on the mortgage. A committee of bondholders bought the ground lease and transferred it to a newly formed company, the Jones Estate Corporation. In 1932, Straus proposed forming a new company to take over the building and pay out preferred stock to bondholders; the company instead decided to issue a second mortgage after criticism from the bondholders' committee. The reorganization plan took effect in 1933. Three of the ground-floor storefronts were combined in 1935 to create a 500-seat Reuben's restaurant. New tenants during the mid-20th century included the stock trader Jesse Livermore, the radio station WGN-TV, the personal care company Revlon, and the organ manufacturer Hammond Instrument Company. Squibb and FAO Schwarz also continued to occupy the building, and numerous advertisers and the New York Yankees maintained offices there as well.

The Squibb Corporation's parent company Mathieson Chemical sold its majority ownership stake in the Jones Estate Corporation in September 1953, leasing back its office space. That November, Roger L. Stevens, Alfred R. Glancy, and Ben Tobin bought the Squibb Building, paying $2.5 million in cash and taking over two mortgages totaling $7.5 million. The ground floor was renovated in 1961 after Marchal Jewelers expanded its storefront in the building. In 1963, the First National Real Estate Trust bought the leasehold for the land under 745 Fifth Avenue. Squibb moved its pharmaceutical division out of the building in the late 1960s after developing a new building in New Jersey. The rest of Squibb's offices were relocated from the building in 1972, and Rolling Stone magazine moved there in the mid-1970s.

The building continued to be known as the Squibb Building until the 1980s, when people began referring to it by its address. By then, the building's tenants included a studio for the fashion designer Diane von Fürstenberg, the fashion firm Yves Saint Laurent, and the fashion firm La Perla. The tenants (which included medical professionals and attorneys) generally occupied small offices. Over the years, the original architectural details had been modified. Ventilation ducts had been installed in the lobby's ceiling mural, and the facade had been painted over, with the entrance screen being removed.

=== Mid-1980s to present ===
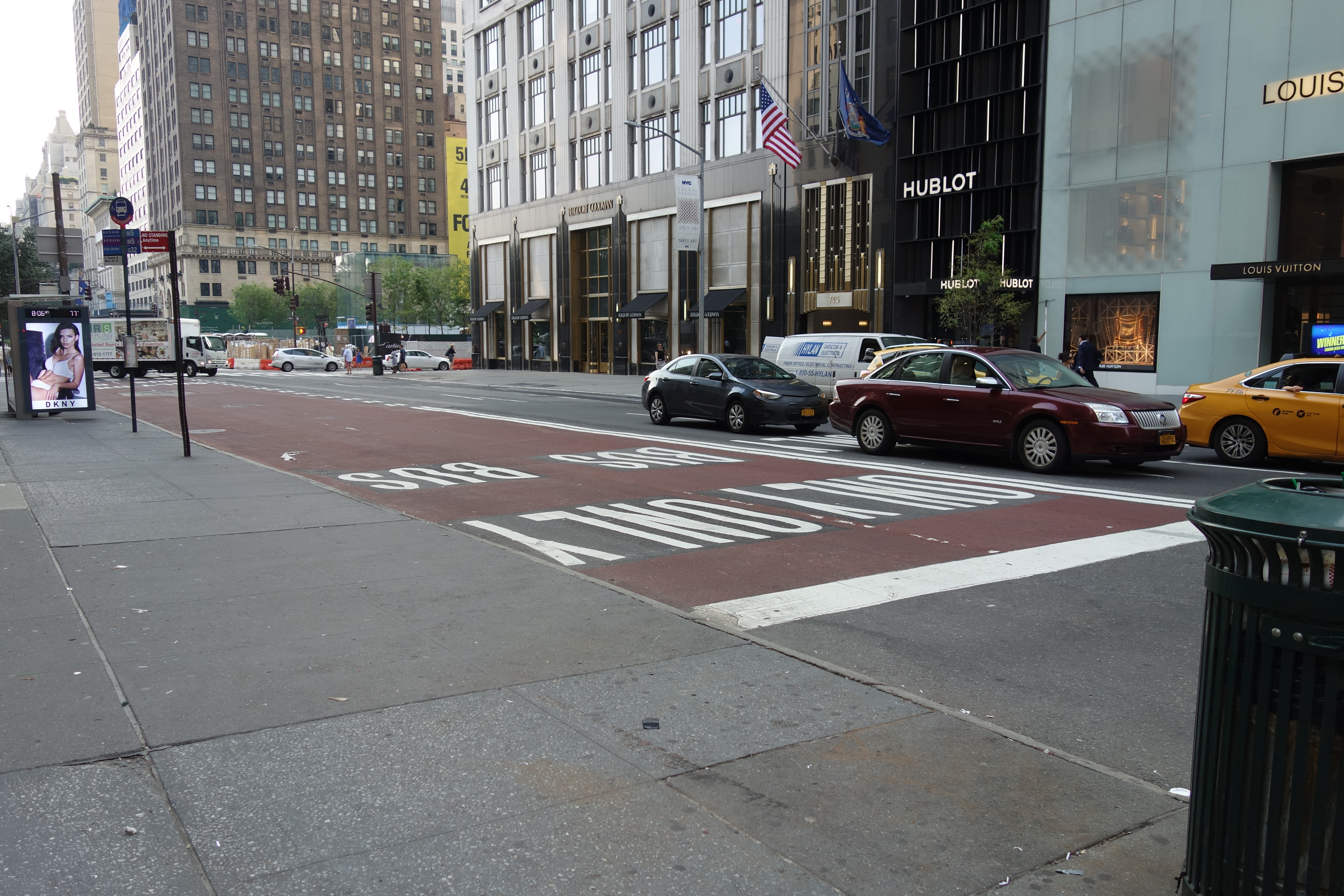
Exterior entrance to the Bergdorf Goodman men's store on 57th Street (2018)

FAO Schwarz announced plans in 1986 to relocate to the neighboring General Motors Building. That year, 745 Fifth Avenue was acquired by the Dutch firm Hexalon, an affiliate of Rodamco; by then, leases for half of the office space were scheduled to expire in three years. Subsequently, Hexalon announced plans to spend $30 million renovating the lower stories' facade and the lobby. The project also included splitting the lower-level retail spaces into 11 storefronts. Thomas Hall Beeby was hired to design the renovation. Bergdorf Goodman announced plans in 1988 to relocate its men's apparel department to 745 Fifth Avenue from the neighboring Bergdorf Goodman Building. This required another $10 million in renovations. The new men's store opened in August 1990, occupying the building's lowest three floors.

The building was placed for sale in 1999. However, Rodamco's tax issues prompted the firm to stop offering it for sale. It was placed for sale again in the early 2000s, at which point the building was expected to sell for $500 per square foot ($5,400/m^{2}). By then, the publisher Primedia was the building's primary tenant, and the structure also included offices for tenants such as Bally, von Fürstenberg, and Hermès. Simon Property Group, which had acquired Rodamco North America during the sales negotiations, sold it in early 2002 to the German conglomerate Paramount Group for over $270 million, (Note: One source gives a figure of $260 million.) or $540 per square foot ($5,800/m^{2}). Paramount also took over the existing mortgage loan on the building.

745 Fifth Avenue's occupants in the early 21st century included Peebles Corporation and MDC Partners. In 2010, Paramount refinanced the building with an $180 million loan from HSBC and DekaBank. Several companies offered to buy the building in 2024, including the fashion conglomerates LVMH and Chanel. Paramount still owned the building as of June 2024. Paramount had planned to convert 745 Fifth Avenue to residences, but the company and its assets were acquired by Rithm Capital in late 2025. Rithm Capital and the building's co-owners, the von Finck family, canceled plans for a residential conversion in 2026, instead announcing plans to refinance the building for $275 million. By then, 745 Fifth Avenue was 37% vacant.

== Reception ==
When the building was completed, it had mixed reviews. The critic Talbot Hamlin spoke favorably of the building as "a beautiful glowing white mass", while the architect Arthur T. North said the all-white facade had "nothing to distract attention from the fine modeling of the masses of the building which alone is sufficient to attract and hold discrimination attention". Harry Allan Jacobs, another architect, felt that the building would have benefited from more color. The critic Lewis Mumford praised the building as a "consistent piece of work" whose design exuded "general restraint and sincerity", despite his reservations about the panels on the facade. Paul Goldberger wrote in 1990 that 745 Fifth Avenue, the Bergdorf Avenue, the Sherry-Netherland hotel, and the former Savoy-Plaza Hotel "produce[d] the quintessential New York ensemble, a set of different buildings that formed an elegant, harmonic grouping".

John Cushman Fistere of Vanity Fair regarded the building as Kahn's best design due to its simplicity. Kahn himself liked the design so much that, as a condition for agreeing to design the building, he required Adelson to consult him for any modifications to the design, to which Adelson agreed. At a 1931 costume party held by the Society of Beaux-Arts Architects, Kahn dressed up as the Squibb Building, which the writer Jewel Stern called "the wittiest salute" to the design.
