= Estherwood =

Estherwood may refer to a place in the United States:

- Estherwood, Louisiana, a village in Acadia Parish
- Estherwood (Dobbs Ferry, New York), a historic mansion on the campus of the Masters School
