= Ely Jacques Kahn =

American architect (1884–1972)

- Born: June 1, 1884; New York City, US
- Died: September 5, 1972 (aged 88); New York City, US
- Education: Columbia University
- Occupation: Architect
- Spouses: Elsie Neut (m. 1913, divorced); Beatrice Sulzberger (m. 1938; died 1962); Liselotte Hirshmann Myller (m. 1964)
- Children: Joan Kahn; Ely Jacques Kahn, Jr. Olivia Kahn
- Relatives: Rena Rosenthal (sister)

Ely Jacques Kahn (June 1, 1884 – September 5, 1972) was an American commercial architect who designed numerous skyscrapers in New York City in the twentieth century. In addition to buildings intended for commercial use, Kahn's designs ranged throughout the possibilities of architectural programs, including facilities for the film industry. Many of the buildings he designed under the 1916 Zoning Resolution feature architectural setbacks to keep the building profitably close to its permitted "envelope"; these have been likened to the stepped form of the Tower of Babel. Kahn is also known for his guidance to author Ayn Rand.

== Life and career ==
Kahn was born in New York, the only son of a prosperous Austrian and French-American Jewish family. His sister Rena Rosenthal brought design wares from Europe to sell in New York, perhaps providing his earliest introduction to design. Ely Jacques Kahn traveled to Europe where he was aware of the work of architect Josef Hoffmann. He graduated from Columbia University in 1903 and later was a professor at Cornell University. Kahn was the father of noted New Yorker magazine writer Ely Jacques Kahn, Jr., and great-grandfather of Ely Jacques Kahn IV, former Director of Cybersecurity Policy at the White House.

Kahn's partnership with Albert Buchman lasted from 1917 until 1930. In this period his work alternated Beaux-Arts with cubism, modernism, and art deco, of which examples are 2 Park Avenue (1927), using architectural terracotta in jazzy facets and primary colors; the Film Center Building in Hell's Kitchen (1928–29); and the Squibb Building (1930), which Kahn considered among his best work. In what has become an iconic photograph, Kahn masqueraded as his own Squibb Building with other architects dressed as buildings for the Beaux Arts Ball of 1931. The building moved decisively away from the decorative modernity of the Art Deco 20s: Lewis Mumford praised it in 1931 as "a great relief after the fireworks, the Coney Island barking, the theatrical geegaws that have been masquerading as le style moderne around Manhattan during the last few years." In 1928, Kahn and Buchman also designed the Bergdorf Goodman Building at 742–754 Fifth Avenue, across the street from the Squibb Building.

As research for The Fountainhead, author Ayn Rand worked in Kahn's office, where Kahn arranged for her to meet Frank Lloyd Wright. Kahn, who had taken full control of the practice of Kahn & Buchman in 1930, as Ely Jacques Kahn Architects, produced some commercial skyscrapers that combined traditional massing with a skin pared of all details, such as the 42-story Continental Building (1931) at Broadway and West 41st Street.

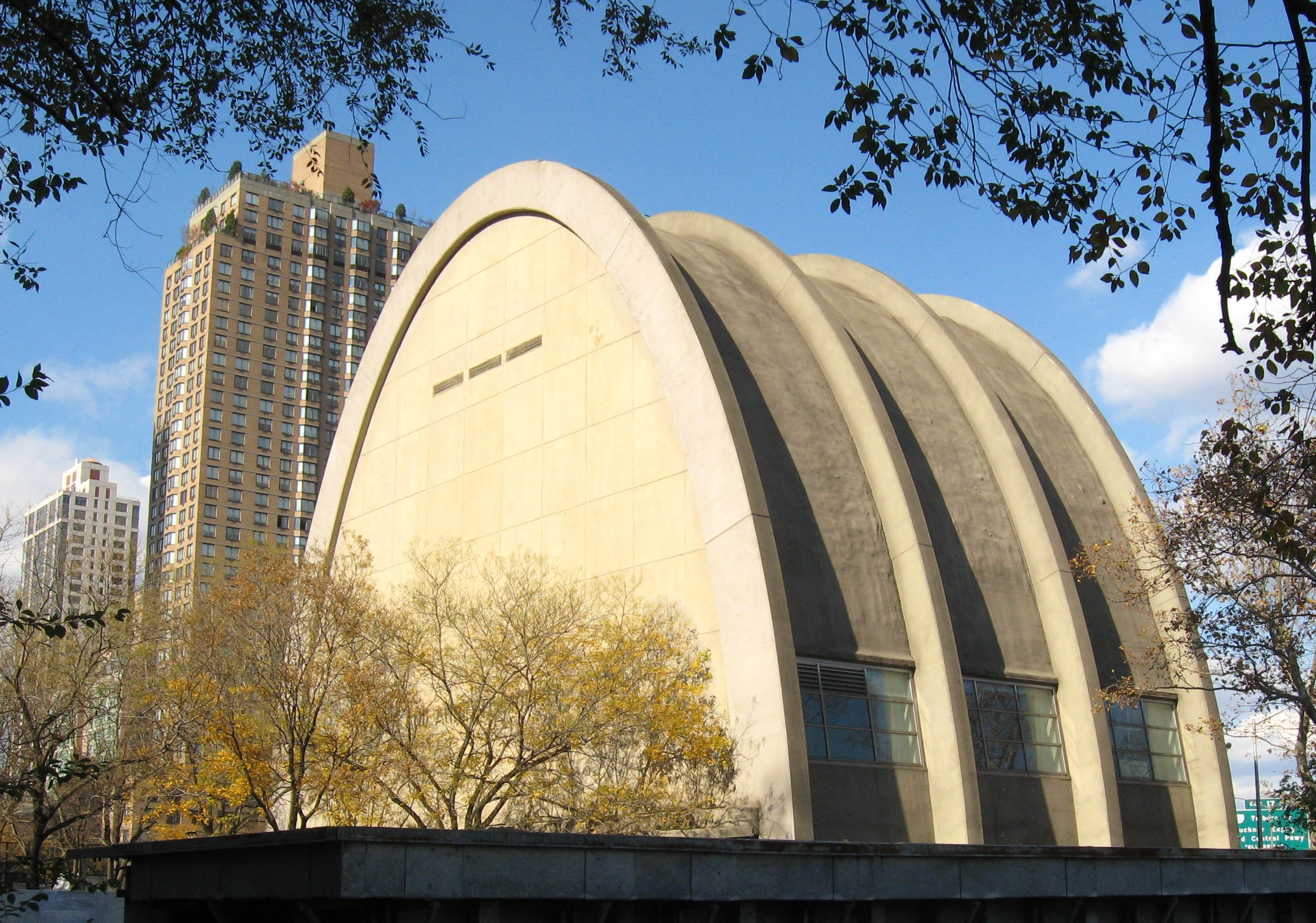
Municipal Asphalt Plant

In 1940, he formed a partnership with Robert Allan Jacobs, the son of architect Harry Allan Jacobs. An exemplary work of this period is the Universal Pictures Building of 1947 which was used by Reyner Banham to illustrate air conditioning. Another is 100 Park Avenue; the firm later assisted on the Seagram Building. In 1944, Kahn and Jacobs rendered a prosaic program, the Municipal Asphalt Plant, at FDR Drive between 90th and 91st Street, as a free-standing concrete structure with four parabolic steel arches. For the New York Stock Exchange Building annex into 20 Broad Street, Kahn & Jacobs created additional facilities in 1956 designed with their characteristic zig-zag of setbacks in the upper stories.

Kahn's work just after World War II had direct relevance to Judaism. In 1946, he began a renovation of Manhattan's Central Synagogue. In 1947, he wrote on the subject of design principles for synagogues in an article entitled, "Creating a Modern Synagogue Style: No More Copying." In 1948, with sculptor Jo Davidson, Kahn made the first public plan for a Holocaust memorial in the United States. The chosen site for this project in Riverside Park later bore other projects for memorials by Percival Goodman, and Erich Mendelsohn.

Although Kahn retired some years earlier, the firm of Kahn & Jacobs lasted until 1973, the year after Kahn's death.

Kahn's extensive architectural drawings and papers, including materials from the firms Buchman & Kahn and Kahn & Jacobs, are held in the Department of Drawings & Archives at the Avery Architectural and Fine Arts Library at Columbia University.
