= Film Center Building =

Office building in Manhattan, New York

- U.S. National Register of Historic Places
- New York State Register of Historic Places
- New York City Landmark
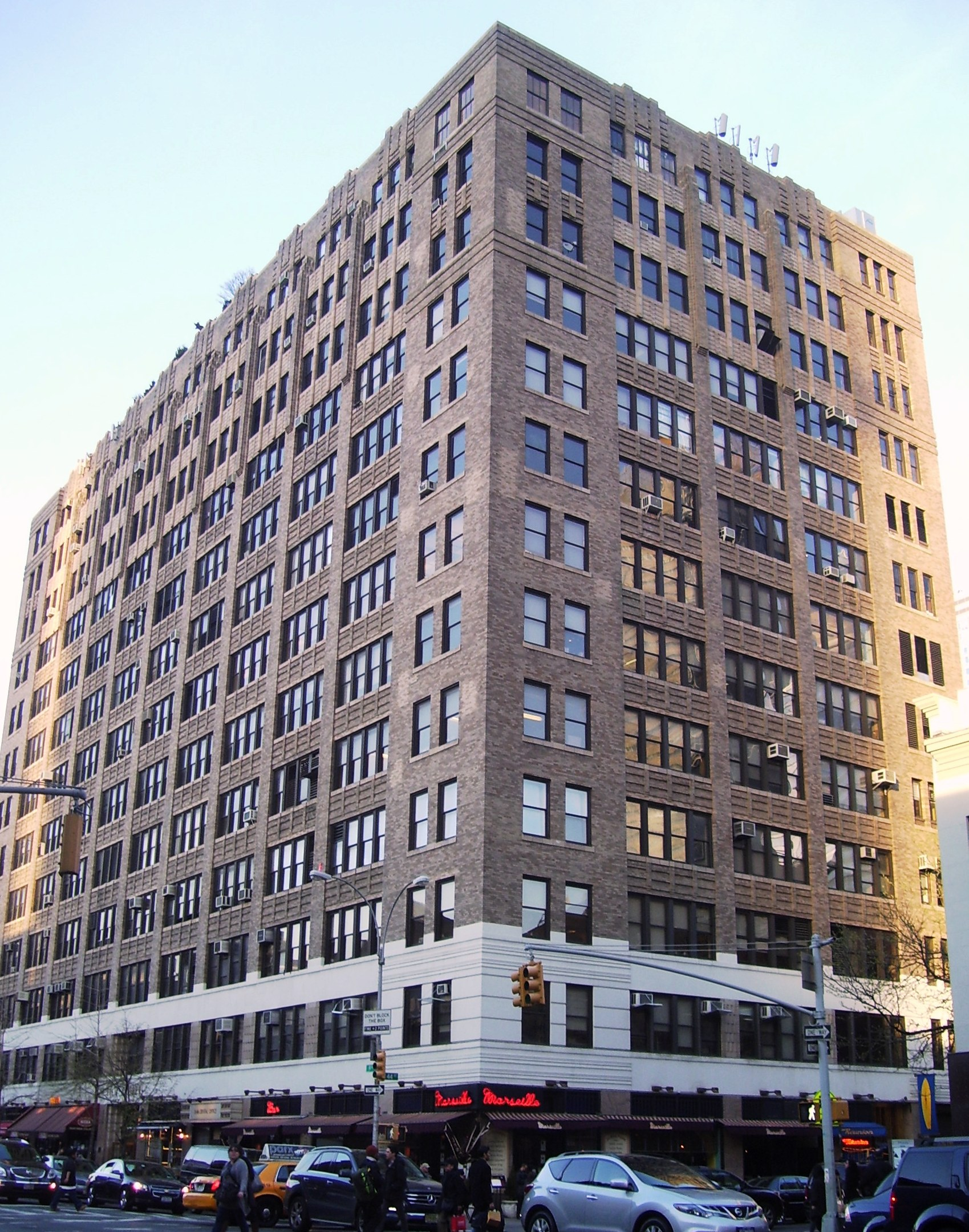
- (2012)
- Location: 630 Ninth Avenue; Manhattan, New York, U.S.
- Coordinates: 40°45′36″N 73°59′28″W
- Area: 18,000 ft^{2} (1,700 m^{2})
- Built: 1928
- Architect: Ely Jacques Kahn
- Architectural style: Art Deco
- NRHP reference No.: 84002768
- NYSRHP No.: 06101.001693
- NYCL No.: 1220

Significant dates
- Added to NRHP: September 7, 1984
- Designated NYSRHP: July 25, 1984
- Designated NYCL: November 9, 1982

The Film Center Building, also known as 630 Ninth Avenue, is a 13-story office building on the east side of Ninth Avenue between 44th and 45th Streets in the Hell's Kitchen neighborhood of Manhattan in New York City, New York, U.S. Built in 1928–1929, the structure has historically catered to businesses involved in film, theater, television and music and audio production. The building was designed in the Art Deco style, with Ely Jacques Kahn as the architect of record. The lobby's interior is a New York City landmark, and the building is on the National Register of Historic Places.

The Film Center Building occupies a rectangular site. Its facade is largely made of brown brick, with windows on all sides, although the ground story has a marble facade and the second story has a white-stone facade. The main entrance on Ninth Avenue leads to a rectangular vestibule, which in turn leads to the main lobby, an elevator lobby, and a passageway leading to a secondary entrance. The lobby's walls and ceilings resemble tapestries, while details such as stair risers, ventilation grilles, directory signs, and elevator doors were designed in a multicolored scheme. The upper stories contain offices, which were initially used largely by major film companies such as Metro-Goldwyn-Mayer. There were also nearly 100 film vaults, some of which have been converted to office space over the years.

In the 1910s and 1920s, New York City's film industry was centered around Times Square, prompting developer Abe N. Adelson to acquire a site for a film-distribution building in April 1928. Tenants began moving to the building in January 1929, coinciding with the construction of other film-exchange buildings in the immediate vicinity. The Film Center Building was sold at a foreclosure auction in 1936 and was subsequently sold again in 1950. By the mid-20th century, television and independent film producers began taking space there. The First Republic Bank bought the Film Center Building in 1968, and Newmark & Company acquired it in 1971. GFP Real Estate, which split from Newmark & Company, further renovated the Film Center Building in the 2010s.

== Site ==
The Film Center Building is at 630 Ninth Avenue, on the eastern side of Ninth Avenue between 44th and 45th Streets, in the Hell's Kitchen neighborhood of Midtown Manhattan in New York City, New York, U.S. The land lot is rectangular and covers about 18,000 ft^{2} (1,700 m^{2}). The site occupies 200 ft (61 m) along Ninth Avenue and 90 ft (27 m) along both 44th and 45th Streets. The Film Center Building shares the city block with the Al Hirschfeld Theatre, a Broadway theater, and the Davenport Theatre, an Off-Broadway theater, to the east.

The site had historically been part of John Leake Norton's estate, which was split into multiple plots in 1825. John F. Betz of Philadelphia, whose family owned the John F. Betz & Sons Brewery, acquired part of Norton's estate in 1862, on the eastern side of Ninth Avenue from 44th to 45th Street. Five-story tenements were developed along the neighboring section of Ninth Avenue during the late 19th century. During the early 20th century, the area evolved into a hub for New York City's film industry. At the time of the Film Center Building's construction, it faced the Ninth Avenue elevated line of the New York City Subway.

== Architecture ==
The Film Center Building was built in 1928–29 and was designed in the Art Deco style. Ely Jacques Kahn of the firm Buchman & Kahn was the architect of record. Edward Raymond McMahon of Buchman & Kahn was largely responsible for the overall design, though little is known about him. The Film Center's first-floor interior, highlighted by Kahn's "highly individualistic version of the Art Deco style", includes pre-Columbian influences. The building contains 280,000 ft^{2} (26,000 m^{2}) of rentable space. with 18,000 ft^{2} (1,700 m^{2}) on each story.

=== Facade ===
The structure was designed as a rectangular mass with minimal ornamentation. What sparse decoration the building had was concentrated on the lowest two stories. The north, west, and south elevations of the facade respectively face 45th Street, Ninth Avenue, and 44th Street. The Film Center Building's facade is divided vertically into eleven bays on Ninth Avenue and five bays each on 44th and 45th Streets.

The facade includes marble piers on the ground story, white stone on the second story, and brown brick on the other stories. The main entrance is on Ninth Avenue, although there are additional entrances on the side streets. On Ninth Avenue is a stepped frame with geometric designs and bands, which flanks the first-story entryway and second-story windows. On the first story of the entryway are three doors; a sign with the words "Film Center" in capital letters is mounted above the entrance. On each story of all three elevations, there is a pair of sash windows in the outer bays and groups of four sash windows in each of the inner bays. The windows on each story are separated by grooved spandrel panels. In addition, a belt course runs horizontally across the facade above the 10th and 12th floors; the belt courses were an example of the simple geometric designs that Kahn used in his designs.

=== Interior ===
==== Lobby ====
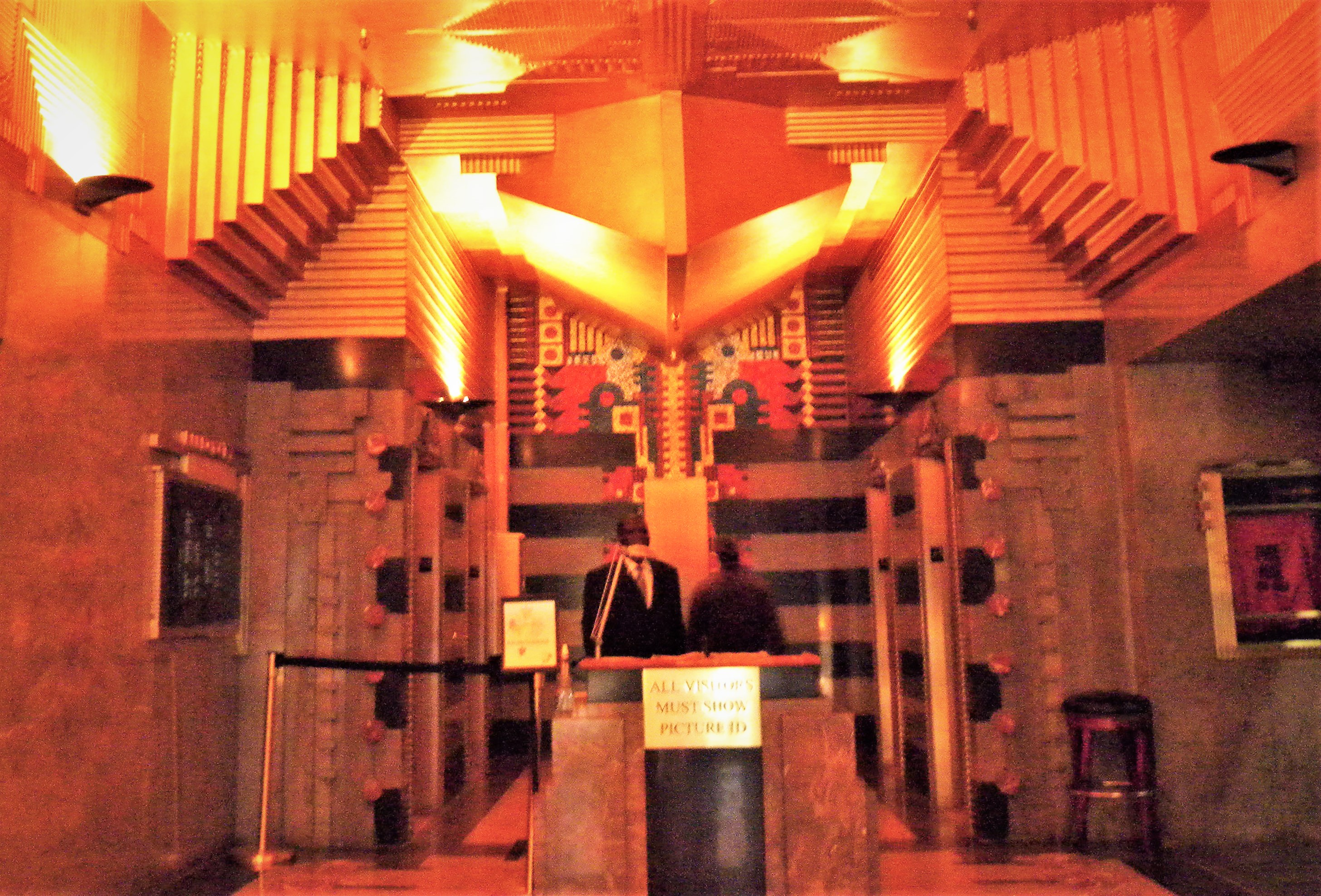
The lobby in 2009

The building's lobby is a New York City designated landmark. According to the New York City Landmarks Preservation Commission, the decorative scheme of the lobby is "one of Kahn's most striking interior designs". Just inside the Ninth Avenue entrance is a rectangular vestibule with a white ceiling. A plaster band, which consists of inverted stepped triangles, wraps across the ceiling and down both of the side walls. There are cast-metal ventilation grilles near the bottom of both walls, with horizontal and vertical geometric motifs. The vestibule's decorations were intended to resemble a tapestry.

Additional doors from the vestibule lead to the lobby, which has a gray wall and a multicolored floor with gray, ochre, and pink. A plaster band wraps around the ceiling and side walls of the lobby, similarly to in the entrance vestibule, and the decorations of the floors direct visitors to the elevators. The lobby may have been designed by Engelbartus van der Woord, who worked for Kahn's firm. The lobby contains various three-dimensional decorations related to theater, such as camera motifs and triangular projections. Where the main lobby intersects with a smaller elevator lobby, the wall has reliefs that resemble movie cameras, which reference the edifice's original purpose as an ancillary building for Times Square's film industry. There are several projecting red cylinders on the corners of the walls between the elevator lobby and main lobby. In addition, the lobby contains orange, yellow, and blue mosaics.

The elevator lobby contains light and dark horizontal stone bands on its walls. The elevator doors, mailbox, and tenant directory are designed in a modern style, with a multicolored scheme, although some of the elevator doors have been repainted. On the eastern wall of the elevator lobby is a multicolored mosaic. This mosaic, perpendicular to the elevator doors, has red, orange, yellow, and blue geometric motifs, oriented both horizontally and vertically. The ceiling of the elevator lobby contains a triangular decoration that blocks part of the mosaic, although it is unknown whether Kahn had intended for this to happen. The elevator lobby was built with four elevators. Floor plans indicate that three freight elevators were installed behind the main elevator lobby.

A wide hallway extends to the south of the main lobby. There is a smaller hall on the eastern side of this hallway, just south of the lobby. Next to this hall is a staircase with a green wall and red cylinders, similar to those in the main lobby; the design of the red cylinders resembles a tapestry. The hallway shifts southeast and then south, connecting to a secondary vestibule on 44th Street. This vestibule is designed in a similar manner to that on Ninth Avenue, with a similar plaster band, but is smaller than the Ninth Avenue vestibule.

==== Upper stories ====
In addition to housing film distribution companies, the building provided storage space for films, particularly nitrate film. As such, film vaults were provided on each of the upper stories, and one full floor was provided for film storage. There were originally 96 vaults, each measuring 6 by 15 ft (1.8 by 4.6 m); each storage vault had 8 in-thick (20 cm) brick walls. The vaults on each floor had separate chimneys, reducing smoke damage in case of a fire. The building had 2 in-thick (5.1 cm) steel doors, which acted as fire curtains and would drop down if a fire was detected. Each vault contained 12 fire sprinklers; by the 2010s, modern fire standards only necessitated one sprinkler in each vault.

Over the years, some of the vaults have been converted to office space. Some of the chimneys have been sealed up after the corresponding vaults were demolished. The building also contained other facilities for film tenants, such as sound and processing laboratories; graphic art studios; and projection rooms.

== History ==
In the 1910s and 1920s, New York City's film industry was centered around Times Square, and major companies such as Loews Cineplex Entertainment and Paramount Pictures had their offices there. Many businesses related to the film industry occupied space in the Hell's Kitchen neighborhood, west of Times Square, where rents were generally cheaper. The film industry of New York City had largely migrated to Hollywood by the 1920s. Nonetheless, many of New York City's film exchanges occupied crowded offices at that time; according to The New York Times, this "created a situation that was causing concern to those responsible for the protection of the city from fire". The Film Center Building was developed on a city block that also housed the distribution offices of 20th Century Fox Animation, Paramount Pictures, and Warner Bros.

=== Development and early years ===
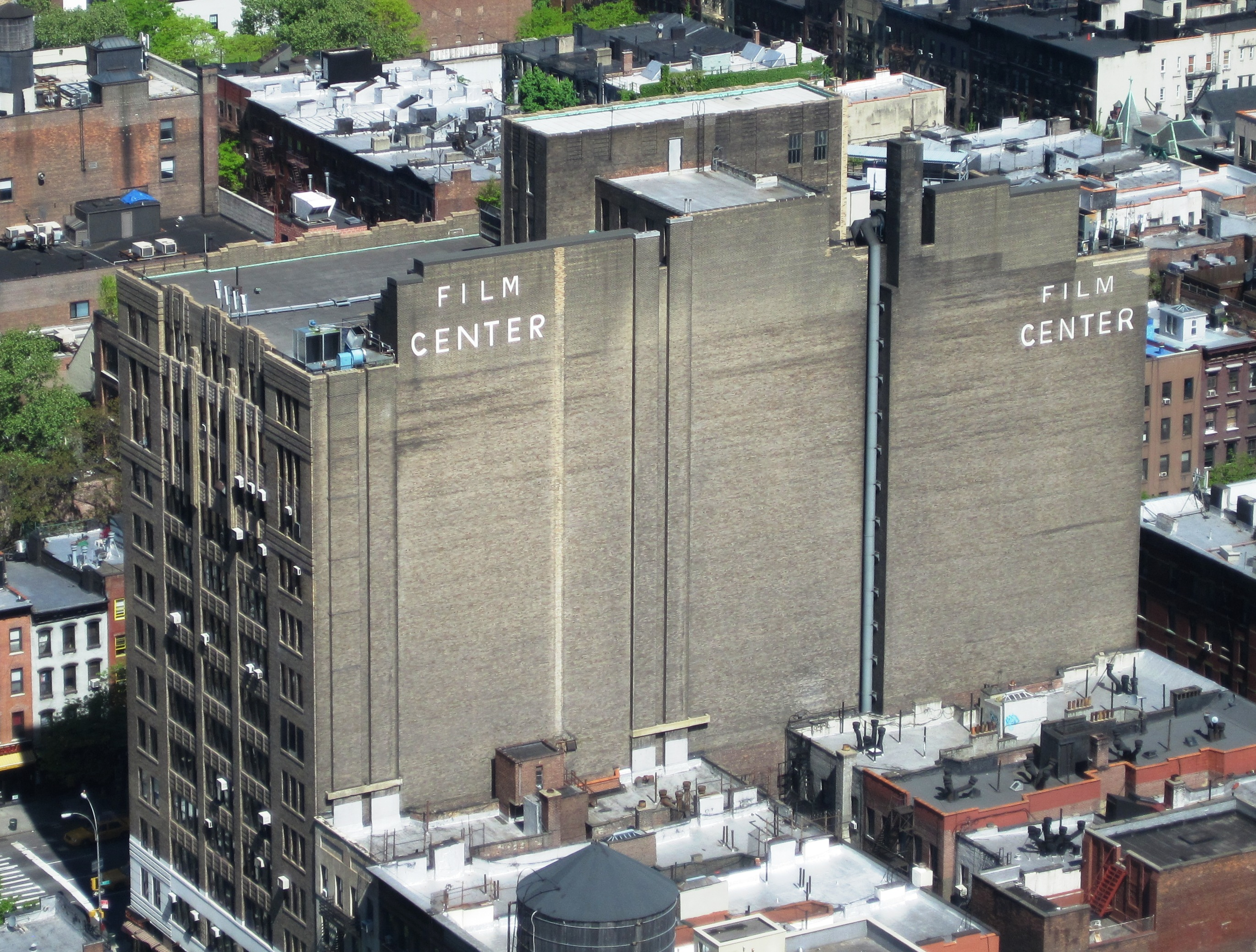
The Film Center Building as viewed from the east

During the 1920s, Charles M. Steele negotiated with various film distributors to develop a headquarters away from the Theater District of Manhattan. In March 1928, Abe N. Adelson, developer of the 2 Park Avenue office building (also designed by Ely Jacques Kahn), acquired a site on the eastern side of Ninth Avenue extending from 44th to 45th Street. The site, valued at $700,000 (equivalent to $13,125,000 in 2025), had been owned by the Betz family for over fifty years. At the time, one floor had already been leased to the Metro-Goldwyn-Mayer corporation. S. W. Strauss financed the building's development by issuing $1.9 million in bonds, equivalent to $35,625,000 in 2025. Demolition of existing buildings began on April 11, 1928, and the R. H. Howes Construction Company began erecting the building on April 21. Half of the building's office space had been leased by December 1928, when space in the building had been leased to eight film exchanges.

The building was completed in January 1929, when MGM moved into the structure. The Film Center Building's completion coincided with the construction of other film-exchange buildings in the immediate vicinity of Ninth Avenue and 44th Street. Almost all of the office space, vaults, laboratories, and other rooms were occupied by large film companies. Thirteen firms took space in April 1929; by that June, about 70 percent of the building's office space had been leased. The building's early tenants included First Division Pictures Inc., Educational Pictures, FBO Pictures, Hollywood Pictures, the Pathé Exchange, United Artists, and the Vitaphone Corporation of America. In addition, the ground story contained a Prudential Bank branch. The building was nearly fully occupied by 1930, when Meyer-Reiger Laboratories leased space on the second floor. Other space was leased to the National Screen Service, which occupied three stories, and to the Film Service Laboratories Inc. Within ten years of the Film Center Building's opening, it housed 70 distribution companies.

Some time after the Film Center Building opened, its owners obtained a second mortgage of $300,000 (equivalent to $5,782,000 in 2025). The building's owners owed taxes to the New York City government by 1935. The Film Center Building's owners proposed reorganizing the building in early 1936, at which point it was 85 percent occupied. As part of the reorganization plan, half of the building's net income would be allocated to paying off the mortgage, while the other half would be used for paying down debts. The Central Hanover Bank & Trust foreclosed on the Film Center Building and acquired it at auction in July 1936, paying just under $2 million.

=== 1940s to 1970s ===
Walter Reade Enterprises acquired the property in early 1948, purchasing a majority of the stock in Film Center Inc. The building was refinanced in 1949 with a $1.5 million loan from Prudential Insurance (equivalent to $20,100,000 in 2025). By the early 1950s, the tenants included RKO, Loew's, United Artists, Universal Pictures, Republic Pictures, and Monogram Pictures. One film producer said: "Sooner or later, anyone shooting a film in New York had to come to this building." A syndicate of investors from Detroit, represented by Benjamin Fenton, bought the building in December 1950 for $3 million (equivalent to $40,145,000 in 2025). The Film Center Building Corporation leased the building back for 14 years. Around the same time, the building began receiving alternating current power from Consolidated Edison; previously, the Film Center Building had used direct current power from its own generators. The building had completely switched to AC power by February 1951.

During the 1960s, the Film Center Building's owners upgraded the elevators and renovated all of the office space, and they operated a 24/7 film-shipping facility for tenants. The building's vacancy rate increased after numerous large film studios scaled back their operations during the 1950s. This prompted leasing agent Newmark & Company, to begin leasing space to television producers, as they required much of the same equipment that film producers did. To attract tenants, Newmark sent promotional brochures to all of the known television and independent film producers at the time.

The Film Center Building was again fully occupied by 1961. The New York City Department of Welfare leased space in the building until the mid-1960s. The building's tenants during that decade also included Columbia Pictures, Universal Pictures, and Seven Arts Productions. By the late 1960s, these tenants began using cellulose acetate film, which was much less flammable than older types of film. As a result, the fireproof vaults became redundant, and Newmark began removing some of the vaults to create additional office space. In October 1968, Video Film Center Associates sold the building to the First Republic Bank for $4 million; as part of the sale, First Republic assumed the building's $1.54 million mortgage. Newmark acquired the building outright in 1971. By the mid-1970s, New York City's film industry had become decentralized, and the surrounding neighborhood had begun to decline.

=== 1980s to present ===
The New York City Landmarks Preservation Commission designated the Film Center Building's lobby as an interior landmark in 1982, and the building was listed on the National Register of Historic Places in 1984. Jeffrey Gural of Newmark Realty said in the early 1990s that the Film Center Building was more than 90 percent rented. With the revival of the area around Times Square in the 1990s, smaller companies began relocating to buildings on the outskirts of the Times Square neighborhood, including the Film Center Building and the McGraw-Hill Building. Among the Film Center's tenants during the 1990s was the offices of off-Broadway theater Playwrights Horizons, as well as recording studios such as Adrian Carr Music, Mirror Image, and Reel Tyme.

By the 21st century, the building's tenants included Big League Productions, as well as the Ambassador Theatre Group and 451 Media Group. In 2017, Newmark Holdings refinanced the building with a $75 million loan. GFP, which had split from Newmark, began renovating the building, including converting 25,000 ft^{2} (2,300 m^{2}) of film vaults to office space, as well as refurbishing the windows and bathrooms. The renovation included adding 220 windows, installing turnstiles in the lobby, and installing film-themed signs on each floor. Bricks from the old vaults were reused within the new office space.

== See also ==
- Art Deco architecture of New York City
- List of New York City Designated Landmarks in Manhattan from 14th to 59th Streets
- National Register of Historic Places listings in Manhattan from 14th to 59th Streets
