= 3 East 57th Street =

Commercial building in Manhattan, New York

L. P. Hollander Company Building
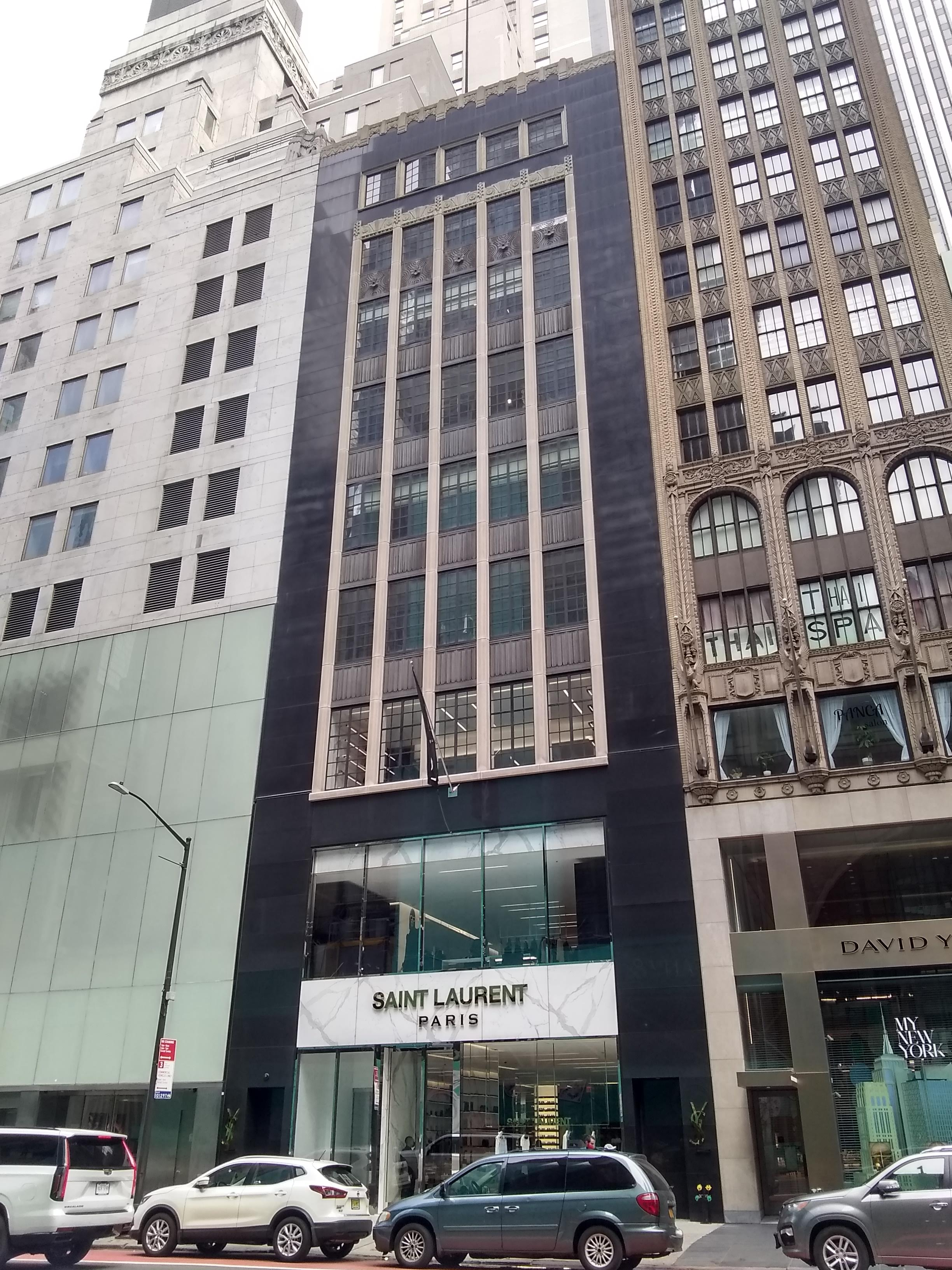
- Seen in April 2021

General information
- Location: 3 East 57th Street; Manhattan, New York, US
- Coordinates: 40°45′46.7″N 73°58′23.8″W
- Construction started: November 1929
- Completed: September 25, 1930

Height
- Height: 100 feet (30 m)

Technical details
- Floor count: 9

Design and construction
- Architect: William F. Lamb of Shreve, Lamb & Harmon

3 East 57th Street, originally the L. P. Hollander Company Building, is a nine-story commercial building in the Midtown Manhattan neighborhood of New York City, New York. It is along the northern side of 57th Street, just east of Fifth Avenue. 3 East 57th Street, constructed from 1929 to 1930, was designed by Shreve, Lamb & Harmon in an early Art Deco style.

3 East 57th Street's facade was originally divided vertically into three sections: a two-story base, a six-story shaft, and an attic. While the base has been heavily modified, the remainder of the facade retains its original design, with silver metal spandrels, gray limestone mullions, and a black granite frame. The interior of the building was designed by Jock D. Peters and Elaine Lemaire as a store for the L. P. Hollander Company, a clothing retailer. When completed, the building received an award of architectural merit from the Fifth Avenue Association.

In late 1929, the L. P. Hollander Company decided to build a store on the site, which then was owned by the Stuyvesant family. The store opened in September 1930 but was occupied by the Hollander Company for less than two years. Afterward, the store was occupied by a succession of other tenants, including a Stouffer's restaurant in the 1940s and 1950s, while the upper stories were used as offices. The interior has been remodeled several times over the years by its subsequent tenants. The New York City Landmarks Preservation Commission designated 3 East 57th Street as an official landmark in 2003, the same year a Yves Saint Laurent store started operating in the building.

== Site ==
3 East 57th Street is in the Midtown Manhattan neighborhood of New York City, New York, just southeast of Central Park and Grand Army Plaza. It is along the northern sidewalk of 57th Street between Madison Avenue to the east and Fifth Avenue to the west. The land lot covers 4,259 square feet (395.7 m^{2}) with a frontage of 42 feet (13 m) on 57th Street and a depth of 100.42 feet (30.61 m). Nearby sites include 745 Fifth Avenue, the Bergdorf Goodman Building, and the Solow Building to the west; the Crown Building to the southwest; the Tiffany & Co. flagship store and Trump Tower to the south; 590 Madison Avenue to the southeast; the LVMH Tower and Fuller Building to the east; and the General Motors Building to the north.

Historically, the site had adjoined "Marble Row", a group of houses on the eastern side of Fifth Avenue from 57th to 58th Streets, built by Mary Mason Jones between 1868 and 1870. During the late 19th and early 20th centuries, East 57th Street largely contained homes and structures built for the arts. In 1904, Augustus van Horne Stuyvesant, a member of the Stuyvesant family and a descendant of New Netherland director-general Peter Stuyvesant, acquired the site and built a private residence there. After about 1921, art galleries started to supplant residences on 57th Street, and other art galleries developed on the street in general. With the neighborhood rapidly becoming commercial, Stuyvesant and his family moved to 2 East 79th Street on the Upper East Side in 1930, though he leased the site in 1929 to the Starrett Investing Corporation.

== Architecture ==
3 East 57th Street was designed by William F. Lamb of Shreve, Lamb & Harmon as a nine-story shop building for the L. P. Hollander Company clothing store. The building is about 100 feet (30 m) tall. Architecture writer Robert A. M. Stern wrote that, with the building's construction, "the pendulum of taste had swung definitively toward a Modernist palette".

=== Facade ===
The 57th Street facade is the only portion of the building's exterior that is visible from the street. As designed, it was divided vertically into three sections: a two-story base, a six-story shaft, and an attic. It used silver-colored aluminum, gray limestone, and black granite. The windows are brought forward to the facade's surface, rather than being set back. The overall design was intended to give the sense of a "weightless plane backed only by insulation", as Stern described the design.

The base, comprising the first and second stories, has been heavily altered from its original design. The base was originally clad with silver. There were two small side doors, one for service and another which acted as a fire exit. At the center was a bronze-framed show window that was intended for displaying fashionable outfits. The show window was topped by a stepped frame evocative of a proscenium, and the mezzanine windows above the ground-story windows had small panes. The doors were designed as "grilles in reverse", with openings to allow light into the ground story. The first and second stories were modified with white-marble cladding following a 1939 renovation. By the early 2000s, the base had black cladding, serving as an entrance to a store for fashion house Saint Laurent. As of 2015, Saint Laurent had changed the base's facade to veined white marble.

The third through eighth stories remain largely as they were originally designed. Most of the casement windows retain the steel frames from the original design. There are five vertical bays of windows, clustered toward the center of the facade. The bays are separated horizontally by the narrow limestone mullions, which rise from the third to the eighth story without interruption. The windows on each story are separated by embossed metal spandrels. The spandrels are decorated with geometric patterns, except those below the eighth story, which have a motif of a flower at the center. Typically, there would be 12 inches (300 mm) of masonry behind the steel curtain wall for insulation, but this was omitted in the design of 3 East 57th Street. Lamb speculated that metal spandrels would replace masonry ones, and his firm went on to design the Empire State Building with 6,000 aluminum spandrels. The outer sections of 3 East 57th Street's facade are framed in black granite. The eighth-story windows are topped by a stone lintel that contain ornamented motifs of fountains and fans.

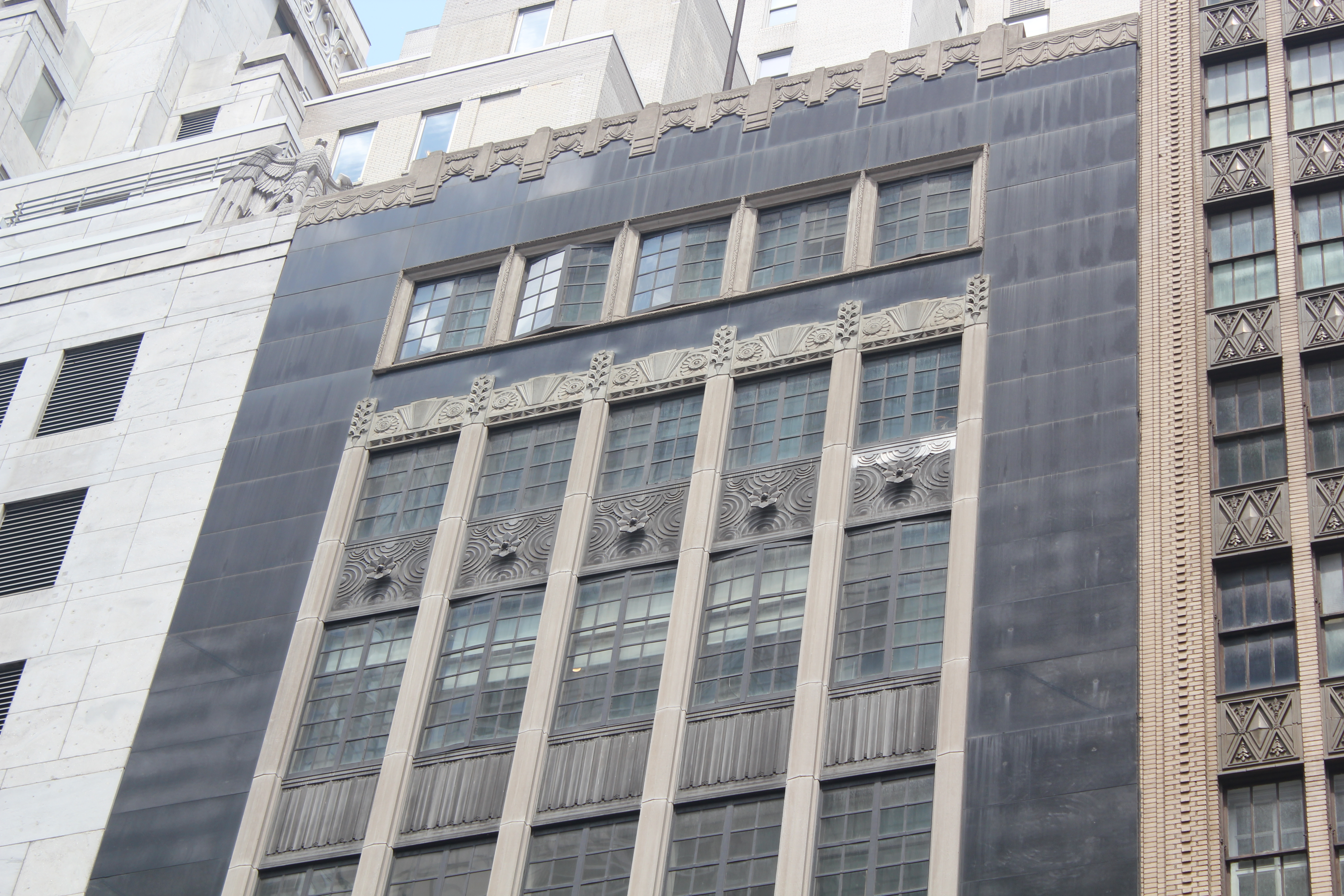
Detail of the upper stories

There are five windows on the ninth story, which are surrounded entirely by black granite, giving the impression that the ninth-story windows comprise a standalone "panel". The ninth-story windows do not contain decoration but are separated horizontally by the limestone mullions. Directly above the ninth story is the building's parapet, which is slightly raised at the center of the facade, directly over the windows. The parapet also has swags, drapery, and stacked panels carved in stone. There is a flagpole on the rooftop above the center of the facade. The stone of the parapet is used to provide a contrast against the black granite.

=== Interior ===
The building has nine full stories, each measuring 4,000 square feet (370 m^{2}), as well as a basement. A mezzanine above the first floor dates to 1940, when a 450-seat Stouffer's restaurant opened there. Originally, when the building was a Hollander store, each floor was designed in a different manner. The interiors were designed by Jock D. Peters and Eleanor Lemaire.

Under Hollander's operation, each story was split into smaller divisions to give an impression of a cozy space. The interiors used distinct materials, including aspen wood and lacquer for the display boxes. The first floor sold accessories such as perfume and jewelry. The second floor had a decorative art and gift shop, as well as a nightwear division. The third floor sold sportswear and was decorated with vermillion and zebra-wood; the coat section had cork walls. The fourth floor, devoted to selling hats and furs, included a millinery shop with satin-wood and lacquer tables, as well as a fur shop with leather on the walls. The fur salon had decorative glass panels by Maurice Heaton, composed of both gray and translucent panels. Ready-to-wear clothing was sold on the fifth floor, while a custom-made clothing department was on the sixth floor. The "debonair" department on the seventh floor had English oak cabinetry with lacquer trim. The eighth floor had custom workrooms and the ninth floor had executive offices.

The various subsequent tenants have redesigned the building in different styles. When fashion boutique Joseph's took over the building in 1933, the ground floor was converted to tiny "shops" selling various accessories. The other floors were largely similar to those of Hollander's: lingerie on the second floor, coats and sportswear on the third, footwear on the fourth, ready-to-wears on the fifth, and custom-made clothes on the sixth. The Plummer home-furnishing store, opened in 1961, had a wrought-iron staircase from the first floor, as well as decorative railings on the mezzanine. Silver, china, and crystal was sold on the first floor; yachts on the mezzanine; and lamps on the second floor. When the storefront was converted to a Saint Laurent store during the early 2000s, there was a handbag department in the lobby, a white-decorated shoe salon in the rear of the first floor, and black display niches on the second floor. As of 2015, Saint Laurent has a womenswear department on the first floor and menswear on the second floor.

== History ==
The L. P. Hollander Company was founded in 1848 by Maria Theresa Hollander (née Baldwin). The company originally sold men's and women's clothes in Boston but subsequently opened branches throughout New England, as well as one in New York City. The branch store in New York City opened on Fifth Avenue in 1890, ultimately relocating to 550–552 Fifth Avenue by 1911. The Hollander family sold the company in April 1929. Its new president Clarence G. Sheffield was planning to move to 57th Street, where the company would erect a new nine-story store.

=== Development ===
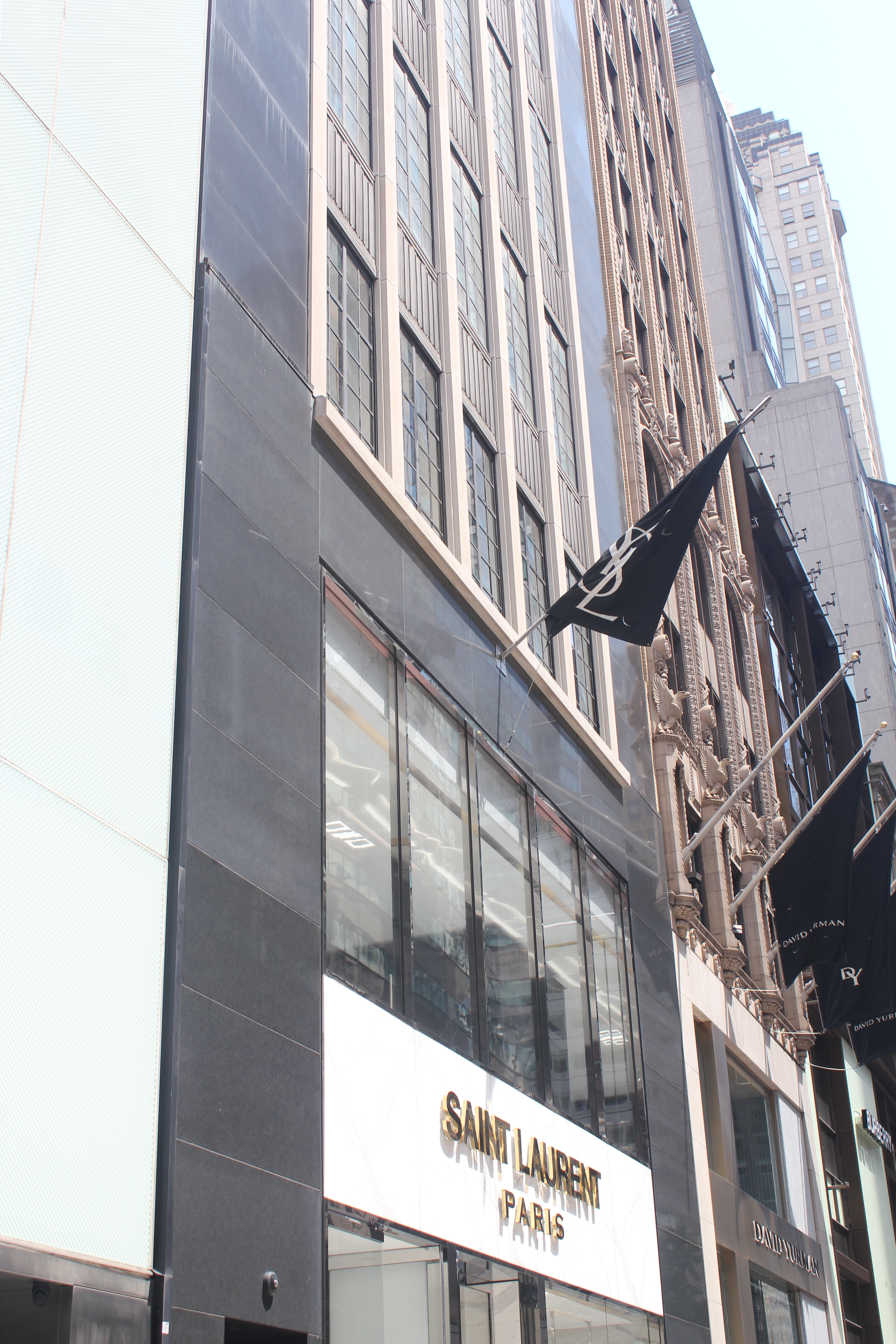
Side view of the storefront

In August 1929, the Starrett Investing Corporation signed a 21-year lease for the site at 3 East 57th Street, with the opportunity for two 21-year extensions. The corporation intended to demolish Augustus van Horne Stuyvesant's old house. By that November, the details of the new store had been announced. Shreve, Lamb & Harmon were to be the architects, while Starrett Brothers was to be the general contractor. The store would be designed in a French style, with a facade of granite, aluminum, and steel. This design was selected because 3 East 57th Street would be shorter than an existing 20-story building at 5–7 East 57th Street to the east, as well as the New York Trust Company's new 22-story structure to the west. The site was to be the fourth relocation for the New York City store and the first location that was not on Fifth Avenue.

Augustus Van Horne Stuyvesant Jr. and the estate of Anne W. Stuyvesant agreed to allow the Starrett Investing Corporation to sublease the property to the Hollander Company. The net lease was to be $90,000 a year. The Hollander Company also leased two floors at 5–7 East 57th Street for its manufacturing division. By August 1930, the Hollander Company was selling all the merchandise at its old location in preparation for its relocation to the new store. The 57th Street building opened on September 25, 1930. The departments in the new store were mostly the same as those in the old location, but the children's department of Hollander's New York City store was discontinued, and a gift shop and a "debonair shop" were added. In 1931, the Fifth Avenue Association awarded its gold medal to 3 East 57th Street for the best structure built in the Fifth Avenue district during 1930.

=== 1930s to 1950s ===
The Hollander Company had been prosperous when it commissioned the new store. However, it declared bankruptcy in February 1932, less than two years after moving into the building, for unknown reasons. After a failed attempt to avoid receivership, the company sold all the products in the store the following month, earning $23,000 from the liquidation. A new L. P. Hollander Company was established that June at 8 West 56th Street, one block south. In December 1932, the owner of 3 East 57th Street reassigned the lease from the Starrett Investing Corporation to the Zeeland Corporation. The same month, Zeeland subleased the building to fashion boutique Joseph's, which opened a shop there in March 1933. Under Joseph's occupancy, the building hosted events, including a fundraiser for cancer awareness in 1933 and a fundraiser for the Italian Junior League in early 1934.

In December 1939, the Hollander Building was leased for 21 years to Stouffer's for a new unit in its chain of restaurants. Aymar Embury II redesigned the two lower floors with a new white-marble facade. In addition, Embury installed a mezzanine between the first and second floor. (Note: It is unclear whether the alterations were made. The New York City Landmarks Preservation Commission indicates that the modifications had apparently not been made, but a New York Herald Tribune article mentioned that the building had been recently renovated.) It opened in September 1940; soon afterward, a bomb scare forced the addition of a police presence around the restaurant. The Stuyvesant estate transferred the building to St. Luke's Hospital in 1958, and the hospital sold the building to Webb and Knapp in May 1960. (Note: According to the Landmarks Preservation Commission, the Stuyvesant estate transferred ownership of the building as early as 1954.) The Stouffer's restaurant continued to operate in the building until the expiration of its lease in August 1961.

=== 1960s to present ===
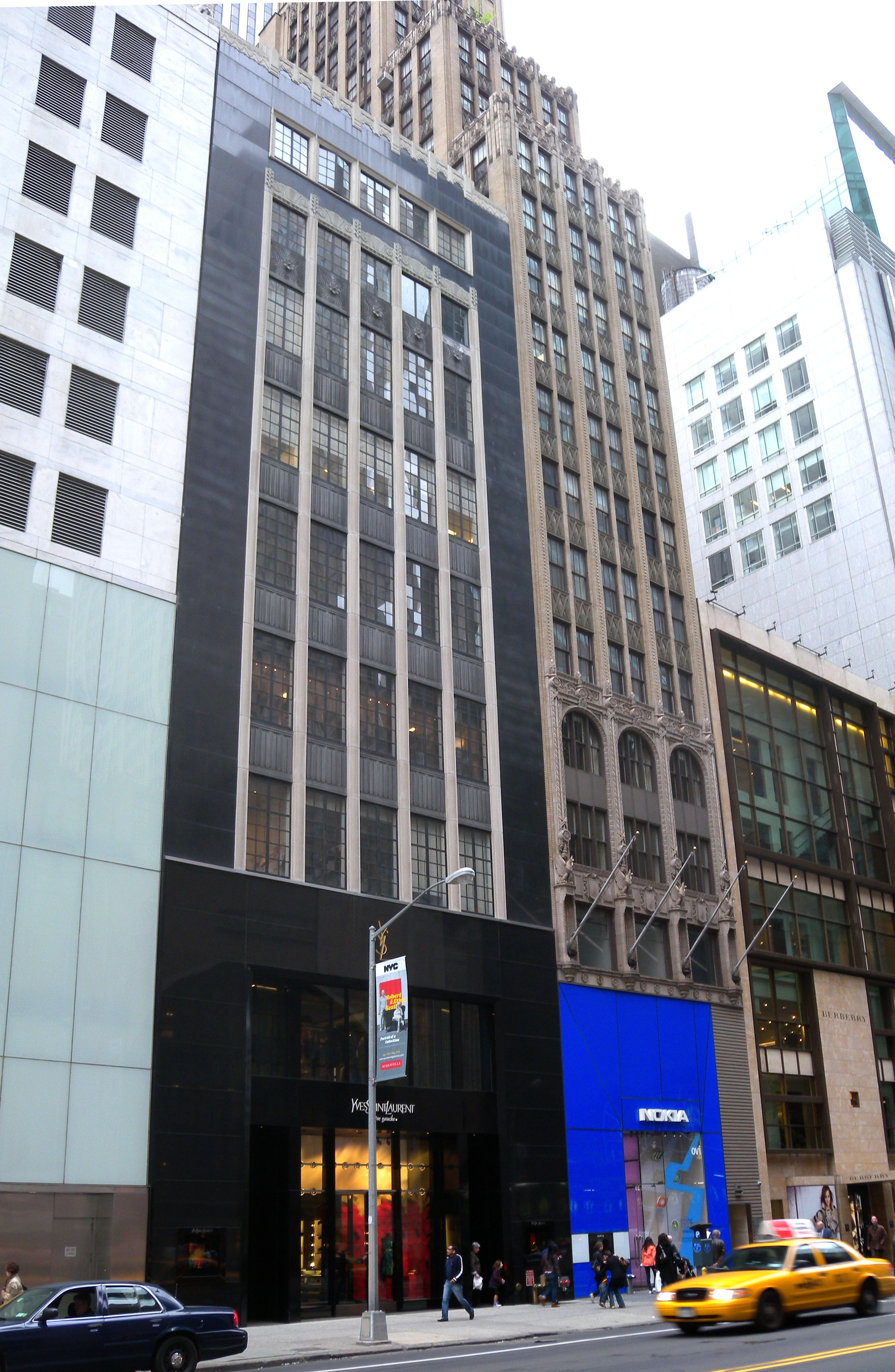
3 (left) and 5 East 57th

Shortly before Stouffer's lease expired, home-furnishing retailer W. H. Plummer & Co. signed a 30-year net lease for the building. In May 1961, Webb and Knapp sold the building to an investment syndicate for $465,000. The Plummer store opened in the first floor, mezzanine, and second floor the following month, moving from an adjacent Fifth Avenue building. Other stories were subleased to office tenants, including Laura Dee Advertising Service on the fourth floor and Motion Picture Stages on the sixth floor. Plummer had occupied 3 East 57th Street for less than a year when it went bankrupt in March 1962. Samuel Wechsler acquired Plummer and leased the building that July, with plans to add a shipping department in the basement and offices on the ninth floor, thereby expanding the store to 14,000 square feet (1,300 m^{2}). The other 24,000 square feet (2,200 m^{2}) of space not used by the store would continue to be subleased. The newly combined Plummer McCutcheon store opened in October 1962.

The Hat Corporation of America, which sold Cavanagh-branded hats and clothing, was planning to open a store in the building by April 1964. The company's new store opened that November after the lowest stories were renovated for $500,000. By the following month, the building was fully occupied; it was renamed for the Hat Corporation of America, which had a store on the basement through second story, as well as wholesale showrooms and offices on the third through fifth floors. Plummer McCutcheon and Sound Makers Inc. each took a full story, the Mark Century Corporation took one and a half floors, and Florian de Narde took the remaining half-floor.

Cavanagh only operated a store in the building until 1971, when the basement through second story were leased to numismatic dealer Harmer Rooke & Co. By the 1980s, the building's tenants included philatelic publisher Scott Publishing and an Ann Taylor store. The Ann Taylor store held a ten-year lease for four stories at the building's base until 1994. Designs Inc., a store selling Levi Strauss & Co. clothing, then leased the 15,000 square feet (1,400 m^{2}) that had been taken up by Ann Taylor.

The New York City Landmarks Preservation Commission designated the building as a landmark on June 17, 2003. Saint Laurent opened in the building the same year, initially taking up two stories. The opening of the Saint Laurent store prompted speculation that its nearby flagship on Madison Avenue would be closed. By 2013, there were plans to redesign the 57th Street store. After a 259-day renovation, Saint Laurent reopened in October 2015. The facade was resurfaced in white granite despite the opposition of the local Manhattan Community Board 5. The renovation expanded Saint Laurent from two to three stories. At the time, it occupied about 14,000 square feet (1,300 m^{2}) and was the only three-story Saint Laurent store in the world.

== See also ==
- List of New York City Designated Landmarks in Manhattan from 14th to 59th Streets
