= Estherwood (Dobbs Ferry, New York) =

Historic house in New York, United States

- Estherwood and Carriage House
- U.S. National Register of Historic Places
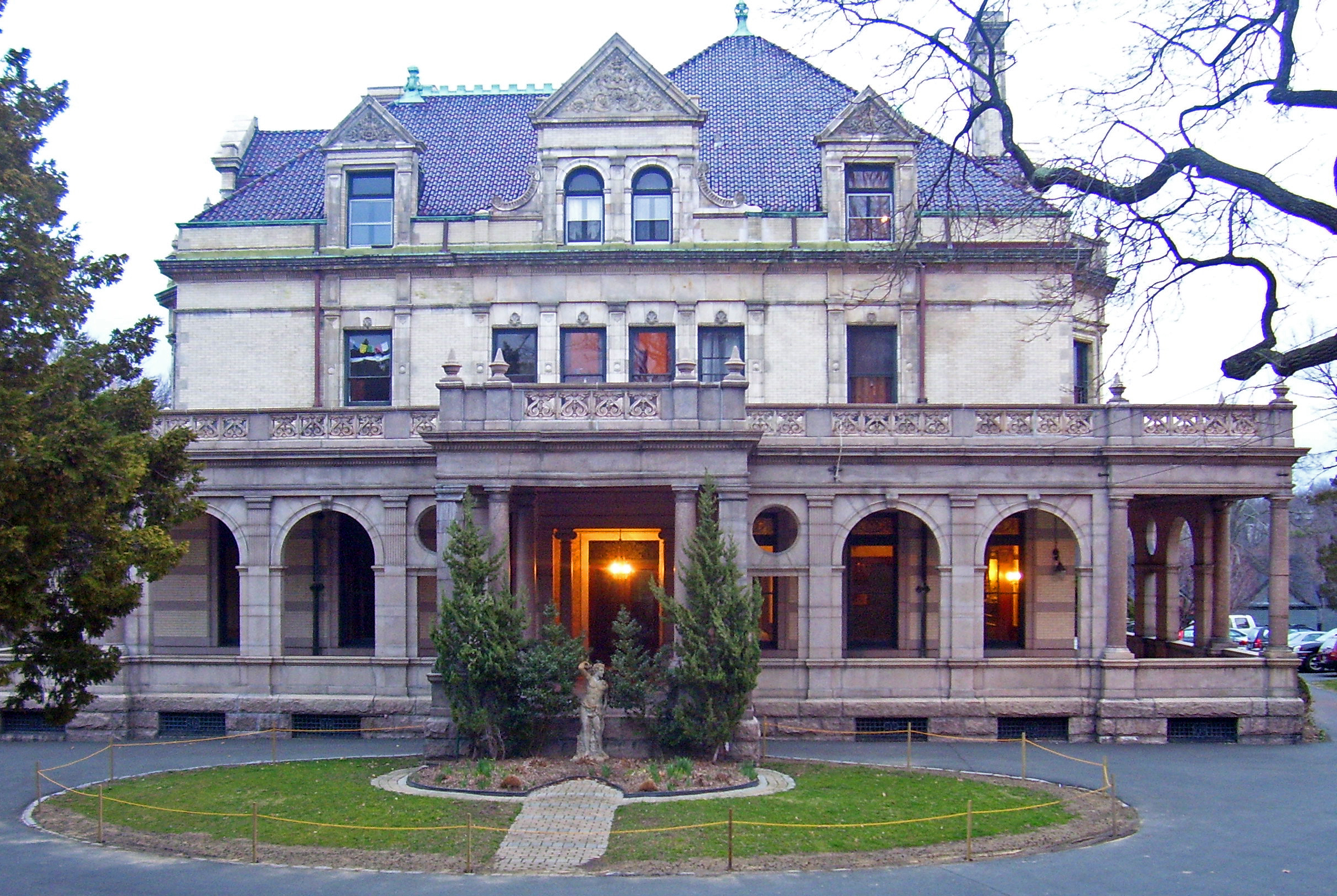
- West (front) elevation, 2008

- Location within New York Location within the United States
- Interactive map showing Estherwood’s location
- Location: Dobbs Ferry, NY
- Nearest city: White Plains
- Coordinates: 41°00′38″N 73°52′13″W
- Area: 10 acres (4 ha)
- Built: 1894–5
- Architect: Buchman & Deisler
- Architectural style: Renaissance Revival (mansion), Queen Anne (carriage house)
- NRHP reference No.: 79001646
- Added to NRHP: November 20, 1979

Estherwood is a late 19th-century mansion located on the campus of The Masters School in Dobbs Ferry, New York, United States. It was the home of industrial tycoon James Jennings McComb, who supported Masters financially in its early years when his daughters attended. The house's octagonal library was the first section built. It had been attached to McComb's previous home, but he had felt it deserved a house more in keeping with its style and so had architect Albert Buchman design Estherwood built around it.

The interior features lavish decoration and detail, with generous use of marble and gold leaf. As the only significant châteauesque building in Westchester County, it was added to the National Register of Historic Places (NRHP) in 1979 as Estherwood and Carriage House.

== Buildings ==
The Estherwood NRHP listing recognizes both the mansion and its carriage house as contributing resources. Both are located on a 10-acre (4 ha) parcel just east of the main Masters buildings.

=== Mansion exterior ===
The house is three and a half stories high, with a varying number of bays on each of its sides. It is faced in white pressed brick with granite trim and terra-cotta detailing. Its roof is black and red ceramic tile, with copper cresting and stone filials, from which four red brick chimneys rise. A copper-clad cupola caps the east facade's tower. The porte-cochère on the west facade, the house's main entrance, is supported by granite piers and Doric order columns. It has a Guastavino tile ceiling to match the one on the veranda that encircles the rest of the house. The irregular fenestration includes fifteen dormer windows and a second-story oriel window.

=== Mansion interior ===
From the entrance, there is a vestibule with mosaic flooring, marble baseboards, classical molding and bronze light fixtures. It leads to 65-foot-long (20 m) Great Hall that rises two stories to a coffered ceiling and skylights. A divided staircase of pink marble rises to a gallery that overlooks the hall. The balcony is supported by Ionic columns on high plinths. The hall also features a green marble fireplace with limestone trim. The oak parquet floor has a carved Greek key-patterned border repeated on the underside of the gallery.

Six rooms are located off the Great Hall, also with lavish decoration. The dining room has dark oak walls with carved Northern European motifs such as boars' and rams' heads, broken by copper and bronze medieval sconces. Built-in service units are supported by caryatids. The north wall is broken by the fireplace, with a mosaic wall and surround. The adjacent plaster wall is painted Pompeii red. The shallow vaulted ceiling is, like that of the Great Hall, coffered.

The Music Room – known as the "Red Room" – features an alcove flanked by red marble columns and pilasters, both with capitals highlighted in gold leaf. Adamesque swags and garlands, also highlighted in gold, are carved into the wall and ceiling along with musical motifs such as lyres, horns and Pan flutes. These motifs recur in the stained glass window transoms. The south wall is of mahogany with brass trim; it features the Music Room's fireplace, flanked by carved Corinthian pilasters.

The Reception Room features intricately patterned plaster walls and ceilings. Two of its windows have gold-stained panels, and an original crystal chandelier still hangs. The drawing room at the house's northwest corner features scrolled brackets and marble Composite columns on high plinths. Its marble fireplace has wood surrounds.

The large octagonal library has a central octagonal stained-glass skylight. Stained glass, with a rich floral motif, is also found in the transoms of the two large windows in the north wall. Other ornament includes the plaster molding with gold leaf. The shelving is made of dark Honduran mahogany. Of the six major rooms on the main floor, the Billiards Room is the least decorated, with oak wainscoting and eared windows and doors. The plaster ceiling likewise has a simple molding and a central medallion.

Upstairs, the house has been remodeled somewhat by the school, but the bird's-eye maple and golden oak woodwork have been retained, as well as the frosted glass closet-door panels and sliding doors off the gallery. The attic also features its original arched doorways, water tanks, and unusual floor-to-ceiling diagonal braces in the center.

This mansion is currently being used as teacher housing for The Masters School. Because of this, some of the rooms have been connected and furnished so that it can accommodate their needs.

Estherwood houses a Steinway and Sons piano that is often used for student recitals and performances.

=== Carriage house ===
The carriage house is located to the east of the main house, downhill from it. It was built to take advantage of the slope, in a massed Queen Anne style with Stick-style porte-cochére. Its interior features wrought-iron columnar supports and sliding doors between every space.

== History ==
Ohio native James Jennings McComb's wealth came from his invention of the ties that secured cotton as it emerged from balers. In the 1860s he came to Dobbs Ferry, where he sent his three daughters to the Misses' Masters School, named for its founding sisters in 1877. He bought the current property and eventually moved his family to the small Park Cottage (still standing) near the school's Clinton Avenue location to shorten his daughters' walk to school.

The octagonal library was first built as an addition to Park Cottage, to complement an octagonal library desk McComb had bought in Europe. He was soon dissatisfied with how poorly the new room integrated with the rest of the house, and hired the New York firm of Buchman & Deisler to design a new house connected to the library that would better match it.

McComb and his family lived in Estherwood from its completion in 1895 to his death in 1901. He had continued to acquire nearby property and rent it to the school, and in 1910 the school bought it all, including Estherwood and the carriage house, from his heirs. It has made few changes to the building, primarily adding an elevator in 1949. Estherwood was used as a dormitory for many years; today its upper floors serve as faculty apartments and the main floor is used for special events and school functions.

== Aesthetics ==
Estherwood is a residential commission for Albert Buchman, better known for commercial and institutional structures such as the New York World Tower and the Student Building at Barnard College. He brought to the commission a breadth of architectural knowledge and an awareness of the tastes of the new rich of the Gilded Age. In its use of materials and elements that would be characterized as conspicuous consumption, Estherwood has been compared to Richard Morris Hunt's The Breakers – the Vanderbilt family summer home in Newport, Rhode Island – that had been completed only three years before, attracting much notice as the most expensive house ever built at that time.

== See also ==
- National Register of Historic Places listings in southern Westchester County, New York
