= Albert Buchman =

American architect

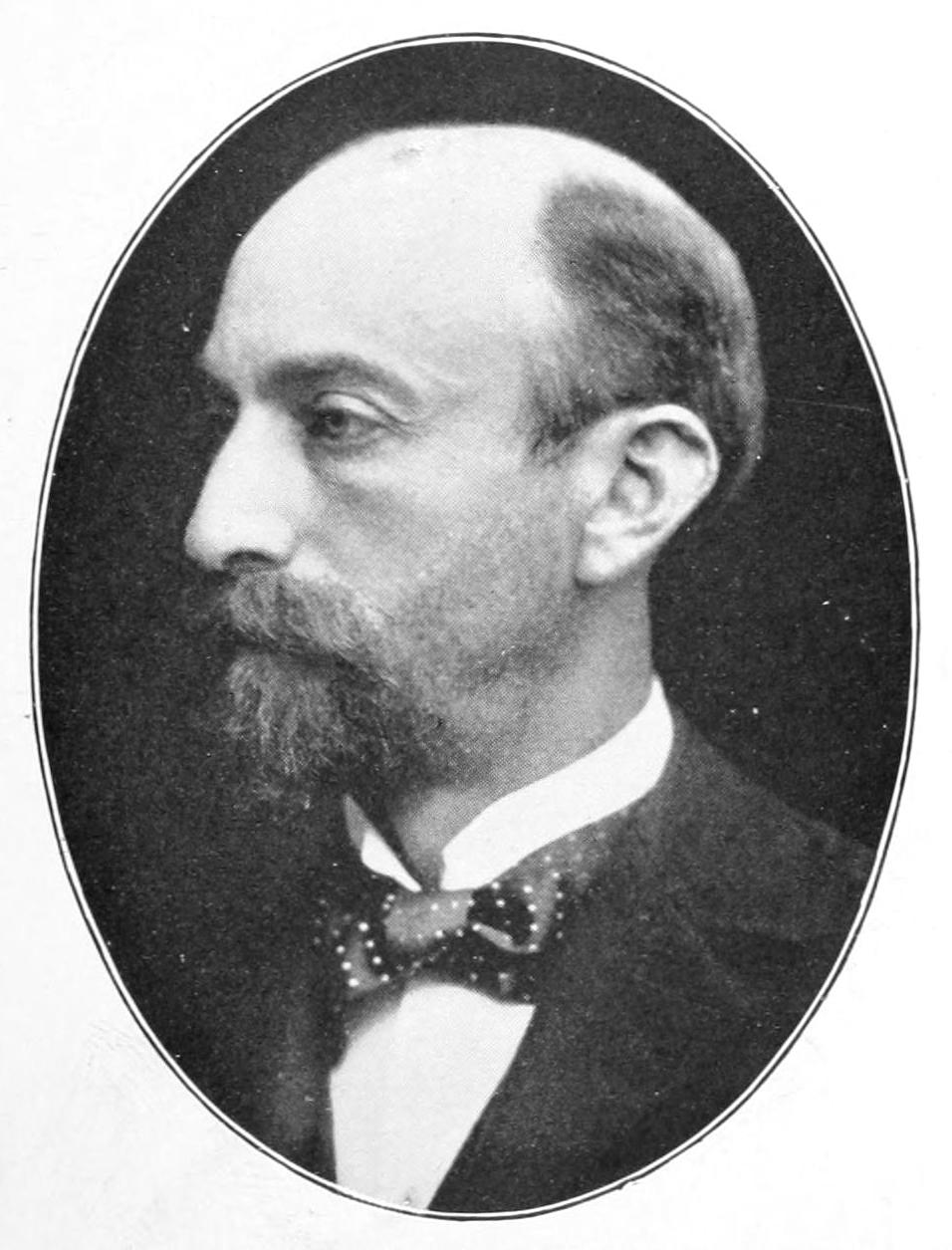
- Born: April 11, 1859; Cincinnati, Ohio, US
- Died: April 15, 1936 (aged 77); New York City, US
- Occupation: Architect
- Practice: Schwarzmann & Buchman; Buchman & Deisler; Buchman & Fox; Buchman & Kahn

Albert Buchman (1859–1936) was an American architect in practice in New York.

== Life and career ==
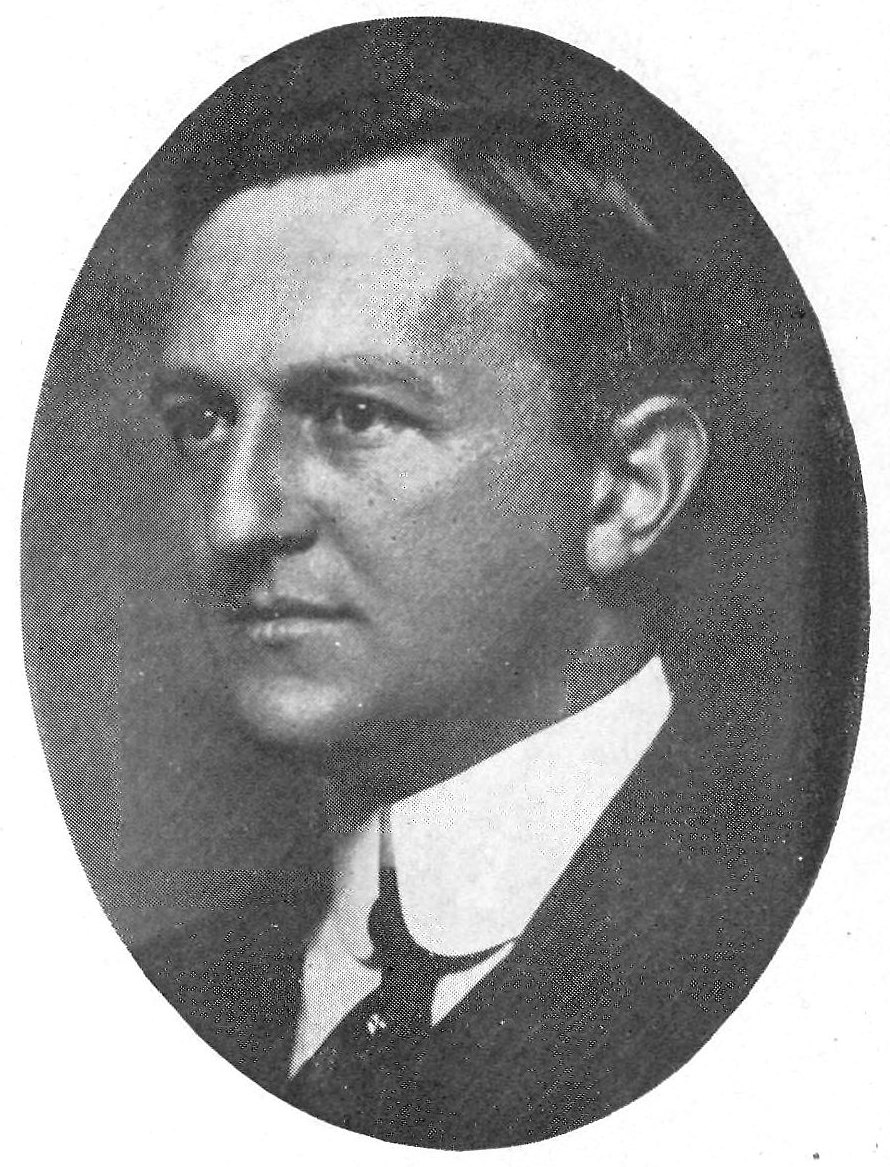
Mortimer J. Fox, 1860–1945.

Buchman was born April 11, 1859, in Cincinnati, Ohio. He attended Cornell University, graduating in 1880. He then took a job with the architect Herman J. Schwarzmann in New York. In 1884, he was made junior partner in the firm of Schwarzmann & Buchman. Schwarzmann retired in 1886, and Buchman began practicing under his own name. In 1887, he made Gustav Deisler junior partner in Buchman & Deisler. (Note: Deisler had worked for the Schwarzmann firm for several years and was a graduate of the technical schools of Stuttgart and Munich. After ending his association with Buchman, Deisler formed the contracting firm of Deisler & Stevenson.) This continued until 1899, when Deisler retired from the firm and Buchman associated with Mortimer J. Fox as Buchman & Fox. This partnership lasted until 1917, when Fox was appointed a vice president of the Columbia Bank. (Note: Fox's father, Joseph Fox, had been president of this bank from 1889 to 1916.)

After Fox retired, Buchman formed a fourth and final partnership with Ely Jacques Kahn, as Buchman & Kahn. Office manager John M. Montfort was also associated. Due to his health Buchman eventually retired, and in January, 1930 Kahn reestablished the practice as the Firm of Ely Jacques Kahn, in association with Montfort. Buchman died in New York, April 15, 1936.

Buchman was a member of the American Institute of Architects from 1921 to 1929.

== Architectural works ==
- Estherwood, Dobbs Ferry, New York, 1894.
- 695–709 Sixth Avenue NYC (aka Ehrich Brothers Store) -expansion, 1894 (as Buchman & Deisler)
- 636–640 Sixth Avenue NYC (aka Alexander Building), 1896 (as Buchman & Deisler)
- 7–9 West 18th Street NYC, 1896–97 (as Buchman & Deisler)
- New facade for the Hebrew Girls' School (later Henry Street Settlement), New York City, 1900
- 16 East 18th Street NYC, 1902 (as Buchman & Fox)
- Leonori Building, New York City, 1902
- 695–709 Sixth Avenue NYC (aka Ehrich Brothers Store) -expansion, 1902, (as Buchman & Fox)
- 18–22 West 18th Street NYC, 1902–04 (as Buchman & Fox)
- 162 Fifth Avenue NYC (aka Union Exchange Bank), 1903 (as Buchman & Fox)
- Hotel Le Marquis, New York City, 1905
- 684 Sixth Avenue NYC (alteration), 1905 (as Buchman & Fox)
- 85 Fifth Avenue NYC (aka Annin Building) – expansion, 1905, (as Buchman & Fox)
- 14–16 West 17th Street NYC, 1906–07 (as Buchman & Fox)
- 12–14 West 21st Street NYC, 1907 (as Buchman & Fox)
- 30–32 West 21st Street NYC, 1907 (as Buchman & Fox)
- B. Altman and Company Store, 615–629 Sixth Avenue NYC (alteration), 1909–10 & 1916–17, (as Buchman & Fox)
- 604–612 Sixth Avenue NYC (aka Price Building), 1910–1912 (as Buchman & Fox)
- 50–58 West 18th Street NYC (aka McCrorey Building), 1911–12 (as Buchman & Fox)
- The Times Square Building, New York City, 1912
- 125 Prince Street NYC, 1892-1893 (as Buchman & Deisler)
