= 2 Park Avenue =

Office building in Manhattan, New York

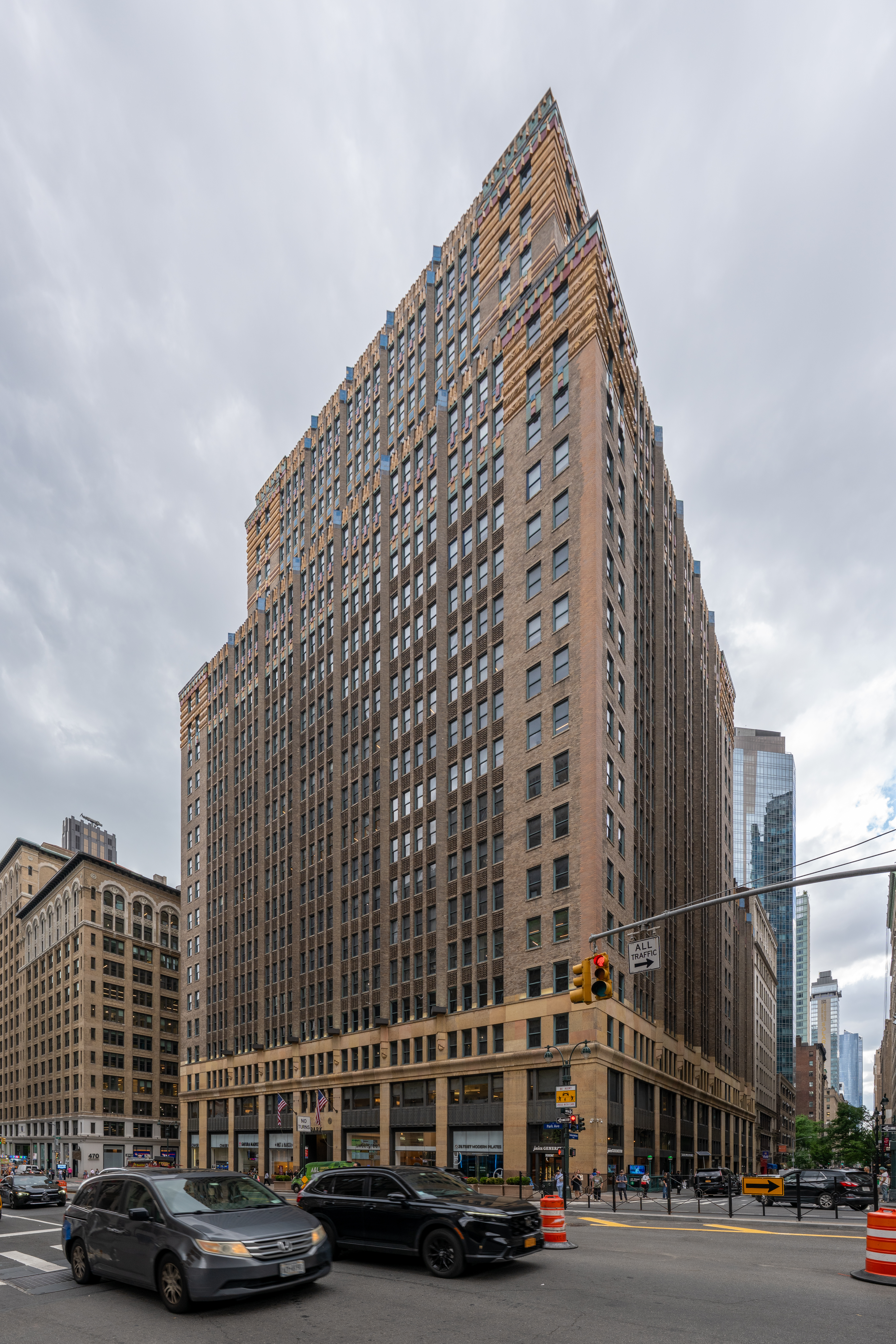
- Seen from across Park Avenue
- Interactive map of the 2 Park Avenue area

General information
- Type: Offices
- Architectural style: Art Deco
- Location: 2 Park Avenue, Manhattan, New York City, United States
- Coordinates: 40°44′47″N 73°58′57″W
- Groundbreaking: 1926
- Completed: 1928
- Owner: Haddad Brands

Height
- Height: 349 ft (106 m)

Technical details
- Structural system: Steel superstructure
- Material: Brick and terracotta facade
- Floor count: 28
- Lifts/elevators: 26

Design and construction
- Architect: Ely Jacques Kahn
- Developer: Abe N. Adelson
- Main contractor: Shroder & Koppel

New York City Landmark
- Designated: April 18, 2006
- Reference no.: 2186

2 Park Avenue is a 28-story office building in the Murray Hill neighborhood of Manhattan in New York City. The structure, along the west side of Park Avenue between 32nd and 33rd Streets, was designed by Ely Jacques Kahn and was developed by Abe N. Adelson from 1926 to 1928. The building, known for its facade of brick and colored architectural terracotta, is a New York City designated landmark.

The facade of the first three stories is made of stone and largely contains storefronts, except for a central entrance on Park Avenue. The lower section of the building occupies nearly its entire lot, and the building contains setbacks at the 11th, 18th, and 25th stories. The facade contains a polychrome color scheme above the 16th floor, including colored terracotta tiles manufactured by Léon-Victor Solon. The design of the vaulted main lobby dates to the 1970s, when decorations such as a mural by Winold Reiss were added. Office tenants over the years have included the Boy Scouts of America, as well as various textiles, clothing, media, and financial firms.

The site had been occupied by the Park Avenue Hotel since the 1870s. Developer Henry Mandel bought the hotel in 1925 in conjunction with a nearby development; he sold the site to Adelson, who erected the building and issued bonds to fund the project. The Continental Bank and Trust Company took over the building in foreclosure in 1935, and real-estate firm Webb and Knapp acquired it in 1953. After several sales in the 1960s, Sheldon Lewis Breitbart bought 2 Park Avenue's leasehold in 1962. Breitbart renovated the lobby after buying the building outright in 1976. Bernard H. Mendik acquired the building in 1986 after several of the building's limited partners accused Breitbart of impropriety. Mendik merged his company in 1997 with Vornado Realty Trust, which sold the building in 2003 to a German firm. Morgan Stanley Real Estate bought a majority stake in 2 Park Avenue in 2007 and sold it to Haddad Brands in 2024.

== Site ==
2 Park Avenue occupies the eastern section of a city block in the Murray Hill neighborhood of Manhattan in New York City. It is bounded by 32nd Street on the south, Park Avenue on the east, and 33rd Street on the north; the city block extends westward to Madison Avenue. The building's land lot has a total area of 40,500 sq ft (3,760 m^{2}). It measures 197.5 ft (60.2 m) from north to south and 205 ft (62 m) from west to east. Entrances to the New York City Subway's 33rd Street station are directly outside the building's northeast and southeast corners. The building is on the same block as 29 East 32nd Street to the west. Other nearby buildings include the Hotel Grand Union to the southwest, Madison Belmont Building to the northwest, 4 Park Avenue to the north, and 3 Park Avenue to the northeast.

The adjacent portion of Park Avenue slopes upward from south to north. The site was part of the 18th-century estate of merchant Robert Murray. In the 1860s, after the Park Avenue Tunnel was built, the segment of Fourth Avenue between 34th and 40th Streets was renamed Park Avenue, while the avenue's name south of 34th Street remained unchanged. Fourth and Park Avenues in Murray Hill had been developed with upscale residences by the 1870s.

The site had previously been occupied by the Park Avenue Hotel, which was built in 1878 by dry-goods businessman Alexander Turney Stewart and was originally a hotel for "working girls". This building was seven or eight stories high, with 502 rooms, and had an internal courtyard. Despite being destroyed in a 1902 fire that killed 17 people, the hotel was rebuilt and continued to operate for two decades. The New York Times described the hotel as "one of the most popular hostelries in New York City" when it was in operation.

== Architecture ==
2 Park Avenue was designed by Ely Jacques Kahn in the Art Deco style. It rises 28 or 29 stories and measures about 350 ft (110 m) to its roof. The lower section of the building occupies nearly its entire lot, but there is a light court facing west toward the adjacent building. On the western side of the building, there is a setback along 32nd and 33rd Street on the 11th story. There is a setback on all sides at the 18th story, above the tops of the western wings. The building has another setback at the 26th story; the top three stories are treated as a penthouse. The building's height was intended to maximize profit; since elevators and other service areas took up a significant part of the rentable area on upper stories, it would have been unprofitable to build a taller structure.

=== Facade ===
The western elevation of the facade, on Park Avenue, is divided into nine bays along each of the 1st through 17th stories and seven bays on each of the 18th through 25th stories. Generally, the two outermost bays are designed similarly to each other, and the central bays share a common design that contrasts with the outer bays. The northern and southern elevations are each divided into ten bays along each of the 1st through 17th stories. The easternmost seven bays are divided into two outer bays and five central bays (similar in design to the facade on Park Avenue), while the westernmost three bays are again different in design. These taper to six bays on the 18th through 25th stories.

The facade contains a polychrome color scheme above the 16th floor, which Kahn said was inspired by the texture of fabric. Kahn's friend Léon-Victor Solon designed the polychrome terracotta panels. These consisted of red, yellow, green, and blue panels with glazing, and black panels with a luster finish. According to Kahn's biographer Jewel Stern, Solon had been selected because he was "the nation's leading authority on architectural polychromy". At the time of the building's completion, few buildings used colored terracotta panels on facades, though such panels were characteristic of Kahn's work during the 1920s. Kahn had wanted to include decorative forms in the building's design, but typical sculpted ornamentation was difficult to see from the street. Unlike traditional decorations (which were applied to a completed curtain wall) the terracotta panels on 2 Park Avenue's facade are part of the curtain wall itself.

==== Base ====
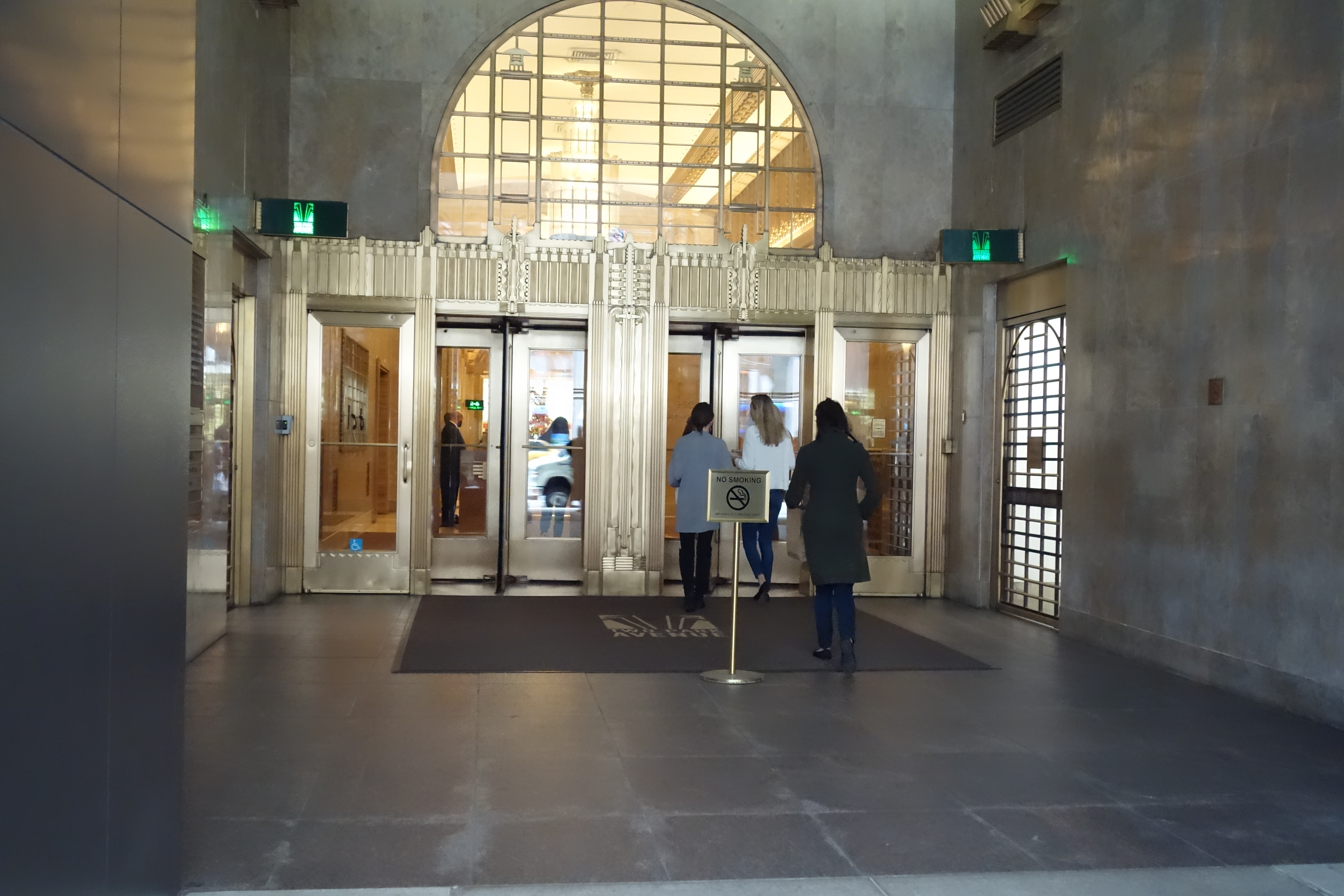
Main entrance doorway on Park Avenue

The main entrance is recessed within the central bay. The floors of the vestibule are paved in travertine. The main entrance to the lobby consists of two revolving bronze doors flanked by single bronze doors; all are decorated with geometric motifs. Above these is an ornate bronze transom bar, as well as a semicircular window. The transom contains motifs relating to machines, designed in a style resembling Frank Lloyd Wright's work. The mosaic ceiling was intended to evoke the design of a tapestry, with blue, black, and red tesserae as well as gold accents. The walls on either side are made of polished gray marble and originally contained light sconces. The side walls each contain a bronze door with an illuminated sign above it. The south wall also has a bronze tenant directory and the north wall contains a second door leading to the storefronts.

At the bottom of the 1st story is a water table made of granite. The 1st through 3rd stories are clad with tan stone, which blends in with the brick on the upper stories. The 1st and 2nd stories contain double-height openings, divided by vertical stone piers. The 1st story includes storefronts made of metal and glass, above which are horizontal spandrels made of cast iron. Panels were installed in front of these spandrels at some point in the 20th century before being removed. Each 2nd-story window is composed of a large central window between a pair of smaller sash windows, except in the central bay on Park Avenue, which contains four sash windows separated by triangular piers. There is a cyma reversa molding above these windows. On the 3rd story, the outermost two bays each contain two sash windows. The central bays are separated from each other by wide triangular piers; each bay has four narrow sash windows separated by flat pilasters.

The lowest three stories on Park Avenue, 32nd Street, and 33rd Street are similar, with minor exceptions. On 33rd Street, there is a secondary entrance in the fifth bay from east, with bronze and glass doors. An unused service entrance is placed on 32nd Street as well. The westernmost two bays on 32nd Street contain vehicular loading docks with roller shutters.

==== Upper stories ====
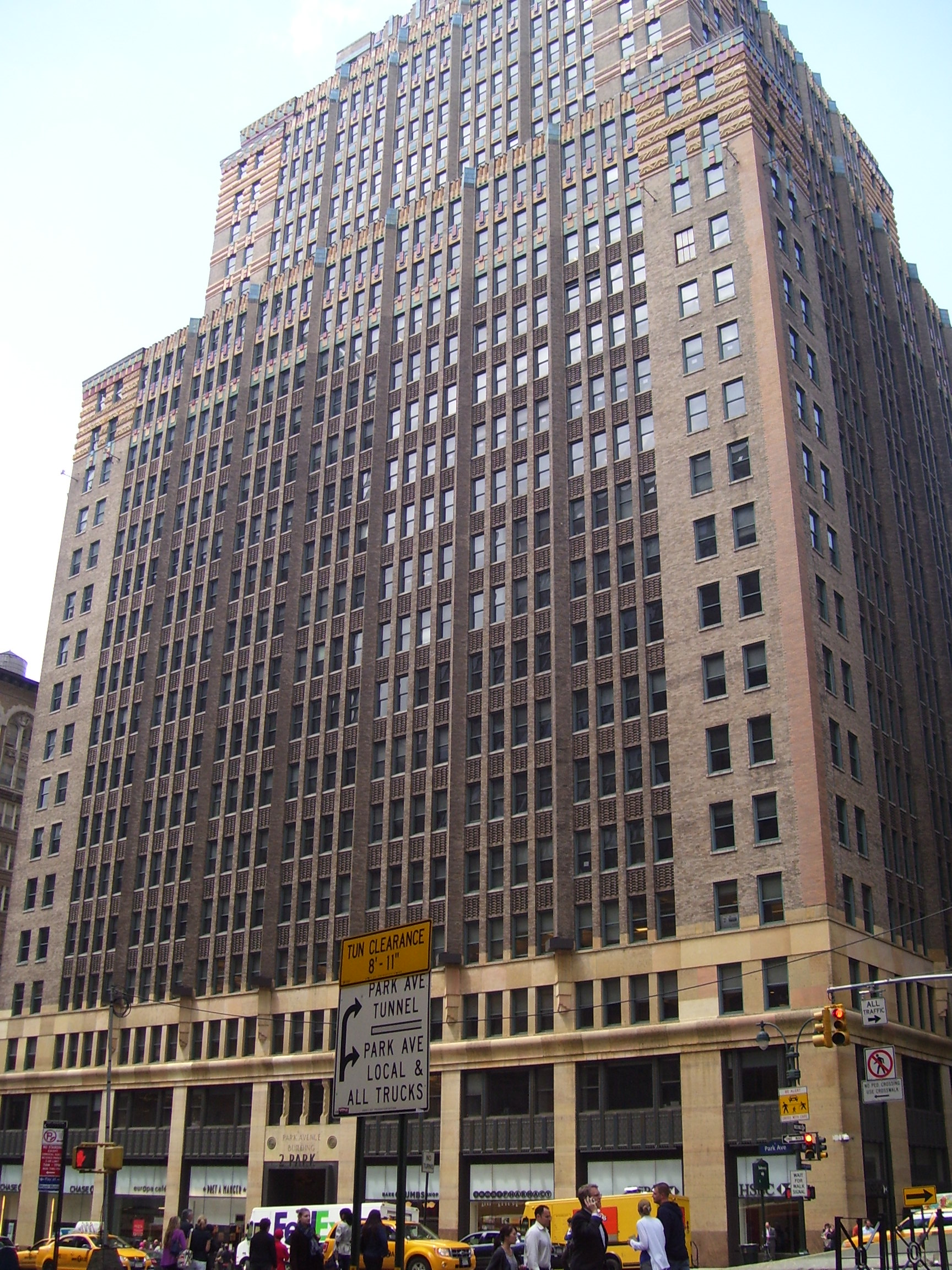
The Park Avenue elevation is divided into nine bays below the 17th floor. The central seven bays are similar to each other and contrast with the outer two bays, which are again similar to each other.

The upper stories are clad with brick. On all three elevations, at the 4th through 15th stories, each of the outer bays has two rectangular windows per floor, which are separated by flat pilasters. The flat brick surfaces of the outer bays contrast with the central bays' textured surfaces. Furthermore, the bricks in the outer bays are lighter in tone than with the bricks in the central bays, providing more visual contrast.

On all three elevations, each of the central bays contains four windows on each floor. The windows of each bay are separated vertically by narrow brick pilasters and horizontally by darker-brick spandrels, which are textured to resemble woven fabric. The spandrels alternately contain narrow brick headers, which project from the wall, and wider brick stretchers, which are flush with the wall. Furthermore, each four-window bay is separated by triangular brick piers, which are supported by stone corbels on the 3rd story and rise to the 17th story. At the setbacks, the brick piers are topped by blue terracotta panels. On the north and south elevations, the westernmost three bays are also faced with brick and divided by triangular piers, but there are only three windows per bay.

Between the 16th story and the roof are polychrome terracotta panels, designed with several geometric and abstract motifs. In the center bays, the spandrels above the 15th and 16th stories contain superimposed geometric motifs in red, yellow, green, and blue. The panels above the 17th story are treated as an attic section, with different designs above the central and outer bays. The central windows are topped by projecting yellow bars, while the brick piers are topped by blue terracotta. In the outermost bays, the 16th- and 17th-story windows are interspersed with horizontal bands of orange and yellow. Above the 17th story, the outer bays contain red, blue, and black bands (from bottom to top), each with vertical yellow bars. The outer panels above the 17th story contain curving shapes, the only curved motifs used in any of the terracotta panels.

Above the 18th to 22nd stories, there is a blue-on-yellow spandrel above each of the windows in the central bays. The outer bays contain horizontal orange-and-yellow bands between the windows on each story. The spandrels between the 24th and 25th stories contain geometric motifs in red, yellow, green, and blue, while the windows in the outer bays are interspersed with horizontal bands of orange and yellow. Above the 25th story, the central and outer bays are topped by ornament similar to that above the 17th story. The main difference is that the outer bays contain incisions above the 25th story. The top three stories are decorated similarly to the 16th and 17th and the 24th and 25th floors, except that the outer bays also have colored terracotta.

=== Interior ===
==== Ground level and lobby ====
The main entrance to the building is from Park Avenue, though the building also has entrances from 32nd and 33rd Streets, all connected via passageways. There was also an entrance from the subway station in the basement. The lobby's design largely consisted of bronze, marble, and mosaic tiles, arranged in overlaid geometric motifs. The passageway from Park Avenue contained travertine floors. Each of the walls consisted of a tall gray-marble wainscoting, above which was a gilded plaster frieze with motifs such as plants, chevrons, volutes, prisms, and column shapes. Octagonal bronze-and-glass chandeliers, with cantilevered glass panels, were initially suspended from the ceiling via metal rods. The Park Avenue lobby intersects a vaulted north–south passageway connecting 32nd and 33rd Streets. The north–south passageway originally had multi-tiered chandeliers, each containing eight bronze pendants. The north–south passageway contained an arch leading back to Park Avenue, which was topped by a colorful tympanum. The lights, mailbox, and radiator grilles were decorated similarly to the rest of the lobby.

In the 1950s, many of these decorations were replaced, while the ceiling was painted white. During a renovation in the 1970s, a Winold Reiss mural of New York City's skyline and Sabino glass chandeliers were added to the lobby. The mural came from a Longchamps restaurant at 59th Street and Madison Avenue, while the chandeliers came from a Simpsons department store in Toronto, Ontario. The ceiling was also painted blue. Originally, there were also nine storefronts at ground level.

==== Other interior spaces ====
Below street level are freight and loading platforms. Each of the lowest floors spans 40,000 ft^{2} (3,700 m^{2}). Above the 17th-story setback, each of the floors are 22,500 ft^{2} (2,090 m^{2}). Though 2 Park Avenue could accommodate both offices and showrooms, its developers also wanted the ability to lease the space to manufacturers if there were not enough office or showroom tenants. At the time of the building's construction, up to 25 percent of the space could be used for manufacturing. Consequently, 2 Park Avenue's floor slabs contained a high floor–load capacity, and it also included freight elevators and other services.

The building contains 26 elevators. At ground level, the elevators are clustered where the passageways from each entrance intersect. On the remaining stories, there are mechanical rooms surrounding each elevator bank. The superstructure used 10,000 short tons (8,900 long tons; 9,100 t) of steel. The 1st through 17th stories are divided by piers, which are spaced 21 to 22 feet (6.4 to 6.7 m) apart at their centers; at the rear of each story, the piers are spaced more closely. The ceilings measured 12 feet (3.7 m) high, providing large work spaces for industrial tenants. The work spaces above the 17th story were generally shallower, accommodating office tenants. On the 20th floor is a business center with a coworking space, 74 offices, and meeting rooms.

== History ==
The developer Henry Mandel acquired the lots on the eastern side of Fourth Avenue between 32nd and 33rd Street in 1923 under the name "One Park Avenue Corporation". He intended to erect an office building on the site. Since the house numbering system reset at the southern end of Park Avenue, buildings between 32nd and 34th Streets originally had Fourth Avenue addresses. Park Avenue was extended southward from 34th to 32nd Street in 1924, but controversies over the renaming continued until 1930. The site of the Park Avenue Hotel had long been difficult to redevelop because it faced a streetcar depot across Park Avenue, which was demolished to make way for 1 Park Avenue.

=== Development ===
Mandel bought the old Park Avenue Hotel in May 1925, with plans to build 2 Park Avenue, a 35-story office building, on the site. He immediately started planning for the new development, even though the hotel continued to operate under a lease that did not expire until 1927. Mandel wanted to connect 1 and 2 Park Avenue via an underpass that also provided access to the subway. The Park Avenue Hotel site was sold again in April 1926, this time to Abe N. Adelson, who formed the Two Park Avenue Corporation to develop the building. That September, the Park Avenue Hotel closed and all its furnishings were sold off. The hotel was demolished the same year.

Ely Jacques Kahn was hired to develop alternative plans for an industrial building or an office building, since the owners did not know what to develop on the site. Kahn's firm Buchman and Kahn created four separate sketches of the building in four months. The first sketch, scheme A, called for a base with multiple setbacks and a central tower with a pyramidal roof. Scheme B was a variation of scheme A with diagonal corners and without a pyramidal roof. Schemes C and D also depicted a central tower above a base with multiple setbacks, but the setbacks in scheme D were simpler than those in scheme C. The final plans called for a much simpler massing without a tower. Buchman and Kahn filed plans for a building at 2 Park Avenue, to cost $4 million, in October 1926. The structure was to be designed in the Art Deco style, making it one of the first office buildings in Manhattan to be designed in that style. To maximize usable space, Kahn designed the structure as a nearly square block with large floor areas and a light court in the rear.

Solon and Kahn created mockups of the facade's terracotta panels using plaster and cardboard boxes. The Federal Terra Cotta Company then created full-sized mockups of the panels to see how they looked from 250 feet (76 m) away. Though Adelson doubted the effectiveness of these designs, consulting architect Raymond Hood reassured the developer of Kahn's expertise. Halley, Knox & Koenig provided a $1.25 million mortgage on the site in December 1926. The following month, S. W. Straus & Co. provided $9 million in permanent financing including a $6.5 million first mortgage. Straus had also tried to convince Kahn to tone down the colorful design, but Kahn replied that his panels would be less expensive than traditional sculptured decoration. Straus established the Park Avenue and 33rd Street Corporation, which would issue $6.5 million in sinking fund bonds, secured by the land and building.

Steel contractors Shroder & Koppel began erecting the steel superstructure at the end of March 1927, at which point over one-fifth of the building was leased. That July, the New York Building Congress gave craftsmanship awards to many workers who were involved in construction. By November 1927, the building was nearly fully leased. Two months later, the Two Park Avenue Corporation hosted a dinner in which it presented a ceremonial cup to Adelson, honoring his involvement in the building's development.

=== 1920s to 1940s ===
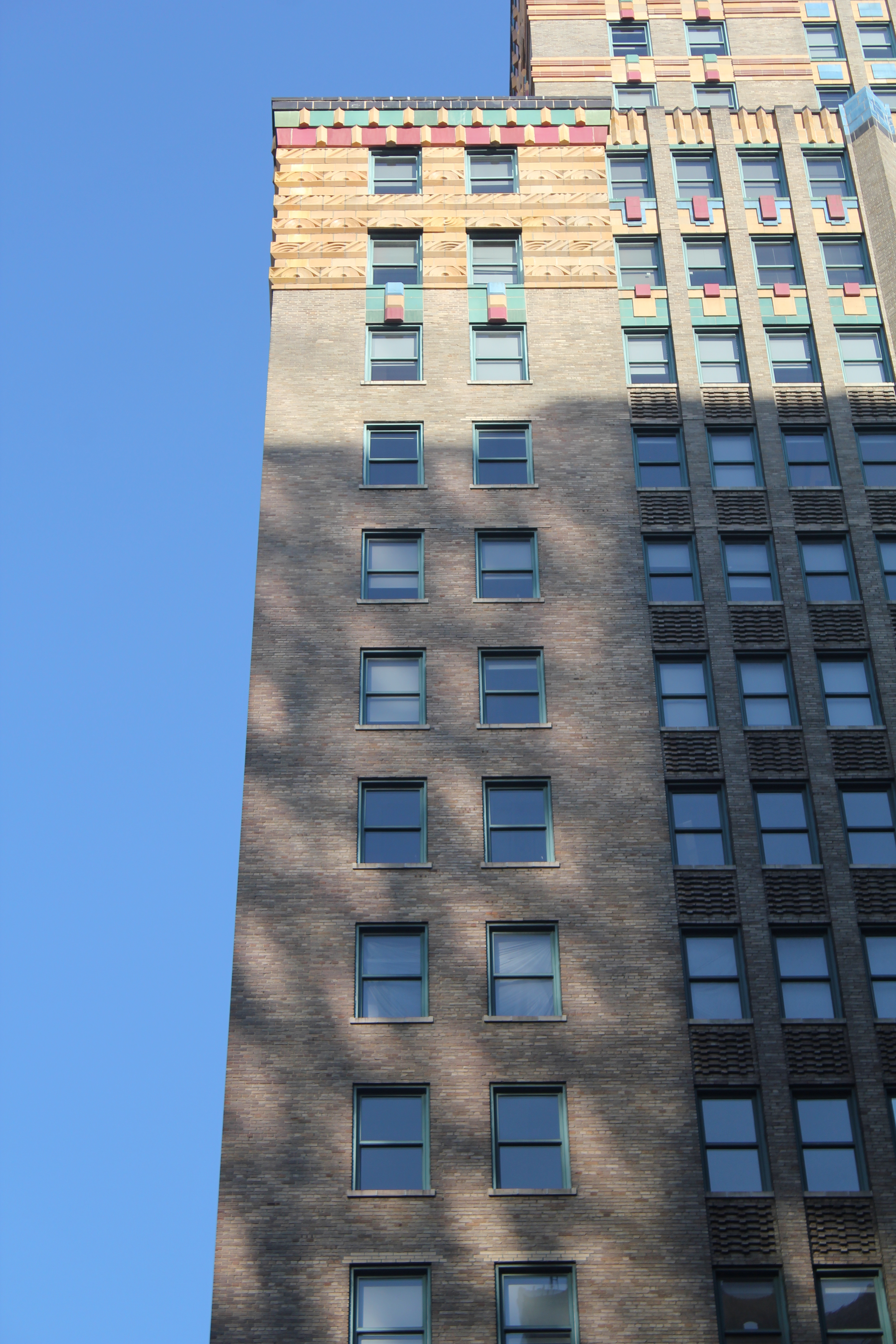
Outer-bay detail

When the building was completed, its storefronts were occupied by Seward National Bank, Block, Maloney & Co., and the Bloomsburg Silk Mill. Several dry goods and textiles merchants occupied the lower floors, including Mills & Gibb. Among the largest tenants were Peierle, Buhler & Co. and Robert Reis & Co., which each occupied three full floors. On the 17th floor were the national headquarters of the Boy Scouts of America. Occupants of the 18th through 25th stories included the United States Leather Company, the Building Trades Employers' Association, and advertising firm Gardiner & Wells. The Building Trades Employers' Association, which occupied the entire 25th floor, sought to name the building the "New York Builders' Exchange". The top two floors were the offices of Buchman & Kahn, the building's own architects. The Tammany Hall political organization also temporarily leased space at 2 Park Avenue while its permanent home at 44 Union Square was being completed.

The Straus National Bank and Trust Company placed a $2.5 million second mortgage on the property in July 1929. At the time, the building's brokers cited 2 Park Avenue as being fully rented. The same year, real-estate developer Robert W. Phillips cited 2 Park Avenue as one of several successful tall buildings that had been recently developed. Among the building's tenants in the early 1930s were the Royal Typewriter Company, the Metropolitan Life Insurance Company, shirt manufacturer Cluett Peabody & Company, several leather companies, and several handkerchief manufacturers. By February 1934, the Continental Bank and Trust Company sought to foreclose on the $6.5 million first mortgage from S. W. Straus & Co. At the time, 8,000 individuals owned $8.175 million in outstanding bonds on the building, over two-thirds of which agreed on a reorganization plan. The building was auctioned in August 1934 and Continental took over the building that month. In the nine months after the reorganization, 2 Park Avenue had $225,000 in net profit.

Hunter College officials leased three and a half floors at 2 Park Avenue in February 1936, after Hunter's existing building burned down, and the college added several classrooms and study halls to the space within three weeks. Hunter continued to lease space at 2 Park Avenue for several years. Other tenants during the 1940s included the Bibb Manufacturing Company, the Home Owners' Loan Corporation, the United States Mission to the United Nations, and a regional office of the National Labor Relations Board. In particular, the United Nations mission's presence led The New York Times to characterize 2 Park Avenue as "our global embassy on Park Avenue". In 1947, Two Park Avenue Building Inc. refinanced the building with a $4.76 million mortgage, replacing the original first mortgage.

=== 1950s to 1970s ===
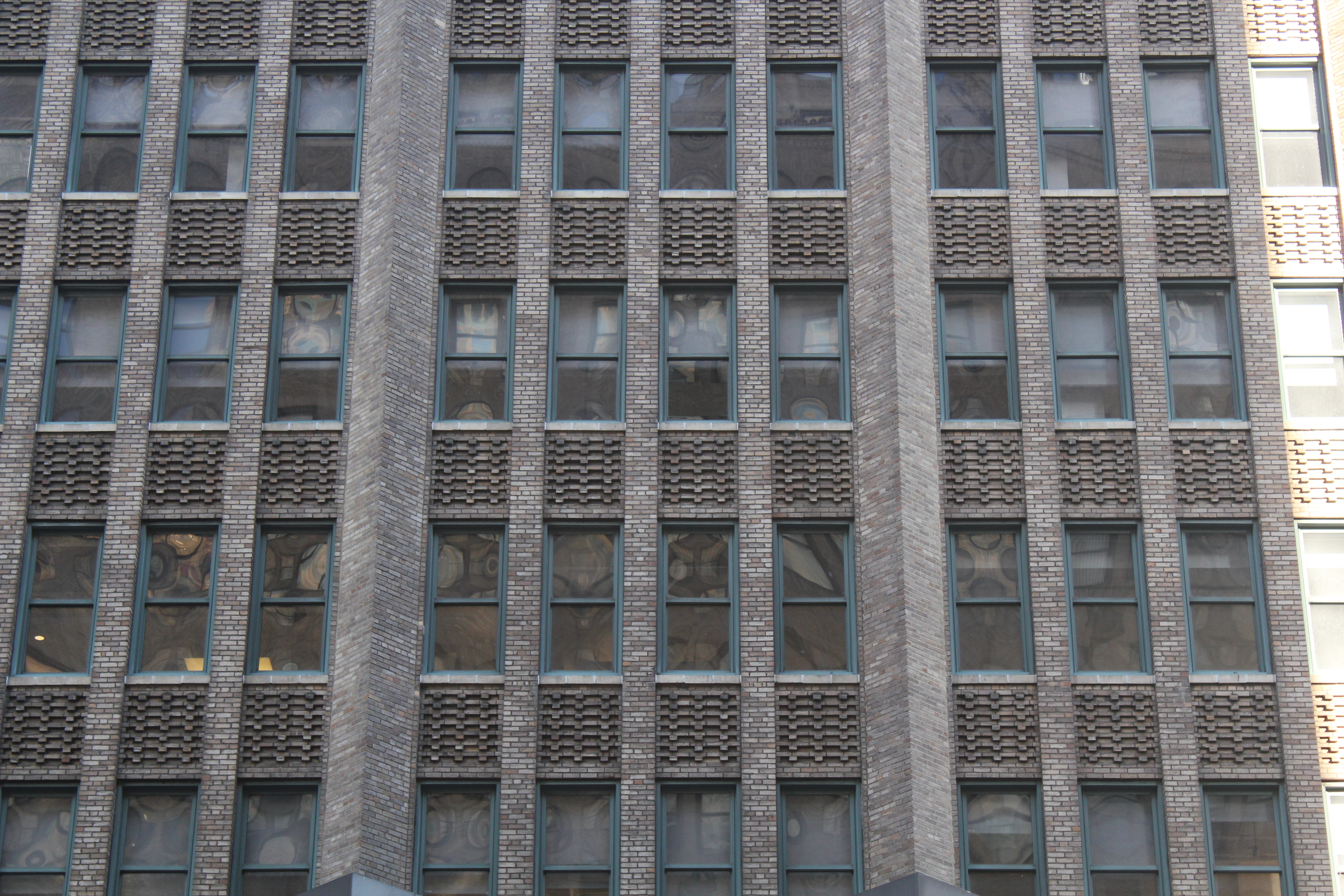
Detail of windows and spandrels in central bays

Bankers Trust leased some space in the 1950s, as did the Free Europe Committee. Real-estate firm Webb and Knapp acquired control of 2 Park Avenue in April 1953, paying off a $2.7 million mortgage. That November, the Connecticut Life Insurance Company provided a $6.75 million mortgage loan for 2 Park Avenue to Webb and Knapp. During the 1950s, the building was 98 percent occupied by companies in a variety of trades. These included the Boy Scouts, the Blue Shield Association, Chase Manhattan Bank, the Empire City Savings Bank, the Federal Housing Administration, Phoenix Mutual Life Insurance, and Radio Free Europe. The law firm of Herrick Feinstein also leased some space in 1957 and stayed for over half a century, while publisher W. A. Benjamin leased space in the 1960s. Over a five-year period in the late 1950s and early 1960s, the building underwent a $3 million renovation, which included automating 16 manually operated elevators.

By 1960, Webb and Knapp was struggling financially and had sold off a partial ownership stake in 2 Park Avenue and several of its other buildings. William Zeckendorf, the chairman of Webb and Knapp, subsequently testified that the building was sold in June 1959 to Chicago businessman Henry Crown, with a caveat that Zeckendorf had to buy it back if certain criteria were met. Crown asked Zeckendorf to buy back the building in January 1961, and Zeckendorf hired Samuel Lemberg to buy 2 Park Avenue, which Lemberg then sold to Joseph Lubin. In June 1962, Sheldon Lewis Breitbart of the Breitbart Corporation bought 2 Park Avenue's leasehold from a limited partnership, Two Park Avenue Company. The next month, Breitbart sold the leasehold for $8.35 million back to Two Park Avenue Company. One of Zeckendorf's trustees, Mortimer M. Caplin, sued Zeckendorf in 1967, alleging the transactions were part of a trend of mismanagement. Caplin dropped his complaints against the 2 Park Avenue transactions in 1972 in return for a $35,000 settlement.

Breitbart bought the land and building outright in 1976, paying $4 million to Ann L. Goldstein and Barbara Goldsmith. The next year, Breitbart hired Kwan Lau and Beverly Birks to renovate the lobby with Art Deco decorations that were popular in the mid-20th century. During that decade, 2 Park Avenue's tenants included publisher E. P. Dutton, the editorial offices of Harper's Magazine, and the offices of Esquire magazine. In addition, the building's retail tenants included French restaurant La Coupole.

=== 1980s and 1990s ===
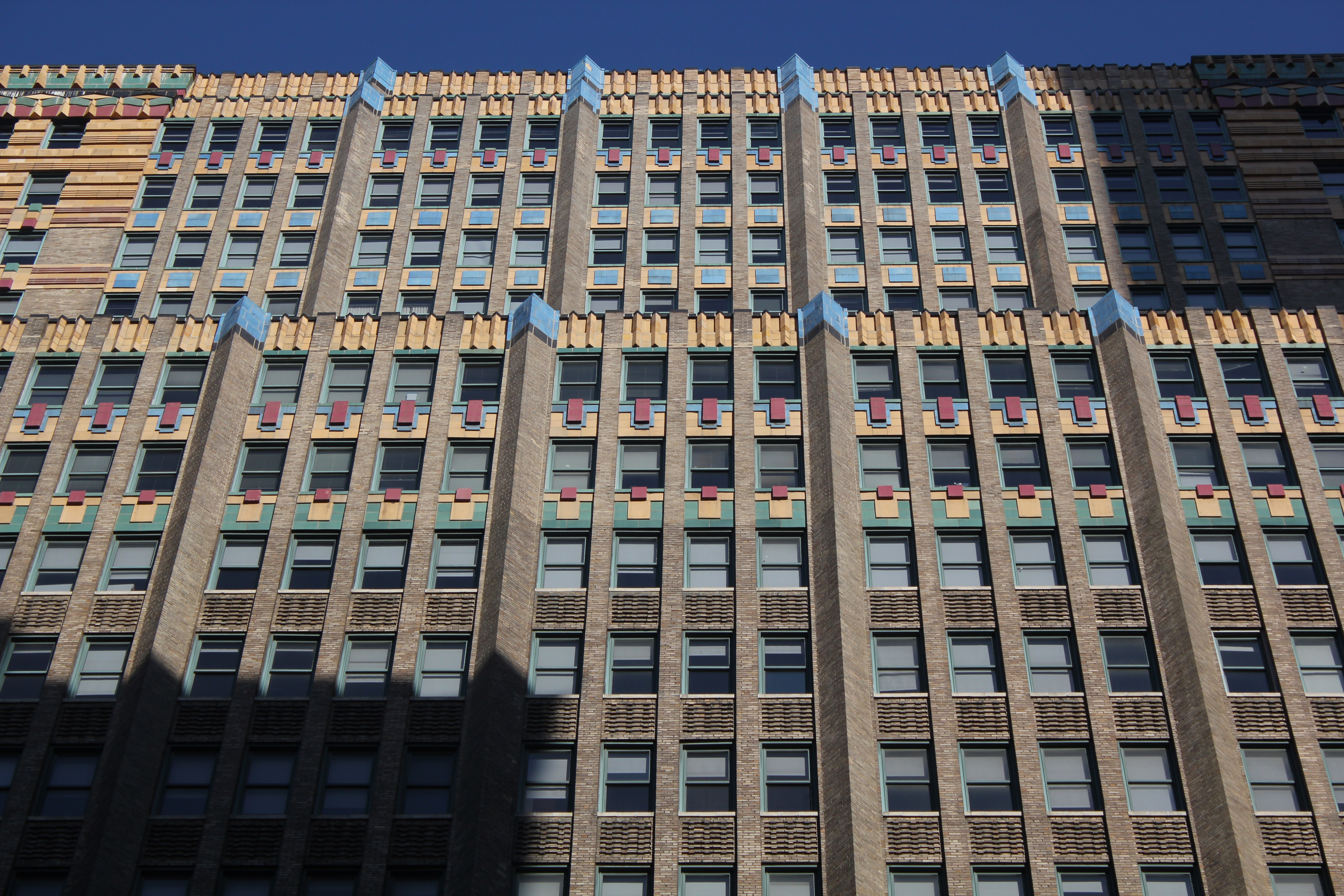
Polychrome terracotta ornament

The lawyer Alan E. Bandler secretly bought a share in the building's ownership in 1982 after Breitbart had refused to allow Bandler's associate, Julien Studley, buy an ownership stake. Bandler and Studley bought more shares in 2 Park Avenue over the next two years, but Breitbart also refused to acknowledge that the men were partial owners. In an attempt to gain total ownership of the building, Bandler and Studley convinced some of the building's 1,040 limited partners to file a class action lawsuit against Breitbart, on the basis that he had paid "unauthorized and excessive management fees" to himself and to his wife Barbara. The New York Supreme Court ruled in Breitbart's favor, but acting Court of Appeals justice Francis Pecora reversed the Supreme Court's decision. The appeals court ruled that Breitbart had to pay $6 million in damages, forced Breitbart to resign as the building's general partner, and appointed John Bower as a receiver to sell the property. Bandler alleged that Breitbart should not be allowed to sell 2 Park Avenue unless Breitbart recognized Bandler's ownership stake.

Bower hired the Williams Real Estate Company, which recommended that the building be sold immediately so the limited partners could receive capital gains tax relief. The building was sold at auction in December 1986 to a syndicate of Bernard Mendik and EF Hutton for $151 million. Despite not providing documentation for his work, Bower was paid $7.7 million for his role in the receivership proceedings, or about $4,000 an hour. This was about 70 times higher than the next-largest payment for a receivership proceeding in New York state. This represented five percent of the total sale price, the maximum allowed under state law. Breitbart appealed the award in February 1988, prompting the weekly newspaper Manhattan Lawyer to publish three articles about the transaction. The state appellate division vacated Bower's fee that June, but Pecora restored it that August without holding a hearing. After another appeal in December 1988, the appellate division reduced the payment to $5 million, citing the "complex nature and extremely high quality of the service rendered"; this was still 40 times higher than the next-largest payment to a receiver in New York.

In the 1990s, the building contained the headquarters of New York Newsday, the New York City edition of Long Island daily newspaper Newsday. The American Place restaurant also opened in the building at that time. Despite the early-1990s economic downturn, 2 Park Avenue and Mendik's other properties remained over 95 percent occupied because of what Crain's New York described as Mendik's "reputation for quality management". In 1996, Mendik announced that he would form a real estate investment trust to control seven of his properties in Midtown Manhattan, including 2 Park Avenue. This move would allow Mendik to raise up to $220 million. The next year, Mendik announced his company would merge with Steven Roth's Vornado Realty Trust, giving Vornado control of 2 Park Avenue and Mendik's other properties. By the late 1990s, the neighborhood was a hub for publishing companies, and Matthew Bender & Company and Times Mirror Company occupied 2 Park Avenue.

=== 2000s to present ===
A branch of cheese restaurant Artisanal opened in the building in 2001, and Hartford Financial Services moved to the building that year after being displaced in the September 11 attacks. Vornado placed the building for sale in May 2003; at the time, it was 99 percent leased. That August, German firm SEB Immobililien-Investment GmbH agreed to buy the building for $157 million. Its tenants at the time included the Tribune Company (succeeded by the Bonnier Corporation), Simplicity Pattern, The New York Community Trust, and United Way of New York City. Several tenants also leased space in the mid-2000s, including life-insurance company Penn Mutual and fragrance company Coty Inc. The New York City Landmarks Preservation Commission (LPC) designated 2 Park Avenue and the nearby 404 Fifth Avenue as official city landmarks on April 18, 2006. L&L Holding and General Electric Pension Trust bought 2 Park Avenue the same year for $450 million and refinanced the building in an all-cash transaction. Morgan Stanley Real Estate paid $519 million for a majority stake in the building in early 2007.

Cushman & Wakefield took over leasing at the building in 2010. Among the major office tenants in the early 2010s were fashion firm Kate Spade New York as well as British Airways, the American Society of Mechanical Engineers, the North Shore-LIJ Health System, and Gilt Groupe. The building's commercial tenants included Europa Café, Crumbs Bake Shop, and Pret a Manger, which faced competition from food trucks on Park Avenue. The building's manager requested in 2011 that the New York City Department of Transportation create a no-idling zone outside 2 Park Avenue; he claimed that food-truck owners had caused thousands of dollars in damage, resulting in complaints from tenants. By 2014, the building was fully leased after clothing company Talbots leased some retail space. Other tenants in the mid-2010s included textiles firm Delta Galil Industries and technology firm The Trade Desk.

In 2024, Haddad Brands agreed to pay Morgan Stanley about $360 million for 2 Park Avenue. The sale, coming at a time when many office buildings in the U.S. were being sold at discounted rates, came at a 31% discount from the price that Morgan Stanley had paid in 2007. After Haddad Brands bought the building, it leased space to multiple firms, including Via Transportation and the City University of New York. By mid-2026, the building was nearly fully leased.

== Reception ==
Of all buildings that Ely Jacques Kahn designed, 2 Park Avenue received the most attention from architectural critics. Near the building's completion, Solon brought Michael A. Mikkelson of Architectural Record, to see the building. Mikkelson thought the building began "a new chapter in the history of sky-scraper design". The visit also prompted Mikkelson to publish a 22-page "Portfolio of Current Architecture" in April 1928, featuring 2 Park Avenue exclusively. When the building was completed, architectural critic Lewis Mumford praised the building's facade, massing, and interior, in spite of his general disdain toward skyscrapers. Mumford said the form and facade combined to create "the boldest and clearest note among all our recent achievements in skyscraper architecture". Architectural Record described the building's lobby as "probably the most impressive in the country".

The photographer Cervin Robinson took an image of 2 Park Avenue, with the Empire State Building behind it, for his 1975 book Skyscraper Style: Art Deco New York. This led Paul Goldberger of The New York Times to describe the scene as one of several that "deserve to become classics". When the building's lobby was renovated in 1977, Goldberger wrote: "It is all bright, shiny and full of enthusiasm for Art Deco", criticizing only the blue ceiling. Architectural historian Anthony W. Robins described 2 Park Avenue as containing one of the "most striking Art Deco facades" in New York City. According to writers Jewel Stern and John A. Stuart, 2 Park Avenue was "the project that confirmed Kahn's reputation as a modernist".

== See also ==
- Art Deco architecture of New York City
- List of New York City Designated Landmarks in Manhattan from 14th to 59th Streets
