= Beaux-Arts Ball =

Annual costume ball

The Beaux-Arts Ball (in French the Bal des Quatres Arts) is the annual costume ball traditionally given by the students of the École nationale supérieure des Beaux-Arts in Paris in the spring, in the École building on the rue Bonaparte overlooking the Seine. Elaborately allegorical floats circled the room at midnight and were judged by a panel. "It is a riot, a revival of paganism, known elsewhere only in Italy. It is also, in its way, a hymn to beauty, a living explosion of the senses and the emotions," wrote E. Berry Wall in Neither Pest Nor Puritan. Its reputation for fabulously designed nudity, louche antics, cross-dressing and high style encouraged imitators in American cities. In 1931, in New York, famous architects dressed up as their buildings and today, many American architecture schools hold similar costume balls.

Reference to the Beaux-Arts Ball is made in the verse of the popular Rodgers and Hart song "The Lady Is a Tramp" from Babes in Arms (1937).
