= Robert Allan Jacobs =

American architect and designer

- Born: September 16, 1905; New York City
- Died: November 4, 1993 (aged 88); Pawling, New York
- Occupation: Architect
- Awards: Fellow of the American Institute of Architects (1953)
- Practice: Kahn & Jacobs

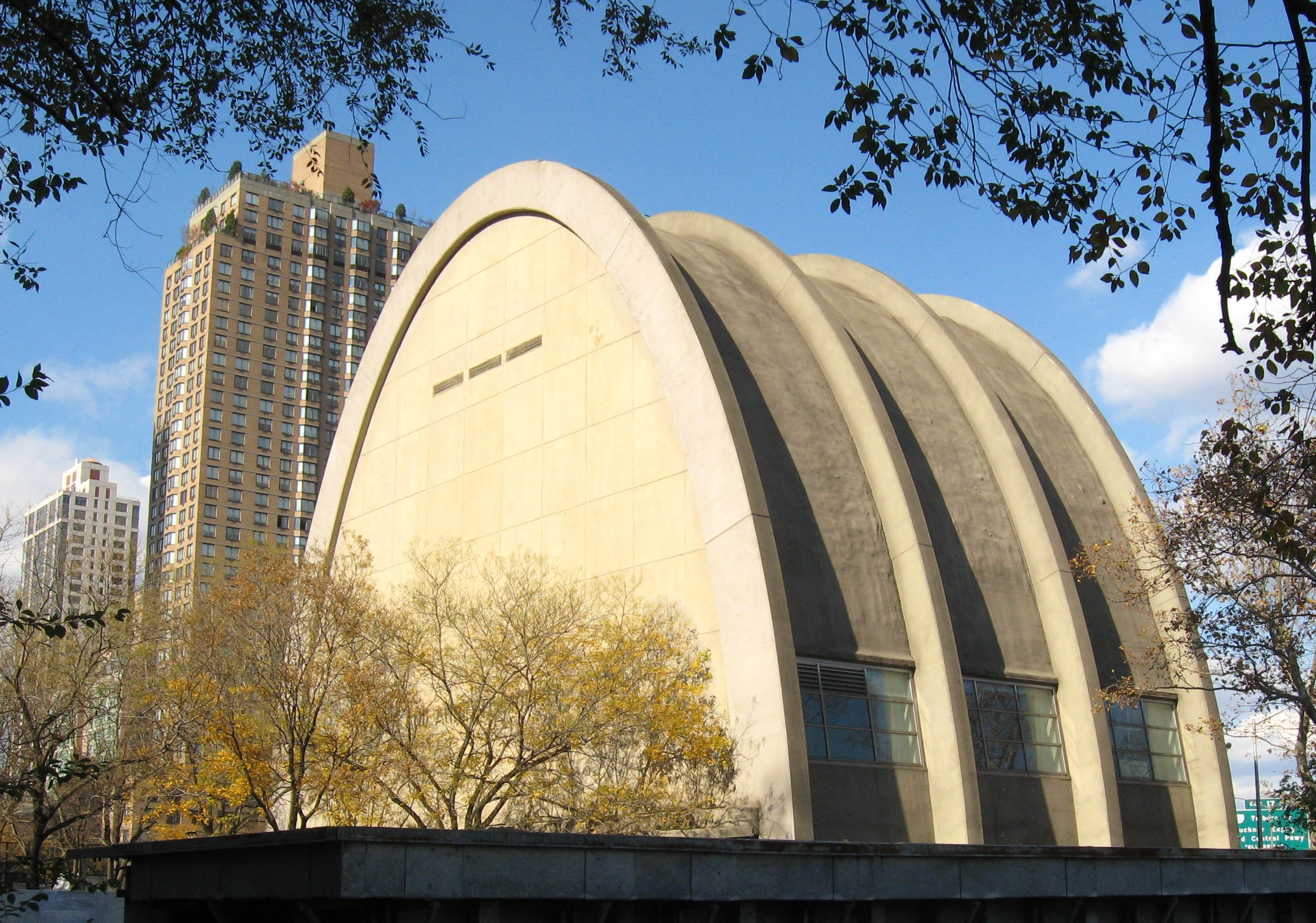
The Municipal Asphalt Plant in New York City, designed by Kahn & Jacobs and completed in 1944.

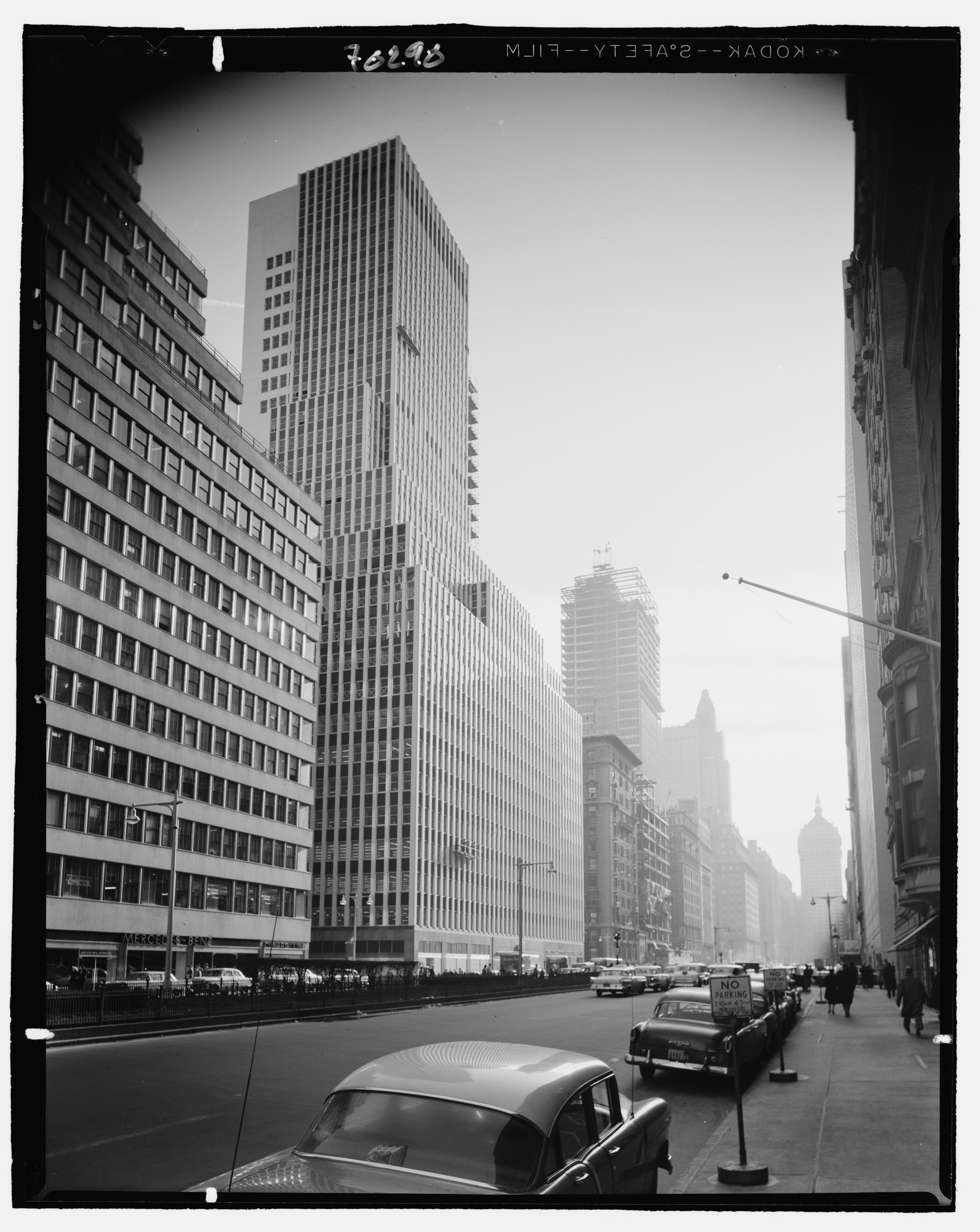
425 Park Avenue in New York City, completed in 1957.

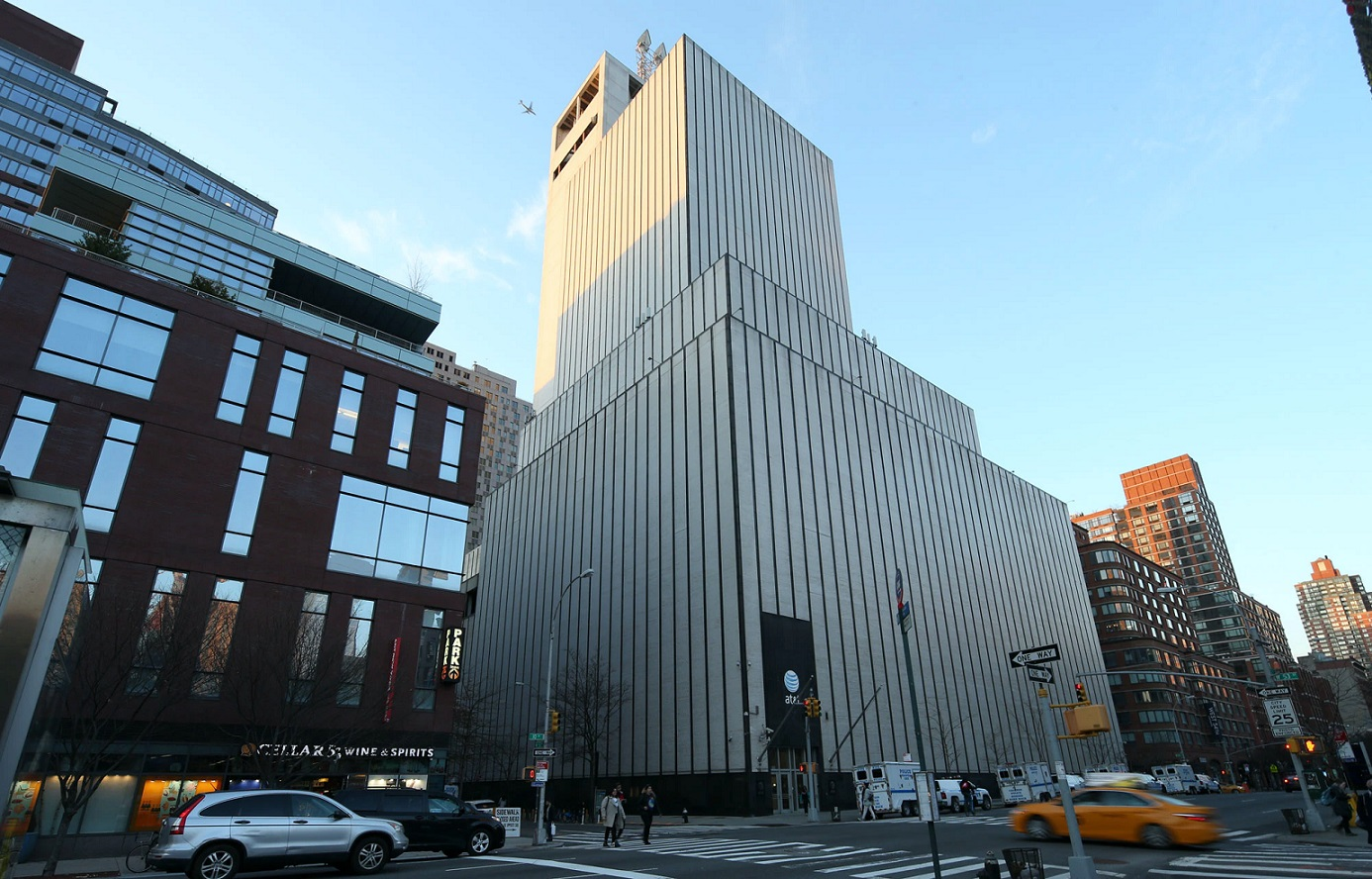
811 Tenth Avenue in New York City, completed in 1964.

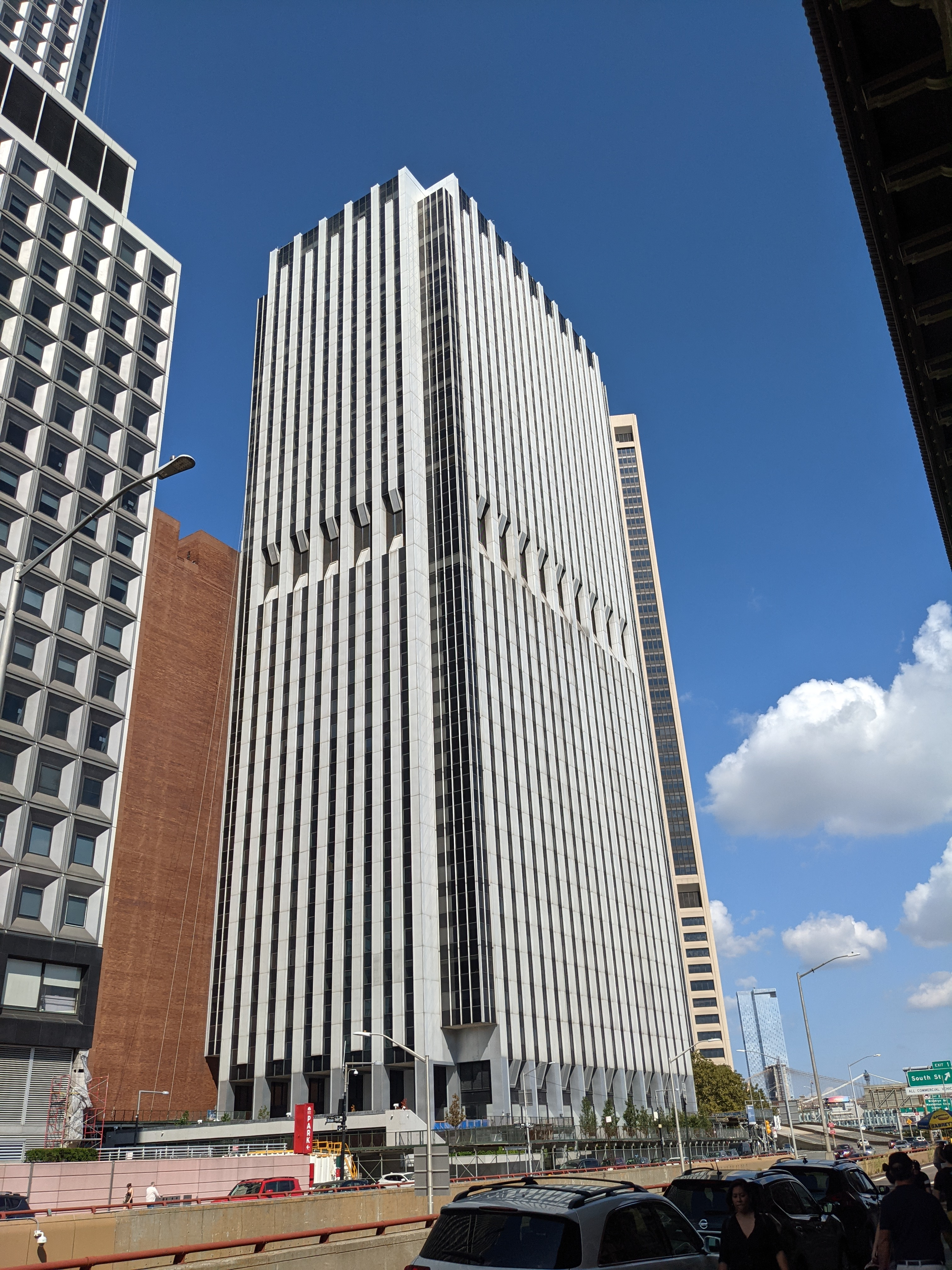
2 New York Plaza in New York City, completed in 1971.

Robert Allan Jacobs FAIA (1905-1993) was an American architect in practice in New York City from 1935 to 1976. From 1939 until 1965 he was the partner of Ely Jacques Kahn in the firm of Kahn & Jacobs.

== Life and career ==
Jacobs was born September 16, 1905, in New York City to Harry Allan Jacobs, an architect, and Elsie (Wolf) Jacobs. He was educated at Amherst College and at Columbia University, graduating from the latter in 1934. After graduation he traveled to Paris, where he worked in the studio of architect Le Corbusier during the winter of 1934–35. He then returned to the United States, where he joined the New York City office of Harrison & Fouilhoux. In the fall of 1935 Corbusier traveled to the United States for a lecture tour, and Jacobs served as his guide and interpreter from October to December. Jacobs then returned to Harrison, remaining with him until 1938, when he joined the firm of Ely Jacques Kahn, a close friend of his late father. He became a junior partner in 1939 and a full partner in 1941 in the reorganized Kahn & Jacobs. Among their first works as partners was the Municipal Asphalt Plant (1944). Jacobs claimed credit for the design, which he based on the work of engineer Eugène Freyssinet. Otherwise the firm built on their previous reputation for the design of large office buildings. These, designed both independently and with others, include:

- 445 Park Avenue, New York City (1947)
- 100 Park Avenue, New York City (1950)
- 1407 Broadway, New York City (1950)
- 425 Park Avenue, New York City (1957, demolished 2016)
- Seagram Building, New York City (1958)
- Travelers Building, Boston (1959, demolished 1988)
- 399 Park Avenue, New York City (1961)
- One Constitution Plaza, Hartford, Connecticut (1963)
- 811 Tenth Avenue, New York City (1964)
- 810 Seventh Avenue, New York City (1969)
- Jacob K. Javits Federal Building, New York City (1969)
- 1 New York Plaza, New York City (1970)
- 2 New York Plaza, New York City (1971)
- AT&T City Center, Birmingham, Alabama (1972)
- One Astor Plaza, New York City (1972)
- One Penn Plaza, New York City (1972)
- 1095 Avenue of the Americas, New York City (1973)

Their particular expertise in office building design led to the firm's employment as associate architect for the Seagram Building, designed by Mies van der Rohe and Philip Johnson.

Other projects include:

- Carver Houses, New York City (1958)
- Terrence Building, Rochester, New York (1959)
- American Airlines Terminal 8, John F. Kennedy International Airport, Queens (1960, demolished 2007)

Kahn and Jacobs had frequent disagreements during the later years of their partnership, and Kahn retired from practice in 1965. Jacobs continued the firm under the same name with partners Lloyd A. Doughty, Sheldon Fox and Irving H. Kaplan and associates including Der Scutt. By 1972 Jacobs was also considering retirement, and considered an offer by Doughty, Fox and Kaplan to purchase his share in the firm. This was ultimately rejected and he sold the firm to Hellmuth, Obata & Kassabaum (HOK) of St. Louis. Friction quickly developed between designers from Kahn & Jacobs and HOK. Several, including Fox and Scutt, soon left. Though he had intended to retire, HOK considered Jacobs valuable for client relations purposes and he remained as president of the subsidiary Kahn & Jacobs/Hellmuth, Obata & Kassabaum until 1976, when the Kahn & Jacobs name was retired and the office fully merged with HOK. From then until his retirement in 1982 he was chair of the firm's advisory board.

Jacobs joined the American Institute of Architects in 1940 and was elected a fellow in 1953. He also served as president of the Architectural League of New York from 1962 to 1964 and was affiliated with the Manhattan Council of the Boy Scouts of America, the National Institute for Architectural Education, the International Union of Architects and the Municipal Art Society.

== Personal life ==
Jacobs was married in 1934 to Frances Cullman in New York City. They had three children: Frances, Barbara and Robert Allan Jr. They divorced in 1956 and he remarried in 1966 to Margot (Helland) Koehler. Jacobs died November 4, 1993, at home in Pawling, New York, at the age of 88. After his death his papers were donated to Columbia University by his widow, Margot Jacobs.

== See also ==
- Kahn & Jacobs architectural drawings and records, 1893-1965, bulk 1893-1950, Columbia University Libraries Archival Collections
- Robert Allan Jacobs papers, 1890s-1990s, bulk 1909-1983, Columbia University Libraries Archival Collections
