= Municipal Asphalt Plant =

Recreation center in Manhattan, New York

- U.S. National Register of Historic Places
- New York State Register of Historic Places
- New York City Landmark
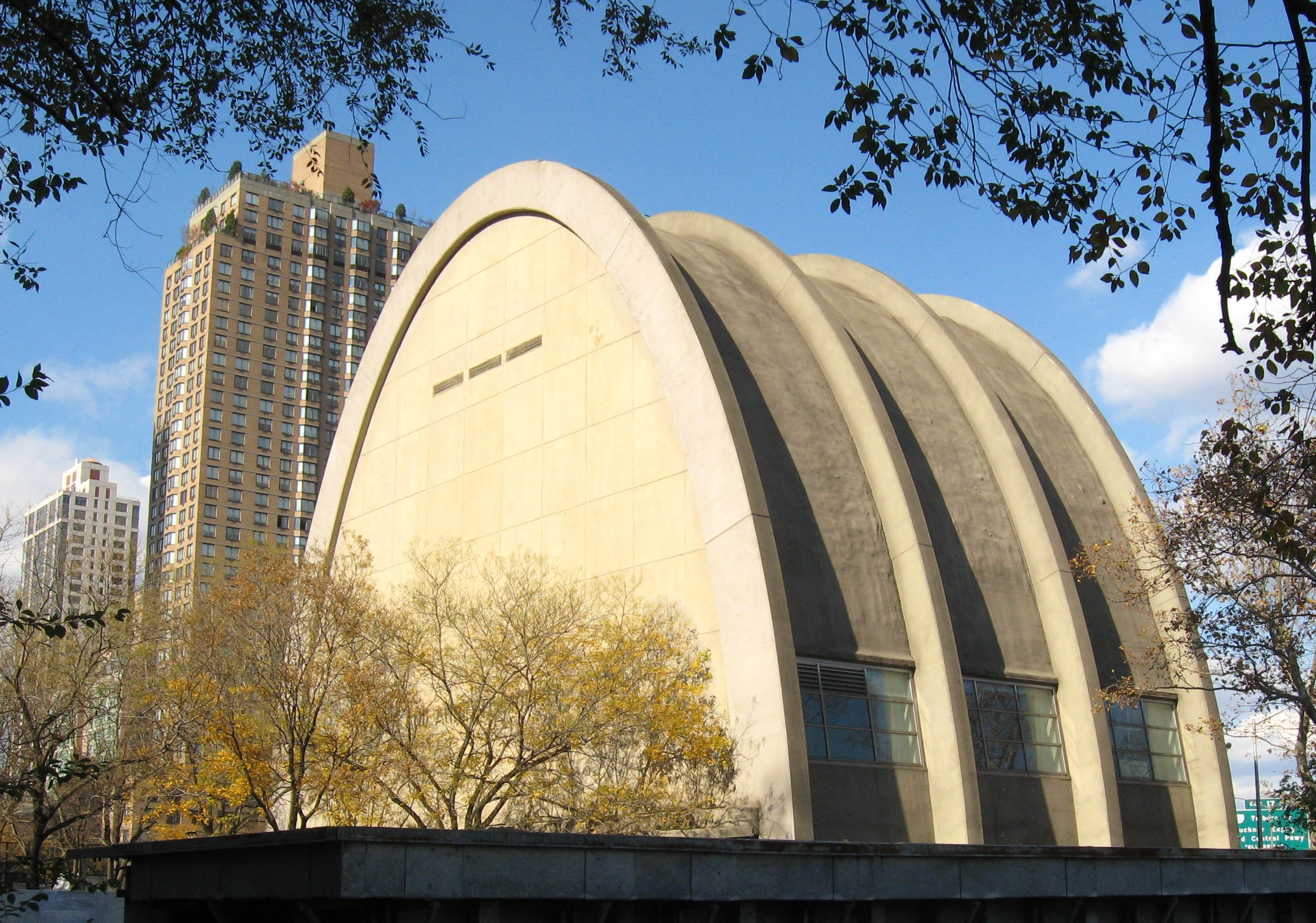
- (2008)
- Location: Between 90th and 91st Streets, Manhattan, New York
- Coordinates: 40°46′41.6″N 73°56′36.4″W
- Area: less than one acre
- Built: 1941
- Architects: Ely Jacques Kahn & Robert Allan Jacobs
- Architectural style: Postmodernist
- NRHP reference No.: 80002702
- NYSRHP No.: 06101.001802
- NYCL No.: 0905

Significant dates
- Added to NRHP: May 23, 1980
- Designated NYSRHP: June 23, 1980
- Designated NYCL: January 27, 1976

The Municipal Asphalt Plant is a former asphalt plant at York Avenue and 91st Street on the Upper East Side of Manhattan in New York City, housing the Asphalt Green recreation center. The asphalt plant was completed in 1944 to designs by Ely Jacques Kahn and Robert Allan Jacobs. The current structure, originally a mixing plant, reopened as the George and Annette Murphy Center in 1984. The asphalt plant, which formerly included a conveyor belt and storage facility, produced asphalt that was used to pave roads in Manhattan. The Murphy Center is a New York City designated landmark and is listed on the National Register of Historic Places.

The Municipal Asphalt Plant's post-modernist design was intended to fit the residential character of the surrounding neighborhood while also being industrial. The mixing plant was the first parabolic-arched building in the United States to use reinforced concrete. The exterior was designed with four arched ribs, while the walls and roof are made of cast-in-place concrete panels, which were poured around metal ribs. The conveyor belt and storage building were originally also made of reinforced concrete. The modern-day recreation center consists of the George and Annette Murphy Center, the AquaCenter swimming complex, an outdoor field, and a former fireboat pier.

An asphalt plant had existed on the Upper East Side of Manhattan, along the East River near 91st Street, since May 1914. Manhattan borough president Stanley M. Isaacs announced plans for a three-level asphalt and sanitation plant on the site in 1939, and Kahn and Jacobs's plans were announced the next year. Work on the Municipal Asphalt Plant began in 1941, and the plant was dedicated on May 24, 1944. After the plant closed in 1968, the conveyor belt and storage facility were demolished. The New York City government announced plans to redevelop the site in 1971, but neighborhood residents heavily opposed the plan, establishing Asphalt Green on the site in 1973. A restoration of the mixing plant was announced in 1979 and completed in 1984. The recreation center has undergone various upgrades over the years, and a swimming center next to the Murphy Center was constructed in the early 1990s.

== Architecture ==
The Municipal Asphalt Plant is on the east side of York Avenue, north of 91st Street, on the Upper East Side of Manhattan in New York City. It was designed by Ely Jacques Kahn and Robert Allan Jacobs and built between 1941 and 1944 for Stanley M. Isaacs, the Manhattan borough president of the time. Built under the supervision of public works commissioner Walker D. Binger, the plant was one of the first projects designed by the firm of Kahn and Jacobs. Syska and Hennessy were hired as consulting engineers for the project, while Kahn and Jacobs collaborated with engineer Shamoon Nadir in the design of the building. Jacobs took credit for the plant's concrete arches, claiming that he had devised this concept while studying under Le Corbusier in France. Although the plant diverged considerably from Kahn's earlier designs, he influenced other aspects of the building, such as the use of cast-in-place concrete and prefabricated materials.

The Municipal Asphalt Plant is designed in the post-modernist style. According to the New York City Landmarks Preservation Commission (LPC), Isaacs wished for an "architectural treatment that would blend harmoniously with" both the nearby residential buildings and the neighboring East River (now FDR) Drive on the East River. The current building was originally the mixing plant, one of three structures in the asphalt plant. It was attached to a rectangular storage facility for the raw materials that trucks had brought in, as well as a conveyor belt that brought the raw materials to the mixing plant.

=== Form and facade ===
The mixing plant was the first parabolic-arched building in the United States to use reinforced concrete, a cheaper alternative to steel that had been experimented with in Europe, but not used to any great effect. The arches were more efficient than the more-conventional form of a rectangle, and they further reduced stresses and the need for extraneous reinforced steel. The interior of the plant was designed first, followed by the exterior. The structure consists of four arched ribs, each measuring 90 feet (27 m) wide and 84.5 feet (25.8 m) high; the centers of the ribs are 22 feet (6.7 m) apart. These ribs support a barrel-vaulted ceiling made of concrete. Between the ribs, the sides of the plant have sash windows about one-third of the way up the walls. A sundial sculpture by Robert Adzema was installed outside the building's main entrance in 1984.

The architects initially wished to construct the arches using concrete forms, but this would have been slow and costly, and it would have required the equipment to be installed first. Instead, the construction contractors decided to use prefabricated steel ribs, each split into three sections. The walls and roof are made of cast-in-place concrete panels, which were created by pouring concrete around the ribs. This allowed the equipment to be installed after the complex was completed, and it also obviated the need for complex scaffolding. Vertical beams, placed atop horizontal girders, were used to stiffen the walls on either end of the building. Originally, the roofs of the mixing plant and the conveyor belt were supposed to be made of Monel metal, but this was postponed because of material shortages during World War II. The mixing plant's metal roof was not installed while the asphalt plant was in operation; as a result, the roof began to leak when the building was converted to a recreation center.

=== Features ===
==== Asphalt plant ====
When the asphalt plant was in operation, river barges delivered sand and stone to a hopper above the conveyor belt. The conveyor belt carried materials from the East River shoreline under FDR Drive, then traveled diagonally above ground to the storage facility. The raw materials were then transferred to a secondary belt inside the storage facility. Windows were installed at "strategic points of distribution and processing" in each structure. The storage building included large containers for storing raw materials, as well as catwalks and conveyor belts on an upper level, which were illuminated by ribbon windows. Limestone dust was pumped directly to the storage building, while asphalt cement was piped to the storage building.

Afterward, dry materials and liquid asphalt cement were mixed in the mixing plant and transported to paving trucks. The mixing plant contained three sets of asphalt-mixing machines, one between each set of ribs. The space was electrically heated to prevent congelation of liquid asphalt, and it had automatic mixing controls, an automated thermostat, and equipment to collect dust, The plant was capable of creating 120 tons of asphalt concrete per hour, which could be increased to 160 tons per hour during peak times. When it opened, the plant was capable of producing 700 tons of asphalt concrete per day, compared to the 450-ton capacity of the plant that it replaced. At its peak, the plant could produce 900 tons of asphalt concrete per day, which was used for paving roads in Manhattan.

==== Recreation center ====
The modern Asphalt Green complex covers 5.5 acres (2.2 ha), stretching between 92nd Street to the north, FDR Drive to the northeast, 90th Street to the south, and York Avenue to the west. The mixing plant was converted into the four-story George and Annette Murphy Center in the early 1980s. Originally, the building was supposed to be a three-story structure; the ground floor was to include offices, storage rooms, locker rooms, and an assembly room and theater. The second floor was to include physical-education space and an art studio, while the third story was to include a multipurpose space that could be used as an auditorium or a gymnasium. In the final plans, four levels were added to the Murphy Center, rather than three. The lowest three stories had low ceilings, while the top floor contained a gym with a suspended running track. The space included two gymnasiums, art studios, and a 91-seat theater known as the Paul Mazur Theater.

North of the Murphy Center is the AquaCenter, a three-story swimming complex designed in a similar style to the Murphy Center. The AquaCenter's main swimming pool measures 170 by 60 feet (52 by 18 m) across and up to 16 feet (4.9 m) deep; part of the pool's floor can be moved hydraulically to accommodate disabled guests. The main pool is covered by a curved skylight. Next to the main pool is a 7-foot-deep (2.1 m) exercise pool whose entire floor can be moved hydraulically. There is also a pool for swimming lessons, measuring 18 by 26 feet (5.5 by 7.9 m), as well as a set of bleachers that can accommodate up to 700 people. The aquatic center was also planned with offices for Asphalt Green officials, as well as a center for sports medicine and physical therapy. The top floor contains a fitness center.

West of the swimming center, on York Avenue between 91st and 92nd Streets, is the DeKovats Playground. The play area is named for Hungarian military officer Michael Kovats. A truck ramp runs across the Asphalt Green complex, connecting York Avenue with a waste transfer station operated by the New York City Department of Sanitation (DSNY).

== History ==
An asphalt plant had existed on the Upper East Side of Manhattan, along the East River near 91st Street, since March 1914. Described by the New-York Tribune as the "largest municipal asphalt plant in the world", it could produce enough asphalt to pave 3,500 square yards (2,900 m^{2}) per day. The site was roughly equidistant from the northernmost and southernmost points of Manhattan, reducing the need for trucks to transport raw materials, and its waterfront location allowed barges to deliver raw materials easily. By the late 1930s, that asphalt plant had become outdated, and the neighborhood had evolved from a partly commercial to a largely residential area. Isaacs wished to develop a new asphalt plant in conjunction with construction on the East River Drive. Furthermore, DSNY operated an ash dump on a neighboring pier at 92nd Street, and fumes from the ash dump had caused land values in the surrounding area to decrease. Many of Manhattan's streets were paved in Belgian blocks at the time, but Isaacs wished to repave the borough's streets in asphalt, which was less expensive than Belgian blocks.

=== Use as asphalt plant ===
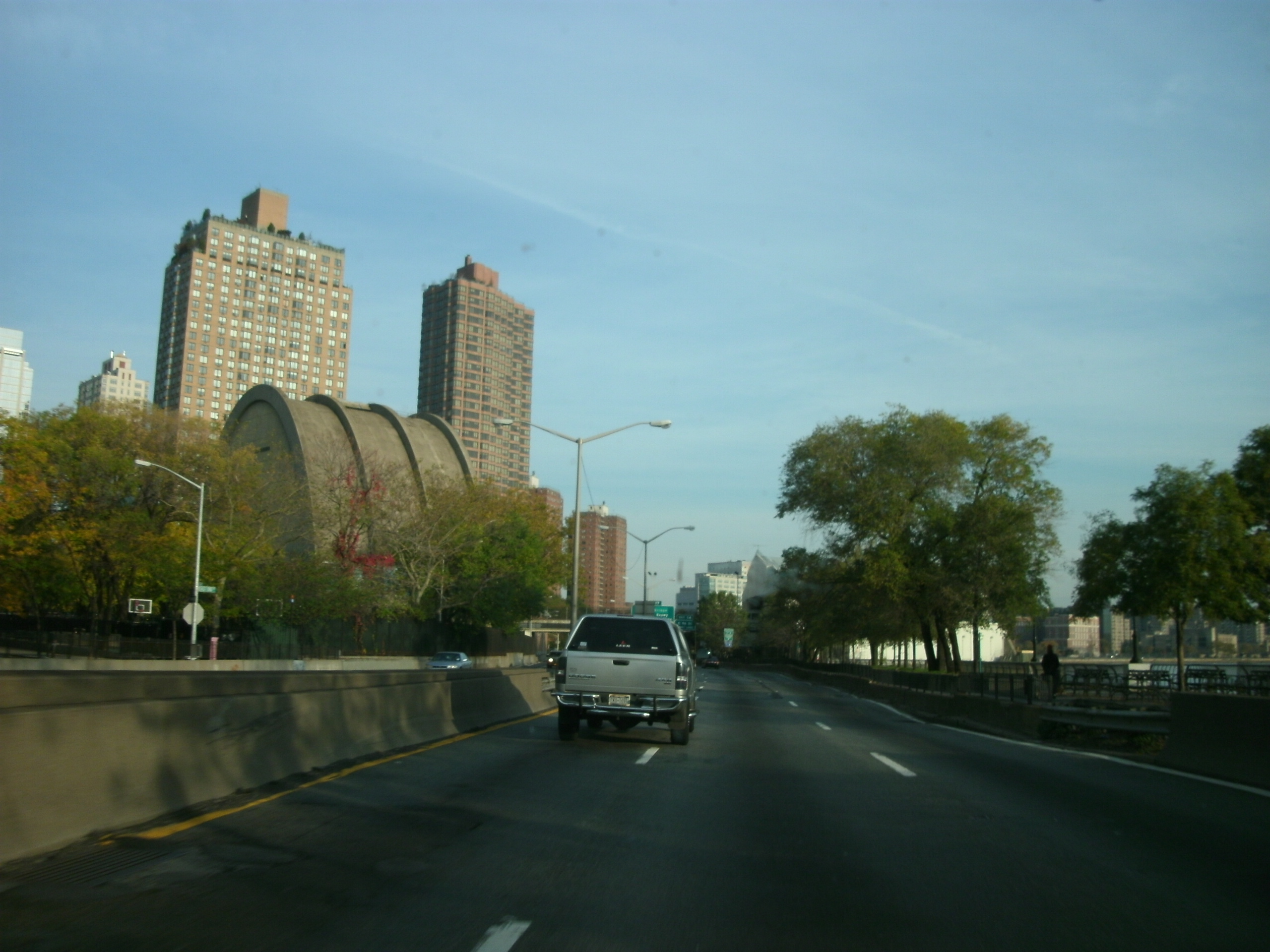
Asphalt Green (center left) as seen from the northbound FDR Drive

In mid-1939, Isaacs announced plans to build a three-level asphalt and sanitation plant on the East River near 90th Street. That November, Isaacs announced plans to add an enclosed sanitation facility for DSNY on the neighboring pier. (Note: The marine transfer station on that site operated from 1940 to 1999.) The same month, Isaacs submitted a plan to the Public Works Administration (PWA), requesting funding for the DSNY facility, a tunnel connecting with the East River asphalt plant, and numerous other improvements along the East River Drive. The tunnel was completed by mid-1940; at the time, the Manhattan borough president's office had also installed pipes for asphalt concrete, as well as conveyor belts for sand and stone. That July, the borough president's office announced plans for a new asphalt plant, designed by Kahn. The plan tentatively called for a concrete structure made of several large arches, similar to a bridge arch. Isaacs predicted that the new plant would further reduce pollution. The architect Hugh Ferriss created a rendering of the proposed plant.

The building was initially projected to cost $700,000. The New York City government approved a construction contract for the new plant on March 13, 1941. The initial bids to build it were higher than expected, so the government revised the plans to reduce costs. A revised contract was approved on March 27, 1941, at which point the plant was to cost $900,000. New York City mayor Fiorello La Guardia dedicated a plaque at the new asphalt plant in October 1941. The New York City Planning Commission approved the installation of dust-elimination equipment in May 1944, just before the plant opened, at a cost of $97,000. The existing equipment already removed 85 percent of dust, but the remaining dust often drifted over the East River and into the nearby Gracie Mansion, the New York City mayor's residence. The Municipal Asphalt Plant was dedicated on May 24, 1944. Despite initial concerns that local residents would object to the asphalt plant, an apartment building had been developed nearby after construction of the asphalt plant had commenced.

The plant produced about 27,000 tons of asphalt in 1945, its first full year of operation, and it was making 50,000 tons by 1948. During this four-year period, the plant produced 150,000 tons of asphalt in total. The plant supplied all of the asphalt used to repave roads in Manhattan; between 1945 and 1948, over 80 percent of repaving projects in Manhattan used asphalt. A one-story asphalt plant at 90th Street opened in December 1953, and the conveyor belt under FDR Drive was repaired in 1963. City highway commissioner Harry J. Donnelly awarded a $14,200 contract for the installation of new dust-removing equipment in 1966; the new equipment could remove 90 percent of the plant's dust emissions. At that point, Donnelly said the plant was "one of the air-polluting offenders of Manhattan's East Side".

=== Closure and redevelopment plans ===
In 1968, the New York City government constructed a new asphalt plant in Queens, serving all five of the city's boroughs, and the separate asphalt plants in each borough were closed. The Manhattan asphalt plant's storage facility and conveyor were torn down. However, the mixing plant was so sturdy that the walls remained standing after three weeks of attempts to demolish it. By 1969, there were plans to redevelop the site with an 830-seat school and 1,000 apartments for middle-class residents. The school on the Municipal Asphalt Plant's site would be the first of four new schools in the Yorkville neighborhood. The new development would temporarily house displaced families who were being displaced from the other three sites. The Educational Construction Fund, a nonprofit organization established by the New York State Legislature, was in charge of the project. The New York City government announced in September 1971 that it would convert the mixing plant into a gymnasium and cafeteria for the new development. The gym and cafeteria were to be shared by a 640-seat elementary school and a 230-seat special education school.

Further details of the $50 million project were announced in December 1971. The 5-acre (2.0 ha) site would have contained 200 low-income, 300 moderate-income, and 700 middle-income apartments, spread across three towers of 20, 41, and 46 stories. Opponents of the plan formed the Neighborhood Committee of the Asphalt Project, led by local doctor George Murphy, in April 1972. The Neighborhood Committee said the neighborhood lacked recreational areas and that several local schools were under-enrolled. The committee did not object to the low-income component of the project, but it asked the city to build a recreational facility on the site of the middle-income towers. The Neighborhood Committee asked the New York City Board of Estimate to rezone the site for recreational use, soliciting the support of 80 percent of nearby buildings' owners. Murphy and his wife Annette circulated a petition to rezone the site, and they organized large groups, which advocated for a recreation center at Planning Commission hearings.

Despite opposition to the redevelopment project, the Planning Commission approved plans in October 1972. Several hundred opponents held a protest outside New York City Hall in November 1972, and the Board of Estimate narrowly vetoed the original plan for the site that December. The next year, the fund proposed a revised plan with 671 luxury apartments, 288 affordable housing units, and an elementary school for 875 students. The Neighborhood Committee of the Asphalt Project put forth an alternate plan that excluded the luxury units. Local politicians almost unanimously supported the redevelopment project, except for then-City Council president Sanford Garelik, who endorsed the committee's alternate proposal. In March 1974, the city allocated an additional $1.5 million to the redevelopment project. Due to continued opposition from residents, the Educational Construction Fund officially canceled plans for the Municipal Asphalt Plant development in August 1974.

=== Conversion to recreation center ===
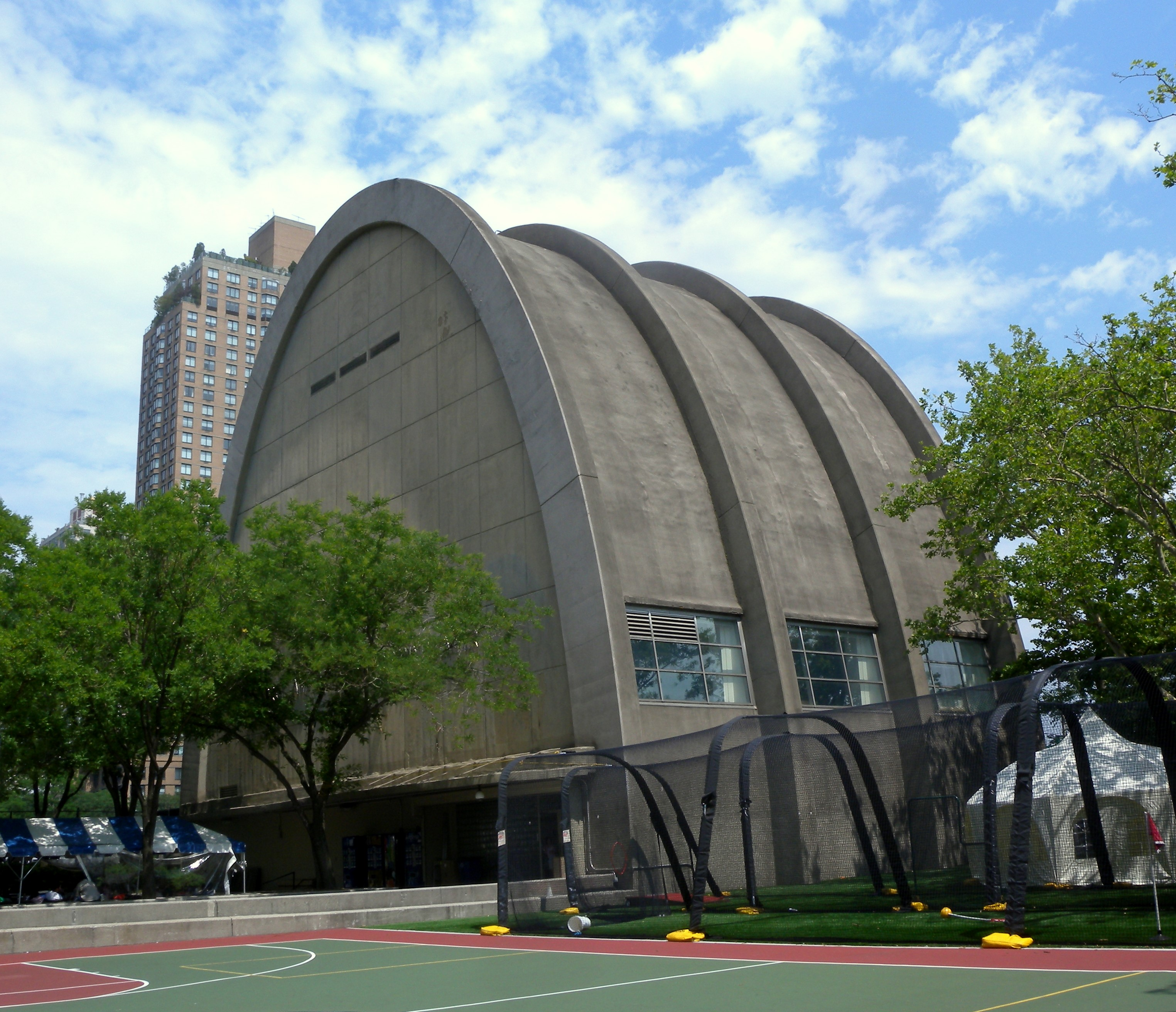
View of the former mixing plant (now the Murphy Center) from the south

In the 1970s, the city government constructed a temporary recreation field and two basketball courts outside the mixing plant; the recreation complex became known as Asphalt Green. Work on the 120-yard-long (110 m) turf field began in May 1973, and the field was completed that September. At the time, it was described as the East Side's only recreation field between 15th and 112th Streets. (Note: It has also been described as the only field on Manhattan's East Side between 10th and 112th Streets) Asphalt Green was funded by $15,000 from the Heckscher Foundation, $20,000 from local residents, and $60,000 from the Vincent Astor Foundation. In addition, Lederle Laboratories donated 4,000 cubic feet (110 m^{3}) of land fill. Asphalt Green hosted 32 school groups and 70 other groups in 1974, its first full year of operation. During the complex's first two years, it hosted 35 American football teams and 145 basketball teams. Prior to the cancellation of the Asphalt Plant redevelopment, about 26,000 local residents signed petitions in early 1974, advocating for Asphalt Green to be preserved.

==== Initial renovation ====
After Asphalt Green opened, the Heckscher and Vincent Astor foundations continued to fund the recreation center, and other organizations also provided monetary support. These funds allowed Asphalt Green to hire a full-time park supervisor, but the city government still had not provided any funds for the site. After Chase Manhattan Bank gave Asphalt Green a $3,000 grant in September 1975, supporters held a fundraiser for a further renovation of the site. Architectural firm HOK (the successor to Kahn and Jacobs), in collaboration with Giovanni Pasanella and Arvid Klein, were hired to design the renovation. In early 1976, the Samuel H. Kress Foundation offered a $50,000 matching grant for the proposed renovation of the mixing plant, which was still structurally sound but had degraded over time. By then, local politicians unanimously supported the planned renovation. The city government gave the asphalt plant's site to Asphalt Green's operators in 1976.

The Manufacturers Hanover Corporation and Exxon collectively donated a further $40,000 for the mixing plant's renovation in 1977. As part of the project, Asphalt Green's operators had acquired a fireboat pier on 90th Street the same year; the fireboat pier had housed the New York City Fire Department's Marine Division 5 until 1976. Asphalt Green planned to use the pier, along with a nearby unoccupied island known as Mill Rock, for environmental studies. The pier was rebuilt in 1978 but was subsequently struck by a passing boat, then further damaged by arson; it ultimately reopened in 1979 as a marine-studies center. City officials announced plans in May 1979 to convert the former mixing plant into a community center with a gymnasium, theater, and other facilities. The city government contributed $1.6 million in Federal Community Development Funds from the U.S. Department of Housing and Urban Development, and the local community raised $800,000. The New York State Energy Research and Development Authority (NYSERDA) and Asphalt Green also announced that they would renovate the fireboat pier, providing renewable energy for both the mixing plant and the pier. A wind turbine on Mill Rock, solar panels on the pier, and a cogeneration plant was to provide much of the mixing plant's electricity.

In 1980, Asphalt Green received $92,000 from the NYSERDA and $82,000 from the Vincent Astor Foundation to fund the establishment of an educational center devoted to energy conservation. The energy-conservation center opened in May 1981, providing wind and solar power for both the pier and the former mixing plant. At the time, the renovation of the mixing plant was slated to begin later that year. The Neighborhood Committee had raised $1 million from foundations and $300,000 from local residents, but the committee needed to raise another $300,000. The remaining cost was ultimately funded by two developers, who agreed to collectively donate $1.1 million for improvements to the Upper East Side. Glenwood Management, which was constructing two buildings directly across York Avenue, agreed to give Asphalt Green $325,000 in exchange for a 20 percent floor area bonus for both buildings. The complex reopened in October 1984 after a $3 million renovation. The mixing plant was renamed in honor of George Murphy and his wife Annette.

==== Later modifications ====
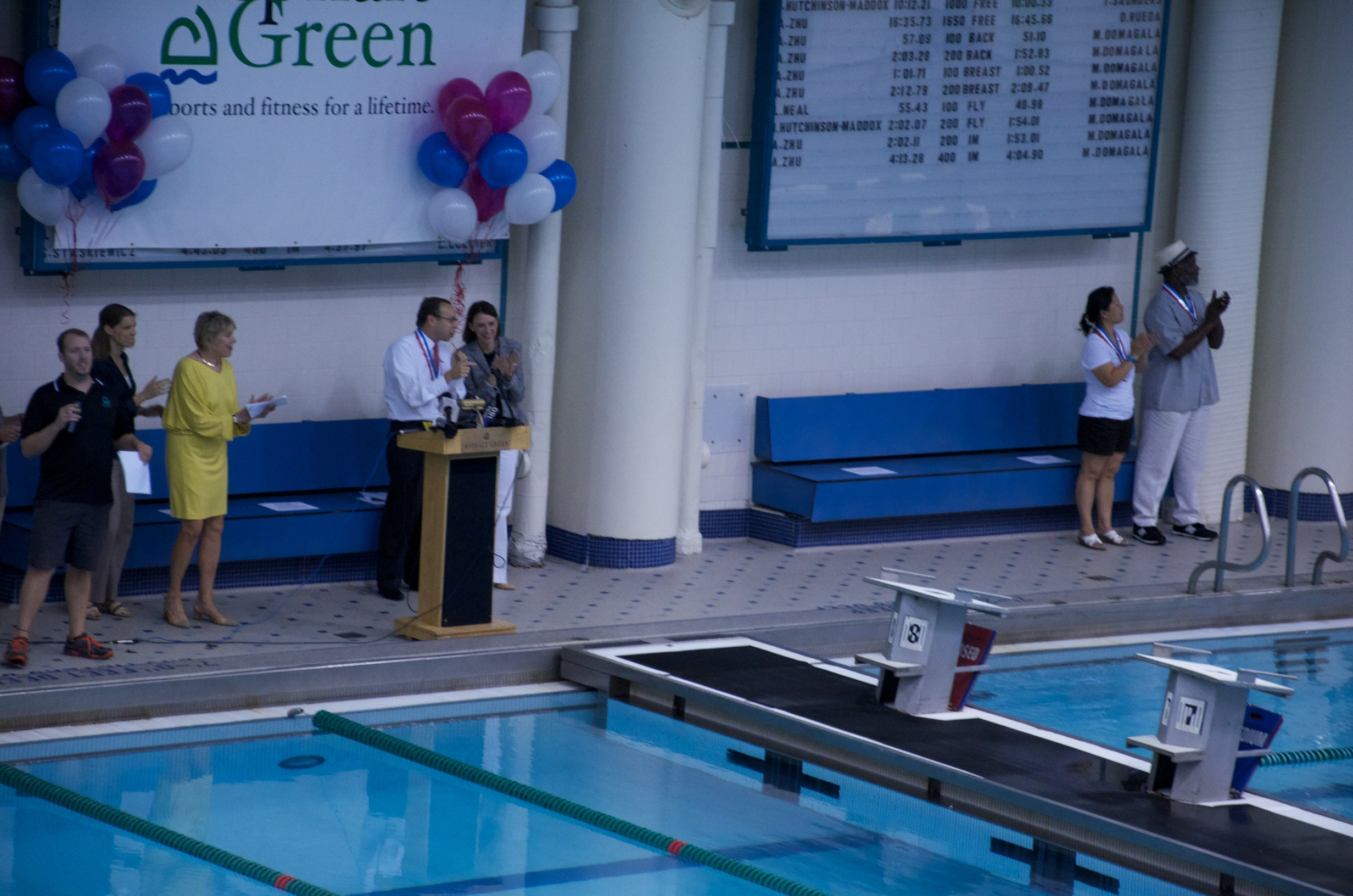
One of Asphalt Green's swimming pools, seen in 2012

The New York City Department of Parks and Recreation formally licensed Asphalt Green's operators to use Mill Rock in early 1986. By then, the temporary outdoor field had begun to deteriorate, having been in near-constant use for 11 years. As a result, the Neighborhood Committee received a $600,000 city grant and raised $900,000 to fund the restoration of the field. A new AstroTurf field, replacing the original sod field, was completed that July at a cost of $1.5 million. Murphy was planning to add an aquatic center with an Olympic-size swimming pool; at the time, New York City had no Olympic-size indoor swimming pools, leading him to say that "the greatest city in the world doesn't have the pools for [Olympic athletes] to train". Murphy planned to construct a three-story building with a 50-metre (160 ft) main pool and two smaller pools for rehabilitation or lessons. At that time, Asphalt Green hosted after-school programs, theatrical performances, and a social club.

The Board of Estimate gave Asphalt Green a $4 million grant in August 1990 to help fund the swimming center's construction. As a condition for receiving the grant, Asphalt Green had to allow free or reduced-free access to its facilities 30 percent of the time. Construction of the swimming center began in October 1991. The project was expected to cost $20 million in total, of which local residents had raised $12 million, in addition to the city's $4 million grant. The architect Richard Dattner was hired to design the swimming center, known as the AquaCenter. A wading pool, handball courts, and play equipment were removed to make way for the new swimming center. The pool was completed in June 1993, while the gym facilities opened that October. The project ultimately cost $24 million, of which $6 million came from Albert and Barrie Zesiger, respectively the recreation center's chairman and vice chairman. The aquatic center served 3,000 patrons per week by 1994.

The Murphy Center's roof had deteriorated by the late 1990s due to water damage. The State Division for Youth gave a $190,000 grant to fund repairs to the roof, although Asphalt Green officials estimated that a full roof replacement would cost $1.2 million. Asphalt Green's operators built a temporary outdoor swimming pool in 2006, while the main swimming pool underwent repairs; the outdoor swimming pool necessitated the closure of two popular basketball courts. Although the main pool reopened in 2007, the outdoor pool remained in place for over a year. The complex also continued to host other sports such as football, soccer, softball, and baseball, as well as programs such as martial arts, Pilates, and yoga. The complex gave free swimming lessons to 5,000 students a year by the early 2010s; among its students was 2012 Olympic medalist Lia Neal.

Meanwhile, the neighboring DSNY waste transfer station had closed in 1999 and city officials proposed reopening it in 2006, though local residents opposed this plan for several years. The reopening proceeded and City officials announced in late 2014 that Asphalt Green would have to be closed temporarily while an access ramp to the waste transfer station, bisecting the complex at 91st Street, was built. The city government agreed to build another ramp after Asphalt Green officials and residents expressed concerns that the ramp would endanger children crossing the street. Asphalt Green replaced the Murphy Center's fourth-floor basketball courts in 2015 with a soccer field. At the end of that year, Asphalt Green officials announced plans to renovate the other three floors of the Murphy Center for $2.2 million. The filters in the main swimming pool were replaced in 2017 for $700,000. The outdoor field was renamed Litwin Field in 2019 after Glenwood Management chief executive Leonard Litwin, a longtime donor to Asphalt Green.

== Impact ==
=== Critical reception ===
Robert Moses, New York City's parks commissioner at the time of the asphalt plant's completion in 1944, had a negative view of what he dubbed the "Cathedral of Asphalt", deriding it as a "freakish experiment". In a 1943 op-ed for The New York Times, Moses described the plant as one instance of the "horrible modernistic stuff" being built around New York City. In a 1947 article for The Washington Post, Moses called the Municipal Asphalt Plant and the neighboring ash plant "two of the most hideous water-front structures ever inflicted on a city by a combination of architectural conceit and official bad taste". Moses's comments prompted Binger to defend the design in a New York Times article.

The Museum of Modern Art (MoMA) displayed a model of the Municipal Asphalt Plant in a 1944 exhibit, "Art in Progress", which showcased 47 buildings that MoMA's staff considered "outstanding examples of good design". MoMA curator Elizabeth Bauer Mock lauded the plant, saying that it created an "exciting experience for motorists on the adjacent super-highway". MoMA also defended the plant in Built in U.S.A., 1932-1944, a book that accompanied the exhibition. The March 1944 issue of Architectural Forum wrote, "Certainly the contrast of cube and ellipse offered by the two main buildings is a radical departure from the conventional brick fortification style of older industrial buildings, but this novel form is fully justified by the functions and machinery it encloses." Architectural Forum attributed the building's "chopped off and incomplete" appearance to the fact that, at the time of the plant's completion, concrete arches had only been used for structures such as drill halls, auditoriums, and hangars.

After the 1980s renovation, Paul Goldberger of the Times said that renovation architects HOK and Pasanella + Klein "did all they could to preserve the essence of this great industrial building". Another Times writer said the Murphy Center "looks somewhat like a huge half-buried sardine can". When Jacobs died in 1993, Richard D. Lyons of the Times described the Municipal Asphalt Plant as "perhaps the [Kahn and Jacobs] firm's most notable structure" and said that, aside from Moses's commentary, architects generally had positive impressions of the building's design. Ralph Gardner Jr. of The Wall Street Journal wrote in 2011 that, after the Municipal Asphalt Plant was converted into Asphalt Green, it had "become singularly successful, something of a town square, its facilities attracting everyone from children arriving for swimming lessons to the elderly."

=== Landmark designations ===
The New York City Landmarks Preservation Commission (LPC) designated the mixing plant as a New York City landmark in January 1976; for several years, it was the youngest building in New York City to be designated as a landmark. At the time, Goldberger wrote that the mixing plant was a "crucial modern monument in the city" and that "it has been doing unofficial landmark duty for a long time". Conversely, some critics of the LPC questioned whether the mixing plant was even worthy of landmark status. Kent Barwick of the LPC said that, by giving landmark status to such structures as the Municipal Asphalt Plant, sidewalk clocks, and the interiors of several New York City Subway stations, the LPC was "getting closer to [...] a complete package" with regards to the types of structures that received landmark status. The mixing plant was also placed on the National Register of Historic Places in 1980.

== Management ==
Asphalt Green Inc., a 501(c)(3) nonprofit organization, operates the former Municipal Asphalt Plant. George Murphy founded the organization in 1975, while he was advocating to convert the plant into a recreation center. Asphalt Green operates the recreation center in partnership with the New York City Department of Parks and Recreation and the New York City Council. The organization operates youth and adult sports programs, one-third of which are free to the public. Asphalt Green opened a second recreation center in Battery Park City in 2013; the Battery Park City facility contains a swimming pool, gymnasium, fitness center, and outdoor fields.

== See also ==
- National Register of Historic Places listings in Manhattan from 59th to 110th Streets
- List of New York City Designated Landmarks in Manhattan from 59th to 110th Streets
