= Seagram Building =

Office skyscraper in Manhattan, New York

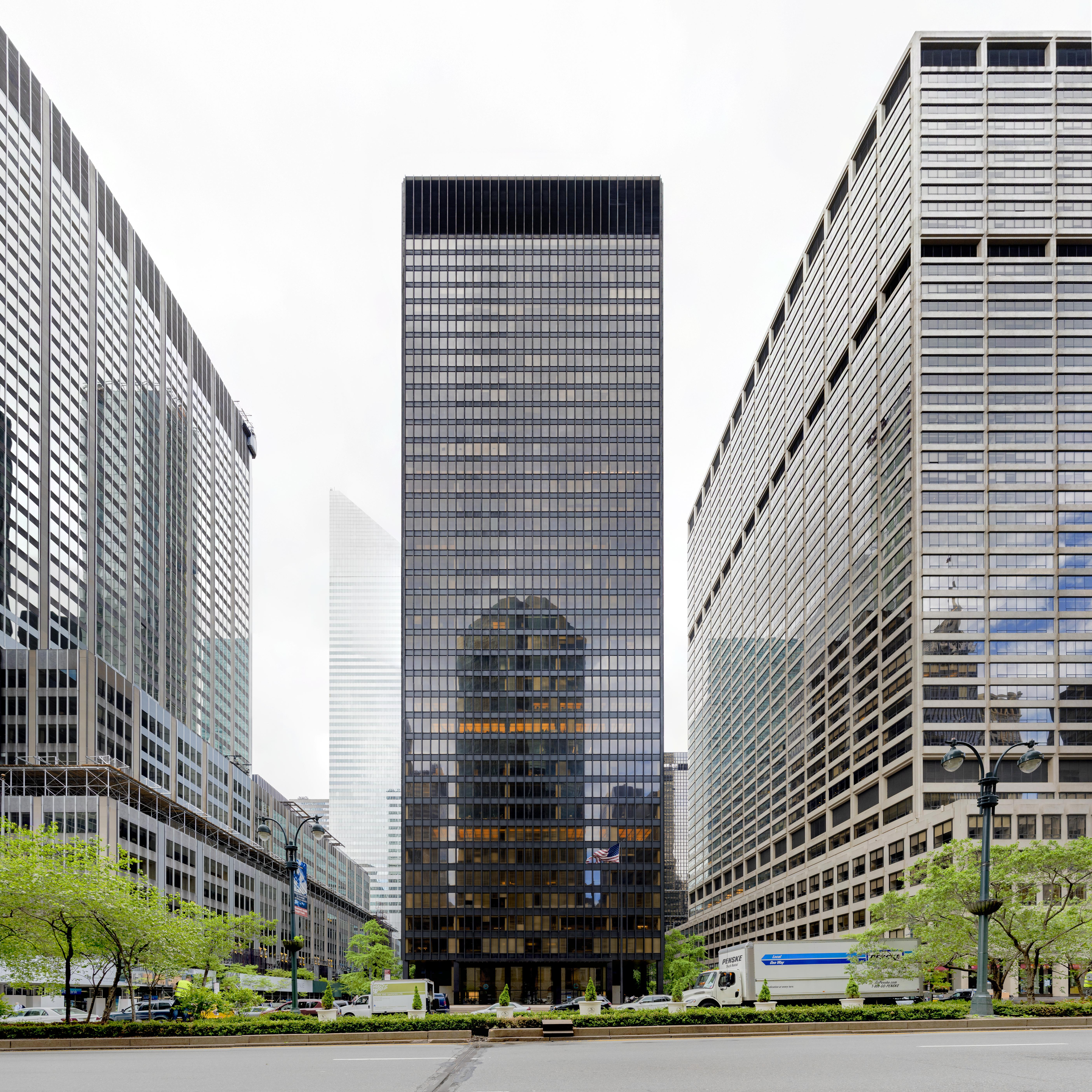
- The Seagram Building as viewed from across Park Avenue
- Interactive map of the Seagram Building area

General information
- Type: Office
- Architectural style: International Style
- Location: 375 Park Avenue; Manhattan, New York 10152; U.S.
- Coordinates: 40°45′31″N 73°58′20″W
- Completed: 1958; 68 years ago
- Opened: May 22, 1958; 68 years ago
- Owner: Aby Rosen

Height
- Roof: 516 ft (157 m)
- Top floor: 465 ft (142 m)

Technical details
- Floor count: 38
- Floor area: 849,014 ft^{2} (78,876.0 m^{2})

Design and construction
- Architects: Ludwig Mies van der Rohe; Philip Johnson
- Engineer: Jaros, Baum & Bolles (MEP)
- Structural engineer: Severud Associates

Website
- seagram375park.com

U.S. National Register of Historic Places
- Designated: February 24, 2006
- Reference no.: 06000056

New York State Register of Historic Places
- Designated: December 14, 2005
- Reference no.: 06101.010696

New York City Landmark
- Designated: October 3, 1989
- Reference no.: 1664
- Designated entity: Facade

New York City Landmark
- Designated: October 3, 1989
- Reference no.: 1665
- Designated entity: Interior: Lobby

New York City Landmark
- Designated: October 3, 1989
- Reference no.: 1666
- Designated entity: Interior: Four Seasons Restaurant

The Seagram Building is a skyscraper at 375 Park Avenue, between 52nd and 53rd streets, in the Midtown Manhattan neighborhood of New York City, New York, United States. It was designed in the International Style by Ludwig Mies van der Rohe along with Philip Johnson, Ely Jacques Kahn, and Robert Allan Jacobs. The high-rise tower is 515 feet (157 m) tall with 38 stories and, when completed in 1958, initially served as the headquarters of the Seagram Company, a Canadian distiller.

Phyllis Lambert, daughter of Seagram CEO Samuel Bronfman, heavily influenced the Seagram Building's design, an example of the functionalist aesthetic and a prominent instance of corporate modern architecture. A glass curtain wall with vertical mullions of bronze and horizontal spandrels made of Muntz metal form the building's exterior. On Park Avenue is a pink-granite public plaza with two fountains. Behind the plaza is a tall elevator lobby with a similar design to the plaza. The lowest stories originally contained the Four Seasons Restaurant, which was replaced in 2017 with the Grill and Pool restaurants, and the Brasserie restaurant, which was superseded in 1995 by the Lobster Club. On the upper stories are modular office spaces.

Seagram revealed plans for the building in July 1954, when it announced construction of its headquarters on the up-and-coming commercial strip of Park Avenue. After Lambert objected to Pereira & Luckman's original design, Mies was selected as the architect that November. The building's construction began in late 1955 and finished in 1958, although the official certificate of occupancy was not granted until 1959. The Teachers Insurance and Annuity Association of America (TIAA) purchased the building in 1979, and it remained Seagram's headquarters until 2001. TIAA sold the building in 2000 to Aby Rosen's RFR Holding LLC, which still owned the structure as of 2025.

Upon opening, the Seagram Building was widely praised for its architecture. Described in The New York Times as one of "New York's most copied buildings", the Seagram Building has inspired the designs of other structures around the world. Within New York City, the Seagram Building helped influence the 1961 Zoning Resolution, a zoning ordinance that allowed developers to construct additional floor area in exchange for including plazas outside their buildings. In 1989, the New York City Landmarks Preservation Commission designated the Seagram Building's exterior, lobby, and The Four Seasons Restaurant as official city landmarks. The building was added to the National Register of Historic Places in 2006.

== Site ==
The Seagram Building is at 375 Park Avenue, on the east side of the avenue between 52nd and 53rd streets, in the Midtown Manhattan neighborhood of New York City, New York, United States. The building was never officially named for its original anchor tenant, Canadian conglomerate Seagram, and is legally known only by its address. The building is assigned its own ZIP Code, 10152; it was one of 41 buildings in Manhattan that had their own ZIP Codes as of 2019. The land lot has a frontage of 295 feet (90 m) on 52nd Street to the south, 200 feet (61 m) on Park Avenue to the west, and 302 feet (92 m) on 53rd Street to the north. The site slopes down to the east, descending about 8 feet (2.4 m) from west to east.

The 53rd Street side contains an alley about 7 feet (2.1 m) wide, facing 100 East 53rd Street; the alley allows the Seagram Building to remain symmetrical despite the site's irregular shape. Other nearby buildings include 345 Park Avenue across 52nd Street to the south; 399 Park Avenue across 53rd Street to the north; Lever House diagonally across Park Avenue and 53rd Street; and the Racquet and Tennis Club Building and Park Avenue Plaza across Park Avenue to the west. In addition, 599 Lexington Avenue and the Citigroup Center, as well as the New York City Subway's Lexington Avenue/51st Street station (served by the 6, <6>, E, F, and <F> trains), are on Lexington Avenue less than one block to the east.

During the late 19th century, the Seagram Building's site had included the original Steinway & Sons piano factory, as well as tenements made of brick or brownstone. The Park Avenue railroad line had run in an open cut in the middle of Park Avenue until the 1900s. The construction of Grand Central Terminal in the early 20th century covered the line, spurring development in the surrounding area, known as Terminal City. The adjacent stretch of Park Avenue became a wealthy neighborhood with upscale apartments, including the Montana Apartments, built in 1914 on the site of the piano factory. Largely commercial International Style skyscrapers replaced many of the residential structures on Park Avenue during the 1950s and 1960s. These skyscrapers included the Seagram Building, Lever House, the Union Carbide Building, and the Pepsi-Cola Building. Many of these structures either had setbacks, like many of the city's early-20th-century skyscrapers, or were built as glassy rectangular slabs with few decorations. When the Seagram site was assembled in the early 1950s, it contained the Montana Apartments and four smaller row houses and apartment buildings.

== Architecture ==
German-American architect Ludwig Mies van der Rohe designed the Seagram Building in the International Style. Philip Johnson was the co-architect, being responsible for the entrance canopies, elevators, lighting, and restaurant spaces. The partnership of Ely Jacques Kahn and Robert Allan Jacobs were the associate architects. Numerous consultants were involved in the building's design, including mechanical engineers Jaros, Baum & Bolles; structural engineers Severud-Elstad Krueger; electrical engineer Clifton E. Smith; lighting consultant Richard Kelly; acoustics consultant Bolt Beranek and Newman; graphics consultant Elaine Lustig; and landscape architects Charles Middeleer and Karl Linn.

Phyllis Lambert—a Bronfman family member and the daughter of Seagram CEO Samuel Bronfman, whose idea it was to develop the building—did not impose a budget on Mies. Lambert said the Seagram Building was supposed to "be the crowning glory of everyone's work, his own, the contractor's, and Mies's". The architects used new or redesigned materials if they believed these innovations provided an improvement over existing products. The design used costly, high-quality materials, including bronze, travertine, and marble. The lavish interior, overseen by Johnson, was intended to complement the appearance of the facade. The Seagram Building was the first office building in the world to use extruded bronze on a facade, as well as the first New York City skyscraper with full-height plate glass windows.

=== Form ===
The Seagram Building occupies half the site and is recessed 90 feet (27 m) behind Park Avenue. (Note: The New York City Landmarks Preservation Commission and The New York Times state the slab is 100 feet (30 m) from Park Avenue.) The building's main section is a 38-story high-rise slab topped by a mechanical story; it does not include any setbacks. The slab is about 515 feet (157 m) tall. (Note: SkyscraperPage and Emporis cite a height of 515 feet (157 m) while Architectural Forum and the National Park Service give a height of 520 feet (160 m), while Franz Schulze cites a height of 516 feet (157 m).) As planned, the slab measured 95 by 145 feet (29 by 44 m). Along the eastern end of the slab is a narrow shaft with an emergency-exit stair, which is sometimes referred to as the "spine", rising the full height of the slab. The spine, which forms part of the building's framework, contains restrooms on the sixth to tenth floor and offices above.

There are two wings east of the main slab, facing 52nd and 53rd streets; they are variously cited as measuring four or five stories high, depending on whether the wings' at-grade basement level is counted. The central section between the wings is sometimes characterized as a "bustle" and is ten stories high. As planned, the bustle measured 90 by 85 feet (27 by 26 m) while the wings measured 90 by 200 feet (27 by 61 m). The April 1955 edition of Architectural Forum described the relative simplicity of the building's massing as "a no-setback building but a building all set back".

==== Plaza ====
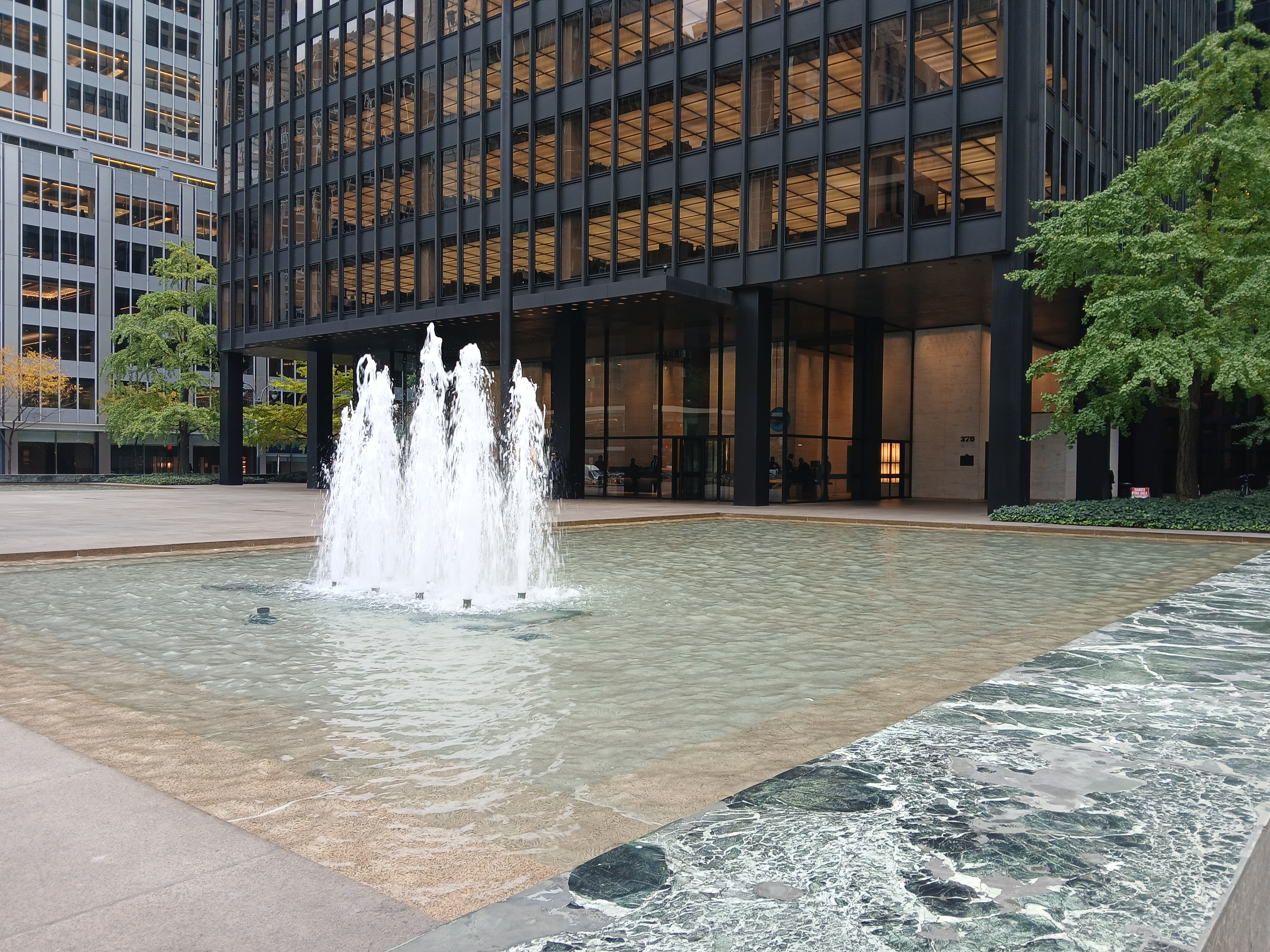
Plaza as seen from Park Avenue, looking northeast

A pink granite plaza with pools and greenery lies on the western side of the Seagram Building; it measures 90 by 150 feet (27 by 46 m) across, with the longer dimension along Park Avenue. The plaza is raised slightly above Park Avenue's sidewalk, with three steps ascending from the sidewalk midway between 52nd and 53rd streets, facing the Racquet and Tennis Club Building directly to the west. A low granite retaining wall runs on either side of the flight of steps, extending around to 52nd and 53rd streets, where they flank the building. There are marble caps atop the retaining walls on the side streets, which double as benches. At the eastern ends of the retaining walls on 52nd and 53rd streets are granite steps from street to lobby, above which are travertine canopies designed by Philip Johnson. The parapets on the side streets each measure 3.75 feet (1.14 m) wide by 180 feet (55 m) long and are made of 40 pieces of green Italian marble.

The plaza is largely symmetrical, with rectangular pools at the northwest and southwest corners. The southern pool contains a bronze flagpole, the only deviation from the design's symmetry. The water level of the pools is just below that of the plaza, and there are clusters of fountain jets at the center of both pools, which are not part of the original design. The pools measure 46 feet (14 m) wide by 70 feet (21 m) long and each contain 60,000 U.S. gallons (230,000 L; 50,000 imp gal) of water recirculated every two-and-a-half hours. Both pools are surrounded by marble banquettes, giving them a sense of seclusion. East of both pools are three planting beds with ivy and a ginkgo tree. These planting beds had contained weeping beeches before November 1959, when they were replaced with hardier ginkgo trees. The plaza contains a heating system to prevent ice buildup. At the building's completion, the plaza's surface required daily vacuuming with a sweeper.

From its construction, the plaza was intended not only as an urban green space but as a point of interest. Architecture critic Lewis Mumford said of the plaza: "In a few steps one is lifted out of the street so completely that one has almost the illusion of having climbed a long flight of stairs." In its simplicity, the plaza's design was a marked contrast to the Channel Gardens in front of 30 Rockefeller Plaza, which architectural writer Robert A. M. Stern describes as being known for its festiveness. The initial plan had been to place abstract sculptures in the plaza, but Mies abandoned this proposal. Though Stern and a National Park Service report both state that Mies could not find a sculptor he felt could produce work suited for the landscape, architectural writer Franz Schulze says that Mies had never been seriously considering adding these sculptures.

=== Facade ===
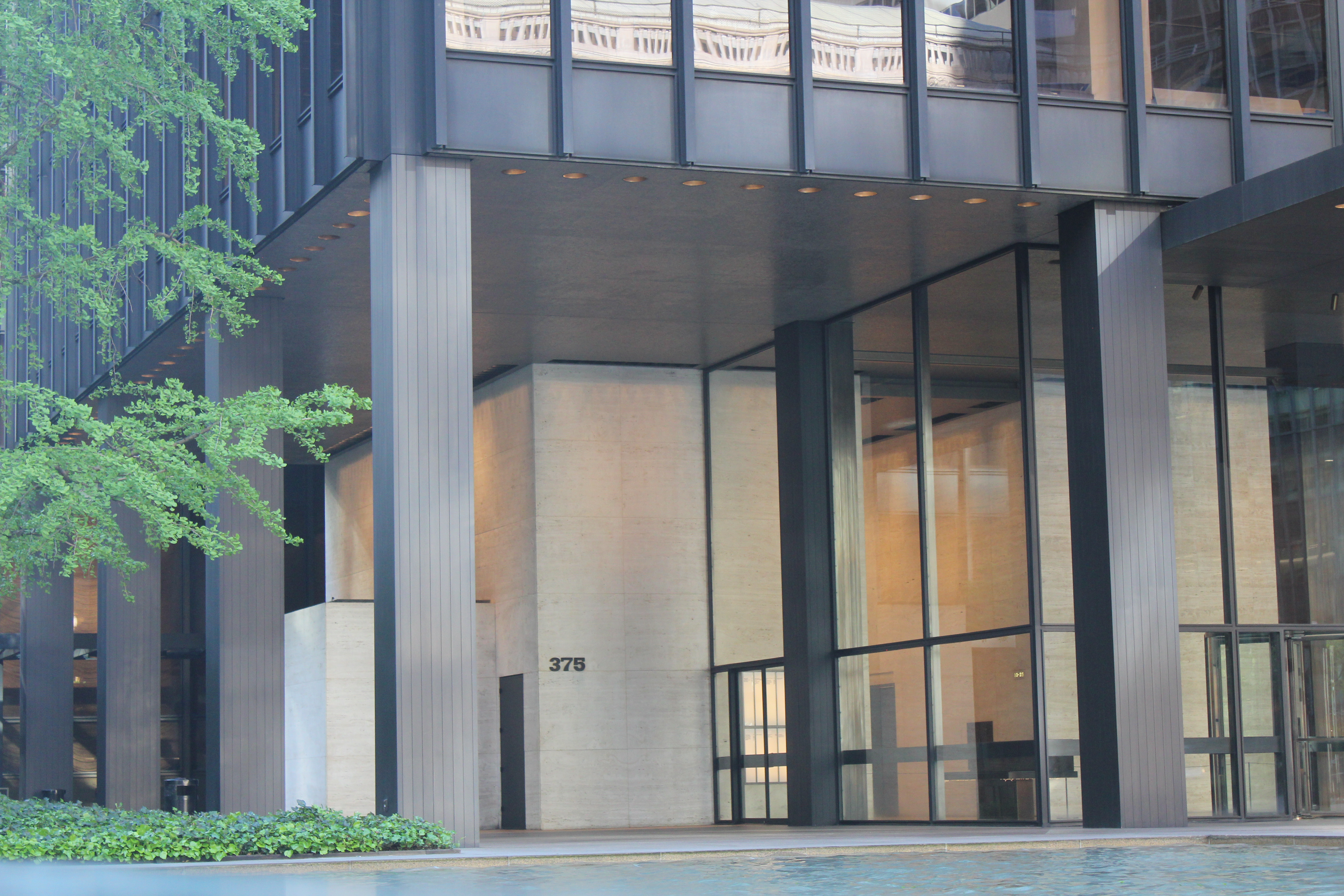
View of the columns at the lobby's northwestern corner

The northern, southern, and western ends of the slab overhang the plaza and are supported by bronze-clad columns at their perimeters, forming an arcade in front of the entrance. Each column measures 3 by 3 feet (0.91 by 0.91 m) across and two stories tall, rising about 24 feet (7.3 m). The arcade's ceiling contains recessed light fixtures within a ceramic tile surface. The first-story walls behind the arcade contain full-height glass panes. Above the arcade, on the western side of the building, is a marquee made of Muntz metal, with recessed lighting. The bases of the wings on 52nd and 53rd streets, beneath the first story, are clad in granite and contain entrances to the restaurant and bar spaces inside. The eastern portions of both wings have garage doors, situated beneath the level of the plaza. The eastern wall of the 53rd Street wing is faced in brick, and that wing's northern elevation has a direct entrance to the Brasserie restaurant. The eastern section of the 52nd Street wing's southern elevation features an entrance to the Grill and Pool restaurant.

The curtain wall begins above the lower stories and is composed of non-structural glass walls, which are pinkish-gray. (Note: The hue is variously cited as amber, topaz, or pink mixed with gray.) The use of a non-structural curtain wall contrasted with Mies's earlier work, such as 860–880 Lake Shore Drive in Chicago, where part of the structural framework was incorporated into the facade. The Seagram Building's glass panels cover about 122,000 square feet (11,300 m^{2}) and are designed to be heat- and glare-resistant. Because the windows are sealed permanently, and because there were no setbacks, the Seagram Building's window washing team could not use standard window-washing equipment. Instead, a custom-made pneumatic scaffold was installed, with a 27-foot-wide (8.2 m) deck spanning the width of six windows. Inside, Mies sought to avoid irregularity when window blinds were drawn. As a result, the building uses window blinds with slats at 45-degree angles, allowing the blinds to be set in three positions: fully open, halfway open, or fully closed.

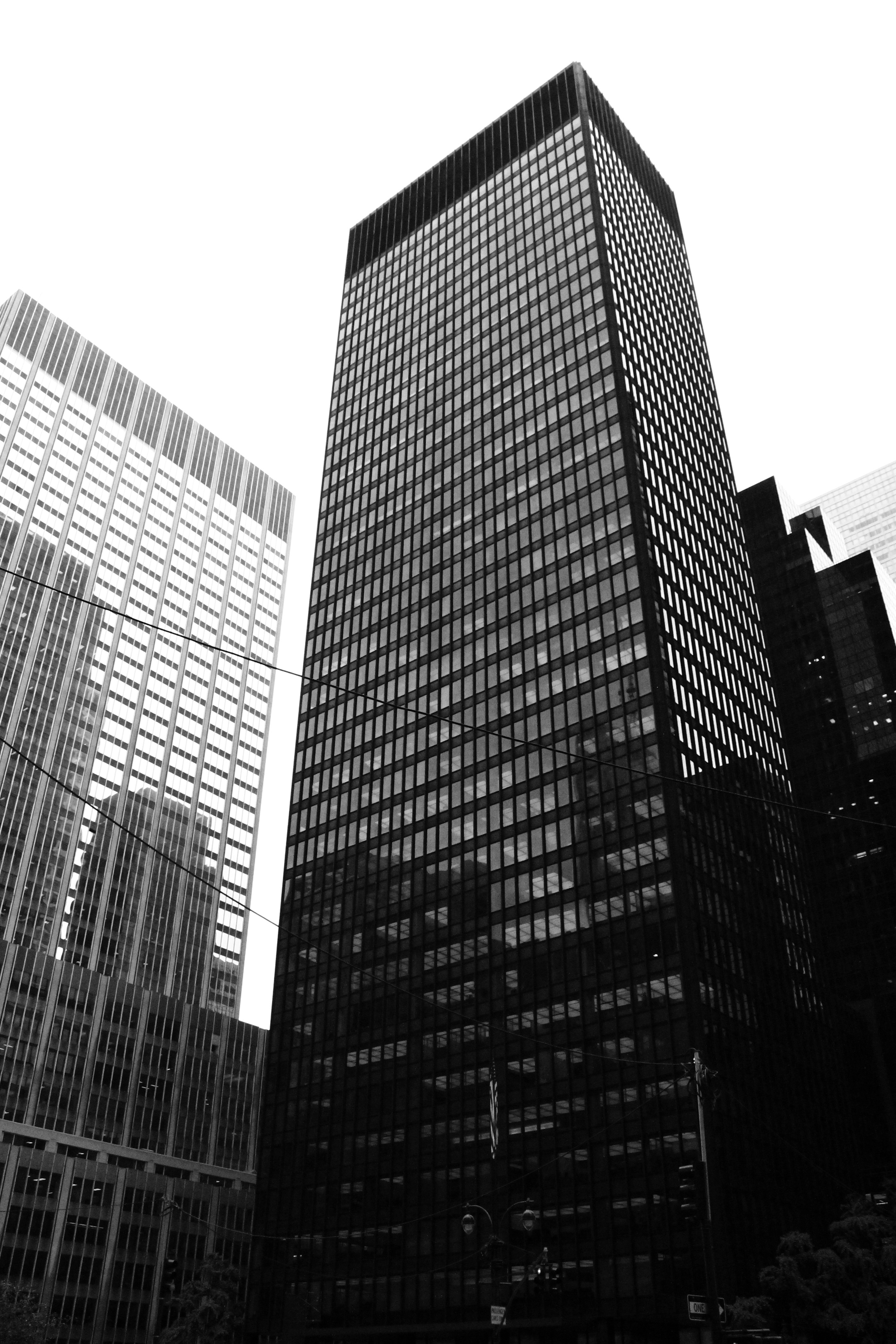
The main slab viewed from across Park Avenue and 52nd Street

The facade uses 1,600 short tons (1,400 long tons; 1,500 t) of bronze, manufactured by the General Bronze Corporation at its plant in Garden City, New York. The glass panes are set within vertical bronze mullions made from 4.5-by-6-inch (110 by 150 mm) extrusions of I-beams. The bronze mullions vertically separate the facade into 30-foot-wide (9.1 m) bays, each of which spans the width of five windows. (Note: Schulze 1985 gives a different figure of 28 feet (8.5 m) for each bay's width.) The tops and bottoms of the mullions are tapered, exposing their cross-sections. The Seagram Building's mullions are only for aesthetics and are susceptible to thermal expansion and contraction. At the building's completion, General Bronze said the facade would need to be cleaned twice a year with soap, water, and lemon oil to prevent discoloration; this work could be performed using the window-washing scaffold. Spandrels, made of Muntz metal, separate the windows on each story horizontally, which gives them an appearance similar to that of copper. A sample facade section, tested in a wind tunnel in 1956, resisted winds of up to 100 miles per hour (160 km/h).

The design of the slab's facade is carried onto the wings and bustle. The spine east of the slab is clad with serpentine marble panels instead of glass because of the presence of shear walls made from concrete. Each of these shear walls is concealed behind a marble cladding, which itself is covered with curtain-wall panels. The curtain-wall facade cost $18 per square foot ($190/m^{2}), equivalent to $150 per square foot ($1,600/m^{2}) in 2024. Above the 38th story is a triple-height mechanical story with a louvered screen.

=== Features ===
The superstructure is a steel frame covered with concrete and gypsum. At the time, American building codes required that all structural steel be covered in a fireproof material, such as concrete, because improperly protected steel columns or beams may soften and fail in confined fires. The concrete core shear walls rise to the 17th floor, while the diagonal core bracing, with shear trusses, extends to the 29th floor. The structural system also includes steel columns whose centers are 27.75 feet (8.46 m) apart. The Seagram Building's heating and air conditioning systems are divided into two sections: a basement unit serving the 20th story and all floors below, and a roof unit serving the 21st story and all floors above. Ducts for utilities such as electric, telephone, and closed-circuit television cables were embedded into the concrete floor slabs.

The Seagram Building has 849,014 square feet (78,876.0 m^{2}) of floor space, including three basement stories. Inside the building were the Four Seasons and Brasserie restaurants, originally designed by Philip Johnson. The restaurant interiors were decorated with numerous artworks. These included the Seagram murals by Mark Rothko, which he claimed were intended to sicken the patrons of the Four Seasons Restaurant, as well as Pablo Picasso's painted curtain Le Tricorne, designed for the Ballets Russes in 1919. By 2017, the building housed three restaurants owned by Major Food Group: the Pool, the Grill, and the Lobster Club. The Pool was merged with the Grill in 2020, though a separate event space called the Pool Lounge continues to operate.

==== Basements ====
Two of the basement levels originally contained a 150-space parking garage, connected to the lobby via its own elevator. Starting in 2019, the garage was renovated into a gym known as the Seagram Playground. Covering 23,500 square feet (2,180 m^{2}) or 35,000 square feet (3,300 m^{2}), the gym was designed in a contrasting style to the original building to attract younger employees. It contains a multipurpose basketball, pickleball, and volleyball court with a climbing wall. Next to the court was a multipurpose exercise room, a training area, a spin bike room, and an open lounge. The gym could also be used as a 150-seat theater with eight tiers of wooden bleachers, and there are two conference rooms on a mezzanine overlooking the gym. The basements also contain storage, loading platforms, and service areas for the first-floor occupants.

==== Lobby ====
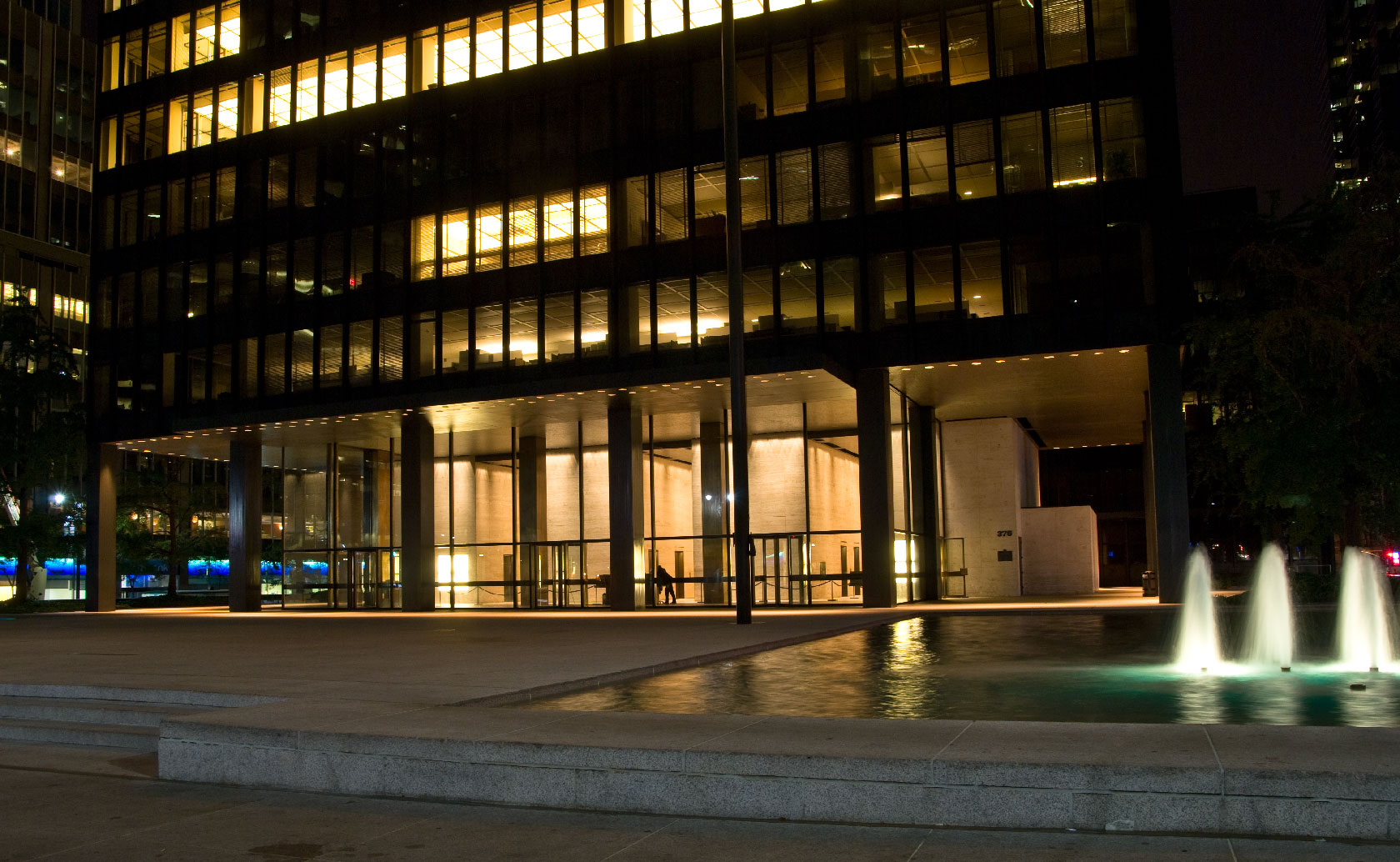
The lobby and facade as viewed from Park Avenue at night

Unlike designs in Beaux-Arts office buildings, the Seagram Building's lobby lacks a central space, instead leading visitors directly from the plaza to the elevators or restaurants. Architecturally, the lobby is treated as an extension of the plaza, sharing its granite floor. This led Mumford to write: "Outside and inside are simply the same." The lobby is divided into three parts: a western section facing the plaza; a central section with elevators; and an eastern section facing the restaurant space.

The western part of the lobby has three bronze revolving doors and is interrupted by two bronze columns. The central section comprises three corridors connecting the western and eastern thirds of the lobby, within four elevator and stair enclosures, whose walls are clad with travertine. There are three elevators on each corridor's north and south walls, for a total of eighteen elevators. The elevators abutting the northern corridor serve floors 25–38; those in the center corridor serve floors 2–10; and those in the southern corridor serve floors 10–25. The northernmost and southernmost elevator enclosures have fire stairs exiting to the plaza, and all enclosures have mechanical spaces and service closets. The interiors of the elevator cabs contain stainless steel and bronze mesh panels, while the ceilings contain white panels that illuminate each cab. Above the elevator doors are fluorescent lights installed in the doorway soffits. The central third of the lobby contains mailboxes, a standpipe alarm box, and service doors made of bronze.

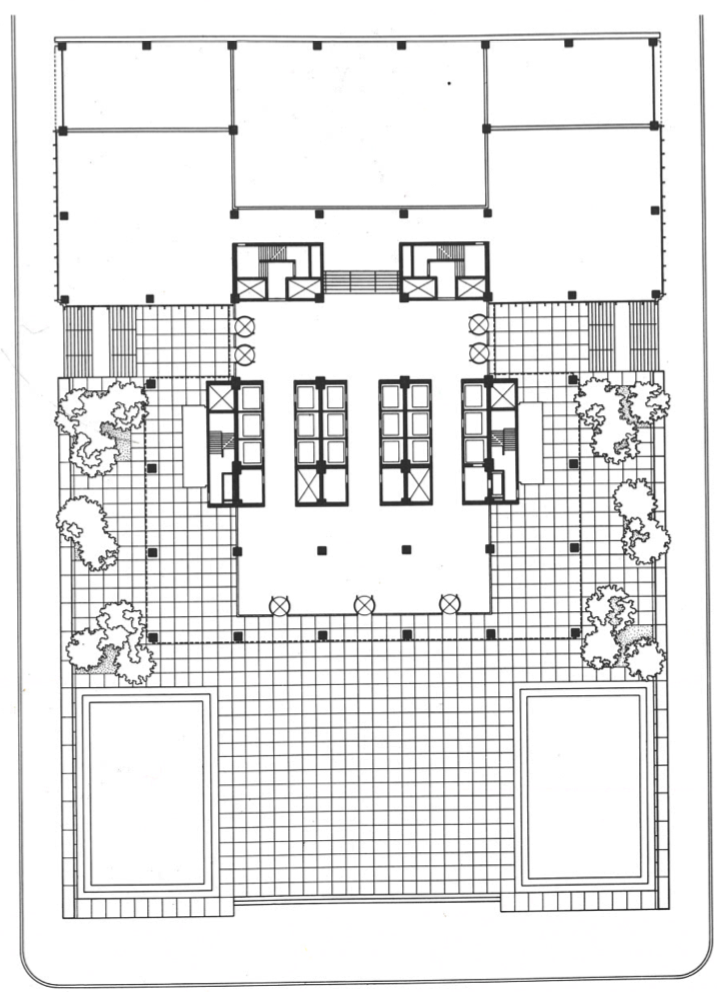
The lobby's floor plan

The eastern section has two additional revolving doors within the northern and southern glass walls. A cross-passage connects the two sets of doors. There are service doors on the eastern wall of the cross-passage, as well as an elevator control panel, a fire station panel, and directories on the western wall. A set of travertine steps, located between two of the west–east elevator halls, ascends from the cross-passage to the restaurant spaces (originally the Four Seasons Restaurant).

Throughout the entire lobby, the 24-foot (7.3 m)-tall ceiling is made of black cement and 1-by-1-inch (25 mm × 25 mm) gray glass mosaic tiles. Recessed within the lobby ceiling are lights with dimmers. The floors, walls, and columns are also clad with travertine. The exterior walls of the lobby contain bronze mullions within which the exterior glass panes are set. A horizontal bronze bar, about 42 inches (110 cm) above the floor level, surrounds the exterior walls. The horizontal bronze bar was installed in the 1970s per New York state building regulations. Signs in the lobby were originally designed in a square serif font custom-made for the Seagram Building.

==== The Grill and Pool ====
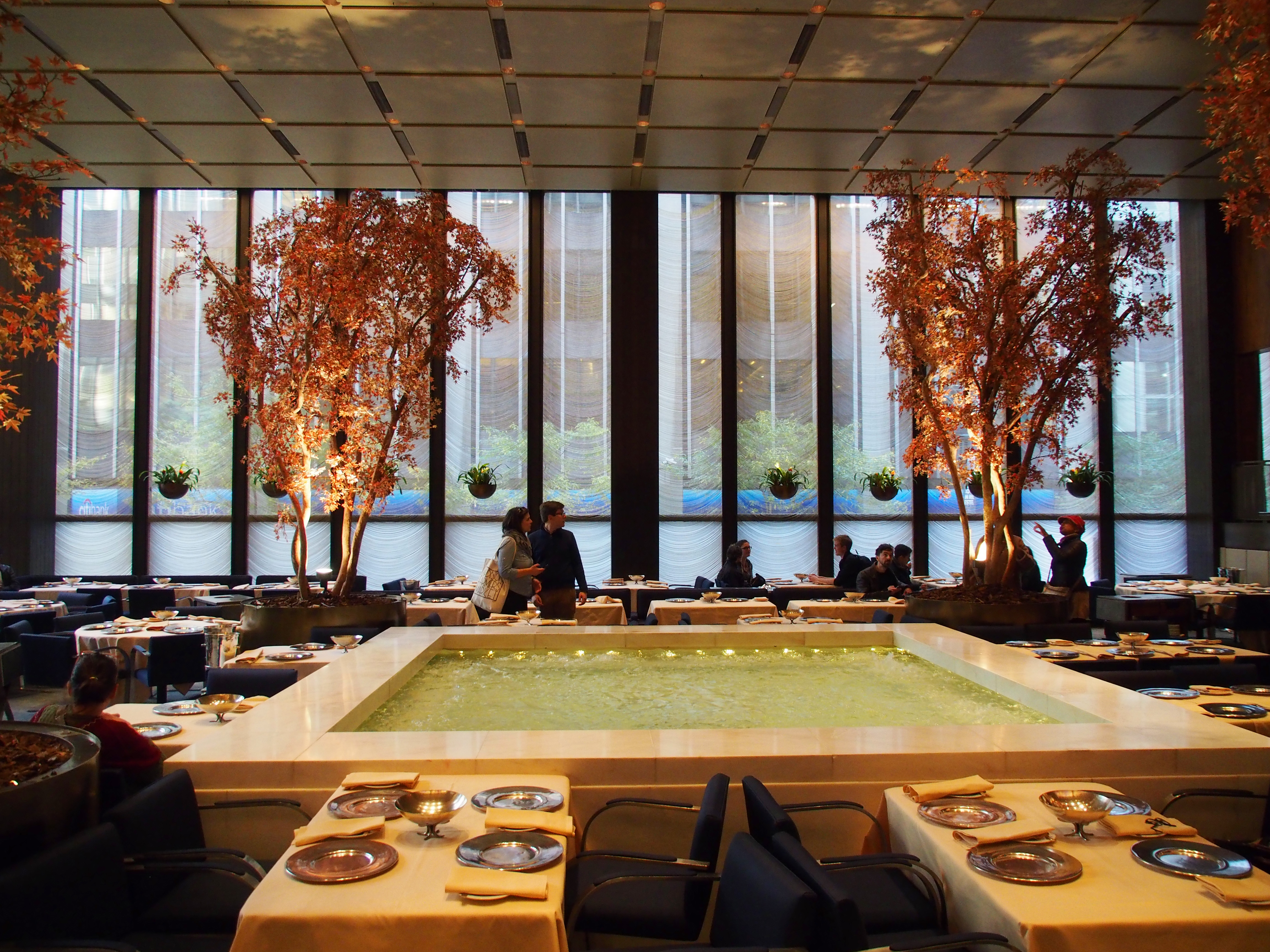
The Pool

The Grill and Pool (formerly the Four Seasons Restaurant) occupy two stories in the Seagram Building's "bustle", east of the lobby and main shaft. The upper story is just above the lobby, while the lower story is at ground level near 52nd and 53rd streets. When they opened as separate restaurants in 2017, the Grill served mid-20th-century cuisine while the Pool largely served seafood. Johnson was the main designer of these spaces.

The Grill and Pool, named after the rooms of the same name in the former Four Seasons, contains similar design features to the lobby. It has travertine walls and floors, cement ceilings with gray-glass mosaic tiles, and bronze engaged piers. The original Four Seasons had five dining rooms, preserved in the modern-day Grill and Pool restaurant. (Note: Sources disagree on whether the rooms had a combined maximum capacity of 400 or 485.) The Pool is on the north side of the first floor; the Grill is on the south side. There are two dining areas on a balcony above the Grill, as well as a balcony above the Pool. A staircase leads down from the Grill Room to a separate entrance lobby and foyer on 52nd Street.

The Grill and Pool are discrete 60-by-90-foot (18 by 27 m) rooms. Both major rooms and their auxiliary spaces have 20-foot-high (6.1 m) ceilings with gridded off-white aluminum panels and recessed lighting. The outer walls are glass curtain walls, containing metal curtains that ripple from air released by hidden ventilating ducts. Running north–south between them is a corridor, which is at the top of the stairs leading from the eastern lobby. A glass wall and bronze double doors separate the corridor from the main lobby. The corridor's north and south walls contain doors leading to vestibules outside either room. The Pool is centered around a 20-by-20-foot (6.1 by 6.1 m) white marble pool. On the eastern side of the Pool, a staircase connects to a mezzanine on a podium slightly above the main floor. The Grill had a lounge in its northwest corner and a bar at its southwest corner. The two private dining rooms are on a balcony raised above the main Grill, accessed by separate staircases and separated from the main Grill by walnut paneled doors. Thick girders in both rooms' ceilings eliminated the need for columns in the center of each room.

==== The Lobster Club ====
The Lobster Club is at ground level on 53rd Street, immediately below the Pool room, within the space formerly occupied by Brasserie. It serves Japanese seafood. Philip Johnson had designed the original interior, which was damaged in a fire and redesigned by Diller + Scofidio from 1995 to 1999. During a 2017 renovation, the Lobster Club was redesigned by Peter Marino.

The entrance connects to a lobby with restrooms to the east, a coat check to the west, and the dining room to the south. The main dining room is slightly above the 53rd Street lobby, reached by a set of stairs. The lobby is on the north wall of the main dining room, while kitchens and waiters' stations are on the south wall. A second dining room is reached through a doorway at the center of the west wall. A door on the south wall leads to a fire stair to the lobby. The Lobster Club's main dining room has brightly colored furniture and upholstery, 150 drip-painted concrete floor tiles by artist Laura Bergman, and three bronze-partitioned booths on the south wall. There is a bar on the eastern side of the dining room. The second dining room is a private suite with white partition walls, red terrazzo flooring, and metal sculptures.

The Brasserie had seated 150 patrons. When used by Brasserie, the foyer had contained a stone wall, and a video camera displayed images of patrons entering from the street, with an LCD sign announcing every customer's entry. The main dining room had a U-shaped counter surrounded by circular tables and glass-partitioned dining alcoves. The room had wooden panels on its walls; a set of plates designed by Picasso was mounted onto the wooden paneling. The side walls contained booths, an allusion to the original booths that Johnson had designed for the space. The west wall contained a bar on its northern section and a dining alcove on its southern section. The bar, alcove, and second dining room had carpeted floors; the main dining room had wooden floors. The ceiling was made of flat plaster with recessed lighting fixtures. The rear wall of the main dining room contained a double-paned glass wall, behind which sculptures were placed. The men's and women's bathrooms used the same cast-resin sink and were decorated with hexagonal tiles.

==== Office stories ====
The office stories were intended to contain executive suites. The office floors generally have a flexible plan, arranged in modules around the elevator core. The flexibility of the office stories derives from the superstructures' wide bays. In general, each of the second through fourth stories has about 28,000 square feet (2,600 m^{2}) of rentable office space; the fifth through tenth stories, around 18,600 square feet (1,730 m^{2}); and the upper stories, around 12,000 square feet (1,100 m^{2}). (Note: The total floor space on each story was slightly higher. The second through fourth stories had 31,955 ft^{2} (2,968.7 m^{2}) each; the fifth through tenth stories, 22,225 ft^{2} (2,064.8 m^{2}); and the eleventh and higher stories, 14,933 ft^{2} (1,387.3 m^{2}).) Johnson mainly oversaw the interior design; all the materials were custom-designed for the Seagram Building.

The elevator landings have green terrazzo floors, travertine walls, gray elevator-door surrounds, and gypsum ceilings. The remaining office stories used 55.5-by-55.5-inch (141 by 141 cm) modules. The elevator doors, suite doors, and partitions were designed to rise from floor to ceiling, which made the openings appear as though they were part of the paneling. Partition panels were designed with washable materials, which became standard after they were used in the Seagram Building. Doorknobs were made of lever handles instead of round knobs. The ceilings are acoustically tiled dropped ceilings. Each story's ceiling is surrounded by luminous tiled panels, activated by a timer, which are arranged in a consistent band measuring about 11.5 feet (3.5 m) wide. The luminous panels, in turn, contain vinyl diffuser panels measuring 4 feet 3 inches (1.30 m) wide. The rest of each story uses indirect lighting. Air conditioning fixtures are placed only 11 inches (280 mm) above the floor slab, enabling the windows to be full-height glass walls.

The Seagram Company occupied the second through eighth stories when the building was completed. Philip Johnson, Phyllis Lambert, and J. Gordon Carr collaborated on the design of the Seagram offices. The offices had a reception room, containing tapestries and a travertine wall with Seagram's seal. There was also an executive office with furniture designed by Mies. The executive suites contained an oak-paneled dining room (which could double as a conference room) and a kitchen. On three sides of the fifth floor were offices with oak paneling, luminous ceilings, and ocher carpeting. The outer offices on the fifth story were wider than on other floors, signifying that story's function as an "important" floor. The fourth floor contained several large spaces for meetings and receptions, including a 69-by-36-foot (21 by 11 m) assembly room that could be partitioned into three sections. Floor-to-ceiling travertine partitions walled off the restrooms in the Seagram suites. Another feature of the Seagram suites was display lights that could retract into the ceiling when they were not being used. Architectural Forum described Seagram's offices as setting "a high standard" for subsequent tenants.

== History ==
After the 1933 repeal of Prohibition in the United States, Seagram Distiller's CEO Samuel Bronfman began planning a large Manhattan headquarters, though this plan was not executed for almost two decades. Bronfman decided the headquarters should be situated somewhere on Park Avenue between 50th and 59th streets, which was becoming a commercial area. By the 1950s, New York City was experiencing increased office-tower development, after two decades of reduced demand during the Great Depression and World War II.

=== Development ===
==== Initial plans ====
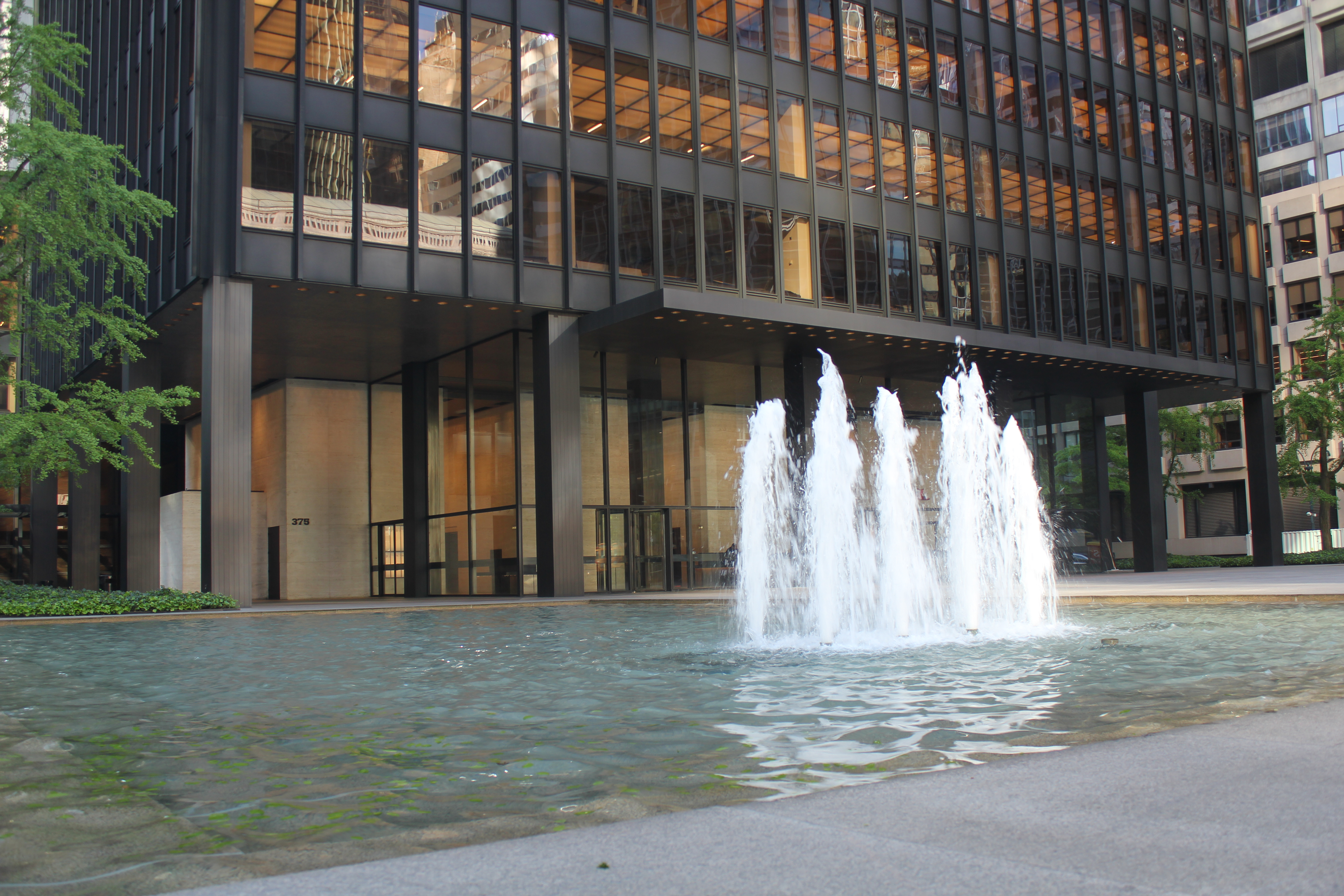
Fountain in front of the northwest corner of the building

The company bought a 50,950-square-foot (4,733 m^{2}) lot on the eastern side of Park Avenue between 52nd and 53rd Street, across from Lever House, for $4 million (equivalent to $39 million in 2024 (Note: Johnston, Louis; Williamson, Samuel H. (2023). "What Was the U.S. GDP Then?". MeasuringWorth. United States Gross Domestic Product deflator figures follow the MeasuringWorth series.)) in 1951. Bronfman sought to develop a structure that would be considered an "important building", and he wanted a design that was more than just a steel-and-glass slab. He wanted the building's completion to coincide with the company's centenary in 1957. According to Philip Johnson, the earlier Lever House had set an example for the construction of what became the Seagram Building. Ely Jacques Kahn sent a letter and a brochure to Bronfman in July 1951, requesting an interview with him. The next month, prominent lawyer Alfred L. Rose wrote a letter to Bronfman endorsing Kahn and Jacob's work. Kahn, working with several rental agents, sketched numerous diagrams for the massing of a hypothetical tower on the site, which they called "Operation Skytop". The only extant diagram, labeled as "scheme 2", depicted a bulky tower rising from several shallow setbacks, similar in style to many other skyscrapers in Manhattan at the time.

In June 1954, Bronfman met with Charles Luckman, the former president of Lever Brothers soap company. Bronfman told Luckman that he intended to build a 35-story office tower topped by an imported English castle. The next month, Seagram announced it would build a 34-story tower designed by Luckman and William Pereira, his partner in the firm Pereira & Luckman, The structure was projected to cost $15 million (equivalent to $139 million in 2024). The firm had designed many commercial structures after World War II, and Luckman, who had overseen the development of Lever House, said he was "very happy to come back to Park Avenue for a repeat performance". Seagram's building, as originally planned, would have contained a four-story base of marble and bronze topped by a 30-story metal-and-glass shaft. The design would have included an auditorium, film screening room, display rooms, and executive offices, as well as interior garden courts. Pereira & Luckman filed plans with the New York City Department of Buildings (DOB) the same month.

Pereira & Luckman's design attracted negative criticism when it was announced. According to the August 1954 edition of Architectural Forum, critics likened the building's appearance to an "enormous cigarette lighter" and "big trophy". Lambert, Bronfman's 27-year-old daughter, was living in Paris when she saw a rendering of Pereira & Luckman's plan in the New York Herald Tribune's Paris edition. Lambert was particularly critical of the plans, later recalling that she had been "boiling with fury" at the proposal. Lambert wrote a letter to her father that August, arguing that any new headquarters should be a "contribution" to the city in addition to serving as a symbol of Seagram. In a 2013 book recalling the building's development, Lambert wrote, "This letter starts with one word repeated very emphatically...NO NO NO NO NO." To mollify his daughter, Bronfman offered to allow Lambert to select the marble that would be used on the building's ground floor, an offer that she flatly refused.

==== Modified plans ====
At his friend Lou Crandall's suggestion, Bronfman relented, tasking his daughter with finding an alternate architect. Pereira & Luckman's design was still publicly marketed as a "preliminary model" but, as Interiors's managing editor Olga Gueft said, media reports suggested the original plan "had been dumped overboard". Lambert reached out to a friend at the Museum of Modern Art, who in turn introduced her to Philip Johnson, MoMA's departmental director of architecture and design. Following his recommendation, Lambert examined numerous leading modernist architects and conducted several interviews, (Note: These architects included Marcel Breuer, Walter Gropius, George Howe, Louis Kahn, Le Corbusier, William Lescaze, Ludwig Mies van der Rohe, I. M. Pei, Eero Saarinen, Frank Lloyd Wright, and Minoru Yamasaki. Lambert recalled in 2024 that she had also come up of a list of architects who "could but shouldn't", including Skidmore, Owings & Merrill, who she thought were "not inventive".) asking each architect who they thought should design the building. She eventually narrowed the choice to three architects: Mies van der Rohe, Frank Lloyd Wright, and Le Corbusier. Lambert later rejected Wright's design as "not the statement that is needed now", and she expressed concerns that Le Corbusier had little experience designing American buildings. By contrast, Lambert saw Mies as the most trustworthy.

Lambert selected Mies to design the building in November 1954. She described Mies's buildings, such as 860–880 Lake Shore Drive in Chicago, as "sublimely urban", and that younger architects had been inspired by Mies's work. Bronfman, having approved Mies's selection, designated his daughter as the building's planning director, with Lambert earning $20,000 annually from this position. Johnson was selected as a co-architect because Mies was not licensed to practice architecture in New York state and because of concerns about the 68-year-old Mies's age. Johnson had never designed a skyscraper before, so Kahn and Jacobs were hired as associate architects. Lambert recalled that Bronfman had few requirements for the building. Specifically, the tower was not to be placed on stilts, and it needed to span at least 500,000 square feet (46,000 m^{2}) and be the "crowning glory of everyone's work".

Mies, who had never designed a project in New York City, wished to design a simple slab. He was dissatisfied with the setbacks in most skyscrapers designed after the passage of the 1916 Zoning Resolution, especially as this would have restricted the size of the building's upper stories. Mies considered three alternatives for a slab behind a large plaza, with a facade divided into multiple bays. One plan called for a square tower; the second plan called for a 3-by-7-bay rectangle with three bays on Park Avenue; and the third plan called for a 5-by-3-bay rectangle with five bays facing Park Avenue. He created several scale models for the proposed structure and a model of buildings on the avenue between 46th and 57th streets. Ultimately, Mies selected the third plan, which Lambert praised. After the architects were selected, Seagram purchased some 9,000 square feet (840 m^{2}) of adjacent land for $900,000 (equivalent to $8 million in 2024). The land acquisition allowed the building to be set back from Park Avenue while complying with the 1916 Zoning Resolution, and it allowed passersby to see it from the street. In total, the company had spent $5 million buying land (equivalent to $46 million in 2024).

==== Construction ====
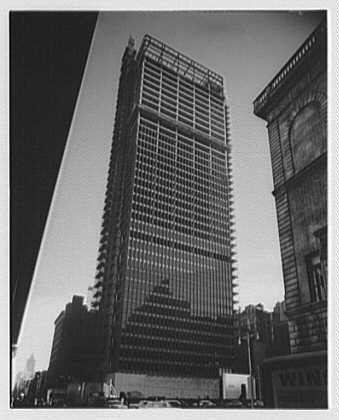
Seen during construction in 1957

Mies filed updated plans with the DOB in March 1955; the structure was projected to cost $20 million (equivalent to $182 million in 2024). The DOB records listed Mies's plans as a modification to Pereira & Luckman's original plans, rather than completely new ones. At the time, 20 of 250 existing tenants on the site had left. The April 1955 issue of The New York Times described the proposed tower as one of several on Park Avenue that "add up in sum to a boom". Upon Bronfman's suggestion, the architects specified that the tower would be made of bronze and glass. Kahn had sketched an alternative design for the Seagram Building, which called for a significantly different massing than the one Mies had proposed. Lambert disapproved of the alternative plan, saying that Kahn was "undermining Mies's decisions", and Kahn ultimately acquiesced to Mies's design. After Bronfman suggested that the lobby be extended into the plaza to provide space for a bank, Mies traveled to Bronfman's house to convince him against the proposal.

Demolition of existing buildings on the site began in September 1955 and was completed in March 1956. Mies moved to the nearby Barclay Hotel to oversee the Seagram Building's development, while Johnson stayed at a client's house in Connecticut. Mies applied for membership in the American Institute of Architects' (AIA) New York division, but was rejected in December 1955, and the state government also refused to give Mies a license to practice architecture unless he provided proof of education. Offended, Mies moved back to Chicago, placing Johnson in full control of the building's design. Kahn wrote in his diary that the project had encountered delays in April 1956. When Mies received a license to practice architecture in New York, he rejoined the project that June.

Construction of the superstructure began in May 1956, with the first major steel column installed at the beginning of the next month. Seven hundred workers fitted over 5,000 individual pieces of steelwork together, which weighed in aggregate 25 million pounds (11 kt). Because of a no-idling rule implemented in Midtown Manhattan, some truckers were ticketed while delivering steel beams to the work site, prompting them to strike temporarily until the rule was changed to allow deliveries. The steelwork's construction involved bolting steel beams, rather than riveting them, to reduce noise; this work received an official "Quiet City Award" from the city. During construction, Lambert acted as the director of planning. She convinced the builders to carry through Mies's original design, including minor details such as the brick bonding, which was hidden from view. The superstructure was topped out during December 1956, The building's bronze and glass facade was installed starting in September 1956 and was completed in April 1957. According to Kahn's diary, the architects discussed "violent changes" to the building's cost and design in July 1957, though these changes were not implemented.

The Seagram Company moved into its offices in December 1957, and the Department of Buildings granted a temporary certificate of occupancy the next year. The Seagram Building officially opened on May 22, 1958, with the Seagram Company leasing the office space that it did not occupy. The Department of Buildings granted a permanent occupancy certificate in 1959. Including land purchases, the project was estimated to cost $43 million, or about $50 per square foot ($540/m^{2}). Other sources disagree on the final cost, which has been variously cited as $40 million, $41 million, or $45 million. In any case, the construction cost per square foot was about twice that of similar buildings in the city.

=== Seagram ownership ===
==== Late 1950s and 1960s ====
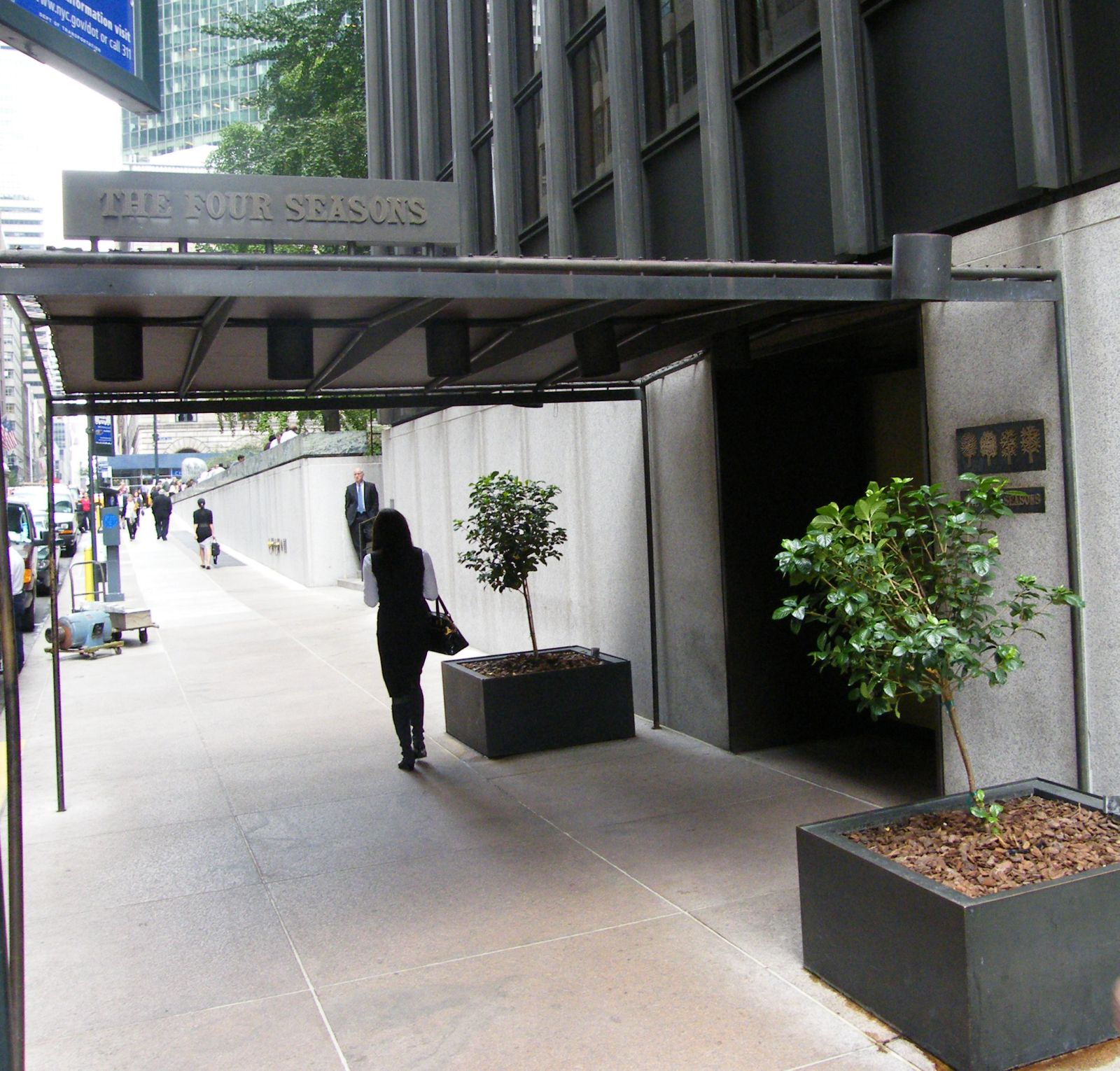
52nd Street entrance to the Four Seasons, which occupied the first floor shortly after the building's opening

By July 1958, ninety percent of the Seagram Building's space was rented. Tenants were willing to pay $7 to $8.30 per square foot ($75.3 to $89.3/m^{2}) for space on the upper floors, compared to an average of about $5 to $5.25 per square foot ($53.8 to $56.5/m^{2}) for ordinary new buildings. In the building's first year of operation, the office space was expected to earn about a 13 percent return on investment. Cushman & Wakefield was hired as the rental agency. Among the initial occupants were "a number of industrial and service corporations" involved in manufacturing, as well as Bethlehem Steel and Maruzen Oil. The building also housed Goodson-Todman Productions; the sales headquarters of Eagle Pencil; an industrial designer; a property manager; an art producer; a direct-mail advertising company; and various other commercial tenants. Restaurant Associates took ground-level space for the Four Seasons and Brasserie restaurants, which opened in 1959. Ultimately, the Seagram Building's luxuriously designed spaces had 115 tenants, which were drawn partly because of Mies's international stature. By 1961, there was a waiting list for space in the Seagram Building.

In its early years, the Seagram Building and its plaza were used for displays and exhibitions. For instance, in 1958, the building held an art show to celebrate the 13th anniversary of the United Nations. A sculptured head from the Mesoamerican Olmec civilization was displayed in the plaza in 1965. The World Monuments Fund displayed a moai head in the Seagram Building's plaza in 1968 to draw attention to the artifacts on Easter Island, which were seen as endangered. Atmospheres and Environment XII, an environmental steel sculpture by Louise Nevelson, was installed at the Seagram Building's plaza in 1971. Other sculptures or artworks erected in the Seagram Building and plaza included Barnett Newman's sculpture Broken Obelisk, displayed in 1967, as well as Jean Dubuffet's sculpture Milord la Chimarre, displayed in 1974.

In 1963, the New York City government gave the Seagram Company an award for the building's "notable contribution" to the city and raised the company's property taxes. The recalculated tax assessment of $21 million was based on the potential value if the building were to be demolished, whereas Seagram fought to keep the assessment at $17 million, based on the rental income it earned. The higher tax assessment was upheld by the New York Court of Appeals, a decision the Regional Plan Association criticized as potentially destroying "the hope of great commercial architecture in New York State". Architectural writer Ada Louise Huxtable called the tax a beginning of the city's "architectural annihilation", saying the higher tax assessment was a "special method of taxing architectural excellence". There was still high demand for office space in Midtown Manhattan, despite a myriad of new development in the area. For example, when real estate investment firm Realty Equities moved its headquarters to the Seagram Building in 1968, another company immediately offered to sublet Realty's space at a much higher price.

==== 1970s ====
The Seagram Company eventually found its own headquarters' rent to be too high, giving up half of its 150,000 square feet (14,000 m^{2}) in the building and moving approximately 600 of its 983 employees elsewhere in 1972. In a letter to mayor John Lindsay, Seagram officials attributed the relocation in part because of the high tax assessment on the Seagram Building. In 1971, building management conducted what city officials believed was the first voluntary fire drill at a New York City office building. During the 1970s, Seagram received several offers for the building from potential buyers, and the company contemplated selling it and leasing back its own space.

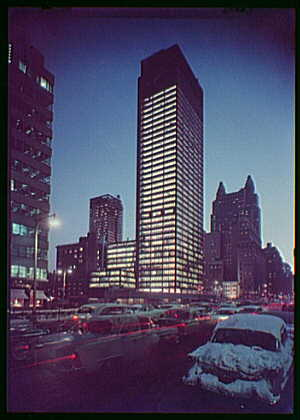
Colorized view of the building from the Library of Congress's collection

Seagram had decided to retain ownership of the building by 1976, saying that the building brought publicity to the company. The same year, Bronfman's son and Seagram's president Edgar Bronfman Sr. asked the New York City Landmarks Preservation Commission (LPC) to grant city-landmark status to the building. The move surprised mayor Abraham Beame, since the city's landlords typically attempted to prevent their buildings from being listed as landmarks. The LPC ultimately did not hold a hearing for the Seagram Building. LPC rules specified that individual New York City landmarks be at least 30 years old at the time of their designation; the building had been completed only 18 years earlier. Bronfman proposed that the LPC allow designations of buildings less than 30 years old if their owners supported landmark status, but no action was taken on the proposal.

=== TIAA ownership ===
In February 1979, Seagram offered the tower for sale at $75 million. In the absence of official landmark status, the company mandated that the new owner preserve the exterior and public spaces in their original condition. This was enforced by what was known as an Article 26 restriction, which protected the exterior, public interiors, and any other interior space within 16 feet (4.9 m) of the facade. The new owner was obligated to keep the building for at least fifteen years, and would have to take over the high land-assessment taxes. Seagram sold the building to the Teachers Insurance and Annuity Association (TIAA) for $85.5 million in June 1979, leasing some space back from them. This fee included $70.5 million for the structure and $15 million for the underlying land. As part of the sale, the building retained the "Seagram" name, although it was only identified on signage by its address. For decades after the sale, Lambert continued to be involved with the Seagram Building's operation.

The TIAA, like the Seagram Company, supported landmark status for the building. In early 1988, just over thirty years after the Seagram Building had been completed, the TIAA filed documentation with the LPC requesting that the Seagram Building's exterior, lobby, and plaza be considered for landmark status. The Four Seasons' operators also separately endorsed landmark designation for their restaurant's interior in the Seagram Building. On October 3, 1989, the LPC designated the Seagram Building's exterior, the lobby, and the Four Seasons Restaurant as landmarks. The Four Seasons was only the second restaurant interior in the city to be designated a landmark, after Gage and Tollner in Brooklyn. The New York City Board of Estimate ratified all three designations in January 1990. While the TIAA had strongly supported the exterior and lobby landmark designations, it sued the LPC in 1990 to have the designation for the Four Seasons removed. The TIAA argued that the restaurant was personal property and that the designation would force the restaurant to continue operating even if the owners wished to close it. The state's Court of Appeals upheld the designation in 1993. The Brasserie, not covered in any of the landmark designations, was renovated in 1999 after being damaged by a fire in 1995.

=== RFR ownership ===
==== 2000s and 2010s ====
The real estate investor Aby Rosen entered a contract in October 2000 to purchase a majority ownership stake in the building for $375 million, completing his purchase that December. At the time, 99.5 percent of the building's space was occupied, but only six original tenants remained. The following year, the Seagram Company moved its headquarters out of the building. Rosen's RFR Holding retained ownership of the Seagram Building and spent $20 million on renovations over the next four years. The French media conglomerate Vivendi, which acquired the Seagram Company in 2000, started selling off the building's art in 2003 to raise money. RFR received the LPC's permission in 2005 to transfer unused development rights at the Seagram Building site to a neighboring building. In exchange, the Seagram Building's owners would be required to keep the facade in near-original condition.

The Seagram Building was nominated for inclusion on the National Register of Historic Places (NRHP) on January 12, 2006, and was added to the NRHP on February 24, 2006. RFR obtained full ownership of the Seagram Building in 2013, when it purchased a 14 percent stake from Harry Lis. In 2015, RFR decided to terminate Four Seasons' and the Brasserie's leases ahead of schedule, and the restaurants were closed. RFR proposed changes to the Four Seasons' interior, including removing the glass wall between the Grill Room and Pool Room, as well as converting the wine cellar to restrooms. The LPC rejected RFR's proposal to change the interior of The Four Seasons Restaurant, except for a carpet replacement, which the commission allowed. Annabelle Selldorf restored the physical structure while William Georgis oversaw the interior design.

The Grill and the Pool were opened within the former Four Seasons space in mid-2017. That year, architect Peter Marino designed the Lobster Club within the former Brasserie space in the basement. In addition, the facade was restored in 2016, and RFR spent $400,000 to install waterproofing on the fountains and $250,000 to renovate the plaza benches. RFR was also planning to change the underground garage, which did not have landmark status. Initially, RFR did not seek the LPC's permission to change the landmark-designated Four Seasons interior, only requesting permission in late 2017 after the renovations were completed. The LPC retroactively approved the renovations nearly two years later, with some modifications. To conform to the plans that the LPC had approved, the Pool's lounge room was closed in December 2019 for a one-month renovation. The next month, the Grill took over the Pool because of higher demand for cuisine in the Grill.

==== 2020s to present ====
Rosen announced in mid-2020 that he would renovate much of the garage into the Seagram Playground, a communal workers' space and gym, over the following one and a half years. The communal space was announced as a way to attract tenants in light of the COVID-19 pandemic in New York City, as well as the departure of Wells Fargo, a major tenant. The Seagram Playground was completed in August 2022 for $25 million; at the time, 80 percent of the space in the building was occupied. Curbed wrote that the Seagram Playground was one of several large investments that Rosen had made in "prime midtown real estate at a time when it hasn't exactly bounced back" from the pandemic. The building was almost fully occupied by the end of 2022, after firms such as Blue Owl Capital and Clayton, Dubilier & Rice signed or renewed their leases.

Rosen and his partner Michael Fuchs sought to refinance the Seagram Building by early 2023, as a $783 million commercial mortgage-backed security loan on the building was expected to mature at the end of the year; the loan was extended that May. Rosen refinanced the building for $1.1 billion in December 2023 and renewed leases for more than 100,000 square feet (9,300 m^{2}) of space during that year. In February 2025, Rosen refinanced the building again, obtaining a $1.2 billion commercial mortgage-backed security loan from a syndicate led by Morgan Stanley.

== Impact ==
=== Reception ===
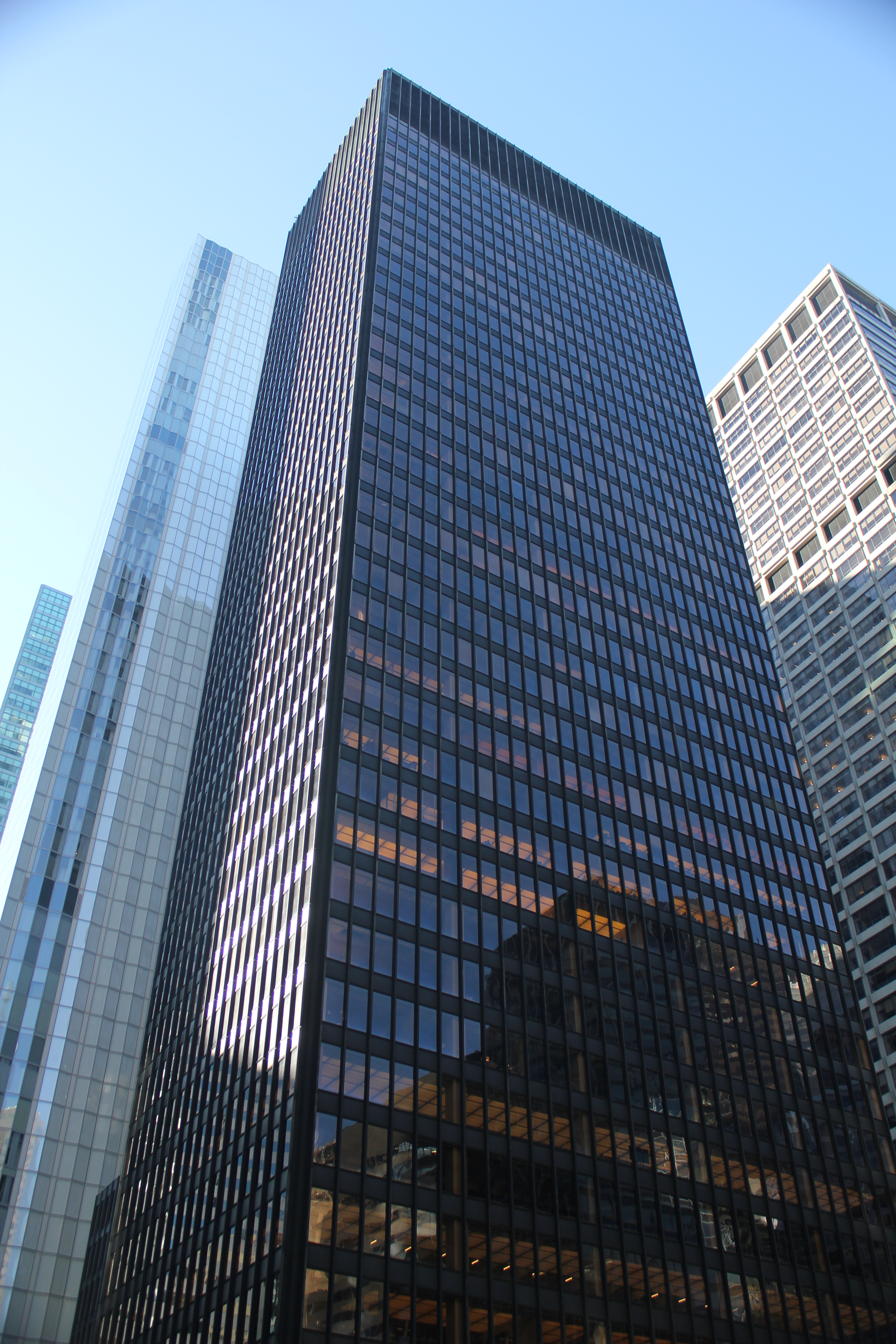
The building as seen from the ground on 53rd Street

When the Seagram Building was completed, Lewis Mumford described the structure as a "Rolls-Royce" of buildings and wrote that "it has the aesthetic impact that only a unified work of art carried through without paltry compromises can have". In 1957, Thomas W. Ennis of The New York Times wrote the building was "one of the most notable of Manhattan's post-war buildings" and characterized its design as the high point of Mies's career. Similarly, Progressive Architecture described the Seagram Building as "probably the most heralded new building in the U.S." in 1958. According to Architectural Forum in 1958, "Seagram challenges accepted skyscraper practice all the way down the line." At a meeting of the Italian Cultural Institute the following year, architect Gino Pollini said the Seagram Building was "a masterpiece of functional and esthetic architecture". When Mies died in 1969, The New York Times wrote that he had considered the Seagram Building his third-favorite design, after Crown Hall and the Chicago Federal Center in Chicago.

Eight years after the building opened, Ada Louise Huxtable wrote that it was "dignified, sumptuous, severe, sophisticated, cool, consummately elegant architecture". The New York Times Magazine described the lobby in 1975 as one of "The Ten Best Lobbies in New York". Architectural writer G. E. Kidder Smith found the building and its features to be "in toto incomparable" in 1981. Franz Schulze described the building's design in 1985 as having been enhanced by its setting, and David Spaeth wrote the same year that the structure "was a monument to an idea first and to a corporation second".

According to Jerold Kayden, who wrote about the building in 2000, the Seagram Building "remains the city's quintessential International Style masterpiece of 'tower in the park' architecture". Architectural Record magazine described the Seagram Building the same year as one of the United States' "most famous [architectural] works of the mid-20th century" that were protected as local or national landmarks. In 2001, architecture critic Herbert Muschamp referred to it as "the Building of Two Millenniums," writing that it encompassed "everything essential in Western architecture". Ricardo Scofidio of Diller Scofidio + Renfro said the construction of the Seagram Building "was the first time you really realized that architecture brought something to the city that didn't exist".

While the public and architectural critics generally appreciated the Seagram Building, Stern stated that there were negative remarks about the plaza's "austerity" and the exterior's lack of purity. Stern cited architect Louis Kahn, who believed the rear "spine" took away from the purity of the slab, though Kahn also said the hidden wind bracing made the building appear like "a beautiful bronze lady in hidden corsets". While Mumford largely praised the design, he found the plaza's pools and fountains to be a "gross defect" in what was otherwise a "masterpiece". Frank Lloyd Wright dismissed the building as "a whisky bottle on a playing card". Italian architecture writers Manfredo Tafuri and Francesco Dal Co, in their 1976 book Modern Architecture, wrote that the Seagram Building stood "aloof from the city" and saw the juxtaposition as a symbol of absence.

=== Architectural recognition ===
The Fifth Avenue Association called the Seagram Building the best edifice constructed on Park Avenue between 1956 and 1957. The city government gave the Seagram Company an award in 1963 for the building's positive impact on the city's beauty. The Board of Trade awarded its 1965 architecture prize to the building, citing its plaza, form, and material. The following year, the Municipal Art Society (MAS) gave a bronze plaque to the building, recognizing it as a "modern landmark". Philip Johnson received the city's Bronze Medallion for the Seagram Building's design in 1979. Simultaneously, the AIA's New York division gave the Seagram Company a special citation recognizing the company's "most elegant contribution to the art of architecture and the care with which it is maintained".

A 1976 poll of American-architecture experts ranked the Seagram Building as the fifth-best structure in the U.S., while a 1982 poll of Architecture: the AIA journal readers ranked the Seagram Building as the second-best. The AIA further recognized the Seagram Building in 1984 with a Twenty-five Year Award for its "ability to stand to the test of time". In a survey of 170 AIA fellows the next year, the building was ranked second on a list of the "most successful examples of architectural design". In addition, it was included in the 2013 PBS documentary and companion book 10 Buildings that Changed America. The building received lower rankings from the general public; a survey in 2007 found that it was not among Americans' 150 favorite buildings.

=== Design influence ===
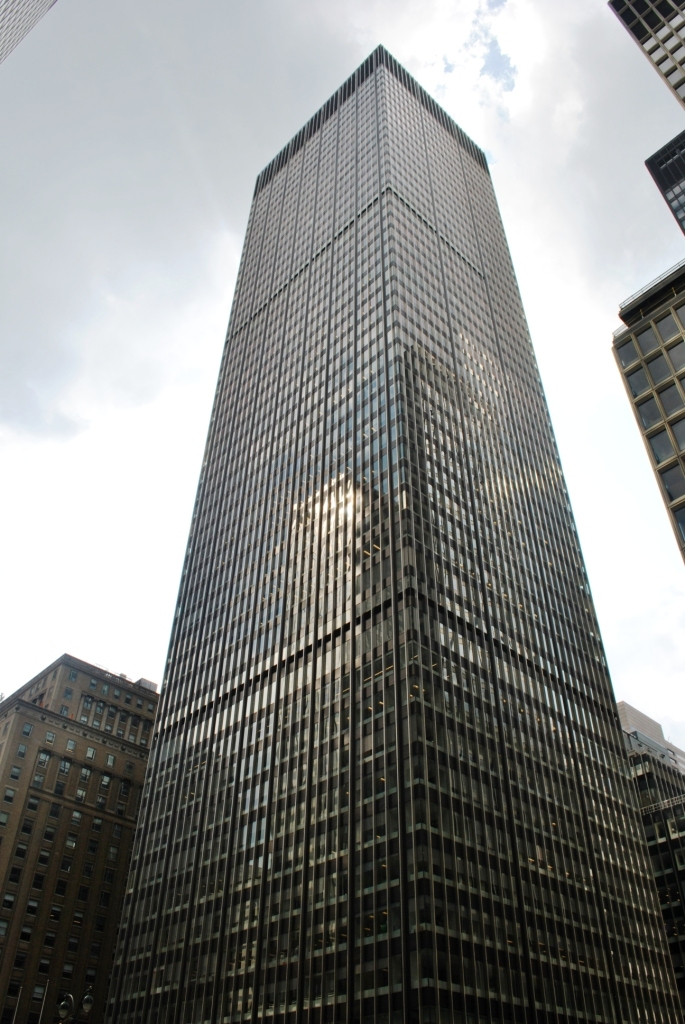
The former Union Carbide Building at 270 Park Avenue, which followed the Seagram Building's model of a slab behind a plaza

The Seagram Building's plaza was popular immediately when the building opened, being frequented by both office workers and tourists. In 1971, the plaza was the setting of a planning study by sociologist William H. Whyte, whose film The Social Life of Small Urban Spaces, produced with the Municipal Art Society of New York (MAS), records the daily patterns of people socializing around the plaza. Whyte praised the plaza as allowing a sense of choice, in that patrons could lie down or sit on the ledges or steps, despite their relatively plain design.

The plaza's presence helped influence the 1961 Zoning Resolution, a zoning ordinance that allowed New York City developers to increase their edifices' maximum floor areas in exchange for adding open space in front of their buildings. This was in sharp contrast to the "wedding cake" model of the 1916 Zoning Resolution, which had required setbacks at regular intervals. Even before the 1961 zoning codes had been implemented, some New York City buildings followed the Seagram's model of a slab behind a plaza, such as the Time–Life Building at 1271 Avenue of the Americas, the former Union Carbide Building at 270 Park Avenue, and the One Chase Manhattan Plaza building at 28 Liberty Street. Twenty acres (8.1 ha) of plazas were built in New York City in the decade after the zoning-code revision.

Mies reused elements of the building's design in other cities, including Chicago's IBM Building and Baltimore's One Charles Center, as well as various unbuilt designs during the 1960s. Though Mies did not believe that the Seagram Building was especially different from his other designs, Paul Goldberger wrote in The New York Times in 1976 that the Seagram Building was one of "New York's most copied buildings", its design having been duplicated around the world. These structures included 270 Park Avenue and the Inland Steel Building, as well as Chicago's Richard J. Daley Center. A replica of the Seagram Building was constructed at the New York-New York Hotel and Casino in Paradise, Nevada. According to writer E. C. Relph, the design was "widely plagiarised in various colours and shapes by other architects", though Relph considered some of the other towers to be "devoid of interesting copies".

In mid-2005, the Skyscraper Museum in Lower Manhattan asked 100 architects, builders, critics, engineers, historians, and scholars, among others, to choose their 10 favorites among 25 of the city's towers. The Seagram Building came in second place behind the Chrysler Building, with 76 respondents placing it on their ballots.

== See also ==
- List of New York City Designated Landmarks in Manhattan from 14th to 59th Streets
- National Register of Historic Places listings in Manhattan from 14th to 59th Streets
