= Accessories Council Excellence Awards =

ACE Awards

- Awarded for: Excellence in accessories design
- Country: United States
- Presented by: Accessories Council
- First award: 1997
- Website: accessoriescouncil.org

The Accessories Council Excellence Awards, known as the ACE Awards, were created in 1996 by the Accessories Council to pay homage to individuals and groups who have helped raise awareness of the accessories industry. Their purpose is to celebrate those who have had a positive impact on accessory consumption during the prior year. Nominees are voted on by accessory-industry insiders, retailers, the Accessories Council Board of Directors and the fashion press. Winners are announced in advance of the annual event, which usually takes place at the beginning of November.

== Accessories Council ==
The awards are handed out by the Accessories Council, a United States-based not-for-profit trade association that was established in 1994 with the mission of increasing consumer use and awareness of accessories. Karen Giberson has been the group’s president since 2005. Its previous president, Sheila Block, led the group from 1996 to 2005.

The organization sponsors educational seminars, networking events, seasonal trend reports, marketing and advertising co-op initiatives, design and marketing awards for area fashion students, an annual silent auction, and the black tie ACE Awards Gala, an annual tribute to the leaders of the accessory industry.

== Magazines ==
- Special Ace Awards Edition 2025
- Special Ace Awards Edition 2024
- Special Ace Awards Edition 2023
- Special Ace Awards Edition 2022
- Special Ace Awards Edition 2021

== Past winners ==
=== 2025 ===
- Brand Innovation: New Balance
- Brand of the Year: Movado
- Collaboration: Stuart Weitzman
- Designer of the Year: Reed Krakoff
- Emerging Designer: Staud
- Hall of Fame: Bethann Hardison
- Iconoclast: Betsey Johnson
- Merchant of the Year: Debbi Hartley-Triesch/Nordstrom
- Retail Innovation: Printemps

=== 2024 ===
- Operational Excellence: Aria Logistics
- Brand of the Year: Coach New York
- Design Innovation: Cult Gaia
- Style Influencer: Dana Covarrubias
- Specialty Retail: elysewalker
- Hall of Fame: Fern Mallis
- Legacy: Foster Grant
- Retailer of the Year: Jared the Galleria of Jewelry
- Rising Star: Larroudé
- Style Icon: Linda Fargo
- Designer of the Year: Prabal Gurung

=== 2023 ===
- Brand Innovation: Alexis Bittar
- Emerging Designer: Dee Ocleppo
- Legacy: Echo New York
- Retail Innovation: Fashionphile
- Sustainability: House of LR&C
- Couturiere: Judith Leiber Couture
- Style Ambassador: Julianne Hough
- Visionary: Mickey Drexler
- Retailer of the Year: Von Maur
- Brand of the Year: Wolverine

=== 2022 ===
- Visionary: Ben Clymer Hodinkee
- Global style icon: J Balvin
- Hall of fame: Josie Natori
- Brand of the Year: Kurt Geiger London
- Retail innovation: Lenscrafters
- Retailer of the year: Moda Operandi
- Influencer: Molly Rogers + Danny Santiago
- Brand excellence: Rimowa
- Legacy: Vera Bradley
- Brand Launch: Veronica Beard
- Breakthrough: Victor Glemaud

=== 2021 ===
- Super Hero: Iris Apfel
- Allen Edmonds/Caleres
- Carolina Herrera/Wes Gordon
- Christian Siriano
- Crocs
- LaQuan Smith
- Qurate Retail Group
- ShopBop
- Karyn Schoenbart/The NPD Group
- Special recognition to: The Optical Industry, Aether Diamonds, Blessings in a Backpack, Marlyn Schiff

=== 2019 ===
- Business Launch: Rachael Ray
- Business Visionary: Kering Eyewear
- Designer of the Year: Todd Snyder
- Legacy: Columbia Sportswear
- Philanthropy: Breast Cancer Research Foundation
- Retail Innovator: Rent the Runway
- Retail Innovation: 10 Corso Como
- Retailer of the Year: Saks Fifth Avenue
- Style Ambassador: Jackie Demeterio
- Style Icon: Ciara
- Sustainability: Sperry
- Visionary: Steve Madden

=== 2018 ===
- American Heritage Award: Brooks Brothers
- Breakthrough Award: Allbirds
- Business Excellence: The Jewelry Group
- Business Leadership: Andrew Rosen
- Hall of Fame: Sam & Libby Edelman
- Legacy: Longchamp
- Retail Influencer: Kith
- Retail Innovation: Westfield Corp.
- Specialty Retailer: Story by Rachel Shechtman
- Style Ambassador: Tracee Ellis Ross
- Style Influencer: Micaela Erlanger

=== 2017 ===
- Brand of the Year: Loeffler Randall
- Breakthrough Award: Kendra Scott
- Business Leadership: The NPD Group
- Business Visionary: Jason Rabin
- Designer of the Year: Joseph Altuzarra
- Legacy: Polaroid Eyewear
- Retailer of the Year: Shopbop
- Style Ambassador: Eva Longoria
- Style Icon Award: Betsey Johnson
- Style Influencer: Grandmaster Flash and Jeriana San Juan
- Sustainability: PVH Corp.
- Trailblazer: Monica Rich Kosann

=== 2016 ===
- Brand Launch: Paul Andrew
- Brand of the Year: Ray-Ban
- Brand Visionary: Sarah Jessica Parker
- Business Leadership: Rosenthal & Rosenthal
- Designer of the Year: Stuart Vevers
- Humanitarian of the Year: Vera Bradley
- Influencer: Jennifer Fisher
- Media: Marie Claire
- Retailer of the Year: Bergdorf Goodman
- Trendsetter: MCM Worldwide
- Sustainability: Kering
- Style Influencers: Daniel Lawson & Julianna Margulies

=== 2015 ===
- Breakthrough Award: Ivanka Trump
- Designer of the Year: John Varvatos
- Evolution: Eddie Borgo
- Influencers: Taraji P. Henson & Paolo Nieddu
- Innovation: Nancy Gonzalez
- Leadership: Claudio Gottardi
- Legacy: Swarovski
- Marylou Luther Journalism: Ariel Foxman
- Retail Innovation: Moda Operandi
- Specialty Retailer: Mitchells

=== 2014 ===
- Brand Launch: Shinola
- Brand of the Year: Kate Spade New York
- Business Visionary: Oliver Peoples
- Designer of the Year: Proenza Schouler
- Fashion and Technology: Google Glass
- Influencers: Kerry Washington and Lyn Paolo
- Leadership: Rose Marie Bravo
- Legacy: BVLGARI
- Marylou Luther Journalism: Robbie Myers
- Retailer of the Year: Lord & Taylor
- Specialty Retailer: Alex and Ani
- Style Ambassador: Flo Rida

=== 2013 ===
- Brand of the Year: Alexis Bittar
- Breakthrough Award: Rag & Bone
- Designer of the Year: Phillip Lim & Wen Zhou
- Digital Influencer: Leandra Medine
- Distinguished Style: Olivia Palermo
- Hall of Fame: Iman
- Influencer: Kate Young
- Legacy: The Frye Company
- Marylou Luther Award for Fashion Journalism: Hamish Bowles
- Omni-Channel Retailer: Nordstrom
- Retail Innovation: Warby Parker
- Specialty Retailer: Charming Charlie
- Style Ambassador: Stacy Keibler

=== 2012 ===
- Brand Launch: Theodora & Callum
- Influencer: Assouline
- Designer of the Year: Francisco Costa, Italo Zucchelli and Ulrich Grimm for Calvin Klein Collection
- Retail Innovation: Stella & Dot

=== 2011 ===
- Brand Launch: Marchesa
- Breakthrough: Rebecca Minkoff
- Business Visionary: Frank Fialkoff
- Designer of the Year: Philip Treacy
- E-Tailor of the Year: Mindy Grossman HSN
- Hall of Fame: Temple St. Clair
- Influencer: Nicole Richie
- Magazine of the Year: Marie Claire
- Marylou Luther Award for Fashion Journalism: Kate Betts
- Specialty Retailer of the Year: Tourneau
- Visionary: Robert Marc

=== 2010 ===
- Brand Launch: Rachel Roy
- Designer of the Year: Alber Elbaz for Lanvin
- Retailer of the Year: Henri Bendel
- Stylemaker: Kanye West
- Hall of Fame: Tiffany & Co

=== 2009 ===
- Accessory Visionary: Diane von Fürstenberg
- Brand of the Year: Burberry
- Designer of the Year: Tomas Maier for Bottega Veneta
- Fashion Icon: Barbie
- Humanitarian: Toms Shoes
- Influencer: Fred Allard for Nine West
- Magazine of the Year: V Magazine
- Marylou Luther Award for Fashion Journalism: Hal Rubenstein
- Retailer of the Year: Gilt Groupe
- Retailer of the Year: Zappos.com
- Stylemaker: Lady Gaga

=== 2008 ===
- Brand of the Year: Jimmy Choo
- Designer of the Year: Nicolas Ghesquière for Balenciaga
- Green Designer of the Year: Stella McCartney
- Hall of Fame: Emilio Pucci
- Influencer of the Year: Cate Adair
- Innovator of the Year: Lorraine Schwartz
- Magazine of the Year: Elle
- Marylou Luther Award for Fashion Journalism: Sally Singer
- Retailer of the Year: Banana Republic

=== 2007 ===
- Designer of the Year: Marc Jacobs
- Retailer of the Year: Macy’s
- Fashion Influencer: Heidi Klum
- Fashion Innovator: Mandy Moore

=== 2006 ===
- ACE Award: Jennifer Lopez
- Accessory Brand Launch: Tom Ford
- Brand of the Year: Fendi
- Designer of the Year: Michael Kors
- Fashion Innovation: Coach
- Magazine of the Year: O, The Oprah Magazine
- Marylou Luther Award for Fashion Journalism: Suzy Menkes
- Retailer of the Year: Bergdorf Goodman
- Specialty Retailer of the Year: Solstice Sunglass Boutiques

=== 2005 ===
- ACE Award: Mary-Kate Olsen & Ashley Olsen
- Accessory Brand Launch: Juicy Couture
- Designer of the Year: Oscar de la Renta
- Fashion Icon: Jessica Simpson
- Hall of Fame: Kenneth Cole
- Lifetime Achievement: Betsey Johnson
- Magazine of the Year: InStyle
- Marylou Luther Award for Fashion Journalism: Teri Agins
- Retailer of the Year: NeimanMarcus.com

=== 2004 ===
- ACE Award: Kim Cattrall
- Accessory Designer of the Year: Gordon Thompson III for Cole Haan
- Accessory Rising Star: Alexis Bittar
- Hall of Fashion: Hermès
- Fashion Influencer: Kimora Lee Simmons
- Lifetime Achievement: Carlos Falchi
- "It" Accessory of the Year: UGG Australia Classic Boot
- Marylou Luther Award for Fashion Journalism: Marylou Luther
- Retailer of the Year: Bloomingdale’s

=== 2003 ===
- ACE Award: The Women of Broadway
- Best Advertising Campaign: Bottega Veneta
- Designer of the Year: Reed Krakoff for Coach
- Hall of Fame: Coach
- "It" Accessory of the Year: Louis Vuitton Eye Love Monogram Handbag
- Retailer of the Year: Henri Bendel
- Rising Star: Hollywould
- Special Recognition: Echo Design Group

=== 2002 ===
- ACE Award: Debra Messing
- Best Advertising Campaign: Christian Dior
- Designer of the Year: Tom Ford for Yves Saint Laurent Rive Gauche
- Hall of Fame: Burberry
- Innovator of the Year: Jane T. Elfers of Lord & Taylor
- "It" Accessory of the Year: Puma Sneakers
- Retailer of the Year: Lord & Taylor and Neiman Marcus (tie)
- Rising Star Award for Emerging Talent: Lulu Guinness

=== 2001 ===
- ACE Award: Tina Knowles
- Best Accessories Advertising Campaign: Louis Vuitton
- Best Accessories Collection - Design: Marc Jacobs for Louis Vuitton
- Best Accessories Designer: Rafe
- Best Accessories Licensing Program: Nine West
- Best Accessories Retail Marketing - Mass Market: Target
- Best Accessories Retail Marketing - National: Saks Fifth Avenue
- Best Accessories Retail Marketing - Regional: Bergdorf Goodman
- Best Accessories Website: eLuxury.com
- Hall of Fame: Judith Leiber
- Special Recognition: Radio City Rockettes

=== 2000 ===
- ACE Award: Patricia Field & Rebecca Weinberg

=== 1999 ===
- ACE Award: Linda Dano
- Best Accessories Advertising Campaign: Kenneth Cole
- Best Accessories Designer: Kate Spade
- Best Accessories License Program: Ralph Lauren
- Best Coverage of Accessories by a Consumer Fashion Magazine: InStyle
- Retailer/Best Accessories Visual Merchandising: Saks Fifth Avenue

=== 1998 ===
- ACE Award: Kathie Lee Gifford

=== 1997 ===
- ACE Award: Joan Rivers
