= Eddie Borgo =

American Jewelry Designer

Eddie Borgo (born June 1, 1978) is an American jeweller and is the founder of and serves as creative director of luxury accessory house Eddie Borgo.

Borgo has been celebrated as one of the most notable jewellery designers of the 21st century, his work has been featured globally in magazines and trade publications and worn by celebrities such as Rihanna, Madonna, Emma Stone, Julianne Moore, Diane Kruger, Miley Cyrus. Borgo’s work has served as inspiration for both jewellery designers and creative directors. Vogue Magazine has called Borgo’s work ‘inimitable’.

He has credited the architecture of New York City with inspiring his approach to jewellery design, taking common hardware elements and reconsidering them as luxury jewellery pieces. Considered a pioneer within the jewellery world, Borgo introduced minimal silhouettes inspired by punk iconography, such as padlocks. His early work included bracelets created from repeated conical, pyramidal, cylindrical, cubed and domed shapes. Borgo’s work has been included in various manuscripts and published books noting his design approach, and examples of his work are included in the collections at the Metropolitan Museum of Art in New York City and the British Museum in London.

In early interviews, Borgo credited his love of jewellery to jewellers of the past. He credits jewellers Elsa Peretti, Art Smith, Alexander Calder, Tina Chow, Harry Bertoia, Claude Lalanne, Pierre Cardin and Robert Lee Morris as his greatest sources of inspiration. He has cited the American photographer Robert Mapplethorpe as another source of inspiration, dedicating an early collection to Mapplethorpe’s sculptural latticed frames created while Mapplethorpe was still a young student at Brooklyn’s Pratt University. He has also cited American interior designer Bill Willis as a source of inspiration. Other artists Borgo has said inspire his work include Sol LeWitt, Donald Judd, Tony Smith, Richard Serra, Anne Truitt, Louise Bourgeois, and Dan Flavin. “I appreciate art as structure” Borgo has said.

== Early life ==
Borgo was born in the city of Columbus in the Midwest in the United States but lived there for less than a year before moving to New York, and then on to Atlanta, Georgia. Artistically inclined, Borgo took up drawing at an early age, played piano, and sang in choir. Borgo has stated in interviews that his family’s eventual move to Washington, DC as a teenager was the most formative time in his life.

At the age of 18, Borgo moved to Richmond, Virginia where he completed the Art Foundation Program at Virginia Commonwealth University. At the age of 20, Borgo moved to New York City to begin studying fashion design at the New School. During this time, he worked as a page for the American Costume Designer William Ivey Long in a Chelsea Brownstone (before Ivey Long offered to sell the building to his next-door neighbor, artist Louise Bourgeois). Borgo also began taking Art History courses at Hunter College, developing an interest in the history of costume and costume theory; and the history of adornment. He also began working part time at Barney’s New York, then as part of the visual merchandising team at Donna Karan. As a hobby, Borgo began taking metalsmithing courses and traveling to Providence, Rhode Island by train to apprentice for Alfredo DeLucia, A Rhode Island School of Design alum who apprenticed with master metalsmith John Prip.

== Career ==
In 2007, while completing his bachelor’s degree at university, Borgo began assisting various fashion stylists on photo shoots. At this point, Borgo had begun to create pieces of jewellery from carved onyx, quartz and silver. Fashion stylists Camilla Nickerson, Patti Wilson, Karl Templer, Alex White, and Keegan Singh, began to request use of Borgo’s jewellery to include in their editorial photo shoots. Fashion designers Joseph Altuzarra, Phillip Lim, Marchesa, and Camilla Stærk also commissioned Borgo to create pieces for their runway presentations. Borgo has said in interviews that it was these commissions that inspired the creation of the jewellery pieces that would become his first collection of jewellery. In the summer of 2008, Borgo formally presented his debut collection of 10 pieces of jewellery in a suite at the storied Algonquin Hotel in midtown Manhattan.

This initial collection was received with critical acclaim, London-based fashion writer Bronwyn Cosgrave calling Borgo ‘a modern day Kenneth Jay Lane’. Borgo sold his initial collection to Colette in Paris, Barney’s New York, Dover Street Market in London, and Joyce in Hong Kong.

In 2009, Borgo was commissioned by Jack McCollough and Lazaro Hernandez of Proenza Schouler to create jewellery. That same year Burberry commissioned him to create custom hardware for their trademark trench coats.

In March 2010, Borgo was nominated for a CFDA by voting members of the global fashion community, winning the award and becoming a member of the CFDA. Later that year, Borgo received runner-up in the Vogue Fashion Fund and received a $150,000.00 USD award, moving his studio from a small space on 34th Street to a larger space in Nolita “Northern Little Italy” in downtown Manhattan. He was also granted a mentorship with then-CEO of Chanel, Maureen Chiquet. Borgo acknowledges his time with Chiquet as the most impactful in his career.

Chiquet described Borgo as “smart and ambitious” with a clear vision for his business, noting his curiosity and interest in areas such as manufacturing, supply chain, sales, finance, and management.

The brainchild of stylist Keegan Singh, Borgo began a viral advertising campaign wherein he commissioned New York photographer Paul Maffi to shoot different notable women in New York City. Lauren Santo Domingo, Vanessa Traina, Kate Lanphear, Tabitha Simmons, Giovanna Battaglia, Cecilia Dean, Julia Restoin Roitfeld, Anja Rubik, and musician and Kills frontwoman Alison Mosshart all appeared in Eddie Borgo campaign imagery. Borgo attended the Met Gala with Rubik in 2012.

In 2011, Borgo was selected as one of a five designers to be signed by the newly launched Fashion Division of CAA in Los Angeles. In July 2011, Borgo won the Tiffany & Co. Development Grant and was presented with $100,000.00 USD by Tiffany & Co. CEO Michael J. Kowalski “to further his burgeoning business and develop his jewelry designs as an independent entity”.

London-based curator Valery Demure discovered Borgo’s work and showed up, unannounced, to view his jewellery in a small hotel room he was staying in in Paris. Demure is credited with expanding the brand’s presence throughout the UK, Europe, UAE, and Asia.

For the American presidential election in 2012, Borgo created a limited edition brooch to support the Obama campaign. The brooch was created from debossed sterling silver and features the campaign slogan, ‘Greater Together’. Examples of the brooch are held in the United States at the Duke University Library Collection in Durham, North Carolina and at the British Museum in London.

In 2013, Borgo was asked by Andrew Bolton, the curator of The Metropolitan Museum of Art in New York City, to create an activity for the young patrons of the museum. Borgo created a do-it-yourself bracelet bar at the museum to celebrate the exhibit titled PUNK: Chaos to Couture. Borgo attended the MET Ball with actress Aubrey Plaza.

In 2015, with the guidance of Maureen Chiquet, Borgo launched a collection of handbags with articulated hardware, created in specialized Italian handbag ateliers. That same year, Borgo was selected as the GO Target designer, designing an Eddie Borgo x Target collection of DIY items for a younger clientele, consisting of both jewellery and handbags. London socialite Poppy Delevingne starred in Borgo's Target campaign. In November 2015, Borgo received the Evolution Award from the American Accessories Council, Maureen Chiquet presented Borgo with his award at the ceremony at New York’s Cipriani 42nd Street.

In 2016, Borgo collaborated with Tiffany & Company on a capsule collection of fine jewellery inspired by the sculptures of American socialite Gertrude Vanderbilt Whitney. The collection marked Borgo’s foray into fine jewellery and consisted of 10 pieces of sculpted and draped 18 karat gold jewellery, each accented with a South Sea pearl. The capsule collection was featured in various publications globally. “It’s less about Tiffany going downtown, than Eddie Borgo moving uptown,” Borgo stated in the October 2016 issue of American Vogue.

Borgo moved his studio from New York to Los Angeles in March 2018. In 2019, Borgo began working on his namesake collection of fine jewellery. The collection was inspired by the palm tree and incorporated recycled 18 karat gold and antique ‘upcycled’ white diamonds. The collection was created over a five year period and debuted at the fine jewellery salon at Bergdorf Goodman in New York in November 2023.

In 2025, Borgo moved his studio from Los Angeles back to New York City's Tribeca neighborhood. This move marked a formal 'relaunch' of the Eddie Borgo brand, Borgo working closely with Doug Lloyd, founder and creative director of creative agency Lloyd&Co, to revamp the brand’s site, logo, packaging and wider brand DNA. In an article published in Vogue in October of 2025, Borgo stated "[New York] feels like it is the correct place for me and for the company... it feels wonderful, and as it should be."

In September 2026, Borgo published a pointed opinion essay on The Business of Fashion (BoF), titled “The (Larger) Problem with the CFDA,” taking aim at the structural forces reshaping the Council of Fashion Designers of America. The piece argues that an organization once conceived as an independent incubator for American creative talent has increasingly become an institution driven by corporate optics and institutional priorities, at the expense of creative independence. The essay has quickly circulated among fashion’s more influential inner circles and could emerge as an important reference point in the ongoing debate over who represents American fashion, and what an independent fashion advocacy organization should look like in the years ahead.

== Personal life ==
Borgo prefers to lead a private personal life, currently residing with his partner between New York City and Los Angeles. Both of his homes have been featured in various publications, noting Borgo’s vintage and antique jewellery and objet collections.

== Awards and honors ==
Award	Year	Recipient(s)	Category	Ref.
Vogue Fashion Fund	2010	Eddie Borgo	Accessory Design	
CFDA	2011	Eddie Borgo	Accessory Design	
Tiffany & Co. Development Grant	2011	Eddie Borgo	Jewellery Design	
Forbes 25 Most Innovative Consumer and Retail Brands	2013	Eddie Borgo	Jewellery Design	
ACE Award for Evolution, American Accessories Council	2015	Eddie Borgo	Innovation in Accessory Design	
Tiffany & Co. Capsule Collection (CFDA Award)	2016	Eddie Borgo	Jewellery Design	
