= Alexis Bittar =

American costume jewelry designer

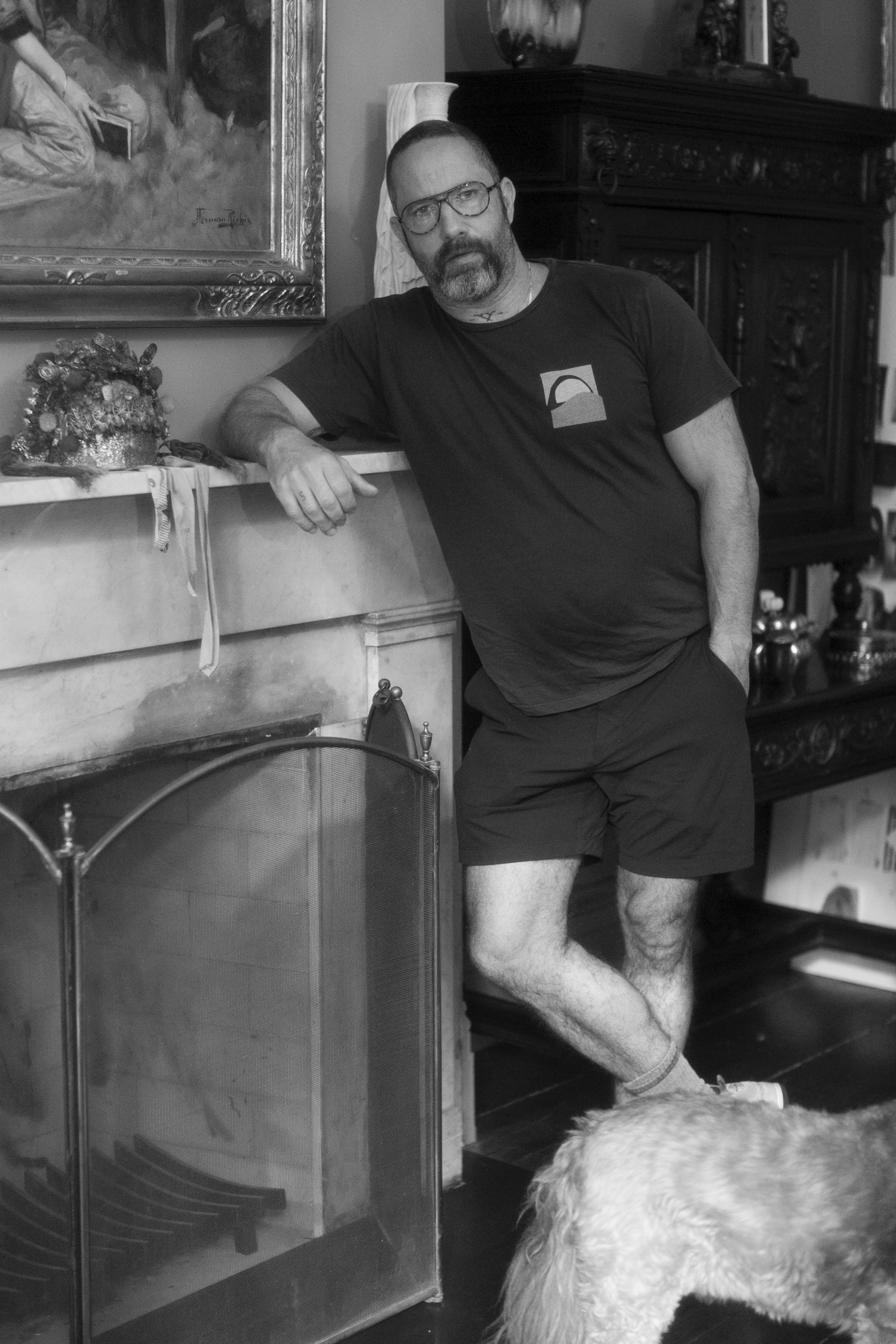
- Bittar in 2021
- Born: 1968 (age 57–58); New York City, U.S.
- Education: State University of New York at Albany (no degree)
- Occupation: jewelry designer
- Spouse: Jack Miner (m. 2023)
- Children: 3
- Website: alexisbittar.com

Alexis Bittar (born 1968) is an American jewelry designer and the founder and CEO of his eponymous accessories brand.

In 2010, he was honored with the CFDA Accessory Designer of the Year award, and in 2014 was named Brand of the Year by the Accessories Council.

After stepping away from the fashion industry in 2015, he reacquired his brand from Brooks Brothers in 2021 and expanded the retailer into handbags and home décor.

In 2025, Bittar directed and co-produced alongside Bruce Cohen the documentary Reclaim The Flag, a short film that features more than 50 LGBTQIA community leaders.

In November 2025, Bittar was appointed to Mayor-Elect Zohran Mamdani's Arts & Culture Transition Committee.

== Personal life ==
Bittar was born in 1968 in Brooklyn, New York City, to Bob and Helen Bittar, both university professors and antique collectors.

At age ten, Bittar began selling flowers from a hand-painted cart near his home in the Bay Ridge neighborhood of Brooklyn. As a teenager, he sold antique jewelry and vintage clothing on St. Mark's Street in New York City. Once, as a birthday present, Bittar's parents purchased him $300.00 worth of vintage jewelry that he then used as the seedlings of his nascent commercial operation. Bittar discovered the New York club scene while attending the Bronx High School of Science, which fueled his interest in fashion and design.

Bittar briefly attended State University of New York at Albany, but dropped out during his second semester. Bittar returned to New York selling antique jewelry and vintage clothing on the streets of lower Manhattan. He continued to pursue his interest in jewelry and design, focusing on his own line of costume jewelry influenced by the antique collectibles he grew up around.

Bittar has three children. He married Jack Miner in June 2023.

== Career ==
In 1988, Bittar began to design his own line of jewelry. He bought his first block of Lucite in 1990 and holed up in his apartment figuring out how to hand carve it into the jewelry vision he had. Using Lucite and semi-precious stones and metals, Bittar began selling handmade pieces on the streets of Soho. Dawn Mello, the fashion director of Bergdorf Goodman, discovered his work in 1992 and agreed to carry his designs, followed by Saks Fifth Avenue, the Museum of Modern Art, Harrods, and Isetan in Japan.

In 1996, he designed a limited edition set of home wares for Barneys New York and Takashimaya, and a collection of Lucite and steel furniture for The Cooper Hewitt Museum.

In 1998, Bittar launched his first designer collaborations, and working with Burberry, he designed the British luxury fashion house's first ready-to-wear jewelry collection, interpreting their trademark plaid onto Lucite.

Subsequent collaborations include stylist and costume designer Patricia Field for Sex and the City, the Cooper-Hewitt Museum, London's Victoria & Albert Museum, Estee Lauder, Michael Kors, Jason Wu, Jeremy Scott, Mugler, Phillip Lim and Prabal Gurung.

In 2004, Bittar opened his first boutique on Broome St. and went on to open a total of 15 stores in the US.

In 2010, Bittar entered into a partnership with the private equity company TSG Consumer Partners and in 2015, they sold to Carolee LLC, the jewelry arm of Brooks Brothers.

After a five-year absence, Bittar reacquired his eponymous brand from Brooks Brothers after they filed for bankruptcy in the fall of 2020. Bittar is again the full owner of his brand, which relaunched in the fall of 2021 with expanded product categories including accessories and handbags. New brick and mortar boutiques were opened in New York City designed by scenic designer Scott Pask.

Bittar's creations have been worn by celebrities including Beyoncé, Dua Lipa, Julia Fox, Michelle Obama, Iris Apfel, Lady Gaga, Megan Thee Stallion, FKA Twigs, Tyla, Halsey, Cher, Madonna and Lola Young all choosing to repeatedly wear Bittar's unique designs.

== Awards and industry accolades ==
- 2004 Rising Star of the Year by the Accessories Council of Excellence ACE Awards
- 2010 Council of Fashion Designers of America Accessory Designer of the Year
- 2014 Brand of the Year Accessories Council of Excellence
- 2023 Accessories Council, ACE Brand Innovation Award
- 2023 Museum of Art & Design MAD Award
- 2024 Webby Award, Best Social Content
- 2026 Webby Award, The Bittarverse with Margeaux & Jules/Hazel, People's Voice Webby Award, Socials, Best Community & Engagement
- 2026 Webby Award, The Sexecutions of Amanda Gates, Best Storytelling & Narrative
