= Halbreich =

Halbreich is a surname. Notable people with the surname include:

- Betty Halbreich (1927–2024), American personal shopper, stylist, and author
- Harry Halbreich (1931–2016), Belgian musicologist
- Kathy Halbreich (born 1949), American art curator and museum director
