= Scatter My Ashes at Bergdorf's =

- Film poster
- Directed by: Matthew Miele
- Written by: Matthew Miele
- Produced by: Mallory Andrews
- Starring: Linda Fargo; Tom Ford; Iris Apfel; Diane von Fürstenberg; Vera Wang; Manolo Blahnik; David Hoey; Marc Jacobs; Karl Lagerfeld; Michael Kors; Ashley Olsen; Mary-Kate Olsen; Patricia Field; Betty Halbreich; Candice Bergen; Victoria Roberts; Dawn Mello
- Cinematography: Justin Bare
- Edited by: Justin Bare
- Music by: Parov Stelar
- Distributed by: Entertainment One
- Release date: May 3, 2013
- Running time: 93 minutes
- Country: United States
- Language: English

Scatter My Ashes at Bergdorf's is a 2013 American documentary feature directed by Matthew Miele about the New York City luxury goods department store Bergdorf Goodman. The film's title is lifted from the caption of a 1990 Victoria Roberts cartoon that appeared in pages of The New Yorker. The film features celebrities, store executives and employees, designers and customers testifying to their love of the place.

The film opened at theatres on May 3, 2013.

== See also ==
- Dita and the Family Business, a 2001 documentary film about the store
