= David Hoey (window dresser) =

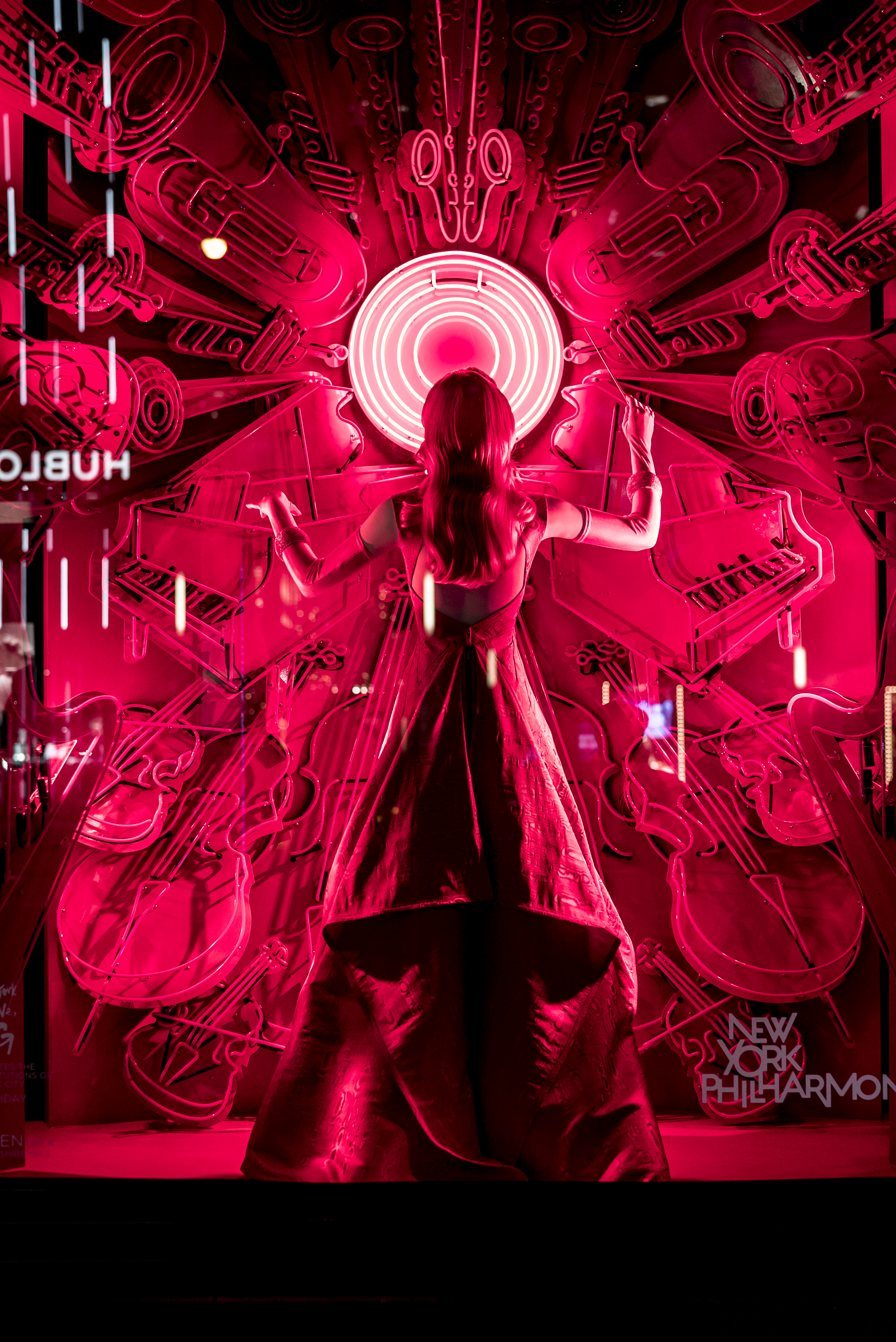
Holiday Windows at Bergdorf (38636621606)

David Hoey is an American window dresser and the senior director for visual presentation at Bergdorf Goodman famed for his work for the aforementioned high end New York City specialty store.

== Biography ==
He started window dressing at Bergdorf Goodman during the summer of 1996 after he was hired by Linda Fargo.

For the holiday windows production at Bergdorfs' he oversees a staff of over one hundred to design the entire spectacular.

== Filmography ==
Hoey appeared in the 2013 biopic about the store Scatter My Ashes at Bergdorf's.

== Bibliography ==
- Hoey, David; Linda, Fargo (2010). Windows at Bergdorf Goodman. Assouline. ISBN 978-1614280828.
