= Hall Madden =

American fashion brand

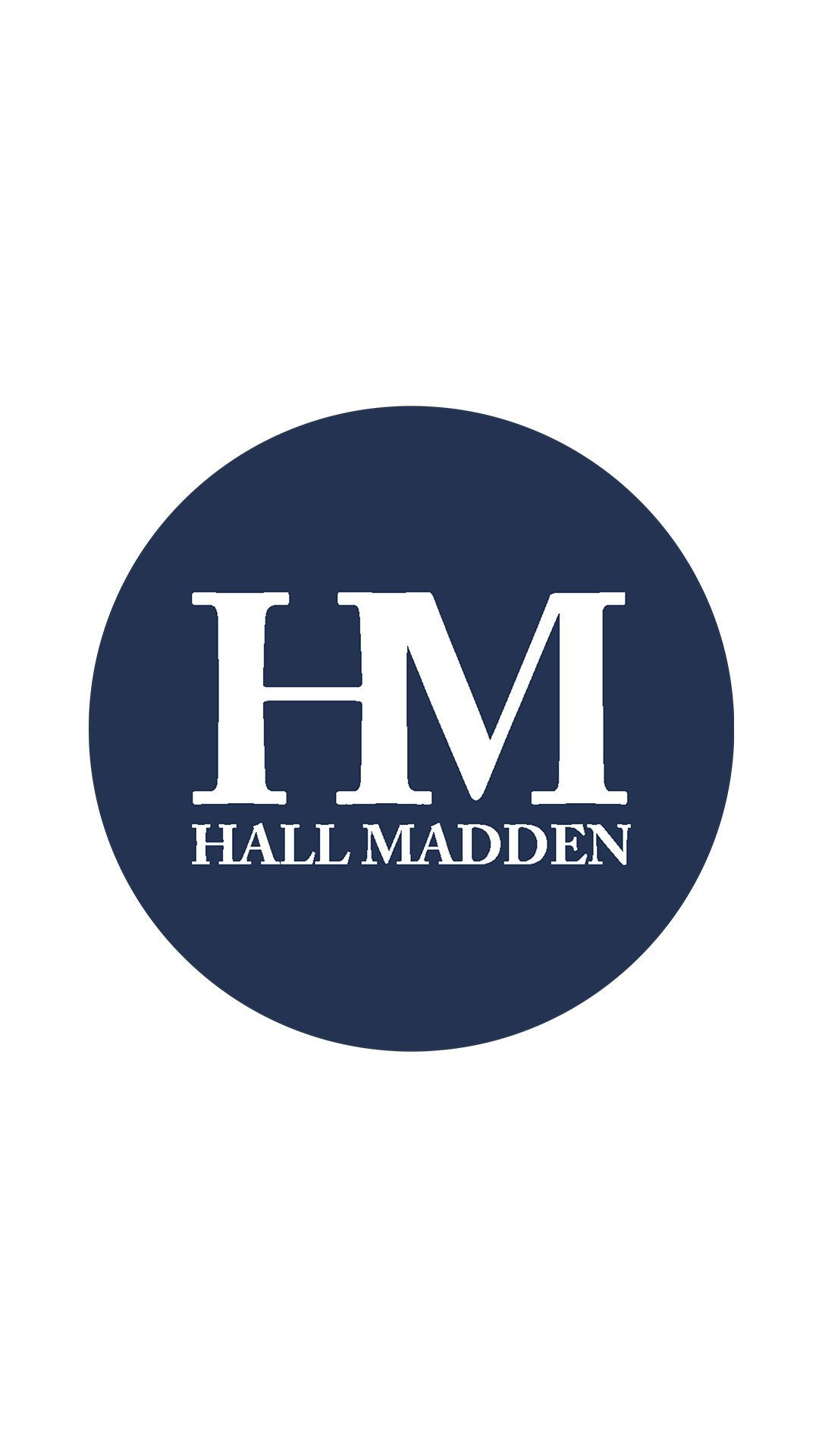
- Formerly: Proper Suit
- Type: Private
- Industry: Luxury tailoring
- Founded: 2009; 17 years ago in United States
- Founders: Richard Hall; McGregor Madden
- Headquarters: Chicago
- Number of locations: 11
- Products: Custom-made suits, tuxedos, blazers, shirts, knitwear, ties, and slacks
- Website: hallmadden.com

Hall Madden is an American men's tailoring company specializing in custom suits, along with other clothing and accessories. The company was described in 2025 as "one of America's fastest-growing luxury tailoring houses."

== History ==
Hall Madden was founded as Proper Suit in 2009 by founders Richard Hall and McGregor Madden, who met in Hong Kong during the early 2000s. They were introduced to low-cost custom clothing while expatriates, eventually moving back to the United States and founding the company. They partnered with a suit manufacturer in China, aiming to remove the pretentiousness from bespoke tailoring and deliver high-quality made-to-measure suits at accessible prices. The company operated virtually and through traveling "trunk shows" which allowed them to measure demand in areas before opening locations, offering fittings in New York, Chicago, San Francisco, Washington DC, Los Angeles, Atlanta, Seattle, and Portland, Oregon.

Hall Madden opened a showroom in Chicago's River North neighborhood in 2013. They launched a subscription shirt service named Hall & Madden the same year. The service delivered three made-to-measure shirts to subscribers manufactured with upscale construction techniques.

== Operations ==
As of 2025, Hall Madden had 11 locations across the United States In addition to custom suits, the company's offerings include tuxedos, blazers, shirts, knitwear, ties and slacks for both genders.
