= Trunk show =

Merchandising event at a temporary location

A trunk show is an event in which vendors present merchandise directly to store personnel or customers at a retail location or another venue such as a hotel room. In many cases it allows store personnel to preview and/or purchase merchandise before it is made available to the public. Typically, clients view the merchandise, place orders, and then wait for the vendor to manufacture and deliver the goods. If the merchandise has a designer, the vendor can have the designer present at the event to add to the customers' experience. Prototypes, samples, remnants and leftover items from runway shows are also sometimes offered at trunk shows. Trunk shows may be open to the general public and advertised in the mass media or may be confined to special customers or those on a mailing list.

The term is derived from the common practice of merchandise being transported to these events in trunks.

== Bridal industry ==
Trunk shows are particularly popular from January to May in the bridal industry because the bride can view more designers' collections than in store.

== Online trunk shows ==
Online or virtual trunk shows are gaining traction in the luxury sector. Bergdorf Goodman held its first virtual trunk show in 2010, and Salvatore Ferragamo launched its first online show in August 2011. Linda Fargo of Bergdorf's labeled virtual trunk shows "the future." Retailers add behind-the-scenes footage and customers make online purchases, usually pre-season and at full price. Many trunk shows online allow pre-order with a deposit.

== Theatrical Performance ==
A trunk show may also refer to a very small theatrical performance. This may be a short skit or sketch with only a few (or even one) actor, where the only props and costumes for the event are contained within a single trunk.
