= My First Kiss (disambiguation) =

"My First Kiss" is a 2010 song by 3OH!3 and Kesha.

My First Kiss may also refer to:

== Film ==
- My First Kiss (film), 2008 film directed by David Wexler

== Songs ==
- "My First Kiss", by Hi-Standard from Love Is a Battlefield, later covered by Andrew W.K.
- "My First Kiss", by Another Bad Creation from It Ain't What U Wear, It's How U Play It
