= Neiman Marcus Group =

American department store holding company

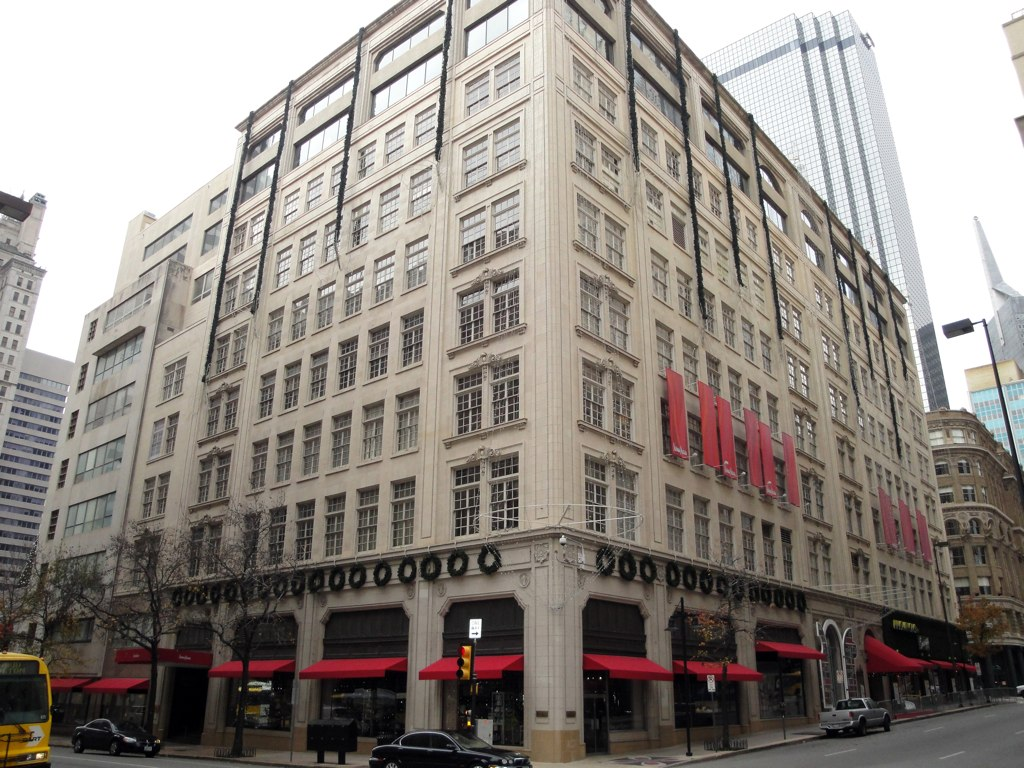
- Neiman Marcus Group headquarters, located within the Neiman Marcus Building (2010)
- Type: Private
- Industry: Retail
- Predecessor: Carter Hawley Hale Stores
- Founded: 1987; 39 years ago
- Defunct: December 23, 2024; 21 months ago
- Fate: Acquired by Hudson's Bay Company, spun-off into Saks Global
- Successor: Saks Global (now Exemplar Luxury Group)
- Headquarters: Dallas, Texas, United States
- Number of locations: 43 (Note: Store count included 36 Neiman Marcus, 5 Neiman Marcus Last Call, and 2 Bergdorf Goodman locations.) (2024)
- Area served: United States
- Key people: Geoffroy van Raemdonck (CEO)
- Revenue: ▲US$4.9 billion (2018)
- Net income: US$251.1 million (2018)
- Total assets: US$7.546 billion (2018)
- Subsidiaries: Bergdorf Goodman; Horchow; Neiman Marcus; Neiman Marcus Last Call
- Website: neimanmarcusgroup.com

Neiman Marcus Group was an American holding company of department stores. It was established after holding company Carter Hawley Hale spun-off several of the department store chains it owned in 1987. At the time of its two-fold acquisition by Toronto-based Hudson's Bay Company and spin-off into Saks Global in 2024, it owned the full-line luxury stores Bergdorf Goodman (based in New York City) and Neiman Marcus (based in Dallas); off-price store Neiman Marcus Last Call; and home furnishings website Horchow.

== Operations in the 20th century ==
Neiman Marcus Group was formed by a spin-off by its parent company Carter Hawley Hale in June 1987. General Cinema (later Harcourt General) originally held 60-percent stake in the new company, and later reduced to 10-percent stake in 1999. The new company held ownership of Dallas-based Neiman Marcus (acquired by Carter Hawley Hale in 1969), New York City-based Bergdorf Goodman (acquired by CHH in 1972), and Contempo Casuals (acquired by CHH in 1979).

== Operations in the 21st century ==
On May 2, 2005, Neiman Marcus Group was the subject of a leveraged buyout (LBO), selling itself to two private equity firms, Texas Pacific Group and Warburg Pincus.

In August 2013, Women's Wear Daily reported Neiman Marcus Group was preparing for an initial public offering of its stock. In October 2013, the Neiman Marcus Group was sold for $6 billion to Ares Management and the Canada Pension Plan Investment Board. In August 2015, the company again announced it was preparing for an initial public offering. In late 2015 Neiman Marcus became a stand-alone company.

In 2018 Geoffroy van Raemdonck replaced Karen Katz as CEO.

In April 2019, Neiman Marcus acquired a minority stake in Fashionphile, an online resale platform for handbags, jewelry and accessories.

In July 2021, mytheresa was spun off and filed for IPO on the NYSE, valuing it at $2.2 billion which increased to $3 billion during the first day of trading.

In June 2022 Neiman Marcus Group reported their highest sales volume in almost half of their stores, and sales of their 20 best-selling brands grew by 70% above pre-COVID levels in 2019. The company has also been attracting younger customers, with the average age falling by seven years from pre-pandemic levels, from the mid-40s to the high-30s.

=== 2020 bankruptcy ===
Neiman Marcus Group, Ltd. LLC and 23 affiliated debtors filed Chapter 11 bankruptcy in the United States District Court for the Southern District of Texas in May 2020. The debtors requested joint administration of the cases under Case No. 20-32519. According to the company's CEO, Geoffroy van Raemdonck, the filing was a direct result of the COVID-19 pandemic in the United States. The company's website, mytheresa.com, was not part of the bankruptcy. At the end of September 2020, Neiman Marcus exited Chapter 11 bankruptcy, and as of 2022 is owned by a consortium of investment firms (Davidson Kempner Capital Management, Sixth Street Partners and Pacific Investment Management).

== Acquisition by Hudson's Bay Company ==
Toronto-based Hudson's Bay Company announced its pending acquisition of the Neiman Marcus Group (NMG) on July 4, 2024. The purchase is valued at $2.65 billion, with financing facilitated by Amazon, Insight Partners, Rhône Capital, and Salesforce. The new Saks Global division will be created to oversee Bergdorf Goodman, Neiman Marcus, and the American operations of the HBC-owned Saks Fifth Avenue. The Neiman Marcus Group stores will also become sister brands to the off-price Saks Off 5th and Canadian full-line Hudson's Bay department stores through this ownership.

On December 23, 2024, Saks Global announced that it had completed its purchase of NMG for $2.7 Billion.

== Nameplates ==
List of nameplates owned by Neiman Marcus Group
Name	Year founded	Year acquired	Year divested	Notes
Bergdorf Goodman	1899	1987	—N/a	
Contempo Casuals	1962	1987	1995	Sold to Wet Seal
Horchow	1971	1988	—N/a	
Mytheresa	1987	2014	2021	Spun-off for IPO
Neiman Marcus	1907	1987	—N/a	
Neiman Marcus Last Call	1988	—N/a	—N/a	
