= Victoria Roberts =

Victoria Roberts may refer to:

- Victoria A. Roberts (born 1951), United States federal judge
- Victoria Roberts (rower) (born 1978), Australian rower (also known as Vicky Roberts)
- Victoria Roberts (cartoonist), cartoonist and performer
