= The Stand Up =

- Directed by: David Wexler
- Written by: David Wexler
- Produced by: David Wexler; Eli Wolstan; Shane Tilston
- Starring: Jonathan Sollis; Margarita Levieva; Aidan Quinn; Arija Bareikis; Justine Cotsonas
- Cinematography: Bart Grieb
- Edited by: Alex Ricciardi
- Music by: Kevin Drew; Frank Bell
- Production company: Cinema 59 Productions
- Distributed by: FilmBuff/Cinetic Media (2012 theatrical)
- Release date: October 22, 2011 (Austin Film Festival)
- Running time: 82 minutes
- Country: United States
- Language: English

The Stand Up is a 2011 American comedy/drama film written and directed by David Wexler and starring Jonathan Sollis, Margarita Levieva, Arija Bareikis, and Aidan Quinn.

== Plot ==
Stand-up comic Zoe Hardwick is desperately in love with his beautiful girlfriend, Miranda (Julia Dennis). When she dies tragically, Zoe is devastated and drops his budding career, moves back home, and pines after his departed love for a year. His father, the principal of an elementary school, decides that one year of moping around the house is enough and forces Zoe to take a job teaching kindergarten, Zoe finds himself standing before a very different demographic. The innocent insights of the children help Zoe in finally healing. He meets fellow kindergarten teacher, Veronica (Margarita Levieva) and a new love is kindled.

== Cast ==
- Jonathan Sollis as Zoe Hardwick
- Margarita Levieva as Veronica
- Aidan Quinn as Sandy Hardwick
- Arija Bareikis as Mrs. Rundgren
- Justine Cotsonas as Rosaline
- Jonathan Reed Wexler as Clem
- Julia Dennis as Miranda
- Quinn Broggy as Ethan
- Jennifer Mudge as Mrs. Schumacher
- Bryanna Adames as Rachel
- Duncan Bindbeutel as Comedy Club MC
- Gianni Echeverria as Sasha
- Ashley Gerasimovich as Claire
- Ryan Hoffman as Comic
- Leonardo Larocca as Dominick
- William Liao as Clark
- Christopher Martinez as Juan
- Jackson Nicoll as Sebastian
- Ursula Parker as Yvonne
- Janet Passanante as DJ
- Jake Ryan as Trevor
- Adam Smith Jr. as Weird Teacher
- Joseph Theisen as Luke

== Release ==
The film debuted October 22, 2011 at the Austin Film Festival and began a limited theatrical release September 14, 2012.

== Critical reception ==
The film received generally negative reviews: The Village Voice offered "for a film about a stand-up comedian to be mirthless is dispiriting" and expanded that The Stand Up did not compensate for its absence of humor with use of any legitimate drama. While the premise of a bereaved comedian dealing with the tragic death of a loved one had potential for drama and angst, the protagonist's "path to healing, though, is made Easy-Bake simple" by director David Wexler, whose use of father-finding-unhappy-son the perfect job where he then meets "perfect-match Veronica (Margarita Levieva)", then allows the protagonist of Zoe to become a "passive participant in his own healing, which Wexler leaves so uncomplicated that the story simply coasts along on a smooth path to happily ever after." It was concluded, "regrettably, it’s impossible for the film or its star to do little more than recall other recent comedies and performers: the superior School of Rock for one and, via the portly Sollis’s eerily similar voice, Jonah Hill."

The Hollywood Reporter felt it was an "unconvincing indie effort" whose premise and role were more suitable as vehicles for Jack Black or Seth Rogen. In a project where a "depressed comedian becomes an unlikely kindergarten teacher", it was felt that despite its potential, "the film never manages to find a consistent footing, shifting uneasily in tone and haltingly proceeding with its formulaic plotting." Further, for a stand-up comic, the character of Zoe Hardwick "proves to be remarkably unfunny, and Sollis lacks the necessary charisma to make us fully care about his undeveloped character." And while praising Margarita Levieva as a highly appealing love interest, "she’s unable to overcome the sheer implausibility of her character’s falling in love with the charmless Zoe." Praise went to Aidan Quinn's role as Zoe's father for giving "a drolly humorous performance that enlivens every scene in which he appears. While it’s hard to imagine how exactly this talented veteran actor wound up appearing in this low-budget affair, moviegoers are not likely to look a gift horse in the mouth."

The New York Times wrote that writer/director David Wexler was to be commended for taking viewers where might be expected in an "oaf-in-kiddieland story", but also offered it was "too bad that he didn’t bring a little more creativity to the predictable tale he does fashion". Granting that the film had Kindergarten Cop and School of Rock moments" and Jonathan Sollis having a physique similar to Jack Black, rather than being a comedy, "the focus soon shifts to finding Zoe a rebound romance. Conveniently, a good-looking fellow teacher (Margarita Levieva) is available. (For those keeping score, that’s two hot women inexplicably attracted to a moping schlump.)" It was offered that Levieva shows her range and "is quite watchable" but "Sollis can’t always handle the naturalistic acting style Mr. Wexler demands". It was concluded that "the main shortcoming of this film is that the story Mr. Wexler finally decides to tell is utterly ordinary."

Conversely, CultureMap Austin spoke toward the film's debut at the Austin Film Festival and offered that it might have been better named "The Kindergarten Teacher", as "stand up comedy bookends the film but doesn't really play an important symbolic or therapeutic role". It was felt that while the premise of a stand-up comic dealing with the death of a girlfriend by taking a job as a kindergarten teacher "sounds like something from a wacky Jonah Hill comedy," the film managed to execute it "with restraint and complexity in a surprising way". It was also offered that Margarita Levieva's role of a fellow teacher and sympathetic new love interest allowed her to "elevate the character well out of Manic Pixie Dream Girl Territory".
