= Joshua Taylor =

American actor

- Occupations: Actor, film director and film producer
- Years active: Since 1997

Joshua Taylor is a film and television actor. He is also a film director and film producer.

Taylor is perhaps best known for his appearance as Blueberry Pirate in the space Western musical film The American Astronaut (2001).

== Career ==
In addition to his appearance in The American Astronaut, Taylor has appeared in at least three other films and one television production. He also directed the documentary film Dita and the Family Business (2001) and acted as a producer on The American Astronaut.

== Filmography ==
Film
Year	Title	Genre	Role	Notes
1997	Ties to Rachel	drama	Haz-Mat Man	
1998	Godzilla	action-thriller, science-fiction horror	Spotter	
2001	The American Astronaut	space Western, musical-comedy	Blueberry Pirate	also a producer
2009	Stingray Sam	space Western, musical-comedy	Fredward	

Television
Year	Title	Genre	Episode	Role	Notes
2003	McLeod's Daughters	drama series	"Put to the Test"	Johnno	
2005	All Saints	drama series	"Begging For It"	Von (fill-in)	

Directing
Year	Title	Genre	Notes
2001	Dita and the Family Business	Documentary film	

Producer
Year	Title	Genre	Role	Notes
2001	The American Astronaut	space Western, musical-comedy	the Blueberry Pirate	also an acting role
