= Ira Neimark =

American author and retail executive (1921 – 2019)

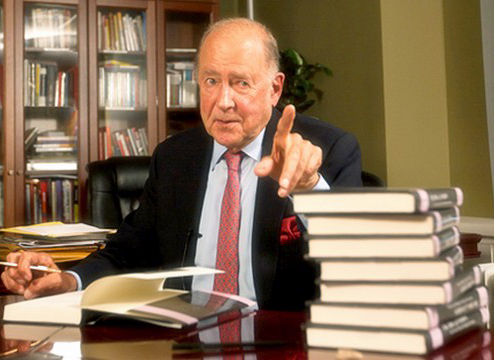
- Ira Neimark in 2011 at a book party for 'The Rise of Fashion'
- Born: December 12, 1921; New York City, U.S.
- Died: April 18, 2019 (aged 97); Harrison, New York, U.S.
- Education: Columbia Business School
- Occupation: Businessman
- Spouse: Jacqueline R. Myers (m. 1953)
- Children: 2

Ira Neimark (December 12, 1921 – April 18, 2019) was an American author, lecturer, and retail executive. He was chairman and CEO of Bergdorf Goodman from 1975 to 1992.

During his tenure at Bergdorf Goodman, along with Aaron Elisha, was introducing French haute couture to New York, collaborating with designers such as Yves Saint Laurent, Hubert de Givenchy, and Christian Dior. This introduction contributed to a period of growth for Bergdorf Goodman.

Neimark oversaw the expansion of the women's store. In 1991, he led the opening ceremony for the Bergdorf Goodman Men's Store across the street from the primary location in New York City.

== Early life ==
Neimark was born on December 12, 1921, in Brooklyn, New York, to attorney Eugene G. Neimark and Lillian (Braude) Neimark. After his father's death in late 1938, 16-year-old Neimark sought employment and was hired by Bonwit Teller for a seasonal position as a pageboy in the store's 721 Club for Men, which featured a curated selection of the retailer's items.

Following the 1938 Christmas season, he continued working at Bonwit Teller, transitioning to a doorboy role. In 1940, the store president promoted him to an office boy, and in 1941 promoted to stock boy.

== Retail career ==
After his service in WWII, Neimark returned to Bonwit Teller, where he worked as manager of Merchandise Control before being promoted to assistant to the president. He later became a blouse buyer before transitioning to McCreery's in New York in 1950. In 1951, he joined Gladdings in Providence, Rhode Island, as a divisional merchandise manager.

In 1959, Neimark moved to G. Fox & Co. in Hartford, Connecticut, as an assistant to the general merchandise manager. Soon after G. Fox's owner, Beatrice Fox Auerbach, appointed him president of Brown Thompson, an affiliated store. In 1967, he returned to G. Fox & Co. as vice president and general merchandise manager. Following Auerbach's death, Neimark transitioned to B. Altman and Company, located at Fifth Avenue and 34th Street in New York, where he became executive vice president and general merchandise manager in 1970. In 1975, he succeeded Andrew Goodman as the head of Bergdorf Goodman, becoming the first non-family member to lead the company since its founding in 1899.

Neimark aimed to revitalize the store, shifting its image from what he described as "old, dull, expensive, and intimidating" to "young, exciting, expensive, and intimidating". To achieve this, he recruited Dawn Mello to lead the store's fashion office.

According to The Robin Report, Neimark played a pivotal role in transforming Bergdorf Goodman's image, shifting it from a store catering predominantly to an older, more traditional clientele to one that became a global leader in contemporary luxury and fashion.

He implemented the "Italian Strategy", securing partnerships with designers worldwide. The first partnership was established with Fendi.

In 1981, the store organized a Fendi fur show at the Pulitzer Fountain.

Bergdorf Goodman hosted Azzedine Alaïa's first fashion show in New York City in 1982, contributing to the establishment of his label in the U.S. market. Additionally, Donna Karan and Michael Kors gained career recognition through fashion shows at Bergdorf Goodman.

== Professional honors ==
Neimark was honored by the governments of Italy and France, receiving the titles of Cavaliere della Repubblica and Chevalier of the Order of Arts and Letters, respectively. Additionally, he was awarded the Medal of the City of Paris for of his contributions to fashion and retail.

He also was a director emeritus of Hermès of Paris and a director of The Fashion Institute of Technology Foundation.

== Personal life ==
While working at Gladdings in Providence, Rhode Island, Neimark began dating Jackie Myers, the handbag buyer for T.W. Rounds specializing in prestige leather goods. She was the daughter of Harry M. and Yetta Goodman Myers, the owners of T.W. Rounds.

Neimark and Myers married on March 10, 1953, and had two daughters.

Neimark died on April 18, 2019, at his home in Harrison, New York.
