= Betty Halbreich =

American fashion personality (1927–2024)

- Born: Betty Ann Samuels; November 17, 1927; Chicago, Illinois, U.S.
- Died: August 24, 2024 (aged 96); New York City, New York, U.S.
- Occupations: Personal shopper; stylist; writer
- Spouse: Sonny Halbreich (m. 1947; died 2004)
- Children: 2; including Kathy

Betty Ann Halbreich (German pronunciation: [ˈhalbraɪç]; née Samuels; November 17, 1927 – August 24, 2024) was an American personal shopper, stylist, and author known for her career at the New York luxury department store Bergdorf Goodman, where she served as Director of Solutions. Her 2015 memoir, titled I'll Drink to That: A Life in Style, with a Twist, was featured on The New York Times Best Seller list.

== Early life ==
Halbreich was born Betty Ann Samuels in Chicago on November 17, 1927, to Morton Samuels and Carol Freshman, who divorced shortly after her birth. Her mother married Harry Stoll, a businessman, and she grew up in an affluent Jewish neighborhood in the South Side of Chicago. Her stepfather ran department stores and her mother owned a bookstore.

Her family were secular German Jews who also celebrated Christmas. Her parents employed many servants at their Chicago home, including European cooks and a nursemaid. Originally she wanted to be a painter or cartoonist, and she enrolled at the Art Institute of Chicago. She also studied at Colorado College. Around this time, while vacationing in Miami Beach, she met Sonny Halbreich, the son of a wealthy hotel developer who owned Uwana Wash Frocks, a housecoat and bathrobe manufacturing company. They married in 1947 and moved to New York, where she lived the life of a Manhattan socialite.

== Career ==
Halbreich's marriage was unhappy, due to her husband's drinking and frequent affairs. She attempted suicide and was admitted to a mental institution. Upon recovery, she began seeking employment, and worked in a series of designer showrooms on Seventh Avenue and later for Chester Weinberg and Geoffrey Beene before being hired at Bergdorf Goodman in 1976 as a sales associate. On her suggestion, the store created a personal shopping office for Halbreich. Her first client was the socialite Babe Paley. In her capacity as the director of solutions at Bergdorf's, Halbreich has served celebrity clients including Hollywood personalities, socialites, and politicians such as Al Gore, Liza Minnelli, and Meryl Streep. She assisted in the styling for the cast of Sex and the City and Gossip Girl, styled casts for Broadway shows, worked as a style consultant for Woody Allen films, collaborated with costume designers Santo Loquasto and Jeffrey Kurland, and worked with William Ivey Long, Ann Roth, and Jane Greenwood.

In 1997 she wrote the memoir Secrets of a Fashion Therapist. In 2015 she published her second memoir, entitled I'll Drink to That: A Life in Style, with a Twist. A third book of her writings, No One Has Seen It All, was released in April 2025 with a foreword by the writer Lena Dunham.

In 2013 she was featured in the documentary Scatter My Ashes at Bergdorf's, which raised her public profile. She remained a salaried employee of Bergdorf Goodman until her death.

== Personal life ==
Halbreich and her husband had two children, Kathy Halbreich and John Halbreich. Though Betty and Sonny Halbreich separated after two decades of marriage, they never divorced, and were legally married until his death in 2004. Beginning in her sixties, she was in a long term relationship with Jim Dipple.

The year that Halbreich and her husband married, they moved into an apartment on Park Avenue on the Upper East Side of Manhattan, which would be her home for the rest of her life. She died from cancer at a hospital in Manhattan on August 24, 2024, at the age of 96.
