= Linda Fargo =

American fashion business executive (born 1957)

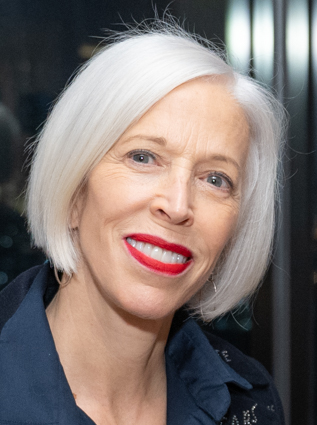
Linda Fargo in 2024

Linda Fargo is an American fashion business executive. Since 2006, she has served as the senior vice president of the fashion office and as the director of women's fashion and store presentation for the Bergdorf Goodman department store in New York City.

== Early life and education ==
Born in 1957, Fargo grew up in the suburbs of Milwaukee and received her Bachelor of Fine Arts degree from the University of Wisconsin–Madison. After her move to New York, she started as a window dresser at Macy's, eventually becoming the visual director.

== Career ==
Fargo joined Bergdorf Goodman as the display director in June 1996. Fargo was one of eighteen Manhattan window-display designers that collaborated on the Cooper Hewitt, Smithsonian Design Museum's The Window Show in May 1999. That year she was both vice president for visual presentations and director of visual merchandising. She and Robert Burke designed the 2001 Whitney Museum of American Art's annual gala called Nightclub as Monument, inspired on New York café society and the museum's retrospective of Edward Steichen's photographic works from the 1920s and 1930s.

After the September 11 attacks, Fargo and her team "completely readjusted" their display plans, which were originally going to be "an homage to the arts". Instead, each of the Bergdorf Goodman Building's windows on Fifth Avenue were decorated in a separate value or virtue, while the 57th Street windows were a black-and-white collage of New York landmarks, and the 58th Street windows were centered around children. One of the Fifth Avenue windows that year was highlighted by The New York Times as capturing the transition between "traditional sparkles and reds to a quieter, neutral wheat and organic palette" in holiday tastes. Assouline published Dreams Through the Glass: Windows from Bergdorf Goodman, written by Fargo herself, the $50 book was a retrospective of her displays, which Harper's Bazaar called "designs [which] prove that at its most sublime, window dressing is an art form."

In March 2017, Fargo opened the Linda's shop on the fourth floor of the Bergdorf Goodman Building. At Bergdorf, she works with David Hoey, the present window dresser and senior director for visual presentation, with whom she creates "about 450 windows a year."

== In media ==
At a Cystic Fibrosis Foundation fundraiser held at Macy's in 1985, Fargo wore "lace gloves and a black dress borrowed from Kim Stoddard," which The New York Times described as "very new wave".

In 2013 she was featured in the documentary Scatter My Ashes at Bergdorf's (the title lifted from the caption of a 1990 Victoria Roberts cartoon that appeared in pages of The New Yorker). Variety said in its review of the film that Fargo "effortlessly commands centerstage for long stretches as she vets new designers' collections for kindly 'maybe later' rejection or 'welcome to the family' acceptance."

== Bibliography ==
- Hoey, David; Linda, Fargo (2010). Windows at Bergdorf Goodman. Assouline. ISBN 978-1614280828.
