= Dita and the Family Business =

2001 film by Joshua Taylor and Ferne Pearlstein

- Directed by: Joshua Taylor; Ferne Pearlstein
- Produced by: Joshua Taylor
- Starring: Nena Manach Goodman; Vivien Malloy; Mary Ann Quinson; Edwin Andrew Goodman; Pamela Goodman Lichty
- Release date: March 10, 2001 (U.S.)
- Running time: 58 minutes
- Country: United States
- Language: English

Dita and the Family Business is a 2001 documentary film directed by Joshua Taylor and Ferne Pearlstein about Taylor's own family, who owned the New York City department store Bergdorf Goodman. It was first released at the 2001 San Diego Latino Film Festival.

== See also ==
- Scatter My Ashes at Bergdorf's, a 2013 documentary film about the store
