= Arija Bareikis =

American actress (born 1966)

- Born: Arija Allison Bareikis; July 21, 1966 (age 60)
- Education: Stanford University
- Occupation: Actress
- Years active: 1992–present

Arija Allison Bareikis (July 21, 1966) is an American actress. She is best known for her role as Officer Chickie Brown in the TV crime drama Southland. She is also known for the films Deuce Bigalow: Male Gigolo and The Purge.

== Early life and education ==
Bareikis's first name and surname are Lithuanian. She is one of two daughters born to Dr. and Mrs. Robert Paul Bareikis. She graduated from Stanford University in 1987.

== Career ==
Bareikis appeared alongside Rob Schneider as Kate in Deuce Bigalow: Male Gigolo (1999) and played LAPD police officer Chickie Brown in the police drama series Southland for its first three seasons. As of May 2018, Bareikis' most recent screen role was a 2016 episode of the television series Power, as MJ.

== Filmography ==
Film
Year	Film	Role	Other notes
1993	Celestial Navigation	Pamela	Short film
1994	Twisted Tales	Tracey	Segment: "Hungry Like A…Bat?"
1997	Ties to Rachel	Rachel	
1997	The Myth of Fingerprints	Daphne	
1998	Pants on Fire	Nicki	
1998	The Naked Man	Kim Bliss	
1999	30 Days	Sarah Meyers	
1999	Snow Falling on Cedars	Susan Marie Heine	
1999	Deuce Bigalow: Male Gigolo	Kate	
2004	Melinda and Melinda	Sally Oliver	
2005	Deuce Bigalow: European Gigolo	Kate Bigalow	Uncredited
2005	Dealbreaker	Fran	Short film
2007	No Reservations	Christine	
2007	Leaving Gussie	Thyme	Short film
2007	Before the Devil Knows You're Dead	Katherine	
2009	Tenderness	Marsha	
2009	Frame of Mind	Jennifer Secca	
2011	The Stand Up	Mrs. Rundgren	
2013	The Purge	Mrs. Grace Sanchez	
2016	Tao of Surfing	Megan	
2018	The Witch in the Window	Beverly	
Television
Year	Title	Role	Notes
1996	One Life to Live	Emily di Mauro	Recurring character
1997	Law & Order	Kim Triandos	Episode: "Matrimony"
1999–2000	Oz	Tricia Ross	Episodes: "The Truth and Nothing But…", "Napoleon's Boney Parts", "Unnatural Disasters", "U.S. Male", "Obituaries", and "The Bill of Wrongs"
2002	The American Embassy	Emma Brody	Episodes: "Walking on the Moon", "Agent Provocateur", "Pilot", "China Cup", "Driven", and "Long Live the King"
2002	Without a Trace	Maggie Cartwright	Episode: "Pilot"
2003	A Painted House	Kathleen Chandler	Hallmark Television movie
2004	Crossing Jordan	Detective Annie Capra	Episodes: "Oh, Brother Where Art Thou?", "Dead in the Water", "Missing Pieces", "Till Death Do Us Part", and "Devil May Care"
2005	Grey's Anatomy	Savannah	Episode: "Let It Be"
2005–2009	Law & Order: Criminal Intent	Helen Bramer / Nurse Gina Lowe	Episodes: "Stress Position" and "Astoria Helen"
2006	A.K.A.	Vanessa	Television movie
2011	Royal Pains	Natalie's Mother	Episode: "A History of Violins"
2009–2011	Southland	Police Officer III Chickie Brown	Lead Character: 19 episodes
2016	Power	MJ Hazen / MJ	Episodes: "Don't Go", "Trust Me", and "In My Best Interest"
2017	Bull	Moira Dickerson	Episode: "Make Me"
