= David Wexler (director) =

American film director

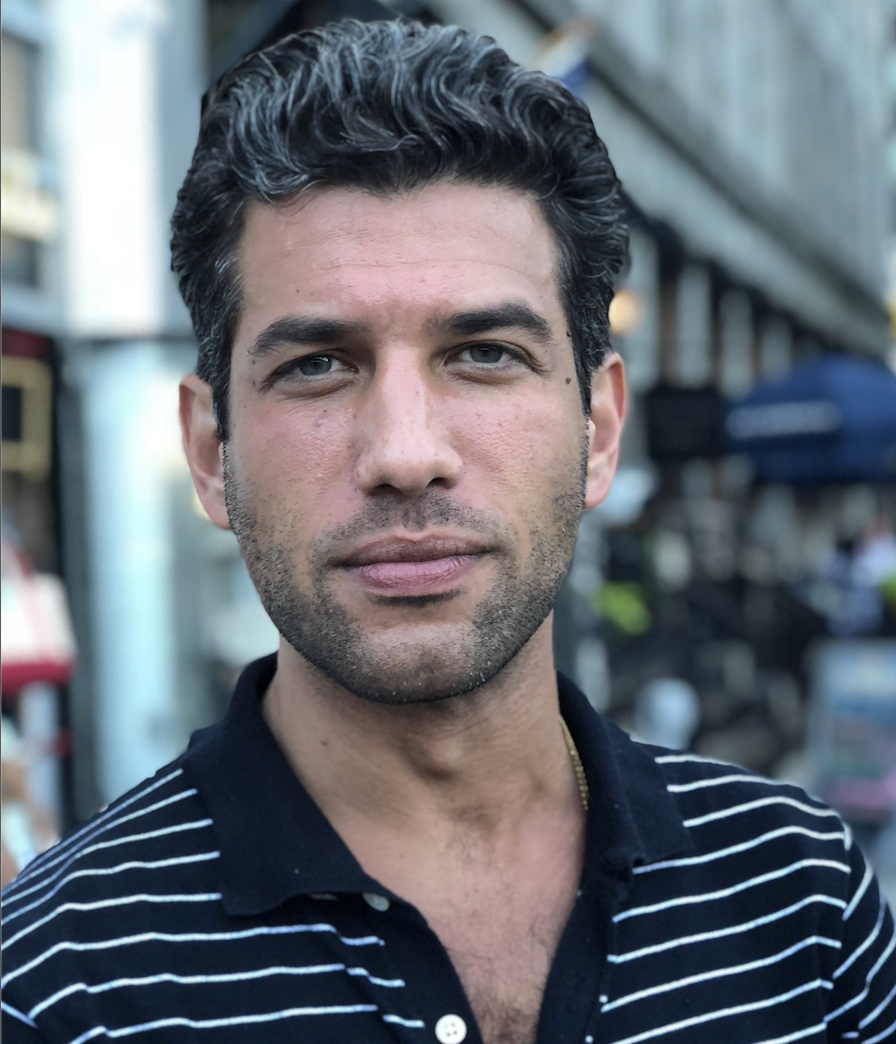
- Born: 10 January 1983 (age 43); New York City, New York, U.S.
- Education: University of Wisconsin-Madison
- Occupations: Director, writer, producer, actor

David Wexler is an American film director, screenwriter, film producer, and toy designer. Wexler is a New York City native and a graduate of the University of Wisconsin-Madison, where he majored in communication arts.

Prior to his feature films (Evil Weed, The Stand Up, Anchors, Turtle Island, Last Supper, Vigilante, Deep Cuts, Third Eye Blind Live at Red Rocks, and Cap City), Wexler created and produced the reality show College Life for MTV.

Wexler has written and directed many commercials and corporate videos. He worked with Curtis Sliwa and the Guardian Angels to create a comic book and a handbook, as well as a clothing line available at Barking Irons.

Wexler founded the production company Cinema 59 Productions in 2006. Cinema 59 often works with Creative Diversions, a toy and game company to create 360 degree entertainment.

Wexler's film Motorcycle Drive By about Third Eye Blind was an official selection of the 2020 Tribeca Film Festival. In 2021 his game Fish Club was nominated for the Toy Of The Year Award. His film Disintegration Loops was an official selection of the 2021 SXSW Film Festival.

Wexler directed two music videos (lead single Box of Bones, and Goodbye to the Days of Ladies and Gentlemen) for Third Eye Blind's seventh studio album Our Bande Apart. He also served as Art Director for the album package, as well as their Unplugged album.

He directed the film Third Eye Blind Live at Red Rocks, released through Sony Music. His ninth feature, Cap City, was co-written with Max Allan Collins and based on a novella by Mickey Spillane.

Wexler was featured on Season 3 of History Channel’s “The Toys That Built America.”

Wexler’s line of 8 “New Classic” games, under the brand Wexler Studios, was released through Galison.

His game Connect 4 Frenzy was nominated for Game of the Year, earning him his second TOTY nomination.

== Filmography (as writer, director) ==
- American Gothic (2007)
- My First Kiss (2008)
- Evil Weed (2009)
- The Stand Up (2010)
- Anchors (2012)
- Turtle Island (2012)
- Last Supper (2018)
- Vigilante: The Incredible True Story of Curtis Sliwa and the Guardian Angels (2018)
- Motorcycle Drive By (2020)
- Disintegration Loops (2021)
- Deep Cuts (2023)
- Third Eye Blind Live at Red Rocks (2024)
- Cap City (2025)

== Filmography (as actor) ==
- Turtle Island (2012)
- I'm Not Here (2017)
- Cap City (2025)

== Television (as creator/producer) ==
- College Life (2009)

== Web Series (as creator/producer) ==
- Movie Life (2009)
