= Ties to Rachel =

- Directed by: Jon Resnik
- Written by: Jon Resnik
- Produced by: Jon Resnik
- Starring: Joanna Adler; Arija Bareikis
- Release date: 1997
- Country: United States
- Language: English

Ties to Rachel is a 1997 American drama film directed, written and produced by Jon Resnik and starring Joanna Adler and Arija Bareikis.

== Cast ==
- Joanna Adler
- Arija Bareikis
- Arthur Bridgers
- George Dickerson
- Tim Hopper
- Ellen Parker
- Adrian Pasdar
- Beverly Pereira
- Molly Price
- Bill Raymond
- Joshua Taylor
