= Jennifer Fisher (designer) =

American jewelry designer

- Born: Santa Barbara, California
- Education: University of Southern California
- Occupation: Jewelry designer
- Notable work: Fine Jewelry Collection, Brass Collection
- Spouse: Kevin Fisher (m. 2001)
- Children: 2

Jennifer Fisher (born Santa Barbara, California) is an American jewelry designer based in New York City. She designs jewelry for two of her own lines: the Fine Jewelry Collection and Brass Collection.

== Early career ==
Fisher graduated from the University of Southern California with a bachelor's degree in Business Marketing and a minor in Fine Arts. After graduating in 1993, she began her career in fashion, working in both Los Angeles and New York as a wardrobe stylist for feature films, television shows, and commercials.

== Career ==
After college and before she gained any experience in the jewelry business, Fisher worked as a wardrobe stylist for national ad campaigns like Budweiser and American Express.

When her first child was born, Fisher wanted a receiving gift with single letters of the baby´s name. When she couldn´t find it, she designed a necklace, a dog tag charm with the name stamped on the front in her own, personal style and began to wear it. When friends, family, and colleagues began to request that she design one for them, her business slowly started. After Uma Thurman wore Fishers jewelry on the cover of Glamour Magazine, her business was born.

She began with a website with five products and became one of the first brands sold online.

In May 2014, Fisher opened her flagship store on New York City’s lower Fifth Avenue.

== Awards ==
In 2012, Fisher was a top ten finalist in the Council of Fashion Designers of America (CFDA) Vogue Fashion Fund Competition. She also received the Influencer Award at the 2006 Accessories Council Excellence Awards.

== Personal life ==
In 2001, Fisher married Kevin Fisher. The couple lives in New York City with their two children.
