= Exemplar Luxury Group =

American holding company

Exemplar Luxury Group LLC
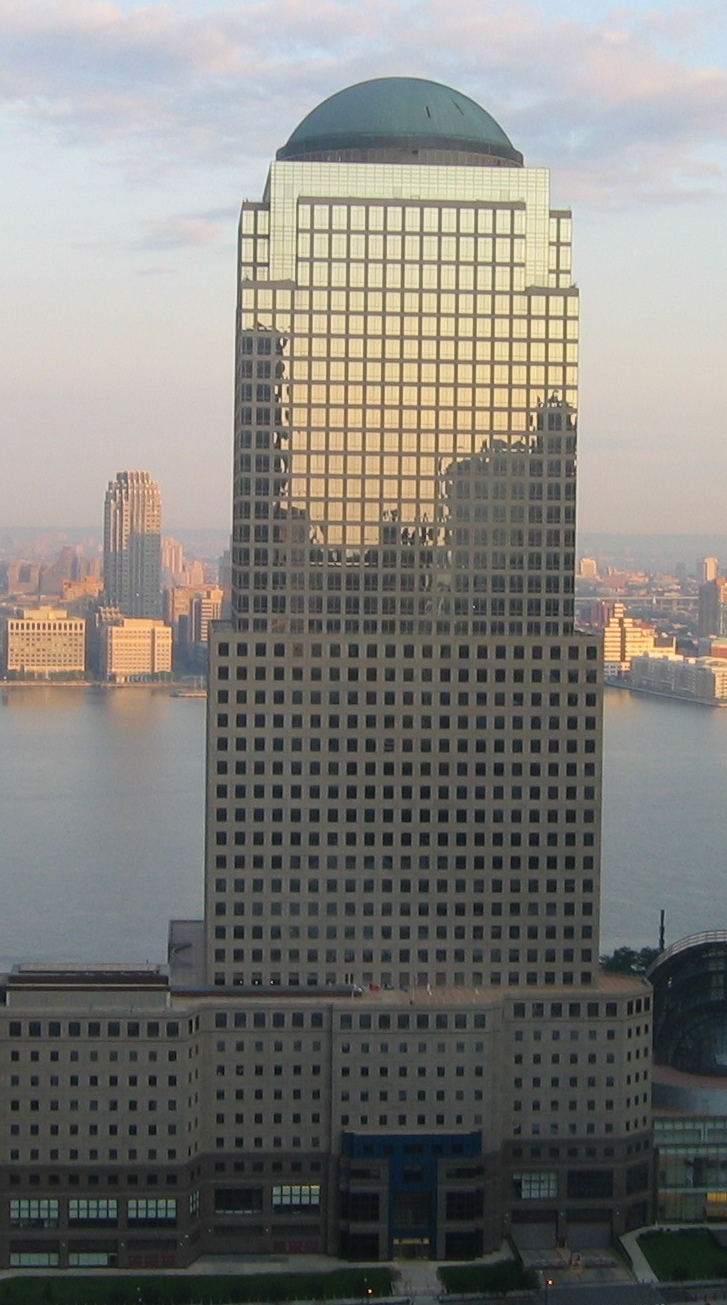
- Exterior of the headquarters at 225 Liberty Street in Lower Manhattan
- Formerly: Saks Global Holdings LLC
- Type: Private
- Industry: Retail
- Genre: Department stores
- Predecessor: Hudson's Bay Company; Neiman Marcus Group
- Founded: November 15, 2024; 23 months ago (Note: The legal entity was founded on March 9, 2020, however, it was renamed Saks Global and began business on November 15, 2024.)
- Headquarters: New York City, New York, United States
- Area served: United States
- Key people: Geoffroy van Raemdonck (CEO)
- Subsidiaries: Bergdorf Goodman; Neiman Marcus; Saks Fifth Avenue; Saks Off 5th
- Website: exemplarluxurygroup.com

Exemplar Luxury Group LLC, formerly Saks Global Holdings LLC until June 2026, is an American holding company of department stores and commercial property. It owns the full-line luxury stores Bergdorf Goodman, Neiman Marcus and Saks Fifth Avenue, and off-price stores Saks Off 5th. Saks Global was formed after the American assets of Canadian holding company Hudson's Bay Company were spun-off in November 2024, and expanded with the acquisition of the Neiman Marcus Group in December 2024.

In January 2026, Saks Global filed for chapter 11 bankruptcy protection after accumulating a $4.7 billion debt from its Neiman Marcus acquisition, amid a trend of American shoppers choosing experiential luxury and directly operated monobrand luxury stores. The company emerged from bankruptcy six months later with a new name.

== History ==
Saks Global was created in 2024 after the Canadian Hudson's Bay Company (HBC) purchased the American Neiman Marcus Group (NMG). The acquisition was finalized in December 2024 and the purchase cost $2.7 billion. The acquisition brought together Bergdorf Goodman, Neiman Marcus, Saks Fifth Avenue and Saks Off 5th.

The purchase was supported with financing from Amazon ("to innovate on behalf of customers and brand partners"), Authentic Brands Group, G-III Apparel Group and Salesforce. In an interview with Vogue Business, Metrick (then-CEO of Saks Global Operating Group) said that it was only the beginning of the group's ambitions and that they were thinking of what the entity might look like internationally. The company is divided into four business units: Saks Global Operating Group, Saks Global Properties & Investments, Bergdorf Goodman, and Authentic Luxury Group.

Saks stores in Canada were licensed by Saks Global and operated by HBC which used to be the parent company of the American locations as well until 2024. The Canadian locations closed permanently alongside the full-line Hudson's Bay stores with the liquidation of HBC in 2025.

In May 2025, Saks Global's then-executive chairman Richard Baker planned to remove 500 to 600 brands from the portfolio. Saks Fifth Avenue closed its Union Square, San Francisco location, citing the nearby Neiman Marcus. Industry sources reported that Costco warehouse club would be carrying Saks Fifth Avenue apparel in the coming months.

=== Financial difficulties and bankruptcy ===
In May 2025, Saks Global was seeking additional capital to sustain its finances while its bondholders, who faced almost $1 billion in losses, began to question if they'll receive a single interest payment. Industry experts reported that a successful 2025 holiday season would be crucial for the company. As of August some vendors reported no progress.

In August 2025, Saks Global completed a debt restructuring that would allow for the company to raise up to $600 million in secured financing and a $2.2 billion exchange in senior secured notes. On September 21, Saks Global announced that it was in early negotiations to sell a 49% minority stake of its Bergdorf Goodman brand for $1 billion in an effort to further reduce debt. Despite these attempts for a turnaround, by October 2025, Saks Global had reported a significant revenue loss in Q2 2025, losing more than 13% of revenue to $1.6 billion, down from over $2 billion in Q2 2024. On November 13, Saks Global announced the closure of 9 underperforming Saks OFF 5TH locations by January 2026 in an effort to better optimize its store fleet.

On December 23, Saks Global sold its 184,000-square-foot Neiman Marcus flagship in Beverly Hills to Ashkenazy Acquisition Corp., aiming to free up capital to pay down debt and reinvest in its core business. On December 31, Saks Global skipped its $100 million debt payment with its bondholders. In January 2026, new senior bonds issued in summer 2025 were trading below 30 cents on the dollar. On January 2, 2026, Metrick stepped down as CEO after working various roles at Saks since 1995.

On January 13, 2026, Saks Global filed for Chapter 11 bankruptcy protection in the United States District Court for the Southern District of Texas in the face of fiercer competition and approximately $2.65 billion debt from its 2024 acquisition of Neiman Marcus. A financing packaging deal of $1.75 billion proposed by Pentwater Capital Management and Bracebridge Capital, if approved by the judge, would allow the company to go through the bankruptcy process. As debt restructuring occurs, the company said that stores would remain open, customer programs will be honored, and suppliers and employees would be paid.

Real estate mogul Richard Baker left Saks Global entirely just two weeks after being appointed CEO to replace Marc Metrick. Baker was the architect of the $2.7B acquisition of Neiman Marcus finalized in 2024. Also said to be leaving were president Ian Putnam and the rest of Baker's group. On January 14, 2026, Geoffroy van Raemdonck, who oversaw Neiman Marcus Group's emergence from bankruptcy in 2020, was appointed CEO of Saks Global as part of the Chapter 11 filing.

On January 15, 2026, U.S. Bankruptcy Judge Alfredo Perez approved the retailer's $1.75 billion debtor-in-possession loan over the objections of Amazon. Amazon, which owns just over a 23% stake in Saks Global, stated that its investment is "now presumptively worthless" after it claimed that Saks Global continuously failed to meet its budgets, burned through hundreds of millions of dollars in less than a year, and ran up additional hundreds of millions of dollars in unpaid invoices owed to its retail partners. Saks owed $136 million to Chanel, nearly $60 million to Kering, $26 million to LVMH, $22.2 million to Beiersdorf, $16 million to The Estée Lauder Companies Inc., and $12.1 million to Puig. Amazon attorney Caroline Reckler said at a bankruptcy hearing she has "little to no confidence" that Saks can successfully emerge from bankruptcy. Amazon, Zegna, LVMH, Chanel, Kering, Brookfield Properties Retail, and a labor union representing Saks store workers will serve on a 10-member panel of unsecured creditors set up by the U.S. Trustee's Office in the Department of Justice. In the months leading up to the bankruptcy, Bloomingdale's and Nordstrom gained market share from Saks Global's subsidiaries.

On January 23, Simon Property Group, the largest operator of shopping malls in the United States, sought to terminate two leases owned by Saks Global, claiming that the company owes nearly $7 million in unpaid rent. That same day, the company won court approval to hire a liquidator to sell its remaining inventory for Saks OFF 5TH Digital, the e-commerce website managed by Saks OFF 5TH. The liquidation sale does not include merchandise from any of Saks Global's physical stores, nor does it include merchandise for the websites of Saks Fifth Avenue, Neiman Marcus, Bergdorf Goodman, or Horchow.

On January 29, Saks Global announced the permanent closure of 57 Saks OFF 5TH and all 5 remaining Neiman Marcus Last Call locations. 12 Saks OFF 5TH locations are slated to remain open, however, they will only operate to serve as a "selling channel for residual inventory for Saks Fifth Avenue, Neiman Marcus and Bergdorf Goodman." Saks Global also stated that they will stop purchasing merchandise directly for Saks OFF 5TH. Select stores will conduct liquidation sales on January 30, with gift cards to stop being accepted at affected stores before February 14. Saks Global also announced the permanent closure its Miramar, Florida support center, laying off all workers.

On February 10, 2026, Saks Global announced it would close 8 Saks Fifth Avenue stores and 1 Neiman Marcus store, leaving 25 Saks Fifth Avenue stores, 35 Neiman Marcus stores and two Bergdorf Goodman stores still open for business.

In February 2026 U.S. federal Judge Alfredo Perez gave final approval for $1 billion in debtor-in-possession financing, and Saks Global was expected to use up to $600 million of the new financing to pay outstanding debt to vendors.

On March 6, 2026, Saks Global announced 15 more store closures in an effort to further cut costs and focus on more profitable locations. The stores are 12 Saks Fifth Avenue and 3 Neiman Marcus locations slated to close by the end of May 2026. Saks Global subsequently decided to keep three of these stores opened. The historic Neiman Marcus flagship operating in downtown Dallas since 1914 will close permanently on September 30, 2026, leaving 32 stores continuing to operate, including the Dallas NorthPark Center location.

=== Change of name and post-bankruptcy ===
With Saks Fifth Avenue having closed much of its stores and Neiman Marcus in contrast retained the vast majority of its locations, Saks Global itself was renamed Exemplar Luxury Group in late June 2026 as it exited bankruptcy. The company reduced 75% of its debt which is now under $1 billion though still considered significant. A new board of seven people will lead the company consisting of Geoffroy van Raemdonck, two representatives from Pentwater Capital Management and Bracebridge Capital each, as well as a former CEO from Ulta Beauty and another one previously of DFS Group.

Exemplar currently has 49 stores across its main nameplates which includes Bergdorf Goodman’s two locations that are counted as one. This number doesn't take into account the 12 remaining Saks Off 5th stores that are "kept open strictly to move excess inventory." The company is emerging with a much smaller retail presence than it had before a bankruptcy that ultimately erased 18 Saks Fifth Avenue stores, 3 Neiman Marcus stores, 57 Saks Off 5th stores and all 5 Neiman Marcus Last Call stores.

== Nameplates ==
Name	Year founded	Year closed	Notes
Bergdorf Goodman	1899	—N/a	
Horchow	1971	2026	Folded into Neiman Marcus
Neiman Marcus	1907	—N/a	
Neiman Marcus Last Call	1988	2026	Liquidated
Saks Fifth Avenue	1867	—N/a	
Saks Off 5th	1990	—N/a	

== Gallery ==
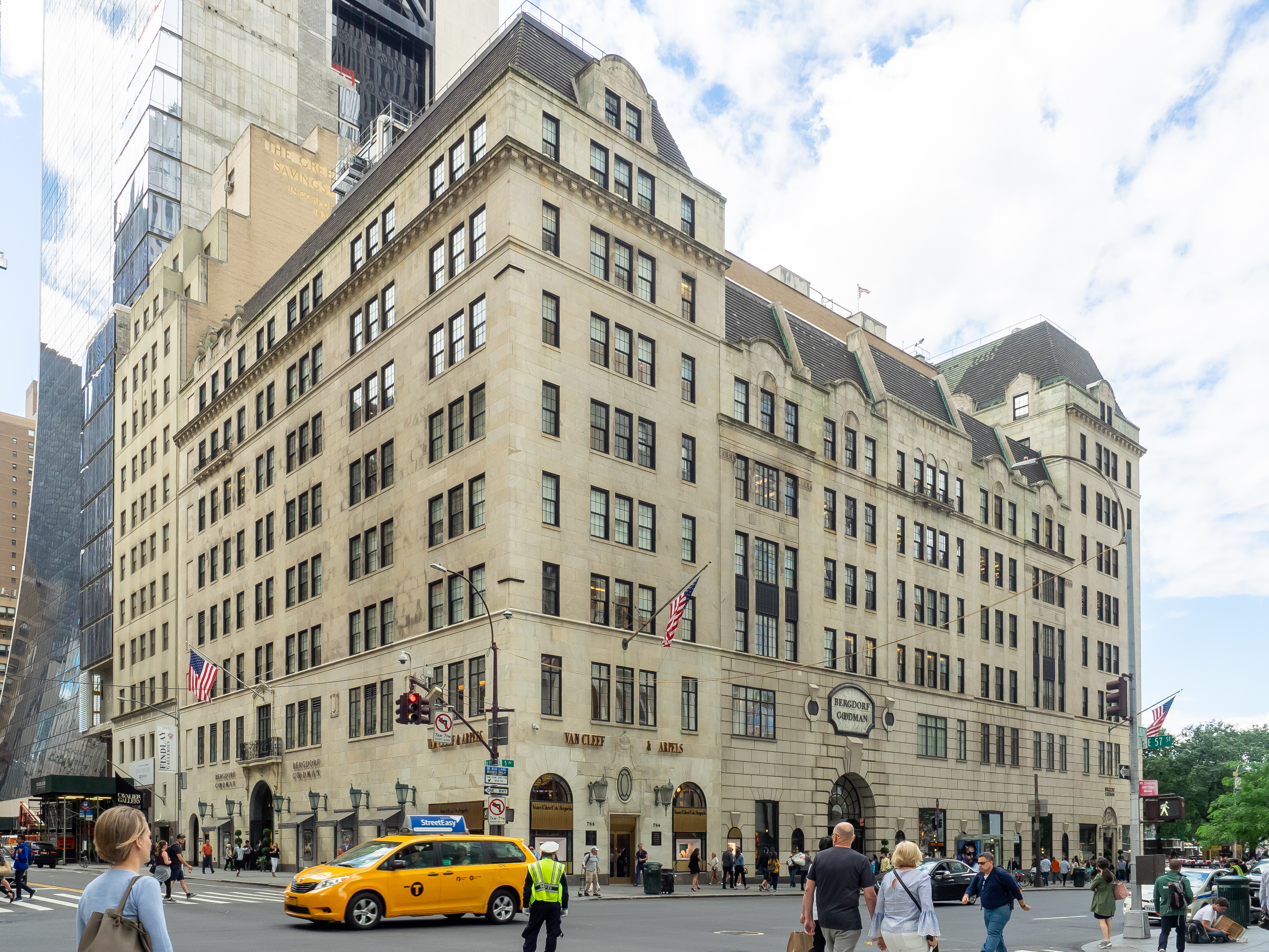
Bergdorf Goodman flagship store (2019)

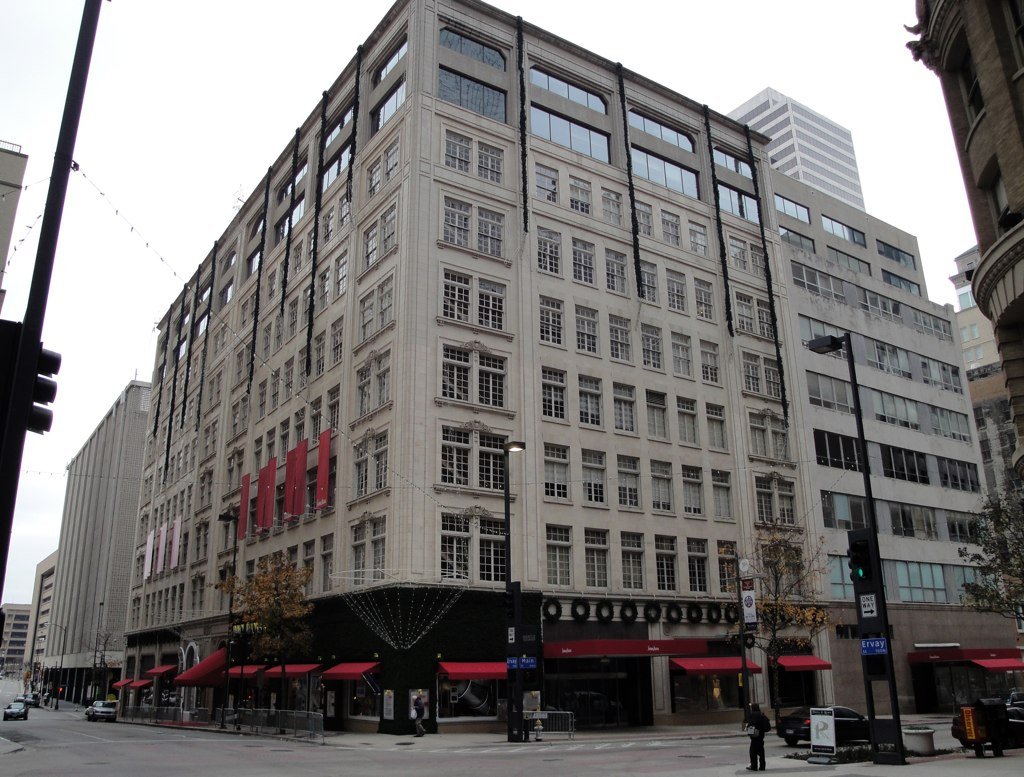
Neiman Marcus flagship store (2010)

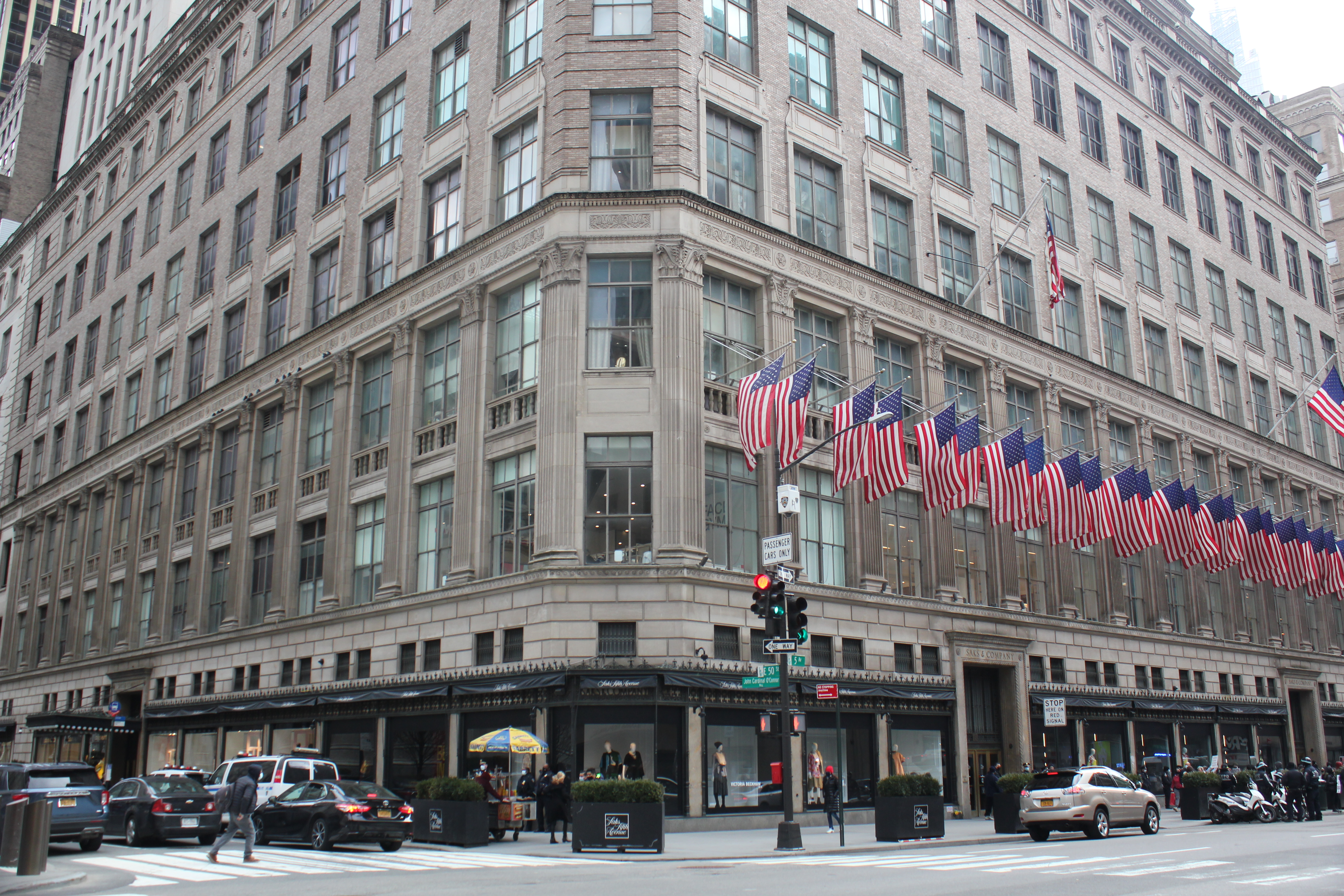
Saks Fifth Avenue flagship store (2021)
