= Kate Lanphear =

American fashion editor

Kate Lanphear is an American fashion editor. Previously editor in chief of Maxim, she is women’s style director at The New York Times style magazine, T.

== Career ==
Previously Lanphear was style director at Elle, then The New York Times’s T magazine. In September 2014, she became editor-in-chief of Maxim, hired in 2014 to lead a redesign of the faltering magazine (in 2007 ownership of the magazine sold for $250 million; in 2014 it sold again for only $2 million.) Her redesign hewed more closely to the style of men's magazines like Esquire and GQ that attracted older, more affluent readers; under her tenure, the magazine moved away from "photo spreads of scantily clad women" and featured a man (Idris Elba) on the cover for the first time. Advertising pages grew significantly, but newsstand sales of the magazine fell, and Lanphear left the magazine in November 2015.

She next became head of Google's Fashion Week search project. Women's Wear Daily described the project as focused on New York Fashion Week and offering "searchable highlights provided by designers and shopping directly from the runway." In October 2017, she became creative director at Marie Claire, following Nina García’s departure. Lanphear held the role until February 2020. In June, she rejoined T Magazine as women’s style director.
