= Kathy Halbreich =

American art curator and museum director (born 1949)

- Born: 1949 (age 76–77); United States
- Education: Bennington College
- Occupations: Art curator Museum director
- Years active: 1970s–present
- Known for: Director of the Walker Art Center, Associate director of the Museum of Modern Art, Director of the Robert Rauschenberg Foundation

Kathy Halbreich (/ˈhɑːlbraɪʃ/ HAHL-brysh; born 1949) is an American art curator and museum director.

== Early life and education ==
Halbreich was born to Betty Stoll and Sonny Halbreich in 1949. She earned her BA from Bennington College.

== Career ==
Halbreich was director of the Albert and Vera List Visual Arts Center at MIT, where she designed a new arts building with architect I.M. Pei. She was then the curator of contemporary art at the Museum of Fine Arts, Boston.

In 1991, Halbreich was hired as director of the Walker Art Center. Under her leadership, the museum broadened its reputation for developing emerging talent, hosting avant-garde performances and exhibitions. She oversaw a $73.8 million expansion at the Walker and announced her retirement in 2007. She was hired as an associate director of the Museum of Modern Art in 2008. At MoMA, Halbreich curated a 2014 retrospective of German artist Sigmar Polke and a 2018 Bruce Nauman exhibition.

In September, 2017 Halbreich was appointed director of the Robert Rauschenberg Foundation.

== Other activities ==
Halbreich was a member of the juries that selected Kerstin Brätsch for the Edvard Munch Art Award (2017) and Doris Salcedo for the Nomura Art Award (2019). She has also served on the selection committee that chose the artist exhibiting at the American pavilion at the Venice Biennale.
