= Maureen Chiquet =

American businesswoman (born 1963)

- Born: Maureen Cathy Popkin; 1963 (age 62–63) St. Louis, Missouri, US
- Occupation: Author; business woman
- Education: Yale University, John Burroughs School

Maureen Chiquet (born 1963) is an American businesswoman who was CEO of fashion house Chanel from 2007 to 2016.

She is the author of Beyond the Label: Women, Leadership & Success on Our Own Terms (Harper Business, 2017).

== Early life ==
Chiquet was born in St. Louis, Missouri, where she later attended John Burroughs School. She studied at Yale University in Connecticut, where she graduated with a degree in literature with an emphasis in film. Unsure of what career to pursue after graduation, she reportedly walked out midway through a Law School Admission Test. Chiquet went on to do a marketing internship at L'Oréal Paris, work she later described as "the beginning of my career and love affair with the world of beauty and fashion".

== Career ==
Chiquet returned to the U.S. in 1988, joining Gap Inc. as an assistant merchandiser in San Francisco. She received praise in 1994 for helping launch the Old Navy brand, which soon became a leading part of the business, worth a total of $5 billion. She went on to become executive vice president of merchandising, planning and production. In 2002, she briefly joined another Gap subsidiary, Banana Republic.

In 2003, Chiquet took a job with Chanel, a decision she has called the most important of her career. A year later, she was appointed president of Chanel in the U.S., responsible for fragrance and beauty, fashion, watches, and fine jewellery divisions. When Chanel restructured in 2007, Chiquet became company-wide CEO. Portfolio magazine credited Chiquet with transforming Chanel into "the single most valuable fashion brand", growing it to be worth $6.2 billion.

Chiquet left Chanel in January 2016, citing "strategic differences." The company's statement said Chiquet oversaw "successful international expansion of the House of Chanel, enhanced its luxury positioning and timeless image, and grew the business in all categories. She also established a truly global organization and enhanced the culture and leadership of the company."

In April 2016, she was invited to give the opening keynote for the New York Times Luxury Conference in Versailles. Her speech traced her own leadership journey, and urged attendees to "start close in" with their own company cultures and leadership initiatives as a way of facing increasing industry disruption and connecting with 21st-century luxury consumers.

Chiquet's book, Beyond the Label: Women, Leadership & Success on Our Own Terms, was released by Harper Business on April 18, 2017. She said she wrote it to "open up the aperture through which we look at the world. I want us to reconsider what it means to be a woman, a mentor, a wife, a mother." In the book, she emphasizes integrating feminine leadership into existing corporate structures. "Why should we separate art from business, feelings from logic, intuition from judgment? Who decided you can’t be determined and flexible, introspective and attuned, mother and top executive? And where does it state standing unflinchingly in your vulnerability, embracing your femininity, won’t make you stronger?"

A Francophile, Chiquet said, "I just dreamed about living in Paris and being French" in an interview with Time.

== Other activities ==
- Kering, Member of the Board of Directors (since 2023)
- Golden Goose, Chair of the Board of Directors (since 2020)
- Canada Goose, Non-Executive Member of the Board of Directors (since 2017)
- Vivendi, Member of the Board of Directors (2010–2013)
