= Dawn Mello =

American fashion retail executive (1931–2020)

Dawn Mello (October 5, 1931 – February 16, 2020) was an American fashion retail executive and consultant and the one-time fashion director and president of Bergdorf Goodman. Subsequently she moved to Italy to manage Gucci. Later she was the president of her own firm, Dawn Mello & Associates LLC.

== Biography ==
Dawn Mello was born in Lynn, Massachusetts, and studied at the Modern School of Fashion and Design in Boston and the Boston Museum School of Fine Arts.

She started her career as an assistant at B. Altman and Company in 1959. From 1960 to 1971, she worked at The May Department Stores Company's NY buying office.

In 1975, Mello was hired by Bergdorf's then chairman Ira Neimark to become the store's fashion director. It was during this tenure at the store that she is credited with discovering and promoting the talents and designs of Michael Kors. In the 1980s, she was a mentor to Donna Karan.

Dawn Mello was hired in November 1989 as Gucci's executive vice president and chief designer. She reduced the number of stores from +1,000 to 180 in a move to rebuild the brand’s exclusivity. She also reduced the number of items sold by Gucci from 22,000 to 7,000. She revived the Bamboo bag and the Gucci loafer. Dawn Mello hired Tom Ford to oversee Gucci women's ready-to-wear collection.

She quit after 5 years in Italy and returned to Bergdorf Goodman as president of the company.

In 2006, she received the Isobel S. Sinesi Lifetime Achievement in Fashion Award from the School of Fashion Design. Mello died on February 16, 2020, at the age of 88.

== Private life ==
In 1998, she purchased a penthouse in New York (30 Sutton Place) that was previously owned by Doris Duke. It was listed on the market a few months after her death.

== Filmography ==
Mello appeared in the 2013 documentary Scatter My Ashes at Bergdorf's.
