= My First Kiss (film) =

- Directed by: David Wexler
- Written by: David Wexler
- Produced by: David Wexler
- Release date: 2008
- Country: United States
- Language: English

My First Kiss is a 2008 drama film, written and directed by David Wexler.

The short was an Official Selection of the Big Apple Film Festival, Silver Lei winner of the Honolulu International Film Festival, and nominated for Best Narrative Film at the Miami Short Film Festival.

== Plot ==
Michelle films her boyfriend and asks questions about the first day they met. The narrative flashes back and forth from this present-day video log to the nervous and semi-awkward goings-on of the protagonist (Joey) getting ready for girls to come over to his house. Uncomfortable moments, embarrassing camp stories, and confrontations between drifting friends ensue. It feels like that first break back home from college.
