= Fashionphile =

American online fashion resale website

- Type: Private
- Industry: Recommerce
- Founded: 1999; 27 years ago
- Founder: Sarah Davis
- Headquarters: Carlsbad, California, United States
- Key people: Ben Hemminger (CEO)
- Products: Ready-to-wear; couture; handbags; footwear; accessories; jewelry; watches; homewear
- Services: Consignment
- Website: www.fashionphile.com

Fashionphile (stylized as FASHIONPHILE) is an American luxury recommerce brand where customers can buy and sell pre-owned designer handbags and accessories. It maintains one of the largest inventories of luxury handbags.

Fashionphile operates an online and physical retail network with flagship stores in New York, San Diego, and Los Angeles. The company distributes authenticated pre-owned luxury items through its e-commerce platform and brick-and-mortar locations across the United States.

== History ==
Founded by Sarah Davis in 1999, Fashionphile began as an eBay storefront. During this time, Davis noticed a prevalence of counterfeit items on eBay. In response, Davis began creating authentication guides to educate buyers.

In 2006, Davis partnered with Ben Hemminger and launched Fashionphile's own website. In 2008, they opened their first store in Beverly Hills, followed by a San Francisco location in 2009.

In 2012, the company opened its headquarters and first flagship store in San Diego, CA. Fashionphile later established Fashionphile University, a program designed for employees to obtain comprehensive training on identifying counterfeit goods.

In 2019, Fashionphile partnered with Neiman Marcus, which took a minority stake in the company. This marked the first partnership between a major luxury retailer and a re-commerce brand.

In 2021, Fashionphile opened a location in Downtown Los Angeles. The following year, it opened its second flagship store and authentication center in Chelsea.

In 2023, Fashionphile opened locations at the Irvine Spectrum and Carlsbad Premium Outlets. It also became a Certified B Corporation.

For its 25th anniversary in 2024, Fashionphile announced its first celebrity partnership with Emma Roberts. As part of the collaboration, Emma Roberts curated an accessories capsule collection. Fashionphile reported a 67% increase in profits in 2024. The company attributed this growth to its expanding retail presence and entry into international wholesale markets. Later in 2024, Fashionphile opened a location at the Scottsdale Quarter in Arizona.

In 2025, Elle named Fashionphile as one of the best places to purchase used designer handbags.

== Products and services ==
Fashionphile services include authentication, pricing, photographing, and listing items, as well as handling shipping, payments and customer service. They also provide virtual consultations with personal shoppers, in-store appointments, and a private client relations service for customers with larger collections.

=== Authentication ===
Fashionphile's authentication process is a key aspect of its business model. In 2024, Fashionphile introduced Fashionphile Certified, a service which allows customers to authenticate luxury items with in-house experts. In 2025, it launched Fashionphile Certified, the brand's in-house authentication service.

== Retail locations and online operations ==
Fashionphile operates both online and in physical locations. The brand has retail stores in California, New York, Utah, Texas, Arizona, Florida, Georgia, and Pennsylvania, with flagship locations in New York, San Diego, and Los Angeles.

In July 2024, the company opened a pop-up store at the Hotel Del Coronado that lasted for the duration of the month.

== Partnerships and collaborations ==
Fashionphile partnered with Gab Waller and the Peninsula Beverly Hills in 2023 on a curated luxury showcase. That same year, Fashionphile also became a member of the Accessories Council through a partnership with FashionGo. It also hosted the announcement of the Accessories Council Design Excellence Awards winners. The company also partnered with the Fashion Scholarship Fund (FSF) in 2023, to establish the Fashionphile x FSF Scholarship, which has been awarded annually since.

Fashionphile maintains an ongoing partnership with the Fashion Institute of Technology (FIT). It supports the institution through donations and by hosting events and panels with FIT faculty.

Fashionphile has collaborated with celebrities in partnerships beginning with Emma Roberts in 2024 for its first-ever celebrity partnership. In 2025, the company partnered with Nichole Richie and Martha Stewart. In 2026, it partnered with Cardi B and Rylee Arnold.

Fashionphile collaborated with the Council of Fashion Designers of America (CFDA) in 2025.

== Sustainability ==
Fashionphile operates within a circular economy model. It is one of the eleven founding members of the American Circular Textiles policy group, which was created in 2022 to support American textile recycling and recovery. In 2023, Fashionphile became a Certified B Corporation.
