= Victoria Roberts (cartoonist) =

American cartoonist

Victoria Roberts is a cartoonist and performer. A staff cartoonist for The New Yorker since 1988, Roberts' work has also appeared in The Wall Street Journal, The Washington Post, Ms. Magazine, and many other magazines and newspapers. She illustrates the Q&A weekly science question in The New York Times. She was called Australia's most successful female cartoonist by The Age. She is the author of After the Fall, published by W. W. Norton and Company in November 2012.

Her style has been described as whimsical, and according to The Sydney Morning Herald, "there is delight, and childish embellishments". In her own words, she likes "to draw fat little ladies with hearing aids, weird infants with glasses, and domestic scenes; I see things as people at home see them".

Her first cartoon strip, "My Sunday" appeared weekly in Australia's Nation Review when she was nineteen. In the strip, Roberts illustrates the hypothetical Sundays of famous people. Roberts has written and/or illustrated over 20 books, and received several grants, awards, and residencies, including an Australian Bicentennial grant for Australia Felix, a cartoon history of Australia published by Chatto & Windus.

Roberts has also worked in animation. Credits include "Goodbye Sally Goldstein" and "The Maitland and Morpeth Quartet", and also in radio, recording "Divinity Fudge" for WNYC, and "The Life of Truman Capote” for ABC Radio Australia.

Since 2004, she has appeared on stage as her earliest cartoon character Nona Appleby. Nona is a kimono-clad Australian octogenarian. Her first solo show, Nona, opened at the National Museum for Women in Washington, D.C. in 2005, and went on to a season at Urban Stages in New York City.

Born in Manhattan, Roberts grew up in Mexico City and Sydney. She lives in New York City and Mexico.
