= Bergdorf Goodman =

American luxury department store

Coordinates: 40°45′48″N 73°58′27″W

Bergdorf Goodman Inc.

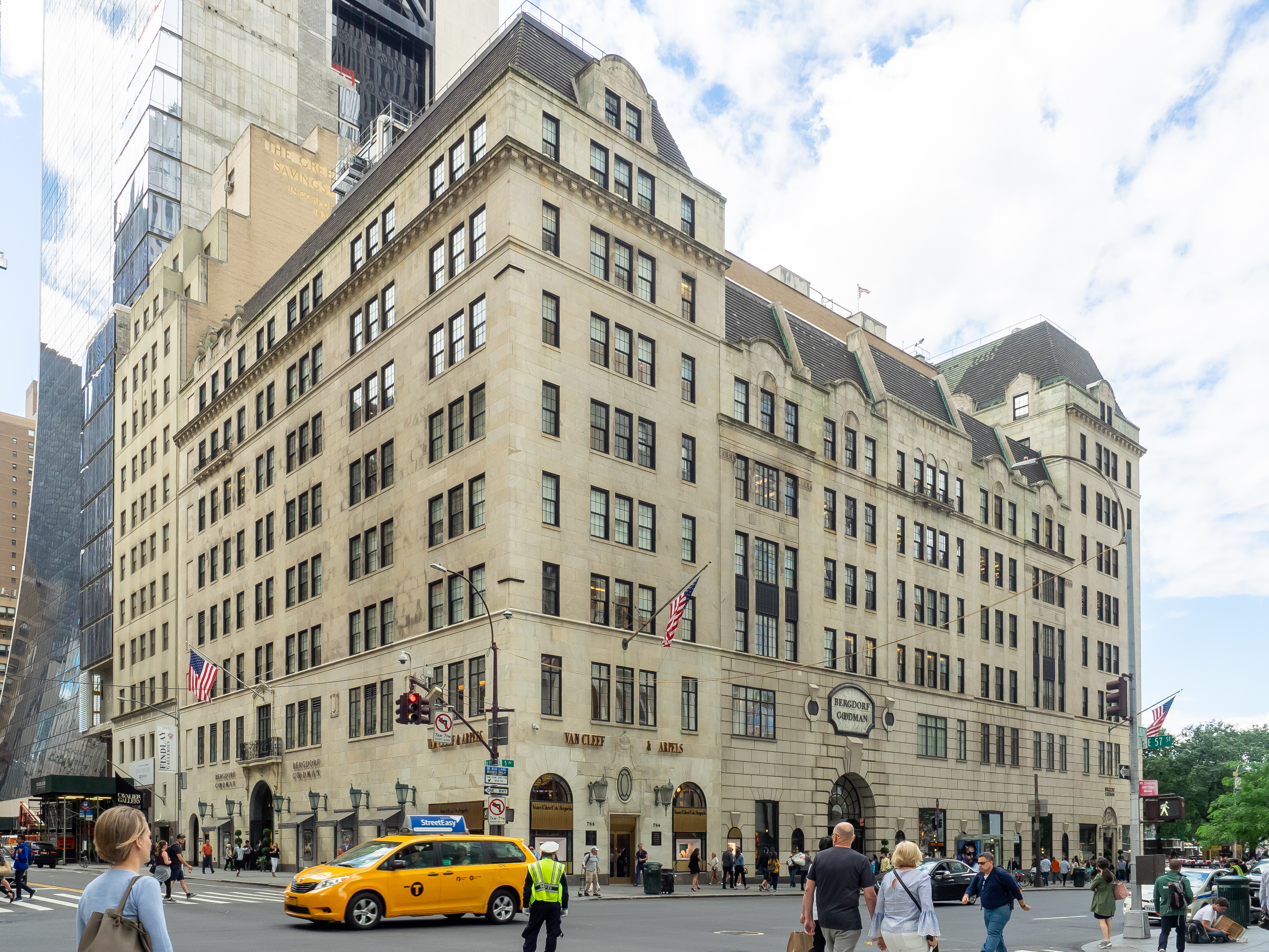
- Exterior of the Bergdorf Goodman Building (2019)
- Type: Subsidiary
- Industry: Retail
- Founded: 1899; 127 years ago in New York City, United States
- Founder: Herman Bergdorf
- Headquarters: Bergdorf Goodman Building, New York City, New York, United States
- Number of locations: 2 (women's and men's)
- Key people: Linda Fargo (women's creative director); Bruce Pask (men's creative director)
- Products: Ready-to-wear; couture; footwear; handbags; accessories; home decor; jewelry; cosmetics
- Parent: Carter Hawley Hale Stores (1972–1987); Neiman Marcus Group (1987–2024); Exemplar Luxury Group (Note: Formerly known as Saks Global from 2024 to 2026.) (2024–Present)
- Website: bergdorfgoodman.com

Bergdorf Goodman Inc. is a luxury department store founded in 1899 by Herman Bergdorf. It operates a women's store in the Bergdorf Goodman Building and a men's store across the street at 745 Fifth Avenue in Midtown Manhattan. Its parent company is Exemplar Luxury Group.

== History ==
=== Founding and early history (1899–1951) ===
The company traces its origins to 1899 when Herman Bergdorf, an immigrant from Alsace, opened a tailor's shop just above Union Square in downtown Manhattan.

Edwin Goodman, a 23-year-old American Jewish merchant, based in Lockport, New York, moved to New York City to work as an apprentice for Bergdorf. Within two years, Goodman had raised enough money to purchase an interest in the business, which was renamed Bergdorf Goodman in 1901. In 1906, Bergdorf Goodman moved to a new location on 32nd Street, just west of Fifth Avenue and "Ladies' Mile". While Bergdorf preferred the less expensive side street location, Goodman prevailed with the new location and bought Bergdorf's interest in the company. Bergdorf would retire to Paris.

Although Goodman had developed a good business as a ladies' tailor on 32nd Street, he decided to move uptown in 1914. He constructed a five-story building at 616 Fifth Avenue, on the site of what is today Rockefeller Center. In 1914, he became the first couturier to introduce ready-to-wear, making Bergdorf Goodman a destination for American and French fashion.

The store moved to its present location at Fifth Avenue and 58th Street in 1928, building its Beaux-Arts style Bergdorf Goodman Building on the site of the Cornelius Vanderbilt II House. Goodman was unsure of the success of the new store's location, as he was uncertain whether customers would follow the store uptown and so designed the new store so that it could be subdivided into sections with storefronts that could be let if needed. Early tenants included Van Cleef & Arpels, the Grande Maison de Blanc and Dobbs the Hatter. During the Great Depression, however, Goodman thrived, buying the entire building. Throughout the 1930s, he purchased the mortgages of the surrounding businesses, eventually acquiring the entire block. During this period, Bergdorf Goodman was successful enough to have merited an expansion beyond the single store. However, Goodman preferred to operate in a single location where he would be able to personally maintain the quality of the merchandise and service.

=== The second generation (1951–1972) ===
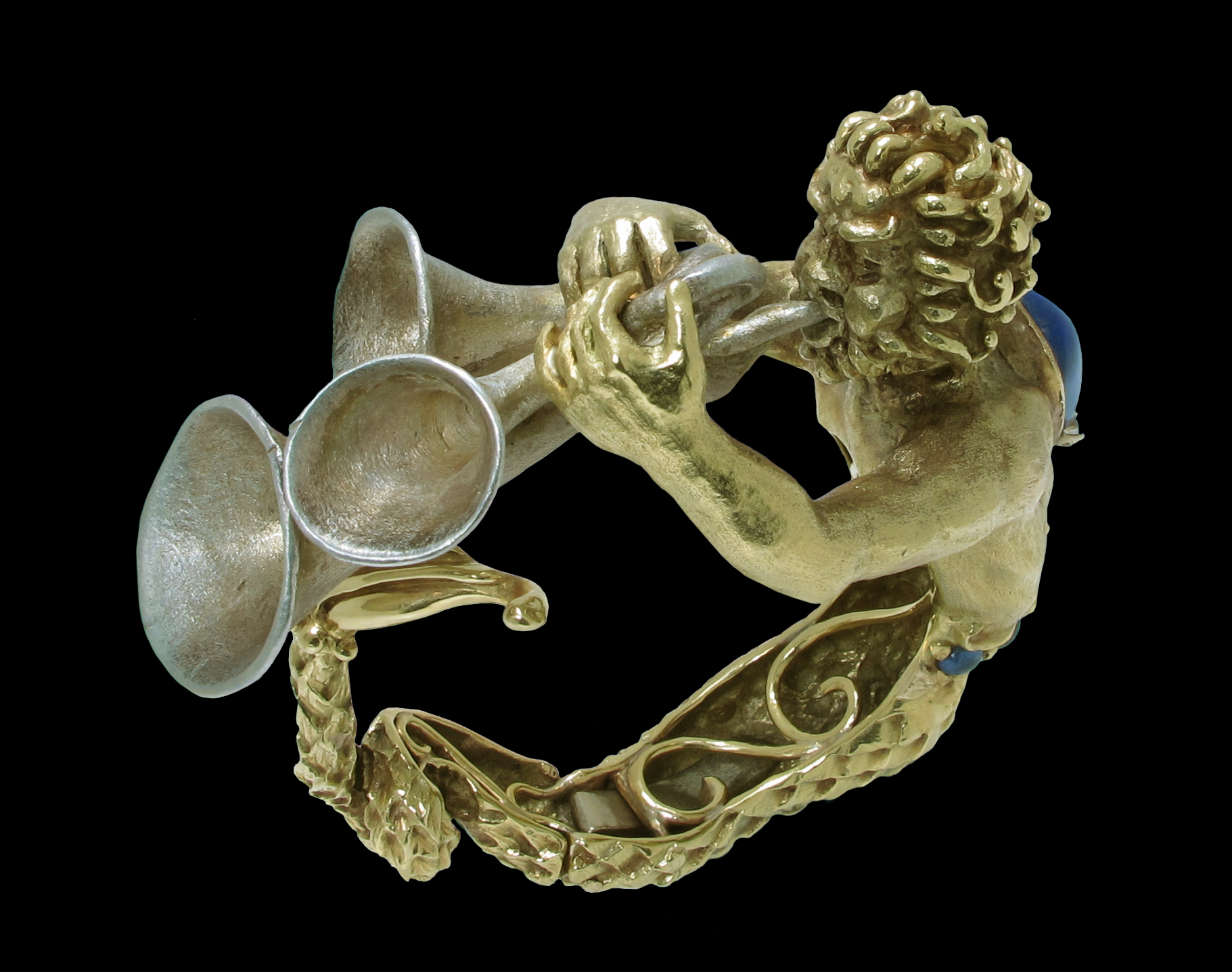
"The Neptune Bracelet," An early Alwand Vahan Design made for Bergdorf Goodman in 1969

Miss Bergdorf dress from Taffy, designer Anne T. Hill, 1956

Goodman's son, Andrew, assumed the role of president in 1951 and succeeded as head of the company in 1953, following the death of his father. Andrew was responsible for enhancing Bergdorf's reputation and expanding its range of merchandise and services.

During Andrew's tenure as chairman, Bergdorf opened a fur salon (headed by Emeric Partos from 1955 to 1975), developed the successful Bergdorf Goodman Number Nine perfume ("Love Potion Number Nine"), and created Miss Bergdorf, a ready-to-wear line for younger customers.

The Bergdorf Goodman Building began a $1 million expansion in 1959 ($11 million today) into two adjacent buildings. The Boys and Girls gift shop expanded into a whole floor, and the beauty salon and bridal, fur and men's departments also expanded. A $2.5 million expansion in 1967 ($24.1 million today) nearly doubled the store's area, to 120,000 square feet (11,000 m^{2}). A branch in Chicago was proposed in 1965 but canceled two years later.

=== New ownership (1972–1990) ===
Broadway-Hale Stores proposed merging with Bergdorf Goodman in 1971, and the Federal Trade Commission approved the merger the next year. Broadway-Hale Stores, which would become Carter Hawley Hale Stores (CHH), completed its acquisition of Bergdorf Goodman in June 1972. CHH had acquired Neiman Marcus, a three-unit operation at the time, in 1969. By the time of the sale, Bergdorf Goodman was the only large high-quality specialty store in the U.S. that remained independently owned. However, its decision not to build suburban branches left it with a relatively modest profit margin. Goodman remained the landlord of the store and kept a penthouse apartment on the building's top floor.

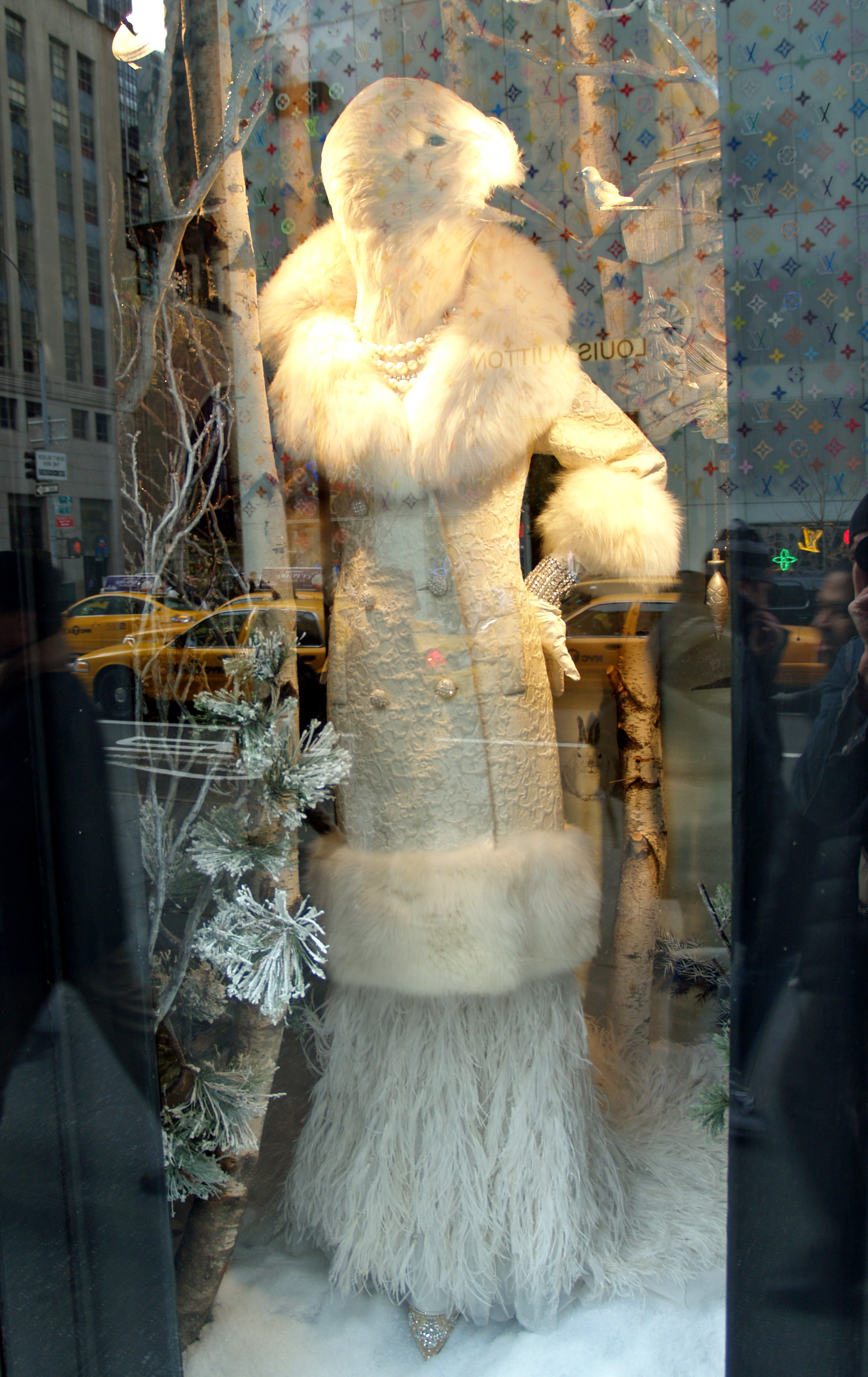
A Badgley Mischka fur coat on display in the window of Bergdorf Goodman's Fifth Avenue store in 2008

At first, CHH considered building branch locations, ultimately only constructing one location, in nearby White Plains, New York, in 1974. This location eventually became a Neiman Marcus branch in 1980. To combat its image difficulties, the company hired Dawn Mello in 1975 as vice president of fashion. She was successful in reinvigorating the conservative store and became president in 1984. She left her post in 1989 to work for the floundering Italian fashion house Gucci, though she returned to her post as president in 1994.

Bergdorf Goodman's parent company became the object of takeover bids in the 1980s. As a way to maintain its independence, Carter Hawley Hale Stores completed a major financial restructuring. In 1987, Bergdorf Goodman was spun-off, together with Neiman Marcus and Contempo Casuals, to form Neiman Marcus Group. The new company was headquartered in Dallas, Texas, where the significantly larger Neiman Marcus had been based for 80 years.

=== Reaching the centennial (1990–Present) ===
Chairman and CEO Ira Neimark expanded the women's store three times in the 1990s. He moved the men's store across the street to the former FAO Schwarz space at 745 Fifth Avenue in 1990. This move allowed more space for women's fashions. In 1997, the former Goodman family apartment on the building's ninth floor became the John Barrett Salon and Susan Ciminelli Day Spa. In 1999, the Beauty Level opened directly below the main floor, offering a luxury spa and Goodman's Café, serving lunch and afternoon tea.

In 2002, the Bergdorf Goodman Building underwent a major restoration, including a restoration of the main floor of the women's store. In 2003, the store introduced new boutiques for Chanel, Giorgio Armani, Gucci, Versace, and Yves Saint Laurent. The Bergdorf Goodman Men's store features exclusive brands such as Loro Piana, Kiton, Brunello Cucinelli, John Lobb, Thom Browne, Bontoni, Tom Ford, and Charvet.

On May 2, 2005, two private equity firms, Texas Pacific Group and Warburg Pincus, acquired the Neiman Marcus Group and its Bergdorf subsidiary, in a leveraged buyout (LBO).

In December 2024, Bergdorf Goodman was acquired as part of the $2.7B Neiman Marcus Group acquisition by Saks Global.

On January 14, 2026, Saks Global filed for Chapter 11 bankruptcy protection after struggling with heavy debt relying on its acquisition and merger of Neiman Marcus. The company also blamed a rapid consumer shift in luxury goods due to inflating prices.

== In media and popular culture ==
The store has been the subject of two documentary films: the 2001 film Dita and the Family Business, exploring the store from the point of view of its owners, and the 2013 feature documentary Scatter My Ashes at Bergdorf's, which features many testimonials from designers and celebrities. In 1953's movie How to Marry a Millionaire, Lauren Bacall, Betty Grable, and Marilyn Monroe consider "the mink department at Bergdorf's" the ideal location to meet men. In a Chicago hotel room scene in the 1959 movie North by Northwest, Eva Marie Saint’s character slips a note into her handbag which reveals a Bergdorf Goodman label inside. Cary Grant sends Doris Day on a shopping spree at the store in the 1962 movie That Touch of Mink. In the 1965 movie How to Murder Your Wife, Jack Lemmon’s character enters the Bergdorf Goodman store to buy a mannequin to test out his murder plot. The store has also made several appearances in the cartoon Neo Yokio. The protagonist, Kaz Kaan, and his rival, Arcangelo, both buy their suits from Bergdorf's. Most recently, Bergdorf Goodman was featured in a scene of the film Ocean's 8 in which Sandra Bullock's character steals cosmetics from the store.

Bergdorf Goodman was featured in a scene in the film Arthur (1981). The store was also featured in the Miss Piggy/Joan Rivers scene of The Muppets Take Manhattan. In the television series Sex and the City, the store was a favorite shopping location of central character Carrie Bradshaw (Sarah Jessica Parker). It was also seen in the motion picture Sex and the City 2 (2010) . In the TV series Parks and Recreation, the character April Ludgate (Aubrey Plaza) pretends on multiple occasions to be an exaggerated socialite named "Janet Snakehole", whose husband keeps her in "the finest Bergdorf Goodman" clothing. The first time April plays this character within a character, she is mock arrested by another character-in-character, Andy Dwyer (Chris Pratt) pretending to be FBI agent Burt Macklin. Macklin attempts to arrest Snakehole, causing Snakehole to shriek that she never stole the (assumedly Bergdorf Goodman) jewels, her sister did, "but now she's been eaten by wolves!"

In 2019, news journalist E. Jean Carroll alleged that Donald Trump had sexually assaulted her in a Bergdorf Goodman dressing room in the 1990s. Trump was found liable of sexually assaulting her by a jury in 2023, but not liable of raping her. In March 2024, Trump referred to Carroll as "Miss Bergdorf Goodman" in an interview on the CNBC show "Squawk Box", which led to Carroll's attorney threatening a third defamation lawsuit against Trump.

== See also ==
- Barneys New York
- Artipoppe
- Saks Fifth Avenue
- List of department stores
