= Calvin Klein (fashion house) =

American fashion retailer chain

Calvin Klein Inc.

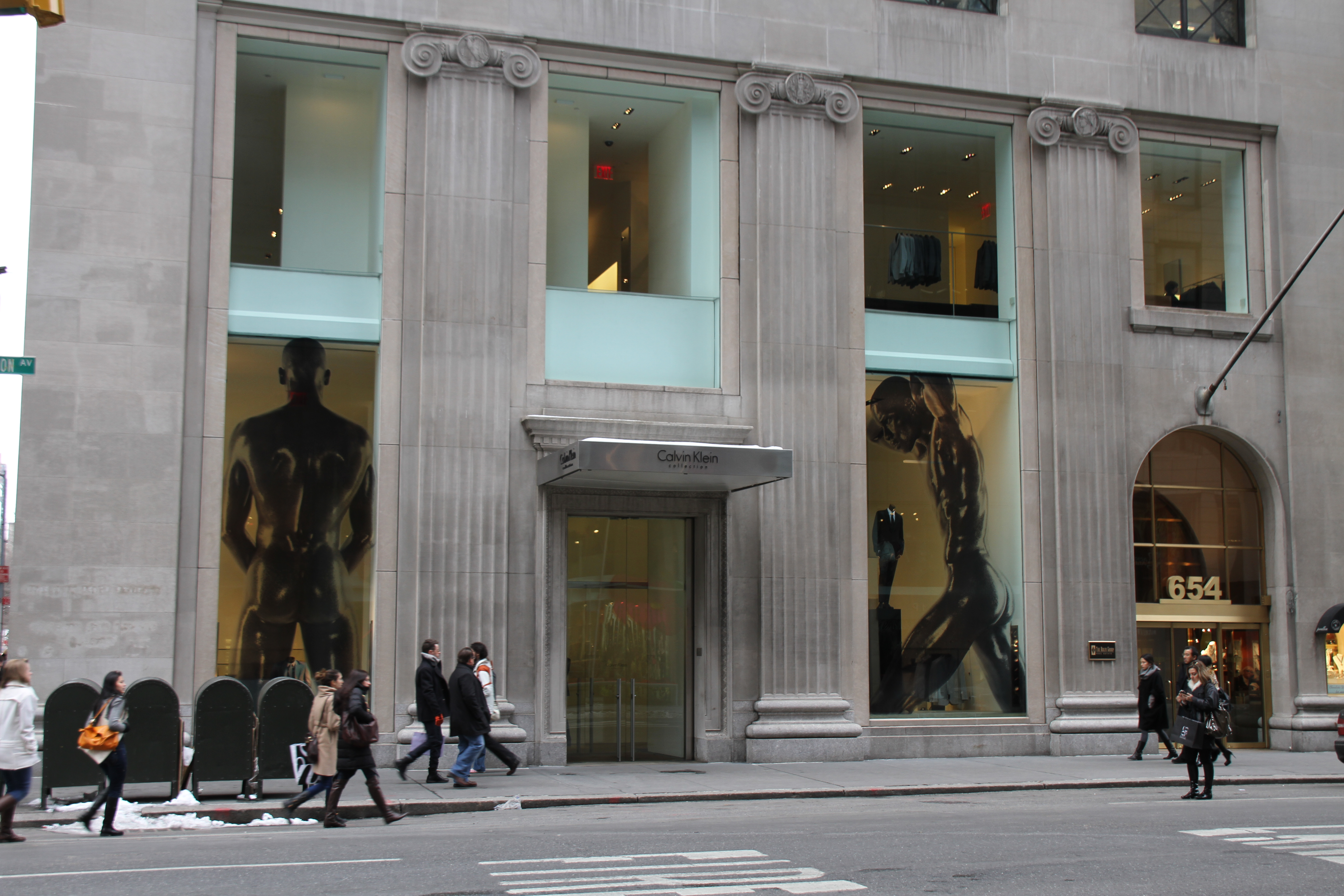
- The Calvin Klein flagship store on Madison Avenue
- Type: Subsidiary
- Industry: Fashion
- Founded: 1968; 58 years ago
- Founders: Calvin Klein; Barry K. Schwartz
- Headquarters: New York City, U.S.
- Area served: Worldwide
- Key people: David Savman (President); Zac Coughlin (CFO); Veronica Leoni (Creative Director)
- Products: Apparel, perfume, undergarments, watches, etc.
- Services: Retailing
- Revenue: ▲US$3.78 billion (2022)
- Parent: PVH (2002–present)
- Website: calvinklein.com

Calvin Klein Inc. (Note: /klaɪn/ KLYNE) is an American fashion and lifestyle brand founded in 1968 by designer Calvin Klein and businessman Barry K. Schwartz in New York City. The company, which became famous for its designer underwear and denim lines in the 1980s, specializes in ready-to-wear clothing, leather products, lifestyle accessories and shoes, home furnishings, perfume, cosmetics, eyewear, jewelry and watches. Its high-end runway fashion division, which represents the top level of the various Calvin Klein sub-brands, debuted its final collection in 2019, with Raf Simons as creative director. The label was later revived in 2025, with Veronica Leoni serving as the new creative director.

Calvin Klein was acquired by PVH Corp. in 2003 for a total of $700 million. It is headquartered in Midtown Manhattan, New York City, and has substantial market share in retail and commercial lines around the globe. In 2013, PVH bought Warnaco Group, one of the largest Calvin Klein licensees, for US$2.8 billion. Global retail sales under the brand, including sales by the label's licensees, amounted to US$9 billion in 2022.

== History ==
=== The early years ===
Calvin Klein was one of several design leaders raised in the Jewish community in the Bronx, along with Robert Denning and Ralph Lauren. He became a protégé of Baron de Gunzburg.

In 1968, Klein founded Calvin Klein Limited, a coat shop in the York Hotel in New York City, with $10,000. The first Calvin Klein collection was a line of "youthful, understated coats and dresses" featured at the New York City store Bonwit Teller.

In September 1969, Klein appeared on the cover of Vogue magazine.

=== 1970s ===
Former logo from 1975 to 1992

In 1973, Klein received his first Coty American Fashion Critics' Award for his 74-piece womenswear collection – the youngest recipient at that time. He won the award again in 1974 and 1975. By 1977, annual revenues had increased to $30 million (equivalent to $159 million in 2025), and Klein had licenses for scarves, shoes, belts, furs, sunglasses, and bedsheets. Klein and Schwartz were making $4 million each. After the company signed licenses for cosmetics, jeans, and menswear, Klein's annual retail volume was estimated at $100 million (equivalent to $531 million in 2025). By 1981, Fortune figured Klein's annual income at $8.5 million. In the mid-1970s, he had created a designer-jeans craze by putting his name on the back pocket. Klein's design assistant at the time, Jeffrey Banks, has claimed credit for the logo garments, stating that he had the logo from a press folder silkscreened onto the sleeve of a brown T-shirt as a present for Klein. The gift was assumed by Schwartz to be part of the upcoming line, and similar logo shirts formed the uniform for the front-of-house staff at Klein's next catwalk show, leading to buyer demand.

=== 1980s ===
The American market of men's underwear was changed – from one where most men's underwear was white, purchased in packs of three by a "wife, mother or girlfriend when they needed to be" to one where "the American male [cares] about the brand of something few ever see".

=== 1990s ===
Former logo from 1992 to 2017

Although the company struggled financially in the early 1990s, Calvin Klein managed to regain and increase profitability throughout the later 1990s, mainly through the success of his underwear and fragrance lines, as well as the ck sportswear line. During his 1990–1995 stint as Calvin Klein's head of menswear design, John Varvatos pioneered a type of men's underwear called boxer briefs, a hybrid of boxer shorts and briefs. Made famous by a series of 1992 print ads featuring Mark Wahlberg, they have been called "one of the greatest apparel revolutions of the century."

=== 2002–present: Acquisition by Phillips van Heusen ===
In mid-December 2002, Calvin Klein Inc. (CKI) was sold to Phillips Van Heusen Corp (PVH), whose then CEO Bruce Klatsky was the driving force behind the deal, for about $400 million in cash, $30 million in stock as well as licensing rights and royalties linked to revenues over the following 15 years that were estimated at $200 to $300 million.

PVH outbid VF Corp., the maker of Lee and Wrangler jeans, which had also been interested in the jeans, underwear and swimwear business of CK that had been controlled by Warnaco Group, maker of Speedo swimwear in the US, since 1997. The deal with PVH did not include these businesses, and they remained with Warnaco. Unable to pay debts from acquisitions and licensing agreements and due to bad publicity by a later dismissed lawsuit with Calvin Klein over selling license products to retailers other than agreed upon with Calvin Klein, Warnaco had filed for chapter 11 protection in mid-2001 but eventually emerged from bankruptcy in February 2003.

The transaction between Calvin Klein and PVH was financially supported by Apax Partners Inc., a New York private equity firm, which is said to have made a $250 million equity investment in PVH convertible preferred stock, as well as a $125 million, two-year secured note, all in exchange for seats on the board of PVH.

Upon the acquisition of Calvin Klein, Phillips-Van Heusen announced plans of launching a new men's sportswear collection that rivals Ralph Lauren's collection. This line is produced by Van Heusen.

In a 2010 report, PVH, which manages the ready-to-wear activities, had estimated sales of over $5 billion for Calvin Klein products.

In February 2013, Warnaco Group was acquired by PVH for US$2.8 billion, which united Calvin Klein formal, underwear, jeans and sportswear lines.

In 2020, PVH announced that as part of their animal welfare policy, the company does not use exotic skins and would be banning their use in Calvin Klein collections when "our annual update of that policy is released."

== Product and brand history ==
The most visible brand names in the Calvin Klein portfolio include:

- Calvin Klein Collection (black label, upscale top-end designer line, renamed to "Calvin Klein 205W39NYC" in 2017, discontinued in 2019, revived in 2025)
- Ck Calvin Klein (grey label, recently repositioned as bridge collection line; licensed to Warnaco Group, Inc. through at least 2044. PVH acquired Warnaco Group in February 2013)
- Calvin Klein (white label, basic fashion better sportswear line)
- Calvin Klein Sport (sports version of the white label line for Macy's)
- Calvin Klein Jeans (denimwear line; licensed to Warnaco Group through at least 2044. PVH acquired Warnaco Group in February 2013)
- Calvin Klein Home (high-end bedding, towels, bath rugs and accessory collections)
- The Khaki Collection (youthful medium to high-end bedding, towels, bath rugs and accessories) discontinued in 2008
- Calvin Klein Golf (launched in late 2007)
- Calvin Klein Underwear (underwear collections; licensed to Warnaco Group through at least 2044. PVH acquired Warnaco Group in February 2013)
- CK one Lifestyle brand (fragrance, underwear, jeans—launched 2011)
- Calvin Klein Watches + Jewelry (watches launched in 1997, jewelry in 2004)

For details, see Current brands and licenses.

=== Fragrances ===
Calvin Klein has various lines of perfumes and colognes, including:

- Obsession for Men and Obsession for Women (1985): Amber fragrances created by Robert Slattery and Jean Guichard, respectively
- Eternity (1988): Floral fragrance created by Sophia Grojsman
- Escape (1991): Floral aquatic created by Claude Dir
- CK One (1994): Citrus fragrance created by Alberto Morillas and Harry Frémont
- CK be (1996): Woody floral musk created by René Morgenthaler
- Truth (2000): Woody amber created by Alberto Morillas, Jacques Cavallier Belletrud, and Thierry Wasser
- Reveal (2014): Woody floral musk created by Jean-Marc Chaillan and Bruno Jovanovic

Until May 2005, their perfumes and the corresponding fragrance lines were maintained by Calvin Klein Cosmetics Company (CKCC), a Unilever company. Cosmetics giant Coty, Inc. of New York bought the fragrance licensing agreements from Unilever.

=== Branding ===
Like other fashion brands, Calvin Klein established a monogram: the "ck" emblem.

=== Licensees ===
As of 2012, the top three licensees were:

- Warnaco Group – 40% of license royalties, which is "around $100 million"
- Coty – 12% of license royalties
- G-III Apparel Group – 14% of license royalties

== Designers ==
When Calvin Klein was acquired by PVH Corp. in 2003, Francisco Costa was appointed the Women's Creative Director of Calvin Klein Collection. Costa had already worked with Klein directly before the founder's departure from the company, and had taken the director position in 2003.

Italo Zucchelli, a former Jil Sander and Romeo Gigli designer, had collaborated with Calvin Klein for six seasons before he became head designer and Men's Creative Director of the Calvin Klein Collection menswear line in spring 2004.

In April 2016, it was announced that Francisco Costa and Italo Zucchelli would be leaving the company.

Raf Simons changed the logo in 2017, designed by Peter Saville. It was used until late 2020.

In August 2016, Calvin Klein, Inc. announced the appointment of Raf Simons as Chief Creative Officer of the brand, overseeing all aspects of design, global market and communications, and visual creative services. Simons assumed the creative strategy of the Calvin Klein brand globally across the company's ready to wear, bridge, sportswear, jeans, underwear and home lines. Pieter Mulier was also announced as Creative Director, reporting directly to Simons and responsible for executing his creative and design vision for men's and women's ready to wear, bridge and better apparel and accessories. It was also announced that Kevin Carrigan resigned from the company for a creative role at Ralph Lauren. Simons's first collections debuted for the Fall 2017 season.

In December 2016, it was announced that Amy Mellen would leave the company.

In January 2017, it was announced that Clémande Burgevin Blachman would assume the role of Vice President of Design for Calvin Klein Home.

In December 2018, it was announced that Raf Simons had parted from Calvin Klein after only two years at the company.

In November 2020, Jessica Lomax was appointed Global Head of Design, leading Calvin Klein's global design strategy and providing creative direction across all areas of the business.

In May 2024, Calvin Klein appointed Veronica Leoni Creative Director of the brand's newly revived Collection line. On 15 October 2026, Calvin Klein announced that Veronica Leoni would leave her role as creative director of Calvin Klein Collection after four seasons. Her final collection was presented in September 2026.

== Advertising and social media campaigns ==
=== Brand ambassadors ===
Calvin Klein has filmed advertising and social media campaigns with a network of celebrities, some of whom also serve as brand ambassadors. Their brand ambassadors include: Kendall Jenner, Jennie, Hailey and Justin Bieber, Disha Patani, Jung Ho-yeon, Bella Hadid, Kaia Gerber, Jungkook, Minji, Hanni, Danielle, Haerin and Hyein (as NewJeans and later NJZ) and, Mingyu.

=== Models ===
Calvin Klein has worked with numerous models on advertising and social media campaigns, including: Adwoa Aboah, Jourdan Dunn, Ashley Graham, Imaan Hammam, Karlie Kloss, Kelsey Merritt, Kate Moss, Simon Nessman, Sean O'Pry, Emily Ratajkowski, Brooke Shields, Lucky Blue Smith, and Liu Wen.

=== Athletes ===
Many female football stars like Alex Morgan, Chloe Kelly, and Mary Fowler have advertised their underwear.

== Locations ==
=== Stores ===
- Calvin Klein Collection

In the late 1990s, the company opened elegant Calvin Klein Collection stores in Paris, Seoul, and Taipei and ultra high-end cK Calvin Klein stores in Hong Kong, Milan, and Kuwait City. As of today, all stores are closed. Out of the two Calvin Klein Collection stores that existed in the US, the Dallas location in Highland Park Village which had been open for 20 years was closed in mid-2005. The only international location, in Paris, was closed by PVH in March 2006. The New York store, which serves as the company's flagship store at 654 Madison Ave., permanently closed in spring 2019. Partners maintain Calvin Klein Collection stores in Hong Kong, Shanghai, Mumbai, Seoul, Singapore, Kuala Lumpur, Bangkok, Dubai, and Qatar.

- Calvin Klein (white label)

Specialty retail Calvin Klein stores, designed by New York architecture firm Lynch/Eisinger/Design have been opened at Lenox Square in Atlanta, Beverly Center in Los Angeles; now closed down, Cherry Creek Mall in Denver; now closed down, Natick Collection in Natick, MA; closing down on July 25, 2010, The Mall at Partridge Creek in Michigan; now closed down, Aventura Mall in Aventura, Florida, South Coast Plaza in Costa Mesa California. An additional eight stores also designed by Lynch/Eisinger/Design are set to open in 2008. There are also several Calvin Klein Outlet stores, mostly located within factory outlet malls in the US, that sell the white label sportswear and sometimes the Calvin Klein white label at reduced prices but do not carry the Collection lines.

- Calvin Klein Jeans

Calvin Klein Jeans stores exist around the globe. Among many other countries in the United Kingdom, Germany, Greece, Russia, Brazil, Mexico, Colombia, Croatia, Egypt, Turkey, Chile, Argentina, India, the Philippines, Australia and New Zealand. They also offer franchise and opened in Cali, Colombia in 2022.

- Calvin Klein Underwear

Signature Calvin Klein Underwear boutiques can be found in Ljubljana, Buenos Aires, Bogotá, Cardiff (as of April 2011), Medellín, Mexico City, Edinburgh, Glasgow, Melbourne, Hong Kong, London, Manchester, Manila, New York City, Shanghai, Singapore, Frankfurt, Munich, Toronto, Hatfield, and Burnaby (Metro Vancouver).

- Department Stores

The major department stores in the US, including Macy's, Lord & Taylor, Dillard's, and Nordstrom, as well as many small independent stores carry the ck, white label and/or Jeans collections. Some high-end department stores, such as Bergdorf Goodman, Saks Fifth Avenue and Neiman Marcus also carry the Calvin Klein Collection. Notable retailers in the UK offering Calvin Klein include stores such as John Lewis, Debenhams and KJ Beckett. In Australia, the dominant retailer is Myer. Calvin Klein products are also found online with particular internet focus on selling Calvin Klein underwear and fragrance.

- Europe and Asia

In Europe, Calvin Klein is predominantly known for its underwear, accessories and perhaps the Collection business, rather than for the medium-priced sportswear lines which are available at select high-end retail stores. In Asia, there are also signature ck Calvin Klein stores that carry diffusion line, aka grey label including womenswear, menswear, accessories.

== Controversies ==
Brooke Shields in the infamous Calvin Klein Jeans campaign.

In 1980, Richard Avedon photographed and directed a Calvin Klein Jeans campaign that featured a fifteen-year-old Brooke Shields. Some of those advertisements were banned by some stations, including an infamous advert where Brooke asks, "D'you wanna know what comes between me and my Calvins? Nothing!," often misquoted as "Nothing comes between me and my Calvins."

The 1995 adverts promoting Calvin Klein jeans received criticism for being "kiddie porn".

In August 2012, Lululemon Athletica filed suit against Calvin Klein and supplier G-III Apparel Group for infringement of three Lululemon design patents for yoga pants. The lawsuit was somewhat unusual as it involved a designer seeking to assert intellectual property protection in clothing through patent rights. On November 20, 2012, Lululemon filed a notice of voluntary dismissal in the Delaware courts based upon a private settlement agreement reached between the parties that would dismiss the suit. According to a Lululemon press release, "Lululemon values its products and related IP rights and takes the necessary steps to protect its assets when we see attempts to mirror our products."

In 2014, Klein was criticized for the designation of Myla Dalbesio in its "Perfectly Fit" which offended many women as it is made for plus sizes.

In 2020, the Australian Strategic Policy Institute accused at least 82 major brands, including Calvin Klein, of being connected to forced Uyghur labor in Xinjiang.

== See also ==
- Sex in advertising
- Ralph Lauren Corporation
- Hugo Boss
- Tommy Hilfiger
- Desigual
