= Arrow (brand) =

American advertising image

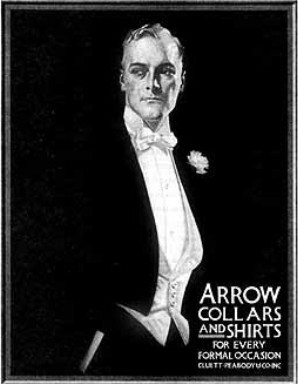
Arrow Collar ad by J. C. Leyendecker

Arrow is a direct-to-consumer brand of menswear owned by Authentic Brands Group and primarily vended by Amazon. The Arrow Collar Man was the historic marketing campaign running 1905–1931 featuring male models in shirts with detachable collars manufactured by Cluett Peabody & Company of Troy, New York.

== Advertisements ==
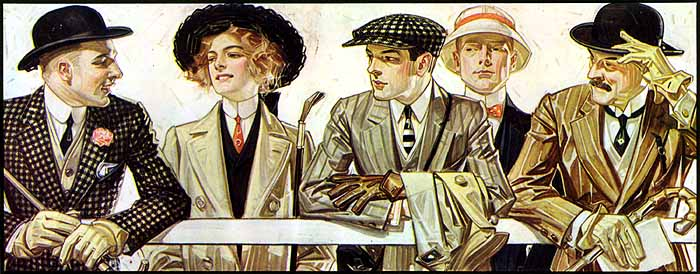
Illustration for Arrow Collar, 1907. J. C. Leyendecker.

The Arrow Collar ads were a collaborative production of New York ad agency Calkins and Holden; Cluett, Peabody advertising director Charles Connolly; and commercial illustrator J. C. Leyendecker. One of Leyendecker's models was his partner, a Canadian named Charles Beach. Another model was a young Huntley Gordon. According to Leyendecker himself, there were six men besides Beach who posed for the Arrow Collar ads: Jack Mulhall, Neil Hamilton, Robert Allen, Brian Donlevy, Mahlon Hamilton, and Reed Howes. Actor Earle Williams modeled the collars at the height of his fame in the World War One years.

Hundreds of printed advertisements were produced from 1907 to 1931 featuring the Arrow Collar Man. The fictional Arrow collar man became an icon and by 1920 was receiving fan mail. Fans would cut their favorite collar men out of advertisements and hang them on their wall. He inspired a Broadway musical Helen of Troy in 1923.

== Attached collars ==
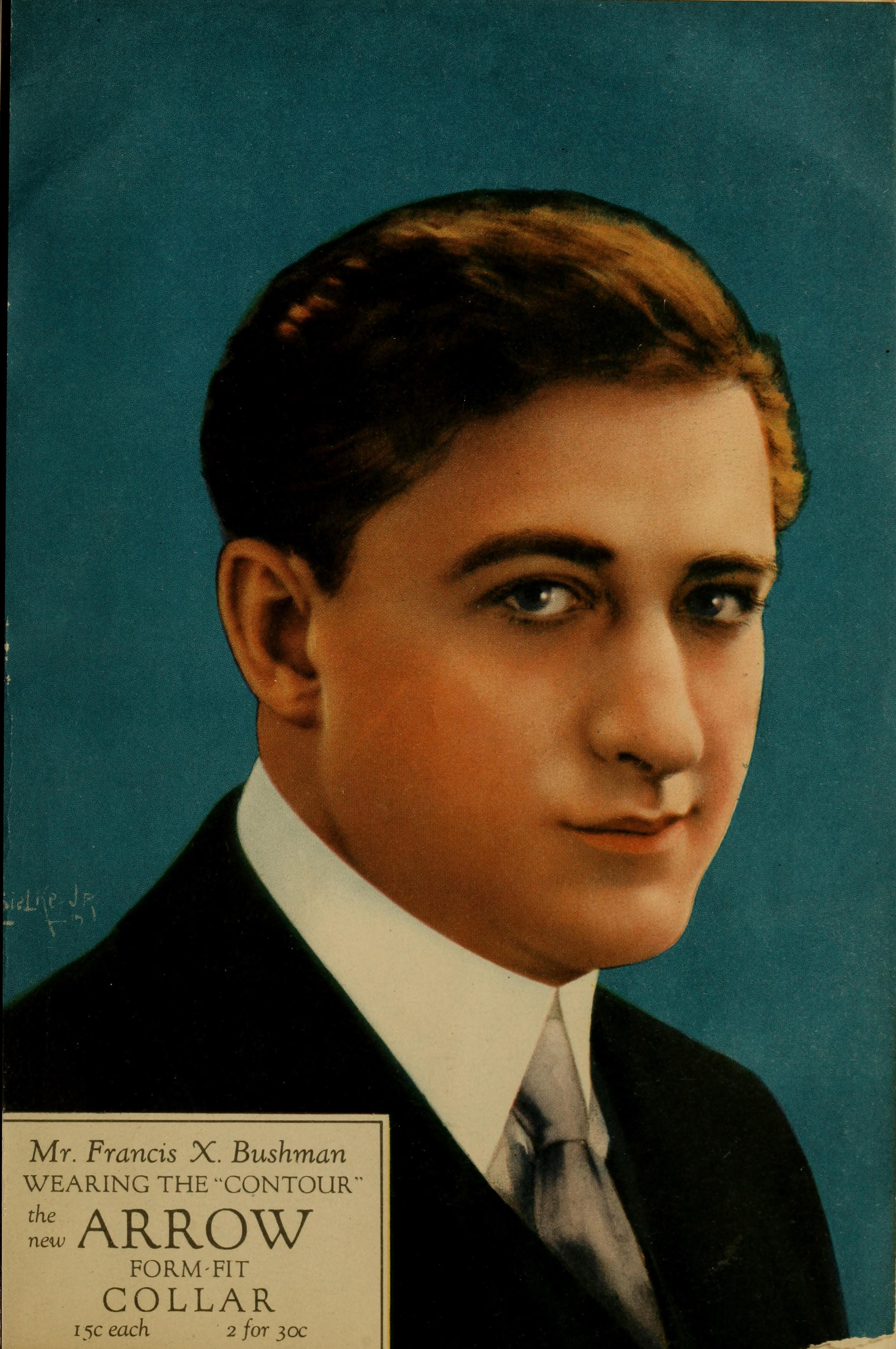
Movie star Francis X. Bushman on a 1917 collar ad

In the early 1920s, Cluett, Peabody & Co. began manufacturing their shirts with attached collars in response to consumer demand and became the most successful company in the U.S. at that time. Their sales increased to 4 million collars a week and Arrow shirts with attached collars were being exported to foreign ports such as Batavia (Jakarta) and the Belgian Congo. The Arrow Collar Man campaign ended in 1930, having been one of the most successful advertising campaigns in history.

== Recent history ==
In 2004, the Arrow brand was acquired by longtime competitor Philips-Van Heusen, owner of the Van Heusen brand. Under PVH, the Arrow brand was positioned as slightly less expensive than Van Heusen.

On June 23, 2021, it was announced that the Arrow brand would be sold to Authentic Brands Group alongside Van Heusen, Izod, and Geoffrey Beene. The sale was completed on August 2, 2021, with United Legwear & Apparel Company named as its licensee alongside the Van Heusen brand, and until 2023, the Geoffrey Beene brand.

The Arrow trademark is currently owned by Authentic Brands Group and is manufactured and marketed alongside Van Heusen by United Legwear & Apparel Company under a long-term licensing agreement. The primary retailer for the brand is Amazon. The brand was formerly sold by Sears, JCPenney, and Kohl's.

== In popular culture ==
- In the F. Scott Fitzgerald novel, The Great Gatsby (1925), Daisy Buchanan says to Gatsby, "You always look so cool. You resemble the advertisement of the man . . . you know, the advertisement of the man", which is understood to be a reference to the Arrow Collar Man.
- Lyrics from Irving Berlin song Puttin' on the Ritz include the line "High hats and Arrow collars..." in the 1946 version.
- Cole Porter referred to "Arrow Collars" in his song: "You're the Top" from the 1934 musical Anything Goes.
- Lyrics sung by Julie in F. S. Fitzgerald's comic one-act play Porcelain and Pink from the 1922 short story collection Tales of the Jazz Age include the lines "When the Arrow-collar man / Meets the Djer-Kiss girl".
- In Season 2 Episode 9 of 30 Rock, Jack Donaghy is described by Liz Lemon's father as "looking like an Arrow Shirt Model" after he's stunned by Jack's appearance.

== See also ==
- Retail apocalypse
- Dead mall
