= Calvin Klein Collection =

Calvin Klein designer line

Calvin Klein Collection (renamed Calvin Klein 205W39NYC in 2017 under Raf Simons) is the brand name for the high-end designer womenswear and menswear lines from fashion house Calvin Klein which were presented on the catwalks of New York Fashion Week and Milan Fashion Week, respectively.

Designer apparel, dresses, coats, dress shirts, eyewear, footwear and leather goods were sold under this 'black label' line which represented the top level in the brand pyramid of the various Calvin Klein brands.

On March 7, 2019, parent company PVH announced a focus on the numerous diffusion Calvin Klein brands and the discontinuation of the Calvin Klein 205W39NYC runway collections after the contract with designer Simons had been terminated.

In 2024, Veronica Leoni was appointed Creative Director of Calvin Klein Collection and charged with re-launching the line.

== Overview ==
Calvin Klein Collection was one of several Calvin Klein brands owned by Calvin Klein Inc., a wholly owned subsidiary of Phillips Van Heusen (PVH). PVH described the Collection as "the most prestigious and luxurious brand, setting the tone of elegance and modern sophistication for all of the other Calvin Klein brands."

Collection women's dresses retailed at about US$900–2,000 in the 1990s, but could cost up to $3,000 or more. A men's suit entered at around US$1,300. These prices were significantly higher than those for comparable, mass-produced items in the company's ck label, platinum label (for Europe & Asia only), white label (jeans, underwear, etc.) and sportswear lines.

Calvin Klein Collection clothing was traditionally presented bi-annually during New York Fashion Week (womenswear) and Milan Fashion Week (menswear). For the fall/winter 2009-10 shows at New York Fashion Week in February 2009, "as a one-off event" and at the occasion of the brand's 40th anniversary, Calvin Klein Collection menswear returned to New York City "after years of showing in Milan". The spring/summer 2010 collection was shown in Milan again as it had always been clear that “the brand plans to return to the runway in Milan for future shows”. Under Raf Simons and with the new name, referring to the address of the company's headquarters in New York, the women's and men's collections were combined into one show during New York Fashion Week.

The label sewn into the clothes used to be off-white with black characters until fall 2004. After that, it was black with a tonal logotype. The signature font did not change. From 2017 to 2019, it was a black label with the new name in white characters and capital letters (CALVIN KLEIN 205W39NYC).

== Licensing and Production ==
Before PVH decided in 2003 to license the Collection business, the design of Calvin Klein Collection had been managed out of the label's West 39th Street headquarters in New York City by Mr. Klein and his design staff, even though the pieces were European-produced. The worldwide license for the Collection was then held from 2003 by Vestimenta SpA, an Italian high-fashion manufacturer, whose bankruptcy led Fingen SpA of Italy (the parent of the licensees for Calvin Klein Jeanswear in Europe and Asia and ck Calvin Klein bridge apparel in Europe) to take over the license starting with the Spring 2006 line in the form of a subsidiary named CMI (Confezioni Moda Italia). In late 2005, the New York-based Warnaco Group, an apparel manufacturer that already cooperates with Calvin Klein in their sportswear and Jeans business on the US market, arranged to acquire the worldwide license from "Florence-based Fingen SpA for $286 million" for the 2008 to 2013 period. However, in December 2007 PVH took design and production duties for the collection back in-house to regain full control of the label and Warnaco instead received the rights to operate Calvin Klein Jeans retail stores in Europe, Asia and Latin America and ck Calvin Klein accessories stores in Europe and Latin America.

== Designers at Calvin Klein Collection ==
Before the house of Calvin Klein was sold to PVH in late 2002, Mr. Klein himself oversaw the design of the women's and men's collection. After the sale, he functioned as a creative consultant for a short time and was later released from all duties within the company.

The creative director for Calvin Klein Collection for women from 2003 to 2016 was Brazilian-born Francisco Costa, a former Gucci designer, who had already worked with Mr. Klein directly before the founder’s departure from the company. Italo Zucchelli, a former Jil Sander and Romeo Gigli designer, had worked as senior designer for menswear at Calvin Klein for six seasons before he served as creative director of the Calvin Klein Collection menswear line from spring 2004 until April 2016. Ulrich Grimm was the creative director of men’s and women’s Collection shoes and accessories.

On August 2, 2016, Calvin Klein, Inc. announced the appointment of Raf Simons as Chief Creative Officer of the brand.

During his tenure, Simons led the creative strategy of the Calvin Klein brand globally across the Calvin Klein Collection, Calvin Klein Platinum, Calvin Klein, Calvin Klein Jeans, Calvin Klein Underwear and Calvin Klein Home brands. As part of his role as Chief Creative Officer, Simons oversaw all aspects of design, global marketing and communications, and visual creative services. Simons’ first collections debuted for the fall/winter 2017 season.

The arrival of Raf Simons as Chief Creative Officer signified “a momentous new chapter for Calvin Klein”, said Steve Shiffman, CEO of Calvin Klein, Inc. Simons' work was a departure from the designs of prior seasons. For his designs, Simons entered into many costly collaborations, such as the Andy Warhol and Robert Mapplethorpe estates. Simons' designs created media attention and were applauded by fashion critics, yet failed to sell well. His contract was ended in December 2018 after internal disagreements over the strategic alignment of the Calvin Klein brand and its overall image. PVH announced in early March 2019 the discontinuation of the runway collections. In late March 2019, PVH's CEO announced rising revenue at Calvin Klein after Simons' departure.

In 2024, PVH announced the appointment of Veronica Leoni as Creative Director of Calvin Klein Collection. She has previously worked for labels such as Jill Sander and The Row, and runs her own brand Quira. She will return the brand to the runway in the fall/winter 2025 season.

When presented, on February 7th of 2025, Calvin Klein Collection Fall 2025 did not generate as much financial success as they had in previous shows when they returned to the runway. After a ~6 hiatus, Leoni returned to reliable silhouettes and faces; It was a marketably good return which received acclaim contributed to a revival for the brand.

== Calvin Klein Collection Advertising ==
The Calvin Klein Collection advertisements used two "house/signature" models every season (one male, one female) to advertise the brand, in addition to modeling on the runway. Models for past seasons include Kate Moss, Christy Turlington, Natalia Vodianova, Toni Garrn, Suvi Koponen, and Andrew Stetson.

For Fall 2010, Lara Stone was exclusively signed for the women's apparel advertising campaigns for Calvin Klein Collection, as well as ck Calvin Klein and Calvin Klein Jeans.

== Calvin Klein Collection stores ==
From 2006 up until the brand's discontinuation in 2019 PVH operated only one store under the Calvin Klein Collection label in the U.S.:

- 654 Madison Ave., New York (flagship store; opened in 1995, closed in 2019)

The Paris store at 53, Avenue Montaigne, originally opened in 1997, closed in March 2006 because PVH decided it was unprofitable. It was the label's only international signature outlet directly owned by PVH. A third directly owned store in Dallas' Highland Park was closed after 20 years in January 2006 for the same above-mentioned reason. There were other international locations, such as London, Paris, Madrid, Barcelona, Milan, Dubai, Hong Kong, Singapore, Shenyang, Shanghai, Bangkok, Kuala Lumpur and Macau where Calvin Klein Collection stores or shop-in-shops could be found that were maintained by partners.
