= Jimmy Van Heusen =

American composer (1913–1990)

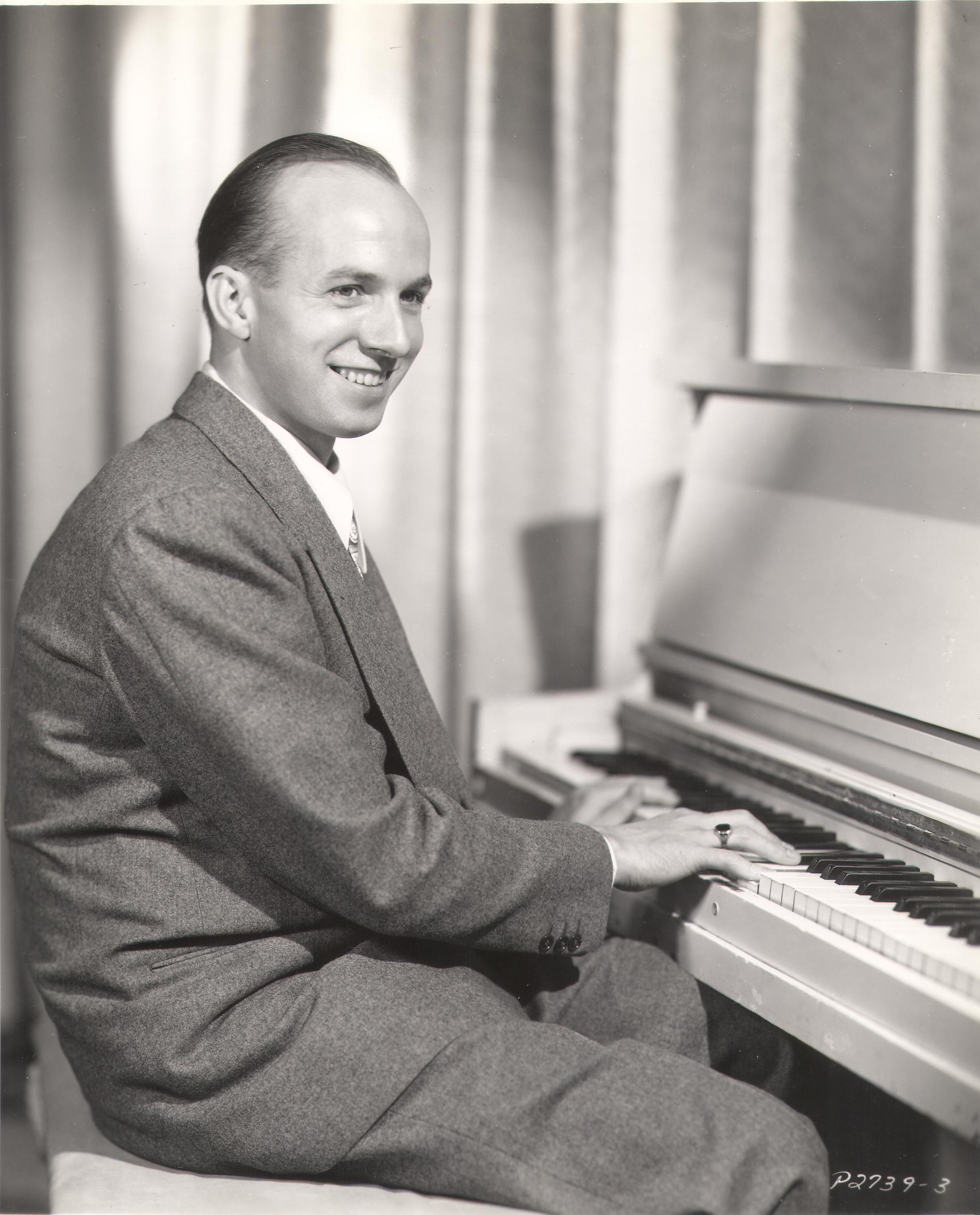
- Van Heusen playing the piano

Background information
- Born: Edward Chester Babcock; January 26, 1913; Syracuse, New York, U.S.
- Died: February 6, 1990 (aged 77) Rancho Mirage, California, U.S.
- Genre: Popular music
- Occupations: Songwriter, pianist
- Years active: Mid 1930s–late 1970s

James Van Heusen (born Edward Chester Babcock; January 26, 1913 – February 6, 1990) was an American composer. He wrote songs for films, television, and theater, and won an Emmy and four Academy Awards for Best Original Song. Many of his compositions later went on to become jazz standards.

== Life and career ==
Born in Syracuse, New York, Edward Chester Babcock began writing music while in high school. He renamed himself to Jimmy Van Heusen at age 16, after the shirt makers Phillips-Van Heusen, to use as his on-air name during local shows. His close friends called him "Chet". Van Heusen was raised Methodist.

Studying at Cazenovia Seminary and Syracuse University, he became friends with Jerry Arlen, the younger brother of Harold Arlen. With the elder Arlen's help, Van Heusen wrote songs for the Cotton Club revue, including "Harlem Hospitality". He then became a staff pianist for some of the Tin Pan Alley publishers, and wrote "It's the Dreamer in Me" (1938) with lyrics by Jimmy Dorsey. Collaborating with lyricist Eddie DeLange, on songs such as "Heaven Can Wait", "So Help Me", and "Darn That Dream", he became more prolific, writing over 60 songs in 1940 alone. It was in 1940 that he teamed up with the lyricist Johnny Burke. Burke and Van Heusen moved to Hollywood and wrote for stage musicals and films throughout the 1940s and early 1950s, winning an Academy Award for Best Original Song for "Swinging on a Star" (1944). Their songs were featured in many Bing Crosby films of the era, including some of the Road installments and A Connecticut Yankee in King Arthur's Court (1949).

He also was a pilot of some accomplishment; he met Joe Hornsby, who worked for the FAA in Los Angeles (Hornsby was the son of Dan Hornsby and the father of Nikki Hornsby), because his music career coincided with his interest in flying. Joe Hornsby sponsored Van Heusen into an exclusive pilots club called the Quiet Birdmen which held meetings at Proud Bird restaurant at LAX; this friendship endured until Hornsby and his wife Dorothea died in short succession the late 1970s. Van Heusen remained close friends with Nikki Hornsby until his own death. Using his birth name, Van Heusen also worked as a part-time test pilot for Lockheed Corporation during World War II.

Van Heusen then teamed up with lyricist Sammy Cahn. Their three Academy Awards for Best Song were won for "All the Way" (1957) from The Joker Is Wild, "High Hopes" (1959) from A Hole in the Head, and "Call Me Irresponsible" (1963) from Papa's Delicate Condition. Their songs were also featured in Ocean's Eleven (1960), which included Dean Martin's version of "Ain't That a Kick in the Head", and in Robin and the 7 Hoods (1964), in which Frank Sinatra sang the Oscar-nominated "My Kind of Town".

Cahn and Van Heusen also wrote "Love and Marriage" (1955), "To Love and Be Loved", "Come Fly with Me", "Only the Lonely", and "Come Dance with Me" with many of their compositions being the title songs for Frank Sinatra's albums of the late 1950s.

Van Heusen wrote the music for five Broadway musicals: Swingin' the Dream (1939); Nellie Bly (1946), Carnival in Flanders (1953), Skyscraper (1965), and Walking Happy (1966). While Van Heusen did not achieve nearly the success on Broadway that he did in Hollywood, at least two songs from Van Heusen musicals can legitimately be considered standards: "Darn That Dream" from Swingin' the Dream; and "Here's That Rainy Day" from Carnival in Flanders.

He was inducted into the Songwriters Hall of Fame in 1971.

Van Heusen composed over 1,000 songs, of which 50 became standards. His songs are featured in over 726 films and tv shows.

== Personal life ==
Van Heusen was known to be quite popular among women. He said, "I took song writing seriously when I discovered girls". James Kaplan in his book Frank: The Voice (2010) wrote, "He played piano beautifully, wrote gorgeously poignant songs about romance... he had a fat wallet, he flew his own plane; he never went home alone". Angie Dickinson once said of Van Heusen: "You would not pick him over Clark Gable any day, but his magnetism was irresistible". Referring to the composer's virility, lyricist Sammy Cahn said, "Sinatra thought he was Van Heusen, but he couldn't pass the physical".

In his 20s, he began to shave his head when he started losing his hair, a practice ahead of its time. He once said "I would rather write songs than do anything else – even fly". Kaplan also reported that he was a "hypochondriac of the first order" who kept a Merck manual at his bedside, injected himself with vitamins and painkillers, and had surgical procedures for ailments real and imagined.

It was Van Heusen who rushed Sinatra to the hospital after Sinatra, in despair over the breakup of his marriage to Ava Gardner, slashed one of his wrists in a suicide attempt in November 1953. However, that event was never mentioned by Van Heusen in any radio or print interviews given by him. Van Heusen himself married for the first time in 1969, at age 56, to Bobbe Brock, originally one of the Brox Sisters and widow of the producer Bill Perlberg.

=== Death ===
Van Heusen retired in the late 1970s and died in 1990 in Rancho Mirage, California, from complications following a stroke at the age of 77. Van Heusen is buried near the Sinatra family in Desert Memorial Park, in Cathedral City, California.

== Academy Awards ==
Van Heusen was nominated for the Academy Award for Best Song 14 times in 12 different years (in both 1945 and 1964 he was nominated for two songs), and won four times: in 1944, 1957, 1959, and 1963.

Wins

- 1944 – "Swinging on a Star" (lyrics by Johnny Burke) for Going My Way
- 1957 – "All the Way" (lyrics by Sammy Cahn) for The Joker Is Wild
- 1959 – "High Hopes" (lyrics by Sammy Cahn) for A Hole in the Head
- 1963 – "Call Me Irresponsible" (lyrics by Sammy Cahn) for Papa's Delicate Condition

Nominations

- 1945 – "Sleigh Ride in July" (lyrics by Johnny Burke) from the film Belle of the Yukon
- 1945 – "Aren't You Glad You're You?" (lyrics by Johnny Burke) from the film Bells of St. Mary's
- 1955 – "(Love Is) The Tender Trap" (lyrics by Sammy Cahn) introduced by Frank Sinatra and Debbie Reynolds in the film The Tender Trap
- 1958 – "To Love and Be Loved" (lyrics by Sammy Cahn) for the film Some Came Running
- 1960 – "The Second Time Around" (lyrics by Sammy Cahn) for the film High Time
- 1961 – "Pocketful of Miracles" (lyrics by Sammy Cahn) for the film Pocketful of Miracles
- 1964 – "Where Love Has Gone" (lyrics by Sammy Cahn) for the film Where Love Has Gone.
- 1964 – "My Kind of Town" (lyrics by Sammy Cahn) for the film Robin and the 7 Hoods
- 1967 – "Thoroughly Modern Millie" (lyrics by Sammy Cahn) for the film Thoroughly Modern Millie
- 1968 – "Star" (lyrics by Sammy Cahn) for the film Star!

== Emmy Award ==
He won one Emmy Award for Best Musical Contribution, for the song "Love and Marriage" (1955) (lyrics by Sammy Cahn), written for the 1955 Producers' Showcase production of Our Town.

== Other awards ==
He was nominated for a Grammy Award in 1965 for Best Musical Score Written for a Motion Picture or TV show for Robin and the Seven Hoods.

He was also nominated for three Tony awards:

- Best Musical in 1966 for Skyscraper
- Best Musical in 1967 for Walking Happy
- Best Composer and Lyricist in 1967 Walking Happy

He was nominated three times for a Golden Globe Award.

- 1965 – "Where Love Has Gone" (lyrics by Sammy Cahn) for the film Where Love Has Gone
- 1968 – "Thoroughly Modern Millie" (lyrics by Sammy Cahn) for the film Thoroughly Modern Millie.
- 1969 – "Star" (lyrics by Sammy Cahn) for the film Star!.

He won a Christopher Award in 1955 for the song "Love and Marriage".

== Namesakes ==
- Bob Hope's character in The Road to Hong Kong (1962) is named Chester Babcock, in reference to Van Heusen's birth name.

== Songs ==
=== With lyricist Sammy Cahn ===
- "Ain't That a Kick in the Head"
- "All For One and One For All"
- "All My Tomorrows"
- "All the Way"
- "The Auction"
- "Bang! Bang!"
- "B-R-A-N-E"
- "Buckskin Beauty"
- "California"
- "Call Me Irresponsible"
- "Cha Cha Choo Choo"
- "Charlotte Couldn't Charleston"
- "Clog and Grog"
- "Come Blow Your Horn"
- "Come Dance with Me"
- "Come Fly with Me"
- "Come on Strong"
- "Come Waltz with Me"
- "Don't Worry"
- "Eee-O Eleven"
- "An Elephant Never Forgets"
- "Everybody Has the Right to Be Wrong!"
- "A Faraway Land"
- "The Gaiety"
- "The Girl Most Likely to Succeed"
- "Haute Couture"
- "H-E-A-R-T"
- "High Hopes"
- "The Horse on the Carousel"
- "How Are Ya' Fixed For Love?"
- "How D'ya Talk to a Girl"
- "I Couldn't Care Less"
- "I Don't Think I'm In Love"
- "I Like to Lead When I Dance"
- "I Wouldn't Trade Christmas"
- "I'll Make a Man of the Man"
- "I'll Only Miss Her When I Think of Her"
- "If I Be Your Best Chance"
- "If You're Gonna be A Witch, Be A Witch"
- "The Impatient Years"
- "Incurably Romantic"
- "Indiscreet"
- "It Gets Lonely Early"
- "It Might As Well Be Her"
- "It's Nice to Go Trav'ling"
- "A Joyful Thing"
- "Keep a Happy Thought"
- "The Last Dance"
- "Let's Make Love"
- "Local 403"
- "The Look of Love"
- "Look to Your Heart"
- "Love and Marriage"
- "(Love Is) The Tender Trap"
- "The Man with the Golden Arm"
- "Me 'n You 'n the Moon"
- "More Than One Way"
- "Mr. Booze"
- "My Kind of Town"
- "N-E-R-V-E"
- "The Night That Rock and Roll Died"
- "Nobody's Perfect"
- "Nothing in Common" (with Keely Smith)
- "Occasional Flight of Fancy"
- "An Old-Fashioned Christmas"
- "Only the Lonely"
- "Opposites"
- "Our Town"
- "Pardners"
- "People Who Are Nice"
- "Pocketful Of Miracles"
- "Return to the Land of Oz"
- "Ring-a-Ding Ding!"
- "Run For Your Life!"
- "The Same Old Song and Dance" (with Bobby Worth)
- "Say One for Me"
- "The Second Best Secret Agent in the Whole Wide World"
- "The Second Time Around"
- "The Secret of Christmas"
- "The September of My Years"
- "Sleigh Ride in July"
- "Spare That Building"
- "Specialization"
- "Star!"
- "Style"
- "Such a Sociable Sort"
- "The Tapioca"
- "That Feeling for Home"
- "There's Love and There's Love and There's Love"
- "They Came to Cordura"
- "Think of Something Else"
- "Thoroughly Modern Millie"
- "To Love and Be Loved"
- "Use Your Noggin"
- "Walking Happy"
- "What Makes It Happen"
- "When Somebody Loves You"
- "When No One Cares"
- "Where Love Has Gone"
- "Where Was I"
- "Who Was That Lady?"
- "The Wind! The Wind!"
- "Wrong!"
- "You Can't Love Them All"
- "You Have Only You"
- "You Never Had It So Good"
- "You're Right, You're Right"

=== With lyricist Johnny Burke ===
- "Aren't You Glad You're You?"
- "But Beautiful"
- "Busy Doing Nothing"
- "Going My Way"
- "Here's That Rainy Day" (from Carnival in Flanders)
- "Imagination"
- "It Could Happen to You"
- "It's Always You"
- "It's Anybody's Spring"
- "Like Someone in Love"
- "Life Is So Peculiar"
- "Moonlight Becomes You"
- "Oh, You Crazy Moon"
- "Personality"
- "Polka Dots and Moonbeams"
- "Sunday, Monday, or Always"
- "Swinging on a Star"
- "That Christmas Feeling"
- "Welcome To My Dream"
- "(We're Off on the) Road to Morocco"
- "You Lucky People You"
- "You May Not Love Me"
- "A Friend Of Yours"
- "You're In Love With Someone"

=== With lyricist Eddie DeLange ===
- "All I Remember Is You"
- "All This and Heaven Too"
- "Darn That Dream"
- "Deep in a Dream"
- "Heaven Can Wait"
- "I'm Good for Nothing (But Love)"
- "Shake Down the Stars"
- "So Help Me"

=== With others ===
- "Blue Rain" (lyrics by Johnny Mercer)
- "Far Away" (lyrics by David Kapp)
- "I Could Have Told You" (lyrics by Carl Sigman)
- "I Thought About You" (lyrics by Johnny Mercer)
- "It's the Dreamer in Me" (lyrics by Jimmy Van Heusen; music by Jimmy Dorsey)
- "Nancy (With the Laughing Face)" (lyrics by Phil Silvers)
- "Not as a Stranger" (lyrics by Buddy Kaye)
- "Sha-Sha" King / Kutz (minor hit for The Andrews Sisters and Jimmy Dorsey 1938)

=== Independent ===
- "It's 1200 miles from Palm Springs to Texas"
