= Lakeland (company) =

British kitchenware store chain

Lakeland Limited
- Formerly: Lakeland Plastics (Windermere) Limited (1964–1991); Lakeland Plastics Ltd. (1991–1997)
- Type: Private
- Industry: Kitchenware
- Founded: 1956 in Windermere
- Headquarters: Windermere, Cumbria, England
- Key people: Sam Rayner (Chairman of the board); Steve Knights (CEO)
- Products: Cookware; Bakeware; Speciality Food
- Owner: Hilco Capital
- Website: lakeland.co.uk

Lakeland Limited is a chain of British kitchenware stores in the United Kingdom. It is still based where it was founded in Windermere in the Lake District, the area the company is named after.

== History ==
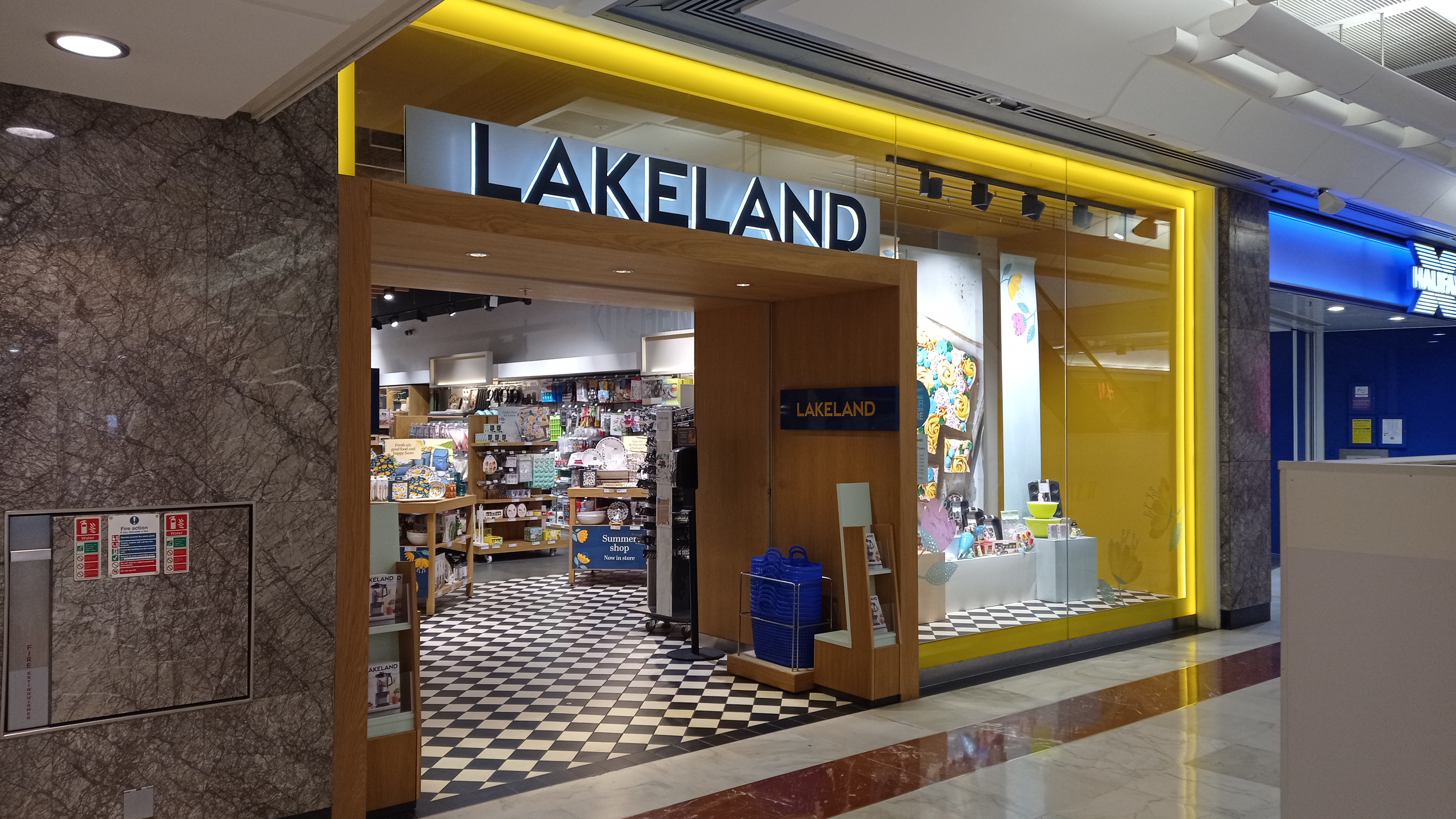
Lakeland at Brent Cross Shopping Centre, 2022

Alan Rayner, an agricultural feed salesman, had the idea of providing local farmers with polythene bags for packing poultry. He set up a mail order business with his wife Dorothy, supplying agricultural plastics and home-freezing products from the garage of their Windermere home in the Lake District. The company became Lakeland Plastics and sold a range of farming accessories and freezer bags.

In 1974, Alan retired and his three sons Martin, Sam and Julian took over. The range of products grew to include wooden, glass, ceramic and stainless steel kitchenware, as well as a range of specialty foods while the agricultural product range was reduced.

In 1997, Lakeland Plastics changed its name to Lakeland Limited to reflect its changing product lines. In 2007, the Limited tag was dropped, although it remains part of the company's legal name. This change was part of a wider rebranding by the company to create a more contemporary look in its retail outlets.

== Current business ==
Lakeland Windermere store and head office

The Lakeland Head Office is now based in Windermere at Alexandra Buildings with its distribution centre on the Shap Road industrial estate in Kendal. Lakeland has around 4,000 products in its range and produces around 18 catalogues each year which are posted to its customers or picked up in store. They reflect the company's main target for customers; home kitchenware, solutions for the home, garden accessories and seasonal.

Lakeland's retail outlets have also expanded. There are now 55 Lakeland stores including its flagship store next to its Windermere head office.

Lakeland have been eyeing an expansion into the Middle East since March 2010, opening their first store in 2010 in Mirdif Centre mall in Dubai. Subsequently by 2011 two more stores were established, one in Bahrain followed by another opening in Qatar by early March 2011.

On 17th April 2025, Lakeland was sold to Hilco Capital for an undisclosed sum.
