= Jamie Salter =

Jamie Salter may refer to:

- Jamie Salter (businessman), American business executive
- Jamie Salter (swimmer), British swimmer
- Jamie Salter (Black Mirror), a character in the TV series

== See also ==
- James Salter (disambiguation)
