= ISOD =

ISOD may refer to:

- International Sports Federation of the Disabled, former name of the International Wheelchair and Amputee Sports Federation
- Intelligence Special Operations Division, a former division of the National Bureau of Investigation, Philippines
- Insulated shutter opening device, a plastic pin on a UK electrical plug

== See also ==
- Izod, a clothing manufacturer
