= Jamie Salter (businessman) =

Canadian businessman

- Born: March 17, 1963 (age 63); Toronto, Ontario, Canada
- Education: California State University at Long Beach, Long Beach City College, Carleton University
- Occupation: Businessman
- Known for: Founder, executive chairman Authentic Brands Group
- Children: 4

Jamie Salter (born 1963) is a Canadian billionaire businessman. He is the founder and executive chairman of Authentic Brands Group, an American sports, media, entertainment and lifestyle platform headquartered in New York City. Its holdings include fashion, athletics, and entertainment brands, which it licenses to operating partners around the world. Authentic owns more than 50 consumer brands, as well as the likeness rights or estates of celebrities, including Elvis Presley, Marilyn Monroe, Shaquille O’Neal, David Beckham and Kevin Hart.

Before founding Authentic Brands Group, Salter co-founded the snowboard manufacturer Ride Inc. (which went public on the Nasdaq in 1994) before stepping down as CEO in 1996. He went on to found Gen-X and was the CEO of Global Sports Inc. He then co-founded and was CEO of Hilco Consumer Capital. Salter founded Authentic in 2010 with investment from private equity firm Leonard Green & Partners. He was chief executive officer of Authentic Brands Group from its founding in 2010 until 2026, when he transitioned to executive chairman and appointed Matthew Maddox as president and chief executive officer.

== Early life and education ==
Salter is a native of Toronto, Canada. When he was 17, Salter moved to Palm Springs, California, with his parents and two brothers. He finished high school in California and then studied business at California State University, Long Beach. He transferred to Long Beach City College for his sophomore year, then later transferred to Carleton University in Ottawa, Canada.

== Career ==
Salter began his career marketing sporting goods during the 1980s. In 1992, he co-founded the snowboard manufacturer Ride Inc., which became publicly traded on the Nasdaq in 1994. Salter stepped down as the company's CEO in 1996. Salter went on to found Gen-X Sports, which he built into a diversified sporting goods company. In 1998, Gen-X was acquired by Global Sports Inc. Salter co-founded Global Sports Inc. with Michael Rubin and was president. The company rebranded as GSI Commerce and subsequently acquired Fanatics.

Salter was the co-founder and CEO of Hilco Consumer Capital, the private equity unit of Hilco Trading LLC, which he helped start in December 2006. He left Hilco in 2010 to start his own company, Authentic Brands Group.

== Awards and philanthropy ==
In 2022, Salter was named Brand Builder of the Year by MR Magazine.

In 2024, Salter was recognized by the National Father's Day Council with a Father of the Year award.

Under his leadership, Authentic Brands Group was named Company of the Year by Footwear News, which also included Salter on its Power 100 list of the most influential figures in the footwear industry.

In 2025, Salter was recognized as an honoree for the Time 100 Impact award. The awards recognize global leaders who have made significant business and cultural impact.

Salter is an active philanthropist of the Mount Sinai Hospital in his hometown of Toronto and is a board member of the Muhammad Ali Center. In 2018, Salter was honored for his charitable contributions to the nonprofit organization Delivering Good. Salter was also honored by the Foreseeable Future Foundation at its inaugural Seeing Past Sight fundraiser.

== Personal life ==
Salter and his wife, Sheryl, married in 1986. They have four sons, all of whom work for Authentic Brands Group. His son Corey Salter is president of Entertainment and International for Authentic Brands Group.

He resides in London, England, and he has a Canadian vacation home in Muskoka, Ontario.
