= Authentic Brands Group =

American brand development and licensing company

Authentic Brands Group LLC
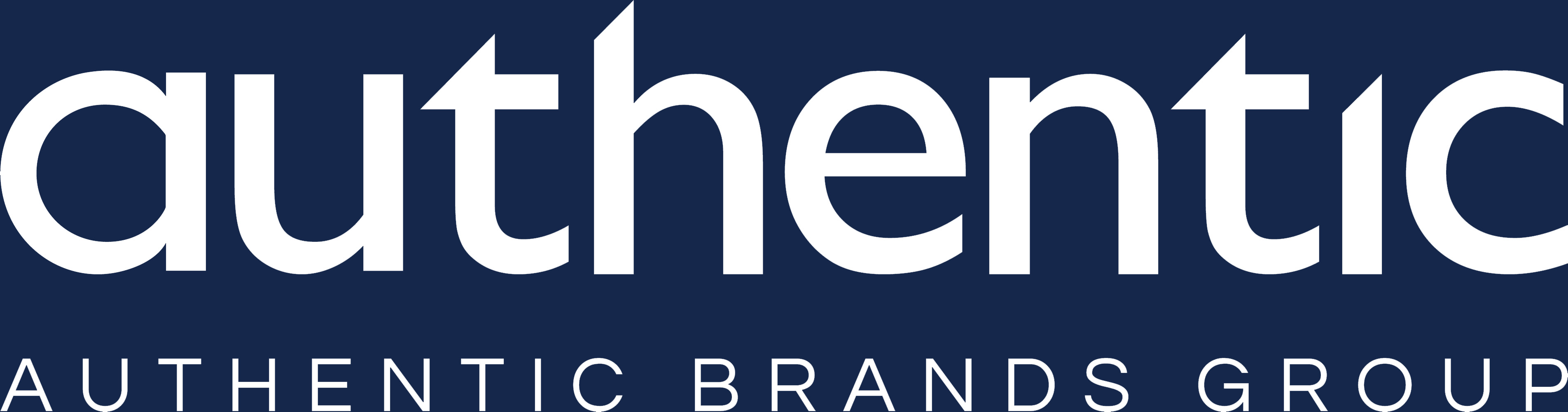
- Type: Private
- Industry: entertainment; sports; intellectual property
- Founded: 2010; 16 years ago
- Headquarters: 1411 Broadway, New York City, United States
- Key people: Jamie Salter (Founder and Executive Chairman); Matt Maddox (CEO); Lark-Marie Antón (CCO)
- Brands: List of brands
- Owners: CVC Capital Partners; HPS Investment Partners; Leonard Green & Partners; General Atlantic
- Website: corporate.authentic.com

Authentic Brands Group LLC (Authentic) is an American sports, media, entertainment and lifestyle platform headquartered in New York City. Its holdings include various fashion, athletics, and entertainment brands, which it licenses to operating partners around the world. Authentic owns more than 50 consumer brands, as well as the likeness rights or estates of celebrities, including Muhammad Ali, Elvis Presley, and Marilyn Monroe.

== History ==
=== Origins and early work ===
The company was founded in 2010 by Jamie Salter, a Canadian entrepreneur known for founding, acquiring and building brand companies. Before launching Authentic, Salter co-founded Ride Inc., a snowboard company that became publicly traded on Nasdaq in 1994. He later was CEO of Hilco Consumer Capital, a business focused on acquiring and restructuring consumer brands.

After leaving Hilco Capital in 2010, Jamie co-founded Authentic Brands Group.The majority of the equity was sold to Leonard Green & Partners, who invested $250 million in the new venture. Two of Authentic's first major purchases were the clothing brands Silver Star and Tapout. In January 2011, Authentic Brands Group acquired rights to the likeness of Marilyn Monroe.

=== 2010s ===
In October 2013, Authentic announced the purchase of Juicy Couture from Fifth & Pacific for US$195 million. The following month, Authentic acquired the estate of Muhammad Ali, and CORE Media Group's 85% stake in Elvis Presley Enterprises (which includes the estate of Elvis Presley, likeness rights, and music publishing assets).

In December 2015, basketball player Shaquille O'Neal signed with Authentic to manage his likeness and marketing rights. In September 2016, Julius Erving also sold his name and licensing rights to Authentic, and Aéropostale was purchased out of bankruptcy by a consortium that included Authentic and other investors.

In March 2017, Authentic became the controlling partner of Greg Norman's consumer products business.

In March 2018, Authentic announced that they would acquire Nautica from VF Corporation. On June 10, 2018, Authentic announced that it was the winning bidder for the intellectual property of Nine West Holdings. The acquisition was completed on July 3, 2018. On October 10, 2018, Authentic announced that it had entered into an agreement to purchase a majority stake in the intellectual property of the Camuto Group's proprietary brands in partnership with DSW Inc.

In May 2019, Authentic announced its acquisition of sports magazine Sports Illustrated from Meredith Corporation for US$110 million. The company stated it planned to leverage its trademarks and other non-core assets in new ventures. Meredith will continue to publish the Sports Illustrated magazine and digital properties under license for at least two years. On June 18, 2019, it was announced that rights to publish the Sports Illustrated editorial operations would be licensed to The Maven under a 10-year deal, with Ross Levinsohn as CEO. In August 2019, BlackRock became the largest shareholder in Authentic Brands.

In April 2019, the Kering group sold the Volcom brand to Authentic Brands Group.

=== 2020s ===
In May 2020, Authentic and David Glasser's 101 Studios formed a joint venture, Sports Illustrated Studios, for feature film and television projects. The joint venture would have a slate of several TV series and films per year. The first announced project was the Covers two-hour docuseries based on the magazine's cover stories.

In August 2020, it was announced that Brooks Brothers was sold to Authentic and Simon Property Group, the biggest mall operator in the US. The new owners committed to continuing to operate at least 125 Brooks Brothers retail locations worldwide (down from 424 global locations before the COVID-19 pandemic).

In June 2021, it was announced that Authentic would acquire the Izod, Van Heusen, Arrow, and Geoffrey Beene brands from PVH.

In July 2021, Authentic filed for an estimated US$1.5 billion initial public offering. In November 2021, Authentic withdrew its IPO, selling private stake in the company to CVC Capital, HPS Investment Partners, and other current stakeholders at a company value of $12.7 billion.

In August 2021, it was announced that Authentic would be acquiring the sports clothing brand Reebok from Adidas for at least US$2.5 billion in a deal expected to close in the first quarter of 2022. Private equity companies CVC Capital Partners and HPS Investment Partners invested $3.5 billion in Authentic in a deal that closed in November 2021. Authentic announced they would delay the IPO until 2023 or 2024.

In May 2022, Authentic entered a strategic partnership with David Beckham to co-own and manage the David Beckham brand. Through the acquisition, Authentic also became the largest shareholder in Studio 99, a creative and production studio co-founded by Beckham in 2019.

In April 2023, Authentic made a binding offer to acquire Boardriders, Inc. for US$1.25 billion. Boardriders includes the Quiksilver, Billabong, Roxy, RVCA, DC Shoes, Element, Von Zipper and Honolua brands, as well as the retailer Surf Dive 'n Ski.

In January 2024, Authentic Brands Group, which had bought Sports Illustrated for $110 million from Meredith in 2019, terminated the agreement it holds with The Arena Group to publish, leading to all Sports Illustrated staffers being laid off. In March 2024, Authentic Brands Group relicensed Sports Illustrated to Minute Media; the company planned to rehire some of the affected employees.

In January 2024, Wolverine World Wide announced the sale of Sperry to Authentic Brands Group who in turn is licensing the brand to the Aldo Group for North American operations. In June 2024, Hanesbrands announced plans to sell the Champion brand to Authentic Brands for $1.2 billion.

In May 2025, Levi Strauss agreed to sell Dockers to Authentic Brands Group for $311 million.

In June 2025, Authentic launched its live events division, Authentic Live, to produce in-person events as part of its broader media and marketing operations. In 2025, 65,000 consumers attended its events

In January 2026, Authentic announced a strategic partnership with comedian and entrepreneur Kevin Hart to co-own and manage the Kevin Hart Brand. Later that month, Authentic completed the acquisition of a majority stake in fashion brand Guess, valuing the company at approximately $1.4 billion. The transaction made Guess Authentic's second-largest brand after Reebok and increased Authentic's total annual retail sales across its portfolio to about $38 billion globally.

On May 21, 2026, Kontoor Brands announced the sale of Lee Jeans to Authentic for $750 million plus up to $250 million depending on the brand's performance in the future. The acquisition was completed on November 3, 2026. Following the acquisition, Authentic established operating partnerships for Lee in the United States, Canada, Europe, China, and Mexico, and planned to expand the brand into activewear and workwear.

In June 2026, it was announced that Authentic Brands will acquire the intellectual property of Care Bears from Cloudco Entertainment. On August 20, 2026, the acquisition was completed.

On August 27, 2026, Authentic announced it had acquired a majority stake in the intellectual property of October's Very Own (OVO), the premium lifestyle brand co-founded by Drake, with Drake maintaining a significant ownership stake.

In October 2026, Authentic sued Anthropic, alleging that the company used Elvis Presley’s copyrighted lyrics without permission to train its AI models and generated versions of his songs that infringed copyrights to 274 songs without any license or payment.

== Portfolio ==
Name	Type	Year acquired	Notes
Above the Rim	Clothing brand	2014	
Aéropostale	Clothing retailer	2016	Clothing
Airwalk	Clothing brand	2014	
Billabong	Clothing brand	2023	
Muhammad Ali	Personal brand	2013	
Arrow	Clothing brand	2021	
Bandolino	Luxury fashion	2018	
Barneys New York	Department store	2019	
David Beckham	Personal brand	2022	
Brooks Brothers (Note: Co-owned by Simon Property Group)	Clothing brand	2020	
Care Bears	Entertainment brand	2026	
Champion	Clothing brand	2024	
DC Shoes	Footwear brand	2023	
Dockers	Clothing brand	2025	
Drexel	Home	2018	
Eddie Bauer	Clothing brand	2021	
Element Skateboards	Skateboard brand	2023	
Enzo Angiolini	Luxury fashion label	2018	
Julius Erving	Personal brand	2016	
First Semester	Luxury fashion label	2018	
Forever 21	Clothing brand	2020	
Frederick's of Hollywood	Clothing brand	2015	
Frye	Luxury fashion label	2017	
Geoffrey Beene	Fashion label	2021	
Greg Norman Shark	Clothing brand	2017	
Guess	Clothing brand	2026	
Hart Schaffner Marx	Clothing brand	2012	
Henredon	Home	2018	
Hervé Léger	Luxury fashion label	2017	
Hickey Freeman	Clothing brand	2012	
Hind	Clothing brand	2014	
Honolua	Clothing brand	2023	
Izod	Clothing brand	2021	
Iconic Images	Fine Art Photography Gallery	2021	
Jones New York	Luxury fashion label	2015	
Juicy Couture	Clothing brand	2013	
Judith Leiber	Personal brand	2013	
Kevin Hart	Personal brand	2026	
Lucky Brand Jeans	Clothing brand	2020	
Misook	Luxury fashion label	2012	
Monarchy	Luxury fashion label	2012	
Marilyn Monroe	Personal brand	2010	
Nautica	Clothing brand	2018	
Neil Lane	Luxury fashion label	2017	
Nine West	Clothing and footwear brand	2018	
Greg Norman	Personal brand	2017	
Shaquille O'Neal	Personal brand	2015	
Palm Beach	Luxury fashion label	2012	
Elvis Presley	Personal brand	2013	
Prince Sports	Sporting goods manufacturer	2012	
Quiksilver	Clothing brand	2023	
Reebok	Clothing brand	2022	
Rockport	Footwear brand	2023	
Roxy	Women's lifestyle brand	2023	
RVCA	Clothing brand	2023	
Sansabelt	Luxury fashion label	2012	
Silver Star	Clothing brand	2010	
Sole Play	Luxury fashion label	2018	
Sole Society	Luxury fashion label	2018	
Sperry	Footwear brand	2024	
Sportcraft	Clothing brand	2012	
Sports Illustrated	Sports magazine	2019	
Spyder	Clothing brand	2013	
Sterling & Hunt	Luxury fashion label	2012	
Tapout	Clothing brand	2010	
Taryn Rose	Luxury fashion label	2013	
Ted Baker	Luxury fashion label	2022	
Thalía	Personal brand	2016	
Thomasville	Home	2018	
Tretorn	Luxury fashion label	2015	
Van Heusen	Clothing brand	2021	
Vince Camuto	Fashion label	2018	
Adrienne Vittadini	Personal brand	2013	
Volcom	Lifestyle brand	2019	
Von Zipper	Sports apparel	2023	
Zooey	Luxury fashion label	2012	

== See also ==
- Catalyst Brands

== Notes ==
NAMI Action Figures
