= Ck Calvin Klein =

Fashion house

ck Calvin Klein is a diffusion line of Calvin Klein. The brand is owned by PVH Corp.

== Activities ==
ck Calvin Klein apparel is distributed for women and men exclusively through licensing partner Onward Kashiyama in Japan, and through free-standing stores operated by licensee Club 21 in Southeast Asia. Licensing partner G.A.V. is to launch women's apparel under the brand in the U.S. in the Spring of 2005.

In 2005, Kashiyama was the ck Calvin Klein ready-to-wear license holder in Japan with retail value of €20 million.

In December 2005, the Warnaco Group announced that, in 2006, they would acquire 100% of the shares of the companies that operate the licenses and related wholesale and retail businesses of Calvin Klein Jeans and accessories in Europe and Asia as well as the ck Calvin Klein bridge line of sportswear and accessories in Europe from Fingen SpA, a Florentine holding company, and Euro Cormar SpA for €240 million.

In 2013, PVH Corp., that had bought Calvin Klein Inc. in 2003, acquired Warnaco, thus reuniting control of the brand.

== ck watches and jewelry ==
=== Watches ===
In 2014 the brand was changed from cK watches to Calvin Klein Watches and all new models introduced at Baselworld 2014 had the "Calvin Klein" logo on the dial instead of the "ck" logo.

Until 2021, Calvin Klein watches were produced under license by The Swatch Group, the world's largest producer of watches. In 2019, Swatch Group announced that the licensing agreement with Calvin Klein would not be renewed. In August 2020, PVH struck a licensing deal with Movado Group to produce watches for the Calvin Klein brand.

=== Jewelry ===
ck jewelry are sold in Japan through Vendome Yamada Corp., one of the leading Japanese manufactures and distributors of fashion jewelry. A complementary collection was introduced worldwide outside Japan in 2004 under a license with The Swatch Group.

== See also ==
- Calvin Klein Collection
