= Izod =

Clothing company

The Izod Corporation
- Type: Subsidiary
- Industry: Textiles – apparel/clothing
- Founded: 1937 (89 years ago)
- Headquarters: New York City, U.S.
- Area served: United States, Canada, Mexico, India, Europe, Russia, Middle East
- Key people: Matthew Maddox (CEO, Authentic Brands Group); Jason Rabin (CEO, Centric Brands); Brent Unger (Lifestyle Division President, Centric Brands)
- Products: Midrange apparel, gifts, and footwear
- Owners: PVH (1995–2021); Authentic Brands Group (2021–present)
- Website: www.izod.com

The Izod Corporation (officially stylized as IZOD; /ˈaɪzɒd/ EYE-zod) is an American midrange clothing company that produces dressy-casual clothing, sportswear for men, and footwear and accessories. It is a division of Authentic Brands Group, and is currently marketed and manufactured by Centric Brands under a long-term licensing agreement for most products. Other Izod classics include the Harrington jacket G-9 model and V-neck and cardigan sweaters. Today, the closest competitor of the Izod brand is the Chaps brand owned by Ralph Lauren Corporation, while the U.S. Polo Assn. brand is also an indirect competitor.

On June 23, 2021, it was announced that the Izod brand would be sold to Authentic Brands Group alongside Van Heusen, Arrow, and Geoffrey Beene. The sale was completed on August 2, 2021. Under ABG, Centric Brands was granted the license to market and manufacture IZOD men's sportswear.

== History ==
In the late 1930s, Vincent dePaul Draddy, an American businessman employed by David Crystal Co., needed a strong name to associate with his quality merchandise for menswear. While vacationing with his family in London, he encountered Arthur James "Jack" Izod's tailoring boutique. Izod (himself a well-respected tailor) produced bespoke shirts and created the Windsor tie-knot for King George V, but was ready to retire, and accepted Draddy's offer to purchase the rights to his distinctive name. The A.J. Izod of London clothing company was introduced to the United States in 1937.

=== Izod Lacoste ===
Izod of London became most notable for its pairing with the Lacoste shirt company from 1952 to 1993. Vincent Draddy began to license the Lacoste shirt to add prestige to the Izod line, but he could not find a market for the then-expensive $8.00 retail price (around equivalent to $97 in 2025). After Draddy began giving the shirts away to his famous friends, Dwight D. Eisenhower, Bing Crosby, Daniel Platt, and John F. Kennedy, the shirts soon became popular with department stores. "Izod of London" became a brand known simply as "Izod Lacoste". While the shirts were equally Izod and Lacoste, they became abbreviated and popularized as "Izod" shirts (which led to the ongoing misunderstanding that the famous "Crocodile" logo of Lacoste is the "Izod" trademark).

=== Growth ===
In 1964, Bernard Lacoste took over the management of the company. Significant company growth was seen under Bernard's management. When he became president, around 300,000 Izod Lacoste products were sold annually. The Izod Lacoste brand reached its height of popularity in the US during the late 1970s and became the signature 1980s "preppy" wardrobe item, mentioned in The Official Preppy Handbook. The company also began to introduce other products into their line, including shorts, perfume, optical and sunglasses, tennis shoes, deck shoes, walking shoes, watches, and various leather goods.

In 1977, Le Tigre Clothing was founded in an attempt to directly compete with Izod Lacoste in the US market, selling a similar array of apparel, but featuring a tiger in place of the signature Lacoste crocodile. Also during this period, Izod's parent, Crystal Brands, came under the management of General Mills, and purchased the Gant U.S.A. brand.

=== Separation ===
During the early 1990s, Izod Lacoste struggled to maintain the market dominance it had enjoyed in previous decades. The initial reaction from Crystal Brands was to separate the two names and target two groups of customers at once; "Izod" was reintroduced as moderately priced apparel in department stores, while Lacoste was renamed "Lacoste Chemise", and repositioned as a luxury lifestyle brand. Eventually, this tactic did not provide the financial gain Crystal had hoped, and the licensing partnership ended in 1993. Sportloisirs S.A. purchased the Lacoste brand entirely in 1993, while Izod was sold to PVH in 1995 after Crystal Brands filed for bankruptcy in early 1994.

PVH repositioned and restored some of Izod's previous relevance, while introducing a number of product lines and brands, complete with an Izod "crest" logo, or patch. In addition to its sportswear, Izod designs a full range of men's suits, shirts, neckties, shoes, outerwear, and fragrances, and continues to produce its famous polo shirts. Within the PVH corporation, the Izod-branded shirt became part of the biggest shirt company in the United States.

=== The PVH era ===
From 2003 to 2007, PVH formed a licensing deal with Kellwood Company to produce Izod-branded women's clothing. Production of the women's line was brought in-house in 2007 until its discontinuation in 2015.

On January 7, 2015, parent company Phillips-Van Heusen announced that it would be closing all 120 Izod retail outlets due to an increasingly competitive environment driven by more premium brands in the outlet retail channel. This move would not affect Izod's growing wholesale business to department stores and other retailers. Coinciding with the closure of the retail outlets, in 2015, the women's line was discontinued.

In spring 2016, Izod introduced the Advantage Polo, a new take on their traditional piqué polo featuring a cotton/polyester blend with natural stretch, moisture-wicking fabric, and UPF-15 sun protection. The Advantage Polo remains available today with various colors and patterns being offered depending on seasonal collection, with the core year-round colors as of 2022 being Black, Bright White, Real Red (bright red), Blue Revival (azure), and Peacoat (navy), with Fairy Tale (pale pink), Blue Radiance (turquoise), Bright Cobalt (cobalt blue), Dahlia Purple (bright purple), Lemon (lemon yellow), Cantaloupe (orange), Fig (wine red), Simply Green (bright green), and Wild Fern (dark green) available as additional year-round Amazon-exclusive colors. The Advantage brand was later expanded to include other products with stretch and/or moisture-wicking fabric such as fleece sweatshirts and button-down shirts. As of 2021, the original 100% cotton Heritage piqué polo has been discontinued.

On June 7, 2017, parent company PVH announced that it has reached a licensing agreement with Adjmi Apparel Group subsidiary Sports Products of America to manufacture women's sportswear, golfwear, and activewear under the Izod brand beginning February 2018, thus signifying Izod's return to the women's clothing market. Nongolf women's Izod products were put on hiatus in 2020, but were brought back in spring 2021. As of 2022 all women's IZOD products have been discontinued except for women's footwear, however, the women's line once again made a return for the Spring/Summer 2025 collection.

On August 28, 2018, PVH announced it would expand the Izod brand to Europe starting with the fall/winter 2018 collection, initially in Spain, Germany, the Netherlands, and Scandinavia. PVH initially stated that the launch of the Izod brand should fill in the void between European fast fashion labels and "premium" American mass-produced brands. This was followed by more of Europe, Russia, and the Middle East in spring 2019.

In April 2019, licensee Arvind announced it was looking to sell its licensing rights to the Izod brand for the Indian market.

In early 2020, PVH announced its sustainability policy for its Izod and Van Heusen brands to eliminate single-use plastic from packaging by 2024 and use 100% sustainable cotton, polyester, and nylon by 2025.

On July 14, 2020, PVH announced that it would close its remaining Heritage Brands retail outlets operating mainly under the Van Heusen name, most of which also carried Izod products. The Izod and Van Heusen brands are not being discontinued; the wholesale business, which sells their product to department stores, warehouse clubs, and online retailers, is not affected. The direct online sales platform for the Izod and Van Heusen brands also remained active.

=== Sale to Authentic Brands Group ===
In May 2021, PVH was reported as exploring a sale of the Heritage Brands division, with Authentic Brands Group as a potential buyer. The sale was officially announced on June 23, 2021, consisting of Izod, Van Heusen, Arrow, and Geoffrey Beene. The sale was completed on August 2, 2021. Under ABG, Centric Brands was named as the licensee to manufacture and market IZOD sportswear, thus separating the marketing and manufacturing of the brand from longtime stablemate Van Heusen, which United Legwear & Apparel Co. was named as its licensee.

Since its acquisition by Authentic Brands Group (ABG), the IZOD brand has undergone a strategic repositioning toward a more upmarket segment, with increased emphasis on product quality and sustainability. The brand has also shifted its distribution focus toward core retail partners and its own e‑commerce platform, reducing its presence in off‑price and discount channels. This approach contrasts with that of its longtime competitor, Chaps, which has moved further into the value segment and expanded its distribution through retailers such as Walmart, while scaling back its traditional department‑store offerings.

== Brands ==
Since Izod's first brand, Izod, was launched in 1938, it has grown considerably to include a variety of essential, performance, and luxury brands.

=== Current ===
- Izod (formerly Izod Classix): Izod's original brand for men, this line includes tailored clothing, polo shirts, shoes, fragrances, leather goods, underwear, neckwear, eyewear, and watches.
- Izod Jeans: Denim basics and weekend sportswear from the Izod line (currently licensed to and produced by O5 Apparel).
- Izod Saltwater Collection: A collection of men's clothing with relaxed fits, this line typically includes oxford and chambray button-down shirts, chino shorts, lightweight polo shirts, and relaxed-fit T-shirts (many with nautical and/or tropical themes).
- Izod Advantage: The performance line of Izod, it was introduced in spring 2016. This line typically features SportFlex stretch fabric and CoolFX moisture-wicking technology.
- Izod Premium Essentials: Introduced in Spring 2017 as Heritage Essentials, it was renamed to Premium Essentials with the spring 2018 collection; it was a collection of dressy-casual clothing for men such as button-down poplin sport shirts, spring/summer interlock knit polo shirts, and wool-blend sweater vests. Previously discontinued Spring 2021 but brought back in spring 2023.
- Izod Breeze Collection: Originally introduced in spring 2017 as part of the main Izod collection as The Breeze Shirt, spinoff products were introduced in spring 2018 and it eventually became its own distinct collection in spring 2019. This product line is primarily focused on warm-weather cooling with CoolFX technology, and is distinguished from the Advantage line by primarily focusing on cooling comfort rather than athletic performance. Discontinued in spring 2020, it was consolidated with the Advantage line but was revived in spring 2023 once again as a separate line after Izod's acquisition by Authentic Brands Group/Centric Brands.
- Izod Performance Comfort: A line of casual button-down shirts with stretch fabrics introduced in spring 2024.
- Izod Luxury Sport (LX): Izod's 'red label' premium sportswear brand for men, it has premium fabrics and finer attention to detail, such as name embroidery. As with the 'blue label', Luxury Sports spans from tailored clothing, sportswear, activewear, and accessories, to leather goods. Once available exclusively at Macy's stores, it was discontinued in 2014 but was brought back initially as a fall/winter-only line in 2023 (with expansion to spring/summer in 2026) and is available at most retailers that carry the brand. The 2023 Luxury Sport line does not feature a red label.
- Izod PerformX: Referring to distinct lines, the first PerformX line referred to a high-tech sports collection aimed at winter sportsgear, golfers, swimming, and IndyCar, often featuring lightweight microfibers and super pima cottons; this line was discontinued in 2016 and superseded by the Advantage line. The second PerformX line was a line of dress shirts featuring no-iron stretch fabric; it was discontinued in 2018. The PerformX name is currently used for a line of prescription eyewear.
- Izod Golf: The official golf line of Izod, it includes shirts, shorts, and pants, available for men, and until 2022, for women.
- Izod Holiday: The holiday collection of Izod, it features Fair Isle sweaters and holiday-colored, tartan, long-sleeve, button-down shirts.
- IzodEd: A licensed line of schoolwear for children and young adults

=== Former ===
- Izod Club: A line of dressy casual clothes from the 1990s, now discontinued
- Izod XFG: A line of high-performance golf apparel and activewear, now discontinued
- Izod Golf Z-Series: Launched spring 2020 as a golf line targeted towards Generation Z, it is distinguished from the standard Izod Golf line by featuring slim fits and cotton/polyester blends. In fall 2020, this line was available in regular fits using the same cotton/polyester blends. It was discontinued in spring 2021 due to poor sales.

== Licensees ==
These are the following licensees who manufacture and market IZOD products:

- Centric Brands - Men's, women's, and kids' clothing, except denim, footwear, tailored clothing, and select outerwear.
- O5 Apparel - Men's denim.
- Groupe Lemur - Kids' outerwear, ski, and swimwear.
- S. Rothschild - Select men's outerwear.
- Eastman Footwear - Men's footwear.
- Peerless Clothing - Men's tailored clothing.
- ClearVision Optical - Eyewear.
- Avanti Linens - Bed and bath products.
- K9 Wear - Pet products.
- Unified Accessories - Belts and leather goods.

== Availability ==
The main retailers for the Izod brand are department-store chains Kohl's, J.C. Penney, and Belk and online retailer Amazon.com, with secondary retailers being Bealls and Boscov's. From spring/summer 2020 to fall/winter 2021, IZOD products were also available online at Walmart.com. Other retailers where Izod products can be found may occasionally include some smaller regional department-store chains, off-price clothing stores (such as Ross Stores, TJ Maxx, Marshalls, Nordstrom Rack, or Burlington), warehouse clubs (such as Costco or Sam's Club), and regional or local clothing boutiques, although since 2021 the brand has significantly reduced its presence outside its core retailers. Until 2018, the brand was available at Macy's full-line stores, but the brand can still occasionally be found at some Macy's Backstage locations. In June 2024, the official IZOD website reopened to online orders after a three-year hiatus during the transition from PVH to Authentic Brands Group and Centric Brands.

== Sports sponsorships ==
The former Continental Airlines Arena, in New Jersey, United States was renamed the Izod Center as of October 31, 2007, the National Basketball Association's New Jersey Nets' season opener. The company paid $1.4 million per annum for the naming rights during the first two years of the agreement, while the Nets remained tenants, which dropped to $750,000 per year for the balance of the five-year deal.

In 2009, Izod became the official apparel provider of the IndyCar Series and Firestone Indy Lights Series. Izod produces T-shirts, polos, pullovers, hats, and umbrellas for league and team officials and the general public.

In 2010, Izod became the official title sponsor of the Izod IndyCar Series, a deal worth $10 million a year for 5 years. Izod discontinued its sponsorship in 2014.

== Advertising campaigns ==
In spring 2017 and again in spring 2018, Izod has partnered with American tennis' Bryan brothers to promote the spring/summer collections.

In fall 2018 and 2019, Izod partnered with Green Bay Packers quarterback Aaron Rodgers and Saturday Night Live comedian Colin Jost to promote the fall/winter collections. This partnership was put on pause in 2020 due to the COVID-19 pandemic, but returned in fall 2021 (without Colin Jost).
