= Van Heusen =

Van Heusen is a surname. Notable people with the surname include:

- Billy Van Heusen (born 1946), American football player
- Jimmy Van Heusen (1916–1990), American composer
- John Manning Van Heusen, Dutch immigrant in America, after whom PVH Corp. was named

== Fictional characters ==
- Juliet Van Heusen, a character in Wizards of Waverly Place

== See also ==
- Van Heusen (brand), a clothing brand owned by Authentic Brands Group (previously by PVH)
