= James Salter (disambiguation) =

James Salter was an American writer.

James Salter may also refer to:

- James Arthur Salter, 1st Baron Salter (1881–1975), British politician and academic
- James Salter (swimmer) (born 1976), British swimmer

== See also ==
- Jamie Salter (disambiguation)
