= Emanuel Chirico =

Businessman in the retail clothing industry

Emanuel "Manny" Chirico is a business leader in the retail and apparel industry. Having been with the PVH Corp for 20 years, Chirico was chief executive officer (CEO) for the company from 2006, and chairman from 2007. He resigned as CEO in February 2021. He retired in December 2021.

== Current executive roles ==
Chirico was chairman (since 2007) and director (since 2005) at PVH Corp. He was Chief Executive Officer from 2006 until January 2021. In 2013 he also became principal executive officer and president at Warnaco Group Inc. and in 2003, a director at Dick's Sporting Goods Inc. He is also a director at the American Apparel and Footwear Association. His total compensation for 2013 was $17,884,646.

== Employment history ==
Prior to his current role at the firm, Chirico held a variety of other key executive roles at PVH. These include: chief financial officer, president, chief operating officer, executive vice president, partner-in-charge of the Retail Apparel Group, vice president and controller. He has been with the firm since 1993.

Before joining PVH Corp., Chirico was a partner at Ernst & Young LLC., a company where he worked for 14 years. It was through his work there that he first became interested in the apparel industry, in New York City. He learned some of the business from retired partner Ken Reiss. Chirico explained: “Ken impressed upon me the value of moving beyond the technical aspects of the work to really understand the client’s business and to connect with the client. And Ken was the one who pushed me to realize my potential.”

== Education ==
Chirico is an alumnus of Fordham University, New York, graduating with a CBA.

Chirico is also a graduate of Cardinal Spellman High School, Bronx, NY.

== Awards ==
On November 6, 2013, Chirico was named Person of the Year by MRKETPLACE Magazine. He has been described as “everyone’s hero, an unusual combination of instinct, inspiration and financial savvy. (And he even loves clothes!).” His total compensation for 2012 was listed as Forbes No. 209, CEO Compensation. In 2012, he also earned first place in the Institutional Investor Magazine’s ‘Best CEO in the Apparel, Footwear and Textiles Industry.’

== Personal data ==
Emanuel Chirico is married to Joanne. Born in the Bronx, New York, Chirico now lives in Eastchester, New York. Emanuel and Joanne have three sons together; Dominic, who is a Calvin Klein (a division of PVH) financial analyst and EY alum; Michael, who is a successful entrepreneur and amateur UFC fighter; and Vincent, a Fordham University student.
