= Charming Charlie =

American women's fashion store

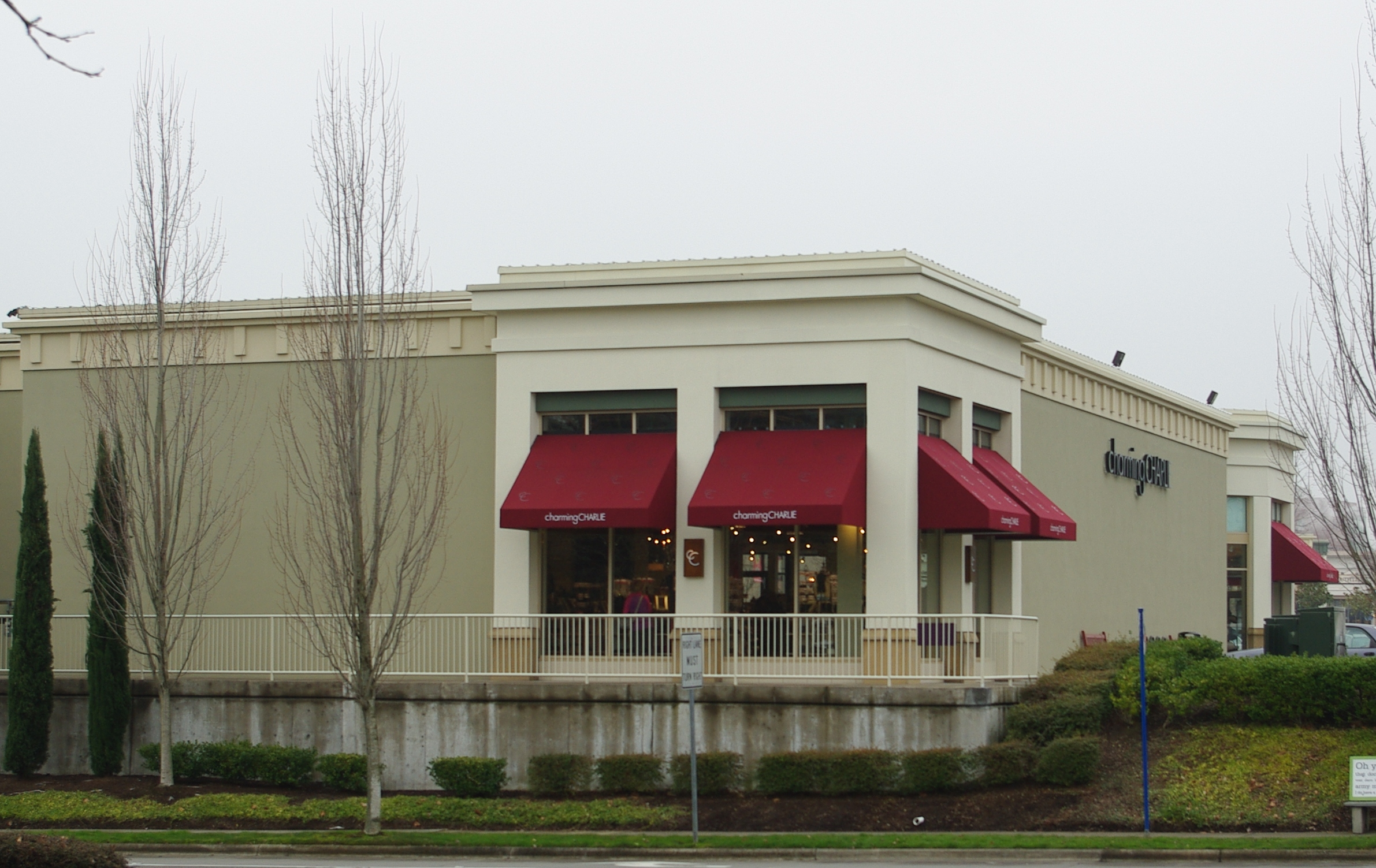
- A Charming Charlie store in Hillsboro, Oregon
- Industry: Women's apparel and accessories
- Founded: 2004
- Headquarters: Houston
- Key people: Charlie Chanaratsopon (CEO and Founder)
- Website: https://charmingcharlie.com/

Charming Charlie is an e-commerce, and formerly brick and mortar women's contemporary fashion and accessories retailer that is based in Houston, Texas. The brand specializes in affordable costume jewelry, clothing, and accessories.

== History ==
Launched in 2004 by founder and former chief executive officer, Charlie Chanaratsopon, the brand is known for offering a wide array of women's apparel and fashion accessories, beauty, gifts and more, all arranged by color.

In November 2017, Charming Charlie filed for Chapter 11 bankruptcy protection after reaching a restructuring deal with its lenders that would allow for the company to continue operating its stores throughout the Christmas season. The company announced plans to shutter 100 of its 375 locations by December 29, 2017, as well as the lay off of additional employees at its corporate headquarters. By April 2018, Charming Charlie had its reorganization plan approved by a U.S. bankruptcy judge, and emerged from its bankruptcy proceedings that same month.

In July 2019, Charming Charlie filed for Chapter 11 bankruptcy for the second time in less than two years. The company noted that its reorganization plan was unsuccessful, stating that "these efforts simply were not sufficient to stabilize." As a result of the bankruptcy filing, the company announced the closure of its 261 remaining locations nationwide, with liquidation sales beginning at all locations immediately after the announcement. All stores permanently closed by August 31, 2019.

By November 2019, the firm had reemerged from bankruptcy, positioned by founder Charlie Chanaratsopon. The company announced a comeback and reopened several new locations, with eventual plans to open 50 to 75 locations within the next few years. However, in 2022, Charming Charlie announced that they would once again be shutting down its locations after failing to reach profitability.

== Awards ==
In 2013, Charming Charlie was awarded with The Accessories Council's "Specialty Retailer" ACE Award, ranked number 745 on Inc. Magazine's annual list of "Top 5,000 Fastest-Growing Businesses," and was featured on Forbes Magazine's "Ones to Watch" list. Prior to that, in 2010, Charming Charlie received the "Hot Retailer of the Year" award from the International Council of Shopping Centers (ICSC) and the "Marketer of the Year" award in the Retail Category from the American Marketing Association (AMA). Within the same year, Charlie was honored with Ernst & Young Entrepreneur of the Year Award in the Retail Category.
