= Francisco Costa (designer) =

Brazilian fashion designer (born 1964)

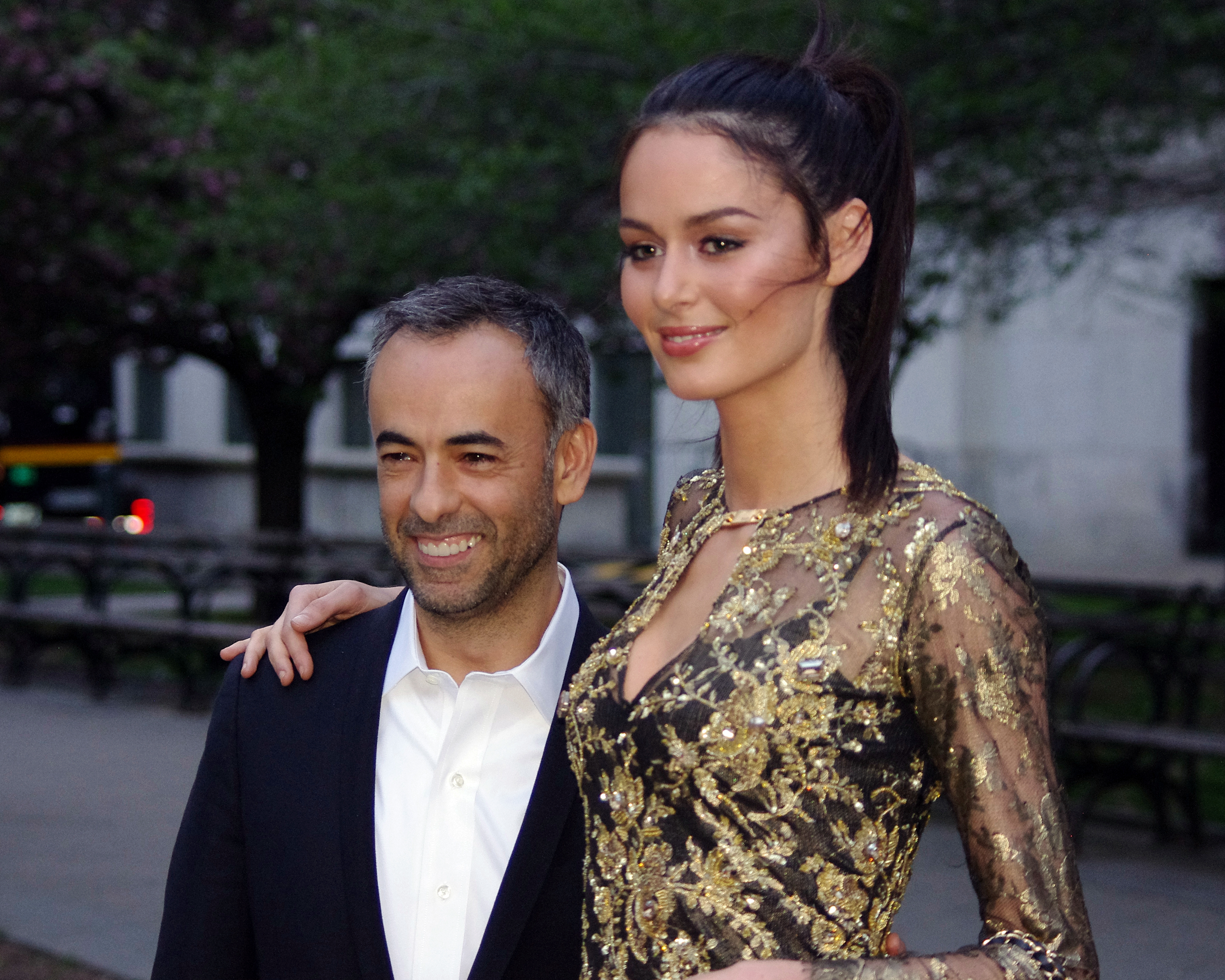
- Francisco Costa and Nicole Trunfio at the Vanity Fair party for the 2012 Tribeca Film Festival
- Born: May 10, 1964 (age 62); Minas Gerais, Brazil
- Education: Fashion Institute of Technology
- Awards: Council of Fashion Designers America Womenswear Designer of the Year, 2006 and 2008; National Design Award for Fashion Design, 2009

Francisco Costa (born 10 May 1964) is a Brazilian designer. He worked as the Women's Creative Director of Calvin Klein Collection and has launched his own beauty line, Costa Brazil.

== Early life and education ==
Costa is the second youngest of five children. He grew up in Guarani, Brazil, where his mother, Maria-Francisca, owned a children's wear factory. She began her business producing dresses commissioned by a traveling salesman. Costa's father, Jacy Neves da Costa, ran a small ranch.

Following his mother's death in 1981, he left with a friend for New York City in 1985. He was twenty-one and spoke no English at the time. He enrolled in a language class at Hunter College and took courses at the Fashion Institute of Technology at night. He obtained employment with Herbert Rounick, whose Seventh Avenue (Manhattan) company made dresses for Oscar de la Renta and Bill Blass. Costa went to work for de la Renta after Rounick's death, designing for the firm's Japanese licenses. Costa credits de la Renta with teaching him the most about both designing clothes and life. He remained with the company for five years.

== Career ==
=== Women's Creative Director, Calvin Klein Collection ===
Klein's partner, Barry Schwartz, introduced Costa to Klein in 2001. Costa joined the Klein design group after working for Gucci, where he was an assistant to Tom Ford. Their first collaboration is known as the Cher Collection. Costa was mentioned as a possible replacement when Ford retired from designing for Gucci and Yves Saint Laurent, in late 2003.

In 2003, Costa became the principal designer for the women's Calvin Klein Collection at the age of 39.

=== Fashion collections (2004–2007) ===
Costa emphasized trouser suits in the spring 2004 collections. Costa also paired clingy, translucent daytime skirts with cashmere tops and layered cardigan over rumpled white shirts and men's ribbed undershirts with loose cotton shorts. This look reflected the late 1970s styles when designers like Calvin Klein and Perry Ellis came to prominence.

In the fall of 2004, Costa introduced washed silk dresses and black wool felt coats. The clothing was given weight by the librarian brogue heel. The style was exceedingly popular during both the Paris, France and Milan, Italy shows.

In his collection for Spring 2005, Costa showed a sea-green silk dress "wrapped like a towel". The silk dress was coveted by many buyers and shipped to stores in the late fall and early winter.

The inspiration for this collection's uncomplicated evening dresses were primitive wood sculptures by Brâncuși. They were based on a trapeze, combining viscose jersey with silk.

Vogue and Harper's Bazaar named Elle Macpherson to their 2005 best dressed lists after she wore Costa's lime green dress.

Costa's February, 2006 collection for Calvin Klein was reviewed by The New York Times fashion critic Cathy Horyn, for conveying "largely a surface beauty". It featured dresses with many layers of black chiffon and tulle. His collection was reminiscent of the 1930s. Horyn wondered if many women would not find the fashions "untenable and fussy, if not stifling."

In May 2006, Costa served as chairman of a benefit for the Whitney Museum of American Art. He approached artists Ghada Amer, Vik Muniz, and Billy Sullivan to make art identified with fashion. After being shown at the Whitney Art Party, the work was moved and displayed in the windows of the Calvin Klein boutique on Madison Avenue (Manhattan).

=== Costa Brazil ===
Costa founded Costa Brazil after departing from Calvin Klein in 2016. He went back to Brazil and lived with the Ywanawas indigenous tribe, where he was inspired to launch his own sustainable beauty brand, Costa Brazil.

In 2026, the brand's first brick-and-mortar store was opened at The Shops & Restaurants at Hudson Yards.

== Personal life ==
Costa's partner is horse trainer John DeStefano Jr. The two have been together since May 2004. Costa donned a coat and tie to join DeStefano for opening day at Belmont Park, where the latter had horses running in the eighth and ninth races. Costa and DeStefano met in 1990 at George Smith, the furniture store where Costa worked on Saturdays to supplement the salary he earned on Seventh Avenue.
