= Veronica Leoni =

Italian fashion designer

Veronica Leoni is an Italian fashion designer. She is the creative director of the Calvin Klein Collection, working in the role since May 2024.
