= Hilco Capital =

British financial investment and restructuring advisory company

Hilco Capital Limited
- Formerly: Petherrace Limited (2000–2001); Hilco UK Limited (2001–2013)
- Type: Subsidiary
- Industry: Investment, finance, restructuring
- Founded: March 10, 2000; 26 years ago in London, England
- Headquarters: London, England
- Area served: Western Europe, Canada, Australia
- Services: Turnaround investing, lending, restructuring services
- Owner: ORIX Corporation (majority)
- Parent: Hilco London Limited
- Website: hilcocapital.com

Hilco Capital Limited is a British financial investment and restructuring advisory company, operating in Western Europe, Canada and Australia.

== History ==
Hilco Capital was founded in London in 2000 as a joint venture between its management team and Hilco Global.

In January 2005, Hilco Capital bought £90 million bank debt of Allders.

In April 2013, Hilco Capital rescued entertainment retailer HMV/Fopp from administration, saving 141 branches. In February 2019, the retailer was sold to Sunrise Records, but with Hilco Capital retaining and licensing the trademarks for HMV/Fopp and His Master's Voice as Mermaid (Brands) Limited.

In May 2018, Hilco Capital rescued the home improvement chain Homebase for a nominal £1 from Wesfarmers, following a botched attempt to convert the stores to their Bunnings Warehouse format. In August 2018, Hilco Capital announced a company voluntary arrangement (CVA) for Homebase, closing 42 of its 249 stores in an attempt to return it to profitability. In February 2020, the retailer returned to profitability earlier than expected, and was listed for sale in November 2020. In November 2024, Hilco Capital placed Homebase into administration following sustained losses with The Range, B&Q and Wickes purchasing certain assets.

The firm have also rescued Denby Pottery Company, as well as Habitat, before selling to sold to Home Retail Group & Cafom). Other deals include Tilley Endurables (Canada, sold to Gibraltar & Company), Glue Stores (Australia, sold to Accent Group), Anglia Crown (sold to BonCulina) and Cath Kidston Limited (sold to Next).

Hilco Capital also acted as an advisor for Debenhams and Peacocks during their administrations, and also operated British Home Stores during their administration. They have also provided funding for Superdry, French Connection, Gieves & Hawkes and David Jones.

While the company was described in December 2018 by The Times as a vulture fund, other media reports have described this narrative as ‘scapegoat-hunting desperation’.

== Awards ==
Hilco Capital was awarded Special Situations Debt Provider of the Year at the IFT Awards 2022. The company also won the Turnaround of the Year Award at the Turnaround, Restructuring & Insolvency Awards (TRI) 2019. It also won the Business Rescue of the Year award (£21-50m turnover) at the Insolvency & Rescue Awards 2009.
