= Le Tigre (clothing brand) =

American brand of apparel

- Company type: Subsidiary
- Industry: Retail
- Founded: 1977
- Headquarters: New York City, New York
- Products: Apparel, Shoes
- Parent: Infinity Lifestyle Brands & Hilco Brands
- Website: letigreglobal.com

Le Tigre is an American brand of apparel designed to rival Lacoste in styling. First offered in 1977, Le Tigre polos sported a leaping tiger in lieu of Lacoste's signature crocodile. The brand made a comeback in 2003, after being out of production through the 1990s. Le Tigre had become popular during the later 1980s; celebrities from Wilt Chamberlain, LL Cool J, and even Ronald Reagan were seen wearing the tiger. The company is based in New York City. Le Tigre has been a subsidiary of Kenneth Cole Productions since 2007. The brand was then purchased by Infinity Lifestyle Brands and Hilco Brands in November 2015. Rapper Ma$e also famously sported a Le Tigre polo shirt on his Welcome Back album cover.

== Notes ==
- DeCarlo, Lauren (May 25, 2006). "Le Tigre Comes Into Focus". Women's Wear Daily.
- Sarkisian-Miller, Nola (August 17, 2006). "Contemporary Art". Women's Wear Daily.
