= Hilco Global =

American financial services company

- Type: Subsidiary
- Founded: 1987
- Founder: Jeff Hecktman
- Headquarters: Northbrook, Illinois, U.S.
- Key people: Jeff Hecktman, Chairman & CEO
- Services: Asset valuation; Business advisory; Asset monetization; Asset disposition (liquidation); Commercial Lending; Consulting – Professional Services
- Parent: ORIX Corporation USA
- Divisions: Hilco Global Capital Solutions; Hilco Global Professional Services
- Website: hilcoglobal.com

Hilco Global is an American financial services holding company headquartered in Northbrook, Illinois. The company has offices throughout the world and provides services to companies, their lenders and professional services advisers across a broad spectrum of business categories including retail, commercial, industrial and financial. It is considered one of the largest distressed investment and advisory companies in the world.

In 2025, a majority stake in Hilco Global was acquired by ORIX Corporation USA, a subsidiary of Japanese firm ORIX, and the company was restructured into two divisions. The firm now provides advisory and valuation services on maximizing the value of under-performing and excess retail, consumer products and industrial inventory, real estate, intellectual property, including consumer brands, patents, and accounts receivable. The second division named Hilco Global Capital Solutions is focused on asset-based lending to assist companies with asset monetization.

== History ==
The company was founded in 1987 by Jeff Hecktman as the Hilco Trading Company, after restructuring his family's industrial supply business and selling off many of the under-performing assets. The company was renamed Hilco Global in 2013, eliminating the use of the name Hilco Trading Company, as well as introducing a new logo and website for the company.

In 2006, it was announced that Goldman Sachs Group and Cerberus Capital Management were in talks to purchase a significant stake in the company. Hecktman sold part of the company to both investment firms to help finance other ventures, including private equity style buyouts of faded consumer brands.

From 2019 until 2023, a 27% stake in Hilco Global was owned by the Caisse de dépôt et placement du Québec (CDPQ), a Canadian company which manages public pension and insurance funds. In May 2019, Hilco subsidiary H19 Capital acquired the assets of 19th Capital Group, an Indianapolis transportation and truck leasing company.

=== Hilco Merchant Resources / Hilco Consumer - Retail ===
In 2000, Hilco Global founded a business division named Hilco Merchant Resources LLC, a subsidiary of the company that specializes in retail inventory valuation, retail store closings, retail inventory disposition, fixture, furniture, and equipment disposition, and asset protection. Michael Keefe and Cory Lipoff, formerly of Gordon Brothers, joined HMR the same year with Keefe becoming the CEO. In 2001, the division became known as one of the top five liquidation firms in the United States, having been involved in the $1.8 billion liquidation of Montgomery Ward following that company's bankruptcy. Some of its most notable disposition and liquidation deals included work for Sears, Sears Canada, CompUSA, Sportmart, PharMor Rx, Coldwater Creek, Charming Charlie, and Target Canada. In 2016, the division helped save Aéropostale from final liquidation, eventually allowing the retailer to restructure and reopen over 500 stores. As Toys "R" Us stores closed in 2018, Hilco Merchant Resources oversaw the nearly $2 billion liquidation of their inventory and assets. Hilco Merchant Resources also expanded its operations by opening an office in Australia, taking on retail inventory liquidations of stores that include Fletcher Jones, Dubbo Everyday Living and Dick Smith.

ReStore for Retail, a Hilco Global company, introduced a mobile visual merchandising and operations software to aid the working of the frontline store associates and managers and update the in-store shopping experience.

=== ReStore Capital ===
In 2019, Hilco Global launched ReStore Capital which resolves shipping and stocking problems between vendors and retailers. ReStore Capital buys shipments from vendors and then consigns the goods to retailers.

=== Hilco Real Estate ===
Hilco Global founded its real estate business division in 2000 with the formation of Hilco Real Estate, LLC, to be a national provider of accelerated real estate disposition and advisory services. It has acted as agent or principal for numerous real estate acquisitions and sales. It was co-founded by Mitchell Kahn who served as the company's CEO until 2008. Kahn was replaced by Neil Aaronson as CEO and Gregory Apter was promoted to President of the company. Hilco Real Estate was responsible for numerous large transactions in real estate including 1,200 leases for MCI Worldcom that the company either sold or renegotiated. It also closed hundreds of Blockbuster stores following the company's 2010 bankruptcy as well as approximately 200 Borders following that company's 2011 bankruptcy. Hilco Real Estate was also involved with the selling of over 165 unused properties owned by Hostess after that company filed for bankruptcy in 2013.

Hilco Global expanded its real estate business in 2012 with the formation of Hilco Real Estate Finance LLC, a lending division of Hilco Real Estate. Hilco Real Estate Finance operated as a private real estate mortgage lending company and in a year and a half had originated loans in approximately 20 states. Hilco Real Estate Finance was sold to the private equity firm Garrison Investment Group in 2014.

In August 2023, WeWork hired Hilco Global and Hilco Real Estate as an adviser for restructuring advice to avoid a Chapter 11 bankruptcy filing and restructuring the company's debts out of court.

=== Hilco Capital ===
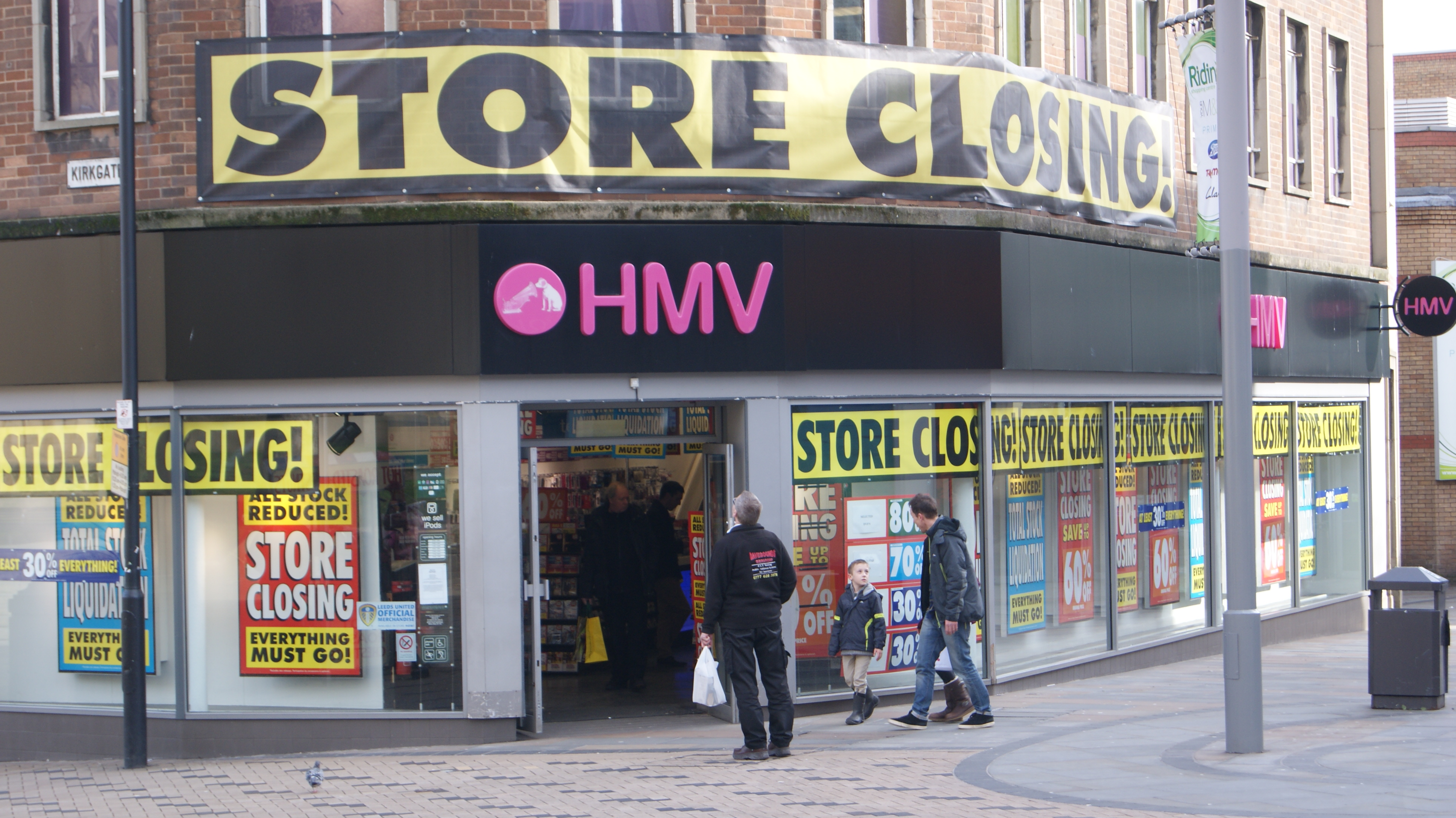
An HMV store in Wakefield closed as part of the group administration, prior to the purchase by Hilco Capital

In 2000, Hilco Global launched Hilco Capital in the United Kingdom to support retail restructuring and distressed investments.

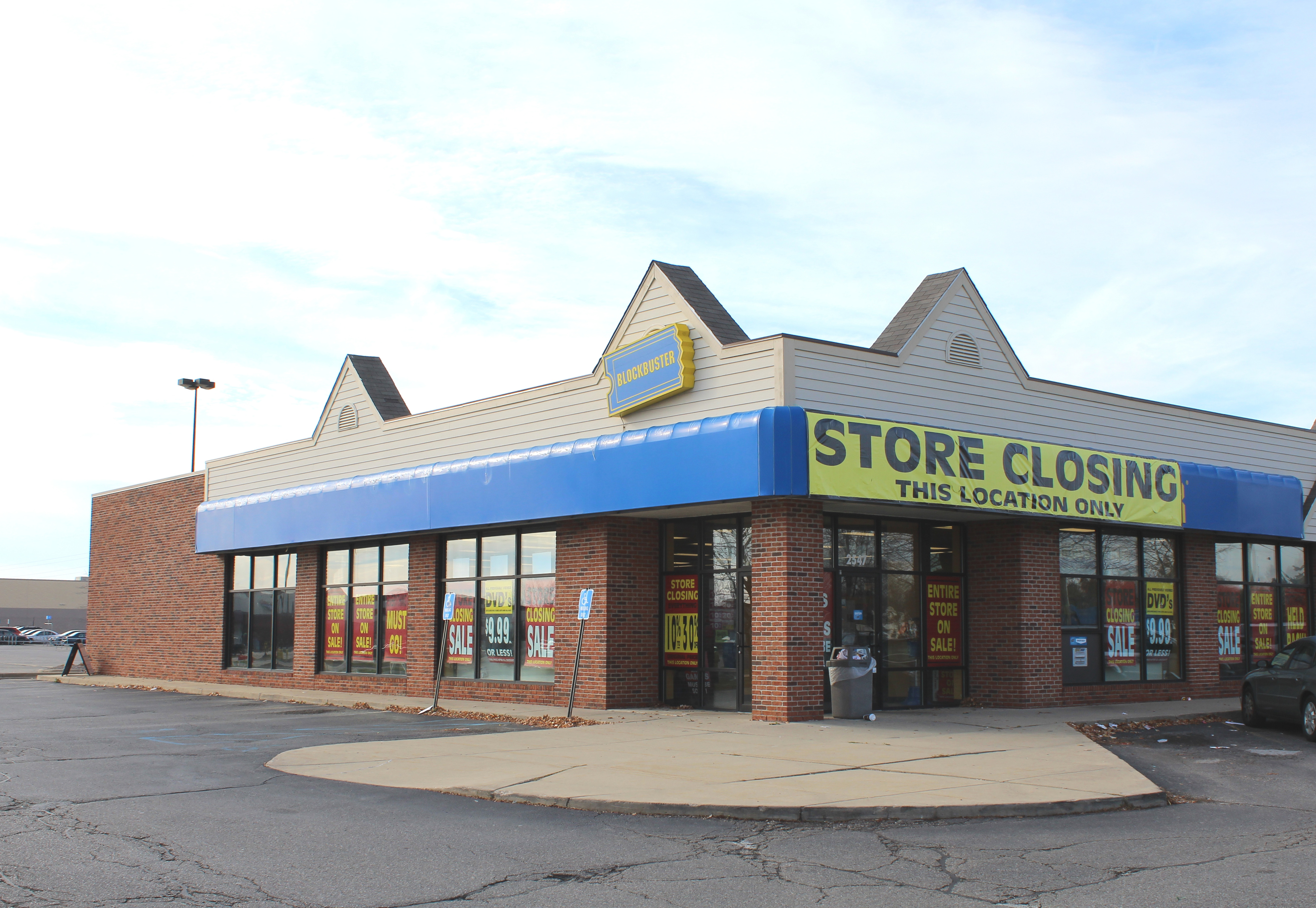
Blockbuster Store Closing, Ypsilanti Township, Michigan

=== Hilco Valuation Services ===
In 2001 Hilco Global formed a business unit called Hilco Appraisal Services LLC, bundling all of the industrial, retail and real estate appraisal services of the holding company into a single unit. Later renamed Hilco Valuation Services, the company is based in the U.S. and has global offices in the U.K., Canada, Australia, Mexico, South American and Asia. One of this units most notable deals was completed in 2005 with the valuation of 29 locations of over 40 million square feet owned by Delphi Automotive.

=== Hilco Receivables ===
2001 was also the year Hilco Global expanded its holdings with the formation of Hilco Receivables LLC, a division that purchases bad debt and services accounts receivable. By 2004, Hilco Receivables had acquired more than $2 billion in receivables and in 2006 it opened a 200-person collection center that operated under the name Apex Financial, LLC. The company also provides receivable appraisals to lenders as well as financing to companies who acquire receivables portfolios. One of the most notable transactions involving Hilco Receivables was the purchase of $25 million in account receivables from National Envelope Corporation after its bankruptcy in 2013.

=== Hilco Retail Consulting ===
In 2004, Hilco Global acquired a retail strategic consulting practice from Arthur Andersen called Senn Delaney – SD Consulting. In 2013, the consulting practice was rebranded as Hilco Retail Consulting or HRC Advisory, and in 2021, it was sold to Accenture with the team in North America joining Accenture's Retail Strategy group.

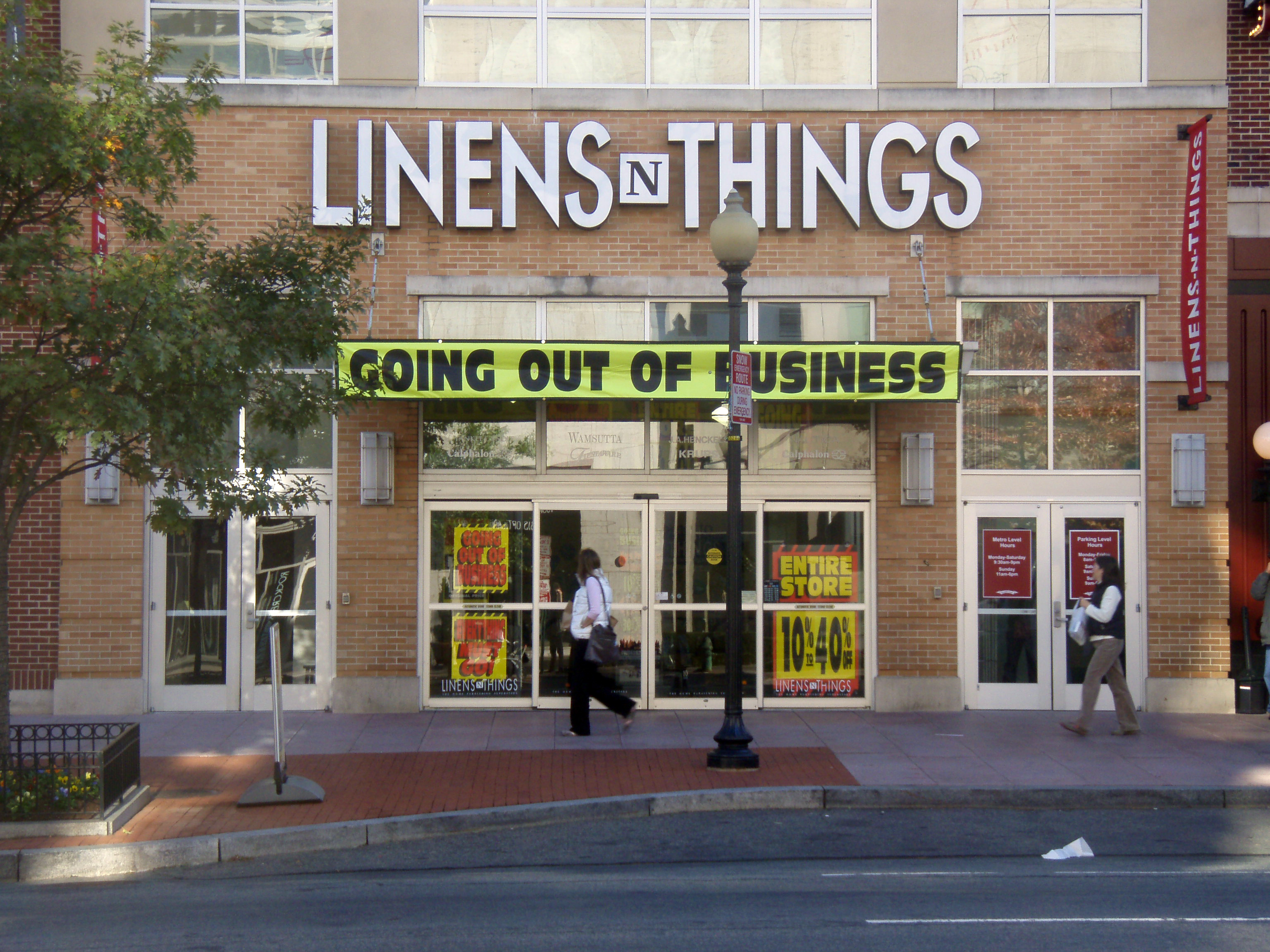
A Linens 'n Things store notifying customers "Going out of Business"

=== Hilco Consumer Capital ===
Hilco Brands was formed from the initial investment as an extension of Hilco Consumer Capital, another company held by Hilco Global. One of the first brands purchased was Halston, a notable fashion line that became popular in the 1970s. Additional brands purchased by Hilco include the Ram and Tommy Armour golf club lines, both companies that were previously based in Chicago, as well as Le Tigre, Haute Hippie, Portico, Under the Canopy, Linens 'n Things, and Polaroid. Hilco then sold the Polaroid brand and its related intellectual property in 2017 to the Smolokowski family, a Polish group of investors. In 2017, Hilco Brands invested in the startup company StreetTrend LLC, a luxury sneaker producer.

=== Hilco Streambank ===
Hilco Streambank is an additional subsidiary added to the Hilco Global family in 2011. The company was formed to provide services for intellectual property brands such as Borders, Posh, Tots, Linens N’ Things and Circuit City. Hilco Streambank is also known for its IPv4 auction marketplace used for the purchase and sale of IPv4 assets. In 2019, Hilco Streambank helped Johnson Publishing organize an auction for their Ebony and Jet magazine photograph archive after Johnson went bankrupt. Hilco Streambank also managed the intellectual property sale for Charming Charlie in 2019 after they went bankrupt including their trademarks, domain names, customer data, and social media assets. In 2020, Hilco Streambank managed the marketing and selling of all Earth Fare stores, leases, and intellectual property after they filed for bankruptcy.

In 2023, IPv4.Global, a Hilco Global company and an IPv4 marketplace, brokered US$1 billion in IPv4 address sales.

=== Hilco Industrial ===
Hilco Global's Industrial unit, Hilco Industrial LLC, made national news in 2014 with its involvement in the disposition of excess municipal transportation assets for the City of Detroit following the city's bankruptcy, the largest municipal bankruptcy filing in the history of the United States. Prior to its involvement with the City of Detroit, Hilco Industrial played a role in the sale of Chrysler and GM plants in 2010. In Australia, Hilco Industrial liquidated the last remaining automotive manufacturing plant on the continent, Toyota Altona.

=== Hilco Redevelopment Partners ===
In 2012, Hilco Redevelopment Partners (HRP) bought the Sparrows Point Steel Mill in Maryland to demolish and rebuild as a warehouse distribution hub, renamed Tradepoint Atlantic. The deal has operated in partnership with Baltimore-based investment firm Redwood Capital Partners. In 2017, HRP bought the Crawford Generating Station in Little Village, Chicago, to transform the space into an updated distribution center called Exchange 55. After the Philadelphia Energy Solutions refinery burned down and went bankrupt in 2019, HRP bought the plant for $225.5 million. Hilco will carry out the dismantling of the plant and an extensive remediation effort before beginning projects on the site.

In October 2020, Hilco was hired by Shop Vac Corp. for liquidation services.

In 2023, HRP began the construction of the first phase of The Bellwether District's South Philadelphia site to convert the industrial site into an e-commerce and logistics campus.

In August 2023, WeWork Inc. partnered with Hilco for real estate restructuring with hundreds of landlords.

In 2024, Hilco worked with Pitney Bowes Global to acquire its struggling e-commerce business. The company oversaw a Chapter 11 bankruptcy and liquidation of their e-commerce segment and assets.

In September 2025, Hilco Global finalized the spinoff of Hilco Redevelopment Partners property unit with plans to launch a US$250 million investment fund.

=== Acquisition by Orix and restructuring ===
In July 2025, Hilco Global announced that ORIX Corporation USA would be buying a 70% equity stake, at a valuation near US$1 billion. Hilco Global became a subsidiary of Orix USA with a new structure focused on professional services and asset management, including new funding commitments. The deal was set to position Hilco's background in asset valuation with global capital management infrastructure by Orix.
