= Italo Zucchelli =

Italian fashion designer (born 1965)

- Born: 4 June 1965 (age 60); La Spezia
- Occupation: Fashion designer

Italo Zucchelli (born June 4, 1965, in La Spezia, Italy) is an Italian fashion designer, the Men's creative director of Calvin Klein Collection from 2004 to 2016. Designated by Calvin Klein to take over the men's wear in 2004, Italo Zucchelli is credited for amplifying the brand's minimalism and "Americanism".

== Biography ==
Italo Zucchelli studied architecture in Florence for two years, and then studied design and style at Polimoda, graduating in 1988.

After working in menswear for Jil Sander and Romeo Gigli, he received a call from Calvin Klein inviting him to work on the brand's women's collection. He worked with the team for 3 years. When Calvin Klein left the company in 2004, Zucchelli was promoted to Men's Creative Director of Calvin Klein.

As of February 2015, Zucchelli had organized 30 CK collection shows. In April 2016, as the company decided to assign men's and women's collections to the same designer, Italo Zucchelli left Calvin Klein.

== Design style ==
Italo Zucchelli's first exposure to the CK brand was in 1982 with the ad of the brand displaying a young man wearing just underwear, a first at the time. Inspired by the "clean American" look of the brand's models and wears, Zucchelli continues the Calvin Klein tradition of formalwear with a slight athletic touch to it. He gives an equal attention to the design of its clothes and to the choice of models that wear them, as he says they embody the spirit of the brand. According to him, the "Calvin Klein guy" is strong, masculine, healthy, built, good-looking: "very American".

Italo Zucchelli has been often noted for using unique materials in his designs. He used foam from bicycle seats which he displayed at his 2009 show in New York. He also created a tuxedo jacket made of the synthetic rubber Neoprene. This plastic approach to the fabric has been tagged by Canadian fashion critic Tim Blanks as "sublime futurism". Some of his work is colorful, like the red fluorescent suit exhibited at the 2009 NY Show, or the bright-colored leggings inspired by Australian surfers and revealed in 2007.

Zucchelli's 2015 fall collection was inspired by the book Sex and Suits by Anne Hollander.

== Awards ==
- 2009: CFDA award
