= Matthew Maddox =

American business executive and entrepreneur

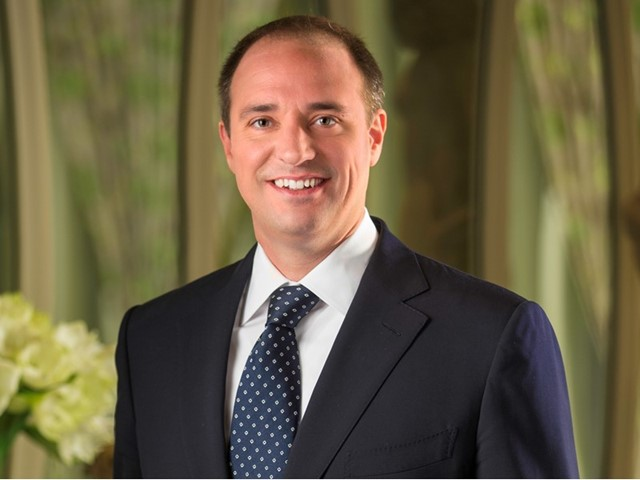
- Citizenship: United States
- Education: Southern Methodist University
- Occupations: CEO of Wynn Resorts (2018-2022); President of Authentic Brands Group (2025–2026); President and Chief Executive Officer of Authentic Brands Group (2026–present)
- Website: corporate.authentic.com

Matthew 'Matt' Maddox is an American business executive and entrepreneur. He is the president and chief executive officer of Authentic Brands Group. He is the former CEO of Wynn Resorts, Ltd., the American publicly traded developer and operator of higher-end hotels and casinos. Under Maddox's tenure as CEO, Wynn Resorts received a series of awards. Maddox was also recognized for providing steady leadership at Wynn through the COVID-19 crisis, including a $250 million commitment to maintain full payroll for the company's 30,000 employees during the 75-day closure. In November 2021, he announced his intention to step down as CEO of Wynn Resorts effective January 31, 2022.

He previously served as the company's president and chief financial officer from 2013 until he took office as CEO on February 6, 2018, following the resignation of Steve Wynn. In August 2018, Maddox joined the Wynn Resorts board of directors.

== Early life and education ==
Maddox received a Bachelor's in finance from Southern Methodist University. He attended Mena High School, Arkansas.

== Career ==
Maddox is president and chief executive officer of Authentic Brands Group.

Maddox began his career as an investment banker at Bank of America. His first stint in the gaming industry was at Park Place Entertainment (later Caesars) as director of finance.

Maddox joined Wynn Resorts at its founding in 2002. He served as vice president of investor relations and treasurer while helping secure the financing required to launch Wynn. In 2003, he relocated to Macau to build Wynn Resorts Macau as its chief financial officer. In 2008, he returned to the United States and became chief financial officer of Wynn Resorts. In 2013 he was additionally appointed president of Wynn Resorts, following which he was involved in building the Wynn Palace in Cotai, Macau. In 2018 he was appointed CEO of Wynn Resorts following the resignation of founder Steve Wynn.

In November 2021, Mr. Maddox announced his intention to step down as CEO of Wynn Resorts, effective January 31, 2022. The Company's Board of Directors asked Mr. Maddox to remain on the Wynn Macau, Limited and the Wynn Interactive Boards of Directors, as well as a consultant to Wynn Resorts.

In May 2023, Maddox joined the Executive Board of MidOcean Partners, a New York-based alternative asset manager specializing in middle-market private equity and alternative credit investments.

In January 2025, Maddox was appointed president of Authentic Brands Group. In May 2026, Maddox was promoted to president and chief executive officer of the company to lead Authentic's global enterprise execution and day-to-day operations.

Since joining Authentic, Maddox has overseen a period of significant expansion for the company. In May 2025, Authentic entered a definitive agreement to acquire Dockers from Levi Strauss & Co. for an initial transaction value of $311 million. In June 2025, Authentic announced the launch of its live events division, Authentic Live. In August 2025, Authentic announced the acquisition of a controlling 51% stake in the intellectual property of Guess; the deal closed in January 2026, making Guess the second-largest brand in Authentic's portfolio. In January 2026, Authentic also announced its strategic partnership with globally renowned comedian Kevin Hart to co-own and manage the Kevin Hart brand.

== Awards and recognition ==
In 2020, Maddox was named an HSMAI Hospitality Hero as part of the Adrian Awards, recognizing his leadership during the COVID-19 pandemic. During state-mandated closures, Maddox committed to paying full compensation to all Wynn Resorts employees through May 2020. Under his leadership, Wynn Resorts donated more than $4 million in food and prepared meals, financial aid, personal protective equipment, and essential cleaning and hygiene supplies to health-care facilities and nonprofits across Las Vegas and Boston, and offered complimentary stays at Wynn Las Vegas to 10,000 hospital and medical workers, police, and firefighters.

In 2021, Maddox received the Leadership Confidence Award in the Large Companies category by the Las Vegas Review-Journal and Business Press, based on an anonymous employee survey covering more than 15 categories including job satisfaction, employee engagement, corporate governance, and company values. Wynn Las Vegas was simultaneously ranked the best resort on the Las Vegas Strip.

Under Maddox's tenure as CEO, Wynn Resorts received a series of awards. In 2021, Fortune Magazine included Wynn Resorts on its World's Most Admired Companies list for the 13th consecutive year, with the company ranking first overall in quality of products and services in the hotel, casino, and resort category. That same year, Wynn Resorts was named to the Civic 50 list by Points of Light as one of the 50 most community-minded companies in America, recognized for donating more than $23 million in funds and in-kind contributions, including $4.75 million in direct COVID-19 relief efforts, over 2.5 million pieces of personal protective equipment, and nearly $1 million in food and meals. Wynn Resorts was also named to Forbes' Best Employers for Diversity list and won the Global Gaming Awards Land-Based Operator of the Year, one of the most prestigious honors in the gaming industry.
