= PVH Corp. =

American clothing company

- Formerly: Phillips-Van Heusen Corporation (until 2011)
- Type: Public company
- Traded as: NYSE: PVH; S&P 400 component
- Industry: Clothing
- Founded: 1881; 145 years ago
- Founders: Moses Phillips; John Van Heusen; Dramin Jones
- Headquarters: Manhattan, New York City, United States
- Area served: Worldwide
- Key people: Stefan Larsson (CEO)
- Products: Apparel, undergarment, watches, etc.
- Services: Manufacturing and retailing
- Revenue: ▲US$8.95 billion (2025)
- Net income: ▼US$25.3 million (2025)
- Number of employees: c. 120,000 (2023)
- Divisions: Tommy Hilfiger; Calvin Klein
- Website: www.pvh.com

PVH Corp., formerly known as the Phillips-Van Heusen Corporation, is an American clothing company which owns brands such as Tommy Hilfiger and Calvin Klein. The company also licenses brands such as Kenneth Cole New York and Michael Kors.

== Organization ==
PVH is headquartered in Manhattan, New York City, with policy-making offices in Bridgewater, New Jersey, and handling plants in Jonesville, North Carolina, McDonough, Georgia, and Palmetto, Georgia.

In September 2020, PVH announced that Stefan Larsson was named CEO on February 1, 2021, succeeding Emanuel Chirico, who remains as chairman.

As of April 2023, globally, PVH had over 120,000 employees and was positioned in India, Sri Lanka, Bangladesh, China, Hong Kong, Philippines, Indonesia, Mongolia, Thailand, Malaysia, Taiwan, Singapore, Vietnam and Honduras.

== History ==
=== 19th to early 20th century ===
The history of Phillips-Van Heusen goes back in part to Dramin Jones, a Prussian immigrant who founded the shirt manufacturing company D. Jones & Sons, c. 1865. Separately, in 1881, Moses Phillips and his wife Endel began sewing shirts by hand and selling them from pushcarts to local anthracite coal-miners in Pottsville, Pennsylvania. This grew into a shirt business in New York City that placed one of the first ever shirt advertisements in the Saturday Evening Post. D. Jones & Sons merged with M. Phillips & Sons in 1907 under the name Phillips-Jones after Dramin Jones's death in 1903. Later Isaac Phillips met John Van Heusen, resulting both in their most popular line of shirts (Van Heusen), and in the subsequent acquisition of Van Heusen by Phillips-Jones and its renaming to Phillips-Van Heusen in 1957. PVH is partly named after Dutch immigrant John Manning van Heusen, who in 1910 invented a new process that fused cloth on a curve.

=== 20th century ===
The Phillips-Jones Corporation received a patent for a self-folding collar in 1919; the corporation released the product to the public in 1921 and it became successful. The first collar-attached shirt was introduced in 1929. The Bass Weejun was introduced in 1936. Geoffrey Beene shirts were launched in 1982. In 1987, Phillips-Van Heusen acquired G. H. Bass. In 1995, the corporation acquired the Izod brand, followed by the Arrow brand in 2000, and the Calvin Klein company in 2002.

=== 21st century ===
In 2004, PVH began manufacturing clothing for the Donald J. Trump Signature Collection as part of a licensing agreement with Donald Trump.

After acquiring Superba, Inc., in January 2007, PVH owned necktie licenses for brands such as Arrow, DKNY, Tommy Hilfiger, Nautica, Perry Ellis, Ted Baker, Michael Kors, JOE Joseph Abboud, Original Penguin and Jones New York. The corporation began making men's clothing under the Timberland name in 2008, with women's clothing following in 2009, under a licensing agreement.

On March 15, 2010, Phillips-Van Heusen acquired Tommy Hilfiger for $3 billion. In the third quarter of 2010 losses made on the "Van Heusen" brand led to the decision to pull it out of all European trading markets. As of March 2011 the company sells no products under that name in Europe. All European staff became redundant as a result.

In 2011, Phillips-Van Heusen was renamed to PVH.

In February 2013, PVH acquired Warnaco Group, which manufactured the Calvin Klein underwear, jeans and sportswear lines under license, thus consolidating control of the Calvin Klein brand. The Warnaco acquisition also added the Warner's and Olga intimate apparel brands, as well as the Speedo swimwear brand (the latter in North America only). In November 2013 PVH sold the G.H. Bass brand and all of its assets, images and licenses to G-III Apparel Group.

PVH ended its licensing agreement with Trump in July 2015, after Macy's discontinued sales of his Trump Signature Collection due to controversial comments that he made regarding undocumented immigrants.

In 2017 Forbes ranked PVH 25th out of 890 companies on the "Just company" list.

In March 2017, PVH acquired lingerie brand True & Co.

In June 2018, PVH acquired the Geoffrey Beene clothing brand, which PVH previously produced under license. On August 28, 2018, PVH announced that it would expand the Izod brand to portions of Europe beginning with the Fall/Winter 2018 collection.

In December 2019, CNBC listed PVH along with 91 additional Fortune 500 companies that "paid an effective federal tax rate of 0% or less" in 2018 as a result of Donald Trump's Tax Cuts and Jobs Act of 2017.

In January 2020, PVH sold back the rights for the Speedo swimwear brand, previously marketed under "Speedo USA" and "Speedo North America", back to Speedo's international parent, the British Pentland Group for $170 million.

In May 2021, PVH was exploring a sale of the Heritage Brands division consisting of Van Heusen, Izod, Arrow, Warner's, Olga, True & Co., and Geoffrey Beene, with Authentic Brands Group as a potential buyer. The sale to ABG was officially announced on June 23, 2021, consisting of Izod, Van Heusen, Arrow, and Geoffrey Beene. The sale closed on August 2, 2021. Under Authentic Brands Group, United Legwear & Apparel Company was granted the license for the Van Heusen, Arrow, and Geoffrey Beene brands, while Centric Brands was granted the license for the Izod brand. A sale of the Warner's, Olga, and True&Co brands to Basic Resources followed in November 2023.

In July 2022, PVH announced the creation of the first sustainable supply chain finance program tied to environment and social factors, in partnership with HSBC Bank USA.

On February 4, 2025, China placed PVH Corp on its "Unreliable Entities List" as part of its response to U.S. President Donald Trump's second round of tariffs against it. The company said it was "surprised and deeply disappointed" by the decision as it said it had operated in China in "strict compliance with all relevant laws and regulations and operates in line with established industry standards and practices." PVH had been under investigation by Chinese regulators for allegedly boycotting the use of cotton from Xinjiang.

== Distribution ==
PVH provides products to many popular department stores, such as JCPenney, Macy's, Myer, David Jones, Kohl's, Belk and Dillard's as well as online retailer Amazon both through its own labels and private label agreements. PVH also sells its products directly to customers through about 700 outlet stores under the brand names Van Heusen, Tommy Hilfiger and Calvin Klein.

The Calvin Klein stores sell the full range of products at full price, differing from existing outlet stores. These stores range from 10,000 square feet (930 m^{2}) to 20,000 square feet (1,900 m^{2}).

The brands are sold in different price segments; for the dresswear and business-casual brands, from lowest to highest priced are Arrow, Van Heusen, Geoffrey Beene, Pierre Cardin and Calvin Klein. For the preppy-styled brands, Izod occupies a more moderate price range while Tommy Hilfiger occupies a more premium segment.

Phillips-Van Heusen closed its Geoffrey Beene outlet retail division in 2008. Approximately 25 percent of the Geoffrey Beene outlet stores became Calvin Klein stores, while the remaining 75 percent of stores closed entirely. The company continued to license the Geoffrey Beene brand name for Geoffrey Beene brand dress shirts and men's sportswear until 2018 when it acquired the brand outright. In 2015, PVH closed its Izod retail division due to an increasing competitive environment driven by more premium brands in the outlet retail channel; this did not affect Izod's wholesale business to department stores and online retailers. Select Izod products are now available at some Van Heusen stores; initially this only included the golf line, but now includes products from Izod's other lines (mostly from the Advantage and Saltwater lines). In July 2018, PVH launched a direct online sales platform on the Izod and Van Heusen websites where both brands are featured and can be cross-shopped on each other's site. On July 14, 2020, PVH announced that it would close its remaining Heritage Brands retail outlets operating mainly under the Van Heusen/Izod Golf names. The Izod and Van Heusen brands are not being discontinued; the wholesale business, which sells their product to department stores, warehouse clubs, and online retailers, is not affected. The direct online sales platform for the Izod and Van Heusen brands will also remain active.

== Marketing ==
In October 2007, PVH took over naming rights to the Meadowlands Sports Complex arena in East Rutherford, New Jersey. The arena's name was changed to the Izod Center, effective on October 31, 2007. PVH paid about $1.4 million a year for two years, then paid $750,000 a year in addition to $100,000 per year to supply arena employees with Izod uniforms. In 2015, the Izod Center was permanently closed.

== Controversies ==
=== Sexist advertising ===
The "Show Her It's a Man's World" 1951 for Van Heusen ties has since been cited in academic literature regarding the history of advertising and media perpetuation of harmful, sexist gender stereotypes. The ad featured a man sitting comfortably in bed, wearing only a Van Heusen shirt and tie, while a woman is depicted on her knees beside the bed, smiling as she serves him breakfast on a tray, with headline declaring, "Show her it's a man's world," positioning the tie as a tool to establish a patriarchic hierarchy.

=== Environmental practices ===
In July 2011, PVH—along with other major fashion and sportswear brands including Nike, Adidas and Abercrombie & Fitch—was the subject of a report by the environmental group Greenpeace entitled "Dirty Laundry". PVH is accused of working with suppliers in China who, according to the findings of the report, contribute to the pollution of the Yangtze and Pearl Rivers. Samples taken from one facility belonging to the Youngor Group located on the Yangtze River Delta and another belonging to the Well Dyeing Factory Ltd. located on a tributary of the Pearl River Delta revealed the presence of hazardous and persistent hormone disruptor chemicals, including alkylphenols, perfluorinated compounds, and perfluorooctane sulfonate.

In 2020, PVH announced for its sustainability policy for its Izod and Van Heusen brands to eliminate single use plastic from packaging by 2024, and use 100% sustainable cotton, polyester, and nylon by 2025.

=== Use of animals ===
Concerns have arisen about PVH's practices with regards to animal testing. In 2020, PVH announced that as part of their animal welfare policy, the company does not use exotic skins and would be banning their use in Tommy Hilfiger and Calvin Klein collections when "our annual update of that policy is released."

=== Tax avoidance ===
In 2018 PVH along with 90 additional Fortune 500 companies had "paid an effective federal tax rate of 0% or less" as a result of Donald Trump's Tax Cuts and Jobs Act of 2017.

== See also ==
- Iconix Brand Group
