= Wilsons Leather =

Leather brand

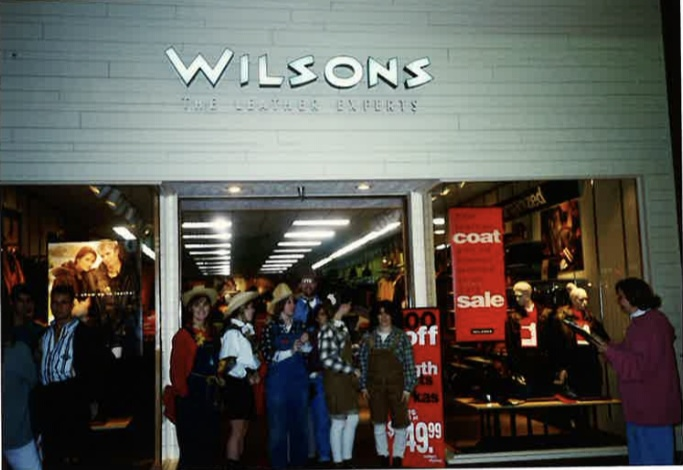
- Wilson's Leather Store inside Southern Park Mall
- Formerly: Berman Buckskin, Wilson's House of Suede, Wilson's House of Suede & Leather, Wilson's: The Leather Experts
- Type: Subsidiary
- Industry: Retail
- Predecessor: Berman Brothers Fur, Wool and Hides (1899); Wilsons House of Suede (1950s)
- Founded: 1899; 127 years ago
- Successor: G-III Apparel Group
- Headquarters: Minneapolis, Minnesota, United States
- Products: Leather apparel and accessories
- Parent: Melville Corporation 1982-1996; G-III Apparel Group
- Website: wilsonsleather.com

Wilsons Leather is a U.S. leather brand, selling products such as leather jackets, belts, shoes, handbags, and gloves. At its peak in 2002, the Minneapolis-based retailer had 763 stores in 46 states and Canada. The company stores used to sell product assortments from brands such as DKNY, Michael Kors, Guess?, and Cole Haan.

== History ==
The company began as two separate leather apparel manufacturer-retailers: Berman Buckskin, founded in 1899, as Berman Brothers Fur, Wool and Hides founded by David, Ephraim and Alexander Berman, and after World War II, reinvented as a fringed buckskin shirt and jacket retailer, and Wilsons House of Suede, founded in late 1950 in Beverly Hills California by Jerry Wilson and known for its high fashion styles. In 1964 the sons of Jerry Wilson took over the one store and in 1970 the three sons Tony Wilson, Jeffrey Wilson, and Brian Wilson developed TV commercials with them in it and became one of the first clothing retailers to advertise on TV.

In 1975, Wilson Leather stores began having their products made overseas, which made them affordable to a much larger customer base. Directed by the three brothers Wilson Leather stores started opening in regional shopping centers throughout the country.

Wilsons House of Suede and Leather was acquired by Melville Corporation in 1982. After Melville purchased Bermans from W. R. Grace and Company, it merged the two retailers under the Wilsons Leather name in summer of 1986. Melville added new acquisition Georgetown Leather Design to the division in 1993 and operated Wilsons Leather until 1996, when it sold Wilsons to a management-led investor group.

The newly independent Wilsons Leather filed IPO plans in October 1996 to raise $42 million, but went public in May 1997 with a scaled-back target of $10 million. On August 2, 1997, Wilson's operated a total store count of 452 stores. After launching an online store in 1999, Wilsons expanded into luggage and travel items by acquiring El Portal, Bentley's Luggage and California Luggage Outlet. The 135 travel stores were closed in late 2002 after several quarters of losses.

The company refocused in 2003, reducing their product offerings and closing several dozen underperforming stores. The company scaled back its operations again in 2004, laying off about 1,000 employees and closing nearly 100 stores. At the beginning of 2004, Wilsons operated 598 stores, down from 763 in November 2002. The company continued paring back its number of stores, to 453 by October 2004 and 428 by December 2005. More closings in 2007 brought the total number of Wilsons stores to 411 by October 2007. The closure of 160 stores was announced in February 2008 and by May 2008, the company operated 228 stores in 39 states.

In July 2008, the company sold the Wilsons brand name, online store and 116 outlet stores to G-III Apparel Group. The company formerly known as Wilsons changed its name to PreVu Inc.. PreVu was delisted by NASDAQ on August 4, 2008, then announced it was going out of business on August 14, 2008, and would liquidate its 100 mall stores by October. In 2009, AM Retail Group purchased the company, in partners with GH Bass Co as well.

In 2020, the top manager of G-III Apparel Group announced they would close 110 selling stores directly managed by Wilson's Leather as a part of their reorganization plan while the brand continues its online business.

== See also ==
- Lyle Berman
