= Bass Boarding House =

Historic house in Maine, United States

- U.S. National Register of Historic Places
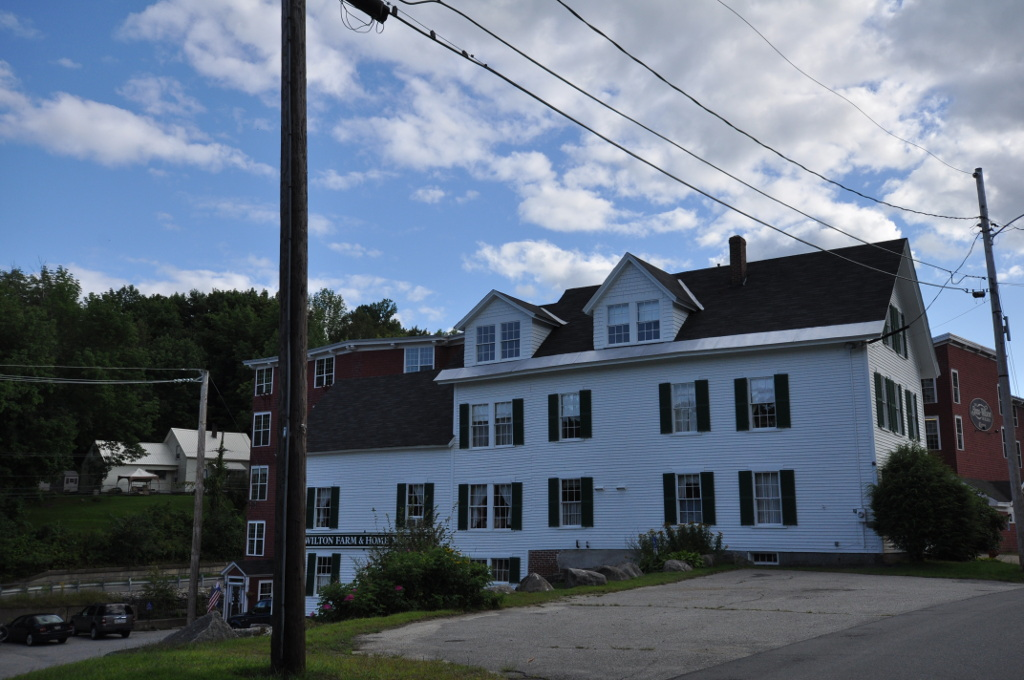

- Location within Maine Location within the United States
- Nearest city: Wilton, Maine
- Coordinates: 44.58682°N 70.23231°W
- Area: less than one acre
- NRHP reference No.: 88000396
- Added to NRHP: 1988

The Bass Boarding House is an historic house on Canal Street in Wilton, Maine, United States. It was built in 1860s, and adapted for use as worker housing for G.H. Bass & Co., whose former factory building stands next door. The building, one of a few that survive in Wilton that were adapted in this way, was added to the National Register of Historic Places in 1988. It now houses the Wilton Historical Society's Wilton Farm and Home Museum.

== Description ==
The house is a 2 1/2-story wood-frame structure on a granite foundation, with a large rear ell. It has a gable roof with the end gable facing the front (western) facade. This facade is three bays wide, with the entry at the southwest corner. The door is framed by narrow sidelight windows and topped by a modest entablature. There are sash windows in the bays on the second floor, and two windows in the gable peak. The roof is pierced on both sides by gabled dormers, although their placement is not uniform or symmetrical. The interior of the house is largely preserved, but modest in style; the lower level of the ell is a large open space.

== History ==
The significant history of the property begins in 1861, when it was purchased, along with an adjacent mill, by Emerson and Rawson Fuller. The main block of the house was apparently built by Rawson Fuller not long afterward, and was his family home until the early 1900s. It was probably converted by Rawson for use as a boarding house prior to its acquisition in 1911 by George H. Bass.

Bass, a tanner by training, had been in the shoemaking business since at least 1871. He acquired Fuller's mill in 1904, and erected the now-standing Bass factory on its site. In order to provide housing for his factory workers, Bass adopted several strategies. He built modest tenement houses in Wilton, and he acquired existing properties and adapted them for use by his workers. This resulted in the dispersed nature of worker housing in Wilton, unlike more formally planned mill housing complexes found elsewhere. Bass purchased this house in 1911, and it served as worker housing until 1937. It was acquired by the Wilton Historical Society in 1987.

== Wilton Farm and Home Museum ==
The Wilton Farm and Home Museum is a local history museum. Exhibits include historic household items, tools used in crafts and trades such as farming, shoe making and blacksmithing, clothing, a collection of Maine bottles, and displays of local history and culture.

== See also ==
- National Register of Historic Places listings in Franklin County, Maine
