= Vilebrequin =

French luxury swimwear

- Industry: Retail
- Founded: Saint-Tropez, France; 1971; 55 years ago
- Founder: Fred Prysquel
- Headquarters: Geneva, Switzerland
- Key people: Fred Prysquel; Loïc Berthet; Roland Herlory
- Products: Swim wear, Resort wear, Accessories
- Parent: G-III Apparel Group
- Website: www.vilebrequin.com

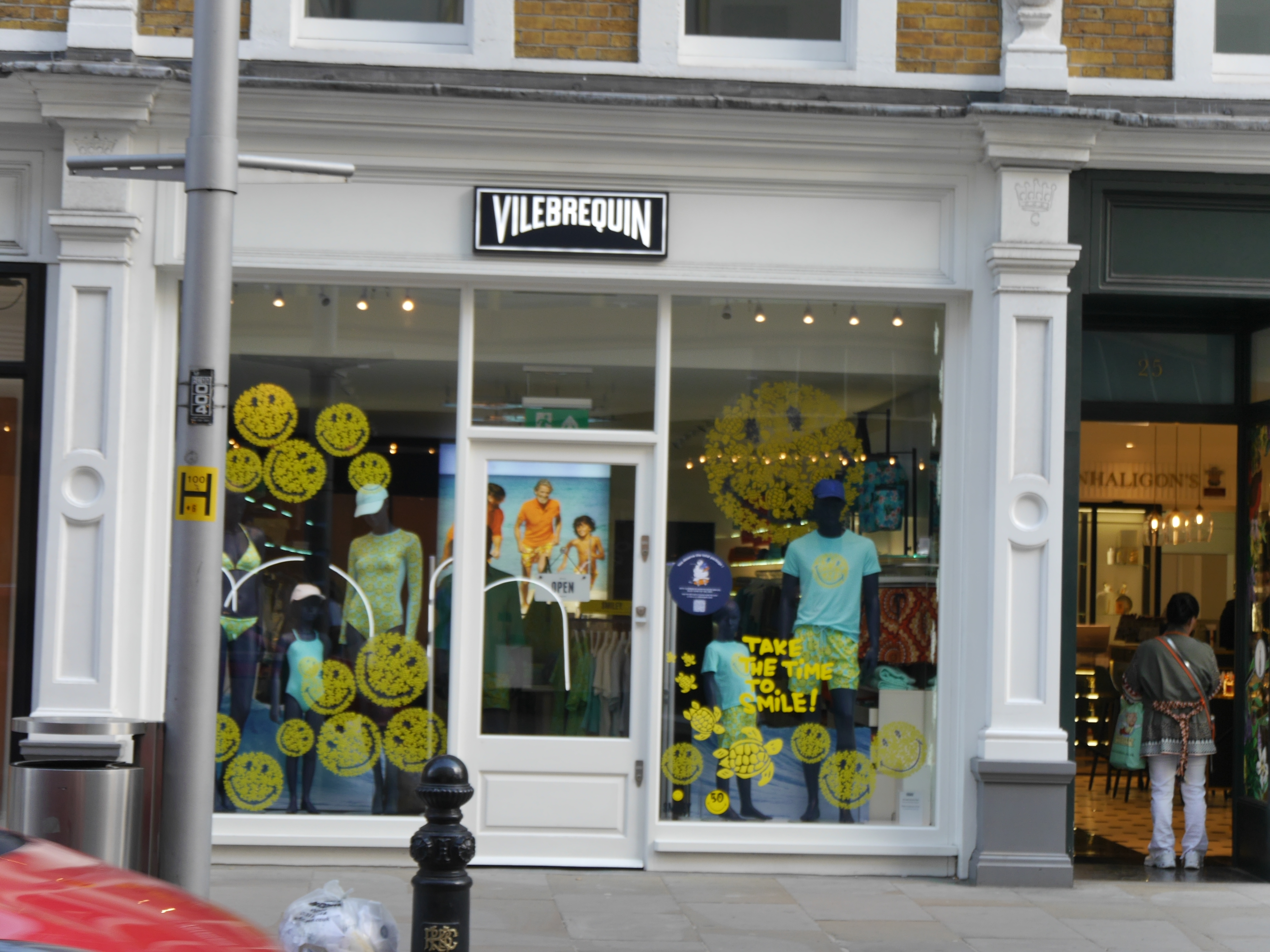
Vilebrequin, King's Road, London, 2022

Vilebrequin (French pronunciation: [vilbʁəkɛ̃]) is a French luxury brand specializing in swimwear and ready-to-wear for men and women. The brand was created in 1971 in Saint-Tropez by Fred Prysquel, a photographer and sports automobile journalist, and Yvette, a fashion designer. Fred is colorblind; thus Yvette picks out the colors. The brand has stores in Saint-Tropez, Paris, Beverly Hills, Las Vegas, Milan, Monte Carlo, Seoul, New York City and Washington DC, among others. It was due to Prysquel's passion for automobiles that he named his brand Vilebrequin, the French word for "crankshaft".

== History ==
In 1971, Fred Prysquel, photographer and automobile journalist, sketched and cut out a swimsuit design from a paper tablecloth in a Saint Tropezian café. Inspired by the swimsuits of surfers at the time, he created a longer boxer short style much different than the shorter and fitted swimsuits of that period. Designed from spinnaker cloth, his l swimsuit was bright, original and designed to dry quickly in the sun.

In 1991, fellow Tropezian and textile worker, Loïc Berthet, took over the brand and added new styles and models. To men's swim trunks, he added a back pocket secured with Velcro, eyelet holes made from a stainless alloy, Zamac, and a cotton lining.

In 1994, Vilebrequin expanded its collection to include boys' garments.

Between 1990 and 2000, the brand expanded worldwide and opened locations in London, Alassio, Paris, Geneva, New York, Hong Kong and Madrid. The brand also developed a network of distribution partners in over 50 countries.

In 2012, Vilebrequin was acquired by the American company G-III Apparel Group, Ltd., which also licenses Calvin Klein, DKNY, and Karl Lagerfeld Paris. Roland Herlory, prior general director for Hermès Latin America and Caribbean, became the new CEO.

In 2013, after more than 40 years in menswear, Vilebrequin launched their first ladies' line and extended their product offering to also include resort wear as well as luxury beach accessories for both men and women.

In 2014, Vilebrequin opened stores with a particular focus on expansion throughout Asia with openings in South Korea, Thailand and Singapore.

In 2013, the brand released a men's collector swimsuit embroidered in gold thread with solely 20 models available. In 2014, the model was replicated and sapphire elements were added.

In 2020, the brand collaborated with American artist Derrick Adams to create a capsule collection of swim shorts, inspired by Adams’ ‘Floaters’ series.

In 2025 Fiat released the Topolino Vilebrequin Collector’s Edition featuring a built-in shower among other things.

== Distribution ==
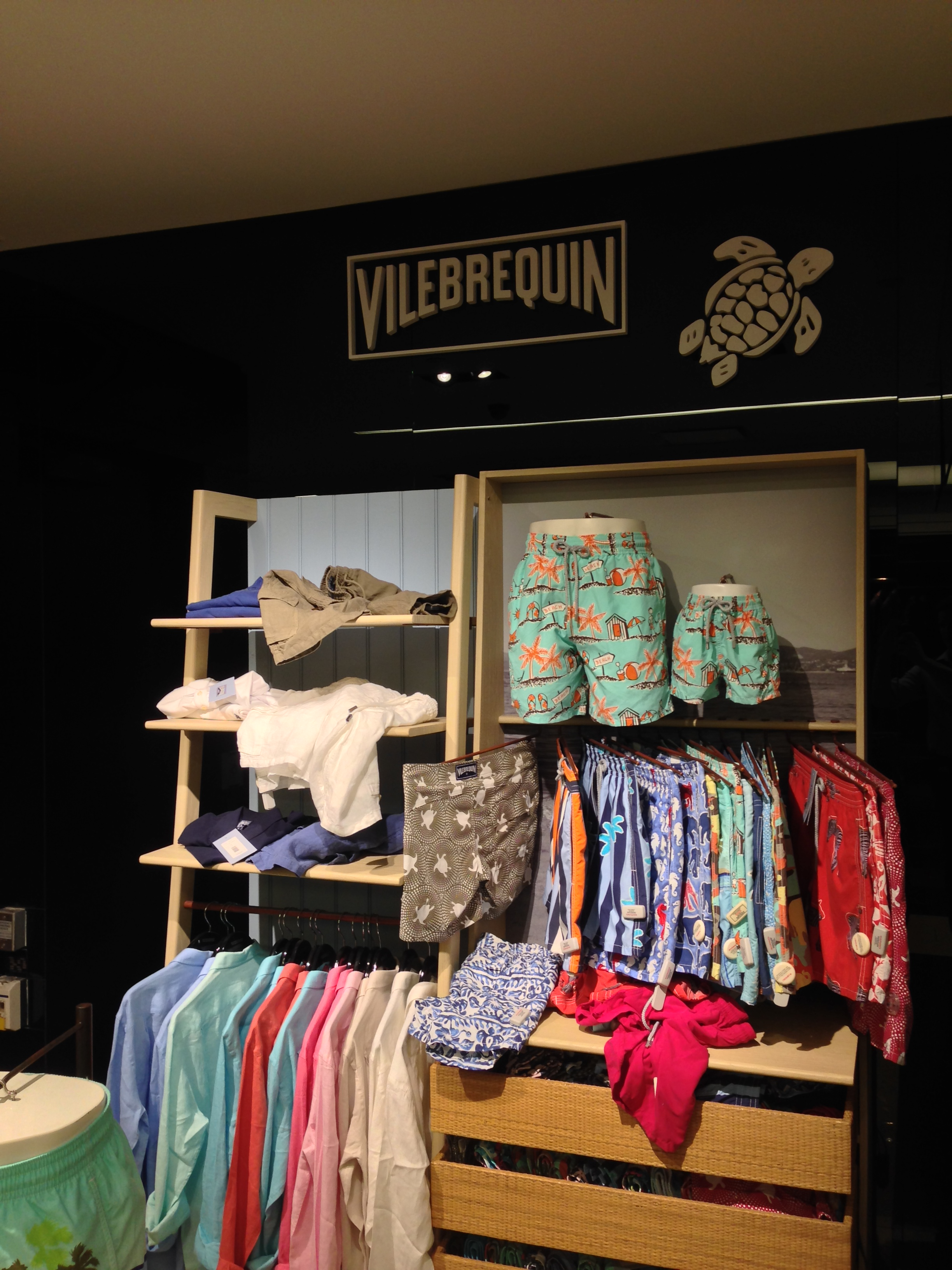
Vilebrequin display in the Manhattan 59th Street Bloomingdale's

As of 2014, Vilebrequin is present across 5 continents and in 52 countries with more than 150 stores. The brand has e-shops in Europe and the United States.
