= G-III Apparel Group =

American clothing company

G-III Apparel Group, Ltd.
- Formerly: G&N Sportswear, G-III Leather Fashions, Inc
- Type: Public
- Traded as: Nasdaq: GIII; S&P 600 component
- Industry: Fashion, apparel, accessories
- Founded: 1956; 70 years ago
- Founder: Aron Goldfarb
- Headquarters: New York City, U.S.
- Key people: Morris Goldfarb (CEO and chairman); Sammy Aaron (president and vice chairman); Dana Perlman (chief growth and operations officer); Jeffrey Goldfarb (executive vice president); Neal S. Nackman (CFO)
- Products: Apparel and accessories
- Revenue: US$3.23bn (FY 2023)
- Number of employees: 3,600 full time; 1,100 part-time (2023)
- Website: www.giii.com

G-III Apparel Group is an American clothing company that designs, manufactures, markets, and sells women's and men's apparel with a global portfolio of licensed, owned, and private label brands, including DKNY, Donna Karan, Karl Lagerfeld, Vilebrequin, Nautica, Halston, and G.H. Bass.

== History ==
=== Early history ===
The company was founded in New York's Garment District in 1956 by Aron Goldfarb, a Polish-born Holocaust survivor. In 1972 Goldfarb's son, Morris, joined the company, which was then known as G&N Sportswear and specialized in leather outwear. Morris immediately helped the company diversify and expand its sourcing.

In 1974 the company was reorganized as G-III Leather Fashions, Inc. In 1981, G-III launched its Siena Leather division, which offered more fashionable women's leather apparel. In 1986 the company was generating revenues of $20 million, and by 1988 G-III was one of the largest importers and wholesalers of leather clothing in the United States.

In 1988 G-III partnered with football player Carl Banks and reached a licensing deal with the National Football League to design and manufacture leather team jackets.

=== Public offering and expansion (1989-2004) ===
In 1989 G-III's revenues were nearly $100 million and the company operated a branch office in Asia. That same year, G-III became a publicly traded company, listed as G-III Apparel Group, Ltd.

In 1993, G-III extended its licensing deal with the National Football League. Over the next several years, G-III reached similar deals with NASCAR, Major League Baseball, National Hockey League, National Basketball Association, and major colleges.

In 1995 G-III reached a licensing agreement with Kenneth Cole to produce and market outerwear. This agreement was followed by similar licensing arrangements with other brands.

In 2002 Morris Goldfarb's son, Jeffrey Goldfarb, joined the company.

=== Acquisitions and further growth (2005-present) ===
G-III completed a series of acquisitions and licensing deals in the mid-2000s that added prominent brands to the company's portfolio while expanding production capabilities. In 2005 G-III acquired two privately held outerwear businesses, Marvin Richards and Winlit, that held licenses for apparel produced under different brand names, including Calvin Klein and Tommy Hilfiger. The company then began to diversify its offerings beyond outerwear and into new apparel categories like women's dresses, sportswear, and performance wear. In 2007, the company acquired the Jessica Howard and Eliza J brands.

In 2008, G-III acquired assets from retail outlet chain Wilsons Leather. These assets included 116 outlet stores, online retail operations, and a distribution center, and the deal marked the company's first large-scale venture into retail. That same year, G-III acquired the company Andrew Marc.

Further acquisitions in the 2010s and 2020s increased G-III’s portfolio of owned brands and allowed the company to expand globally while increasing its direct-to-consumer distribution channels.

In 2012 G-III acquired the luxury swimwear brand Vilebrequin, which became the first international owned brand in G-III's portfolio. The following year it acquired footwear brand G.H. Bass. In 2015, G-III entered into a joint venture with another luxury brand, Karl Lagerfeld, to create and launch the Karl Lagerfeld Paris label in North America. The company acquired Donna Karan International, the parent company of Donna Karan and DKNY, in 2016.

G-III acquired French fashion brand Sonia Rykiel in 2021.

In 2022, G-III acquired the remaining stake in Karl Lagerfeld.

In 2023, the company announced licensing deals to design, manufacture, and distribute Nautica and Halston.

== Operations ==
The company designs, sources, manufactures, markets, and sells women's and men's clothing, outerwear, hats, jewelry, and other accessories under licensed, owned, and private label brands. The company also licenses its owned brands for other products and partnerships.

G-III is headquartered in New York and has international offices in Canada, China, Italy, Paris, the Netherlands, and Switzerland. G-III distributes its products through freestanding stores and shops along with international digital channels. The company also sources and manufactures products with global partners.

Morris Goldfarb is the chief executive officer of G-III.

== Brands ==
G-III owns and licenses more than 30 global fashion brands, and maintains licensing agreements with major U.S. sports leagues and more than 150 U.S. colleges and universities.

Some of the company's brand ownership and licensing relationships are summarized below:

Name	Owned or licensed	Acquired in
Karl Lagerfeld	Owned	2022
Sonia Rykiel	Owned	2021
Donna Karan New York	Owned	2016
DKNY	Owned	2016
Karl Lagerfeld Paris	Owned	2015
G.H. Bass	Owned	2013
Vilebrequin	Owned	2012
Andrew Marc	Owned	2008
Wilsons Leather	Owned	2008
Eliza J	Owned	2007
Jessica Howard	Owned	2007
G-III Sports	Owned	1988
Converse	Licensed	2024
Champion	Licensed	2023
Halston	Licensed	2023
Nautica	Licensed	2023
Margaritaville	Licensed	2021
Vince Camuto	Licensed	2011
Dockers	Licensed	2008
Levi's	Licensed	2008
Calvin Klein	Licensed	2005
Cole Haan	Licensed	2005
Tommy Hilfiger	Licensed	2005
NASCAR	Licensed	2004
Major League Baseball	Licensed	1999
National Basketball Association	Licensed	1998
National Hockey League	Licensed	1996
Kenneth Cole	Licensed	1995
National Football League	Licensed	1988

== Welfare concerns ==
Some of G-III's factories, producing brands such as Andrew Marc and Ivanka Trump, have been accused of flouting serious animal or human welfare principles. An audit by the Fair Labor Association of a G-III contracted Chinese factory in October 2016, found excessive overtime which violated Chinese law, low wages, and workspace safety concerns. A 2017 report by the Guardian on a contracted factory in Indonesia found extremely low wages and unpaid overtime.

== See also ==
- Andrew Marc Dog fur controversy
