= Slip-on shoe =

Type of low, lace-less shoe

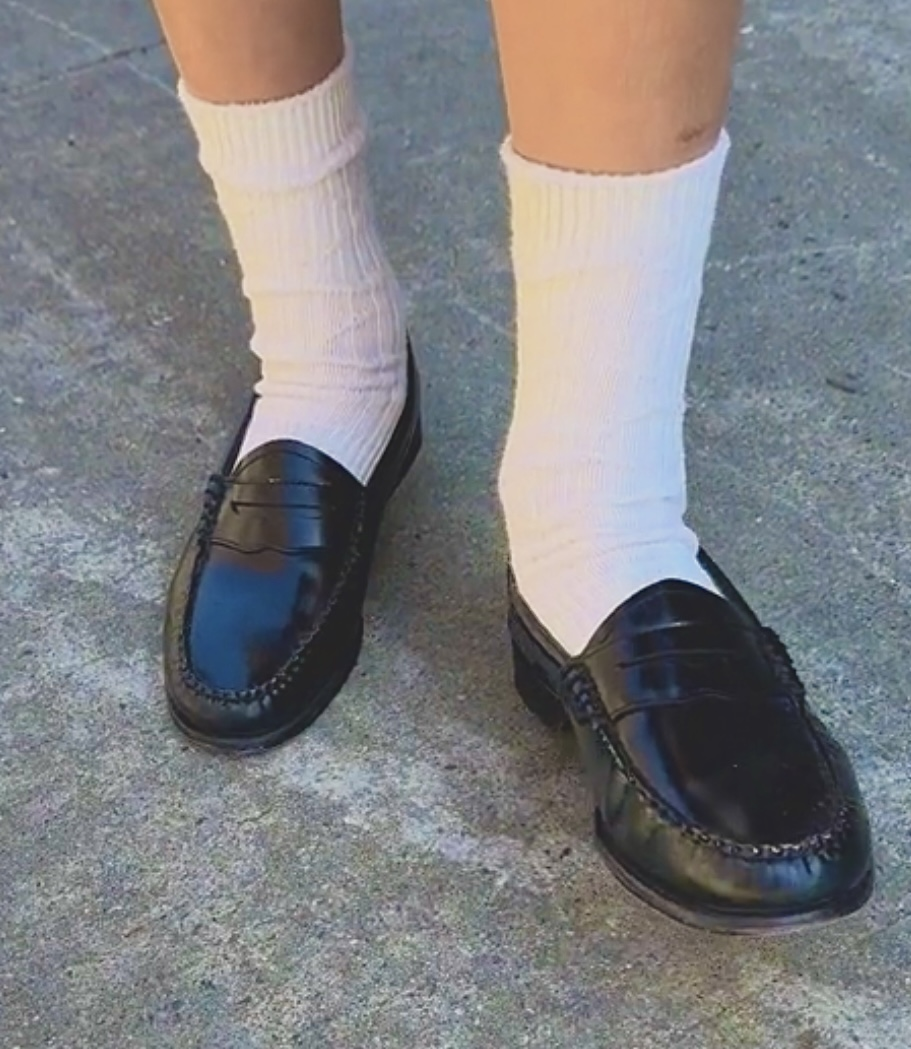
A teenage boy wearing a pair of black loafers in New York City, United States

Slip-ons are typically low, lace-less shoes. The style which is most commonly seen, known as a loafer, slippers, or penny loafers in American culture, has a moccasin construction. One of the first designs was introduced in London by Wildsmith Shoes, called the Wildsmith Loafer. They began as casual shoes, but have increased in popularity to the point of being worn in America with business suits. Another design was introduced as the Aurlandskoen (lit. 'the Aurland Shoe') in Norway (early 20th century).

A less casual, earlier type of slip-on is made with side goring (sometimes called a dress loafer). Made in the same shape as common lace-up Oxfords, but lacking the laces, these shoes have elasticated inserts on the side which allow the shoe to be easily removed but remain snug when worn. This particular style is most popular in Britain.

== Loafers ==
=== History ===
The "Wildsmith Loafer" made by Raymond Lewis Wildsmith of Wildsmith Shoes was designed for King George VI as a casual house shoe. This was the first loafer. The shoe has subsequently been marketed and sold by other London shoe firms and dubbed "the Harrow".

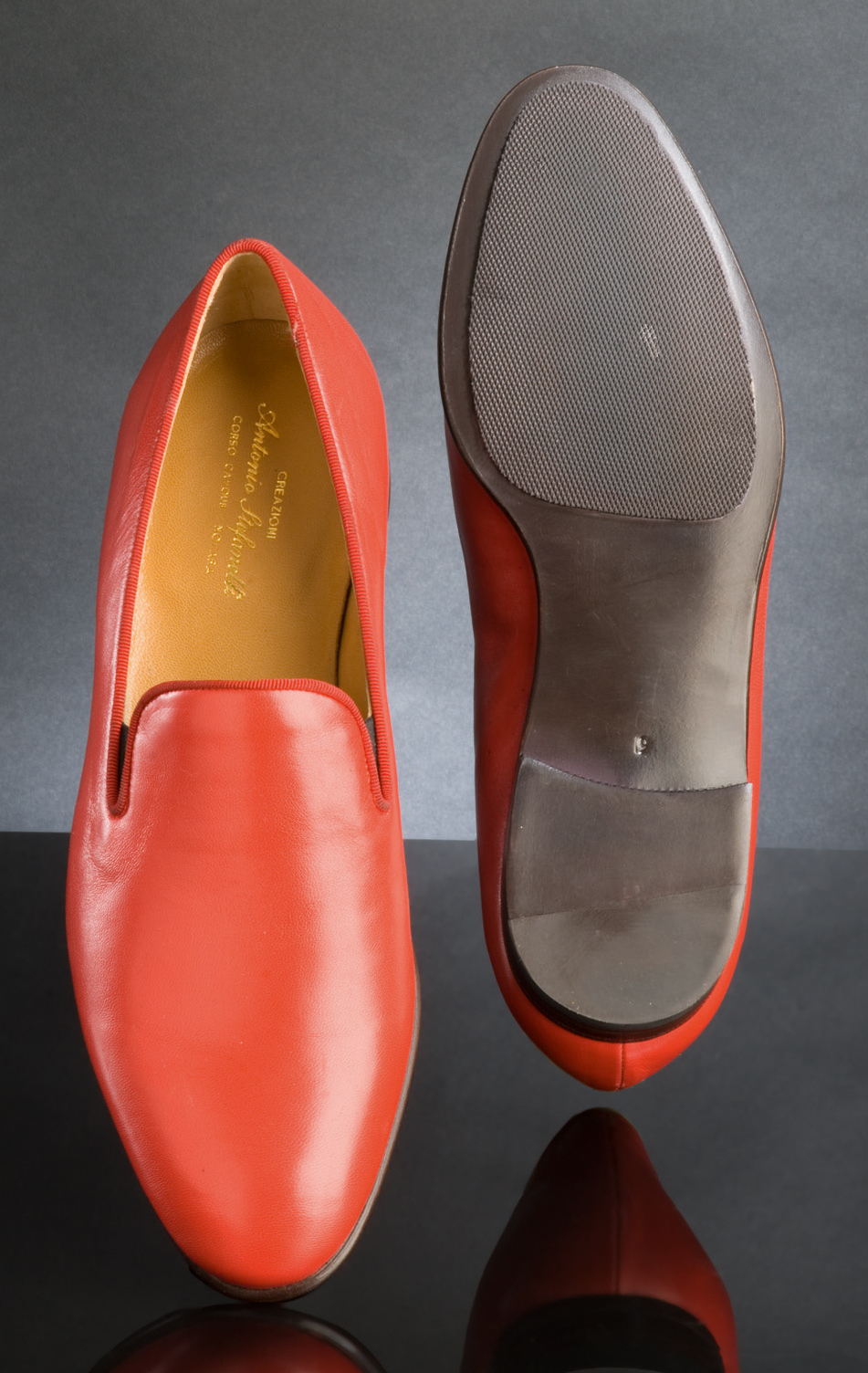
Papal shoes worn by Pope Benedict XVI

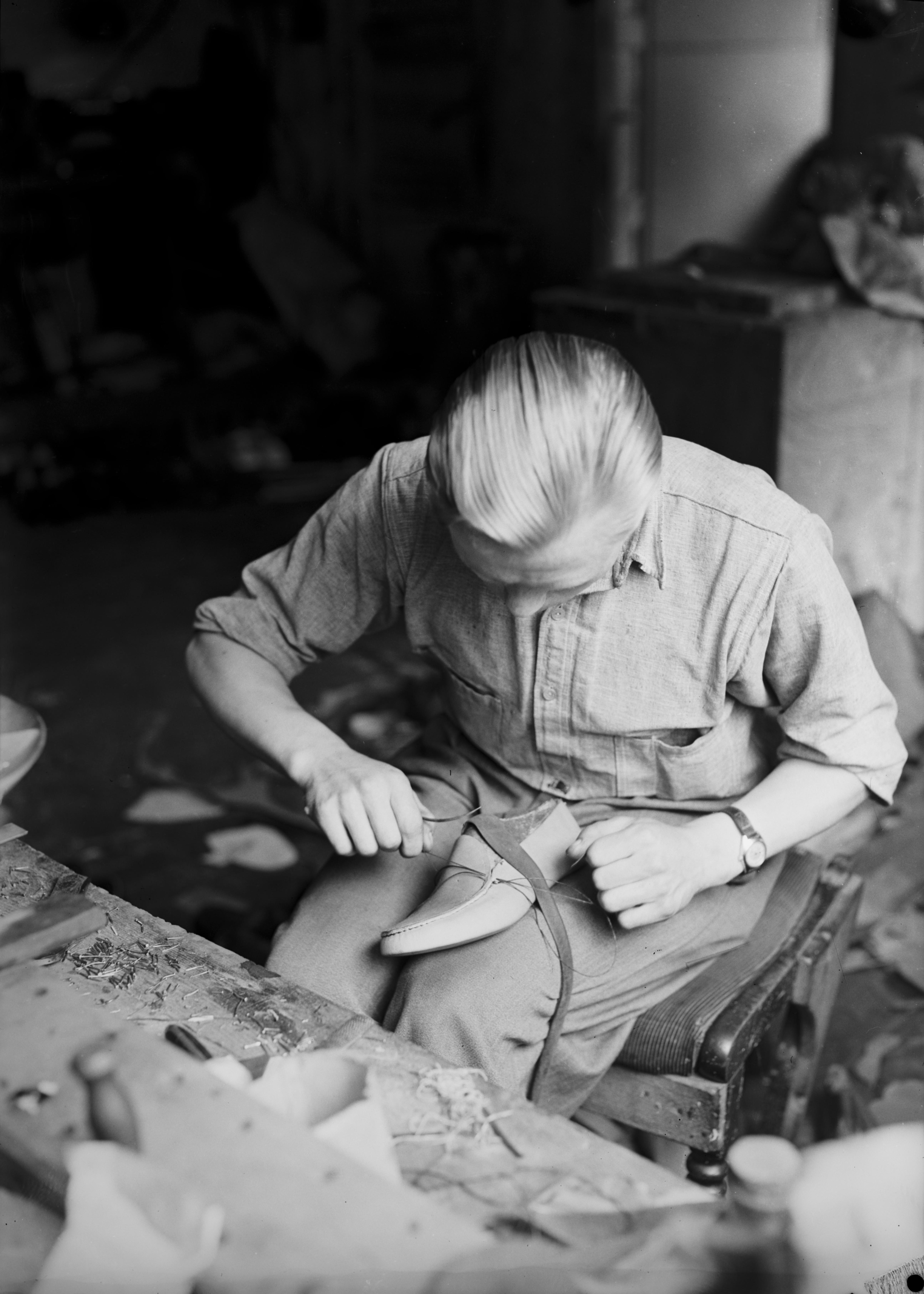
Manufacturing of Aurlandsko in Aurland around 1950

Shoemaker Nils Gregoriusson Tveranger (1874–1953) in Aurland Municipality, Norway, introduced his first design around 1908. Tveranger obtained protection for the design. N. Tveranger obtained a diploma at the Bergen exhibition in 1910 for his "Aurland shoe". The first Aurland shoes were also made with laces and a decorative upper side similar to the brogue shoe. Colors were initially natural until approximately 1960, when they were also painted black. At age 13, Tveranger went to North America, where he learned the craft of shoemaking and returned to Norway at age 20. Around 1930, Tveranger introduced a new design called the "Aurland moccasin", later renamed the "Aurland shoe". This design resembles the moccasins worn by the Iroquois as well as the moccasin-like shoes traditionally worn by locals in Aurland. These traditional shoes resembled slippers and were useful outdoors in fine weather. In 1936, the local shoe handcraft in Aurland was described as a "very old industry", and shoes were sold in large numbers to foreign visitors. A 1953 catalog listed about 10 shoe factories in the small village of Aurland. When exported to the USA, the Aurland shoes were called "Norwegian Moccasins". The Norwegians began exporting them to the rest of Europe, where they were taken up by visiting Americans, and championed by the American Esquire magazine. Some photographs included in the Esquire feature were of Norwegian farmers in a cattle-loafing area. The Spaulding family in New Hampshire started making shoes based on this design in the early 1930s, naming them loafers, a general term for slip-on shoes which is still in use in America. In 1934, G.H. Bass shoemaker of Wilton, Maine started making loafers under the name Weejuns (sounding like Norwegians). These loafers had a distinctive addition: a strip of leather across the saddle with a diamond cutout. Initially worn only in the summer at home, the shoe grew in popularity in America, becoming a significant part of men's casual shoe wardrobes; in Europe, the style has never reached the same level of ubiquity.

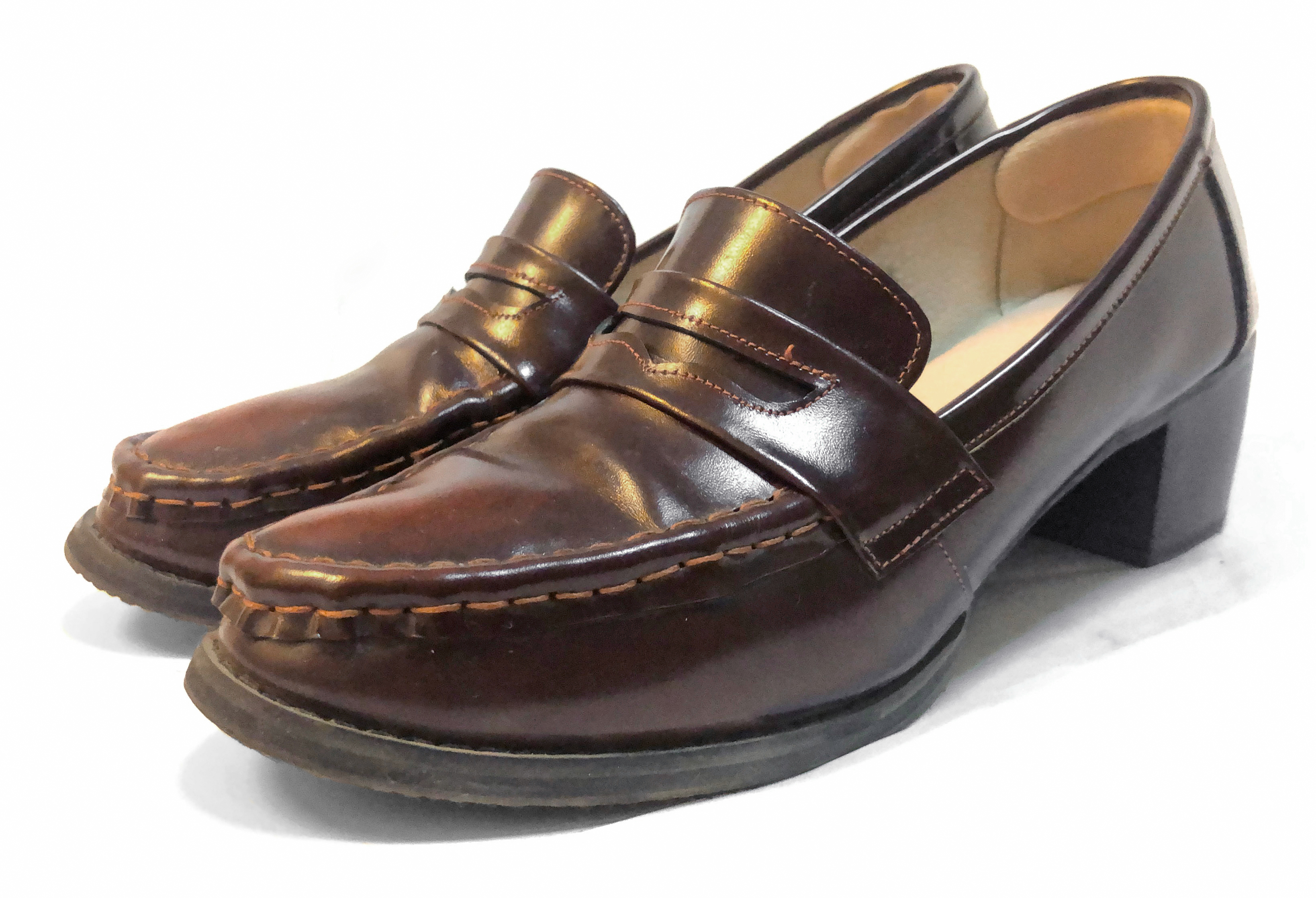
A traditional cordovan penny loafer

The term penny loafer has uncertain origins. One explanation is that, in the 1950s, American prep school students, wishing to make a fashion statement, took to inserting a penny into the diamond-shaped slit on their Weejuns. Either way, the name penny loafer came to be applied to this slip-on style and has stuck.

In the mid-1950s, further continental influences brought a more elegant image to light: lower-cut slip-ons, which moved from purely casual use to pairing with suits in the 1960s (but still only in America). In 1966, Italian designer Gucci made the further step of adding a metal strap across the front in the shape of a horse's snaffle bit. These Gucci loafers (now a general term for shoes of this style from any manufacturer) also spread across the Atlantic. They were worn by 1970s business people, becoming almost a Wall Street uniform and reaching widespread use by the 1980s.

At the start of the twenty-first century, a revival of penny loafers, whose popularity had peaked during the mid- to late 1960s and again during the early 1980s to early 1990s, occurred, with the shoe appearing in a more rugged version, closer to the original concept, as either moccasins, or espadrilles, both of these styles being very low or flat without heels. This resurgence was most noticeable at college campuses across America.

Another variation on the basic style is the tassel loafer, which emerged in the 1950s. Again, though casual, their gradual acceptance among the American East Coast prep school culture as equivalent to brogues (wingtips), has led to them being worn there with suits, where they gained an association with business and legal classes.

=== Types of loafer ===
Style	Year	History	Defining features
Wildsmith	1926	Raymond Lewis Wildsmith was asked to create a country-house shoe. Initially called the 582, it is now widely known as the Wildsmith Loafer.	Serrated seam and reinforced toe box. Vertical stitching on the toe.
Aurland	1930	Shoemaker Nils Gregoriussen Tveranger combined the Native American moccasin with shoes worn by local fishermen in the town of Aurland, Norway. The Aurland Moccasin was born.	Raised seam on upper, similar to a moccasin. Narrow cutout on the saddle.
Penny	1936	G.H. Bass of Wilton, Maine, launched a loafer called the 'Weejun' (from 'Norwegian'). It became very popular in the U.S., especially among prep school students, who, legend has it, kept pennies in the saddle slot for pay phone calls. Hence the name 'penny loafers'.	Leather 'saddle' strap across upper, with a cutout big enough to hold a penny.
Kilted	1950s	Kilties have been fashioned upon brogues and Oxfords by Scottish ghillies, kings, and golfers for over 100 years. The loafer got kilted in the 1950s when Kiltie golf shoes and penny loafers were at their fashion zenith. Also popular with Mods and skinheads.	Kilt style over-the-vamp flap, secured by leather string or tassels.
Horse Bit	1953	Italian designer Aldo Gucci refined the lines, added a gold horse bit, and made them in black. This elevated the loafer to formal wear status. While Aldo Gucci pioneered this design, the horse-bit loafer is produced by a wide variety of shoe makers today.	Horse bit style metal link.
Belgian	1954	Henri Bendel sold his family's shoe store and bought two 300-year-old shoe factories in Belgium. His loafers became an instant hit, and the bow was easily recognizable. His work earned him two knighthoods.	Small bow on top and sewn inside out to create a fine seam.
Tasseled	1957	Brooks Brothers and Alden Shoe Co collaborated to produce the popular tasseled loafer. Originally a bespoke commission by actor Paul Lukas, who liked the tasseled shoelaces on a pair of Oxfords.	Tassels held in place by a leather strand.

=== Use ===
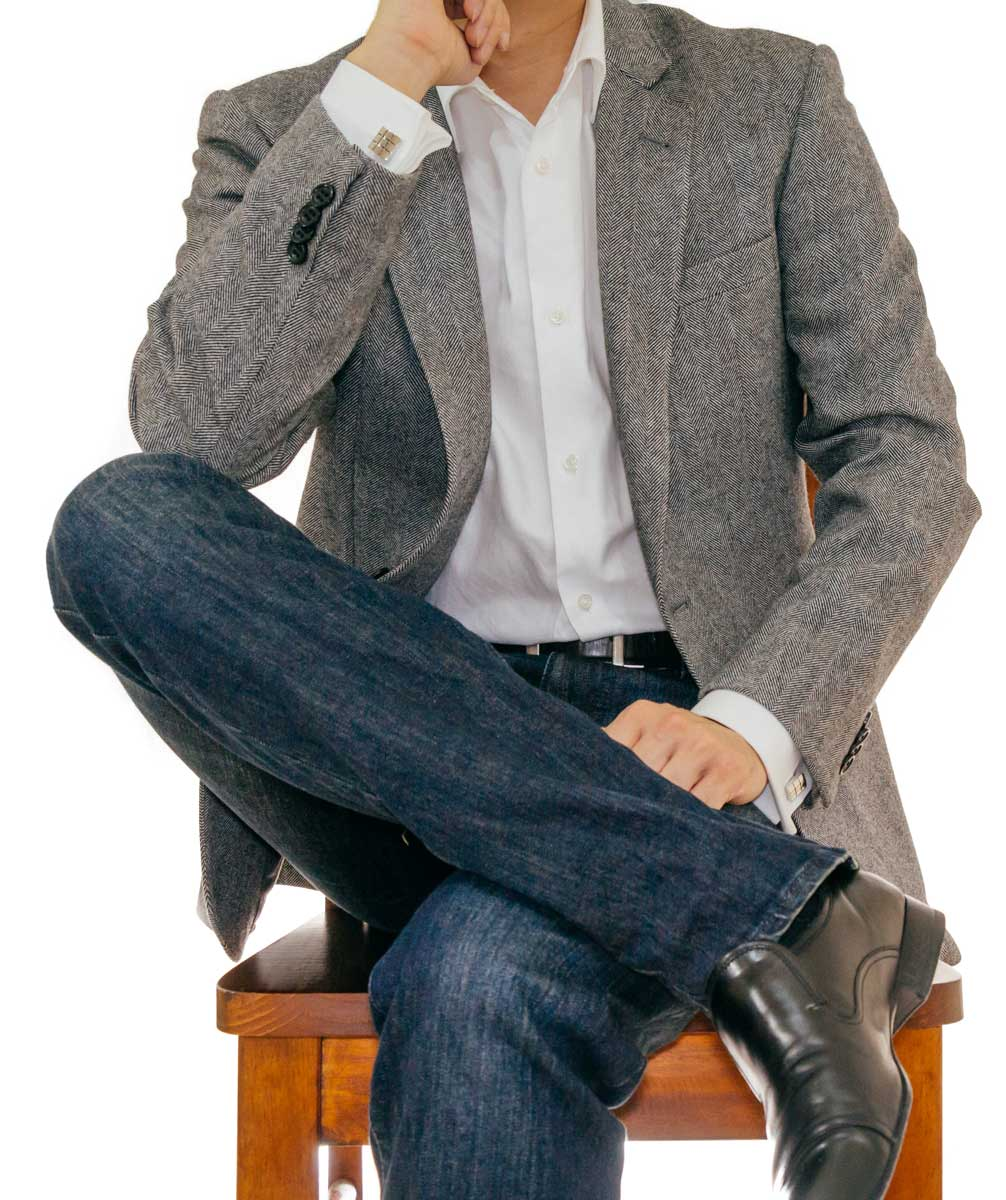
Loafers used in a smart casual dress code.

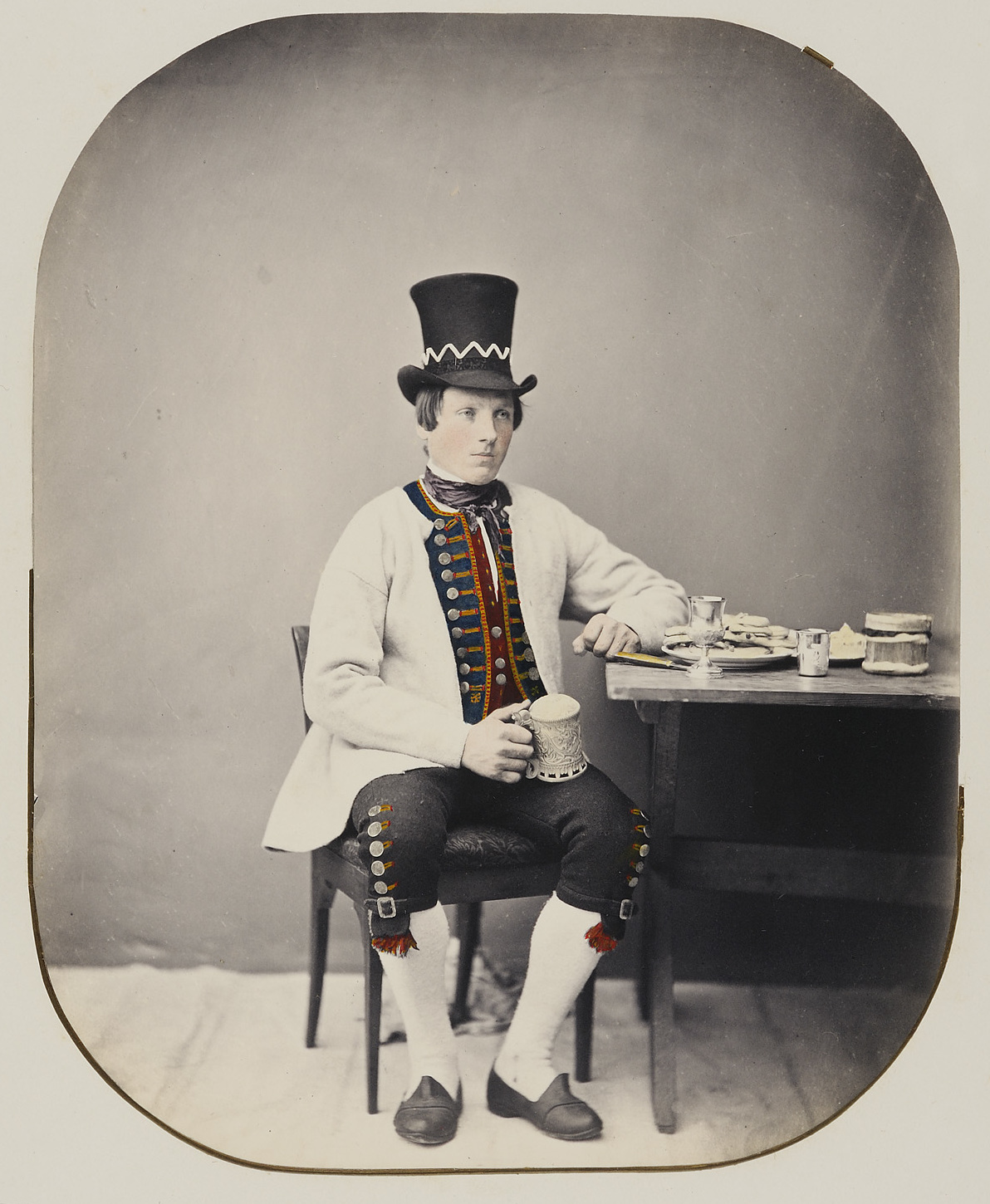
A bridegroom from Bjerkeland near Bergen wearing folk costume and slip-on shoes, photo before 1870. Credit: Marcus Selmer

In the United States and some European countries, such as Italy, the loafer is widely used as a casual, informal shoe for work and leisure, though lace-ups are still preferred for more formal situations. The general popularity of brown over black extends to loafers, sometimes using exotic leathers such as suede and cordovan. Since the early 1980s, socks have been optional while wearing loafers.

Though originally men's shoes, some styles of loafers, such as casual tassel and penny loafers, are also worn by women.

== Gored shoes ==
In an evolution entirely different from that of the loafer, Chelsea boots were invented by J. Sparkes Hall for Queen Victoria in 1836. The stretchable rubber produces a comfortable shoe combining the convenience of laceless shoes with the profile of lace-ups. Its feminine image was soon lost and was dubbed Congress gaiter and Boston boot in America. Rare even in Britain, its country of origin, it is still the only style of slip-on worn with a suit in some of the highly conservative working environments in the City of London. With such a background, their use mimics that of Oxfords, so they are worn in brown with broguing as a country shoe, or in plainer, black styles with suits.

== In popular culture ==
Michael Jackson wore penny loafers during his performances, which became one of his distinctive footwear styles. His moonwalk, toe stand, and other moves were mostly performed in penny loafers.

== See also ==
- Slipper
- Venetian-style shoe
- List of shoe styles
