= Joseph Leavitt =

American pioneer (1757–1839)

- Born: April 28, 1757; Pembroke, Massachusetts, British America
- Died: March 15, 1839 (aged 81); Turner, Maine, U.S.
- Other name: Quaker Joe
- Occupations: Pioneer; inkeeper; settler
- Spouses: Anna Stevens (m. 1776; died 1794) Hannah Chandler (m. 1795; died 1796) Elsea Casaell (m. 1796; died 1835)
- Children: 10

Private Joseph Leavitt (April 28, 1757 – March 15, 1839), also known as Quaker Joe, was an early settler of Maine, who moved to what was then the frontier of Massachusetts after serving three months in the Continental Army at the outbreak of the Revolutionary War, and then declaring that he was unable to bear arms in conflict.

The conscientious objector declared that he would move to Maine and survey lands for grants to former soldiers. On account of his pacifist sentiments, Leavitt was awarded with a house lot next to the new Turner meetinghouse when it was eventually built.

== Early life in Massachusetts ==
Joseph Leavitt was born in 1757 in Pembroke, Plymouth County, Massachusetts, the son of Jacob Leavitt and his wife Sylvia (Bonney) Leavitt. The family originated at Hingham, some 17 miles away, in the seventeenth century when English settler deacon John Leavitt removed there from Boston. Joseph Leavitt, great-great-grandson of patriarch John, was the son of a modest farmer in Pembroke.

At the outbreak of hostilities in the American Revolutionary War in 1775, Joseph Leavitt enlisted as Private in the Continental Army for an initial three-month period of service. Leavitt was involved in some of the earliest skirmishes of the War, when he helped fight British forces during the Siege of Boston in 1775. At the conclusion of his service in the earliest phase of the Revolutionary War, Leavitt declared himself unable to fight any longer. "Some must stay at home and raise bread," Leavitt was recorded as saying. While others did the fighting, Leavitt said he would instead "raise bread for them."

== A new life in the woods ==
Shortly afterwards, Leavitt decamped for the new township of Sylvester in what was still the state of Massachusetts. He accompanied the surveyors paid by the government to lay out new townships along the Androscoggin River. As an assistant to the surveyors, Leavitt noted the topography, and told the surveyors that after returning to his Massachusetts home, he would be back to settle permanently at the place that later became the new township of Turner. The surveyors, noting Leavitt's pacifist tendencies, told him half-jokingly, "Well, Joe, you will like to go to meeting, so we will give you a lot next to the meeting-house lot."

The next year, the young surveyors' assistant Leavitt returned alone from Massachusetts to the place he had chosen. Leavitt carried his scant provisions with him on his back. The closest non-Native inhabitant was 20 miles distant. Leavitt's relations with the native Algonquian tribe were apparently warm. That spring and summer Leavitt wielded an axe to cut a clearing, on which he built a blockhouse, the first house in the new township of Turner.

In the fall Leavitt returned to Pembroke, the home of most settlers of Turner. The following year, and after the heavy Maine winter, Leavitt returned to his blockhouse in the wilderness and planted a crop. Shortly afterwards he journeyed by foot to New Gloucester, Maine, where he purchased 19 apple tree seedlings. Carrying them on his shoulders, Leavitt returned to his outpost in the Maine woods, where he planted his orchard.

Later that same year Leavitt left his meager belongings in the care of Algonquins and returned again to Pembroke, where he married Anna Stevens. On the return trip to his new lands, Leavitt's new wife Anna rode behind him on his horse, with her belongings and portmanteaux stuffed into saddlebags on accompanying pack horses, a journey that took several weeks through the province of Massachusetts, as Maine was then known.

== Later years and Maine legacy ==
Leavitt and his wife continued to live in Turner, as the new town became known. Eventually the former soldier and pacifist opened a public house, and he was chosen to represent the town in local and state councils. Leavitt's first wife Anna (Stevens) bore eight children, the oldest of whom was the first male child born in the new township of Turner. Leavitt subsequently married twice; to Hannah Chandler, with whom he had another two children; and as his third wife Elsea Caswell, with whom he had no children.

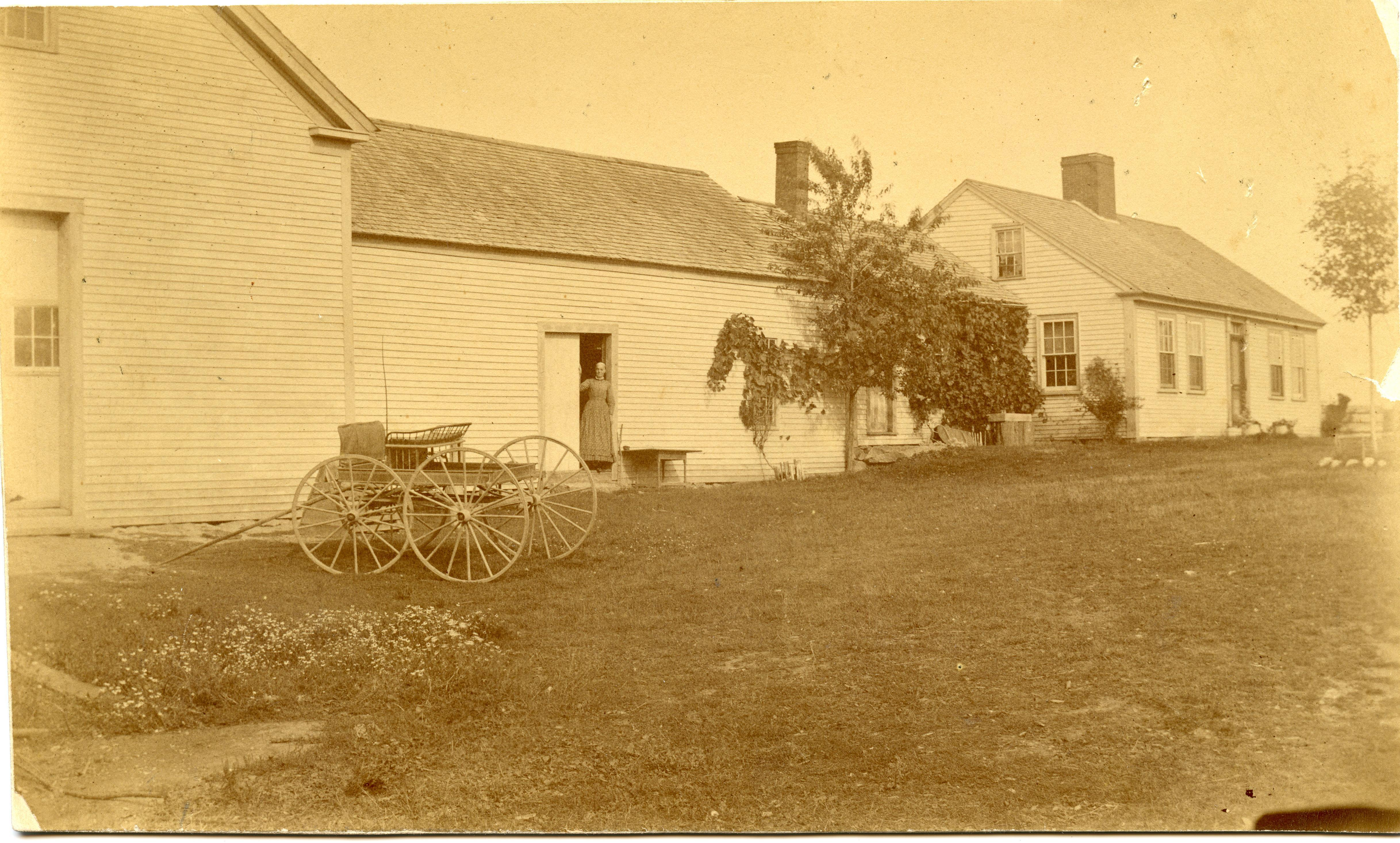
Leavitt farm, Turner, ca. 1900

Ultimately Joseph Leavitt's father Jacob departed Pembroke, Massachusetts, and joined his son at his new Maine lodgings. Father Jacob died in 1814 at age 82; his wife Sylvia (Bonney) Leavitt died in 1810. Frontiersman and former pacifist Joseph Leavitt, known by the cognomen 'Quaker Joe' for the rest of his life, died at age 83 in 1839. He is buried in Turner's Upper Street Cemetery, near his original house lot. Noted on his gravestone is his service, albeit brief, as a private in the American Revolutionary cause. Lying nearby is his father Jacob, whose own service as a Minuteman in the Continental Army is noted on his tombstone.

== See also ==
- John Leavitt
- Elisha Leavitt
- L. Brooks Leavitt
- Pembroke, Massachusetts
- Wilton, Maine
- Turner, Maine
