= Diffusion line =

Lower price line from a high-end brand

A diffusion line (also known as a bridge line) is a secondary line of merchandise created by a high-end fashion house or fashion designer that retails at lower prices. These ranges are separate from a fashion house's "signature line", or principal artistic line, that typically retails at much higher prices. Diffusion products may be on sale alongside designers' signature lines but they can also be made available at concession outlets and certain chain stores. The use of a diffusion line is a part of the strategy of massification where luxury brands attempt to reach a broader market in order to increase revenue and brand recognition.

Diffusion lines serve several purposes for designers. They can substantially increase sales volumes as their products become more affordable to a wider audience at the lower price point, with the designer at the same time leveraging the desirability of their premium ranges to create a kind of halo effect. They can also be a response to offset the effect of chain stores copying their products and undercutting the designer's prices.

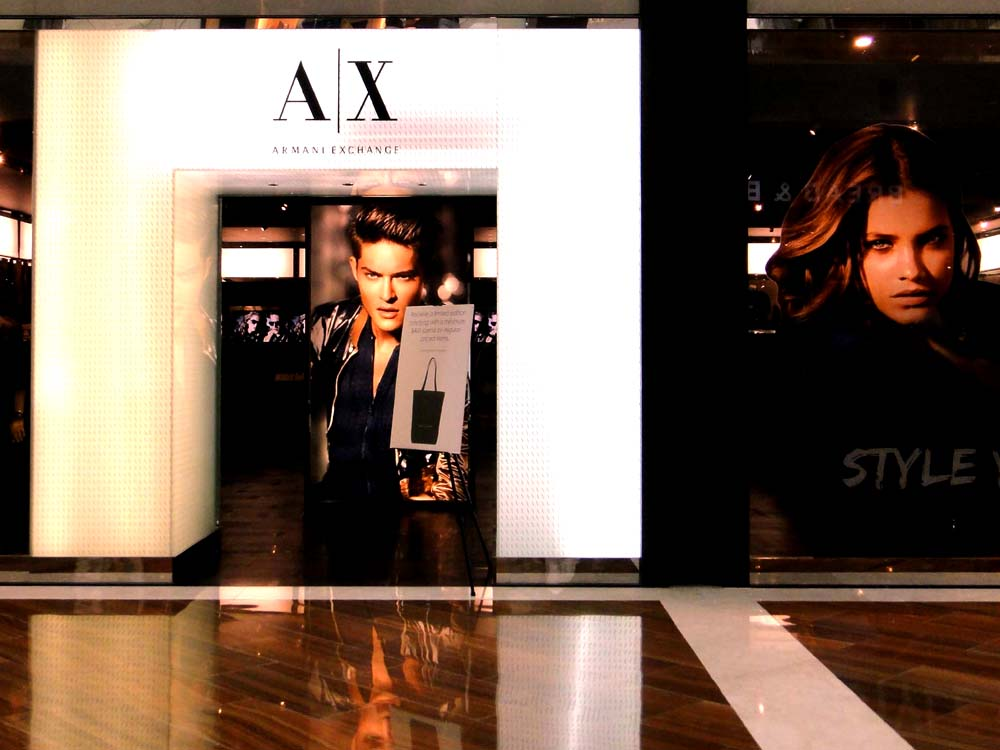
Armani Exchange in Singapore

== Diffusion lines ==
Diffusion line	Brand	Notes	Reference(s)
10 Crosby	Derek Lam		
AAPE by A Bathing Ape	A Bathing Ape		
Armani Exchange, Armani Jeans, Emporio Armani	Armani		
BDL	Ben de Lisi	For Debenhams	
Cheap & Chic, Love Moschino, Moschino Jeans	Moschino		
CK, CK Jeans, Calvin Klein Underwear	Calvin Klein		
CDG, Comme des Garçons Homme, Comme des Garçons PLAY, Comme des Garçons BLACK, Comme des Garçons Girl, Comme des Garçons SHIRT, Comme des Garçons WALLET	Comme des Garçons		
D&G	Dolce & Gabbana	Closed 2011	
DKNY	Donna Karan		
DRKSHDW, Rick Owens Lillies	Rick Owens		
Farhi	Nicole Farhi		
Fendissime, Fendi 365, Fendi Country, Fendi Jeans, Fendi Maglia	Fendi		
Giamba	Giambattista Valli		
Halston III, H Halston	Halston		
Hugo	Boss		
ICE, ICE JEANS, SPORT ICE	Iceberg		
Pleats Please, Homme Plisse, ME issey miyake	Issey Miyake	Pleats Please launched 1993, ME issey miyake launched 2001, Homme Plisse launched 2013	
Junior Gaultier, Soleil, JPG Jeans, Maille Femme, Gaultier Puissance 2	Jean Paul Gaultier	Junior Gaultier launched 1988, JPG Jeans launched 1992, Gaultier Puissance 2 launched 2006	
Just Cavalli, Cavalli Class, Roberto Cavalli Sport	Roberto Cavalli		
Karl Lagerfeld Paris	Karl Lagerfeld		
Kate Spade Saturday	Kate Spade	Closed 2015	
Lacoste Live!	Lacoste		
L'Agent	Agent Provocateur		
Marc New York	Andrew Marc		
Marc by Marc Jacobs, The Marc Jacobs, Heaven	Marc Jacobs	Marc by Marc Jacobs closed 2015, The Marc Jacobs launched 2019, Heaven launched 2020	
Max&Co, SportMax, 'S Max Mara	Max Mara		
McQ	Alexander McQueen	"suspended" 2022	
MICHAEL by Michael Kors	Michael Kors		
Mimi Holliday	Damaris		
M Missoni, Missoni Mare	Missoni		
Miss Wu	Jason Wu		
MM6	Maison Margiela		
Thierry Mugler Active, Mugler Trademark, Mugler, Only Thierry Mugler, Thierry Mugler Edition	Thierry Mugler	Thierry Mugler replaced by Mugler in 1994, Only Thierry Mugler registered in 2001, Thierry Mugler Edition launched 2008	
MW	Matthew Williamson	For Macy's	
Notte	Marchesa		
Overture	Judith Leiber		
Pierre Balmain	Balmain		
Philipp Plein Fetish	Philipp Plein		
Richard Chai Love	Richard Chai		
See	Chloé		
Simply Vera	Vera Wang	For Kohl's and Harris Scarfe	
Sonia	Sonia Rykiel		
T	Alexander Wang		
Tommy Jeans	Tommy Hilfiger		
R.E.D. Valentino, Valentino Garavani	Valentino	R.E.D. Valentino closed 2024	
Versus, Versace Jeans Couture, Versace Collection, Versace Classic V2, V2	Versace		
Victoria	Victoria Beckham		
Wannabe	Patrick Cox		
Y-3, Y's, S'YTE, Ground Y	Yohji Yamamoto	Y-3 for Adidas	
Z Zegna	Ermenegildo Zegna		
Z Spoke, Zac Zac Posen	Zac Posen	Z Spoke for Saks	
