= Andrew Marc =

American company

- Company type: Subsidiary of G-III Apparel Group
- Traded as: Nasdaq: GIII; S&P 600 Component
- Industry: Consumer Goods
- Founded: 1982
- Headquarters: Times Square, New York City, United States
- Key people: Morris Goldfarb, CEO; Stephen Budd, President; Chris Gbur, In-House Creative Director
- Products: Textile - apparel clothing
- Parent: G-III Apparel Group
- Website: www.andrewmarc.com

Andrew Marc is an American luxury fashion brand. The company originated as a leather goods label established in 1982. The company is headquartered just south of Times Square in Midtown Manhattan, New York City.

== Management history ==
The brand was founded in 1982. In November 2004, GB Merchant Partners partnered with the company's founders as part of a leveraged recapitalization. In February 2008, the brand was acquired by G-III Apparel Group, Ltd. (NASDAQ: GIII).

== Merchandising ==
Andrew Marc is a luxury apparel line focused primarily on men's and women's outerwear. The brand uses innovations in leather treatments including waxes, distressing, pigmentation, oxidation and organic dying processes.

It also operates the diffusion line Marc New York.

== Dog fur controversy ==
In 2007, The Humane Society of the United States reported that some Andrew Marc coats labelled as having fake fur were in fact trimmed with fur from Chinese domestic dogs.

In 2008, the Humane Society filed a lawsuit claiming that Andrew Marc labeled real fur as fake fur, or labeled raccoon dog fur as common raccoon, fox or rabbit fur.

In 2009, through a court settlement with the Humane Society, Andrew Marc agreed to phase out raccoon dog fur usage by 2013 and improve its garment labeling practices.

In 2015, having failed to phase out raccoon dog fur usage by 2013, Andrew Marc settled a civil contempt lawsuit with the Humane Society. Andrew Marc was required to certify that it will never again sell raccoon dog fur, and to pay $25,000 to the Humane Society.
