= L. Brooks Leavitt =

American historian

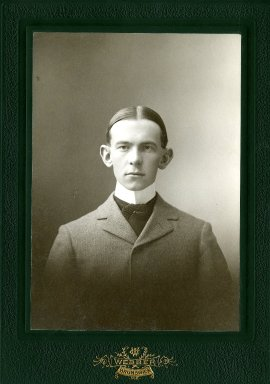
L. Brooks Leavitt, Bowdoin College, Class of 1899

Leon Brooks Leavitt (April 3, 1878 – October 13, 1941) was an investment banker and antiquarian book collector who served as an overseer of Bowdoin College, to whose library he donated part of his collection of rare books and manuscripts. Born in Wilton, Maine, to a father who was a stagecoach driver who died when Leavitt was young, Brooks Leavitt was an aesthete turned banker whom Maine's poet laureate later eulogized at his funeral.

== Biography ==
Leon Brooks Leavitt was born to William Newcomb Leavitt and Ada Idela (Russell) Leavitt in Wilton, Maine, on April 3, 1878. Leavitt's father dropped dead of a heart attack when Brooks Leavitt was attending Wilton Academy. Leavitt subsequently attended Bowdoin College in Brunswick, Maine, where he became a voracious reader, and to which he later helped send his younger brother Russell by paying his tuition.

On graduating, Leavitt worked briefly as the principal of a Farmington, Maine high school, and then went to work for the United States Census Bureau. Leavitt subsequently attended George Washington University Law School in Washington, D.C., and practiced law briefly in New York City, before joining the Wall Street investment banking firm of Bertram, Griscom & Company.

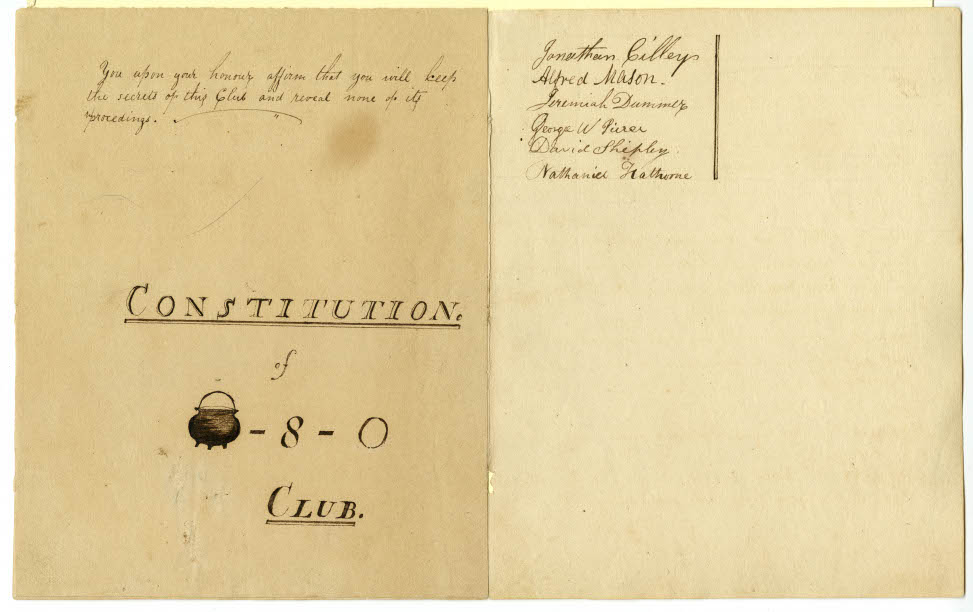
Constitution of the Pot-8-0 Club, secret society formed by Bowdoin undergraduate Nathaniel Hawthorne and five others, circa 1824. Gift to Bowdoin College Library by alumnus L. Brooks Leavitt

Within a few years, Leavitt joined the investment banking firm of Paine, Webber & Co., where he worked at the firm's headquarters on Wall Street in Manhattan. Leavitt became a bond specialist, and was later one of the partners in charge of the company. While working at Paine Webber, Leavitt indulged his true loves – literature, oriental carpets and the companionship of artists and writers of the day. Having eventually made a fortune on Wall Street, Leavitt retired back to his beloved Maine.

One of Leavitt's lifelong friends was Robert P. T. Coffin, a fellow Mainer, Bowdoin graduate and Bowdoin professor. Coffin dedicated his novel Captain Abbey and Captain John to his friend Leavitt, "a fellow son of Maine." Following Leavitt's death from heart disease on October 13, 1941, Coffin eulogized him in his poem "Brooks Leavitt", read at Leavitt's 1941 funeral in Wilton. A longtime patron of the arts, Brooks Leavitt was close to many New York artists and actors, including Francis Wilson, the foremost Broadway stage actor of his day. Among other of Leavitt's lifelong friends was the American explorer Donald Baxter MacMillan, with whom Leavitt regularly corresponded.

Among the manuscripts owned and collected by Leavitt, who turned to book collecting after the Wall Street crash of 1929, was an original Shakespeare First Folio, as well as the original manuscript of D. H. Lawrence's Sons and Lovers, written in Lawrence's own hand.

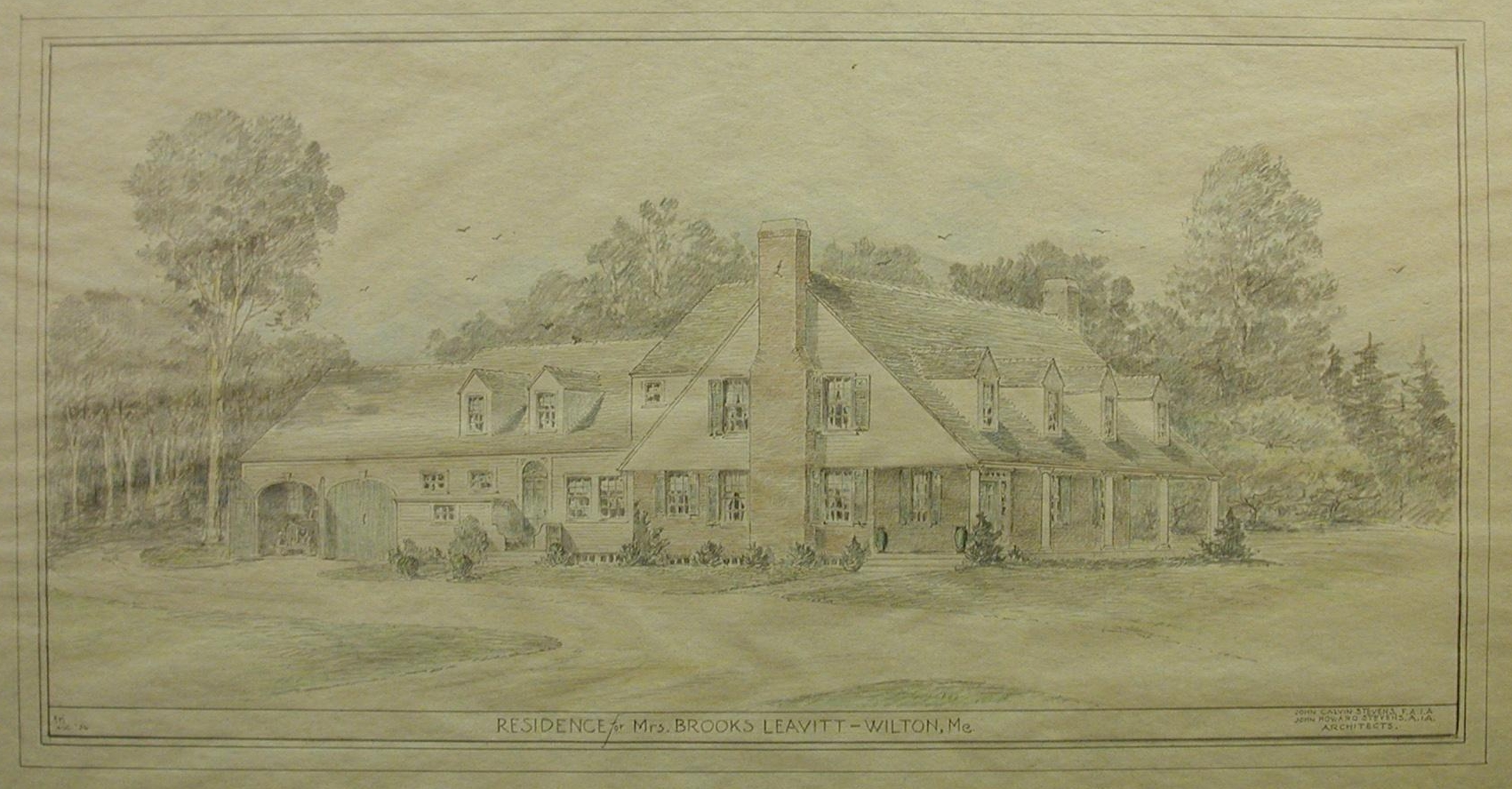
Brooks Leavitt home, architect John Calvin Stevens, Wilton, ca. 1925

Leavitt was married to the former Elizabeth Burns Purman, who was born in Washington, D.C., the daughter of Dr. James Jackson Purman and Mary Witherow Purman of Washington, D.C. Dr Purman was the recipient of the Congressional Medal of Honor for gallantry in the battle of Gettysburg. Brooks Leavitt and his wife lived in Manhattan and at their second home in Leavitt's birthplace of Wilton, Maine, where the couple's home was designed by the Maine architect John Calvin Stevens. The couple had no children. Brooks Leavitt served as an overseer of Bowdoin College, and subsequently donated manuscripts to the Bowdoin Library by alumni Nathaniel Hawthorne, Franklin Pierce, and Henry Wadsworth Longfellow.

== See also ==
- Joseph Leavitt
