= East Wilton, Maine =

- Village
- Location within Maine
- Coordinates: 44°36′57″N 70°11′34″W
- Country: United States
- State: Maine
- County: Franklin
- Elevation: 404 ft (123 m)
- Time zone: UTC-5 (Eastern (EST))
  - Summer (DST): UTC-4 (EDT)
- ZIP code: 04234
- Area code: 207
- GNIS feature ID: 565701

East Wilton is an unincorporated village in the town of Wilton, Franklin County, Maine, United States. The community is located along U.S. Route 2, 4.3 miles (6.9 km) south-southwest of Farmington. East Wilton has a post office, with ZIP code 04234, which opened on February 29, 1828.
