= Massification =

Strategy used by luxury brands to gain wider appeal

Massification is a strategy used by some luxury companies to expose their brands to a broader market and increase sales. One common method of massification is the creation of diffusion lines—offshoots of a company's or designer's original line that are less expensive, allowing a brand to reach a wider consumer base. Another approach is brand extensions, in which an established company releases new products under the same brand name to appeal to a broader audience.

== Diffusion lines ==
Some luxury designers and companies will create a diffusion line to reach a broader consumer audience. A diffusion line is when a designer will create another separate line of merchandise up for consumption at a lesser price. Diffusion lines have varying ranges and purposes; to increase sales, to broaden range of consumers, and to increase demand for product.

Diffusion lines have four stages of market development: wholesale channels to department stores; the creation of ready-to-wear flagships; large diffusion flagships; the opening of stores in provincial cities. An expansion of this level requires a company to obtain more capital, because of this over 60 per cent of all fashion designers are now public limited companies. Diffusion line development, stages 3 and 4, are often franchised to third parties with the designer having control over the product and its brand image. Between 20–30 per cent of gross margin is spent on advertising support to create global campaigns to enhance brand image in foreign markets. Companies have to deal with the tension between the desire to be exclusive and the desire to produce product line extensions and widespread distribution which could lead to the dilution the brand's value.

Glamour publisher Bill Wackerman attributes the growth in the luxury market to a phenomenon called "mass-tige," a play off the word "prestige". Wackerman uses Isaac Mizrahi selling his designs at Bergdorf Goodman as well as Target, and Karl Lagerfeld's apparel at Chanel and low-priced retailer H&M, as evidence that the phenomenon is taking place.

=== Brand extensions ===
Many luxury brands maintain their reputation through brand extension. A brand extension is the use of an established brand name to introduce a new product or service. Luxury brands use this strategy in order to reach a larger audience that may not be exposed to these luxury brands.

Consequences of brand extension activity while a company is doing poorly is seen as a trading down. The company will face difficulty because their luxury status was already becoming fragile. Dropping their prices and expanding will dilute their status with consumers.

== Value of luxury ==
Psychological benefits are considered to be the main factor that distinguishes luxury products from nonluxury products.

The definition of luxury is something that is constantly changing. Originally, luxury was a visible result: purposely flashy and showy, defining hereditary social stratification

Currently Millennials are creating an upheaval, this group looks for quality, craftsmanship and authenticity, it is about where the product was made and the products it was made with, not brand names. Millennials are targeted for a category called "functional luxury", which are brands that provide products that feel less frivolous than fashion, even though they are still pricey. Apple, Whole Foods and Sleep Number mattresses are considered functional luxury brands. One tactic to reach millennials is personalization, in which shoppers receive tailored promotions and see a uniquely crafted version of a retailer's Web site. Millennials are also targeted as a part of the category called "HENRY"—an acronym for a person who is a "high-earner not rich yet."

New words have been invented and promoted for the new definitions of luxury: masstige, opuluxe, premium, ultra-premium, trading up, hyperluxury, and real or true luxury. There is confusion about what really makes a luxury product in today's society

Today luxury brands face an economic crisis. The middle class buyers are disappearing, as well as many wealthy consumers. Even wealthy people who have not been personally affected by the crisis are changing their purchasing habits. They are reducing their consumption, even though they still have the means to buy luxury products and brands as a way of symbolically participating in the national struggle and exhibiting solidarity.

== Experiential marketing ==
Experiential marketing or engagement marketing is a strategy with a core concept that the consumer should be involved and engaged in the product and company instead of being a passive bystander. It promotes consumers to be involved in the growth and evolution of the brand.

The shift towards using experiential strategies is a rapidly growing global trend. "Experiential marketing is thus about taking the essence of a product and amplifying it into a set of tangible, physical and interactive experiences that reinforce the offer."

There are four "experiential zones": Entertainment, Education, Escapist and Aesthetic.

- Experiences under the entertainment sector are centered around a low customer involvement and interaction. Examples are upscale boutiques, and high end brands opening up restaurants in their stores.
- Experiences under the education sector require more involvement, but still have a low level of intensity. This zone offers a way for the customer to acquire a new skill, or improve an already established skill. The concept referred to as 'edutainment' relates to this experiential zone.
- Experiences under the escapist sector demand both a high involvement and high intensity. Examples of this are evident in the hospitality sector and in private clubs. These experiences allow for consumers to "escape" life or even create new identities.
- Experiences under the aesthetic sector involves a high degree of intensity, but does not require a lot of involvement, such as viewing an art exhibit.

=== Experiential strategies ===
Academics have come up with their own strategies for experiential marketing.

Smith has come up with a six-step process; One of the first steps is to conduct a survey to see how consumers already view the brand. Then you need to create a brand platform and design a brand experience. Lastly you need to advertise the brand and monitor the performance of the brand.

Lippincott Mercer has come up with four principles of experience design. The beginning step is to identify key customer data and feedback. The next step is to figure out your target audience and figure out what will have the greatest impact on consumers. The third step is to turn the findings into project priorities. The final step is to apply the strategy and monitor the purchases.

The management consultancy, A.T. Kearney developed a 7Cs model to create a high impact digital customer experience –content, customization, customer care, communication, community, connectivity and convenience.

Nueno and Quelch (1998) came to the conclusion that: design and communications, product line, customer service and channel management are the four keys of managing luxury brands successfully.

Kellar (2009) highlights the importance that luxury brands should appeal to the brand feelings that are associated with a customer's emotional response and reactions towards the brand in their marketing strategy. The brand feelings are classified into six types. The first three types of brand feelings are experiential and immediate: (a)'warmth' feeling (b)'fun' feeling (c)'excitement' feeling. The next three types of brand feelings are private and enduring (d)'security' feeling (e)'social approval' feeling (f)'self-respect' feeling.

Keller (2009) outlined ten characteristics of luxury brands for how to market them. This includes: maintaining a premium image, ensuring product quality and service, ensuring that pleasure purchase and consumption experiences are present, carefully control distribution channels, employ a premium pricing strategy, manage brand architecture, do not compete with ordinary brands, and have legal protection for all their trademarks.

=== Celebrity brand endorsement ===
Brand personality or celebrity endorsement is considered as an effective form of advertising (Aaker, 1996).

A trend in luxury fashion advertising is the rise of the celebrity model. Last year, Jennifer Lopez appeared in Louis Vuitton ads; Cate Blanchett in Donna Karan; Adrien Brody in Ermenegildo Zegna; Winona Ryder in Marc Jacobs. This season CK Lingerie ads feature Hilary Swank.

Celebrity, and in particular athlete, endorsements are profitable; although there are companies outside the sports apparel industry that are active in celebrity endorsements as well. It has been found that the use of celebrity endorsers as an advertising strategy generally has a positive pay-off in brand-level sales and increases the company's stock returns.

== Consequences ==
=== Brand violation ===
A violation of fairness creates a sense of betrayal among customers, which in turn pressures customers to restore fairness through two actions: demanding reparation and retaliating.

Reparation is a positive mechanism for restoring fairness and refers to anything a company provides to customers in order to compensate them for the failure (cf., Walster 1973). Reparation includes: exchange or repair a defective product, offer a discount or reimbursement, apologize, or respond in a timely fashion (Bowen 1999; Smith 1999).

Retaliatory behaviors are efforts made by customers to punish and cause inconvenience to a company for the damages it caused. Retaliation is motivated by a desire to "bring down" a company in some way (Walster 1973). Retaliatory behaviors refers to the three following behaviors: vindictive complaining, spreading negative word-of-mouth, or by contacting a third-party organization to publicize the company's failure.

=== Brand disengagement ===
Consumers place loyalty and make purchases based on rational and emotional factors. Brand disengagement can occur when a consumer feels that a brand or product has wronged them; this is called a "love becomes hate" effect. Because of this effect the consumer may spread around a negative image about the company to other people.
