= Walker Woolen Mill =

Coordinates: 44.5901°N 70.2211°W

The Walker Woolen Mill, also known as the Foster Mill, was built in Wilton, Maine, in 1840. It was expanded and refurbished over the next 40–50 years using local local pine and wood eventually shipped using the transcontinental railroad.

Maine is the most wooded state in the United States, and has a long history of manufacturing everything from shoes to paper. Charles Forster, a later owner who has been called the "father of the toothpick" used the mill to produce the world's first toothpick in 1881. It later housed a supplier of fabric to the automotive industry and a factory producing plastic cutlery. In 2015, the Town of Wilton acquired it through foreclosure.

By 2019 the mill had undergone the final stages of demolition.
