= Dryden, Maine =

- Village
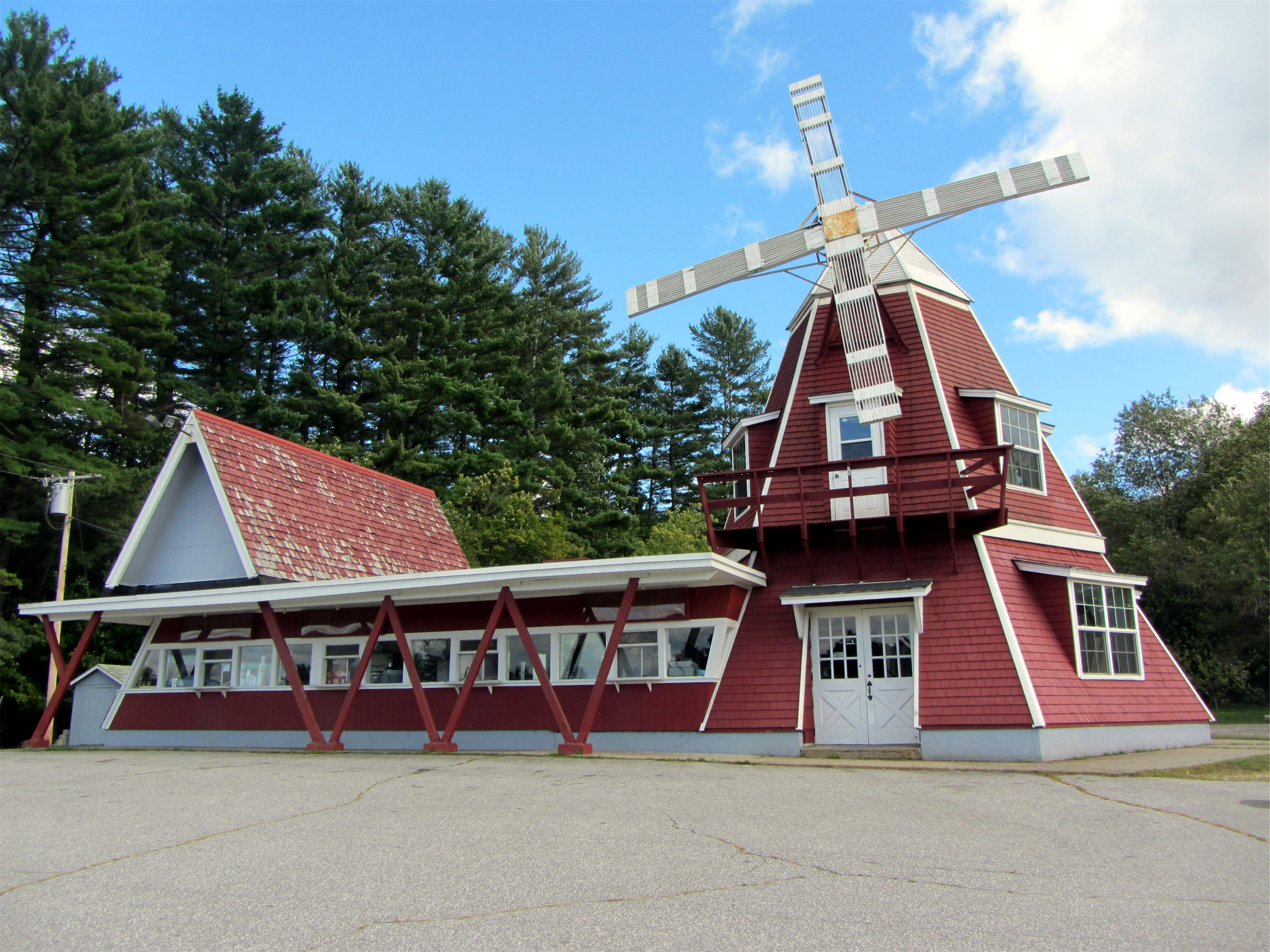
- Building in Dryden

- Location within Maine
- Coordinates: 44°35′12″N 70°12′35″W
- Country: United States
- State: Maine
- County: Franklin
- Elevation: 479 ft (146 m)
- Time zone: UTC-5 (Eastern (EST))
  - Summer (DST): UTC-4 (EDT)
- ZIP code: 04225
- Area code: 207
- GNIS feature ID: 565324

Dryden is an unincorporated village in the town of Wilton, Franklin County, Maine, United States. The community is located along U.S. Route 2, Maine State Route 4, and Maine State Route 156, 6.5 miles (10.5 km) south-southwest of Farmington. Dryden has a post office, with ZIP code 04225, which opened on January 30, 1899.
