= Wilton, Maine =

- Town
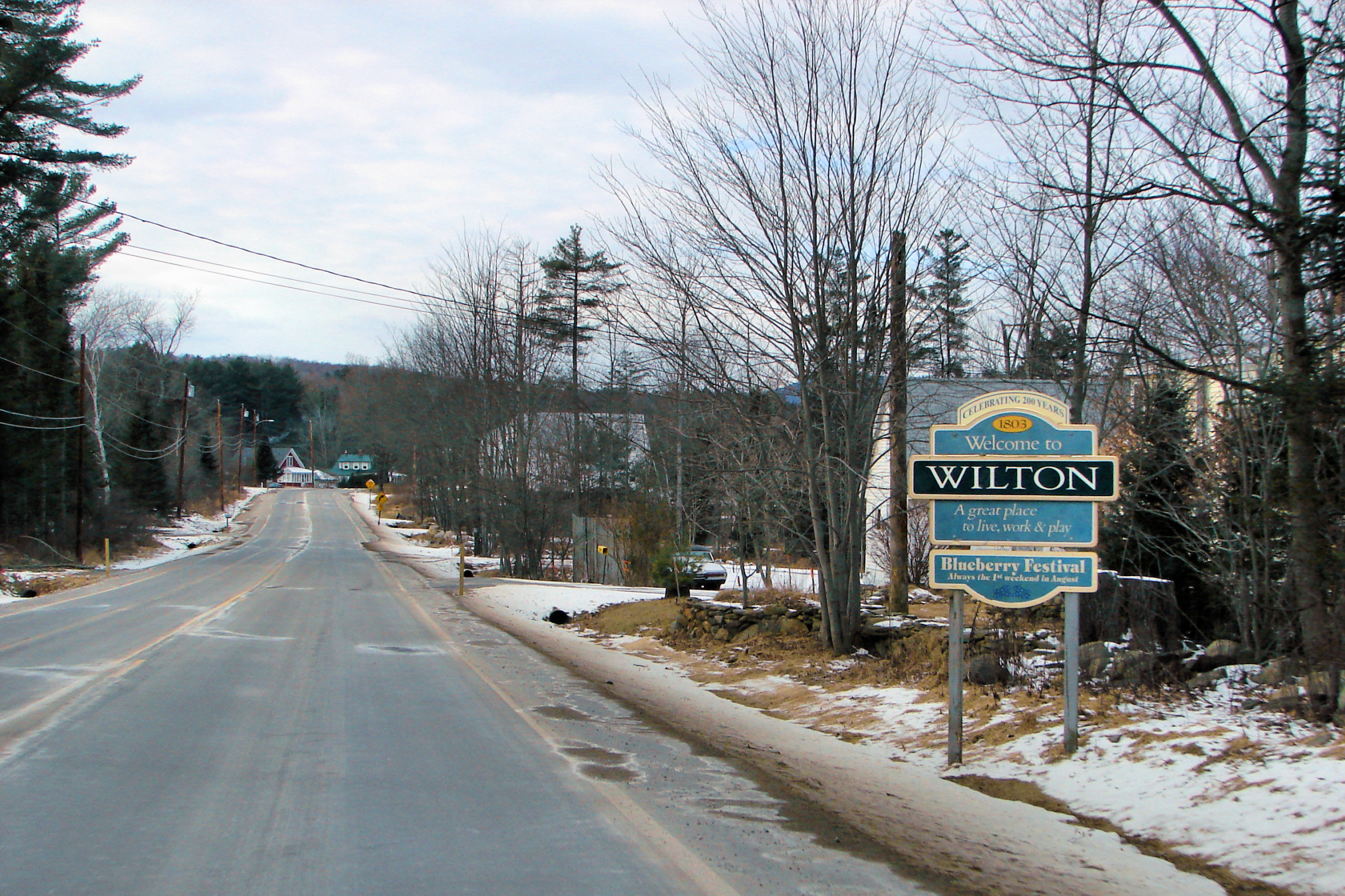
- Entering Wilton

- Seal
- Motto: A great place to live, work & play
- Location within Maine Location within the United States
- Coordinates: 44°37′05″N 70°15′37″W
- Country: United States
- State: Maine
- County: Franklin
- Incorporated: 1803
- Villages: Wilton; Dryden; East Dixfield (part); East Wilton; Wilton Intervale

Area
  - Total: 42.82 sq mi (110.90 km^{2})
  - Land: 41.26 sq mi (106.86 km^{2})
  - Water: 1.56 sq mi (4.04 km^{2})
- Elevation: 633 ft (193 m)

Population (2020)
  - Total: 3,835
  - Density: 93/sq mi (35.9/km^{2})
- Time zone: UTC-5 (Eastern (EST))
  - Summer (DST): UTC-4 (EDT)
- ZIP Codes: 04294 (Wilton); 04234 (East Wilton); 04225 (Dryden)
- Area code: 207
- GNIS feature ID: 582816
- Website: www.wiltonmaine.gov

Wilton is a town in Franklin County, Maine, United States. The population was 3,835 at the 2020 census. Situated beside Wilson Pond, the former mill town is today primarily a recreation area.

== History ==
The land replaced an invalidated 1727 grant by Massachusetts to veterans for service in the French and Indian Wars. The first grant (now part of Manchester, New Hampshire) was originally dubbed Harrytown after a particularly dangerous Native American, then renamed Tyngstown for Captain William Tyng, leader of the expedition of "snowshoe men" that killed him in 1703. Abraham Butterfield, a settler from Wilton, New Hampshire, paid the cost of incorporation in 1803 to have the new town named after his former residence.

Wilton is known for being the location of Maine's first cotton mill, started in 1810 by Solomon Adams. In 1876, George Henry Bass (1855–1925) founded G.H. Bass & Co. and became the best-known businessman in Wilton's history. Bass shoes (including those worn by Charles Lindbergh during his Atlantic crossing and Admiral Byrd in his expeditions to Antarctica) were made exclusively in Wilton for more than a century until 1998. By then the Bass family had sold out, and in 1998 Bass' parent company, Phillips-Van Heusen, moved operations overseas.

John Russell Bass (b. 1878), son of G. H. Bass, was treasurer for the firm and served as Maine delegate to the Republican national convention in 1920, 1944 and 1952. The company built much of its success on the Bass penny weejun, introduced in 1936 and said to be based on Norwegian fisherman's shoes. The style was an instant hit, and became a staple on college campuses across the nation. The shoe was later renamed the Leavitt penny weejun; it is no longer made in Wilton.

The first toothpick manufacturing mill was also located in Wilton. The Walker Woolen Mill was built in 1840, and owner Charles Forster used the building as a toothpick mill from 1881

Maine architect John Calvin Stevens designed the L. Brooks Leavitt home in Wilton. Stevens was the architect of many well-known Maine residences, including Winslow Homer's in Prouts Neck, Maine. An early Wall Street investment banker and rare book collector, Brooks Leavitt was an overseer and financial supporter of Bowdoin College and its library, and a relation of the Bass family. Esteemed Maine author Robert P.T. Coffin dedicated his book Captain Abby and Captain John to lifelong friend Leavitt, "a fellow son of Maine," whom Coffin eulogized in his poem "Brooks Leavitt," read at Leavitt's 1948 funeral in Wilton. A longtime patron of the arts, Brooks Leavitt was close to many New York artists and actors, including Francis Wilson, the foremost Broadway stage actor of his day.

Other historic buildings in Wilton include the Goodspeed Memorial Library and the Bass Boarding House, both of which are listed on the National Register of Historic Places.

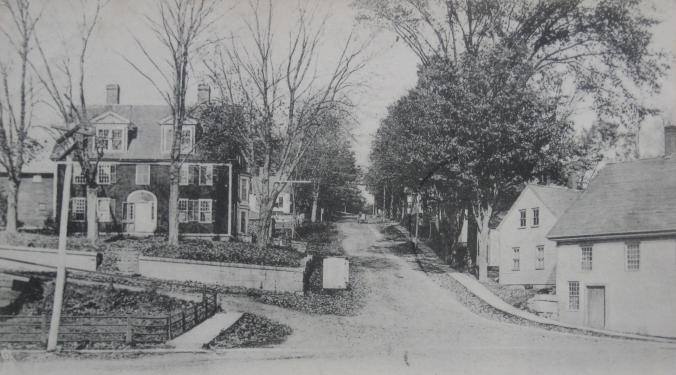
High Street in 1905

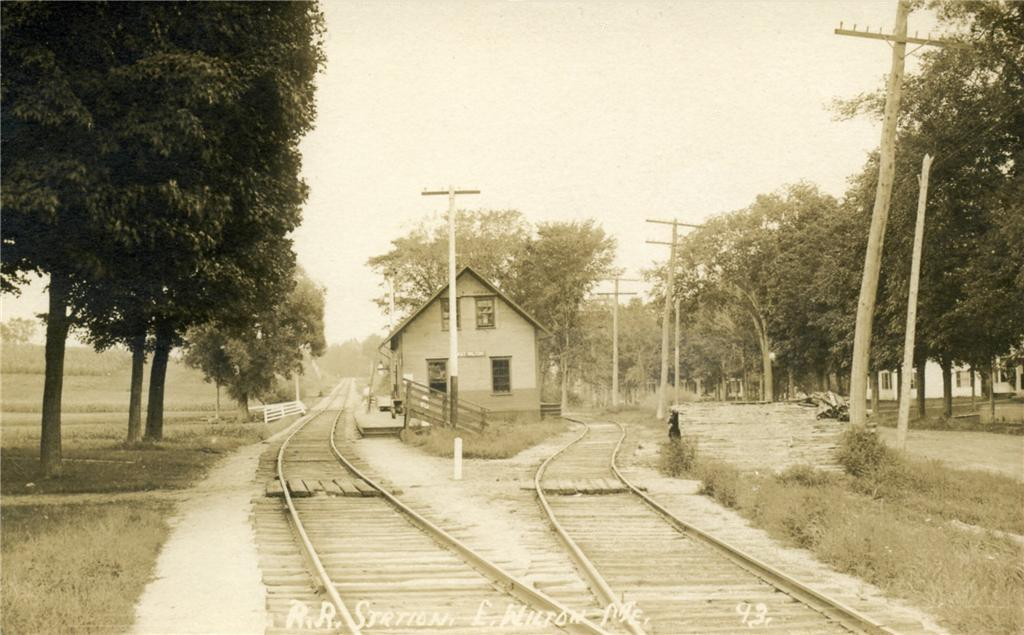
East Wilton depot in 1919

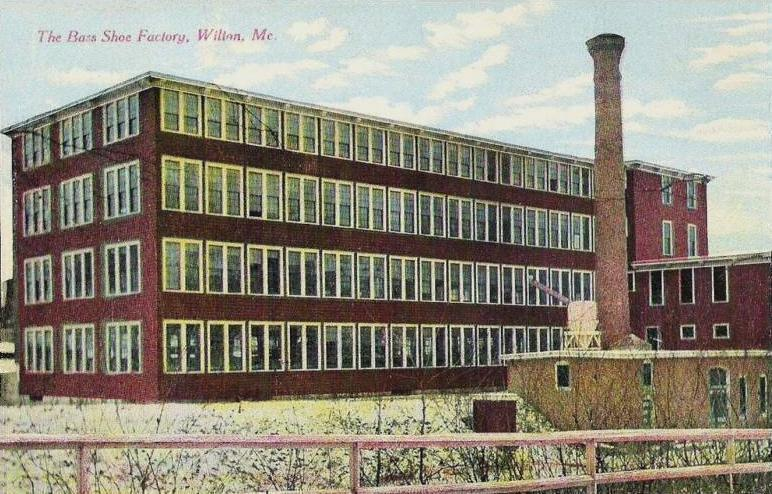
Bass shoe factory in 1914

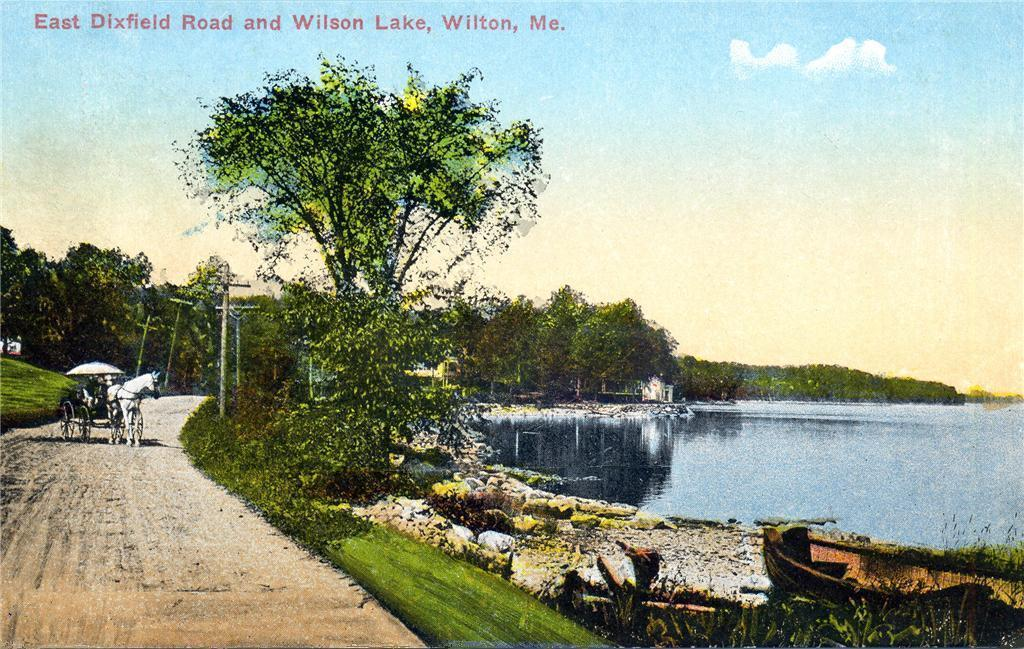
Wilson Lake in 1914

== Geography ==
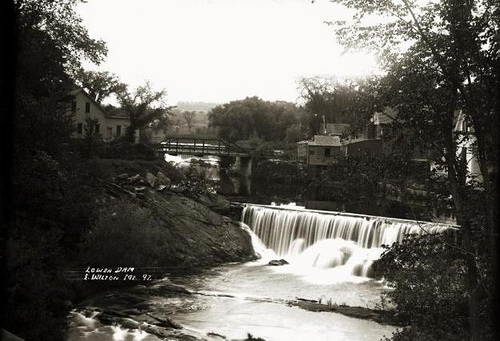
Lower dam on Wilton Stream c. 1915

According to the United States Census Bureau, the town has a total area of 42.82 square miles (110.90 km^{2}), of which 41.26 square miles (106.86 km^{2}) is land and 1.56 square miles (4.04 km^{2}) is water. Home to Wilson Lake (or Pond), Wilton is drained by Wilson Stream, a tributary of the Sandy River, in the Kennebec River watershed. The southwestern corner of town lies within the watershed of the Androscoggin River.

The town is crossed by U.S. Route 2 and state routes 4, 17, 133 and 156. It borders the towns of Farmington to the east, Carthage to the west, Temple to the north, and Jay to the south.

== Demographics ==
Historical population
Census	Pop.	Note	%±
1810	770		—
1820	1,115		44.8%
1830	1,640		47.1%
1840	2,198		34.0%
1850	1,909		−13.1%
1860	1,920		0.6%
1870	1,906		−0.7%
1880	1,739		−8.8%
1890	1,622		−6.7%
1900	1,647		1.5%
1910	2,143		30.1%
1920	2,505		16.9%
1930	3,266		30.4%
1940	3,228		−1.2%
1950	3,455		7.0%
1960	3,274		−5.2%
1970	3,802		16.1%
1980	4,382		15.3%
1990	4,242		−3.2%
2000	4,123		−2.8%
2010	4,116		−0.2%
2020	3,835		−6.8%
U.S. Decennial Census

=== 2010 census ===
As of the census of 2010, there were 4,116 people, 1,708 households, and 1,152 families residing in the town. The population density was 99.8 inhabitants per square mile (38.5/km^{2}). There were 2,025 housing units at an average density of 49.1 per square mile (19.0/km^{2}). The racial makeup of the town was 96.3% White, 0.6% African American, 0.4% Native American, 0.9% Asian, 0.1% from other races, and 1.6% from two or more races. Hispanic or Latino of any race were 0.9% of the population.

There were 1,708 households, of which 30.3% had children under the age of 18 living with them, 50.6% were married couples living together, 11.2% had a female householder with no husband present, 5.6% had a male householder with no wife present, and 32.6% were non-families. 25.8% of all households were made up of individuals, and 10.8% had someone living alone who was 65 years of age or older. The average household size was 2.41 and the average family size was 2.84.

The median age in the town was 43.2 years. 23.3% of residents were under the age of 18; 6.8% were between the ages of 18 and 24; 22.4% were from 25 to 44; 30.9% were from 45 to 64; and 16.7% were 65 years of age or older. The gender makeup of the town was 49.3% male and 50.7% female.

=== 2000 census ===
As of the census of 2000, there were 4,123 people, 1,667 households, and 1,148 families residing in the town. The population density was 99.9 inhabitants per square mile (38.6/km^{2}). There were 1,882 housing units at an average density of 45.6 per square mile (17.6/km^{2}). The racial makeup of the town was 97.45% White, 0.44% Black or African American, 0.39% Native American, 0.80% Asian, 0.10% from other races, and 0.82% from two or more races. Hispanic or Latino of any race were 0.44% of the population.

There were 1,667 households, out of which 31.7% had children under the age of 18 living with them, 54.2% were married couples living together, 11.0% had a female householder with no husband present, and 31.1% were non-families. 24.9% of all households were made up of individuals, and 10.7% had someone living alone who was 65 years of age or older. The average household size was 2.47 and the average family size was 2.94.

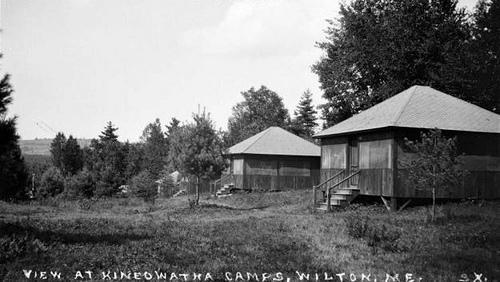
Kineowtha Camp c. 1920

In the town, the population was spread out, with 26.1% under the age of 18, 7.5% from 18 to 24, 27.0% from 25 to 44, 26.1% from 45 to 64, and 13.3% who were 65 years of age or older. The median age was 39 years. For every 100 females, there were 93.2 males. For every 100 females age 18 and over, there were 89.6 males.

The median income for a household in the town was $34,563, and the median income for a family was $42,679. Males had a median income of $32,175 versus $20,300 for females. The per capita income for the town was $17,702. About 5.6% of families and 10.4% of the population were below the poverty line, including 10.2% of those under age 18 and 9.8% of those age 65 or over.

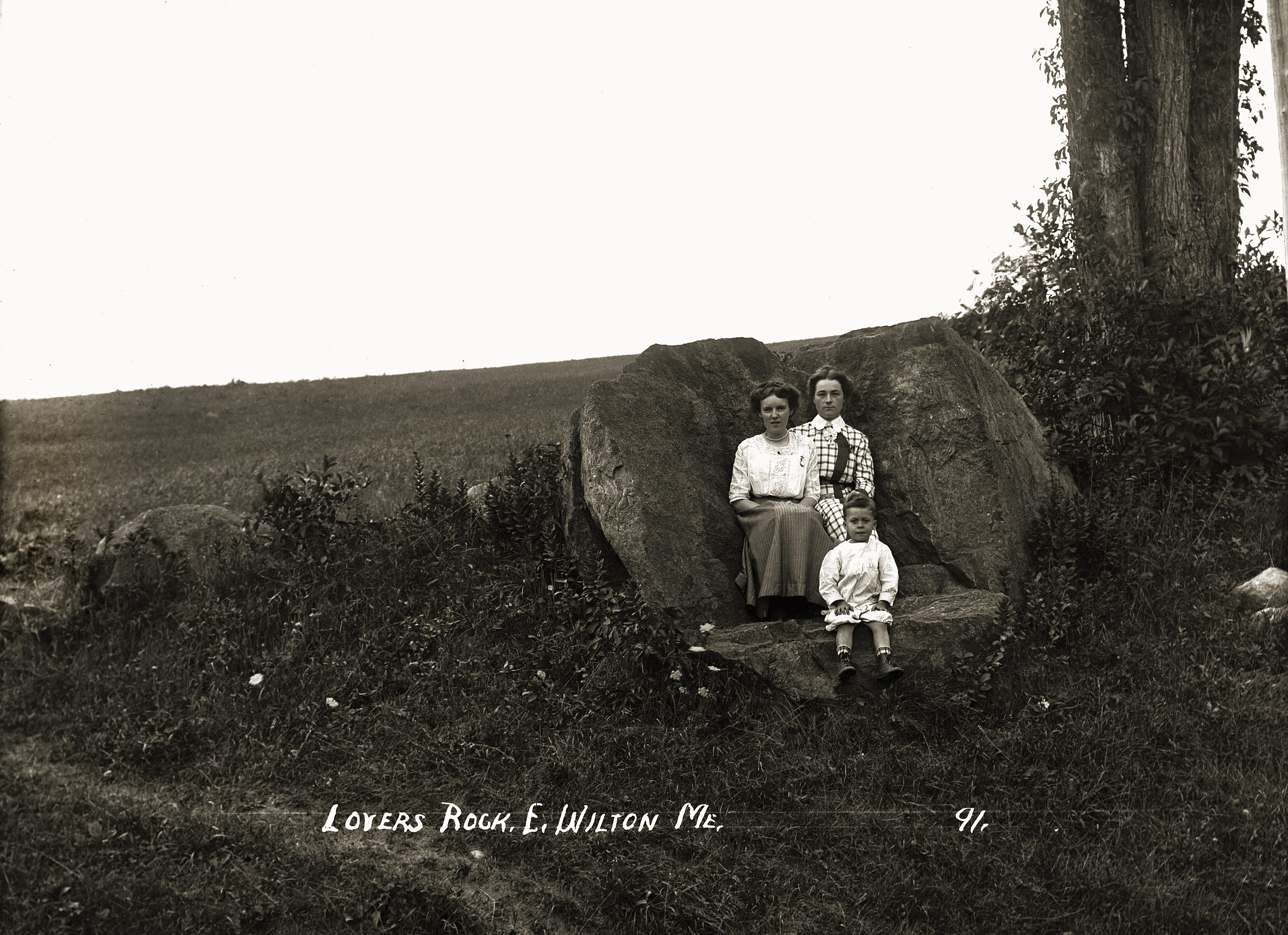
Posing at Lovers' Rock c. 1915

== Education ==
There are two public elementary schools in Wilton: the Gerald D. Cushing School, for grades PreK–1, and the Academy Hill School, for grades 2–5. Total student population is approximately 300. They are part of RSU 9.

== Notable people ==
- David Chamberlain, cross-country skier
- Kathy Lynn Emerson, writer
- Ray Lamontagne, singer
- L. Brooks Leavitt, investment banker, antiquarian book collector
- Alpheus Beede Stickney, railway president
