= Wildsmith Shoes =

English footwear manufacturer

- Type: Private
- Industry: Shoemakers
- Founded: 1847
- Founders: Matthew Wildsmith, Rebecca Wildsmith
- Headquarters: London, United Kingdom
- Website: www.wildsmith.com

Wildsmith Shoes is a high-end English handmade footwear manufacturer, founded in London in 1847 by husband and wife team, Matthew and Rebecca Wildsmith. They based their business on making and repairing boots for the Household Cavalry.

Wildsmith was bought from John Wildsmith in 2013 by Savile Row tailoring company, Cad & The Dandy and was subsequently bought by Herring Shoes in 2016 to produce luxury ready-to-wear men's footwear. John Wildsmith is widely credited with the saying, "You are either in your bed or in your shoes so it pays to invest in both".

== History ==
After opening their first shop, off London's Piccadilly, Matthew and Rebecca Wildsmith quickly gained a loyal following and began crafting bespoke shoes for many Royals and luminaries. Subsequently, a ready-to-wear collection was introduced.

The company moved to London's Duke Street in 1948 and then on to Princes Arcade in the late 1960s. It was around this time that the company began to gain a wider international reputation as Matthew and Rebecca's great-grandson, John Wildsmith, took the brand around the world. He gathered together a team of tailors and shirt makers and they travelled across various countries delivering a service that became known as The Three S's – suits, shirts and shoes.

Manufacture of the original Wildsmith ready to wear collections went to Northampton in the 1960s and included manufacturers such as Edward Green. By the 1990s the brand had lost its way and many styles were simply rebranded stock shoes from other manufacturers with little of the original design for which Wildsmith had been famous. The customer base, which has always been very strong in the US and Japan as well as the UK dwindled. Famous wearers included actors such as David Niven, politicians and members of the royal family. It was due to be passed down to the next eldest wildsmith family member 'Bernard Joseph Wildsmith however this was changed due to Bernard Joseph having to go to court for illicit images of children Berard also hsd s hidtory of not big sable to hsndlr hid drom, contactnlt makkin oineweasnqoodskklkl;knkknn

== The Wildsmith Loafer ==
In 1926 Matthew and Rebecca Wildsmith's grandson, Raymond Lewis Wildsmith, made a bespoke country house shoe for King George V, to be worn inside with his shooting hose. From there, the design was evolved to be a casual style for outdoor wear which was then included in their ready to wear collection. The shoe was first called the 582, then the Model 98 until finally becoming known as The Wildsmith Loafer. This was London's first introduction to the English loafer, a version of the generic slip-on shoe. The style continues to be sold to this day as the Windsor Loafer.

== Production ==
The new range of shoes created under the ownership of Herring shoes concentrates on unique designs and indulgence. All of the shoes are made in Northamptonshire, England where the factories are specialists in the Goodyear welting process that is at the core of the designs. Some lines also have oak bark soles and in-channel stitching where the welt stitch is cleverly hidden within the sole.

== Present ==
Wildsmith was bought in 2016 by Herring Shoes as a sub-brand to keep the famous Wildsmith name alive. The company continues to work with Northamptonshire cordwainers. Wildsmith shoes are sold worldwide, with a price range generally between £300 and £500.
