= G.H. Bass =

American footwear brand

G.H. Bass EST.1876
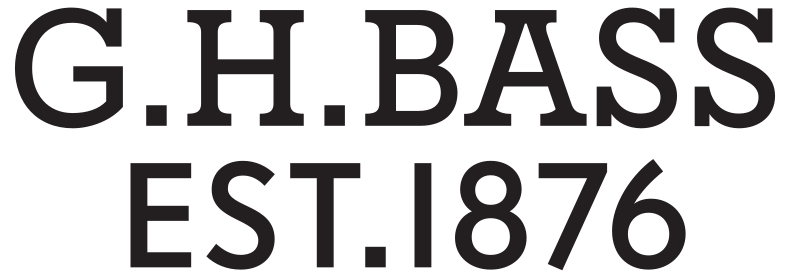

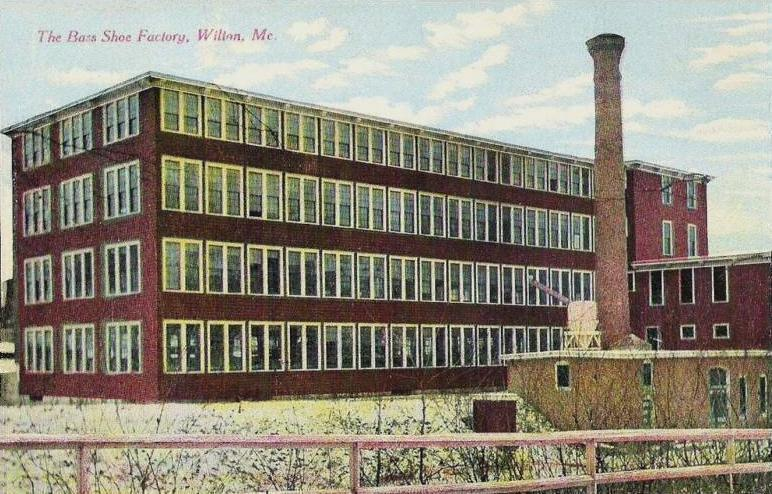
- A 1914 postcard illustration of G. H. Bass & Co. shoe factory in Wilton, Maine
- Industry: Footwear
- Founded: 1876
- Founder: George Henry Bass
- Headquarters: Wilson Stream
- Brands: National Plow Shoe
- Parent: 1978-1987 Chesebrough-Ponds; 1987-2013 PVH; 2013-now G-III Apparel Group

G.H. Bass is an American footwear brand founded by George Henry Bass in 1876. In 1978, Chesebrough-Ponds Inc (Greenwich, Connecticut) purchased G.H. Bass & Co.; they sold it to PVH Corp. in 1987. In November 2013 G-III Apparel Group acquired G.H. Bass & Co. from PVH for $50 million.

== History ==
George Henry Bass, born in Wilton, Maine in 1843, began to work in 1876 in the shoemaking business as junior partner in E.P. Packard & Co. in Wilton. By 1879, he became the sole owner and changed the company name to G.H. Bass & Co. In 1887, the factory moved to Wilson Stream in order to use water-powered machinery.

The National Plow Shoe was created for farmers in 1892.

In 1906, the first Bass moccasin made was the “Bass Moccasin Cruiser”, designed to be a light and flexible shoe worn by woodsmen. By 1906 G.H. Bass & Co. became incorporated. In 1910, “Rangeley” style moccasin was created, and seven years later G.H. Bass & Co. created the Ski Moccasin.

In 1918, by order of the United States government, G.H. Bass & Co. created The official Aviation Boot. It was designed for use in high altitudes wielding protection from the extreme cold. In 1920, G.H. Bass & Co. created a new style of moccasin called the “Woc-O-Moc”. Due to the evolution of the company’s core products, in 1924 the Bass Shoe “For Hard Service” becomes “Bass Outdoor Footwear” in G.H. Bass & Co. catalogs.

After the death of George Henry Bass in 1925, his sons John R. Bass and Willard S. Bass took over management of the business (Willard becoming its president, and John its treasurer). In 1926, the firm opened In-Stock Department at 1104 Commerce Street in Dallas, Texas, to service Southern shoe dealers quicker. In 1928, the firm sued Abbott Co. for infringement of patent for Overlap Seam and trademark of the “Quail Hunter” and “Ike Walton” styles, but lost the suit; in 1929, Bass bought Abbott Co., in order to reacquire exclusive rights to the overlap seam and Ike Walton, “Sportocasin” (Moccasins with spiked soles, golf shoes). During 1928 through 1938 Admiral Richard E. Byrd wore Bass ski boots during the First, Second and Third Antarctic Expedition.

In 1931, the firm opened an office in New York City on the 25th floor of 11 West 42nd Street New York, N.Y. in The Salmon Tower Building. During 1936, Bass “Weejuns” were first made. Four years later, in 1940, the original suede “Buc” style was created. In 1948, the firm outfitted the American Olympic Team with footwear. During World War II, the firm developed a cold-weather boot for U.S. Army’s 10th Mountain Division. In 1967, Sunjuns, a Women’s sandal was first introduced. As they continued to grow in 1968, G.H. Bass & Co. acquired Burgess Shoe Store, giving the firm flexibility of direct retail outlet. In 1969, the firm acquired Rosemount Engineering Co.’s Consumer Product Division in Minnesota.

In 1980, the first G.H. Bass & Co. Country Shop was opened at the May Company Store in Mission Viejo, California. That same year G.H. Bass & Co. began to publish in-house newspaper called The Bass Inner Soul.

In the fall of 1988, G.H. Bass & Co. unveiled the Signature Collection, of three shoe styles, including the Buc, Rangeley and Weejuns. In 1993, The Classic Penny style of Weejuns Collection was renamed Leavitt Penny. In 1997, the firm entered e-commerce with online retail Web site www.ghbass.com. The site is currently run under Harbor Wholesale Ltd. operating with the license to sell G.H. Bass & Co. shoes.

In 2011, Tommy Hilfiger launched a limited edition footwear collection in collaboration with G.H. Bass & Co. The collection was centered around the “Weejuns” penny loafer.
