= Donna Karan =

American fashion designer

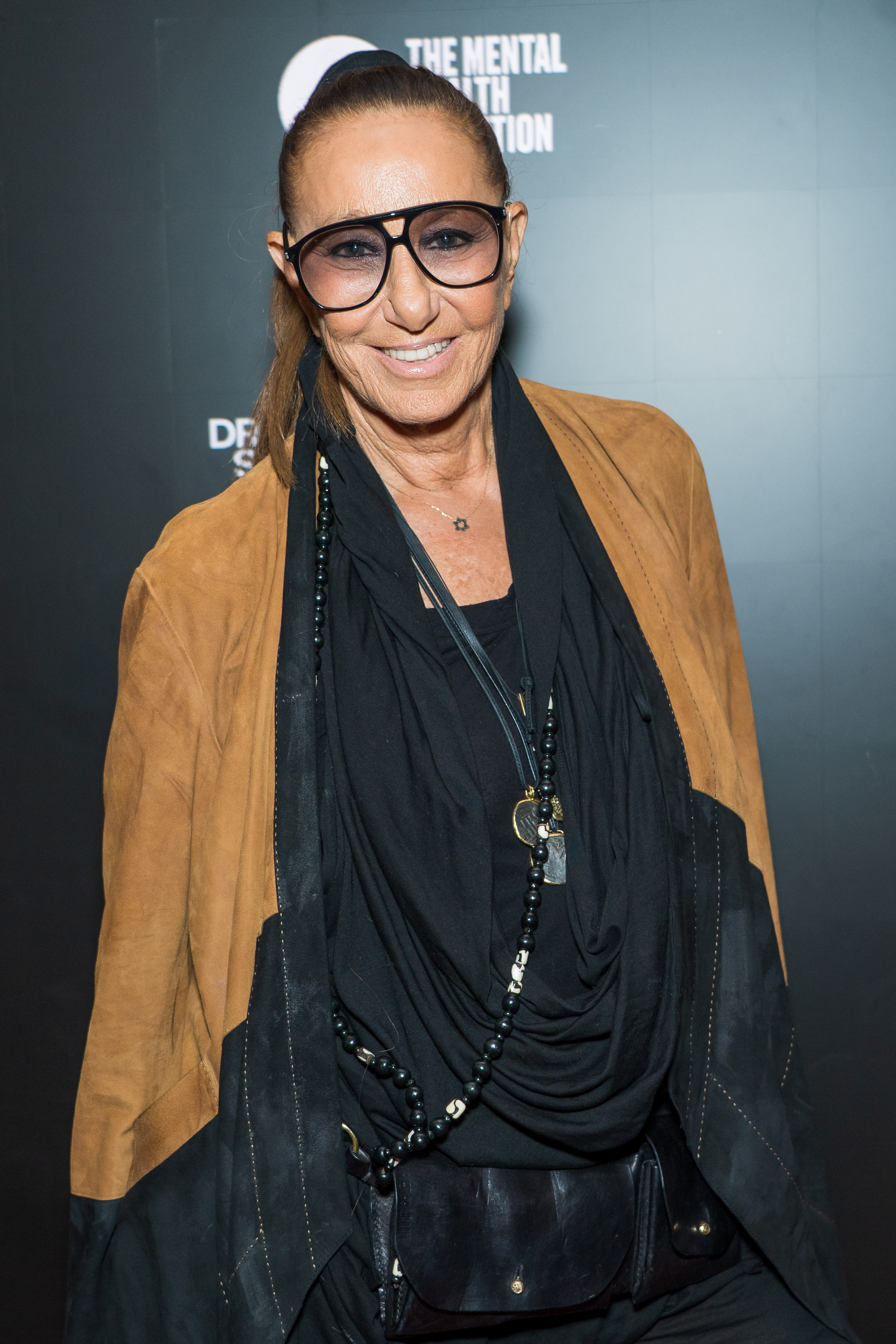
- Karan in 2025
- Born: Donna Ivy Faske; October 2, 1948 (age 77); New York City, U.S.
- Education: The New School
- Label: Donna Karan
- Spouses: Mark Karan (m. 1976; div. 1978); Stephan Weiss (m. 1983; died 2001)
- Children: 2

Donna Karan (/ˈkærən/ KARR-ən; born Donna Ivy Faske), also known as DK, is an American fashion designer and the creator of the Donna Karan New York and DKNY clothing labels.

== Early life and education ==
Karan was born to mother Helen "Queenie" Faske (née Rabinowitz) and father Gabriel "Gabby" Faske (born Faskowitz) in the Forest Hills neighborhood of the Borough of Queens, New York City. Her family is Jewish. Karan's mother had been a model and had also worked in designer Chester Weinberg's showroom. Her father was a tailor and haberdasher who died when Donna was three years old.

Karan and her older sister Gail were raised by their mother in Woodmere, in the Five Towns region of Nassau County, New York. At high school, Karan passed much of her time in the art department. She graduated from Hewlett High School in 1966, and then went to the Parsons School of Design.

== Career ==
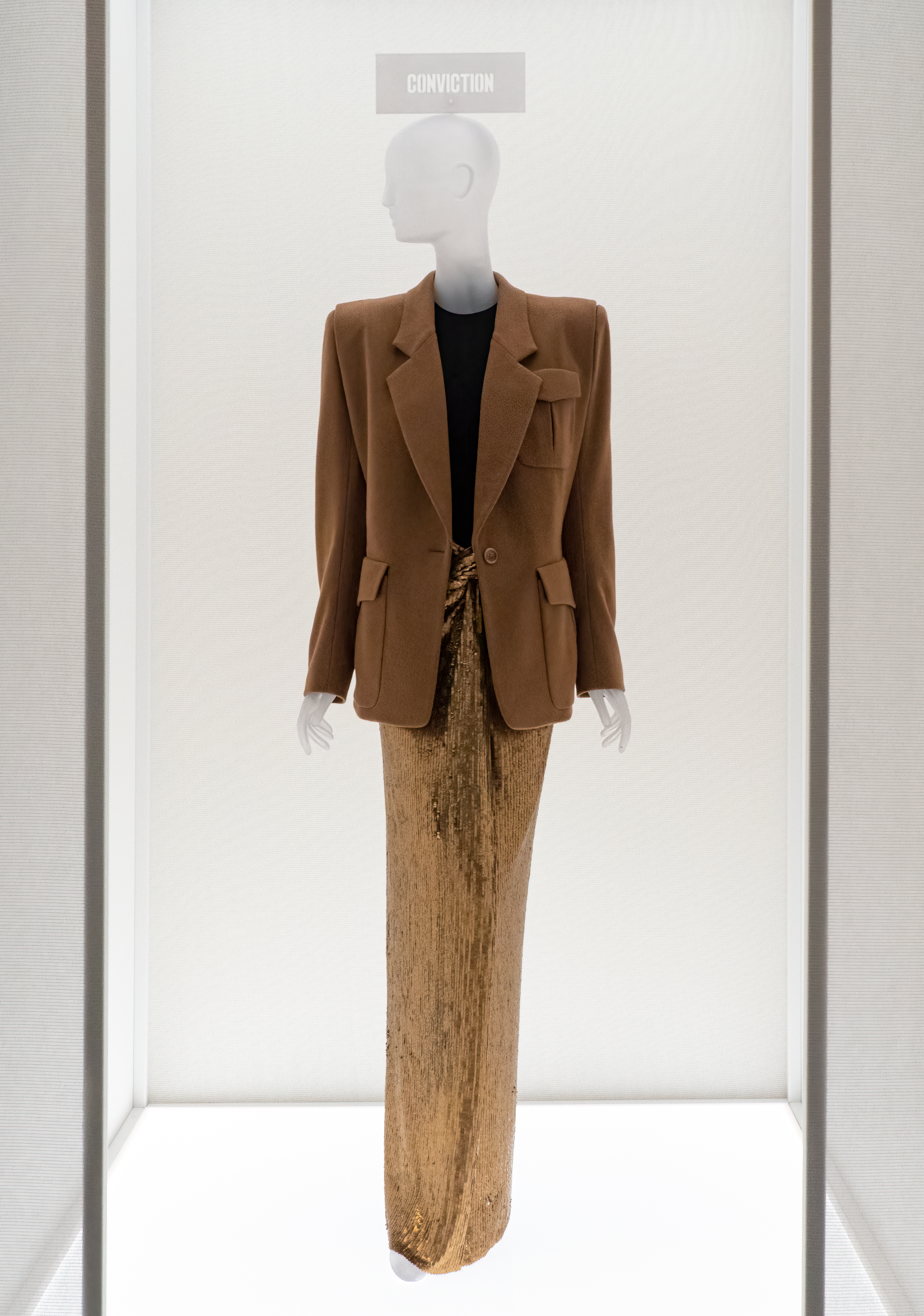
An ensemble Karan designed in 1985–86 in the Metropolitan Museum of Art exhibit In America: A Lexicon of Fashion

After leaving college, Karan worked for Anne Klein, eventually becoming head of the Anne Klein design-team, where she remained until 1984, when she launched her Donna Karan label.

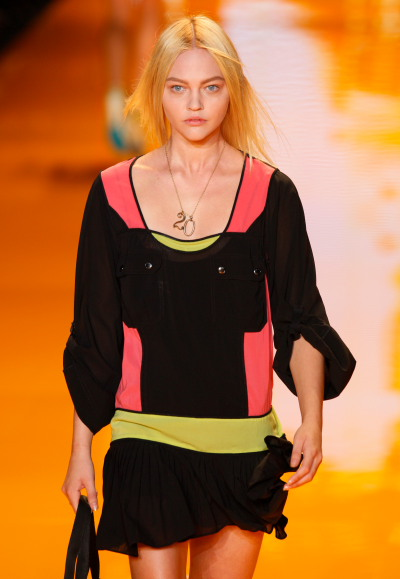
Sasha Pivovarova in DKNY by Donna Karan

Karan began her career as an assistant designer with Anne Klein in the late 1960s, where she was promoted to associate designer in 1971. As Klein's assistant, Karan was a participant in The Battle of Versailles Fashion Show on November 28, 1973. When Klein herself died in 1974, Takihyo Corporation of Japan became the new owner and Karan, together with her former classmate and friend Louis Dell'Olio, became head designer of the house. In 1984, Karan left Anne Klein and, together with her then husband Stephan Weiss and Takihyo Corporation, started her own business "to design modern clothes for modern people". She showed her first women's clothing collection in 1985.

Karan became well known for her 'Essentials' line, initially offering seven easy pieces centered around the bodysuit which could all be mixed and matched, and created a fully integrated wardrobe with her First Collection in 1985. Karan always insisted that she would design only clothes like jersey dresses and opaque Lycra tights that she would wear herself.

In 1988, Karan, nicknamed The Queen Of Seventh Avenue, extended her women's 'Donna Karan New York' line by creating a less expensive clothing line for younger women, called DKNY. Two years later, she created DKNY Jeans, a denim-inspired collection. DKNY for men was launched in 1992, one year after the 'Signature' line for men had been presented. In 1992, Karan also released her "cold shoulder" dress, a jersey long-sleeved dress which featured deep cutouts at the shoulders to reveal the skin beneath.

Karan left her CEO position in 1997, but continued as chairwoman and designer for the Donna Karan line. After 2002, Karan's designer contributions became less and less. In August 2008, Karan relaunched her discontinued fragrance lines from the 1990s.

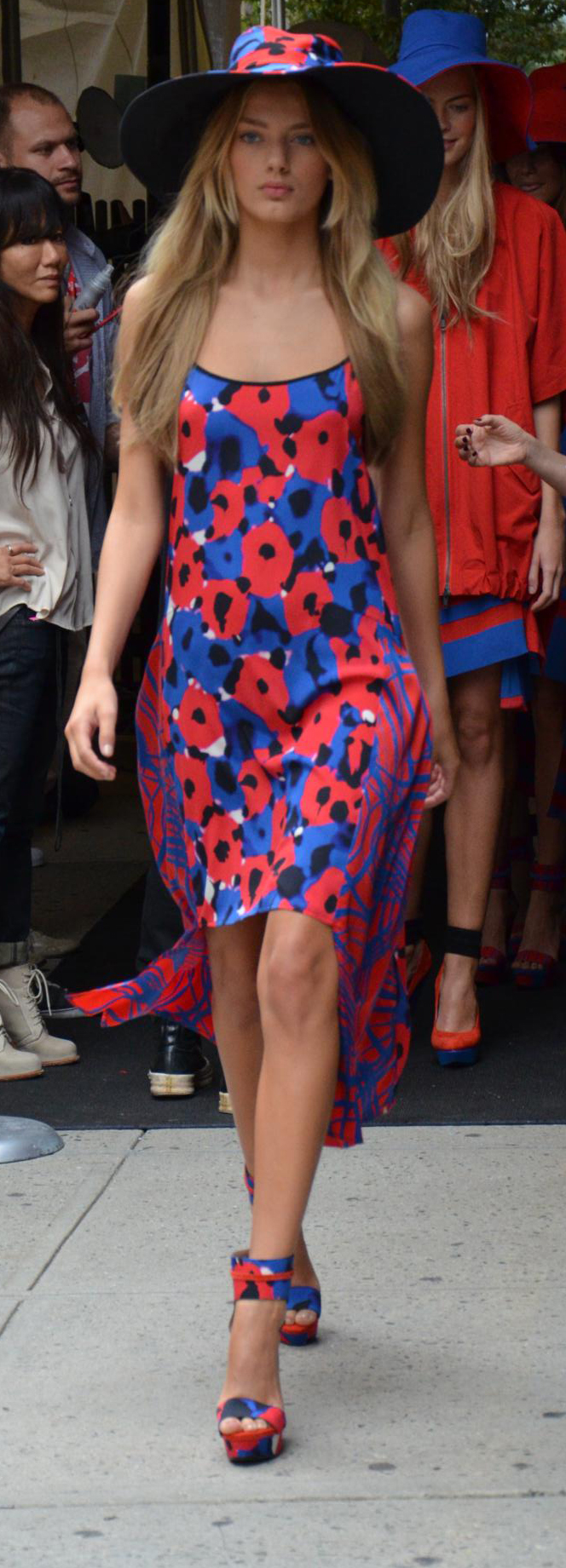
DKNY Spring 2012

In 2015, Donna Karan announced that she would be stepping down as head of her eponymous company to focus on her lifestyle brand, Urban Zen, established by Karan in 2007.

== Awards ==
- 1977: Coty American Fashion Critics’ Award
- 1982: Coty American Fashion Critics’ Award (together with Louis Dell’Ollio for Anne Klein)
- 1984: Inducted into the Coty Hall Of Fame.
- 1986: Special CFDA award - Influence in Head-to-Toe Dressing
- 1992: CFDA Menswear Designer of the Year
- 1994: Golden Plate Award of the American Academy of Achievement
- 1985, 1990, 1996: CFDA Womenswear Designer of the Year
- 1999, Lucky Strike Designer Award.
- 2004: CFDA Lifetime Achievement Award
- 2016: CFDA Founders Award

== Personal life ==
In 1976, Donna Faske married Mark Karan, with whom she had a daughter. They divorced in 1978. In 1983, she married artist Stephan Weiss, who became co-CEO of the Donna Karan company. Weiss died of lung cancer in 2001.

== General and cited references ==
- Hyman, Paula E.; Moore, Deborah Dash (1997). Jewish Women in America: An Historical Encyclopedia. New York: American Jewish Historical Society. ISBN 0-4159-1936-3.
