= DKNY =

New York-based fashion house

Donna Karan International Inc.
- Type: Subsidiary
- Industry: Fashion
- Founded: 1984; 42 years ago
- Founders: Donna Karan; Stephan Weiss
- Headquarters: New York City, U.S. 40.75443°N 73.98845°W
- Products: Fashion, leather goods and watches
- Parent: LVMH (2001–2016); G-III Apparel Group (2016–present)
- Website: www.dkny.com

DKNY is a New York City–based United States fashion house founded in 1984 by Donna Karan. The company specializes in a wide range of fashion products, including clothing, footwear, accessories and fragrances.

== History ==
Karan worked for 15 years at Anne Klein, including 10 as its head designer. In 1984 Karan and her late husband Stephan Weiss were offered the opportunity to start their own business by the owner of Anne Klein, Takihyo LLC.

The company became a publicly traded venture in 1996.

In 2001, it was purchased by the French conglomerate corporation LVMH (Louis Vuitton Moët Hennessy). In 2015, Donna Karan left as chief designer at Donna Karan International, to focus on her Urban Zen brand and Urban Zen Foundation philanthropy. LVMH sold Donna Karan International, with the 'Donna Karan' and 'DKNY' brands, to the G-III Apparel Group in 2016 for $650 million. G-III, based in New York City, is a manufacturer and distributor of clothing and accessories under their owned brands, licensed brands, and private label brands.

== Donna Karan New York ==
Donna Karan's mainline label Donna Karan New York, also referred as Donna Karan Collection, debuted for fall 1985 with the women's collection Seven Easy Pieces, "where a handful of interchangeable items work together to create an entire wardrobe that goes from day to evening, week day to weekend, season to season". In July 1991, she launched her first menswear collection.

The "New York" part on the label is there to set "the pace, the attitude" of the fashion house's offering.

== DKNY and other divisions ==
Inspired by her daughter Gaby, Donna Karan founded DKNY in 1989 as a younger, more affordable diffusion line to run alongside her existing Donna Karan New York label. At the time of their introduction, DKNY clothes were meant for weekends and casual wear, and generally half the price of the regular Donna Karan collection. Many labels and brands have branched off of the original DKNY brand/label including DKNY Jeans, DKNY Active, DKNY Underwear, DKNY Juniors, DKNY Kids, DKNY Pure. DKNY Men, launched in 1992, consists of tailored suits, dress wear, formalwear, casual wear, sportswear, and shoes. In 2013, DKNY collaborated with Opening Ceremony to reissue select styles from the 1990s.

The Donna Karan Beauty collection, which specializes in fragrances, was launched in 1992. In 2001, the Donna Karan Home collection, which includes traditional luxury bedding and accessories, and DKNY Home, which has more contemporary and fashion-forward bedding, were introduced.

For its advertisement campaigns, DKNY has been working with several high-profile photographers, including Collier Schorr (2017) and Mikael Jansson (2025). Cara Delevingne was the face of DKNY for multiple seasons in the mid 2010s. Subsequent DKNY campaigns have featured Emily Ratajkowski (2017), Kaia Gerber (2024) and Hailey Bieber (2025). In 2025, Hailey Bieber was named the global ambassador of the brand.

== Stores ==
Stores opened in London in 1997 and New York City in 1999. The DKNY headquarters is located at 550 Seventh Avenue in Manhattan, New York. There are currently seventy Donna Karan collection and DKNY stores globally, including twenty stores in China including Hong Kong and Shanghai, two stores in Canada, namely Vancouver, B.C. and Montreal, four in Dubai and also two stores in Doha.

Since 2005, Donna Karan has offered online shopping of its DKNY and associated lines at the label's web site. Products range from DKNY and DKNY Jeans womenswear, accessories, underwear, shoes, baby clothing, the PURE collection to DKNY menswear. The latter was available up until the spring 2002 season. Since then, only the DKNY Jeans label, underwear, eyewear and watches have been offered online for men.

== Controversy ==
In 2013, DKNY became embroiled in controversy over street photography it admitted it used in one of its stores, without permission, from the New York City street photographer Brandon Stanton, the creator of Humans of New York (HONY). After Stanton learned of the use of his photography, he publicly asked DKNY to donate $100,000 to the YMCA to help with summer programs. Amidst strong criticism on social media sites, DKNY apologized and donated $25,000 to the YMCA. Stanton then asked his followers on the HONY Facebook page to make up the difference to reach his initial goal of $100,000, which was reached on March 1, 2013.

In July 2016, French luxury giant LVMH shelved her flagship line Donna Karan International shortly after she left in June 2015 and said it would "substantially increase its focus" on her DKNY brand. LVMH reported targeting a "single, specific American buyer" for both the DKNY and Donna Karan International businesses after several "months of disappointing performance" under its new designers Dao-Yi Chow and Maxwell Osbourne.

LVMH later sold DKNY to the G-III Apparel Group in 2016 for $650 million.
