= JCPenney =

American department store chain

Penney OpCo LLC
- Logo used on-and-off since 2008 (Note: Used from 2008–2011, 2013–2019, and 2023–present)

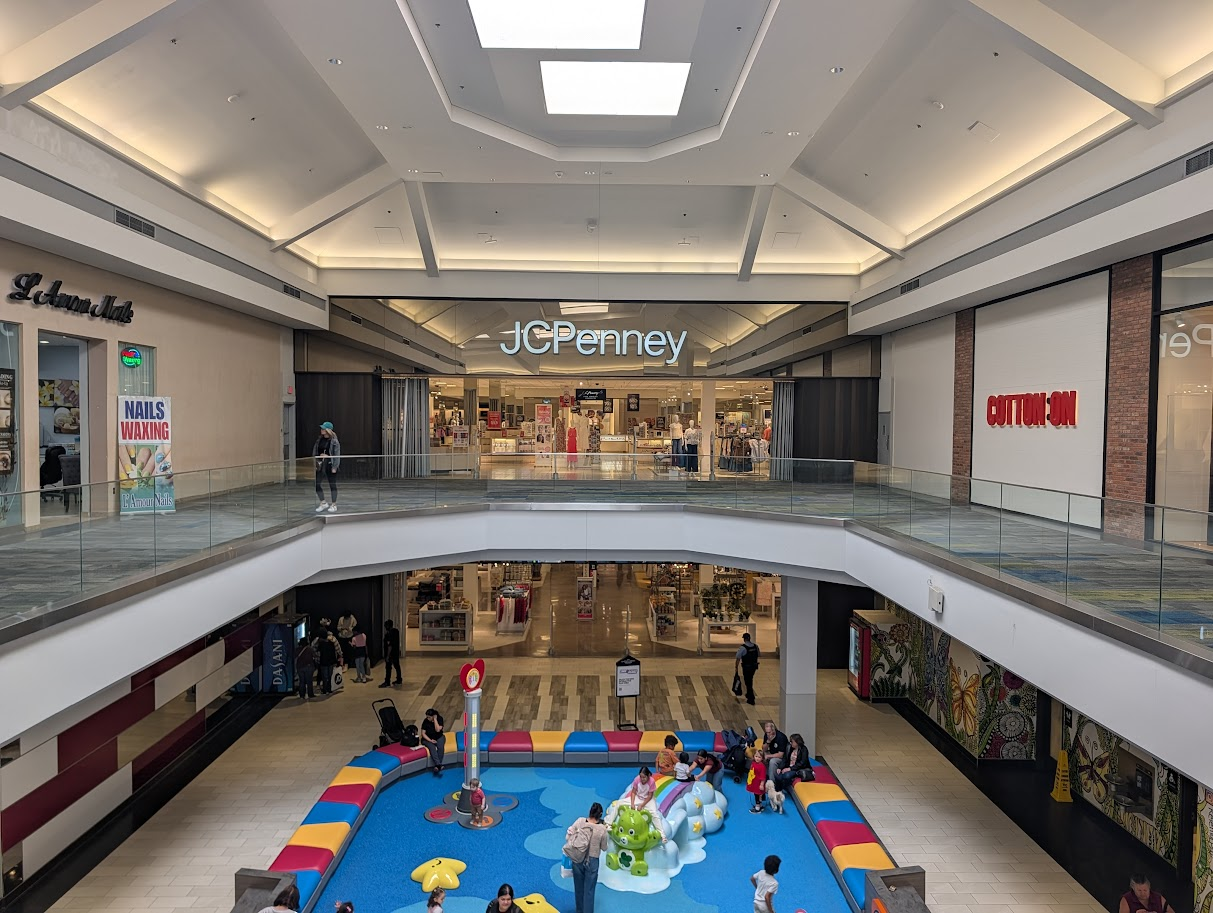
- JCPenney at Barton Creek Square (March 2026)
- Trade name: JCPenney
- Formerly: J. C. Penney Company, Inc.; Golden Rule Store
- Type: Subsidiary
- Traded as: NYSE: JCP (1927–2020)
- Industry: Retail
- Genre: Department store
- Founded: April 14, 1902; 124 years ago Kemmerer, Wyoming, U.S.
- Founders: James Cash Penney; William Henry McManus
- Defunct: October 2011 (JCPenney Outlet Store); December 31, 2013 (JC's 5 Star Outlet)
- Fate: For JCPenney Outlet Store/JC's 5 Star Outlet: Liquidation
- Headquarters: Plano, Texas, U.S.
- Number of locations: 640 (September 2026)
- Area served: United States; Puerto Rico
- Key people: Marc Rosen (CEO, Catalyst); Michelle Wlazlo (Brand CEO)
- Products: Clothing; footwear; accessories; jewelry; beauty products; home furnishings and wares; electronics; toys; hair styling; eyeglasses; portraits
- Parent: Authentic Brands Group (2020–2025); Catalyst Brands (2025–present); For JC's 5 Star Outlet: SB Capital Group (2011–2013)
- Website: jcpenney.com

JCPenney (legally Penney OpCo LLC; abbreviated JCP and colloquially Penney's) is an American department store chain founded in 1902 by James Cash Penney. It is owned by Catalyst Brands, a joint venture between Authentic Brands Group, Brookfield Corporation, and Simon Property Group, since 2025.

JCPenney originated as a group of dry goods stores that Penney managed as part of the Golden Rule chain and incorporated under his own name in 1913. The stores were initially located in downtown areas but shifted to shopping malls during the 1960s. The chain struggled in the early 21st century amid the rise of internet retail and the decline of mall traffic, and stay-home measures during the COVID-19 pandemic forced it into Chapter 11 bankruptcy in May 2020. It emerged from bankruptcy under the joint ownership of mall operators Simon Property Group and Brookfield Properties, later joined by Authentic Brands Group as a minority owner. In January 2025, JCPenney was combined with SPARC Group—Simon and Authentic's portfolio of legacy retail brands—to form Catalyst Brands.

Its departments include men's, women's and children's apparel, cosmetics, jewelry, and home furnishings along with leased departments managed by Shearshare, US Vision and Lifetouch. The chain focuses on lifestyle products for middle class households.

== 20th century ==
=== Background and early history: 1902–1960 ===
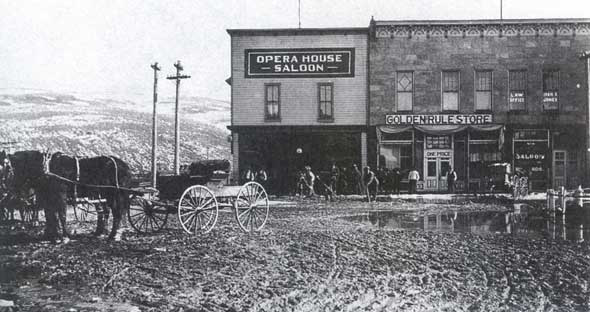
First J. C. Penney store in Kemmerer, Wyoming. Originally called The Golden Rule Store

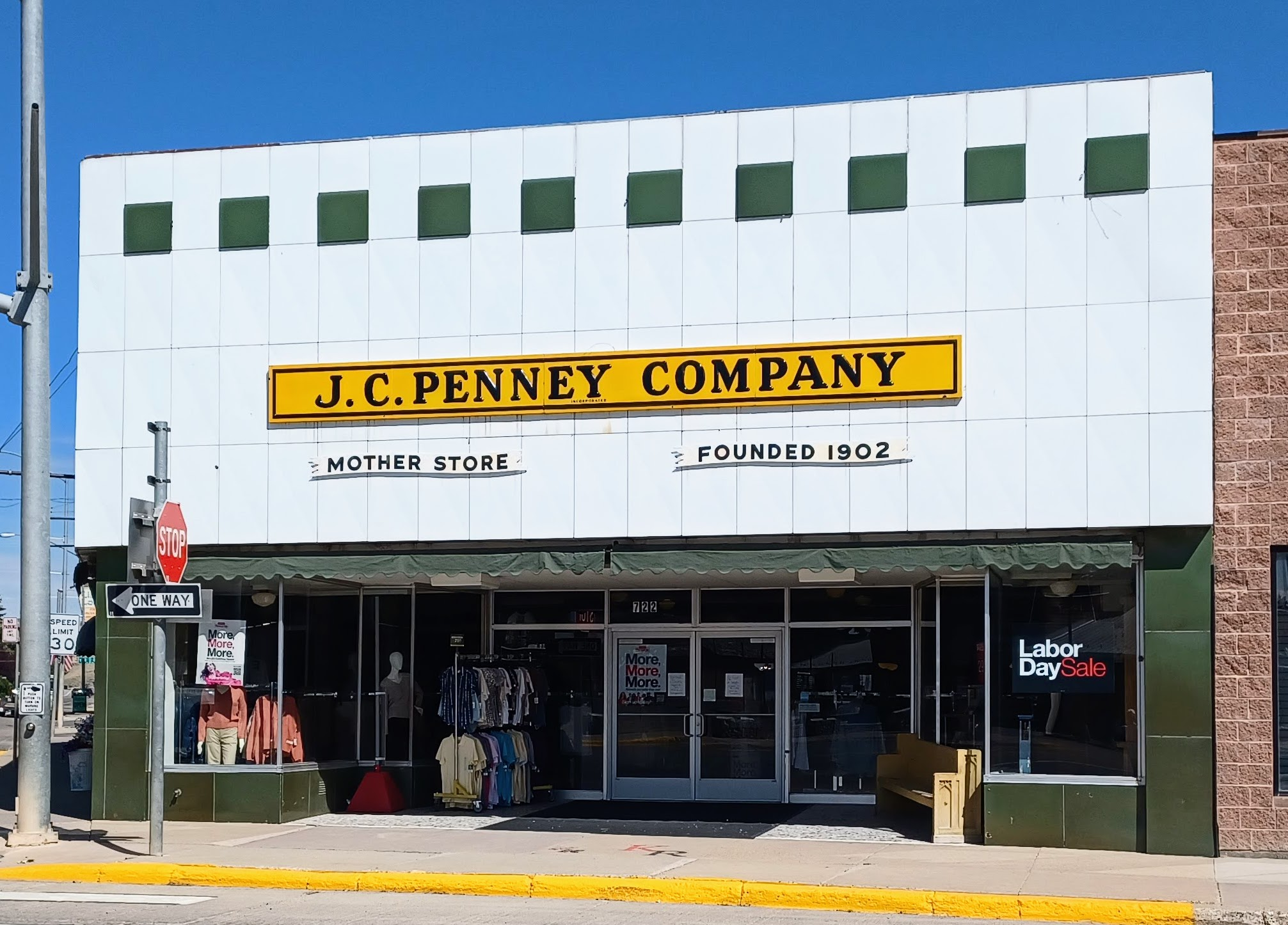
JCPenney mother store in Kemmerer, Wyoming

James Cash Penney was born in Hamilton, Missouri. After graduating from high school, Penney worked for a local retailer. He relocated to Colorado at the advice of a doctor, hoping that a better climate would improve his health. In 1898, Penney went to work for Thomas Callahan and Guy Johnson, who owned dry goods stores called Golden Rule stores in Colorado and Wyoming. In 1899, Callahan sent Penney to Evanston, Wyoming, to work with Johnson in another Golden Rule store. Callahan and Johnson asked Penney to join them in opening a new Golden Rule store. Using money from savings and a loan, Penney joined the partnership and moved with his wife and infant son to Kemmerer, Wyoming, to start his own store. Penney opened the store on April 14, 1902. He participated in the creation of two more stores and purchased full interest in all three locations when Callahan and Johnson dissolved their partnership in 1907. In 1909, Penney moved his company headquarters to Salt Lake City, Utah, to be closer to banks and railroads. By 1912, Penney had 34 stores in the Rocky Mountain States.

In 1913, the company was incorporated under the new name, J. C. Penney Company, with William Henry McManus as a co-founder. In 1914, the headquarters was moved to New York City to simplify buying, financing, and transportation of goods. By 1917, the company operated 175 stores in 22 states in the United States. J. C. Penney acquired The Crescent Corset Company in 1920, the company's first wholly owned subsidiary. In 1922, the company's oldest active private brand, Big Mac work clothes, was launched. The company opened its 500th store in 1924 in Hamilton, Missouri, James Cash Penney's hometown. By the opening of the 1,000th store in 1928, gross business had reached $190 million (equivalent to $3.56 billion in 2025).

In 1940, Sam Walton began working at a J. C. Penney in Des Moines, Iowa. Walton subsequently founded retailer Walmart in 1962. By 1941, J. C. Penney operated 1,600 stores in all 48 states. In 1956, J. C. Penney started national advertising with a series of advertisements in Life magazine. J. C. Penney credit cards were first issued in 1959.

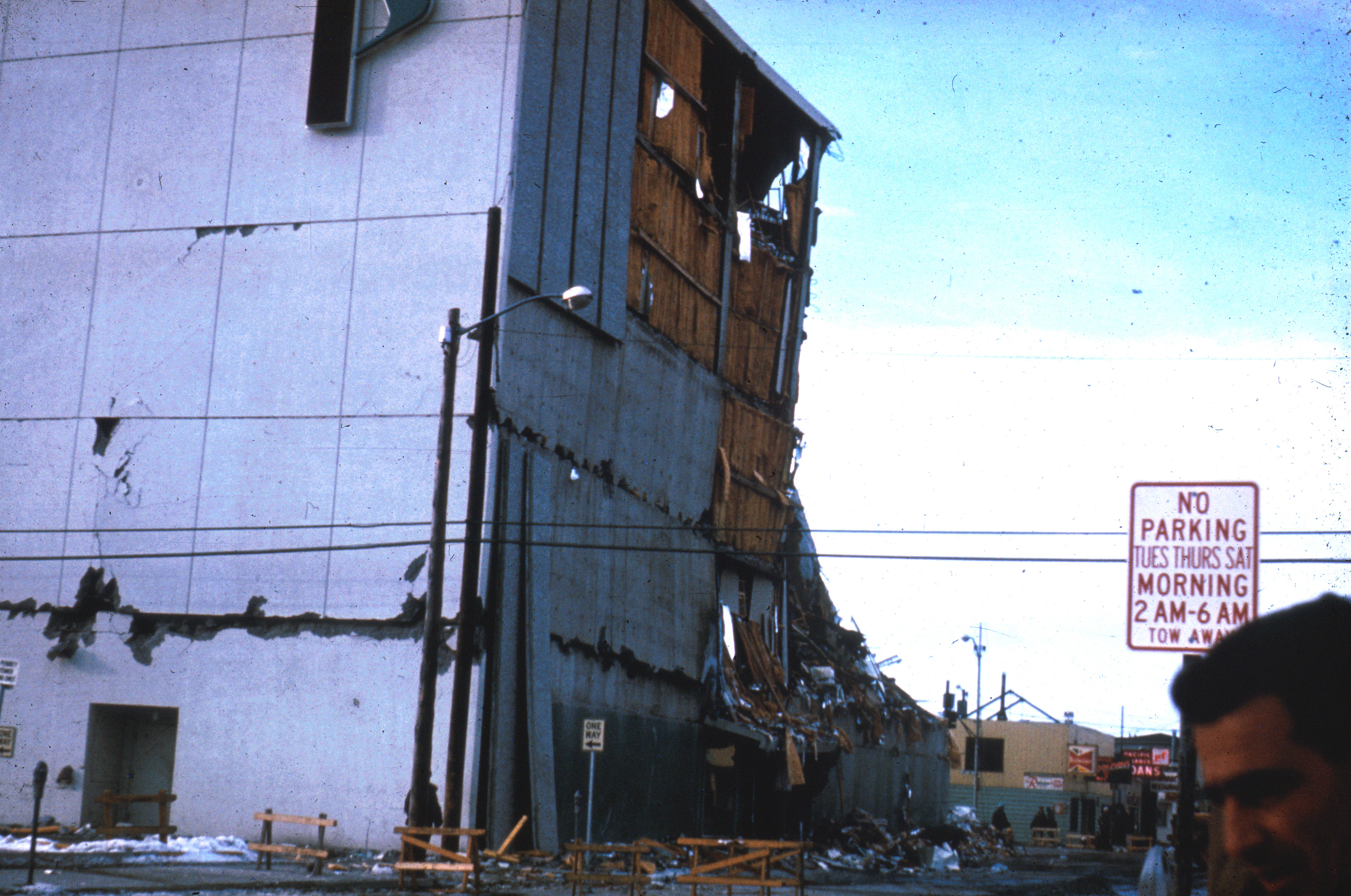
Penney Building in Anchorage in 1964, following the earthquake

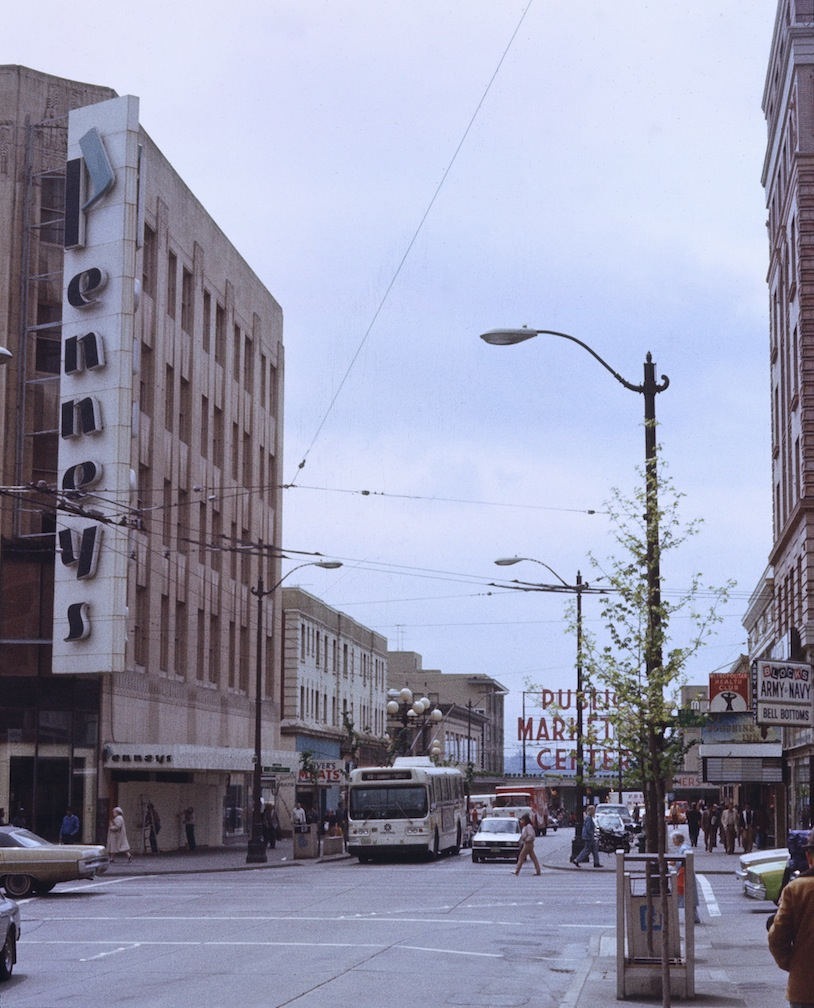
Former Downtown Seattle store in 1982, with signage from the period when the chain was branded as Penneys and used a more stylized font in its logo. Pike Place Market is in the background.

=== Full-line department store ===
The company dedicated its first full-line shopping-center department store in 1961. This store was located at Black Horse Pike Center in Audubon, New Jersey. The second full-line shopping center store was dedicated, at King of Prussia Plaza in King of Prussia, Pennsylvania in late 1962. Those stores expanded the lines of merchandise and services that an average J. C. Penney carried to include appliances (manufactured by General Electric), sporting goods, tools, garden\lawn merchandise, restaurants, beauty salons, portrait studios, auto parts, and auto centers.

In 1962, J. C. Penney entered discount merchandising with the acquisition of General Merchandise Company which gave them The Treasury stores. These discount operations proved unsuccessful and were shuttered in 1981. In 1963, J. C. Penney issued its first catalog. The company operated in-store catalog desks in eight states. The catalogs were distributed by the Milwaukee Catalog distribution center.

In 1969, the company acquired Thrift Drug, a chain of drugstores headquartered in Pittsburgh, Pennsylvania. It also acquired Supermarkets Interstate, an Omaha-based food retailer which operated leased departments in J. C. Penney stores, The Treasury stores, and Thrift Drug stores.

=== Expansion beyond the contiguous US ===
In the 1960s, JCPenney expanded to include Alaska, Hawaii, and Puerto Rico. Stores were opened in Anchorage and Fairbanks, Alaska in 1962, followed by Honolulu, Hawaii in 1966, and Puerto Rico in 1968. The Penney Building in Anchorage partially collapsed and was damaged beyond repair in the 1964 Alaska earthquake. The company rebuilt the store as a shorter building on a larger footprint and followed up by building Anchorage's first public parking garage, which opened in 1968. The Honolulu store was located at Ala Moana Center, and closed in 2003, along with all remaining locations in the state, making Hawaii the only U.S. state to not currently have a JCPenney store. The Penney store at Plaza Las Américas mall in San Juan, Puerto Rico, which opened in 1968, featured three levels and 261,500 square feet (24,290 m^{2}). It was the largest JCPenney until a 300,000-square-foot (28,000 m^{2}) store was dedicated at Greater Chicago's Woodfield Mall in 1971. The Woodfield Mall store served as the largest in the chain until a replacement store opened at Plaza Las Américas in 1998, which is 350,000 square feet (33,000 m^{2}) in size.

=== Death of J.C. Penney and peak: 1970s ===
On February 12, 1971, James Cash Penney died at the age of 95. That year, the company adopted the JCPenney style in advertising. and its revenues reached $5 billion (equivalent to $39.7 billion in 2025) for the first time and catalog business made a profit for the first time.

JCPenney reached its peak number of stores in 1973, with 2,053 stores, 300 of which were full-line establishments. However, the company was hard hit by the 1974 recession with its stock price declining by two-thirds.

In 1977, J. C. Penney sold its four stores in Italy to Italian department store chain La Rinascente; Penneys had opened in Italy in 1970 but left due to difficulties encountered when trying to expand in Italy and had only ever opened stores in the Lombardy region. In the same year they also closed down their unprofitable Supermarkets Interstate supermarket brand, which operated in Treasury discount stores; however, the stores that were not in Treasury locations remained open.

In 1978, the J. C. Penney Historic District in Kemmerer, Wyoming, was designated a U.S. National Historic Landmark. In 1979, JCPenney stores started accepting Visa cards. MasterCard was accepted the following year.

=== 1980s ===
In 1980, the company closed the unprofitable Treasury discount stores to focus resources on its core retail stores.

In 1983, JCPenney discontinued its appliance, hardware, outdoor equipment, and auto center departments, the store attached auto centers became additional store and warehouse space, the free-standing automotive centers were sold to Firestone. Also in 1983, it began selling goods online through the Viewtron videotex service. That same year, fashion designer Roy Halston, signed a six-year, $1 billion deal with JCPenney to sell a line of affordable clothing, accessories, cosmetics, and perfumes ranging in price from $24 to $200. The move was considered controversial then as no other high-end designer up to that point in time had licensed their designs to a mid-price retailer. The line, named Halston III, would not last long, as it would be poorly received and discontinued after about a year. However, the business move paved the way for other such high-end designers to sell their products at stores of varying price ranges in the future.

In 1984, JCPenney acquired the First National Bank of Harrington, Delaware, and renamed it J. C. Penney National Bank. With the acquisition of the bank, the company became able to issue its own Mastercard and Visa Inc. cards. The company also began accepting American Express cards. Also that year, Thrift Drug began co-locating stores with Weis Markets, and acquired many former Pantry Pride properties. In April 1987, the company announced that it was moving its headquarters to Plano, Texas. After several years of development, the JCPenney Television Shopping Channel appeared on cable systems beginning in 1989. By the mid-1980s, all JCPenney stores had discontinued sales of firearms. Before this point, JCPenney carried rifles and shotguns branded as JCPenney but produced by numerous established firearms manufacturers. In the 1980s JCPenney's also stopped selling outdoor equipment and hardware such as lawn mowers and tools.

=== Acquisitions and international expansion: 1990s ===
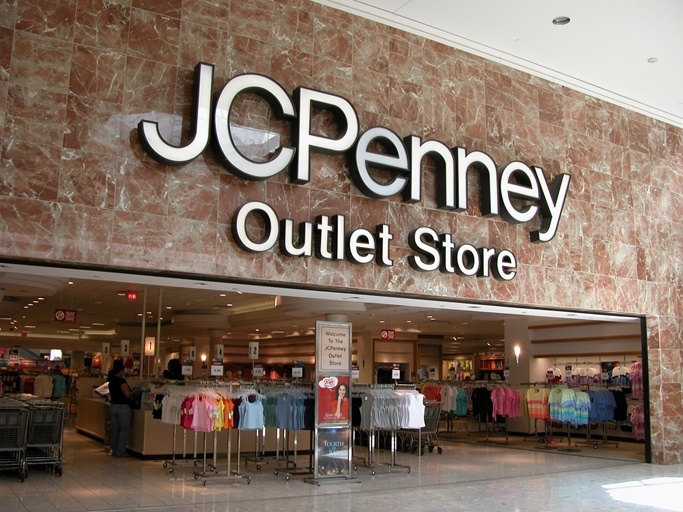
Mall entrance of the now-closed JCPenney outlet store at the Jamestown Mall in Florissant, Missouri (1998)

Construction on the new company headquarters in Plano, Texas, broke ground in 1990 and was completed in 1992. When Sears closed its catalog business in 1993, JCPenney became the largest catalog retailer in the United States. In 1995 the chain expanded to Chile with a store in the capital, Santiago. In 1995, the drug store business was expanded with the acquisition of Kerr Drug and again in 1996 with the purchase of Fay's Drug. Then in November 1996 they acquired the Eckerd chain. Fay's, Kerr, and Eckerd merged into J. C. Penney's drug store subsidiary Thrift Drug. Fay's, most Kerr, and Thrift drug stores were re-branded Eckerd in 1997. (Kerr Drug stores in The Carolinas remained branded as such because they were part of a group of stores that were divested because of trade competition issues raised during the merger.)

On December 9, 1998, The New York Times reported JCPenney would acquire controlling interest of Lojas Renner for a little over $33 million, which increased the company's maneuvering ability with their already existing units in Chile, Mexico and Puerto Rico. In 1998, JCPenney launched its online store.

Between 1995 and 1998, JCPenney entered Indonesia under partnership with Lippo Group (under their Multipolar investment arm) with the branding JCPenney Collections, also used by multiple international JCPenney branches across Asia during the decade. This type of JCPenney store only featured fashion for men, women and kids. During its tenure, JCPenney opened two flagship stores: in 1995 on the upper ground level of Lippo Supermal (now Supermal Karawaci), and in 1996 on the upper ground and first level of Mal Taman Anggrek. Aside from the two, JCPenney also opened smaller stores under the JCPenney Collections name in a few malls such as Plaza Blok M and Plaza Senayan. All stores of JCPenney Collections in Indonesia started planning to close down due to 1997 Asian financial crisis – with the JCPenney Collections store in Taman Anggrek closed in December 1997, and the May 1998 riots – with the Lippo Supermal store looted by mass and exiting the mall that same month (having to close down for a period of time due to damage caused by arson in other sections of the mall). Currently, the previous stores are occupied by H&M, Uniqlo, and Sogo at Supermal Karawaci and Matahari Department Store at Mal Taman Anggrek respectively.

JCPenney left Chile in 1999, after five years in the country it closed down its home store and sold its main store in Santiago to Almacenes Paris. The stores were closed due to low profitability and high expenses.

== 21st century ==
=== 2000s ===
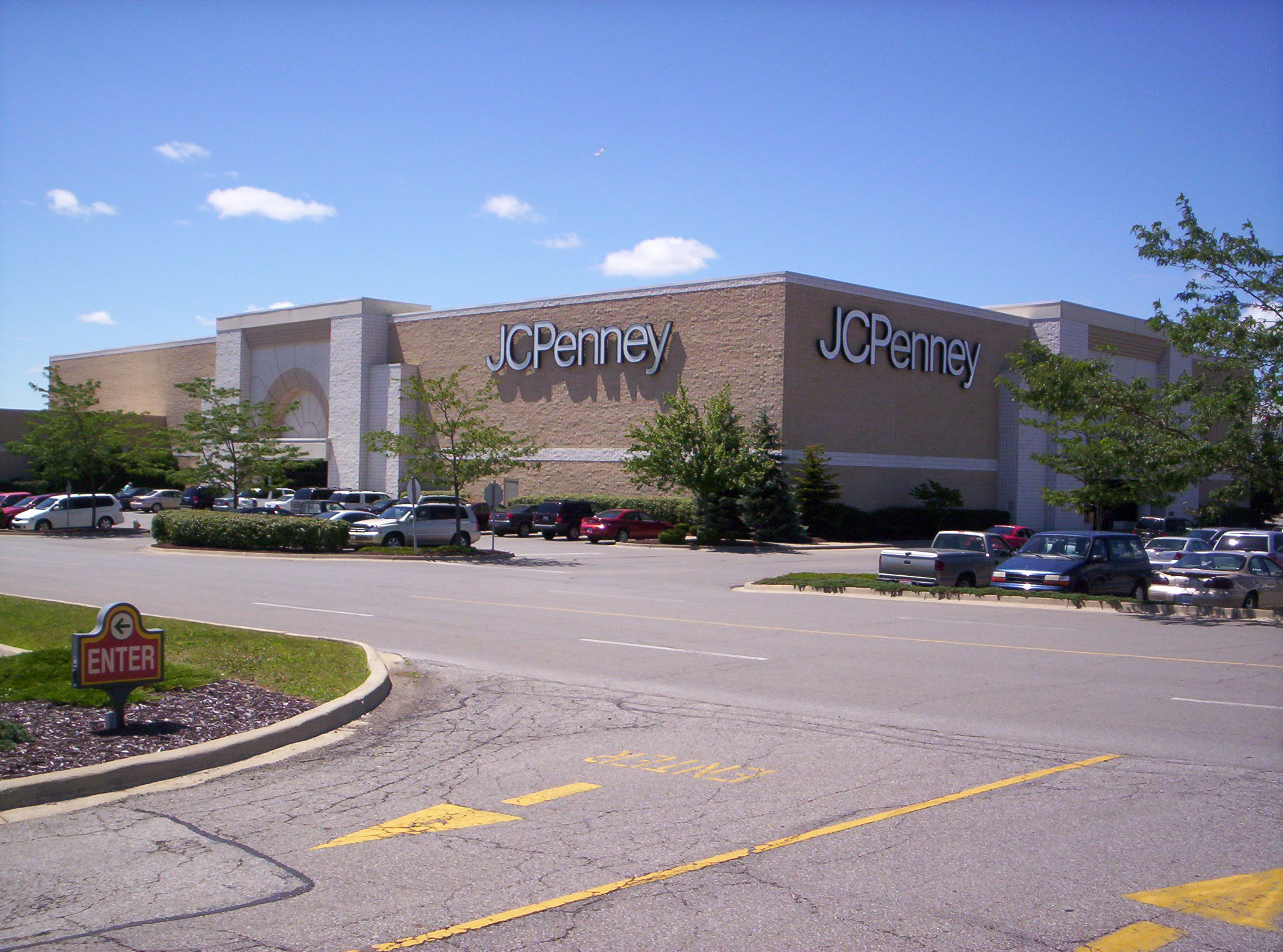
Exterior of the JCPenney store at the Richland Mall in Ontario, Ohio (2008)

In early 2001, JCPenney closed 44 under-performing stores. In 2001, JCPenney sold its direct-marketing insurance unit to Dutch insurer Aegon for $1.3 billion (equivalent to $2.36 billion in 2025) in cash to help refocus the company on retail. In 2003, the company opened three stores in strip centers in Texas, Minnesota, and Indiana. The new single-level, 94,000 sq ft (8,700 m^{2}) store format focuses on convenience, with wider aisles and centralized checkouts. In 2004, the company added 14 more stores and exited the drug store division after 35 years, with the sale of its Eckerd division. The company also sold its six Mexico stores to Grupo Carso, which rebranded five of the stores as Dorian's and the other one as Sears Mexico. In 2005, JCPenney's e-commerce storefront exceeded the $1 billion revenue mark for the first time. At the same time in June, the company would sell off its shares of Lojas Renner, the Brazilian-based retailer, generating $260 million from the sale as it discontinued its operations with Renner and its Latin American footholds as well.

In 2007, JCPenney launched the Ambrielle lingerie label, which became its largest private brand launched in the company's history. JCPenney also re-introduced cosmetics with the opening of Sephora "stores-within-a-store" inside some JCPenney locations. Beginning in 2007, JCPenney's store slogan changed from "It's All Inside" to "Every Day Matters." The new slogan and associated ad campaign was launched in television commercials during the 79th Academy Awards in late February 2007. After JCPenney sold off Eckerd in 2004, the locations that continued to operate as Eckerd (some locations in the Southern U.S. were sold to CVS Corporation) still had JCPenney Catalog Centers inside the stores (which was a carryover from locations that were once Thrift Drug) and continued to accept JCPenney credit cards. After Rite Aid finalized its acquisition of Eckerd in 2007, the Catalog Centers inside the soon-to-be-converted stores permanently closed. Although as a result of the acquisition, Rite Aid now accepts JCPenney credit cards, even at Rite Aid locations that existed before the acquisition of Eckerd. In November 2007, the company launched a new public website, JCPenneyBrands.com, which covers the company's private and exclusive brands and its branding strategy, as well as a preview of an upcoming product line.

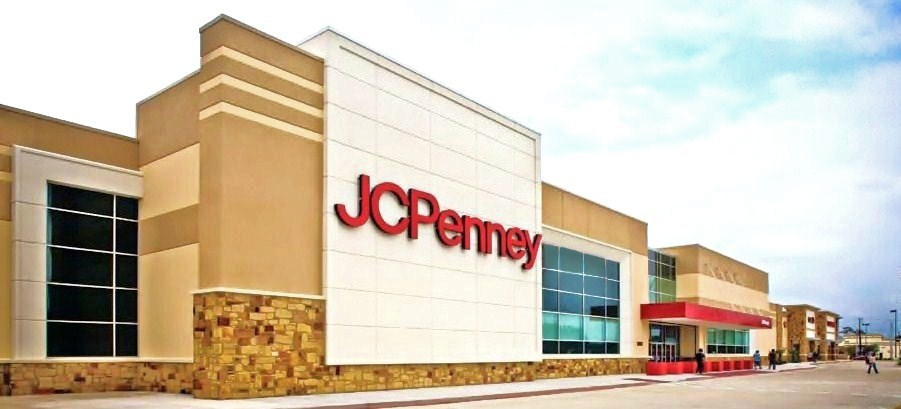
Exterior of the big-box format JCPenney store in Houston, Texas (2009)

In February 2008, the company launched the American Living brand, as developed by Ralph Lauren, across several product lines. The launch, which was accompanied by an ad campaign during the 80th Academy Awards, was the company's largest private brand launch. That summer, JCPenney also added a new brand to its home collection, Linden Street. The Linden Street brand features furniture, domestics, and home decor. Linden Street is sold exclusively in JCPenney stores and through its website. Other brands for juniors and young men were launched that summer. They included a relaunch of Le Tigre, along with Decree, and Fabulosity, a junior line of clothing by Kimora Lee Simmons.

In July 2009, new additions were made to the JCPenney young men's department, including an expansion of its private brand Decree (previously exclusively a juniors clothing line) and the introduction of more skate/surf-oriented clothing, including Rusty, RS by Ryan Sheckler and 3rd Rail. In August, Albert Gonzalez's defense lawyer announced JCPenney was a victim of a computer hacker, although the company stated that no customers' credit card information had been stolen. That year, JCPenney reached an agreement with Seattle's Best Coffee to feature full-service cafes within leased departments inside JCPenney stores across the country. Seattle's Best Coffee is still expanding café locations within JCPenney locations across the country.

=== 2010–2014 ===
In 2010, Vornado Realty Trust acquired a 9.9% stake in JCPenney but sold it in September 2013 for $13.00 per share.

==== JC's 5 Star Outlet ====
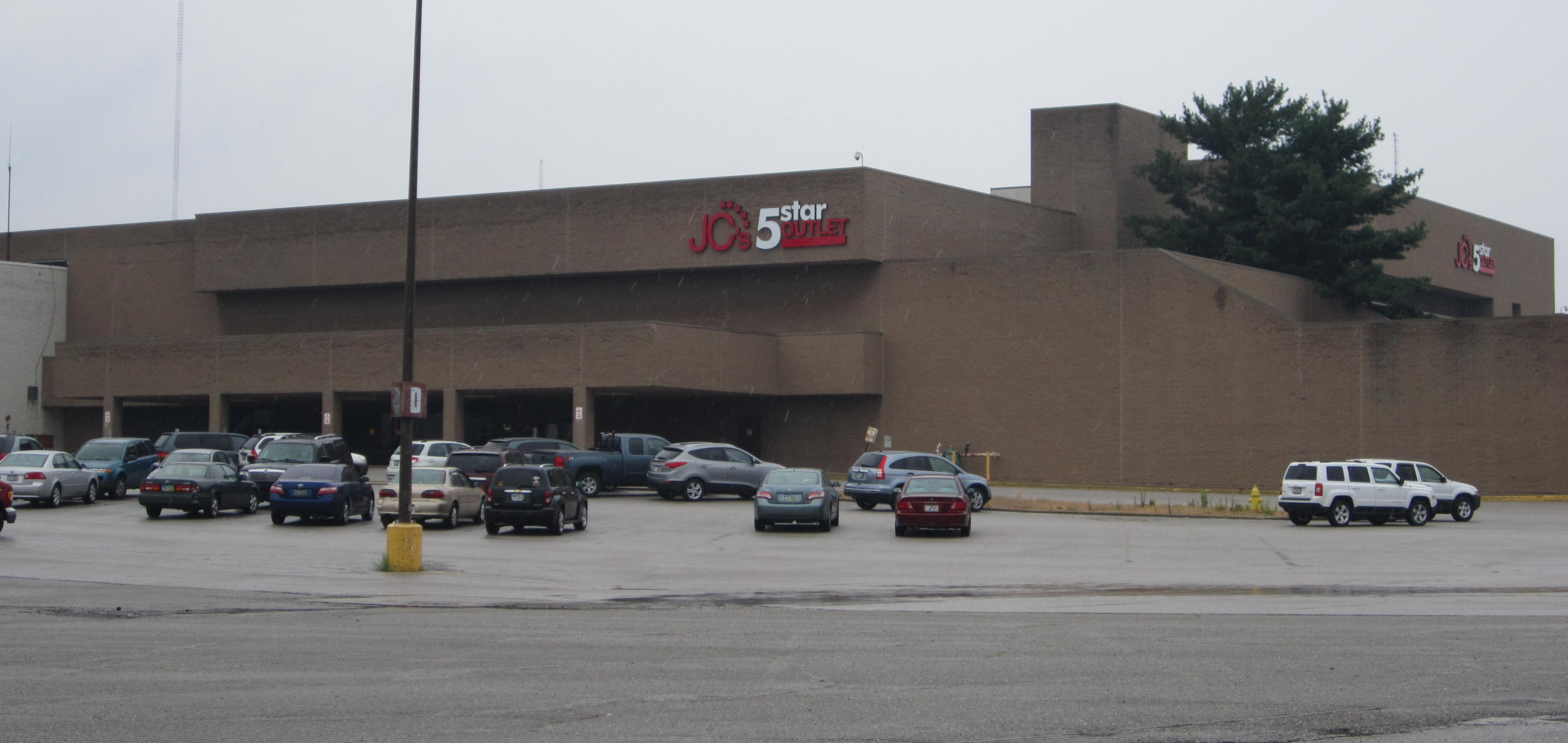
JC's 5 Star Outlet at the former Rolling Acres Mall in Akron, Ohio (July 2013)

On January 24, 2011, JCPenney shut down its catalog business and 19 outlet stores. Seven additional stores and two call centers also closed. On February 12, 2011, The New York Times revealed that JCPenney was using "spamdexing" techniques to manipulate Google search rankings. Google reduced the company's visibility, and JCPenney fired its search engine consultant.

In June 2011, Ron Johnson, former head of the Apple Store division, became JCPenney's CEO. That same year, the company sold its 15 remaining catalog outlets to SB Capital Group, a liquidation firm affiliated with Schottenstein Stores (the name behind DSW Designer Shoe Warehouse and Big Lots). They completed a corporate spin-off of the 15 remaining locations into JC's 5 Star Outlet. Only two JCPenney Outlet Store locations were converted into department stores: Potomac Mills in Woodbridge, Virginia and Franklin Mills (later Philadelphia Mills, now Franklin Mall) in Philadelphia, Pennsylvania (closed July 2017 as part of a nationwide plan to shut down 138 locations). The rebranding process from JCPenney Outlet Store to "JC's 5 Star Outlet" was gradual. The deal allowed the stores to continue using the "JCPenney Outlet Store" name for a 21-month transitional period. To ensure a smooth transition, SB Capital hired Glen Gammons, the former head of JCPenney's outlet division, to serve as CEO of the new company.

Under JCPenney, the outlets primarily sold the company's unsold catalog and store overstock. As JC's 5 Star Outlet, they continued to receive JCPenney merchandise but also began buying closeouts and liquidations from other brands to broaden their appeal. JC's 5 Star Outlet also had extreme discounts, selling items at 25% or 75% off regular retail prices. For its time, they continued to accept JCPenney credit cards, but stopped honoring gift cards from them. This transformation effort, however, was largely unsuccessful. On October 1, 2013, JC's 5 Star Outlet announced that it would permanently close all 15 locations in 14 states, with Glen Gammons citing a "precipitous decline of sales" and unsustainable losses. Locations held "Total Inventory Blowout" sales, liquidating approximately $70 million worth of merchandise before going out of business at the end of the year.

In December 2011, JCPenney purchased a 16.6% stake in Martha Stewart Living Omnimedia, intending to create "mini-Martha Stewart shops" in its stores by 2013. In early 2012, JCPenney implemented a new pricing strategy, replacing sales with "Every Day" prices, but saw a 22% sales decline by mid-year. The company also experienced staff cuts, laying off 1,600 employees in January and 600 more in April 2012. Johnson was dismissed in April 2013 and replaced by former CEO Mike Ullman.

In late 2013, JCPenney faced challenges in the stock market, issuing 84 million shares amid declining margins and a return to promotional pricing strategies.

=== 2015–2019 ===
In January 2015, it was announced that JCPenney would close 39 underperforming stores nationwide and lay off 2,250 employees. That same year, the company announced that it was liquidating its The Foundry Big & Tall Supply Co. chain of standalone clothing stores. In January 2016, JCPenney announced plans to relaunch its business of selling major appliances to target a wave of millennials who are buying first-time homes. In February, JCPenney opened a support center in Bangalore, India.

In January 2017, JCPenney sold its headquarters campus and surrounding land in Plano, Texas, to Dreien Opportunity Partners as a leaseback sale to maintain operations at the location. The land has since been broken up and sold and developed. Space inside the headquarters building has been subleased. Part of this land was sold to where the current Toyota North America headquarters is now located. In February, JCPenney announced that it would shutter two distribution centers and up to 140 under-performing stores as it wrestled with disappointing sales. The company also planned to offer buyouts to roughly 6,000 employees. On March 17, JCPenney released a list of 138 locations that would close by the end of June. By closing stores and distribution facilities, JCPenney would redirect resources to help expand its store-in-store Sephora boutiques, and add Nike and Adidas boutiques, similar to what Macy's has done with Finish Line, Lids and LensCrafters.

In an effort to capitalize on self-deprecating humor and improve its reputation, JCPenney collaborated with Nicole Richie and other designers to open a "Jacques Penne" pop-up shop in Manhattan during the 2017 holiday season.

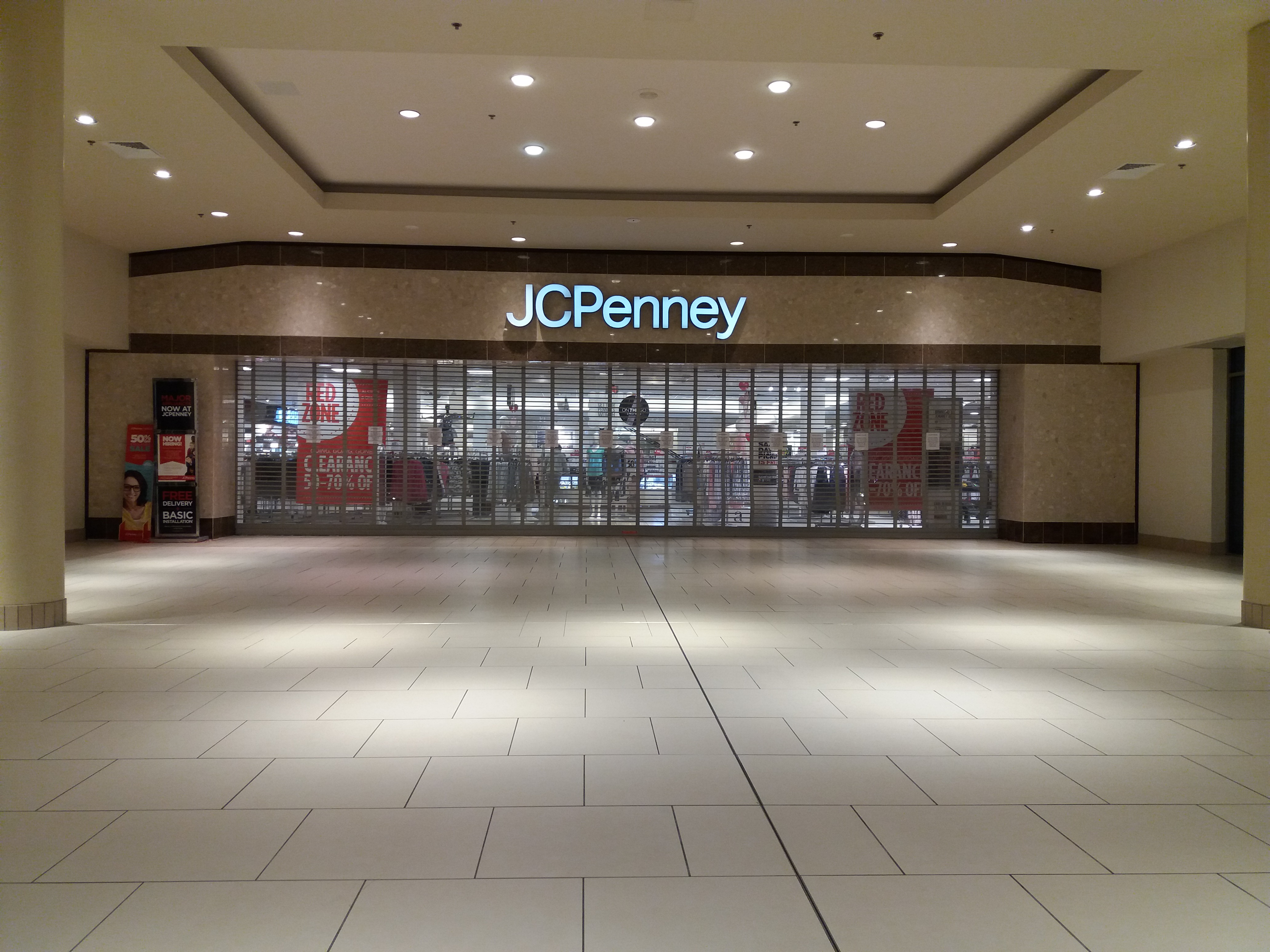
Mall entrance of the JCPenney store at Deptford Mall in Deptford Township, New Jersey, in 2018

In 2018, the JCPenney at Plaza Palma Real in Humacao, Puerto Rico closed permanently, after Hurricane Maria devastated the store in September 2017. In May, JCPenney reported an adjusted loss of $69 million in the first quarter, even worse than Wall Street predicted, and lowered its projections for the year. Sales fell 4%, also missing estimates. Earlier in 2018, the company announced it would cut 360 jobs at its stores and corporate headquarters. The company lowered its earnings forecast for the year to 13 cents per share at best, and said it could lose as much as 7 cents. JCPenney finished the quarter with just $181 million in cash, down from $363 million a year ago. Much of the big decrease was because of a $190 billion debt replace. On May 22, JCPenney announced the resignation of their CEO, Marvin Ellison. On October 2, JCPenney announced former Jo-Ann Stores CEO Jill Soltau as their CEO, effective October 15. With the announcement, JCPenney's shares rose 9%. The company ranked 235 on the Fortune 500 list of the largest United States corporations by revenue. She has also brought new talent and has cleaned out inventory. On December 26, the stock price of JCPenney (NYSE: JCP) fell below $1 per share. This was the first time ever that shares had fallen below $1 in the 110-year history of the company, which started trading on the New York Stock Exchange in 1929. The stock fell 68% over the course of 2018, including a 30% drop in December 2018 alone.

On February 6, 2019, JCPenney said it would stop selling major appliances on February 28, and that furniture would be limited to online and stores in Puerto Rico. On February 28, JCPenney announced its intent to close 27 stores in 2019, including 18 full-line department stores and nine home-and-furniture stores. The closure announcement was paired with news that the retailer had suffered a 4% decline in same-store sales during the 2018 holiday quarter. On March 26, JCPenney announced the hiring of Bill Wofford as chief financial officer. Wofford came to the company from The Vitamin Shoppe, where he had served as CFO since June 2018. On May 21, JCPenney announced that Shawn Gensch was appointed as executive vice president, chief customer officer, effective June 3. Gensch comes from Sprouts Farmers Market where he was their CCO. Also on May 21, JCPenney announced a net sales decline of 5.6% and a net loss of $154 million for its fiscal first quarter of 2019, which ended on May 5.

=== COVID and bankruptcy: 2020 ===
On January 19, 2020, JCPenney announced plans to close six stores.

==== COVID-19 pandemic ====
On March 15, 2020, when businesses were ordered to temporarily close in many states, the chain closed all of its stores and furloughed its employees. JCPenney became the fourth major national retailer to file for bankruptcy in May 2020. Days earlier, it was reported in a regulatory filing that JCPenney would give bonuses totaling nearly $10 million to the company's senior managers, which included $4.5 million to CEO Jill Soltau. After 91 years, it was delisted from the New York Stock Exchange on May 18, 2020, and started trading over-the-counter the following business day.

On March 18, JCPenney announced all retail stores would temporarily close in response to the global COVID-19 pandemic until April 2. On March 31, JCPenney announced an extension of the planned April 2 reopening, with a new date not possible to be determined at the time. On May 1, JCPenney announced a limited number of stores would reopen.

==== Bankruptcy and new ownership ====
On May 15, 2020, JCPenney filed for Chapter 11 bankruptcy and announced that there would be an additional 242 store closings, blaming the COVID-19 pandemic for its action. By June 17, JCPenney reopened approximately 827 stores; most of the 154 scheduled for permanent closure in 2020 were among those reopened, with final closing sales in progress. On June 22, JCPenney identified an additional 13 stores that would be permanently closed. On July 7, 2020, JCPenney announced that they would close two stores in New York City; one at the Manhattan Mall, which was closed immediately and the Kings Plaza store in Brooklyn, which closed on Sunday, September 27, 2020. On December 17, 2020, JCPenney announced that they would close 15 additional stores in March 2021. As of June 2021, there have been a total of 175 store closures. On December 30, 2020, it was announced that Jill Soltau would step down as CEO of JCPenney, effective December 31, 2020. It is unclear whether she was fired or resigned. On January 1, 2021, Soltau was replaced by Simon Property's chief investment officer, Stanley Shashoua.

On June 4, 2020, JCPenney released a list of 148 stores slated to close starting in late June 2020, with eleven additional store closures announced on June 22 and two additional stores on July 7, with the previously announced store closing locations remaining on hold pending further review, for a planned closing a total of 242 stores. Since the initial filing, rumors of potential buyers included Amazon, Sycamore Partners, and a group consisting of Authentic Brands (Forever 21, Aeropostale, Barneys), and mall owners Simon Property Group and Brookfield Properties. On July 8, JCPenney submitted their bankruptcy exit plan to existing lenders, and requested more time for negotiations. On July 31, 2020, it was announced that 21 stores, including the "Mother Store" in Kemmerer, Wyoming, would be auctioned off as part of the proceedings.

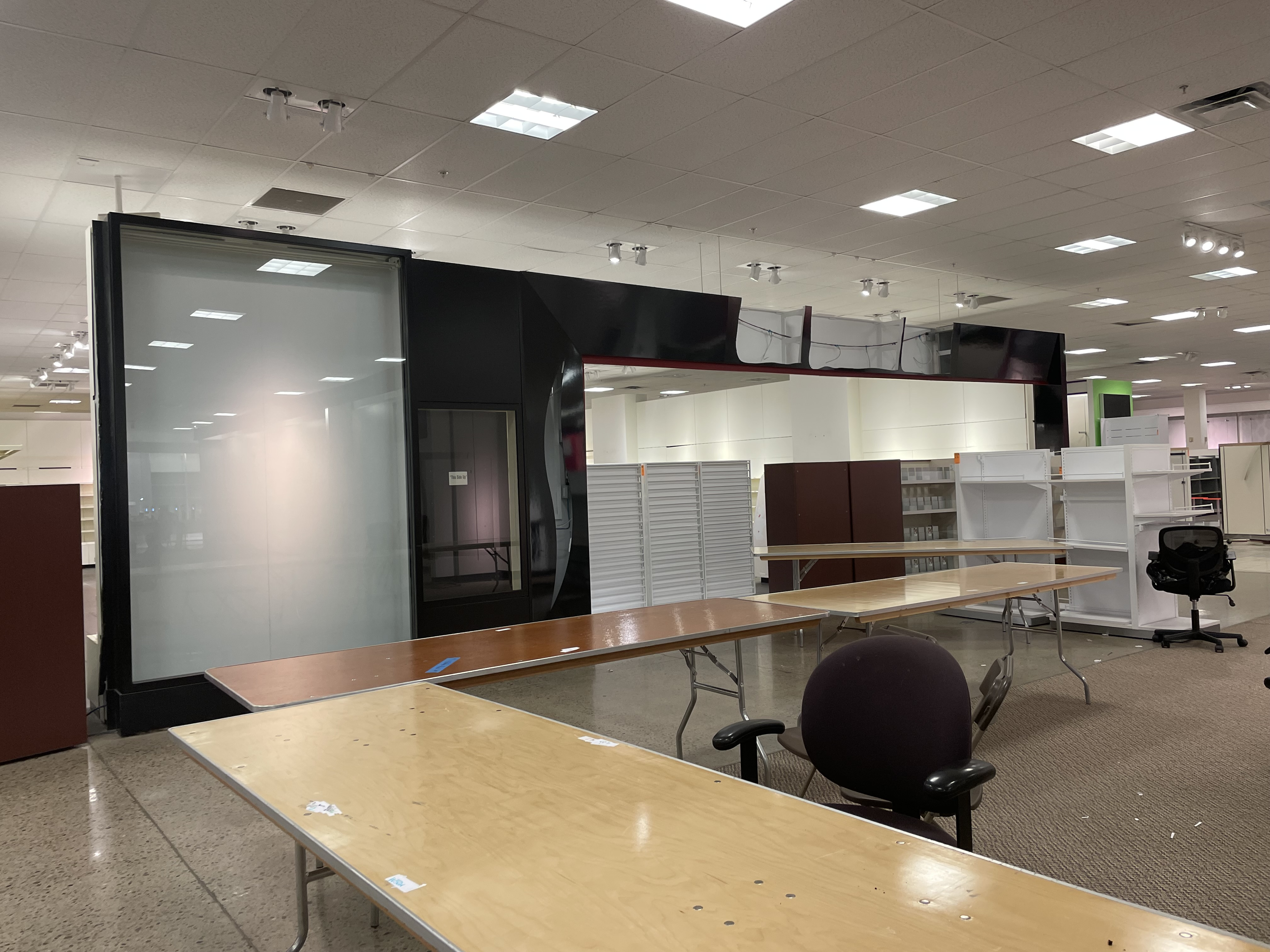
A former Sephora inside the now-closed JCPenney at Pittsburgh Mills in Tarentum, Pennsylvania

On September 9, 2020, Brookfield Property Partners and Simon Property Group agreed to purchase JCPenney for about $800 million, including $300 million in cash and assuming $500 million of debt, which was later approved by the court on November 10, 2020. It had been established that once the company emerges from bankruptcy it is poised to save nearly 60,000 jobs, according to various independent studies. The company was paying $2.45 million in monthly rent at the time it sold its headquarters offices in Plano, Texas in 2017; the location was permanently vacated in November 2020.

=== Under Simon and Brookfield: 2020–present ===
In October 2021, the company opened 10 new shop-in-shop locations across the US, featuring a wide variety of brands, including indie and BIPOC brands, among them flagship partner Thirteen Lune. Marc Rosen became CEO in 2021.

In April 2022, JCPenney's owners—Simon and Brookfield—offered $8.6 billion to purchase Kohl's. Sephora had already announced plans to contract exclusively with Kohl's by 2023, and had piloted Sephora Inside Kohls at select store locations. With this deal, Sephora would remain affiliated with, and under control of, the Simon and Brookfield retail portfolio, therefore superseding and annulling previous agreements for Sephora to leave JCPenney in favor of Kohl's. Kohl's ultimately withdrew from the deal after Franchise Group lowered their bid for the company after finding out that Kohl's had downgraded its outlook for the second fiscal quarter for the company as a result of "softer consumer spending amid decades-high inflation".

The company returned to its Plano, Texas, headquarters in July 2023. The reopened headquarters contains over 2,000 workers and occupies three floors.

In December 2025, JCPenney announced that they would close their location in Pleasanton, California, in February 2026. JCPenney store locations in Sanford, Florida and Springfield, Virginia closed in May 2026. Locations in Chicago and Goodlettsville, Tennessee closed in June 2026 as well as a location in Pittsburgh in September 2026 and a location in Franklin, Tennessee in October 2026. In addition, JCPenney announced that it will close a location in Fort Worth, Texas in November 2026.

== Finances ==
Year	Revenue in mil. US$	Net income in mil. US$	Total assets in mil. US$	Employees	Stores
2005	18,096	512	14,127	151,000	1,079
2006	18,781	1,088	12,461	151,000	1,019
2007	19,903	1,153	12,673	155,000	1,033
2008	19,860	1,111	14,309	155,000	1,067
2009	18,486	572	12,011	147,000	1,093
2010	17,556	251	12,581	154,000	1,108
2011	17,759	389	13,068	156,000	1,106
2012	17,260	−152	11,424	159,000	1,102
2013	12,985	−985	9,781	116,000	1,104
2014	11,859	−1,278	11,801	117,000	1,094
2015	12,257	−717	10,309	114,000	1,062
2016	12,625	−513	9,442	105,000	1,021
2017	12,547	1	9,118	106,000	1,013
2018	12,505	−116	8,413	98,000	872

== Corporate identity ==
=== Logo ===
Penney's logo used from 1963 to 1971 but still on stores until the 1980s

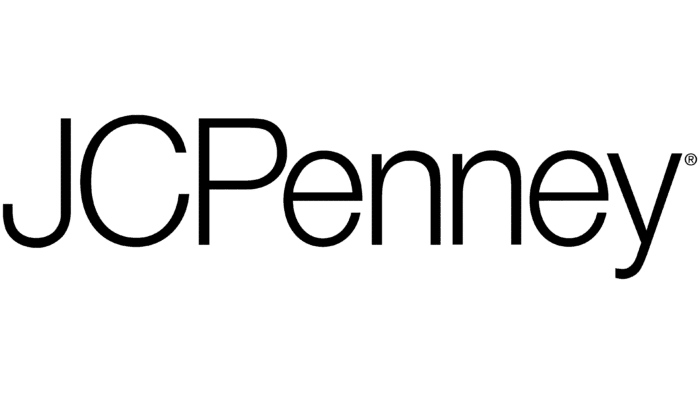
JCPenney logo 1971–2000

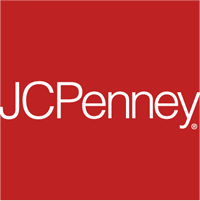
JCPenney box logo 2000–2005

Alternate JCPenney logo used on a few stores, used from 2011 until 2012

JCPenney logo used from 2012 to 2013

JCPenney logo used from November 1, 2019, to 2023

JCPenney logo used from 2008–2011, 2013–2019, and 2023–present

=== Private brands ===
Beginning with the Marathon Hats line, JCPenney has introduced multiple private brands, partially in response to suppliers denying access to expected inventories.

- Ambrielle (women's sleepwear, intimates, and swim)
- a.n.a. (juniors)
- Arizona (casual)
- Big Mac Men's Workwear (founded in 1922)
- Claiborne (men's; discontinued)
- Collection by Michael Strahan (men's formalwear)
- Cooks
- Croft & Barrow (founded in 1972; purchased by Kohl's in 2001)
- Foundry Supply Co. (discontinued solo stores; superseded by SJB and Arizona)
- Home Expressions
- J. Ferrar (men's)
- JCPenney Home
- Linden Street (bedding)
- Liz Claiborne (women's apparel)
- Loom + Forge (home)
- Marathon Hats (first JCP private brand)
- Marilyn Monroe (women's)
- Mutual Weave (men's denim and casual outerwear)
- North Pole Trading Co. (holiday)
- Okie Dokie (newborn and toddler)
- Ryegrass (women's)
- St. John's Bay (casual clothing and shoes for men and women)
- St. John's Bay Outdoor (men's outdoor apparel)
- Stafford (men's)
- ThereAbouts (children's)
- Worthington (women's)
- Xersion (active and athletic)

=== Former subsidiaries ===
- Eckerd Pharmacy – a chain of pharmacies that JCPenney sold off in 2004, with former locations becoming CVS or Rite Aid.
- The Treasury / Treasure Island – a chain of discount stores that JCPenney closed in the 1980s
- Treasury drug stores – a chain of stand-alone drug stores that were also branded with the Treasury nameplate. Treasury Drug stores became Eckerd which JCPenney also owned.
- JCPenney Insurance – JCPenney Casualty Insurance (also referred to as Penney-Wise Protection) was sold to Metropolitan Life Insurance Company in 1989.
- Auto Centers – JCPenney had Auto Centers during the 1960s through early 1980s. The free-standing JCPenney Auto Centers had gas stations. JCPenney closed the Auto Centers in 1983 with the free-standing Auto Centers being sold to Firestone and the store attached Auto Centers becoming additional store and warehouse space.
- JCPenney Home Stores – stores that sold linens & home decor
- JCPenney Outlet / JC's 5 Star Outlet – JCPenney Outlet Stores were stores that sold JCPenney's merchandise at a lower outlet store price. JC's 5 Star Outlet was a "lower rank" outlet store. All of the outlet stores were closed by the end of 2013.
- JCPenney furniture outlet – JCPenney outlet stores that only sold furniture and rugs.
- JCPenney Restaurants – some stores had JCPenney-branded restaurants
- Penncraft Tools – a short-lived line of tools intended to compete with Sears Craftsman, with hand tools manufactured by New Britain and power tools and drill bits manufactured by Stanley.

== Locations listed on the National Register of Historic Places ==
JCPenney locations that are listed on the National Register of Historic Places (NRHP):

- J. C. Penney–Chicago Store Building (Tucson, Arizona)
- J. C. Penney Company Building (Shoshone, Idaho)
- J. C. Penney Co. Warehouse Building (St. Louis, Missouri)
- J. C. Penney Building (Newberg, Oregon)
- J. C. Penney Historic District, Kemmerer, Wyoming, a National Historic Landmark District
- J. C. Penney House, Kemmerer, Wyoming

== See also ==
- Retail apocalypse
- Sears
