= US Vision =

American eyeglasses company

U.S. Vision, Inc.
- Company type: Subsidiary
- Industry: Retail
- Founded: 1885; major expansion of business in 1972 (Philadelphia, Pennsylvania)
- Headquarters: Blackwood, New Jersey, U.S.
- Products: Eyewear, Contact Lenses
- Parent: Refac Optical Group
- Website: www.usvision.com

U.S. Vision, a wholly owned subsidiary of Refac Optical Group, is an international optometric dispensary chain. The vast majority of these locations are leased spaces in large department stores, such as JCPenney, Boscov's and Meijer as well as AAFES, Military Exchanges. As of February 28, 2021 the Company had 373 locations in 44 states, consisting of licensed departments and freestanding stores. U.S. Vision deals mainly in prescription eyewear, contact lenses, and optometry offices.

== History ==
In 1885, Charles Wall and William Ochs opened a retail optical store in Philadelphia, Pennsylvania, that is still in operation today. With this as a beginning, other optical locations were purchased, starting the first optical store chain in the United States. In the early 1970s, the company purchased Wall and Ochs, combined it with a manufacturing facility in Blackwood, New Jersey, and named the new combination of manufacturing and sales U.S. Vision.

== Location names ==
U.S. Vision, being a parent company, is known under many different names throughout the U.S. and Canada. Primarily operating out of leased areas in large department stores such as JCPenney and Boscov's, and named by simply adding Optical to the host store's name (exp: J.C. Penney Optical, Boscov's Optical).
