= J. C. Penney Building (Newberg, Oregon) =

- J.C. Penney Building
- U.S. National Register of Historic Places
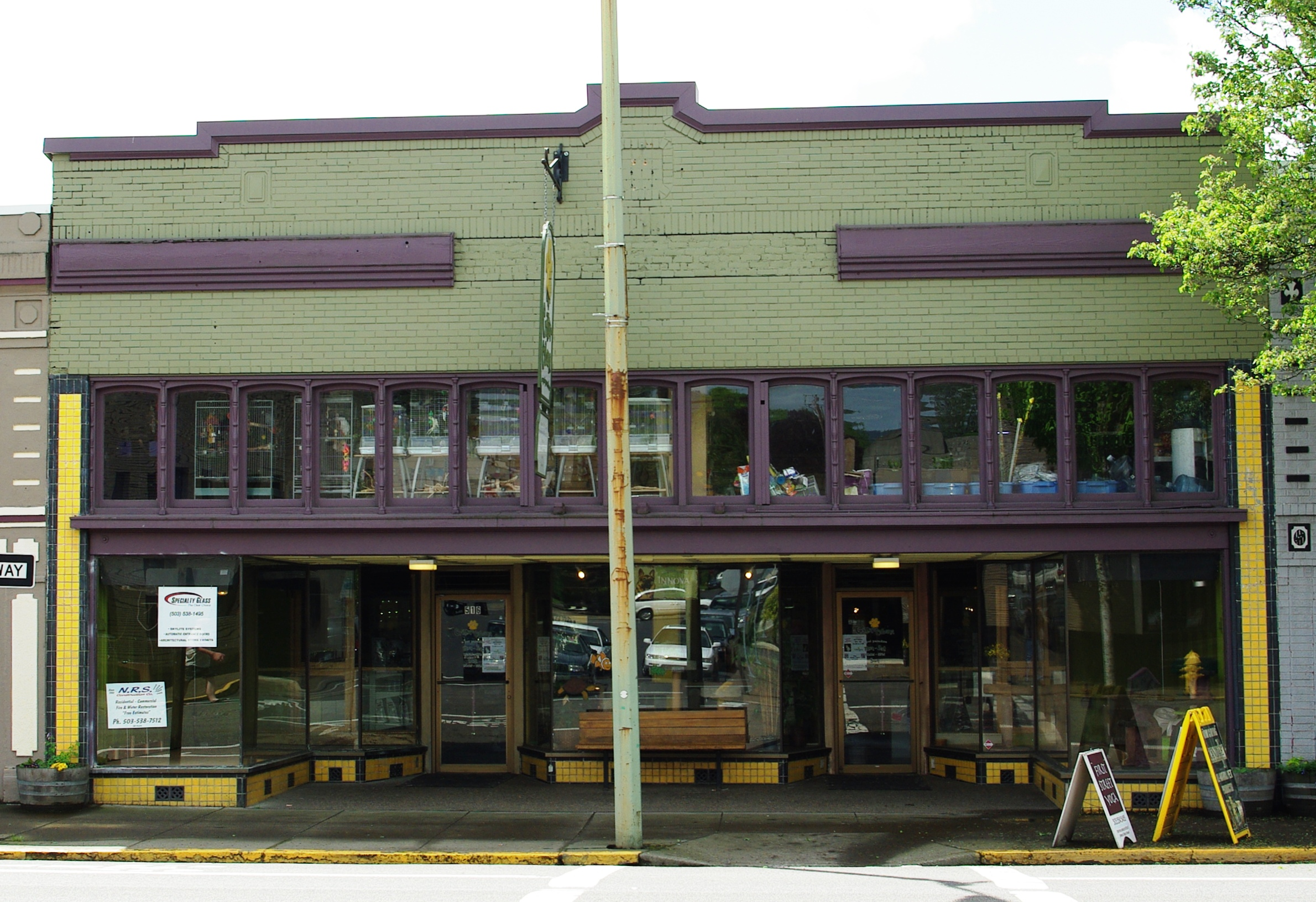
- Building in 2009
- Location: 516 E 1st Street; Newberg, Oregon
- Coordinates: 45°18′00″N 122°58′27″W
- Built: c. 1927
- NRHP reference No.: 07000555
- Added to NRHP: June 13, 2007

The J. C. Penney Building is a former department store building in downtown Newberg, Oregon, United States.

== History ==
Built around 1927, the structure was added to the National Register of Historic Places on June 13, 2007. The brick building is 1-and-a-half stories tall.

== See also ==
- J. C. Penney
