= Jill Soltau =

American business executive and CEO of JCPenney

- Born: 1967; Viroqua, Wisconsin
- Education: University of Wisconsin–Stout
- Known for: Former CEO of JCPenney

Jill Ann Soltau (born 1967) is an American businesswoman who was the CEO of JCPenney from October 2018 through December 2020. She was previously CEO of Jo-Ann Fabrics.

== Education ==
A native of Viroqua, Wisconsin, Soltau is a 1989 graduate of University of Wisconsin–Stout’s retail merchandising and management undergraduate program.

== Career ==
Jill Soltau started her career at Carson Pirie Scott before moving into senior level positions at Sears and Kohl's. In 2007, she joined Shopko where she served in various roles before becoming president of the company in 2013.

Soltau became CEO and president of Jo-Ann Fabrics on March 2, 2015. As CEO, she opposed President Trump's tariffs on Chinese goods and testified in front of the administration in opposition due to American manufacturers not being able to meet Jo-Ann's quality or volume needs.

On October 15, 2018, Soltau began as CEO and a member of the board of JCPenney following Marvin Ellison's departure and the decline of the struggling company. She was the 25th woman leading a Fortune 500 company at the time, Penney's fifth chief executive in the past decade and first woman executive. Soltau was faced with an uphill battle to revitalize a brand that had lost customer confidence. Soltau moved to close stores, exit the appliance market, remodel fitting rooms and introduce workshops for customers. Under her leadership in 2019, the company was scheduled to close dozens of stores after shifting its focus to home goods and women's clothes. Some criticized the slow approach pointing out that the slow approach might have been as dangerous as the previous CEO's quick approach She had also brought in new talent and has cleaned out inventory. On December 30, 2020, it was announced that Soltau would step down as CEO of JCPenney, effective December 31, 2020.

== Controversy ==
On May 14, 2020, after layoffs and furloughs of more than 80,000 employees and missing two payments on J.C. Penney debt, it was reported that Jill Soltau would receive a $4.5 million bonus.
