= Arizona Jean Co. =

American clothing company

The Original Arizona Jean Company, known as Arizona Jean Co or Arizona Jeans, is an American clothing company that manufactures jeans and other related clothing items. Initially preceded by JCPenney's 1970s Plain Pockets jeans line, Arizona Jean Company was founded as a private label of JCPenney in 1990.

== History ==
Arizona Jean Co. originated as a JCPenney private label brand, first introduced in 1990 as part of the retailer's strategic shift toward fashion-focused in-house brands. The brand was developed to offer consumers accessible and stylish denim at value-focused price points, positioning itself as a proprietary alternative to national denim brands. Arizona Jean Co.'s launch succeeded JCPenney's Plain Pockets line from the 1970s.

Arizona Jean Co. quickly became one of JCPenney's most successful private labels, achieving substantial sales growth throughout the early 1990s. Retail earnings for the Arizona brand soared from $90 million in its launch year to approximately $400 million by 1993. Its growing popularity led to the rapid expansion of the product line, including a wider variety of jean designs, sizes, and colors. By the mid-1990s, Arizona Jean Co. was generating approximately $1 billion in annual sales for JCPenney, marking it as a major driver of both revenue and customer loyalty, and influencing competitors such as Sears to introduce proprietary denim lines in response.
