= J. C. Penney–Chicago Store Building =

- U.S. National Register of Historic Places
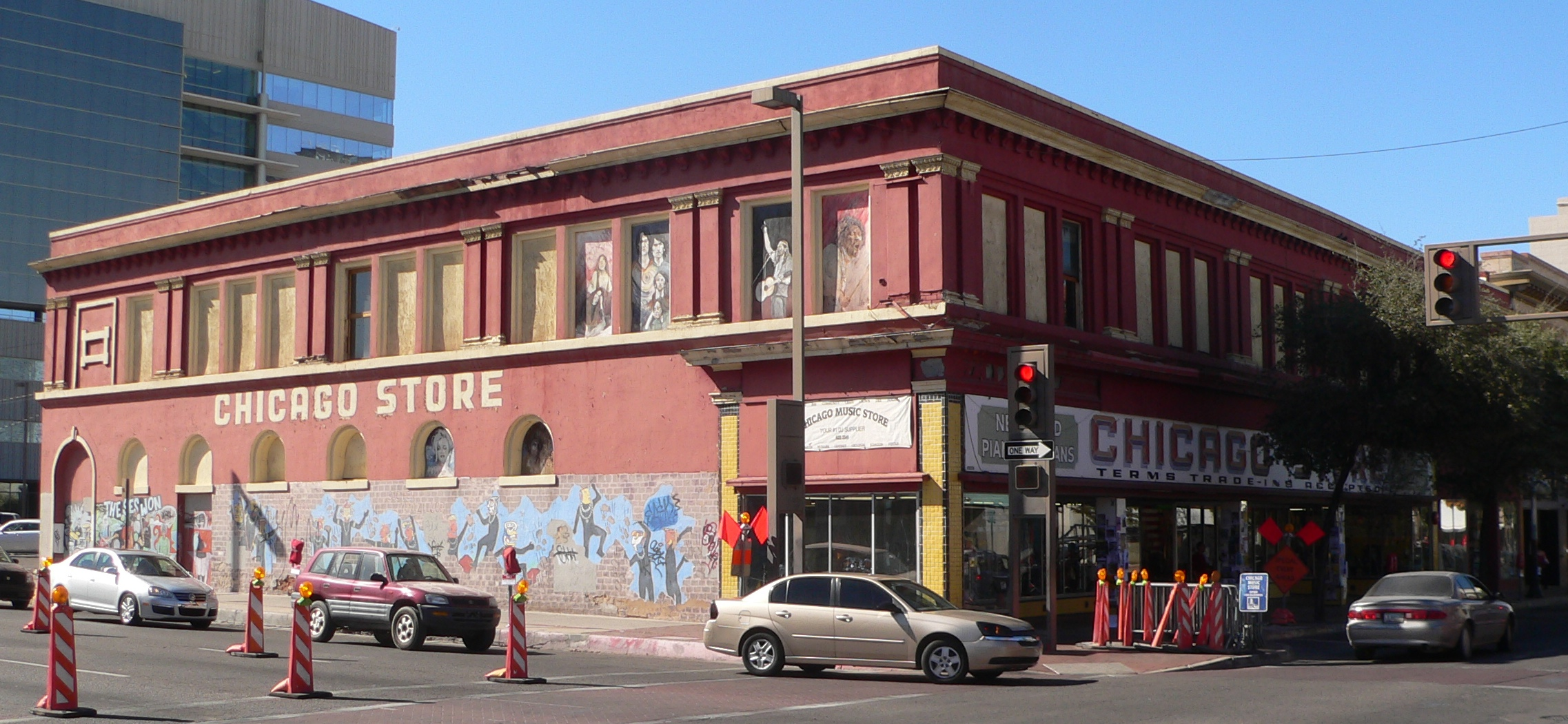
- Chicago Store seen from the northeast, across intersection of Congress Street and 6th Avenue
- Location: 130 East Congress Street, Tucson, Arizona
- Coordinates: 32.2217°N 110.9689°W
- Area: 26, 400 ft.^{2}
- Built: 1903
- Architects: Holmes, D.H.
- Architectural style: Italianate
- NRHP reference No.: 03000907
- Added to NRHP: 2003-09-12

The J. C. Penney–Chicago Store is a historic department store building in downtown Tucson, Arizona, United States. Built in 1903 for the Los Angeles Furniture Co, it housed J. C. Penney by July 25, 1942. In 1957, after J. C. Penney moved to the west side of Stone Avenue just north of Pennington Street, Aaronson Brothers moved in. The Chicago Store moved in after the El Paso-based department store closed in 1967. This building had the last complete original vintage interior in Downtown Tucson with stamped tin ceilings and period woodwork until it was completely gutted in 2020–2022.
