= JoAnn Fabrics =

American arts and crafts retail chain (1943–2025)

Jo-Ann Stores, LLC
- Final logo used from 2017 to 2025

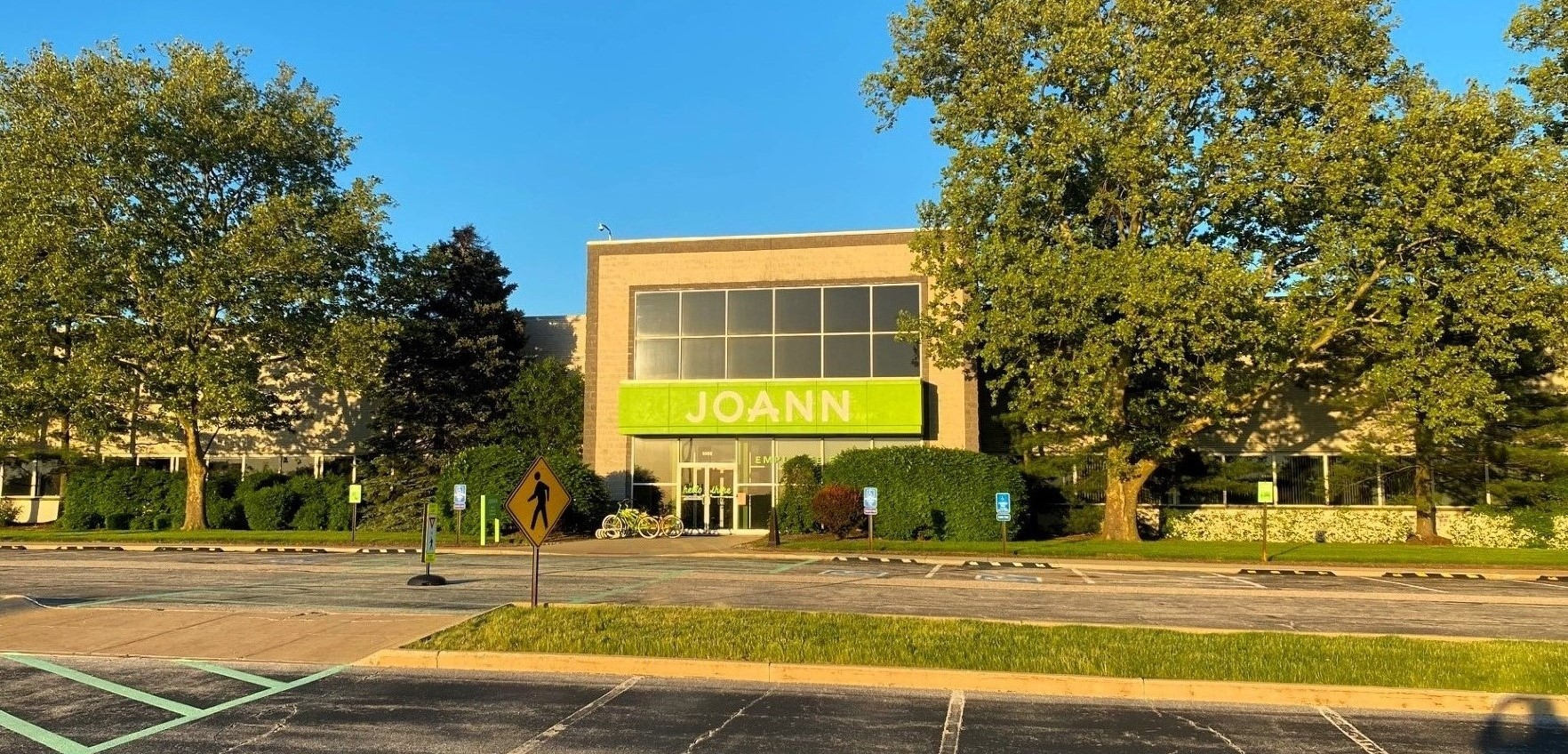
- JOANN's former headquarters in Hudson, Ohio.
- Trade name: JOANN
- Formerly: Cleveland Fabric Shop (1943–1963); Fabri-Centers (1963–1998)
- Type: Private
- Traded as: Nasdaq: JOAN
- Industry: Retail
- Founded: 1943; 83 years ago in Cleveland, Ohio, U.S.
- Founders: Hilda Reich; Berthold Reich; Justin Zimmerman; Alma Zimmerman; Sigmund Rohrbach; Mathilda Rohrbach
- Defunct: May 30, 2025; 17 months ago
- Fate: Chapter 11 bankruptcy and liquidation
- Successor: Michaels (website only)
- Headquarters: 5555 Darrow Road, Hudson, Ohio, United States
- Number of locations: 855 (2018); 790 (prior to company-wide shutdown in 2025)
- Key people: Scott Secella; Chris DiTullio (CEO)
- Products: Crafts and fabrics
- Revenue: ▲US$2.7 billion (2021)
- Operating income: ▲US$154 million (2021)
- Net income: ▲US$212 million (2021)
- Total assets: US$2.254 billion (2021)
- Total equity: ▲US$1.366 billion (2021)
- Number of employees: 23,000 (2021)
- Website: joann.com (archived January 2025)

Jo-Ann Stores, LLC, (stylized JOANN) was an American specialty retail chain that specialized in fabrics and arts and crafts supplies. The chain was based in Hudson, Ohio and operated over 800 stores across 49 U.S. states. By the end of February 2025, the company began the process of liquidating all of its stores after failing to obtain a buyer. Two hundred fifty-five of the chain's stores were shuttered by the end of April, while the remaining 535 locations were permanently closed by May 30, 2025. Arts and crafts retailer Michaels acquired Joann's intellectual property and private labels, but none of its physical stores.

== History ==
=== Origin ===
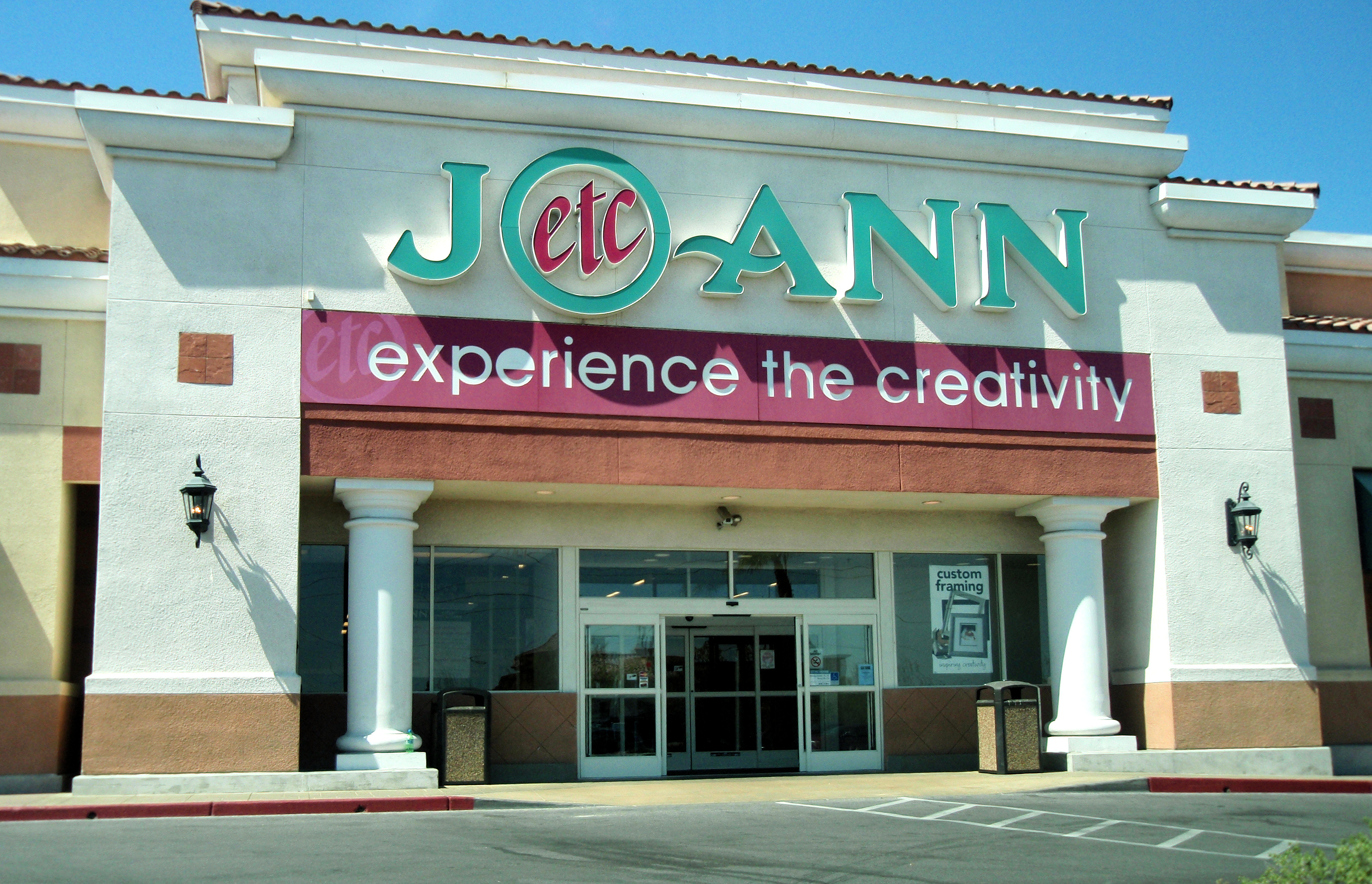
Older Jo-Ann store in Henderson, Nevada, as shown in 2008

German immigrants Hilda and Berthold Reich, Sigmund and Mathilda Rohrbach, and Justin and Alma Zimmerman opened the Cleveland Fabric Shop in Cleveland, Ohio in 1943. After further expansion, the store's name was changed to Jo-Ann Fabrics in 1963. The store's name was created by combining the names of the daughters from both families: Joan and Jacqueline Ann.

Jo-Ann Fabrics became a publicly held corporation traded on the American Stock Exchange under the name of Fabri-Centers of America, Inc. in 1969. The company made its first acquisition with the purchase of Cloth World, a 342-store southern company, in 1994. At the time of the acquisition, Fabri-Centers operated 655 stores.

In 1997, Fabri-Centers settled for $3.3 million on federal charges that it had misled investors in 1992 by overstating its earnings before it sold securities. CEO Alan D. Rosskamm, grandson of Hilda and Berthold Reich, settled a related administrative complaint as well.

Fabri-Centers acquired House of Fabrics, which also previously operated as Fabricland, Fabric King, and So-Fro Fabrics, in 1998. In September 1998, the company changed its name to Jo-Ann Stores Inc., and all of its stores were renamed Jo-Ann Fabrics.

Darrell Webb became chairman and CEO of Jo-Ann Fabrics in March 2006.

Jo-Ann Stores announced plans to sell out to private equity firm Leonard Green & Partners for $1.6 billion on March 23, 2010, and was delisted from the stock exchange in March 2011. Darrell Webb resigned in March 2011 and Travis Smith was promoted to CEO after joining the company in March 2006. Travis Smith announced his resignation in March 2014. The company's CFO, Jim Kerr, agreed to become CEO until a replacement was found.

Jo-Ann stores named Jill Soltau as president, chief executive officer and a member of the company board of directors in March 2015. Under Soltau's leadership, the retailer opposed President Trump's tariffs citing American manufacturers not being able to meet Jo-Ann's quality or volume needs. She joined seven other retail CEOs at a meeting with the administration where they discussed how the tariff would raise consumer prices and hurt businesses. Jo-Ann Stores rebranded to Joann in March 2018 as a way to move beyond fabrics and encompass more craft.

Soltau left Jo-Ann Stores in March 2018. Wade Miquelon became president, CEO, and a member of the board of directors in March 2019.

In March 2019, Jo-Ann partnered with GoldieBlox for a monthly subscription box called the GoldieBlox Box to help children ages 8 and up to develop STEM skills.

=== COVID-19 pandemic ===
Prior to the COVID-19 pandemic, the chain lost $546.6M in its 2019 fiscal year. However, by the end of the 2020 fiscal year, it made $210.9M to $212.9M and added 9 million new customers. The increase in sales is credited to mask mandates and an increased interest in do-it-yourself projects. In March 2021, Jo-Ann made plans to create an e-commerce facility in West Jefferson, Ohio to better serve its online sales.

On March 16, 2021, Jo-Ann went public on the Nasdaq stock exchange under the ticker symbol JOAN. Leonard Green & Partners retained a majority stake in the company, allowing it to nominate up to five members of the board of directors.

==== COVID-19 lockdown controversy ====
During the COVID-19 pandemic, Jo-Ann received public criticism for keeping many of their stores open amidst health concerns for elderly customers and refusing paid sick leave for employees affected by COVID-19. Jo-Ann defended themselves in a statement by claiming that their free mask kits helped local hospitals, which allowed the stores to be considered "essential business", despite many hospitals rejecting homemade masks. Michigan's governor, Gretchen Whitmer, forced stores to close down in the state after Jo-Ann sent a letter requesting to not be included in stay-at-home orders. Whitmer stressed that the same materials used to create masks are able to be sold online without in-person contact. Most of the materials used in the free mask kits were later revealed to be remnants which were often sold by Jo-Ann at a discount, leading some media outlets to disparage the program as "just scraps from the clearance bin".

=== Bankruptcies and liquidation ===
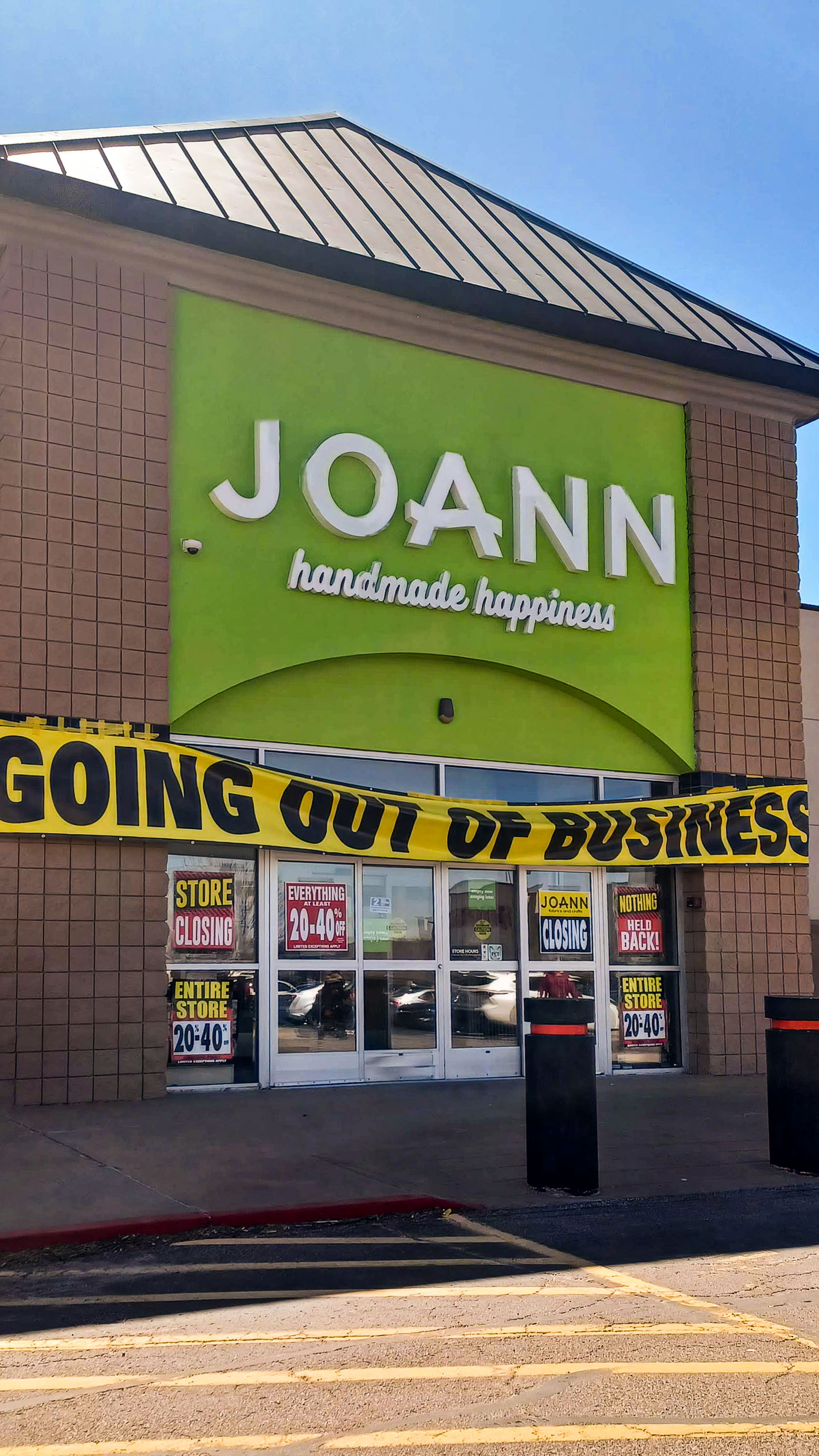
A Joann store with a going out of business sign in Oklahoma City.

In September 2023, Jo-Ann announced it would lay off an unspecified number of administrative employees. In October 2023, Fitch Ratings and CreditRiskMonitor reported that Joann was nearing a potential Chapter 11 bankruptcy filing. That month, Joann was handed a delisting notice from Nasdaq as its stock share price fell below $1 per share that stated that if Joann was unable to get its shares up to $1 or above, its stock would be delisted from the Nasdaq.

Jo-Ann filed for Chapter 11 bankruptcy protection on March 18, 2024. The company planned to cut over $500 million in debt and restructure into a privately held company. It planned to complete its filing by late April with no employees or stores affected. Nasdaq halted the trading of the company's stock on March 28, and on April 9, Jo-Ann was formally delisted from the exchange. The company's reorganization plan was approved by a federal judge on April 25, and Jo-Ann emerged from bankruptcy as a private company.

On January 15, 2025, Joann filed for Chapter 11 bankruptcy protection for the second time in less than a year. The company cited continued declining sales as a contribution to its second filing. Stores were expected to remain open throughout the procedure as the company attempted to shed its debt by $500 million.

On February 12, 2025, Joann announced the closure of 500 of its remaining 800 locations, in an effort to "right-size" the company's footprint. 61 of the locations slated for closure were in California, while Florida, Michigan, Ohio, and Pennsylvania each saw more than 30 Jo-Ann locations close. On February 24, 2025, it was announced that Joann would liquidate the remaining 300 locations after failing to find a buyer. Its assets were sold to GA Group, a private equity firm. The last Jo-Ann stores closed on May 30, 2025.

On June 5, 2025, a few days after the last store closed its doors, it was announced that arts and crafts retailer Michaels had acquired Joann's intellectual property and private labels, but none of its physical stores. Michaels itself has plans to expand its selection of products by introducing Joann's private labels to physical stores and online within the coming months. An increase in fabric searches on Michaels' website prompted the company to move forward with this decision.
