= Louise Trotter =

Fashion designer (born 1969)

- Born: Sunderland, England
- Education: Northumbria University, Newcastle
- Occupation: Fashion designer
- Labels: Bottega Veneta (from Jan. 2025); Carven (Feb. 2023－Jan. 2025); Lacoste (Oct. 2018－Feb. 2023); Joseph (2009–2018)

Louise Trotter is an English fashion designer who has been the creative director of fashion brand Bottega Veneta since 2025. She previously worked for numerous clothing stores, retail chains, and fashion brands.

== Early life ==
Born in Sunderland, in England, Trotter studied fashion at the Northumbria University of Newcastle, where she graduated in 1991.

== Career ==
Trotter started working at Whistles in London and was promoted to Creative Director.

Trotter then relocated to New York City to become Head of Womenswear at PVH brand Calvin Klein. She subsequently worked as Vice-President of Womenswear Design at Gap, and before becoming SVP Creative Director at another PVH brand, Tommy Hilfiger.

Trotter then moved back to the United Kingdom to take over the role of Creative Director at Jigsaw.

In 2009 Trotter debuted as Creative Director for Joseph, where she remained for more than 9 years, until 2018.

In 2018 she became creative director of Lacoste.

In February 2023, Trotter took over the creative direction of Carven after leaving Lacoste at the beginning of the same year.

On 12 December 2024, Carven and Kering announced her withdrawal from Carven direction and her debut as creative director for Bottega Veneta, starting from January 2025.

== Recognition ==
In 2019, Trotter was awarded an Honorary Doctor of Civil Law Degree by Northumbria University.

== Personal life ==
Trotter is married to Japanese photographer Yuske Tanaka, with whom she has three children.
