= Bottega Veneta =

Italian luxury fashion house

Bottega Veneta S.r.l

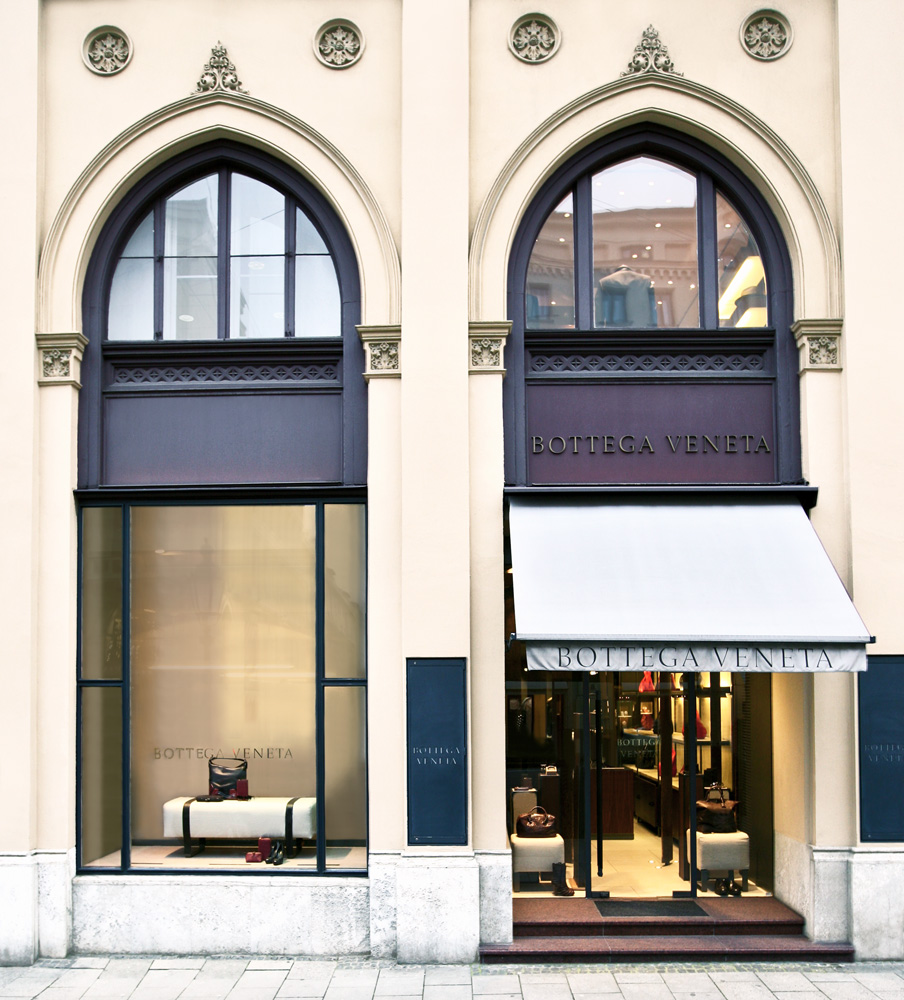
- Bottega Veneta boutique in Munich
- Type: Subsidiary
- Industry: Fashion
- Founded: 1966 (60 years ago) in Vicenza, Veneto, Italy
- Founder: Michele Taddei; Renzo Zengiaro
- Headquarters: Via Privata Ercole Marelli, 6 20139 Milan, Lombardy, Italy; 45.44299°N 9.20102°E
- Number of locations: 307 worldwide (2025)
- Area served: Worldwide
- Key people: Bartolomeo Rongone (CEO); Louise Trotter (creative director)
- Products: Haute couture; ready-to-wear; handbags; shoes; accessories; jewelry; fragrances
- Revenue: €1.7 billion (2024)
- Parent: Kering
- Website: bottegaveneta.com

Bottega Veneta S.r.l (pronounced [botˈteːɡa ˈvɛːneta]; Italian for 'Venetian Boutique') is an Italian luxury fashion house based in Milan, Italy. The house produces haute couture, ready-to-wear, handbags, shoes, accessories, jewellery and fragrances.

Bottega Veneta is headquartered in Milan, with its main atelier located in Montebello, near Vicenza. Bartolomeo Rongone has been CEO of Bottega Veneta since 2019, and Louise Trotter creative director since 2024. In 2024, Bottega Veneta's revenue reached 1.7 billion euros.

== History ==
=== Foundation (1966–2001) ===
Bottega Veneta was established in 1966 in Vicenza by Michele Taddei and Renzo Zengiaro. Specialized in artisanal leather goods, the brand developed a distinctive leather weaving technique, the Intrecciato, which became Bottega Veneta's signature look. This intricate method involves weaving strips of leather through slits in another piece of leather to create a durable and flexible textile. The technique enhances the strength of the leather and adds a unique aesthetic appeal to their products. This weaving technique has become synonymous with the brand. In 1972, Bottega Veneta opened its first store in the United States, in New York City. In the mid-1970s, the company started to make shoes.

Renzo Zengiaro left the company at the end of the 1970s. Soon after, Michele Taddei handed over the company to his ex-wife Laura Braggion, who headed the company with her second husband Vittorio Moltedo from then on. A 1978 two-page ad for Bottega Veneta - created by Andy Warhol and published in the magazine Interview - introduced the brand's tagline "When your own initials are enough". In 1980, the actress Lauren Hutton carried a Bottega Veneta Intrecciato bag in the movie American Gigolo while portraying the wife of a prominent politician. In 1985, Andy Warhol made the short film Bottega Veneta Industrial Videotape.

During the 1990s, Bottega Veneta launched its first ready-to-wear collection. From 1995 to 2001 the head designer of Bottega Veneta was Edward Buchanan. He designed the first ready-to-wear collection and the first show was held in Milan in 1998.

=== Modernization (2001–2018) ===
In February 2001, Gucci acquired Bottega Veneta for $156 million. Patrizio di Marco was appointed CEO and Tomas Maier creative director. In 2002, the brand launched a fashion jewelry line, followed by a fine jewelry line in 2006. By 2005, the company was profitable once again. Bottega Veneta launched a women's ready-to-wear collection in February 2005 and a menswear collection in June 2006. In January 2009, Marco Bizzarri succeeded to Patrizio di Marco as CEO of Bottega Veneta. In June 2011, Bottega Veneta launched its first women's fragrance Eau de Parfum. From 2001 to 2010, Bottega Veneta's sales grew 15-fold and reached the $1 billion mark in 2012. Vogue coined the term "stealth wealth" to describe the brand's style.

In 2013, Bottega Veneta moved its atelier from Vicenza to a historic 18th-century villa surrounded by a 590,000-square-foot park near Montebello Vicentino. The renovation of the property underwent a strict environmental process. Bottega Veneta also opened its first flagship store, an 11,448 square-foot boutique in a historic building on Via Sant'Andrea in Milan. In April 2014, Marco Bizzarri stepped down as CEO of Bottega Veneta, and Carlo Alberto Beretta became the company's new CEO in January 2015. In 2016, the brand's second flagship store opened on North Rodeo Drive in Beverly Hills. The company announced it would unify its men and women's shows. During the company's 50th anniversary show at the Accademia di Brera, the Bottega Veneta clutch bag carried by Lauren Hutton in the 1980 movie American Gigolo was revived (and renamed The Lauren 1980). In October 2016, Claus-Dietrich Lahrs was appointed CEO of Bottega Veneta. In 2018, Bottega Veneta opened a six floor flagship store in Ginza, Tokyo, in a building designed as a tribute to the capital's architectural modernism. In January 2018, Bottega Veneta opened a 15,000-square-foot store—its third flagship store—on the corner of Madison and 64th Street in the Upper East Side of New York City. In June 2018, Tomas Maier stepped down as creative director of Bottega Veneta.

=== Renewal (since 2018) ===
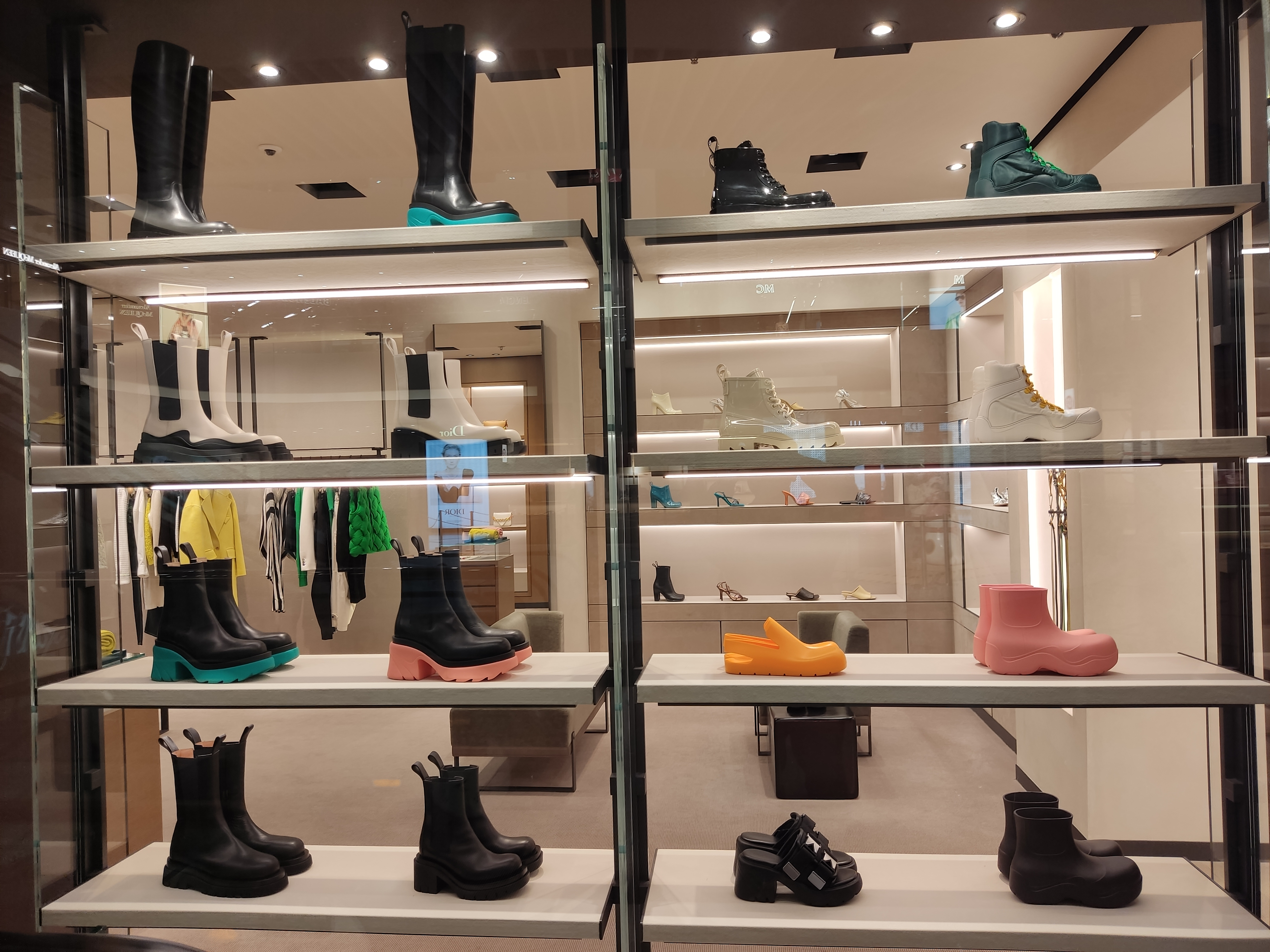
Bottega Veneta window display

Daniel Lee was appointed as creative director of Bottega Veneta in June 2018 and Bartolomeo Rongone as CEO in June 2019. In November 2019, Bottega Veneta opened its first store in Miami. In 2019, Bottega Veneta won four awards during the British Fashion Awards. On 2021, Bottega Veneta shut down its social media accounts and created the digital journal Issued by Bottega to communicate with clients, artists, collaborators, and fans. Monthly fashion shows were replaced by private staged trunk shows called Salons with industrial setups and guest performers. In April 2021, the Berlin police investigated Bottega Veneta's Salon after party following the show held at Berghain pursuant to social distancing and masking laws during the COVID-19 pandemic. On 10 November 2021, Daniel Lee left his post as creative director.

In late 2021, Kering appointed Matthieu Blazy, former design director at Bottega Veneta, as the new creative director of the company. Under Blazy, Bottega Veneta returned to the Milan Fashion Show. Blazy brought an inclusive management style, shrank the design team, and got the craftspeople involved in the creative process. He introduced the trompe-l'œil denim leather pants (2021), the intrecciato-woven handbags Kalimero (2022) and Andiamo (2023), and the knitted leather sock-slippers (2023). He was dubbed the "Magician of Milan" by Vanessa Friedman. In September 2023, the brand opened its flagship store in Paris on avenue Montaigne, the first designed by Blazy. In February 2024, the brand opened its third store in Milan, in the historic Galleria Vittorio Emanuele II. Later in June, Bottega opened a new store at the Rosewood Miramar Beach, a five-star hotel in Montecito.

In December 2024, Bottega Veneta announced Matthieu Blazy's departure and the hiring of Louise Trotter as the next creative director of the company. Previously, Trotter was creative director at French label- Carven by Marie-Louise Carven.

== Activities ==
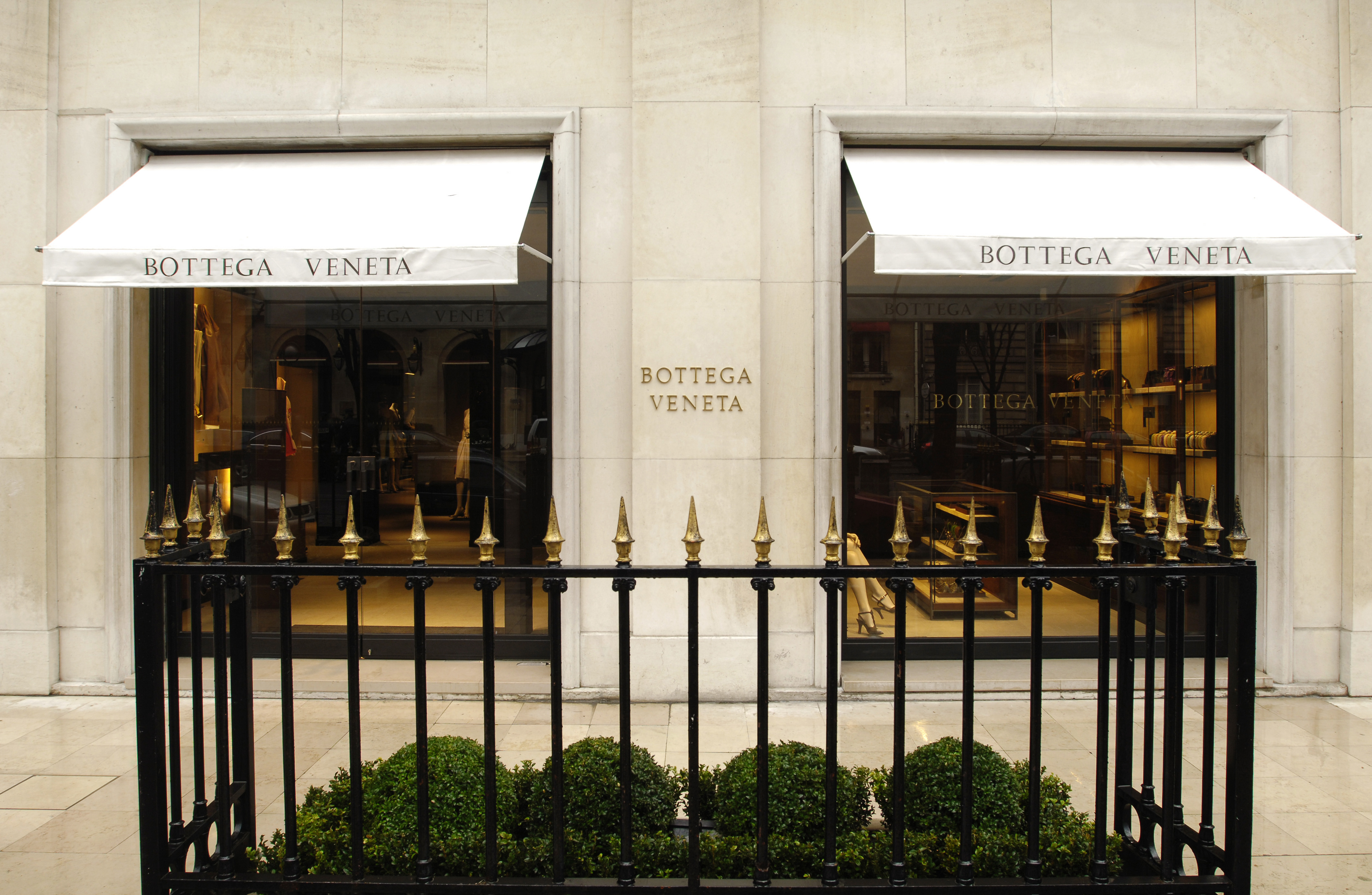
Bottega Veneta store in Paris

Bottega Veneta specializes in haute couture, ready-to-wear, handbags, shoes, accessories, jewelry and fragrances. It operates the Manifattura Veneta Pelletterie (leather manufacturer) in Altavilla Vicentina (since 2011), in Malo (since 2012), and in Dueville (since 2019) in the Veneto region. The company is part of the luxury group Kering. In 2024, Bottega Veneta's revenue reached 1.7 billion euros.

In October 2023, Bottega Veneta inaugurated the Accademia Labor et Ingenium which offers artisanal training programs taught by the brand's master artisans for external students, and new and existing employees.

== Arts and culture ==
Since 2021, Bottega Veneta showcases traditional artisan workshops worldwide through the annual initiative 'Bottega for Bottegas'.

In 2021, Bottega Veneta partnered with the Biennale College to sponsor the annual Venice Dance Biennale. In 2022, the brand started to sponsor The Hyères International Festival of Fashion, Photography and Accessories. In 2023, Bottega Veneta launched an annual partnership with the Aspen Art Museum.

The Italian house supported the relaunch of the gay magazine Butt in 2022, and the launch of the African culture magazine Air Afrique and the art journal Magma in 2023.

In May 2025, Bottega Veneta supported Dia Beacon Spring Benefit 2025.

== Governance ==
CEOs

- 2001–2008: Patrizio di Marco
- 2009–2014: Marco Bizzarri
- 2015–2016: Carlo Beretta
- 2016–2019: Claus-Dietrich Lahrs
- Since 2019: Bartolomeo Rongone

Creative directors

- 1966–1970s: Renzo Zengiaro
- 1980s–2001: Laura Braggion
- 2001–2018: Tomas Maier
- 2018–2021: Daniel Lee
- 2021–2024: Matthieu Blazy
- Since 2024: Louise Trotter

== Financial results ==
Year	Revenue (billion €)
2023	1.645
2024	1.713

== Advertising ==
=== Photographers ===
For its advertisement campaigns, Bottega Veneta has been working with photographers including Philip-Lorca diCorcia (2005), Lord Snowdon (2006), Annie Leibovitz (2007), Tina Barney (2007), Larry Sultan (2008), Sam Taylor-Wood (2008), Nick Knight (2008), Stephen Shore, Steven Meisel (2009), Nan Goldin (2010), Robert Longo (2010), Alex Prager (2011), Mona Kuhn (2011), Robert Polidori (2011), Jack Pierson (2011), Erwin Olaf (2012), Collier Schorr (2012), Peter Lindbergh (2012), Pieter Hugo (2014), Ryan McGinley (2014), Nobuyoshi Araki (2014), Juergen Teller (2015), Raymond Meier (2015), Viviane Sassen (2016), and Todd Hido (2017).

=== Brand ambassadors ===
RM was announced as the first ever Brand Ambassador of Bottega Veneta (2023), followed by A$AP Rocky (2024), Jacob Elordi (2024), and I.N (2025).

== Bibliography ==
- Moltedo, Laura (1995). Bottega Veneta. New York. ASIN B073WC95KJ.
- Maier, Tomas (2015). Bottega Veneta: When Your Own Initials Are Enough. Rizzoli. ISBN 9780847837885.
- Maier, Tomas (2015). Bottega Veneta : Art of Collaboration. Rizzoli. ISBN 978-0-8478-4603-0.
