= Marco Bizzarri =

Italian businessperson (born 1962)

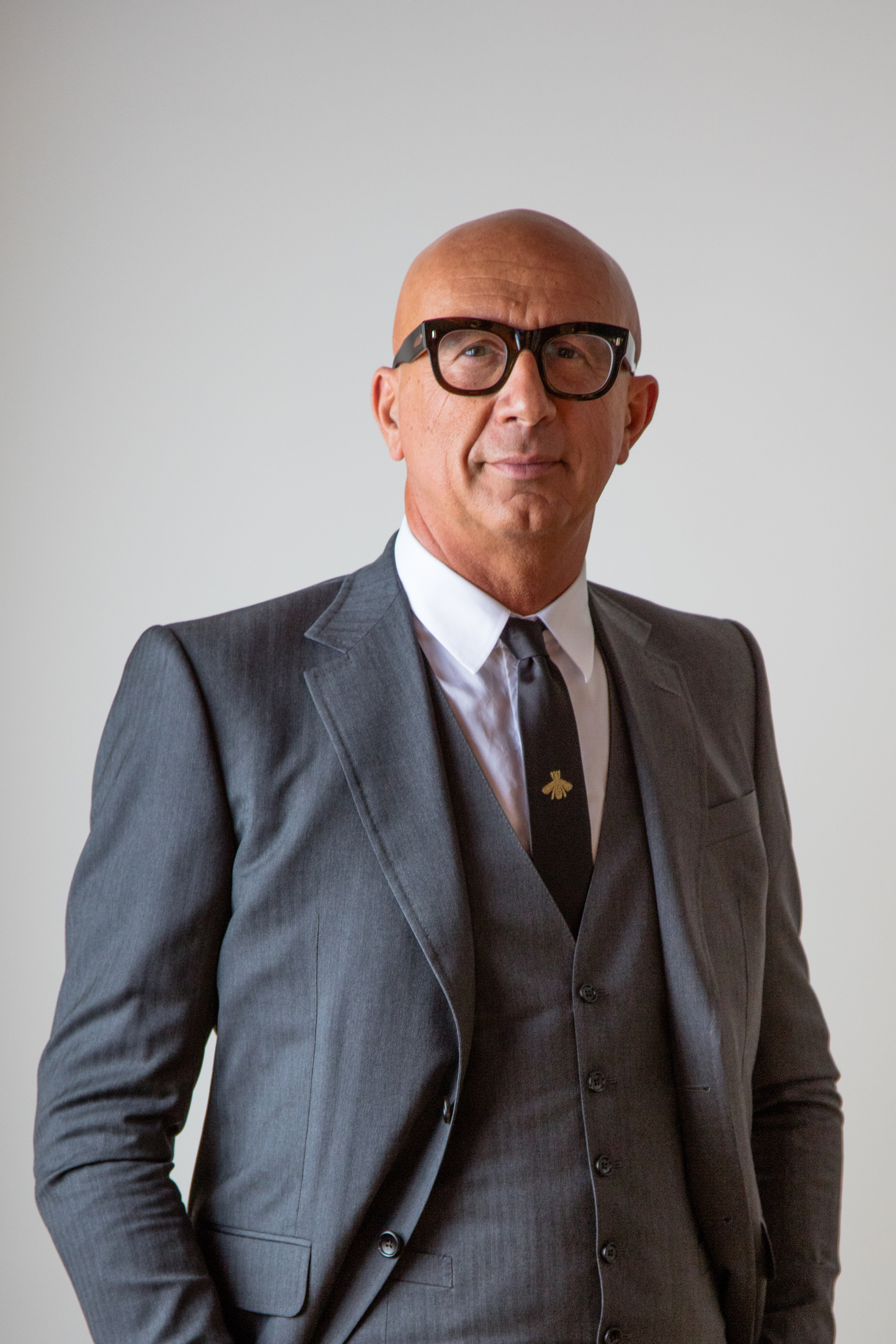
- Bizzarri in 2018
- Born: 19 August 1962 (age 63); Reggio Emilia, Italy
- Years active: 1986–present
- Title: President and CEO, Gucci
- Board member of: Kering

Marco Bizzarri (born 19 August 1962) is an Italian business executive, president and CEO of Gucci since January 2015 till December 2023. He previously was president and CEO of Stella McCartney (2005–2009) and Bottega Veneta (2009–2014), and joined Kering's executive committee in 2012.

== Biography ==
=== Early career ===
Bizzarri started his career as a consultant for the management consulting firm Accenture in 1986. In 1993, he joined the Bologna-based Mandarina Duck group, and later became CEO of the group. In 2004, he became general manager of the designer brand Marithé et François Girbaud.

=== CEO of Kering's brands ===
In 2005, Bizzarri was named President and CEO of Stella McCartney. Under his management, the company turned a profit for the first time in 2007. He developed a lifestyle-oriented brand and drove its international development, including the opening of a store in Japan in 2008.

In January 2009, Bizzarri became the president and CEO of Bottega Veneta. Amid a global economic downturn, he rapidly changed the distribution of the brand to reposition it in Europe, and worked on a less conservative buying, thus relieving financial stress and enabling new investments. In 4 years, alongside the creative director Tomas Maier, Bizzarri maintained Bottega Veneta's edge for Italian-made leather craftsmanship, drove growth in Asia, opened a flagship store in Milan, and new eco-friendly headquarters in Vicenza. In 2012, Bottega Veneta’s sales reached the $1 billion mark.

In 2012, Bizzarri became a member of the executive committee of Kering. In April 2014, Bizzarri was named CEO of Kering's newly-created couture and leather goods division, directly supervising most of Kering's luxury brands.

=== President and CEO of Gucci ===
In December 2014, Kering named Bizzarri president and CEO of its flagship luxury brand Gucci. His first move was to name a 12-year Gucci member of the creative team, Alessandro Michele, creative director of the brand, who successfully managed to renew the brand’s popularity with a «geek chic» props. Marco Bizzarri stopped the brand's markdown policy, favored cross-gendered collections and unified fashion shows and banned the use of fur by the brand. Gucci also amplified its digital strategy to grow its customer-base on social networks.

Bizzarri opened the Gucci Hub in September 2016 (Gucci headquarters and creative hub in Milan), the ArtLab in April 2018 (Gucci's 37,000-square-metre creative hub in Casellina near Florence, Italy), and Gucci 9 in April 2019 (Gucci's 500-employee network of 6 call centers worldwide for high-end customer service). In January 2018, he inaugurated the renovated Gucci Museum (in the Palazzo della Mercanzia in Florence) renamed Gucci Garden, and the launch of a new restaurant, the Gucci Osteria da Massimo Bottura.

In 2019, Bizzarri announced that Gucci was carbon-neutral in its own operations and across its supply chain since 2018, thanks to drastic reductions of its greenhouse gas emissions. He also announced that the firm was changing its production strategy, partnering with the UN-led forest conservation program REDD+ to reduce its carbon footprint, and launched the CEO Carbon Neutral Challenge Initiative to encourage other firm executives to follow suit.

Under Bizzarri's tenure, Gucci's annual sales grew from 3.9 billion euros in 2015 to 9.6 billion euros in 2019.

== Awards ==
- 2020: GQ Italy's Best dressed man
- 2018, 2017, 2016: International Business Leader at the Fashion Awards.
- 2017: Knight of the Legion of Honour (France).
- 2017: WWD Edward Nardoza Honor for CEO Creative Leadership.
- 2017 : Most Creative People in Business by Fast Company.
- 2015: Humanitarian of the Year award by the United Nations Association.
