= Larissa Sansour =

Palestinian artist (born 1973)

- لاريسا سنسور
- Born: 1973 (age 52–53); East Jerusalem, Palestine
- Education: Byam Shaw School of Art, Maryland Institute College of Art, New York University, University of Baltimore, Royal Danish Academy of Fine Arts
- Occupations: Filmmaker, installation artist
- Website: https://larissasansour.com/

Larissa Sansour (Arabic: لاريسا سنسور; born 1973) is a Palestinian artist who currently resides in London, England. Her practice includes photography, film, sculpture, and installation art. Some of her works include Tank (2003), Bethlehem Bandolero (2005), Happy Days (2006), Cairo Taxilogue (2008), The Novel of Novel and Novel (2009), Falafel Road (2010), Palestinauts (2010), Nation Estate (2012), In the Future, They Ate From the Finest Porcelain (2016), and Archaeology in Absentia (2016).

== Early life and education ==
Sansour was born in 1973 in East Jerusalem to a Palestinian father and a Russian mother and grew up in Bethlehem. Her sister is filmmaker Leila Sansour.

Sansour studied at the Byam Shaw School of Art. Sansour received a BFA from the Maryland Institute College of Art and an MA in fine art from New York University. She studied art history and criticism at the University of Baltimore and was a visiting student at the Royal Danish Academy of Fine Arts.

== Career ==
In her art, Sansour uses video, photography, book form and web pages, as well as installation art. She includes references to various elements from popular culture such as Spaghetti Westerns, horror films and superheroes. She also makes use of science fiction as a vehicle for providing an alternative perspective on current social issues.

Sansour has had solo exhibitions in New York City, Copenhagen, Stockholm, Istanbul and Paris. She has been included in group exhibitions including the Istanbul Biennial, the Busan Biennale in South Korea and the Liverpool Biennial, as well as exhibitions at the Tate Modern, the Brooklyn Museum, the Centre Georges Pompidou, the Museo Nacional Centro de Arte Reina Sofía, the Louisiana Museum of Modern Art and the Hiroshima City Museum of Contemporary Art. Her work is included in the collections of the Imperial War Museum in London, the Wolverhampton Art Gallery, the Museum of Contemporary Art in Denmark, the Carlsberg Foundation, the Barjeel Art Foundation, the Louis Vuitton Collection and the Nadour Collection.

In 2011, the annual Elysée art prize competition was cancelled after Sansour's work Nation Estate was excluded by sponsor Lacoste on the grounds that the work was not compatible with the competitions theme of "joie de vivre". Interpreting Lacoste's decision as political, the Musée de l'Élysée chose to cancel the prize.

Her show at the Mosaic Rooms was cited in Art Review as one of the world's "must-see" exhibitions in the summer of 2016.

Larissa Sansour represented Denmark at the Venice Biennale 2019 with her exhibition Heirloom; an enactment of a dystopic future in a state of an undergone ecological collapse. In 2020 her work was presented at Bildmuseet, Umeå University, Sweden, showing the Heirloom exhibition. The exhibition included Sansour's science fiction film In Vitro, which, as the artist explained in Ocula Magazine, "questions the cyclicality of history and the fact that no matter where we are heading, revision is always needed."

In 2022, Sansour and her husband Søren Lind debuted a new film installation, As If No Misfortune Had Occurred In The Night, at FACT Liverpool. The installation was a three-channel video setup with surround sound, displaying the 22-minute film, which centers around an Arabic-language opera performed by Palestinian soprano Nour Darwish.

Sansour and Lind continued collaborating in 2023 with their film Familiar Phantoms. The work draws on Sansour's Palestinian and Russian family history, providing "intimate insight into how personal identity is shaped by geo-political events and how the experiences of our ancestors imprint themselves on our lives." The film was jointly commissioned by the Whitworth and Film and Video Umbrella in association with the Irish Museum of Modern Art.

=== Venice Biennale 2019 ===
In 2018 Larissa Sansour was appointed by The Danish Arts Foundation to represent Denmark at Venice Biennale 2019 – La Biennale di Venezia – the 58th International Art Exhibition. Dutch curator Nat Muller has been selected to curate the exhibition, called Heirloom, in the Danish pavilion.

== Personal life ==
Larissa is married to Søren Lind and lives in London, having previously been resident in Denmark.

== Filmography ==
- Bethlehem Bandolero, short (2005)
- Happy Days, 2, short (2006)
- Soup Over Bethlehem, documentary (2007)
- Run Lara Run, 2, short (2008)
- SBARA, short (2008)
- A Space Exodus, science fiction (2009), nominated for a Muhr award at the Dubai International Film Festival
- Falafel Road, documentary (2011), with Oreet Ashery
- Trespass the Salt, documentary (2011)
- Feast of the Inhabitants, short (2012)
- Nation Estate, science fiction (2012)
- In The Future, They Ate from the Finest Porcelain, science fiction (2015), nominated for a Muhr award at the Dubai International Film Festival
- In Vitro, short (2019)
- As If No Misfortune Had Occurred In The Night, short (2022)
