= Izod Lacoste =

Brand name of sportswear

Izod Lacoste is a brand name of sportswear that was licensed to Izod by Lacoste from 1952 to 1993.

== History of the partnership ==
In 1953, David Crystal, the owner of Izod and Haymaker, bought 50% of the rights to market Lacoste in America. The "Izod" and "Haymaker" brands were already established there. "Lacoste" was added to enhance the brands' prestige and introduce the name to American markets. The resulting union of the two companies was the piqué polo/tennis shirt. When the shirts began to sell well, Crystal decided to keep the combined names. The brand hit its peak popularity in the late '70s and early '80s when the "preppy" look became mainstream, with many nationwide department stores featuring separate "Izod/Lacoste" shops, with jackets, sweaters, and a wide variety of other apparel. During this period, annual sales reached $150 million for the shirts alone.

=== Decline ===
The "preppy" trend cooled in the late 1980s and the brand became overexposed. The market was also saturated with knock-off replicas. The name was split in the early 1990s when Crystal sought to expand company sales. Lacoste moved upmarket in an attempt to recapture its "elite" status. Meanwhile, Izod was reintroduced as midrange apparel. While this tactic worked for a short period, it could not support Crystal's company, which was heavily in debt due to poor investments in other brands such as Salty Dog and Gant. The marketing license was ended in the mid-1990s after his company became too financially burdened. In 1993, he sold his 50% share of Lacoste to Sportloisirs S.A. (which originally marketed the shirt in France). When the company folded shortly thereafter, Izod was sold to shirtmaker Van Heusen.

== Today ==
Izod and Lacoste both continue to produce similar piqué polo shirts and are often mistakenly believed to be the same company. Lacoste polo shirts have the crocodile logo, while Izod has a monogram crest. Izod has had a number of repositionings in the marketplace (its current image being midrange preppy and performance apparel). Lacoste's current positioning remains entirely upscale. Both brands continue to be popular.
