= Lacoste =

French clothing company

Lacoste S.A.

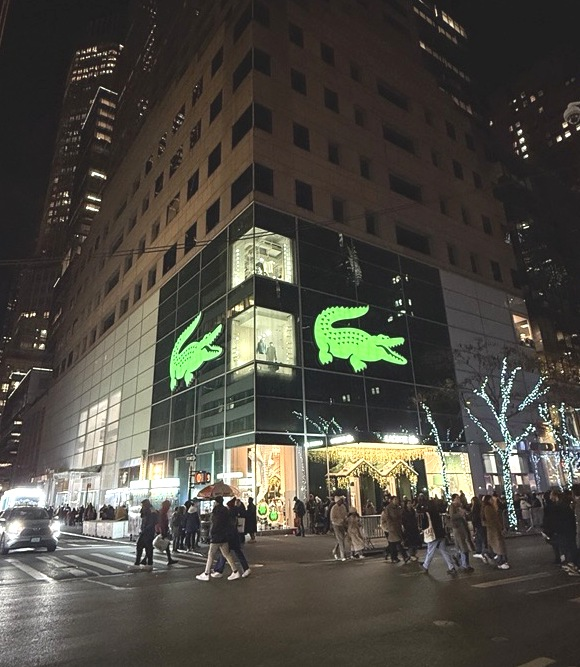
- Flagship store on Fifth Avenue, New York City
- Type: Société anonyme
- Industry: Fashion
- Founded: 1933; 93 years ago
- Founders: René Lacoste; André Gillier
- Headquarters: Paris, France
- Number of locations: 1,100 (2024)
- Area served: Worldwide
- Key people: Eric Vallat; (CEO); Pelagia Kolotouros; (Creative director)
- Products: Clothing; Footwear; Fragrances; Home textile; Sunglasses; Jewelry
- Revenue: ▲€2.9 billion (2023)
- Number of employees: 8,200 (2024)
- Parent: Maus Frères
- Website: lacoste.com

Lacoste S.A. (/ləˈkɔːst, -ˈkɒst/; French: [lakɔst]) is a French designer fashion brand, founded in 1933 by tennis player René Lacoste, and entrepreneur André Gillier. It sells clothing, footwear, sportswear, eyewear, leather goods, perfume, towels and watches. The company is globally recognised by its signature green crocodile logo.

In November 2012, Lacoste was bought outright by Swiss family held group Maus Frères.

== History ==
=== Early years ===
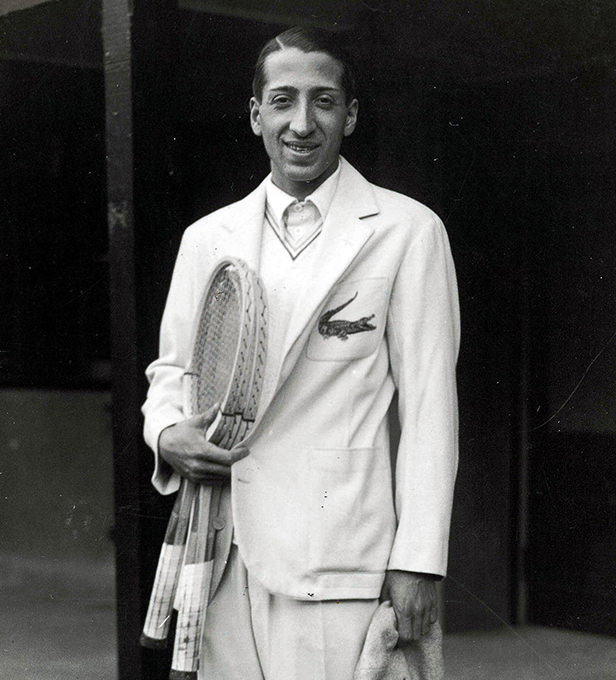
René Lacoste founded La Chemise Lacoste in 1933 with André Gillier.

In 1923, an American journalist from Boston began to nickname 19-year-old tennis prodigy René Lacoste, "the Crocodile", as to reflect his ferocious on-court determination whilst subtly referring to an unusual bet that Lacoste made to his team captain Allan Muhr, that he must buy him a crocodile-skinned suitcase if he wins the next match.

The bet was lost but the nickname stayed, and in 1927 American stylist Robert George depicted drawings and sketches of crocodiles to his friend Lacoste, who then embroidered one of them to his white blazer that he wore before every match.

In 1933 Lacoste began to brand clothing as La Chemise Lacoste with André Gillier, the owner and president of the largest French knitwear manufacturing firm at the time. They began to produce the revolutionary polo Lacoste had designed and worn on the tennis courts, with the crocodile logo embroidered on the chest. The company claims this as the first example of a brand appearing on a sport clothing.

=== Expansion to the U.S. market ===
Starting in the 1950s, Izod produced clothing known as Izod Lacoste under exclusive license for sale in the U.S. market. The partnership ended in 1993 when Lacoste regained control of its U.S. rights to market its own brand. In 1977, Le Tigre was founded in an attempt to directly compete with Lacoste in the U.S. market, selling a similar array of clothing, but featuring a tiger in place of the signature Lacoste crocodile.

== Creative direction ==
=== Christophe Lemaire, 2001–2010 ===
In 2001, French designer Christophe Lemaire was hired to create a more modern, upscale look at Lacoste. In 2005, almost 50 million Lacoste products were sold in over 110 countries. Its visibility has increased due to the contracts between Lacoste and several tennis players, including former American tennis players Andy Roddick and John Isner, French veteran Richard Gasquet, and Swiss Olympic gold medalist Stanislas Wawrinka. Lacoste had also begun to increase its presence in the golf world, where noted two-time Masters Tournament champion José María Olazábal and Scottish golfer Colin Montgomerie have been seen sporting Lacoste shirts in tournaments.

Bernard Lacoste became seriously ill in early 2005, which led him to transfer the presidency of Lacoste to his younger brother and closest collaborator for many years, Michel Lacoste. Bernard died in Paris on 21 March 2006.

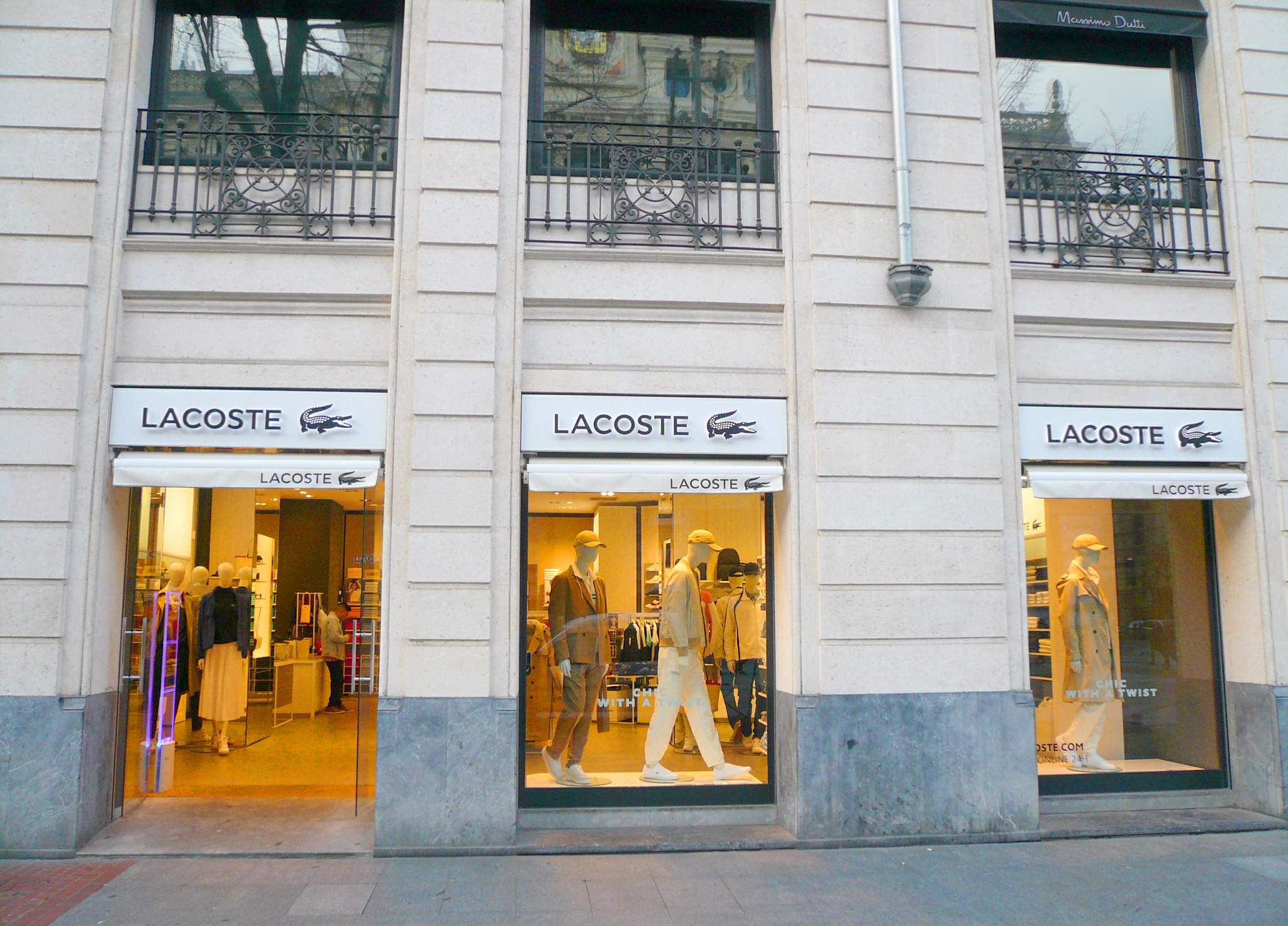
A Lacoste store in Bilbao, Spain

Lacoste licensed its trademark to various companies. Devanlay long owned the exclusive worldwide clothing license, though today Lacoste Polo Shirts are also manufactured under licence in Thailand by ICC and also in China. The brand had entered into agreements with Pentland Group to produce Lacoste footwear; with Coty Inc. to produce fragrance; with Samsonite to produce luggage (2001–2009); and CEMALAC held the license to produce Lacoste bags and small leather goods.

In June 2007, Lacoste introduced their e-commerce site for the U.S. market. In 2009, Hayden Christensen became the face of the Challenge fragrance for men.

=== Felipe Oliveira Baptista, 2010–2018 ===
In September 2010, Christophe Lemaire stepped down and Felipe Oliveira Baptista succeeded him as the creative manager of Lacoste.

In 2010, Lacoste first entered into a licensing agreement with Marchon Eyewear to design, produce and distribute Lacoste-branded optical and sunglasses. Also in 2010, Lacoste introduced its first fashion jewelry line through a four-year license with Le Cheylard, France-based GL Bijoux Group.

In 2012, Lacoste was acquired fully by Swiss family-held group Maus Freres, valuing the company at 1 billion euros.

In 2017, tennis player Novak Djokovic was named brand ambassador and "the new crocodile" (next to Rene Lacoste) for Lacoste. This obligation included a five-year contract as well as multiple appearances in advertising campaigns, and was extended by three years. In 2019, Lacoste appointed Chinese singer/actor Z.Tao as their brand spokesperson for Asia Pacific as the brand's first attempt at appointing someone for the region.

In 2017, 2018, and 2019, Lacoste collaborated with Supreme to release a collection of co-branded clothing.

=== Louise Trotter, 2018–2023 ===
From 2018 to 2023, Louise Trotter served as creative director of Lacoste for a four-year tenure.

Also in 2018, Lacoste formed a joint venture with the Pentland Group, its global licensee for footwear since 1991.

In late 2022, Lacoste its previous relationship with Coty Inc. and signed a 15-year worldwide licensing agreement with Interparfums, with plans to launch a new perfume line in 2024.

=== Pelagia Kolotouros, 2023–present ===
In 2023, Pelagia Kolotouros became the creative design director of Lacoste.

Under the leadership of CEO Thierry Guibert, Lacoste took back control of its distribution networks, moving to a 70 per cent proportion of sales in its own retail stores and 30 per cent through wholesalers, from the inverse ratio previously, in order to better control the brand image and pricing. It also expanded into womenswear and returned to presenting collections at Paris Fashion Week in 2024.

Also under Guibert, Lacoste bought back licences for its shoes, leather goods and undergarments; the remaining Lacoste licensees include Interparfums for fragrances and cosmetics, Marchon for eyewear and Movado for watches and jewelry. In 2024, the brand entered into a worldwide license agreement for the design, production and marketing of its kids’ collections with American company Haddad Brands.

Between 2023 and 2024, Lacoste appointed Arthur Fils, Pierre Niney and Wang Yibo as new brand ambassadors.

In June 2024, Lacoste announced the launch of its new fragrance, Lacoste Original.

== Brand management ==
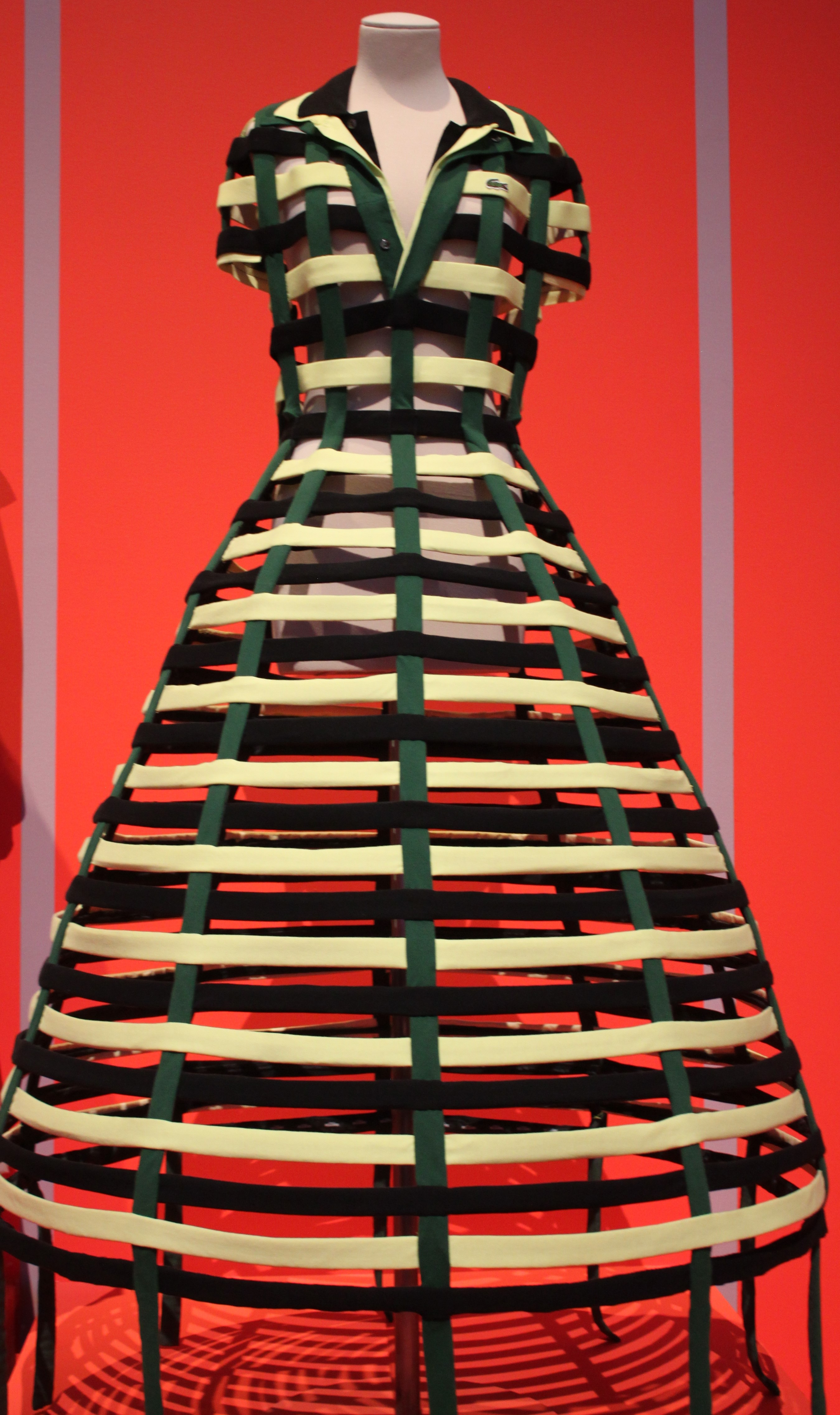
Lacoste dress

In the early 1950s, Bernard Lacoste teamed up with David Crystal, who at the time owned Izod, to produce Izod Lacoste clothing. In the 1970s and 1980s, it was extremely popular with teenagers who called the shirts simply Izod. While the union was both profitable and popular, Izod Lacoste's parent company (Crystal Brands, Inc.) was saddled with debt from other business ventures. When attempts to separate Izod and Lacoste to create revenue did not alleviate the debt, Crystal sold his half of Lacoste back to the French and Izod was sold to Van Heusen.

However, starting in 2000, with the hiring of a new fashion designer Christophe Lemaire, Lacoste began to take over control of its brand name and logo, reining in their branding arrangements.

Lacoste was involved in a long-standing dispute over its logo with Hong Kong–based sportswear company Crocodile Garments. At the time, Lacoste used a crocodile logo that faced right (registered in France in 1933) while Crocodile used one that faced left (registered in various Asian countries in the 1940s and 1950s). Lacoste tried to block an application from Crocodile to register its logo in China during the 1990s, and the dispute ended in a settlement. As part of the agreement, Crocodile agreed to change its logo, which now sports scalier skin, bigger eyes and a tail that rises vertically.

Lacoste was involved in a 20-year legal battle over its logo with Singapore's Crocodile International. The Supreme Court of the Philippines released a November 6, 2023 ruling stating that there was no confusing similarity between the two crocodile trademarks. In deciding in favor of Singapore's Crocodile International Pte. Ltd. against Lacoste, the Court held that there is no evidence of fraud or public confusion, as it underscored the importance of free market.

== Sponsorships ==
=== Tennis ===
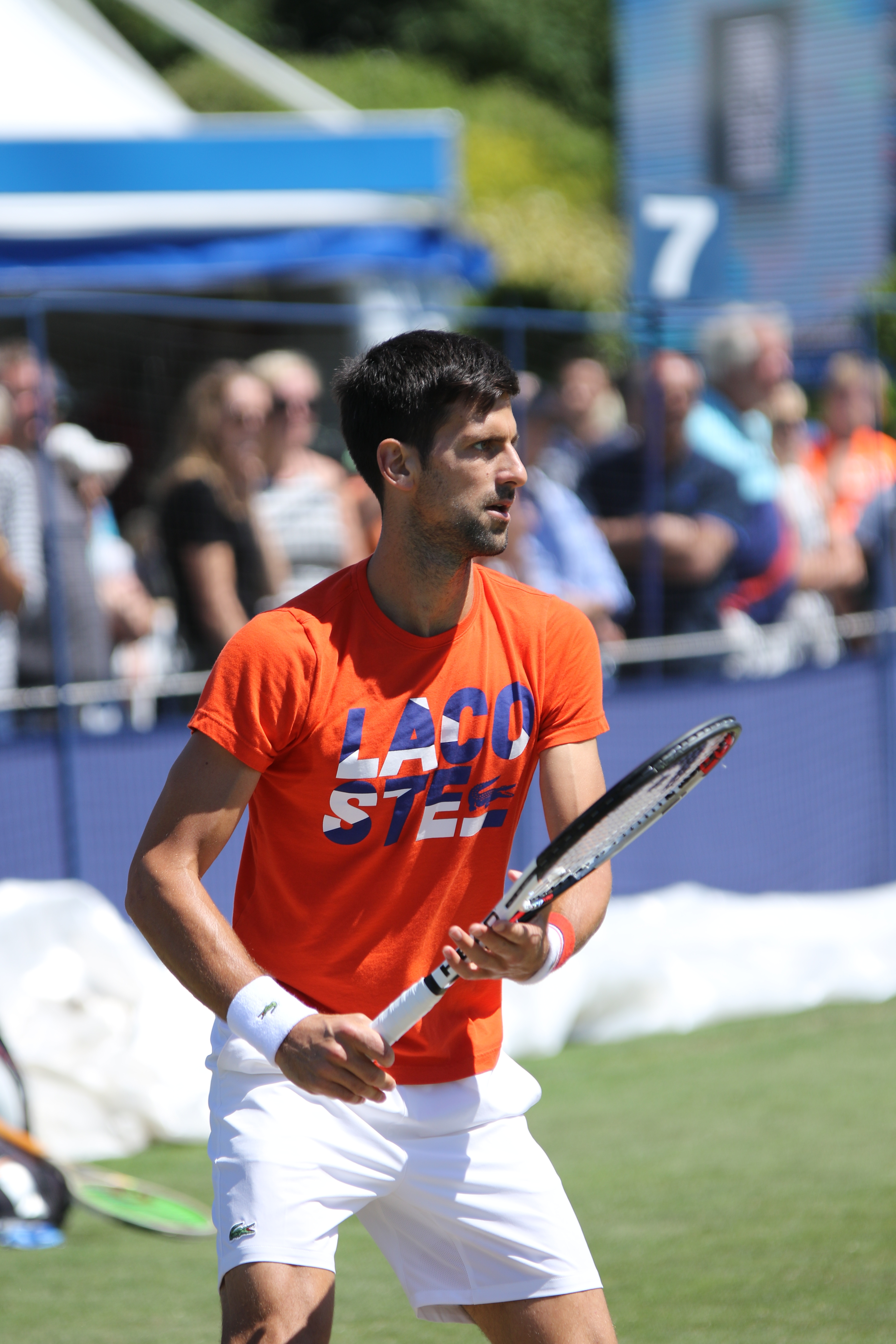
Tennis superstar Novak Djokovic, who has captured the most grand slams of any player under Lacoste

==== Associations and events ====
- (France) Roland-Garros (since 1971)
- (United States) Miami Open (since 2015)
- (France) Paris Masters (since 2024)

==== Professional players ====
- (Australia) Marc Polmans
- (Bulgaria) Grigor Dimitrov
- (Spain) Roberto Bautista Agut
- (Spain) Guillermo Garcia Lopez
- (Spain) Albert Ramos-Viñolas
- (France) Alizé Cornet (to 2018)
- (France) Fiona Ferro
- (France) Pierre-Hugues Herbert
- (France) Ugo Humbert
- (France) Nicolas Mahut
- (France) Benoît Paire (to 2021)
- (France) Arthur Rinderknech
- (France) Arthur Fils
- (South Korea) Hyeon Chung
- (Romania) Marius Copil
- (Russia) Daniil Medvedev
- (Russia) Anastasia Pavlyuchenkova
- (Russia) Elena Vesnina (to 2017)
- (Serbia) Novak Djokovic
- (Serbia) Filip Krajinović
- (Switzerland) Jil Teichmann (to 2023)
- (Chinese Taipei) Latisha Chan
- (Chinese Taipei) Chan Hao-ching
- (Uruguay) Pablo Cuevas
- (United States) Denis Kudla
- (United States) Bernarda Pera
- (Germany) Eva Lys

==== Retired players ====
- (Spain) Pablo Andujar
- (Estonia) Anett Kontaveit
- (France) Julien Benneteau
- (France) Jérémy Chardy
- (Slovakia) Dominika Cibulková
- (United States) Kristie Ahn
- (United States) Christina McHale
- (United States) Martina Navratilova
- (United States) Andy Roddick
- (Australia) Samantha Stosur (to 2012)

=== Golf ===
- (Spain) Adri Arnaus
- (Spain) Azahara Muños
- (France) Céline Boutier
- (France) Camille Chevalier
- (France) Julien Guerrier
- (France) Gregory Havret
- (France) Benjamin Hébert
- (France) Céline Herbin
- (France) Raphael Jacquelin
- (France) Robin Roussel
- (France) Antoine Rozner

== Retailers ==
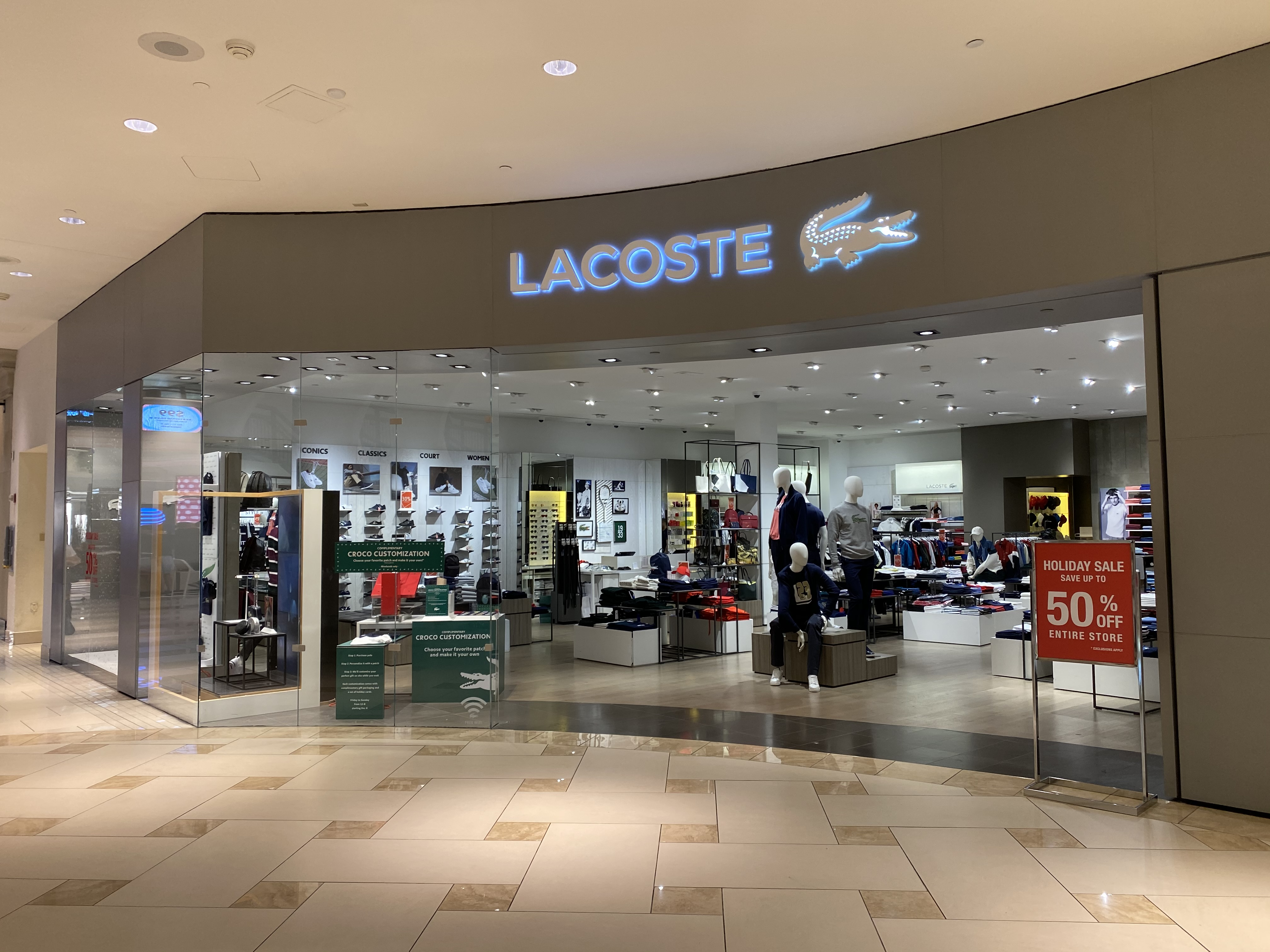
Lacoste store in Aventura, Florida

Lacoste operates a large number of Lacoste boutiques worldwide located as concessions in leading department stores and also as independent venue stores. In the United Kingdom, Lacoste is available from a variety of shops including, JD Sports, KJ Beckett and John Lewis & Partners. Likewise in the United States, the Lacoste brand can be found in stores such as Saks Fifth Avenue, Nordstrom, Lord & Taylor, Neiman Marcus, Bloomingdale's, Macy's, Belk, Halls and other independent retailers. In Canada, Lacoste is sold at Harry Rosen, Hudson's Bay, its own boutiques, and other independent retailers. In Australia, it is sold at David Jones and Myer.

== Controversies ==
=== Environmental practices ===
In July 2011, Lacoste, along with other major fashion and sportswear brands including Nike, Adidas and Abercrombie & Fitch, was the subject of Dirty Laundry, a report by the environmental group Greenpeace. According to the findings of the report, Lacoste was accused of working with suppliers in China which contribute to the pollution of the Yangtze and Pearl Rivers. Samples taken from one facility belonging to the Youngor Group located on the Yangtze River Delta and another belonging to the Well Dyeing Factory Ltd. located on a tributary of the Pearl River Delta revealed the presence of hazardous and persistent hormone disruptor chemicals, including alkylphenols, perfluorinated compounds and perfluorooctane sulfonate.

=== Censorship of Palestinian art ===
In December 2011, Lacoste was accused of censoring the work of Palestinian artist Larissa Sansour. Sansour had initially been included on a shortlist of eight nominees for the prestigious Lacoste Élysée prize – a competition which had been organised by the Musée de l'Élysée in Lausanne, Switzerland, with Lacoste's sponsorship. Sansour's entry into the competition was entitled "Nation Estate", which involved a series of "dystopic sci-fi images based on Palestine's admission to UNESCO". In this work Sansour imagines the state contained within a single skyscraper, with each floor representing a replica of "lost cities" including Jerusalem, Ramallah and Sansour's own hometown of Bethlehem.

A month before the selection jury was to meet to choose the winner, however, the Musée de l'Élysée informed Sansour that Lacoste had changed its mind about including her work in the competition and asked the Museum to remove her as a nominee citing her work to be "too pro-Palestinian". Sansour soon went public with her story and within 48 hours the Musée de l'Élysée came out in her support announcing, in a press release, that it had decided to suspend its relationship with Lacoste as a sponsor of this prize due to its insistence on excluding Sansour from the competition. The museum emphasized that its decision to end the competition was in line with the organisation's 25 years of commitment to artistic freedom.

Lacoste's attempt to censor Sansour's work led to widespread international negative media reports on the company's actions and renewed discussions on the role of private sector companies in art sponsorships.

=== Xinjiang region ===
In March 2020, the Australian Strategic Policy Institute accused at least 82 major brands, including Lacoste, of being connected to forced Uyghur labor in Xinjiang. Later that July, Lacoste agreed to cease all activity with its suppliers and subcontractors in Xinjiang.

=== Russian invasion of Ukraine ===
Lacoste has faced criticism for continuing its business operations in Russia after the country's full-scale invasion of Ukraine in February 2022. According to Leave Russia and an investigation by Economic Truth, Lacoste has not suspended its activities in the Russian market, drawing condemnation from advocacy groups and human rights organizations. Critics argue that by maintaining its presence in Russia, Lacoste risks indirectly supporting the Russian economy, potentially undermining global sanctions aimed at pressuring the Kremlin to end its aggression against Ukraine.

== See also ==
- Croc O' Shirt
- Crocodile Garments
- Izod
- Izod Lacoste
- Lacoste Essential (fragrance)
- Fred Perry
- Sergio Tacchini
