= Bernard Lacoste =

French fashion designer and businessman (1931 - 2006)

Bernard Lacoste (22 June 1931 – 21 March 2006) was a French fashion designer and businessman.

== Biography ==
Born in Paris on 22 June 1931, Bernard Lacoste was the son of René Lacoste, the founder of the fashion company Lacoste. He attended high school in France and earned the Bachelor of Science at Princeton University in the USA. From February 1954 until February 1956 he was a Lieutenant in the French Air Force. From 1956 until 1963 he worked at General Motors in France.

In 1964, he took the position as head of the internationally known company Lacoste. When he took over the company, it was producing ca 300,000 articles of clothing per year. In 2005, the figure was almost 50 million, which were sold in 110 countries. The company had a gross revenue of billions of US dollars.

In March 2002, he gave over direction of the company to his brother Michel Lacoste due to poor health. Six months later, he died in Paris after a long illness at the age of 74.

== Awards ==
- Companion Member of the Textile Institute (seit 1995)
- Officer of the Légion d'honneur on 11 April 2001
- Knight of the Légion d'honneur on 24 March 1989
- Knight of the Ordre national du Mérite on 23 December 1982

== Further activities ==
- since 2002: Regular Member of the Federation of the European Sporting Goods Industry (FESI)
- since 1997: Director of the General Meeting of Comité Français des Manifestations à l'Etranger
- since 1995: Director of the World Federation Sporting Goods Industry (WFSGI)
- From 1992 to 1997: Active member of the General Meeting of Comité Français des Manifestations Economiques à l'Etranger (CFME)
- since 1988: Director of Union des Fabricants
- since 1986: Active member of the Comité Vendôme
- since 1984: Member of the Comité Colbert
- since 1981: Honorary vice president of the French Federation of Sporting Goods Industry (FIFAS)
- From 1980 to 1983: Director of Centre Français du Commerce Extérieur (CFCE)
- From 1970 to 1974: President of the Neuilly Tennis Association
- From 1981 to 1981: Vice president of the Fédération Française d'Articles de Sport
- From 1966 to 1981: Director of Fédération Française d'Articles de Sport
