= Lacoste Essential =

Men's cologne by Lacoste

Lacoste Essential is the name of a men's cologne produced by high-end apparel company Lacoste. The original Lacoste Essential for men contains aquatics citrus (tangerine, bergamot), tomato leaves, cassis, black pepper, rose, patchouli, sandalwood and “wood accord.” The popular fragrance is recognized by its distinctly shaped glass container, bearing a brushed aluminum atomizer and the trademark Lacoste crocodile emblem engraved into the glass, as well as the liquid's warm yellow-green tint.

== Composition ==
The perfume was introduced in 2005 and created in cooperation with perfumer Laurent Bruyere. The fragrance is described as an "aromatic-woody one created in layers of green accords." The fragrance comprises top notes of tomato leaves, citrus, fruity and watery notes. The scent's heart is made of black pepper and a floral accord, including rose notes. Sandalwood and patchouli notes are in the fragrance's drydown. The overall effect of the scent is frequently described as "fresh" and "energetic" or "spicy."

== Related products ==
The popularity of the fragrance prompted Lacoste to release companion products in addition to the cologne including Lacoste Essential Shower Gel, after-shave and deodorant stick.

== Variants ==
Since the inception of the brand, Lacoste has offered a variety of spin-off fragrances. For men, Lacoste offers the new brands Challenge, Pour Homme, Lacoste Red and Lacoste Elegance. For women, the company offers the fragrances Touch of Pink, Love of Pink (itself a spin-off of the former) and Pour Femme, the sister fragrance to Pour Homme. In 2012, Lacoste announced that actress Amy Adams will be the face of Lacoste's new perfume for women, Eau de Lacoste.
