= Nation Estate =

- Directed by: Larissa Sansour
- Written by: Søren Lind
- Produced by: Morten Revsgaard Frederiksen
- Starring: Larissa Sansour; Leila Sansour; Maxim Sansour
- Cinematography: Jesper Tøffner
- Edited by: William Dybeck Sorensen
- Music by: Aida Nadeem
- Production company: Beofilm
- Release date: 2012
- Running time: 9 minutes
- Countries: Palestine; Denmark
- Languages: Arabic and English

Nation Estate is a 2012 Palestinian short film directed by Larissa Sansour with accompanying images for exhibition. The science fiction film and images depict Palestine as a skyscraper, with each floor as a representation of a city in Palestine. An earlier photographic version of the project garnered attention when it was removed from a competition at the Musée de l'Elysée, allegedly due to its political connotations.

The film, which premiered at the International Film Festival Rotterdam, is the second part of a trilogy which begins with A Space Exodus (2009) and concludes with In the Future They Ate from the Finest Porcelain (2016).

== Plot ==
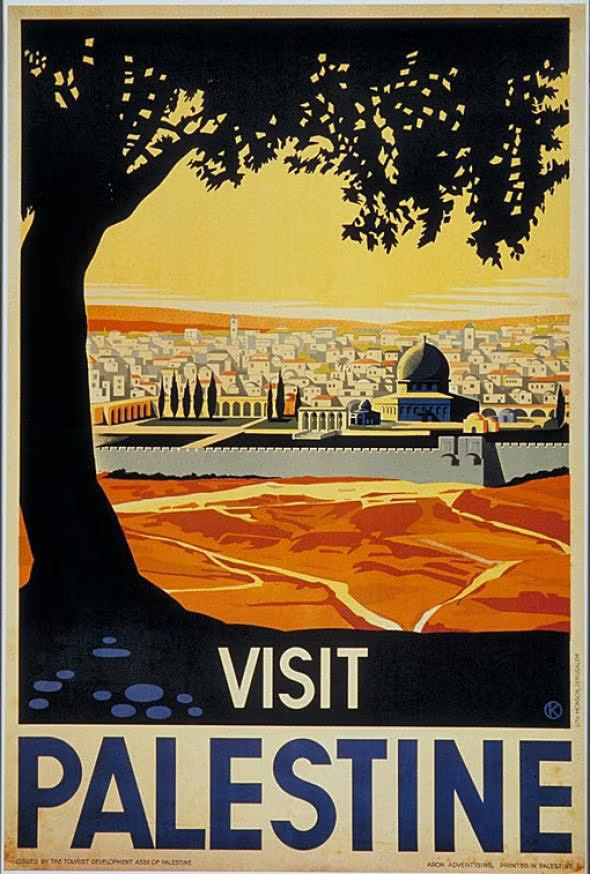
This 1936 poster by Franz Kraus, created for a Zionist organization encouraging Jewish Europeans to "Visit Palestine", was the inspiration for the poster in the film, which also serves as the film's promotional poster.

The film starts with a woman arriving at a train station. She makes her way up an escalator with a travel bag in hand. At the top of the escalator she uses a fingerprint and retinal scan to enter a lobby and walks over to the elevators. As she pushes the button, she looks over to a poster on the wall that reads "Nation Estate: Living the High Life". Next to the elevator is a directory for the building floors. Each floor is described as a city or area in Palestine.

In the elevator, advertisements play on a television screen. The advertisements seem to address different social and political issues that Palestinians face today, such as water supply, food and travelling restrictions. The first stop the elevator makes is on the 13th floor, Jerusalem. As two other 'travelers' make their way off the elevator, what appears to be Al-Aqsa can be seen. The next stop is Bethlehem. As the woman steps off the elevator and walks away, the city's old architecture can be seen as the basis for the floor. She walks into a tunnel that seems to be authentic stone and mortar from the outside, but is more modern on the inside.

She stops at a door, and using a keycard in the form of a Palestinian flag, she opens up the door to an apartment. She sets the keycard down, and picks up a watering can. She heads over to a window, and in front of the window, there is a tree growing out of the ground and she waters it. Afterwards, she heads over to a cabinet and opens it up, revealing multicolored cans. When she grabs one and looks at it, it has a label that says 'Mloukhieh', a food native to the Middle East and North Africa. She returns the can and reaches for another, this time it is 'Marmaon'. She heats it up using a fingerprint and pours it out into a bowl, along with other food. She sets it down on the table and makes her way to the window. After pressing a button on the wall, the view changes into one of Jerusalem behind a wall. The woman holds her belly – revealing she is pregnant – as she looks on to the city below from the skyscaper.

== Cast ==
- Larissa Sansour as Woman with Suitcase
- Leila Sansour as Woman in Elevator
- Maxim Sansour as Man in Elevator
- Jacque Shoen, Maxim Sansour, and Leila Sansour as Voices

== Production ==
As a project, Nation Estate is composed of two parts, the nine-minute short film and a series of seven photographs. Sansour cast herself as the protagonist but neither her nor the other characters that appear in the film have spoken dialogue. The only voices heard are from the announcement systems on the train and elevator.

== Release ==
=== Early iteration ===
In 2011, an earlier multimedia iteration of the project was selected to be a part of the Lacoste Elysée Competition. However, after being shortlisted for a prize by the museum, Sansour was contacted by the museum staff, informing her that her film was deemed "too pro-Palestinian" by the people from Lacoste, allegations which the company later denied. The museum also requested that Sansour release a statement saying that she had "decided to pursue other opportunities." After the work's removal sparked outrage, Lacoste ended its sponsorship of the £21,000 prize while the gallery in turn suspended its relationship with the company.

=== Festivals and exhibition ===
The project was presented in its final form at various festivals and exhibitions. It had its world premiere at the 2013 International Film Festival Rotterdam. The same year, Nation Estate was the winner of the Prize of the Ecumenical Jury at the International Short Film Festival Oberhausen and the Best Short Film of the Critics Jury at the International Festival of Arab Cinemas in Marseille. In 2013, the film was also exhibited at the International Oriental Film Festival Geneva 2013 and the Bucharest International Experimental Film Festival.

From 9 October 2024 to 2 March 2025, Nation Estate along with the two other films in the trilogy and other works by Sansour were exhibited at Amos Rex, a museum in Helsinki.

== Critical response ==
Nation Estate is the second of a series of short films by Sansour. A Space Exodus (2009), the first in the series, imagines a future moon landing in which Sansour as an astronaut plants a Palestinian flag on the moon. Feminist writer Anastasia Murney describes Sarsours films as "often tinged with a bleak humour", with A Space Exodus and the sequel Nation Estate both proposing satirical responses to the question of Palestinian statehood. In the Future They Ate from the Finest Porcelain (2016), as the final film in the series, is the longest at more than 30 minutes and the most pessimistic with "a rough post-apocalyptic setting".

Tom Emery, a writer and curator, described the trilogy as illustrating Sansours development as an artist with "an easily traceable path of progression in terms of technical ability and artistic ambition." About this second film in the series in particular, Emery wrote:

Nation Estate is a film that leaves you wanting more, as Sansour creates an immediately interesting setting and goes about an extremely efficient world-building process, creating a real sense of place and leaving you to wonder about any number of other stories that could be told within the Nation Estate.

Sarsour described Nation Estate as grieving in anticipation of a future when Palestine has been restricted to a single skyscaper building, where all Palestinians live and where their culture is preserved as artefacts on display. The films composition depicts a Palestinian future of "glossy high-tech promise but shadowed by a mournful mood of loss." Sansour combines live action and digital images to build, through a science-fiction lens, a "post-Palestinian" world. Unlike on the Moon, the woman in Nation Estate is geographically close to Jerusalem but trapped in a Palestine that is only a simulacrum with replicas of its cities and towns in exhibit.

In her book Vehicles of Decolonization: Public Transit in the Palestinian West Bank, sociologist Maryam S. Griffin highlights how the train, a vehicle of collective movement, plays a central role in Nation Estate's decolonial critique of the Palestinian statehood project. According to Griffin, this manifests itself in two form. First, with "im/mobilization" featuring as a mechanism fundamental to the Israeli settler colonial project and, second, as a wholesale reimagining of "Palestinian movement across space and time [where even] in the highly constrained dystopian landscape of Nation Estate, Palestinian life persists."
