= Crocodile International =

Garment company in Singapore

Crocodile International Pte Ltd.
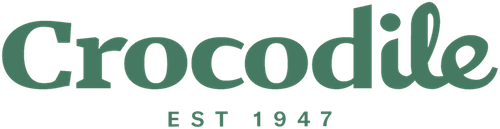
- Logotype
- Type: Private limited
- Industry: Fashion
- Founded: 1947; 79 years ago in the Colony of Singapore
- Founder: Tan Hian Tsin
- Headquarters: 3 Ubi Avenue 3, Singapore
- Area served: Worldwide
- Website: www.crocodileinternational.com

Crocodile International Pte Ltd. or simply Crocodile is a garments company based in Singapore.

== History ==
Crocodile International was founded in 1947 in British Singapore by Tan Hian Tsin. Tan is an immigrant from Swatow, China whose family has been involved in the garment trade including the manufacturing of knitting machines.

Crocodile would open its first factory in British Hong Kong in 1953. By 2016, the fashion brand has 3,000 outlets in 14 countries.

== Brand image ==
The crocodile has been chosen to represent Crocodile International's branding for being a "very tough animal" with a long lifespan. This is connected to Tan's vision for the "long life of the company". The logo of Crocodile International features the reptile facing left. The logo was made in 1947 by Tan and is accompanied by his handwriting.

=== Dispute with Lacoste ===
Crocodile logo with the animal mark. The usage of this logo along with the crocodile by itself on merchandise has been subject to legal dispute with Lacoste in certain markets.

The brand has faced various intellectual property rights disputes with French fashion brand Lacoste, which features a right-facing crocodile, over similarities of their logo. Legal cases has been filed in China, Myanmar, Japan, and the Philippines.

Crocodile International and Lacoste have an existing agreement dated 1983 to have their brands coexist in certain markets.
