= Tomas Maier =

German-born designer

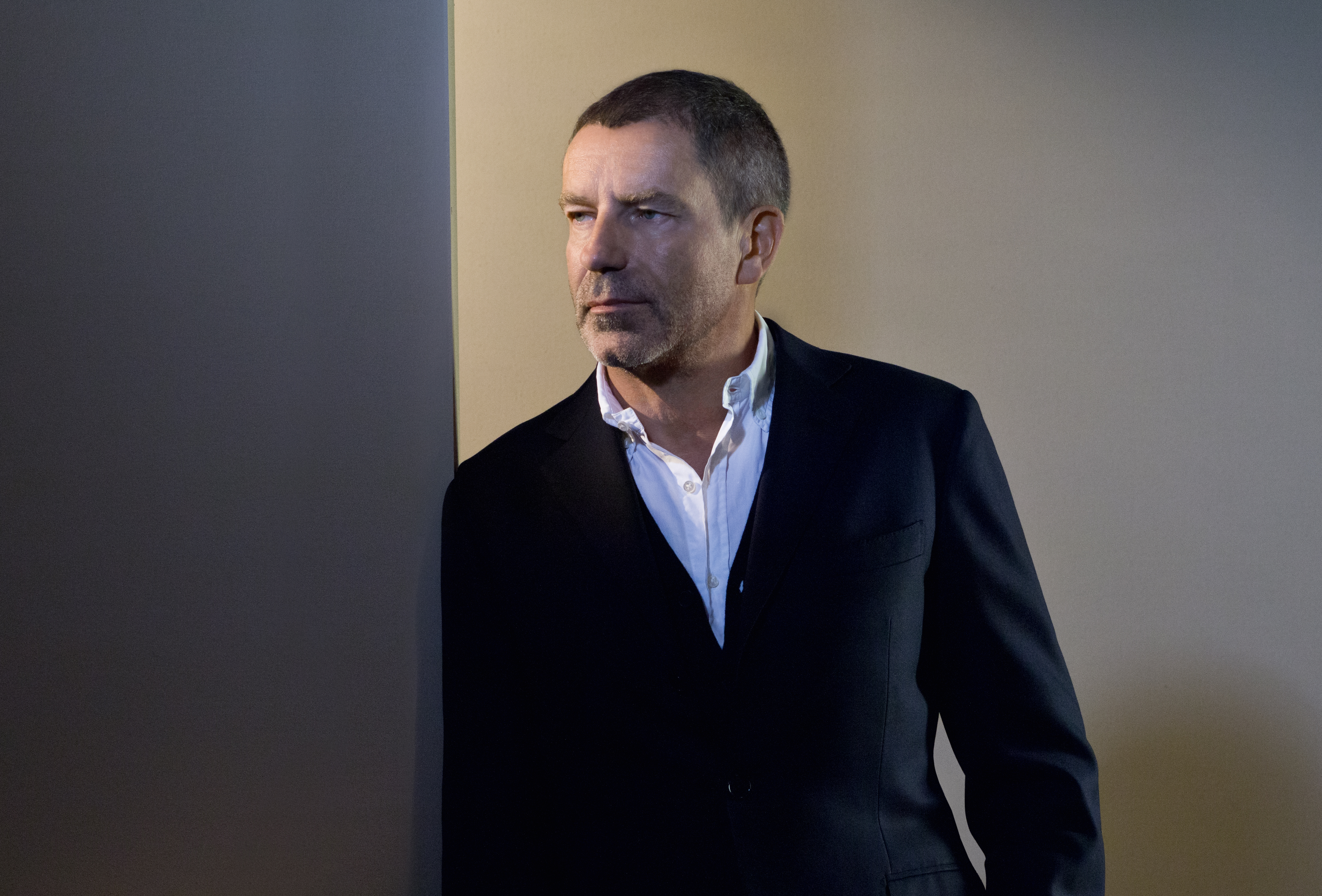
- Born: April 1957 (age 68); Pforzheim, West Germany
- Occupation: Creative Director
- Employer: Bottega Veneta (Former)

Tomas Maier (born 1957) is a German-born designer. From 2001 to 2018, he served as Creative Director at the Italian brand Bottega Veneta.

== Early life and training ==
Born in April 1957 in Pforzheim, West Germany, Maier was raised in a family of architects and attended a Waldorf school as a child. From there he headed to Paris, where he trained at the Chambre Syndicale de la Haute Couture.

== Career ==
Maier's early professional experience includes designing for several fashion and luxury goods houses in France, Italy, and Germany, including Guy Laroche, Sonia Rykiel, where he designed menswear for eight years, and Revillon, where he spent four years as creative director. For nine years, Maier was a women's ready-to-wear designer at Hermès, where he also designed leather goods and accessories. By 1999, he quit his contracts and moved to Florida.

=== Bottega Veneta, 2001–2018 ===
Maier was appointed by Tom Ford to become the Creative Director at Bottega Veneta in June 2001, when the company was acquired by the Gucci Group (which merged with PPR in 2008 and became Kering in 2013).

During his time at Bottega Veneta, Maier presided over an expansion of the brand. He presented his first collection, which consisted solely of accessories, in September 2001, a few months after being hired.

In the first two years, he oversaw the opening of Bottega Veneta flagship stores in London, Paris, Milan, and New York. He also added a small selection of women's and men's ready-to-wear pieces to the seasonal presentations. Among the product categories that Bottega Veneta now offers, in addition to women's and men's ready-to-wear collections, are accessories, jewellery, furniture, seating, tabletop, desktop, luggage, porcelain, eyewear, fragrance and watches. Maier helped found an artisan school, La Scuola della Pelleteria, in Vicenza in 2006. In addition, St. Regis Hotels in Rome and Florence as well as Park Hyatt Hotel in Chicago offer Bottega Veneta suites.

In 2014, Maier and Bottega Veneta partnered with the Japanese publication Casa BRUTUS and launched an initiative to raise awareness of the potential destruction of Modernist buildings in Japan due to economics, politics, and the preparation for the 2020 Summer Olympics.

Under Maier's leadership, Bottega Veneta tripled its revenues and exceeded $1 billion for the first time in 2012 before revenues fluctuated in the following years. By 2017, Saint Laurent overtook Bottega Veneta as Kering's second-biggest source of revenue; Kering announced Maier's resignation on 13 June 2018.

=== Tomas Maier ===
Tomas Maier established a swimwear label in 1997 with business partner Andrew Preston, and an online boutique was launched in 1998. Since then, five eponymous stores have opened in Palm Beach, Bal Harbour, East Hampton, and New York City. The collection is sold at over 100 stores in more than 30 countries. On 19 November 2013, Kering announced it was investing in Tomas Maier's own label to "infuse it with the capital needed to ramp up expansion, including the addition of more company-owned boutiques". As of November 2013, the private label generated about $10 million annually from swimwear, knitwear, and jersey.

In 2018, Tomas Maier teamed up with Japanese casual wear retailer Uniqlo for a one-time-only resort-focused collection. The Tomas Maier brand was shut down in 2018, definitively ending the cooperation between the designer and Kering.
