= Marie-Louise Carven =

French fashion designer (1909 – 2015)

Madame Carven
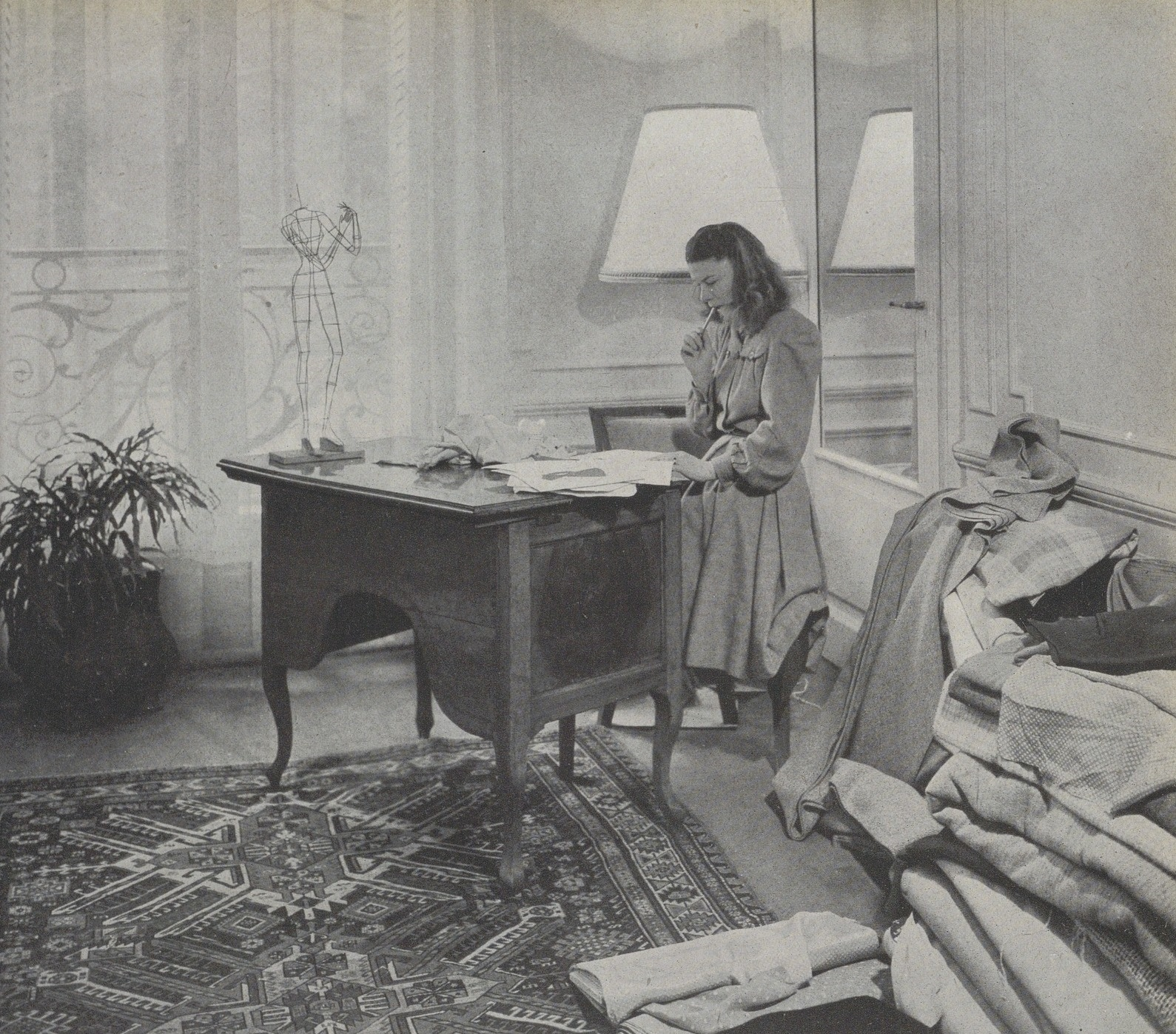
- Born: Carmen Marie Louise Jeanne de Tommaso; 31 August 1909; Châtellerault, France
- Died: 8 June 2015 (aged 105); Paris, France
- Label: Carven
- Spouses: Philippe Mallet (1939–1966; his death); René Grog (1972–1981; his death)
- Awards: Ordre des Arts et des Lettres (1978); Legion of Honour (2009)

Marie-Louise Carven (31 August 1909 – 8 June 2015), born Carmen de Tommaso, was a French fashion designer who founded the house of Carven in 1945. She was noted for her designs for petite women, her use of lightweight fabrics such as lace and pink gingham, and for being one of the first couturieres to launch a prêt-à-porter line. She was the first Paris designer to patent a push-up bra.

== Life ==
Marie-Louise Carven was born Carmen de Tommaso on 31 August 1909 in Châtellerault, France. However, she strongly disliked her given name, and when she founded her business, she assumed the name by which she is better known. Carven showed an interest in fashion design from a young age by making outfits for her pet cat.

As a young woman, Carven studied architecture and interior decor at the École des Beaux-Arts in Paris.

In the 1940s, she employed the Romanian Jew Henry Bricianer in her shop in Paris despite antisemitic Vichy laws. When the police came for Bricanier, she hid him in the building where her shop was, and allowed him to continue his work. As well, she allowed four members of Bricanier's family to live with her own relatives; this enabled them and Henry to survive until the end of World War II.

She had a chateau in Chantilly, where she kept kangaroos and peacocks, and a summer house on the Riviera.

Carven died in Paris on 8 June 2015, aged 105.

== Career ==
In 1945, at the age of 36, Carven opened her fashion house on the Champs-Élysées. The name Carven combined Carmen, her given name, with the last name of her aunt Josy Boyriven, who introduced her to couture. The 5'1" Carven focused her line on petite women, "because [she] was too short to wear the creations of the top couturiers, who only ever showed their designs on towering girls."

Carven soon became known as "the smallest of big couturiers." The signature piece from her first collection was a full skirted, green and white striped summer dress. Green and white stripes became the signature of the House of Carven. The material had been found in the attic of a chateau and was likely originally purchased for the summer uniforms of housemaids prior to World War I. Her early clients included Leslie Caron, Martine Carol, Zizi Jeanmaire, and Édith Piaf.

Carven was an inventive marketer. In 1946, she publicized the launch of her first perfume by parachuting hundreds of sample bottles across Paris. In 1950, Carven created a collection inspired by Gone with the Wind to coincide with the film's French release. She toured France with the collection, staging fashion shows at movie theaters.

In 1950, she became one of the first couturiers to develop prêt-à-porter. Her preference for simple materials such as pink gingham and broderie anglaise eased her transition to ready-to-wear.

In 1955, she launched Carven Junior.

Carven was one of the first fashion houses to stage runway shows around the world. The designer's travel inspired her to use diverse materials such as madras, batik, and raffia in her collections. In the 1950s, Carven was one of the first Western designers to use African textiles.

Carven designed uniforms for the 1976 French Olympic team, Parisian traffic wardens, Eurostar staff, and over 20 airlines.

Carven was also the costume designer for eleven films, including Manon (1949), Rendezvous in July (1949), Edward and Caroline (1951), Holiday for Henrietta (1952), and Le Guérisseur (1953). She also worked for the costume and wardrobe department for the film The Red Shoes (1948), and for the episode Gold (1952) of the television series Foreign Intrigue. She worked for the art department for the Perry Mason episode The Case of the Gallant Grafter (1960).

Carven retired at age 84 in 1993.

In 2001, she gifted her archives to the Musée Galliera.

== Awards ==
In August 2000, Carven was named Righteous Among the Nations by Yad Vashem.

At her hundredth birthday party in 2009, she was made a commander of the Legion of Honor.
