= Aéropostale (clothing brand) =

American clothing retailer

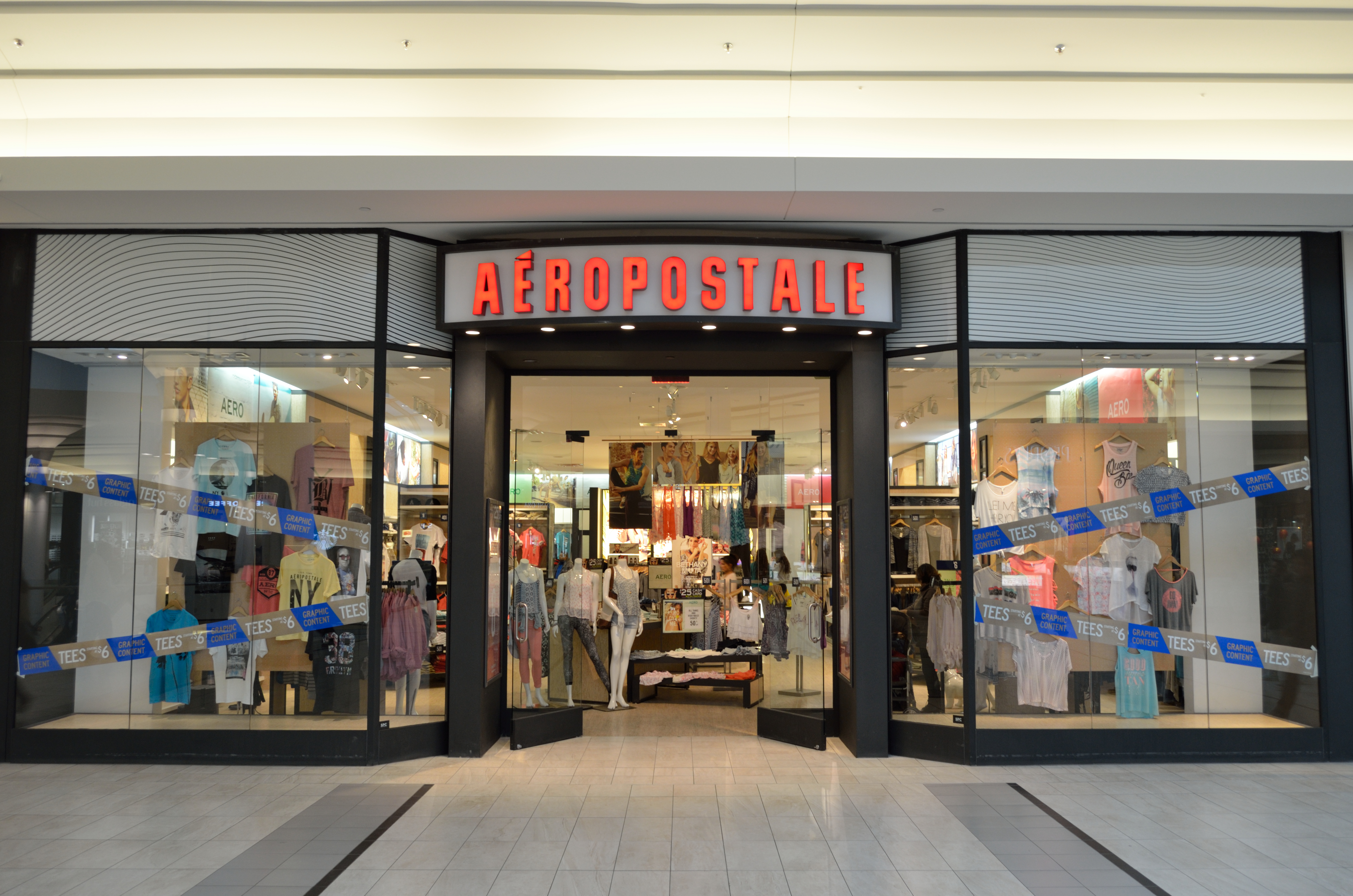
- Aéropostale at CF Markville in Ontario in 2015, closed a year later
- Type: Subsidiary
- Industry: Retail
- Founded: 1987 (39 years ago) in Seattle, Washington, U.S.
- Founder: Macy’s
- Headquarters: New York City, U.S.
- Number of locations: 800
- Area served: Worldwide
- Key people: Marc Miller (CEO)
- Products: Apparel & accessories
- Revenue: ▲US$1 billion (2021)
- Owner: Authentic Brands Group
- Number of employees: 21,007 (January 31, 2015)
- Parent: Macy's (1987–1994); Federated Department Stores (1994–1998); SPARC Group (2016–2025); Catalyst Brands (2025–present)
- Website: aeropostale.com

Aéropostale Inc., is an American shopping mall–based retailer of casual apparel and accessories, principally aimed at young adults and teenagers. It was created by Macy's and, after a bankruptcy in 2016, is currently owned by Catalyst Brands, which also owns several other well-known brands, including Brooks Brothers, Eddie Bauer, JCPenney, Lucky Brand Jeans, and Nautica. The company sells its products through Aéropostale retail stores, its website, and third-party retailers, such as Target in the United States.

Licensees operate Aéropostale and P.S. from Aéropostale locations in the Middle East, Asia, Europe, and Latin America. The first Aéropostale stores were opened in 1987 by R H Macy & Co. in Thousand Oaks, California, and Short Hills, New Jersey.

== Pronunciation ==
Many different pronunciations of the brand name have developed in the United States: arrow-PAUSE-tall, arrow-PUS-tall-ee etc.. According to a video posted by the company on YouTube, the English pronunciation is a simplified version of the French word for "airmail service". In French, it's /a e ʁɔ pɔs ˈtal/. In English, it's /ˌɛər oʊ poʊ ˈstɒl/ or, in spelling pronunciation, "arrow-post-ALL."

== Subsidiaries ==
The now-defunct P.S. from Aéropostale began in 2009, and originally only offered apparel at value prices to the 7–12 age market. In winter of 2011, P.S. added apparel for three-, four-, five- and six-year-olds to their collections, being introduced with the holiday clothing. Beginning in November 2013, the Bethany Mota collection was added to Aéropostale stores, featuring clothing and accessories designed by American video blogger Bethany Mota. Also beginning in the fall of 2013, the Live Love Dream collection (LLD) was added to Aéropostale stores. Live Love Dream features lounge and activewear geared to girls. The company also offered a secondary brand called Jimmy'Z that focused on surf and skater clothing. The 14 stores were branded as more upscale with higher price points than its parent chain. The company closed all Jimmy'Z in fiscal 2009.

Aéropostale currently has the following brands for girls: Free State, Hobie, Invite Only, Junie & Jade, Lorimer, Map to Mars, The Bikini Lab, United XXVI. And for boys: Free State, United XXVI.

== Competition ==
Aéropostale mainly competes with other outfitters, Abercrombie & Fitch and its subsidiary retailer Hollister Co., and American Eagle Outfitters as well as a few smaller brands. Aéropostale's younger brand, P.S. from Aéropostale, competed with brands such as A&F's younger subsidiary Abercrombie Kids and, formerly, American Eagle's 77kids.

== Promotions ==
In 2007, the company began doing promotions with successful figures to increase brand awareness, and since 2008 started to collaborate with non-profit organisations and artists.

== Legal issues ==
- Executive Vice President and Chief Merchandising Officer Christopher Finazzo was terminated in November 2006 after an investigation by the Board of Directors revealed that he had concealed and failed to disclose personal and business interests with South Bay Apparel, a major vendor. The SEC issued an investigation on the Finazzo matter in January 2008. A criminal indictment was unsealed and announced June 11, 2010 in U.S. Court in Brooklyn, NY charging Finazzo and Doug Dey, the owner of South Bay with wire and mail fraud conspiracy. Finazzo was convicted on 16 counts, including 14 counts of mail fraud and one each for wire fraud and conspiracy on April 25, 2013.

=== 2016 bankruptcy ===
After thirteen consecutive quarters of losses, the company was delisted from the New York Stock Exchange on April 22, 2016, and began trading under the symbol "AROP" as an over-the-counter stock.

Aéropostale filed for Chapter 11 bankruptcy on May 4, 2016, with assets of $354 million. The company closed 113 of its 739 U.S. stores and all 41 (in addition to 20 already closed prior to the filing) in Canada, the majority of which were unprofitable and responsible for the company's losses.

The company exited bankruptcy in September 2016, after a $243 million bid from a consortium of licensing firm Authentic Brands Group, mall operators Simon Property Group and General Growth Properties, and capital-investment firms Gordon Brothers and Hilco Merchant Resources. By January 2017, Aéropostale had reopened over 500 stores under its new management. Aéropostale products returned to Canada in 2019, through boutiques in Bluenotes stores and a dedicated online shop.

Following the acquisition in 2017, the company transferred its design, production and distribution license in Europe to the London-based LDN Fashion Design group. It has an annual turnover of almost 1.5 billion dollars (2020) and 1,000 stores in the Americas.

== See also ==
- Forever 21 (now online only and through JCPenney)
- Gap Inc.
  - Old Navy
- Pacific Sunwear
- Retail apocalypse
  - List of retailers affected by the retail apocalypse
