= Brooks Brothers =

American clothing retailer

Coordinates: 40.754445°N 73.97856°W

Brooks Brothers Inc.
- Formerly: H. & D. H. Brooks & Co. (1818–1850)
- Type: Subsidiary
- Industry: Retail
- Genre: Fashion
- Founded: April 7, 1818; 208 years ago
- Founder: Henry Sands Brooks
- Headquarters: 1180 Madison Avenue, New York City, U.S.
- Number of locations: 170 (2021)
- Products: Luxury clothing; accessories; home furnishings
- Owner: Authentic Brands Group
- Parent: SPARC Group (2020–2025); Catalyst Brands (2025–present)
- Website: brooksbrothers.com brooksbrothers.eu

Brooks Brothers Inc. is the oldest American apparel brand in continuous operation in the United States of America, having been founded in 1818 in New York. Originally a family business, as of 2025 it is owned by Catalyst Brands, along with JCPenney, Aéropostale, Eddie Bauer, Lucky Brand Jeans, and Nautica. Brooks Brothers imports clothing for men, women and children, and licenses its name and branding to Luxottica for eyewear, Interparfums for fragrances, and Turko Textiles for its home collection.

== History ==
=== Founding and 19th century ===
On April 7, 1818, at the age of 45, Henry Sands Brooks opened H. & D. H. Brooks & Co. on the northeast corner of Catherine St and Cherry St in Manhattan. He proclaimed that his guiding principle was, "To make and deal only in merchandise of the finest body, to sell it at a fair profit, and to deal with people who seek and appreciate such merchandise." In 1833, his four sons, Elisha, Daniel, Edward, and John, inherited the family business and in 1850 renamed the company "Brooks Brothers."

The Golden Fleece symbol was adopted as the company's trademark in 1850. A wooly sheep suspended in a ribbon had long been a symbol of British woolen merchants. Dating from the fifteenth century, the image had been the emblem of the Knights of the Golden Fleece, founded by Philip the Good, Duke of Burgundy.

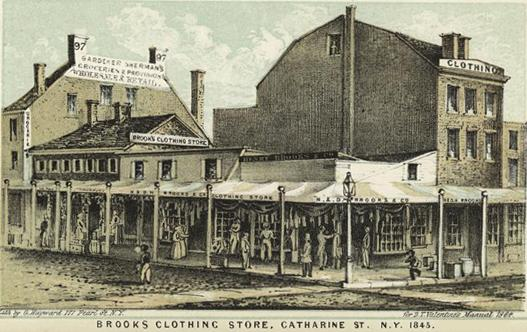
The first Brooks clothier store, at Catharine Street in Manhattan, 1845

In its early history, Brooks Brothers was known for introducing the ready-to-wear suit to American customers. In the mid-nineteenth century, Brooks Brothers outfitted United States president Abraham Lincoln and considered him a loyal customer. At his second inauguration, Lincoln wore a coat specially crafted for him by Brooks Brothers. Hand-stitched into the coat's lining was a design featuring an eagle and the inscription, "One Country, One Destiny". He was wearing the coat and a Brooks Brothers suit when he was assassinated.

New York state troops were outfitted with Brooks Brothers uniforms during the American Civil War. Brooks Brothers took shredded and sometimes decaying rags, glued them together and stitched them into uniforms. They would fall apart in the rain and were the subject of ridicule from other regiments. According to James Murray (primary editor of the Oxford English Dictionary from 1879 until his death in 1915) Brooks Brothers were responsible for bringing "shoddy" into American usage.

=== 20th century ===
The last member of the Brooks family to head the company was Winthrop Holley Brooks, who ran the company from 1935 until its sale in 1946, when the company was acquired by Julius Garfinckel & Co. Although Winthrop Brooks remained with the company as a figurehead after the acquisition, John C. Wood became the director of Brooks Brothers. Just prior to that, Wood had been the carrier of the papers for the Dumbarton Oaks Conference. Under the leadership of Wood, Brooks Brothers became even more traditional. Wood notably stated "They call us conservative, but we think that our styles are simply lacking the bizarre. We deal in what a man should wear, not what some women think he should wear." In 1915 the company opened what would become its flagship store and headquarters at 346 Madison Avenue in New York.

Brooks Brothers logo, ca. 1969

During much of the 20th Century, a subsidiary of Brooks Brothers, the Brooks Costume Company, provided costumes to the Ringling Bros. and Barnum & Bailey Circus.

By 1971, eleven Brooks Brothers stores were in operation and located in Manhattan, Chicago, Boston, San Francisco, Pittsburgh, Los Angeles, Atlanta, Washington, D.C., and St. Louis as an integral part of the retail conglomerate Garfinckel, Brooks Brothers, Miller & Rhoads, Inc., that held the company until 1981 when it was acquired by Allied Stores.

Ralph Lauren began his career as a salesman at the Brooks Brothers Madison Avenue store. Brooks Brothers later sued Polo Ralph Lauren to retain its rights to the original polo button-down collar shirt.

Brooks Brothers was acquired by the British firm Marks & Spencer in 1988. In the mid-1990s, the company's executives removed the signature Golden Fleece logo from the brand's cotton knit polo shirts, though it was later restored.

In 1998, Brooks Brothers launched its official website.

=== 21st century ===
In 2001, Marks & Spencer sold Brooks Brothers to Retail Brand Alliance (RBA), now known as The Brooks Brothers Group, a company privately owned by Italian billionaire Claudio Del Vecchio (son of Luxottica founder Leonardo del Vecchio). Along with Brooks Brothers, RBA comprised Carolee, a designer of jewelry for department stores and specialty stores. In 2007, RBA sold its high-end women's brand Adrienne Vittadini.

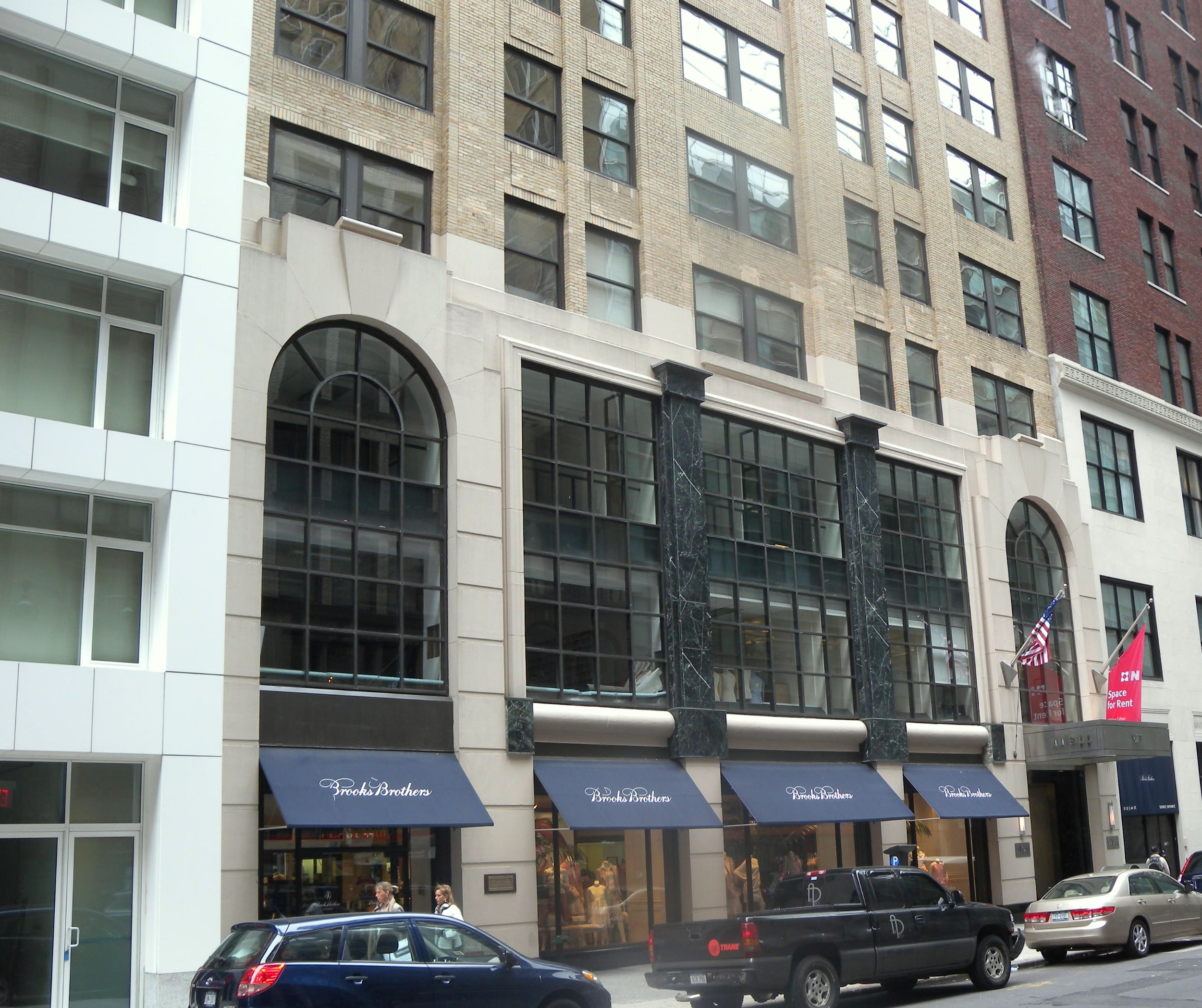
Brooks Brothers at 7 East 44th Street in Manhattan

In September 2007, Brooks Brothers's then CEO, Claudio Del Vecchio, announced the unveiling of a high-end collection of men's and women's wear named Black Fleece. Del Vecchio announced that the first star guest designer for the new collection would be New York menswear designer Thom Browne. Black Fleece received so much critical and commercial success that Brooks Brothers opened a stand-alone Black Fleece boutique on Bleecker Street in the Winter of 2008. However the line used a confusing sizing range (such as size "BB 0") and was discontinued in 2015. Brooks Brothers next released a line of clothing catering to Asian clientele.

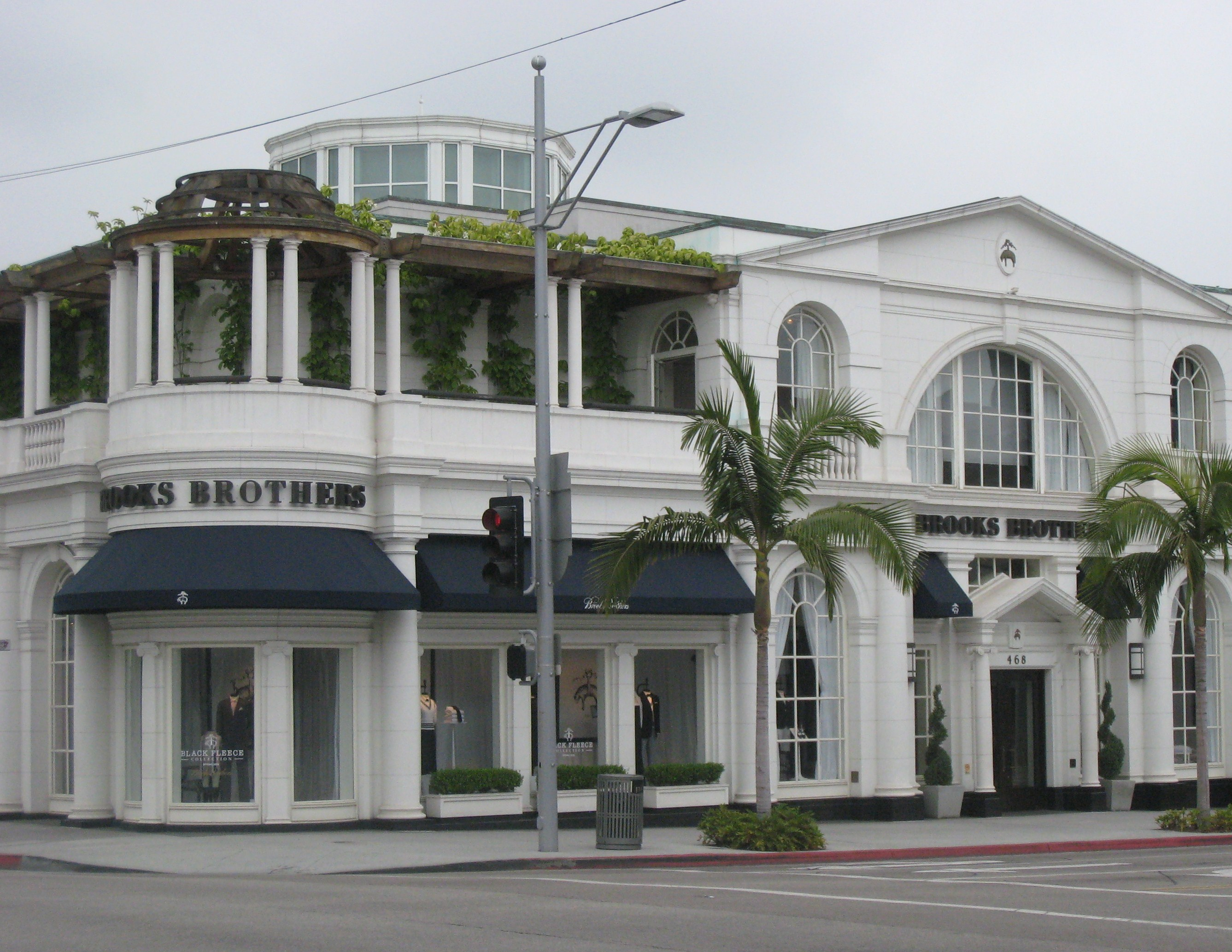
Brooks Brothers store on Rodeo Drive in Beverly Hills, California

In 2008, the company began an extensive renovation of its flagship store at 346 Madison Avenue. In January 2009, Brooks Brothers closed a smaller location at Fifth Avenue and 53rd Street in Manhattan.

In April 2010, Brooks Brothers launched a line of luxury home furnishings which includes bedding, bath towels, as well as living room décor and entertaining accessories. That year, they also launched their 1818 Signature fragrance.

As of 2015, there were 210 Brooks Brothers stores in the United States and 70 in other countries, including Australia, India, Hong Kong, Taiwan, Korea, Japan, China, France, Spain, the United Kingdom, Chile, Canada, Panama, Italy, the Philippines, Poland, Mexico, UAE, Peru, Singapore, Switzerland, Indonesia, Malaysia, Greece, and Vietnam. Most of its clothing was imported, but some suits, sport coats, shirts and accessories were manufactured in the United States. Many of its mid-range "1818" line of suits were manufactured at Brooks Brothers' Southwick plant in Haverhill, Massachusetts. All Brooks Brothers necktie silk was woven in England or Italy, and the ties were still are "cut and piled" at the Brooks Brothers' tie factory in Long Island City, New York. Brooks also had a series of books on etiquette and manners for ladies and gentlemen. The Garland Shirt Company produced the Brooks Brothers' iconic twill button-down oxford. Its higher-end label was the Golden Fleece line which features suits that are tailored in the United States.

Between 2017 and 2019, sales stagnated at around $1 billion due to business fashion turning more casual and online competition. In May 2020, it was reported that Brooks Brothers was seeking a buyer. Reports also suggest the company was exploring a bankruptcy filing. In June, the company proposed closing its three American factories, "a dramatic move for a brand that has really hung their hat on 'Made in America.'" Del Vecchio, who was responsible for acquiring the factory in Massachusetts, said at the time that the U.S. factories never made any money and that the brand carried a debt of less than $300 million.

On July 8, 2020, it was reported the company was filing for Chapter 11 bankruptcy primarily due to the economic impact of the COVID-19 pandemic. Brooks Brothers planned to close 51 of its 250 locations in North America. The closures included the flagship Madison Avenue store which never reopened. Its inventory was moved to other locations and the building was listed for sale the following year.

In September 2020 Brooks Brothers was purchased by a joint venture between Authentic Brands Group and Simon Property Group. The new owners committed to continue operating at least 125 Brooks Brothers retail locations in the US, and more worldwide (down from 424 global locations before the COVID-19 pandemic). The transaction was completed in September 2020. Ken Ohashi was appointed as President and Chief Executive Officer in September 2020.

On December 1, 2020, designer Michael Bastian was named as the brand's creative director. In late 2023 a new affordable line was introduced, "B by Brooks Brothers", and sold through Macy's.

On 24 April 2024, Ted Baker Canada, the operator of Brooks Brothers stores in Canada, filed for creditor protection in Canada and Chapter 15 bankruptcy in the US. The company blamed the operation suppliers of Authentic Brands Group for failure to pay. As a result, it was announced that all Brooks Brothers stores in Canada would close.

In May 2025, Brooks Brothers opened a new flagship store in the Lower Manhattan neighborhood where the first store opened in 1818 at Catherine and Cherry Streets. The new 10,000 square-foot, 2-story flagship store at 195 Broadway features historical Brooks Brothers pieces such as the glasses worn by founder Henry Sands Brooks and a recreation of the coat Abraham Lincoln wore at his inauguration.

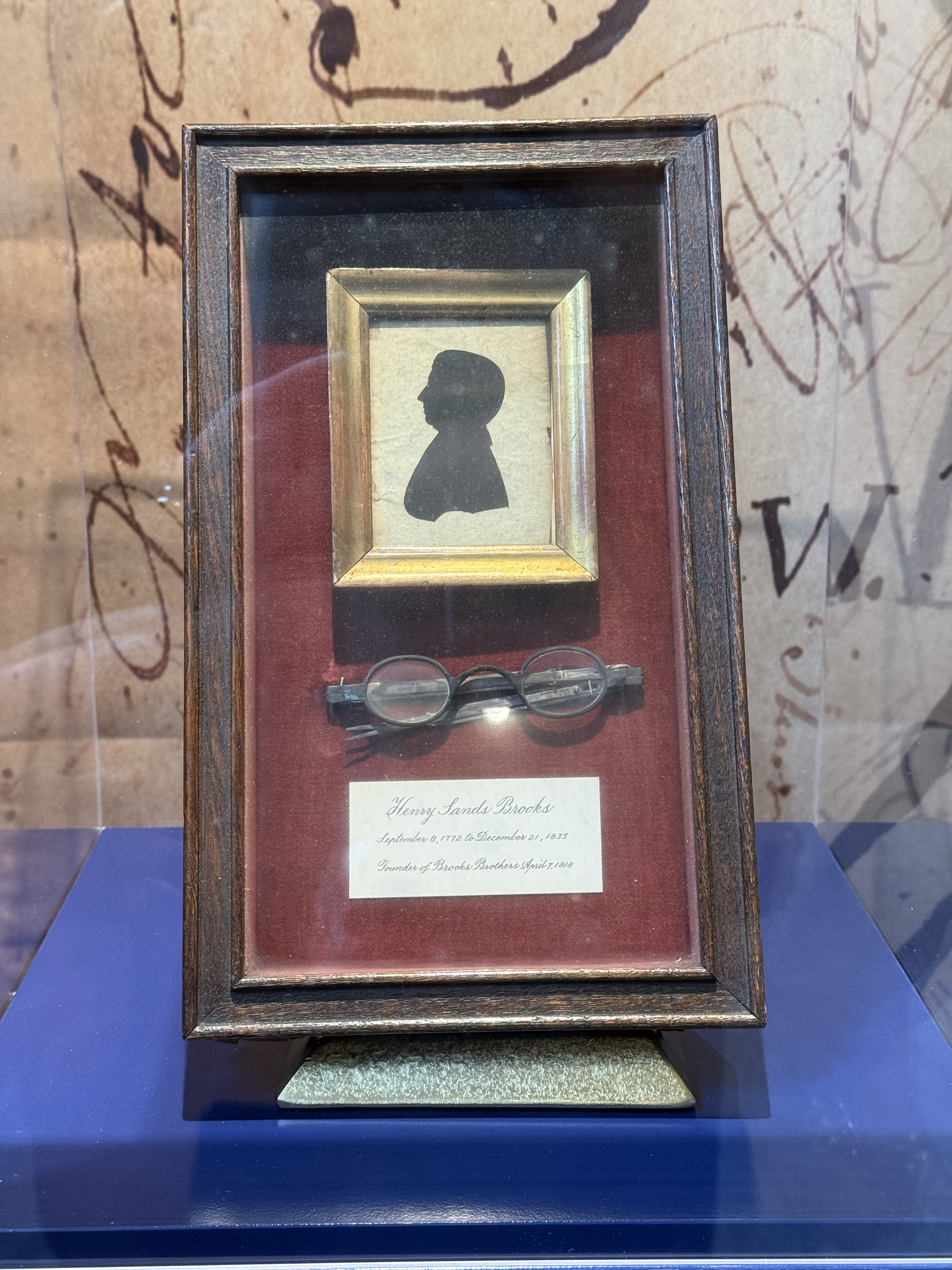
Glasses worn by founder Henry Sands Brooks at the Brooks Brothers flagship store.

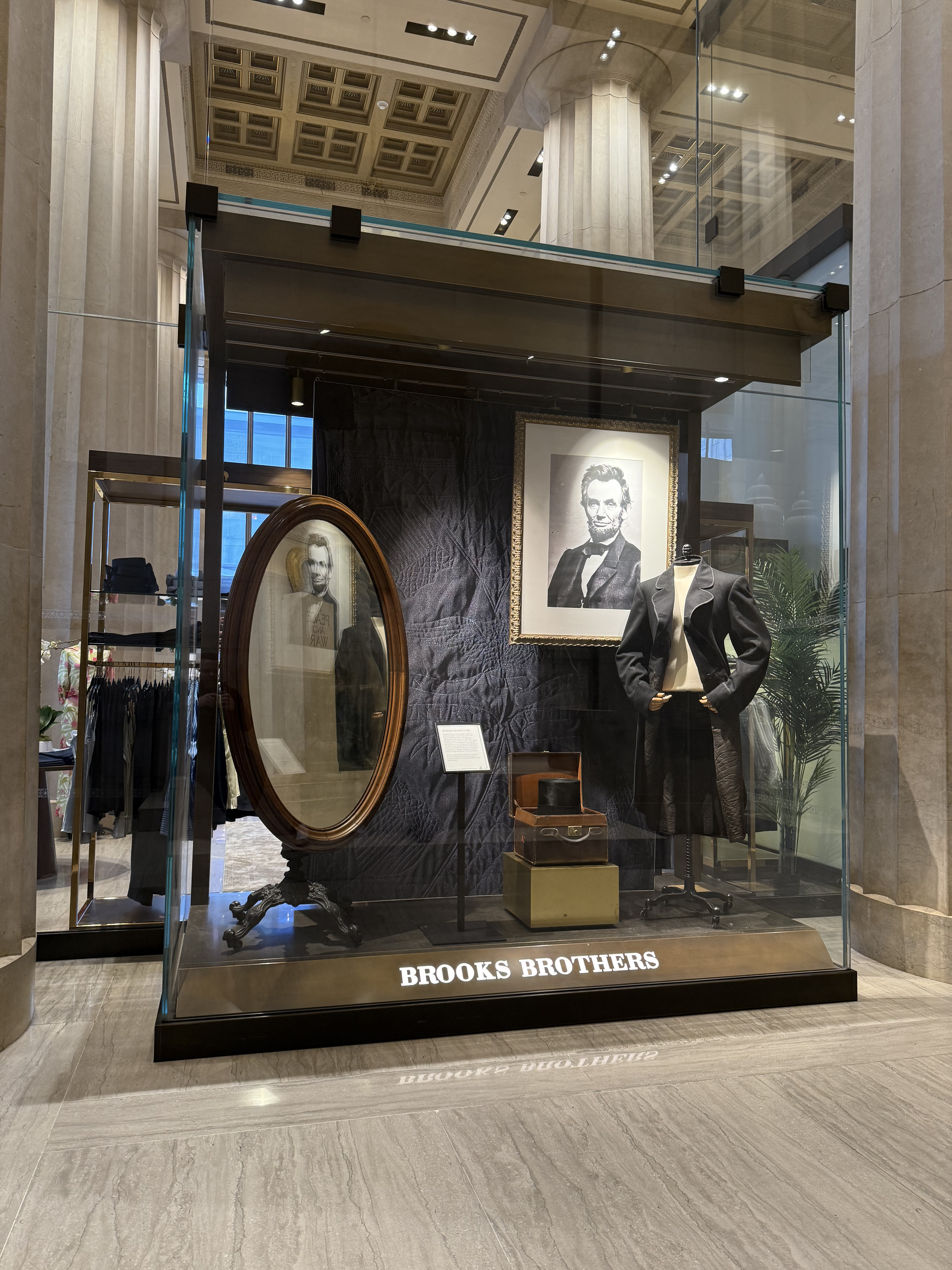
Lincoln exhibit at the Brooks Brothers flagship store including a replica of his inaugural coat.

== Innovations ==
Brooks Brothers introduced many clothing advances to the American market throughout its history as a leader in the American menswear industry.

- Brooks Brothers largely created the ready-to-wear clothing market, beginning in 1849.
- In 1896, John E. Brooks, the grandson of Henry Sands Brooks, applied button-down collars to dress shirts after having seen them on English polo players.
- English foulard ties were introduced by Francis G. Lloyd in the 1890s before he was made president of the corporation.
- The American "sack suit", which became a staple of the Ivy League style, was introduced by Brooks Brothers in 1895.
- Brooks Brothers popularized pink as a color for men's dress shirts, suggesting it be worn with charcoal-gray suits.
- Shetland sweater, introduced in 1904
- Harris Tweed, introduced to the fashion marketplace in 1909
- Polo coat about 1910
- Madras, introduced from India via Brooks Brothers to the public in 1902
- Argyle socks: in 1957, Brooks Brothers became the first American retailer to manufacture the article for men
- Light-weight summer suits: the first lightweight summer suits made of cotton corduroy and seersucker were introduced by Brooks during the early 1930s
- Wash-and-wear shirts: in 1953, the store pioneered the manufacture of wash-and-wear shirts using a blend of Dacron, polyester, and cotton that was invented by Ruth R. Benerito, which they called "Brooksweave"
- Non-iron 100% cotton dress shirt, 1998

Brooks Brothers did not make an off-the-rack black suit between 1865 and 2003. For many years, a myth circulated that the reason the company did not make black suits was out of deference to Abraham Lincoln, who wore a bespoke black Brooks frock coat, a gift from the company, when he was assassinated. It is not clear if this policy was the result or cause of the traditional American fashion rule that black suits in daytime for men are proper only for servants and when honoring the deceased.

== Notable customers ==
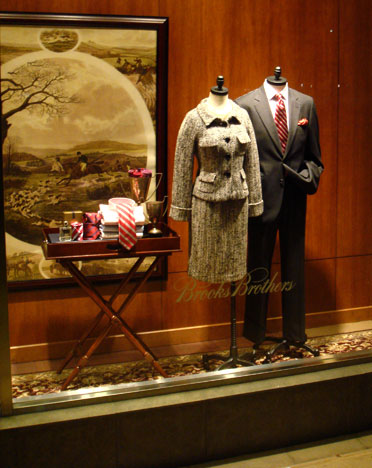
A 2007 display in a Brooks Brothers store

=== Sports ===
Brooks Brothers is a sponsor and the official suit designers and distributors of Italian football club Inter Milan. From 2010 to 2019, the company was a sponsor and official apparel supplier of the Head of the Charles Regatta.

=== Public officials ===
Brooks Brothers has outfitted every American president since James Madison, with the exceptions of Jimmy Carter and Ronald Reagan.

In 1865, President Abraham Lincoln wore a custom-made Brooks Brothers frock coat to his Second inauguration. Lincoln later wore the same frock coat on the evening of his assassination. Several generals including Ulysses S. Grant, William Sherman, Joseph Hooker and Philip Sheridan purchased uniforms from Brooks Brothers.

In 1881, after becoming vice-president of the United States, Chester A. Arthur went on a Brooks Brothers shopping spree. Presidents Ulysses S. Grant, Woodrow Wilson, and Theodore Roosevelt all wore Brooks Brothers to their respective inaugurations as well.

In 1945, President Franklin D. Roosevelt wore Brooks Brothers while on his way to meet Joseph Stalin and Winston Churchill at the Yalta Conference.

In 1963, President John F. Kennedy was wearing a Brooks Brothers' grey suit when he was assassinated.

In 2009, President Barack Obama wore a Brooks Brothers coat, scarf, and gloves during his inauguration in 2009 (this coat was later re-worn by Obama to Trump's inauguration in 2017). In 2013, during his second inauguration, Obama wore a suit designed by Martin Greenfield, paired with a white shirt from Brooks Brothers.

In 2017, President Donald Trump was inaugurated in a grey suit, white shirt, and dark blue overcoat. The white shirt and overcoat were believed to have been designed by Brooks Brothers. Melania Trump and Ivanka Trump have also been seen wearing items of clothing from Brooks Brothers at times.

In 2021, President Joe Biden broke tradition by not wearing any items from Brooks Brothers at his inauguration, instead opting for a Ralph Lauren navy suit and winter overcoat. However, Biden does wear Brooks Brothers shirts and suits. He is also known to frequent casualwear from the brand such as polos and sweaters.

French politician and former president Jacques Chirac (1932–2019) bought his shirts at the Madison Avenue shop.

== Popular culture ==
=== Music and fine arts ===
Brooks Brothers is the official clothier of the Jazz at Lincoln Center Orchestra.

Andy Warhol was known to buy and wear clothes from Brooks Brothers. According to Carlton Walters: "I got to [know] Andy quite well, and he always looked bedraggled: always had his tie lopsided, as he didn't have time to tie it, and he never tied his shoe laces, and he even wore different colored socks, but he bought all of his clothes at Brooks Brothers."

Brooks Brothers is referenced in the opening line of the lyrics to "Harvard Blues", written by George Frazier and popularized by Count Basie and Jimmy Rushing in the 1940s. The song begins with the lyric "I wear Brooks clothes and white shoes all the time" and goes on to portray the protagonist of the song as a privileged but idle bon vivant.

=== Sports ===
Brooks Brothers serves as an official partner and outfitter of the International Tennis Hall of Fame (ITHF) in Newport, Rhode Island. As part of the partnership, the brand custom-designs navy blazers that are presented to each new inductee during the annual induction ceremony held each summer.

=== Film, television, and theatre ===
The "white" shirts used for Archie Bunker's costumes in All in the Family were recut tan oxford shirts from Brooks Brothers.

Brooks Brothers supplied clothes for the television show Mad Men; in October 2009, Brooks Brothers created a limited edition "Mad Men Edition" suit with the show's costume designer.

Stephen Colbert had all of his suits for The Colbert Report and The Late Show with Stephen Colbert supplied by Brooks Brothers.

Brooks Brothers frequently is sought out by costume designers in Hollywood, dressing stars in such films as Ben Affleck in Pearl Harbor, Gene Hackman in The Royal Tenenbaums, and Will Smith in Ali. The company produced made-to-measure period costumes for Denzel Washington's The Great Debaters.

George Clooney wears Brooks Brothers throughout the film Up in the Air, and scenes were shot in a Brooks Brothers airport store. The men of the film The Adjustment Bureau wear Brooks Brothers. In November 2011, Brooks Brothers announced that it had designed a custom wardrobe for Kermit the Frog for the movie The Muppets. The stars of Slumdog Millionaire were all dressed by Brooks Brothers for the 81st Academy Awards.

Brooks Brothers made all of the men's costumes, more than 500 pieces, for the 2013 adaptation of The Great Gatsby. They also sponsored the premieres in New York City and Cannes Film Festival. This was followed by a limited edition collection designed with Catherine Martin and sold at Brooks Brothers stores around the world.

Chuck Bass and Nate Archibald on the Gossip Girl TV series frequently wear clothes from Brooks Brothers.

Alec Baldwin's titular character in the 1994 film The Shadow was complimented on his Brooks Brothers tie by his adversary Shiwan Khan. At their next meeting, Khan is dressed in Brooks Brothers clothing.

In the 2020 film Tenet, when John David Washington meets Michael Caine for lunch at a posh London members' club, Caine's character dismissively states: "Brooks Brothers won't cut it."

=== Fiction ===
The lead character Lestat de Lioncourt in Anne Rice's Vampire Chronicles often describes himself wearing suits by Brooks Brothers.

Mary McCarthy's short story "The Man in the Brooks Brothers Shirt," which can be found in her collection The Company she keeps, 1942, is one of the more famous literary references to the Brooks Brothers.

Writers John O'Hara, Somerset Maugham and J. P. Marquand incorporated Brooks Brothers into their stories as a means to draw out character traits.

Richard Yates not only wore Brooks Brothers clothing throughout his life, but he often referred to the brand in his writing, including in A Good School, in which one of the characters tries to hang himself with a Brooks Brothers belt.

Writer Tom Wolfe makes repeated mentions of Brooks Brothers in his essays on style and status.

In Kathryn Stockett's novel The Help, Skeeter wears one of her father's Brooks Brothers shirts.

Stuyvesant, the Director of the Secret Service in Lee Child's novel Without Fail only wears Brooks Brothers suits.

=== Collaborations ===
In 2022, Brooks Brothers collaborated with French swimwear brand Vilebrequin on a limited-edition capsule collection featuring swim-ready prints drawn from the Brooks Brothers archive.

Brooks Brothers partnered with tennis equipment brand Prince on a limited-edition capsule collection drawing on both brands' associations with tennis and American heritage.

In 2025, Brooks Brothers collaborated with New York-based label Engineered Garments, founded by Daiki Suzuki. The capsule reinterpreted pieces from Brooks Brothers' Black Fleece Collection—originally designed by creative director Michael Bastian—through the lens of Engineered Garments' military and workwear influences, resulting in an oversized tuxedo jacket, wide-leg fatigue trousers with side stripes, and three shirts in varied fabrications.

Also in 2025, Brooks Brothers partnered with Los Angeles-based streetwear label Brain Dead on a spring/summer capsule collection, their second collaboration. The collection applied Brain Dead's graphic sensibility to classic Brooks Brothers wardrobe staples, updating the brand's traditional menswear foundations with contemporary design elements.

== See also ==
- J. Press
- Paul Stuart
- Ralph Lauren
- Izod
- J. Crew
- Thom Browne
- Hickey Freeman
- Joseph Abboud
- Retail apocalypse
- List of retailers affected by the retail apocalypse
