= Rigging monkey =

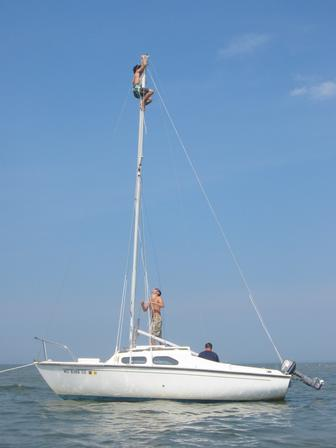
A rigging monkey making repairs to a small boat

A rigging monkey is a crewmember of a sailing vessel whose primary responsibility is to climb the mast, usually with the assistance of a boatswain's chair, to work on the rigging of the ship.

The rigging monkey would be sent aloft to repair damaged sails, straighten out lines that had become "fouled", or tangled, or to assist in the raising or lowering of sails.

In the days of tall-ship sailing, the nautical term "monkey" was used to refer to anything of small size on the ship. Jackets or coats that were cut to a shorter length to allow freedom of movement in the rigging were called monkey jackets, which were worn by the rigging monkey. Similarly, the term powder monkey was used for small boys that would run black powder from the powder room to the cannons on the ship, as their small size allowed them to negotiate the narrow passages within the ship.

The term still applies to modern sailors who climb their masts to make repairs to their rigs. Safety precautions, such as wearing a harness or sitting in a boatswain's chair (a fabric seat that is tied to a halyard) are standard procedure, especially on larger boats.

== See also ==
- Able seaman
- Steel monkey
