= Yankees HOPE Week =

New York Yankees program

Logo for Yankees HOPE Week

Yankees HOPE Week (Helping Others Persevere & Excel Week) is an annual program run by the New York Yankees that celebrates "individuals, families, or organizations worthy of support". Every Yankees player participates in the program with the "goal [of] personally connect[ing] with individuals in the settings of their greatest personal accomplishments." It was started in 2009 "with the purpose of performing acts of goodwill to provide encouragement to more than just the recipient of the gesture." It takes place every year in the summer.

== History ==
HOPE Week was started in 2009. The Yankees said "this event is unique in that every player on the roster, along with Manager Joe Girardi, will participate."

=== 2009 ===
In 2009, the program, which ran from July 20–24, honored a United States Army veteran of the 82nd Airborne Division who lost use of his arms and legs to Lou Gehrig's disease (ALS). The veteran and his wife and son were invited to watch batting practice from the field before the game. They were surprised by a party in a suite in Yankee Stadium with several players and their friends and family.

Several Yankees surprised two men who overcame learning and developmental diseases at their place of work at a law firm in New York, where they are mail room employees. Other Yankees visited a sixth-grade Little Leaguer who has cerebral palsy but helps coach his team. After the July 24th game, the Yankees hosted a nighttime carnival for people from Camp Sundown, which is for those who have Xeroderma Pigmentosum, a rare disease in which the body cannot repair cells damaged by UV light; those affected have to avoid exposure to sunlight. The kids arrived at the game after sundown, but because of a rain delay, the game had not started, so they saw the game and did the event with the Yankees until sunrise.

=== 2010 ===
The 2010 program ran from August 16–20. Manager Joe Girardi visited Jane Lang, a blind woman who attends about 30 Yankees game a season, at her home and invited her to meet the players at that evening's game. A man from Sierra Leone, who has provided for his family since he was eight, immigrated to the U.S., and received a scholarship to go to college threw out the ceremonial first pitch before a game, while a 13-year-old quadruple amputee was thrown a pool party with several Yankees.

=== 2011 ===
In 2011, the Yankees held a barbecue with children from Tuesday's Children, an organization that supports children who lost parents on September 11th. Several Yankees (including Derek Jeter, Jorge Posada, and CC Sabathia) took survivors of the 2010 Haiti earthquake on a tour of New York City and met Archbishop Timothy Dolan. Other Yankees went to a Broadway performance by a 27-year-old who survived five brain aneurysms.

=== 2021 ===
In 2021, 70 year old Gwen Goldman became Honorary Bat Girl for the New York Yankees during HOPE Week after the general manager learned about her rejection to play for the Yankees 60 years ago because she was a girl.
