= Henry Sands Brooks =

American clothier and businessman

- Born: September 8, 1772
- Died: December 21, 1833 (aged 61)
- Resting place: Sands Point Cemetery
- Occupations: Clothier & Businessman
- Spouse: Lavinia Brooks
- Children: 9

Henry Sands Brooks (September 8, 1772 – December 21, 1833) was an American clothier and businessman. He founded the company that would eventually become Brooks Brothers. His 4 sons (Daniel, John, Elisha, and Edward) transformed the company into Brooks Brothers the oldest surviving clothing firm in the United States which began the trend of the ready-made suit.

== Early life ==
Henry Sands Brooks was born on September 8, 1772, in Queens New York. His parents were David Brooks and Hannah Brooks (maiden name Sands). His parents married on November 30, 1770, with David being twenty-two and Hannah at fifteen years old. Dr. David Brooks was a physician whose practice was in New York on the northwest Corner of Cherry Street and Catherine Street. He died on October 14, 1795, at the age of 47 from yellow fever.

Henry was the oldest of four siblings. His younger brother David was born around 1774, a second brother John's birthdate is unknown, with sister Ann born on October 25, 1778. Henry married Lavinia Brooks (maiden name Lyon) and they had nine children, six boys and three girls between the years 1802–1821. His six sons names are David (1804–1805), Henry A., Daniel Hamilton, John, Elisha, and Edward Brooks. Henry's daughters were named Ann, Hannah, and Lorreto Brooks.

Henry Sands Brooks started off selling groceries several years prior to owning his business at the same address he grew up in. Soon, the War of 1812 interrupted his provisional trade leading Henry to leave his profession and retired to an upstate farm in Rye. Once the war was over Henry went to work with his younger brother David Brooks in his clothing business on Cherry Street for a couple years. In 1817, Henry dissolved the partnership with his brother and moved a few blocks down to the corner of Cherry Street and Catherine Street in Manhattan.

== Founding Brooks Brothers ==
At 45 years old on April 7, 1818, Henry bought the corner store on Cherry and Catherine Street for $15,250 which officially began his business known as H. & D.H. Brooks & Co. At the time of this purchase, surprisingly, neither Henry, nor his brother David, nor any of Henry's five sons knew how to make a suit. They did know, however, how to make money selling suits made by others the Brooks family hired to make them.

A year after Henry's purchase of the corner store on Cherry and Catherine Street the New York journeymen tailors strikes happened in 1819. Henry soon decided to have his clothes made by 90% women in his Catherine and Cherry Street store. Women sewed specific types of clothing shirts, drawers, and cheap nankeen trousers. Other tailoring like surtouts was seen as specialized labor reserved for men. This may lead to assumptions of unfair gender wages; however, Henry paid both men and women the same. The divergence of labor may lead to assumptions of disparate wages for men versus women, as was the custom of the time.

Henry sold a wide range of ready-made clothing products at his store where he specialized in pea coats, monkey jackets, duck trousers, and smocks while also offering a grand selection of pantaloons, waistcoats, custom made colorful coats with bright gilt buttons, and knee breeches. Even with such a specialization of outfits, Henry, unlike other competitors such as Burk and Whitmarsh at the time, sold his products for far cheaper while still retaining fair quality. Henry's prices were normally around $15 to get a nice coat unlike the Broadway competition selling around $22–32 for a cheap coat. Henry's materials were made from cheaper cotton and mixed cloths that were identified as city's less genteel elements. Regardless, Henry was taking advantage of the same business practices as his competition even if they had more refined materials. With so much success in 1825 he opened his second store two blocks away next to James Slip, and by now his original store is now profiting $50 thousand a year.

With such low prices on outfits Henry's market of easy ready-made clothes were a hit for many. With many of the consumers being those who were too busy or too budget-conscious to engage a personal tailor, they would instead buy one of Henry's ready-mades. By having Henry's staff make the clothes ahead of time, customers were able to have a ready-made outfit right after purchasing it the same day they walked into the store. With the idea that cheapness, and at the same time a certain elegance, were both needed of those self-consciously outfitted paragons who were a part of the market revolution.

Beyond just Henry's business he owned numerous properties besides the two main locations for his business. The Longworth Directory of 1828-1829 shows Henry Sands Brooks owning multiple residences for family members and his business. Buildings 80 and 116 were on Cherry Street being the two main addresses for H. & D.H. Brooks & Co. and his home with Lavinia Brooks was 159 on the same street. Henry owned his mother's home who lived on 97 on Catherine Street and his brother David's home on 148.

=== Henry's death and exchange of ownership ===
In 1833, Henry Sands Brooks passed the ownership of his business to his eldest son Henry A. Brooks. Later the same year on December 21, 1833, Henry Sands Brooks died at 61 years old being buried at Sands Point North Hempstead, Nassau New York. In 1850 Henry A. Brooks passed on the business to his 4 younger brothers and died later that year on May 5, 1850, at 43 years old. The four brothers who took ownership of the business after Henry A. Brooks were Daniel Hamilton Brooks, John Brooks, Elisha Brooks, and Edward Brooks.

With the death of the founder Henry Sands Brooks, Henry's four sons decided to change the company's name from H. & D.H. Brooks & Co. to Brooks Brothers. The decision for the name change is because of rapid growth, changes within the business, and new management. In 1854, four years after the brothers gained ownership of the company, they signed a billhead for $35 where the name H. & D.H. Brooks & Co. was official changed to Brooks Brothers.
