= Aéropostale =

Aéropostale may refer to:

- Aéropostale (clothing), an apparel retailer
- Aéropostale (aviation), formerly la Compagnie générale aéropostale, a defunct French airmail company

== See also ==
- Aeropostal Alas de Venezuela
- Airmail
