= Combination Store =

Historic storefront in San Diego, California, US

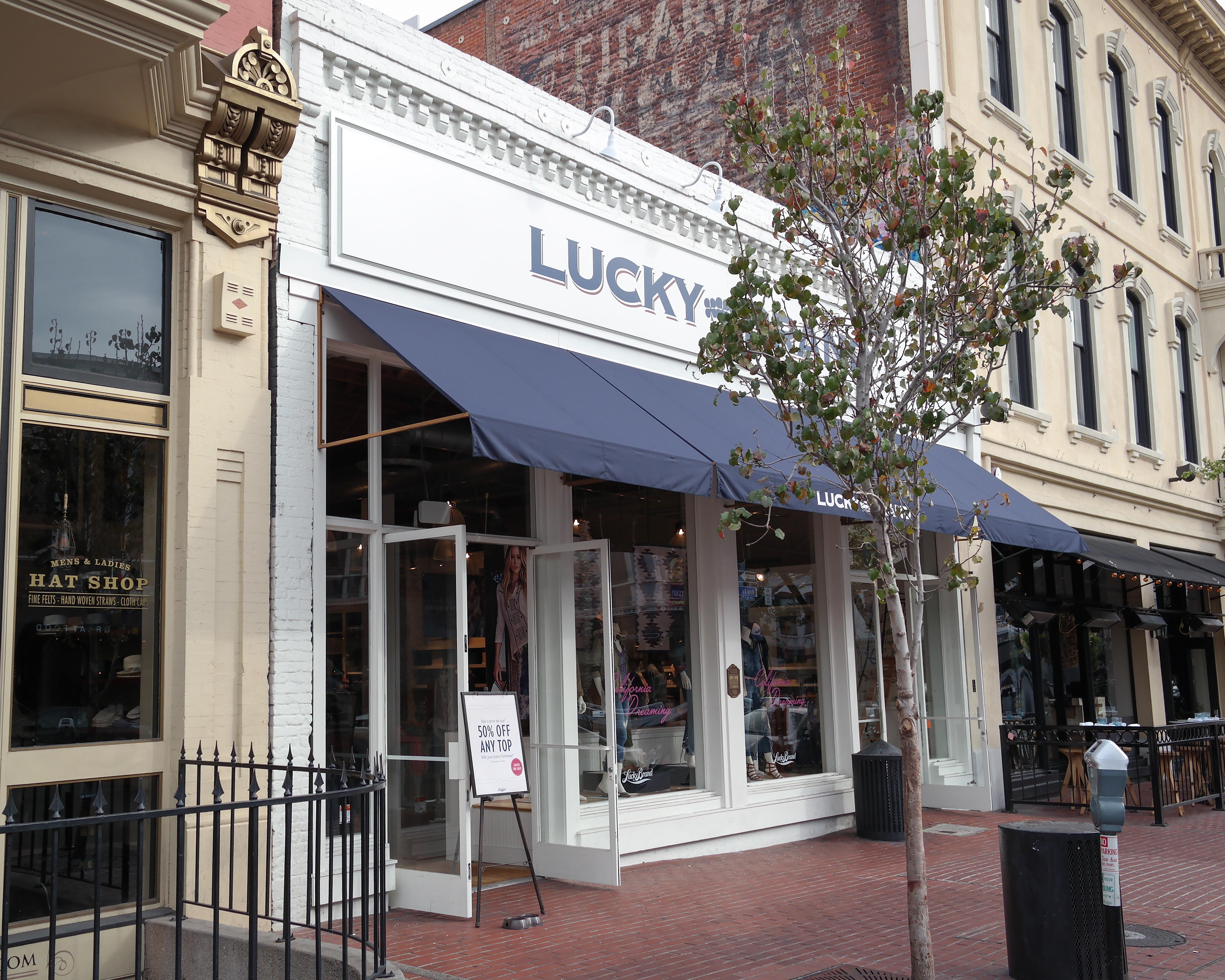
- The building's exterior in 2014
- Interactive map of the Combination Store area

General information
- Location: 621 5th Avenue, San Diego, California, United States
- Coordinates: 32.711943°N 117.159912°W

The Combination Store is a historic one-story Victorian commercial storefront and one of the oldest buildings in the Gaslamp Quarter, San Diego, California, United States. It located at 621-625 5th Avenue and was built in 1880. Businesses located here have included dry goods and clothing, clothing, shoe store, jewelry store, men’s furnishings, beverage store, cigar store, barber shops, shoeshine shop, bar and recently Lucky Brand.

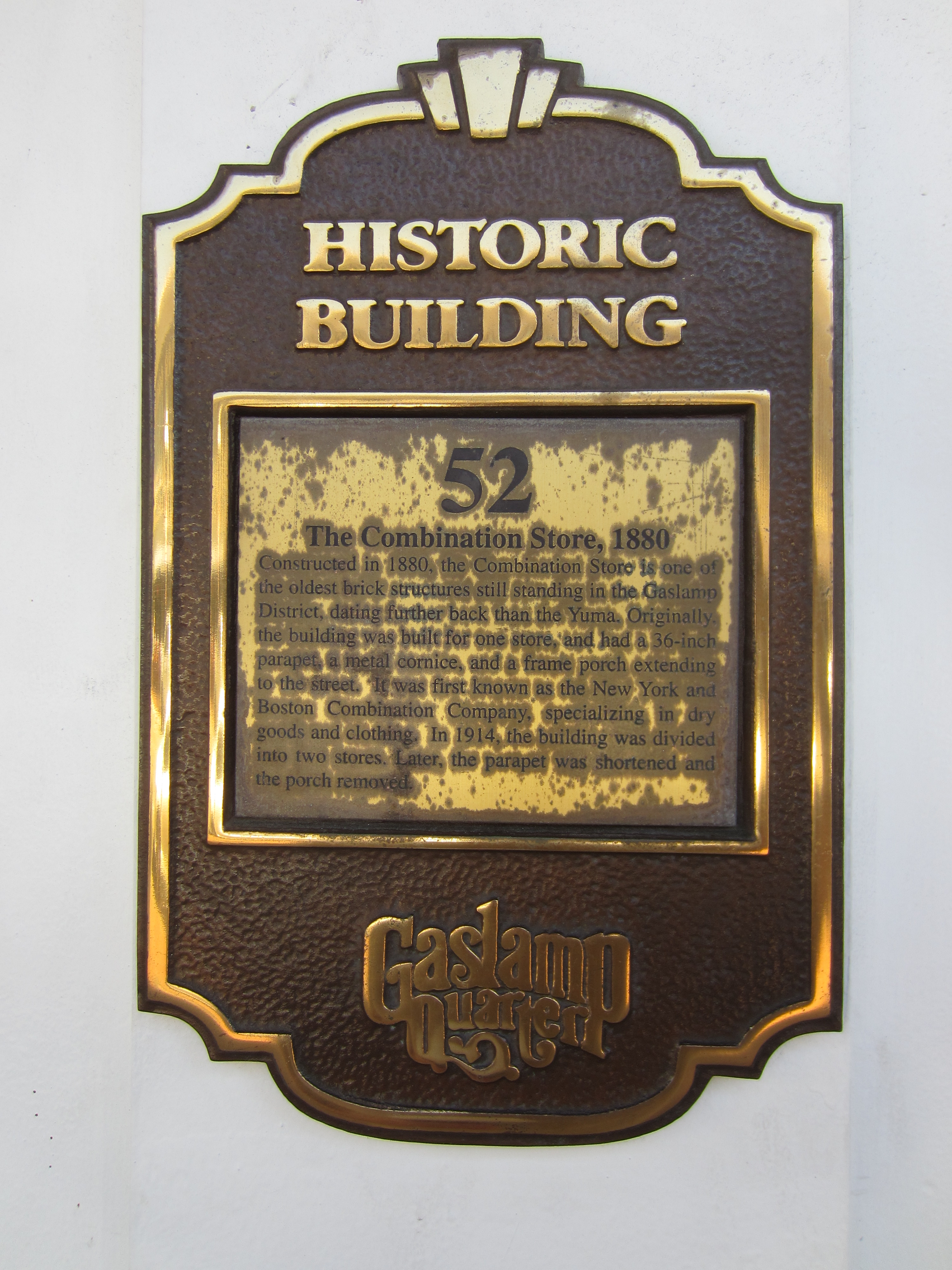
Plaque for the building, 2016

== See also ==
- List of Gaslamp Quarter historic buildings
