= David Chu (designer) =

American fashion designer

- 朱欽騏
- Born: Chu Hsin-chi; 1955 (age 70–71); Taiwan
- Education: Fashion Institute of Technology
- Occupation: Fashion designer
- Known for: Founder of Nautica

David Chu (Chinese: 朱欽騏; pinyin: Zhū Qīnqí; born 1955) is an American fashion designer and the founder of Nautica, a men's outerwear and sportswear company.

== Early life and education ==
Chu's family immigrated from Taiwan to the United States in the 1960s and opened a Chinese restaurant. He grew up in New York and Connecticut and originally planned to become an architect. While taking a summer drawing class at the Fashion Institute of Technology (FIT), a professor suggested that Chu try designing clothes, after seeing his drawing skills. Chu later graduated from FIT, and was named its STAR alumnus in 1996.

== Career ==
Chu returned home to Taipei to start an export business with friends, but they lost all their money in one and a half years. He then returned to the United States, and working under a large company, he designed jackets, taking inspiration from sailors' coats. Barneys and Bloomingdales had good sales for the designs, and in 1983 Nautica was born. The company had sales of $700,000 in its first year and $2.5 million the following year.

In 2003, Chu sold the company for $1 billion to VF Corporation. He made $100 million from the sale. Chu promptly purchased an 1846 townhouse in Manhattan's Flatiron District, gut-renovated the historic mansion and turned it into his design studio, showroom and offices.

In 2006, he created the exclusive David Chu Bespoke line, offering custom suits hand-made in Italy with fabrics from the world's finest mills. The bespoke line is available in a richly-appointed atelier located in the penthouse of the "Townhouse."

In 2010, he started another label, a designer sportswear collection called "LINCS by David Chu," that offered a modern take on tradition and the well-lived life. Previously, LINCS was available at select Lord & Taylor, The Bay, Dillard's, Nordstrom, the BAY Oakridge in Vancouver, and other specialty stores.

From 2006 to 2009, Chu was the executive creative director at luggage and accessories maker Tumi Inc.

In July 2009, Chu formed partnership with golf player Jack Nicklaus to develop the Nicklaus brands worldwide.

In November 2012, Chu bought Danish brand Georg Jensen A/S with Investcorp. He became Chairman of the board and Creative Director after the purchase. Georg Jensen was subsequent sold and is currently owned by Fiskars. As of 2026 David Chu remains on the board of the company. https://www.lionrockcapitalhk.com/team/david-chu/

== Personal life ==
As of 2014, Chu lived in a townhouse in Flatiron, New York

== See also ==
- Taiwanese in New York City
