= Catalyst Brands =

American clothing company

Catalyst Brands LLC
- Predecessor: JCPenney; Sparc Group
- Founded: 2025; 1 year ago
- Headquarters: Plano, Texas, United States
- Parent: Simon Property Group (50%) Brookfield Corporation (50%)
- Subsidiaries: JCPenney; Brooks Brothers; Lucky Brand Jeans; Nautica; Aéropostale
- Website: catalystbrands.com

Catalyst Brands LLC is a company that was formed in 2025 by the merger of Sparc Group and JCPenney.

The company has a close relationship with Authentic Brands Group. In some business arrangements, the brand name, logo, trade dress, design patents, and other intellectual property are owned or co-owned by Authentic Brands Group while the business operations are conducted through a licensing arrangement with Catalyst Brands. For example, for the Eddie Bauer brand, the store operations were licensed to Catalyst Brands. Catalyst's Eddi Bauer subsidiary filed for Chapter 11 bankruptcy after Authentic Brands chose a different company for the brand's e-commerce operations.

Copper Retail JV LLC is a business entity formed by and under the control of Simon Property Group and Brookfield Property Partners, and Copper Bidco LLC. In December 2024, Copper Retail JV acquired 100% of the outstanding equity of Sparc Group Holdings. The acquisition brought together Copper's existing investment in department store icon JCPenney and the newly acquired operations of specialty retail brands Aéropostale, Brooks Brothers, Lucky Brand Jeans, and Nautica.

Marc Rosen, former CEO of JCPenney, leads Catalyst Brands.

In January 2026, it was reported that Eddie Bauer was preparing to file for Chapter 11 bankruptcy for the third time, as well as the liquidation and permanent closure of all of its nearly 200 stores nationwide. The company's manufacturing, e-commerce, and wholesale operations are not expected to be affected by the potential bankruptcy filing, and will continue to remain operational as the licensee transfers to a new owner, Eddie Bauer Outdoor 5, LLC. The bankruptcy filing is expected to only include Eddie Bauer and no other subsidiaries of Catalyst Brands.

== Brands ==
List of brands owned or produced by Catalyst Brands
Name	Year acquired	Year founded
Aéropostale (purchased by a group of companies including Authentic Brands Group in 2016)	2025	1987
Brooks Brothers (together with Authentic Brands Group)	2025	1818
Eddie Bauer (together with Authentic Brands Group)	2025	1920
JCPenney (together with Authentic Brands Group)	2025	1902
Lucky Brand Jeans (together with Authentic Brands Group)	2025	1990
Nautica (owned by Authentic Brands Group, produced by Catalyst)	2025	1983

== See also ==
- Authentic Brands Group
- Dead mall
- Retail apocalypse
