= Chief merchandising officer =

The chief merchandising officer (CMO) is a top-level executive employee who controls the merchandising in a company or other organization.

== Responsibilities ==
A Chief Merchandising Officer has the responsibility of overseeing a company or other organization's buying and selling activities and utilizing the information gathered to develop a plan of action toward future purchase decisions. They often make these decisions on behalf of the company and steer the direction or vision of the company's merchandise strategy by analyzing trends and purchasing needs and fulfilling them when appropriate. They may also lead the merchandising sales floor in a retail environment. The Chief Merchandising Officer is generally placed in a position of authority over a group of merchandising, purchasing, or floor display staff.

== Relationship to other executive roles ==
The chief merchandising officer (CMO) role is closely related to, but distinct from, other senior executive positions in retail and consumer-facing organizations. Unlike a chief marketing officer, who focuses on brand promotion, advertising, and customer acquisition, the chief merchandising officer is primarily responsible for product selection, pricing strategies, assortment planning, and inventory decisions that directly affect sales and profitability. The merchandising function typically emphasizes operational execution and product performance rather than external communications.
