= Nautica =

American apparel brand

- Type: Subsidiary
- Industry: Fashion
- Founded: 1983; 43 years ago
- Founder: David Chu
- Headquarters: New York City, U.S.
- Products: Apparel, Accessories, Home
- Owner: Authentic Brands Group
- Parent: Catalyst Brands
- Website: www.nautica.com

Nautica is an American apparel brand, primarily specializing in nautical style clothing and lifestyle products. It is known for its men's, women's and children's apparel and accessories, as well as homeware, watches, and fragrance. Nautica took its name from the Latin word nauticus—which comes from the Greek word ναυτικός—for naval and in Italian language nautica means seamanship.

Now owned by Authentic Brands Group (Authentic) and manufactured and marketed by Catalyst Brands, Nautica was founded in 1983 by clothing designer David Chu and a partner. The brand launched with just six pieces of men's outerwear, inspired by Chu's love of nautical style and the ocean. It was purchased for cash and stock in 1984 by State-O-Maine, a New York–based apparel company. State-O-Maine changed its name to Nautica in 1994. VF Corporation purchased Nautica in 2003.

In March 2018, Authentic announced that they would acquire Nautica from VF Corporation. The sale was completed on April 30, 2018. Since being acquired by Authentic, the brand has been repositioned downmarket as an upper mid-range brand, being priced above PVH's Izod and Ralph Lauren Corporation's Chaps brands, but well below PVH's Tommy Hilfiger and Ralph Lauren Corporation's Polo Ralph Lauren brands.

In 2020, Authentic acquired, after bankruptcy and liquidation, the Brooks Brothers brand name only, another brand specialising in the preppy fashion category. In the Authentic portfolio, Brooks Brothers name will continue to be marketed as an upscale traditional preppy brand, while Nautica will be marketed as a more affordable upper mid-price, modern athleisure brand.

In 2021, it was announced that Authentic would acquire the Izod brand from PVH, which offers several similar clothing styles to Nautica. Currently, Nautica slots above lower priced Izod and below upper priced Brooks Brothers in price.

Nautica Core offers updated classics and logo-inspired designs for everyday dressing. Nautica Competition, originally launched in the 1990s and revived in 2018, is a vintage-inspired sportswear line influenced by competitive sailing. Nautica Jeans Co. is a denim sportswear line targeting younger consumers.

== Partnerships and sponsorships ==
=== 2000s ===
In 2007, Nautica became one of charity: water's first corporate partners, launching a "Give Change to Make Change" round-up program in its retail stores. The partnership has raised over $2.5 million to fund clean water projects in developing nations.

Since 2008, Nautica has been a corporate partner of Oceana, the largest international advocacy organization focused solely on ocean conservation.

=== 2010s ===
In 2013, Nautica celebrated its 30th anniversary at New York Fashion Week with the launch of the Black Sail collection, inspired by the Antarctic expeditions of Sir Ernest Shackleton.

In January 2017, Nautica signed rapper Lil Yachty as a brand Creative Designer, collaborating on capsule collections and advertising campaigns. The partnership continued into 2018.

In December 2017, Nautica extended its long-running sponsorship of PGA Tour player Cameron Tringale — a partnership dating back to 2013 — and added PGA Tour player Michael Kim as a golf brand ambassador, with both golfers wearing Nautica's NavTech performance apparel on course.

=== 2020s ===
In October 2020, Nautica collaborated with Jaysse Lopez of Urban Necessities, a pioneer of the sneaker resale market, on a capsule collection of reimagined 1990s heritage styles featuring color blocking, heritage emblems and bold logos.

In May 2021, Nautica partnered with skatewear brand Diamond Supply Co. on a 40-piece capsule collection designed to bring "the water to the streets," combining a street aesthetic with nautical technical features. Diamond Supply founder Nicholas Tershay, a longtime Nautica fan, said he had been wearing the brand since the mid-1990s while skateboarding.

Beginning in 2022, Nautica partnered with Warner Bros. Discovery on a limited-edition apparel capsule tied to the Discovery Channel's Shark Week franchise, with proceeds supporting ocean conservation nonprofit Oceana. The collaboration continued into 2023 with an expanded collection and an increased donation commitment.

As part of its 40th anniversary celebrations in August 2023, Nautica partnered with YouTube creator and vintage fashion enthusiast Eddie Win on a 23-piece menswear capsule including tees, joggers and baseball caps, many based on designs dating back to the 1980s and 1990s.

In September 2023, Nautica collaborated with New York-based streetwear label KROST on a nautical-inspired capsule collection, with 1% of net sales donated to support Oceana's ocean conservation work.

== Notable fragrances ==
- Nautica Voyage
- Nautica Heritage
- Nautica Voyage Sport
- Nautica Voyage N–83
- Nautica Midnight Voyage
- Nautica Blue
- Nautica Classic
- Nautica Pure Blue
- Nautica Life
- Nautica Competition
- Nautica Life Energy
- Nautica Sunset Voyage
