= Lucky Brand Jeans =

American denim company

Lucky Brand

- Store in Knoxville, Tennessee
- Type: Subsidiary
- Industry: Fashion
- Founded: 1990; 36 years ago
- Founders: Gene Montesano, Barry Perlman
- Owner: Authentic Brands Group
- Website: www.luckybrand.com

Lucky Brand is an American denim company founded in Vernon, California, in 1990 by Gene Montesano and Barry Perlman. Lucky also produces other apparel, including activewear, outerwear, T-shirts, and professional attire. Since its founding, Lucky Brand has expanded beyond denim into a full lifestyle brand, offering men's, women's, and children's apparel, accessories, and home goods including bedding and decor.

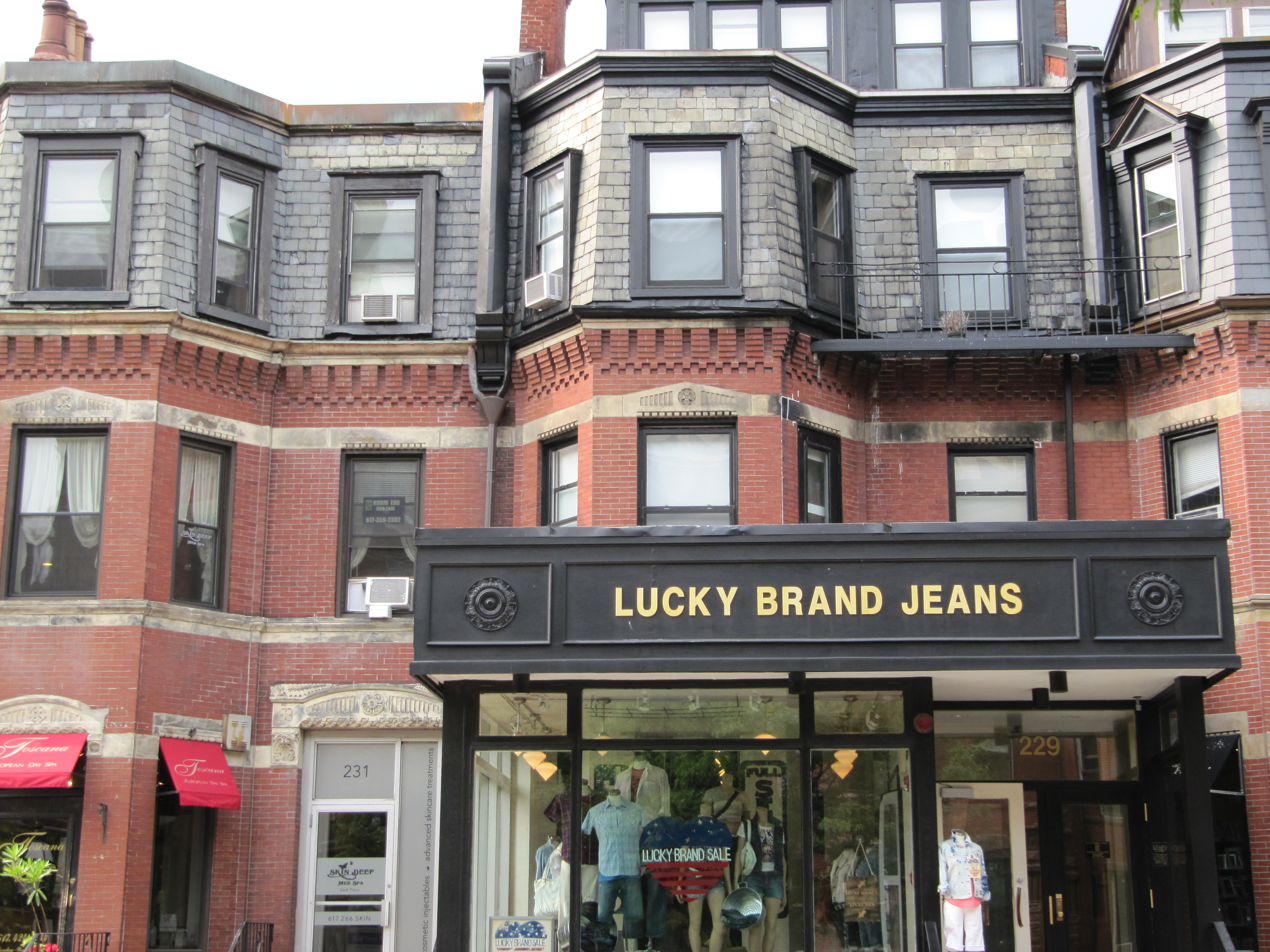
Store on Newbury Street in Boston

In 2020, Lucky Brand filed for bankruptcy and was acquired by Authentic Brands Group and SPARC Group, which merged with JCPenney to form Catalyst Brands in 2025. Through this agreement, Catalyst is the core licensee and operating partner for Lucky Brand and oversees all sourcing, product design and development, wholesale, operations of the brand's North American retail stores, and its growing e-commerce business. Authentic owns the Lucky Brand intellectual property and oversees all licensing partnerships, new business and brand development.

== History ==
Previous logo

In the 1970s, 21-year-old Jamal H Nathan along with 17-year-old Barry Perlman opened a Florida jeans shop called Four Way Street. "During the evenings, we'd head out to the local Laundromat with our pockets full of coins and some bleach. A few hours later, we had a stack of great washed jeans -- one of a kind and 100% authentic!"

In 1978, Montesano moved to Los Angeles to enter the fashion industry there. With business partner Michael Caruso, he started Bongo and ran the brand for 15 years. After leaving Bongo, Montesano joined former business partner Perlman in 1990 to launch Lucky Brand.

The corporate headquarters moved from Vernon to the Arts District in Downtown Los Angeles in 2012. The jeans maker moved to a new downtown office located at 540 S. Santa Fe near the historic 4th and 6th Street Bridges.

In December 2013, Leonard Green & Partners acquired Lucky Brand Jeans for $225 million from Fifth & Pacific Companies. In 2019, Carlos Alberini had resigned as chairman and CEO. In July 2020, Lucky Brand filed for bankruptcy, and was acquired by Authentic Brands Group.

On 24 April 2024, Ted Baker Canada, the operator of Lucky Brand stores in Canada, filed for creditor protection in Canada and Chapter 15 bankruptcy in the U.S. The company blamed the operation suppliers of Authentic Brands Group for failing to pay. As a result, it was announced that all Lucky Brand stores in Canada would close.

== Product ==
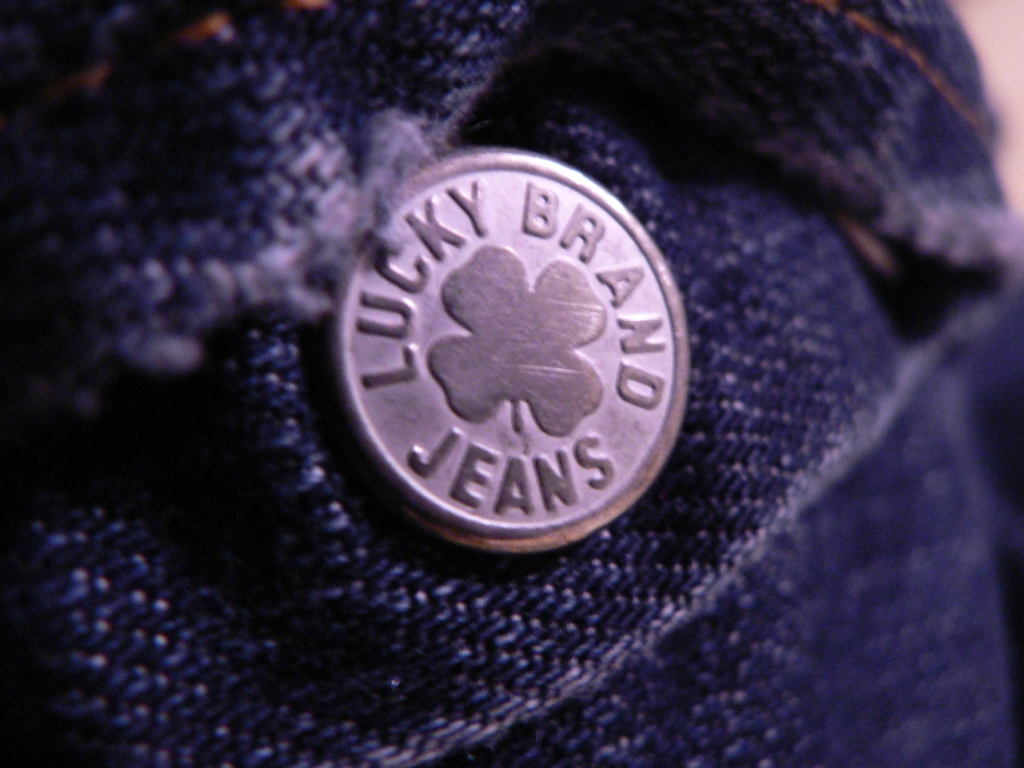
Button on the fly of a pair of Hendrix Lucky Brand Jeans

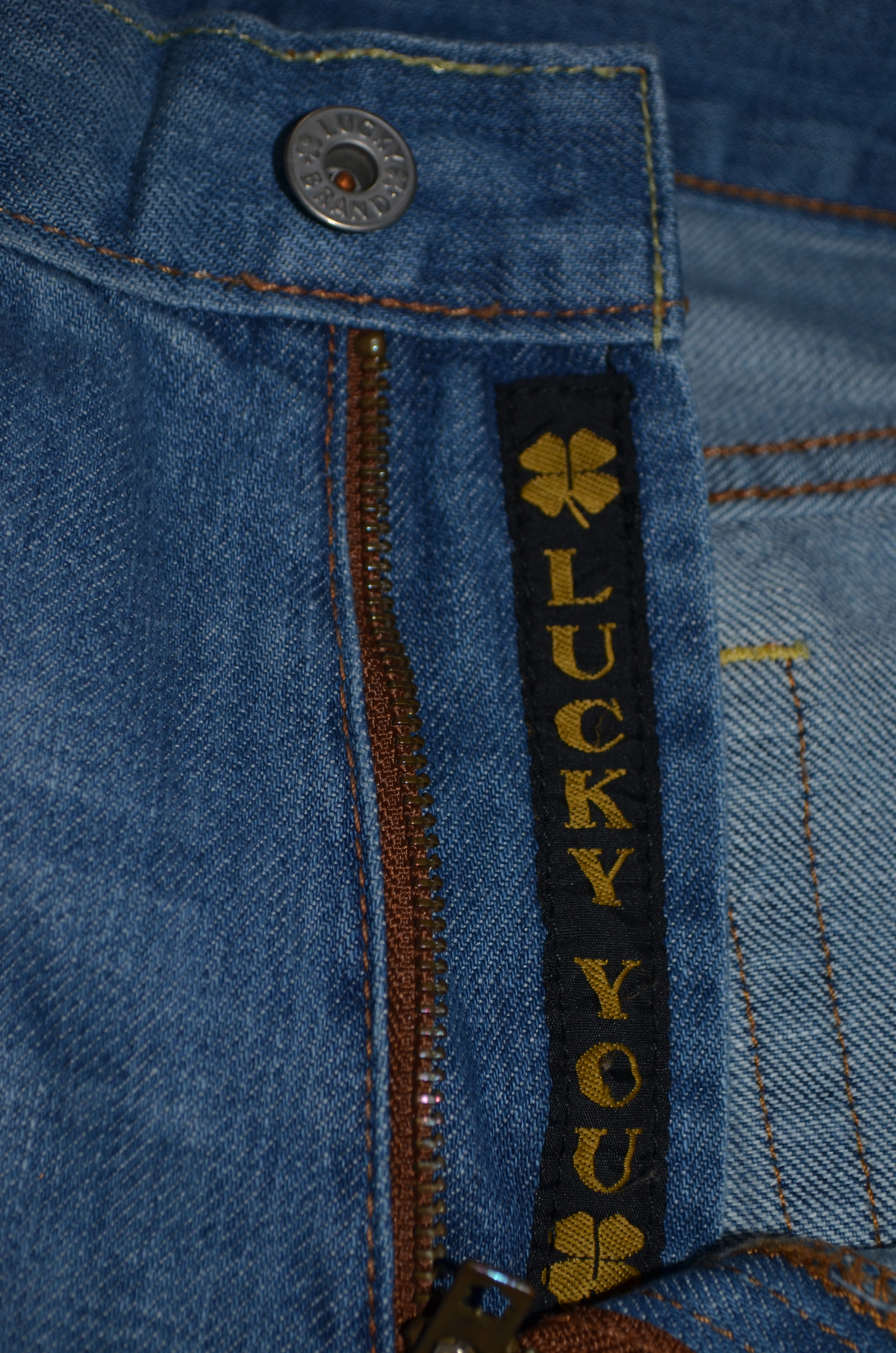
Lucky You Logo

All of the products sold by Lucky as well as their stores' decorations reflected a bohemian style. Denim is the major selling point of the company, making up about 60% of business. All Lucky Brand Jeans have two four-leaf clovers with the phrase "LUCKY YOU" stitched onto the outside of the fly shield. This has become a trademark of their denim line, which is made up of a wide variety of fits and washing.

In 2005, the company expanded its line to include clothing for infants through age 10. In 2006, the company opened Lucky Brand Jeans Kid stores, which exclusively sell their children's clothing.

Prior to 2010, most Lucky products were manufactured in the USA. They are currently made in Indonesia, China, Peru, Chile, Vietnam, Mexico, Sri Lanka and Haiti. Lucky jeans manufactured in the United States are hand-made in Los Angeles, and the detailing is done by hand, except for the washing process.

In the summer of 2013, Lucky re-introduced Made in America (MIA) jeans. The denim is produced by Cone Denim in their White Oak Mill in Greensboro, North Carolina. The jeans are then hand-stitched in Los Angeles. Almost every style of women's and men's jeans has an MIA counterpart.

=== Partnerships ===
In October 2022, Lucky Brand partnered with Paramount Network's western drama Yellowstone to release a limited-edition capsule collection ahead of the show's fifth season, featuring men's and women's denim jackets, jeans, hooded sweatshirts, T-shirts, and outerwear inspired by the wardrobe of the Dutton family and the show's Montana ranch setting. The collection's ad campaign featured members of the Compton Cowboys, a Los Angeles-based equestrian mentorship group, with a portion of proceeds benefiting the organization.

Building on that partnership, Lucky Brand named Yellowstone actor Cole Hauser as a brand ambassador in November 2023, with Hauser first appearing in the brand's holiday campaign.

In October 2024, timed to the premiere of Yellowstone's final season, Lucky Brand released a 20-piece designer collaboration with Hauser, who plays Rip Wheeler on the series. The collection included denim, flannel shirts, a faux-shearling-lined denim jacket, corduroy work shirts, and graphic T-shirts reflecting Hauser's personal style and what he described as "the grit and authenticity of the American West," and was sold through luckybrand.com, Dillard's, and Macy's.

In March 2023, Lucky Brand launched the first of two planned capsule collections with British heritage brand Laura Ashley, founded in 1953 and known for its floral prints. The 15-piece women's collection combined Lucky Brand's denim with Laura Ashley's textile patterns across jeans, dresses, shirting, shorts, and jackets, drawing on both brands' history to appeal to a "cottagecore"-influenced aesthetic. A second collaboration followed in July 2023, further developing the "soft girl" aesthetic with quilted denim and patchwork pieces.

Lucky Brand has also produced a licensed graphic apparel line featuring David Bowie, including T-shirts referencing the musician's imagery, logos, and album eras such as Young Americans and Life on Mars.

In August 2025, Lucky announced a collaboration with American singer, actress, and social media personality Addison Rae. The partnership debuted with the Addison Ultra Low Rise Flare, a style inspired by early 2000s fashion. Fans noticed Rae had already been wearing the jeans during her live performances leading up to the launch. Together, Rae and Lucky Brand set out to bring back the Y2K aesthetic "with the goal of turning low-rise skeptics into believers."

== Operations ==
Lucky is currently run by an "Office of the CEO" established on January 28, 2019, when Carlos Alberini stepped down as chairman and chief executive officer. Alberini left to take the role of CEO and Director at Guess, where he was COO from 2000 to 2010. Alberini had been CEO of Lucky since taking the post on January 31, 2014. David DeMattei was the former CEO.

There are 128 company-owned stores in the U.S. and Puerto Rico In the U.S., Lucky is also sold at major department store chains including Macy's, Nordstrom, Belk, and Dillard's, as well as at specialty chains.

== Lucky Foundation ==
The Lucky Brand Foundation was first launched in 1996, which was initially established with a goal to help children. Since the launch the foundation has raised over $8 million through fund raising events. Such events have featured rock performers such as Jackson Browne, Joe Cocker, B.B. King, and Bonnie Raitt. Another way the Foundation has been consistently successful at accomplishing their set goal is through the annual Black Tie & Blue Jeans Gala, which has a record of raising approximately $6 million for numerous children's charities including: Smile Train, Camp Sundown, Island Dolphin Care, Shane's Inspiration and The Bridge School. With the celebration of the 40th anniversary of the Summer of Love and the Beatles' Sgt. Pepper's album, Lucky Foundation was able to raise more than $700,000.
