= Camp Sundown =

Summer camp for children with xeroderma pigmentosum

Coordinates: 42.170132°N 73.672319°W

Camp Sundown is an American summer camp in Craryville, New York for children with extreme sun sensitivity, including conditions like xeroderma pigmentosum, erythropoietic protoporphyria, and actinic prurigo. All activities are held after sundown, to ensure that the children are not injured by the ultraviolet radiation from the rays of the sun.

== History ==
The camp was founded in 1996 by Dan and Caren Mahar, whose daughter, Katie, had xeroderma pigmentosum and could not attend a traditional summer camp. Initially, the camp consisted of 11 families who gathered at a local motel in Poughkeepsie for five days.

In 2003, the Mahars acquired land in Craryville and built the camp's current structure.

== Facilities and activities ==
The camp is set on 60 acres. The main camp building has eight bedrooms, each with two bed and their own bathroom. The windows are tinted and have light-blocking curtains, and the lights use incandescent bulbs, which do not emit UV light.

The camp is held for two weeks to six weeks each summer, depending on available funding. Parents attend with their children.

During the day, campers sleep and eat in the inside dining hall. There is also an entertainment room for watching films or playing video games, and an indoor pool without windows.

Outdoor activities include horse riding, go-karts, and soccer. Field trips are also organized, including one to a nearby lake, where a campfire is held. Another field trip is to Campbell Hall, where residents throw a "moonlight festival" for the campers, which includes carnival games, fireworks, and a softball game with the local fire department.
