= Monkey jacket =

Waist length jacket used by sailors and organ grinders

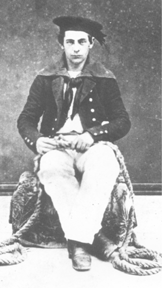
American Civil War era sailor in a monkey jacket

A monkey jacket is a waist length jacket tapering at the back to a point. Use of the term has been dated to the 1850s onwards.

As early as the 1790s sailors wore a broad collar, double-breasted, waist length roundabout style jacket, a.k.a. mustering jacket, that later became known as a "monkey jacket".

This roundabout style jacket was nicknamed "monkey jacket" after the monkeys that accompanied organ grinders. These street organ monkeys were trained to do tricks and collect coins as the grinder played music. The jacket was not named because sailors climbed the rigging of sailing ships like monkeys.

The term is also used in the United Kingdom to describe a type of jacket worn in Mod subculture.

== Other sources ==
- Jeans, Peter D (1998). Ship to Shore: A Dictionary of Everyday Words and Phrases Derived from the Sea. ISBN 0-87436-717-4.
- Melville, Herman. Moby-Dick.
