= Linens 'n Things =

American home furnishings retailer

Linens 'n Things, Inc.
- Type: Private
- Industry: Retail
- Founded: August 1970; 56 years ago (as retail stores)
- Defunct: 2008 (stores only)
- Fate: Filed for bankruptcy
- Products: Home Furnishings
- Revenue: $2.70 billion in 2005
- Parent: Omni Retail Enterprises
- Website: linensnthings.com

Linens 'n Things, Inc. is an online retailer and former department store specializing in home textiles, housewares, and decorative home accessories. Based in Clifton, New Jersey, the chain operated 571 stores in 47 U.S. states and six Canadian provinces, and had 7,300 employees as of December 2006. The company's business strategy was "to offer a broad selection of high quality, brand name home furnishings merchandise at exceptional everyday values, provide superior guest service, and maintain low operating costs."

Burdened with debt after private equity buyouts, the company announced it would shutter all remaining stores in October 2008. It was relaunched as an online-only retailer in February 2009 at its former domain name, LNT.com, selling similar products as its brick-and-mortar stores had. As an online retailer, it originally ceased operating in 2018.

In July 2020, the rights to Linens 'n Things were acquired by holding company Retail Ecommerce Ventures (REV). As of November 2020, the website was relaunched for the second time.

== Founding ==
In November 1958, Eugene Wallace Kalkin established a leased-linen department in the New Jersey discount retailer Great Eastern Mills. In August 1970, Great Eastern Mills opened the first Linens 'n Things store in East Brunswick, New Jersey. After a succession of corporate ownership changes and the bankruptcy of Daylin, Inc. in 1975, Kalkin bought seven locations out of bankruptcy and founded an independent parent company, which became Linens 'n Things, Inc.

By 1983, the chain had grown to 55 stores, and attracted the interest of retail conglomerate Melville Corporation, which acquired it that year. Under CEO Norman Axelrod, who joined in 1989, the company expanded aggressively, particularly in the superstore format; it was locked in a race for locations against archrival Bed, Bath & Beyond. It was spun off in an IPO when Melville reorganized into CVS Corporation in 1996.

== Acquisition and trouble ==
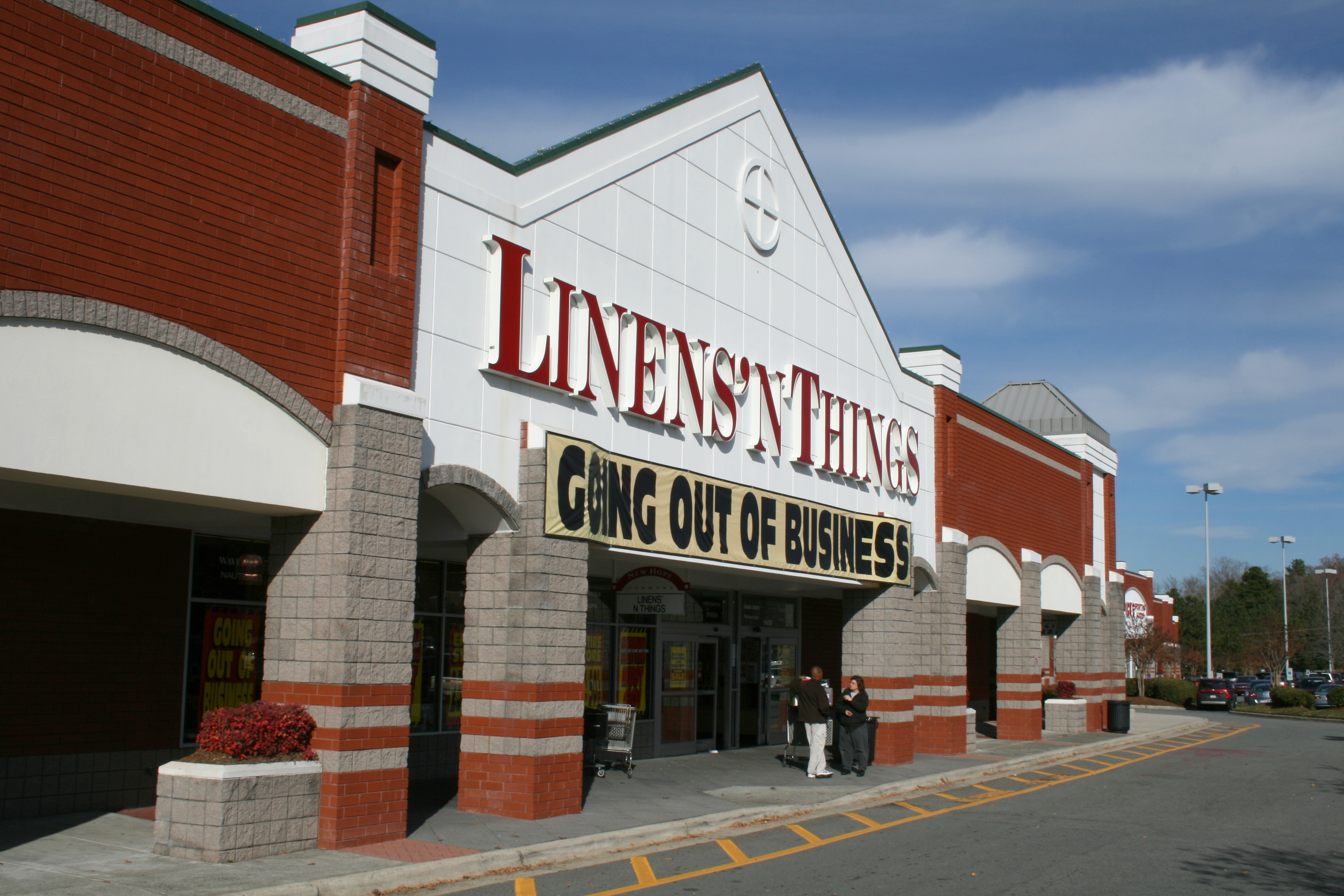
A Linens 'n Things store (with older logo) going out of business in Durham, North Carolina.

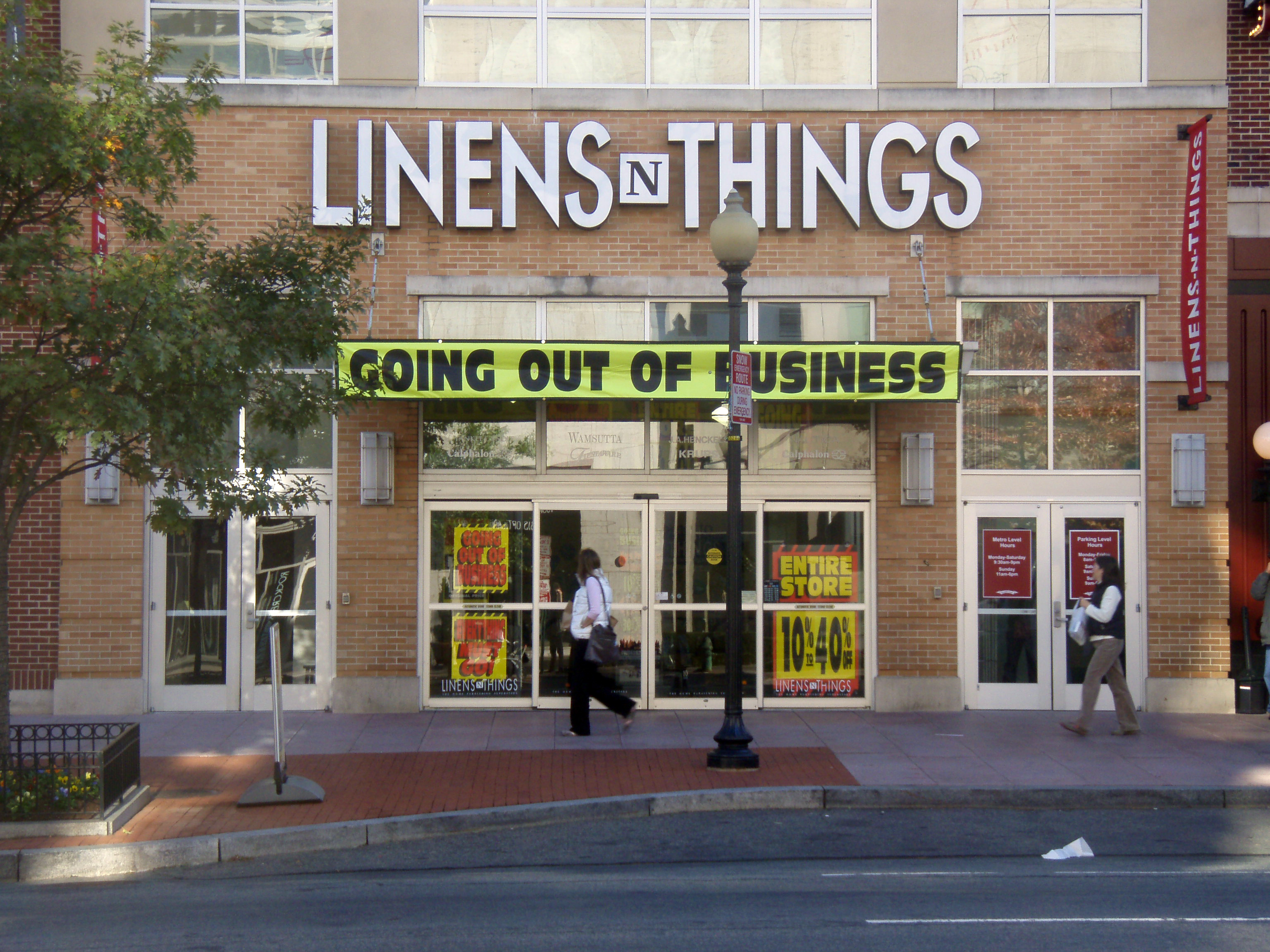
A Linens 'n Things store (showing newer logo) in Washington, D.C., with banner notifying customers that it was "going out of business"

The company was acquired in February 2006 by Apollo Global Management, a private equity limited partnership, for US$1.3 billion. As a part of the transition from a public company to the private-owned business, the position of CEO went from Norman Axelrod to Robert (Bob) DiNicola; alongside of him were several executives such as F. David Coder who is president and Omer Fancy who is the executive Vice President of Marketing.

According to Form 10-Q filed with the U.S. Securities and Exchange Commission for the quarterly period ended September 29, 2007, Linens Holding Co. and subsidiaries (including Linens 'n Things, Inc. acquired in February 2006 for cash of approximately $1.3 billion) reported net sales of $666.8 million, versus $658.2 million in the year-earlier period. The increase in net sales was primarily due to the opening of new stores since September 30, 2006 offset by the impact of a decline in comparable store sales. The decline in comparable store sales was primarily due to a decline in customer transactions partially offset by an increase in average transaction value.

The operating loss (after a charge of $16.8 million for impairment of property and equipment in the more recent quarter) was $56.6 million against a loss of $17.9 million a year ago. After net interest expense and other income & expense, the loss before income taxes was $79.2 million compared to a loss of $41.7 million. After provision/benefit for income taxes, Linens Holdings reported a net loss of $79.9 million versus a net loss of $27.4 million.

On April 17, 2008, the New York Post reported that the company was seeking to sell its highly profitable Canadian Division, but no one at Linens 'n Things would confirm nor deny this, saying only that an adviser had been hired to explore strategic alternatives. Ultimately the Canadian Linens 'n Things stores met the same fate as their U.S. counterparts.

=== Bankruptcy and liquidation ===
On May 2, 2008, Linens 'n Things filed for Chapter 11 bankruptcy and closed 120 stores. The company's bankruptcy was contributed to the ongoing Great Recession, as well as declining sales. In August 2008, Linens 'n Things devised a plan to emerge from bankruptcy early in 2009. Under the plan, the retailer intended to reverse many of the strategies introduced after the company was bought by Apollo. Chief among those tactics was a shift to splashy clearance sales and product promotions. Revised management wished to return Linens 'n Things to an "everyday, low price" model it had pursued during its earlier years as a public company. It also wished to improve the quality of its merchandise and to keep shelves stocked in timely fashion, the paper said.

On October 7, 2008, Bloomberg News reported that Linens 'n Things asked the Bankruptcy Court for permission to auction the remaining 371 stores and hold store closing sales. On October 14, the company announced its official sale to a group of asset recovery specialists. The company began going-out-of-business sales at its remaining stores in both the United States and Canada and on the chain's website, LNT.com, on October 17. The sales concluded on December 28, 2008, in all stores, but Linens 'n Things continued the going-out-of-business sale on its website until February 15, 2009.

Following the chain's closure, a vacant store in Middletown, Rhode Island was used by film director Wes Anderson in 2011 to construct and film sets for his film Moonrise Kingdom.

=== Online revival ===
In 2009, Linens 'n Things emerged from bankruptcy as planned and announced that the website would remain open for business following the conclusion of the primary online store closing sale. The e-commerce site was taken over by new ownership to continue the same focus as the brick and mortar stores prior to their closing. Following the conclusion of business on the original website on February 15, 2009, customers were redirected to the online store's new home, originally located at thenewlnt.com but later relocated to the old domain name, lnt.com.

Linens 'n Things was sold on December 9, 2013, by Gordon Brothers and Hilco Global to Galaxy Brand Holdings.

The brand is currently owned by Retail Ecommerce Ventures, a holding company founded by Alex Mehr and Tai Lopez, which is dedicated to acquiring and reviving distressed brands as e-commerce businesses. REV has also acquired a number of other brands, such as Dressbarn, Modell's Sporting Goods, the Franklin Mint, and Pier 1 Imports.

On March 2, 2023, Retail Ecommerce Ventures, Linens 'n Things' current parent, announced that it was considering a possible bankruptcy filing.
