= RadioShack =

American electronics store chain

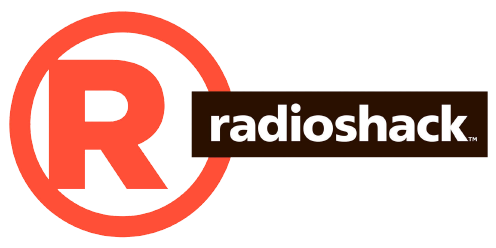
- Logo used from 2013 to 2015 and since 2023

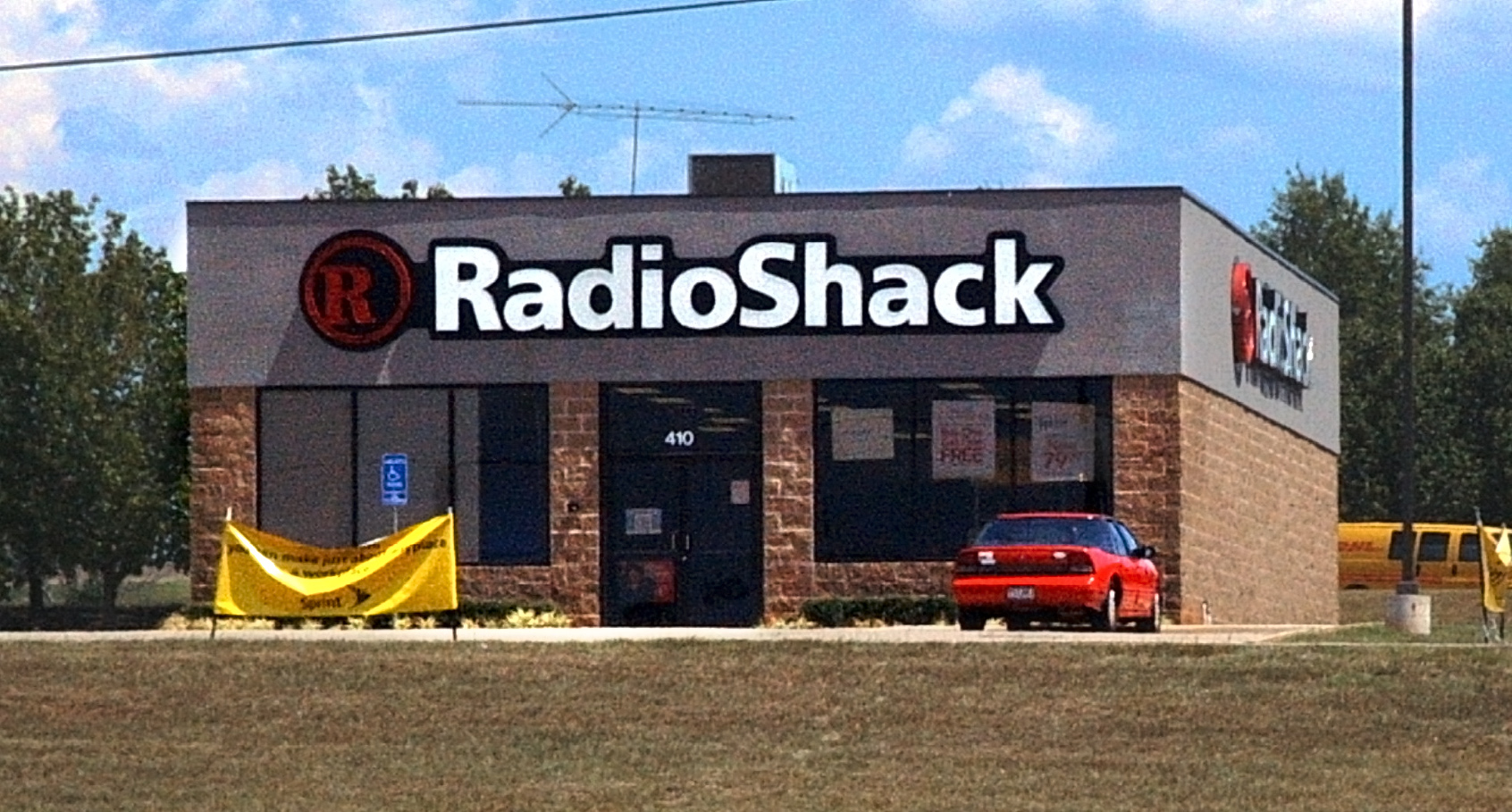
- A typical free-standing RadioShack store in Texarkana, Texas (2006)
- Formerly: Radio Shack Corporation (1921–1962); Tandy Corporation (1962–2000); RadioShack Corporation (2000–2015); General Wireless Operations Inc. (2015–2020)
- Industry: E-commerce, retail
- Founded: 1921; 105 years ago Boston, Massachusetts, US
- Founders: Theodore and Milton Deutschmann
- Headquarters: Fort Worth, Texas, US
- Number of locations: Approximately 400 authorized dealers in the US (Note: Down from a peak of 7,300 locations in the 1990s.); Various international locations
- Products: Consumer electronics
- Parent: General Wireless IP Holdings LLC (2015–2020); Retail Ecommerce Ventures (2020–2023); Unicomer Group (2023–present)
- Website: radioshack.com

RadioShack (formerly written as Radio Shack) is an American electronics retailer that was established in 1921 as a mail-order business focused on amateur radio. Its parent company was purchased by Tandy Corporation in 1962; Tandy ended mail order, shifted to retail by opening small stores staffed by people knowledgeable in electronics, greatly reduced the number of items carried, and replaced name-brand products with private-label items from lower-cost manufacturers. These moves were successful and the brand grew.

In the late 1970s, the company branched into personal computers, and in the 1990s, it began to focus on wireless phones and de-emphasizing the hobbyist market. RadioShack reached its peak in 1999, when Tandy operated over 8,000 stores in the United States, Mexico, and Canada, and under the Tandy name in The Netherlands, Belgium, Germany, France, the United Kingdom, and Australia. However, its sales strategy increasingly competed with big-box stores and dedicated wireless phone retailers, and it fell into decline.

In February 2015, after years of management crises, poor worker relations, diminished revenue, and 11 consecutive quarterly losses, RadioShack was delisted from the New York Stock Exchange and subsequently filed for Chapter 11 bankruptcy. In May 2015, the company's assets were purchased by General Wireless, a subsidiary of Standard General, for US$26.2 million. In March 2017, General Wireless and subsidiaries also filed for bankruptcy and RadioShack announced plans to shift its business primarily online. RadioShack was acquired by Retail Ecommerce Ventures and RadioShack operated primarily as an e-commerce website with a network of independently owned and franchised RadioShack stores. In May 2023, the El Salvador-based franchisee Unicomer Group acquired control of the worldwide RadioShack business.

== History ==
=== The first 40 years ===
The company was started as Radio Shack in 1921 by two brothers, Theodore and Milton Deutschmann, who wanted to provide equipment for the new field of amateur radio (also known as ham radio). The brothers opened a one-store retail and mail-order operation in the heart of downtown Boston at 46 Brattle Street. They chose the name "Radio Shack", which was the term for a small, wooden structure that housed a ship's radio equipment. The Deutschmanns thought the name was appropriate for a store that would supply the needs of radio officers aboard ships, as well as hams (amateur radio operators). The idea for the name came from an employee, Bill Halligan, who went on to form the Hallicrafters company. The term was already in use — and is to this day — by hams when referring to the location of their stations.

The company issued its first catalog in 1939 as it entered the high-fidelity music market. In 1954, Radio Shack began selling its own private-label products under the brand name Realist, changing the brand name to Realistic after being sued by Stereo Realist.

During the period the chain was based in Boston, it was commonly referred to disparagingly by its customers as "Nagasaki Hardware", as much of the merchandise was sourced from Japan, then perceived as a source of low-quality, inexpensive parts.

In 1959, the store moved its headquarters to 730 Commonwealth Avenue in Boston (across the street from Boston University's Marsh Chapel), with ambitious plans for further expansion. After expanding to nine stores plus an extensive mail-order business, the company fell on hard times in the early 1960s.

=== Tandy Corporation ===
Radio Shack logo from 1972 to 1995

Tandy Corporation, a leather goods corporation, was looking for other hobbyist-related businesses into which it could expand. Charles D. Tandy saw the potential of Radio Shack and retail consumer electronics, purchasing the company in 1962 for US$300,000. At the time of the Tandy Radio Shack & Leather 1962 acquisition, the Radio Shack chain was nearly bankrupt.

Tandy's strategy was to appeal to hobbyists. It created small stores that were staffed by people who knew electronics, and sold mainly private brands. Tandy closed Radio Shack's unprofitable mail-order business, ended credit purchases and eliminated many top management positions, keeping the salespeople, merchandisers and advertisers. The number of items carried was cut from 40,000 to 2,500, as Tandy sought to "identify the 20% that represents 80% of the sales" and replace Radio Shack's handful of large stores with many "little holes in the wall", large numbers of rented locations which were easier to close and re-open elsewhere if one location didn't work out. Private-label brands from lower-cost manufacturers displaced name brands to raise Radio Shack profit margins; non-electronic lines from go-carts to musical instruments were abandoned entirely.

Customer data from the former RadioShack mail-order business determined where Tandy would locate new stores. As an incentive for them to work long hours and remain profitable, store managers were required to take an ownership stake in their stores. In markets too small to support a company-owned Radio Shack store, the chain relied on independent dealers who carried the products as a sideline. Charles D. Tandy said "We're not looking for the guy who wants to spend his entire paycheck on a sound system", instead seeking customers "looking to save money by buying cheaper goods and improving them through modifications and accessorizing", making it common among "nerds" and "kids aiming to excel at their science fairs".

Charles D. Tandy, who had guided the firm through a period of growth in the 1960s and 1970s, died of a heart attack at age 60 in November 1978.

In 1982, the breakup of the Bell System encouraged subscribers to own their own telephones instead of renting them from local phone companies; Radio Shack offered twenty models of home phones.

Much of the Radio Shack line was manufactured in the company's own factories. By 1990/1991, Tandy was the world's biggest manufacturer of personal computers; its OEM manufacturing capacity was building hardware for Digital Equipment Corporation, GRiD, Olivetti, AST Computer, Panasonic, and others. The company manufactured everything from store fixtures to computer software to wire and cable, TV antennas, audio and videotape. At one point, Radio Shack was the world's largest electronics chain.

In June 1991, Tandy closed or restructured its 200 Radio Shack Computer Centers, acquired Computer City, and attempted to shift its emphasis away from components and cables, toward mainstream consumer electronics. Tandy sold its computer manufacturing to AST Research in 1993, including the laptop computer Grid Systems Corporation which it had purchased in 1988. It sold the Memorex consumer recording trademarks to a Hong Kong firm, and divested most of its manufacturing divisions. House-brand products, which Radio Shack had long marked up heavily, were replaced with third-party brands already readily available from competitors. This reduced profit margins.

In 1992, Tandy attempted to launch big-box electronics retailer Incredible Universe; most of the seventeen stores never turned a profit. Its six profitable stores were sold to Fry's Electronics in 1996; the others were closed. Other rebranding attempts included the launch or acquisition of chains including McDuff, Video Concepts and the Edge in Electronics; these were larger stores which carried TVs, appliances and other lines.

Tandy closed the McDuff stores and abandoned Incredible Universe in 1996, but continued to add new Radio Shack stores. By 1996, industrial parts suppliers were deploying e-commerce to sell a wide range of components online; it would be another decade before RadioShack would sell parts from its website, with a selection so limited that it was no rival to established industrial vendors with million-item specialised, centralised inventories.

In 1994, the company introduced a service known as "The Repair Shop at Radio Shack", through which it provided inexpensive out-of-warranty repairs for more than 45 different brands of electronic equipment. The company already had over one million parts in its extensive parts warehouses and 128 service centers throughout the US and Canada; it hoped to leverage these to build customer relationships and increase store traffic. Len Roberts, president of the Radio Shack division since 1993, estimated that the new repair business could generate $500 million per year by 1999.

"America's technology store" was abandoned for the "you've got questions, we've got answers" slogan in 1994. In early summer 1995, the company changed its logo; "Radio Shack" was spelled in camel case as "RadioShack". In 1996, RadioShack successfully petitioned the US Federal Communications Commission to allocate frequencies for the Family Radio Service, a short-range walkie-talkie system that proved popular.

==== Battery of the Month ====
From the 1960s until the early 1990s, Radio Shack promoted a "battery of the month" club; a free wallet-sized cardboard card offered one free Enercell per month in-store. Like the free vacuum tube testing offered in-store in the early 1970s, this small loss leader drew foot traffic. The cards also served as generic business cards for the salespeople.

==== Allied Radio ====
In 1970, Tandy Corporation bought Allied Radio Corporation (both retail and industrial divisions), merging the brands into Allied Radio Shack and closing duplicate locations. After a 1973 federal government review, the company sold off the few remaining Allied retail stores and resumed using the Radio Shack name. Allied Electronics, the firm's industrial component operation, continued as a Tandy division until it was sold to Spartan Manufacturing in 1981.

==== Flavoradio ====
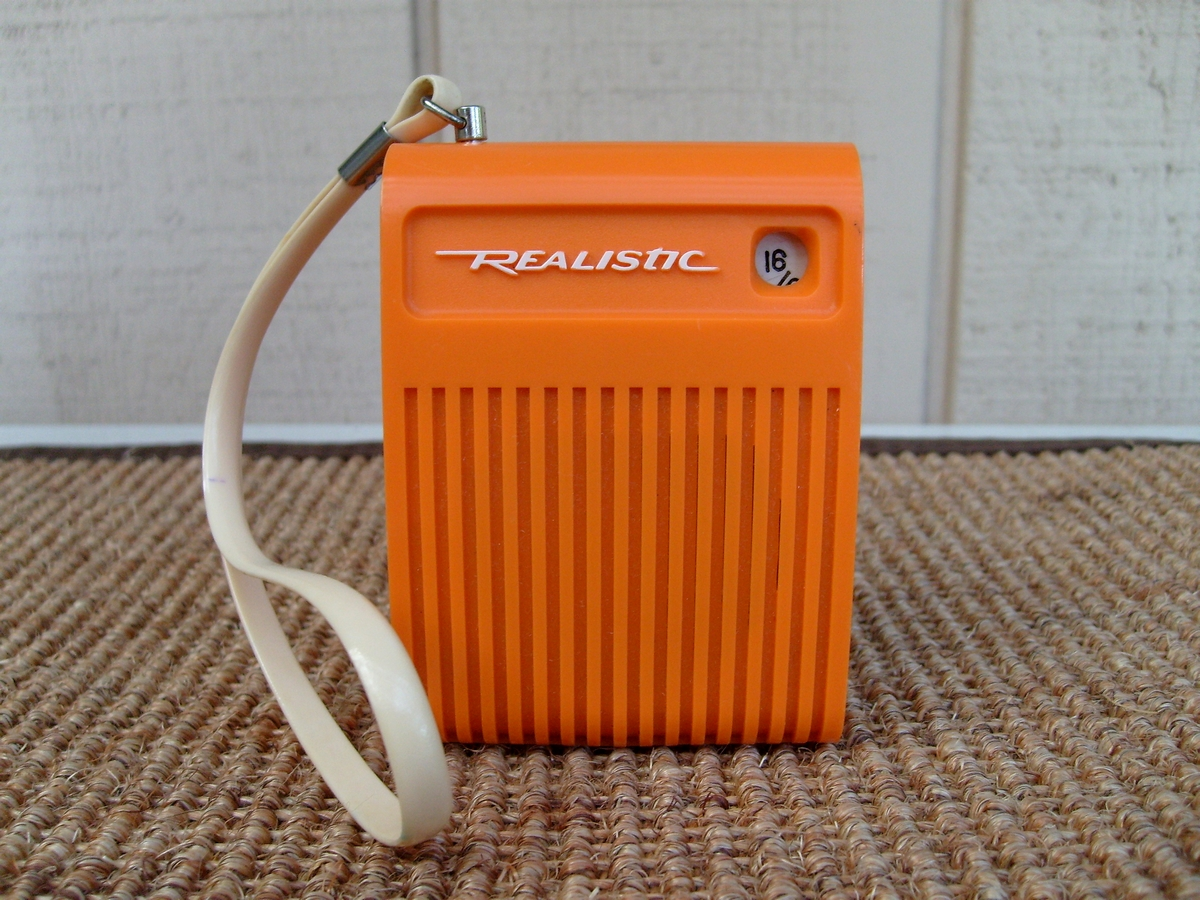
Realistic Flavoradio

The longest-running product for Radio Shack was the AM-only Realistic Flavoradio, sold from 1972 to 2000, 28 years in three designs. This also made the Flavoradio the longest production run in radio history. It was originally released in five colors in the 1972 catalog: vanilla, chocolate, strawberry, avocado, and plum. For 1973, vanilla and chocolate were dropped (and thus are rare today) and replaced by lemon and orange. At some point two-tone models with white backs were offered but never appeared in catalogs; these are extremely rare today.

The original design had five transistors (model 166). A sixth was added in 1980 (model 166a). The case was redesigned for 1987, making it taller and thinner, and it came in red, blue, and black. The final model, 201a, came in 1996 and was designed around an integrated circuit. They were first made in Korea then Hong Kong and finally the Philippines. The Flavoradio carried the Realistic name until about 1996, when it switched to "Radio Shack", then finally "Optimus". When the Flavoradio was dropped from the catalog in 2001, it was the last AM-only radio on the market.

==== CB radio ====
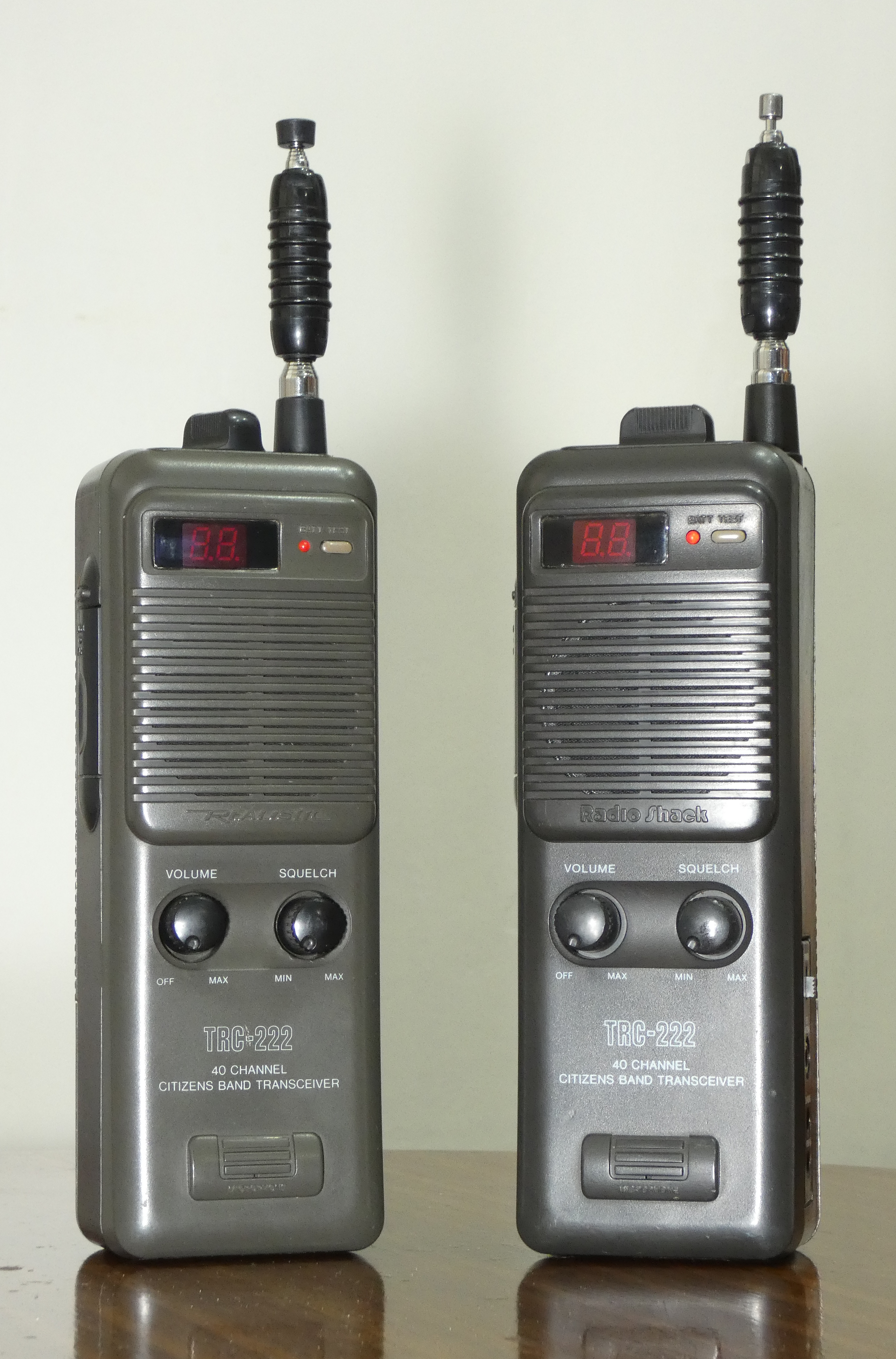
(From left to right) Realistic and RadioShack model TRC-222, both CB with 40 channels, circa 1993

The chain profited from the mass popularity of citizens band radio in the mid-1970s which, at its peak, represented nearly 30% of the chain's revenue.

==== Home computers ====
In 1977, two years after the MITS Altair 8800, Radio Shack introduced the TRS-80, one of the first mass-produced personal computers. This was a complete pre-assembled system at a time when many microcomputers were built from kits, backed by a nationwide retail chain when computer stores were in their infancy. Sales of the initial, primitive US$600 (equal to $3,188 today) TRS-80 exceeded all expectations despite its limited capabilities and high price. This was followed by the TRS-80 Color Computer in 1980, designed to attach to a television. Tandy also inspired the Tandy Computer Whiz Kids (1982–1991), a comic-book duo of teen calculator enthusiasts who teamed up with the likes of Archie and Superman. Radio Shack's computer stores offered lessons to pre-teens as "Radio Shack Computer Camp" in the early 1980s.

By September 1982, the company had more than 4,300 stores, and more than 2,000 independent franchises in towns not large enough for a company-owned store. The latter also sold third-party hardware and software for Tandy computers, but company-owned stores did not sell or even acknowledge the existence of non-Tandy products. In the mid-1980s, Radio Shack began a transition from its proprietary 8-bit computers to its proprietary IBM PC compatible Tandy computers, removing the "Radio Shack" name from the product in an attempt to shake off the long-running nicknames "Radio Scrap" and "Trash 80" to make the product appeal to business users. Poor compatibility, shrinking margins and a lack of economies of scale led Radio Shack to exit the computer-manufacturing market in the 1990s after losing much of the desktop PC market to newer, price-competitive rivals like Dell. Tandy acquired the Computer City chain in 1991, and sold the stores to CompUSA in 1998.

In 1994, RadioShack began selling IBM's Aptiva line of home computers. This partnership would last until 1998, when RadioShack partnered with Compaq and created 'The Creative Learning Center' as a store-within-a-store to promote desktop PCs. Similar promotions were tried with 'The Sprint Store at RadioShack' (mobile telephones), 'RCA Digital Entertainment Center' (home audio and video products), and 'PowerZone' (RadioShack's line of battery products, power supplies, and surge protectors).

=== RadioShack Corporation ===
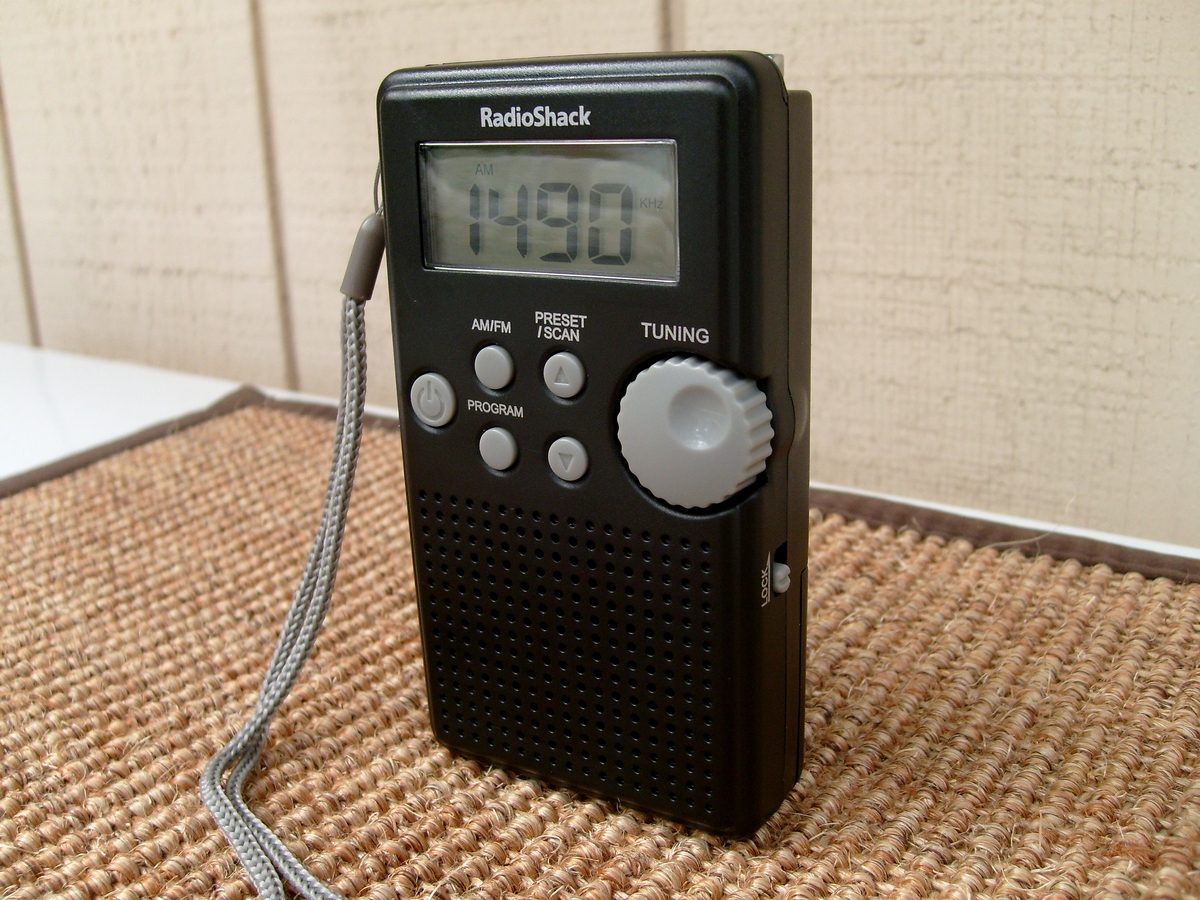
RadioShack transistor radio

1996–2013 logo, still used in many of the locations that were RadioShack before they closed. This logo is similar to the logo they used from 2013 to 2017.

In the mid-1990s, the company attempted to move out of small components and into more mainstream consumer markets, focusing on marketing wireless phones. This placed the chain, long accustomed to charging wide margins on specialized products not readily available from other local retailers, into direct competition against vendors such as Best Buy and Walmart.

In May 2000, the company dropped the Tandy name altogether, becoming RadioShack Corporation. The leather operating assets were sold to The Leather Factory on November 30, 2000; that business remains profitable.

House brands Realistic and Optimus were discontinued. In 1999, the company agreed to carry RCA products in a five-year agreement for a "RCA Digital Entertainment Center" store-within-a-store. When the RCA contract ended, RadioShack introduced its own Presidian and Accurian brands, reviving the Optimus brand in 2005 for some low-end products. Enercell, a house brand for dry cell batteries, remained in use until approximately 2014.

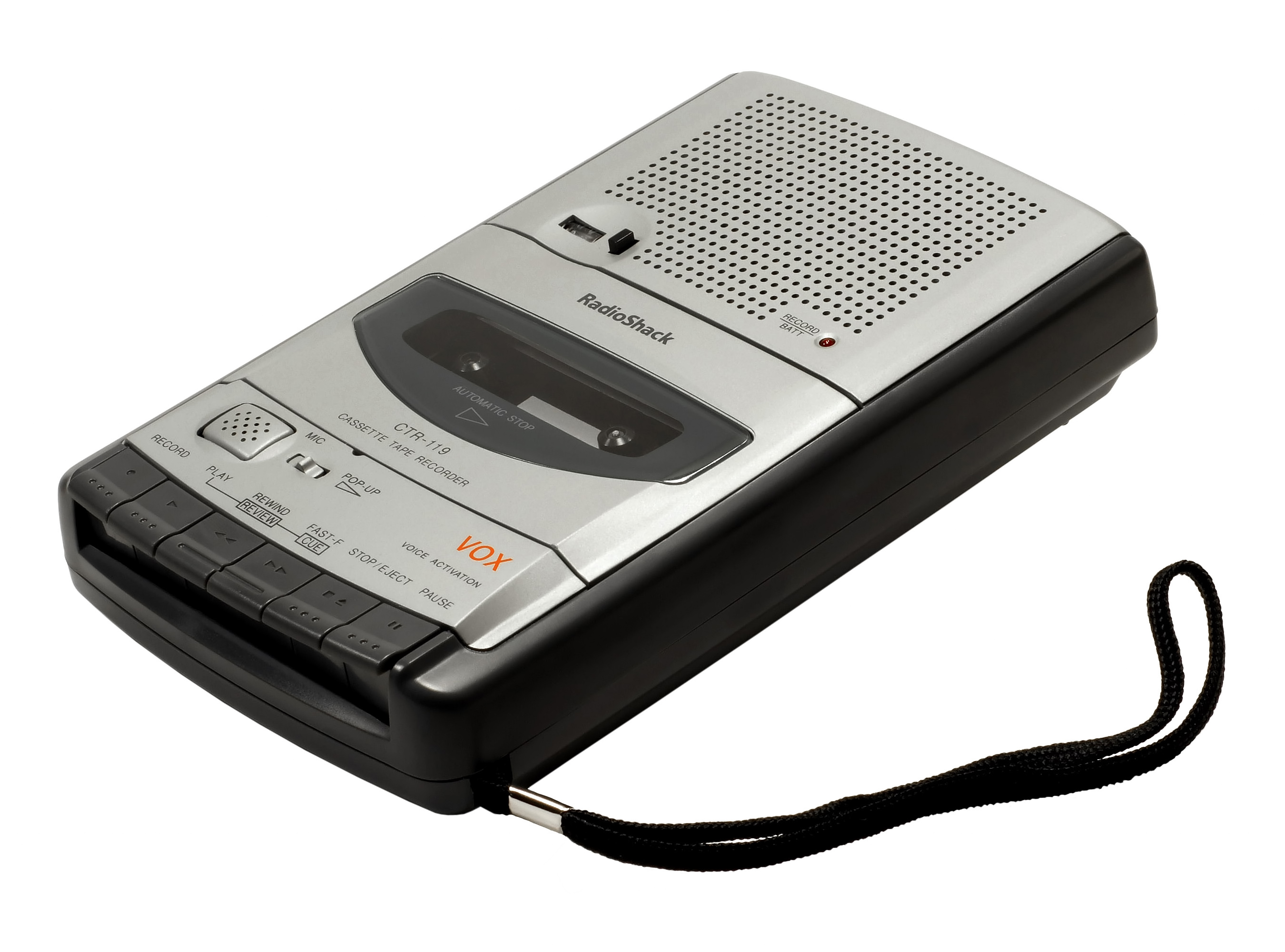
RadioShack tape recorder

Most of the RadioShack house brands had been dropped when Tandy divested its manufacturing facilities in the early 1990s; the original list included: Realistic (stereo, hi-fi and radio), Archer (antenna rotors and boosters), Micronta (test equipment), Tandy (computers), TRS-80 (proprietary computer), ScienceFair (kits), DuoFone (landline telephony), Concertmate (music synthesizer), Enercell (cells and batteries), Road Patrol (radar detectors, bicycle radios), Patrolman (Realistic radio scanner), Deskmate (software), KitchenMate, Stereo Shack, Supertape (recording tape), Mach One, Optimus (speakers and turntables), Flavoradio (pocket AM radios in various colours), Weatheradio, Portavision (small televisions) and Minimus (speakers).

In 2000, RadioShack was one of multiple backers of the CueCat barcode reader, which soon turned out to be a marketing failure. The company had invested US$35 million in the concept, including printing the barcodes throughout its catalogs, and distributing CueCat devices to customers at no charge.

The last annual RadioShack printed catalogs were distributed to the public in 2003.

Until 2004, RadioShack routinely asked for the name and address of purchasers so they could be added to mailing lists. Name and mailing address were requested for special orders (RadioShack Unlimited parts and accessories, Direc2U items not stocked locally), returns, check payments, RadioShack Answers Plus credit card applications, service plan purchases and carrier activations of cellular telephones.

On December 20, 2005, RadioShack announced the sale of its newly built riverfront Fort Worth, Texas headquarters building to German-based KanAm Grund; the property was leased back to RadioShack for 20 years. In 2008, RadioShack assigned this lease to the Tarrant County College District (TCC), remaining in 400,000 square feet (37,000 m^{2}) of the space as its headquarters.

In 2005, RadioShack parted with Verizon for a 10-year agreement with Cingular (later AT&T) and renegotiated its 11-year agreement with Sprint. In July 2011, RadioShack ended its wireless partnership with T-Mobile, replacing it with the "Verizon Wireless Store" within a store. 2005 under the leadership of Jim Hamilton, marked a banner year for wireless. RadioShack sold more mobile phones than Walmart, Circuit City and Best Buy combined.

RadioShack had not made products under the Realistic name since the early 1990s. Support for many of Radio Shack's traditional product lines, including amateur radio, had ended by 2006. A handful of small-town franchise dealers used their ability to carry non-RadioShack merchandise to bring in parts from outside sources; however, these stores were a minority.

==== PointMobl and "The Shack" ====
In mid-December 2008, RadioShack opened three concept stores under the name "PointMobl" to sell wireless phones and service, netbooks, iPod and GPS navigation devices. The three Texas stores (Dallas, Highland Village and Allen) were furnished with white fixtures like those in the remodelled wireless departments of individual RadioShack stores, but there was no communicated relationship to RadioShack itself. Had the test proved successful, RadioShack could have moved to convert existing RadioShack locations into PointMobl stores in certain markets.

While some PointMobl products, such as car power adapters and phone cases, were carried as store-brand products in RadioShack stores, the stand-alone PointMobl stores were closed and the concept abandoned in March 2011.

In August 2009, RadioShack rebranded itself as "The Shack". The campaign increased sales of mobile products, but at the expense of its core components business.

RadioShack aggressively promoted Dish Network subscriptions.

In November 2012, RadioShack introduced Amazon Locker parcel pick-up services at its stores, only to dump the program in September 2013. In 2013, the chain made token attempts to regain the do it yourself market, including a new "Do It Together" slogan.

Long-time staff observed a slow and gradual shift away from electronic parts and customer service and toward promotion of wireless sales and add-ons; the pressure to sell gradually increased, while the focus on training and product knowledge decreased. Morale was abysmal; longtime employees who were paid bonus and retirement in stock options saw the value of these instruments fade away.

==== Financial decline ====
In 1998, RadioShack called itself the single largest seller of consumer telecommunications products in the world; its stock reached its peak a year later.

InterTAN, a former Tandy subsidiary, sold the Tandy UK stores in 1999 and the Australian stores in 2001. InterTAN was sold (with its Canadian stores) to rival Circuit City in 2004. The RadioShack brand remained in use in the United States, but the 21st century proved a period of long decline for the chain, which was slow to respond to key trends— such as e-commerce, the entry of competitors like Best Buy and Amazon.com, and the growth of the maker movement.

By 2011, smartphone sales, rather than general electronics, accounted for half of the chain's revenue. The traditional RadioShack clientele of do-it-yourself tinkerers were increasingly sidelined. Electronic parts formerly stocked in stores were now mostly only available through on-line special order. Store employees concentrated efforts selling profitable mobile contracts, while other customers seeking assistance were neglected and left the stores in frustration.

Demand for consumer electronics was also increasingly being weakened by consumers buying the items online.

==== 2004: "Fix 1500" initiative ====
In early 2004, RadioShack introduced Fix 1500, a sweeping program to "correct" inventory and profitability issues company-wide. The program put the 1,500 lowest-graded store managers, of over 5,000, on notice of the need to improve. Managers were graded not on tangible store and personnel data but on one-on-one interviews with district management.

Typically, a 90-day period was given for the manager to improve (thus causing another manager to then be selected for Fix 1500). A total of 1,734 store managers were reassigned as sales associates or terminated in a 6-month period. Also, during this period, RadioShack cancelled the employee stock purchase plan. By the first quarter of 2005, the metrics of skill assessment used during Fix 1500 had already been discarded; the corporate officer who created the program had also resigned.

In 2004, RadioShack was the target of a class-action lawsuit in which more than 3,300 current or former RadioShack managers alleged the company required them to work long hours without overtime pay. In an attempt to suppress the news, the company launched a successful strategic lawsuit against public participation against Bradley D. Jones, the webmaster of RadioShackSucks.com and a former RadioShack dealer for 17 years.

==== 2006: Management problems ====
On February 20, 2006, CEO David Edmondson admitted to "misstatements" on his curriculum vitae and resigned after the Fort Worth Star-Telegram debunked his claim to degrees in theology and psychology from Heartland Baptist Bible College.

Chief operating officer Claire Babrowski briefly took over as CEO and president. A 31-year veteran of McDonald's Corporation, where she had been vice president and Chief Restaurant Operations Officer, Babrowski had joined RadioShack several months prior. She left the company in August 2006, later becoming CEO and Executive Vice President of Toys "R" Us.

RadioShack's board of directors appointed Julian C. Day as chairman and chief executive officer on July 7, 2006. Day had financial experience and had played a key role in revitalizing such companies as Safeway, Sears and Kmart but lacked any practical front-line sales experience needed to run a retail company. The Consumerist named him one of the "10 Crappiest CEOs" of 2009 (among consumer-facing companies, according to their own employees). He resigned in May 2011.

RadioShack Chief Financial Officer James Gooch succeeded Day as CEO in 2011, but "agreed to step down" 16 months later following a 73% plunge in the price of the stock. On February 11, 2013, RadioShack Corp. hired Joseph C. Magnacca from Walgreens, because he had experience in retail.

==== 2006: Corporate layoffs and new strategy ====
In the spring of 2006, RadioShack announced a strategy to increase average unit volume, lower overhead costs, and grow profitable square footage. In early to mid-2006, RadioShack closed nearly 500 locations. It was determined that some stores were too close to each other, causing them to compete with one another for the same customers. Most of the stores closed in 2006 brought in less than US$350,000 in revenue each year.

Despite these actions, stock prices plummeted within what was otherwise a booming market. On August 10, 2006, RadioShack announced plans to eliminate a fifth of its company headquarters workforce to reduce overhead expense, improving its long-term competitive position while supporting a significantly smaller number of stores. On Tuesday, August 29, the affected workers received an e-mail: "The work force reduction notification is currently in progress. Unfortunately your position is one that has been eliminated." Four hundred and three workers were given 30 minutes to collect their personal effects, say their goodbyes to co-workers and then attend a meeting with their senior supervisors. Instead of issuing severance payments immediately, the company withheld them to ensure that company-issued BlackBerrys, laptops and cellphones were returned. This move drew immediate widespread public criticism for its lack of sensitivity.

==== 2009: Customer relations problems ====
RadioShack and the Better Business Bureau of Fort Worth, Texas, met on April 23, 2009, to discuss unanswered and unresolved complaints. The company implemented a plan of action to address existing and future customer service issues. Stores were directed to post a sign with the district manager's name, the question "How Are We Doing?" and a direct toll-free number to the individual district office for their area. RadioShackHelp.com was created as another portal for customers to resolve their issues through the Internet. As of 2012, the BBB had upgraded RadioShack from an "F" to an "A" rating; this was changed to "no rating" after the 2015 bankruptcy filing.

According to an experience ratings report published by Temkin Group, an independent research firm, RadioShack was ranked as the retailer with the worst overall customer experience; it maintained this position for six consecutive years.

==== 2012–2014: Financial distress ====
From 2000 to 2011, RadioShack spent US$2.6 billion repurchasing its own stock in an attempt to prop up a share price which fell from US$24.33 to US$2.53; the buyback and the stock dividend were suspended in 2012 to conserve cash and reduce debt as the company continued to lose money. Company stock had declined 81 percent since 2010 and was trading well below book value. The stock reached an all-time low on April 14, 2012. In September 2012, RadioShack's head office laid off 130 workers after a US$21 million quarterly loss. Layoffs continued in August 2013; headquarters employment dropped from more than 2,000 before the 2006 layoffs to slightly fewer than 1,000 in late 2013. At the end of 2013, the chain owned 4,297 US stores.

The company had received a US$250,000,000 cash infusion in 2013 from Salus Capital Partners and Cerberus Capital Management. This debt carried onerous conditions, preventing RadioShack from gaining control over costs by limiting store closures to 200 per year and restricting the company's refinancing efforts. With too many underperforming stores remaining open, the chain continued to spiral toward bankruptcy.

On March 4, 2014, the company announced a net trading loss for 2013 of US$400.2 million, well above the 2012 loss of US$139.4 million, and proposed a restructuring which would close 1,100 lower-performing stores, almost 20% of its US locations. On May 9, 2014, the company reported that creditors had prevented it from carrying out those closures, with one lender presuming fewer stores would mean fewer assets to secure the loan and reduce any recovery it would get in a bankruptcy reorganization.

On June 10, 2014, RadioShack said that it had enough cash to last 12 months, but that lasting a year depended on sales growing. Sales had fallen for nine straight quarters, and by year's end the company realized a loss in "each of its 10 latest quarters". On June 20, 2014, RadioShack's stock price fell below US$1, triggering a July 25 warning from the New York Stock Exchange that it could be delisted for failure to maintain a stock price above $1. On July 28, 2014, Mergermarket's Debtwire reported RadioShack was discussing Chapter 11 bankruptcy protection as an option.

On September 11, 2014, RadioShack admitted it might have to file for bankruptcy, and would be unable to finance its operations "beyond the very near term" unless the company was sold, restructured, or received a major cash infusion. On September 15, 2014, RadioShack replaced its CFO with a bankruptcy specialist. On October 3, RadioShack announced an out-of-court restructuring, a 4:1 dilution of shares, and a rights issue priced at 40 cents a share. RadioShack's stock (NYSE: RSH) was halted on the New York exchange for the entire day. Despite the debt restructuring proposal, in December Salus and Cerberus informed RadioShack that it was in default of the US$250,000,000 they had provided as a cash infusion in 2013.

At the end of October 2014, quarterly figures indicated RadioShack was losing US$1.1 million per day. A November 2014 attempt to keep the stores open from 8AM to midnight on Thanksgiving Day drew a sharp backlash from employees and a few resignations; comparable store sales for the three days (Thursday-Saturday) were 1% lower than the prior year, when the stores were open for two of the days. The company's problems maintaining inventories of big-ticket items, such as Apple's iPhone 6, further cut into sales.

By December 2014, RadioShack was being sued by former employees for having encouraged them to invest 401(k) retirement savings in company stock, alleging a breach of fiduciary duties to "prudently" handle the retirement fund which caused "devastating losses" in the retirement plans as the stock dropped from US$13 in 2011 to 38 cents at the end of 2014. These claims were dismissed by the Fifth U.S. Circuit Court of Appeals in 2018.

==== 2015 bankruptcy ====
"RadioShack died years ago; we're only now holding the funeral. Good active managers have avoided RadioShack for a long time."
– Gershon Distenfeld, Director, AllianceBernstein

On January 15, 2015, The Wall Street Journal reported RadioShack had delayed rent payments to some commercial landlords and was preparing a bankruptcy filing that could come as early as February. Officials of the company declined to comment on the report. A separate report by Bloomberg claimed the company might sell leases to as many as half its stores to Sprint.

On February 2, 2015, the company was delisted from the New York Stock Exchange after its average market capitalization remained below US$50 million for longer than thirty consecutive days. That same day, Bloomberg News reported RadioShack was in talks to sell half of its stores to Sprint and close the rest, which would effectively render RadioShack no longer a stand-alone retailer. Amazon.com and Brookstone were also mentioned to be potential bidders, the former having at the time been wanting to establish a brick and mortar presence. On February 3, RadioShack defaulted on its loan from Salus Capital.

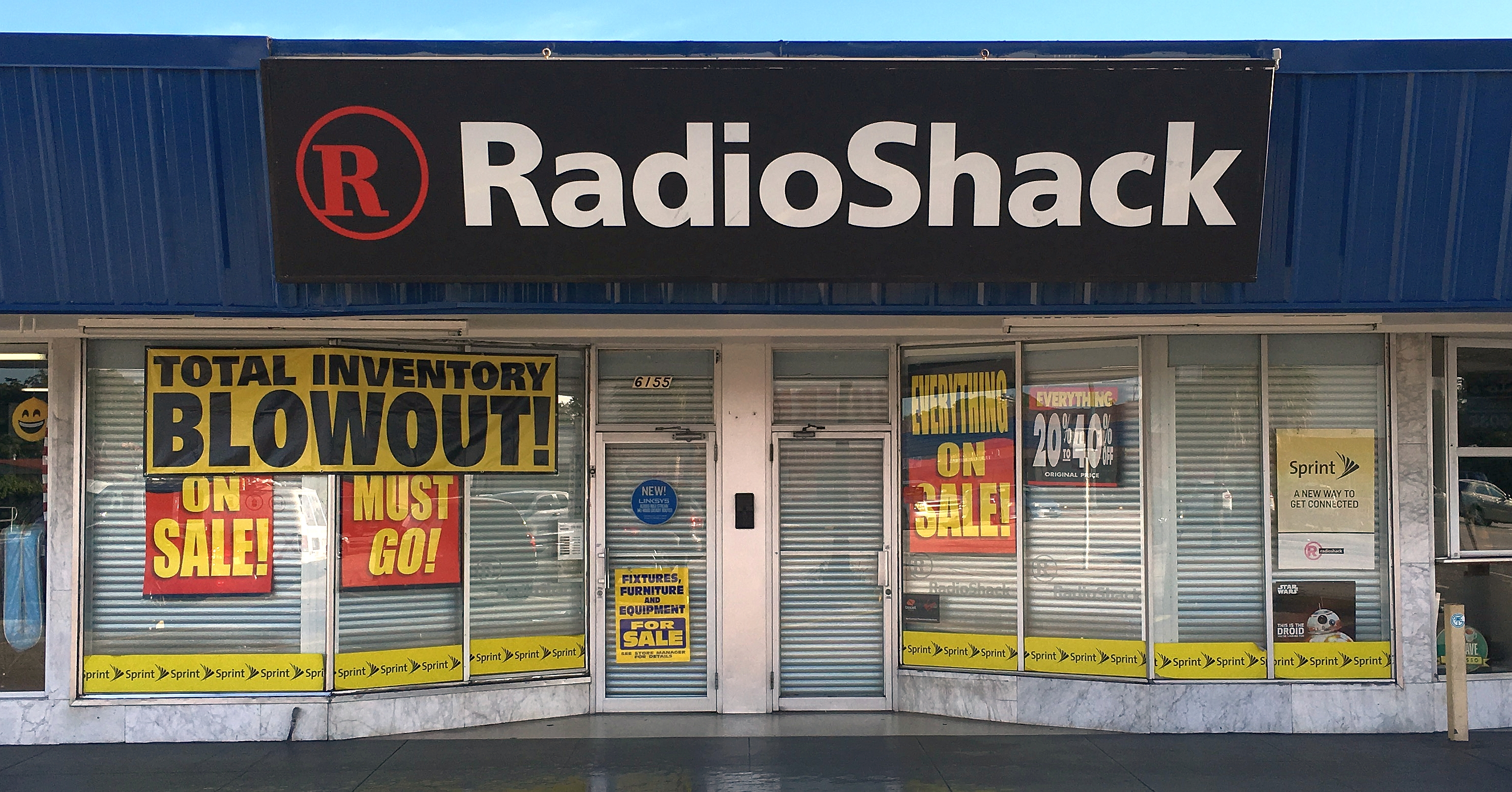
The effects of a liquidation sale at this typical RadioShack outlet in Miami, Florida (2016)

On the days following these reports, some employees were instructed to reduce prices and transfer inventory out of stores designated for closing to those that would remain open during the presumed upcoming bankruptcy proceedings, while the rest remained "in the dark" as to the company's future. Many stores had already closed abruptly on Sunday, February 1, 2015, the first day of the company's fiscal year, with employees only given a few hours advance notice. Some had been open with a skeleton crew, little inventory and reduced hours only because the Salus Capital loan terms limited the chain to 200 store closures a year. A creditor group alleged the chain had remained on life support instead of shutting down earlier and cutting its losses merely so that Standard General could avoid paying on credit default swaps which expired on December 20, 2014.

On February 5, 2015, RadioShack announced that it had filed for Chapter 11 bankruptcy protection. Using bankruptcy to end contractual restrictions that had required it keep unprofitable stores open, the company immediately published a list of 1784 stores which it intended to close, a process it wished to complete by the month's end to avoid an estimated US$7 million in March rent.

Customers had initially been given until March 6, 2015, to return merchandise or redeem unused gift cards. However, after legal pressure from the Attorneys General of several states, RadioShack ultimately agreed to reimburse customers for the value of unused gift cards.

RadioShack was criticized for including the personally identifying information of 67 million of its customers as part of its assets for sale during the proceedings, despite its long-standing policy and a promise to customers that data would never be sold for any reason at any time. The Federal Trade Commission and the Attorneys General of 38 states fought against this proposal. The sale of this data was ultimately approved, albeit greatly reduced from what was initially proposed.

=== General Wireless Operations, Inc. ===
On March 31, 2015, the bankruptcy court approved a US$160 million offer by the Standard General affiliate General Wireless Operations, Inc., gaining ownership of 1,743 RadioShack locations. As part of the deal, the company entered into a partnership with Sprint, in which the company would become a co-tenant at 1,435 RadioShack locations and establish store within a store areas devoted to selling its wireless brands, including Sprint, Boost Mobile and Virgin Mobile. The stores would collect commissions on the sale of Sprint products, and Sprint would assist in promotion. Sprint stated that this arrangement would increase the company's retail footprint by more than double; the company previously had around 1,100 company-owned retail outlets, in comparison to the over 2,000 run by AT&T Mobility. Although they would be treated as a co-tenant, a mockup showed Sprint branding being more prominent in promotion and exterior signage than that of RadioShack. The acquisition did not include rights to RadioShack's intellectual property (such as its trademarks), rights to RadioShack's franchised locations, and customer records, which were to be sold separately.

Re-branded stores soft launched on April 10, 2015, with a preliminary conversion of the stores' existing wireless departments to exclusively house Sprint brands, with all stores eventually to be renovated in waves to allocate larger spaces for Sprint. In May 2015, the acquisition of the "RadioShack" name and its assets by General Wireless for US$26.2 million was finalized. Chief marketing officer Michael Tatelman emphasized that the company that emerged from the 2015 proceedings is an entirely new company, and went on to affirm that the old RadioShack did not re-emerge from bankruptcy, calling it "defunct".

Less than one year after the bankruptcy events of 2015, Ron Garriques and Marty Amschler stepped down from their respective chief executive officer and chief financial officer positions; Garriques had held his position for nine months.

==== 2017 bankruptcy ====
It was speculated on March 2, 2017, that General Wireless was preparing to take RadioShack through its second bankruptcy in two years. This was evidenced when dozens of corporate office employees were laid off and two hundred stores were planned to be shuttered, and further evidenced when the RadioShack website began displaying "all sales final" banners for in-store purchases at all locations.

RadioShack's Chapter 11 bankruptcy was formally filed on March 8, 2017. Of the then 1,300 remaining stores, several hundred were converted into Sprint-only locations.

Despite declaring Chapter 11 bankruptcy (typically reserved for reorganization of debt) instead of Chapter 7 (liquidation), the company engaged in liquidation of all inventory, supplies, and store fixtures, as well as auctioning off old memorabilia. On May 26, RadioShack announced plans to close all but 70 corporate stores and shift its business primarily to online. These stores closed after Memorial Day Weekend of 2017. Of the remaining stores, 50 more closed by the end of June 2017.

One particular store closing in April 2017 garnered widespread media attention when a Facebook account, calling itself "RadioShack – Reynoldsburg, Ohio", began posting aggressive messages alluding to the bankruptcy, such as "We closed. Fuck you all." RadioShack addressed these posts on their official Facebook page denying any involvement.

On June 29, 2017, RadioShack's creditors sued Sprint, claiming that it sabotaged its co-branded locations with newly built Sprint retail stores—which were constructed near well-performing RadioShack locations as determined by confidential sales information. The suit argued that Sprint's actions "destroyed nearly 6,000 RadioShack jobs".

General Wireless announced plans on June 12, 2017, to auction off the RadioShack name and IP, with bidding to begin on July 18. Bidding concluded on July 19, 2017, when one of RadioShack's creditors, Kensington Capital Holdings, obtained the RadioShack brand and other intellectual properties for US$15 million. Kensington was the sole bidder.

In October 2017, General Wireless officially exited bankruptcy and was allowed to retain the company's warehouse, e-commerce site, dealer network operations, and up to 28 stores.

==== Post-bankruptcy ====
RadioShack began shrinking its U.S. headquarters operation in 2017. By September of that year, it had a staff of 50 and moved to RadioShack's distribution center on Terminal Road just north of the Fort Worth Stockyards.

In late July 2018, RadioShack partnered up with HobbyTown USA to open up around 100 RadioShack "Express" stores. HobbyTown owners select which RadioShack products to carry.

RadioShack dealerships had re-opened around 500 stores by October 2018. By November 2018, it had signed 77 of HobbyTown's 137 franchise stores.

=== Retail Ecommerce Ventures (REV) ===
In November 2020, RadioShack's intellectual property and its remaining operations—about 400 independent authorized dealers, about 80 Hobbytown USA affiliate stores, and its online sales operation—were purchased by Retail Ecommerce Ventures (REV), a Florida-based company that had previously purchased defunct retailers Pier 1 Imports, Dress Barn, Modell's Sporting Goods, and Linens 'n Things, along with The Franklin Mint.

In December 2021, REV announced they would use part of the brand name on a cryptocurrency platform called RadioShack DeFi (an abbreviation of decentralized finance). The platform would allow customers to exchange and freely swap existing cryptocurrency tokens for a token called $RADIO through the new platform.

The Twitter account for RadioShack gained notoriety in June 2022 when it began posting tweets with not safe for work content in an effort to attract attention towards its cryptocurrency platform, then renamed RadioShack Swap. The strategy, directed by chief marketing officer Ábel Czupor, received a mixed reaction among dealers; HobbyTown USA subsequently terminated its relationship with RadioShack in response to customer confusion surrounding the posts.

== Corporate headquarters ==
In the 1970s RadioShack had a new headquarters "Tandy Towers" built in downtown Fort Worth on Throckmorton Street. In 2001, RadioShack bought the former Ripley Arnold public housing complex in Downtown Fort Worth along the Trinity River for US$20 million. The company razed the complex and had a 900,000-square-foot (84,000 m^{2}) corporate headquarters campus built, after the city of Fort Worth approved a 30-year economic agreement to ensure that the company stayed in Fort Worth. RadioShack moved into the campus in 2005.

In 2009, with two years left on a rent-free lease of the building, the Fort Worth Star-Telegram reported that the company was considering a new site for its headquarters. The Tampa Bay Business Journal reported rumors among Tampa Bay Area real estate brokers and developers that RadioShack might select Tampa as the site of its headquarters.

In 2010, however, RadioShack announced efforts to remain at its current site. The headquarters was ultimately reduced to a small group after the second bankruptcy filing. In September 2017, what was left of RadioShack (about 50 people) left the downtown location, moving to a warehouse on Terminal Road just north of "The Stockyards".

== Non-American operations ==
=== InterTAN Inc. ===
In 1986, Tandy Corp. announced it would create a spinoff of its international retail operations, called InterTAN Inc. The new company would take over operations of over 2,000 international company-owned and franchised stores, while Tandy retained its 7,253 domestic outlets and 30 of its manufacturing facilities. InterTAN had two main units, Tandy Electronics Ltd., which operated in Canada, the UK, France, Belgium, West Germany, and the Netherlands; and Tandy Australia Ltd., which operated in Australia.

At the end of 1989, there were 1,417 stores operated by InterTAN under the Tandy or Radio Shack names. InterTAN operated Tandy or Radio Shack stores in the UK until 1999 and Australia until 2001. RadioShack branded merchandise accounted for 9.5% of InterTAN's inventory purchases in its 2002–2003 fiscal year, the last complete year before the Circuit City acquisition, and later disappeared from stores entirely.

=== Canada ===
Following the creation of InterTAN, Tandy Electronics operated 873 stores in Canada, and owned the rights to the RadioShack name. In 2004, Circuit City purchased InterTAN, which held the rights to use the RadioShack name in Canada until 2010. Radio Shack Corp., which operated Radio Shack stores in the US, sued InterTAN in an attempt to end the contract for the company name early. On March 24, 2005, a US district court judge ruled in favour of RadioShack, requiring InterTAN stop using the brand name in products, packaging or advertising by June 30, 2005. The Canadian stores were rebranded under the name "The Source by Circuit City". Radio Shack briefly re-entered the Canadian market, but eventually closed all stores to refocus attention on its core US business.

The Source was acquired by BCE Inc. in 2009. In January 2024, Bell announced a brand licensing agreement with its competitor Best Buy, which will see its locations rebranded as Best Buy Express and integrated into Best Buy's retail network, but remain under the ownership of BCE.

=== Asia ===
In March 2012, Malaysian company Berjaya Retail Berhad, entered into a franchising agreement with Radio Shack. Later that year, the company announced a second franchising deal with Chinese company, Cybermart.

Berjaya had six stores in Malaysia before it quietly ceased operations in 2017.

=== Mexico ===
RadioShack de México S.A. de C.V.
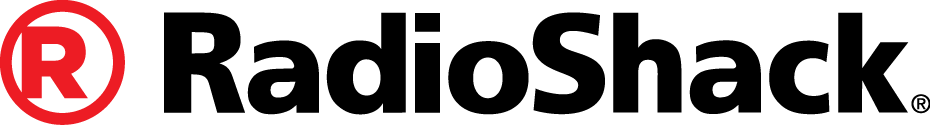
- Amamos la technología

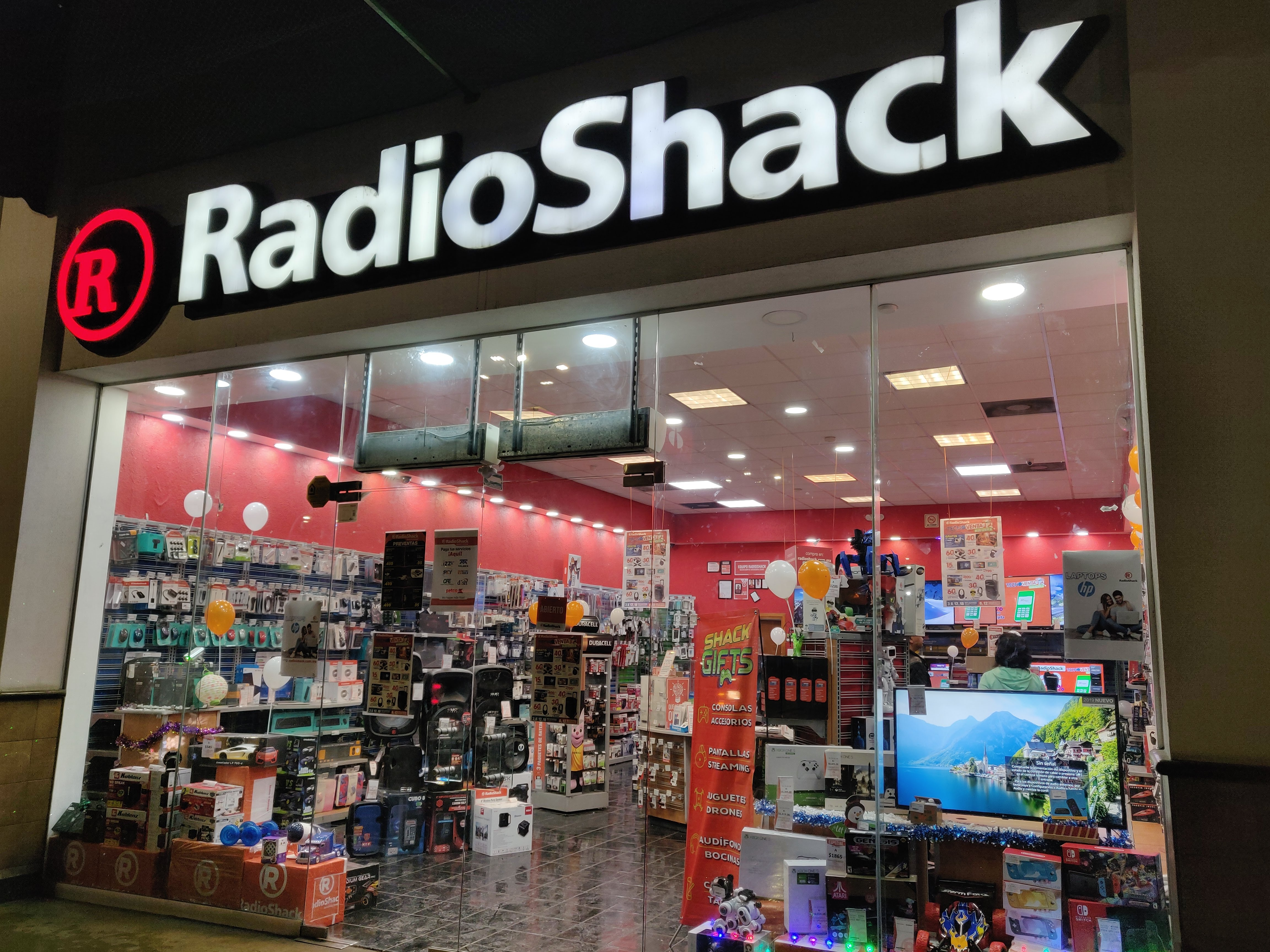
- RadioShack store in the Macroplaza shopping mall in Tijuana, Mexico (2019)
- Trade name: RadioShack
- Type: Subsidiary
- Industry: E-commerce, retail
- Founded: 1986; 40 years ago Mexico City, Mexico
- Headquarters: Mexico City, Mexico
- Number of locations: 225 (all company owned)
- Area served: Mexico
- Products: Consumer electronics
- Parent: Grupo Gigante (2015–present)
- Website: www.radioshack.com.mx

In 1986, Grupo Gigante signed a deal with Tandy Corporation to operate Radio Shack branded stores in Mexico. After growing their electronics chain within Mexico to 24 stores, Grupo Gigante signed a new deal with Tandy in 1992 to form a new joint ventured called Radio Shack de México

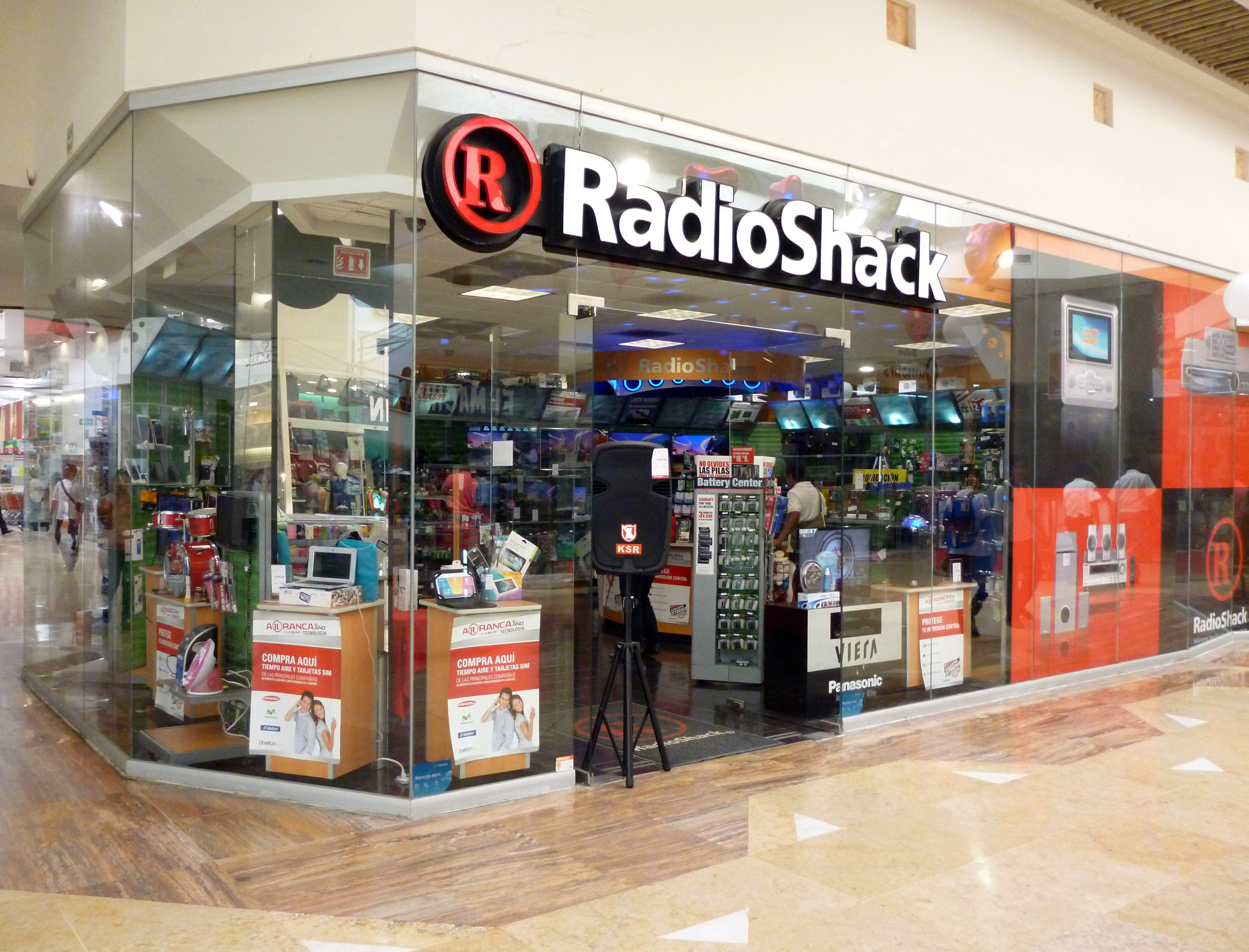
RadioShack store in a shopping mall in Puerto Vallarta, Mexico (2005)

in which both companies had an equal share. As part of the deal, Grupo Gigante transferred their electronics stores to Radio Shack de México.

In 2008, Grupo Gigante separated from Radio Shack, (then renamed Radio Shack Corporation) and sold its share of the joint venture to Radio Shack Corp. for $42.3 million.

In June 2015, Grupo Gigante repurchased 100 percent of RadioShack de Mexico, including stores, warehouses, and all related brand names and intellectual properties for use within Mexico, from the US Bankruptcy Court in Delaware for US$31.5 million. The chain had 247 stores in Mexico at the time of the sale. Following the sale, all Radio Shack stores, warehouses, brands, assets, and related trademarks in Mexico are currently owned by RadioShack de México S.A. de C.V., a subsidiary of Grupo Gigante.

A major Mexican news magazine had reported in March 2015 that Grupo Gigante actually purchased 100% of the stock in RadioShack de México from RadioShack Corporation for US$31.8 million, two months prior to the bankruptcy filing, but had only had to hand over US$11.8 million to RadioShack Corp. for also assuming approximately US$20 million in debt liabilities.

While Radio Shack was facing a second bankruptcy in the United States, Grupo Gigante announced in October 2017 that they planned to expand the Radio Shack brand within Mexico by opening eight more stores.

=== Latin America & the Caribbean ===
RadioShack (Unicomer)
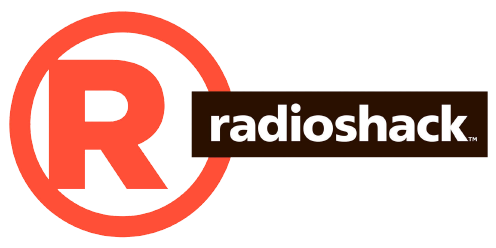
- Trade name: radioshack
- Type: Subsidiary
- Industry: E-commerce, retail
- Predecessor: RadioShack Corporation
- Founded: January 1998; 28 years ago El Salvador
- Headquarters: San Salvador, El Salvador
- Number of locations: 60 (company owned); 245 (franchised)
- Area served: Central America, South America, Caribbean
- Products: Consumer electronics
- Parent: Grupo Unicomer
- Website: radioshackla.com

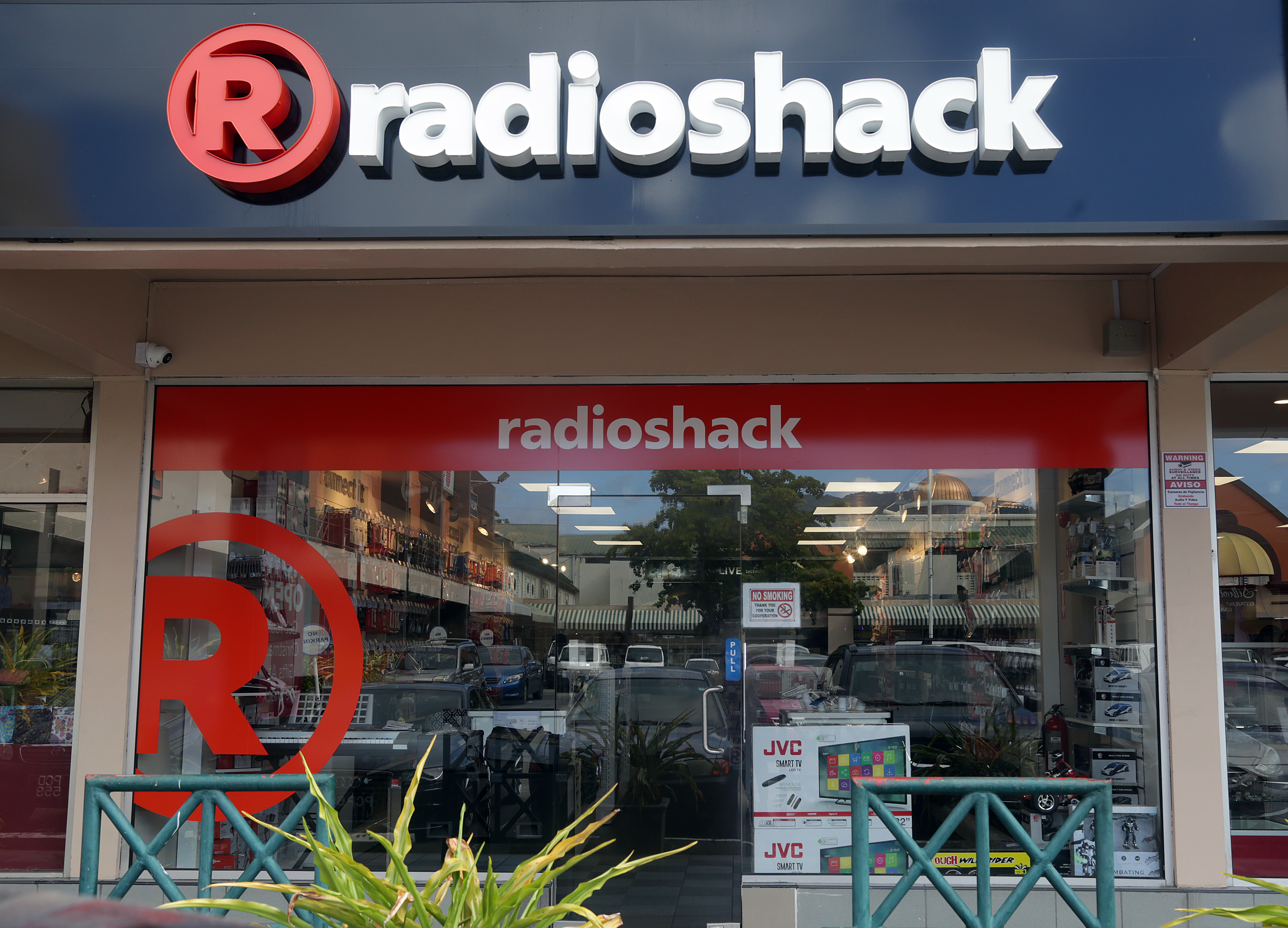
RadioShack store in Trinidad (2017), showing the slightly different logo used by Unicomer

When Radio Shack Corporation filed for bankruptcy the first time in 2015, the Unicomer Group (Grupo Unicomer) purchased the Radio Shack brand from the bankruptcy court for its exclusive use in Latin America and the Caribbean, except Mexico. Unicomer, through its corporate parent Regal Forest Holding Co. Ltd., paid $5 million for the brand.

The company's relationship with Radio Shack dated back to 1998, when Unicomer opened its first Radio Shack franchise store in El Salvador. It later expanded into Honduras, Guatemala, and Nicaragua. By January 2015, Unicomer had 57 Radio Shack stores distributed throughout four countries within Central America.

In April 2015, Unicomer began receiving franchise payments from franchises in several countries that Unicomer had not previously had a business presence in. It expanded into Trinidad in 2016, Jamaica in 2017, Barbados in 2017, and Guyana in 2017.

By the end of 2017, Unicomer had company-owned stores located in the countries of Barbados, El Salvador, Guatemala, Guyana, Honduras, Jamaica, Nicaragua, and Trinidad while receiving franchise payments from independent franchised stores located in the countries of Antigua, Aruba, Costa Rica, Paraguay and Peru in which Unicomer did not have a business presence in. Since 2014, the independent company Coolbox is an authorized dealer for RadioShack products in Peru.

In April 2018, the RadioShack brand returned to Bolivia when franchisee Cosworld Trading opened two franchised stores for Unicomer in the capital city of La Paz. The previous RadioShack stores had closed in 2015 as a result of RadioShack first bankruptcy filing.

=== Middle East ===
Radio Shack Egypt
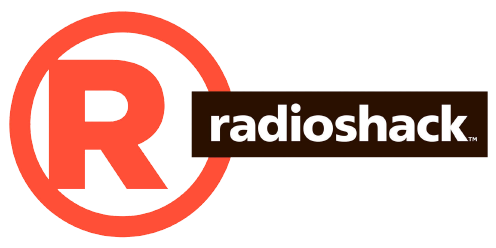
- Trade name: RadioShack
- Type: Subsidiary
- Industry: E-commerce, retail
- Predecessor: RadioShack Corporation
- Founded: 1998; 28 years ago Nasr City, Egypt
- Headquarters: Giza, Egypt
- Number of locations: 65 (company owned); 15 (franchised)
- Area served: Egypt
- Products: Consumer electronics
- Parent: Delta RS for Trading
- Website: radioshack.com.eg

When Radio Shack filed for bankruptcy the first time in 2015, the Egypt-based Delta RS for Trading purchased the Radio Shack brand from the bankruptcy court for its exclusive use in Middle East and North Africa for $US5 million.

Delta RS for Trading, as Radio Shack Egypt, had opened its first Radio Shack franchised store in 1998 in Nasr City. By March 2003, Radio Shack Egypt had 65 company-operated stores plus 15 sub-franchised stores. In 2017, the Egyptian government accused Radio Shack Egypt and its parent Delta RS in aiding the Muslim Brotherhood.

== Other operations ==
=== Corporate citizenship ===
In 2006, RadioShack supported the National Center for Missing & Exploited Children by providing store presence for the StreetSentz program, a child identification and educational kit offered to families without charge. RadioShack supported United Way of America Charities to assist their Oklahoma and Texas relief efforts after the 2013 Moore tornado. RadioShack's green initiative promotes the Rechargeable Battery Recycling Corporation, which accepts end-of-life rechargeable batteries and wireless phones dropped off in-store to be safely recycled.

=== Other retailer partnerships ===
In August 2001, RadioShack opened kiosk-style stores inside Blockbuster outlets, only to abandon the project in February 2002; CEO Len Roberts announced that the stores did not meet expectations.

RadioShack operated wireless kiosks within 417 Sam's Club discount warehouses from 2004 to 2011. The kiosk operations, purchased from Arizona-based Wireless Retail Inc, operated as a subsidiary, SC Kiosks Inc., with employees contracted through RadioShack Corporation. No RadioShack-branded merchandise was sold. The kiosks closed in 2011, costing RadioShack an estimated US$10–15 million in 2011 operating income.

RadioShack then attempted a joint venture with Target to deploy mobile telephone kiosks in 1,490 Target stores by April 2011. In April 2013, RadioShack's partnership with Target ended and the Target Mobile in-store kiosks were turned over to a new partnership with Brightstar and MarketSource.

==== No-contract wireless ====
On September 5, 2012, RadioShack in a partnership with Cricket Wireless, began offering its own branded no-contract wireless services using Cricket and Sprint's nationwide networks. The service was discontinued on August 7, 2014; clients who had already purchased the service from RadioShack continue to receive service from Cricket Wireless.

=== Cycling team sponsorship ===
In 2009, the company became the main sponsor of a new cycling team, Team RadioShack, with Lance Armstrong and Johan Bruyneel. RadioShack featured Armstrong in a number of television commercials and advertising campaigns. RadioShack came under fire for having Armstrong as a spokesperson in 2011, when allegations that the cyclist had used performance-enhancing drugs surfaced.

== Lawsuits ==
In September 1999, AutoZone, Inc., sued Tandy Corp., then the owner of RadioShack, in a federal district court in Tennessee for infringing the AutoZone trademark by using the name "PowerZone" for a section in RadioShack's retail stores. In November 2001, the district court granted Tandy's motion for summary judgment to dismiss the case, finding that AutoZone failed to prove that the use of "PowerZone" infringed the "AutoZone" trademark. AutoZone appealed that decision. In June 2004, the federal court of appeals affirmed the district court's dismissal of the case.

In June 2011, a customer sued Sprint and RadioShack after finding pornography on their newly purchased cell phones.

In 2012, a Denver jury awarded $674,938 to David Nelson, a 25-year RadioShack employee who had been fired in retaliation for complaining about age discrimination.

In 2013, a federal jury awarded over $1 million in an age discrimination suit to a longtime RadioShack store manager who was fired in 2010 from the San Francisco store he had managed since 1998.

In July 2014, in Verderame v. RadioShack Corp., the U.S. District Court for the Eastern District of Pennsylvania found that RadioShack owed its store managers in Pennsylvania a possible US$5.8 million for unpaid overtime.

== In popular culture ==
- In the 1980 film Used Cars, an electronics engineer needs equipment to do some last-minute repairs to a bootleg microwave transmitter, and says to his partner, "RadioShack closes in half an hour."
- A "Radio Shock" store (owned by the "Tandy Corporation") appeared in the original 1991 release of Space Quest IV, displaced by "Hz. So Good" in later editions because of threats of legal action by Tandy.
- RadioShack is featured prominently in Short Circuit 2, which serves as a "clinic" for Johnny 5 while he repairs himself after being assaulted by thieves.
- RadioShack is mentioned and briefly featured on the pilot episode of Young Sheldon. Visits to RadioShack are a frequent plot point in the Young Sheldon series, building off allusions to childhood visits made by the character Sheldon Cooper in its parent series, The Big Bang Theory. The family returns to the RadioShack store in a later episode, where his mother purchases him a Tandy 1000.
- RadioShack appears in the second season of the Netflix series Stranger Things as the workplace of Bob Newby. In one scene, an Armatron (a product actually sold at RadioShack during that period) can be seen on a shelf above his head.
- In the pilot episode of The West Wing, a flight attendant tells Toby Ziegler he can't use his cell phone until they land as it interferes with the plane's navigation system and he replies, "Are you telling me I can still flummox this thing with something I bought at Radio Shack?".
- In the 2001 re-make of the 1960 movie Ocean's Eleven, after Livingston asks an FBI agent to not touch his equipment by asking, "Do you see me grabbing the gun out of your holster and waving it around?", the agent retorts with "Hey 'RadioShack', relax".
- American sportswriter and YouTuber Jon Bois worked at RadioShack sometime in the early to mid 2000s, later publishing multiple articles detailing his personal experiences as an employee.
