= Wakefield Crossing Shopping Center =

Shopping center in Raleigh, North Carolina

- Location: Raleigh, North Carolina
- Coordinates: 35°56′29″N 78°33′34″W
- Address: 13200 Falls of Neuse Rd.
- Opened: 2001
- Floor area: 75,927 sq ft (7,053.8 m^{2})

Wakefield Crossing Shopping Center is a grocery-anchored shopping center located in Raleigh, North Carolina. The center contains a number of large and small businesses including grocery stores, restaurants and more. In February 2023, the shopping center was sold to the Washington, D.C.–based firm Granite Canyon Partners for 14.3 million dollars.

== History ==
It was constructed in 2001 with a total area of 75,927 sq ft (7,053.8 m^{2}). Situated in the Raleigh submarket within 30 miles of Research Triangle Park, UNC Chapel Hill, Duke University, NC State University, and the Raleigh-Durham International Airport, its location is ideal. In the same year a Food Lion would be built in the center, taking up about 50% of the gross leasable area and anchoring the center. Tuesday Morning soon after.

On February 16, 2023, the center's second anchor store_{,} Tuesday Morning, announced its closure after its parent company filed for Chapter 11 Bankruptcy. On February 28, 2023, the Blackstone Inc. real estate investment trust "Preferred Apartment Communities" sold the center through JLL to Granite Canyon Partners based in Washington, D.C. Granite Canyon Partners sold the center to Wakefield Wellons, LLC. Annually, the center has an average of 791,000 visits per year.

Tuesday Morning's closure left only Food Lion and Subway as the major businesses in the main parcels while McDonald's and Exxon are located in the outparcels.

== Crime ==
While crime is often low in and around the center a double homicide occurred in the parking lot in June 2020 and an armed robbery at the Subway in August 2023.
