= Ralph & Russo =

British fashion house

- Type: Privately held
- Industry: Fashion
- Founded: 2006 (20 years ago) at London, United Kingdom
- Founder: Tamara Ralph & Michael Russo
- Headquarters: London, United Kingdom, London
- Key people: Tamara Ralph, Creative Director; Michael Russo, CEO
- Products: Haute couture; Accessories
- Number of employees: 450 (2017)
- Website: www.ralphandrusso.com

Ralph & Russo is a European privately held company founded by Tamara Ralph and Michael Russo. Ralph & Russo is a high fashion house that specialises in haute couture and ready-to-wear clothes, luxury goods, and fashion accessories.

The company was put into administration in March 2020 and its founders are being investigated for the misappropriation of funds and raiding on employee super accounts.

== History ==
The firm was founded in 2006 by duo Tamara Ralph and Michael Russo as a privately held company. The fashion house began in Mayfair, London, following in the city's rich history of couture fashion houses.

In 2014, it was announced that Ralph & Russo had become the first British fashion house in over a century to be accredited by the Chambre Syndicale de la Haute Couture. It took them 8 years before nomination. They are still the only British fashion house to hold the accreditation.

Ralph & Russo opened its first store in London with a second in Paris on Rue Francois 1er fr shortly after. In 2015, the brand opened its first boutique in the London department store, Harrods. and has outlined plans to open further stores in America, Europe and Asia. Since then, the brand has expanded beyond Europe, opening two stores in the Middle East. The first in Doha, Qatar and the second in Dubai, United Arab Emirates. More recently, Ralph & Russo opened its third European store in Monaco.

On 17 March 2021, Ralph & Russo was placed into administration, and it has been announced that the company will continue to operate throughout this time. In July 2021 it was announced that an investment resulting in a controlling position in the ownership of Ralph & Russo and its exit from administration was made by Retail Ecommerce Ventures, a company led by Tai Lopez.

On 2 March 2023, Retail Ecommerce Ventures, Ralph & Russo's current parent, announced that it was mulling a possible bankruptcy filing.

== Ready-to-wear ==
It was announced that from 2018 onwards, Ralph & Russo would be launching its ready-to-wear collection. It premiered the collection in the spring. Vogue described the collection as a "new iteration of luxury, made in London but cut for everyone who can afford it." The collection was made up of ready-to-wear gowns and evening dresses.

According to an article in Vogue later in 2018, the fall collection focused on "trench dresses and biker jackets with bouclé inserts and a big emphasis on removable arms." The collection included a garment which had previously been worn by Angelina Jolie.

== Notable designs ==
In early 2018, it was announced that Meghan Markle would be wearing a Ralph & Russo gown for her official engagement photo shoot. The dress worn by Markle was originally part of a couture show, a black gown with a beaded bodice.

Later in 2018, Angelina Jolie wore Ralph & Russo for a Royal event celebrating the 200th anniversary of the Order of St Michael and St George.

Indian actress Aishwarya Rai wore Ralph & Russo at Cannes 2015.

== Recognition ==
Ralph & Russo became the first British brand to be elected in almost 100 years by the Chambre Syndicale de la Haute Couture to show its collection on the official schedule at Paris Haute Couture Week.

== Paris Fashion Week ==
Inspired by the South American summer, Ralph & Russo's pieces for Paris Fashion Week featured vibrant colours of orange and pink. The aim of the pieces was to embody various designs for dressy lounging and beachwear, and to take an elegant take on typical summer style. This was the first event to preview R&R's beach and swimwear, in collaboration with La Perla. The event had digital elements such as virtual reality components on the runway, and VR headsets to enhance the viewing experience, designed by PhotonLens.
