= Tai Lopez =

American self-help guru

- Born: Taino Adrian Lopez; April 11, 1977 (age 49); Fullerton, California, U.S.
- Education: North Carolina State University (dropped out)
- Occupation: Self-help promoter
- Known for: Creating and promoting '67 steps' business course Retail Ecommerce Ventures
- Website: www.tailopez.com

Taino Adrian Lopez (born 1977) is an American self-help guru. Lopez went viral in 2015 for an advertisement for his online business course, in which he showed off a Lamborghini while also chastising materialism in favor of knowledge.

In 2019, Lopez co-founded the investment firm and holding company Retail Ecommerce Ventures, which acquired intellectual property of brick-and-mortar stores on the decline. It would be subject in 2025 to a lawsuit by the United States Securities and Exchange Commission alleging it was a Ponzi scheme following an investigation by the Federal Bureau of Investigation.

== Early life and education ==
Tai Lopez was born in Fullerton, California in 1977. His father, a body builder, was arrested for distributing cocaine. Lopez grew up in Long Beach, taking various odd jobs across the United States to earn money. He attended North Carolina State University for a semester before dropping out. From there, he worked in financial-services division of General Electric and had created several dating websites.

== Career ==
In 2014, he created an online business course named "67 Steps to Success", which he described as "learning the 67 steps to become a millionaire, how to live the good life and the grand theory of everything." The course, which cost $67 a month, was criticized for not allowing cancellations and promoting upselling. One of the advertisements for the course, "Here In My Garage,” which extolled the virtues of knowledge over materialism while also showing off his Lamborghini, became viral, prompting parodies and spoofs. Lopez also hosted influencer parties at a Beverly Hills mansion; billionaire Mark Cuban visited Lopez one time in 2015. In early 2022, Lopez launched a line of NFTs, which critics alleged involved siphoning out funds as soon as an NFT was minted.

During the late 2000s, Lopez met Alex Mehr, a co-founder of the dating app Zoosk. Mehr and Lopez initially collaborated by creating MentorBox, a book shipping club, in 2016, but in November 2019, the two founded Retail Ecommerce Ventures, with Lopez serving as the chief executive officer. The company was an investment firm and holding company which sought to pay "discount prices" for the intellectual property of declining brands with brick-and-mortar stores. Using this strategy, the company acquired companies such as Pier 1 Imports, Radio Shack, and Modell's Sporting Goods. To finance these acquisitions, the company raised $230 million from at least 660 investors. However, the payments to investors stopped by December 2022.

== Legal issues ==
On September 22, 2025, the United States Securities and Exchange Commission (SEC) filed a lawsuit against Ecommerce Ventures, alleging that the company was a $112 million Ponzi scheme. They stated that many of the companies run by Ecommerce Ventures were highly unprofitable, causing Lopez to use new investor's funds to pay older investors. They also alleged that Mehr and Lopez embezzled tens of millions of dollars for personal uses. The chief operating officer and cousin to Lopez, Maya Burkenroad, was also accused in the lawsuit of aiding in the crimes of Lopez and Mehr and significantly misrepresenting her work experience. The Federal Bureau of Investigation started contacting investors as part of a criminal investigation, although no charges have been filed as of February 2026. The case was administratively closed while the parties pursued a settlement. In March 2026, the SEC and the three defendants told the court they remained in "active and detailed" settlement negotiations, which had included Zoom presentations and document production reviewed by SEC staff. By July 2026, the SEC reported that it had reached agreement with Mehr and Burkenroad on "all the core terms" and had "finalized a significant portion of the key elements" of a consent judgment with Lopez, with one issue outstanding. Any settlement would require approval by the SEC commissioners in Washington, D.C., and entry by the court. In November 2026 it was reported that Lopez, Mehr, and Burkenroad would pay a combined $6.8 million in penalties and would be temporarily banned from serving as officers or directors of public companies in the proposed settlement.
