= Retail Ecommerce Ventures =

American e-commerce company

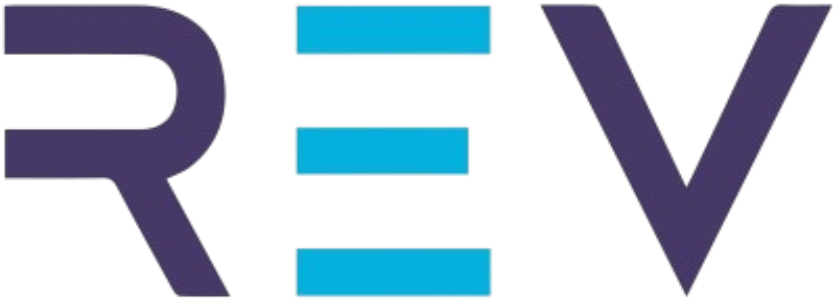
- Type: Private
- Industry: E-commerce
- Founded: 2019
- Founder: Tai Lopez, Alex Mehr
- Headquarters: Miami, Florida, U.S.
- Key people: Alex Mehr (CEO); Tai Lopez (President); Maya Burkenroad (COO)
- Brands: Pier 1 Imports; RadioShack; Modell's Sporting Goods; Dress Barn; Linens 'n Things; The Franklin Mint; Stein Mart; Tuesday Morning; Ralph & Russo; Brahms

Retail Ecommerce Ventures LLC is an American investment firm and holding company created in 2019 by Alex Mehr and Tai Lopez centered around purchasing the intellectual property of declining brick-and-mortar stores to wholly convert their businesses into online retailers. Brands purchased by the company included Pier 1 Imports, Radio Shack, Modell's Sporting Goods, Dressbarn, Linens 'n Things, Stein Mart, Tuesday Morning, Ralph & Russo, and The Franklin Mint.

The company purchased several retailers from 2019 to 2021 for millions of dollars before insolvency issues came to light in 2022. By the end of 2023, most of its assets had been sold to other owners. In 2025, the company was sued by the United States Securities and Exchange Commission, which alleged it was a Ponzi scheme worth $112 million, and placed under investigation by the Federal Bureau of Investigation.

== History ==
=== Founding and acquisitions ===
Tai Lopez and Alex Mehr met in the late 2000s. Lopez was a self-help guru and serial entrepreneur, while Mehr was a former NASA scientist who created and sold the dating app Zoosk in 2019. The two initially collaborated to create a book shipping club called MentorBox in 2016 and an online food store and meat market called FarmersCart in 2018. In November 2019, the two founded Retail Ecommerce Ventures LLC. The aim of the business was to purchase brands the duo felt had fallen behind modern times, particularly after the COVID-19 pandemic, and convert them to all-online businesses.

Acquisitions began in November 2019, when the company purchased the women's apparel retailer Dressbarn for an undisclosed sum, later reported by the Wall Street Journal to be $5 million. Representatives of the company told NBC News that Dressbarn's employee count was reduced from 9,000 to 30 employees, only 15 percent of which were previously with the company. They also stated Dressbarn's sales increased by 165 percent in the first quarter of 2020, forecasting annual sales of $65 million.

In June 2020, the company acquired Pier 1 Imports for a total of $31 million. REV kept only 15 employees dedicated to sales, marketing, and customer support, and hired Pier 1 executive Brian Thompson to serve as the chief merchandising and supply chain officer. On August 6, 2020, the company became the highest bidder in an auction and acquired the intellectual property and ecommerce-related assets of Modell's Sporting Goods for $3.7 million. By late August, Mehr and Lopez had expressed interest in purchasing the IP of Barnes & Noble, American Apparel, and Forever 21, but they concluded each had too high of a price to warrant an acquisition. In November 2020, REV acquired the electronics retailer RadioShack and had an active bid to purchase Stein Mart after it filed for bankruptcy. The bid to buy Stein Mart succeeded later that month, in which REV won the intellectual property of Stein Mart in a bankruptcy auction for $6.02 million.

On June 30, 2021, REV made an agreement to purchase the operations and assets of Ralph & Russo from its founders Tamara Ralph and Michael Russo after it had experienced funding issues in prior months.

In December 2021, RadioShack was relaunched by REV as a cryptocurrency exchange with an edgy Twitter account. The exchange allowed for people to exchange their own cryptocurrency for one which created by RadioShack called $RADIO. Not safe for work content would be posted to RadioShack's Twitter, which would eventually lead to HobbyTown USA exiting a partnership they had with the company.

=== Insolvency ===
In February 2022, Lopez told his team that Dressbarn was currently succeeding, when in actuality it had lost $13.7 million in the previous year. In September 2022, REV invested $35 million in Tuesday Morning after it filed for bankruptcy. This deal almost immediately ran into trouble when Tuesday Morning filed for bankruptcy again in February 2023. In the month following this deal, one investor began having issues with payments to him being delayed by the COO. Lopez also stopped posting on social media, a noted rarity for him. On December 12, 2022, Lopez appeared on the Iced Coffee Hour podcast ran by Graham Stephan claiming that REV was doing well and that he was only taking a break from social media.

Internal documents showed that REV was facing net losses of up to $12 million every month. In November 2022, Mehr sent a gambling-themed email to top investors after taking them on a trip to Las Vegas in an attempt to secure more funding. On December 15, Lopez had his first investor call in weeks, stating that REV could not pay out to investors and was looking to sell its portfolio. Investors stopped receiving payments from the business that month, and some of its brands were taken over by creditors.

In March 2023, REV hired Kirkland & Ellis LLP to explore a restructuring following financial issues. The firm also allegedly backed out of a $5.3 million deal to purchase logistics and labor management company GetSwift, resulting in a lawsuit from GetSwift's bankruptcy lawyers.

In 2023, REV sold RadioShack to Unicomer Group, previously a long-term franchisee of RadioShack, which then relaunched it as an e-commerce platform in 2024. In December 2023, much of Retail Ecommerce Ventures's assets were purchased by Omni Retail Enterprises LLC, a group of secured creditors unrelated to REV, saving much of the brands held by REV.

=== Federal charges ===
On September 22, 2025, the United States Securities and Exchange Commission (SEC) filed a lawsuit against Retail Ecommerce Ventures, alleging that the company was a $112 million Ponzi scheme. They stated that many of the companies ran by REV were highly unprofitable, causing Lopez to use new investor's funds to pay older investors. They also alleged that Mehr and Lopez embezzled tens of millions of dollars for personal uses. Lopez was further accused in the lawsuit of transferring $12.5 million of REV's funds to his personal company.

The chief operating officer and cousin to Lopez, Maya Burkenroad, was also accused in the lawsuit of aiding in the crimes of Lopez and Mehr and significantly misrepresenting her work experience. Burkenroad had stated that she had over 10 years of experience in management of firms with multimillion-dollar valuations, when in actuality she previously worked as a preschool teacher prior to working for the company. Lopez, Mehr and Burkenroad all allegedly sold unsecured notes which promised a 25% annual profit and a 2.1% monthly dividend.

The Federal Bureau of Investigation started contacting investors as part of a criminal investigation, although no charges have been filed as of February 2026.

== Strategy ==
Mehr stated that the threshold for buying a brand was if Lopez determined that "an average Amish person would know the brand." Lopez stated that REV financed their acquisitions through a combination of equity and debt. The company received equity through at least 660 investors who pooled together a total of $230 million. REV would then loan to its subsidiaries with hopes that each would return a profit, relying on social media to maintain their current consumer base after fully transitioning to e-commerce. The stores ran by each brand would be headed by an interim CEO employed by REV and used Shopify Plus to run their storefront operations.

The United States SEC has accused the company in a lawsuit of being a Ponzi Scheme, in which Mehr and Lopez "materially misrepresented" the profitability of their brands from April 2020 to November 2022. The SEC further alleges that $5.9 million worth of funds from previous investors were used to pay out to older investors, in addition to merchant cash advances, external loans, and using funds from other companies in their portfolio. The duo also allegedly embezzled $16 million for their personal use.
