= Pier 1 Imports =

American online retailer

Pier 1 Imports, Inc.
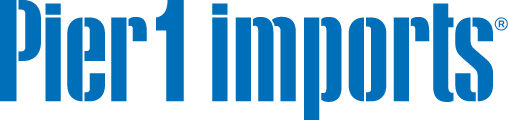
- Type: Public
- Traded as: NYSE: PIR (1970–2020)
- Industry: E-commerce, retail
- Founded: 1962; 64 years ago (as Cost Plus Imports); San Mateo, California, U.S.
- Defunct: October 31, 2020; 5 years ago (as a physical store)
- Fate: Chapter 11 bankruptcy liquidation, in response to the COVID-19 pandemic
- Successor: Retail Ecommerce Ventures (d.b.a. as Pier 1 Imports Online, Inc.)
- Headquarters: Fort Worth, Texas, U.S.
- Number of locations: >1,000 (at peak in January 2020)
- Area served: United States; Canada
- Key people: Robert Riesbeck, CEO Cheryl Bachelder, Interim CEO
- Products: Furniture
- Revenue: ▼US$1.553 billion (FY2019)
- Operating income: ▼US$ −188.1 million (FY2019)
- Net income: ▼US$ −198.8 million (FY2019)
- Total assets: ▼US$ 656.3 million (FY2019)
- Total equity: ▼US$ 89.53 million (FY2019)
- Owner: Retail Ecommerce Ventures
- Number of employees: 18,000 (March 2019)
- Website: www.pier1.com

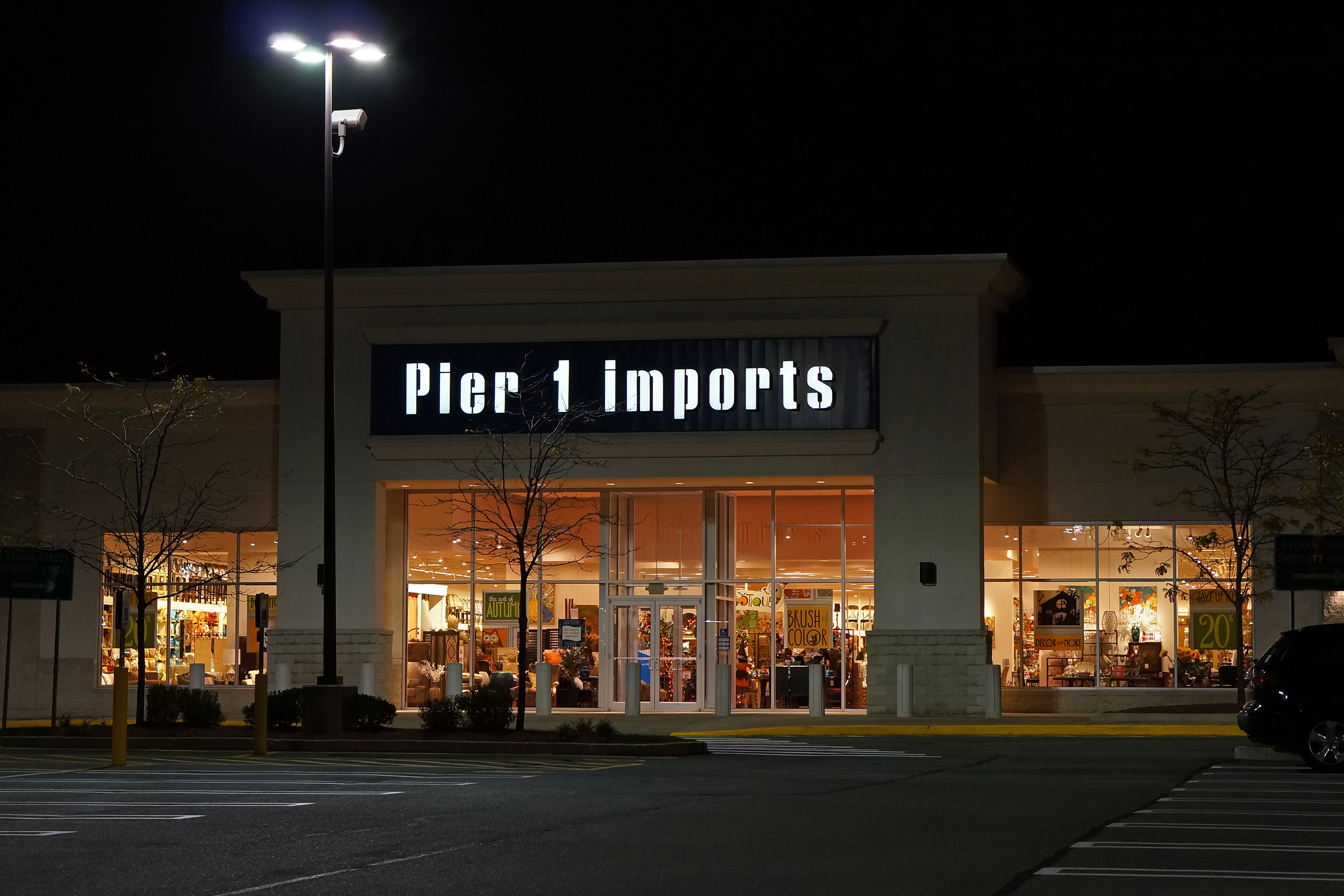
Pier 1 Imports, Liberty Tree Mall, Danvers, Massachusetts (2012)

Pier 1 Imports, Inc., is an online retailer and former Fort Worth, Texas-based retail chain specializing in imported home furnishings and decor, particularly furniture, table-top items, decorative accessories, and seasonal decor. It was publicly traded on the New York Stock Exchange under ticker PIR. In January 2020, Pier 1 had over 1,000 physical stores throughout the United States and Canada. Pier 1 filed for Chapter 11 bankruptcy protection on February 17, 2020, and on May 19, 2020, announced it was asking the bankruptcy court to close all stores in the wake of the COVID-19 pandemic.

In July 2020, Retail Ecommerce Ventures (REV) bought the rights to Pier 1 and planned to revive the brand as an ecommerce store.

At the end of October 2020, Pier 1 Imports closed its remaining stores and transferred its website to REV, which is doing business as Dallas-based Pier 1 Imports Online, Inc.

== History ==
In 1962, Charles D. Tandy and Luther Henderson of the Tandy Corporation provided a loan to the California-based Cost Plus Imports chain in exchange for franchise rights. Their first franchised location opened that year in San Mateo. By 1966, Tandy's and Henderson's franchises had grown to 16 locations in California and Texas. They rebranded their stores Pier 1 Imports, establishing a new corporate headquarters with Radio Shack, another Tandy holding, in Fort Worth, Texas.

Pier 1 went public on the American Stock Exchange in 1970 and later joined the New York Stock Exchange in 1972. At this time, the company had grown to 123 stores, posted 100 percent sales gains for four consecutive years, and opened stores internationally in Australia and Europe. A Pier 1 store in Royal Oak, Michigan, reached annual sales of $1 million in 1979. By 1985, the Pier 1 chain grew to 265 stores, with the management goal of doubling that number by 1990.

Pier 1 had a presence in the Greater Tokyo Area of Japan from April 1996 to early 2002, and its franchised stores were operated by Akatsuki Printing Co. There were 5 stores by early 1997, 16 by fiscal 1998, and 18 by fiscal 1999, but that number shrunk to just 9 by early 2000.

On December 29, 2006, Standard & Poor's bumped Pier 1 Imports Inc. down one spot and off the bottom of the S&P MidCap 400 Index when it added Parametric Technology, a software company. As of December 2012, the company had sales of $418 million.

In April 2008, Pier 1 sold its headquarters building for $104 million.

In May 2017, Alasdair James became CEO following Alex Smith's departure in December 2016. In December 2018, Alasdair James was replaced by veteran CEO Cheryl Bachelder. Bachelder is served as interim CEO until the former Pier 1 CFO, Robert Riesbeck took over in November 2019.

On January 6, 2020, it was announced that Pier 1 will close up to 450 stores, citing "a reduction in corporate headcount".

On February 17, 2020, Pier 1 Imports, Inc. and seven affiliated companies filed Chapter 11 bankruptcy in the United States District Court for the Eastern District of Virginia. As part of the filing, the company is closing all their stores in Canada.

On May 19, 2020, Pier 1 Imports announced that it is asking the bankruptcy court to close all stores, due in large part to the COVID-19 pandemic and failing to find a buyer. On May 30, it was announced that Pier 1 Imports had received court approval to liquidate all locations. Pier 1 announced that they plan to close all stores by the end of October 2020.

In June 2020, Retail Ecommerce Ventures (REV) acquired Pier 1 for $31 million. REV, which was founded by former NASA scientist Alex Mehr and serial entrepreneur Tai Lopez, is a holding company that buys distressed iconic brands and revives them as e-commerce businesses. Other recent acquisitions of REV include Dressbarn and Modell's Sporting Goods. REV acquired control of the Pier 1 website at the end of October 2020, just about the time the last store had closed, and moved on-line operations to Dallas.

On March 2, 2023, Retail Ecommerce Ventures, Pier 1 Imports' current parent, announced that it was mulling a possible bankruptcy filing.

== Merchandise ==
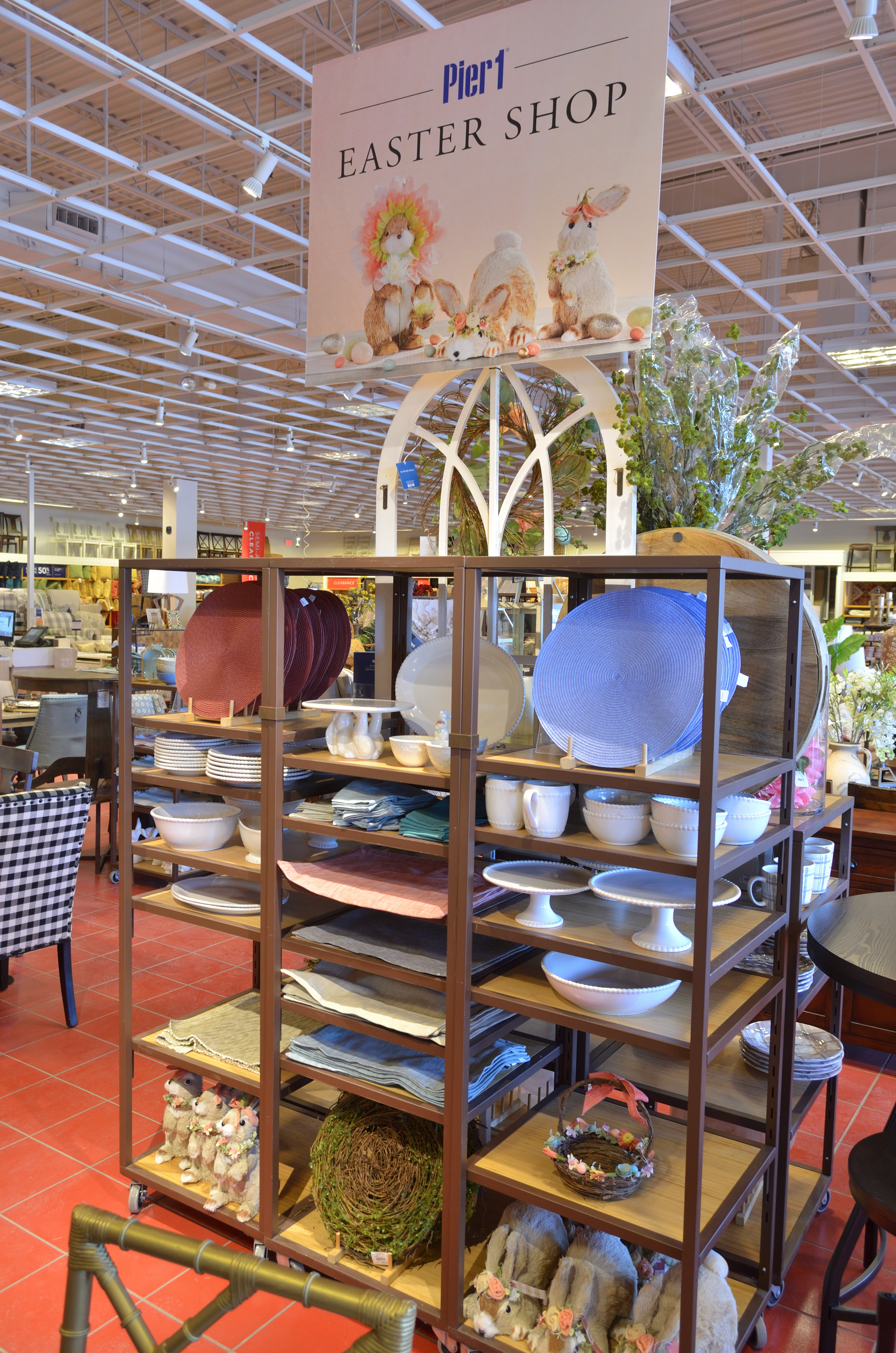
Inside a typical Pier 1 Imports store (2020)

Pier 1 merchandise consists of home furnishings and accessories such as candles, vases, and picture frames as well as full-sized upholstered furniture, hand-carved armoires, large-scale vases and eclectic wall décor. Items are imported, created in conjunction with foreign designers, or produced by Pier 1's Trend and Product Development team.

== Partnerships ==
Pier 1 became a corporate partner of the U.S. Fund for UNICEF in 1985. As of 2013, this partnership had generated more than $42 million by selling UNICEF greeting cards, cause marketing, and emergency relief for Afghanistan, Haiti, and Iraq, as well as areas affected by the Indian Ocean tsunami.

Former spokespeople for the company, seen largely in broadcast commercials, include Cheers alumna Kirstie Alley and Thom Filicia of Queer Eye for the Straight Guy.

== Gallery ==
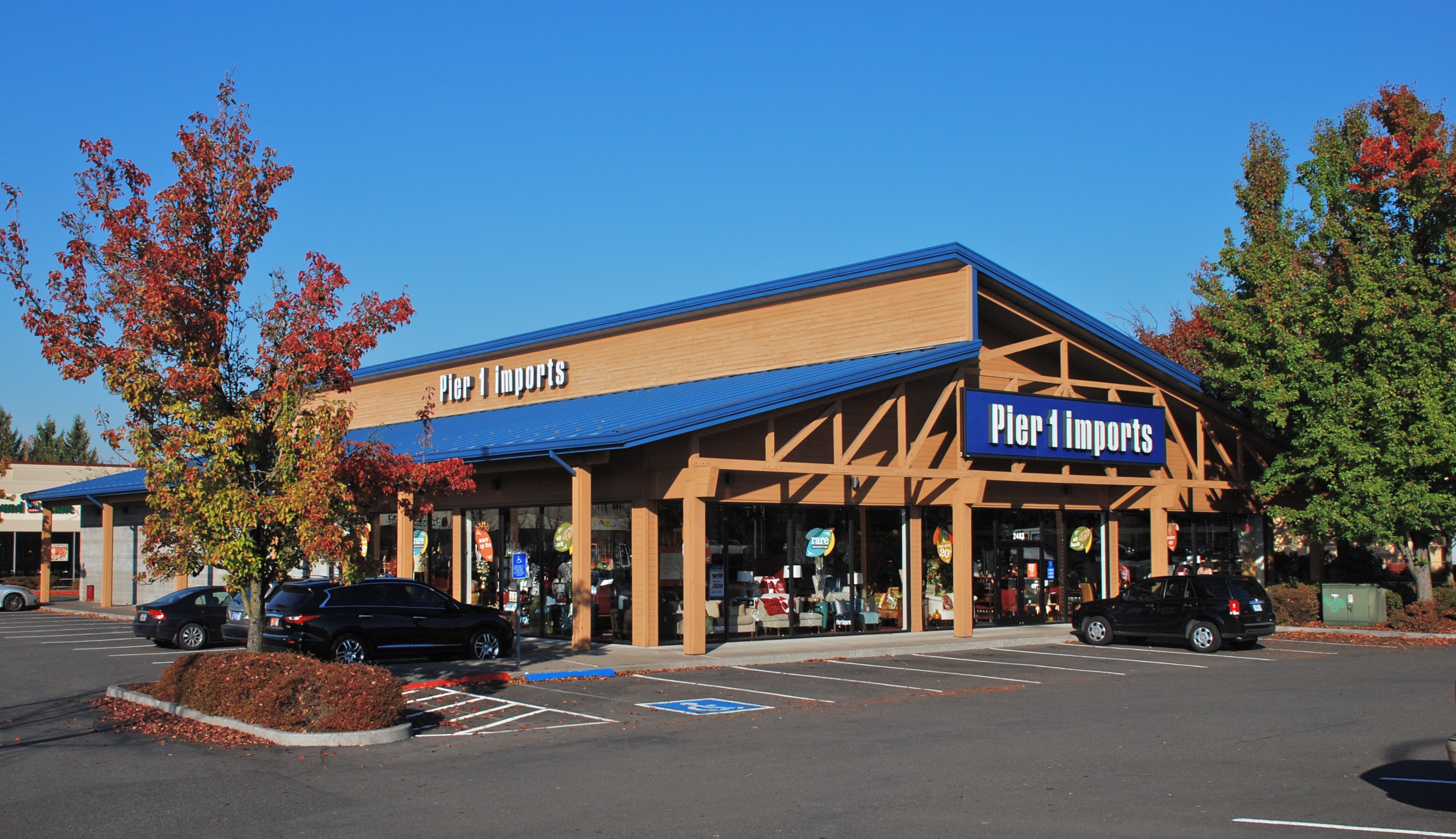
A Pier 1 Imports store in Oregon

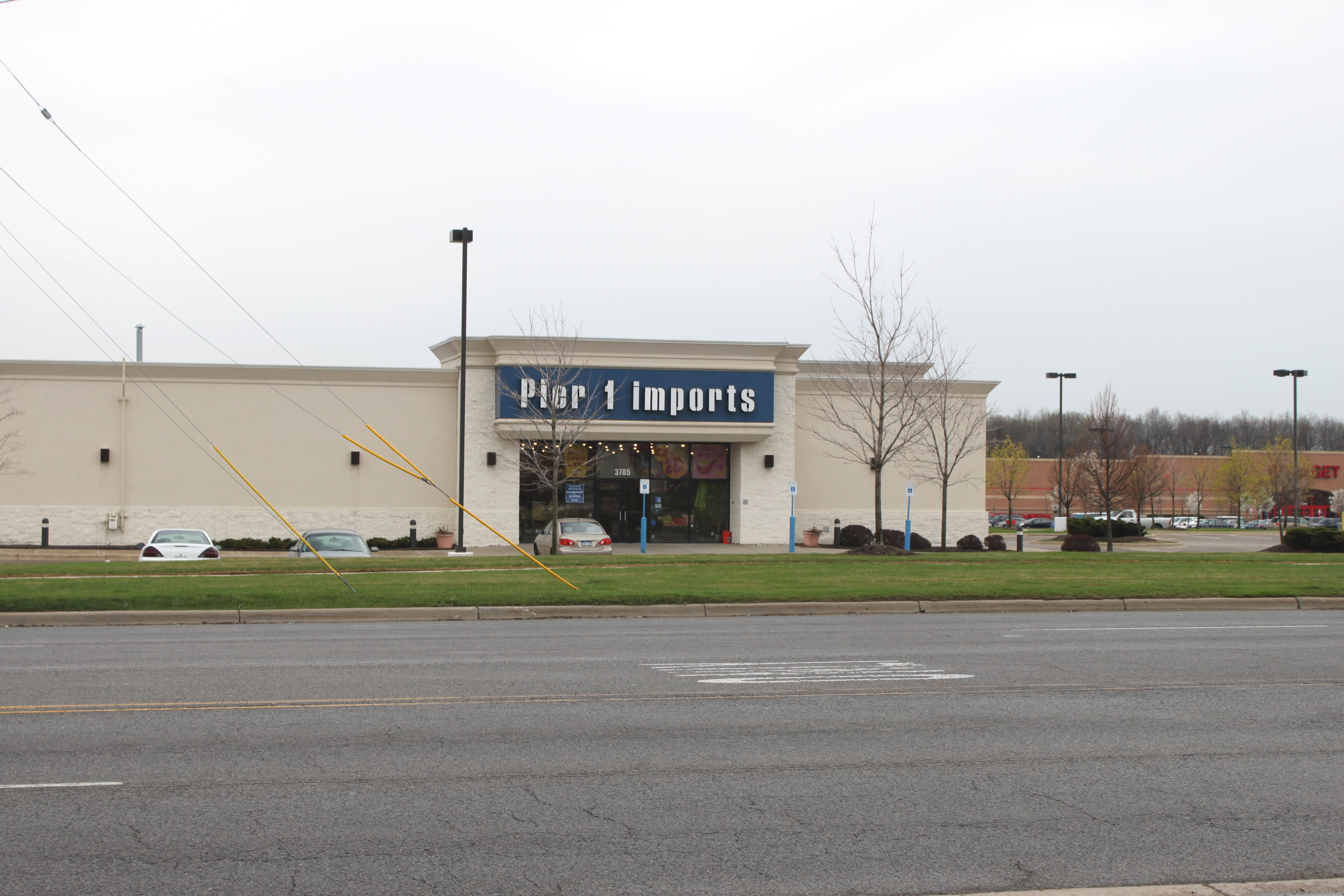
A Pier 1 Imports store, Pittsfield Township, Michigan. The store closed in 2015.

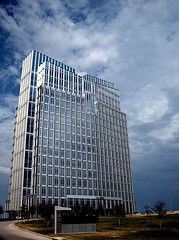
The Pier One headquarters building in Fort Worth, now under redevelopment as Fort Worth's City Hall with the first City Council meeting held on Tuesday, March 25, 2025.
