= Duesenberg Coupé Simone =

Fictional coupé luxury car

Duesenberg Coupé Simone is a fictional coupé luxury car allegedly branded by Duesenberg in the late 1930s. It first emerged in 1997, when the magazine Automobile ran a feature story about a unique "lost" Duesenberg car found in a barn, while admitting at the end that the car and the related backstory were made up. In 1998, a 1:24 scale model of the purported car was produced by The Franklin Mint, which was followed by a special edition model in 2008, called the Midnight Ghost. According to the backstory, the car was commissioned by the wealthy Frenchman Gui de LaRouche, who had named the car Simone after his mistress. The car was planned to debut at the 1939 New York World's Fair, but failed due to World War II and was eventually lost.

The Coupé Simone models became popular among collectors, despite bogus backstory. The relevant images and story were further disseminated in the internet.

== Backstory ==
The elaborate pseudohistorical backstory of Coupé Simone was conceived by Franklin Mint design directors Roger Hardnock and Raffi Minasian. According to it, two Franklin Mint designers were attending the mint's Antique Auto Show in 1995 when they were approached by a young man who said an elderly woman in his home town in Pennsylvania had an old car, parts, and tools in a barn. The woman had kept it all for decades "in the hope that her husband, lost in the war, would return". The two designers drove to the town to check. With permission from the elderly woman, they allegedly found drawings, letters and photographs in the barn, most yellowed and moisture-stained by age. The documents depicted a custom-made Duesenberg car with flowing aerodynamic lines evoking the Art Deco design by Figoni et Falaschi. The documents, claiming to originate from 1937 and 1938, alleged that the Frenchman Gui de LaRouche commissioned a custom-made Duesenberg car to be made by Emmett-Armand Coachworks. The purported coachworks owners, Emmett Hardnock and Armand Minasian, planned to show the car at the 1939 New York World's Fair which would last throughout World War II. Before the fair, de LaRouche demanded delivery of the car to France. Hardnock traveled by steamship to deliver the car and collect final payment, but before the ship docked, World War II had started. The documents were forgeries made by Roger Hardnock and Raffi Minasian through artificial aging of paper.

Minasian later recalled that the Coupé Simone model sold better than Franklin Mint's two previous real Duesenberg models. This was despite the erudition of the Franklin Mint car collectors, as none of them had heard of Coupé Simone before.
