= Tuesday Morning =

American discount closeout retailer

Tuesday Morning Corporation

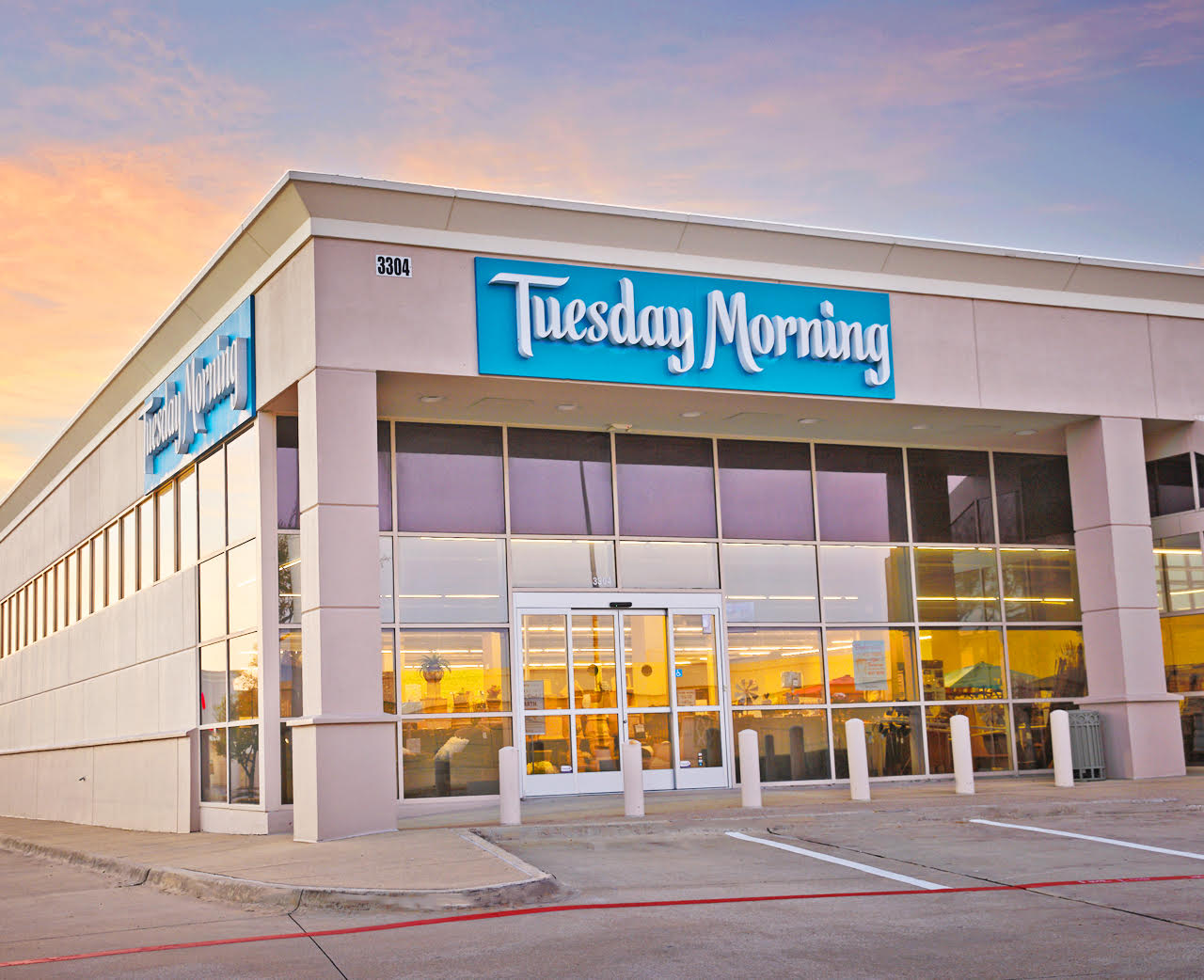
- A store in Plano, Texas (Dallas-Fort Worth area)
- Type: Public
- Traded as: Nasdaq: TUES (until 2020); Nasdaq: TUEM (2021–2023); Expert Market: TUEMQ (2023–present)
- Industry: Discount retail
- Founded: 1974; 52 years ago
- Founder: Lloyd Ross
- Fate: Chapter 11 bankruptcy and Liquidation, citing COVID-19 and the 2022 inflation as contributing factors
- Headquarters: Dallas, Texas, United States
- Number of locations: 0 stores (2023), E-commerce only
- Area served: United States
- Key people: Andrew Berger (CEO)
- Products: Gifts, housewares, food, flooring, books, toys, hardware, electronics, clothing, lawn and garden supplies, health and beauty products, sporting goods, pet supplies
- Brands: Various
- Revenue: ▲US$874.89 million (FY 2015)
- Number of employees: 7,500 (2020)
- Website: www.tuesdaymorning.com

Tuesday Morning Corporation is an American online household merchandise discount home goods store headquartered in Dallas, Texas. Founded in 1974, Tuesday Morning once had over 700 locations across the country and advertised itself as having high quality products at low prices.

Tuesday Morning closed all physical stores by July 2023 due to financial distress and bankruptcy. Since then, it has continued as an online retailer.

== History ==
Tuesday Morning was established in 1974 by Lloyd Ross. Ross worked with manufacturers to buy their excess merchandise and host limited-time warehouse sales to offer these goods at a discount to the public. Tuesday Morning moved to a pop-up retail location in 1979 with seasonal events.

Tuesday Morning went to full-time retail operations in 1979 and went public in 1984 with 57 stores. At its peak in 2018, Tuesday Morning operated over 700 locations and had sales of over $1 billion. Tuesday Morning focused on discount home goods.

In May 2020, following extended store closures due to the COVID-19 pandemic, Tuesday Morning filed for Chapter 11 bankruptcy reorganization and was delisted from the NASDAQ. During the reorganization process Tuesday Morning closed close to 200 unprofitable store locations and a distribution center. In December 2020, Tuesday Morning emerged from bankruptcy with a rights offering, enabling the ability to pay all vendor claims in full and protect shareholder value. Upon emerging, Tuesday Morning established a new executive leadership team who failed to live up to expectations and tanked the company’s stock from $4+ per share down to 30¢ per share in just over one year.

On May 25, 2021, Tuesday Morning was re-listed on the Nasdaq stock exchange under TUEM. In 2022, Tuesday Morning was acquired by Retail Ecommerce Ventures for $35 million.

On February 14, 2023, Tuesday Morning once again filed for Chapter 11 bankruptcy; Tuesday Morning then proceeded to close roughly half of all stores nationwide, including nearly all of its stores in California. On April 28, 2023, just days after the collapse of Bed Bath & Beyond, Tuesday Morning announced that it would be going out of business and close all 200 remaining locations by July 2023. All Tuesday Morning store locations officially closed and Tuesday Morning began an ecommerce presence in July 2023. However, on July 10, 2023, Tuesday Morning announced that the Chapter 11 case would be converted to a Chapter 7 liquidation effective July 27, 2023, and liquidate all remaining assets of Tuesday Morning. The e-commerce presence is expected to remain intact and continue operating during the process.

The company now operates solely online via its website, which remains active as of 2026.
