= The Franklin Mint =

Private mint in Pennsylvania

Franklin Mint
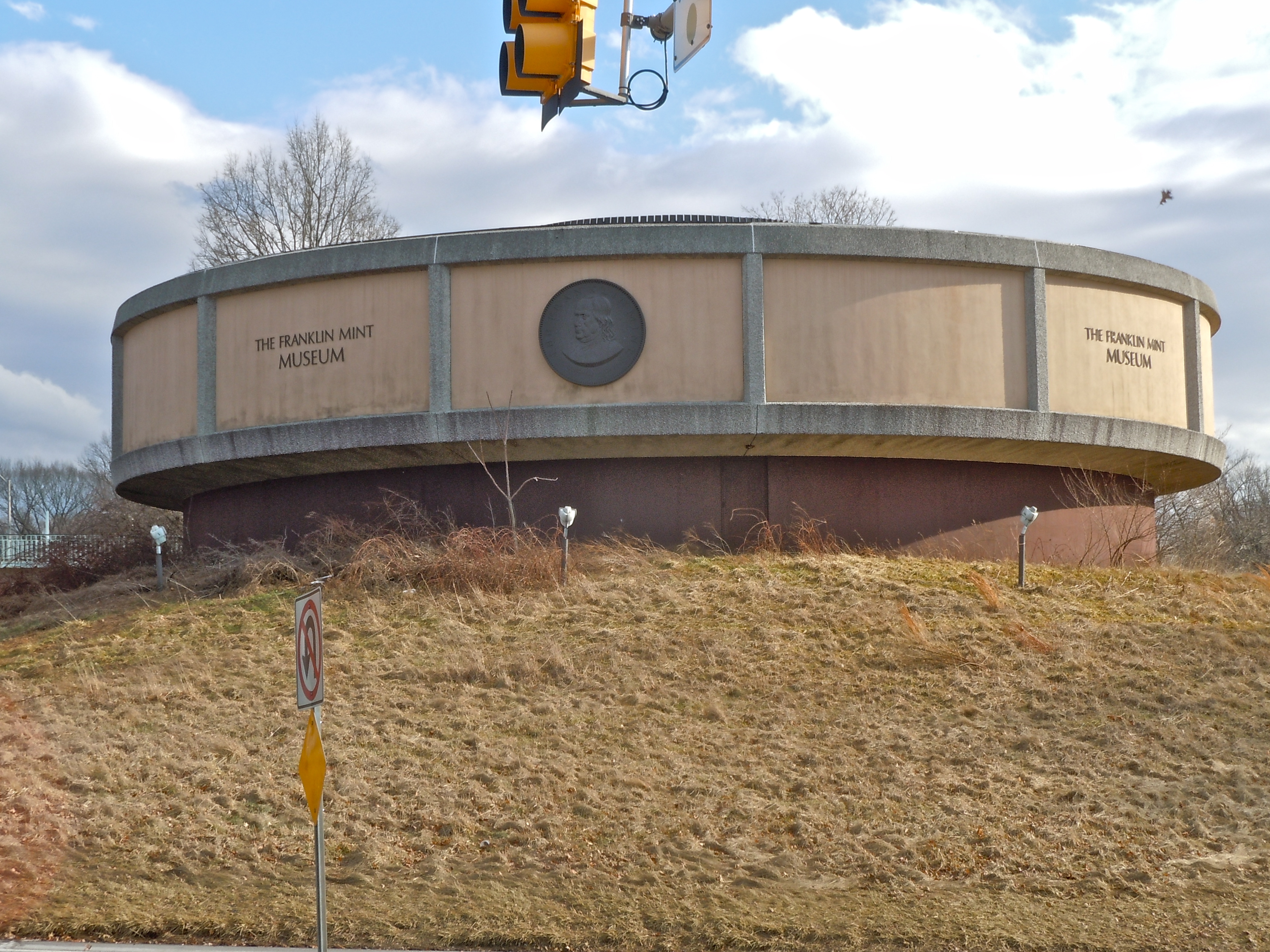
- The Franklin Mint Museum
- Type: Subsidiary
- Founded: 1964
- Founder: Joseph Segel
- Headquarters: Exton, Pennsylvania, U.S. New York City, U.S.
- Products: Collectibles
- Parent: Retail Ecommerce Ventures
- Website: franklinmint.com

The Franklin Mint is a private mint founded by Joseph Segel in 1964 in Wawa, Pennsylvania. The building is in Middletown Township.

The brand name was previously owned by Sequential Brands Group headquartered in New York City. It is currently owned by Retail Ecommerce Ventures (REV). The Franklin Mint sells coins, medals, jewelry, die-cast vehicles, dolls, sculpture and other collectibles.

== History ==
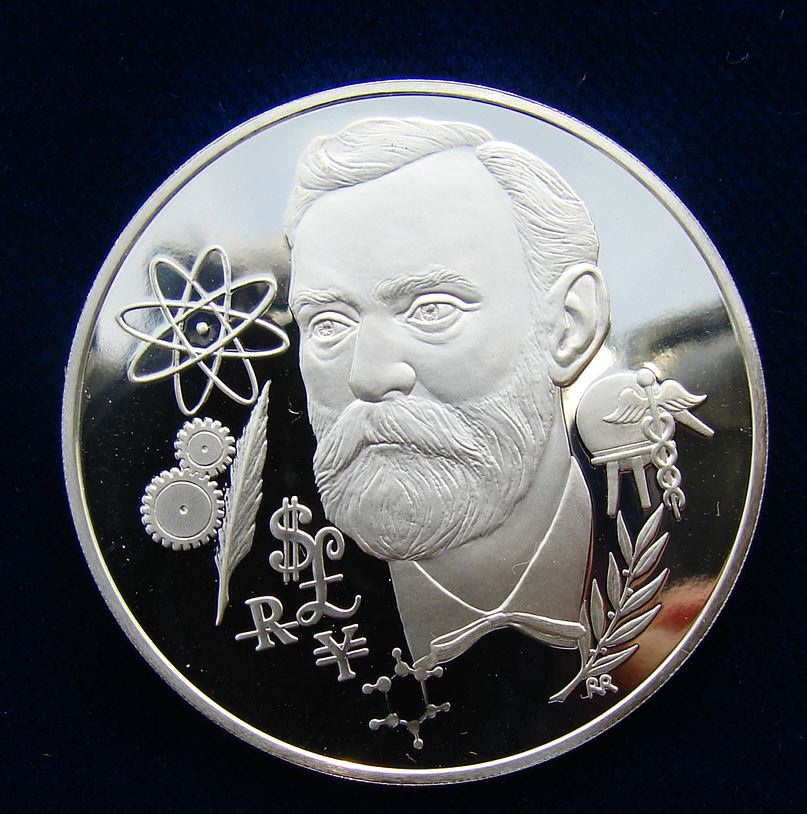
Medal honoring the presentation of Nobel Prizes, December 10, 1975

For five decades, The Franklin Mint produced and mass-marketed collectibles. Its product line began with manufacturing and marketing privately minted gold and silver commemorative rounds and medallions.

== The Franklin Library ==
The Franklin Library produced public domain classic books from its founding in 1973 until its closing in 2000. Its books were designed and bound by The Sloves Organization, Ltd. The Franklin Library published several book series, including The Great Books of the Western World and The Hundred Greatest Books of All Time.

== Vehicle models ==
In 1983, after Warner Communications had purchased The Franklin Mint, the company entered the diecast vehicle market, starting with the 1935 Mercedes Benz 500K Roadster. Usually the cars were labeled as Franklin Mint Precision Models. In the following years, Franklin Mint produced more than 600 different issues of motorcycles, trucks, and tractors besides automobiles. In 1998, the mint started producing models of Duesenberg Coupé Simone, a fictitious luxury car allegedly made by Duesenberg in the late 1930s.

Additionally The Franklin Mint began manufacturing diecast aircraft. They produced a large number of World War II 1:48 scale planes including the B-17 Flying Fortress, PBY Catalina, P-51 Mustang, and Focke-Wulf Fw 190.

== Diana, Princess of Wales Memorial Fund vs Franklin Mint ==
Following the death of Diana, Princess of Wales, the Diana, Princess of Wales Memorial Fund was granted intellectual property rights over her image. In 1998, after refusing the Franklin Mint an official license to produce Diana merchandise, the Memorial Fund sued the company, accusing it of illegally selling Diana dolls, plates and jewelry. In California, where the initial case was tried, a suit to preserve the right of publicity may be filed on behalf of a dead person, but only if that person is a Californian. The Memorial Fund therefore filed the lawsuit on behalf of the estate, and upon losing the case, was countersued by Franklin Mint in 2003. In November 2004, the case was settled out of court with the Memorial Fund agreeing to pay £13.5 million to charitable causes on which both sides agreed. In addition to this, the Memorial Fund spent a total of close to £4 million in costs and fees relating to this litigation, and as a result froze grants allocated to a number of charities.
