= Modell's Sporting Goods =

US sporting goods retailer

Modell's Sporting Goods Online, Inc.
- Type: Private
- Industry: Retail
- Founded: 1889 (137 years ago) in New York City, New York, U.S.
- Founder: Morris Modell
- Defunct: August 30, 2020 (physical stores)
- Fate: Chapter 11 bankruptcy liquidation
- Products: Sports apparel, sporting goods, footwear, licensed goods
- Brands: Majestic Athletic, Nike, Reebok, etc.
- Services: Sporting apparel, licensed sports gear of the MLB, NHL, NBA, and NFL
- Owner: Omni Retail Enterprises
- Website: modells.com

Modell's Sporting Goods Online, Inc., is an American online sporting goods and related apparel retailer. Modell's began with operating retail stores between the late 1880s and the late 2010s. In 2020, Modell's became a brand owned by the private-equity firm Retail Ecommerce Ventures.

== History ==
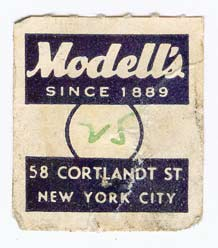
Vintage Modell's tag from the original store in New York City before it specialized exclusively in sporting goods

The chain was founded as a single store by Morris A. Modell in 1889 in the Manhattan borough of New York City, making it possibly the third-oldest sporting goods store in North America (after James F. Brine's in Massachusetts and Milwaukee's Burghardt Sporting Goods).

Modell, a Jewish immigrant from Hungary, opened the first location on Cortlandt Street in Lower Manhattan. (The Modell pawn shop chain in Manhattan and Brooklyn was founded by Morris's brother George in 1893 as a spinoff. The two companies operate separately.)

Through the years, it remained a family-owned business, passing through four generations of the Modell family. While best known as a sporting-goods retailer, Modell's also operated a chain of "full-line" discount retailers in the New York City-metropolitan area known as "Modell's Shopper's World" (and for a short time as "White-Modells") from the mid-1950s up until 1989, when the company decided to focus on its sporting-goods operations partly due to increased competition in the discount retail market.

William Modell, who became chairman in 1985, also founded the Crohn's & Colitis Foundation along with his wife, Shelby Modell.

Modell's at one time operated 152 stores, mainly in New York, New Jersey, and Pennsylvania, in addition to also having a presence Delaware, Maryland, Virginia, the District of Columbia, Connecticut, Massachusetts, and New Hampshire. It operated a flagship store which was located at 243 West 42nd Street near Times Square in Manhattan.

Mitchell Modell, the company's chief executive officer, was featured on an episode of the television series Undercover Boss that aired on November 2, 2012, in which he went in disguise into his own stores to see things from an employee point of view. Two years later, he was accused in a February 2014 lawsuit by rival Dick's Sporting Goods of entering a Dick's store in disguise to gain access to its retail secrets. The lawsuit was settled out of court on undisclosed terms by April. Independent retail analysts and attorneys suggested that Modell visited the store on a whim, rather than as part of some plot to steal information.

In February 2020, the company announced that it would close 24 underperforming stores in an effort to stave off bankruptcy. The company also announced that it had hired financial advisers following a disappointing 2019 holiday season. The company also stopped paying an unspecified number of landlords and some of its vendors and had started discussions with suppliers in another effort to prevent losing any further cash. Unfortunately it was not enough to save the company, and on March 11 2020, Modell's Sporting Goods filed for Chapter 11 bankruptcy protection, and announced it would permanently close all of its remaining stores. Liquidation sales were disrupted due to the COVID-19 pandemic, forcing all brick-and-mortar stores to temporarily close. Once Modell's locations began reopening, liquidation sales continued and all stores were closed by the end of August 2020.

On August 20, 2020, all of the company's assets were acquired by Retail Ecommerce Ventures for $3.6 million, and it announced that the company would be coming back as a digital-only brand. In March 2023, Retail Ecommerce Ventures announced that it would be exploring options in an effort to save itself, including a potential Chapter 11 bankruptcy filing, which would mark Modell's second bankruptcy in three years. The company had also hired restructuring lawyers in an effort to stave off bankruptcy. Although the company is closed, it remains a notable part of American retail history due to its long legacy of serving sports enthusiasts for more than 130 years.

== Local sports affiliations ==
Some writers attributed at least some of Modell's problems during the 2010s due to the poor performance of New York sports teams in that decade, and the difficulty in selling the team-related merchandise.

Art Modell, who owned the NFL football teams the Cleveland Browns and later the Baltimore Ravens, was the grandson of the founder of Modell's Sporting Goods, Morris A. Modell, but had nothing to do with that company. A perceived affiliation was hoped to be useful when Modell Sporting Goods attempted to penetrate Maryland markets in 2004 – a spokesman stated, "I think that Art Modell having brought a team to Baltimore that won a Super Bowl championship can help in some ways" – but the expansion was ultimately not successful.
