= 11 Honoré =

American online clothing retailer

- Industry: Fashion e-tail
- Founded: 2017; 8 years ago
- Founder: Patrick Herning; Kathryn Retzer
- Defunct: 2022
- Fate: Acquired by Dia & Co
- Headquarters: Los Angeles, California, United States

11 Honoré is an American plus-sized fashion e-retailer based in Los Angeles, California The company sells clothing from designers and brands including Zac Posen, Prabal Gurung, Jason Wu, and Christian Siriano.

== History ==
The company was co-founded in 2017 by Patrick Herning and Kathryn Retzer, with investments from Forerunner, Nordstrom, Upfront, Greycroft and Canvas. It sold 15 brands at launch, and expanded to almost 90 within two years.

In 2019, 11 Honoré held a size-inclusive runway event at New York Fashion Week featuring multiple designers, headlined by actress Laverne Cox and plus-sized models including Candice Huffine, Marquita Pring, Precious Lee, Stella Duval and Tara Lynn.

In 2020 the company launched its private label, initially featuring 24 pieces.

In October 2021, 11 Honoré began selling in Nordstrom stores, and on the retailer's website.
