= Edward Enninful =

Ghanaian-born English editor and stylist (born 1972)

Edward Enninful OBE
- Born: Edward Kobina Enninful; 22 February 1972 (age 54); Takoradi, Ghana
- Education: Goldsmiths, University of London (dropped out)
- Occupation: Creative director
- Spouse: Alec Maxwell (m. 2022)

Edward Kobina Enninful (born 22 February 1972) is a Ghanaian-born British editor and stylist who was editor-in-chief of British Vogue and European editorial director of Condé Nast.

He was appointed fashion director of the British fashion magazine i-D at the age of 18, a position he held for more than two decades. He was subsequently contributing fashion editor at Vogue Italia and American Vogue, as well as creative fashion director at W magazine. Enninful was appointed editor-in-chief of British Vogue in 2017 and in 2023 was promoted to the position of global advisor to the international Vogues. As of 2025 he is the founder and Chief Creative Officer of EE72, a global entertainment and media company.

Marga Weimans at De Wereld Draait Door in 2017 over Edward Enninful.

== Early life ==
Edward Enninful was born in Ghana on 22 February 1972. He was the fifth of six children born to Ghana Army officer Major Crosby Enninful. In 1985, after a coup d'état which deposed President Ignatius Kutu Acheampong, Enninful's family emigrated to England, settling down in the London neighbourhood of Ladbroke Grove. His mother worked as a seamstress, and she inspired him with the vividly patterned colours and fabrics she used while creating clothing for her British-Ghanaian friends.

At the age of 16, Enninful was spotted on a train by stylist Simon Foxton. A few weeks later, he was shooting with Foxton at his house, along with Nick Knight, the cofounder and photographer of bimonthly magazine i-D. By the age of 17, he had been introduced to Terry Jones, another cofounder of i-D, and soon began assisting the magazine's fashion director Beth Summers. Enninful dropped out after three months of studies at Goldsmiths, University of London, while juggling his modeling career and assisting on shoots with Foxton and Summers. Summers left the magazine a few weeks after Enninful's 18th birthday, and Terry Jones gave Enninful the position.

== Career ==
=== i-D magazine ===
At the age of 18, Enninful's position as fashion director at i-D made him the youngest-ever fashion director for an international publication. He quickly became known for his edgy elegance, which ultimately became his trademark. Much of his inspiration came from the streets: "We British have to customize our clothes, we have to be more creative, informing who you are—and I am still obsessed with the streets."

For the March 2009 issue of i-D Magazine, Enninful styled "The Best British" cover story by photographer Sølve Sundsbø. The issue printed 12 separate covers, each featuring one of twelve British supermodels, including Jourdan Dunn, Kate Moss, Susie Bick, Naomi Campbell, Stella Tennant, Eliza Cummings, Alice Dellal, Daisy Lowe, Twiggy, Yasmin Le Bon, Lily Donaldson, and Agyness Deyn.

=== Italian Vogue ===
In 1998, Enninful became a contributing editor to Italian Vogue. According to Enninful, working with Vogue Italia editor-in-chief Franca Sozzani and photographer Steven Meisel helped him to mature as a stylist. "I always say that I was a London stylist but when I worked with Steven, I became a proper stylist."

Among his achievements at Italian Vogue, one notable project that Enninful spearheaded was the production of its "Black Issue". The "Black Issue" featured only black models, including Naomi Campbell, Jourdan Dunn and Alek Wek to showcase and celebrate black models and black women in the worlds of art, politics and entertainment. He described his intention as ending the "white-out that dominates the catwalks and magazines". The issue was so successful that it sold out in the U.S. and U.K. within 72 hours, leading Condé Nast to print an additional 40,000 copies.

Enninful also styled the magazine's June 2011 cover editorial, "Belle Vere", which exclusively featured plus-sized models including Tara Lynn, Candice Huffine, and Robyn Lawley.

=== American Vogue ===
In 2006, Enninful became contributing fashion editor for American Vogue. He can be seen in the documentary "The September Issue".

=== W magazine ===
In 2011, Enninful became the style director at W, a high-end Condé Nast title that had struggled in the late 2000s.
Under Enninful's direction, W generated considerable attention for its editorials, including the March 2012 cover shot by Steven Klein featuring Kate Moss depicted as a nun as well as another cover featuring singer Nicki Minaj as an 18th-century French courtesan. For the magazine's November 2011 art issue, Enninful collaborated with Steven Meisel on a series of fake advertisements that ran throughout the magazine, including one that featured a drag queen contestant from RuPaul's Drag Race named Carmen Carrera advertising a fictitious fragrance called La Femme.

Under Enninful's direction, W began to recover. The magazine's ad pages went up 16.7 percent in the year to May 2012, from 388 to 453 pages, according to Media Industry Newsletter—the biggest year-on-year gain among fashion titles. Editorial Director Stefano Tonchi told The New York Times that Enninful was a big part of that success.

=== British Vogue ===
Enninful was confirmed as the new editor-in-chief of British Vogue on 10 April 2017, making him the first black editor-in-chief of the magazine. Condé Nast International chairman and chief executive Jonathan Newhouse announced him as the successor to Alexandra Shulman, calling Enninful "an influential figure in the communities of fashion, Hollywood and music which shape the cultural zeitgeist", adding that "by virtue of his talent and experience, Edward is supremely prepared to assume the responsibility of British Vogue".

Since Enninful took the creative reins, he has reshaped a century-old publication and into a contemporary fashion platform that is more reflective of the current global audience. His efforts have led to a 51 percent increase in digital traffic since 2017 and attracted 140 new advertisers. While other publications, including American Vogue, reduced frequency during the 2020 pandemic, British Vogue remained financially stable and continued to produce 12 issues.

For his first issue, Enninful made a bold statement of what the "New Vogue" would be like by featuring British mixed-race model and feminist activist Adwoa Aboah as the cover star. Covers since have featured the likes of Beyoncé, Oprah Winfrey, Rihanna, Judi Dench (at 85, British Vogue's oldest cover star), Madonna and soccer player Marcus Rashford. The September 2019 edition, which was guest-edited by Meghan, Duchess of Sussex, featured on the cover 15 female changemakers, including Greta Thunberg and Jane Fonda. The issue was a quick sell-out and, according to estimates provided by Condé Nast Britain, the release of the September cover in the first 24 hours alone, generated more than double the entire PR value of Enninful's previous successful September issue, featuring pop star Rihanna.

Under Enninful, British Vogue has moved into political territory. In response to comments on immigrants in the United States by President Donald Trump, Enninful created the moving video project I Am An Immigrant, gathering huge names from the worlds of fashion, music, and film to show the vital creative input of people who are immigrants in the US.

For the September 2020 issue, Enninful commissioned Misan Harriman, the first Black male photographer to shoot a British Vogue cover in its 104-year history. Enninful later enlisted Kennedi Carter, who became the youngest photographer in British Vogue's history to shoot a cover story for the magazine.

Under Enninful's leadership, the British Vogue staff became 25 percent people of color. He also initiated outreach programs with local schools to recruit digital media students and increase demographic diversity at the publication.

=== Advertising ===
Along with his editorial work, Enninful has helped to shape the vision of numerous advertising campaigns and runway shows for many influential international fashion houses. To date, he has consulted for Comme des Garçons, Christian Dior, Dolce and Gabbana, Celine, Lanvin, Mulberry, Giorgio Armani, Valentino, Jil Sander, Calvin Klein, Fendi, Alessandro Dell'Acqua, Gucci, Hugo Boss and Missoni, among others.

To celebrate the 25th anniversary of Enninful's career, he collaborated with Beats by Dre and Nick Knight (photographer) to create a limited-edition line of headphones with an accompanying video entitled The Seven Deadly Sins of Edward Enninful. The film featured eight supermodels – Kate Moss (lust), Naomi Campbell (pride), Karlie Kloss (greed), Lara Stone and Anna Ewers (gluttony), Maria Carla Boscono (sloth), Karen Elson (wrath) and Jourdan Dunn (envy) and screened on the Beats by Dre billboard in Times Square in 2016.

In 2017, Enninful made his directorial debut in a collaboration with the American brand GAP to celebrate diversity. Enninful enlisted a diverse cast spanning many industries, including Wiz Khalifa, Priyanka Chopra, Adwoa Aboah, Maria Borges, Christie Brinkley, Miles Chamley-Watson, Jonathan Groff and Alek Wek, and featured the stars singing along to "Sunny" by Boney M. According to GAP the goal of the video, titled "Bridging the Gap", was "to show unity and individuality existing in tandem".

== Personal life ==
On 22 February 2022, his 50th birthday, Enninful married his long-term partner Alec Maxwell at Longleat House in Wiltshire.

Enninful's memoir, A Visible Man, was published in September 2022. It was "Book of the Week" on BBC Radio 4, read by the author.

== Recognition ==
- The Black Alumni of Pratt's Celebration of the Creative Spirit Award (2012)
- National Magazine Feature Photography Award 2013: "Good Kate, Bad Kate" by Steven Klein (2013)
- The New York Urban League's Frederick Douglass Medallion Award (2014)
- BRAG Business Achievement Award (2014)
- British Fashion Awards: Isabella Blow Award for Fashion Creator (2014)
- Clio Excellence in Commercial Styling Award (2015)
- Appointed Order of the British Empire for services to diversity in the fashion industry (2016)
- Attitude magazine’s Man of the Year (2018)
- AMFAR Courage Award (2018)
- CFDA Media Award (2018)
- Daily Front Row Magazine of the Year (2019)
- BOF Global Voices Award (2019)
- Named the sixth most powerful black man in Britain in the Powerlist 2020 ranking, having made the Top 10 in both 2018 and 2019.
- PPA Editor of the Year (2020)
- PPA Diversity Initiative of the Year (2020)
- Fashion Awards' Services to Diversity (2020)
- BSME (British Society of Magazine Editors) – Editor's Editor Award (2020)
- The British Fashion Awards 2020 Changemakers Award
- Named the fifth on the 2021 15th edition of the Powerlist rankings, after reaching the Top 10 for four years running
- BSME (British Society of Magazine Editors) 2021 for Editor of the Year
- The British Fashion Awards for Leader of Change (2021)
- The Prince's Trust Global Ambassador (2021)
- British LGBT Awards: Global Media Trailblazer (2022)
- The CNMI Sustainable Fashion Awards: The Visionary Award (2023)

Media offices
Preceded by Alexandra Shulman	Editor of British Vogue; 2017–present	Succeeded by Incumbent
