= Chenese Lewis =

American actress, host, and model

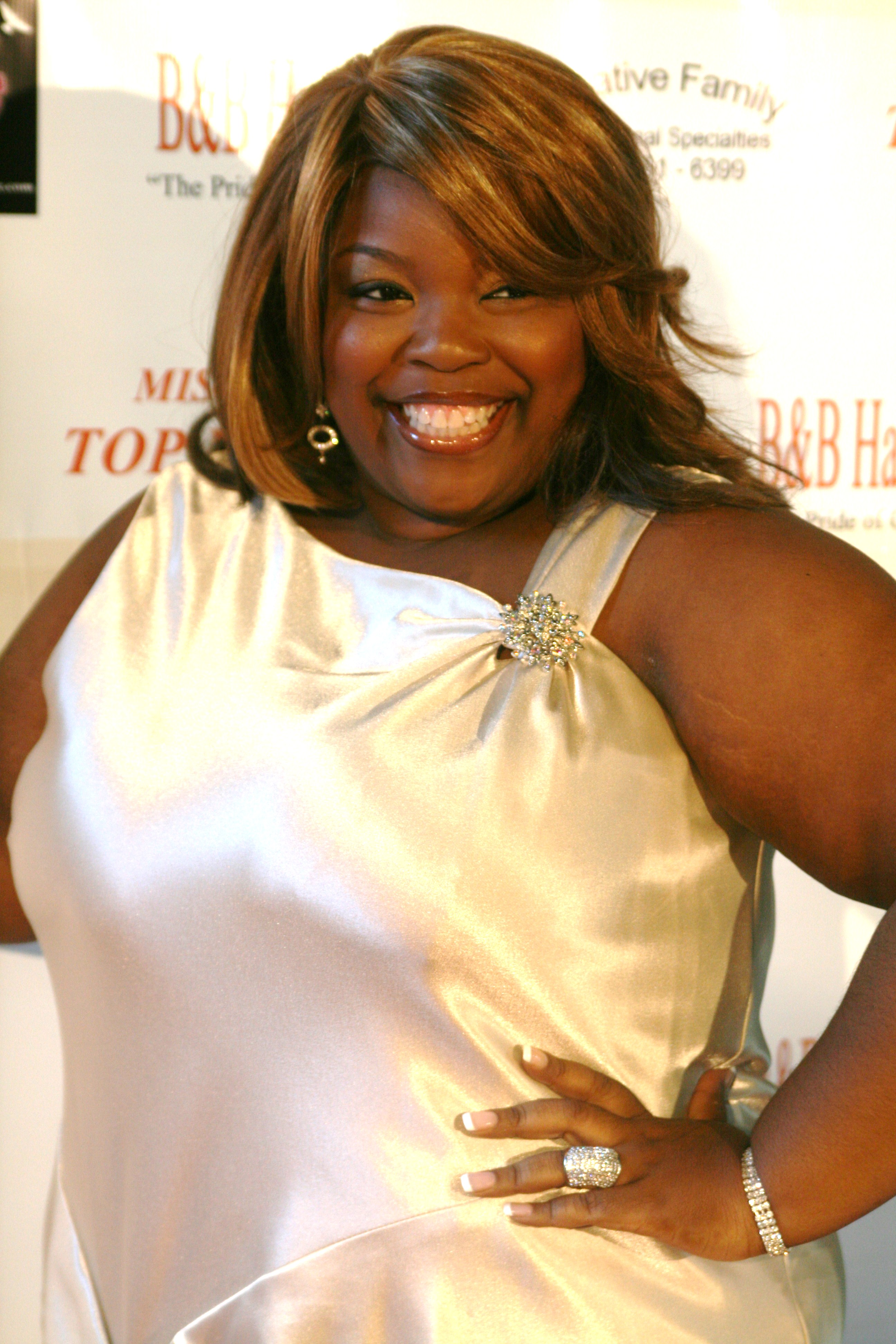
- Chenese Lewis at red carpet event in Hollywood
- Born: Chenese Tharis Lewis; November 14, 1979 (age 47); Baton Rouge, Louisiana, United States
- Occupations: Actress, Host, Plus-Size Model
- Years active: 2000 - present
- Website: http://www.cheneselewis.com

Chenese Tharis Lewis, born November 14, 1979, in Baton Rouge, Louisiana, is an American actress, host, plus-size model, and a positive body image and self-esteem advocate. Dubbed “One Of The Original Plus-Size Influencers” by Forbes, she made history by being the first crowned Miss Plus America in 2003 and created the first podcast for the plus size industry, The Chenese Lewis Show, in 2008. Lewis, also an actress, appeared on the first season of the hit BET series, Hell Date.

== Biography ==
She is the only child of Willie D. Lewis and Tharis Lewis. Chenese attended McKinley Senior High School and Louisiana State University.

== Career ==
Lewis's career began in pageantry in 2002 when she stumbled upon a plus size beauty pageant on the Internet and entered as Miss Louisiana Plus America. Without any prior pageant experience or formal training she walked away with the national title of Miss Plus America.

She moved to Los Angeles in 2004 to pursue a career in entertainment. She is best known for her role on the BET television series Hell Date. She appeared on four episodes, one where she was the lead as “The Gorgeous Queen Diva Supreme” where she played an overly confident dater. She has also made several television appearances as herself on shows such The Insider and The Cho Show and as an expert commentator on Dr. Phil.

Lewis has modeled for Torrid, served as a spokesperson for Ashley Stewart, appeared in the movie Phat Girlz as a Thick Madame Magazine Model, and appeared on the December 2007 cover of PLUS Model Magazine which coined her "A leader in the curvy revolution!”. In December 2012 she appeared on the cover of the UK anniversary issue of VICE Magazine. Chenese is currently the face of Aida Cosmetics’ “Confidence and Glamour” campaign.

Lewis is a former President of Hollywood NOW National Organization for Women and also served as the Love Your Body Committee Chairperson for the local chapter. She created and produced a local event for Hollywood NOW to celebrate Love Your Body Day. Her 2010 Love Your Body Campaign, where she posed nude with America's Next Top Model, Whitney Thompson, garnered international media attention and magnified her role as a leading positive body image advocate.

== Recognition ==
In 2014 Lewis was named by Ebony.com as one of the top "6 Plus Fashion Power Players On The Rise”. In 2015 Bustle.com listed Lewis as one of the "7 Plus Size Fashion Pioneers Who Were Ahead Of Their Time".

== Filmography ==
Film and Television
Year	Title	Role	Notes
2007	Hell Date	Herself	4 Episodes
2008	The Cho Show	Celebrity Judge	Episode: Cho-Universe Pageant
2012	Noobz	Milkshake	
