= Thigh gap =

Space between the inner thighs when standing upright with both knees touching

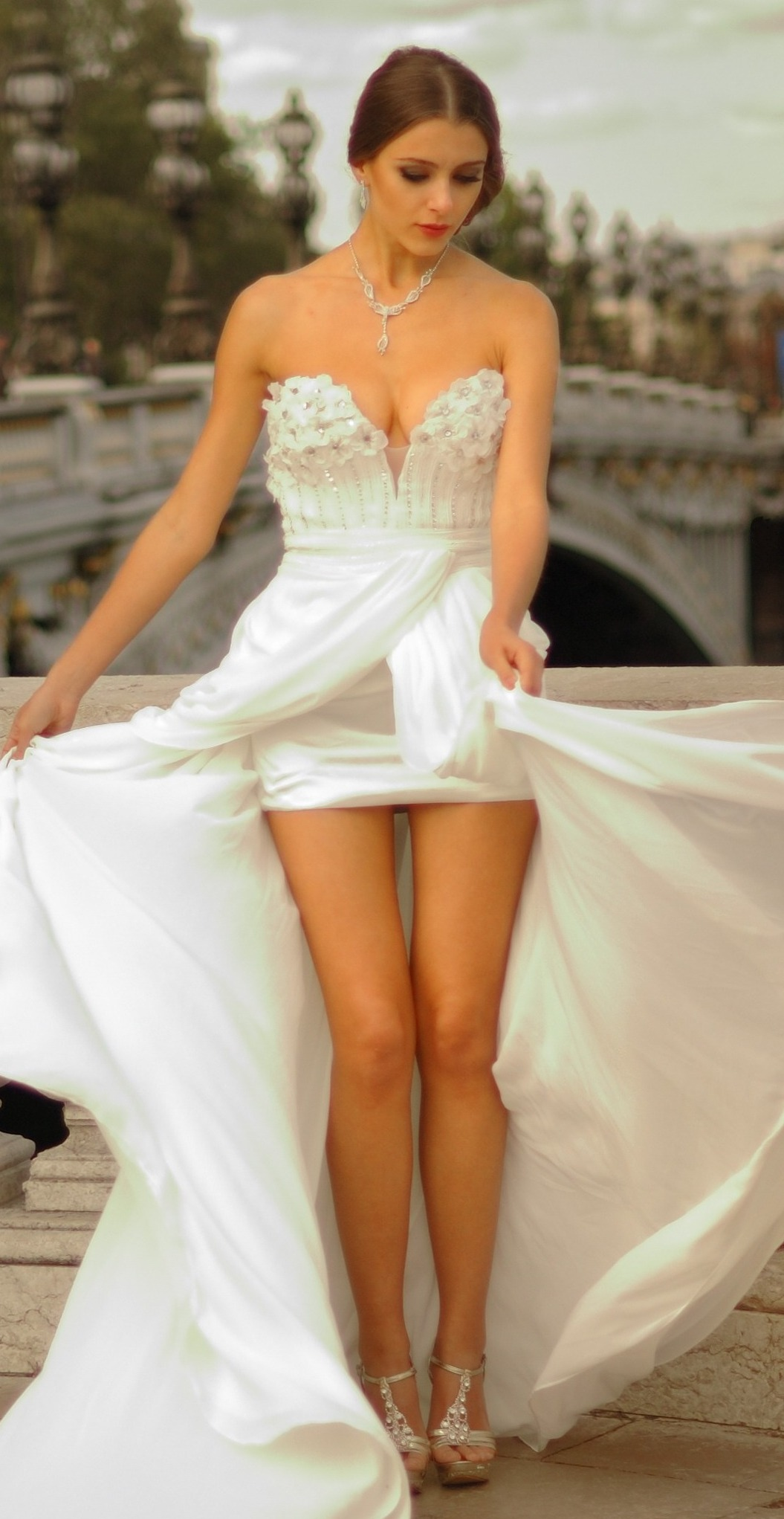
A woman with a thigh gap

A thigh gap is a space between the inner thighs of some women when standing upright with knees touching.

In the 21st century, some people in the West have begun to consider the thigh gap a special feature of physical attractiveness and physical fitness in women.

In the United States, it was reported that among teenage girls, a gap had become a beauty ideal. Many women have found it difficult to achieve a thigh gap, leading some to resort to extreme dieting or surgery in order to try to obtain it. Critics of the phenomenon have held that the thigh gap is a physical feature natural only for women with a certain type of body shape and bone structure that most women do not have. An AFP article cites several American psychologists and sociologists, one a body image expert, who opine that attempts to attain what they deem an unattainable ideal come at the cost of problems of self-esteem that can lead to eating disorders.

== Origin of the phenomenon ==
The thigh gap first received widespread news coverage in December 2012 after the Victoria's Secret Fashion Show which featured several models with noticeable thigh gaps. Images of thigh gaps featured in "thinspiration" blogs and across social networking sites.

== Backlash ==
In 2013, author Camille Hugh published her book The Thigh Gap Hack, and in June 2013 she was interviewed about the book on The Dr. Oz Show. The book was criticized by Lisa Delaney of Spryliving.com, who said the book "feeds girls' and women's obsessions with their bodies, promotes thinness at the expense of healthfulness (because of Hugh's disdain of fitness, exercise, muscles, etc.), and promotes flaky, unproven methods for weight/fat loss."

A backlash quickly developed among those concerned about the potential negative consequences of the trend. Parenting experts and counselors formed anti-thigh gap movements. The medical community and female-empowerment advocates have also commented critically on the subject, and the U.S. National Eating Disorders Association launched a website to promote healthy body image and attitudes to food and weight.

Australian plus-size model Robyn Lawley criticized the thigh gap trend, denouncing it as "just another tool of manipulation that other people are trying to use to keep me from loving my body". Target Corporation apologized after Cassey Ho discovered that a photo of a model had a photoshopped thigh gap for a girl's bathing suit ad. Old Navy came under criticism by bloggers after a photo of a mannequin wearing women's plus-size jeans on their website appeared to have a small thigh gap placed so that the jeans on the mannequin would look thinner than they would look on an actual person. Old Navy subsequently stated that they do not use any photo-editing techniques to alter the apparent shape of their products, but they do sometimes use pins on clothing to adjust how it fits a mannequin.

== Media comment ==
The thigh gap has also spawned opinions from newspapers. The Times of India called it "mania". Columnist Kelly Richardson of the Sacramento Bee wrote that "for most people it is next to impossible to attain". In The Observer journalist Rosie Swash called the thigh gap "widespread, harmful and often unachievable". Columnist Hadley Freeman called it the "most extreme body fixation yet". Geneticist Sylvia Pagán Westphal was inspired to write an opinion piece on the thigh gap after her daughter brought the trend to her attention and was appalled by the results of her Google search for the term. San Jose State University sociologist Natalie Boero has attributed the trend to living in a "sexist and sizeist culture" and clinical psychologist Barbara Greenberg has dismissed the trend as a "pipe dream", adding "most women are not built that way to have that space between their thighs".

== Upper thigh gap and full thigh gap ==
In the classical sense, thigh gap refers to a space that spans the whole inner thighs (from the upper end to knees). Albeit less often, the name can also be used to refer to an upper gap, the small "triangle" or "heart" shaped gap that forms on the upper part of the inner thighs of some women when they are in the same pose that would make a traditional thigh gap visible.

== See also ==
- Body dysmorphic disorder – Mental disorder
- Media depictions of body shape
- Peer pressure – Influencing peers to conform
