= Linda Arroz =

American model, editor

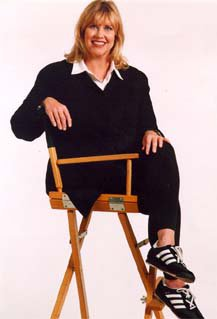
- Linda Arroz in 1998
- Born: November 26, 1954 (age 71); Flint, Michigan, United States
- Occupations: Plus-size model, magazine editor, spokesmodel
- Years active: 1989–present

Linda Arroz is a speaker, author, and former spokesperson, plus-size model, stylist and magazine editor, originally from Flint, Michigan. She was one of the first plus-size models to get a contract with a major brand.

== Career ==
Arroz began her career in 1979 in Flint, Michigan, working at Chevrolet’s V8 Engine Plant as an assembly line worker. When she was laid off, she moved to Oklahoma to work at the General Motors Oklahoma City Assembly Plant. She then attended the University of Oklahoma.

Arroz worked as an image and career consultant until 1989, when she was discovered by two representatives for the Spiegel catalog, which had just launched a plus-size division. She signed a three-year contract as a spokesmodel for For You from Spiegel, making her one of the first plus-size models to get a contract with a major brand. As a spokesmodel, she began making appearances on television and in public.

When her contract ended in 1991, Arroz was hired as the fashion editor for Big Beautiful Woman magazine, which was one of several mainstream titles owned by Larry Flynt's publishing company and was one of the first magazines to focus on plus-size style. In 1993, she was at the helm of two fashion magazines when she became editor-in-chief at Maternity Fashion & Beauty magazine. In 1995, she appeared on the cover of Big Beautiful Woman.

Since then, she has made numerous television appearances and has been a spokesperson for the fashion industry, promoting self-esteem, body confidence, and media technology. She has been quoted as a fashion stylist in such publications as The New York Times, Market Watch, and Forbes.com has made appearances on Good Morning America, FashionTelevision, Entertainment Tonight, and Leeza; and has appeared as a guest on Men Are from Mars, Women Are from Venus; Good Day L.A.; Richard Simmons' DreamMaker and Caryl & Marilyn: Real Friends. In 1994, she played herself in a cameo appearance on the soap opera The Bold and the Beautiful. In 2019, Arroz appeared in the feature film Before You Know It, directed by Hannah Pearl Utt and featuring Jen Tullock, Mandy Patinkin, Judith Light, and Alec Baldwin.

As marketing director and spokesperson for fashion designer Carole Little, Arroz represented the brand’s plus-size collection on the Home Shopping Network and Q2, a former division of QVC. From 1998 to 2001, she was the editor and a columnist at Real Size, an early adopter in the nascent realm of hybrid publications incorporating community with integrated sales of apparel featured in the editorial. She has also published numerous articles on fashion and fitness for such outlets as California Apparel News and worked with celebrities as a fashion stylist.

In 2012, she co-wrote Affordable Couture (Vivays Publishing), a how-to guide for collecting and shopping for vintage and couture clothing.
