= Long Tall Sally (disambiguation) =

Long Tall Sally is a song by Little Richard.

Long Tall Sally may also refer to:

- Long Tall Sally (EP), by the Beatles
- The Beatles' Long Tall Sally, an album by the Beatles
- Long Tall Sally (retailer), an American women's clothing retailer
