= MODE (magazine) =

Plus-sized fashion magazine

Mode
- editor in chief: Corynne Corbett (2000-2001)
- Former editors: Abbie Britton (1997-2000)
- Categories: Fashion magazine
- Frequency: Quarterly (1997), ten issues (1998), Monthly (1999-2001)
- Publisher: Julie Lewit-Nirenberg and Nancy Nadler LeWinter
- Founder: Julie Lewit-Nirenberg and Nancy Nadler LeWinter
- Founded: 1997
- First issue: 1997
- Final issue Number: October 2001; 600,000
- Company: Freedom Communications
- Country: United States
- Based in: New York City
- Language: English
- ISSN: 1091-0271

MODE (stylized MODE) was a fashion magazine aimed towards plus-size women which launched in the spring of 1997. The magazine was praised for targeting the plus-size consumer with a Vogue-like fashion philosophy. MODE also helped to increase the growth of the plus-size industry and the caliber of plus-size clothing and advertising. In 1997, MODE was named the best new magazine launch by Ad Week and Advertising Age. MODE also ran model search competitions in conjunction with the Wilhelmina modeling agency, drawing entries from thousands of hopefuls from the US and Canada. Its circulation was approximately 600,000 at the time of its demise in October 2001.

== History ==
Publishing veterans Julie Lewit-Nirenberg and Nancy Nadler LeWinter, who had experience for magazines such as Vogue, Esquire, Harper's Bazaar, Mademoiselle and Marie Claire, began developing MODE in 1996. The first issue launched in February 1997 with a circulation of 250,000 copies. MODE received strong positive reception from readers(over 8,000 pieces of fan mail in just over a year) and from the press. After MODE launched, agencies increased their rosters of plus-size models and retailers improved the production value of their advertising. Freedom Publications bought a 50% stake in the magazine in late 1997. MODE started a partnership with Butterick Publishing Company to produce patterns, and began planning other ventures including a website, TV programming, and syndicated newspaper columns. The magazine also received acclaim, being named the best new magazine launch by Ad Week and Advertising Age in 1997. MODE began running model searches in conjunction with the Wilhelmina modeling agency in 1998, drawing entries from thousands of hopefuls from the US and Canada.

Advance Publications, the parent company of Conde Nast Publications, made negotiations to purchase Lewit and Lewinter Inc. in 2001, but the deal did not go through. Occurring shortly before the time of MODE closure was the failure of several designers' ventures into the plus-size market. Versace (GV Versatile Couture), Valentino (Carisma), and others ceased producing the clothing which MODE magazine relied upon, leaving an unfortunate deficit in both the fashion department wardrobes and advertising revenue coffers of MODE magazine and its successors. Its circulation was approximately 600,000 at the time of its demise in late 2001.

== Editors ==
- Abbie Britton (1997-2000)
- Corynne Corbett (2000-2001)
