= Huffine =

Huffine is a surname. Surname is Germanic. Notable people with the surname include:

- Candice Huffine (born 1984), American model
- Ken Huffine (1897–1977), American football player and coach
- Joshua Huffine (Born 1983),

American

== See also ==
- Don Huffines (born 1958), American politician and businessman
