= Kenneth Willardt =

Danish photographer

Kenneth Willardt is a Danish photographer based in New York City, specializing in celebrity, beauty, and fashion portraiture.

== Life and work ==
Willardt grew up in Espergaerde, Denmark, near Copenhagen. He studied at the Danish School of Photography in Copenhagen and apprenticed under photographer Torsten Graae. He moved to New York City in 1987 where he has worked on beauty and fashion-focused editorials and campaigns.

Willardt has worked for Christian Dior, Nivea, L'Oréal, Pantene, and Target. He has done editorial work for W Magazine, Vanity Fair (U.S and Italian), Allure, GQ, InStyle, the British and U.S. editions of Glamour, the Brazilian, Chinese, Japanese, German and Spanish editions of Vogue, A-Anna Magazine, Cosmopolitan, Marie Claire, and Seventeen. He has done a television campaign for Maybelline, and their 2009 "Maybelline Loves New York" and 2010 calendars.

For Willardt's 2013 exhibition Size Does Matter, Plus-size model Robyn Lawley was photographed nude with various animals, including rabbits, an owl, an octopus and tarantulas. Each image in the exhibit had a QR code. When the QR code was scanned with a cell phone, added movement in the image was visible on the cell phone screen. In addition to the images in the gallery, a billboard with Lawley flanked by bunnies was placed on the West Side Highway in Manhattan.

== Awards ==
- 2003: "Photographer of the Year" award, Pantene Pro-V Beauty Awards, London.

== Exhibitions ==
- 2003: "Bullseye" branding campaign "Sign of the Times" for Target was included in the Cooper Hewitt, National Design Museum's 2003 National Design Triennial.
- 2013: Size Does Matter, 588 Gallery, Chelsea, New York, November – December 2013. Solo exhibition.

== Publications ==
- Beauty Book. Kempen, Germany: teNeues, 2014. ISBN 978-3-8327-9879-6. In conjunction with an exhibition at 588 Gallery, Chelsea, New York.
