= Zharkov =

Zharkov or Jarkov (Russian: Жарков) is a Russian masculine surname, its feminine counterpart is Zharkova or Jarkova. Notable people with the surname include:

- Andrei Zharkov, Soviet ice dancer
- Daniil Zharkov (born 1994), Russian ice hockey player
- Georgi Zharkov (1918–1981), Russian football player and coach
- Innokenti Zharkov (born 1996), Russian football player
- Katya Zharkova, Belarusian model and actress
- Lyudmila Maslakova (née Zharkova in 1952), Soviet sprinter
- Olga Jarkova (born 1979), Russian curler
- Vladimir Zharkov (born 1988), Russian ice hockey player
- Dmitry Zharkov,4 times world dance sport champion

== See also ==
- Jarkov Mammoth
