= Hot Topic =

American retail chain

Hot Topic, Inc.

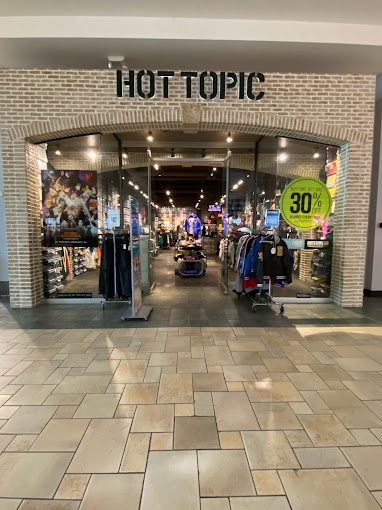
- Hot Topic inside Southern Park Mall in Boardman, Ohio, in 2020
- Type: Private
- Industry: Retail
- Founded: October 1989; 37 years ago Montclair Plaza; Montclair, California, U.S.
- Founder: Orv Madden
- Headquarters: City of Industry, California, U.S.
- Number of locations: 675 (April 2020)
- Key people: Steve Vranes (CEO) (2016–present); Betsy McLaughlin (CEO) (2000–2011); Bruce Quinell (chairman of the board)
- Products: Clothing, accessories, music, jewelry
- Owner: Spencer Gifts
- Divisions: Blackheart Lingerie; BoxLunch
- Website: www.hottopic.com

Hot Topic, Inc. is an American fast fashion company specializing in counterculture-related clothing and accessories, as well as licensed music. The stores are aimed towards an audience interested in alternative music, anime, and video gaming, and most of their audience ranges from teens to young adults. In 2007, approximately 40% of Hot Topic's revenue came from sales of licensed band T-shirts. The majority of the stores are located in regional shopping malls.

== History ==
The first Hot Topic store was opened in November 1989 in Montclair Plaza, Montclair, California, by Orv Madden, a former executive at The Children's Place, who retired as CEO in 2000 and was replaced by Betsy McLaughlin, who headed the company until 2011. Lisa Harper assumed the position of CEO in March 2011 until Steve Vranes was announced as the new CEO in 2016. The company went public and began trading on NASDAQ in 1996.

In 2013, Hot Topic announced its sale to private equity firm Sycamore Partners for $600 million. The company ceased publishing financial data after 2013, as previously required as a public company.

In 2024, Hot Topic was the subject of what cybersecurity firm Hudson Rock labeled the "largest retail data breach in history," involving the theft of personal data belonging to 350 million customers of Hot Topic, Box Lunch, and Torrid, with the stolen data reportedly including names, emails, addresses, phone numbers, birthdates, and partial credit card numbers.

On August 7, 2026, Spencer Spirit Holdings—owner of rival chain Spencer's Gifts—announced that it would acquire Hot Topic from Sycamore Partners for an undisclosed amount; following the completion of the sale, Hot Topic will operate as an independent subsidiary, maintaining its California headquarters and retail banners. Combined with the Spencer's Gifts and Spirit Halloween chains, the combined company will operate over 3,000 stores across the United States and Canada.

== Product assortment and sales ==
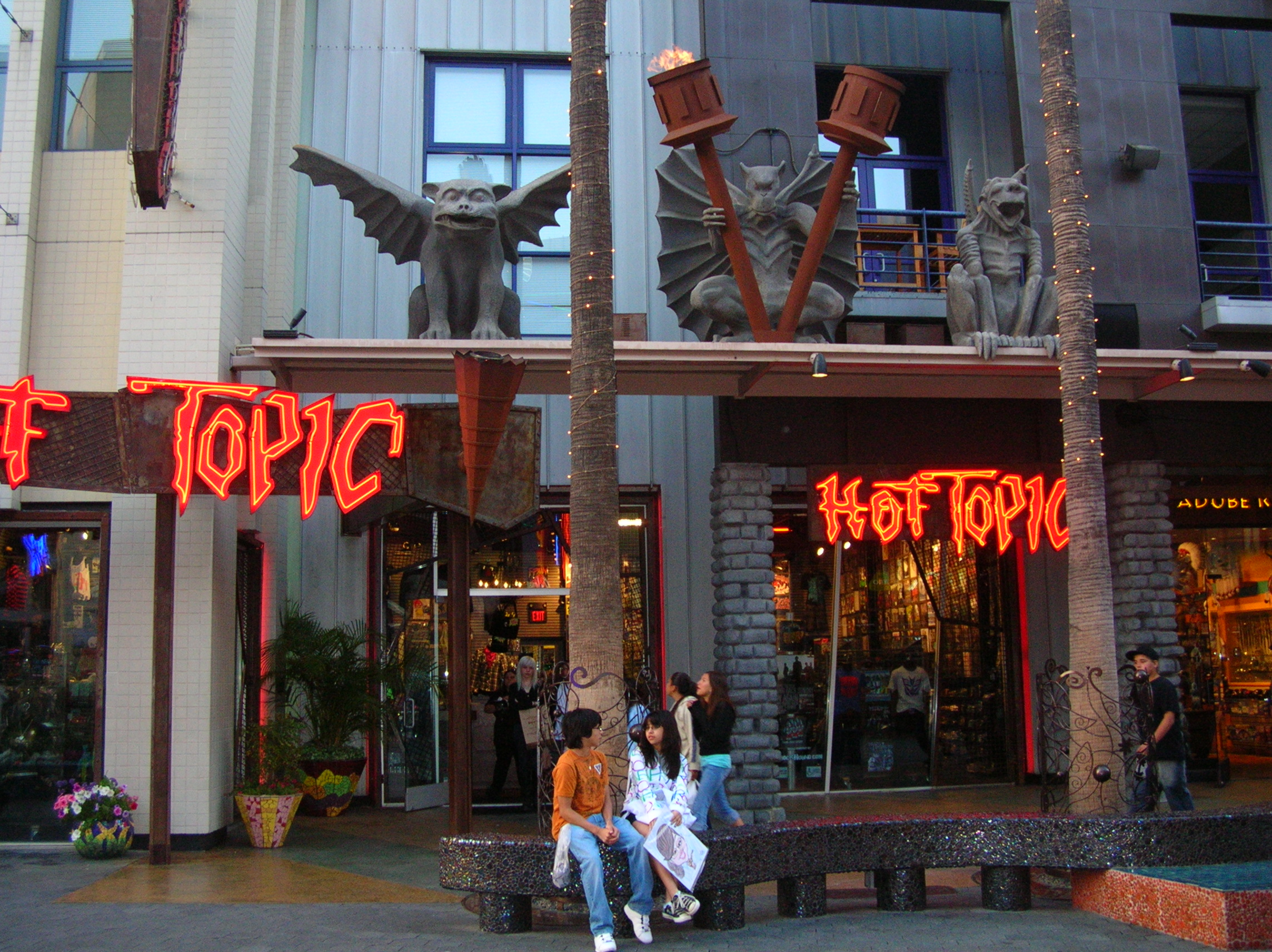
Hot Topic at Universal CityWalk in Hollywood, California, displaying the Hot Topic logo used during the peak of the company's popularity.

The store has gone through a number of phases in its history, reflective of various alternative culture and pop culture and geek culture trends (prime examples being Lolita, goth, and cosplay outfits). In the early 2000s, the store was known for heavily marketing nu-metal merchandise relating to bands. During that period, the store was also known for its sales of controversial gel bracelets (often rumored to be "sex bracelets") as well as the equally controversial styles of phat pants-inspired bondage pants popular among teenagers in the late 1990s and early-to-mid 2000s.

The store later focused on skinny jeans and merchandise related to scene, emo, and hardcore punk music and fashion, with a much larger focus on goth, spiky chokers, and clothing. At present, the store's selection is largely focused on licensed video game merchandise and internet memes popular on sites such as Tumblr, as well as anime, manga, Japanese films, and the associated otaku subculture.

== Ventures ==
Hot Topic launched Torrid, a concept store that sells clothing for plus-size women, in 2001. While still under the same parent umbrella as Hot Topic, in 2015 the company branched off to become Torrid, LLC.

In 2008, Hot Topic launched ShockHound, an online retailer and social networking music site. In March 2011, Hot Topic made a public statement announcing the shutdown of ShockHound. The site is no longer live, all merchandise was moved to HotTopic.com, and the company ceased sales of MP3s.

In August 2010, Hot Topic opened its first locations outside of the U.S., opening two Canadian stores at the Square One Shopping Centre in Mississauga on August 11, and then at Scarborough Town Centre in Toronto the following day. The company has since also opened additional Canadian locations as well as locations in Puerto Rico.

In 2012, Hot Topic launched Blackheart Lingerie, a concept store that sells lingerie and clothing for women. Blackheart products have since reverted to being sold in Hot Topic stores, although they still retain the same branding.

On May 26, 2015, Hot Topic announced its intent to acquire Geeknet Inc., owner of the online retailer ThinkGeek, for $122 million. However, the company received a $140 million counter-offer from GameStop, which Hot Topic did not choose to exceed.

On October 14, 2015, Hot Topic launched BoxLunch, a gift and novelty retail store. For every $10 spent, a meal is donated to a person in need.

== Tour sponsorship ==
The company sponsored the 2004 Ozzfest concert tour, the 2005 through 2007 Sounds of the Underground tour, the 2008 Taste of Chaos tour, and had a stage at and sponsored the 2008 and 2009 Rockstar Energy Drink Mayhem Festival tours. The company went on to sponsor Black Veil Brides 2014 Black Mass tour with special guests Falling in Reverse.
