= Robyn Lawley =

Australian model (born 1989)

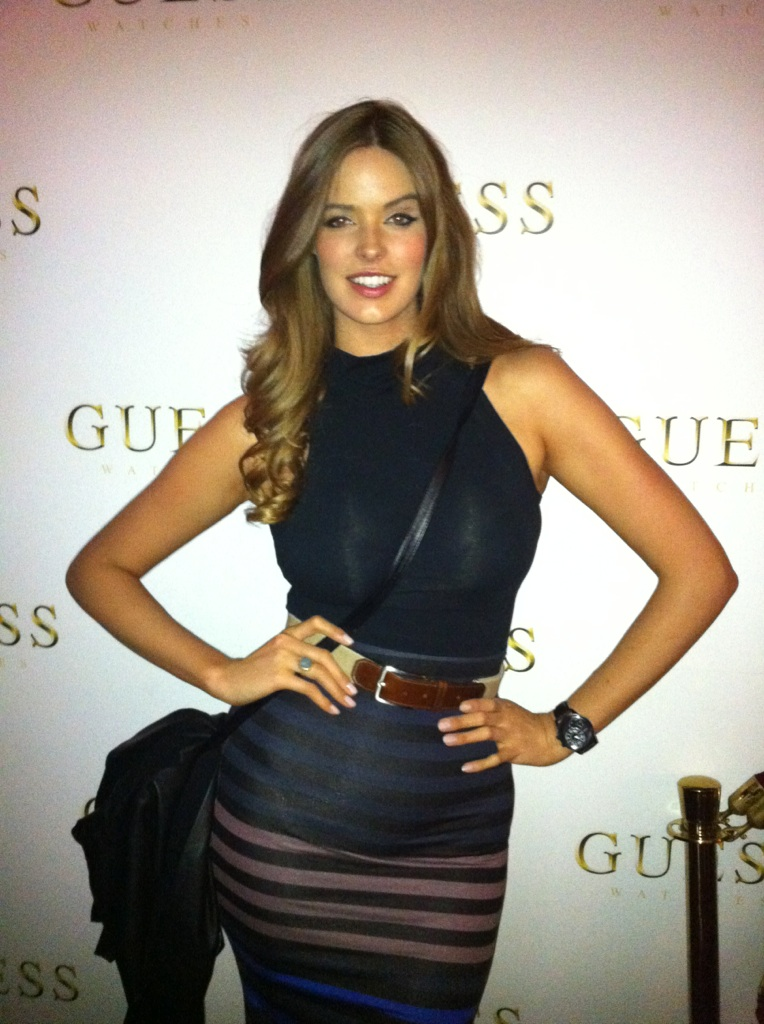
- Robyn Lawley at the Guess Accessory Launch in Sydney, Australia
- Born: 13 June 1989 (age 37); Girraween, New South Wales, Australia
- Occupation: Fashion model
- Modeling information
- Height: 1.89 m (6 ft 2 1/2 in)
- Hair color: Brown
- Eye color: Blue-green
- Agency: Ford Models (New York); New Madison (Paris); Why Not Model Management (Milan) Bella models Australia; Milk Management (London); Francina Models (Barcelona); MIKAs (Stockholm)

Robyn Lawley (born 13 June 1989) is an Australian model, writer, photographer and director. She has appeared in Sports Illustrated, Elle, and other publications. She has been outspoken in her support for size-inclusiveness in the fashion and modeling industry and led a boycott which compelled Victoria's Secret to make changes to their annual fashion show.

== Early life and family ==
Robyn was born in Girraween, New South Wales, to Chris and Janne Lawley; and has two older sisters, Shona and Jennifer. Robyn attended Macarthur Girls High School. Robyn went to see a mainstream agency when she was 15 and although they were ready to sign her, she didn't feel ready. After taking a year off she returned and started doing straight size modeling for a year. Finding it to be not worth the effort of maintaining the size 8 that was required, she signed with Bella model management, a "plus size" modeling agency in Australia, when she was 18.

== Career ==
=== Modelling ===
Lawley's first magazine shoot was for Dolly in 2006. At the beginning of her career she appeared in a plus-size clothing range for New Zealand brand EziBuy. Lawley has modelled for the cover of French Elle, Marie Claire (France, Australia) and Cosmopolitan. In June 2011, Lawley featured on the cover of Vogue Italia alongside fellow plus-sized models Tara Lynn and Candice Huffine, shot by Steven Meisel. In addition, she appeared on the March 2012 cover of Madison, becoming the first Australian plus-sized model to appear on the cover of an Australian fashion magazine, as well as the first plus-size model to appear in an editorial specifically produced for Australian Vogue. Lawley has also appeared in editorials for Dazed & Confused, Glamour, Marie Claire Hungary and the British and Croatian editions of Elle.

Lawley has walked for designers including Peter Morrissey at Australian Fashion Week, Elena Miro at Milan Fashion Week as well as in a one-woman show for OneStopPlus, streamed on to a New York Times Square moving billboard.

Lawley has appeared in campaigns for plus-size brands including Evans, Lane Bryant, Marina Rinaldi and Persona Collezioni. Lawley also modeled for the debut of H & M's inclusive line as well as Mango's plus-size line, Violeta by Mango. She modeled for the debut and several other collections of Swan by Clements Ribeiro for Evans, designed by husband and wife duo Suzanne Clements and Inacio Ribeiro. Lawley appeared in campaigns for Ralph Lauren, becoming the first plus-size model to be used in their in-store advertising. Lawley appeared in Lane Bryant's rebranding campaign, which included print magazine ads and several billboards in New York City.

Lawley has also appeared in advertising for brands such as Calezdonia's Summer 2012 campaign photographed by Raphael Mazzucco and Boux Avenue lingerie. She also appeared in campaigns for lingerie brand Chantelle, photographed by Greg Kadel along with models including Maryna Linchuk. Her first beauty campaign was Face Time for Barneys New York Holiday 2013, photographed by Ben Hassett.

Lawley was photographed by Kenneth Willardt for a fine art exhibition, Size Does Matter. The show was on exhibit from November to December 2013 at the 588 Gallery in Chelsea. Lawley was photographed nude with various animals, including rabbits, an owl, an octopus and tarantulas. Each image in the exhibit had a QR code. When the QR code was scanned with a cell phone, added movement in the image was visible on the cell phone screen. In addition to the images in the gallery, a billboard with Lawley flanked by bunnies was placed on the West Side Highway in Manhattan.

In early 2015, Robyn Lawley became a Sports Illustrated "Rookie", making her the first "plus-size" model to be featured in the magazine's annual Swimsuit Issue. The assistant managing editor of Sports Illustrated had stated that Lawley "had been on her radar for years and is being highlighted as a model rather than as a "plus size" model." Lawley has been in the issue, 2015, 2016, 2017 and in 2018 she also filmed the series "In her own words".

In 2016 Robyn Lawley became Westfields beauty ambassador and starred in the 2016/17 campaigns across Australia called “Join the front line”

During the 2020-2021 pandemic, Lawley created a podcast series called “Everybody” with Robyn Lawley via Audible.

Interviewing guests like Turia Pitt and Jameela Jamil—as well as 'ordinary' people who continue to conquer the world in spite of chronic illness—Lawley turns a critical eye on the #BodyPositive movement.

=== Fashion design ===
Lawley's swimwear line, designed by Lawley in collaboration with Bond-Eye Swimwear, launched in August 2013. The swimwear was produced in sizes 8 (US) to 18 (US), with plans to extend the size range in the future.

=== Photography and videographer/director ===
Lawley photographed Tara Lynn for Galore Magazine Issue 4. Lawley's photographs of Leah Kelley in her swimwear line went viral on social media and were covered by notable fashion websites. Lawley also video the documentary "in her own words" for Sports Illustrated.

Lawley filmed and directed Myla DalBesio's debut collection commercial for Prima Donna Lingerie

=== Cooking ===
The success of Lawley's food blog, "Robyn Lawley Eats" led to her receiving a contract with Random House to publish a cookbook with original recipes, family recipes and tips on eating at restaurants around the world. Her recipes have been featured on Australian television and on the website of Good Morning America.

Lawley has become vegan and since has publicly spoken against her own cookbook wanting to redo but plant based.

=== Activism ===
Lawley has also become a PETA Australia ambassador since going vegan. In 2022 she voiced a PETA cartoon, playing the role of 'Sidney the crocodile' who is abused and killed for fashion.

In 2023 Lawley became the ambassador of cruelty free and vegan beauty and makeup brand Inika Organic.

=== Writing ===
Lawley has written two articles on body image for The Daily Beast. Her first article, in September 2012 addressed the media's response to Lady Gaga's weight gain. The second article, in October 2013, addressed the thigh gap trend.

In 2018, Lawley started an Online petition against lingerie brand Victoria Secret. The petition was created to ‘help change the minds of Victoria’s Secret to be more diverse and inclusive of body shapes and sizes on their runways!’ The petition garnered over 10,000 signatures worldwide.

Victoria Secret cancelled their show, but has subsequently completely rebranded now, including size diversity in their new VScollective.

Lawley also writes a monthly column for 9honey website.

== Awards ==
Lawley was voted the winner of the Australian Cosmopolitan Fun, Fearless Female, Rising Star Award 2011. Lawley was also selected for Sydney Magazine's Top 100 Most Influential People of the year award for 2011. In June 2013, Lawley was awarded Model of the Year during the Full Figured Fashion Week.
