= Betsy McLaughlin =

American businesswoman (born 1960)

- Born: October 1960 (age 65); Boston, Massachusetts, U.S.
- Education: University of California, Irvine (BA)

Betsy McLaughlin is an American businesswoman who was the CEO of Hot Topic from 2000 to 2011. She is on consumer boards in the retail and restaurant sectors.

== Education ==
McLaughlin was born in 1960 in Boston, Massachusetts. She attended Estancia High School in Costa Mesa, California before earning a Bachelor of Arts degree in economics from the University of California, Irvine.

== Career ==
Prior to Hot Topic, McLaughlin worked for Millers Outpost and The Broadway in finance, merchandising, and operations roles. McLaughlin joined Hot Topic as the vice president of operations in 1993 when the company was in its start up stage and had 15 stores. In 1996, prior to the company's IPO (NASDAQ:HOTT), she was promoted to senior vice president of merchandising and marketing. She became president in 1998.

In 2000, McLaughlin succeeded Hot Topic founder Orv Madden as CEO of the company and was appointed to the board of directors. In 2001, McLaughlin founded the second Hot Topic division called Torrid (NYSE:CURV), a plus-size retail chain aimed at young women.

During McLaughlin's tenure as CEO, the corporation was included on the Forbes list of “200 Hot Companies”, Fortune “100 Fastest Growing Companies”, Bloomberg Businessweek's “Hot Growth Companies”, and Fortune's “100 Best Companies to Work for”. McLaughlin was selected by Investor's Business Daily as one of the “Top 5 Business Leaders of 2003” and "Top 10 CEOs with Vision", by Ad Age as one of the “Marketing 50”, and in 2005, was named by Institutional Investor as one of the “Best CEOs in America”. In 2010, Hot Topic was #1 on Forbes’ list of “Most Trustworthy Retailers” and named by Fast Company as one of the “Most Innovative Companies” in retail.

McLaughlin has received a number of awards for her "think outside the box" approach to strategy and leadership, specifically the recruiting and training of a primarily young work force to manage brick and mortar locations. She is also known for developing a growth culture built on exceeding expectations of both customers and team members.

In 2011, McLaughlin resigned from Hot Topic. McLaughlin now sits on the boards of BARK (NYSE:BARK), 5.11 Tactical, Everlane, Lazy Dog Restaurants, Dolls Kill, Good American and PetSmart Charities. She also consults on branding, marketing, leadership and organization development for organizations in the consumer sector. Previously, McLaughlin sat on the boards of Noodles (NASDAQ:NDLS), Pinkberry, Kriser's All Natural Pet, Veggie Grill and on the board of visitors and executive committee of the UCLA Anderson School of Management. In 2018, McLaughlin was named “Director of the Year” for early stage/high growth companies by the Forum for Corporate Directors.
