= Selene Luna =

American actress

Selene Luna (born September 19, 1971, Tijuana, Baja California, Mexico) is a Mexican-American actress, comedian, burlesque performer, and model known for her roles on comedian Margaret Cho's reality TV series The Cho Show and in such films as My Bloody Valentine 3D.

She also performed with the burlesque troupe Velvet Hammer Burlesque and is the creator of her own one woman show entitled I Don't Care Anymore. She appeared on the cover for the Dwarves 2001 album How to Win Friends and Influence People.

== Filmography ==
- Mayans M.C. (2022-2023)
- Huluween Dragstravaganza (2022)
- Coco (2017) as Tía Rosita
- Gingerdead Man 3: Saturday Night Cleaver (2011)
- Demonic Toys 2 (2010)
- Star-ving (2009)
- My Bloody Valentine 3D (2009)
- Celebrity Family Feud (2008)
- The Cho Show (2008)
- Firecracker (2005)
