= Herb Williams (American football) =

American football player (born 1958)

No. 23, 42
- Position: Defensive back

Personal information
- Born: August 30, 1958 (age 68); Lafayette, Louisiana, U.S.
- Listed height: 6 ft 1 in (1.85 m)
- Listed weight: 190 lb (86 kg)

Career information
- High school: McKinley (Baton Rouge, Louisiana)
- College: Southern
- NFL draft: 1980: 6th round, 139th overall pick

Career history
- San Francisco 49ers (1980); St. Louis Cardinals (1981–1982); Oklahoma Outlaws (1984)

Career NFL statistics
- Games played: 9
- Games started: 2
- Stats at Pro Football Reference

Herbert Earl Williams (born April 30, 1958) is an American former professional football player who was a defensive back for three seasons in the National Football League (NFL). He previously played college football for the Southern Jaguars. He played in the NFL for one season with the San Francisco 49ers then two with the St. Louis Cardinals.
