= The Cho Show =

- Starring: Margaret Cho; Selene Luna
- Opening theme: Watch Me Move
- Composer: Fefe Dobson
- Country of origin: United States
- No. of seasons: 1
- No. of episodes: 7

Production
- Executive producers: Margaret Cho; Rico Martinez; Dan Lindau; Katherine Dore; Alex Demyanenko; Jeff Olde; Jill Holmes; Noah Pollack; Jennifer Levy
- Producer: Justin Silva
- Cinematography: Jacob Pinger
- Running time: 30 minutes
- Production company: Crossroads Television

Original release
- Network: VH1
- Release: August 21 – September 25, 2008

The Cho Show is a reality-sitcom starring comedian Margaret Cho which premiered on VH1 on August 21, 2008. The series follows Cho as she interacts with her family and friends, including her mother and her assistant Selene Luna. Sandra Bernhard, Wanda Sykes, Michelle Rodriguez, Kat Von D, Nina Hartley and Joan Rivers make appearances during the show's first season. The premiere episode, titled "Korean of the Year", was available for download from the U.S. iTunes Store for free. The DVD of the show was released in Australia on 4 March 2009.

== Episodes ==
=== Korean of the Year ===
First aired August 21, 2008

Margaret announces to her parents that she is being honored as the "Korean of the Year." Although her parents are excited, Margaret is hesitant to accept the award as it dredges up old memories of the Korean community's less-than-stellar response to her career. Already stressed, Margaret's parents surprise her with a baby outfit in their ongoing attempt for grandchildren. Meanwhile, Charlie and Stapleton battle to give Margaret the perfect dress for the event. On the night of the award show, Margaret nervously performs to a surprisingly adoring Korean crowd and finally gains the acceptance that had eluded her.

=== Cho-Universe Pageant ===
First aired August 28, 2008

After struggling throughout their lives to meet society's expectations of conventional beauty, Margaret and Selene decide to hold their own mother-daughter beauty pageant. Acting on the advice of a pageant queen, the women explore the worlds of spray tanning and ventriloquism as they prepare for the big day. The Cho-Universe Pageant is a huge success celebrating Margaret's dream of embracing all types of beauty. Celebrity judges included Michelle Rodriguez, Alec Mapa, and Chenese Lewis. Margaret's talent for the pageant was dressing up like Sherrie Lewis and her assistant was Lambchop in a hilarious rendition of the old show "Lambchop". The pageant ends in a draw amongst all the contestants as Margaret and the judges felt they were all beautiful in their own way and should be accepted as they are.

=== Off the Grid ===
First aired September 4, 2008

Interested in exploring the green movement, Margaret decides to take the gang into the wilderness in order to disconnect themselves with today's modern luxuries. The group begins to fight with each other as they are forced to live in a tent and forage for food. After days of living "off the grid," Margaret finally allows the group to eat real food. During the meal, the Chos relate stories of their struggles during the Korean War giving the group a newfound appreciation of their lives. Guest appearance by Gary Busey.

=== Two Chos, One Cup ===
First aired September 11, 2008

In a quest to explore the world of paparazzi-obsessed celebrity, Margaret decides to make a pop single and a mock sex tape. While she is busy with her new careers, Margaret enlists the help of Selene to keep her parents distracted. Although her song turns out well, she realizes that she has taken things too far with the sex tape and decides to redirect her focus on the thing that has brought her success - her comedy.

=== Dr. 9021-Cho ===
First aired September 18, 2008

With her 40th birthday quickly approaching, Margaret starts to consider the process of aging in Hollywood. After exploring various anti-aging methods such as plastic surgery and anal bleaching, Margaret finds her own ways to age gracefully; being a well-tattooed cougar.

=== Haunt-Gina ===
First aired September 25, 2008

After being told by a psychic that a ghost was living in her vagina, Margaret starts to experience writer's block. Worried that the ghost might be causing it, Margaret tries various ways to remedy the situation. In an effort to help Margaret, Selene tries her hand at comedy writing and seeks guidance from the Cho's. With the help of her friends Margaret has a creative breakthrough and is able to make peace with her haunted vagina and perform.

=== Cho Place Like Home ===
First aired September 25, 2008 (season finale)

After receiving news that she will be honored by having a day named after her, Margaret returns to her hometown of San Francisco. Eager to re-connect with people from her past, Margaret and her parents hope to see Forbes, their elusive family friend that helped raise Margaret. After a whirlwind trip through San Francisco filled with both fun and emotion, Margaret finally gets her day and decides that Margaret Cho Day will be known as a holiday that accepts everyone who has ever felt like an outsider.
