= Karlous Miller =

American comedian, actor and rapper (born 1983)

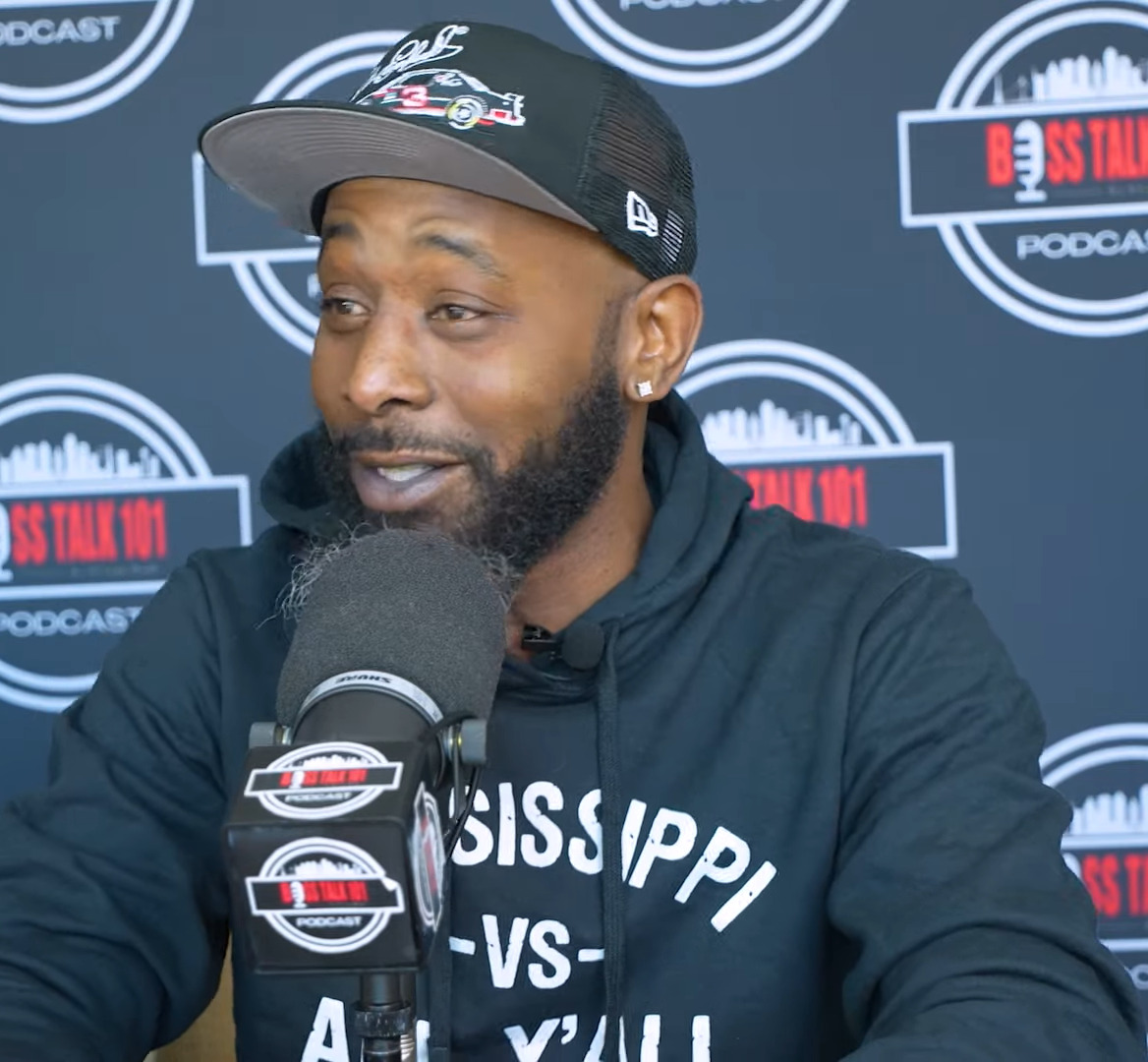
- Miller in 2025
- Born: Karlous Bernard Miller; April 2, 1983 (age 43); Oxford, Mississippi, U.S
- Children: 1

Comedy career
- Years active: 2004-present
- Medium: Stand-up; film; television
- Genres: Observational comedy; insult comedy; Black comedy
- Website: karlousm.com

Karlous Bernard Miller (born April 2, 1983) is an American comedian, actor and rapper. He began his comedy career in Oxford, Mississippi then later moved to Atlanta, Georgia to further his career and is widely known for his successful podcast/comedy tour The 85 South Show, along with being a cast member on MTV's comedy improv series, Wild 'n Out and his notorious "Wildstyle" battles with fellow cast member, D.C. Young Fly and Chico Bean. He was a Contestant on “Last Comic Standing” (Season 8)

== Early life ==
Miller was born in Oxford, Mississippi. He was born into a large blended family, having five siblings. He was a firefighter before moving to Atlanta, to pursue a career as a stand-up comedian in 2005.

== Career ==
Miller performing stand-up comedy in 2019

His first television appearance was on Robert Townsend's: Partners in Crime - The New Generation. He has since appeared in multiple TV shows such as Hell Date, Yo Momma, Bill Bellamy's Who's Got Jokes, The Mo'nique Show, Off the Chain, Comic View, Last Comic Standing and Wild 'n Out.

Miller has also been featured in written publications for MTV, EarHustle411, Oxford Citizen along with V-103's Frank and Wanda morning television/radio show and Atlanta's Hot 107.9.

== Other media ==
Miller is said to have a passion for music, most notably evident in his battle raps against Chico Bean on Wild 'n Out. This would open doors for him to work with numerous musicians such as Gucci Mane, Case, Dem Franchize Boyz, Granddaddy Souf, Big Oomp, Big K.R.I.T, Jermaine Dupri, T.I. and many more.

In 2015, Miller, D.C. Young Fly and later, Chico, started their own podcast, called The 85 South Show, where they speak on various topics, interact with the audience, and freestyle on songs.

In October 2018, Miller confirmed on the Breakfast Club that he won't appear in the upcoming season of Wild'n Out, and that he had been fired. However, he was eventually brought back to the show per fans' requests.

== Influences ==
Miller stated his comedic influences consists of Redd Foxx, Bernie Mac, Mo'Nique, Richard Pryor, Eddie Murphy, Cedric the Entertainer and Steve Harvey. Miller also attributes his comedic influence to his family and acknowledges them in his boisterous and edgy humor.

== Personal life ==
Miller was in a casual relationship with fellow comedian Ashima Franklin. They welcomed their son in December 2008. Karlous Miller has been single since April 2024 and refers to himself as "sexually homeless" since December 2021.

== Filmography ==
=== Film ===
Year	Title	Role	Notes
2005	Glorious Mail	Flyree Johnson	
2019	How High 2	Larry	
2020	2 Minutes of Fame	Comic Finalist	
2023	Da 'Partments	Poncho	
2026	Haunted Heist	Terrance, also known as "T".	
2026	Da 'Partments 2	Poncho	
2026	A Proud Family Wizmas	Benny	
2026	Lil Kev: Season 2	TBA	

=== Television ===
Year	Title	Role	Notes
2008	Hell Date	Himself	Recurring Cast: Season 2
2013-	Wild 'n Out	Himself	Main Cast: Season 5-
2014	ComicView	Himself	Episode: "May 27, 2014"
2014	Last Comic Standing	Himself/Contestant	Main Cast: Season 8
2016	Joking Off	Himself	Episode: "Host Deray Davis, Jon Gabrus, Karlous Miller"
2016	Wild 'N On Tour	Himself	Main Cast
2017	All Def Comedy	Himself	Episode: "Episode #1.6"
2017	Family Time	De'Andre	Episode: "Love Tat"
2018	Black Card Revoked	Himself	Episode: "Brandon T. Jackson, Karlous Miller, Finesse Mitchell"
2019	Last Call	LJ	Episode: "Snowpocalypse"
2020-21	BET Hip Hop Awards	Himself/Co-Host	Main Co-Host
