= Hell Date =

2007 American TV series

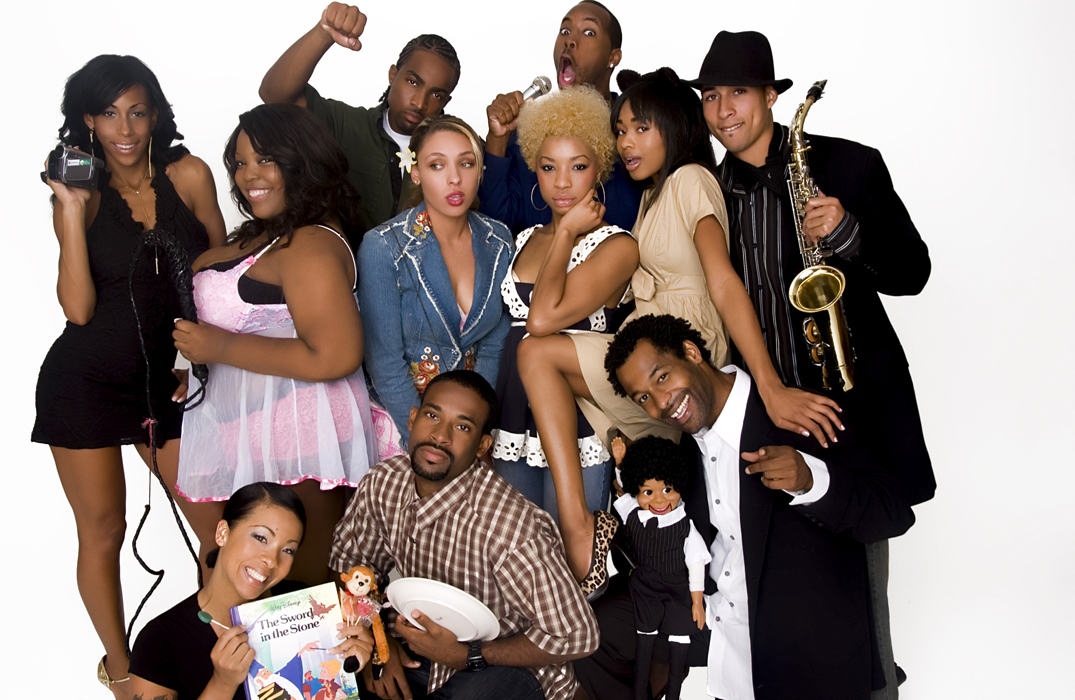
- A partial group of "Hell Daters"
- Starring: Chris "The Devil" Hollyfield
- Country of origin: United States

Production
- Production locations: Los Angeles (season 1); Atlanta, GA (season 2)
- Running time: 30 minutes (including commercials)

Original release
- Network: BET
- Release: 2007 – 2008

Hell Date is a prank dating show that aired BET. The show was created by Peter M. Cohen and produced by Peter M. Cohen Productions. The show presented itself as a typical dating show, such as Blind Date, however it featured actors pretending to be a contestant/participant on the show, and portraying a character, with their goal being to make the date an unpleasant experience. Unbeknownst to one unsuspecting dater, who is not aware of the setup.

The show aired for two seasons, with both seasons having slightly different formats, yet the idea was primarily the same. The first season was filmed in the Los Angeles area. The second season was filmed in the Atlanta metropolitan areas. At the end of 2007, BET greenlist 64 more episodes.

== Series overview ==
=== Season one format ===
In the first season, two segments were shown per episode.

In the beginning of the segment, an unsuspecting dater, (who is unaware that this is not a legitimate dating show and he or she believes is on a typical dating show) described themselves to the audience.

Immediately following, an actor known as the "Hell Dater", would describe themselves to the audience, letting the audience know that he or she is an actor and playing a character, and their objective is to purposefully make this a terrible date for their unsuspecting partner.

The unsuspecting dater, and the hell date actor then met and introduced themselves to each other.

At first, the actor shows very mild hints of annoyance on the date, to where the unsuspecting dater is bothered, but isn't at a level to where the date becomes abnormal.

However as the date progresses, (more especially towards the very end of the date.) the actors become increasingly more extreme and uncomfortable with their character, making it very embarrassing and torturing for the unsuspecting dater.

At the end of the date, the victimized dater is informed that this is a prank show and that they are on "Hell Date." This is done by a character named "The Devil" who is a little person dressed in a devil costume.

The unsuspecting dater would then be interviewed on their experience on "Hate Date"

This is when the segment ends. If this was the first segment, the second segment is done in an identical format. At the end of the second segment, the episode ends.

=== Season two format ===
The second season had a slightly different format.

Each episode featured only one unsuspecting dater and one single segment.

In the beginning of each episode, "The Devil" in a prerecorded scene is sitting in a dark room and conversing with and describes three hell date actors, and the character they are portraying to the unsuspecting dater.

The unsuspecting dater in a separate scene (who is unaware that this is not a legitimate dating show and he or she believes is on a typical dating show) would then describe themselves to the audience.

The unsuspecting dater is then introduced to the three hell daters all at once, in which all four go on and participate in a small date activity.

The unsuspecting dater is given the privilege to eliminate two hell daters after this. Similar to that of ElimiDate.

This is however done in a sly method. Two of the hell daters act outrageously strange and insane for no apparent reason immediately within meeting the unsuspecting dater, while the third actor is purposefully putting on a normal facade.

This of course in turn makes the unsuspecting daters choice almost surefire.

After two of the hell daters are eliminated, the third hell dater who successfully put on a normal facade, actually turns out to be even more outrageous than the first two.

At this point for the remainder of the program, an identical format to season one is played out.

At the end of the date, the victimized dater is informed by The Devil that this is a prank show and that all three daters are actors, and that they are on "Hell Date."

The unsuspecting dater is then interviewed on their experience on the show. The program then ends.

== Partial list of notable actors who played the Hell Daters ==
- Daheli Hall
- Zainab Johnson
- Chenese Lewis
- Karlous Miller
- Ezra Masters

It is very common for some Hell Date actors to appear in several different episodes, if they repeat their same character or portray a different character.

== Reception ==
In The Spectator, Elizabeth Ault called Hell Date "compelling as an intervention into the hoax reality show genre". Mekeisha Madden Toby of The Detroit News found it to be "sick, twisted and full of guilty intrigue and humor". The New York Post reviewer Linda Stasi praised the show for having "great actors" and though "the genius here is that we then get the reactions of those who've been punk'd afterwards".
