= Long Tall Sally (retailer) =

Women's clothing retailer

- Type: Private
- Industry: Fashion retail
- Founded: 1976
- Headquarters: Peterborough, Cambridgeshire
- Area served: Worldwide
- Key people: A. Killingsworth (CEO); Saeed Hatteea (Chairman)
- Revenue: ▲£50 million (2016)
- Owner: Yours Clothing Group
- Number of employees: 400 (2016)
- Website: www.longtallsally.com

Long Tall Sally is a British fashion retailer specialising in clothing for tall women. Established in London in 1976, the business has developed from a specialist high-street retailer into an international online fashion brand. Since 2020, Long Tall Sally has been part of the Yours Clothing Group.

The company opened its first store on Chiltern Street in Marylebone in 1976 and subsequently expanded its retail and mail-order operations across the United Kingdom, North America and Germany. By 2012, Long Tall Sally had stores internationally, supported by catalogue and mail-order sales.

In 2008 the company started selling in North America through catalogue and web marketing, and in 2009 acquired the Canadian assets and trading operations of Tall Girl, including nine stores across Canada and the United States. The company later expanded its international portfolio through the acquisition of German tall-fashion retailer Long Fashion, US retailer Long Elegant Legs and US footwear business Barefoot Tess.

In August 2020, Long Tall Sally was acquired by the Yours Clothing Group, with the transaction completing on 1 September 2020. The group’s portfolio includes several fashion brands, such as Yours Clothing, Evans, M&Co, Bump It Up, BadRhino and Pixie Girl. Following the acquisition, the brand launched a new online platform and expanded its distribution through third-party retailers, including Next, Very and Debenhams.
