= Macarthur Girls High School =

Coordinates: 33.8130°S 151.0125°E

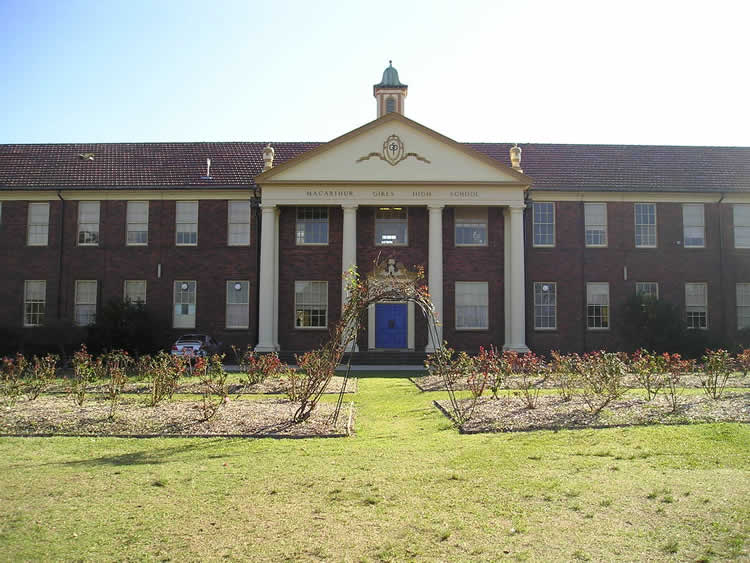

Location
- 1–19 Macarthur Street; Parramatta, New South Wales, 2150; Australia

Information
- School type: Public comprehensive secondary school
- Established: 1934
- Faculty: 35
- Years offered: Year 7 to Year 12
- Gender: Girls
- Enrolment: 1197
- Website: macarthurg-h.schools.nsw.gov.au

Macarthur Girls High School is situated on the Parramatta River next to Parramatta City, New South Wales, Australia. The school was named after John Macarthur, a pioneer of the Australian wool industry. The school was built in 1934 with later additions in 1955, 1975, 1996 and 2010. The school offers students a curriculum directed towards the Higher School Certificate with a combination of traditional and Vocational Education courses.

The school's 75th birthday was in 2009. The School Students Representative Council celebrated the event by renovating the rose garden.

== Background ==
Macarthur Girls High School is a large comprehensive school, with more than 1200 students, situated 20 km west of Sydney and adjacent to the Parramatta River.

Macarthur Girls have had many achievements, including first in the state for standard English in 2012.

In October 2018 a surprise visit to the school was made by the UK's Prince Harry and Meghan, Duchess of Sussex.

== School history ==
The school is located on an area of land first granted to William Reid (a seaman-convict from the Sirius, the first ship of the First Fleet to enter Sydney Harbour in 1788). Later the property was acquired by the Rev. Samuel Marsden where he built a new home, Newlands. The property changed hands several times before it was acquired by the Education Department and the present school was built in 1934.

Changes in the name of the school reflect the changing educational trends of the times.

- 1927–30 – The "Old School," originally located near Arthur Phillip High was known as Parramatta Commercial and Household Arts School.
- 1931–37 – Parramatta Domestic Science School
- 1938–41 – Parramatta District and Home Science School
- 1942–45 – Parramatta Secondary Central Home High School
- 1946–52 – Parramatta Home Science School
- 1953–58 – Parramatta Secondary Home Science School
- 1959 – Macarthur Girls High School
- 2010 – Macarthur Centre of Excellence

== Notable alumni ==
- Betty Cuthbert, Olympic gold medal winning runner
- Yalda Hakim, Dateline presenter
- Robyn Lawley, fashion model
