= Big Bud Press =

American clothing brand

- Type: Private
- Industry: Manufacturing, fashion
- Founded: 2015; 11 years ago Los Angeles, United States
- Founders: Lacey Micallef (founder); Philip Seastrom (co-owner)
- Headquarters: Los Angeles, California, U.S.
- Products: Clothing
- Website: Official website

Big Bud Press is an American clothing brand, known for their plus-size clothing and support of sustainability. Their predominantly unisex styles have gained notoriety. Founded, based, and manufactured in Los Angeles, the brand now has physical locations in California, New York City, and Chicago.
