= Miss Plus America =

Beauty pageant for plus-sized women

- Formation: 2002
- Founder: Melissa Stamper
- Type: Plus size pageant
- Headquarters: Nashville, Tennessee
- Location: United States
- Executive Producer: Marcella Meyer
- Website: Official website

Miss Plus America is a beauty pageant for plus-sized women. It began in 2002, to offer an alternative to mainstream pageants like Miss America, to which it has no affiliation.

All American women are eligible, so long as they are more than a size 14W.
