= M&Co. =

Scottish apparel retailer

M&Co Trading Limited
- Trade name: M&Co
- Formerly: Mackays
- Type: Private subsidiary
- Industry: Retail
- Founded: 1834; 192 years ago
- Founder: Neil, Len & Iain McGeoch
- Headquarters: Inchinnan, Renfrewshire; Mayfair, London
- Area served: Worldwide
- Key people: Saeed Hatteea (Chairman); Andrew Killingsworth (CEO)
- Brands: Yours Clothing; Long Tall Sally; BadRhino; PixieGirl; Evans; Star by Julien Macdonald; Whip&Woo; Niimee
- Revenue: ▲£257.6 million (2025)
- Number of employees: 2,000–3,000 (2025)
- Parent: Yours Clothing Group
- Website: www.mandco.com

M&Co. is a Scottish online fashion retailer and former high street chain store. Its head office is in Inchinnan, Scotland, though its main buying office is in Mayfair, London. Previously, its head office was at Caledonia House in Paisley.

Established in 1834 as pawnbrokers, Mackays switched to selling clothes in 1953 by brothers Len and Iain McGeoch. In 2005 the company rebranded as M&Co. The chain operates over 300 stores and also has an online presence. In 2023, it was announced that Yours Clothing Group had acquired the company.

== History ==
In 1953, Len and Iain McGeoch began converting their six pawnshops to clothing stores. In 1970, the company acquired Ghinns, extending its retail clothing business in the London area. In 1986, the company acquired Apparel Affiliates, owner of 140 retail stores in the United States. In 2005, the company began converting all 270 of its stores to the M&Co. banner. In March 2012, the first of several international franchise stores opened, beginning with the first of many in Dubai Mall, with further UAE expansion planned.

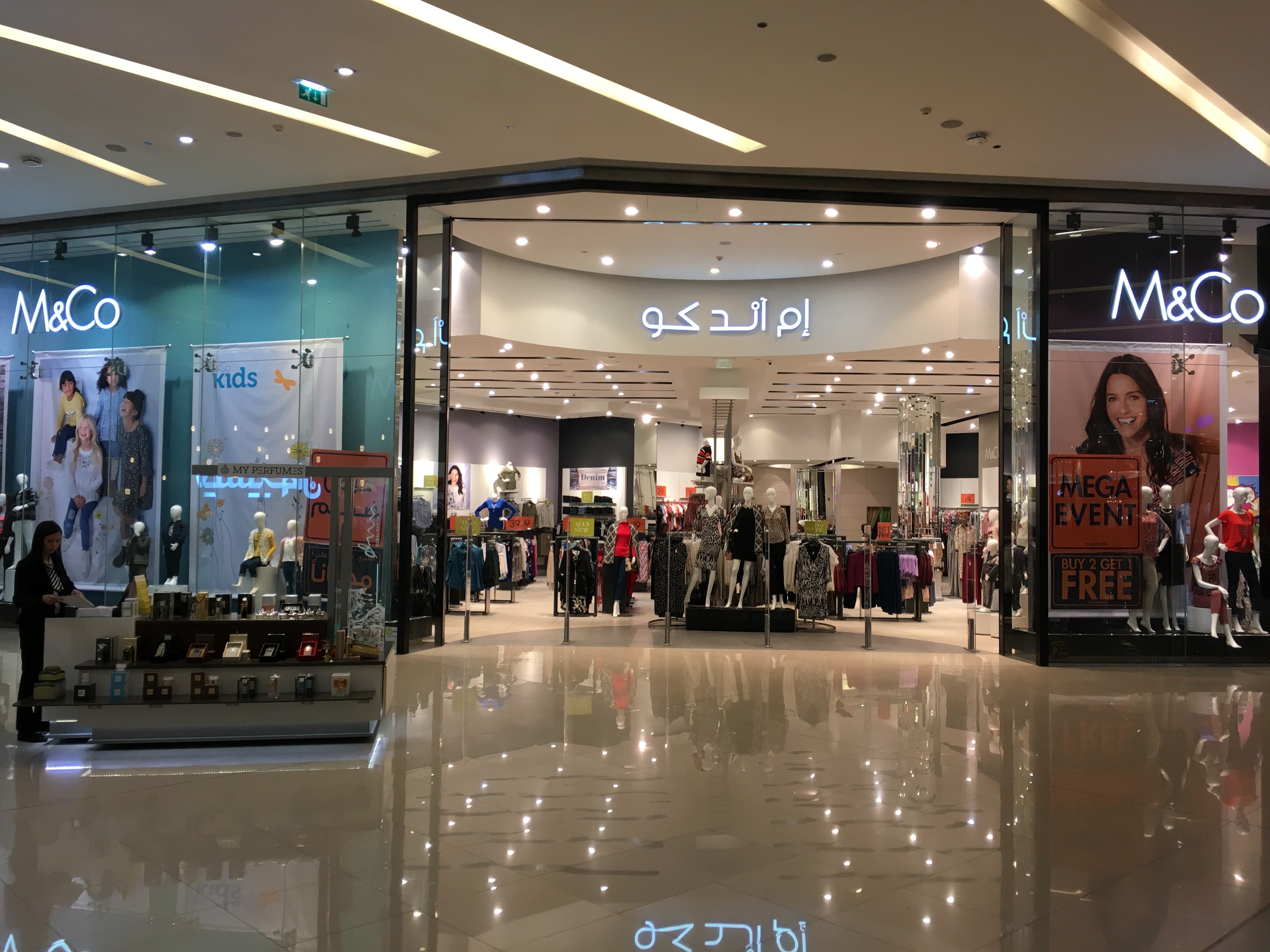
M&Co. Store Dubai Mall, UAE

In June 2020, during the COVID-19 pandemic in the United Kingdom, M&Co was reported to have sought new backers amid a slump in sales. Professional services firm Deloitte supported its hunt for new investors as the company explored sale options including a pre-pack administration. In December 2022, M&Co went into administration with Teneo Financial Advisory as administrators. On 6 February 2023, it was announced that M&Co would be closing all 170 stores in the spring of the same year, with the last of them closing by the end of April. In February 2023, it was announced that Yours Clothing Group had acquired the company, with Saeed Hatteea appointed as chairman and Andrew Killingsworth as chief executive officer.

== See also ==
- Impact of the COVID-19 pandemic on retail
