= McKinley High School (Louisiana) =

McKinley Senior High School

Location
- 800 East McKinley Street; Baton Rouge, Louisiana 70802; United States; 30°25′24″N 91°10′28″W

Information
- Type: Free public
- Established: 1907
- School district: East Baton Rouge Parish Public Schools
- Principal: Gregory Thompson
- Teaching staff: 61.93 (FTE)
- Grades: 9–12
- Enrollment: 827 (2023–2024)
- Student to teacher ratio: 13.35
- Campus type: Urban
- Colors: Blue and White
- Mascot: Panther
- Nickname: Panthers
- Yearbook: The Big 'M'
- Website: McKinley High

- McKinley High School
- U.S. National Register of Historic Places
- Historic 1926 building, now Alumni Center

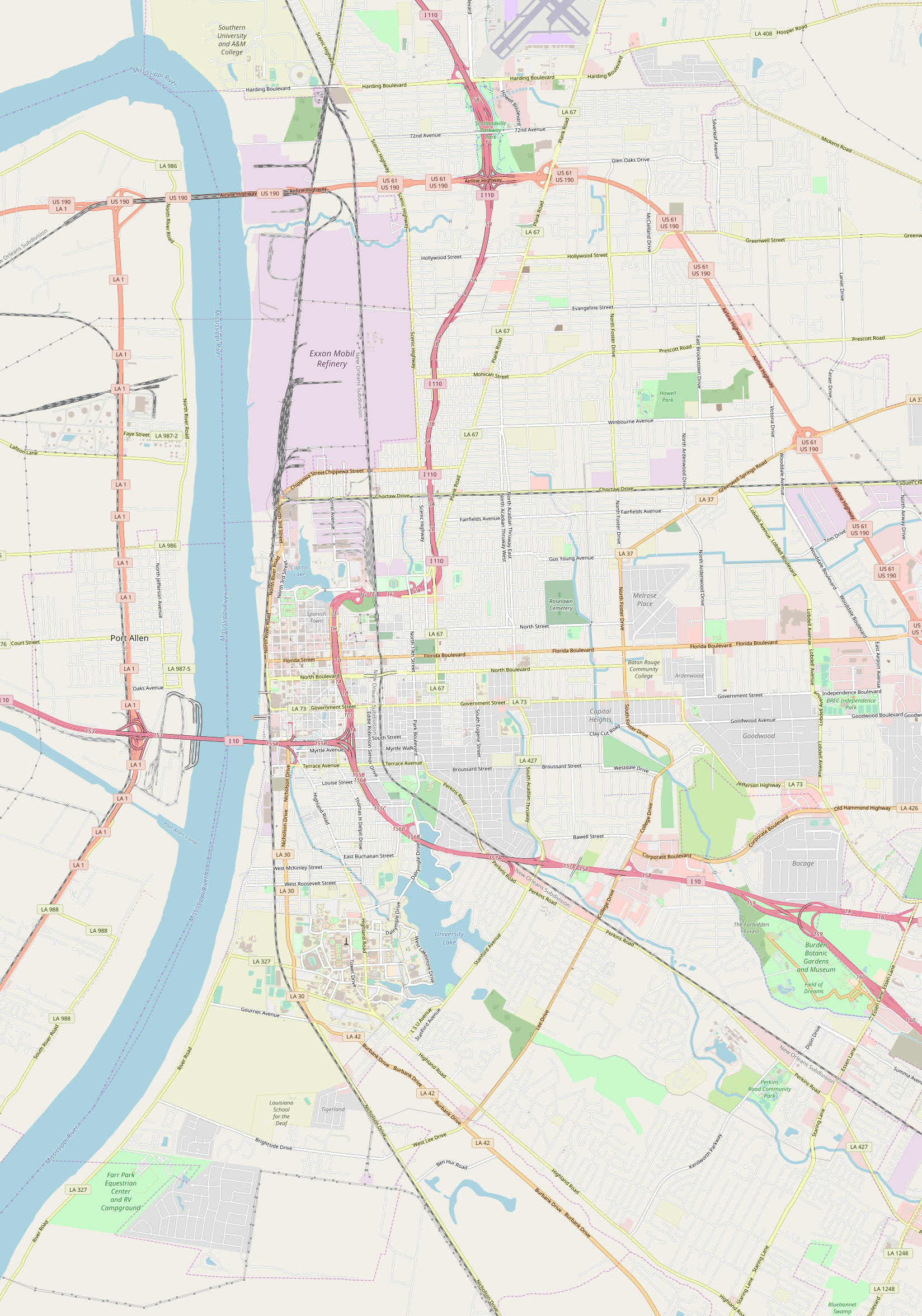
- Location within Baton Rouge
- Location: 1520 Thomas H. Delpit Drive; Baton Rouge, Louisiana
- Coordinates: 30°26′02″N 91°10′44″W
- Area: 1.5 acres (0.61 ha)
- Built: 1926
- Architects: Jones, Roessle & Olschner
- Architectural style: Romanesque
- NRHP reference No.: 81000292
- Added to NRHP: November 16, 1981

McKinley Senior High School, located in Baton Rouge, Louisiana, United States on 800 E. McKinley St., is home to the East Baton Rouge Parish School Board's first gifted and talented high school programs. The school mascot is a Panther and the school colors are royal blue and white. It was established as a school for African Americans. The original building, now an alumni center, was completed in 1926 and is listed on the National Register of Historic Places. Another former building became a junior high and then an elementary school.

== History ==
The forerunner of McKinley Senior High, was named the Hickory Street School, which was located several blocks east of the present site, in 1907–1908. The school outgrew the building, so the school was renamed The Baton Rouge Colored High School and moved to a new location.

The Baton Rouge Colored High School was located at the corner of Perkins Road and Bynum Street in 1913. This facility was later struck by lightning and destroyed.

McKinley was the first high school established for African Americans in East Baton Rouge Parish. McKinley's first graduating class was in 1916. The four students became the first African American high school graduates in Louisiana.

The original McKinley High School building was constructed in 1926 and opened in 1927, and was named in honor of the 25th President of the United States. The school opened September 19, 1927 on Texas Street, currently named Thomas H. Delpit Drive. Thomas H. Delpit was a restaurateur and his son served in the state legislature.

In 1950 the High School was moved to a new facility at the corner of Louise Street and McCalop Street, next to the present day I-10. The Thomas H. Delpit Drive facility became McKinley Junior High School.

In 1962, the third and present day McKinley Senior High School was built on East McKinley Street, the Junior High School was moved to the I-10 site, and the Thomas H. Delpit Drive site became McKinley Elementary.

The original 1926 McKinley Senior High School facility on Thomas H. Delpit Dr. was entered into the National Register of Historic Places on November 16, 1981, and was subsequently purchased by the Alumni Association from the East Baton Rouge Parish School Board on February 5, 1992. It is now being used by Alumni Association as the McKinley High School Alumni Center.

On January 14, 2016, President Barack Obama hosted a town hall at Mckinley High. This was the first time a sitting president hosted a town hall at a secondary school in Louisiana.

== Campus ==
The current campus sits in Old South Baton Rouge just to the northwest of the Louisiana State University campus, and is bordered by Lake Crest, one of the LSU lakes to the East. Facilities include five main buildings, many out buildings, football and baseball fields, tennis courts, track and field facilities, and a new black box theater which was built by students in 2006.

== Communities served ==
McKinley serves sections of Baton Rouge and half of the Gardere census-designated place.

== Academics ==
McKinley offers 23 Advanced Placement courses, and is one of Baton Rouge's two high schools with a Gifted and Talented program.

As of 2007 McKinley's high academics standards, it ranked among the best in the state. The students ranked 18th of all schools in Louisiana for the statewide average ACT score and 3rd in the state when comparing their Gifted and Talented program.

== Athletics ==
McKinley competes in the Louisiana High School Athletic Association (LHSAA) District 6 Class 4A. Their biggest rival is Scotlandville Magnet High School.

They compete in the following sports:

- Football
- Volleyball
- Boys and Girls Basketball
- Boys and Girls Soccer
- Tennis
- Golf
- Track and Cross Country
- Baseball
- Softball
- Bowling
- Wrestling
- Swimming

=== Athletic history ===
On 17 April 2018 the LHSAA fined the school $2,500 and placed all its athletic programs on probation for two calendar years after sanctions related to multiple sports during the 2017–18 year. Four coaches had their Louisiana High School Coaches Association card privileges revoked for one year. The four programs involved were the girls junior varsity basketball, girls soccer, boys track and volleyball programs. After further investigation found more than 150 eligibility and rules compliance infractions the fine was increased to nearly $42,000, the entire 2017–2018 coaching staff (both faculty and non-faculty) was banned from coaching at any LHSAA school for one year, the school was given a two-year playoff ban for all sports, and the school forfeited runner-up finishes in Division I girls basketball for 2017 and 2018.

=== Championships ===
Football championships

- (5) State Championships: 1926, 1927, 1929, 1942, 1954

== Notable alumni ==
- Donnie Ray Albert – Grammy Award-winning opera performer (Porgy and Bess)
- Jason Banks (born 1985) – former National Football League (NFL) football player for the Arizona Cardinals
- Pepper Bassett – former Major league baseball catcher with the Birmingham Black Barons.
- Hubert 'Rap' Brown – Radical leader of the 1960s - author of Die Nigger Die!.
- Isiah Carey- Emmy award-winning television journalist with KRIV Houston
- Don Chaney (born 1946) - former NBA great (Boston Celtics) and former head coach of New York Knicks, Houston Rockets, and Detroit Pistons.
- Cleo Fields - Louisiana State Senator and current United States Congressman
- Kevin Gates - rapper; owns Bread Winner Association (BWA)
- Tommie Green - former NBA player and former collegiate head basketball coach (Southern University)
- Buddy Guy – Five-time Grammy Award-winning blues guitarist whom Eric Clapton and music critics have called the greatest blues guitarist alive.
- Edward C. James - state representative for District 101 in East Baton Rouge Parish since 2012
- Chris Thomas King – Grammy Award-winning blues artist and actor (O Brother Where Art Thou?)
- Van Lathan – journalist, producer, podcaster, and political commentator
- Chenese Lewis – actress & plus-size model
- Lil Boosie (born 1982) – rapper
- Jerome Meyinsse (born 1988) – basketball player in the Israeli Basketball Premier League. Played college at University of Virginia.
- Calvin Nicholas - former wide receiver for San Francisco 49ers
- Tyrece Radford (born 1999) - basketball player in the Israeli Basketball Premier League
- Eddie G. Robinson – Hall of Fame former Grambling State University football coach
- Keith Smart - former Indiana basketball player, one-time head coach of Cleveland Cavaliers, Golden State Warriors, and Sacramento Kings. Current Assistant Coach of the NBA's Memphis Grizzlies.
- Omar Suleiman - Muslim Scholar, civil rights activist, public speaker and author.
- Gardner C. Taylor — Pastor Emeritus of Concord Baptist Church in Brooklyn, NY. Theologian, scholar, and teacher (Harvard and Yale), recipient of Presidential Medal of Freedom. Named America's Greatest Black Preacher (Ebony Magazine Poll, 1993)
- Tyrus Thomas - former LSU and NBA basketball player
- Lynn Whitfield – actress and producer
- Nemiah Wilson — former NFL All-pro defensive back and kick returner with Denver Broncos and Oakland Raiders 1965-75
- Herb Williams – former NFL defensive back for the San Francisco 49ers and the St. Louis Cardinals
- Joe Williams – former NFL football player

== See also ==
- National Register of Historic Places listings in East Baton Rouge Parish, Louisiana
