= Torrid Holdings =

American retail chain

Torrid Holdings Inc.
- Type: Public
- Traded as: NYSE: CURV
- Industry: Fashion
- Founded: April 2001; 25 years ago
- Headquarters: City of Industry, California, U.S.
- Number of locations: 658
- Key people: Lisa Harper, CEO
- Products: Plus-size clothing, gifts
- Revenue: US$ 1,288,100,000 (FY '22)
- Owner: Sycamore Partners
- Website: torrid.com

Torrid Holdings Inc. is an American women's retail chain formerly owned by Hot Topic. While it is still owned by Sycamore Partners, owners of Hot Topic, in 2015, the company branched off to become Torrid, LLC. The store offers plus-size clothing and accessories for women size 10-30. Torrid began operations in April 2001.

== History ==
Torrid opened its first story on April 18, 2001, in the Brea Mall in Brea, California, with plans to open additional stores in San Diego, Denver, Omaha, Boston, and Annapolis. In August 2015, the chain expanded internationally when it opened a store in Toronto, Canada.

Torrid initially filed an IPO in 2017, but ultimately chose to withdraw it. In 2018, the chain launched a lingerie collection alongside model Tara Lynn.

In July 2021, the company went public on the New York Stock Exchange, under the symbol CURV. It had 608 stores at the time.

By 2024, Torrid had over 650 stores in operation across all states in the United States and some regions of Canada. In June 2025, it was announced that Torrid would close 180 of its stores, roughly 30% of its retail footprint. Several factors ultimately prompted Torrid to move forward with this decision, including over half of its retail leases expiring this year, and Q1 2025 reports showed that over 60% of its sales were online. Store count was further reduced to 457 by September 2026.

== Products ==
The store's clothing styles are aimed at women. In 2005, Torrid expanded its merchandise selection to include styles distinct from its parent company, Hot Topic. Torrid sells accessories, shoes, jewelry, novelty tee shirts, fashion tops, pants, Capri pants, shorts, skirts, dresses, outerwear, intimate apparel, hosiery, gifts, and beauty products.

== Models ==
In February 2014, Georgina Burke was named the first face of Torrid and signed a one-year contract. In December 2014, Philomena Kwao was signed as a second face of Torrid.

In 2015, Torrid launched their first public casting call and model search, inviting customers to apply and audition to become the next face of Torrid. Over 14,000 people auditioned, with the winner being Lyanna Lynette. Torrid held model searches until 2019 and recently restarted it again in 2024 kicking off the model search in April 2024

Torrid held its first fashion show at New York Fashion Week in September 2017.
