= Katya Zharkova =

Belarusian plus-size model and actress (born 1981)

- Born: October 30, 1981 (age 44); Minsk, Belarus
- Occupation: Plus-size model
- Modelling information
- Height: 5 ft 10 in (1.78 m)
- Hair colour: Blonde
- Eye colour: Brown
- Agency: Wilhelmina Models; Brigitte Models
- Website: zharkova.com

Katya Zharkova (Belarusian: Кацярына Жаркова; born October 30, 1981) is a Belarusian plus-size model and actress.

== Career ==
Zharkova started modeling when she was 14 years old and is considered the first plus-size model of Belarus. Katya is known for her bare-skinned photo shoot by Plus Size Magazine with another skinny model to raise awareness for the young girls who lose confidence because of oversized body figures. She has appeared in and modeled for labels such as Forever 21, Silver Jeans and plus-size specialists Fashion To Figure.

In 2006, Zharkova was the first plus-size model to appear in Cosmopolitan Russia, in the November issue.

In 2013, Zharkova was selected as one of Plus Model Magazine's Women of the Year for 2013 as an advocate for woman's choice to be healthy and not to subside to society's standards.

Zharkova is managed by Wilhelmina Models and Brigitte Models.
