= Mary Duffy =

- Born: New York, New York, United States
- Education: Mt. Holyoke College
- Occupations: Author, speaker, spokeswoman, fashion expert, entrepreneur
- Known for: First petite/plus-size model agency

Mary Duffy is a feminist fashion expert, spokeswoman, entrepreneur, author, and motivational speaker who has worked to expand the concept of beauty for the majority of women who do not fit the ideal stereotypes popularized by the entertainment and fashion industries.

She expanded the first model agency specializing in plus-size models and petites. Her career has included multiple television appearances, fashion shows, seminars, and print media interviews, as well as two years each on QVC and HSN. She also had a ten-year plus-size pattern line for Simplicity Patterns, designed three other fashion lines, and authored several books.

== Professional background ==
After graduating from Mount Holyoke College, Duffy's career direction started in the mid-1970s when she became one of the first plus-size models. She liked the work so much she decided, in 1979, to buy a start-up agency from Beth Kramer in NYC, immediately adding Petites, creating Big Beauties/Little Women, the first agency in the world specializing in plus-size models and petites.

By 1984, Big Beauties/Little Women was successful enough to run national model searches advertised in the press. The prize included the cover of It's Me magazine, a nationally published magazine for plus-size women. In 1987, her first book, "The H-O-A-X Fashion Formula", was published. In 1988, she sold her company to Ford Models, where she became executive director for Special Sizes until 2010. Ford renamed the division Ford 12+, and then Ford+.

Duffy’s own career as a model included national campaigns for Gloria Vanderbilt, L'eggs, and Weight Watchers. In 1980, she began motivational speaking. In these lectures she advocates a message designed to enhance women's self-esteem. She has also commentated on more than 1250 fashion shows and seminars, and appeared on more than 800 television shows, including Today, Good Morning America, Sally Jesse Raphael, the Oprah Winfrey Show, Hard Copy, The Jenny Jones Show, and CNN. She has also done more than 600 print media interviews, including Cosmopolitan, Woman’s Day, Family Circle, Ladies Home Journal, New York Daily News, and New York Times.

In her books, shows, and interviews, she has espoused the messages "Mattel made Barbie, but God made us," and "God doesn’t make mistakes." Concerned with the media's unattainable image of "perfection" generated by much of the fashion industry, Duffy offers advice and options on fashion and beauty for women. She states a personal belief that any woman, no matter what her age, size, height, finances, or features can (and should) develop her own unique personal style. Her message is that it's not what you've got, how much of it, or how old it is, but what you do with it is what matters.

From 1991 to 1993, she appeared regularly on QVC. In 1993, she introduced a successful pattern line for Simplicity Patterns, a collection of large-sized patterns based on her H-O-A-X body shapes. From 1997 to 1999, she designed and presented a ready-to-wear clothing and accessory line for The Home Shopping Network, called "Personality" by Mary Duffy. The line was based on her theory that there are four distinct fashion personalities, which are defined by individual motivation: The Classic who dresses to be appropriate; The Dramatic who dresses to be noticed; The Casual who dresses to be comfortable; and The Artistic who dresses to be unique.

== Personal ==
Born in New York and raised in New England, Duffy lives in Manhattan where she is a member of The Junior League and The Fashion Group. Since retiring from Ford Models in 2010, she has started a company to inform and encourage the self-esteem interests of all women, called Fashion 4 the Rest of Us. Besides "The H-O-A-X Fashion Formula", she has written two other books, "The Complete Petite", and "The MakeOver". She has also co-authored and self-published two more books with her husband, Marc Guerrero, a book of short stories, "East of Tiffany’s", and a book on advanced writing techniques, "Toolbox for Writers".
