= Plus-size model =

Type of model

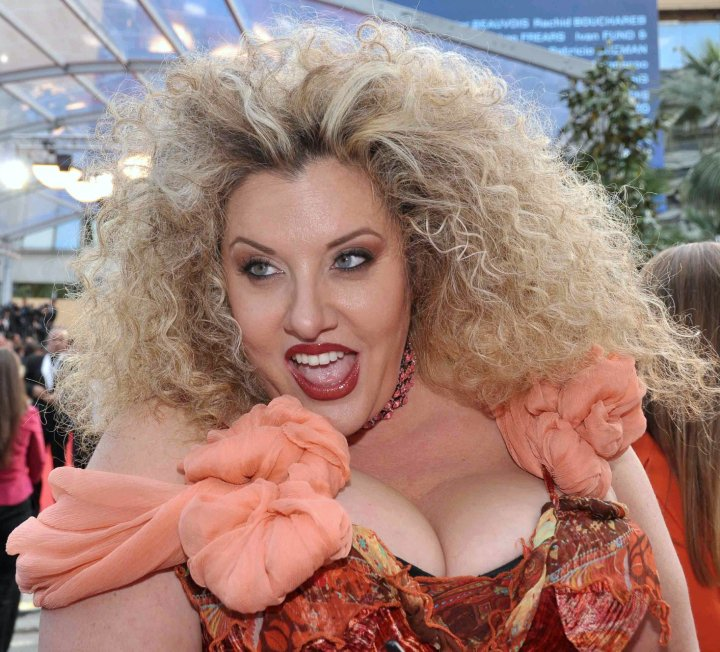
Velvet D'Amour, model for John Galliano, then muse of Jean-Paul Gaultier, at the 2010 Cannes Film Festival.

A plus-size model is an individual size 12 and above who is engaged primarily in modeling plus-size clothing. Plus-size clothing worn by plus-size models is typically catering for and marketed to either big, tall or overweight men and women. Plus-size models also engage in work that is not strictly related to selling clothing, e.g., stock photography and advertising photography for cosmetics, household and pharmaceutical products and sunglasses, footwear and watches. Therefore, plus-size models do not exclusively wear garments marketed as plus-size clothing. This is especially true when participating in fashion editorials for mainstream fashion magazines.

Synonymous and interchangeable with plus-size model is "full-figured model", "extended-sizes model", "over-weight model", "fat model" and "outsize model". Previously, the term "large size model" was also frequently used.

== Plus-size industry ==
Fashion designers are starting to look more closely at the earning potential from plus-size clothing, and have used plus-size models for their advertising campaigns and catwalks. Jean-Paul Gaultier and John Galliano both used plus-size models in their Spring 2006 showings in Paris. Gaultier also used plus-size models Marquita Pring and Crystal Renn in his Spring 2011 Ready-to-Wear show. Italian plus-size fashion house Elena Mirò regularly stages biannual prêt-à-porter shows during Milan Fashion Week. Mark Fast and William Tempest each used plus-size models during their own London Fashion Week showings for Spring 2009, and again as part of All Walks Beyond the Catwalk event held on 19 September 2009 in association with the British Fashion Council. Mark Fast also used plus-size models in Fall 2010, Fall 2011, and Spring 2012. Mr. Debonair of Beautiful You Fashion Tour uses plus-size models in shows around the world, including during the Beautiful You fashion show during New York Fashion Week 2022 which included Ms. Plus Intercontinental 2021 title holder Wendy Roach. Plus-size models became increasingly represented in high fashion after 2020 but saw a decline in early 2023 when ultrathin models made a comeback.

=== Origins in North America ===
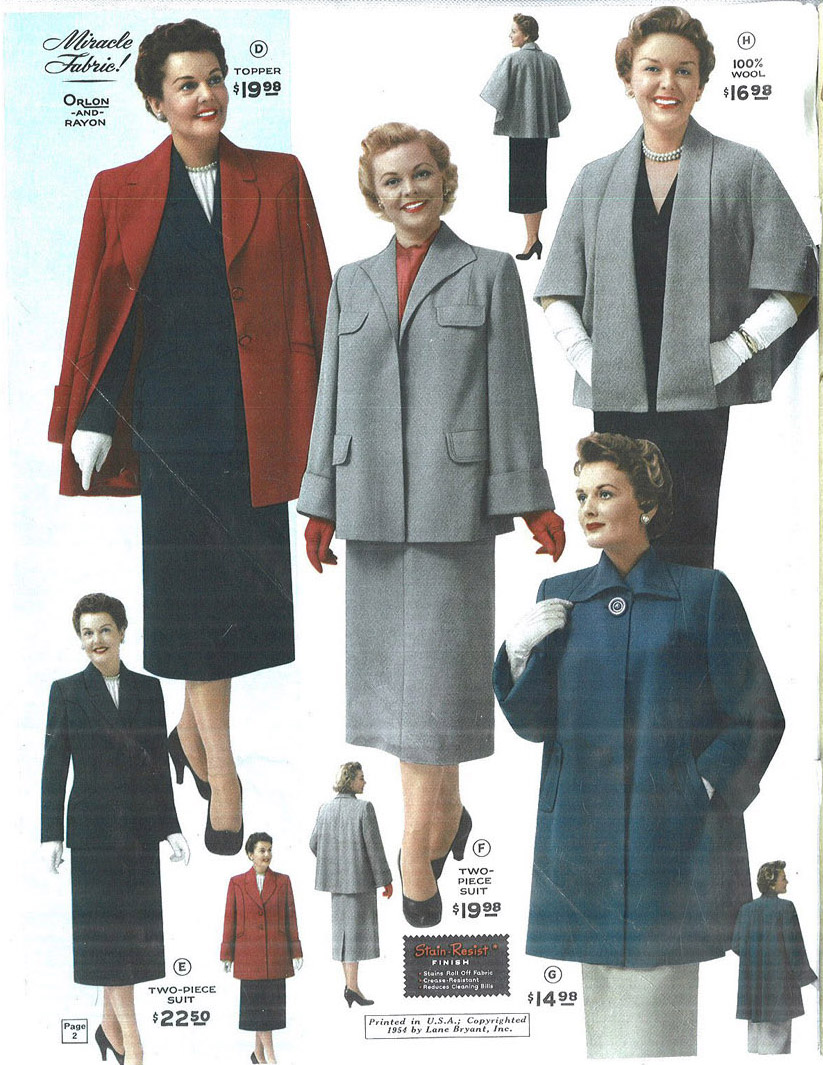
A page from the Lane Bryant Spring/Summer 1954 catalog.

Lane Bryant began trading in the early 1900s as a producer of clothing for "Expectant Mothers and Newborn"'. By the early 1920s, Lane Bryant started selling clothing under the category 'For the Stout Women', which ranged between a 38–56 inch bustline. The earliest catalogs used illustrations to sell their products, but by the mid-1950s photographs were integrated into the catalogs as the evolution of printing technology made this option available. After a hiatus through the 1960–1980 period, Lane Bryant again began using plus-size models.

=== Specialty model agency divisions ===
Plus size models were first represented by model agencies in the 1970s. Prior to this, models freelanced directly with retailers, designers and magazines. Former plus-size model Mary Duffy owned Big Beauties Little Women, the first agency specializing in plus-size and petite models in 1977. Pat Swift, a plus-size model at the time, founded Plus Models in 1978. Ford Models began representing plus size models in 1978, and added two models to their board, including top model Ann Harper, due to demand from clients. By the late 1980s, Plus Models was the largest and most successful plus-size specialty agency, representing over 65 models and grossing over 2 million dollars in revenue. By 1984, Big Beauties Little Women was successful enough to run national model searches advertised in the press. 18-year old Angelia Taylor was the first winner of the inaugural Big Beauty Model Search in 1984. The prize included the cover of It's Me magazine, a nationally published magazine for plus-size women. Not long after, Plus Models began holding national model searches. By the mid-1980s, top plus size models could earn as much as 150,000 to 200,000 dollars a year. Ford Models bought Big Beauties Little Women in 1988, later renaming the division Special Sizes and then Ford 12+.

Wilhelmina NYC agent Susan Georget started the Wilhelmina 10/20 division in New York in 1994, recently re-branded W Curve. Gary Dakin headed New York's Karin Models' Curves division, only to leave after a short time to develop Ford Models' Ford 12+(rebranded Ford+) model division in their New York office in 1998. In Constantine Valhouli's 2001 plus-size model documentary Curve, Dakin states, "We're celebrating our 25th anniversary of the Ford 12+ division. It was the first and longest-existing plus division in the industry."(sic) Together, these agents created agency divisions that have continued to recruit the highest caliber of models in the industry and are credited with expanding opportunities for plus-size models beyond working solely for plus-size clothing retailers.

Former plus-size model Becca Thorpe founded the plus-size division at Muse Model Management, a boutique fashion agency in 2011. Muse also recruits high caliber models and had advanced opportunities for plus-size models beyond advertising for plus-size retailers.

Ford Models closed its plus-size division in June 2013 to focus on its editorial divisions. Gary Dakin and Jaclyn Sarka founded Jag Models in July 2013, which represents about 30 models sizes 8-18. The agency does not brand its models as plus-size.

There are a large number of reputable agencies throughout the U.S. and Canada, and internationally in Australia, Belgium, Brazil, Czech Republic, Denmark, France, Germany, Ireland, Italy, South Africa, Spain, Switzerland, The Netherlands, Turkey and the UK.

=== Specialty media and other ventures in North America ===
In 1979 Big Beautiful Woman magazine (more commonly known via the acronym BBW) began publication and was one of the first publications in the US catering specifically to plus-size clothing consumers. It ceased publication in 1995, but the "BBW" brand was sold onwards. Although it continued in print via several editor-and-publisher combinations it continued to falter, finally ceasing print publication after 23 years with the April/May 2003 issue. BBW became an online community surrounding archived material from the magazine.

In Spring 1981, Lane Bryant began publishing It's Me magazine. Along with Big Beautiful Woman, It's Me was one of the few print magazines for plus-size women. In 1982, the magazine was sold to Happy Hands Publishing Company.

In addition to magazines, books dedicated to plus size (aka "full figured") fashion and lifestyles began to be released from major publishers in the 1980s. Some of these include: Making It Big (1980), The Big Beauty Book (1982), The Lane Bryant Fashion Math Make-Over (1987) and Sizing Up (1989).

Spiegel catalog launched their For You from Spiegel plus-size collection in 1989 with Linda Arroz as their official consultant and spokesmodel. The three-year For You campaign included opening brick-and-mortar retail locations in upscale shopping centers. Previously, Spiegel had only been a mail-order merchant. As part of the full-scale plus-size outreach, Spiegel produced fashion videos that featured advice from image consultant Arroz, with commentary from some of the plus-size models who appeared in the video and catalog. Arroz became the fashion editor of BBW magazine after her stint with Spiegel. By the mid-1990s, all For You from Spiegel retail locations had closed.

In 1995, Lane Bryant began a transformation of the brand which included large-scale fashion showings and celebrity endorsement. Queen Latifah, Mia Tyler, Camryn Manheim, Anna Nicole Smith and Chris Noth have appeared in advertising and/or events on behalf of the brand. Lane Bryant held a large-scale lingerie fashion show to launch the "Cacique Intimates" lingerie collection on 1 February 2000. The 2003 final large-scale catwalk show featured Roseanne Barr as Matron of Ceremonies in a cabaret setting complete with Moulin Rouge-style singers and dancers.

Lane Bryant was acquired by Charming Shoppes for $335 million in August 2001. In 2003 a cost-reduction plan was announced to improve the company's pre-tax position by $45 million. Shortly afterwards, the annual Lane Bryant fashion show ceased production.

With strong cooperation from Wilhelmina 10/20, Curves and Ford 12+ agencies, MODE magazine, was launched in the spring of 1997. No other fashion magazine specifically targeted the plus-size consumer with a Vogue-like fashion philosophy. MODE's editorial practice of providing models' names, sometimes attached to quotes on self-esteem to make them more approachable, greatly aided the popularity of the models and gave them a form of celebrity. The magazine also received industry acclaim, being named the best new magazine launch by Ad Week and Advertising Age in 1997. MODE ran model search competitions in conjunction with the Wilhelmina modeling agency, drawing entries from thousands of hopefuls from the US and Canada.

Occurring shortly before the time of MODE's closure was the failure of several designers' ventures into the plus-size market. Versace (GV Versatile Couture), Valentino (Carisma), and others ceased producing the clothing which MODE relied upon, leaving an unfortunate deficit in the fashion department wardrobes and advertising revenue coffers of MODE magazine and its successors. Its circulation was approximately 600,000 at the time of its demise in late 2001.

Grace Magazine was launched on 14 May 2002 by MODE magazine's last executive editor, Ceslie Armstrong, and many of the ex-MODE staff as an independent quarterly publication and website under a similar concept. Even though the initial 400,000 print run sold out quickly and advertising revenue appeared high, the independent status and limited funding prohibited the ability to grow to fill the newsstand and subscription orders. Critics, however, believed that Grace featured far less stylish fashion content than its predecessor and unwisely pursued an editorial emphasis on weight-related health issues. Grace Magazine ceased operation due to lack of funding in November 2003, after publishing 10 issues.

Charming Shoppes' custom advertorial magazine, Figure, was launched in 2002 and was revamped during 2006. Although it featured only Charming Shoppes' own products and related lifestyle articles, it remained the only fashion and lifestyle print magazine specifically targeted for plus-size consumers until its announced closure after the publication of the March/April 2009 issue.

American television program America's Next Top Model has featured contestants acknowledging the plus-size industry's relevance to fashion since the show's launch in 2003. After elimination from the competition several of the contestants have signed contracts with the Wilhelmina agency, although only Kortnie Coles, Diane Hernandez, Toccara Jones, Whitney Thompson, Yvonne Powless, Khrystyana Kazakova, Liz Woodbury, and Alexandra Underwood have successfully translated their TV celebrity into ongoing modeling careers.

Several homegrown calendar projects featuring models over a U.S. size 12 were launched in 2007, including the well-publicized Luscious and Fenomenal Calendar products from North America. So far, no calendar has been successful enough to continue beyond its initial launch year.

Plus Model Magazine, an online publication was launched in 2006 by Madeline Figueroa-Jones, a former plus-size model. The magazine features beauty and fashion editorials, beauty and fashion tips, modeling advice and interviews with plus-size celebrities as well as people working in all facets of the plus-size clothing industry. Plus Model Magazine launched an online podcast in 2008 hosted by model, actress and host Chenese Lewis, which has interviews with plus-size celebrities and people working in all facets of the plus-size clothing industry. The magazine gained attention in many media outlets worldwide by publishing an editorial commenting on body image and the fashion industry. The editorial featured plus-size model Katya Zharkova photographed nude alongside a straight-size model.

Canadian magazine LOU LOU has included specifically produced bi-annual plus-size fashion inserts featuring editorials and product pages since 2008. Echoing the advertorial relationship of Figure to Lane Bryant, LouLou's supplement features products from Reitmans group of plus-size apparel companies (Addition-Elle, MXM, Pennington's) on its pages.

Vogue U.S. has faltered on the continued use of recognisable plus-size models for the annual "Shape Issue" (April) issue; however British vocalist Adele appeared on the March 2012 cover as the first overtly larger-sized cover subject since sportsman LeBron James in April 2008. U.S. Glamour has declared it will feature more plus-size models as editorial policy after the appearance of a small photograph of model Lizzie Miller caused a groundswell of positive comment.

Elle Quebec featured plus-size models three times on its cover: in May 1997, May 2013 and June 2014.

High fashion print publication V magazine featured seven agency-represented plus-size models in "The Size Issue" #63, photographed by prominent fashion photographers.

North American body care company, Dove, launched a "Real Beauty Campaign" where they included un-retouched photos of plus-size models, and models of all sizes, to emphasize the acceptance of all body shapes.

=== Origins in Europe ===
European magazines, including European editions of Elle and Vogue have featured plus size models on covers and in editorials.

In France, the media ma grande taille is dedicated to plus size industry and body positivity.

Evans, a U.K.-based retailer, was founded in 1930. Evans specializes in plus-sized clothing, lingerie, shoes and swimwear.

Max Mara started Marina Rinaldi, one of the first high-end clothing lines for plus-size women in 1980. Marina Rinaldi began advertising in 1981. The line's campaigns were photographed by top photographers such as Richard Avedon, Patrick Demarchelier, Arthur Elgort, Greg Kadel, Peter Lindbergh, and Craig McDean, used top models and celebrities(including Carré Otis, Candice Huffine, Crystal Renn, and Kate Dillon Levin), and were featured in magazines and on billboards. The ads were also the first to use the term plus size rather than outsize in Europe.

=== Specialty model agency divisions ===
Cheryl Hughes founded Hughes models, the UK's first plus-size agency in 1985. Allison Bramwell Bewley, a former straight size and plus-size model founded Excel Models in 1995. The agency has represented models such as Pollyanna McIntosh and Sara Morrison. Sarah Watkinson founded 12 + models in 2000. Former plus-size model Anna Shillinglaw founded the plus size division of Milk Management in 2011. These agents have been credited with improving visibility of plus-size models in Europe and developing some of the top plus-size models for international markets. In recent years, the most prestigious fashion agencies in the UK have launched plus size divisions. In 2011, Excel Models merged with Models 1, one of Europe's most prestigious fashion agencies. Storm Models started a plus size division, Curve in 2012.

=== Specialty media and other ventures in Europe ===
Several plus-size retailers in Europe have produced magazines. Marina Rinaldi started MR, a fashion magazine showing Marina Rinaldi fashions on plus-size models in 1992. The magazine is still in publication. Evans, one of the UK's largest plus-size specialist retailers, launched Encore, an in-store fashion and lifestyle magazine published by Condé Nast in 1996.

Yes!, a print fashion magazine for plus size women founded and edited by Janice Bhend, launched in 1993. At the time, Yes! was the only print magazine especially for plus size women in Europe. The magazine halted publication in 1998 due to lack of funding.

Fashion editor Rivkie Baum launched SLiNK, a fashion and lifestyle magazine for full-figured women in 2011. SLiNK is one of the few magazines focused on plus size women to photograph models with a Vogue-like aesthetic. The magazine began publishing in print for its fifth issue in March 2012. The magazine was the first to feature a plus size model in a 3D editorial. SLiNK was also one of the few magazines to feature plus-size and smaller sized models on a magazine cover.

European versions of Vogue and Elle have featured plus size models in many editorials, often photographed by top photographers. In 1997, British Vogue published an editorial with Sara Morrison photographed by Nick Knight. Vogue Italia featured plus size models on the cover of three issues. Sophie Dahl appeared on two covers in 2000(February and April). In June 2011, Candice Huffine, Robyn Lawley, and Tara Lynn appeared on the magazine's cover. The main editorial of the issue featured those three models plus Marquita Pring. Robyn Lawley also appeared in another editorial in that issue. Elle France has featured Tara Lynn on two covers in April 2010 and April 2012, and Robyn Lawley on their April 2011 cover. The April 2010 issue also included a 20-page spread with Lynn. Elle Italia has featured Crystal Renn on its April 2008 cover. Elle Belgium featured Deborah Dauchot on its May 2012 cover. In November 2013, Tara Lynn appeared on the cover of Elle Spain. In December 2013, Iris Monroe Baker appeared on the cover of Elle Netherlands.

Other magazines that have featured plus size models on their covers include Amica, Avantgarde, Biba, D Reppublicca della Donna, i-D, and S Moda. In addition, magazines such as Bon, Diva e Donna, Gioia, Glamour UK, Glass, Grazia, Numéro, Paradis, Ponystep, and Yo Dona have featured plus size models in editorials.

Britain & Ireland's Next Top Model has featured several contestants, including Louise Watts, who was Season 3's runner up and competed in America's Next Top Model Cycle 18.

In 2016, Scandinavia's Next Top Model was rebooted as Top Model Curves, and all contestants featured were plus-size models from Denmark, Norway, and Sweden. Swede Ronja Manfredsson was declared the winner during the finale episode in Lisbon.

=== Origins in Asia and the Pacific ===
The plus size industry in Asia is not as developed as in North America or Europe, but a number of Asian plus size models have been featured in press. Australia has an industry with multiple designers and retailers using plus size models in advertising. Plus size agencies in Australia have launched the careers of several international plus size models, such as Robyn Lawley.

=== Specialty agencies and divisions ===
Former plus-size model Darrianne Donnelly founded the first plus size agency in Australia, BigGals Models, which was renamed to BGM Models in 1996. BGM Models closed in 2015 at Donnelly's retirement, with the majority of models moving to the new Curves division at the established full service agency Vivien's Models. Chelsea Bonner, a former BGM model, left the agency to start Bella Models in 2000 in direct competition. Bonner is often credited with the discovery of Robyn Lawley as a model, although Lawley had already been modelling at a smaller size before joining Bella.

=== Specialty media and other ventures in Asia and Pacific Region ===
In April 1997, Emme appeared on a cover of New Woman, the first appearance of a plus-size model on an Australian magazine cover. In May 2000, Australian Cosmopolitan began using plus-size models in fashion feature spreads. Natalie Wakeling appeared in the first May 2000 editorial. Australian Cosmopolitan features plus size models in every issue of the magazine. Other magazines that regularly feature plus-size models include Australian Women's Weekly and Dolly. Robyn Lawley was GQ Australia's Girl of the Week in its November 2013 issue.

Madison magazine photographed Robyn Lawley for their May 2012 cover. In March 2014, Robyn Lawley appeared on the cover of Cosmopolitan Australia.

Crystal Renn appeared in A Call for Camp in Vogue Japan's June 2011 issue. Felicity Hayward was featured in the editorial I'm Better in Black in Vogue Japan September 2012. Australian Vogue featured Robyn Lawley in Belle Curve for their August 2011 issue, and again in their June 2013 issue.

Australia's Next Top Model featured cycle winner Tahnee Atkinson in Cycle 5.

Elena Miro produced a prêt-à-porter runway show in China featuring Asian models in 2006.

== Criticism ==
The plus-size modelling industry has received general criticism on the premise that acceptance of plus-size models sets a poor health example of weight management.

Consumer-based criticism regarding the lower sizes of plus-size models was for a long time commonplace and wide-spread. While the reputed 'average' dress size of an American woman is size 14, the majority of models represented as plus-size were between a US size 6-12; therefore, the models did not reflect the average consumer size. However, over the past ten years, larger plus-size models have appeared, particularly on social media, and Tess Holliday (US size 22, UK size 26) was featured on the September 2018 cover of Cosmopolitan.

Like other models, plus-size models use food tricks to temporarily alter their size long enough to meet client demands, such as eating salty food to go up in size or eating cotton balls dipped in juice to shrink for a shoot. Agents have suggested plastic surgery to some models.

German fashion designer Karl Lagerfeld and other fashion designers have deferred on the use of plus-size models through a lack of interest in the consumers associated with the term plus-size. Lagerfeld in particular has been vocal on the matter of his preferred clientele: "What I designed was fashion for slender and slim people" and received criticism for demanding that mass retailer H&M not produce their collaboration designs to size 16.

In the past, the industry was criticized for lacking racial diversity. For example, critics have noted that there are few Asian plus-size models. Others have noted that there are few black plus-size models with darker skin tones.

In February 2015, Australian model Stefania Ferrario and television presenter Ajay Rochester began a campaign to end the use of the term "plus-size" to describe models who are above a US dress size 4 by the modelling industry. Ferrario posted a picture with the caption "I am a model FULL STOP" with the hashtag "#droptheplus" which gained coverage in the media and was heavily discussed, with mixed, but mostly positive reactions, on social media and within the fashion industry.

== See also ==
- Plus-size clothing
