= Saeed Hatteea =

Businessman and former first-class cricketer (born 1950)

- Born: Saeed Ahmed Hatteea; 2 February 1950 (age 76); Bombay, Bombay State
- Education: City of London School
- Occupations: Businessman; Chairman
- Cricket career

Cricket information
- Batting: Right-handed
- Bowling: Right-arm fast-medium

Domestic team information
- Years: Team
- 1969/70-1970/71: Bombay
- 1972: Oxfordshire

Career statistics
Competition	First-class	List A
Matches	8	1
Runs scored	1	6
Batting average	0.20	–
100s/50s	0/0	0/0
Top score	7	6*
Balls bowled	1,392	56
Wickets	27	4
Bowling average	28.29	8.00
5 wickets in innings	1	0
10 wickets in match	0	0
Best bowling	5/33	4/32
Catches/stumpings	6/–	0/–
- Source: CricketArchive, 19 May 2011

Saeed Ahmed Hatteea (born 2 February 1950) is an international businessman and former first-class cricketer. He has held senior positions, including CEO of NDS Shanghai and Ciro Citterio, and Chairman of the multinational retail group Yours Clothing and M&Co. In cricket, he was a right-arm fast-medium bowler and a right-handed batsman.

== Early life and education ==
Born in Bombay, in 1962 he moved with his family to London, where he was educated at the City of London School and developed an interest in cricket. As a pace bowler, he represented English Schools, Surrey Cricketers, and MCC Schools at Lord's.

== Cricket career ==
Having played several matches for England schools and one Second XI Championship match for Warwickshire in 1969, upon completing his education, he was invited by chief chairman of selectors, Vijay Merchant, to play in India. He made his first-class debut for Bombay against Saurashtra in the 1969–70 Ranji Trophy. He played three further first-class matches for Bombay that season alongside Sunil Gavaskar, and was considered among those in contention for selection for the national team's tour of the West Indies, though did not feature in the final squad.

Hatteea returned to England for the 1970 season, playing second XI cricket for Gloucestershire. He also turned out for a Rest of the World XI against TN Pearce's XI in England that September, taking the catch to dismiss Sir Geoffrey Boycott. Later that year, he played two further matches for Bombay, and made a single appearance for West Zone against South Zone, in the 1970–71 Duleep Trophy semi-final. His only five-wicket haul came against Gujarat for Bombay. Across his eight first-class matches, he took 27 wickets at an average of 28.29.

In 1972, Hatteea played minor counties cricket for Oxfordshire, making appearances in three Minor Counties Championships. That same year, he featured in his only List A match during the Gillette Cup against Durham, taking 4/32 from 9.2 overs and scoring an unbeaten 6 runs. He has remained active in sport, particularly cricket and fives, and is a member of The Hurlingham Club.

== Business career ==
Hatteea held several senior executive positions at Marks & Spencer in the United States. In 1994, he was appointed as chief merchandising officer of Kingfisher Woolworths. Three years later, he became chief executive officer of NDS Shanghai, overseeing operations during a period of rapid economic expansion in China. In 2003, he was appointed chief executive officer of Ciro Citterio. In 2013, he became chairman of the UK-headquartered multinational retail group Yours Clothing, and later its subsidiary, M&Co.
