= Evans (retailer) =

British women's clothing retailer

- Type: Private
- Founded: 1930; 96 years ago
- Headquarters: United Kingdom
- Number of locations: 300+ stores
- Area served: Worldwide
- Key people: A. R. Killingsworth (CEO); Saeed Hatteea (Chairman)
- Revenue: ▲£26 million (2020)
- Owner: Arcadia Group (previous); City Chic Collective (previous); Yours Clothing Group (current)
- Website: evans.co.uk

Evans is a British online women's clothing retailer operated in the United Kingdom by Yours Clothing. It sells plus-size clothing, lingerie, wide-fitting shoes, swimwear and accessories.

== History ==
Evans was founded in 1930 by the manufacturer Jack Green. After 40 years as a limited company, the Burton Group (later Arcadia Group) acquired Evans and it became a public company. Mail order purchases were introduced in 1972, just after Evans had expanded to over 77 branches nationwide.

In 1988, Evans became the market leader in womenswear above a UK size 14. In 1994, the first Evans brochure featured in Good Housekeeping and Prima magazines, consisting of just 12 pages.

In 1997, Evans launched SeVen, a more fashion-led label for the younger customers and also became the first Arcadia brand to start selling online. In 1998, Helen Teague and her comedian partner Dawn French launched the 1647 range, exclusively designed for Evans.

In 2007, Crystal Renn became the official face of Evans, featuring in the first TV advertising campaign and all in-store merchandising.

In 2009, Beth Ditto of the indie rock band the Gossip launched the Beth Ditto at Evans collection, also exclusive to the retailer. In 2011, launched in USA and started providing delivery services to over 100 countries.

Evans' parent company Arcadia entered administration in November 2020. The following month, Australian fashion retailer City Chic Collective reached an agreement with Arcadia's administrators to purchase the Evans brand, website and wholesale business for £23 million. The deal did not include the retailer's stores. City Chic sold Evans in 2023 to Yours Clothing Group, which also owns Long Tall Sally and M&Co.

== Designers at Evans ==
Beth Ditto, in collaboration with head of design Lisa Marie Peacock, launched her first plus-size clothing collection for Evans on 9 July 2009. Ditto provided sketches and drew inspiration from her favourite vintage and charity shop clothes as well as bands like Blondie, The Slits and Grace Jones, and Art Deco movements. Some of the most popular items in the first collection included a domino-print dress and leggings, a stained glass-effect printed dress and a royal blue jumpsuit, as well as a biker jacket, denim pencil skirt and more. Her second collection for Evans launched in 2010 with just over 20 individual items. Marianne Kirby, writing in The Guardian, said the "collection struck a nerve with its iconic pieces" and that it was an "international success".

In 2012, British couture label Clements Ribeiro introduced the Swan range for Evans. The range proved popular: Adele wore a dress at a gig in Canada and was reported to have bought the whole range.
