= Tara Lynn =

American model (born 1982)

- Born: July 26, 1982 (age 44); Tacoma, Washington, U.S.
- Occupation: Model
- Modeling information
- Height: 175 cm (5 ft 9 in)
- Agency: IMG Models (New York, Paris, Milan, London, Sydney); Francina Models (Barcelona); Heffner Management (Seattle)

Tara Lynn (born July 26, 1982) is an American plus-size model. She is best known as a lingerie model for plus-size clothing.

== Early life ==
Lynn was born on July 26, 1982, in Tacoma, Washington, where she grew up.

== Career ==
Lynn drew attention in the fashion world after being featured in V and in the French Elle's plus-size fashion shoot. She has also appeared on the cover of the June 2011 Vogue Italia on the Spanish July 2010 XL-Semanal, in Elle-Québec and in Time magazine in 2010. She has also been featured Glamour. She appeared on the covers of various issues of Lucky Fall Jeans' promotional magazine.

Lynn has appeared in advertisings for H&M.

When Lynn was the covergirl for Elle, the picture was accompanied by the tagline 'The Body' implying that hers is the shape women should aspire to – rather than a slim figure. Since then, Lynn has become one of the faces of plus-size modelling. In an interview she admitted to being bullied at as a teenager: 'I was a size 14/16 (UK size 18 – 20) in high school, and it wasn't the easiest thing. (...) As a 16, I definitely felt like my weight was holding me back. I was supposed to have these bones protruding from my body and clearly that's not the case, and not the way my body's meant to be."
