= Plus-size clothing =

Type of clothing

Plus-size clothing is clothing proportioned specifically for people above the average clothing size. The application of the term varies from country to country, and according to which industry the person is involved in. (Note: As sizes vary from country to country, the reported starting point for plus sizes varies. For example, in the UK the starting point is size 10, the equivalent sizes are 14W (United States), 42 (France), 40 (Germany) and 16 (Australia).)

According to PLUS Model magazine, "In the fashion industry, plus size is identified as sizes 18 and over, or sizes 1X-6X and extended size as 7X and up". The article continues "Susan Barone [...] shared, 'Plus sizes are sizes 14W – 24W. Super sizes and extended sizes are used interchangeably for sizes 26W and above. Sometimes the size 26W is included in plus size'."

Such clothing has also been called outsize in Britain, a term that has been losing favor. One example of this is the renaming of "Evans Outsize" to simply "Evans", as well as losing their advertising slogan "Evans – The Outsize Shop", which also featured on their clothing labels. A related term for men's plus-size clothing is big and tall (a phrase also used as a trademark in some countries).

== History ==
Lena Himmelstein Bryant, a New York City-based seamstress who would go on to found Lane Bryant, began trading in the early 1900s as a producer of clothing for "Expectant Mothers and Newborn"'. By 1911, Lane Bryant was selling clothing under the category 'For the Stout Women', which ranged between a 38-56 inch bustline. Evans, a UK-based plus-size retailer, was founded in 1930. In the 1920s, small boys' clothing store, Brody's in Oak Park, Michigan, (now Bloomfield) started the "Husky" size clothing.

The large-size fashion revolution of 1977–1998 in the US began after the Fashion Group of NYC released a study predicting the demise of the Baby Boomer Junior Market, as the Boomers were coming of age. Mary Duffy's Big Beauties was the first model agency to work with hundreds of new plus-size clothing lines and advertisers. For two decades, this plus-size category produced the largest per annum percentage increases in ready-to-wear retailing.

Max Mara started Marina Rinaldi, one of the first high-end clothing lines, for plus-size women in 1980.

The first plus-size fashion line to show at Mercedes Benz Fashion Week was Cabiria, featured in the Fashion Law Institute fashion show in the tents at Lincoln Center on September 6, 2013.

On February 6, 2019, luxury e-tailer 11 Honoré, which sells designer clothing in sizes 12 to 24, opened New York Fashion Week with a fashion show focused on size inclusivity. The runway show featured looks from Christian Siriano, Prabal Gurung, Cushnie and Brandon Maxwell. Actress Laverne Cox closed the show wearing a custom dress by designer Zac Posen.

In June 2024, a Fashion Nova campaign promoted as body-positive faced significant backlash for its lack of body diversity. Critics on Instagram highlighted that the campaign predominantly featured models with flat stomachs and hourglass figures, neglecting to represent a wider range of body types, such as those with stretch marks and larger bellies. This controversy underscored the ongoing debate about true inclusivity in fashion marketing.

== Consumer reports ==
Plus-size clothing patterns have traditionally been graded up from a smaller construction pattern. However, many retailers use statistical data collected from their own measuring projects, and from specialized Body Scan Data collection projects to modernize the fit and construction of their garments. U.S. companies Lane Bryant and Catherines teamed up over a three-year period to source data to modernize the companies' garment construction. 14,000 women were measured in what was the most extensive female sizing study in the U.S. in more than 60 years.

== Sizing and retail availability ==
Major fashion retailers, including H&M and Mango, began reducing their plus size clothing offerings in the US in 2026. This shift was attributed to changing consumer demand and sizing needs driven by the widespread use of GLP-1 weight loss medications.

== Market ==
=== Australia ===
The Australian plus-size clothing market has been growing since at least 1994, with major department stores such as David Jones, Myer, and Target producing their own brand ranges, and an increase in the number of individual boutiques and national chain store outlets across the country. Sizing in Australia is not synchronous with the US; plus-size garments are considered to be size 16 and upward, which is the equivalent of a US size 12. A recent study conducted by IBISWorld reports that "65.2% of the population aged 18 and over are expected to be overweight or obese in 2017-18." This is resulting in more interest and competition in the wider fashion industry, and as such resulting in more department stores stocking plus-size clothing.

Notable Australian chain store brands for plus-size clothing include Maggie T, Autograph (formerly 1626), Johnny Bigg, Free People and City Chic (formerly Big City Chic). There is also a boom in Australian designer independent plus size labels such as Camilla Jayne, Curvy Chic Sports, Hope & Harvest, 17 Sundays, Sonsee, Lowanna Australia, and Harlow.

=== United Kingdom ===
In the UK there are more than 60 brands for plus-size women's clothing; however, only a small number of these brands are manufactured or owned by UK-based companies. High-street stores such as Yours Clothing, Elvi, Evans, Ann Harvey, Dea London and BeigePlus sell only plus-sized garments, while many other brands and department stores carry extended sizes in their shelves, such as Debenhams, River Island, ASOS, Fenwicks and New Look. More recently, stores specifically supplying plus-size sportswear, fitness wear and bras have opened such as State of Mind, Charlotte Jackson, Eve Activewear, and We Fit In. Notable online sites also include ASOS.com, Dearcurves.com and Style908. Anna Scholz has been creating clothes for the high end market since 1995.

Name	Distribution channels	Headquarters in UK	Year established	Multi brand	UK size range	Founder
Ann Harvey	Mult channel	Yes	Unknown	No	16 to 32	Unknown
Anna Scholz	Online	Yes	1996	No	18 to 26	Anna Scholz
BeigePlus	High Street, Online	Yes	1970	Yes	16 to 28	Leanda Walters
Charlotte Jackson	Online	No	2009	Yes	16 to 24	Helen Crossland
Dea London	Online	Yes	Unknown	No	16 to 26	Jelena Fehmi
Dearcurves	Online	Yes	2013	No	14 to 26	Ojoma Idegwu
Debenhams	Mult channel	Yes	1778	Yes	16 to 26	William Clark
Elvi	High Street, Online	Yes	1940	No	14 to 26	Elin Vissor
Evans	High Street, Online	Yes	1930	No	14 to 32	Jack Green
Fenwicks	Mult channel	Yes	1882	Yes	Unknown	John James Fenwick
New Look	Mult channel	Yes	1969	Yes	18 to 28	Tom Singh
River Island	Mult channel	Yes	1948	Yes	18 to 24	Bernard Lewis
YoursClothing	Mult channel	Yes	1990	Yes	18 to 24	AK Retail

Specialist plus-size brands (found in independent plus-size shops) known to be active in the UK (2010) include: Hebbeding (the Netherlands), Dearcurves(UK), Escaladya (Germany), Martine Samoun (Belgium), Marina Rinaldi (Italy), Persona (Italy), Elena Grunert (Germany), Elena Miro (Italy), Verpass (Germany), Chalou (Germany), Kirsten Krog (Denmark), Wille (Germany), Jomhoy (Spain), Yoek (Netherlands), Be The Queen (France), Alain Weiz (France), Tummy Tuck Not Your Daughters Jeans NYDJ (USA), Anathea by Didier Parakian (France), Fred Sabatier (France), Tia (Denmark), Rofa (Germany), Jorli (Denmark), NP (Finland), OpenEnd (Germany), Sumissura (Switzerland), A Big Attitude (USA), Terry Precision Cycling (USA), and Carmakoma (Denmark).

In November 2013, the Debenhams department store chain indicated that it plans to add Size 16 plus-size mannequins in all 170 UK stores.

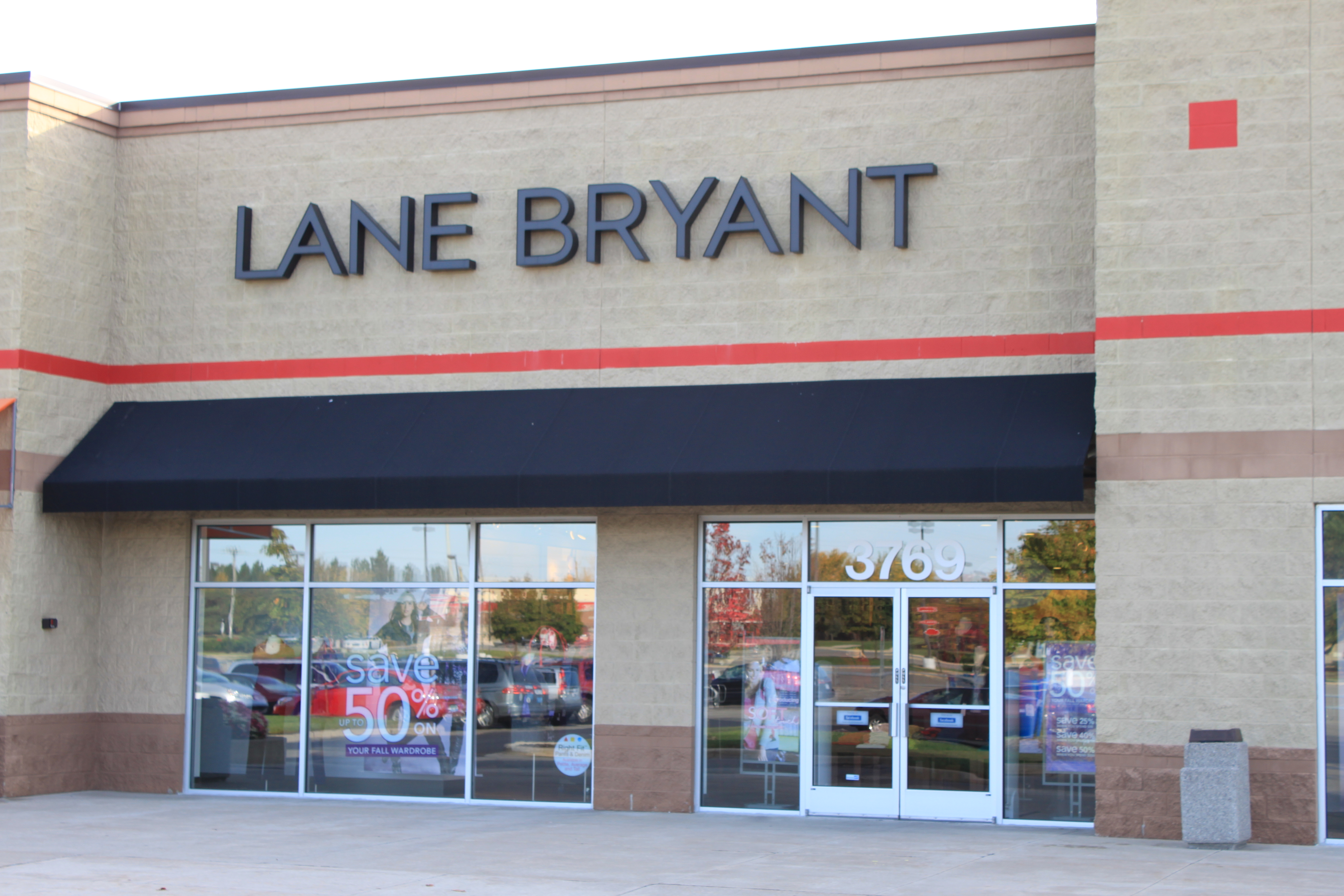
Lane Bryant store Pittsfield Twp., MI

=== United States ===
Notable women's specialty plus-size clothing retail market include Lane Bryant (Ascena Retail Group), Avenue (Avenue Stores, LLC), Torrid, and Ashley Stewart (Ashley Stewart, Inc.).

Walmart also offers a limited but inexpensive plus-size apparel line. The department stores J. C. Penney, Kohl's and Macy's also offer plus-size apparel. Torrid is a retailer geared toward plus-size young adults. International online retailers, such as Simply Be (N Brown) from the UK have started marketing in the United States. Part & Parcel, a social commerce company focused exclusively on clothing for plus-size women, launched in May 2019.

On the men's side, Destination XL Group, Inc. is a major specialty retailer of men's big and tall apparel, with over 300 retail stores throughout the United States, Canada and London, England.

Big Bud Press, based in Los Angeles, is known for their unisex clothing.

== See also ==
- Plus-size model
- Fit model
- Inclusive sizing

== Notes ==
The purpose of the study is to determine the current average clothing size of adult American women. Secondary data of average body measurements from the most recently published National Health and Nutritional Examination Surveys were compared to ASTM International industry clothing size standards.
