= Candice Huffine =

American model (born 1984)

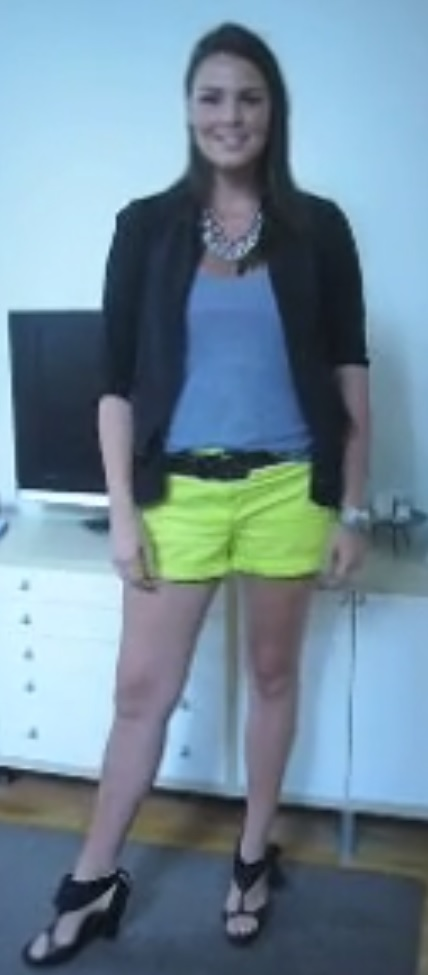
- Huffine in 2010
- Born: October 15, 1984 (age 42); Georgetown, Washington DC, US
- Occupation: Model
- Modeling information
- Height: 5 ft 11 in (1.80 m)
- Agency: IMG (New York, Milan, London, Los Angeles, Paris)

Candice Joy Huffine (born October 15, 1984) is an American plus-size model represented by IMG. A former teenage beauty queen, she signed her first modeling commercial contract in 2000 and has since crossed over from the commercial world into high fashion.

== Early life ==
Candice Huffine was born on October 15, 1984, in Georgetown, Washington, D.C., and raised in suburban Maryland.

== Career ==
As a plus-size model, Candice Huffine has become known for reducing barriers in the fashion industry. Her A-list work includes being featured in publications such as CR Fashion Book, Italian Vogue (cover), Vogue, W, V Magazine, i-D and Glamour. She has worked with top industry names such as Mert and Marcus and Steven Meisel, as well as Carine Roitfeld.

In 2015, she became the first plus-size woman to be featured in the Pirelli Calendar and in 2016 she gained international attention for Lane Bryant's #ImNoAngel campaign. She has appeared in multiple New York Fashion Weeks, including 2017 Fall/Winter walking the runway for noted designers such as Prabal Gurung, Sophie Theallet and Christian Siriano.

== Project Start ==
In 2016, Candice Huffine founded Project Start, a collaborative initiative with Women's Running magazine to encourage and inspire women to begin their running journey.

== Personal life ==
Huffine married Shelly Lynch-Sparks in August 2023 and lives in Brooklyn, New York.
