= Impact of the COVID-19 pandemic on retail =

Aspect of viral outbreak

The COVID-19 pandemic has taken a sharp economic toll on the retail industry worldwide as many retailers and shopping centers were forced to shut down for months due to mandated stay-at-home orders. As a result of these closures, online retailers received a major boost in sales as customers looked for alternative ways to shop and the effects of the retail apocalypse were exacerbated. A number of notable retailers filed for bankruptcy including Ascena Retail Group, Debenhams, Arcadia Group, Brooks Brothers, GNC, J. C. Penney, Lord & Taylor and Neiman Marcus.

Major retailers that closed since the pandemic began include Century 21, Lord & Taylor, and Fry's Electronics.

== Africa ==
=== South Africa ===
- Online retailer Amazon announced it would be adding 3,000 customer service jobs in South Africa to respond to increased demand in North America and Europe for Amazon products.
- Due to COVID-19, sales of tobacco and alcohol were prohibited under lockdown restrictions.
- Edcon put their retail brands Edgars, Jet, and Thank U up for auction and ceased to pay rents for its retail locations following lockdown restrictions as a result of limited sales due to lockdown restrictions.
- On August 3, South African–based supermarket Shoprite announced it would be selling "all or a majority stake" of its Nigerian operations amidst a struggling economy.

== Americas ==
=== Canada ===
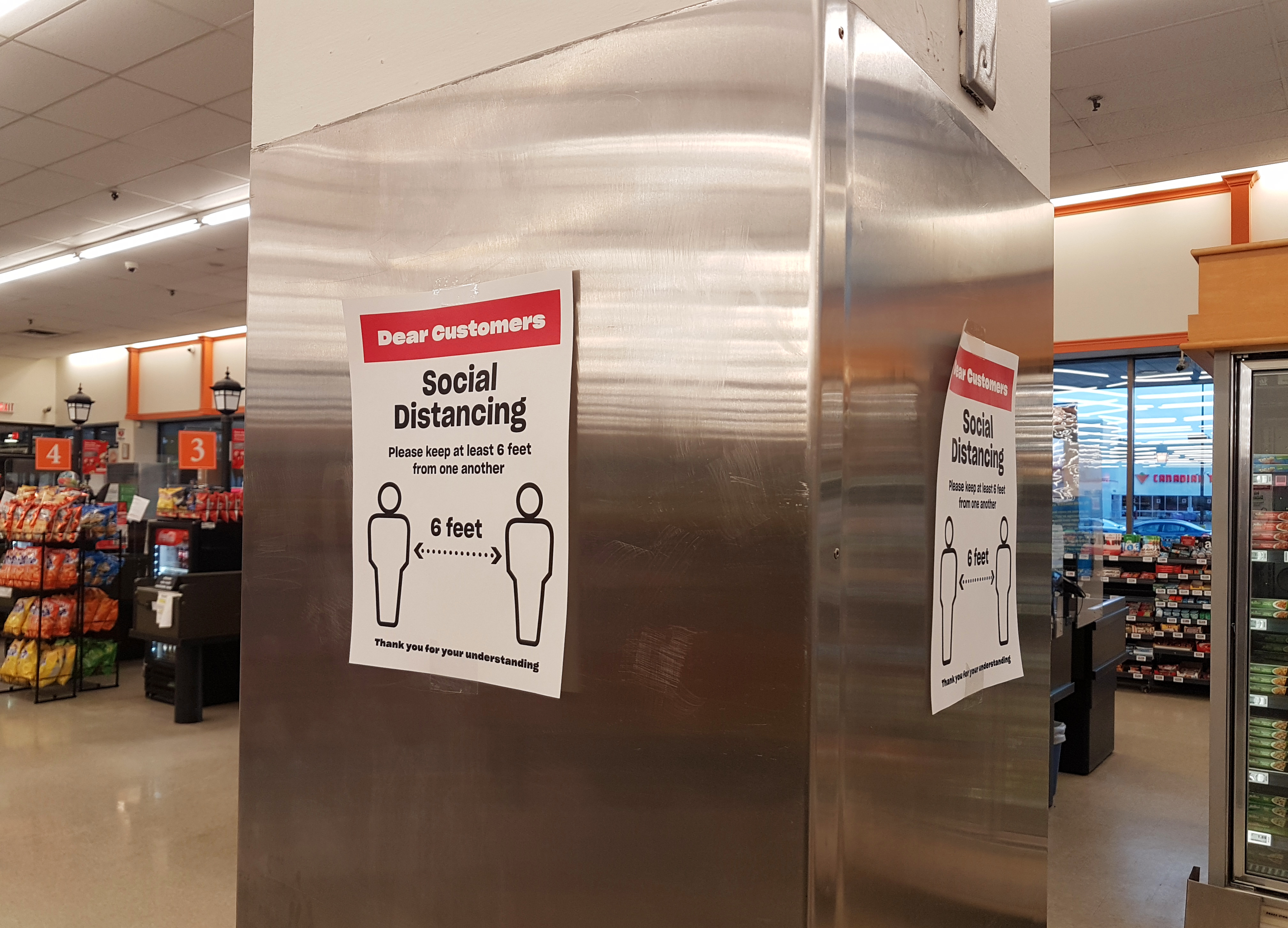
A social distancing sign in an Atlantic Superstore in Nova Scotia, Canada

- During the month of April 2020 retail sales in Canada dropped 26.4% in a record decline for the second month in a row.
- On July 31, 2020, Chico's Canadian subsidiary filed for bankruptcy.
- In July 2020, DavidsTea announced it would close multiple stores amid the impact of the pandemic.

=== United States ===
The United States has had multiple closures attributed to the pandemic and the ensuing recession. As of August 3, 2020, 43 retailers based in the USA have filed for bankruptcy according to CNBC.

==== March 2020 ====
- In the weeks leading up to lockdowns, panic buying of products such as hand sanitizer, toilet paper, and canned foods led to shortages of these items nationwide.
- US-based Apple Inc. announced it would temporarily close all stores globally outside of China on March 14. On the same day, Urban Outfitters, Verizon, and T-Mobile all announced their intentions to temporarily close stores as well.
- The US's largest retailer, Walmart significantly reduced its hours across the nation. Known for its 24-hour store operations, the company initially announced the stores would be open from 6 a.m. to 11 p.m. on March 14. However, on March 19, Walmart announced stores would be open from 7 a.m. to 8:30 p.m. until further notice to allow employees time to clean and stock products.
- Westfield Group announced all 32 of their shopping mall properties would be temporarily closing on March 19 except for essential stores.
- CEO of Kroger, Rodney McMullen, announced that due to increased coronavirus demand, 10,000 job openings were available across their stores.
- The retail and entertainment complex American Dream faced a series of setbacks due to the pandemic. Initially scheduled for March 19, the grand opening of the complex was indefinitely delayed. Retailer GNC pulled out of the project following the pandemic, with other retailers like The Children's Place, Forever 21, and Victoria's Secret possibly withdrawing their plans as well. In June, contractors for the mall claimed they were owed $13 million for unpaid work. The mall would eventually open on October 1, 2020.
- GameStop received criticism for saying it was "an essential business" in states where only essential retailers were to stay open. On March 22, Gamestop closed its stores after outcry from employees.
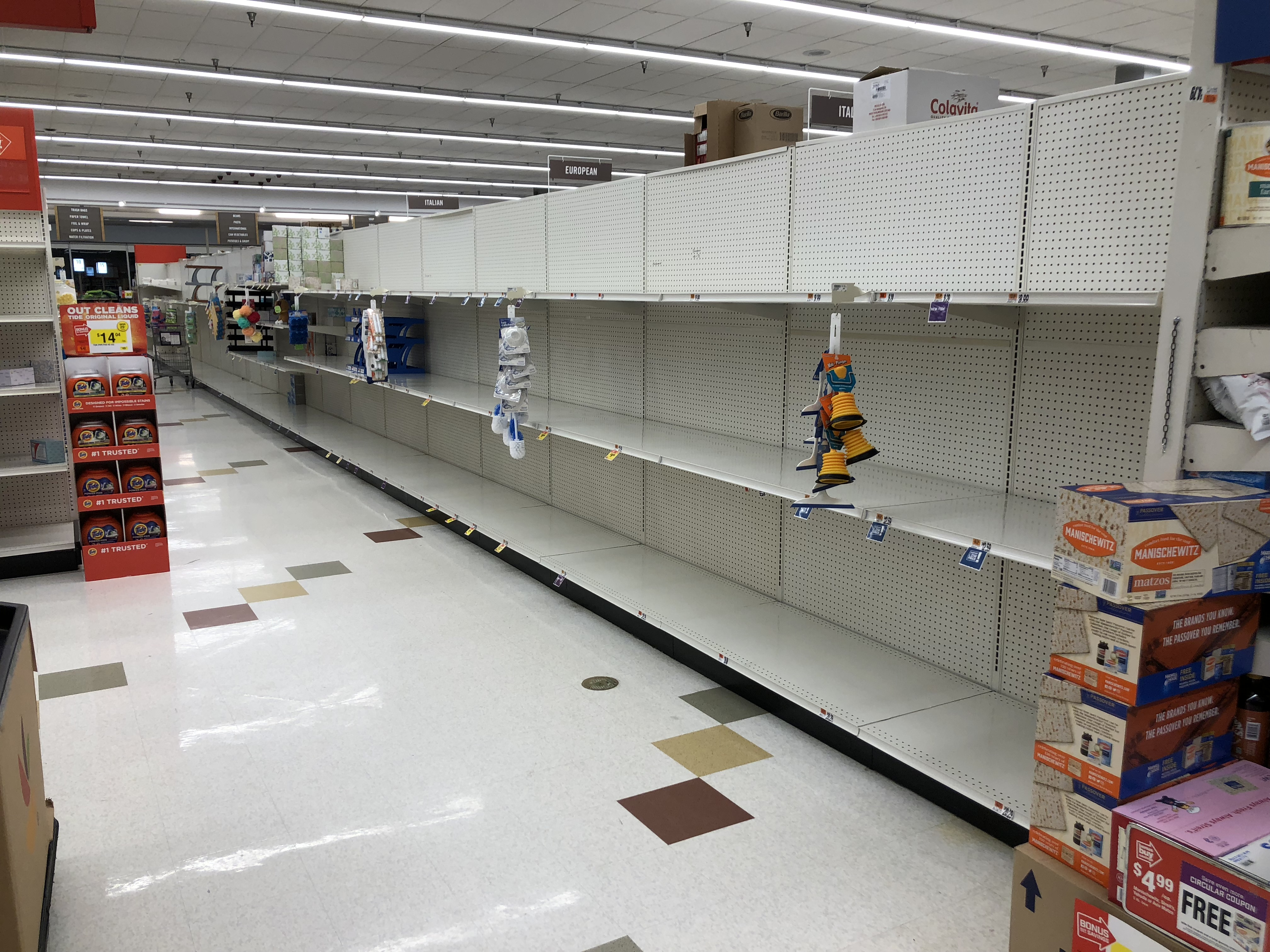
- Bare shelves due to panic buying at the Giant supermarket in Franklin Farm, Virginia in March 2020
  In March, Hobby Lobby left stores open even as many nonessential retailers shut down. The founder reportedly told his employees he had received a message from God that informed his decision to keep stores open.
- On March 31, Walmart announced it would supply its employees with masks and gloves and take employees' temperatures before shifts.
- Simon Property Group, the largest shopping mall operator in the United States, furloughed 30% of its staff on March 31.

==== April 2020 ====
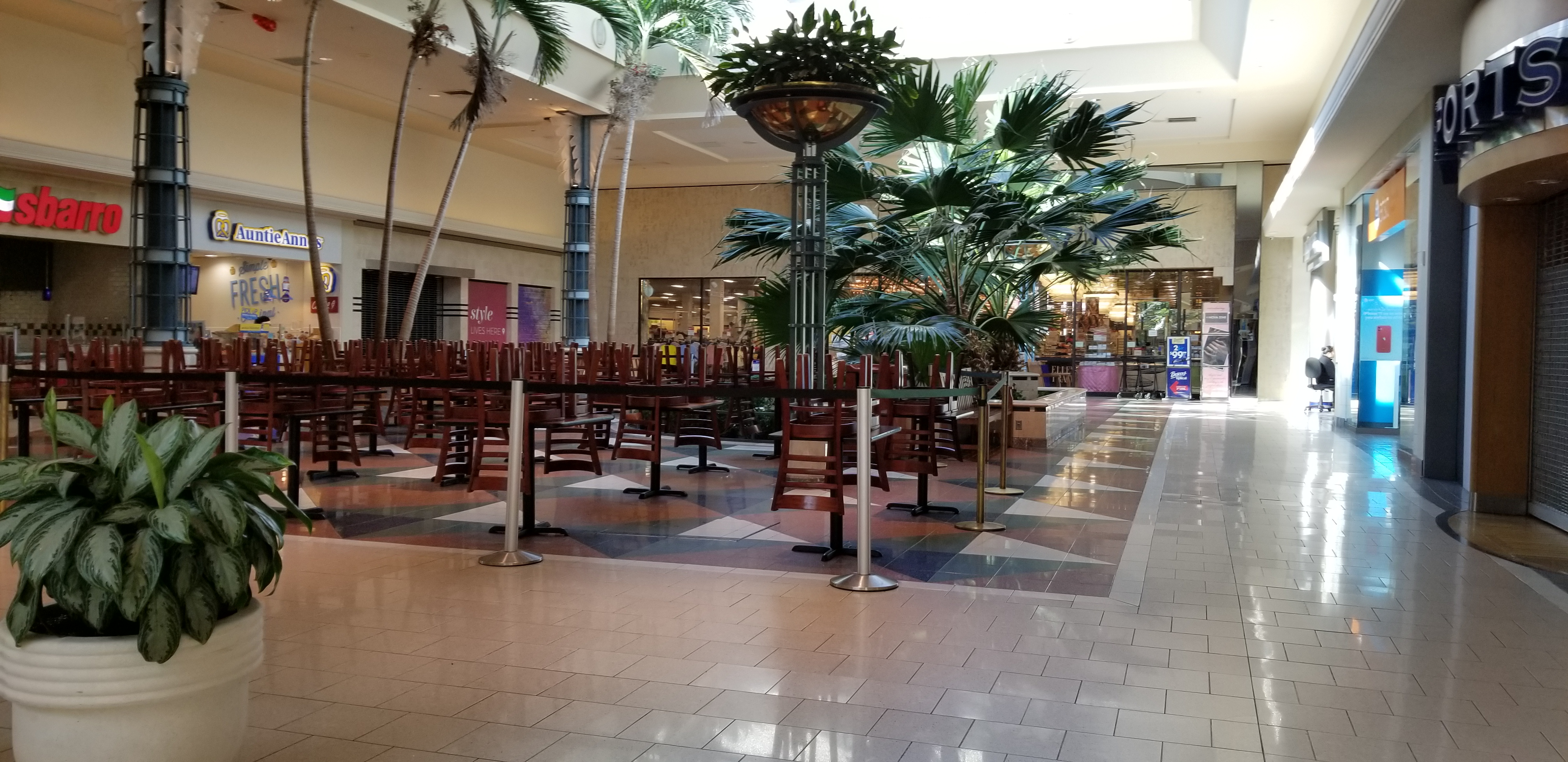
A closed dining area in March 2020 at the Concord Mall in Wilmington, Delaware, during the COVID-19 pandemic

- Shortly following Walmart's announcement for employees, on April 2, Lowe's and Target announced they would also be providing masks and gloves for their employees.
- Bloomberg News reported that nearly 1 million retail workers were furloughed by April 2.
- Macy's, Inc. was dropped from the S&P 500 on April 2.
- Retail sales fell 16.4% in a record drop during the month of April.

==== May 2020 ====
- Following the lifting of some lockdown restrictions in May, retail sales rose by 17.7% in the biggest month to month rise in sales on record.
- J.Crew was the first national retailer to file for Chapter 11 bankruptcy during the pandemic on May 4.
- After 60 years in business, Northgate Mall in Durham, North Carolina, closed on May 4, the first shopping mall in the United States to directly attribute the pandemic as the reason for the closure.
- On May 5, Nordstrom announced its intentions to close 16 locations. The company announced sales were down 40% due to the pandemic on May 28.
- On May 7, luxury department store chain Neiman Marcus filed for Chapter 11 bankruptcy. CEO Geoffroy van Raemdonck insisted that the stores would not be liquidated but that the filing was made to "alleviate debt, access additional capital to run the business during these challenging times, and emerge a stronger company with the ability to better serve you and continue our transformation over the long term."
- 118-year-old department store chain J. C. Penney filed for Chapter 11 bankruptcy on May 15 as the pandemic battered the already struggling retailer.

==== June 2020 ====
- CNBC reported on June 5 that CBL Properties, owner of over 100 mall properties located primarily in the Southeast, was in doubt that it could continue operation as a going concern, after their retail tenants missed payments which caused the business to miss their payments as well. On July 17, Bloomberg News reported that CBL was preparing to file for bankruptcy.
- On June 9, retail research firm Coresight estimated the number of store closures in the United States could reach 25,000 due to the pandemic and the resulting recession, greatly surpassing the previous year's record high of 9,302.
- As of June 16, Mall of America owner Triple Five Group was reported to have missed three consecutive payments on a $1.4 million debt mortgage for the property.
- Two shopping malls closed on June 30, Metrocenter in Phoenix, Arizona, and the Cascade Mall in Burlington, Washington. Both directly cited the pandemic as a contributing factor in the closure.
- Health retailer GNC announced the closure of "at least 800 to 1,200 stores" after filing for Chapter 11 bankruptcy on June 23.
- The United States Department of Commerce reported that retail sales had increased by 7.5% in June as lockdown restrictions were further eased.
- Old Time Pottery filed for Chapter 11 bankruptcy on June 30.

==== July 2020 ====
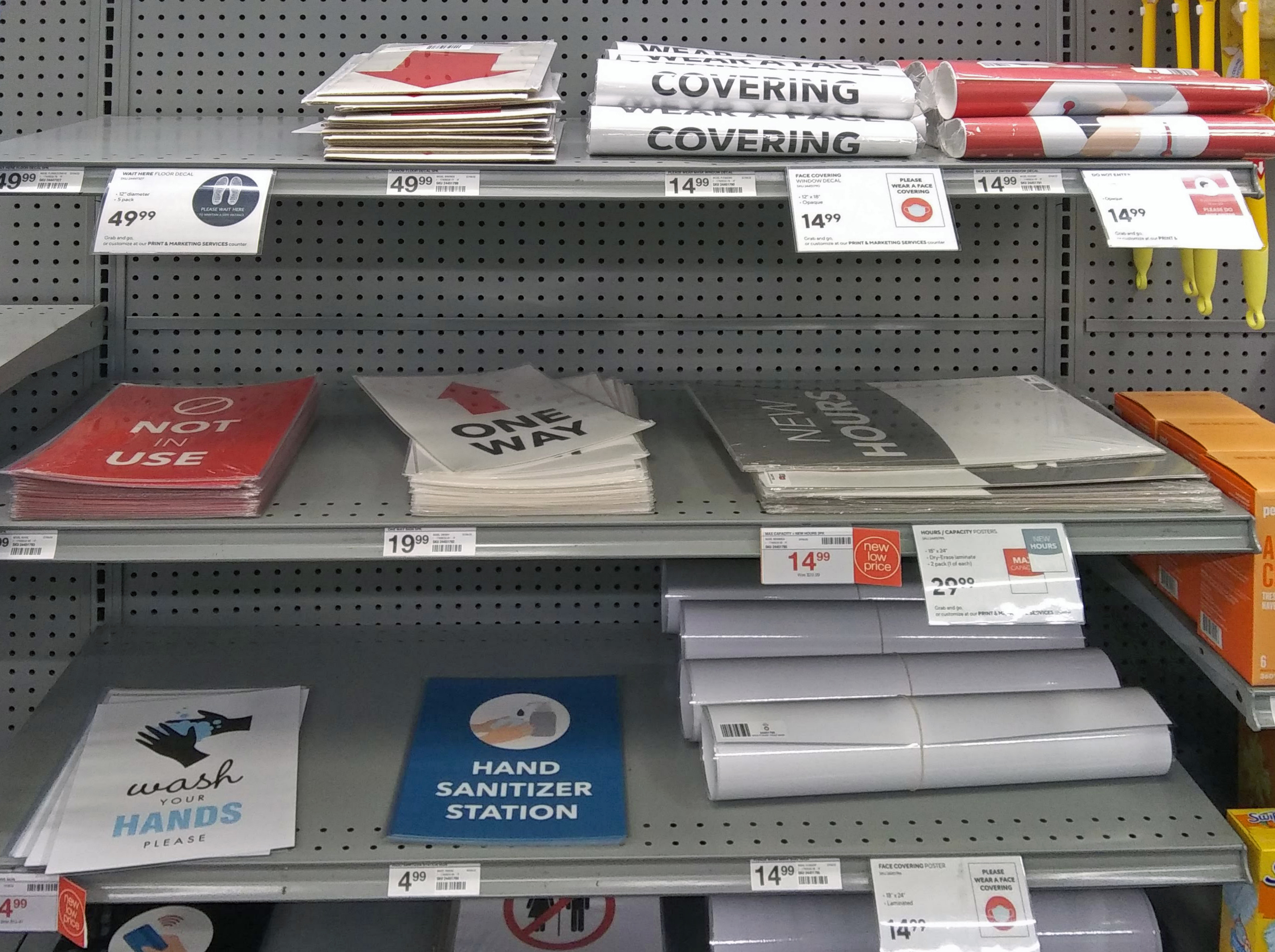
Pandemic-related signs for businesses on sale at a Staples

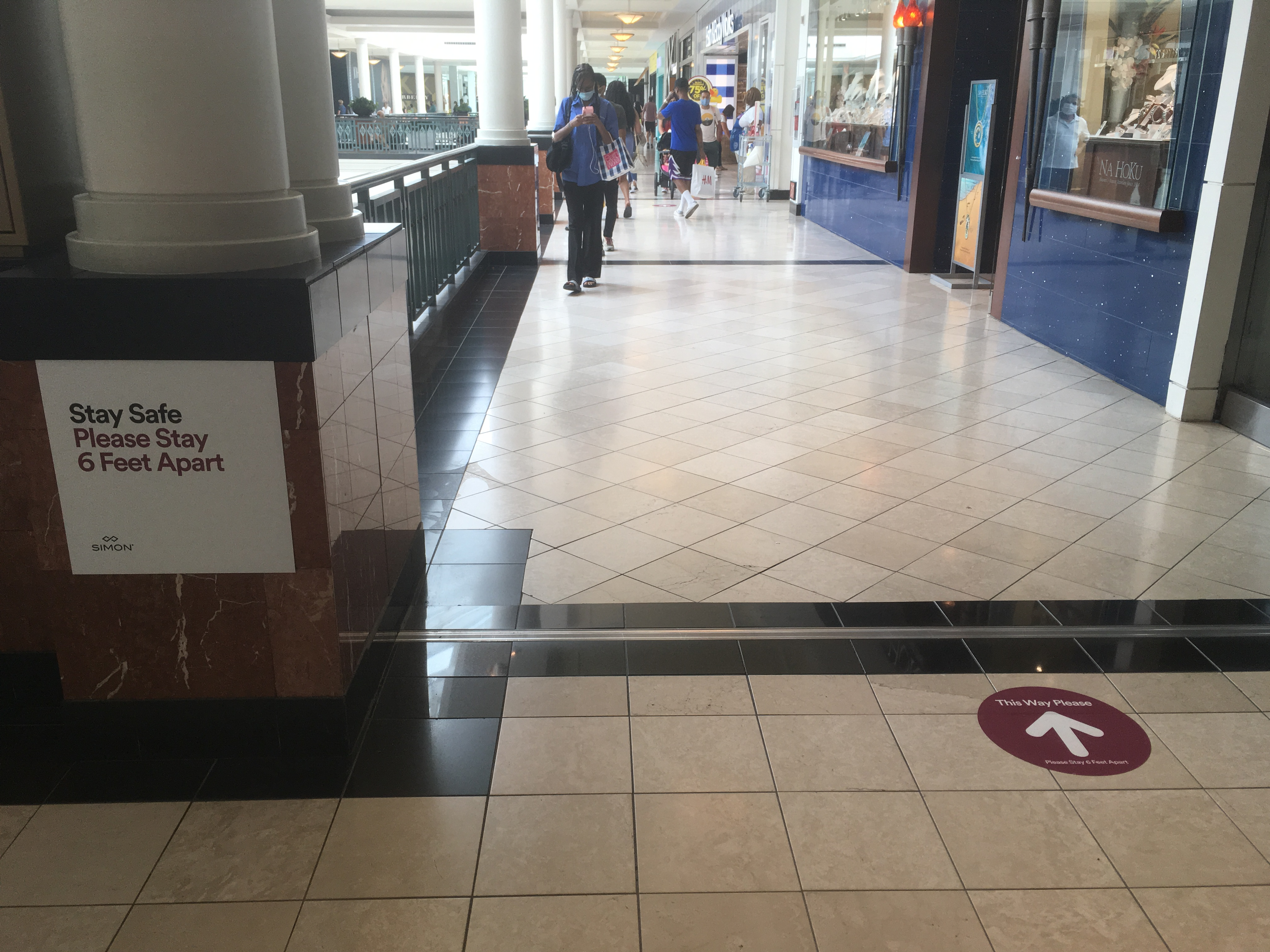
Floor decals and signs promoting one-way traffic and social distancing at the King of Prussia Mall in King of Prussia, Pennsylvania

- Bloomberg News reported on July 7 that Ascena Retail Group, parent company of Ann Taylor Loft, Justice, and Lane Bryant, would file for bankruptcy. On July 23, the company filed for Chapter 11 bankruptcy and announced it plans to close stores, with a "significant" number of closures for the Justice stores.
- The US's oldest men's retailer Brooks Brothers filed for bankruptcy on July 8 after years of faltering sales from a shift to more casual workplace attire that was exacerbated by the pandemic. On July 23, Simon Property Group and Authentic Brands made a bid of $3.5 million to try and keep 125 stores open.
- RTW Retailwinds, parent company of New York & Company filed for bankruptcy on July 13 with plans to close "most, if not all stores".
- On July 14, PVH Corp, parent of brands such as Tommy Hilfiger, Calvin Klein, and Izod, announced it will close all 162 of its Heritage Retail outlet stores and lay off about 450 employees.
- Multiple retailers including Best Buy, Walmart, Target, Kroger, CVS Pharmacy, and Walgreens announced they would require customers to wear face masks to shop at their stores.
- The National Retail Federation reported that back to school shopping sales could hit record highs as parents and students buy more expensive items such as laptops and other technology to prepare for more distance learning.
- 21 CEOs of retail businesses penned an open letter on CNN.com to governors across the country on July 17, pleading for mandatory mask requirements in retail establishments. Amongst the 21 CEOs included are Mary Dillon, CEO of Ulta Beauty, Sonia Syngal, CEO of Gap Inc., Jill Soltau, CEO of J. C. Penney, and Bill Rhodes, CEO of AutoZone.
- Walmart and Sam's Club announced their stores would not be open on Thanksgiving Day in 2020, suspending its early Black Friday hours to give their employees more time to spend with their families during the pandemic. Several other retailers also announced they will be closed on Thanksgiving Day in 2020 including Academy Sports + Outdoors, Best Buy, Costco, Dick's Sporting Goods, Hobby Lobby, The Home Depot, Kohl's, and Target.

==== August 2020 ====
- The United States' oldest department store chain, Lord & Taylor, filed for Chapter 11 bankruptcy on August 2. Later that same evening, Tailored Brands, parent of Men's Wearhouse and JoS. A. Bank also filed for bankruptcy.
- Many back to school sales were delayed or experienced lesser sales than previous years as uncertainty after changes in the school year led to increased unease over buying unneeded supplies.
- The discount department store chain, Stein Mart, filed for bankruptcy on August 12. By the end of October 2020, all stores had finished the liquidation process and were closed.

==== September 2020 ====
- On September 10, the New York City–based department store chain Century 21 announced it would close all 13 stores.

==== October 2020 ====
- Retail research and advisory firm Coresight Research and shopping rewards app Shopkick declared a new campaign called the "10.10 Shopping Festival" to anticipate shipping delays for the holiday season. It lasted from October 9–12.

==== November 2020 ====
- Mall owners CBL Properties and PREIT both filed for bankruptcy on November 1.
- On November 5, Sony announced the PlayStation 5 console would be sold online only on its launch day (November 12 in the US) due to concerns regarding the pandemic.
- The Centers for Disease Control and Prevention classified "going shopping in crowded stores just before, on, or after Thanksgiving" (as in the usual Black Friday tradition) as a "higher-risk activity" on November 19.
- Black Friday sales in-store were down by more than 52% from the previous year.

==== January 2021 ====
- On January 14, Christopher & Banks filed for Chapter 11 Bankruptcy. All stores were closed due to the filing.
- Godiva Chocolatier announced it would close all of its 128 US brick and mortar stores by March. The company cited declining traffic in stores caused by the pandemic as a contributing factor in the decision.
- North Carolina–based department store chain Belk announced it would file for Chapter 11 bankruptcy on January 26. The company intends to continue "normal operations" during the process.

==== February 2021 ====
- On February 24, Fry's Electronics announces it will be closing all of its stores nationwide and ceasing operations "as a result of changes in the retail industry and the challenges posed by the COVID-19 pandemic."

==== Since March 2021 ====
- In early 2023, rumors surfaced that Party City had intention to file for Chapter 11 Bankruptcy in the United States. Party City Holdco Inc. filed for bankruptcy on January 17, 2023, weighed down by a confluence of factors including the pandemic and changing consumer behavior. The move is part of an attempt to restructure and reduce the company's debt. The company secured $150 million in financing that will allow it to keep its stores open and operations running. The move will help the company complete an "expedited restructuring" to reduce its debt that should be done by the second quarter of 2023.
- On January 27, 2023, Bed Bath & Beyond announced that it would be closing all Harmon Face Values stores due to the COVID-19 pandemic impacting it business and supply chain issues.

== Asia ==
=== China ===
- On March 16, 2020, it was reported that retail sales dropped 20.5% after the pandemic hit the country, a percentage that, according to Business Insider, was unseen since the 2008 financial crisis.
- Retail sales continued to decrease with a 2.8% decline in May 2020 and 1.8% in June from where they were at the same time in 2019.

== Europe ==
=== United Kingdom ===
==== February 2020 ====
- In the weeks leading up to lockdowns, panic buying of products such as hand sanitizer, toilet paper, pasta, rice, flour, sugar, yeast, and tinned foods led to shortages of these items nationwide.
- With many people seeing disinfectant as providing protection against the spread of the disease, sales in cleaning products such as Dettol began to surge.
- By the end of February, London's FTSE 100 share index has seen one of its worst weeks since the 2008 financial crisis, as over £200,000,000,000 is wiped off the value of UK firms.
- A small number of retailers suggested that online orders shipped from China were reduced because of the impact of COVID-19.

==== March 2020 ====
- In March, the monthly retail sales volume fell sharply by 5.1%, as many stores ceased trading from March 23 following official government guidance during the pandemic.
- Tesco and other retailers start to impose limits on the sale of essential items.
- Retailers say online and click-and-collect services are at "full capacity".
- On March 13, British job recruiters predicted the retail and hospitality industries would be hit hardest by the pandemic.
- The collapse of Laura Ashley made it the first casualty of the pandemic with a loss of 2,700 jobs.
- Fashion house Burberry announced it would cut 500 jobs globally after sales declined 45% during the first quarter of 2020.
- On March 30, Carluccio's and BrightHouse collapse into administration.
- On March 31, Aldi Süd, Morrisons, Waitrose and Asda started to ease restrictions on some of their products which were imposed in the wake of stockpiling earlier in the month.

==== April 2020 ====
- The volume of retail sales fell by a record 18.1%, following the strong monthly fall of 5.2% in March 2020.
- The proportion spent online soared to the highest on record in April 2020 at 30.7%, which compares with the 19.1% reported in April 2019.
- All 60 Cath Kidston stores to close after collapse.
- On April 30, Oasis and Warehouse permanently close all their stores and online shopping with the loss of more than 1,800 jobs.
- Sharon White, John Lewis boss, hints that some of their shops may not re-open after the pandemic.
- Debenhams files for administration

==== May 2020 ====
- Retail sales volumes started to rebound with an increase of 12.0% when compared with the falls experienced in the previous month, but sales were still down by 13.1% on February before the impact of the pandemic.
- Debenhams cuts more than 1,000 head office jobs
- Shop closures due to coronavirus lockdown push British Land to a £1.1bn annual loss.

==== June 2020 ====
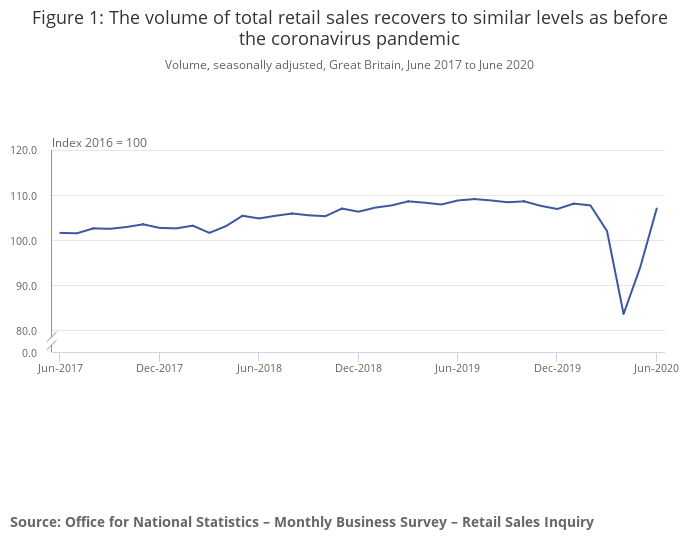
The volume of total retail sales recovers to similar levels as before the coronavirus pandemic.

- Monsoon close 35 stores putting 545 jobs at risk of redundancy.
- On June 26, Shopping centre owner Intu entered administration.

==== July 2020 ====
- On July 1, TM Lewin announced they would be closing all of their stores, with 600 workers losing their jobs.
- On July 19, luxury clothing retailer Ted Baker announced they will cut 500 jobs.
- On July 20, Marks & Spencer announced they were to cut 950 jobs.
- On July 24, the Office for National Statistics (ONS) showed retail sales had returned to pre-pandemic levels.
- John Lewis & Partners announced eight stores would not reopen after the lockdown.
- Boots consults on plans to cut head office and store teams and shut 48 of its Boots Opticians practices. Over 4,000 jobs were affected.
- Hammerson, the landlord that owns the Bullring in Birmingham and the Brent Cross Shopping Centre in North London, said it had collected just 16% of rent due in May and June and had drawn down £300,000,000 in funding from its credit facility to support the business.
- The British Retail Consortium announce that sales increased by 3.2% in July, against an increase of 0.5% in July 2019, however, most of this was online sales plus 2020 having an extra week in January on the ONS Calendar.

==== August 2020 ====
- DW Sports, entered administration, putting 1,700 jobs at risk.
- PizzaExpress considers closing 67 of its UK restaurants, which would mean the loss of 1,100 jobs.
- Dixons cut 800 store management jobs
- Hays Travel, the UK's largest independent travel agent at the time, cuts up to 878 jobs after the government's move to quarantine arrivals from Spain.
- On August 5, WHSmith announce they may cut 1,500 jobs after sales plummet
- On August 5, nearly 400 jobs are affected at M&Co. as they are put into administration.
- On August 11, the British Retail Consortium repeated a call for a UK Government grant to help pay rents, saying retailers were "struggling".
- On August 11, Debenhams announced they will cut 2,500 more jobs.
- The ONS shows that more than 730,000 jobs have been lost in the UK since the beginning of March.
- NatWest Group plans to cut 550 jobs in branches across the UK and close one of its remaining offices in London.
- On August 18, Marks & Spencer announced they plan to cut 7,000 jobs over the next three months.
- PizzaExpress closed 73 outlets, impacting 1,100 jobs.

==== Autumn 2020 ====
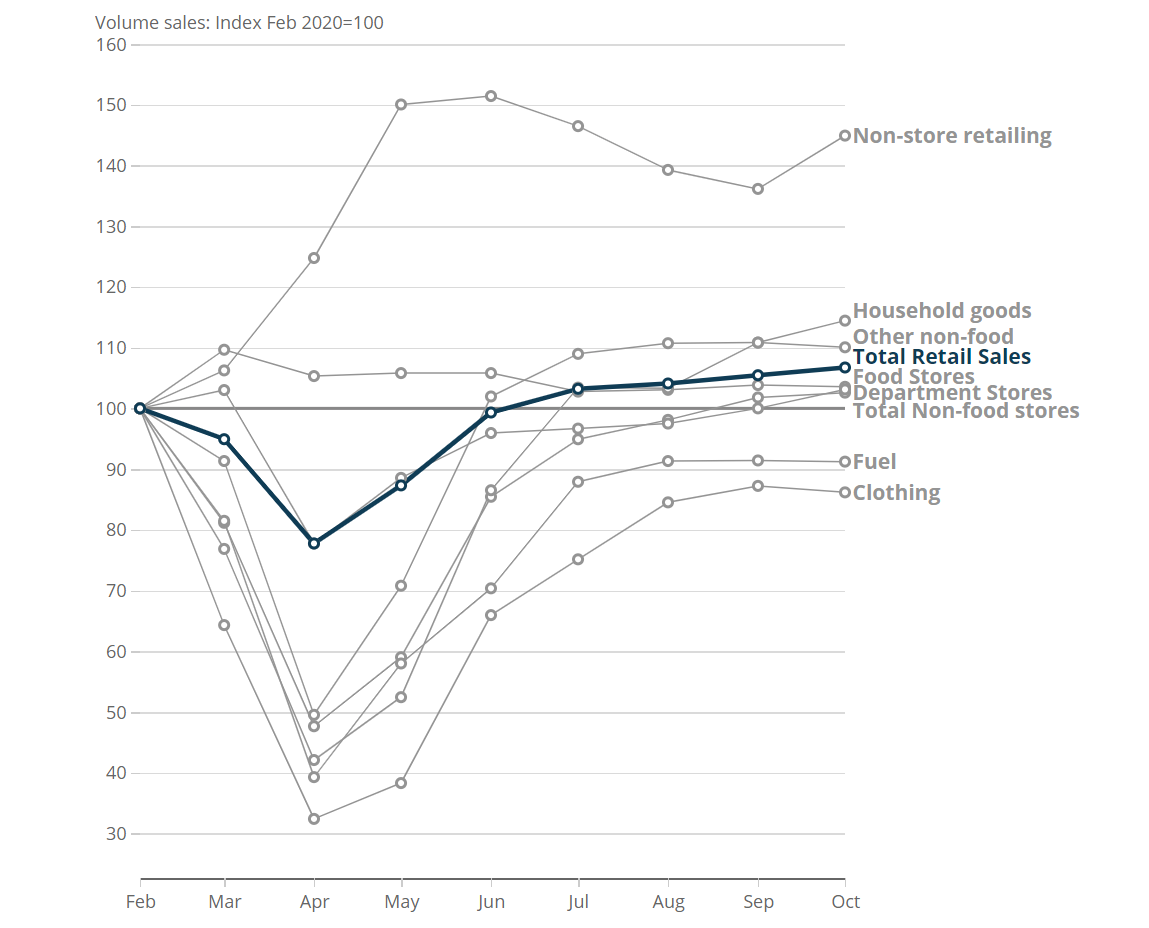
Volume sales, seasonally adjusted, Great Britain, February 2020 to October 2020

- British retail sales growth slowed in November when non-essential stores shut as part of a four-week lockdown in England, but online sales were able to fill more of the gap than in the first lockdown in March.
- Fashion chains Peacocks and Jaeger enter administration, putting more than 4,700 jobs and almost 500 shops at risk.
- On November 30, Arcadia Group (owner of Topshop, Topman, Burton and Dorothy Perkins) fell into administration.
- Arcadia entering administration caused a knock-on effect as a day later Debenhams fell into liquidation. This was due to JD Sports, the last remaining bidder, withdrawing because of the collapse of Arcadia; which was the biggest concession operator in Debenhams.
- Bonmarché enter administration for the third time.
- Primark revealed that the latest wave of COVID-19 lockdowns cost the fashion chain £430,000,000 in lost sales but that it has experienced a "phenomenal" jump in sales this week since stores were allowed to re-open.
- On December 7, Frasers Group claimed it was in negotiations to buy department store chain Debenhams from the administrators in a rescue deal, preventing it from going into liquidation.
- The retail intelligence agency Springboard claimed Footfall on Boxing Day was down by 57% compared to the previous year (2019).
- The UK Government has named 72 high streets across England that have been selected to receive £831,000,000 of investment to help fund their recovery from the impact of the coronavirus pandemic and to protect jobs.

==== January 2021 ====
- Sales fell by −8.2% in January compared to December 2020 the month before, showing that all sectors of retailing except for food and online outlets were affected by the imposition of tough new restrictions across the UK.
- Debenhams shops will close permanently after Boohoo makes an acquisition. Boohoo were not interested in the 118 high street stores or its workforce.

==== February 2021 ====
- ASOS acquires the Topshop, Topman, Miss Selfridge and HIIT brands for £265,000,000 and a further £30,000,000 for the stock. The stores (70 stores with 2,500 employees) were not included leading to a significant loss of jobs.

== Hazard controls ==
The US's Centers for Disease Control and Prevention issued guidance for businesses and employers on COVID-19 prevention and management measures in the workplace. Engineering controls such as altered workspaces to allow physical distancing, plexiglass barriers, and improved ventilation were recommended. Administration controls such as training, symptom screening, routine cleaning, avoiding shared equipment and office space, staggered shifts, and flexible sick leave policies were strategies to keep employees safe and healthy. Personal protective equipment such as face coverings or gloves were deemed necessary depending on the job tasks.

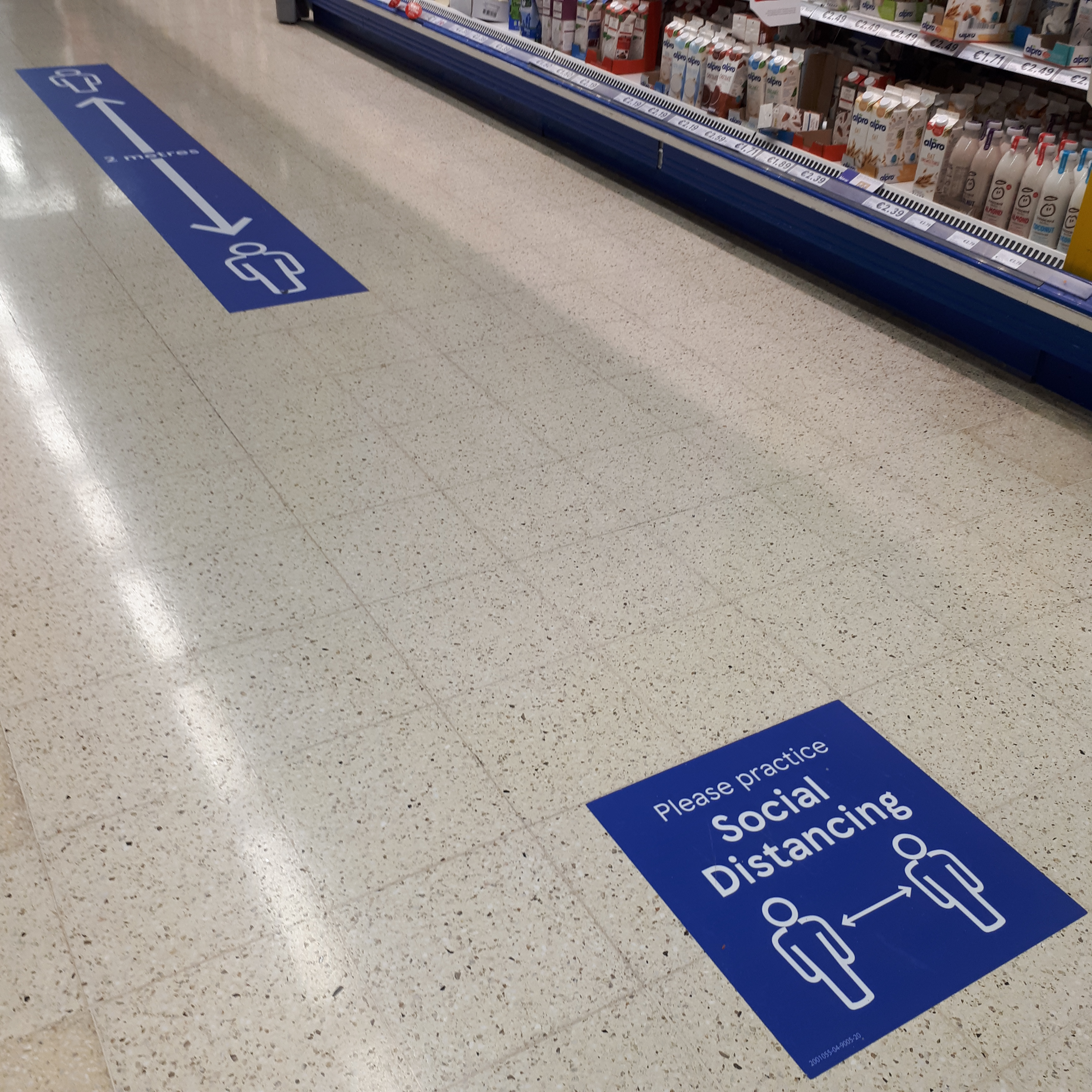
Supermarket social distancing signs in Ireland, 2020

Efforts to encourage social distancing to reduce airborne transmission affected spatial design principles used by retailers.
