= Fashion to Figure =

American clothing retailer

Fashion To Figure
- Type: Privately held
- Industry: Retail
- Founded: 2002
- Founder: Michael Kaplan; Nicholas Kaplan
- Headquarters: New York City, United States
- Number of locations: 26 (as of 2016)
- Key people: Michael Kaplan, CEO; Nicholas Kaplan, COO; Frances Freixas, Chief Merchant
- Products: Plus-size clothing, related accessories
- Website: www.ftf.com

Fashion To Figure is a United States retailer focusing on plus-size clothing and related accessories. In November 2017, its parent company, B. Lane Inc., filed for bankruptcy.

== Founding ==
Fashion To Figure was co-founded by brothers Michael and Nicholas Kaplan, two of Lena Bryant's great-grandsons. Their father, Steven, was president of Lane Bryant until the company was sold to The Limited Inc. in 1982. Nicholas Kaplan previously served as a Saks Fifth Avenue department manager and buyer, general merchandise manager at Bluefly, and co-founder of the Designer Warehouse liquidation chain. Michael Kaplan served as an analyst at Lazard and co-founded an online shopping community for plus-sized women with RRE Ventures.

The Kaplan brothers grew up hearing stories about how their widowed great-grandmother supported herself by selling the first maternity and full-figure dresses available to American women, which inspired them to carry on their family's tradition.

== Expansion and locations ==
The first Fashion To Figure store opened at the Palisades Center Mall in West Nyack, New York in October 2004. The second store opened in 2005 at the Livingston Mall in Livingston, New Jersey. By 2011, the store opened in seven locations in New York and New Jersey. Two more stores were opened in 2011. The company launched its online store in 2010.

The store targets women and teenagers sized 12 to 26. The chain is named after famous a quote by Lena Bryant, founder of the plus-sized women's clothing chain. Asked in 1950 by a Glamour magazine interviewer about the secret of her success, Bryant said, "You should never ask women to conform their figures to fashion, but rather bring fashion to the figure."

Fashion To Figure is not a vertically integrated retailer, but sources its inventory from more than one hundred vendors. The company's CEO, Michael Kaplan, believes this allows it to provide plus-sized consumers with more choices. In 2010, Fashion To Figure opened a store in the Cross County Shopping Center co-branded with P.S. and Wet Seal. It was later demolished in 2017 for Ulta Beauty and Sprint.

As of March 29, Fashion to Figure stores has reported that it had to let 263 employees go due to store closures during the COVID-19 pandemic.

== Bankruptcy ==
In November 2017, Fashion To Figure's parent company, B. Lane Inc., filed for Chapter 11 bankruptcy. In August 2020, Fashion to Figure was sold for $40 million to Saadia Group after its second bankruptcy.
