= Nancy Koehn =

American historian

Nancy F. Koehn
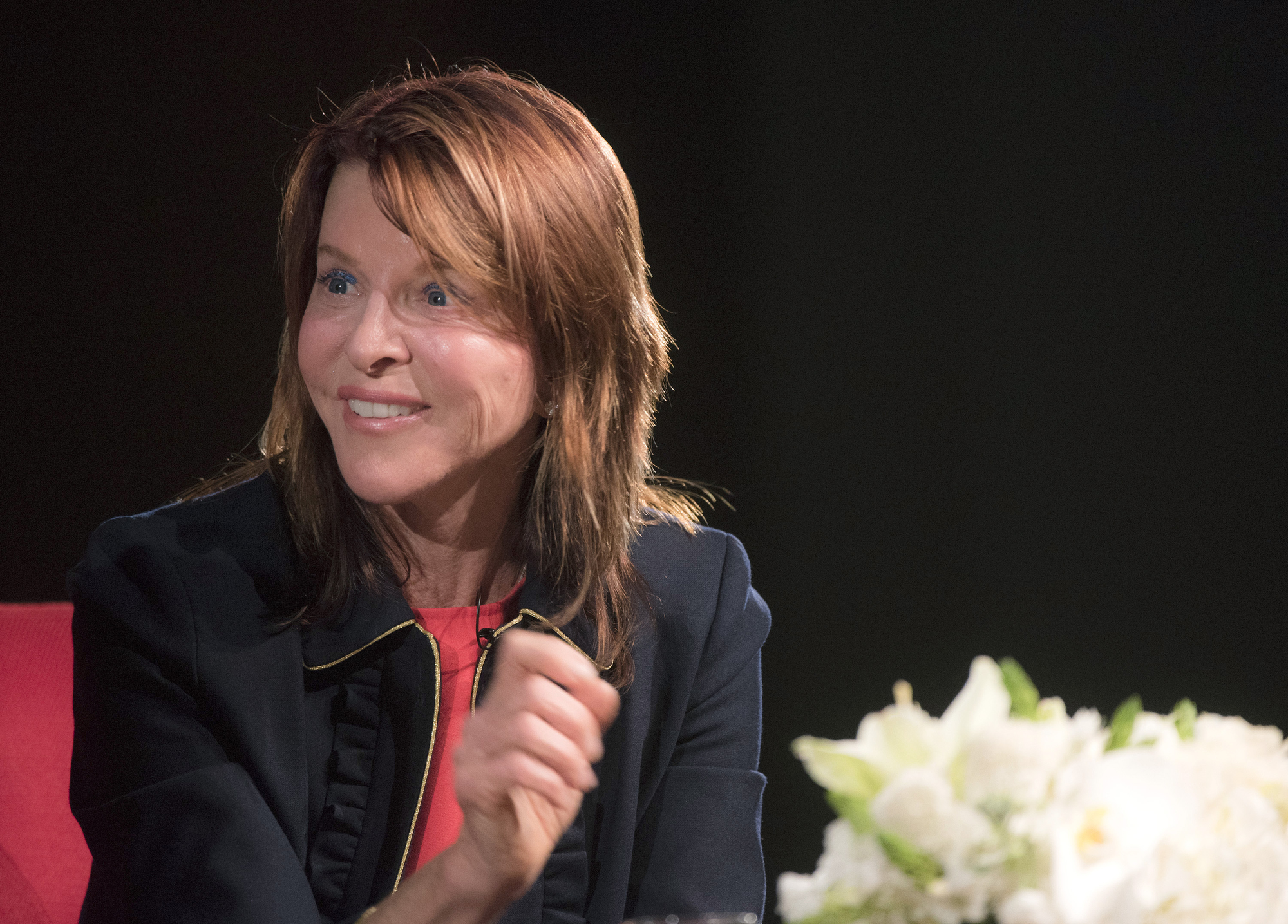
- Koehn at the LBJ Presidential Library in 2019
- Born: 1959 (age 65–66); United States
- Occupation(s): business historian, professor, author
- Board member of: Tempur Sealy International, Fashion To Figure (clothing retailer)
- Website: nancykoehn.com

Nancy F. Koehn (born 1959) is an author and a business historian at Harvard Business School in Boston, Massachusetts, where she is the James E. Robison Professor of Business Administration, and was a visiting scholar during 2011–2013. She is also a member of Harvard's Faculty of Arts and Sciences, in the Economics Department.

== Education ==
- B.A., History (Phi Beta Kappa), Stanford University
- Master of Public Policy (M.P.P.), Kennedy School of Government, Harvard University
- MA, Harvard University (European History)
- PhD, Harvard University (European History)

== Career ==
Koehn is a business historian at Harvard Faculty of Arts and Sciences and has been a business historian at Harvard Business School, since 2011 (some online sources say 1991). She began as a Visiting Scholar (2011–2013), then was offered the James E. Robison Professor of Business Administration, which she has held since 2013. Her predecessor in that endowed Chair was James Cash Jr.

Koehn is widely quoted on radio and television, and is a regular featured contributor to WGBH, an NPR radio station in Boston, Massachusetts, near Harvard Business School. She has been a speaker at the World Economic Forum in Davos, the Aspen Institute Ideas Festival, and the World Business Forum, and has appeared on American Experience, Good Morning America, Bloomberg Television, CNBC's Moneywheel, The NewsHour, A&E's Biography, CNN's Money Line, and many other television programs. She writes regularly for The New York Times, The Washington Post, The Huffington Post, and the Harvard Business Review Online, and is a regular commentator on BBC. Numerous corporations consult with her for strategic guidance.

She is also a director of Fashion To Figure, a clothing retailer, and of Tempur Sealy International.

=== Academic appointments ===
- 2004–2011, lecturer, History and Literature concentration, Department of Economics, Faculty of Arts and Sciences, Harvard University, Cambridge, MA
- 2011–2013, visiting scholar, Harvard Business School, Allston, Massachusetts
- 2013–present, James E. Robison Professor of Business Administration, Harvard Business School, Allston, Massachusetts

== Author ==
In Forged in Crisis, Koehn explores what qualities make for a great leader, using the examples of Ernest Shackleton, Abraham Lincoln, Dietrich Bonhoeffer, Rachel Carson, and Frederick Douglass. The book became a Wall Street Journal Bestseller in November 2017.

She has devoted significant interest to women in leadership; has written two books about Oprah Winfrey, and had a role in Harvard's offering her an honorary doctorate.

== Personal life ==
Koehn is single and is a breast cancer survivor. She describes herself as "an avid equestrian" and, on her personal website, as a "Teacher, Rider, Poet, Pilgrim". She often references her love of horses, of riding horses, and her care of three horses.

== Works ==
Books:

- Forged in Crisis: The Power of Courageous Leadership. Scribner. 2017. p. 528. ISBN 978-1-5011-7444-5., spotlights five masters of crisis: polar explorer Ernest Shackleton; President Abraham Lincoln; abolitionist Frederick Douglass; Nazi-resisting clergyman Dietrich Bonhoeffer; and environmental crusader Rachel Carson.
- Oprah (Brand) Renew (2011)
- Oprah: Leading with Heart (2011)
- Ernest Shackleton: Exploring Leadership, (2010: ISBN 978-0-9830-0011-2; 2012)
- The Story of American Business: From the Pages of the New York Times (2009, Harvard Business Press, ISBN 978-1-5913-9683-3
- Brand New: How Entrepreneurs Earned Consumers' Trust from Wedgwood to Dell (2001, ISBN 978-1-5785-1221-8)
- The Power of Commerce: Economy and Governance in the First British Empire (1994, ISBN 978-0-8014-2699-5)

Contributing Author:

- Creative Capitalism: A Conversation with Bill Gates, Warren Buffett and other Economic Leaders (2008)
- Remember Who You Are: Life Stories That Inspire the Heart and Mind (2004)
- Beauty and Business (2000)
- The Intellectual Venture Capitalist: John H. McArthur and the Work of the Harvard Business School, 1980–1995 (1999)
- Creating Modern Capitalism: How Entrepreneurs, Companies, and Countries Triumphed in Three Industrial Revolutions (1997)
- Management Past and Present: A Casebook on American Business History (1995)

Journal articles:

- Koehn, Nancy F. "Great Men, Great Pay? Why CEO Compensation Is Sky High." Opinions. Washington Post (June 12, 2014). View Details
- Koehn, Nancy F. "Calling All Leaders: Feed and Water Yourself." Huffington Post, The Blog (March 25, 2014).

Harvard Business School Case Studies:

Nancy Koehn has written and supervised Harvard Business School business cases, including

- Starbucks Coffee Company
- Bono and U2
- Celeste Walker
- Dell Computer
- Ernest Shackleton
- Estée Lauder
- Henry Heinz
- Marshall Field
- Milton Hershey
- Oprah Winfrey
- Stonyfield Yogurt
- Whole Foods
- Wedgwood

== See also ==
- Harvard Business School
- Business history
- Economic history

== External sources ==
- Nancy Koehn's faculty profile, Harvard Business School
- Nancy F. Koehn's personal website
- Nancy Koehn's Twitter account – @nancykoehn
- Harvard Business School Working Knowledge (case studies; HBS pioneered the case study method in business education
- The James and Anne Robinson Foundation, Armonk, NY
- Forged in Crisis book website
