= Charming Shoppes =

Specialty and plus size clothing company

Charming Shoppes, Inc.
- Type: Subsidiary
- Industry: Retail
- Founded: 1940; 86 years ago
- Defunct: 2012; 14 years ago
- Fate: Merger with Ascena Retail Group
- Headquarters: Bensalem, Pennsylvania, U.S.
- Key people: Jim P. Fogarty - President and Chief Executive Officer
- Products: Woman's clothing
- Revenue: ▲$811 Million USD (2008)
- Number of employees: 10,300 (2008)
- Parent: Ascena Retail Group (2012–present)
- Subsidiaries: Lane Bryant; Petite Sophisticate; Catherines
- Website: www.charmingshoppes.com

Charming Shoppes, Inc. is a specialty and plus size clothing retail holding company based in Bensalem, Pennsylvania; a suburb of Philadelphia. Its subsidiaries include Lane Bryant, Cacique, Fashion Bug, and Catherines Plus. Clothes were sold from over 2300 retail stores in the United States, as well as numerous catalogs and online sites. In 2012, the company and assets were acquired by Ascena Retail Group.

== History ==
Charming Shoppes was founded in 1940, it went public in 1971, and was ranked 927th on the 2012 Fortune 1000. On May 2, 2012, Ascena Retail Group, the parent company of Dressbarn, announced that it would acquire Charming Shoppes with a $900 million transaction through a combination of cash in hand and $325 million of borrowings from credit facilities.

== Services and products ==
The Company's operation were divided into two segments: Retail Stores and Direct-to-Consumer.

- The Retail Stores segment derived its revenues from sales through retail stores and store-related e-commerce sales under its Lane Bryant (including Lane Bryant Outlet), Fashion Bug, and Catherines Plus Sizes brands.
  - Lane Bryant — A retailer of specialty plus-size fashion, Lane Bryant was acquired by Charming Shoppes in 2001. With more than 900 stores nationwide, Lane Bryant stores sell clothes for plus size women. In July 2006, Charming Shoppes launched Lane Bryant Outlet.
  - Catherines Plus — A plus-size specialty retailer with more than 500 stores throughout the country, the Catherines brand targets women 40–65 years old and sells clothing and accessories for career and casual wear.
- The Direct-to-Consumer segment derives its revenues from catalog sales and catalog-related e-commerce sales under its FIGI’S title, a leading food gift retailer. On Oct 16, 2013 the company announced that it had closed the sale of Figi's, to Mason Companies, Inc.

== Defunct brands ==
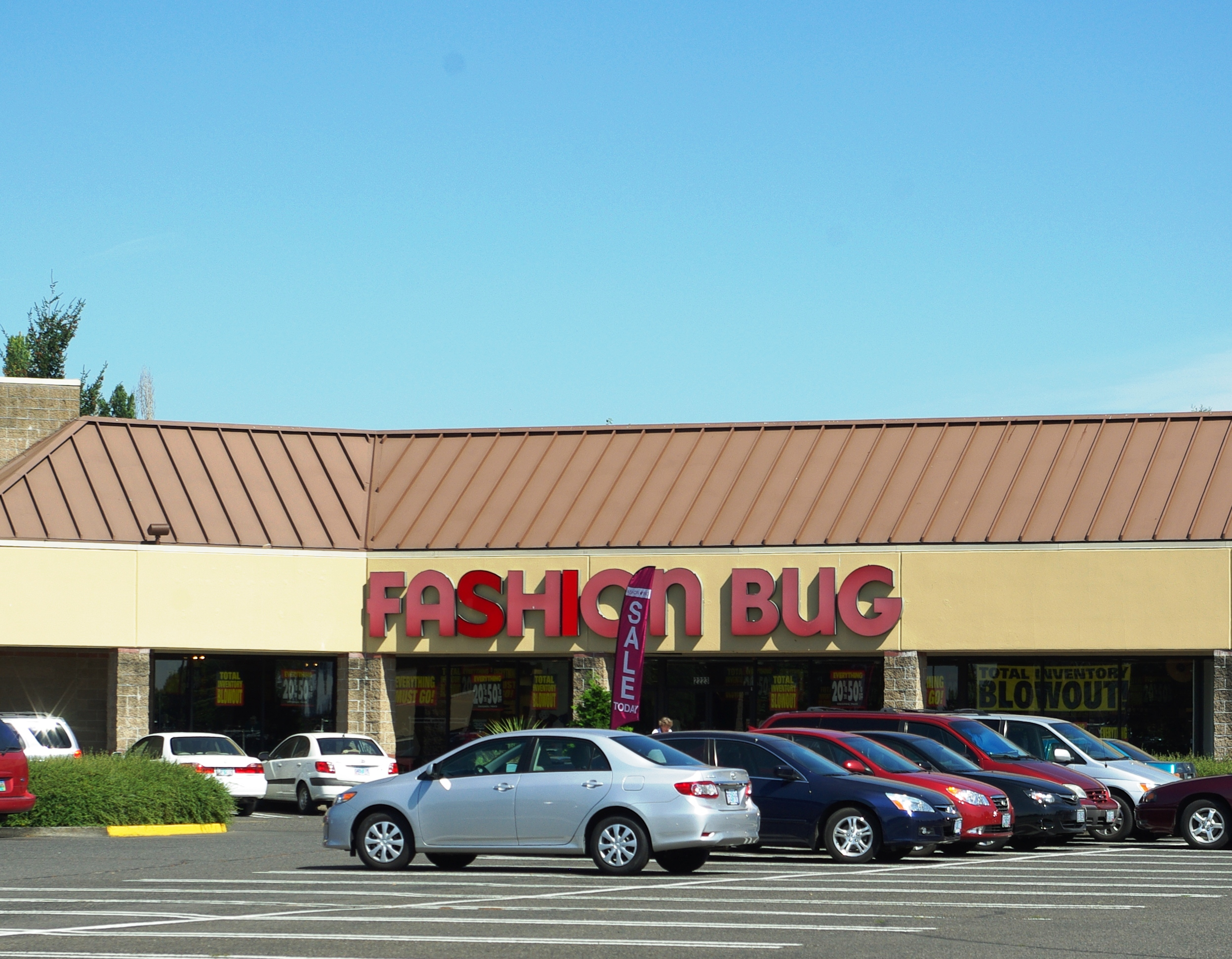
A Fashion Bug store at a strip mall in Hillsboro, Oregon

- Fashion Bug — Fashion Bug was the chain that founded Charming Shoppes—and, for many years, was their only brand. The chain, at one point, grew to over 1,200 stores nationwide. The stores sold women's fashion apparel and were located in strip shopping centers and malls, catering to middle and lower-class segments. It offered fashion apparel and accessories in plus, misses' and junior size ranges. In June 2012, Charming Shoppes announced that Fashion Bug stores would be closing; the final stores closed in February 2013.
- Added Dimensions and The Answer — Two chains which were acquired as part of Catherine's in January, 2000. These chains operated plus-size women's stores in the Northeastern and Southeastern US and had previously been a part of Virginia Specialty Stores, which was acquired by Catherines Inc. in 1992. Charming operated the 77-store chain until 2002, and then announced it would close 80% of the locations, and convert the remaining 20% into its Catherines brand.
- Modern Woman — Modern Woman was a 125-store chain of plus-size women's clothing stores, operating primarily in strip shopping centers in the US. The chain was acquired by Charming in 1999. The stores were mostly converted to the Catherine's Brand, and the remainders to the Fashion Bug Plus brand.
- PS...Plus Sizes, Plus Savings — These stores were created by Catherines Inc. in 1980 and acquired by Charming Shoppes when they acquired Catherines Inc. in January, 2000. The stores were converted to other Charming brands.
- Monsoon and Accessorize — Opened as a joint venture between Charming Shoppes Inc. and Monsoon plc of the UK, the partnership aimed to bring the 2 successful UK brands to traditional enclosed shopping malls in the US. Approximately 10 pilot locations were opened in malls in Virginia, New Jersey, New York and Pennsylvania in 2002. The partnership ended and the stores were shuttered in 2007.

== Sources ==
- Charming Shoppe's history and organization
- CNN Money snapshot
