= Lena Himmelstein =

American clothing designer and retailer

- Born: March 11, 1877; Kaunas, Lithuania
- Died: September 26, 1951 (aged 74); New York, New York, United States
- Label: Lane Bryant
- Spouses: David Bryant; Albert Malsin
- Children: 4

Lena Himmelstein Bryant Malsin (March 11, 1877 – September 26, 1951) was an American clothing designer and retailer who founded the plus-size clothing chain Lane Bryant. Despite difficult circumstances, she saw a need and came up with a solution that revolutionized the women's fashion industry.

== Early life and career ==
Lena Himmelstein was born to a Lithuanian Jewish family in Reteivas, Lithuania. She became an orphan shortly after birth as her mother died days after childbirth, and was then raised by her grandparents in Lithuania. In 1895, she sought refuge in New York City to join her sister Anna, where she found work in a sweat shop at $1 a week. In 1899, she married David Bryant, a Russian Jewish refugee. She moved to Harlem with her husband, who was a jeweler. He died not long after their son Raphael was born. She then lived on West 112th St. in Manhattan, supporting herself and her son by making and selling negligees and tea gowns from delicate laces and fine silks.

In 1904, Bryant moved to Fifth Avenue between 119th and 120th Streets. She rented a shopfront on the first floor of a building for $12.50 a month, with living quarters in the rear. She hung garments from the gas fixtures, and set up shop. Her sister's new husband lent her $300 to open a bank account as working capital for the purchase of fabrics. A bank officer misspelled her name on the application as "Lane", so that became the name of the store.

Bryant earned a reputation for the clothing she made for pregnant women. Bryant created a comfortable and concealing tea gown by attaching an accordion pleated skirt to a bodice using an elastic band. She had created the first known commercially sold maternity dress. Once she was able to advertise in newspapers in 1911, sales increased substantially. That year, she and her business partner husband, Albert Malsin, decided to expand into the "stout wear" category of clothing. Soon she expanded to a new shop at 19 W. 38th Street where she employed a dozen employees. Introducing a mail-order catalogue increased sales further so that the company's revenue was over one million dollars in 1917, the year Lane Bryant went public on the New York Stock Exchange. Her innovation of mass producing ready-made clothing for women in larger sizes spurred further growth—by 1923 Lane Bryant sales of plus-size fashion surpassed that of maternity wear.

== Marriage and family ==
In 1909, at age 32, she married Albert Malsin. Malsin was a fellow Lithuanian Jewish refugee like Himmelstein. A mechanical engineer with a degree from the Anhalt Polytechnic in Köthen, Germany, Malsin had worked for a firm that built amusement parks worldwide. Three more children, Theodore, Helen and Arthur, were born to the couple. Her son Raphael served as the company chairman and chief executive of Lane Bryant from 1940-1972, followed in that role by his half-brother Arthur.

== Personal life ==
Lena Bryant Malsin took an active role in Jewish communal charities. She supported the Hebrew Immigrant Aid Society, the New York Federation of Jewish Philanthropies, and a number of other causes. She died at her home in Manhattan on September 26, 1951, at the age of 74, leaving the business to her sons in her last will and testament. She was buried in Mount Pleasant Cemetery in Hawthorne (Westchester County), New York.
