= Lane Bryant =

American plus-size clothing retailer

Lane Bryant Inc.
- Type: Subsidiary
- Industry: Retail
- Founded: 1904; 122 years ago
- Founder: Lena Himmelstein
- Headquarters: New Albany, Ohio, United States
- Number of locations: 424 stores
- Products: Apparel, intimates and athleisure
- Parent: The Limited (1982–1999); Charming Shoppes (2001-2012); Ascena Retail Group (2012–2020); Premium Apparel LLC (affiliate of Sycamore Partners) (2021-Present)
- Website: www.lanebryant.com

Lane Bryant Inc. is an American women's apparel and intimates specialty retailer focusing on plus-size clothing. The company began in 1904 with maternity designs created by Lena Himmelstein Bryant Malsin. Lane Bryant, Inc., is the largest plus-size retailer in the United States. As of 2022, the chain consists of 448 stores in 46 U.S. states (only Alaska, Hawaii, Montana and Wyoming do not have Lane Bryant stores). Lane Bryant, Inc. is not affiliated with Lane Bryant catalog (Brylane, Inc.), which was spun off as a separate business in 1993.

== Beginning ==
Widowed at an early age, and the orphaned daughter of Lithuanian Jewish refugees, Lena Bryant supported herself and her young son as a dressmaker. Borrowing $300 from her brother-in-law, Bryant went to the bank to open an account. The bank officer misspelled her name on the application as Lane instead of Lena. In 1904, she rented a small storefront on Fifth Avenue with living quarters in the back for $12.50 a month. There she hung her garments from the gas fixtures and opened the doors.

Asked by one of her pregnant customers to design something "presentable but comfortable" to wear in public, Bryant created a dress with an elasticized waistband and accordion-pleated skirt. This would become the first known commercially made maternity dress. This dress was welcomed not only by middle-class women, but also by poorer pregnant women who had to work. The maternity dress soon became the best-selling garment in Bryant's shop.

== Early company challenges ==
When Bryant married Albert Malsin in 1909, he took charge of the business. He systematically began to develop and expand it. Albert instituted engineering exactness, and modern cost accounting and pricing. Sales had reached $50,000 a year by 1910 (equivalent to $1,700,000 in 2025). Albert was determined to steer the operation towards specialization. To produce in quantity and at lower cost he began to have dozens of dresses mechanically cut at once and employed high-speed sewing methods. Lane Bryant began supplying design pattern materials and financing for contractors.

Though Bryant came up with an innovative and commercially viable product, she had trouble getting the word out: Tradition dictated that topics like pregnancy were not discussed in the press. Her husband took on this challenge by convincing the New York Herald to accept advertising for their venture in 1911. When the paper did, the shop's entire stock sold out the next day.

Bryant saw another need just before World War I. Before then, there were no mass manufacturers of clothing in larger sizes for women. After measuring 4,500 of her own customers, as well as gathering information from about 200,000 other women, it was obvious that a new challenge had to be met. Bryant determined three types of stout women and designed clothing to fit each. Plus-sized clothing quickly eclipsed the maternity line, and by 1923, company sales reached $5 million (equivalent to $94 million in 2025).

== Mail order catalog ==
To bypass exclusion from the newspapers, the Malsins created the first mail order catalog for maternity wear. The mail order business was developed for the women preferring privacy about their "condition". By 1917, revenues from the catalog alone exceeded one million dollars (equivalent to $25 million in 2025). By 1919, their "stout catalog" had 52 pages and the "maternity catalog" had 76 pages.

== Other company innovations ==
Lena Bryant was a pioneer in other ways. Her customers were important to her, and customer relations and corporate philanthropy were high on her list. At her suggestion, Lane Bryant, Inc. worked with the Red Cross to replace any Lane Bryant customer's wardrobe destroyed in a disaster. After the 1947 Texas City Disaster in Texas City, Texas, the company outfitted 58 mail order customers whose homes were destroyed in the resulting fire.

Another concern was employee benefits. At a time when few companies offered anything more than wage, Lane Bryant offered profit sharing, pension, disability insurance, group life insurance plans, and medical benefits. By 1950, more than 3,500 employees participated in these pioneering concepts. Twenty-five percent of the stock issued when the company went public was reserved for employee subscription.

== Continued company growth ==
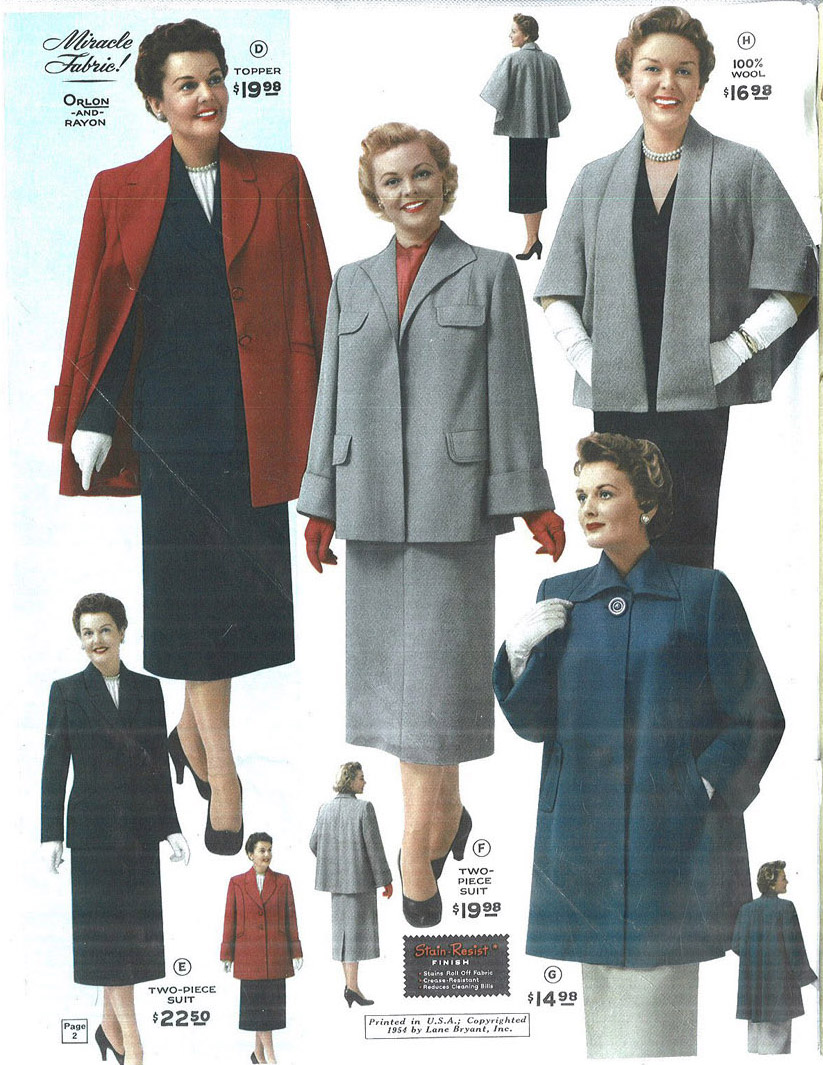
A page from the Lane Bryant Spring/Summer 1954 catalog

In 1915, the first branch retail store opened in Chicago. After her death in 1951, Bryant's sons took over the business. In 1961, Lane Bryant acquired Town & Country, a Pennsylvania-based discount department store. The Town & Country division was eliminated in 1977.

The Lane Bryant operations were purchased in May 1982 by The Limited founder Leslie Wexner.

== Today ==
The catalog operations were licensed to Brylane (now Redcats) in 1993. The retail operations were sold to Charming Shoppes, another owner of plus-size clothing stores, in 1999 for $335 million (equivalent to $647 million in 2025). Charming has since expanded the chain and introduced online and outlet sales. Lane Bryant's "sisters" include Fashion Bug and Catherines. In order to trade on the well-known Lane Bryant brand, Charming folded all of its store sites into the Lane Bryant domain; fashionbug.com and catherines.com redirect to fashionbug.lanebryant.com and catherines.lanebryant.com respectively. Today, Lane Bryant is a large retail chain, present in many shopping centers across the United States. In 2004, Lane Bryant opened a flagship store in New York near Fifth Avenue. Charming Shoppes regained the license for the catalog operations in late October 2007. In June 2012, Ascena Retail Group, parent company of Dressbarn, purchased Charming Shoppes with a $900 million transaction through a combination of cash on hand and $325 million of borrowings from credit facilities.

On July 23, 2020, the parent company of Lane Bryant and Ann Taylor filed for Chapter 11 bankruptcy, citing the COVID-19 pandemic and subsequent shutdowns as having “severely disrupted” its financial foundation. Stores with locations to be closed included Ann Taylor, LOFT, Lane Bryant and Lou & Grey stores, including all stores across brands in Canada, Puerto Rico and Mexico, as well as all Catherine Stores and a “significant number” of Justice stores. In December of the same year, Ascena Retail Group sold Lane Bryant, Ann Taylor and their related brands to Premium Apparel LLC, an affiliate of Sycamore Partners, for $540 million.

== Slogans ==
Old Lane Bryant logo (1980s–2014)

- What Real Women Wear (1995–2004)
- Bold. Modern. You. (2004–2010)
- Nobody fits you like Lane Bryant (2010–2012)
- #ImNoAngel, #PlusIsEqual, #ThisBody (2014–present)

== Advertising ==
In 2010, Lane Bryant accused Fox and ABC of censoring their 30-second ad spot during commercial breaks for Dancing with the Stars and American Idol. The ads featured plus-sized model Ashley Graham in their Cacique line of lingerie. Lane Bryant accused the networks of discrimination because they had no problem airing Victoria's Secret advertisements, with similarly clad models, in the same time slots.

In March 2016, Lane Bryant accused ABC and NBC of banning a 30-second lingerie ad featuring the tagline "This Body", which depicted mild nudity and breastfeeding.

== Designer collaborations ==
In the 1968 Catalog, Schiaparelli signed, imported hand rolled silk scarves sold for $6.00 USD each.

In 2013, Lane Bryant announced its first designer collaboration with designer Isabel Toledo and artist Ruben Toledo. For Holiday 2013 (December 2013), the duo produced a capsule collection with a logo tee and a tote bag featuring Ruben's sketches. In March 2014, their first full collection for Spring 2014 was launched. On March 20, 2014, a runway presentation was held in New York City, which was simulcast live online.

In March 2014, Lane Bryant announced their second designer collaboration with Sophie Theallet. Theallet produced lingerie and sleepwear for Lane Bryant's lingerie brand Cacique, which was released in Fall 2014 (September 2014).

== See also ==
- Lane Bryant shooting
