= Ann Inc. =

American clothing company

- Formerly: Ann Taylor Stores (1954–2011)
- Type: Subsidiary
- Traded as: NYSE: ANN
- Industry: Retail
- Founded: 1954; 72 years ago, in New Haven, Connecticut, U.S. (as Ann Taylor Stores)
- Founder: Richard Liebeskind
- Headquarters: Times Square Tower, New York City, New York, U.S.
- Key people: Ronald Hovsepian (chairman); Katherine Krill (president, CEO, and director; Michael Nicholson (EVP, CFO, COO, and treasurer)
- Revenue: ▼US$248.8 million (Q2 2014)
- Operating income: ▼US$54.9 million (Q2 2014)
- Net income: ▼US$32.7 million (Q2 2014)
- Total assets: ▼US$998.842 million (Q2 2014)
- Total equity: ▲US$474.618 million (Q2 2014)
- Number of employees: 19,900 (Jan. 2012)
- Parent: Ascena Retail Group (2015–present)
- Divisions: Ann Taylor; Loft; Lou & Grey; Ann Taylor Factory; Loft Outlet
- Website: Ann Inc. (corporate) www.anntaylor.com www.loft.com Lou & Grey

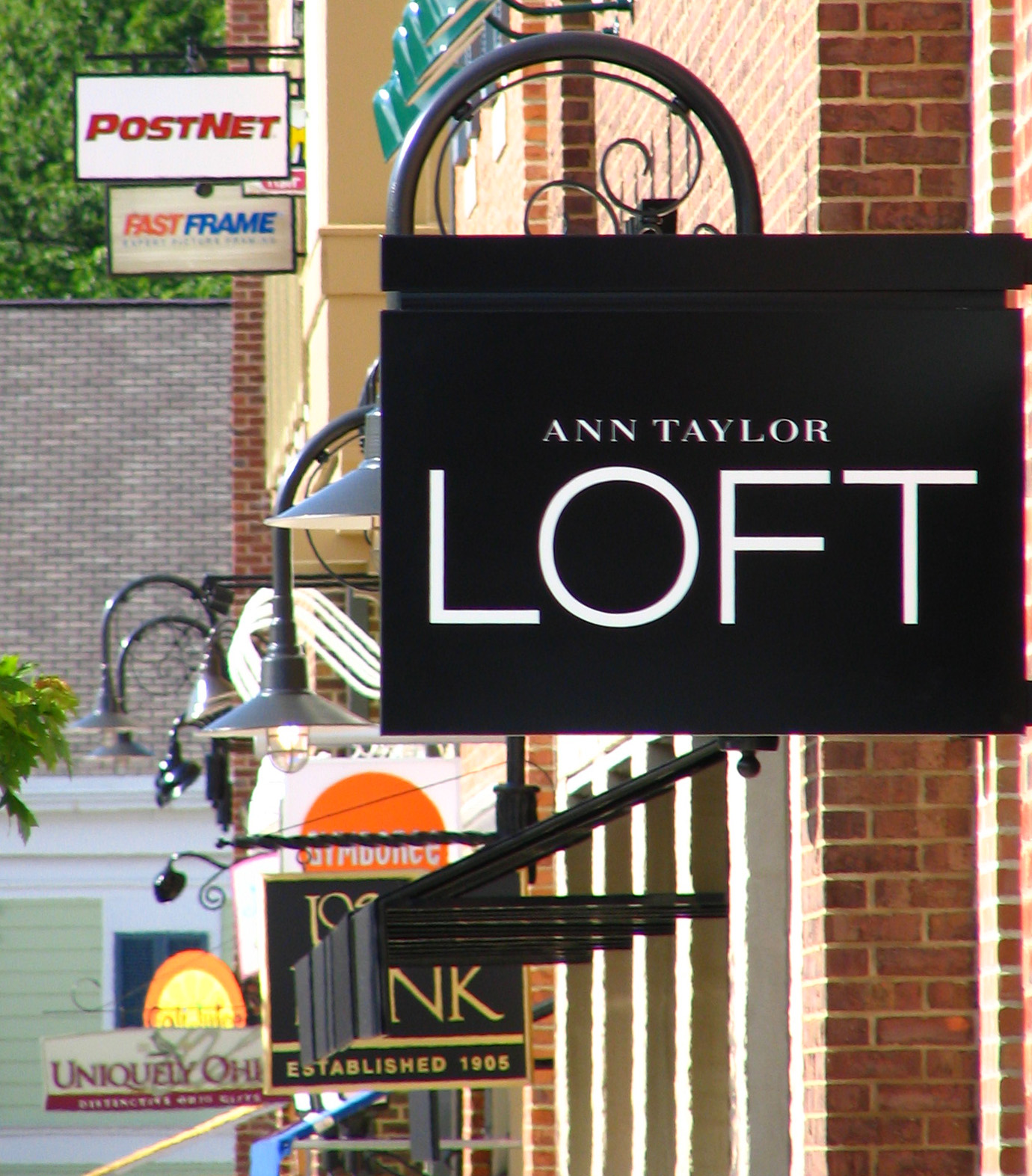
Loft sign in Hudson, Ohio

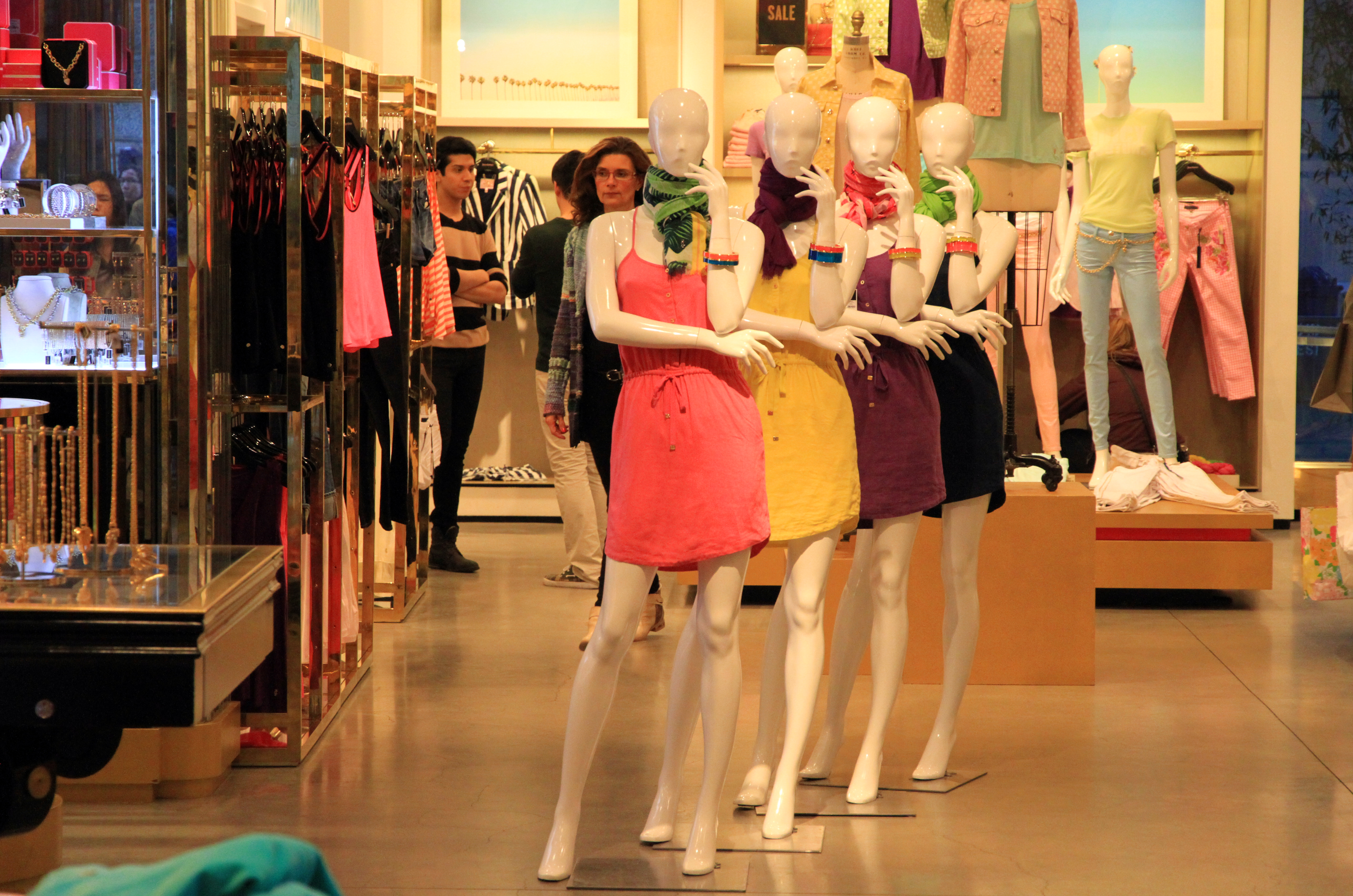
5th Avenue, NYC, 2013

Ann Inc. is an American group of specialty apparel retail chain stores for women. The company is headquartered in New York City and currently operates as a subsidiary of Ascena Retail Group. The stores offer classic-styled suits, separates, dresses, shoes and accessories. The brand is marketed under five divisions: Ann Taylor, Loft, Lou & Grey, Ann Taylor Factory, and Loft Outlet.

== History ==
Richard Liebeskind, the founder of Ann Taylor, opened his first Ann Taylor store in New Haven, Connecticut, in 1954. "Ann Taylor" was the name of a best-selling dress at Liebeskind's father's store. Both the best-selling dress and the name Ann Taylor were given by the father to his son, Richard Liebeskind, for good luck. Liebeskind decided to go with the name Ann Taylor because Ann was considered a very New England name, and Taylor evoked the image of tailored clothing. The name supposedly created the ideal identity of classic women's apparel.

In May 1991, the company completed an initial public offering resulting in aggregate net proceeds of approximately $166.5 million.

In March 2011, the company changed its name to Ann Inc., from Ann Taylor Stores Corporation. As of October 27, 2012, the total store count was 981: of 278 Ann Taylor stores, 101 Ann Taylor Factory stores, 510 Loft stores, and 92 Loft Outlet stores, as well as online at AnnTaylor.com and Loft.com.

On May 18, 2015, Ascena Retail Group announced a $2.16 billion acquisition of Ann Inc. The buyout was completed on August 21, 2015. Ann Inc. will operate as an Ascena Retail Group subsidiary going forward.

In 2017, Ann Taylor launched a subscription rental service called Infinite Style. Loft followed up in 2019 with Infinite Loft subscription, a size inclusive subscription business.

== Divisions ==
Ann Taylor is a small US chain of clothing stores for women. Clothing is targeted for fashion forward career women. Ann Taylor was founded in 1954.

Loft, originally Ann Taylor Loft, was established in 1996 as an extension of the original Ann Taylor brand, offers more relaxed fashions for work and home, in the "moderate" priced category. The selection provided at Loft initially was a more casual replica to that of the regular Ann Taylor; however, it has developed into its own brand, and now is known as a casual lifestyle brand. Loft also offers maternity clothing.

Lou & Grey is an athleisure and active-wear clothing brand launched by Ann Inc..

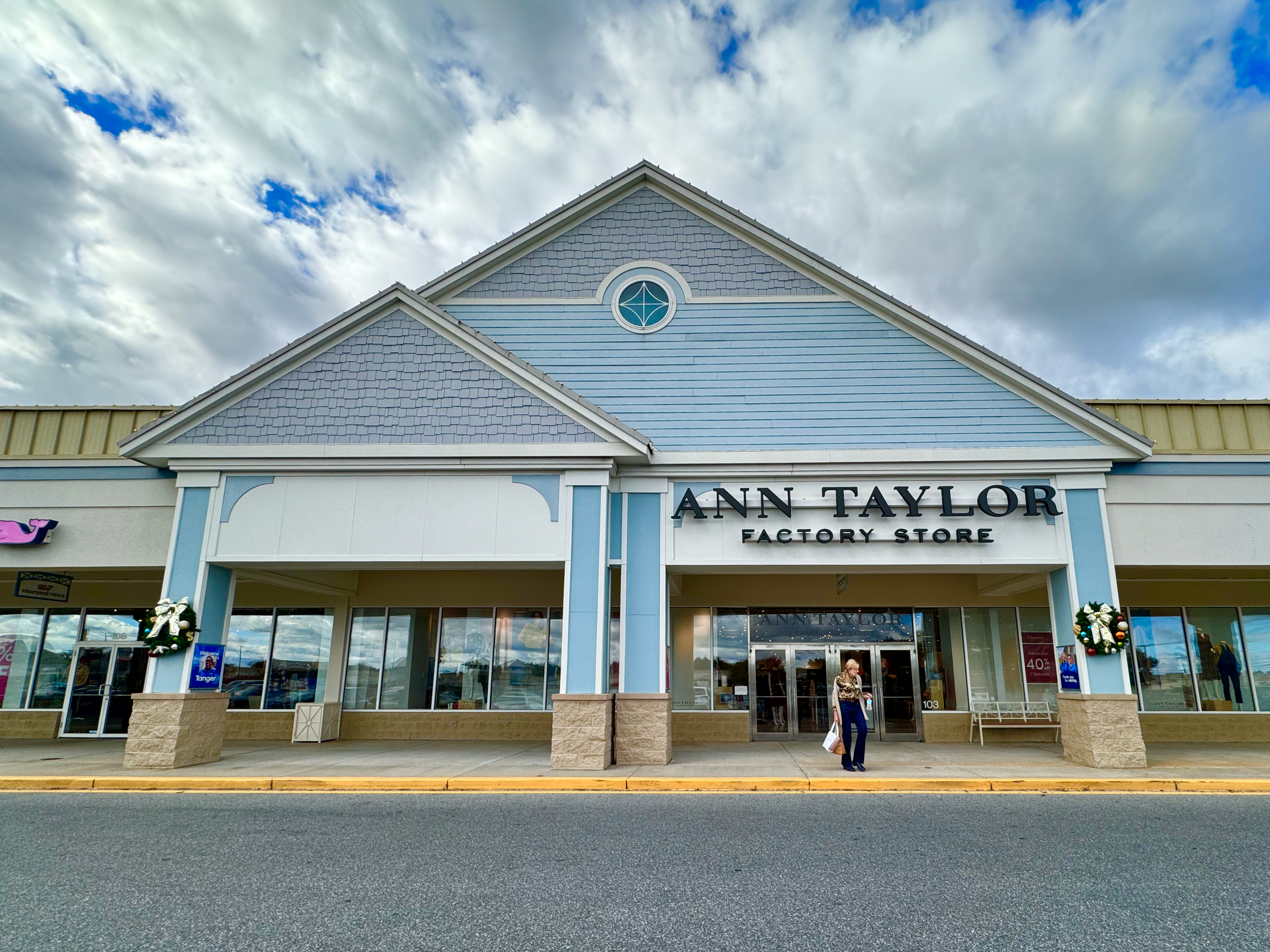
An Ann Taylor Factory store

Ann Taylor Factory offers merchandise inspired by Ann Taylor stores, but manufactured for Ann Taylor Factory.

Loft Outlet offers a Loft-based outlet environment, similar to the current Ann Taylor Factory stores, with unique Loft Outlet merchandise mirrored from popular and best-selling Loft products. There are currently 128 Loft Outlet stores throughout the United States.

== Special collections ==
Ann Taylor Celebrations was launched in August 2005; it is a signature collection featuring dresses, wraps, sashes, shoes, and bags. Each piece in the collection is dyed to match. The collection can be worn for occasions from wedding parties to black tie and special events. In 2009, this line began being offered online only and was phased out in 2011.

Ann Taylor Collections was launched 2007 and consists of luxury apparel, accessories, and shoes made using Italian made fabrics and yarns. The craftsmanship is of an elevated value and the price point is higher than other pieces. It is no longer produced.

Ann Taylor Beauty consists of fragrance and bath and body products that were to be available in all Ann Taylor stores beginning late 2007 or early 2008. The Possibilities fragrance was released in November 2007. The body care line consisted of body mist, lotion, and body wash, and came in six scents. It is no longer produced.

Loft Maternity was released in Summer 2007 under the motto "Because you have a LOFT to expect." While at first the LOFT Maternity line included only mid-range sizes, it expanded to include all Loft sizes (00–18) in Fall 2007. As of Summer 2010, LOFT Maternity operates exclusively online, using the tag line, "Clothes so stylish and comfortable you'll wish you could wear them for more than nine months."

== Flagship stores ==
Ann Taylor has two flagship locations:

- Store 0362: 645 Madison Avenue in New York City
- Store 0547: 600 North Michigan Avenue in Chicago, Illinois on the Magnificent Mile

The company also has a Loft flagship store:

- Store 1614: 1459 Broadway at Times Square in New York City

== Bankruptcy of Ascena ==
On July 23, 2020, Ascena, parent company of Ann Inc. filed for Chapter 11 bankruptcy, citing the COVID-19 pandemic and subsequent shutdowns as having "severely disrupted" its financial foundation. Stores with locations to be closed include Ann Taylor, LOFT, Lane Bryant and Lou & Grey stores, including all stores across brands in Canada, Puerto Rico and Mexico, as well as all Catherine Stores and a "significant number" of Justice stores.

== Emergence from bankruptcy ==
On Dec. 23, 2020, Ascena announced that it had completed the sale of the Ann Taylor, LOFT, Lou & Grey, and Lane Bryant brands to Premium Apparel LLC, an affiliate of private equity firm Sycamore Partners. Premium Apparel stated that it had committed to retaining a substantial portion of the retail stores, associates, and corporate operations affiliated with these brands.

== See also ==
- Retail apocalypse
- List of retailers affected by the retail apocalypse
