= KnitWell Group =

American clothing retail company

- Formerly: Ascena Retail Group, Inc. (2011-2023)
- Company type: Private
- Traded as: Nasdaq: DBRN (1982-2011); Nasdaq: ASNA (2011-2020); OTC Pink: ASNAQ (2020)
- Industry: Retail (women's clothing)
- Predecessor: Dressbarn
- Founded: February 13, 1962; 64 years ago, in Stamford, Connecticut, United States
- Founders: Roslyn Jaffe, Elliot Jaffe
- Headquarters: Mahwah, New Jersey, United States
- Number of locations: 2,764 (Feb. 2020)
- Area served: United States, Canada, Puerto Rico, Mexico
- Key people: Lizanne Kindler (CEO)
- Products: Women's clothing products (district stores for young women and older women)
- Revenue: ▼US$5.493 billion (2019)
- Operating income: ▼US$-782 million (2019)
- Net income: ▼US$-661 million (2019)
- Total assets: ▼US$ 2.7 billion (2019)
- Total equity: ▼US$ 151 million (2019)
- Owner: Sycamore Partners
- Number of employees: 53,000 (Aug. 2019)
- Subsidiaries: Ann Taylor; Cacique; Catherines; Lane Bryant; Lou & Grey; LOFT; Justice; Talbots
- Website: www.ascena.com

KnitWell Group is an American retailer of women's clothing. KnitWell is the parent company of Ann Inc., operator of Ann Taylor and Loft stores, and the Lane Bryant, Justice, and Talbots clothing store brands. A portfolio company of Sycamore Partners, the company was formerly known as Ascena Retail Group, Inc. until it merged with Talbots, another Sycamore portfolio company, to become KnitWell Group.

Prior to the Sycamore acquisition, Chairman Emeritus Elliot Jaffe and his wife and co-founder, Roslyn, own about 25% of the company.

== History ==
=== Founding and growth (1962–2019) ===
Ascena Retail Group logo

The first Dressbarn was opened in February 1962 in Stamford, Connecticut, by Roslyn Jaffe. Jaffe saw the opportunity to provide wear-to-work dresses and clothing for the working woman during a time when women were entering the workforce in greater numbers.

The company began trading on NASDAQ (symbol DBRN) in 1982. In January 2011, to reflect its broader holdings, the company was reorganized as a Delaware corporation named Ascena Retail Group, Inc. The company's NASDAQ symbol also changed to ASNA in 2011.

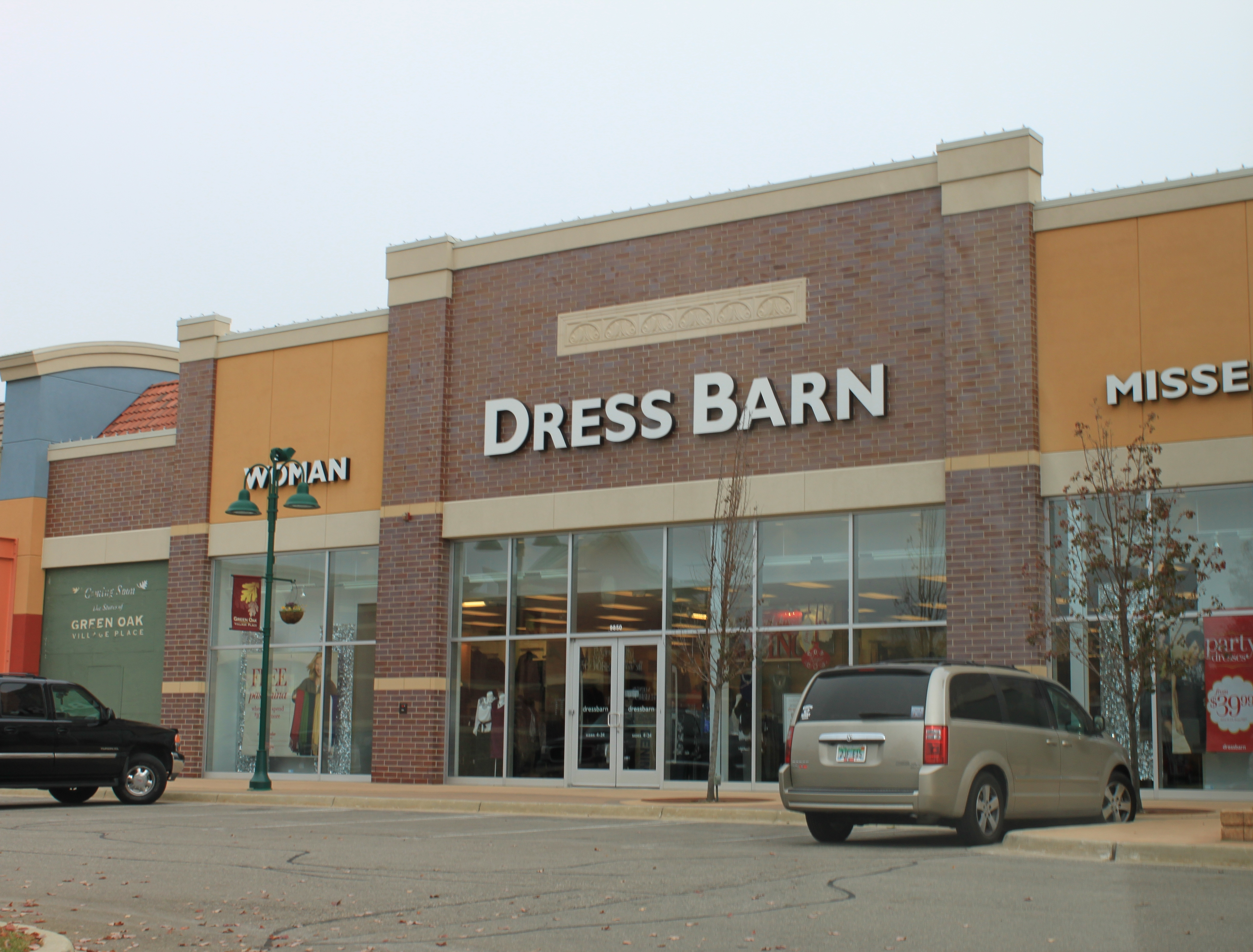
Dress Barn, Green Oak Village Place

In 2005, Ascena Retail Group acquired Maurices Inc. from American Retail Group. The name Ascena is derived from the previous parent company of Maurices, C&A Netherland. A.merican S.ervices C. en A. whereby "en" is "and" in Dutch.

In 2009, Ascena Retail Group expanded into the girls' clothing market by purchasing Tween Brands, the owner of the Justice chain of 891 stores. Justice, which is aimed at girls between ages 7 and 14, is the successor of Limited Too, originally launched in 1987 by The Limited. Limited Too changed its name to Tween Brands in 2008, and the company had almost completely converted its remaining Limited Too stores to Justice stores at the time of the Ascena acquisition.

In 2012, Ascena Retail Group acquired Charming Shoppes, which was the parent holding company for Lane Bryant, Cacique and Catherines Plus, for $900 million.

On May 18, 2015, Ascena Group agreed to a $2.16 billion acquisition of Ann Inc., the parent company of clothing retailers Ann Taylor and Loft. Ascena Group completed its acquisition of Ann Inc on August 21, 2015. Ann Inc. operates as an Ascena Group subsidiary.

On May 1, 2019, David Jaffe stepped down as Ascena's CEO and as chairman of the board after a 27-year tenure, although he retained a non-chair board seat. Ascena Brands president and CEO Gary Muto replaced Jaffe as Ascena Retail Group's CEO. Ascena president and Chief Operating Officer Brian Lynch also left the company on May 1.

On May 20, 2019, Ascena announced that it was closing all of its approximately 650 Dressbarn locations, which they did on December 26.

=== Pandemic and closures (2020–2021) ===
On July 23, 2020, the company filed for Chapter 11 bankruptcy and announced the closing of all Catherines and Lou & Grey stores, a significant number of Justice stores, and a select number of Ann Taylor, LOFT, and Lane Bryant stores. On November 11, 2020, Ascena Brands announced the closure of all remaining Justice stores as well as the online website after the brand was sold to Bluestar Alliance LLC. In December 2020, a study from Coresight Research found that of all American retailers, Ascena Retail had closed the most locations in 2020, at 1,200 closures of 8,400 in the country overall.

On December 23, 2020, Ascena announced that Sycamore Partners has completed its acquisition of Ann Taylor, LOFT, Lou & Grey and Lane Bryant brands. Ascena is now a privately held company owned by Sycamore Partners and no longer a publicly traded company and has emerged out of bankruptcy.

On January 4, 2021, Gary Muto stepped down as CEO of Ascena and in place Lizanne Kindler was named as the Executive Chair and Interim Chief Executive Officer of Ascena.

On August 30, 2023, Sycamore Partners announced the new KnitWell Group that would merge Talbots with the remaining Ascena Retail Group assets.
