= Maternity clothing =

Clothing for pregnant women

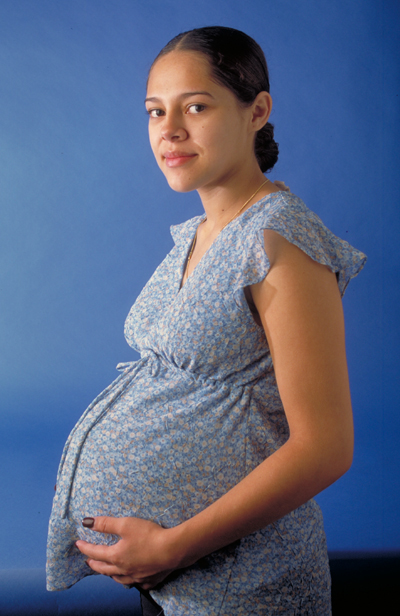
c. 2002 USA

Maternity clothing is worn by women as an adaptation to changes in body size during pregnancy. The evolution of maternity clothing began during the Middle Ages, and became fashionable as women became more selective about style and comfort in the types of maternity clothing they wore. Fashions were constantly changing over time, such as the high-waisted Empire silhouette style maternity dress that was fashionable at the turn of the 19th century, and the "wrapper" style dress of the Victorian era that a woman could simply wrap around herself and button up.

The commercial production of maternity clothing began at the start of the 20th century, and continued to evolve. During the 1990s in the U.S., relaxed laws such as the Family and Medical Leave Act, which was signed into law by President Bill Clinton, helped to protect the jobs of pregnant women, and served as a form of liberation that afforded women the freedom to wear fashionable maternity styles that emphasised their pregnancy.

== History ==
Evolution

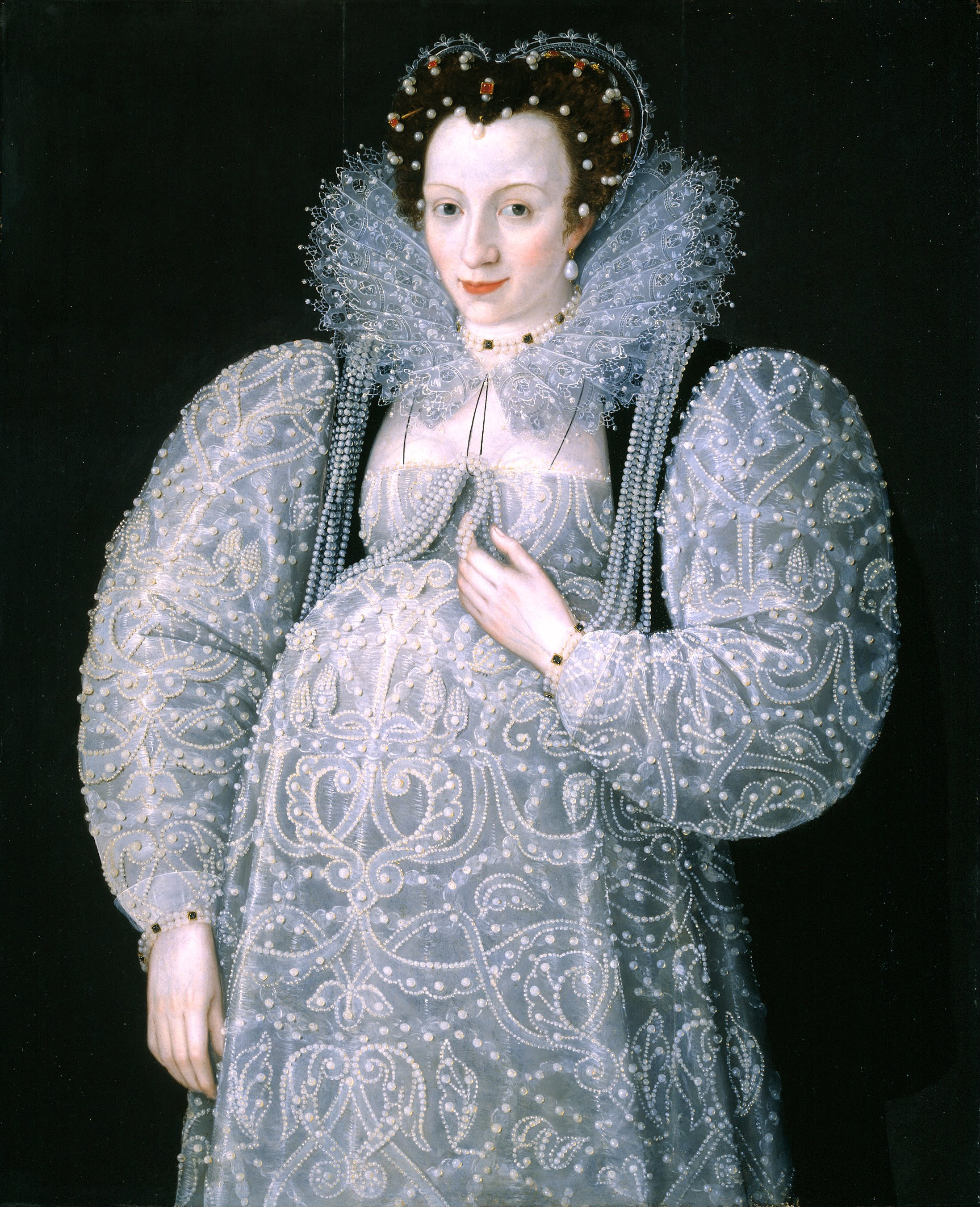
c. 1595 England

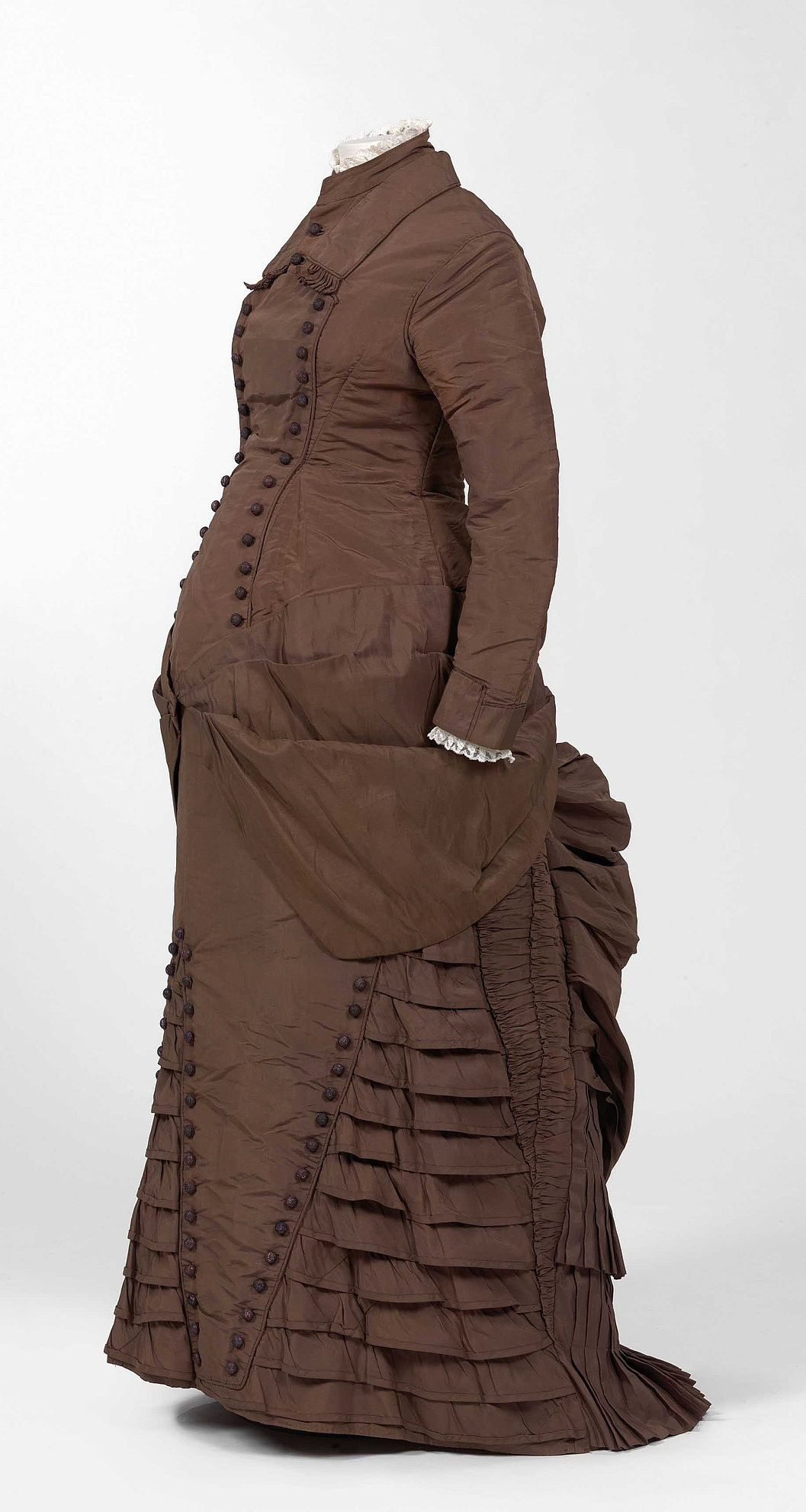
c. 1880 Belgium

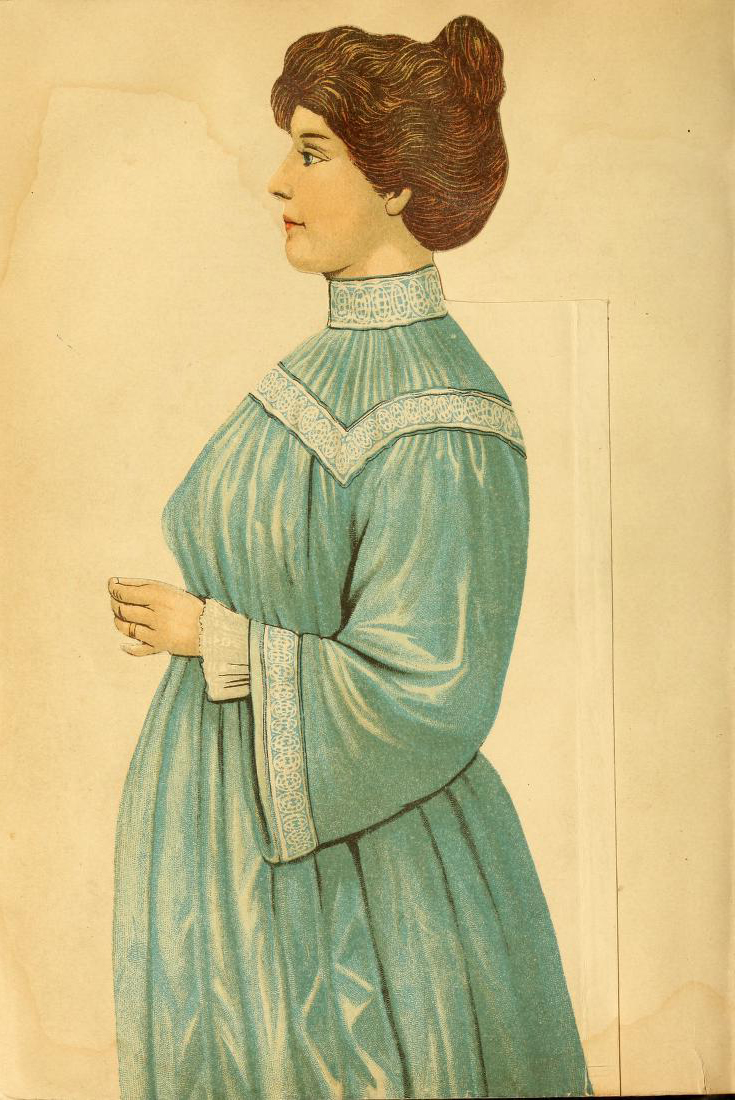
c. 1905 USA

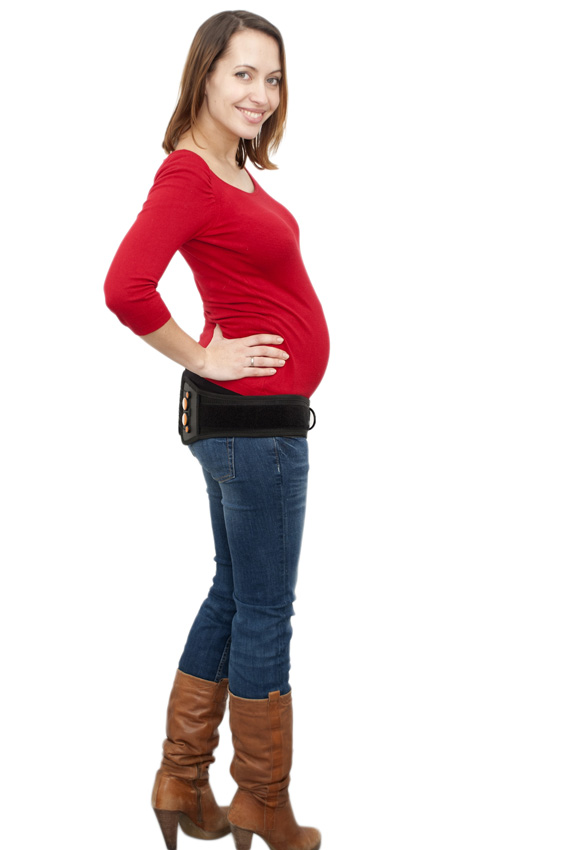
c. 2013 Germany

Dresses did not follow a wearer's body shape until the Middle Ages. When western European dresses began to have seams, affluent pregnant women opened the seams to allow for growth. During the Baroque period (roughly 1600s through the 1700s) the Adrienne, a waistless pregnancy gown with many folds, was popular. At that time women wore men's waistcoats. Some styles had laced vents in the back that allowed the wearer to adjust the girth of the coat as needed. From the 1790s through the early 1820s a style well-suited for pregnancy, the Empire waist, was popular. The Empire, a style which has a fitted bodice ending just below the bust and a loosely gathered skirt, was made popular by Napoleon's first wife Empress Joséphine. Bibs could be added to permit breastfeeding. The 1960s saw a revival of the Empire waistline which lasted for a few years as a general fashion, but remained popular for many years as pregnancy wear.

=== Victorian era ===
During the Victorian era, women spent more time in pregnancy compared to the 21st century, giving birth to an average of eight children with five making it through infancy. Queen Victoria herself had nine. Pregnancy was considered a private matter not to be discussed in "polite" conversation. A garment called a "wrapper" worn by women at home before they dressed for the day was well-suited for pregnancy as well since it wrapped around and could be worn loosely or more form-fitting as needed. At that time women were used to wearing corsets and maternity corsets with laces for adjustment were available.

High-waisted gowns remained in style until about 1830 but when waists returned to normal levels maternity wardrobe planning became more difficult. In the 1840s and 1850s a fan pleated bodice was popular. Some styles were gathered at the shoulder with a drawstring at the waist which could be let out as needed. Separates were introduced in the 1860s with boxy jackets and gathered center bodice panels. Some outfits had linings intended to lace over the belly for support. Fashion magazines showed maternity clothing, though the word "pregnancy" or similar was never mentioned, instead wording such as "for the recently married lady", or "for the young matron" was used.

=== 1900 to present ===
The first commercial ready-to-wear clothing for pregnant women was sold in the US by Lane Bryant in the 1900s. Lane Bryant offered shirtwaists with an adjustable drawstring waist, and dresses with an adjustable wrap-around front.

The next competitor, Page Boy, offered a patented skirt in 1937. By the 1930s, wrap-around skirts with a series of buttons were available, but the new Page Boy skirt was constructed with a window over the area of the expanding abdomen which allowed the hemline to remain stable rather than to hike up as the woman's abdomen increased in size. In later years when stretch fabric became available it was used to fill in the window. Their clothing, usually a slim skirt with a wide smock top, became fashionable during the 1950s after Lucille Ball popularized the style in the first TV episode to show a pregnant woman in 1952. Celebrities such as Jackie Kennedy and Elizabeth Taylor were later known for wearing Page Boy clothes.

Slacks with adjustable waists became widely available in the 1950s. An Aldens catalog from 1952 shows a pedal pusher and matching blouse outfit priced at $5.98. Designer blue jeans became available in the '80s.

== Cultural trends ==
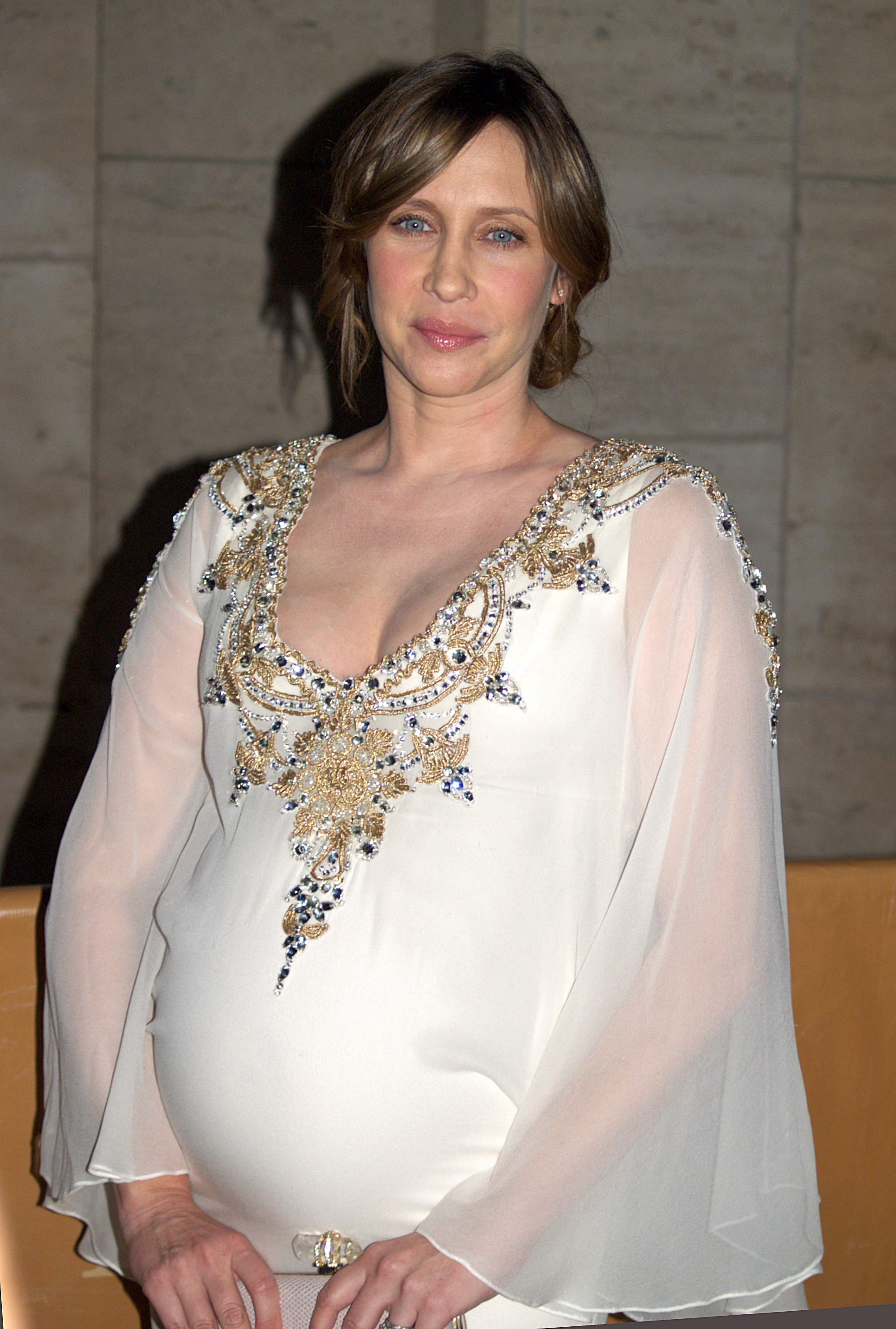
Vera Farmiga wearing formal evening wear at the Metropolitan Opera's 2010-11 Season Opening Night

Maternity clothes around the world have been undergoing significant changes. In both Eastern and Western cultures, there is greater demand for fashionable maternity clothes. In Western cultures the influence of celebrity culture. means that pregnant women in the public eye are taking the lead in maternity fashion. One such example is Demi Moore's 1991 Vanity Fair cover, which was one of the first instances of a magazine cover depicting an expectant mother. As a result, pregnant women are no longer trying to hide or disguise their "baby bumps", instead choosing to wear garments which closely fit their new shape, often emphasising the bust and abdominal area. Fashion bloggers have caught on to the shift in perception and began to regularly discuss new styles and fabrics designed with the pregnant form in mind. High-tech fabrics such as elastane are the material of choice for maternity wear in Western cultures as they allow garments to be form-fitting while allowing the abdominal area to expand as necessary.

Women in Eastern cultures, however, have maintained a much greater sense of modesty when it comes to maternity wear. In both the Islamic and Asian cultures, maternity wear is much less fitted, hemlines are longer and necklines higher. Modern Islamic maternity wear uses fabrics with brighter colours and bolder prints. Aside from cultural modesty, Chinese women have sometimes sought to hide their second pregnancy in less shapely clothes because Chinese policy has dictated that they can only have one child. In Chinese cultures, there is a fear of radiation from devices such as computers and mobile phones, especially during pregnancy. Even though there is no evidence to support this (according to WHO), Asian maternity wear is often manufactured from "anti-radiation" fabrics.

Culturally in the US today, a few popular clothing brands have made everyday wear for pregnant women both fashionable and accessible. As the body is changing shape and therefore levels of comfort, most maternity clothing is made with Lycra and elastic for stretch and growth. For pants, the waistband is usually a thick layer of stretchy material that can be hidden by a shirt to give the pants a normal look. Depending on style and activity, tops often billow out to leave room for the belly and are made of varying cottons and elastic materials.

As more women are pregnant when they marry, some manufacturers of maternity clothing and bridal gowns have begun producing wedding dresses that fit pregnant women.

== Military maternity uniforms ==
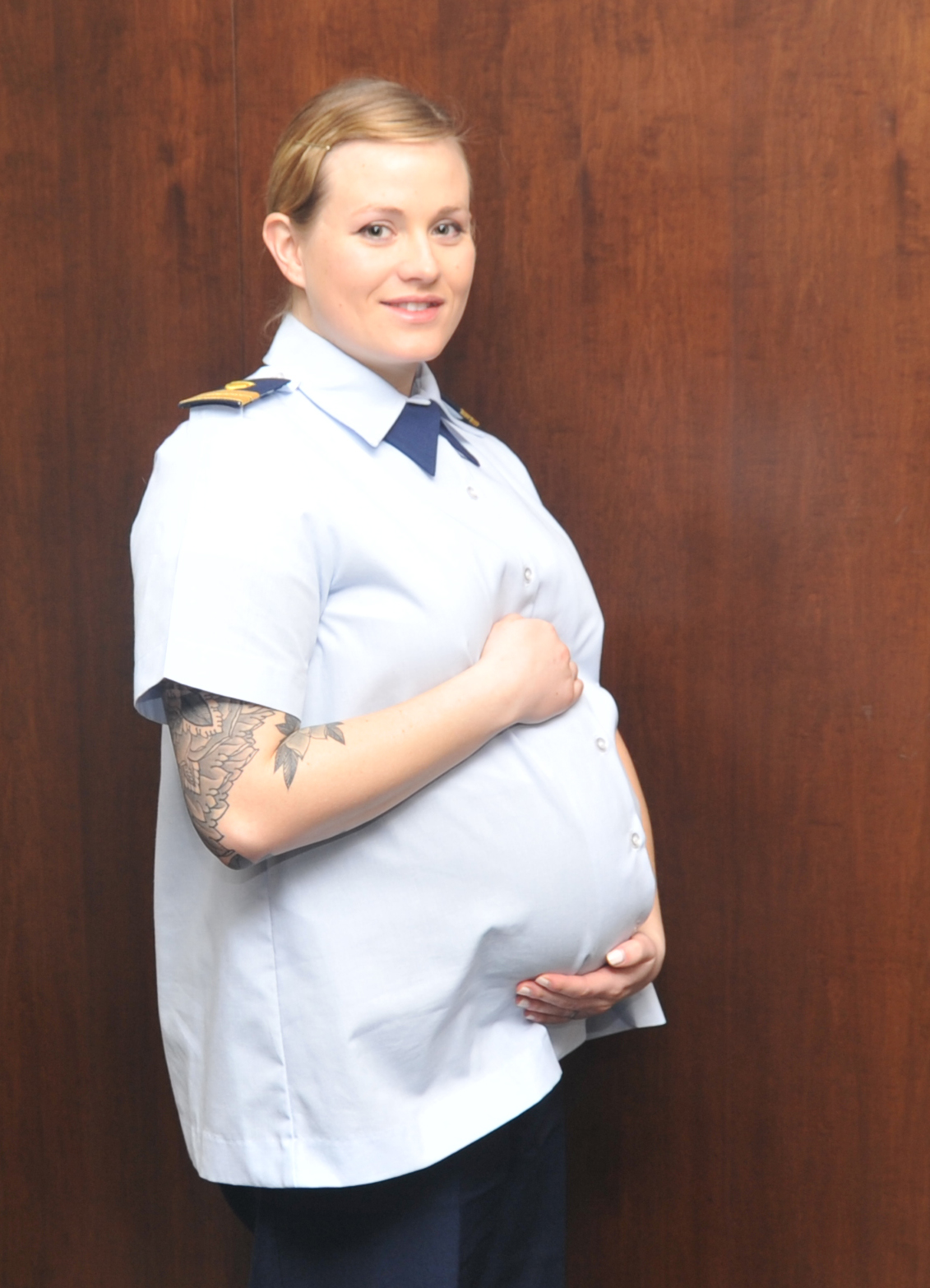
c. 2013 U.S. Coast Guard maternity

While women were integrated into the U.S. military in 1948, they were automatically discharged if they became pregnant. However, in the late 1970s it was decided that in order to keep women in an all-volunteer armed forces the military needed to change its policy regarding pregnancy. Following complaints that pregnant women dressed in civilian clothing undermined morale, between 1978 and 1980 the armed forces began to issue military maternity outfits. Writing about her experience working on the Armed Forces History Collections at the Smithsonian National Museum of American History, museum expert Bethanee Bemis wrote (in 2011):

"In the year since the beginning of the Military History Collections Inventory project, other members of the team and I have seen just about every type of military uniform we could conceive of. We have learned to identify branch, rank, even time period of different uniform pieces with relative ease, which is why we were surprised to come across a uniform unlike any we had seen before. It was a blue smock top paired with a white blouse and blue skirt, and it turned out to be a United States Air Force officer's maternity dress uniform."

Bemis wrote in 2011 that of the more than 6,000 military uniforms in their collection only three were maternity uniforms, an Air Force officer's uniform and two Navy Petty Officer Second Class uniforms. The Air Force dress uniform features a blue smock top paired with a white blouse and blue skirt, and the Navy uniforms include a blue coat and slacks with a white blouse for dress and a working uniform with dungaree pants and a chambray shirt. All three uniforms are from the 1980s.

Speaking at the International Women's Day celebration in March 2021, President Joe Biden spoke of the progress that the military has taken in recent years to better accommodate women in the military, including creating maternity flight suits and new better fitting body armor. Tucker Carlson, speaking on Fox News, showed a photo of an Air Force officer wearing an artificial pregnancy bump to demonstrate the design changes that made for the new Maternity Flight Duty Uniform and commented "So, we've got new hairstyles and maternity flight suits. Pregnant women are going to fight our wars. It's a mockery of the U.S. military." The Pentagon's top spokesman and senior generals rebuked Carlson's remarks. His comments also drew numerous social media responses from both male and female enlisted service members, some of whom noted that Tucker has never served. Army veteran Senator Tammy Duckworth, who lost both her legs during a deployment in Iraq and notably the first sitting senator to give birth while in office, responded to Carlson with a tweet referencing his brief appearance on Dancing with the Stars: "While he was practicing his two-step, America's female warriors were hunting down Al Qaeda and proving the strength of America's women."

== Legislative influences ==
Pregnancy fashions took a dramatic turn in the 1990s with the introduction of tight-fitted maternity wear intended to emphasize rather than hide a pregnant woman's baby bump. Not coincidentally, this shift occurred during a time of major changes for women in America. In 1993, the Family and Medical Leave Act was passed by President Bill Clinton. This act protected women's jobs during pregnancy, giving women more freedom to show off their pregnancies.

Until this act was passed, many women were fired as a result of their pregnancies. Following the passage of this legislation women had more job security and government-protected maternity leave. At the same time as these laws were being passed, maternity fashions changed drastically. Many magazine articles began to discuss stylish mothers-to-be wearing figure hugging clothing that emphasized their growing waistline.

== Cost and economics ==
Historically maternity clothing has not generally been considered a potentially profitable area for most major clothing manufacturers due to a belief that many women would not purchase clothes intended for only a few months of wearing. Declining birth rates have also reduced sales. However, with wide media interest in celebrity pregnancies beginning in the late 1990s, the maternity wear market grew 10% between 1998 and 2003. It was also during this time that the term "pregnant chic" was developed in order for companies to market to pregnant women. One clothing source said the demand for maternity clothes was growing because "Nowadays women are working during pregnancy, and travelling, and going to the gym, so their clothing needs are greater and more diverse."

In 2015 it was reported that maternity clothes is a $2.4 billion market in the U.S. According to a Forbes analysis, in 2014 a pregnant woman spent around $480 on maternity wear. This represents approximately one-sixth of all clothing sales each year. The largest chains, belonging to Destination Maternity, control almost one-fifth of the American market. Other brands are sold through discount stores, department stores, and boutiques.

Maternity clothing is generally worn only during the second and third trimesters, and possibly for several weeks or months after the birth of the baby while a woman regains her pre-pregnancy size. If a woman expects to be pregnant only once or twice, buying maternity clothing that will be worn only for about six months, can be considered expensive. Women who cannot afford or don't want to spend large amounts of money on maternity clothing may choose to just wear either larger, looser clothing or buy secondhand maternity clothes via yard sales and also consignment clothing stores. Also, some products, such as button extenders or Ingrid & Isabel's Bellaband wrap, are intended to work with the woman's non-maternity clothing, to reduce the need for specialized clothing.
