= Dressbarn =

Women's clothing retailer

- Company type: Subsidiary
- Industry: Retail (women's clothing)
- Founded: February 13, 1962 (Stamford, Connecticut)
- Founder: Roslyn Jaffe
- Key people: Tai Lopez (2023)
- Products: Women's apparel
- Owner: Retail Ecommerce Ventures
- Website: dressbarn.com

Dressbarn is an online retailer that specializes in women's casual dresses, leisure wear, accessories, and workwear. The company was founded as Dress Barn and operated retail stores between the early 1960s and late 2010s. In 2020, it became a brand owned by the private equity firm Retail Ecommerce Ventures (REV) and branded as dressbarn.

== History ==
The first Dress Barn (originally two words) was opened in February 1962 by Roslyn Jaffe in Stamford, Connecticut. Jaffe stocked wear-to-work dresses and women’s clothing during an era of women entering the workforce in greater numbers.

Dress Barn began trading on NASDAQ (symbol DBRN) in 1982. In January 2011, to reflect its broader holdings, the company was reorganized as a Delaware corporation named Ascena Retail Group, Inc., with its NASDAQ symbol changed to ASNA in 2011. As part of the reorganization, the name was shortened to Dressbarn (stylized in all-lowercase).

On May 21, 2019, Ascena Retail Group announced that it would eliminate Dressbarn's brick-and-mortar format and would be spun off. Dressbarn was acquired by the private equity firm Retail Ecommerce Ventures. In March 2023, Retail Ecommerce Ventures announced that it would be exploring options in effort to save themselves, including a potential Chapter 11 bankruptcy filing. They have also hired restructuring lawyers in effort to stave off bankruptcy.
