= Sycamore Partners =

American private equity firm

- Type: Private
- Industry: Private equity
- Founded: 2011; 15 years ago
- Founders: Stefan Kaluzny; Peter Morrow
- Headquarters: Solow Building, New York City, New York, U.S.
- Key people: Stefan Kaluzny; Peter Morrow
- Products: Leveraged buyouts, special situations, distressed buyouts
- Number of employees: 11–50
- Website: sycamorepartners.com

Sycamore Partners is an American private equity firm based in New York specializing in retail and consumer investments. The firm has approximately $10 billion in aggregate committed capital.

== History ==
=== Founding ===
Sycamore Partners was founded in 2011 by Stefan Kaluzny and Peter Morrow. Before Sycamore, Kaluzny was a managing partner at Golden Gate Capital and was employed since the firm's inception. Prior to joining Golden Gate, he co-founded Delray Farms, Inc. and also served as its chief executive officer. Morrow served as a Principal at Golden Gate before co-founding Sycamore.

== Holdings ==
=== Current ===
- CommerceHub
- Staples and Staples Canada (acquired 2017)
- Pure Fishing (acquired January 2019)
  - Brands include: ABU Garcia, All Star, Berkley, Chub, Fenwick, Greys, Hardy, Hodgman, Johnson, JRC, Mitchell, Penn, Pflueger, Plano Molding Sebile, Shakespeare, SpiderWire, Stren, and Ugly Stik.
  - In February 2022, Pure Fishing acquired Svendsen Sport, a Denmark-based fishing tackle company and brand owner, which owns specialist brands including Savage Gear, Prologic, Madcat, and DAM.
- Belk (acquired 2015)
- Hot Topic (acquired 2013)
- MGF Sourcing, formerly known as Mast Global Fashions (acquired 2011)
- NBG Home (acquired 2017)
- Talbots (acquired 2012)
- The Limited (acquired 2017)
- Torrid (acquired 2013)
  - In July 2021, Sycamore Partners sold off 25.2% of the company to the public. It is currently traded on the New York Stock Exchange (NYSE) under the "CURV" symbol. Sycamore Partners currently owns 74.8% of the company.
- Premium Apparel LLC (affiliate used to acquire brands from Ascena Retail Group in December 2020.)
  - Ann Taylor
  - Lane Bryant (Cacique)
  - LOFT
  - Lou & Grey
- Azamara Cruises (acquired 2021)
- Margaritaville at Sea (acquired 2023)
- Rona Inc. (acquired 2023)
- Playa Bowls (acquired 2024)
- Walgreens (acquired 2025)

=== Former ===
- EMP Merchandising sold to Warner Music Group in 2018.
- Nine West Holdings (2013–2018)
  - Jones New York sold to Authentic Brands Group in 2015.
  - Nine West sold to Authentic Brands Group in 2018.
  - Bandolino sold to Authentic Brands Group in 2018.
  - Kurt Geiger Acquired by Jones Apparel Group in 2011. Sold to Cinven in 2015.
  - Stuart Weitzman sold to Coach, Inc. (now known as Tapestry, Inc.) in 2015.
- Coldwater Creek (2014–2020) assets sold to Hong Kong procurement company Newtimes Group in 2020.
- Express, Inc. (January 2021)

== Recent investments ==
In 2011, Sycamore acquired a 51% stake in MGF Sourcing, finally completing the total takeover in 2015.

In 2012, the firm acquired Talbots for $391 million.

In 2013, Sycamore acquired Hot Topic and Torrid for $600 million.

In 2014, the firm acquired Coldwater Creek. The firm also acquired Jones New York in 2014, for $2.2 billion, which was then sold to Authentic Brands Group in 2015. Kurt Geiger which was then sold to Cinven in 2015. Sycamore also sold the Stuart Weitzman business to Coach, Inc. in 2015 for $574 million.

In 2015, the firm acquired Belk, Inc for $3 billion, and EMP Merchandising, whilst divesting from Pathlight Capital.

In 2017, Sycamore's Nine West Holdings acquired Kasper. and Sycamore Partners purchased NBG Home. The firm then went onto win the bid for The Limited, bidding $26.8 million. In June 2017, Reuters reported that Staples Inc. had agreed to sell itself for $6.9 billion. Sycamore also sold Dollar Express LLC to rival Dollar General. Dollar Express LLC owned over 300 former Family Dollar stores acquired as part of Dollar Tree's acquisition of Family Dollar,

In July 2020, it was announced that Sycamore Partners had made a $1.75 billion offer to acquire department store chain and competitor JCPenney out of bankruptcy, and would rebrand 250 JCPenney stores to the Belk name, to help the chain compete directly with Macy's. Under the plan, the remaining JCPenney stores will be liquidated. The plan was not selected.

In January 2021, Sycamore Partners bought Azamara Cruises from the Royal Caribbean Group.

On March 16, 2022, it was announced the Sycamore and Hudson's Bay Company are preparing bids to buy Kohl's.

On November 3, 2022, Lowe's announced that it has entered into a definitive agreement to sell its Canadian retail business to Sycamore Partners.

On September 28, 2023, Sycamore signed an agreement to acquire Fort Myers, Florida–based Women's apparel retailer Chico's FAS for $938.1 million. As of July 29, 2023, Chico's runs 1,258 U.S. stores, and sells through 58 franchise locations in Mexico and two domestic airport franchises.

On March 7, 2025, it was announced that Sycamore Partners was acquiring Walgreens Boots Alliance for about $10 billion, or $11.45 per share. The transaction was completed on August 28, 2025.

In a post on Bluesky, US Senator Bernie Sanders shared an open letter sent to Sycamore Partners founder and managing director Stefan Kaluzny, addressing Sycamore removing holiday pay & time off for holidays, including Thanksgiving, Christmas, and New Years Day. Sanders said: "Sycamore Partners is forcing workers to sacrifice their basic needs for private equity profit."
