= Howald (disambiguation) =

Howald (Luxembourgish: Houwald), a town in the commune of Hesperange, Luxembourg.

Howald or Houwald may also refer to:

- Howald (surname)
- Houwald family, a German noble family

== See also ==
- Hohwald
- Howaldt family
