= Harry Leibowitz =

American businessman

- Born: c. 1941 (age 84–85); Brooklyn, New York, United States
- Education: Brooklyn College (CUNY) and Wayne State University
- Occupations: Business executive, philanthropist
- Years active: 1970s–present
- Known for: Co-founding the World of Children Award in 1998
- Spouse: Kay Isaacson-Leibowitz
- Children: 2
- Website: www.worldofchildren.org

Harry Leibowitz is a retired American businessman and Founder and co-chair of the World of Children Award.

== Early life ==
He grew up in Brooklyn, New York. He began working long hours as soon as he became a teenager and at an early age developed an appreciation for the plight of children born into challenging circumstances.

== Career ==
Harry went on to a career in business, serving in senior executive positions at companies such as Procter & Gamble and ESMARK, and also running his own marketing consultancy.

== Philanthropy ==
In 1996, Harry conceptualized the World of Children Award program when he was recovering from cancer surgery at age 55. This is when he decided to create a Nobel Prize for Children Awards program to support social changemakers helping children in need around the world.

Harry’s philanthropic honors include the Procter & Gamble Alumni Humanitarian Award in 2007, the Reclaiming Youth International Child Advocacy Award in 2006 and the Starr Commonwealth Child Advocacy Award in 1999. He is also featured in Kenneth Cole’s 2009 book, Awearness: Inspiring Stories on How to Make a Difference.

== Personal life ==
Harry Leibowitz is married to Kay Isaacson-Leibowitz, Co-Founder and Co-Chair of World of Children Award. Kay is a senior retail executive currently serving as an Independent Director on the Boards of Coldwater Creek and Guess (NYSE) Kay has served as an Executive Vice President for Victoria's Secret Stores and as acting President and Senior Vice President of Merchandising for Banana Republic. She has also served as Chairman of the Advisory Board for City University of New York Honors College.

In addition to her leadership with World of Children Award, Kay spent time working with Brian's House, a home for children with AIDS in Dallas, Texas and served as a board member for Chances For Children, a philanthropy founded by The Duchess of York.
