= Casual Corner =

American retailer

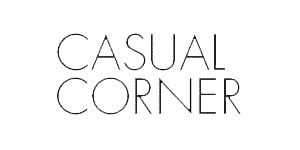
- Final logo used by the chain
- Industry: Retail
- Founded: 1950; 76 years ago
- Founders: Stanley W. Vogel; Charles E. Carples
- Defunct: 2005; 21 years ago
- Fate: Liquidation
- Headquarters: West Hartford, Connecticut, United States
- Number of locations: (formerly) 500+
- Area served: U.S.
- Products: Apparel
- Owner: Luxottica
- Subsidiaries: Petite Sophisticate; August Max Woman

Casual Corner was an American retail clothing chain founded in 1950. It operated stores under the names Casual Corner, Petite Sophisticate and August Max Woman brands, among others, with more than 525 stores at its peak.

== History ==
In 1950, childhood friends Charles E. Carples, a Sage-Allen manager, and Brown-Thomson buyer Stanley W. Vogel each borrowed $5,000 (~$52,000 in 2024) to co-found Casual Corner, opening its first retail store that April Fools Day in West Hartford, Connecticut. The first shop was 750 sq ft (70 m^{2}) and used poles, beams, and nets from old tobacco barns, and employed the founders' spouses as staff.

Casual Corner broke tradition with retail conventions of the day, allowing women to physically browse clothing and try on items in fitting rooms, rather than encasing apparel behind glass. The store's name was chosen, in part, to reflect a more casual shopping experience than was typical of the era.

Throughout the 1950s. each store displayed the following poem near its front door:

Come in and browse and tarry and chat

Casual Corner is meant just for that

Come in and leisurely look awhile

And find here what’s good and fine in style

And if you wish your business we’ll tend

Come in as a stranger—leave as a friend.

Early Casual Corner logos and icons featured a cartoon-like rendition of a Dalmatian dog.

In the late 1950s, brothers William "Bill" Miller and Irving Kent Miller acquired the rights to open Casual Corner stores in cities throughout the state of Texas, including Houston, Dallas, San Antonio, Waco, Midland, Abilene, Lubbock, and McAllen. These stores were all designed around a traditional upscale country theme, featuring fine early American furnishings, fixtures and trim, a fireplace, coffee station, New Yorker magazines, and dress forms as mannequins. The Texas chain remained intact until the late 1960s, once shopping plaza/center retailers began migrating to the newer supermalls.

In its first year, company sales were $45,000; a decade later, annual revenue had increased to $2 million. In 1969, annual sales were reported as $14 million. Casual Corner was sold to United States Shoe Corporation (U.S. Shoe) in 1970, when the chain included 20 stores. Cofounder Vogel became president of the company's specialty retail division, retiring a decade later.

A year after acquisition by U.S. Shoe, the chain opened its twenty-fifth store and continued to grow rapidly after that. Many of the original stores were constructed by George Zunner III of West Hartford, including those in Warwick and Providence, Rhode Island; Boston and Springfield, Massachusetts; Buffalo, New York; and at least one store in Ohio.

Under U.S. Shoe's ownership, Casual Corner became the foundation of a larger holding company, Women's Specialty Retailing Group. During its market height, in 1989, US Specialty Retailing included over 1,500 stores nationwide.

In April 1995, Luxottica purchased U.S. Shoe for $1.4 billion with the goal of acquiring its LensCrafters division; losses of US$22 million were reported that second quarter. In October 1995, Luxottica spun off the Women's Specialty Retailing Group, renamed Casual Corner Group, to Italian-controlled pLa Leonardo Finanziaria S.r.l., a Delaware company operated by Luxottica founder Leonardo Del Vecchio and his family. With 525 stores operating in 2000, Casual Corner closed its remaining locations in late 2005, after selling them to a liquidator, due to increased competition.

== Brands and market ==
The chain's original merchandise was women's sportswear. In the early 1960s, the stores primarily featured high quality clothing and accessories from the following manufacturers: The Villager, Ladybug (Juniors division of The Villager), Glen of Michigan, Cole of California (swimwear), Bernardo (sandals), Collins of Texas (handbags), and Vera (scarves). These lines collectively reflected Casual Corner's distinctive look of the early 1960s; tailored cotton shirtdresses, Peter Pan collars, pin-tucked blouses, fine cotton and dyed-to-match woven and knit wool separates, jute-and-leather belts, and trendy hand-jeweled wooden purses.

By the 1990s, Casual Corner pivoted to target working women. Under the Women's Specialty Retailing Group, the company owned and operated Casual Corner, Casual Corner Annex, August Max, Sophisticated Woman (subsequently merged and rebranded as August Max Woman), Petite Sophisticate, Ups & Downs, Caren Charles, Dolce Perla, and J. Riggings, a menswear store, which it sold in 1987.
