= Vince Camuto =

American footwear designer

- Born: June 4, 1936; New York, New York, U.S.
- Died: January 21, 2015 (aged 78); Greenwich, Connecticut, U.S.
- Spouse: Louise Camuto

John Vincent "Vince" Camuto (June 4, 1936 – January 21, 2015) was an American women's footwear designer and shoe industry executive, best known for co-founding the women's fashion brand Nine West. Following the 1999 sale of Nine West to Jones Apparel Group for $900 million, Camuto became CEO and Chief Creative Officer of a new fashion company, Camuto Group, maker of the Jessica Simpson brand. On October 10, 2018, Vince Camuto was acquired by Authentic Brands Group, as part of the company's definitive agreement to purchase a majority stake in the intellectual property of the Camuto Group's proprietary brands in partnership with DSW Inc.

== Biography ==
=== Early years ===
John Vincent Camuto, commonly known as "Vince," was born June 4, 1936, in New York City. Vince's father, Luigi Camuto, was an artisan who immigrated from Sicily and died when Vince was two years old. His mother, Louise Zenga Camuto, worked as a seamstress to support the family.

Camuto attended Seward Park High School in New York City and began working at an I. Miller Department Store at the age of 18, working first at shoe repair before moving to a position in sales.

Camuto went to work for the Sudbury Shoe Company in the early 1960s, entering the world of shoe manufacturing for the first time. He was instrumental in helping to turn around one of the company's floundering factories, located in Farmington, Maine.

In 1968, Camuto met fellow shoe industry professional Jerome "Jack" Fisher aboard an airplane. The pair decided to go into business together, initially working with Japanese import giant Sumitomo Corporation to develop shoe manufacturing in Brazil for the Japanese market. The experience was revelatory for Camuto, who later recalled:

The minute I walked into those factories in Brazil, my eyes opened as wide as could be. I couldn't believe the size of these factories — and that they were empty. With some infrastructure and money, I knew there was so much potential.

=== Nine West ===
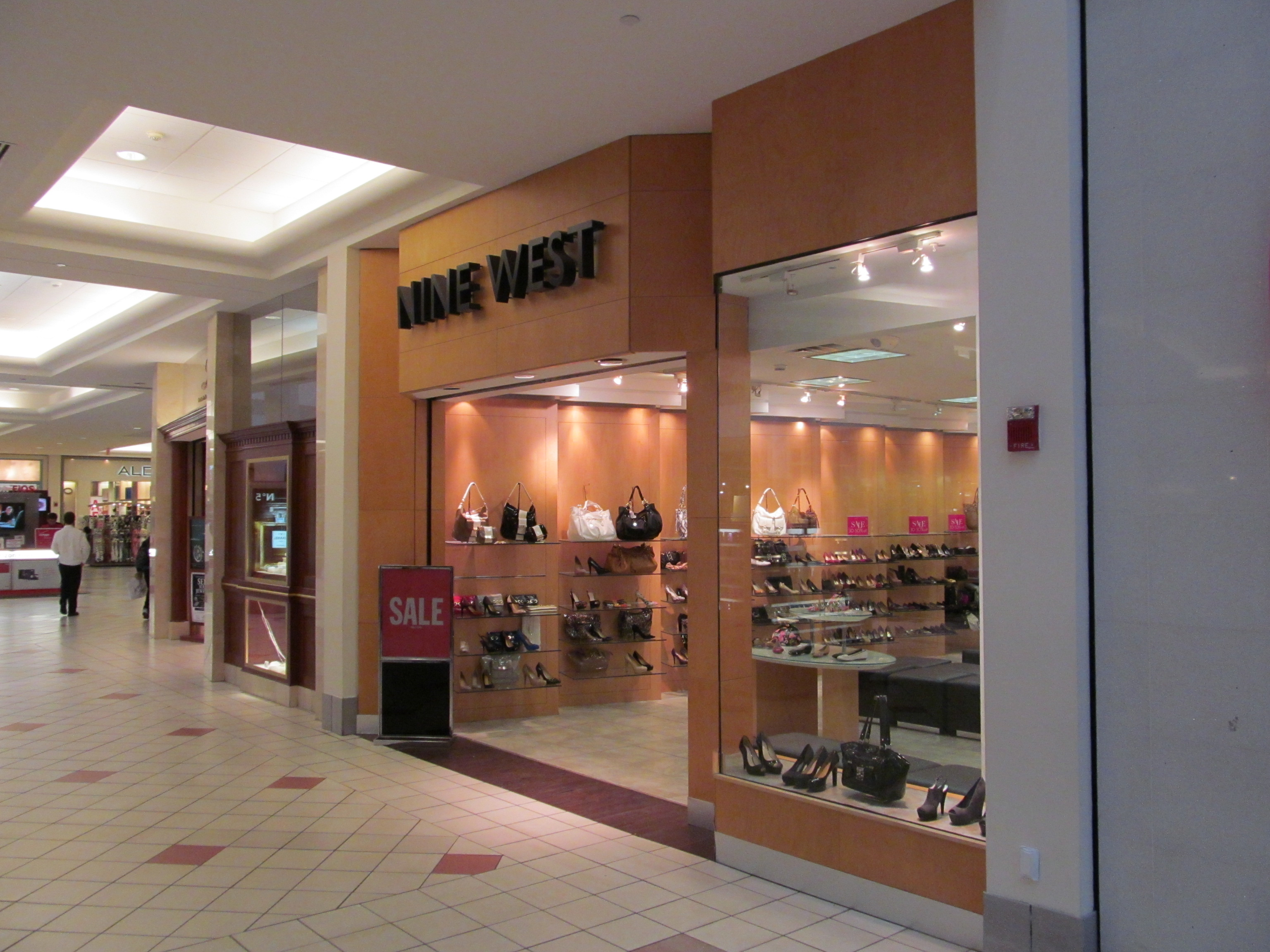
A Nine West concept store located in Braintree, Massachusetts.

In 1977, Camuto and Fisher broke free to form their own company, Fisher Camuto, forerunner of Nine West Group. The company's name was taken from a number the pair spied on a neighboring building from their office on Manhattan's 57th Street.

The company combined fashionable designs with popular prices, making use of Brazilian factories for the bulk of its production. The company was a pioneer in the wholesaling of quality footwear in "case packs" of predesignated sizes. This enabled Fisher Camuto to achieve great efficiencies in warehousing and to match supply with demand, thereby limiting losses through overproduction. Nine West also effectively grew in size and public consciousness through its establishment of a network of company "concept stores" in urban centers across the United States. After serving as creative director of Nine West, in 1993 Fisher was appointed CEO as the company was taken public. In 1999, Nine West was sold to Jones Apparel Group for $900 million.

=== Camuto Group ===
In August 2001, together with his wife Louise Camuto, Vince Camuto established Camuto Group, which provides design, sourcing, marketing and production services to retailers. The following year, he launched four footwear brands for Dillard's Department Stores, including Antonio Melani, Gianni Bini, Nurture, and Michelle D. Later that year, he acquired the footwear licenses for BCBG, Max Azria and BCBGirls.

In 2005, he launched his namesake footwear line, Vince Camuto (not to be confused with clothing brand Vince). Closely thereafter in 2006, he partnered with Tory Burch to launch her footwear collection and collaborated with her to create the Reva ballet flat. In 2009, the company added Lucky Brand Jeans footwear and kensiegirl footwear to its portfolio and later launched a handbag collection.

In 2005, Camuto purchased the master license for Jessica Simpson. Two years later, he opened the first Jessica Simpson Collection shop-in-shop at Macy's Herald Square, New York. Additional shops have opened in other cities. As of February 2014, the brand is worth $1 billion.

=== Death and legacy ===
Camuto died on January 21, 2015 due to prostate cancer. He passed peacefully at his home in Greenwich, Connecticut surrounded by family. He was 78 years old at the time of his death.

Camuto supported charities including Ronald McDonald House, St. Jude's Hospital, Leukemia Society of America and The Domestic Abuse Awareness Foundation. In addition, he served on the board of Wish-And-A-Smile, an organization dedicated to supporting numerous children's charities.

Camuto's companies were the recipient of several major industry awards, with Fisher Camuto named Company of the Year by Footwear News in 1991. Nine West's retail operation was named Retailer of the Year by the same publication in 1994. In 2001 Camuto was named to the Footwear News Hall of Fame.

Alex Dillard, president of Dilliard's Inc. eulogized his friend as "an icon" of the fashion industry whose "passion for the footwear business and ... vision for style meeting function were unmatched."

== Works ==
- Life of Style. New York: Assouline, 2014.
