= Seward Park Campus =

School in Manhattan, New York

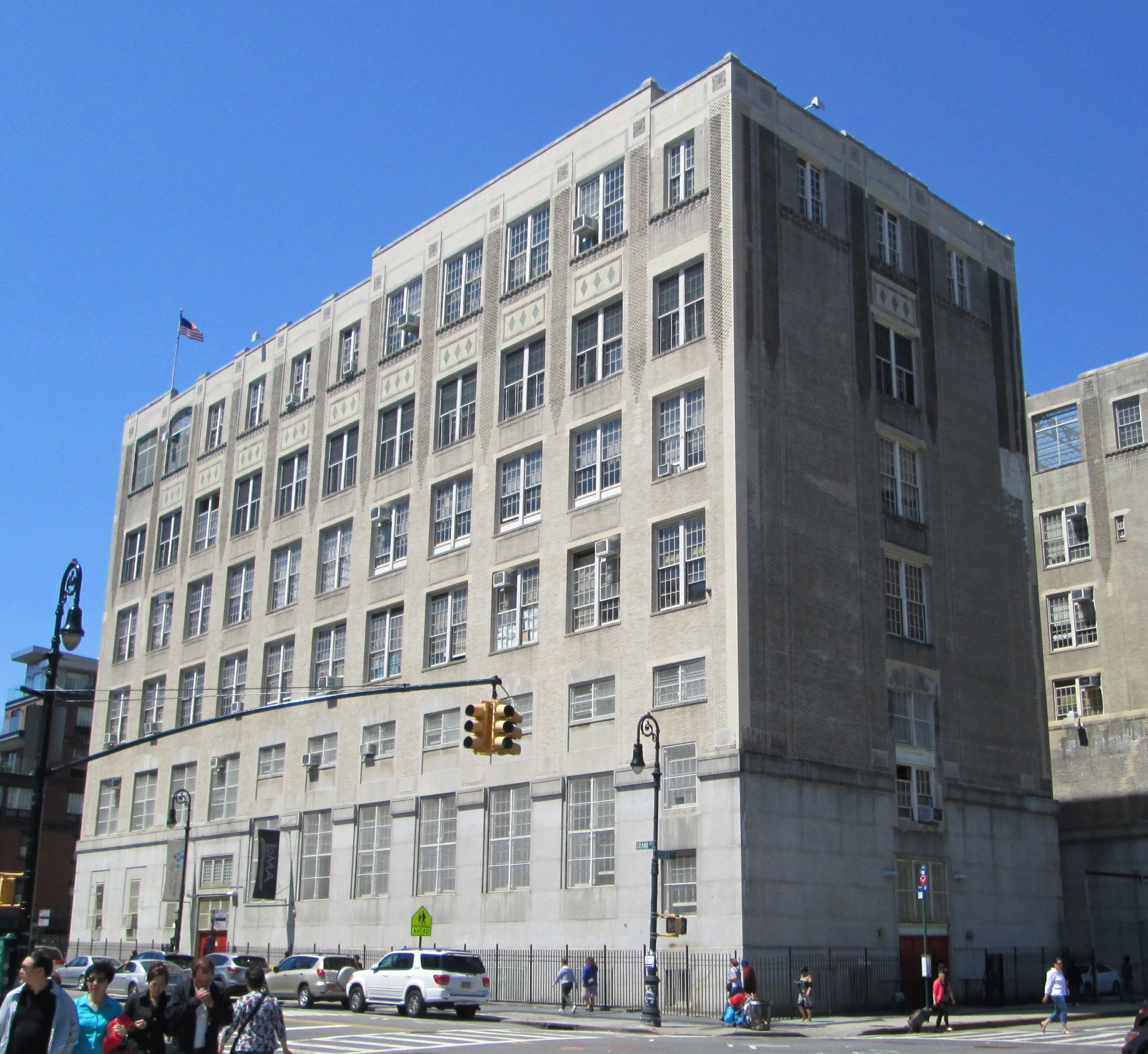
- Seward Park Campus (2013)

Location
- 350 Grand Street; New York City, New York 10002; United States

Information
- Grades: 9-12
- Language: English
- Colors: Blue, Grey, and White
- Mascot: Bears
- Team name: Bears, Lady Bears
- Website: http://www.sewardparkhs.com/

The Seward Park Campus is a "vertical campus" of the New York City Department of Education located at 350 Grand Street at the corner of Essex Street, on the Lower East Side of Manhattan, New York City. It was the location of the former Seward Park High School, a now-closed comprehensive high school.

The school began as P.S. 62 Intermediate, an intermediate school. In 1923 the school pursued an experimental path as a combined junior-senior high school. Two years later, it transformed to a strictly senior high school, with Robert Brodie serving as its first high school principal. Owing to the construction of the New York City Subway's IND Sixth Avenue Line (F and <F> trains), the school was relocated to the site of a courthouse and the Ludlow Street Jail. The new building was completed in 1929.

The school experienced a decline in performance and graduated its last class in June 2006. The building now houses five small schools: the High School for Dual Language and Asian Studies, New Design High School, the Essex Street Academy — formerly the High School for History and Communication, the Lower Manhattan Arts Academy, and the Urban Assembly Academy of Government and Law. The small schools showed graduation rates which were much improved over that of the old comprehensive school. Seward Park High School's graduation rate in 2001 was 32%, while the graduation rates of the smaller schools in 2012 were:

- High School for Dual Language and Asian Studies – 92.5%
- Lower Manhattan Arts Academy – 80%
- Urban Assembly Academy of Government and Law – 79.3%
- New Design High School – 79.1%
- Essex Street Academy – 76.5%

The campus offers programs on Saturdays where students can come in and participate in activities such as SAT prep, cooking, and Open Gym. The school refers to this program as the "Super Saturday Program".

The campuses' varsity sports teams are nicknamed the Seward Park Bears. They participate in the PSAL Division A Athletics. Boys' sports include baseball, basketball, volleyball, handball, bowling, and badminton. Girls' sports include basketball, softball, volleyball, tennis, bowling, and badminton. Each individual school in the campus has a junior varsity basketball team which is very competitive.

== Notable alumni ==
- Edwin Almonte, former pitcher for the New York Mets
- Julius Axelrod, Nobel Prize winner
- Anna Berger, actress
- Lou Bernstein, photographer (did not graduate)
- Kevin S. Bright, producer and director
- Sammy Cahn, entertainer
- Vince Camuto, founder of Nine West
- Tony Curtis, actor
- Roberto Durán, former pitcher for the Detroit Tigers
- Mickey Freeman, actor
- Bonnie Garcia, politician and the first Hispanic woman to represent the 80th assembly district of California
- Estelle Getty, entertainer
- David Gordon, postmodern dancer, choreographer and director
- Luis Guzmán, actor
- Jane Katz, Olympic long distance swimmer
- Ken McFadden, basketball player, led Cleveland St. to a Cinderella run to the Elite 8 in 1986; "The Mouse"
- Johnny Marines, manager of the former group Aventura and current manager of Bachata star Romeo Santos
- Walter Matthau, actor
- Zero Mostel, actor
- Selwyn Raab, journalist, author, and former investigative reporter for The New York Times.
- Ethel Rosenberg, wife of Julius Rosenberg
- Julius Rosenberg, executed Soviet spy
- Joe E. Ross, comic television actor (did not graduate)
- Thomas Satch Sanders, basketball Hall of Famer
- Samuel A. Spiegel, lawyer, politician, and judge
- Jerry Stiller, actor, comedian
- Aida Turturro, actress
- Stu Ungar, poker player (did not graduate)
- Keenen Ivory Wayans, actor, comedian
