= Kurt Geiger =

British footwear and accessories retailer

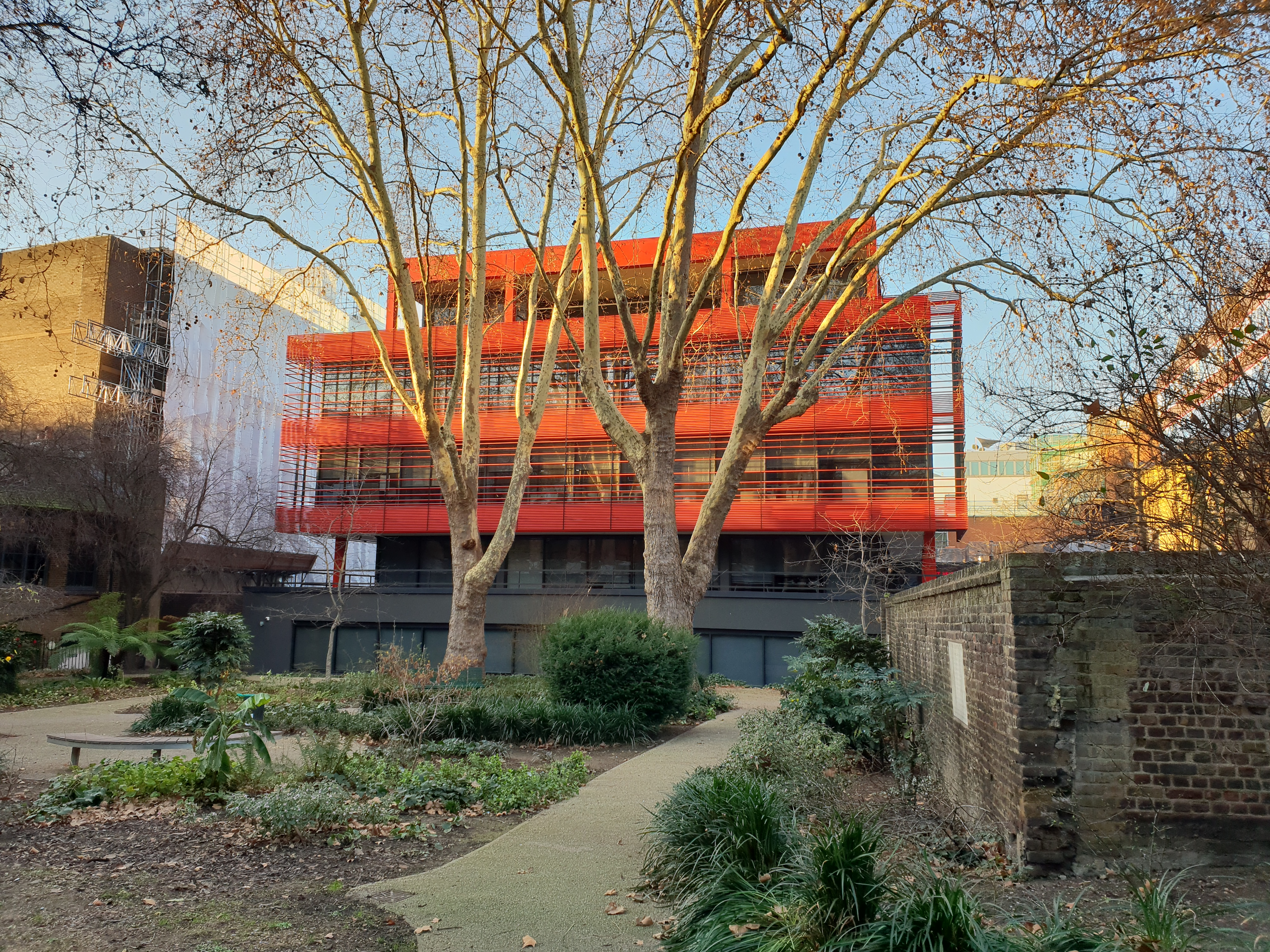
- The Kurt Geiger headquarters building in Clerkenwell
- Type: Private
- Industry: Footwear and Accessories Retailing
- Founded: 1963; 63 years ago
- Founder: Kurt Geiger
- Headquarters: London, England, UK
- Number of locations: 70+
- Area served: Worldwide
- Key people: Neil Clifford (CEO), Rebecca Farrar-Hockley (Creative Director)
- Products: Kurt Geiger London, KG Kurt Geiger, Carvela and Mini Miss KG
- Revenue: £260 million (2014)
- Owner: Steve Madden Ltd.
- Number of employees: 1700
- Website: www.kurtgeiger.com

Kurt Geiger is a luxury British footwear and accessories brand. Kurt Geiger has around 70 stores, and multiple concessions within department stores, including Harrods and Selfridges.The company was acquired by US based company Steve Madden Ltd for £289 million in 2025.

The brand began in the UK as a New Bond Street shoe shop in 1964 founded by Austrian-born immigrant Kurt Geiger. Today the company's brands include: Kurt Geiger London, KG Kurt Geiger and Carvela, created by its in-house team.

The Kurt Geiger headquarters is located on Britton Street, Clerkenwell, London. The building, originally dating from the 1970s, was remodelled in 2009 by Archer Architects and is finished in a distinctive red, described as Pompean Red.

Neil Clifford has held the position of Chief Executive Officer at Kurt Geiger since 2003. Prior to that (from 1995) Clifford held many positions at Kurt Geiger, including Managing Director. He has expanded the business beyond the United Kingdom, entered new international partnerships and successfully launched an online business.

== History ==
The company is named after its Austrian-born founder Kurt Geiger (1915 - 1972), who came to London from Australia in 1963, he opened the first store in New Bond Street the following year. The brand was purchased from the founder's widow in 1972 by the South African Spitz family, who owned Bruno Magli another fashionable London footwear brand.

In 1978 the merged with shoe brand Carvela, a brand founded by David Spitz. Kurt Geiger Holdings Ltd (which traded as Kurt Geiger, Bruno Magli and Carvela) was acquired by House of Fraser, which was then owned by Mohamed Al-Fayed, in 1985. Al-Fayed sold the brand in 2005 for £46 million to a management buy-out.

After a management buyout in 2008, it was sold by Graphite Capital to the U.S.-based brand management company The Jones Group in 2011. In 2014, the Jones Group was acquired by Sycamore Partners, who spun off Kurt Geiger into its own company.

In December 2015, London-based private equity firm Cinven acquired Kurt Geiger from Sycamore for £245 million. In February 2025, US based fashion company Steve Madden, Ltd acquired Kurt Geiger from CINVEN for £289 million.

In October 2023, Kurt Geiger opened two stores in Mexico City, one in the business district of Santa Fe and another in the shopping mall Perisur.
