= United States Shoe Corporation =

American retailer

The United States Shoe Corporation (also known as U.S. Shoe) was a retailing conglomerate headquartered in Cincinnati, Ohio, that operated several retail chains and brands mostly in the fields of shoes, clothing and optical. Most notably, U.S. Shoe was the parent company of optical retailer LensCrafters from 1984 until its own acquisition by Luxottica in 1995.

== History ==
U.S. Shoe's history dates back to 1879 with the establishment of the Stern-Auer Shoe Company in Cincinnati. In 1921, eight other Cincinnati shoe manufacturers consolidated to form the United States Shoe Corporation—which had Red Cross Shoes as its flagship brand—but by 1929 the combine was failing, and Joseph Stern, head of Stern-Auer, proposed to merge the two companies with the provision that Stern take over marketing for Red Cross Shoes. After two years of negotiations, the new United States Shoe Corp. was created with Stern as its president. The company survived the Great Depression by cutting the price of the Red Cross shoe from $10 to $6. At the onset of World War II, the American Red Cross objected to the commercial use of the Red Cross name, and U.S. Shoe voluntarily suspended use of the name; in 1948, the Federal Trade Commission allowed U.S. Shoe to resume using the name on the condition that the company publicly disclaim any association with the American Red Cross.

In 1955, U.S. Shoe bought women's shoe maker Joyce Inc., and in 1957 obtained the rights to the Selby brand. The company also introduced other brands, such as Cobbies and Socialites. In 1961 the company entered the children's shoe market with the purchase of Vaisey-Bristol Shoe Co., maker of the Jumping Jacks brand. U.S. Shoe entered the shoe retailing business in the 1960s, acquiring Wm. Hahn & Co. in 1963 and Cutter-Karcher Shoe Company in 1964. It expanded into the apparel business by purchasing women's clothing retailer Casual Corner in 1969 and creating men's clothing retailer J. Riggings in 1970. It acquired discount women's apparel retailer T.H. Mandy in 1981. In 1984, U.S. Shoe purchased optical retailer LensCrafters, which had just three locations at the time; by 1989, there were 350 locations, and LensCrafters was generating 40 percent of U.S. Shoe's operating income.

The apparel division added chains such as Career Image, Petite Sophisticate, and August Max Woman, while J. Riggings was sold to Edison Brothers Stores in 1987, and teen clothing chain Ups 'N' Downs and women's clothing chain Caren Charles were sold in 1993. T.H. Mandy was shut down in 1991. Its core shoe brands began to wane, though newer brand Easy Spirit proved popular.

In 1995, Luxottica launched a hostile takeover attempt of U.S. Shoe, with the goal of acquiring LensCrafters. In March 1995, U.S. Shoe agreed to sell its shoe division to the Nine West Group, elevating U.S. Shoe president Noel Hord to the position of CEO of the combined enterprise. In April 1995, Luxottica announced it had reached an agreement to purchase U.S. Shoe for $1.4 billion. In October 1995, Luxottica spun off U.S. Shoe's apparel division, which by this time was known as the Women's Specialty Retailing Group and included Casual Corner, to a company operated by Luxottica founder Leonardo Del Vecchio and his family.
