= Noel Hord =

American businessman

- Born: July 10, 1946; Terre Haute, Indiana, U.S.
- Died: May 26, 2026 (aged 79); Hacienda Heights, California
- Education: Indiana State University
- Occupation: Women's shoe executive
- Years active: 1967-1998
- Known for: President, Nine West

Noel Hord was a black American businessman best known for serving as the president of United States Shoe Corporation and later, Nine West.

== Early life and career ==
Hord was born in Terre Haute, Indiana to Noel Ernest Hord, a carpenter and Baptist minister, and Jessie May (Tyler) Hord, a homemaker who later received a college degree while in her 40s and became a librarian. Hord attended a recently desegregated high school in Terre Haute and enjoyed making friends of all races. In 1967, Hord was hired as a shoe salesman for Ben Becker Shoes in Terre Haute, considered at the time to be a groundbreaking position for a young black man. Over the next two decades, Hord worked in a number of position of increased responsibility to include supervising show sales at J.L. Hudson's department stores.

In 1984, Hord joined Nine West, then known as the Fisher Camuto Group, as a divisional president. In 1993 he left Nine West and became the president and chief executive of U.S. Shoe which would merge with Nine West in 1995 and elevate Hord as the president and chief executive of the combined enterprise. In 1997, as Nine West's earning and market share fell, Hord resigned from his position.

After several years in various managerial and consulting roles, in 2001 he joined BCBG Max Azria as president and chief operating officer, where he started a new shoe brand "BCBG Girls". Following his stint at BCBG, Hord worked for several shoe and footwear firms, to include international retailer Li & Fung where he was president of the company's KVZ Footwear Group. From 2010 to 2016 he was the president and CEO of Donald J. Pliner where he was responsible for revitalizing the company's unprofitable shoe business.

== Personal life and legacy ==
In 1966 Hord met Cora Ritchie while attending services at his father's church and they later married. Cora died in 1994 and Hord married his second wife, Tamar Hord.

Noel Hord died on May 26, 2026, in Hacienda Heights, California, at the age of 79 from Parkinson's disease. At the time of his death, his survivors included his wife Tamar, a daughter, a son, a brother, two sisters and three grandchildren.

In his later years, he told an interviewer, "Even though I was a person of color, at a time segregation was going on, I never put barriers or lines around what I wanted to do. I knew in terms of performance, I had to stand out."

In 1993 Hord co-founded The Hord Foundation with his then-wife, Cora. The foundation, based in Danbury, Connecticut, provided scholarships for minority and disadvantaged youth. After his death, his wife Tamara claimed that her husband considered the Hord Foundation to be the "greatest achievement of his life."

“Noel was a wonderful person and a true professional. I had the privilege of working with him at Nine West many years ago, and I always admired his work ethic, his deep knowledge of the business, and the way he carried himself. He was thoughtful, dedicated, and highly respected by everyone who had the opportunity to work with him. My condolences go out to his family, friends, and all who knew him.” -- Marc Fisher, founder and CEO of Marc Fisher Footwear
