= EMP Merchandising =

German company

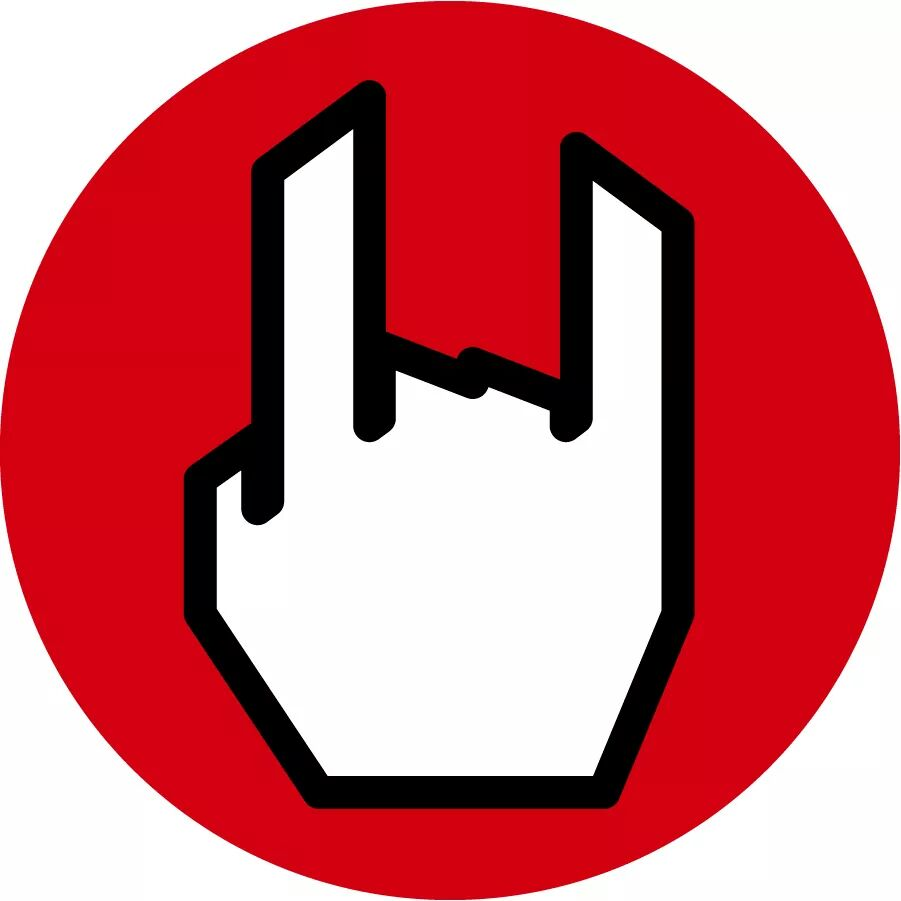
- Type: Private
- Industry: Retail merchandising
- Founded: 1986
- Headquarters: Lingen, Germany
- Key people: Jan Marc Fischer
- Products: Music, video games, DVDs, accessories
- Revenue: €200 million (2017)
- Owner: Warner Music Group
- Number of employees: More than 700 (2021)
- Website: www.emp.de

EMP Merchandising, also known as Large Popmerchandising (in the Netherlands and Belgium), is a German-based music mail order and merchandising store. The abbreviation EMP stands for Exclusive Merchandise Products. The company distributes a quarterly catalog to customers. In a 2003 report, the Osnabrück Chamber of Commerce considered the company to be the largest mail order business for hard rock and heavy metal music in Germany. In September 2018, Warner Music Group acquired EMP from Sycamore Partners.

== History ==
EMP was founded in 1986 by Felix Lethmate. The business started in an apartment in Lingen in Emsland and developed in a short time into a company that employed more than 500 people across Europe in December 2016.

Distributed are sound carriers and merchandising items (fan shirts, banners, etc.) of metal and rock bands, music videos and recordings of live performances, movies of all genres, gaming, fun slogan shirts and other clothing items and accessories. A separate category for hip hop recordings was discontinued after the hip-hop mail order company MZEE.com was taken over, which was temporarily a subsidiary of EMP Merchandising HGmbH. Today, the company distributes its merchandise throughout Europe.

== PLH Merchandise ==
On 31 January 2014, a store opened in Vienna, other stores are located in Wietmarschen (EMP Outlet Store A31), Essen, Leipzig, Nuremberg, Dortmund and Lingen.

In July 2015, the company, previously owned by its founders, was sold to the U.S.-based private equity company Sycamore Partners, also the owner of Belk Inc., among others. In September 2018, Warner Music Group acquired the company at a company valuation of 155 million euros.

== EMP magazine ==
Since 1998, the company produces a magazine that is mailed quarterly to customers, and is also available in newsagents. This magazine, which serves primarily as a mail order catalog, includes CD reviews of new releases and interviews with relevant bands. The magazine's circulation is around 1 million copies. A separate magazine was published for MZEE until 2012.

== Awards ==
- 2007 ECHO in the category trade partner of the year
- 2015 NEO Award 2015
- 2020 Social Media Award STORYCLASH

Kelly Osbourne
