= Houwald family =

German noble family

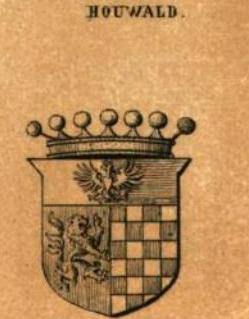
Coat of arms of the Houwald family

The Houwald family (also Houvalt, Ubald, Haubal, Haubalt, Huwald) is a German noble family originating from Saxony.

== Notable members ==
- Christoph von Houwald (1601–1661), mercenary soldier from Saxony with a prominent career
- Christoph Ernst von Houwald (1778–1845), German dramatist and author
- Heinrich von Houwald (1807–1884), Prussian count and statesman
- Ernst von Houwald (politician) (1844–1903)
- Karl von Houwald (1816–1883), German civil servant
- Werner von Houwald (1901–1974), German painter
- Götz von Houwald (1913–2001), German diplomat, historian and ethnographer
- Houvalt family were the owners of the town of Maišiagala, Lithuania

== See also ==
- Howald (surname)
- Ubald
- Ubaldo
