= Louise Camuto =

Swedish model and businesswoman

Louise Camuto-Grieder
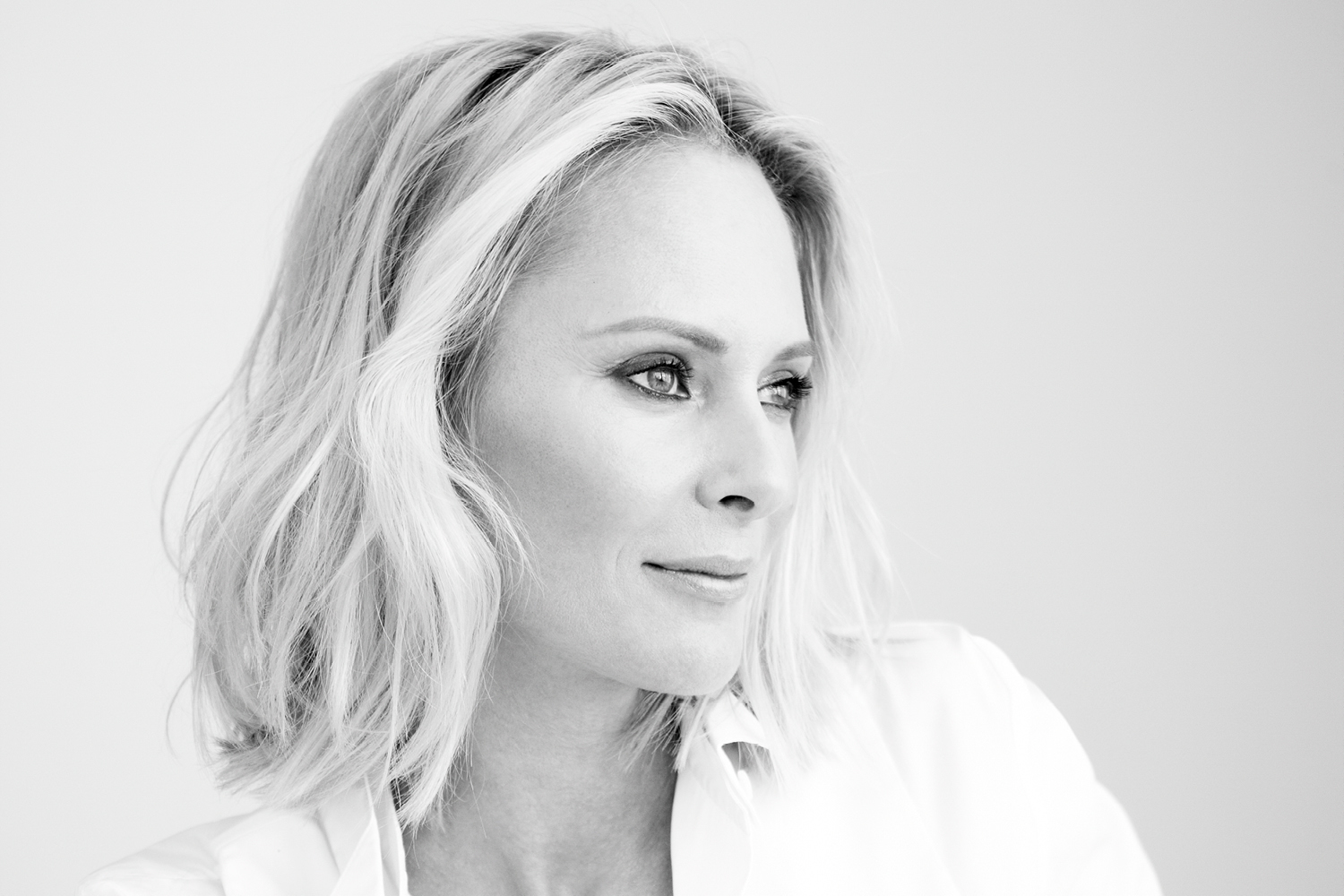
- Born: Louise Drevenstam
- Occupation: Entrepreneur
- Title: Miss Sweden 1989
- Spouse(s): Vince Camuto (married 1999–2015); Daniel Grieder (married 2022–present)

Louise Camuto-Grieder (born as Louise Drevenstam) is a Swedish model, entrepreneur, interior designer and brand advisor.

== Career ==
Camuto-Grieder was Miss Sweden 1989, and finished as first runner-up in the Miss Universe 1989 pageant. Later that year, she was crowned Miss Scandinavia in Helsinki.

In 2001, together with her late husband, businessman Vince Camuto, Camuto-Grieder established the Greenwich based company Camuto Group. Camuto-Grieder was Creative Director and President of Marketing at Camuto Group, where she crafted and designed brands with Vince Camuto. After his death in 2015, she took over the role of Chief creative officer. She also worked as the creative director for the brand Louise et Cie.

Camuto-Grieder has since been working as an interior designer, brand advisor, entrepreneur, and designer.

In 2015, Camuto-Grieder was appointed board member of Two Ten Footwear Foundation. In 2016, Camuto-Grieder was honored as an "outstanding mother" alongside Sarah Jessica Parker and others by the National Mother’s Day Committee. One month later, she was also honored for her philanthropy at the 10th Annual Women of Inspiration luncheon in New York. Camuto-Grieder is also active in several other charitable initiatives, e.g., FFANY Shoes On Sale by QVC, which supports breast cancer research and awareness.

== Personal life ==
Camuto-Grieder was married to the late Vince Camuto from 1999 until his death in 2015, and together they had a son, Philip Camuto. Camuto-Grieder also had two step-children with her late husband.

In 2019, Camuto-Grieder’s engagement to Hugo Boss CEO Daniel Grieder was announced. The couple married in 2022. Her main places of residence are in the US and Switzerland.
