= Daniel Grieder =

Swiss Entrepreneur and CEO of Hugo Boss

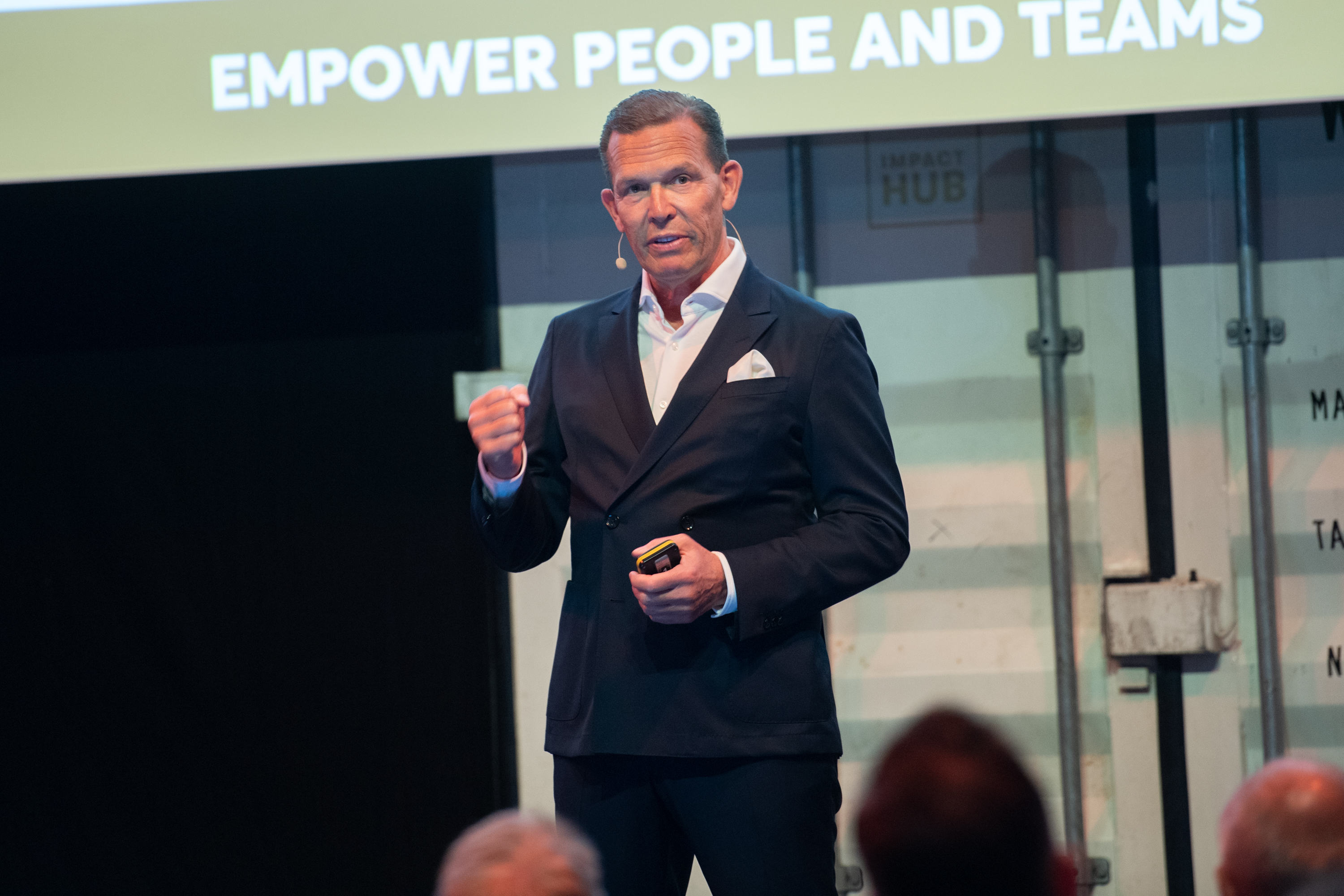
- Born: Daniel Heinrich Grieder; November 6, 1961 (age 65); Schaffhausen, Switzerland
- Education: HWV Zürich (Zurich University of Applied Sciences in Business Administration)
- Occupation: Business executive
- Known for: CEO of Tommy Hilfiger Global (2014–2020); CEO of PVH Europe and Calvin Klein Europe (2014–2020); CEO of Hugo Boss (2021–2026)
- Title: Former CEO
- Term: Present
- Board member of: Rieter (since 2022)
- Spouse: Louise Camuto
- Children: 2
- Awards: CMO of the Year (2024)

Daniel Heinrich Grieder (born 6 November 1961) is a Swiss entrepreneur and business executive. Between 2014 and 2020, he was CEO of Tommy Hilfiger Global, as well as CEO of PVH (Phillips Van Heusen Group) Europe and Calvin Klein Europe. In 2021 he became the CEO of Hugo Boss and eventually stepped down in 2026.

== Personal life ==
Grieder grew up in Schaffhausen, Switzerland. He completed his vocational education at Globus, and later attended the business school HWV Zurich (Zurich University of Applied Sciences in Business Administration). During this time Grieder founded the trading company Max Trade, which produced, imported and sold leather garments in Switzerland.

Grieder is married to Louise Camuto, and has two sons from his former marriage. He lives in Brissago, Metzingen and New York City.

== Professional career ==
From 1994, under the company name Madison Clothing, he took over the distribution of international brands, such as Pepe Jeans, Stone Island and C.P. Company. In 1997, the company got the tender to become the sales agency for Tommy Hilfiger in Grieder's native Switzerland, Austria and Eastern Europe, responsible to establish the brand there. Later in 2004, he joined Tommy Hilfiger as Vice President of Commercial Operations on the Board of Tommy Hilfiger Europe. In 2005, Grieder was involved in Hilfiger's change of ownership. As a result, the company moved its headquarters from New York to Amsterdam. In 2008, Grieder became CEO of Tommy Hilfiger Europe. Later in 2014, he was appointed as CEO of Tommy Hilfiger Global and at the same time CEO for Calvin Klein Europe and PVH Europe. Grieder stepped down of those positions in June 2020. During his tenure the company digitised its offers and on his initiative was one of the first to introduce "see now, buy now" at fashion shows, where both retailers and customers who followed the catwalk could order clothes while the show was still on.

In mid-June 2020, the German fashion company Hugo Boss announced that Grieder would become their CEO. Grieder took up his new position in June 2021, after serving a post-contractual competition prohibition. Since then, the company achieved an operating profit in 2022 that was higher than expected by forecasts and also represented the company's highest result to date. As a result, Grieder increased the sales target for 2025. In 2023, Hugo Boss generated a revenue of €4.20 billion. In 2024 Grieder's contract was extended until December 2028. As Stephan Knieps wrote in his Wirtschaftswoche commentary, the contract extension is attributed, among other factors, to the results of the new marketing strategy. In addition, Grieder's business strategy also included the introduction of brands for a broader and younger audience.

Since April 2022 Grieder has been a member of the board of directors at Rieter.

In 2024, Grieder was named "CMO of the Year" by the Serviceplan Group and its partners, based on his efforts to rejuvenate the Hugo Boss brand identity.

Hugo Boss announced in November 2026 that Grieder would leave the CEO position at the end of the year.

== Publications ==
- Gen Z für Entscheider:innen, co-authored. Yael Meier et al. (ed.), Frankfurt am Main: Campus Verlag. 2022. ISBN 978-3593452418.
