= Maišiagala =

- Town
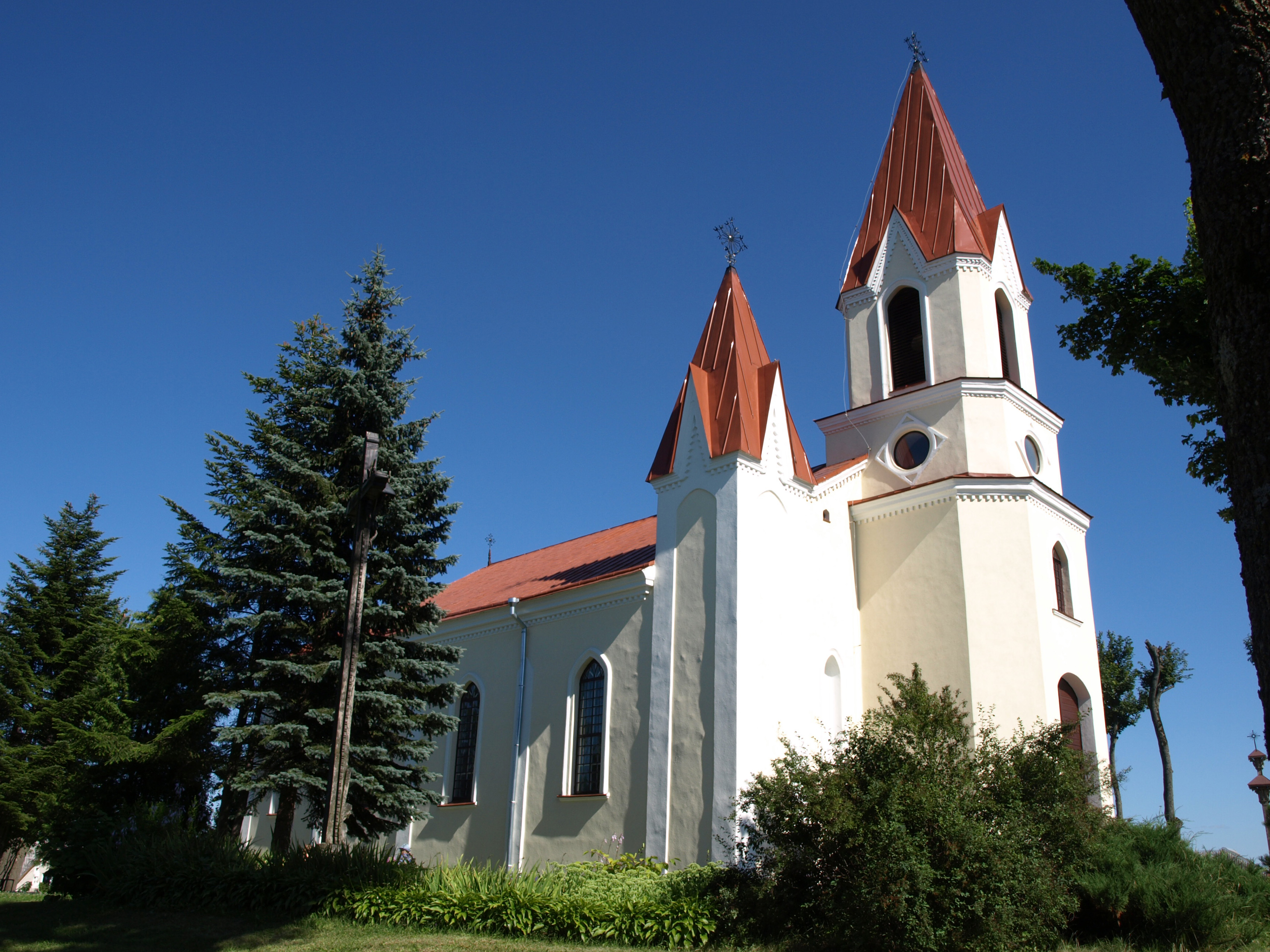

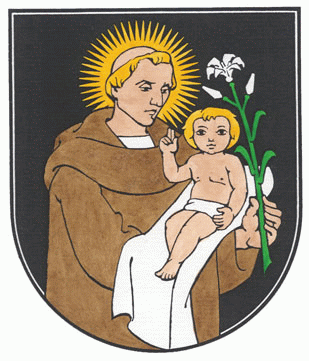
- Coat of arms

- Location of Maišiagala
- Coordinates: 54°52′20″N 25°04′00″E
- Country: Lithuania
- County: Vilnius County
- Municipality: Vilnius district municipality
- Eldership: Maišiagala eldership
- Capital of: Maišiagala Eldership
- First mentioned: 1254

Population (2021)
  - Total: 1,562
- Time zone: UTC+2 (EET)
  - Summer (DST): UTC+3 (EEST)

Maišiagala (Polish: Mejszagoła) is a historic town in Vilnius district municipality, Lithuania. It is located about 17 km (11 mi) northwest of Vilnius city municipality near the Vilnius–Panevėžys highway. According to the 2021 census, it had a population of 1 562, a decrease from 1,636, registered at the 2011 census.

== History ==
Maišiagala, first mentioned in 1254, is one of the earliest Lithuanian settlements. It had a large defensive castle, which was part of the defensive network around Vilnius against the Teutonic Order's knights. The wooden castle was destroyed in 1365, but was rebuilt. According to Jan Długosz, Grand Duke of Lithuania Algirdas died in this castle in 1377. After the Christianization of Lithuania in 1387, Maišiagala was one of the seven towns in Lithuania where a Catholic church was built. In 1390, during the Lithuanian Civil War of 1389–1392, the castle was burned down and was not rebuilt.

The town continued to exist, growing as a trading center, and was granted city privileges sometime in mid-16th century. Its coat of arms depicted Saint Anthony of Padua. At the time it was a royal city and Grand Duke of Lithuania Sigismund I the Old built a castle for his Italian wife Bona Sforza. Therefore, the old hill fort is sometimes known as Bona's Hill. Sigismund also reconstructed the town church. After extinction of the Jagiellon dynasty, Maišiagala lost its status as royal summer residence and began to decline. It became property of various nobles: first Sapieha, then Tyzenhauz family. In 1805 the Houwald family bought the town from heirs of Ignacy Massalski, Bishop of Vilnius. They built a manor, which now houses a school, in the Classical style.

After World War I, the town was a target of clashes in the Polish–Lithuanian War. After Żeligowski's Mutiny in 1920, it became part of the Republic of Central Lithuania (1920–1922), which merged into the Second Polish Republic in 1922. After the Soviet–Lithuanian Mutual Assistance Treaty of 1939, Maišiagala was returned to Lithuania.

== History of the Jews of Maišiagala ==
Between World War I and World War II the Jewish population was estimated to be around 700 people, approximately a third of the total population of the town at the time. At the end of 1939 with the transfer of Vilnius to a local governance, the first Pogrom on the Jewish population happened, just as Vilnius was transferred to the local governance. A second Pogrom happened after the Soviets evacuated the area at the beginning of Operation Barbarossa. As the area was conquered by the Germans, The local Jewish population was forced into hard labor, and at the end of July 1941 they were all concentrated in the local Ghetto at the poorest part of the town, and were forced to pay heavy taxes. At the end of September 1941, at a small town next to Maišiagala called Vilnova, the rest of the Jewish population was murdered by the German and Local police.

Among its natives was the great Jewish philosopher Rabbi David ("the Nazirite") Cohen.

== Demography ==
According to the census of 2021, there were 1,562 inhabitants in Maišiagala and 2,822 in the whole Maišiagala Eldership. The ethnographic composition of the eldership was the following: 1094 or 38,8% Lithuanians, 1296 or 45,9% Poles, 286 or 10,1% Russians, 45 or 1,6% Belarusians, 15 or 0,5% Ukrainians and 82 or 2,9% other peoples.
