= Johnny Marines =

American music executive (born 1990)

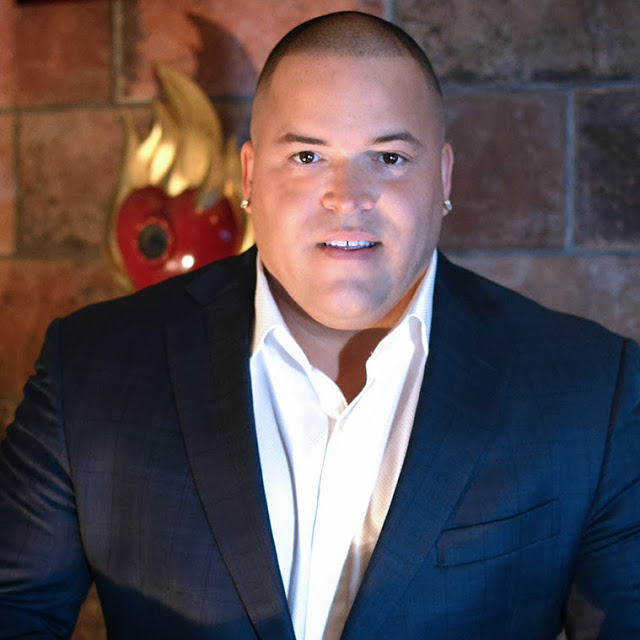
- Marines in 2014
- Born: New York City, U.S.
- Occupation: Music executive
- Years active: 1993–present
- Police Career
- Department: New York City Police Department
- Service years: 1993–2009
- Rank: Sergeant
- Website: http://www.romeosantosonline.com

Johnny Marines is an American music executive from New York City.

== Biography ==
Johnny Marines is of Dominican descent and grew up on the Lower East Side of Manhattan. He attended Seward Park Campus and John Jay College School of Criminal Justice. He worked as a police officer in the New York City Police Department from 1993 to 2009, retiring at the rank of sergeant.

Johnny Marines first met Romeo Santos, lead singer/songwriter and co-producer of Aventura, in 2002 and initially performed security functions for the group. In 2003 Johnny became the group's manager. Under Marines' management, Aventura earned a Latin Grammy Award (2007), several Premio Lo Nuestro awards, Latin Billboard Music Awards, Premio Juventud awards, and an MTV Video Music Award for Latin Artist of the Year.

Romeo Santos began his solo career in 2011 with Marines as manager. Santos released the album Formula, Vol. 1 that year. The album went multi-platinum, had five hit singles, and won several awards. Santos released his second album, Formula, Vol. 2 in 2014, which was similarly acclaimed. Santos conducted multiple tours throughout this period and played venues including Madison Square Garden and Yankee Stadium. In 2017, Santos' third solo album, Golden was released.

From June 2016 until July 2017, Johnny was the President of Roc Nation Latin, a newly formed division within the company.

In conjunction with Aventura and Romeo Santos, Marines co-funded toy drives in New York and the Dominican Republic and donated turkeys to low-income families during the holidays.

== Awards and recognition ==
Marines was invited to be a guest speaker at Harvard's youth event the Latino Leadership Initiative, in 2011, 2012, and 2013. He has also spoken at Columbia University, Lehman College, and Syracuse University. In 2012, Marines was interviewed to be a part of the "Famosos" section of About.com's celebrity section.

In August 2015, he was named a "Latin Power Player" by Billboard in August 2015, 2016, and 2018 for managing Romeo Santos and his role as President at Roc Nation
