= L.E.I. =

American clothing company

l.e.i. (an acronym that stands for Life Energy Intelligence; the logo is usually uncapitalized, but the newer logo is stylized as L.e.i.) is an American clothing company, mainly targeted at teenage girls and young women. Launched in 1989, l.e.i. is owned by Jones Apparel Group and is headquartered in Los Angeles, California. The brand is sold in many retail stores, however they do not have stores of their own. l.e.i. products are available at Wal-Mart, as well as many online stores.

The brand's current parent company Nine West Holdings filed for bankruptcy in 2018.

== Products ==
l.e.i. sells different types of clothes that are aimed at preteen/teenage girls, such as shirts, pants, skirts, and swimwear. They are most popular for selling jeans. In addition, l.e.i. has an extensive lineup of shoes and accessories, including jewelry, sunglasses, handbags, and lingerie.

l.e.i. designs clothing that is unique and fashionable for teen girls, proclaiming that they will have style, with a "hint of attitude".

== Marketing ==
Country singer Taylor Swift promoted l.e.i. jeans for Wal-Mart from 2007 to 2009.
