= Ugly Stik =

Fishing equipment retail company of Shakespeare

Ugly Stik is a subsidiary company of Shakespeare, a fishing equipment retail company. Ugly Stik is primarily known for its fishing rods. Shakespeare, originally called William Shakespeare Jr. Company, was founded by William Shakespeare Jr. in 1897 in Kalamazoo, Michigan. The William Shakespeare Jr. Company changed its name to Shakespeare in 1915, then moved its base of operations to Columbia, South Carolina in 1970. In 1976, Shakespeare introduced the Ugly Stik rod.

== Ugly Stik rod ==
The Ugly Stik rod gained popularity due to its distinctive construction method. Shakespeare employed the Howald process, initially introduced with the "Wonderod" in 1947, a technique invented by Dr. Arthur M. Howald. This process transformed the way Shakespeare's rods were produced and was later used to craft the first Ugly Stik rods. The approach involved incorporating an internal spiral fiberglass core and parallel glass fibers infused with pigmented polyester resin, which were then layered with tape and cured in an oven. Subsequently, high-pressure water jets removed the tape. Although contemporary Ugly Stik rods still use the Howald process, they have undergone material and technique adjustments to accommodate technological advancements since 1976. The modern Ugly Stik rods, due to the Howald Process, exhibit both strength and flexibility, enabling them to be bent into a circle without breaking. Graphite within the fiberglass wraps increases the sensitivity further.

Ugly Stik got its name from the "ugly" appearance of its first rods. The first Ugly Stik rods were very large, featured metal handles, the graphite color showed through the blank, and the wraps were black with white pinstripes. Over the years, the appearance of Ugly Stik rods evolved into the now recognizable “red and yellow basket weave” design near the handle, a shiny black finish, and a clear tip.

Shakespeare did not just manufacture fishing tackle. During World War I, their “factory was converted to manufacture mortar fuses and automobile carburetors”. In World War II, Shakespeare manufactured controls for tanks, automobiles, and aircraft. “Shakespeare also manufactured the first fiberglass radio antennas, golf club shafts, pool cues, archery equipment, and numerous industrial materials”. From 1968 to 1986, Shakespeare manufactured trolling motors. Today, Shakespeare also sells non-fishing related Ugly Stik products, such as car decals, hats, glasses, and clothing.
