= Napier Company (jewellery) =

American jewelry manufacturing company

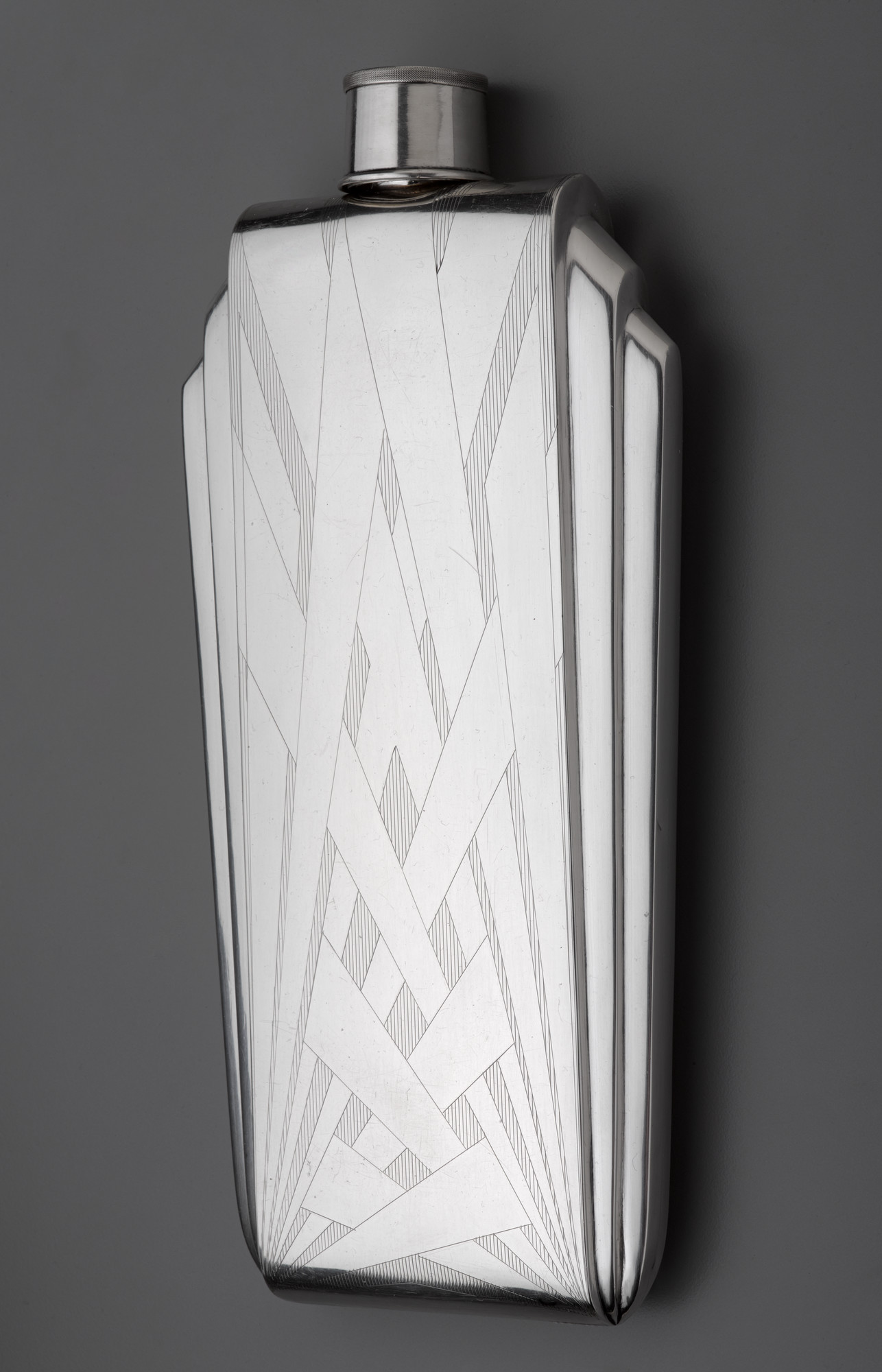
The Napier Company (1922-present). Flask, 1925-1930. Sterling silver and cork, 9 5/8 x 4 1/2 x 1 3/16in. (24.4 x 11.4 x 3cm). Brooklyn Museum, Modernism Benefit Fund

The Napier Company is an American jewelry manufacturing company, and was one of the first modern corporations in the United States. The company is also known historically as a cutting-edge silver object manufacturer.

== History ==
The Napier Company got its start in North Attleboro, Massachusetts 1878, under the name of The E. A. Bliss Co., manufacturing gilt men's watch chains. In 1882, the company became incorporated as The E. A. Bliss Company with the word "The" as part of its legal name. The company relocated to Meriden, Connecticut in 1890, after the company sustained rapid growth in the previous decade. During World War I (and again in World War II), they ceased production of jewelry, and instead focused on producing war-related items, such as medallions and medals. James H. Napier became president of the company in 1920, and the company was renamed, The Napier-Bliss Co. In 1922, the company again changed its name to The Napier Co.

== Timeline ==
The company was known for its ability to be on the forefront of fashion and design and had a history of sending its designers to Europe. In 1925, James Napier attended the World's Fair Exposition Internationale des Artes Decoratifs et Industriels Modernes in Paris, and brought back with him business ideas, including designs influenced by Parisian and European fashion. Mr. Napier himself, did not design jewelry. James Napier worked for the company from 1914 to his death in 1960. From 1920 to 1960 he served as president. In 1999, the company was bought by Victoria & Company. The plant in Meriden, Connecticut was closed by Victoria & Company on October 15, 1999. However, under the umbrella of Jones Apparel Group, Napier jewelry is still being manufactured and distributed.

== Jewelry designs ==
In the 1920s and 1930s, Napier designed necklaces, bracelets and earrings in a range of styles including, designs featuring Egyptian motifs, such as cobras, Victorian Revival designs and Deco-style motifs. The company produced very little jewelry during the 1930s, focusing on its giftware lines. In the 1940s, most of the jewelry produced was sterling silver tailored pieces. In the 1950s, it produced jewelry in a wide range of styles. Napier jewelry is notable for its simple, modern, geometric and floral designs. However, the company also produce boutique and high-end jewelry. Some of the metalwork bears resemblance to Mexican and Scandinavian designs. The fan jewelry collection was introduced as a 10-year fundraising commitment in 1955. In the 1950s, the Napier Company presented First Lady Mamie Eisenhower with a bracelet bearing an elephant design, which was reputedly one of her favorite pieces of jewelry, and which she wore often, and the Napier Company gifted the contestants of the 1955 Miss America Pageant with fashion jewelry.

== Historical silver designs ==
Napier silver designs from the first half of the 20th century are in museum collections including the Brooklyn Museum, Newark Museum and a substantial collection at the Dallas Museum of Art. Over the years, Napier silver has been featured in museum exhibitions, including Modernism in American Silver: 20th Century Design at the Smithsonian in Washington, the Dallas Museum of Art, the Wolfsonian in Miami Beach, the Nevada Museum of Art in Reno, and the Dixon Gallery and Gardens in Memphis, TN (2005–07). Napier designs have also been included in two shows at the Brooklyn Museum, entitled 19th century Modern (2011–12; 2013–15). In November 2016-November 2017, the iconic Napier penguin cocktail shaker is the lead design of a Dallas Museum of Art exhibition Shaken, stirred, styled: The art of the cocktail.

== Trademark ==
From 1922 through the 2000s, the Napier trademark in block was used. The trademark in its script form was introduced in 1965 and was used both singly or in conjunction with the block letter Napier trademark. How the trademark appeared on a piece, stamped, embossed, or on a plaque, was based on the design of the piece.

== Gallery ==
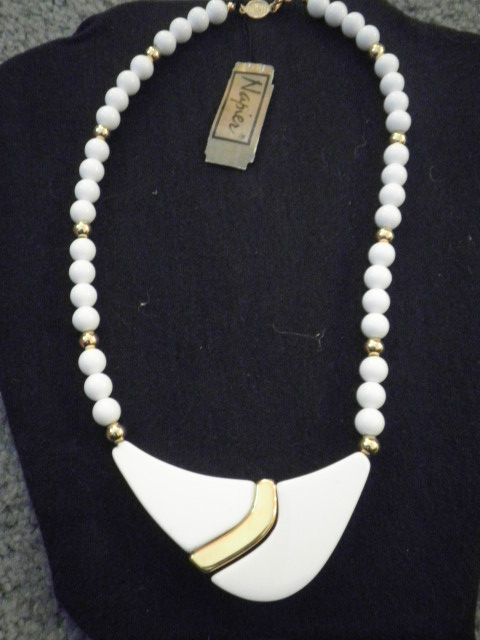
Napier necklace with tag.

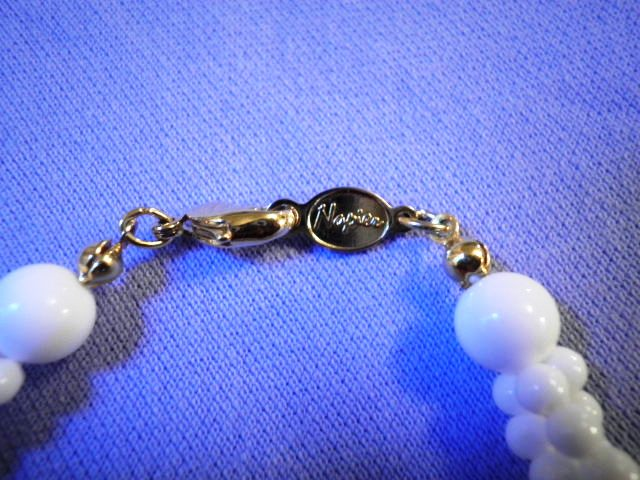
Napier jewelry logo

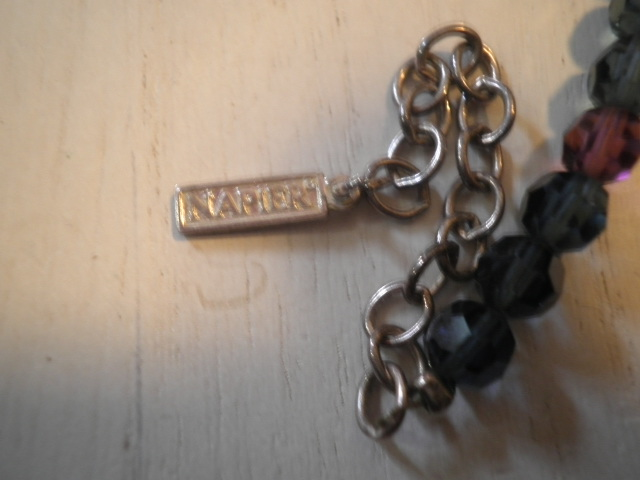
Napier jewelry logo

== See also ==
- Lapidary Journal Jewelry Artist
