= Rithum =

American e-commerce company

- Type: Private
- Traded as: Formerly: Nasdaq: CHUBA; Nasdaq: CHUBK; NYSE: ECON
- Industry: Ecommerce; Marketing automation
- Predecessor: Commerce Technologies, Inc., Albany, New York
- Founded: October 1997; 28 years ago
- Founder: Frank Poore; Richard Jones
- Headquarters: Latham, New York; London, England
- Area served: United States, Canada, United Kingdom
- Key people: Lou Keyes (CEO); Caitlin Hauser (CFO); Greg Banning (CRO); Janay Jesperson (CHRO); Doug Wolfson (General Counsel)
- Products: Virtual marketplaces; Webstores; Inventory management
- Services: Cloud-based ecommerce; Order and fulfillment management; Digital marketing
- Website: rithum.com

Rithum (formerly CommerceHub and ChannelAdvisor) is an online commerce operations software company that provides tools for brands and retailers to manage product listings, inventory and order workflows, and performance reporting across multiple ecommerce channels. The company operates a partner network that connects brands to marketplaces and retail sites, and supports integrations used for marketplace and drop-ship programs.

== Products and services ==
Rithum’s platform is designed to let customers manage product and order operations across multiple channels (including marketplaces, webstores, and first-party retail programs) from a single interface, with capabilities that include listing and inventory management, order and fulfillment management, and performance reporting.

Rithum markets "Marketplace Listings" functionality that supports distributing and maintaining product listings across hundreds of marketplaces and retail destinations, along with automation and diagnostics for listing errors and channel updates.

The company also supports retailer-oriented operations such as drop shipping program integrations (including purchase order acceptance, ship notifications, invoicing, and inventory feeds) and delivery tooling, such as delivery date prediction and shipping optimization.

== Company history ==
The company was created through the combined acquisitions of CommerceHub, founded in 1997 in New York, and ChannelAdvisor, founded in 2001 in North Carolina, both of which developed multichannel commerce platforms for large retailers and brands. In November 2022, CommerceHub completed its acquisition of ChannelAdvisor, bringing the two businesses under common ownership. In December 2023, the combined company rebranded as Rithum, unifying the CommerceHub and ChannelAdvisor offerings under a single corporate identity.

=== History of ChannelAdvisor ===
ChannelAdvisor was a multichannel ecommerce software business that now forms part of Rithum (formerly CommerceHub and ChannelAdvisor). Founded in 2001 and headquartered in Morrisville, North Carolina, ChannelAdvisor developed cloud-based tools to help brands and retailers manage product listings, digital advertising, and sales across online marketplaces and other ecommerce channels. In November 2022, ChannelAdvisor was acquired by CommerceHub in a take-private transaction, and following CommerceHub’s subsequent rebranding as Rithum in 2023, ChannelAdvisor’s technology and operations were integrated into Rithum’s broader connected commerce platform.

=== History of CommerceHub ===
CommerceHub provided software for dropshipping, marketplace, digital marketing, and delivery management, providing integration and fulfillment services to both online and brick and mortar retailers, distributors, and supplier companies.

CommerceHub was formed in 1997 to develop e-commerce integration services for the sharing of data and business processes between trading partners. As online retailing was developing, merchants were fulfilling orders via "virtual merchant" business models, selling online and fulfilling orders via drop shipping. Founder Frank Poore, a logistics expert familiar with retailer order management systems, recognized the growing online business was attracting retailers that had never sold direct and would change the way retailers and manufacturers needed to communicate to make drop shipping work.

Merchant data transmitted via a value-added network (VAN) was generally formatted as electronic data interchange (EDI). Online businesses found EDI was too cumbersome to accommodate all the file formats and business rules the growing volume of e-commerce retailers required. CommerceHub developed a web-based approach to serve e-commerce integration needs with their Universal Connection Hub, a translation engine that provides integration to translate and normalize supply chain communications, and enable electronic processing of purchase orders, change orders, and remittance confirmations in native file format. The Universal Connection Hub supports industry communications and file format options including web browser, VPN, VAN, FTP, web services, HTTPS, EDI, XML, flat files, spreadsheets, and others.

In 1998 drop-ship fulfillment services were added to the connectivity hub to provide management and monitoring of the order fulfillment life cycle. CommerceHub’s DropShip Master provided order tracking, visibility, and event management with automated exception alerts to customizable business rules.

In August 2000 CommerceHub received a multimillion-dollar investment from Interactive Technology Holdings, LLC, and announced the signing of a contract with iQVC, the online retailing division of QVC, to provide electronic business communications between iQVC and its participating vendors to automate management of iQVC customer service operations from point of sale through delivery. The company became profitable in 2002 with the signing of four Top 20 retailers. By 2003 CommerceHub had signed on 10 major e-commerce retailers and announced in 2004 that its network of integrated clients was approaching one thousand organizations representing nearly a million unique product SKUs.

CommerceHub was acquired by QK Holdings, a supply-chain management company, in an all-cash transaction, announced in August 2006. That same year Stephen Hamlin, former vice president of operations at QVC.com, joined the company as CEO.

CommerceHub went public in 2016 and was traded on NASDAQ. In May of 2018 it was acquired for $1.1 billion by GTCR and Sycamore Partners private equity firms, who took it private.

CommerceHub acquired DSCO Inc. based out Lehi, Utah in November of 2020. A month later, in December 2020, Insight Partners acquired a majority stake in CommerceHub for an estimated $1.9 billion.

In December 2023, CommerceHub acquired Cadeera and rebranded the company as Rithum.

== Customers ==
Rithum has cited customers and partners that include retailers and brands such as Adidas, Best Buy, The Home Depot, and Zalando. In December 2025, Digital Commerce 360 reported that Best Buy expanded marketplace access through a Rithum integration, allowing merchants to manage onboarding, content, pricing, and fulfillment for Best Buy Marketplace alongside other channels.

== Recent developments ==
In September 2025, Rithum introduced RithumIQ, which the company describes as an AI engine embedded in its platform to provide automated recommendations and operational insights across commerce workflows.

In December 2025, Rithum announced a partnership with Stripe tied to agentic commerce use cases, describing the collaboration as combining product catalog optimization and order orchestration with Stripe payments infrastructure.
