= Maišiagala Eldership =

Maišiagala Eldership Maišiagalos seniūnija
- Eldership
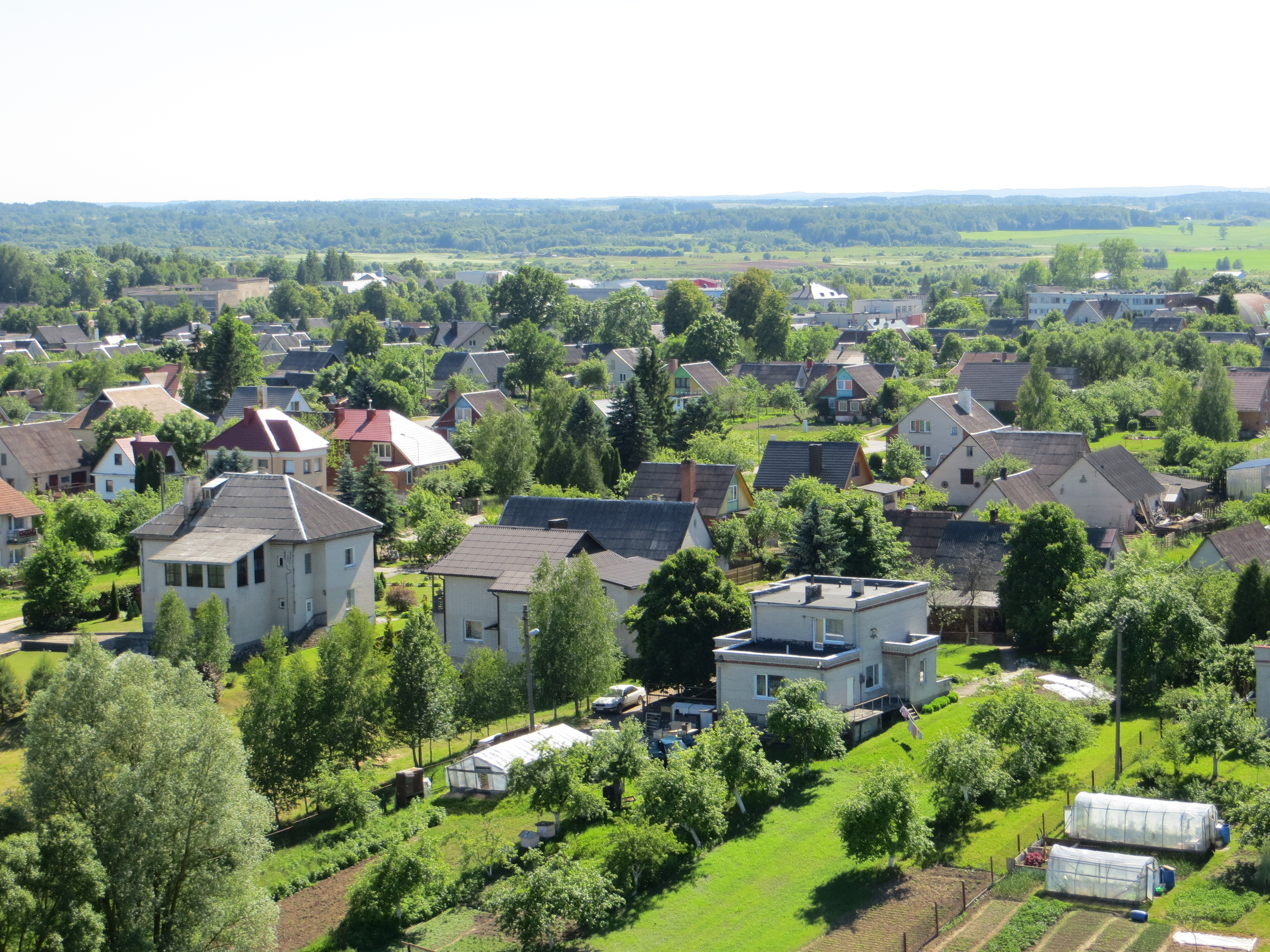

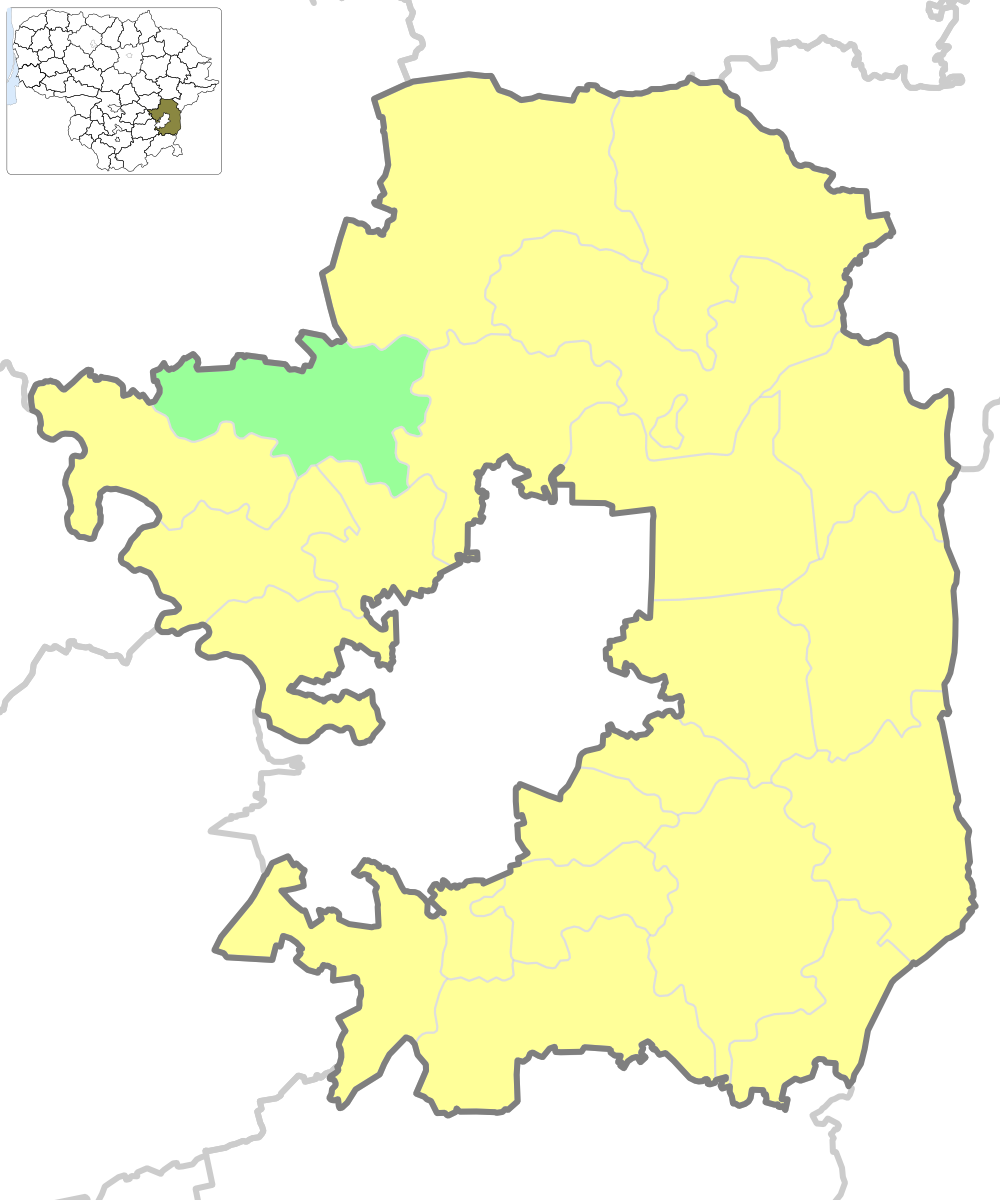
- Location of Maišiagala Eldership
- Country: Lithuania
- Ethnographic region: Dzūkija
- County: Vilnius County
- Municipality: Vilnius District Municipality
- Administrative centre: Maišiagala

Area
  - Total: 101 km^{2} (39 sq mi)

Population
  - Total: 2,822
  - Density: 27.9/km^{2} (72.4/sq mi)
- Time zone: UTC+2 (EET)
  - Summer (DST): UTC+3 (EEST)
- Website: https://www.vrsa.lt

Maišiagala Eldership (Lithuanian: Maišiagalos seniūnija) is an eldership in Lithuania, located in Vilnius District Municipality, west of Vilnius.

== Ethnic composition ==
According to 2011 National Census data, the ethnic composition is as follows:

- Poles - 50%
- Lithuanians - 32%
- Russians - 13%
