= Coldwater Creek (clothing retailer) =

Clothing retailer

- Coldwater Creek Store located in Manchester, Connecticut.
- Type: Private
- Traded as: Nasdaq: CWTR
- Industry: Clothing
- Founded: 1984; 42 years ago
- Founders: Dennis Pence; Ann Pence
- Products: Clothing, shoes, accessories, home décor
- Owner: Newtimes Group
- Website: coldwatercreek.com

Coldwater Creek is an e-commerce, and formerly brick and mortar American women's clothing and accessories retailer.

== History ==
=== From startup to profitability (1984–1986) ===
In 1984, Dennis and Ann Pence relocated from Manhattan to the resort town of Sandpoint in northern Idaho to start a direct mail business. They bootstrapped the business with savings of only $40,000. Early catalogs were printed in one color by the local newspaper. The first four-color catalog, called Northcountry, was published in 1985. Writing and design were handled in house, leveraging Ann's background as a copy director for Macy's. Northcountry took the then-unusual approach of depicting apparel without models and describing products with colorful prose. By 1986 the company had achieved profitability and had fewer than 10 employees.

=== Rapid sales growth (1987–2006) ===
By 1990, millions of catalogs were being mailed to its own customers and rented mailing lists. In 1991 and 1992 major investments were made in upgrading computer systems and new executives were hired to help manage growth. In 1991 revenues had reached approximately $11 million delivering a profit of $1.6 million. Sales were $18.8 million in 1992. In 1993 the company launched a second catalog title, called Spirit of the West. A third catalog title, Ecosong, was added in 1994 along with the Coldwater Creek Credit Card. Between 1994 and 1996 the company invested heavily in information technology along with distribution and call center capacity. A new call center was opened in Coeur d'Alene, ID. In addition, the company's first retail store was opened in Sandpoint, ID. The company achieved sales of $75.9 million and earnings of $5.6 million in 1995. In its 1996 earnings release CEO Dennis Pence said "This year marks the sixth consecutive year of growth for the Company....". Sales grew 88.5% from the prior year, coming in at $143.1 million. Net Income was $7.7 million. The company launched a fourth catalog title, Milepost Four, targeting men. The title was sold to another company a few years later. In 1997 the company raised $37.5 million through an IPO. Dennis and Ann Pence retained 75% ownership of the company. By that year 10% of the company's sales were coming from Japan and Canada. Sales for the year grew by a torrid 72.4%, reaching $246.7 million. Net income came in at $11.7 million. Annual sales in 1999 hit $328.3 million and net income was $13.7 million (excluding costs associated with selling Milepost Four). At the end of the fiscal year the company had begun the rollout of a new catalog title, Natural Elements. Management was very focused on growing its internet business this year, stating "Coldwater Creek's objective is to derive 25% of its revenue through its e-commerce site by the end of fiscal 2000. Moreover, management's goal is to obtain a 5% market share of the US on-line market for women's apparel sales during fiscal year 2000" in its year end earnings release. The company also opened a new call center and distribution center in Parkersburg, WV to keep up with growth during the year. In 2001 Georgia Shonk-Simmons took over as CEO. Dennis Pence returned to the position after a year and a half in September 2002. From 2002 to 2004 the company focused on opening new retail stores, going from 41 in 2002 to 114 in 2004. By 2003 the company delivered sales of $473.1 million and $9.15 million in profit. Sales were $518.8 million in 2004, up 9.7% from the previous year. Net Income was $12.3 million. In May 2004 the company raised $41 million in a secondary stock offering. Growth accelerated in 2005, with sales up 13.8% to $590.3 million with an also growing profit of $29.1 million. With the goal of increasing the percentage of its direct sourced merchandise from 15% to 30%, the company opened an office in Hong Kong during the last fiscal month of the year. The company also began a 350,000 square foot expansion of its distribution center in Parkersburg, WV in the fourth quarter of 2005. In 2006 the company experienced massive growth, with sales increasing by 32% to $779.7 million paired with $41.6 million in net income. The same year the company opened 6 test spa locations, referred to as Coldwater Creek ~ The Spa.

=== $1 billion mark reached (2007–2013) ===
In October 2007 Dennis Pence retired as CEO once again, succeeded by Daniel Griesemer. 2007 revenue exceeded $1 billion for the first time growing 35.2% from the prior year. This would be the last profitable year as a public company, with net income of $55.3 million. At the end of 2007 the company had 306 premium retail stores, up from 239 at the end of the previous year, a net increase of 67. In the year end earnings call, management indicated that "the chain target is somewhere between 500 and 550 stores". 2008 was Dan Griesemer's first and only full year as CEO of the company. Annual revenue hit an all-time high that year, coming in at $1.15 billion but the company lost $2.5 million, the first annual loss since 1985. The company ended the year with a strong balance sheet, with $81 million in cash. A big focus for management was to "remain focused on further reducing our cost structure and preserving our cash as business conditions warrant." $30 million in SG&A expense reductions were identified and capital expenses were reduced significantly from the previous year heading into 2009. In September 2009 Dennis Pence returned as CEO, saying in a statement that he was named CEO to bring the company a "return to profitability". Revenue for 2009 reached $1.04 billion, with net loss $56 million for the year. 2010 continued to be challenging, with revenue dropping to $981 million paired with a net loss of $44.1 million. In May 2010, Georgia Shonk Simmons retired as president and CMO, replaced by Jerome Jessup. The strength of the business continued to deteriorate, with revenue dropping to $773 million in 2011. The company's net loss for the year grew to $99.7 million. In July 2012, seeking to shore up a weak cash balance, the company secured a $65 million loan from Golden Gate Capital. Prior to the end of 2012, which would produce further erosion in revenue at $742 million for the year and a loss of $81.8 million, Dennis Pence once again retired. Jill Dean was promoted from her position as Chief Merchandising Officer to president and CEO. 2013 was another tough year despite the change in leadership. In October of that year the company announced restructuring aimed at cutting $20 to $25 million in expenses. It eliminated close to 100 jobs, including its number 2 executive, Jerome Jessup. Revenue dropped to $742 million and the company lost $81.8 million. The company's cash position had dropped to $21.7 million.

=== 2014 bankruptcy ===
On April 11, 2014, Coldwater Creek announced that it was filing for Chapter 11 bankruptcy, listing $278.5 million in assets and $361.3 million in debt. In a statement the company said that it had “engaged in a thorough analysis of all potential alternatives” but had failed to find a buyer or a source of funds to support continued operations. As of the bankruptcy announcement the company employed 339 employees at its corporate headquarters and 5,500 others elsewhere. Plans were made to start liquidating inventory and assets. Operations ceased as of early summer 2014.

=== First relaunch (2014–2020) ===
In June 2014, Sycamore Partners, owner of brands including Talbots, Nine West, and Stuart Weitzman, purchased Coldwater Creek's intellectual property (use of the name, logo and customer list) through CWC Direct LLC, and opened new headquarters in Hingham, Massachusetts. On November 3, 2014, Coldwater Creek was relaunched as a digitally native and catalog retailer. In early 2018, a new Coldwater Creek store opened in Burlington, Massachusetts, the company's first brick-and-mortar format store in three years. As of February 2020, the company operated thirteen physical retail stores, all located in the United States. On July 20, 2020, Comenity Bank, holder of the Coldwater Creek credit card program, sent an email which told borrowers, "Coldwater Creek has informed us that any Coldwater Creek merchandise purchased on or after July 6, 2020, will be final sale and not eligible for returns." The company transitioned back to being exclusively a digitally native format and eliminated its 13 brick-and-mortar format locations which it blamed on the COVID-19 pandemic. Most of the locations had not re-opened since shutting down for the outbreak of the pandemic.

=== Second relaunch (2020 and beyond) ===
In September 2020, Coldwater Creek's inventory and intellectual property assets were acquired in a $12.2 million deal with Hong Kong procurement company Newtimes Group. Coldwater Creek's new website went live on December 12, 2020, and Newtimes plans to relaunch its catalog, as well.
