= Howald (surname) =

Howald is a German-language surname. Notable people with the surname include:

- Florian Howald, Swiss orienteering competitor
- Martin Howald, Swiss orienteering competitor
- Patrick Howald, Swiss professional ice hockey player (retired)
- Arthur M. Howald, inventor of fishing rods, see Ugly Stik
