= LensCrafters =

American optician and eyewear retail chain

- Industry: Eye care
- Founded: March 1983; 43 years ago
- Founders: E. Dean Butler
- Headquarters: Mason, Ohio, U.S.
- Number of locations: 1,158
- Areas served: United States; Canada; Puerto Rico; Hong Kong; India
- Products: Eyewear, glasses, sunglasses
- Parent: United States Shoe Corporation (1984–1995); Luxottica (1995–2018); EssilorLuxottica (2018-present)
- Website: www.lenscrafters.com

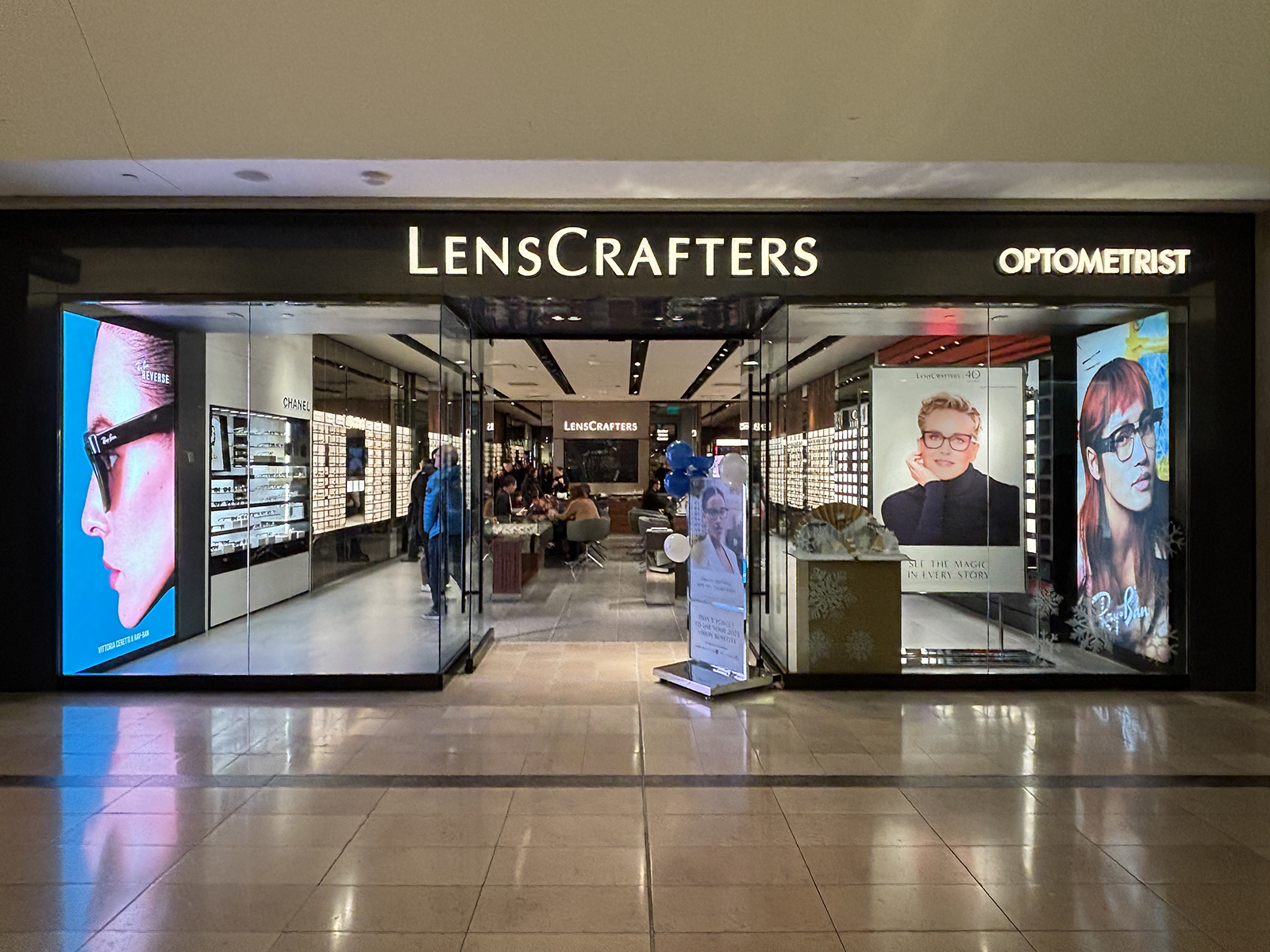
LensCrafters Optique store in Sherway Gardens, Toronto, Canada

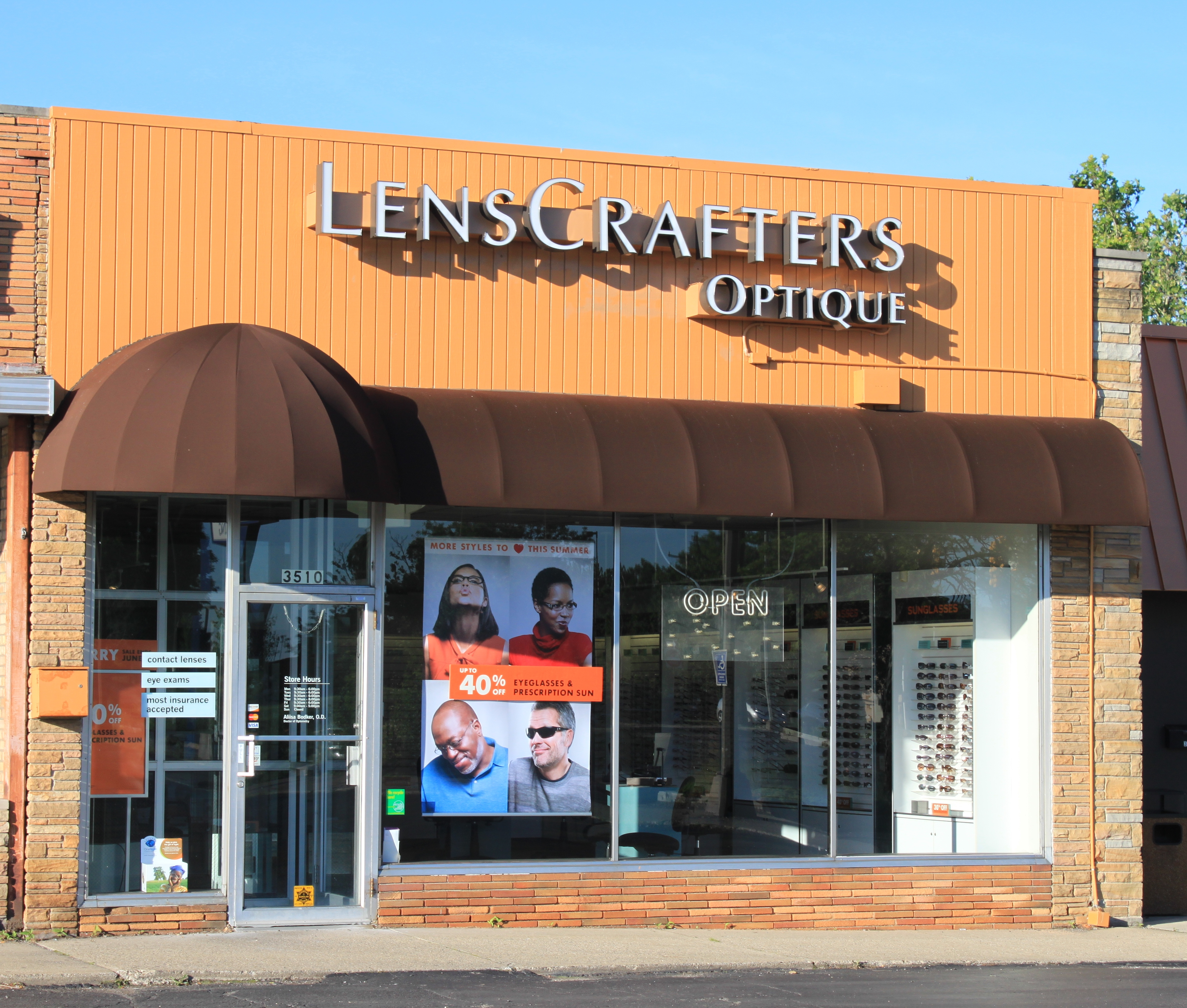
LensCrafters Optique store in Ann Arbor, MI

LensCrafters is an international retailer of prescription eyewear and prescription sunglasses. Its stores usually host independent optometrists on-site or in an adjacent store. The company has its corporate headquarters in Mason, Ohio, a suburb of Cincinnati in the US.

LensCrafters has been a wholly owned subsidiary of Luxottica (now part of EssilorLuxottica), the largest eyewear company in the world) since 1995. At the end of 2018, Luxottica operated 1,158 LensCrafters stores, of which 1,050 are located in North America and 108 are located in Vietnam, China, Hong Kong and India.

== History ==
LensCrafters was founded in March 1983 by E. Dean Butler, who had been a manager with Procter & Gamble. Butler first developed the idea for a "while you wait" eyeglass retailer after helping a Procter & Gamble colleague produce television commercials for a family optical business in the late 1970s.

LensCrafters achieved sales of $2 million in its first year of operation before Butler sold the company to the United States Shoe Corporation in 1984. Butler remained as LensCrafters' CEO until 1988.

LensCrafters had just three locations when U.S. Shoe purchased it; by 1989, there were 350 locations, and LensCrafters was generating 40% of U.S. Shoe's operating income.

In 1992, LensCrafters surpassed Pearle Vision to become the largest chain of eyeglass retailers in the United States, with roughly $660 million in annual revenue.

In 1995, Luxottica launched a hostile takeover attempt of U.S. Shoe, with the goal of acquiring LensCrafters. Luxottica announced in April 1995, that it had reached an agreement to purchase U.S. Shoe for $1.4 billion.

Luxottica acquired Pearle Vision in 2004, combining the country's two largest eyewear retailers. Though most locations can still provide glasses and frames same-day, that line of business has become de-emphasized over time for the luxury market.
