= William Shakespeare (inventor) =

American inventor

William Shakespeare Jr.
- Born: September 21, 1869; Kalamazoo, Michigan
- Died: June 25, 1950 (aged 80); Melbourne, Florida
- Occupations: Businessperson, entrepreneur, mayor and inventor
- Known for: Inventing the level-winding fishing reel

William Shakespeare Jr. (September 21, 1869 – June 25, 1950) was an American inventor.

Shakespeare was born to William Shakespeare, Sr. and Lydia A. Markley in Kalamazoo, Michigan, in 1869.

He invented the level-winding fishing reel. Shakespeare also founded and was one of the key people of Shakespeare Fishing Tackle, which he founded in 1897, as a fisherman aiming to improve the fishing-reel mechanism.

He was a traveling salesman of patent medicines.

In addition to numerous fishing-tackle innovations, Shakespeare also received patents for camera equipment and a carburetor.

Shakespeare also served as the mayor of Kalamazoo from 1933-1935.

== See also ==
- List of inventors
- Lists of Americans
