= Shakespeare Fishing Tackle =

American tackle company

The Shakespeare Company
- Company type: Subsidiary
- Industry: Fishing Tackle
- Founded: 1897; 129 years ago Kalamazoo, Michigan, U.S.
- Headquarters: Columbia, South Carolina, U.S.
- Products: Fishing Rods, Reels, Tackle, and accessories.
- Parent: Pure Fishing
- Website: http://www.shakespeare-fishing.com/index.html

The Shakespeare Company is a subsidiary of Pure Fishing which manufactures fishing equipment. It was founded by William Shakespeare Jr. in Kalamazoo, Michigan in 1897. It was moved to Columbia, South Carolina in 1970.

In June 2005, approximately 438,000 of their children's fishing kits were recalled after being found to contain lead paint.
