= Nine West Holdings =

American company

- Type: Private
- Industry: Fashion
- Founder: Sidney Kimmel
- Headquarters: New York City, United States
- Number of employees: 6,000

Nine West Holdings (formerly The Jones Group and Jones Apparel Group) is an American designer, marketer and wholesaler of branded clothing, shoes and accessories. In 2019, the company restructured under the new name Premier Brands Group Holdings Llc.

== Operations ==
Nine West Holding headquarters are in New York City. The company also markets directly to consumers through their chain of specialty retail and value-based stores. In addition, it markets costume jewelry under the Givenchy brand licensed from Givenchy Corporation and footwear under the Dockers Women brand licensed from Levi Strauss & Co.

== History ==
In 1970, Sidney Kimmel founded and became President of the Jones Apparel Division of W.R. Grace & Co. Together with Grace accountant Gerard Rubin, Kimmel bought Grace's fashion division in 1975, incorporating it as Jones Apparel Group. Jones expanded quickly by bringing out new labels and licensing others, such as Christian Dior.In the early 1980s, Jones Apparel offered the sweatsuit fashions of Norma Kamali, and in 1984 they acquired the license for the Gloria Vanderbilt line from Murjani. In the early 1990s, the company expanded with new lines Rena Rowan and Jones & Co. In 1999, Jones Apparel acquired Nine West. In 2004, the company purchased luxury department store chain Barneys New York for $400 million, and sold it, in September 2007, to Dubai-based investment firm Istithmar for $942.3 million.

In December 2013, Sycamore Partners, which is managed by Stefan L. Kaluzny, purchased the Jones Group for about US$2.2 billion. Wesley Card is the CEO of The Jones Group. In 2014, Sycamore split Jones into six different companies: Nine West Group, One Jeanswear Group, Jones New York, the Kasper Group, Stuart Weitzman and Kurt Geiger. The Jones Group was renamed Nine West Holdings and became parent to Nine West Group and One Jeanswear Group. Later in 2014, Anne Klein, Easy Spirit and NW Jewelry Group were split into separate operating companies of Nine West.

In 2014, Brian Atwood was sold to Steve Madden. In 2015, Stuart Weitzman was sold to Coach and Jones New York was sold to Authentic Brands Group.

In December 2016, Easy Spirit was sold to Marc Fisher Footwear. The Kasper Group was then purchased and incorporated under the parent company Nine West Holdings in January 2017. In January 2017, the company appointed Joel Oblonsky as the CEO of the company.

== Bankruptcy ==
Nine West Holdings filed for chapter 11 bankruptcy in April 2018. In July 2018, the namesake Nine West brand, as well as the Bandolino shoe brand, were sold to Authentic Brands Group. Bondholders have accused Sycamore Partners, the private equity firm that purchased Nine West Holdings in 2014, of carving out valuable company assets to sell to itself, thus ensuring a profit for the fund even as the company itself headed toward bankruptcy, and argue that the company could be hurt if Sycamore-owned department store chain Belk threatens to refuse to buy from the company if the bankruptcy settlement isn't approved.

The company emerged from bankruptcy in March 2019 and renamed itself Premier Brands Group. Divisions include One Jeanswear Group, The Jewelry Group, Kasper Group and Anne Klein.

== Brands ==
Nine West Holdings' brands include:

- Anne Klein
- Bandolino (sold to Authentic Brands Group in 2018)
- Nine West (sold to Authentic Brands Group in 2018)
  - Enzo Angiolini
  - Circa Joan & David
- The Jewelry Group (Formerly NW Jewelry)
  - Givenchy Jewelry
  - Judith Jack
  - Napier
- ONE Jeanswear Group
  - Energie
  - Gloria Vanderbilt
  - GLO Jeans
  - Jessica Simpson Jeanswear
  - l.e.i.
  - Bandolino
- The Kasper Group
  - Albert Nipon
  - Anne Klein
  - Evan Picone
  - Kasper
  - Le Suit
  - Nine West
  - Martha Stewart
- Daisy Fuentes
- Skinny Girl
