= Nine West =

American online footwear retailer

- Type: Public
- Industry: Fashion
- Founded: 1983; 43 years ago Solow Building, Manhattan, New York City, U.S.
- Founders: Jerome Fisher; Vince Camuto
- Defunct: 2018 (retail stores only)
- Headquarters: White Plains, New York, U.S., U.S.
- Parent: Nine West Holdings (1999–2018); Authentic Brands Group (2018–present)

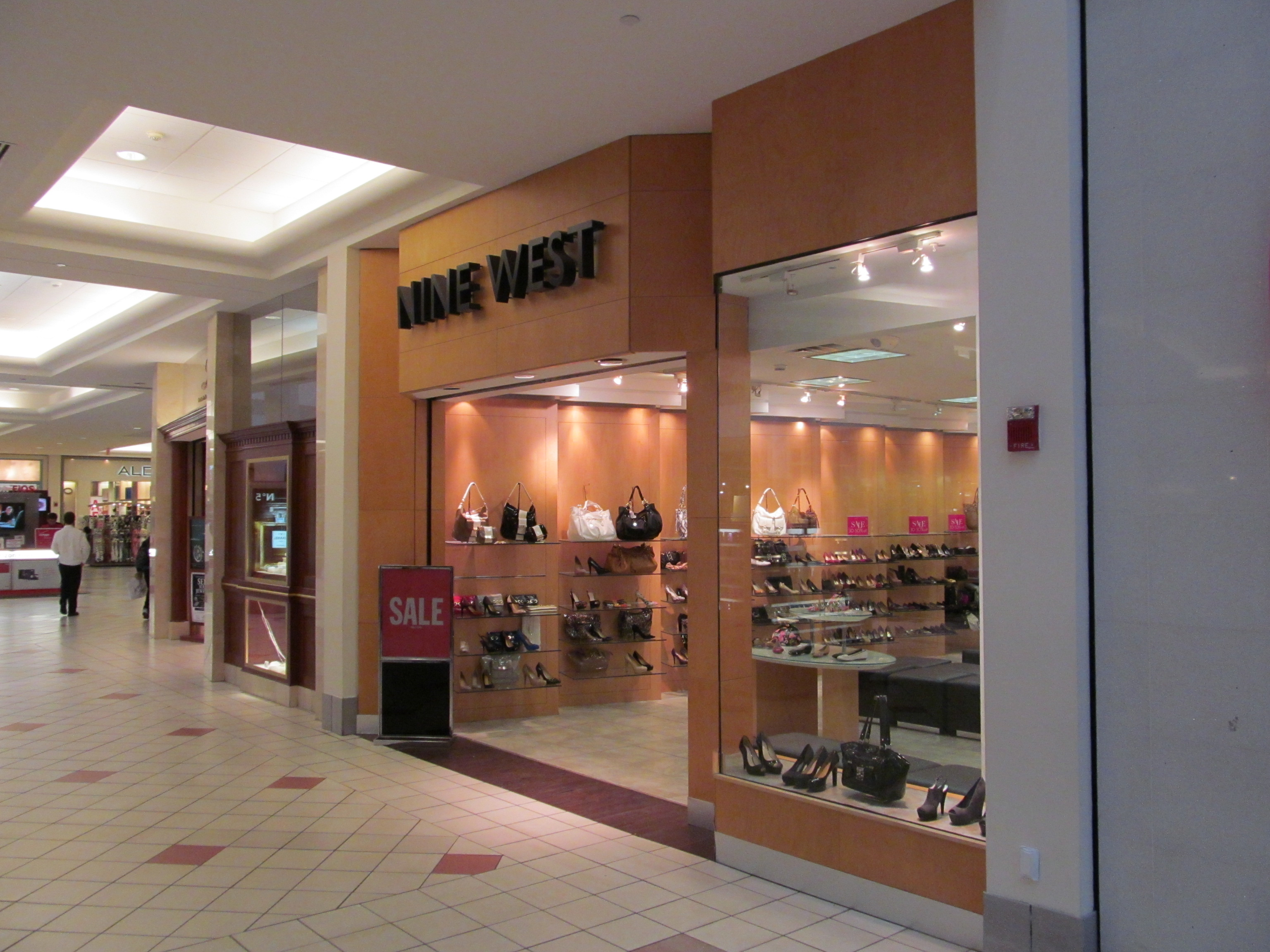
Nine West at South Shore Plaza in Braintree, Massachusetts

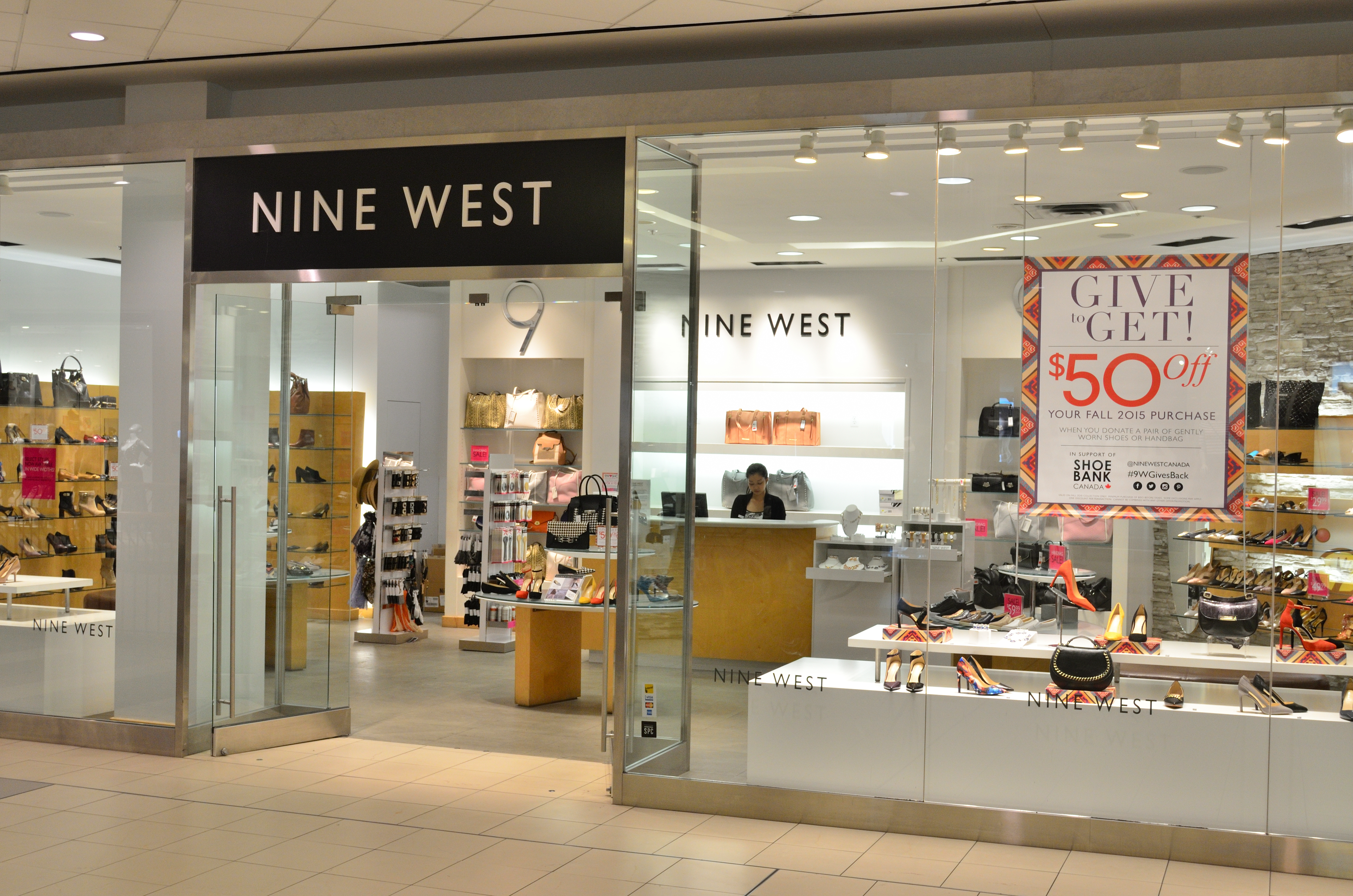
Nine West in CF Promenade

Nine West (formerly known as 9 West) is an American online fashion retailer that is based in White Plains, New York. It was founded in 1983 and closed its brick and mortar stores business in 2018. Its products continue to be sold at other retailers.

== History ==
Nine West was named for its founding location in the Solow Building at 9 West 57th Street in New York City. In 1983, Nine West opened its first specialty retail store in Stamford, Connecticut. In 1986, Nine West launched its first national ad campaign. Nine West first expanded internationally with the opening of a Hong Kong location in 1994. It went on to become a brand retailed in over 800 global locations in 57 countries.

Initially founded as a fashion footwear brand, Nine West expanded into handbags, sunglasses, legwear, outerwear, jewelry, belts, watches, cold weather accessories, hats, scarves and wraps, and eyewear. After the launch of handbags in 1995, Nine West expanded to dresses, suits and children's footwear. Through licensing agreements, it also offers eyewear, sunglasses, legwear, outerwear, belts, hats, cold weather accessories, scarves and wraps. In March 1995, Nine West purchased the footwear division of the United States Shoe Corporation, which included the Easy Spirit brand. As a result of the purchase, Noel Hord became CEO. In 1996, it acquired London based Pied a Terre for $5 million. In 1997, it bought the shoes concession business of UK retailer Sears plc for £9 million and the following year, bought from Sears their last shoe store chain, Cable & Co.

In 1999, Nine West was acquired by Jones Apparel Group.

In 2006, Nine West began collaborating with Vivienne Westwood, Thakoon and Sophia Kokosalaki on limited edition "capsule collections". In 2009, Nine West and New Balance collaborated to develop a collection of footwear. Fred Allard served as Creative Director starting in 2006.

On July 7, 2015, the Canadian distributor and retailer of Nine West, the Sherson Group, filed for bankruptcy protection for the Canadian locations.

In April 2018, Nine West's North American operations in the United States and Canada both filed for bankruptcy and closed all stores. The Nine West brand was then acquired out of bankruptcy by Authentic Brands Group (ABG). Later that year, ABG non-exclusively licensed the brand to Kohl's as an in-house offering.
