= Costar =

Costar may refer to:

- COmputer STored Ambulatory Record (COSTAR)
- Corrective Optics Space Telescope Axial Replacement (COSTAR)
- CoStar Group provider of commercial real estate information, marketing and analytic services
- Co–Star, a social network based on astrology
