= Nearshore =

Nearshore may refer to:

- Littoral zone, the part of a sea, lake or river which is close to the shore
- Nearshoring, the outsourcing of business processes to companies in a nearby country.
