= Womensforum =

- Website type: Women's community website
- Available in: English
- Website: womensforum.com
- Launched: 1996 (30 years ago)

Womensforum is a United States–based online community website for women.

== History ==
Based in Chicago, Illinois, it was co-created by Jodi Turek and Mark Kaufman in 1996. The network of sites aggregated and promoted content from partner websites aimed at their demographic. Womensforum.com offered content from a wide range of topics such as health, family, home, fashion, career, pop culture, and relationships. In 2000, the website obtained $17 million in financing from venture capital firm VantagePoint Venture Partners. As of April 2008, Womensforum was ranked in the top 10 U.S. gaining properties based on unique visitors. As of July 2008, Womensforum had over 40 sites in its network and received more than 6.7 million visitors each month. As of October 2009, WomensForum partner sites had grown to more than 50. Some of their partners included Babynames.com, and CopyKat.com.

== See also ==
- Pink Petro
