= Mehnert =

Mehnert is a surname. Notable people with the surname include:

- Björn Mehnert (born 1976), German football player
- George Mehnert (1881–1948), American wrestler
- Katie Mehnert (born 1975), American businesswoman
- Klaus Mehnert (1906–1984), German political scientist and journalist
- Marcus Mehnert (born 1997), Norwegian football player
- Siegfried Mehnert (born 1963), German boxer
