= The Gogo Building =

Coordinates: 41.883816°N 87.639351°W

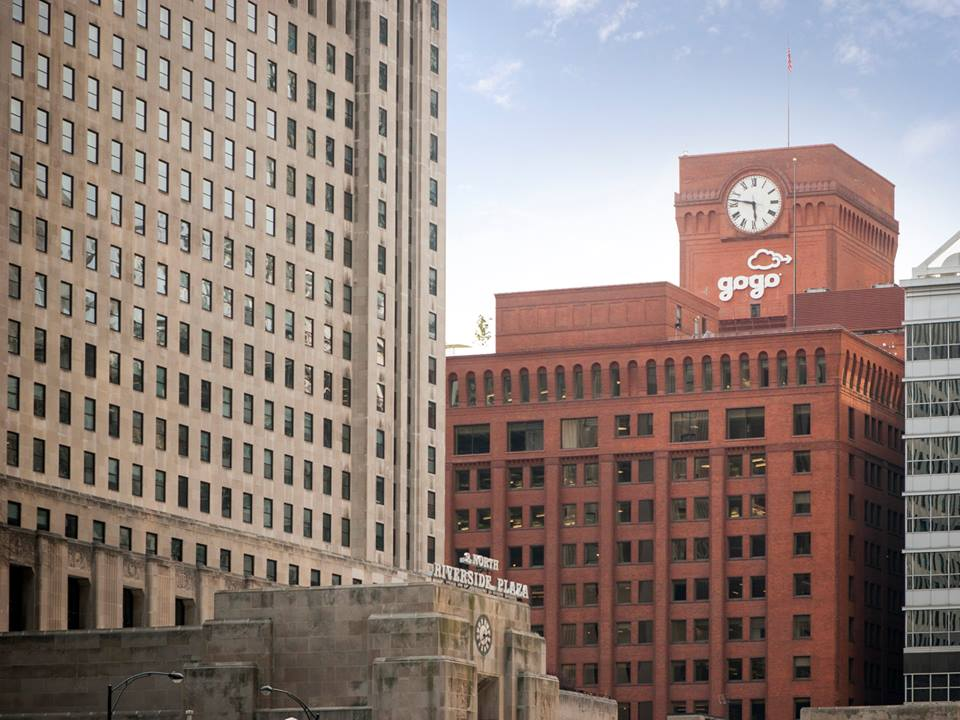
- Interactive map of the The Gogo Building area
- Former names: River Center

General information
- Type: Commercial
- Architectural style: Warehouse
- Location: 111 N. Canal Street, Chicago
- Current tenants: SES Inflight Internet; Twitter; Uber; Vivid Seats; Fieldglass; Potbelly Sandwich Works
- Completed: 1913

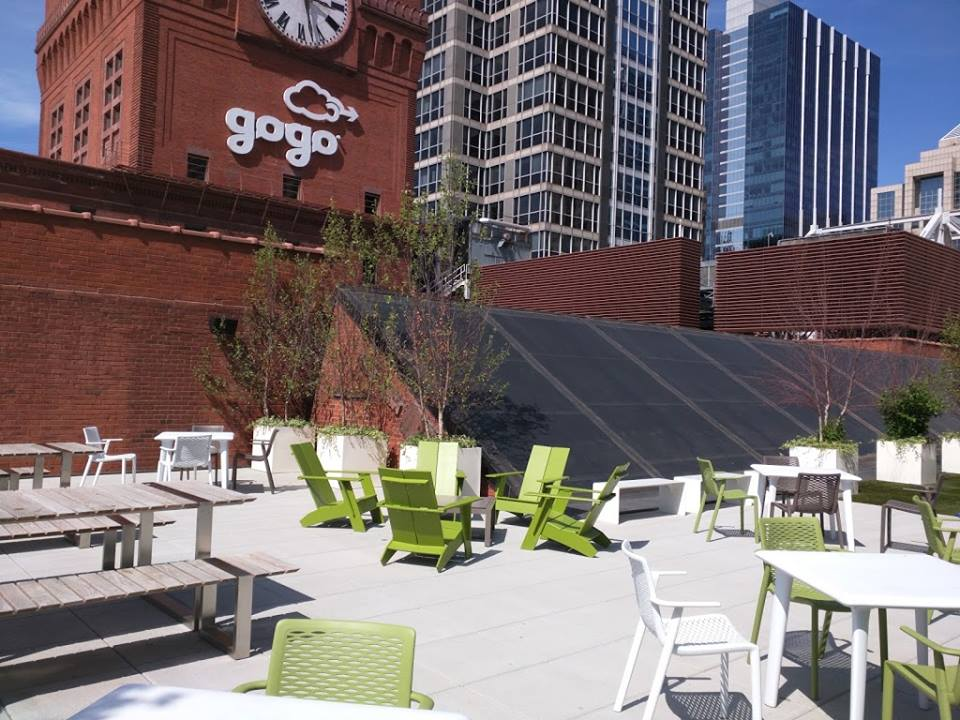
Rooftop Terrace

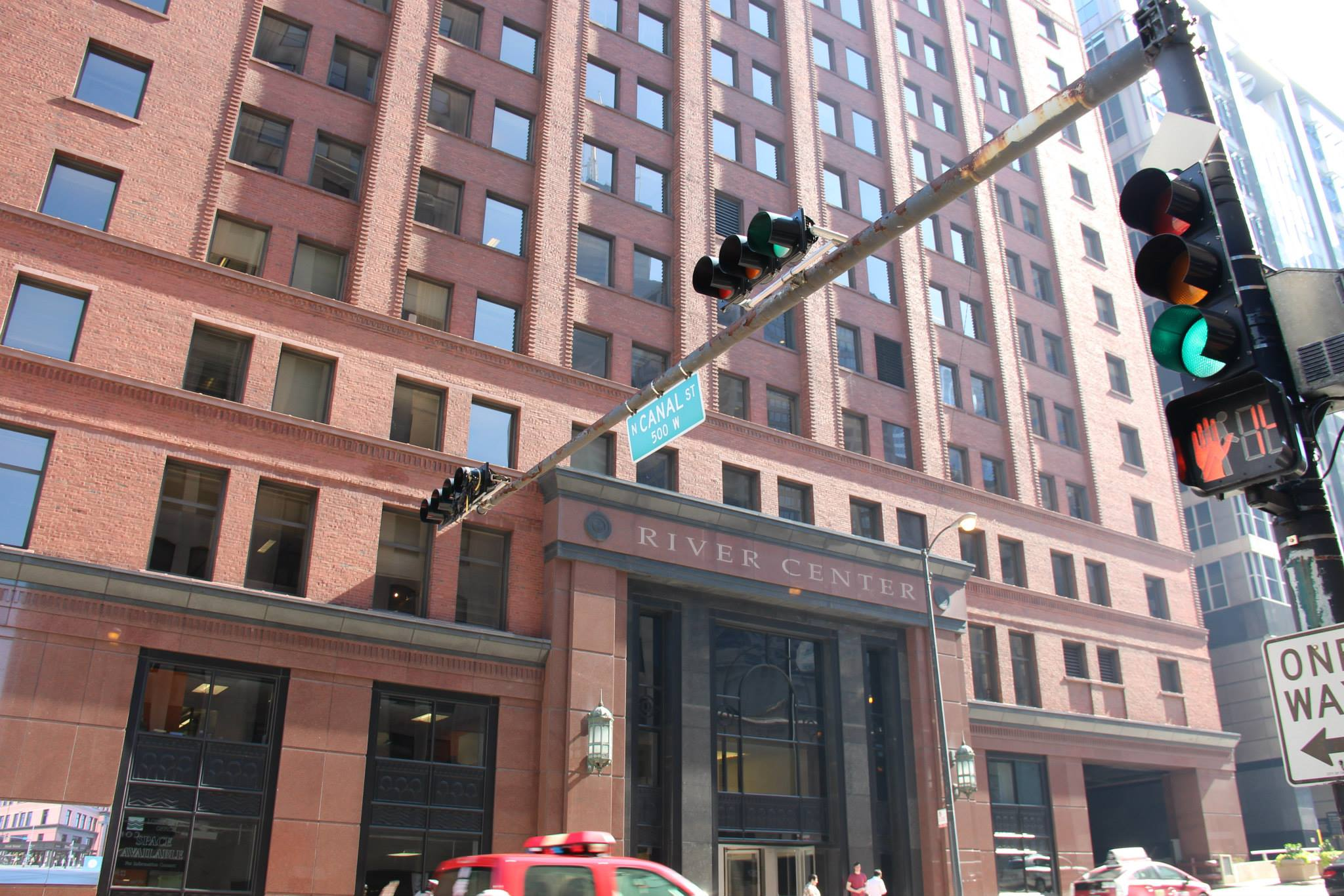
Facade

The Gogo Building, formerly known as the River Center, is an 840,000-square-foot (78,000 m^{2}) commercial building located at 111 N. Canal Street in the West Loop community area of Chicago, Illinois. Originally constructed as a warehouse in the early 1900s, the vintage, loft-style building is now home to various commercial tenants, most notably Gogo Inflight Internet, which has its logo on the cube topping the building. Other tenants include Twitter, Uber, Vivid Seats, SAP Fieldglass, and Potbelly Sandwich Works The building is one of the best surviving examples in downtown Chicago of the once vibrant industrial district along the Chicago River.

== History ==
There are two large red brick buildings along the Chicago River just south of where the river splits, formerly known as the Butler Brothers Warehouse buildings. They were both designed for the Butler Brothers Company, a mail order company, similar to Montgomery Ward and Sears & Roebuck at the time. The northern structure was designed by Daniel Burnham, a famous Chicago architect, with its completion date being 1913, a year after Burnham’s death. This building only stood for 7 years before being completely demolished and rebuilt exactly as it stood before by the Chicago Union Station Company on the adjacent lot to allow for new railroad construction along the Chicago River. The warehouse was a major shipping and distribution center at the time. In 1990, the Morton International Building, now the Boeing International Headquarters, was built on the original Butler Brothers Warehouse lot facing the river. Because of this, only the top block of The Gogo Building can now be seen from the Chicago River. The Boeing International Headquarters building was constructed with only the air rights above the railroad tracks, meaning Amtrak still owns the ground rights to the area and the tracks built in 1920 are still in service beneath the building.

In 2012, Chicago developer Sterling Bay purchased the building for $100 million. Sterling Bay invested tens of millions of dollars into renovating most of the warehouse while simultaneously signing several new leases for the building. In 2015, Sterling Bay sold the building to J.P. Morgan Asset Management for more than $305 million.
