= Little Duck =

Little Duck may refer to:

- Little Duck Creek (South Hyco Creek tributary)
- Little Duck Key, an island of the Florida Keys
- Little Duck Organics, a food industry company
- Little Duck River, a tributary of the larger Duck River in Tennessee, US
- "Little Duck", a song by Don Patterson from the 1966 album Goin' Down Home
- The protagonists of the children's song "Five Little Ducks"
- Little Duck, a film by electronic musician James Murphy
- Adina, a fictional character and the "little duck" to which the title Dulcamara, or the Little Duck and the Great Quack refers

== See also ==
- Little White Duck (disambiguation)
