= Cricket Cola =

Maryland soda company

Cricket Natural Beverages
- Type: Soft drink
- Origin: Potomac, Maryland, United States
- Introduced: 2002; 24 years ago
- Flavour: Cola, Pomegranate Raspberry, Mandarin, White Peach
- Variants: Diet cola
- Website: www.cricketcola.com

Cricket Natural Beverages are soda made with a green tea base. According to the manufacturer, every bottle contains two cups of green tea, and it is sweetened with cane sugar rather than high-fructose corn syrup. The drink does not contain any phosphoric acid, preservatives, artificial colors or flavors. Although not widely available, the manufactured flavors include cola in both sugar- and Splenda-sweetened varieties, Pomegranate Raspberry, Mandarin Orange, and White Peach. Cricket Natural Beverages was created by John and Mary Heron of Potomac, Maryland.

== Ingredients ==
The ingredients in Cricket Cola include: Kola nut extract, green tea concentrate, vanilla extract, primarily sweetened with cane sugar. The Pomegranate Raspberry, Mandarin, and White Peach are naturally flavored.

== Packaging ==
Cricket is available only in 12 oz retro glass bottles. It available in single bottles, 4-packs or by the case (24 bottles).

== Sale to Meridian ==
In late 2008, Cricket was acquired by Meridian Beverage Company, a Chicago-based healthy beverage company, for an undisclosed amount of Meridian Stock. Co-founder Mary Heron became senior vice president of sales and marketing for Meridian as part of the acquisition.

As of March 2010 Meridian does not list Cricket on their website as one of their product lines. It is unclear through media outlets if the product will be relaunched by Meridian. Since its sale, Cricket has been increasingly difficult to find at Whole Foods Market and Potbelly Sandwich Works, two of Cricket's main retail chains.

== See also ==
- Cola
