= Dan Levitan =

American investment banker and venture capital investor

- Education: Duke University (BA); Harvard University (MBA)
- Occupation: Venture capitalist
- Known for: Co-founder of Maveron
- Spouse: Stacey Rae Winston
- Children: 2

Dan Levitan is a former investment banker turned venture capital investor. He is co-founding partner at Maveron, which invests in consumer-only businesses centered on technology-enabled products and services in commerce, education, and health and wellness.

== Early life ==
Levitan is the son of Minna and Milton Levitan. Levitan is Jewish. He is a graduate of Duke University and Harvard Business School.

== Career ==
After school, Levitan spent 15 years in investment banking focused primarily on consumer businesses. During his banking career, Levitan helped more than 100 companies go public, make strategic acquisitions or monetize the equity value they had created. As a managing director at Schroder Wertheim & Co., including its predecessor companies (“Schroders”), he led the firm’s consumer group and founded its West Coast investment banking division. Levitan met Howard Schultz in 1991, when Starbucks began planning for its IPO.

Since co-founding the firm with Howard Schultz in 1998, Levitan has led many of the firm’s successful investments including Zulily (NASDAQ: ZU), Potbelly (NASDAQ: PBPB), Trupanion (NYSE: TRUP), Capella Education Company (NASDAQ: CPLA), eBay (NASDAQ: EBAY), and Shutterfly (NASDAQ: SFLY). He currently serves on the board of directors of Allbirds, Brewbird, daring foods, Domain Money, Engageli, Landing, Pacaso, Trupanion and Two Chairs.

Levitan has been recognized on the 2014 Forbes Midas List as one of the world's top investors. He has also been named NASDAQ private company director of the year.

== Philanthropy ==
Levitan has acted as a board member to numerous private, public and philanthropic organizations. He currently serves as the Vice Chair of the Board of Trustees of Seattle Children’s Healthcare System and Seattle Children’s Hospital and he also serves on the Investment Advisory Committee for Seattle Children’s which oversees over $2B in AUM. Levitan is also chair of Brothers for Life (formerly Hope for Heroism), a charity dedicated to supporting wounded Israeli Defense Force soldiers.

== Personal life ==
Levitan married Stacey Rae Winston in a Jewish ceremony at the St. Regis Hotel in Manhattan. They have two children together.
