= Sue Crolick =

American art director and graphic designer

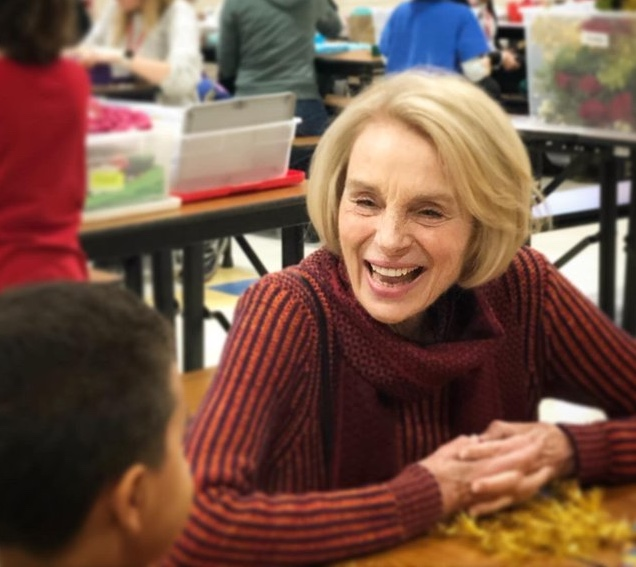
- Sue Crolick at Art Buddies in 2019
- Born: Sue Thacher; 1942 (age 83–84); Summit, New Jersey, USA
- Education: Syracuse University, BFA Advertising Design (1963)
- Occupations: Art director, graphic designer and founder of the nonprofit Art Buddies (formerly Creatives for Causes)
- Years active: 1963-2020
- Known for: First woman art director at several Minnesota advertising agencies and founder of the nonprofit Art Buddies (formerly Creative for Causes)
- Family: Jessica Rolph (daughter)
- Website: artbuddies.org

Sue Crolick (née Thacher; born 1942) is an American art director, graphic designer and founder of the nonprofit Creatives for Causes, now Art Buddies. She is considered to be the first female advertising agency art director in the Minneapolis-Saint Paul market.

During her 30-year creative career, Crolick won the top awards in her industry and a lifetime achievement award from the Advertising Federation of Minnesota. For her work with Art Buddies, she was honored as a Purpose Prize Fellow and transformational leader in social innovation. She received a “50 Over 50” award, which celebrates fifty of Minnesota’s most inspiring and accomplished leaders.

== Early life and education ==
Crolick was born in Summit, New Jersey. Her father was a U.S. naval officer and her family moved numerous times during her childhood. From an early age, she was interested in commercial art and designed posters for school events while in high school. Crolick attended Syracuse University, where she graduated magna cum laude with a BFA in Advertising Design. In 1964, she married George Crolick, who was serving in the U.S. Navy at the time. The couple, now divorced, had one daughter, Jessica Rolph, who was born in 1974.

== Advertising and design career ==
In 1963, Crolick landed her first advertising job with Carmichael Lynch as assistant art director, designer and “girl Friday.” The Minneapolis agency was barely a year old when Crolick became the agency’s only woman on a staff of four. She left for a short stint at Image Art Studio in San Diego. She won a number of awards for her work there as a designer and illustrator, and her illustrations were featured in a book on the history of San Diego. When she returned to the Twin Cities in 1966, Ron Anderson, known as the “godfather of Minneapolis advertising,” offered her a position at Knox Reeves, where she became the agency’s first female art director. Two years later, Crolick moved to Michigan to become the only woman art director at MacManus, John and Adams in Bloomfield Hills. At MacManus, she both wrote and art-directed the concept for Pontiac’s 1968 national ad campaign.

In 1969, Crolick returned to the Twin Cities where, once again, she became the agency’s first female art director, this time at the Twin Cities’ largest agency, Campbell-Mithun. There she worked on accounts that included General Mills, Andersen Windows and Land O’Lakes, and won a number of the agency’s top awards. Three years later Crolick joined Martin Williams Advertising in Minneapolis where she created many more of her award-winning ads for the agency’s clients. After a nine-year run at Martin Williams, Crolick struck out on her own in 1981 to open an office in Minneapolis specializing in advertising and design for creative entrepreneurs.

Crolick is best known for adding an element of visual surprise in her work. Her graphic designs, like her agency ads, communicate quickly with a fun, straight-to-the point message. She offers “graphic design with the directness and humor often found in advertising.” Instead of abstract symbols in her logos and design work, Crolick prefers literal images, “the kind everyone could understand.” To promote artist representative Sandra Heinen, Crolick created an image of a walking drawing table by adding high-heeled shoes to the table legs. In an insurance ad for Ministers Life, she dramatized the difficulty clergy have in making a living by showing a cab driver wearing a clerical collar.

== Creatives for Causes and Art Buddies ==
While serving as Public Service Director on the board for AIGA Minnesota, Crolick came up with the idea for a holiday gift basket project to help the Aliveness Project, a nonprofit for people living with HIV and AIDS. The event was so successful, Crolick decided to engage the creative community to volunteer as youth mentors. The first Art Buddies event was held in 1994, at St. Joseph’s Home for Children. Each AIGA volunteer was paired with a child in need. The volunteers helped the children create a vision of their future self by creating a life-size self-portrait. Based on the success of these events, Crolick was inspired to close her advertising and design business. In December,1994, she founded Creatives for Causes, the nonprofit parent organization for Art Buddies.

Since its founding, Art Buddies has mentored thousands of Twin Cities youths. In programs throughout the year, creative professionals from advertising, design and other creative fields meet weekly with students from high-needs schools. The program “helps kids connect with their imagination, be encouraged to believe in themselves, be inspired to share their ideas, and to learn creative skills and problem solving.”

== Awards and honors ==
Crolick has won numerous design and advertising awards throughout her career, including Gold awards from the New York One Show and the New York Art Directors Club, Awards of Excellence from Communication Arts magazine, and two Best of Shows and a lifetime achievement award from the Advertising Federation of Minnesota. Her work has been recognized in the annuals of Graphis, Print, Communication Arts, The Type Directors Club and the American Institute of Graphic Arts (AIGA). In addition, she was named an AIGA Minnesota Fellow by the Minnesota Chapter of AIGA. Her work has been featured in A Smile in the Mind, Witty Thinking in Graphic Design, and Graphic Design America, which featured the work of twenty-eight leading-edge design firms.

Through her involvement in Creatives for Causes and Art Buddies, Crolick was honored as a Purpose Prize Fellow by California-based Civic Ventures for being a transformational leader in social innovation. In 2004, Creatives for Causes was selected as the best mentoring organization in the Twin Cities by the Mentoring Partnership of Minnesota. In 2018, she received a “50 Over 50” award, which celebrates fifty of the most inspiring and accomplished leaders in Minnesota.

== Speaking and teaching ==
Crolick has been a featured speaker at advertising and design events around the country, including conferences in Seattle, Phoenix, Portland, San Diego, Milwaukee, Sacramento and Miami. She was a keynote speaker at AIGA Minnesota’s annual design conference in 2014. Crolick has also spoken to organizations, including the Minneapolis Star Tribune, Target, IBM Design, Syracuse University and Etsy, a New York-based online marketplace for creative goods.

She has taught and lectured at colleges and universities, including the Minneapolis College of Art and Design, the University of Minnesota Goldstein Museum of Design, the Miami Ad School and the College of Visual Arts. In 1986, she was a visiting professor at Syracuse University.
