= Altimeter Capital =

American investment firm

Altimeter Capital Management, LP
- Company type: Private
- Industry: Investment management
- Founded: 2008; 18 years ago
- Founder: Brad Gerstner
- Headquarters: One International Place, Boston, Massachusetts, U.S.
- Products: Hedge fund; Venture capital
- AUM: US$6.75 billion (September 2024)
- Number of employees: 26 (2024)
- Website: altimeter.com; altimetergrowth.com

Altimeter Capital is an American investment firm based in Boston, Massachusetts and Menlo Park, California. The firm focuses on technology investments in both public and private markets globally.

== Background ==
In 2008, Brad Gerstner founded Altimeter Capital in Boston, Massachusetts. It was launched with less than $3 million from Gerstner's friends and family during the 2008 financial crisis. Prior to that, Gerstner worked at PAR Capital Management as well as General Catalyst.

A month after the launch of Altimeter Capital, an office was opened in Menlo Park, California.

In 2013, Altimeter Capital closed its first venture capital fund at $75 million.

In September 2020, Altimeter Growth Corp was listed on the Nasdaq (Ticker: AGC) raising $450 million. AGC is a SPAC which is a blank-check company. In April 2021 it was announced that AGC would merge with Singapore ridesharing company, Grab to help it list on Nasdaq under the ticker, GRAB.

In January 2021, a second SPAC, Altimeter Growth Corporation 2 was listed on New York Stock Exchange (Ticker: AGCB) raising $450 million. It was terminated early in December 2022 due to its inability to secure a suitable merger deal.

== Business overview ==
For public markets, Altimeter Capital manages a long / short public equity fund that invests in technology companies. The public equity fund is noted for its strong performance, averaging annual returns of 29.52% from 2011 to 2021.

For private markets, Altimeter Capital manages private growth equity funds that invest in both early and later stage technology companies. Its first private fund was closed in 2013.

== Public market investments ==
=== United Continental Holdings ===
In January 2016, Altimeter Capital pressured United Continental Holdings to change its board of directors. Gerstner released a statement stating how investors were disappointed with the poor performance and decision making of the company in recent years. United Continental Holdings eventually gave in and changed its board of directors.

=== Meta Platforms ===
In October 2022, Gerstner on behalf of Altimeter Capital wrote an open letter to Meta Platforms and its CEO, Mark Zuckerberg. In the letter, Gerstner criticized the company stating it had too many employees and was moving too slowly to retain investor confidence. He recommended reducing the headcount expense by 20% and limiting Metaverse investments to $5 billion per year. A few weeks later, Meta laid off over 11,000 employees.

== Venture Capital funds ==
Fund	Vintage Year	Committed Capital ($m)
Altimeter Private Partners Fund I	2013	75
Altimeter Private Partners Fund II	2015	225
Altimeter Private Partners Fund III	2017	200
Altimeter Growth Cascade Fund	2020	100
Altimeter Growth Castle Fund	2020	32
Altimeter Growth Lincoln Fund	2021	60

== Notable venture capital investments ==
- 23andMe
- AppDynamics
- ByteDance
- Cazoo
- Epic Games
- Expedia
- FTX
- GitLab
- Grab
- HubSpot
- Julep
- MongoDB
- Namely
- OfferUp
- Okta
- Pine Labs
- Plaid
- Priceline
- Roblox Corporation
- Snowflake
- SoFi
- StockX
- Twilio
- Uber
- UiPath
- Unity Technologies
- Vroom
