= Earnest (company) =

American student loan company

- Available in: English
- Founded: September 2013; 13 years ago
- Headquarters: San Francisco, California, U.S.
- Creators: Louis Beryl; Ben Hutchinson
- Key people: David Green (CEO); Louis Beryl (Co-Founder & Former CEO); Ben Hutchinson (Co-Founder & Former COO)
- Products: Student loan refinancing, In-school student loans
- Parent: Navient Corp.
- Website: www.earnest.com
- Commercial: Yes
- Launched: March 2014
- Current status: Active

Earnest is a financial technology company headquartered in San Francisco, California, that provides education financing products, including student loan refinancing, and private student loans. The company evaluates applicants using a range of financial and non-financial factors in addition to traditional credit scores.

== History ==
Earnest was co-founded in 2013 by Louis Beryl and Benjamin Hutchinson. Beryl got the idea for the company when he was attending Harvard, and was denied a loan despite his earning potential. He learned that traditional banks took a narrow view of loan applications and felt they were too hard and expensive for many Americans.

Earnest provides private student loans and student loan refinancing products. The company evaluates borrowers using factors such as income, education, and financial history in addition to traditional credit metrics.

The company raised $15 million in seed funding in 2014 from investors including Andreessen Horowitz, First Round Capital, Maveron, Collaborative Fund, and Atlas Venture. Earnest initially launched a personal loan product in Boston, Massachusetts, and formally launched in March 2014. In 2014, Earnest distributed $8 million in loans and by the end of the year had a growth rate of 70%.

On January 27, 2015, Earnest announced $17 million in Series A funding led by Maveron, and launched a student loan refinancing product for undergraduate and graduate borrowers. In November 2015, the company raised $75 million in funding led by Battery Ventures and secured a $200 million warehouse line of credit from New York Life. The funding supported product development and workforce expansion for the company.

In 2016, Earnest was included on the Fast Company World’s 50 Most Innovative Companies list.

In August 2017, the company announced plans to open an office in Salt Lake City, Utah. Later that year in October, Earnest agreed to be acquired by Navient Corp. for $155 million. Navient said the acquisition would enable it to begin originating its own student loans by combining Earnest's technology and underwriting platform with Navient's servicing business. At the time of acquisition, the company was expected to originate $1 billion in student loan refinancing loans in 2017, and continued operating as a separate brand after the deal.

In 2017, Earnest partnered with Credit Karma and TurboTax.

In January 2018, Louis Beryl stepped down from his position as CEO and Susan Ehrlich was appointed.

In April 2019, Earnest launched a private student loan product.

As of 2021, Earnest offered student loan refinancing in 48 U.S. states and the District of Columbia.

In April 2021, Susan Ehrlich announced her retirement and stepped down as CEO to focus on board service. David Green was appointed CEO on April 16, 2021. He previously held several roles at the company, including Chief Operating Officer and Chief Product Officer.

In September 2021, Earnest acquired the financial aid and scholarship platform Going Merry, expanding its services to include "pre-loan" tools for identifying grants. In March 2026 Earnest announced it was shutting down Going Merry.

In early 2023, the company transitioned to a remote-first operating model and reorganized parts of its engineering workforce. As part of this global strategy, the company consolidated its international engineering workforce into a unified nearshore team in Latin America through a partnership with the talent platform Howdy.com. That same year, Earnest partnered with Nova Credit to expand lending services for international students using cross-border credit data.

In July 2025, Earnest Operations LLC reached a $2.5 million settlement with the Massachusetts Attorney General to resolve allegations related to its lending practices. The company denied wrongdoing but agreed to implement changes to its governance processes, including adopting written policies governing its use of AI in lending, enhancing fair lending compliance procedures, discontinuing the use of certain underwriting variables, and providing regular compliance reports to the Attorney General's office. By the end of 2025, Earnest reported a total of $24 billion in refinanced student loans and was included in a list of topfintech companies published by CNBC.
