= Ally Energy =

Networking platform for the energy industry

- Formerly: Pink Petro
- Type: Privately-held company
- Industry: Energy
- Founded: 2014; 12 years ago
- Founder: Katie Mehnert
- Headquarters: Houston, Texas, United States
- Area served: Worldwide
- Key people: Katie Mehnert (CEO)
- Services: social media community, careers in energy, diversity and inclusion
- Parent: Cognovi Communications Inc
- Website: www.allyenergy.com

Ally Energy is an online workforce development company for professionals in the energy industry worldwide. The company was founded in 2014 in Houston, Texas, originally under the name Pink Petro.

The company provides career and networking opportunities through listings of jobs and energy-related events. It also provides industry resources, insights and skills development.

== History ==
Ally Energy was founded by Katie Mehnert, an energy executive with various companies and also with the United States Department of Energy on its Equity and Energy initiative.

She got the idea for Pink Petro in 2013. With support from Cindy Patman, a senior director of diversity and corporate affairs at Halliburton and support from Royal Dutch Shell, she launched an online platform based on cloud enterprise social technology from Jive Software. Then, the CEO of Jive, Elisa Steele created a partnership to launch the community. Former Houston Mayor, Annise Parker proclaimed Pink Petro Day on May 2, 2015, to celebrate with over 300 executives and professionals. with the support of Shell, Halliburton, Jive Software and KPMG.

In March 2016, Pink Petro organized the HERWorld Energy Forum, a daylong conference on energy innovation, technology, policy and workforce. In 2017, the first career site for women in energy, Experience Energy, was launched with the platform hosting approximately 500 jobs. In 2020, Pink Petro and Experience Energy were combined and rebranded to form Ally Energy.

In 2021, Ally Energy acquired Clean Energy Social expanding its diversity equity and inclusion platform to include analytics that can be helpful to hiring managers. As of 2022, Ally Energy has three councils, ALLY, ERG and ESG. ALLY is for executive CHROs and leaders in energy addressing workforce, ERG is about employee resources groups to address culture, and ESG is for climate and sustainability regulatory executives.
