= Julep (company) =

American cosmetics company

Julep Beauty Inc.
- Type: Subsidiary
- Industry: Personal care
- Founded: 2007 in Seattle
- Founder: Jane Park
- Headquarters: New York City
- Area served: United States
- Products: Nail polish, cosmetics, beauty products
- Parent: AS Beauty
- Website: www.julep.com

Julep Beauty, Inc. is a New York based cosmetics company founded in 2007 by Jane Park. The company sells its products online and in its own branded beauty parlors.

== History ==
In 2007 Julep opened four nail parlors in the Seattle area that offered manicures, pedicures, facials, and waxing. Park sold Julep nail care products at the parlors— which was used as a testing ground for Julep product.

Julep moved into e-commerce in 2008. By 2013, Julep products were also available through retailers such as Sephora, and on TV though QVC. Also in 2013, Julep opened its first pop-up store in New York City. Julep reported it had tripled its e-commerce revenue in 2013. In March 2015, Julep announced that they were laying off 8% of their staff.

In December 2018, Julep's parent company, Glansaol, filed for bankruptcy. As a result, Julep announced plans to close their two retail locations, lay-off over 100 employees, and relocate to its parent company's New York office. Glansaol sold to AS Beauty for $18 million.

Julep introduced its monthly subscription service, Julep Maven, in 2011. Subscribers or “Mavens” pay a monthly fee to receive custom boxes of nail polish and makeup. Subscribers may also act as beta-testers in the company's Idea Lab, answering surveys and posting on social media, allowing Julep to see how their products in development are being received. In 2014, Julep's subscription service the company received an "F" rating from the Better Business Bureau. The BBB's David Quinlan said about the 173 total complaints made during that period. Julep responded with a statement blaming the influx of complaints on a surge in business and shipping errors. The program relaunched in 2020.

== Financing ==
In 2013, Julep received funding from venture capital firms Andreessen Horowitz, Maveron, Troy Carter, as well as Precedent Investments, backed by Will Smith and Jada Pinkett Smith, and Jay Z and Beyoncé’s Roc Nation. The following year, Altimeter Capital, Azure Capital Partners and Madrona Venture Group also invested in Julep. By April 2014, Julep had raised $56M in venture capital financing.

== Products ==
Julep designs, produces and sells its own products. The company sold in excess of 200 shades of nail polish, each of which is given a woman's name. It also has a line of makeup and skin care products. These have included both sun screens and moisturizers. In 2014, Julep produced the Plié Wand, an ergonomic nail polishing brush that attaches to the top of nail polish caps. The wand was first tested through a crowdfunding campaign. In 2021 the company released the Julep Beauty's Eyeshadow 101 Crème-to-Powder Eyeshadow Stick, which became the bestseller on Amazon. The company promotes its products as free of fumes and toxins.
