= Navient =

Student debt collection service based in Wilmington, Delaware

Navient Corporation
- Formerly: Sallie Mae
- Type: Public
- Traded as: Nasdaq: NAVI; S&P 600 component
- Industry: Financial services
- Founded: April 30, 2014; 12 years ago
- Headquarters: Herndon, Virginia, U.S.
- Key people: David L. Yowan (president and CEO)
- Revenue: US$2.21 billion (2021)
- Total assets: US$70.795 billion (2022)
- Number of employees: 2,100 (2025)
- Website: navient.com

Navient Corporation is an American financial services company and former student loan servicer based in Herndon, Virginia. The company was formed in 2014 by the split of Sallie Mae into two distinct entities: Sallie Mae Bank and Navient. The company employs 4,500 people at offices across the US. In 2018, Navient serviced a quarter of all student loans in the United States. In 2024, the company was barred from servicing federal student loans.

== History ==
Navient was chartered in 1972 as a Government-Sponsored Enterprise (GSE) called Student Loan Marketing Association (nicknamed Sallie Mae). The company was created by Congress to support the student loan program established by the Higher Education Act of 1965. It was created mainly for two reasons: 1) to purchase student loans in the secondary market; and, 2) to securitize pools of student loans. The objective is to create liquidity for these loans to increase their value to lenders, reducing the costs to borrowers in the process.

Sallie Mae's privatization began in 1997. In 2004, Sallie Mae's GSE charter dissolved and it became a private-sector company with an independent board.

The U.S. Department of Education selected Sallie Mae in 2009 to service federal loans on its behalf.

In 2010, Congress passed the Health Care and Education Reconciliation Act of 2010, which eliminated the federally guaranteed loan program known as Federal Family Education Loan Program (FFELP), under which banks and companies like Sallie Mae made loans to college students backed by a federal guarantee. As a result, effective July 1, 2010, all federal loans were originated directly by the U.S. Department of Education. Currently, there are no existing government-sponsored entities that provide securitization of student loans.

The company announced in 2013 its plans to separate into two publicly traded companies – an education loan management business to be launched with a new name – Navient – and a consumer banking business, which retained the name Sallie Mae. The spin-off was completed on April 30, 2014.

In 2015, Navient attracted recognition from 2020 Women on Boards, the Women's Forum of New York, and the New York Stock Exchange Governance Services for gender diversity on its board of directors.

The company acquired asset recovery and business process outsourcing firm, Gila LLC, and health care payments firm Xtend Healthcare.

On September 28, 2021, Navient announced that it planned to cease servicing federal student loans. It initially asked to offload its responsibilities to another federal loan servicer, Maximus Inc. In October 2021, the Department of Education approved the plan for Navient to transfer outstanding Department of Education owned federal loans and select personnel to Maximus through a newly formed federal loan servicing unit called Aidvantage.

In 2021, student loan borrowers filed a lawsuit against Navient in order to force the company into bankruptcy. In January 2022, a $1.85 billion settlement was announced between student loan borrowers and Navient. On October 17, 2022, the student borrowers won an injunction that barred the company from collecting payments for certain loans that were considered discharged in bankruptcy.

In 2023, a Navient subsidiary Earnest began lending to international students.

In May 2024, Navient agreed to outsource its student loan servicing operations to MOHELA.

In September 2024, Navient was banned from servicing most federal student loans, as well as required to pay $20 million in fines and $100 million in compensation to borrowers, under a proposed settlement with the Consumer Financial Protection Bureau (CFPB).

== Corporate and financial ==
Navient trades on the Nasdaq stock exchange under the ticker symbol NAVI. As of 2015, Navient held the largest portfolio of education loans insurance or guaranteed under the Federal Family Education Loan Program, as well as the largest portfolio of Private Education Loans. Navient funds most of its operation by manufacturing student loan asset-backed securities: bundling loans and selling them to investors as financial instruments. The SLABS are graded by bond-rating agencies such as Moody's Investor Services and Fitch Ratings. The value of SLABS have been reduced as more students choose income-based repayment plans.

As of June 2016, a majority of the SLAB tranches continue to be downgraded.

In 2014, Moody's downgraded Navient's senior unsecured debt and corporate family ratings to Ba3 because of loss of earnings, cash flow, equity, and high leverage.

Jack Remondi is the former CEO of Navient and has written and spoken about recommendations to improve the student loan program.

== Lawsuits, investigations, settlements, and controversies ==
In August 2015, the CFPB, which had been investigating the company for nearly two years, sent Navient a letter telling its executives that the agency's enforcement staff had found enough evidence to indicate the company violated consumer protection laws.

On May 28, 2015, the United States Department of Justice announced that nearly 78,000 military service members would begin receiving $60 million in compensation for being charged excess interest on their student loans by Navient. The company opted for this settlement to resolve the federal government's lawsuit alleging the company's violation of the rights of service members eligible for benefits and protections under the Service Members Civil Relief Act (SCRA).

On March 14, 2016, Senator Elizabeth Warren gave a speech in Congress qualifying Navient's service and subsequent contract award by the Department of Education as "an outrageous fiasco". Warren recommended "a total reform of student loan servicing to make sure that nothing as the Navient disaster ever happens again".

In June 2016, stockholders filed a class action lawsuit against Navient. The plaintiffs included Chicago police officers and retired city employees in Providence, Rhode Island.

On January 18, 2017, the CFPB, along with the Attorneys General of Illinois, Pennsylvania, and Washington, filed a complaint against Navient in the United States District Court for the Middle District of Pennsylvania alleging violations of the Fair Credit Reporting Act and Fair Debt Collection Act. It alleged that Navient "systematically and illegally [failed] borrowers at every stage of repayment" with "abusive interest charges, hurting disabled military veterans by making inaccurate reports to credit companies about them and making repayments harder than necessary." According to the court filing,

- "Navient has failed to perform its core duties in the servicing of student loans, violating Federal consumer financial laws....
- "Navient systematically deterred numerous borrowers from obtaining access to some or all of the benefits and protections associated with these plans [plans limiting repayment based on income]. Despite assuring borrowers that it would help them find the right repayment option for their circumstances, Navient steered these borrowers experiencing financial hardship that was not short-term or temporary into costly payment relief designed for borrowers experiencing short-term financial problems, before or instead of affordable long-term repayment options that were more beneficial to them in light of their financial situation.
- "For borrowers who did enroll in long-term repayment plans, Navient failed to disclose the annual deadline to renew those plans, misrepresented the consequences of non-renewal, and obscured its renewal notice to borrowers who were due for renewal. As a result, the affordable payment amount expired for hundreds of thousands of borrowers, resulting in an immediate increase in their monthly payment and other financial harm.
- "Navient also misreported information to consumer reporting agencies about thousands of borrowers who were totally and permanently disabled, including veterans whose total and permanent disability was connected to their military service, by making it appear as if those borrowers had defaulted on their student loans when they had not, damaging their credit; misrepresented one of its requirements for borrowers to release their cosigner from their private student loan, thereby denying or delaying access to an important feature on many cosigned private loans that relieves a cosigner of responsibility for the loan once the borrower meets certain eligibility criteria; and repeated the same errors in processing federal and private student loan borrowers’ payments month after month, even after borrowers complained to Navient about those errors."

The company released a public statement and fact sheet denying the allegations and calling them politically motivated and harmful to borrowers. The lawsuit was settled in 2024, under a proposed order from the CFPB that barred Navient from servicing federal student loans and that required the company to pay $120 million in fines and compensation to borrowers.

Since at least 2011, up to 2017, "tens of thousands" of complaints were filed against Navient. In 2017, 6,708 federal complaints were filed about the company, in addition to 4,185 private complaints – more than any other student loan lender.

In 2018, it was revealed that Navient had attempted to collect loans from co-signers after a student's accidental death.

Navient was also sued by the American Federation of Teachers (AFT) for allegedly failing to divert teachers into public forgiveness plans.

Former Attorney General of Louisiana Charles C. Foti Jr. and the law firm of Kahn Swick & Foti announced that they had started investigating Navient. The investigation is focusing on whether Navient's officers and/or directors breached their fiduciary duties to Navient's shareholders or otherwise violated state or federal laws.

In 2019, Navient's lending practices were the subject of an episode of Michael Lewis's "Against the Rules" podcast.

In 2021, it was reported that the US Department of Education had ordered Navient to pay $22.3 million in a decades-old scandal involving Navient's former parent company, Sallie Mae. The company was accused of overcharging the US government. In the same year, the company also faced a class action lawsuit filed in New Jersey by stockholders who alleged they were injured by its scheme of steering borrowers into more lucrative forbearance status rather than pointing them toward income-driven repayment plans.

In 2022, Navient entered into a $1.85 billion settlement over accusations that it had misled borrowers into costly repayment plans and predatory loans. The settlement spanned 39 states and the District of Columbia and included $1.7 billion in loan cancellations and $95 million in payouts. As of January 2022, the settlement is pending court approval.

Student Loan Justice has fought Navient by calling for bankruptcy laws to again include student loan debt.

== Subsidiaries ==
- Duncan Solutions
- Earnest
- Municipal Services Bureau (MSB)
- Navient BPO (Business Process Outsourcing)
- Navient Portfolio Management
- Pioneer Credit Recovery, Inc.
- Xtend Healthcare

== See also ==
- FAFSA
- Federal Student Aid
- FFELP
- Sallie Mae
- U.S. Department of Education
- USA Funds
