= Lovevery =

American toy company

- Company type: Private
- Industry: Toys
- Founded: 2015
- Founders: Jessica Rolph; Roderick Morris
- Headquarters: Boise, Idaho, U.S.
- Products: educational toys, books, games
- Website: lovevery.com

Lovevery is an American company based in Boise, Idaho that produces Montessori-inspired toys and play-kit subscription boxes for children. It is a certified B Corporation.

== History ==
Lovevery was founded in 2015 by Jessica Rolph and Roderick Morris.

In 2019, Maveron led a $20 million funding cycle for Lovevery, along with Google Ventures and the Chan Zuckerberg Initiative. In October 2021, Lovevery raised $100 million in new investments, led by TCG. Other investors include Reach Capital, SoGal Ventures, as well as the Collaborative Fund.

== Description ==
Lovevery produces educational toys, books, and games via play-kit subscription boxes "designed to meet the developmental needs and brain development of toddlers and babies." The toys, produced in consultation with child development experts, physical therapists, and cognitive developmental psychologists, follow the Montessori educational model.

The company offers subscription boxes and off-the-shelf toys from birth through age five; age-appropriate play kits are sent to subscribers every two to three months. Play guides with each product suggest play ideas and developmental milestones, and a parenting app also accompanies the subscription. Lovevery's products are made from organic and sustainably-sourced materials.

In 2023, Lovevery launched music play kits and online courses aimed at parents. Course Packs are on-demand web and app-based lessons that guide parents through major transitional childhood moments.

In 2024, the company launched its early childhood development products in Singapore.

In addition to educational toys, the company launched The Reading Skill Set, a line of kits designed to help kids read using phonics, including stage-based book bundles “designed to support emotional learning and cognitive development at each stage.”

== Awards ==
- 2018 — Gold Parents' Choice Award
- 2018 — Listed by Time Magazine as a "Best Invention"
- 2018 and 2020 — Red Dot award
- 2019 — Finalist for the Fast Company designation of Most Innovative Company by Design
- 2021 — Founders received the Ernst & Young Entrepreneur of the Year Award, Utah division
- 2024 — Named one of Fast Company's Most Innovative Companies
