= Brad Gerstner =

American investor and hedge fund manager (born 1971)

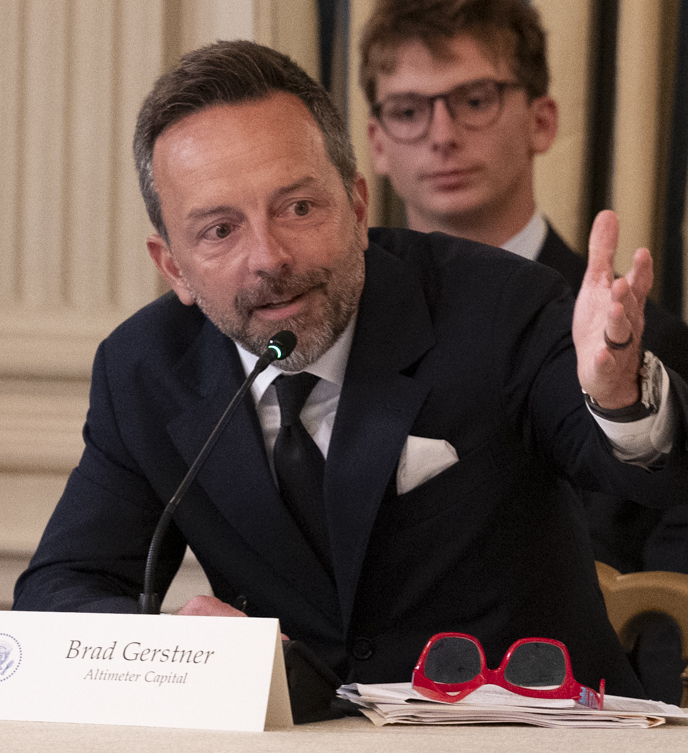
- Gerstner in 2025
- Born: Bradley Thomas Gerstner; May 4, 1971 (age 55); Goshen, Elkhart County, Indiana, U.S.
- Education: Wabash College (BA); Indiana University Maurer School of Law (JD); Harvard Business School (MBA)
- Occupations: Investor, hedge fund manager
- Known for: Founding and leading Altimeter Capital
- Spouse: Michelle Boyers (m. 2007)
- Children: 2

Bradley Thomas Gerstner (born May 4, 1971) is an American entrepreneur, investor, venture capitalist, hedge fund manager, and podcaster. He is the founder, chairman, and CEO of Altimeter Capital. Gerstner appeared on Forbes' 2022 Midas List after his firm's successful investments in Snowflake and Grab. He co-hosts BG2Pod, a bi-weekly podcast on tech, markets, investing, and capitalism, alongside venture capitalist Bill Gurley. In 2025, he founded the Invest America Foundation, which helped advance the Invest America Act—federal legislation that created $1,000 tax-advantaged investment accounts for every child born between 2025 and 2028.

== Early life ==
Gerstner was born on May 4, 1971, in Goshen, a city in Elkhart County, Indiana. His father was Thomas Gerstner and his mother was Martha Burt.

He attended Wabash College from 1989 to 1993 and graduated summa cum laude with a bachelor's degree in Economics and Political Science. He also studied abroad at the University of Oxford from 1991 to 1992.

From 1993 to 1996, Gerstner attended Indiana University Maurer School of Law and obtained a Juris Doctor degree. He did day trading to help pay for his law school fees. After graduation he practiced securities law at Ice Miller LLP and served as Deputy Secretary of State of Indiana.

In 1999, Gerstner returned to school and attended Harvard Business School where he graduated in 2000 with a Master of Business Administration degree. After graduating, he was a founding principal of General Catalyst, worked at several travel startups, and later became a Portfolio Manager for PAR Capital from 2005 to 2008.

== Altimeter Capital ==
In 2008, Gerstner founded Altimeter Capital in Boston, Massachusetts. It was launched with less than $3 million from friends and family during the 2008 financial crisis.

In January 2016, Gerstner and the firm fought with United Continental Holdings to change the company's board of directors. United eventually gave in and changed its board.

In October 2022, Gerstner wrote an open letter to Meta Platforms CEO Mark Zuckerberg, urging the company to cut staff and reduce spending on the metaverse. A few weeks later, Meta laid off over 11,000 employees.

In late 2022, Gerstner and Altimeter bought Nvidia shares despite bearish forecasts, later expanding their position in early 2023 after ChatGPT debuted. Gerstner predicted an “AI supercycle.”

== Personal life ==
Gerstner married Michelle Boyers in 2007 at Martha's Vineyard. They met at Harvard Business School. Gerstner is also an amateur pilot.
