= Spyce Kitchen =

Boston-based robotic-powered restaurant engineered by MIT grads

Spyce

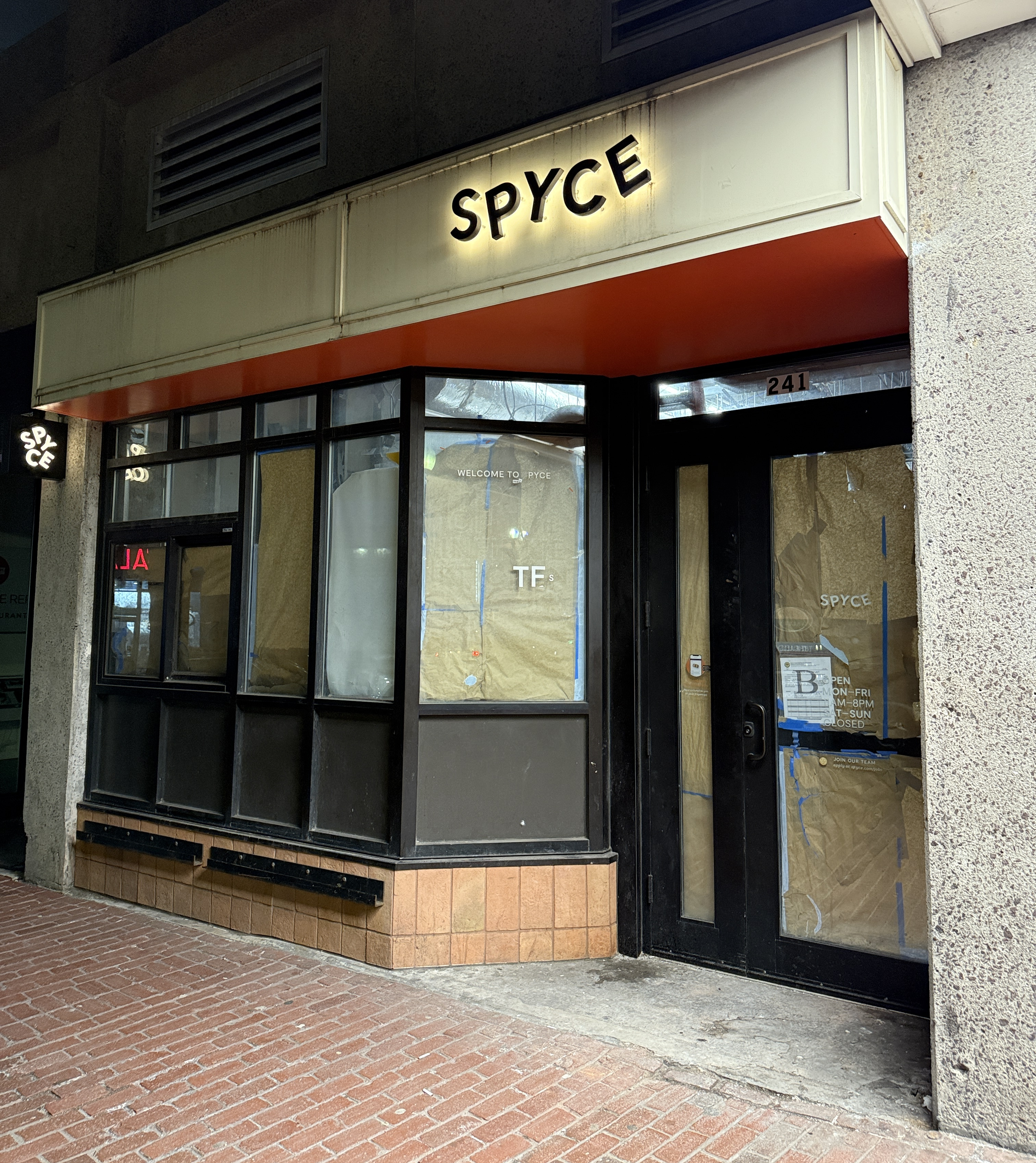
- The former Spyce restaurant in downtown Boston
- Interactive map of Spyce

Restaurant information
- Owner: Wonder
- Previous owner: Sweetgreen
- Head chef: Daniel Boulud
- Location: 241 Washington Street, Boston, Suffolk, Massachusetts, 02201
- Coordinates: 42.3579°N 71.0581°W
- Website: www.spyce.com

Spyce Kitchen or just Spyce was a robotic-powered restaurant which prepares food in "three minutes or less". The restaurant was developed by graduates of the MIT who wanted to make healthy meals more affordable. It was acquired by Sweetgreen and later sold to Wonder.

== History ==
MIT mechanical engineering graduates Michael Farid, Brady Knight, Luke Schlueter and Kale Rogers developed the kitchen using seven autonomous work stations to prepare bowl-based meals using healthy ingredients such as kale, beans and grains. The four graduates wanted to make healthy meals more affordable, so they built the robotic technology and initially served the food to students at an MIT dining hall. The group received the $10,000 "Eat It" Lemelson-MIT undergraduate prize in 2016 as one of America's top two collegiate inventors in food technology.

The four then teamed up with chef Daniel Boulud to create the new menu for their restaurant. Prices started at $7.50 for an entire meal in a bowl at their first real branch, which opened on May 3, 2018, in Boston, Massachusetts. Referred to as the "Spyce Boys", the four founders were inspired by their experiences as hungry student athletes on tight budgets. Spyce Kitchen automated cooking units also clean up after cooking and dirtying the cooking apparatus.

== Funding ==
Spyce raised $21 million in series A funding in September 2018, led by venture capital firms Maveron, Collaborative Fund, and Khosla Ventures.

== Restaurants ==
Spyce operated and then shuttered two restaurants in the Greater Boston area. Their first restaurant was located at 241 Washington St in downtown Boston. Their second restaurant, which opened in February 2021, was located at 1 Brattle Square, in Harvard Square.

== Acquisition by Sweetgreen and closure ==
In 2021, the company was acquired by Sweetgreen, a chain of salad restaurants.

Both Spyce restaurants were closed following the Sweetgreen acquisition, "to focus on developing technology for Sweetgreen restaurants". The downtown Boston location closed October 22, 2021, and the Harvard Square location closed February 18, 2022.

== Sale to Wonder ==
In November 2025 it was announced that Sweetgreen would be selling Spyce to Wonder for $186.4 million. The deal allows Sweetgreen to continue to utilize Infinite Kitchen technology at their locations.
