= Maveron =

American venture capital firm

- Type: Private
- Industry: Venture capital
- Founded: 1998; 28 years ago
- Founder: Dan Levitan; Howard Schultz
- Key people: Dan Levitan; Jason Stoffer; Anarghya Vardhana; David Wu
- AUM: US $1.3 billion (2020)
- Website: www.maveron.com

Maveron is an American venture capital firm that invests in consumer-only and early-stage companies, with offices in Seattle, Washington and San Francisco, California. The firm was co-founded by Dan Levitan and former Starbucks chief executive Howard Schultz in 1998.

Maveron invests in consumer-only businesses centered on technology-enabled products and services in commerce, education, and health and wellness. As of 2020, the firm had a total of $1.3 billion in assets under management (AUM).

== History ==
The firm was co-founded in Seattle by Dan Levitan, former investment banker at Schroder Wertheim & Co., and Howard Schultz, former CEO, president, and chairman of Starbucks. During his time at Schroder Wertheim & Co., Levitan helped take Starbucks public in 1992, which is where his relationship with Schultz was formed. By 1993, Levitan and Schultz began investing together in several consumer businesses. In 1997, Levitan decided to leave New York and head west to Seattle to start Maveron with Schultz. The firm opened its doors in January 1998. Maveron's name is a combination of "maverick" and "vision". During the early 2000s, the fund and Schultz in particular, was criticized for investments in for-profit universities, namely Capella University. Maveron opened its San Francisco office in 2009. Maveron's early investment in zulily led to November 2013 public offering of 22% of shares (for $4.5 million) worth over a billion dollars by December. In 2014, the fund was featured on Forbes' top venture capital firms in the U.S., ranked #54 out of 100. In 2019, the fund raised an additional $180 million to finance investments. The firm often turns down surplus capital in order to ensure consistent investment delta (margin by which fund outperforms the stock market).

== Portfolio ==
Maveron's early investments include eBay, Drugstore.com, and Potbelly Sandwich Works.

Active Maveron companies include Allbirds, AllStripes, Bookclub, BrewBird, Booster Fuels, CapHill Brands, Common, Co-Star, Daring, DollsKill, Dolly, Eargo (NASDAQ: EAR), Engageli, Everlane, Flywire (NASDAQ: FLYW), Gallant, Illumix, Imperfect Foods, Inkbox, Landing, Lovevery, Modern Fertility, Nécessaire, Otis, Pacaso, Parade, Peach, Pluto VR, Pro.com, Spyce, Tempest, The Guild, The Wrap, Thirty Madison, Two Chairs, and Wave.

Exits include August Lock, Capella Education, CircleUp, CourseHero, Cranium, Darby Smart, Decide, Earnest, General Assembly, Good, Groupon, Julep, Koru, Lucy Activewear, Madison Reed, Newsle, NextFoods, PayNearMe, Periscope, Pinkberry, Quellos Group, SeatMe, Shutterfly, Trupanion, and zulily.

== See also ==
- List of venture capital firms
- List of companies based in Seattle
