= Shazi Visram =

American businessperson

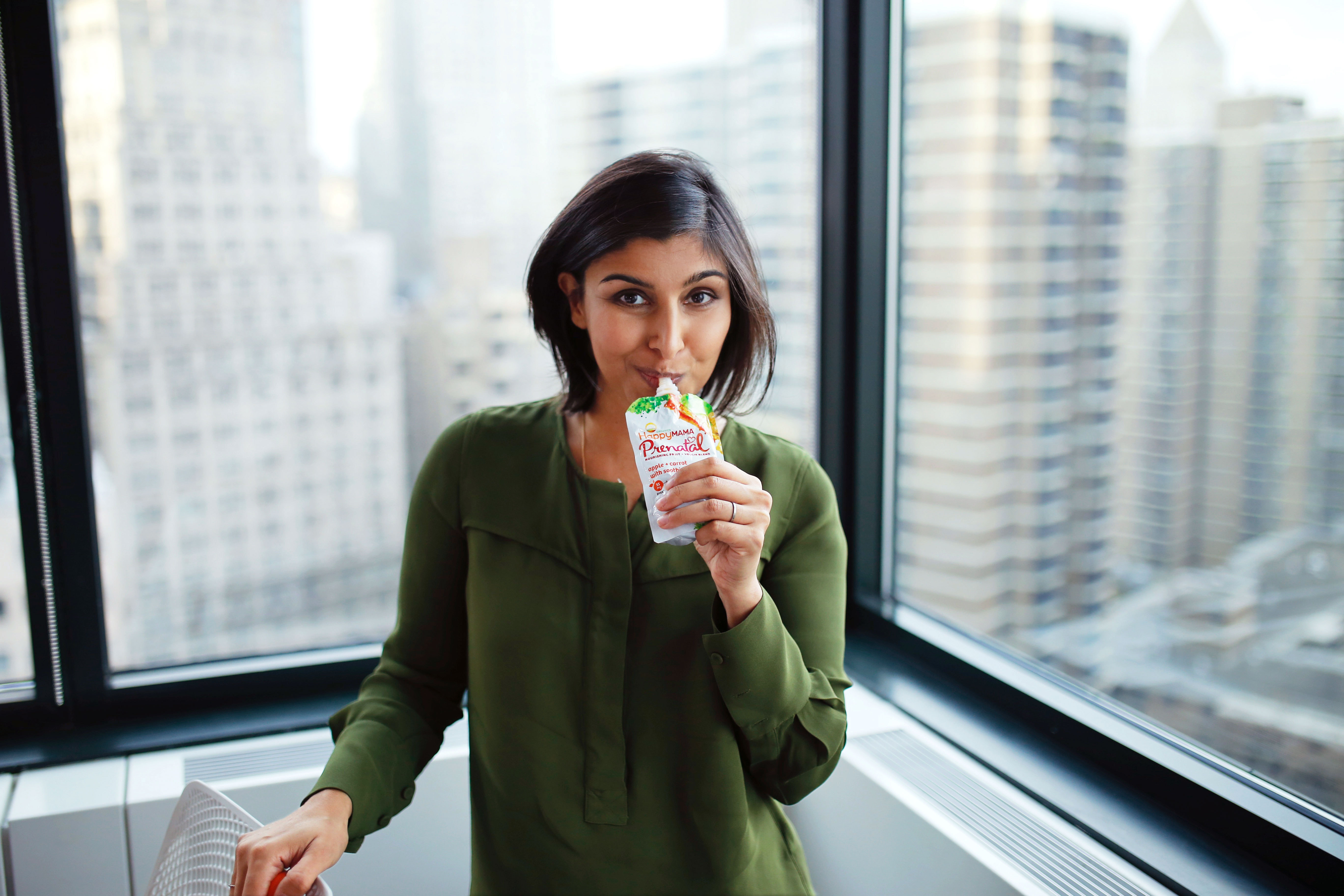
- Born: Toronto
- Education: Columbia University (BA, MBA)
- Occupations: Entrepreneur, investor, philanthropist
- Known for: Happy Family

Shazi Visram is an American entrepreneur, investor, and philanthropist, best known as the founder, CEO, and Chief Mom of Happy Family Brands.

== Early life and education ==
Visram was born in Toronto to immigrants from Pakistan and Tanzania. At the age of three, she moved with her parents and brother to Birmingham, Alabama, where they lived in a room at the motel the family operated. Visram says that owning their own business was her parents’ biggest source of both stress and pride. She credits her entrepreneurial parents for their example.

Visram graduated from Indian Springs School in Indian Springs, AL before attending Columbia University, where she received her BA in History and Visual Arts in 1999, and later her MBA from Columbia Business School (‘04) in Management and Entrepreneurship.

== Career ==
=== Founding Happy Family ===
While attending Columbia Business School, Visram began writing her business plan for Happy Family after chatting with a friend, who admitted to feeling guilty about not being able to make homemade food for her babies.

After a brief round of investment from family and friends—the first person to write a check to the company was Visram's mother, Zarin—Visram raised $23 million from 186 individual investors from 2004 to 2012, including Honest Tea CEO Seth Goldman, chef Tom Colicchio, and actress Demi Moore.

=== 2006–2013: Growth, initiatives, and sale to Danone ===
In 2006, Visram, along with Founding Partner and COO Jessica Rolph, formally launched Happy Family, known at the time as Happy Baby. In May 2013, Visram sold 92% of the company to Groupe Danone, noting "the broader opportunity we weren't able to tap into" provided by Danone to bring more than 100 products to market in 34 countries. Following the sale, Visram remained CEO until December 2017.

== Recognition ==
- An Inc. 500 Fastest Growing Company
- Rockstar of the New Economy (Fast Company, 2012)
- Innovator of the Year (Stevie Awards, 2016)
- Distinguished Early Achievement Award (Columbia Business School, 2016)
- 20 Most Influential Moms of the Year (FamilyCircle, 2017)
- University Medal for Excellence (Columbia University, 2018)
