= Jessica Rolph =

American entrepreneur and businesswoman

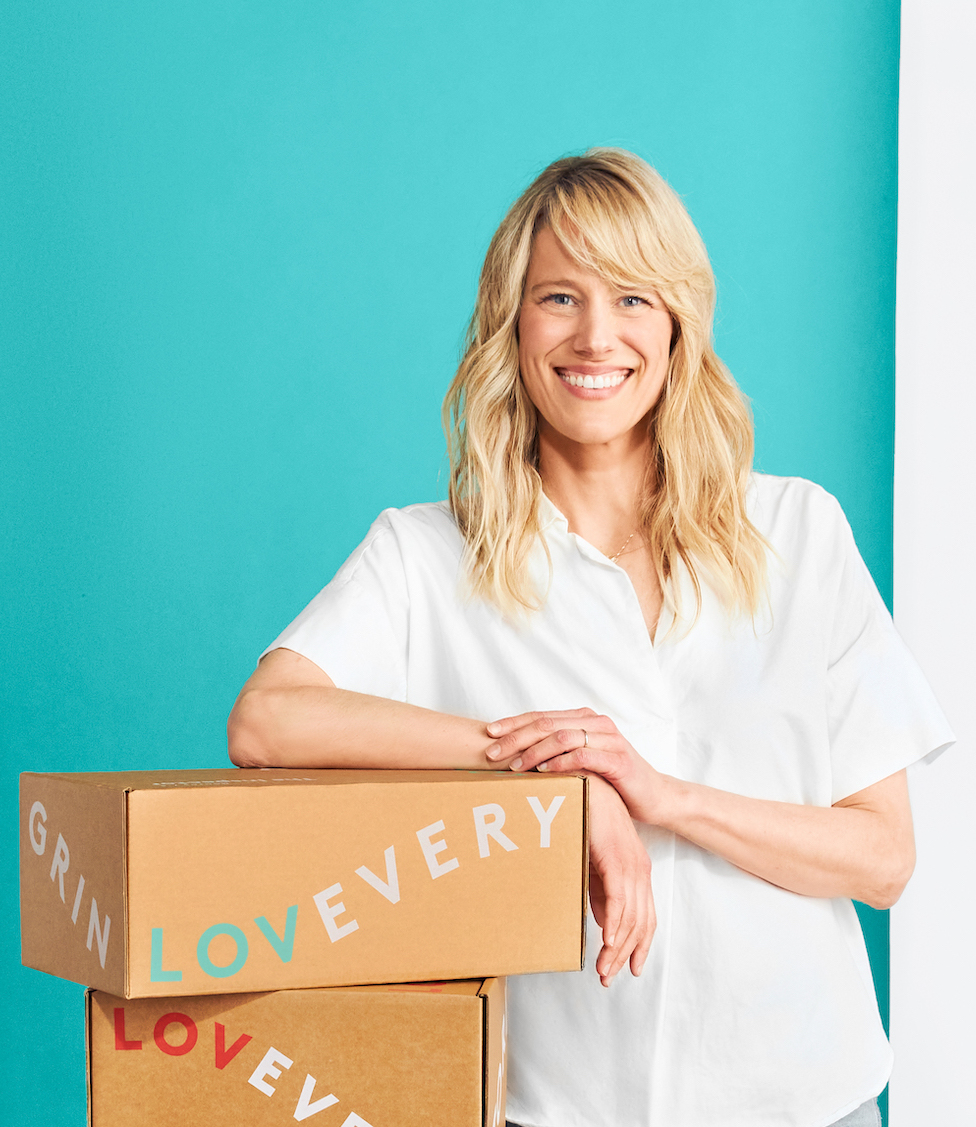
- Born: Jessica Alleman Thacher Crolick; 1974 (age 51–52); Hennepin, Minnesota
- Education: B.A., Cornell University; M.A., Samuel Curtis Johnson Graduate School of Management, Cornell
- Occupations: Entrepreneur; Businesswoman
- Title: CEO, Lovevery former COO, Happy family
- Children: 3

Jessica Rolph (born 1974) is an American entrepreneur and businesswoman. She is the CEO and co-founder of Lovevery, co-founder and former chief operating officer of Happy Family, and co-founder of the Climate Collaborative.

== Early life and education ==
Rolph was born in 1974 in Minneapolis, the daughter of George Crolick and Sue (née Thatcher) Crolick. She lives in Boise, Idaho with her husband Decker and their three children.

Rolph earned a 1997 B.A. in anthropology at Cornell University and 2004 M.B.A. cum laude from the university's Samuel Curtis Johnson Graduate School of Management.

== Career ==
In 2005, with Shazi Visram, Rolph was a founding partner of Happy Family, the leading organic baby food brand, and she served as its chief operating officer. Happy Family was ranked the 68th-fastest-growing private company in America on the "Inc. 500" in 2011. The Kellogg Foundation made a $4.6 million investment in the company in 2012. The Danone Group purchased Happy Family from Visram and Rolph in 2013, with the Financial Times estimating its value at between $250 million and $300 million.

Rolph co-founded Lovevery in 2015 with Roderick Morris, focusing on age appropriate, educational developmental toys and play kits, with the first product released in 2017. The products are based on Rolph's initial research into infant brain development, the toys she made on her own, and input from child development experts. In 2021, the company raised $100M in Series C funding and announced their expansion with the launch of the Lovevery mobile app.

At both companies, Rolph has focused on sustainability, environmentalism, inclusion and equal access.

== Climate Collaborative ==
Rolph co-founded the Climate Collaborative, launched in March 2017, in partnership with Lara Dickinson, Nancy Hirshberg (sister of Gary Hirshberg), and Katherine DiMatteo of the Sustainable Food Trade Association (SFTA). Stonyfield, Numi Organic Tea, Happy Family, Nature's Path Foods and other companies have joined the Collaborative's environmental efforts.

== Awards and honors ==
Rolph is a Park Leadership Fellow alumna, and a 2013 Henry Crown Aspen Institute Fellow, as well as a member of the Aspen Global Leadership Network.

In 2020, Rolph was listed as one of Entrepreneur magazine's 100 Powerful Women. She and Morris were awarded Ernst & Young Entrepreneur of the Year in the Utah division in 2021. Rolph was named Cornell Entrepreneur of the Year in 2021, given to "a Cornellian who exemplifies entrepreneurial achievement, community service and high ethical standards." She was also listed in 2021 as one of Inc.'s 100 Female Founders.
