= Howdy.com =

U.S. tech staffing company

- Company type: Private
- Industry: Technology staffing
- Founded: 2018; 8 years ago in Austin, Texas, U.S.
- Founder: Jacqueline Samira; Frank Licea
- Headquarters: Austin, Texas, United States
- Key people: Jacqueline Samira (CEO); Frank Licea (CTO)
- Website: www.howdy.com

Howdy.com is an American technology staffing company headquartered in Austin, Texas. Founded in 2018 by Jacqueline Samira and Frank Licea, it specializes in nearshoring, connecting software engineers in Latin America with companies in the United States, focusing on full-time, remote roles in compatible time zones.

== Overview ==
The company provides recruitment, payroll, benefits, equipment, and compliance services for its clients' hires. In 2023, the company acquired Brazilian tech recruitment platform GeekHunter. It participated in Y Combinator's Winter 2021 startup accelerator program. Howdy was included in the Inc. 5000 list of fastest-growing private companies in 2023 and 2024, and was included in Forbes's list of "America's Best Startup Employers" in 2024.

== History ==
The company was founded as Austin Software in 2018 by Jacqueline Samira and Frank Licea. Its mission was to address the U.S. tech talent shortage by recruiting engineers from Latin American countries like Colombia, Chile, and Mexico. The company was selected for Y Combinator's Winter 2021 startup accelerator program.

The company launched from stealth mode in August 2022 under the name Astro and later rebranded to Howdy.com to better reflect its company culture and expanding mission.

The company received Series A funding in 2022 and an extension in 2023 to support growth. In August 2023, it expanded in Latin America by acquiring GeekHunter, a Brazilian tech recruitment platform with nearly 400,000 registered users.

The company appeared on the Inc. 5000 list of fastest-growing private companies in 2023 and 2024 and was included on Forbes' list of "America's Best Startup Employer" in 2024. The Austin Business Journal ranked it among the fastest-growing private companies in Central Texas in 2023.

== Services ==
The company provides nearshoring services by recruiting and vetting software developers in Latin America and matching them with U.S.-based employers. In addition to recruitment, Howdy handles payroll, benefits, equipment, and legal compliance for its clients' hires. Developers work remotely from their home countries, and the company maintains regional offices and coworking spaces in several Latin American cities.

== Funding ==
As of 2023, Howdy had raised a total of $21 million.

- Series A (Aug 2022): The company raised an initial $13 million
- Series A Extension: Howdy raised an additional $5 million in an extension round led by Obvious Ventures, with participation from Greycroft. This round brought the company's valuation to $105 million.
