= CircleUp =

American financial technology company

- Type: Private
- Industry: Financial technology
- Founded: 2011; 15 years ago
- Founders: Ryan Caldbeck, CEO; Rory Eakin, COO
- Headquarters: San Francisco, California
- Number of employees: 55 (2017)
- Website: circleup.com

CircleUp is a financial technology company based in San Francisco that focuses on consumer goods startups. Since its official launch in April 2012, CircleUp has helped several consumer companies raise equity, including Back to the Roots, Halo Top Creamery, Little Duck Organics, Rhythm Superfoods and others. General Mills has an investment fund that is partnered with CircleUp to invest in companies listed on the platform.

== History ==
CircleUp was founded in 2011 by ex-private equity professionals Ryan Caldbeck and Rory Eakin. Prior to launch, CircleUp raised $1.5 million from investors such as Clayton Christensen, David Topper (ex-head of Equity Capital Markets at JP Morgan) and Maveron (a venture capital firm founded by Howard Schultz). The company officially launched in 2012 as a platform for entrepreneurs to raise capital and for investors to find companies to fund that were not part of the tech industry. Only original shares of the company are sold through the CircleUp platform. On the site, entrepreneurs can connect with investors and investors are able to find investment opportunities as well as diligence materials such as investor presentations, financials, product details, industry information and third-party data. CircleUp partnered with SecondMarket to cross-list companies seeking investments. In 2014, CircleUp raised $14 million in a financing round led by Canaan Partners and including previous investors Google Ventures and Union Square Ventures.

In 2015, CircleUp raised a $22 million fund, the CircleUp Growth Fund, which would match investments coming through its platform. On November 11, 2015, the company announced its Series C funding round of $30 million led by Collaborative Fund.

In 2016, CircleUp ran a closed trial of its Marketplace Index Fund, designed to give larger investors access to a portfolio of consumer products companies, which were identified through the company's classifier software, which was later named Helio.

CircleUp Credit Advisors was announced in July 2017 as an online lender for companies seeking credit with favorable investment data. Community Investment Manager partnered with CircleUp to provide a $20 million credit facility.

In October 2017, the company launched a $125 million investment fund, CircleUp Growth Partners, dedicated to early-stage consumer companies. The fund uses CircleUp's Helio software. CircleUp joined the Nielsen Connected Partner program in December 2017. The partnership allows CircleUp to use Nielsen data for its Helio software.

On December 11, 2018, it was reported that CircleUp's founder and CEO Ryan Caldbeck was "talking about building a systematic fund in the private markets."

== Helio ==
The Helio software, originally referred to as The Classifier, analyzes public and private company data from public records, partnerships and information the company has acquired to identify potential investments. It identifies brands which make between $1 million and $15 million in revenue as signs that they are likely to breakout. It creates analyses with classifications such as reach of distribution, product quality, brand strength, information on the management team as well as company financials which is then reviewed by a team of analysts.

== CircleUp Credit Advisors ==
CircleUp Credit Advisors was established to extend lines of credit to companies in need of additional working capital or small amounts of capital needed for company growth. As the loans are repaid, CircleUp can fund additional companies. At the time that CircleUp Credit Advisors launched, it had initially issued 50 loans to companies identified by the Helio software.

== CircleUp Growth Partners ==
CircleUp Growth Partners was launched in 2017 as a $125 million fund designed to invest in startup consumer product companies. Initial investments included HUM Nutrition and, 4505 Chicharrones. The fund was backed by Temasek Holdings, former BlackRock executive Ken Kroner, co-founder of Bumble and Bumble hair care Tevya Finger, former Annie's Homegrown CEO John Foraker, founder of Plum Organics Gigi Lee Chang and Euclidean Capital.

== Marketplace Index Fund ==
The Marketplace Index Fund is CircleUp's version of an ETF for early-stage private markets. The fund has a minimum $25,000 investment.
