= Elisa Steele =

Former business executive

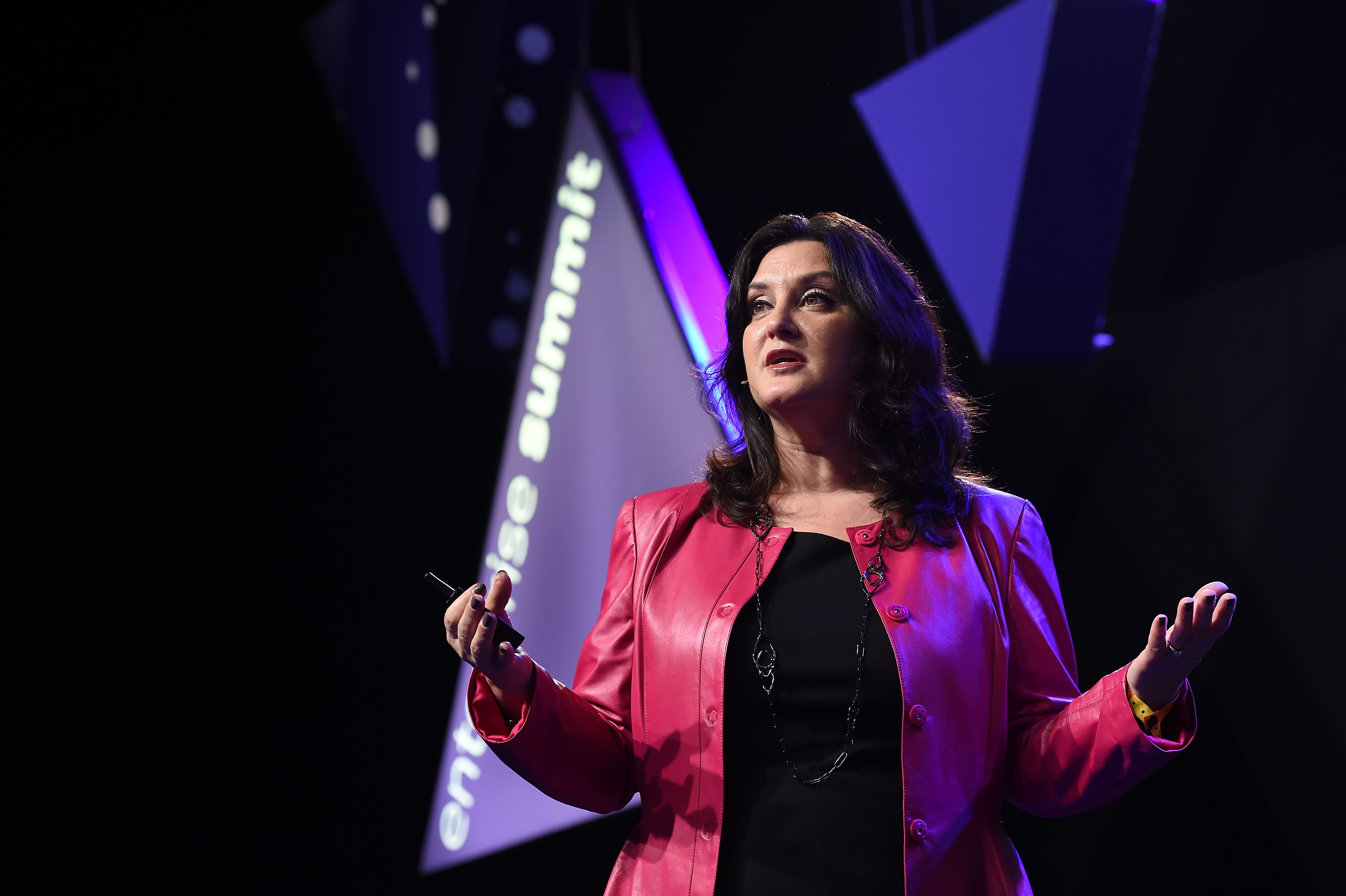
- Steele at Web Summit in 2015
- Occupation: Co-Chair at Cornerstone

Elisa Steele is the former chief executive officer at Namely. Prior to being appointed to the role in August 2018, Steele sat on the company’s board of directors.

== Career ==
Steele grew up in Andover, Massachusetts, and moved to California in 1988. She attended the University of New Hampshire and then went to graduate school at San Francisco State University. After graduating with her MBA, she worked for AT&T Business Services in enterprise sales before joining NetApp as senior vice president of corporate marketing. In 2009, she became the chief marketing officer (CMO) for Yahoo!. She went on to serve as CMO of Skype and CMO & VP-Consumer Apps at Microsoft.

In 2013, while at Microsoft, Steele was contacted by Jive Software and asked to join their board of directors. She left Microsoft and joined Jive as the CMO and vice-president of strategy in early 2014. At the end of the year, she was promoted to president. In 2015, she was appointed CEO.

In 2017, Steele was named to the board of directors for Namely, a human resources platform. In 2018, she was appointed the CEO of Namely. She was also appointed Chairwoman of the Board of Cornerstone OnDemand. In June 2020, the founder and former CEO of Cornerstone, Adam Miller, joined Steele as the co-chair of the Board. In 2020, Bumble announced Steele to its new board of directors. She is also on the board of Splunk and JFrog.
