= Eargo =

American hearing aid manufacturer

Eargo, Inc.
- Company type: Private
- Traded as: Nasdaq: EAR (2020-24)
- Founded: 2010; 16 years ago
- Founders: Florent Michel (inventor); Raphael Michel; Daniel Shen
- Fate: Merged with Hearx to form LXE Hearing
- Headquarters: San Jose, California, U.S.
- Area served: United States
- Products: Hearing aids
- Revenue: ▲$45 million (as of 2020)
- Number of employees: 184 (2020)
- Website: www.eargo.com

Eargo, Inc. is an American hearing aid manufacturer based in San Jose, California. In 2025, Eargo merged with Hearx to form an over-the-counter hearing aid company named LXE Hearing.

== History ==
Eargo was founded in 2010 by Florent Michel, his son Raphael Michel, and Daniel Shen. Florent was an ear, nose, and throat surgeon serving as the designer and inventor. Raphael served as the company's first CEO and Shen the company's chief science & clinical officer.

In 2013, the company received seed funding from various a range of funds and angels, including Maveron. In June 2015, they received $13.6 million in Series A funding from a group of 9 investors, including Maveron, Crosslink Capital, Dolby Family Ventures, and Birchmere Ventures.

Eargo announced $25 million in Series B funding led by New Enterprise Associates in December 2015, and in October 2017 closed the first tranche of Series C funding intended to raise $45m. There were other subsequent rounds of funding including a $52M series-D in 2019 and a $71M series-E in mid 2020.

Christian Gormsen was named CEO in the summer of 2016 and served until June 2023, when William Brownie replaced him.

Eargo filed for an IPO on September 25, 2020, and was officially listed on NASDAQ on October 16, 2020. In 2022, Patient Square Capital, a healthcare investment firm, became the majority owner of Eargo. The company was taken private by Patient Square Capital in January 2024, and its stock was delisted from NASDAQ.

That same year, in April, Eargo agreed to a $34.37 million settlement with the U.S. Department of Justice for allegedly submitting, “claims for hearing aid devices for reimbursement to the Federal Employees Health Benefits Program (FEHBP) that contained unsupported hearing loss diagnosis codes.” Eargo denied the allegations.

In April 2025, Eargo merged with Hearx to create LXE Hearing, an over-the-counter hearing aid company. Nic Klopper, CEO of Hearx, will serve as CEO of the merged company and William Brownie will serve as COO. Nic Klopper, CEO of Hearx, will serve as CEO of the merged company and William Brownie will serve as COO.

== Products ==
Eargo hearing aids are certified Class 2 medical devices. Their design is modeled after the standard fishing fly, with a small speaker surrounded by medical-grade silicone fibers (for which the company uses the trademark Flexi Fibers); the fibers allow natural bass sounds to flow more freely into the ear canal, so that only treble ranges require amplification.

The devices come in two sizes and are pre-programmed with four standard profiles. To change the setting, wearers double-tap their ear, and an acoustic switch changes the sound profile. The settings for the devices in each ear can be changed independently. Users can also send their personal audiograms to licensed hearing professionals at Eargo who will custom-calibrate the device for that individual's specific needs. The hearing aids can be charged using a portable charging device that is sold with them, and are designed to hold a charge for up to 16 hours. The charging device itself is designed to last up to a week on a single charge.

In June 2015, Eargo launched the first hearing devices available for order. The Eargo Plus was introduced in 2017, and, in 2018, the Eargo Max was introduced. The Eargo Neo was launched in 2019, and in 2020, the Eargo Neo HiFi was launched.
