= Little White Duck =

Little White Duck may refer to:

- Little White Duck: A Childhood in China, a 2012 graphic novel by Na Liu and Andrés Vera Martinez
- "The Little White Duck", a song from the 1959 album Burl Ives Sings Little White Duck and Other Children's Favorites

== See also ==
- The Big Goose and the Little White Duck, a 1938 book by Meindert DeJong
- Little Duck (disambiguation)
