= Little Duck Organics =

American baby food company

- Company type: Private
- Industry: Organic food
- Founded: 2009
- Founder: Zak Normandin
- Headquarters: New York, NY, United States
- Area served: Worldwide
- Website: littleduckorganics.com

Little Duck Organics is a US based privately held company, that produces certified baby and toddler organic food, sold in 10,000 groceries and retail stores. Founded in 2009 by Zak Normandin, Little Duck Organics has manufacturing location facilities in the United States and sales in more than 30 countries. The company is focused on speciality baby food and won the Most Innovative Award from Natural Products Expo West 2013.

== History ==
Little Duck Organics was started by Zak Normandin in 2009, who was inspired to start his food company due to lack of wholesome, nutritious products available in the local market for his children. It raised angel funding of $890,000 from equity based crowdfunding platform CircleUp.com and 24 angel investors. Tom First, founder of Nantucket Nectars, was one of the first investors who helped them in raising Series A funding round of $400,000 in 2011. The company launched its products for toddlers and kids that were bite-sized, sugar-free snacks made from pure organic fruit aged 6 months or more. Within 3 months of launch, the products became popular and appealed to parents who were concerned about chemicals and sugar in baby food. The products were soon sold in all major supermarkets including Whole Foods Market, Buy Buy Baby, Stop & Shop Supermarket Co, Toys “R” Us Inc. & Babies “R” Us and others. Later company introduced eco-friendly Plantable Packaging in their new product range of Mighty Oats instant cereals, made from ancient grains. Little Duck Organics is a member of 1% for Humanity.

On December 5, 2013 Little Duck Organics raised Series B funding of $4 million backed by Burch Creative Capital to expand its line of healthy snacks for kids.

== Products ==
Little Duck Organics Product line consists of seven SKUs including snacks, fruits and oats for babies older than six months. All of its products are non-gmo verified, USDA certified, 100% organic, kosher and gluten-free. In 2014, Little Ducks Organics partnered with UFP Technologies for implementing the eco-friendly Plantable Packaging which is 100% recycled and 100% recyclable in their new product line, Mighty Oats instant cereals.

== Awards and recognition ==
- 2011: At Expo East Little Duck Organics was awarded the Best Trade Show Booth.
- 2011: Best Packaging at Expo East
- 2013: The company received the Most Innovative award at Natural Products Expo West.
- 2013: New Arrival Award - Best new Products of 2013, Mighty Oats
- 2014: It received a silver medal for 2014 National Parenting Publications Awards (NAPPA)
