= Sweetgreen =

American fast casual restaurant chain

Sweetgreen, Inc.
- Type: Public
- Traded as: NYSE: SG (Class A); Russell 2000 component
- Industry: Restaurants
- Genre: Fast casual
- Founded: November 2006; 19 years ago in Washington, D.C.
- Founders: Nicolas Jammet; Nathaniel Ru; Jonathan Neman
- Headquarters: Los Angeles, California, U.S.
- Number of locations: 246 (2024)
- Area served: California, Colorado, Connecticut, DC, Florida, Illinois, Indiana, Georgia, Maryland, Massachusetts, Michigan, Minnesota, New Jersey, New York, Pennsylvania, Rhode Island, Texas, Virginia, Wisconsin, Washington
- Products: Salads
- Revenue: ▲US$677 million (2024)
- Operating income: ▲US$−96 million (2024)
- Net income: ▲US$−90 million (2024)
- Total assets: ▲US$857 million (2024)
- Total equity: ▼US$446 million (2024)
- Number of employees: 6,186 (2024)
- Website: sweetgreen.com

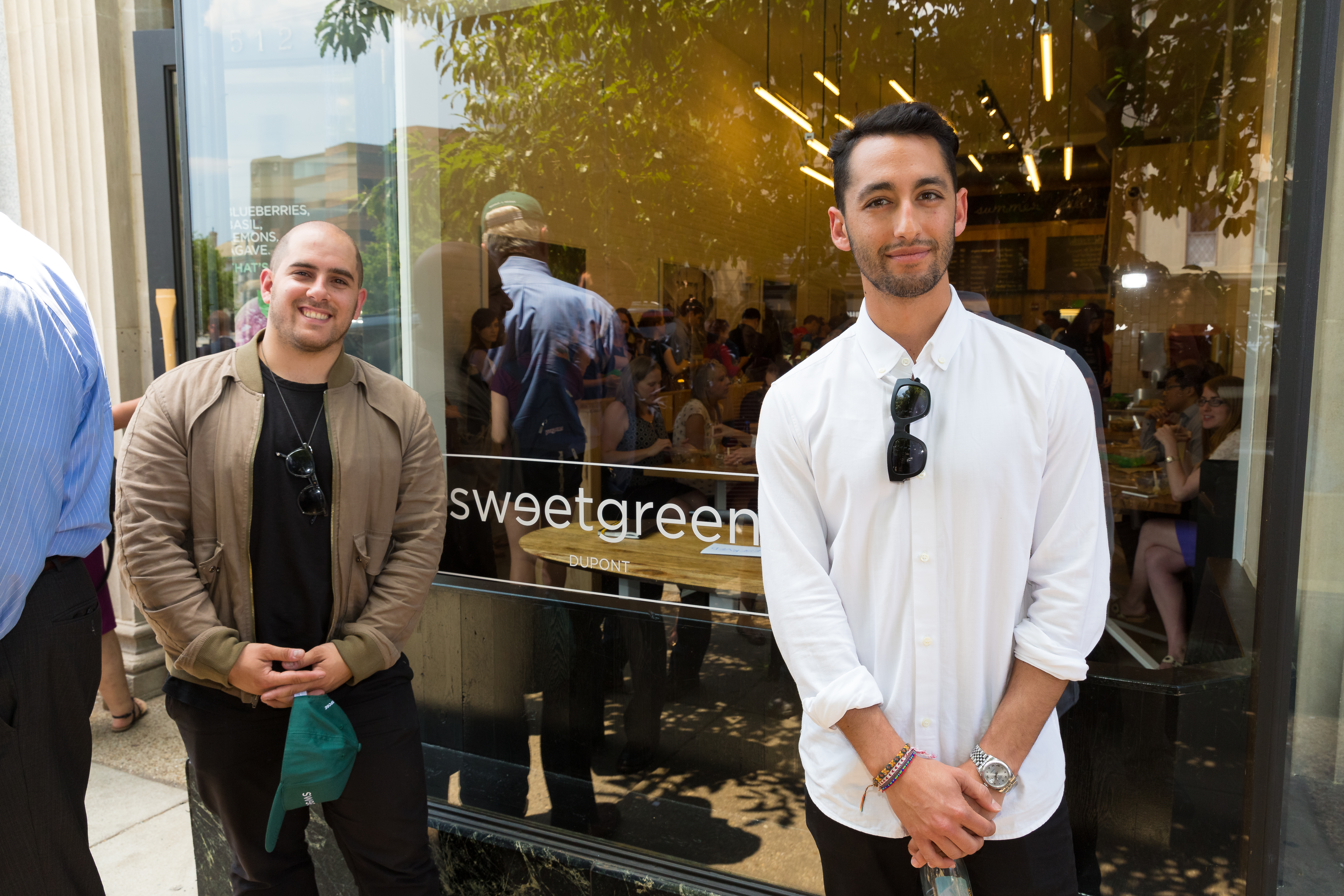
Nicolas Jammet and Jonathan Neman in front of their Dupont Circle Sweetgreen restaurant in Washington, D.C., 2014

Sweetgreen (legally Sweetgreen, Inc., stylized as sweetgreen, previously swɘetgreen) is an American fast casual restaurant chain that serves salads and grain bowls. It was founded in November 2006 by Nicolas Jammet, Nathaniel Ru, and Jonathan Neman. In August 2007, they opened their first store in Washington, D.C., three months after they graduated from the McDonough School of Business at Georgetown University.

Sweetgreen's corporate headquarters moved to the Los Angeles area from Washington, D.C., in 2016. As of May 2025, it had 251 stores in operation in 24 states and the District of Columbia. The CEO is Jonathan Neman; the company had over 6,000 employees as of 2025.

== History and financing ==
Sweetgreen was founded in 2006 by Nicolas Jammet, Nathaniel Ru, and Jonathan Neman, all Georgetown University students at the time. The trio were disappointed with campus food options.

Sweetgreen raised its initial $375,000 of startup funding from investors including the three founders' parents, Joe Bastianich, Seth Goldman, and Washington's Latino Economic Development Center. In 2013, it accepted a $22 million investment from Revolution Growth, a venture capital fund founded by Steve Case. In 2014, it received $18.5 million in investment from Revolution Growth. In 2015, it raised an additional $35 million in investment under the lead of T. Rowe Price with contributions from existing investor Revolution Growth. The company has raised over $95 million to date.

In 2018, the startup raised a $200 million Series H round led by Fidelity that valued the company at more than $1 billion, bringing Sweetgreen's total funding to $365 million. In the fall of 2019, Sweetgreen raised an additional $150 million Series I round led by Lone Pine Capital and D1 Capital Partners, bringing the company's total valuation to $1.6 billion.

In July 2021, Axios reported that Sweetgreen had filed confidentially for an IPO. It became a public company on November 18, 2021, traded under the New York Stock Exchange symbol SG.

In August 2021, Sweetgreen announced its plans to acquire Massachusetts Institute of Technology startup, Spyce, a Boston-based restaurant that uses service robots to prepare meals. Both Spyce locations closed and the team focused on building a "third generation" of its technology to increase throughput and accuracy for Sweetgreen, potentially starting in two locations in 2023.

In August 2022, Sweetgreen opened a location in Birmingham, Michigan, their first in Michigan, with plans to expand to Troy and Ann Arbor later in 2022.

In May 2023, Sweetgreen opened its first robot-driven Infinite Kitchen location in Naperville, Illinois, where the automation is used for food assembly, not the food preparation itself.

In May 2024, Sweetgreen reported a 26% Q1 revenue increase, reaching $157.9 million. This growth was primarily attributed to price increases across its menu. Notably, the company achieved an 18.1% profit margin per store, which is considered exceptional within the foodservice industry. Of particular interest were the results from two experimental "Infinite Kitchens" locations, which utilize robotic automation for bowl assembly. These locations reported a significantly higher profit margin of 28%, showcasing the potential impact of automation on the chain's operational efficiency.

In 2026, Sweetgreen announced they were collaborating with anti-vaxxer Dr. Mark Hyman to update their menu.

== Menu and digital app ==
Sweetgreen serves a variety of salads and warm bowls. Their seasonal menu rotates five times a year, based on produce availability and location.

The restaurant launched a mobile app in 2015. In May 2020, the brand added order status tracking and push notifications in real time, allowing the customers to know when their order is received or ready following restrictions from the COVID-19 pandemic. In January 2020, Sweetgreen launched its own delivery service within their app.

Customers can order in-store or through the app for pickup, delivery and outpost as well as use their app to pay for in-store ordering. Sweetgreen delivers catering to corporate offices, aiming to offer healthier food for fast food prices. In 2025 Sweetgreen opened two Sweetlane drive-thru locations.

== Social actions ==
Sweetgreen has partnered with local chefs and restaurants on time-limited menu items, often when opening locations in a new city. These collaborations have included chef duo Jon and Vinny in Los Angeles, Nancy Silverton, Michael Solomonov in Philadelphia area, Danny Bowein in New York, Ken Oringer in Boston, and Chris Shepherd in Houston.

Sweetgreen has collaborated multiple times with David Chang of Momofuku, including on a new salad dressing featured in the New York locations during the summer of 2014. In February 2020, Sweetgreen again partnered with David Chang to launch the Tingly Sweet Potato and Kelp Bowl. The collaboration brought attention to ocean acidification and its effects on marine life through the use of sustainable kelp.

In 2015, in the lead-up to the Sweetlife music festival, Sweetgreen collaborated with musician Kendrick Lamar leading up to his second appearance at the event. The salad, "Beets Don't Kale My Vibe," was a pun playing one of Lamar's most well-known lyrics. Ten percent of proceeds from the salad were donated to FoodCorps to connect kids to real food.

In 2018, Sweetgreen partnered with Hank's Mini Market, a family-owned corner store in L.A.'s Hyde Park neighborhood, a known food desert, to help bring healthier options to its customers as part of their work to expand food access.

In 2019, Sweetgreen partnered with FoodCorps again, committing $1 million over the next two years to support FoodCorps's endeavours.

During the onset of the COVID-19 crisis, Sweetgreen announced the launch of the Sweetgreen Impact Outpost Fund in partnership with World Central Kitchen to deliver free meals to hospital workers on the frontlines. In 2020, the company served more than 400,000 meals to over 400 hospitals nationwide.

Sweetgreen made it easier for employees to vote in the 2020 election by providing up to 3 hours of paid time off for all hourly employees to either vote early or vote on election day.

In May 2021, Sweetgreen announced their first-ever national athlete ambassador, tennis player Naomi Osaka. Osaka announced a new menu item supporting The Asian American Foundation.

== Controversies ==
In 2023, the CEO of Sweetgreen, Jonathan Neman, weighed in on the Gaza war protests at universities, saying he'd like to know the names of students involved in the protests so that Sweetgreen does not inadvertently hire any signers of perceived anti-Israel petitions signed by students.

== Lawsuits ==
In April 2023, Chipotle Mexican Grill sued Sweetgreen claiming that its trademark has been violated. As a result Sweetgreen changed the name of its burrito bowl “as part of a tentative agreement to resolve the lawsuit.”

== Sweetlife Festival ==
Between 2011 and 2016, Sweetgreen hosted an annual music and food festival at the Merriweather Post Pavilion in Columbia, Maryland. Sweetgreen has cut back on hosting large festivals, and instead has hosted outdoor concerts "with a much more compact bill."

=== Headliners ===
- 2011: The Strokes, Girl Talk, Lupe Fiasco
- 2012: Avicii, Kid Cudi, The Shins
- 2013: Phoenix, Passion Pit, Kendrick Lamar, Yeah Yeah Yeahs
- 2014: Lana Del Rey, Foster the People
- 2015: Kendrick Lamar, Calvin Harris, The Weeknd
- 2016: The 1975, Halsey, Flume

== Awards ==
Sweetgreen was named one of the Most Innovative Companies in 2019 and 2020, and it won the 2020 Webby Award for Food & Drink in the Apps, Mobile & Voice category.
