= Computer Stored Ambulatory Record =

Electronic medical record

COmputer STored Ambulatory Record (COSTAR) is an electronic medical record using the MUMPS programming language. It was developed by the Laboratory of Computer Science at Massachusetts General Hospital between 1968 and 1971 for Harvard Community Health Plan by Octo Barnett and Jerome Grossman.
