= Jive Software =

Business communication software company

- Type: Subsidiary
- Traded as: Nasdaq: JIVE
- Industry: Collaboration software
- Founded: 2001; 25 years ago
- Headquarters: Palo Alto, California, U.S.
- Key people: Elisa Steele (CEO, president); Bryan LeBlanc (CFO)
- Products: Jive; Openfire
- Revenue: ▲US$195.8 Million (2015)
- Number of employees: ▲658 (2014)
- Parent: Aurea Software, Inc.
- Website: www.jivesoftware.com

Jive Software, an Aurea Software company, is a provider of communication and collaboration software for business.

Jive was headquartered in Palo Alto, California. Founded in 2001, Jive maintains additional offices in Portland, OR; San Francisco, CA; New York, NY; Toronto, Ontario, Canada; Reading, UK; Frankfurt, Germany; São Paulo, Brazil; Tel Aviv, Israel; Melbourne, Australia; Hong Kong; Singapore, Tokyo and Paris. On June 12, 2017, Aurea completed the acquisition of Jive Software.

== History ==
Matt Tucker and Bill Lynch founded Jive in 2001 in Iowa; the company relocated to New York later that year. In 2004, the company moved its headquarters to Portland, Oregon.

At the end of 2009, Jive posted a record 85% percent increase in revenue in addition to securing $12 million in Series B funding from Sequoia Capital.

In 2011, Jive filed for a $100 million IPO. The company had its IPO on December 12, 2011, on the NASDAQ stock exchange, raising $161.3 million from investors, around $60 million higher than was planned.

On November 4, 2014, Tony Zingale announced his retirement as CEO and that he would take an extended role on the board as executive chairman. Jive appointed Elisa Steele president and to office of the CEO until the board found a replacement.

On February 10, 2015, Elisa Steele was named CEO, alongside her existing role as president. At the time, she was also named to the Jive board of directors.

By 2015, the company's customer and revenue growth had declined to a market cap of $400 million. Independent technology analysis firm, the Real Story Group, assessed the potential for a take over of the firm, postulating that Jive may represent "the canary in the coal mine," indicating a more systemic shift in the market for enterprise collaboration software.

On February 7, 2017, during an earnings call, Jive announced that the past quarter (Q4,2016) was the first where the company had achieved GAAP operating profitability.

== Acquisitions ==
On April 6, 2008, Jive acquired online calendar software company Jotlet for an undisclosed amount.

On January 7, 2010, Jive acquired Colorado-based social monitoring company Filtrbox for $1.7 million in cash and common stock.

In May 2011, Jive announced the acquisition of OffiSync, an Israeli startup that adds a collaboration layer to Microsoft Office applications.

In November 2012, Jive announced the acquisition of technology companies Producteev and Meetings.io for $7.6 million and 460,000 shares of Jive stock. Producteev produces a cloud-based task management application with web, desktop, and mobile clients. Meetings.io provides a chat and video conferencing tool. In May 2013, the company announced the newly redesigned version of Producteev by Jive as a stand-alone free app to individuals and teams. Jive released the real-time communication features from Meetings.io over the course of 2013. These features were then broken out into a stand-alone app called Jive Chime.

In May 2013, Jive announced the acquisition of CLARA and StreamOnce and detailed their integration in the Jive Platform. The integration of CLARA's Jive Resonata product brings community analytics to the platform and allows users to measure the reach, sentiment and influence of their work, and use predictive analysis to anticipate customer behavior.

== Acquisition by Aurea ==
On May 1, 2017, Jive announced that it had entered "into definitive agreement to become part of the Aurea family of companies for $462 million in cash." While this deal was mostly seen as a win for investors, some viewed it as a "fire sale", noting that investors lost millions.
