= Vivid Seats =

American ticket exchange and resale company

Vivid Seats Inc.
- Type: Public
- Traded as: Nasdaq: SEAT
- Industry: Live entertainment Technology; Event marketplace
- Founded: 2001; 25 years ago in Chicago, Illinois, United States
- Founders: Jerry Bednyak and Eric Vassilatos
- Headquarters: Chicago, Illinois, United States
- Area served: Worldwide
- Key people: David Donnini (chairman of the board,); Stan Chia (chief executive officer),
- Products: Tickets for sports, concerts, theater, entertainment events
- Revenue: $3.9 billion
- Number of employees: 760+ (2023)
- Website: www.vividseats.com

Vivid Seats Inc. is an American online ticket market place and resale company. It is the official ticketing partner of numerous sports teams and media outlets including ESPN, United Airlines, the San Francisco 49ers and the Los Angeles Chargers. Its rewards program allows fans to earn points on purchases. Vivid Seats is a member of the Internet Association, which advocates for net neutrality.

== History ==
Vivid Seats was founded in Chicago, Illinois, in 2001 by Jerry Bednyak and Eric Vassilatos.

Its major investors include Vista Equity Partners (2016) and GTCR (2017). GTCR bought a majority stake for a rumored $575 million.

The company went public on October 19, 2021 after a merger earlier in 2021 with Horizon Acquisition Corporation, a SPAC. It trades on Nasdaq as SEAT. Todd Boehly is chairman of Horizon Acquisitions Corporation, which announced that “Eldridge Industries, LLC, an affiliate of Horizon’s sponsor...has entered into an agreement with DraftKings to make a private placement PIPE investment in connection with the closing of the previously announced merger between Horizon and Vivid Seats.”

Vivid Seats closed 2023, its second full fiscal year as a public company, with net income of $74.5 million and revenue of $712.9 million, a 19% increase over FY 2022. In January 2022, the company reported that it had reached its 100 millionth ticket sold.

== Ticket Sales ==
Vivid Seats sells tickets in three event categories:

Sports – All major professional leagues (MLB, NFL, NBA, MLS, and NHL), college sports, and a wide variety of other sporting activities including golf, car racing, rodeo, boxing, and mixed martial arts.

Concerts – Musical acts across a broad range of genres touring major venues, small venues, and music festivals.

Theater – Broadway and off-Broadway plays and musicals, family entertainment events, comedy acts, and speaker series and regional productions, Las Vegas acts; and productions in national venues.

== Operations ==
Vivid Seats divides its business into Marketplace and Resale. Marketplace functions as an intermediary between ticket buyers, sellers and partners, earning revenue from processing ticket sales from its owned properties — websites and mobile applications, such as Vegas.com and Wavedash — and from numerous distribution partners. The Marketplace segment also includes Vivid Picks, a daily fantasy sports site. Marketplace facilitates customer payments, deposits and withdrawals, coordinates ticket deliveries, and provides customer service, earning revenue from service and delivery fees. Vivid Seats Resale buys event tickets to resell and holds ticket inventory.

Additional features include, Vivid Seats Rewards, a customer rewards program and Game Center, a daily mobile game app in which players can win points toward future purchases. Skybox is a B2B feature used by ticket suppliers to manage their ticket inventory, sales and prices.

It produces the Fan Forecast, which projects NFL crowd attendance by team. The San Francisco 49ers routinely have strong road attendance according to the projections.

== Expansion ==
In 2019, Vivid Seats began a series of acquisitions. In April of that year it bought Fanxchange, a Toronto-based software company specializing in ticketing solutions for loyalty programs, financial institutions, and hotel operators, among other entities.

In December 2021, Vivid Seats acquired Betcha Sports, Inc., a daily fantasy sports mobile application with social and gamification features. In August 2022, the company rebranded Betcha as Vivid Picks, LLC and integrated it into its features. In 2023, Vivid Seats announced the purchase of WD Holdings Co., Ltd. or “Wavedash,” an online ticket marketplace headquartered in Tokyo; and Vegas.com, a travel website that informs users on shows and attractions in Las Vegas, for $240 million in a cash-and-stock deal. On July 18th 2025, Vivid Seats shutdown Vivid Picks and the app is now only available for withdrawals.

== Partnerships ==
Vivid Seats has numerous partnerships for ticketing and other services with media outlets, sports teams, and rewards programs.

It is the official ticket provider for ESPN, as of February 2017, replacing StubHub; Sports Illustrated; and The Bleacher Report, the sports website and media brand.

Its college team partnerships include University of Tennessee, the University of Rhode Island, University of Notre Dame and Duke University, while its pro team partners for ticketing and other services, include Los Angeles Clippers of the NBA.

Vivid Seats has partnered with Capital One to launch Capital One Entertainment, a rewards program for cardholders.
