= Martin Williams Advertising =

Martin Williams Advertising, Inc.
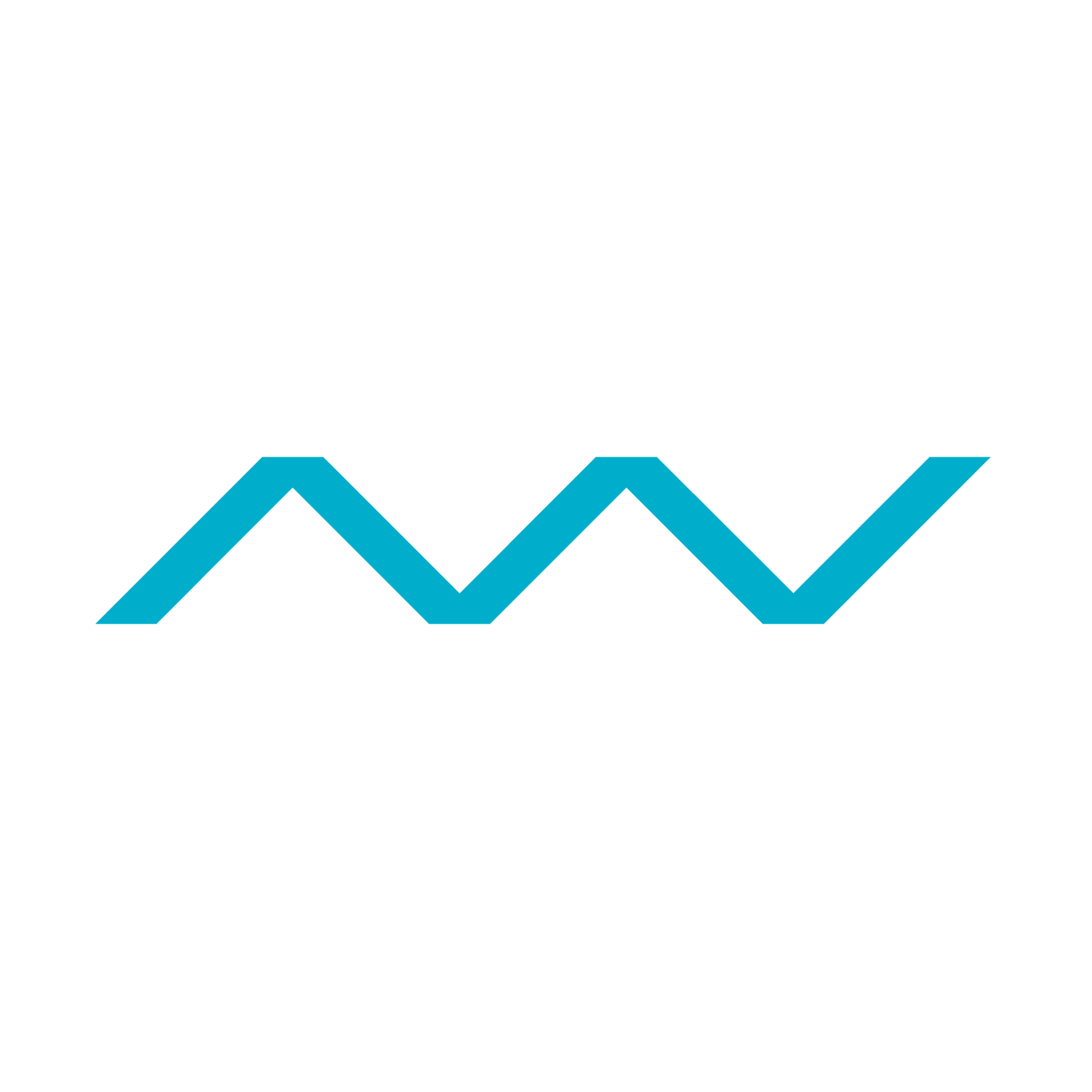
- Company type: Subsidiary of Omnicom Group
- Industry: Advertising, marketing
- Founded: 1947
- Headquarters: Minneapolis, Minnesota
- Key people: Founders: Royce Martin; Larry Williams
- Website: martinwilliams.com

Martin Williams Advertising, Inc. is an advertising agency, based in Minneapolis, Minnesota. Since 1998, Martin Williams has been part of the Omnicom Group. Clients include Payless ShoeSource, Raymond James, Syngenta, Cargill, Marvin Windows, Simmons Bedding Company, and P.F. Chang.

== History ==
Martin Williams was founded in 1947 by Royce Martin and Larry Williams. The pair had recently left McKenzie, another Minneapolis advertising agency, bringing the Creamette Company with them as their first client. At the time, Creamette was owned by Williams’ family.

In its early years, Martin Williams focused on account service and media capabilities, while shopping creative work out to freelancers. In 1960, Larry Williams sold his shares in the agency to Royce Martin and left to become the Vice President at Creamette. In 1964, Don Hagg joined Martin Williams as creative director, and, in 1966, Hagg and Steve Martin (Royce's son) took over the agency.

Between 1972 and 1977, Martin Williams went from 21 employees and $4 million in billings to 52 employees and $13 million in billings. In 1975, Martin Williams began a longstanding relationship with 3M, later working with the company to launch Post-it notes. In 1980, Marvin Windows named Martin Williams as their agency of record, a relationship now in its fourth decade.

In 1984, Martin Williams employees David Floren and Tom Weyl purchased the company. In 1989, Martin Williams was sold to Gold Greenlees Trott, and, in 1998, became part of Omnicom's TBWA Worldwide network when the New York-based holding company purchased GGT for $235 million.

In June 2005, veteran Omnicom creative director Tom Moudry became President and Chief Creative Officer at Martin Williams. Following the retirement of Steve Collins in December of that year, Moudry assumed the role of Chief Executive Officer, in addition to maintaining the position of CCO. 15-year Martin Williams veteran Mike Gray was named the agency's president and Chief Marketing Officer, while Tim Frojd, a 24-year Martin Williams employee, retained his role as Chief Financial Officer and Chairman.

In November 2016, Lori Davis became President of Martin Williams. In January 2017, Tom Moudry left Martin Williams. Lori Davis is now the leader of Martin Williams.

== Awards ==
In 2012, Martin Williams won a Silver Effie award in the "Financial Products and Services" category for its "Life Well Planned" campaign for Raymond James Financial.

In June 2011, Martin Williams was awarded a Bronze Effie award in the “good works – nonprofit” category for its work on behalf of Finnegan's Irish Amber.

In 2010, Martin Williams won AdWeek Magazine's Buzz Award for best use of viral marketing on behalf of client Integrity Windows.

== Memorable campaigns ==
- Kemps – “It’s the cows.”
- Marvin Windows – “Made to order.”
- American Cancer Society – “Butts are gross.”
