= Katie Mehnert =

American energy executive

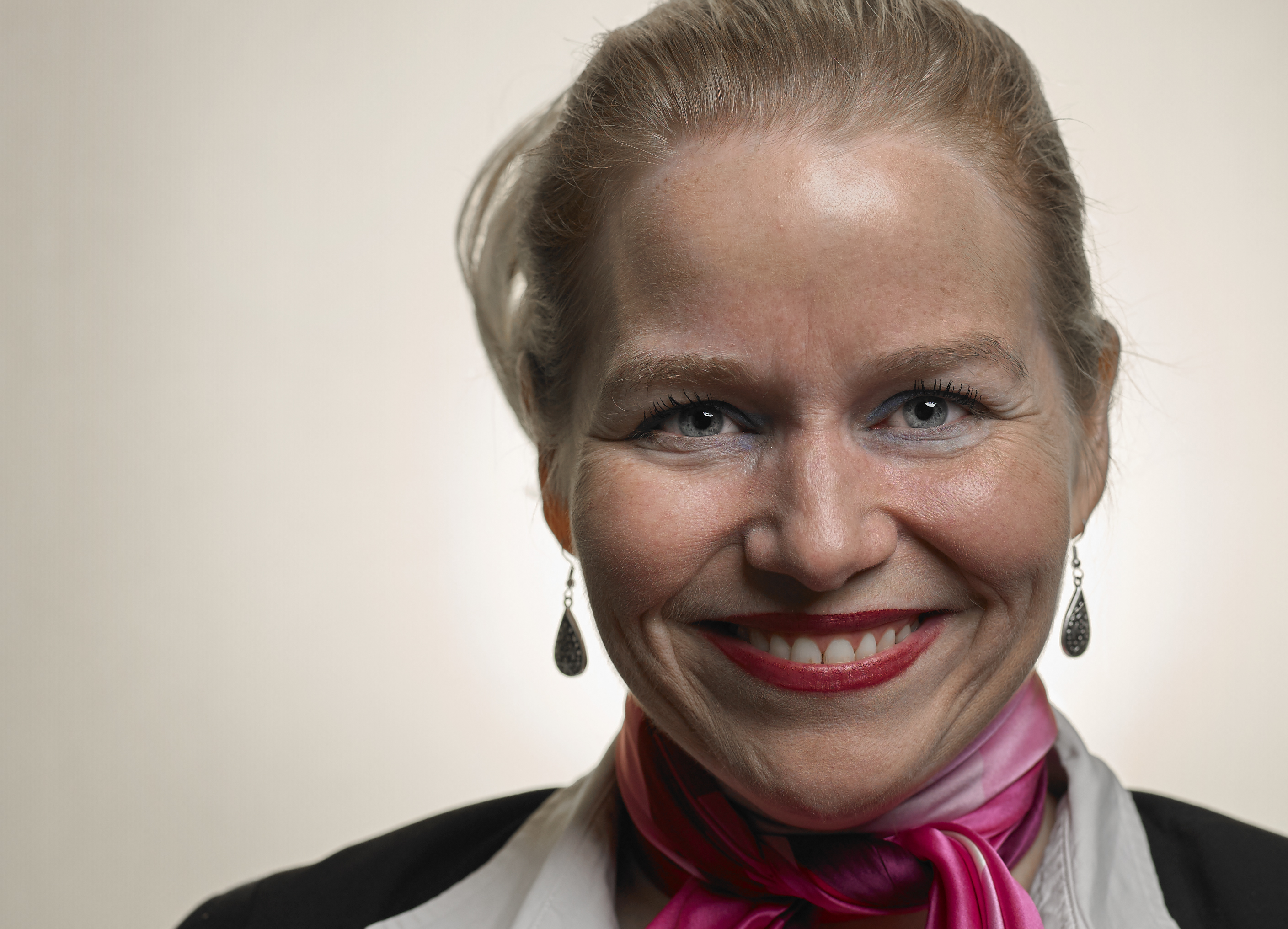
- Mehnert in 2015
- Born: December 27, 1975 (age 50); New Orleans, Louisiana
- Education: Louisiana State University; Rice University
- Years active: 1997–current
- Employer: Ally Energy
- Title: Chief Executive Officer
- Spouse: Mark Mehnert
- Website: www.katiemehnert.com

Katie Mehnert (born December 27, 1975) is an American energy executive, entrepreneur, business author, activist, and speaker. She is the founder and chief executive officer of Ally Energy, an online workforce development platform and career website for the energy industry.

== Education ==
Mehnert received a Bachelor of Arts degree from Louisiana State University in 1997 and later attended Jesse H. Jones Graduate School of Business in 2009 for executive education in energy. She is a graduate of the Center for Houston's Future.

== Career ==
Mehnert worked as a management consultant from 1997–2004 in the energy industry with Enron, Duke Energy, Waste Management, and Entergy. She left her position to join Shell as a global program & change leader in 2004, having stayed for 7 years working in health and safety. She joined BP as the director of culture, safety, and operational risk after the Deepwater Horizon spill.

In 2013, Mehnert got the idea for Pink Petro. A year later, she left BP to launch Pink Petro and focus on creating an online community to improve the livelihood of women professionals in the energy industry. She launched the community with initial support from Shell, Halliburton and KPMG. In 2016, she launched the HERWorld Energy forum (now called Energy 2.0) to foster connections between women in energy worldwide.

In 2020, Pink Petro rebranded as ALLY Energy. In 2021, ALLY acquired Clean Energy Social, a jobs and networking community for the clean energy industry.

For her advocacy in gender and racial equality in the energy sector, Mehnert was named a Top 40 under 40 in the Houston Business Journal. She was named a Top Woman to Watch in Energy and a Top 50 Houston Woman. She's also received the Vanguard Award for developing a pool of talent in STEM careers from Girls Inc, and the recipient of the YWCA's Top Woman in Energy. Mehnert has also received the Women Who Mean Business award in energy, and was named a Global World Affairs Council Leader of Influence in 2021.

== US Department of Energy ==
In 2020, Mehnert was appointed by the Honorable James Campos under the Trump Administration to serve as an Ambassador to the United States Department of Energy in its Equity and Energy initiative. In 2022, Mehnert was appointed by Secretary Jennifer Granholm to the National Petroleum Council.

== Hurricane Harvey ==
In August 2017, Mehnert lost her West Houston home and business due to the federally ordered reservoir releases made by the United States Army Corps of Engineers during Hurricane Harvey. While Harvey dumped a few feet of water into her home, the Mehnerts were able to stay on the second story. But a controlled release of nearby reservoirs washed through neighborhoods like hers in west Houston, submerging many homes above the first story. She and her daughter were rescued by volunteers on August 29.

== Advocacy and activism ==
In 2019, Mehnert testified before US Congress on the Clean Energy Workforce of the Future. In 2021, Mehnert joined the cast of Hot Money, a documentary aimed at discussing the financial impact of climate change. The film was directed by Susan Kucera and produced by actor Jeff Bridges and Wesley Clark.

== Books ==
- Grow with the Flow: Embrace Difference, Overcome Fear, and Progress with Purpose – ISBN 1634893239
- Everyday Superheroes: Women in Energy Careers – ISBN 1634894340
