= Trupanion =

American pet insurance provider

Trupanion, Inc.
- Type: Public
- Traded as: Nasdaq: TRUP; Russell 2000 component S&P 600 component
- Industry: Pet insurance
- Founded: 1999; 27 years ago
- Founder: Darryl Rawlings
- Headquarters: Seattle, Washington, U.S.
- Area served: Puerto Rico, Canada and The United States
- Key people: Margaret Tooth (CEO)
- Services: Insurance
- Revenue: ▲US$904.1 million (2022)
- Operating income: ▼ -US$43.001 million (2022)
- Net income: ▼ -US$44.6 million (2022)
- Total assets: ▲US$671 million (2022)
- Total equity: ▼US$305 million (2022)
- Parent: Vetinsurance International, Inc.
- Website: trupanion.com

Trupanion, Inc. is a pet insurance provider headquartered in Seattle, Washington. Established in 1998, Trupanion operates across the United States, Canada, Australia, and Puerto Rico. The company offers coverage for pets and is self-underwritten by the American Pet Insurance Company (APIC).

== History ==
Originally known as Vetinsurance, Trupanion was founded in Canada by current chairman Darryl Rawlings in 1999.

Trupanion raised $22 million in 2007 from investors including Maveron, RenaissanceRe, and a large private equity group. Subsequently, a Series B round was completed in 2008, followed by a $9 million Series C round of financing led by the Highland Consumer Fund in 2011.

In 2014, Trupanion went public, raising $71 million during its initial public offering (IPO). The company continued its growth trajectory, culminating in October 2020 with the completion of a Private Investment in Public Equity (PIPE) funding round amounting to $200 million. By the end of the 2020 fiscal year, Trupanion reported revenue of $502 million.

== PHI Direct and Furkin ==
In 2021, Trupanion introduced two new pet insurance products, namely PHI Direct and Furkin.

These insurance offerings were specifically launched in Canada and were designed to provide pet medical coverage through online platforms, offering various price points to cater to different needs and budgets.

== Recognition and Company Culture ==
In 2010, The Seattle Times Company recognized Trupanion as Seattle's 'Most Pet-Friendly Company,' noting its policy allowing employees to bring pets to work and the provision of an on-site dog walking service.

Additionally, The Seattle Times recognized Trupanion with the 'Most Unusual Perk' title for offering employees the option to insure their pets with a $0 deductible. In the Best of KOMO Communities survey conducted by KOMO News, Trupanion was awarded both 'Best Place to Work' and 'Best Local Business' accolades.

In 2011, The Huffington Post recognized Trupanion as one of nine companies in the nation that promote a healthy work-life balance for their employees. Notable companies on the list included Google, Netflix, and Zappos.

On August 9, 2012, The Puget Sound Business Journal announced Washington's Best Workplaces at Safeco Field in Seattle and honored Trupanion with the Washington's Best Workplaces 2012 Large Company Bronze Medal.

== Charitable donations ==
In May 2011, Trupanion forged a partnership with the American Humane Association to support the Second Chance Fund, an initiative dedicated to providing financial aid to animal welfare organizations.

Additionally, in August 2012, the American Humane Association announced Trupanion's sponsorship of the service dog category in the 2012 American Humane Association Hero Dog Awards.
