= Potbelly Sandwich Shop =

American fast-casual restaurant chain

Potbelly Corporation
- Type: Subsidiary
- Industry: Fast casual
- Founded: January 14, 1977; 49 years ago
- Founder: Peter Hastings
- Headquarters: The Gogo Building, 111 N. Canal Street, Chicago, Illinois, U.S.
- Number of locations: Over 400
- Area served: United States
- Key people: Robert Wright (president & CEO); Bryant Keil (founding chairman)
- Products: Sandwiches, salads, soups, ice cream
- Revenue: 409,707,000 United States dollar (2019)
- Owner: RaceTrac
- Website: potbelly.com

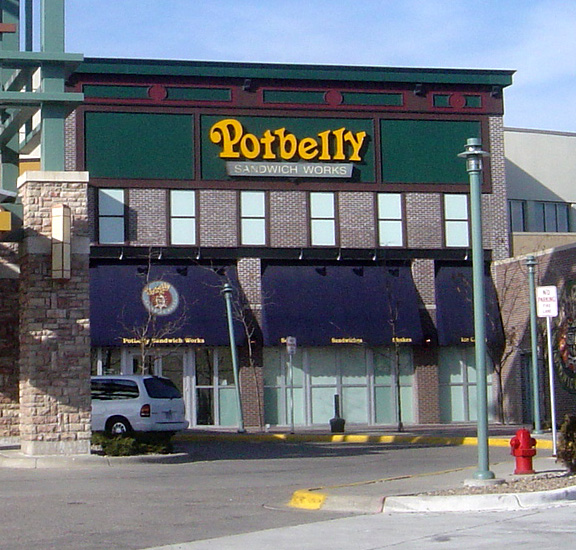
A location in Eden Prairie, Minnesota

Potbelly Sandwich Shop, also known as Potbelly Sandwich Works, is an American fast-casual restaurant chain with over 400 locations that focuses on submarine sandwiches and milkshakes. It is owned by RaceTrac.

Potbelly was founded in 1977 in Chicago, and its name refers to the potbelly stove. Potbelly offers sandwiches, many served hot, and soup, shakes, smoothies, potato chips, and cookies. Some locations formerly presented live music from local musicians during the lunch hours.

Potbelly carries Zapp's potato chips and previously had an exclusive Zapp's brand of dill pickle chips that had the flavor of a Potbelly pickle.

== History ==
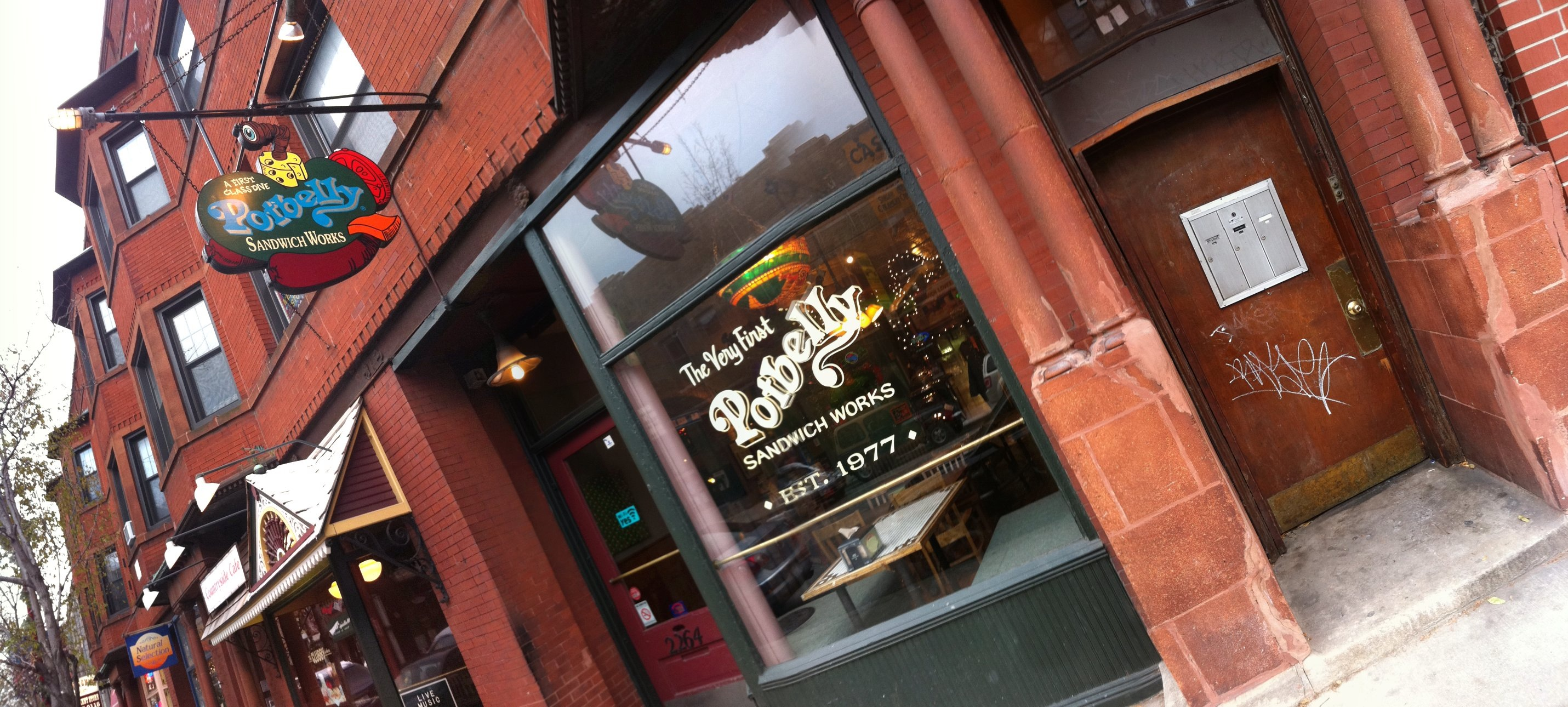
The first Potbelly restaurant, in Lincoln Park, Chicago

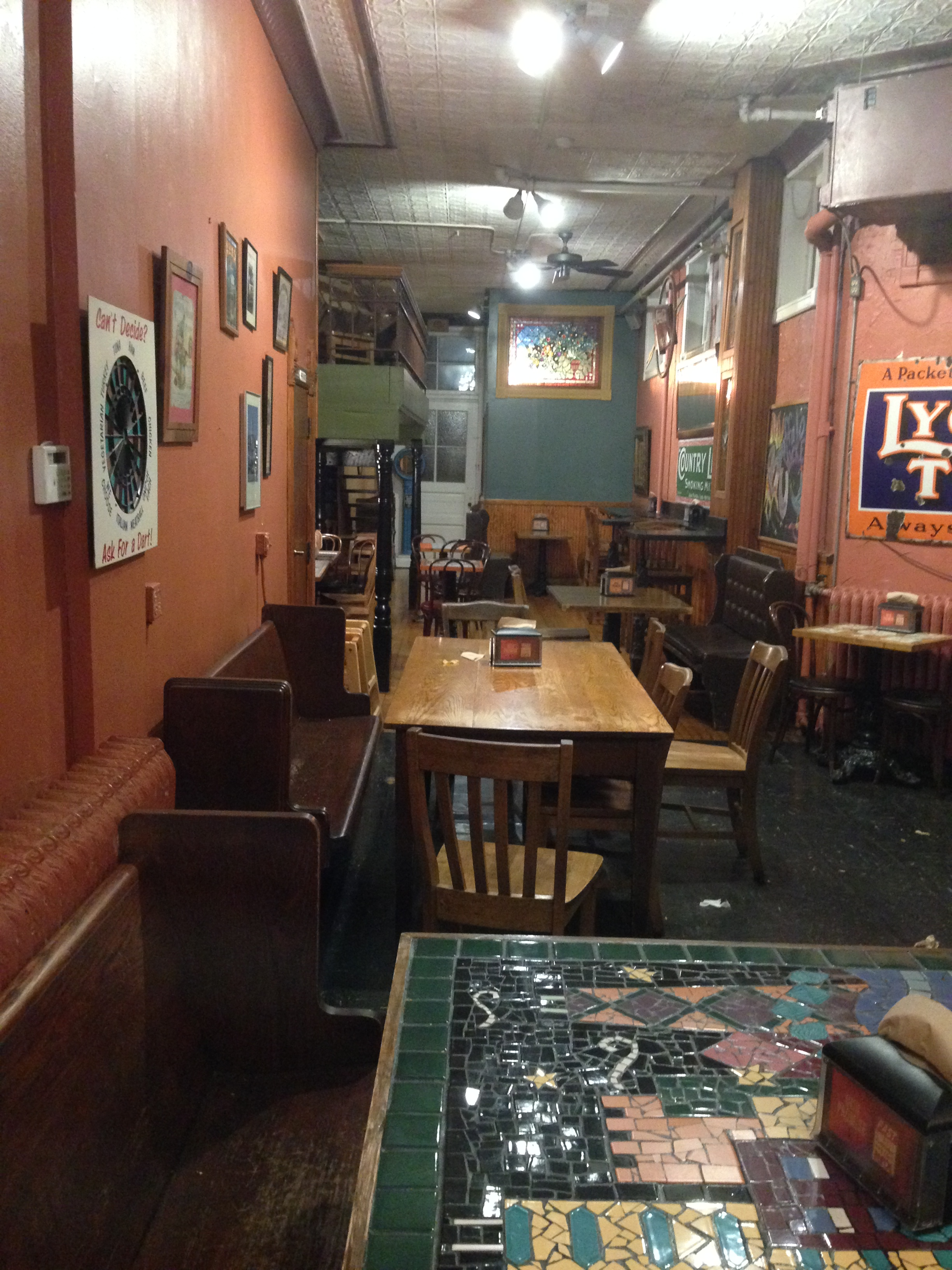
A view inside the first Potbelly Restaurant seating area

In 1971, Peter Hastings started an antique store, Hindsight, at 2264 North Lincoln Avenue in the Lincoln Park neighborhood of Chicago. The store had an old potbelly stove, which Hastings began using to make toasted sandwiches to serve to shoppers. In 1977, the Hindsight store was retooled into a restaurant, Potbelly Sandwich Works.

Since 1977, Potbelly has partnered with Turano in Chicago for bread products.

In 1996, Bryant Keil purchased the original store and converted it into a full-scale restaurant. The second Potbelly store opened in 1997, and he expanded Potbelly to over 250 stores in several states and the District of Columbia by 2008.

In 2001, Maveron, founded by former Starbucks chairman and executive Howard Schultz and Dan Levitan, invested in the company and became its largest shareholder. It sold most of its stake by 2016.

In November 2007, a new Potbelly store in Glen Ellyn, Illinois became the first to feature a drive-through. A second drive-through store was added shortly thereafter in Waukegan, Illinois.

In February 2011, Potbelly opened two franchise stores in Dubai in the United Arab Emirates owned by Alshaya Group, the first international Potbelly locations.

In October 2013, Potbelly became a public company via an initial public offering. The stock closed up 120% on its first day of trading. At that time, its largest shareholders were Maveron with a 28% stake, ASP PSW LLC, managed by American Securities with 12.9%, and Oak Investment Partners with 12.2%.

Potbelly opened its first European store at Westfield Stratford City, London, in July 2015. It opened its first Canadian store in Toronto in October 2016.

By August 2017, 60% of Potbelly's business came from lunch. It had 424 owned stores and 54 franchised stores.

In December 2017, Potbelly opened its first franchise in India with a location in Cyber City, Gurgaon, operated by Kwals Group.

Decreased sales caused by the COVID-19 pandemic resulted in nearly 30% loss in annual revenue and 28 store closures.

During the COVID-19 pandemic, Potbelly applied for and accepted $10 million under the Paycheck Protection Program. Even though it qualified for the loan, some people criticized the loan as Potbelly was not a small business; it returned the loan in April 2020 after outrage.

In July 2020, Potbelly named Robert Wright, a former executive of Wendy's, its president and CEO.

In April 2022, Potbelly entered its first delivery-based franchise partnership with REEF, the largest operator of virtual restaurants, logistics, and proximity hubs in North America.

In May 2023, a Potbelly in downtown Portland paid almost $100,000 to hire consulting firm Optimal Employee Relations to reduce efforts of employees to form a labor union. It allegedly fired three workers who led the union campaign.

By the fourth quarter of 2023, 41% of sales came from digital channels.

In January 2024, the firm unveiled a redesigned Potbelly Perks loyalty program with new benefits. At that time it had 425 restaurants, including 80 franchises.

In March 2025, Potbelly announced an incentive program for franchisees including reduced fees for operators that open at least 15 units in eight years.

In October 2025, Potbelly was acquired by RaceTrac for $566 million.

== See also ==
- List of submarine sandwich restaurants
