= Co–Star =

Astrological social networking service

- Initial release: October 17, 2017; 8 years ago
- Operating system: iOS, Android
- Available in: English
- Type: Astrology and social networking
- License: Proprietary software
- Website: costarastrology.com

Co–Star Astrology Society
- Industry: Astrology; Social networking
- Founded: October 17, 2017; 8 years ago
- Founder: Banu Guler; Anna Kopp; Ben Weitzman
- Headquarters: New York City
- Website: costarastrology.com

Co–Star is an American astrological social networking service founded in 2017, and headquartered in New York City. Users enter the date, time and place they were born to generate an astrological chart and daily horoscopes, which can be compared with those of other users.

== History ==
The concept for Co-Star began in 2015 when Banu Guler created an astrological chart as a gift. The idea later developed into a mobile application with collaborators Anna Kopp and Ben Weitzman. The app publicly launched in 2017.

The app includes astrological readings, charts, and daily push notifications that have been noted for their unconventional tone.

In early 2018, the company raised a $750,000 pre-seed round from Female Founders Fund. In 2019, Co–Star raised a $5.2 million seed round from Maveron, Aspect, and 14W.

In January 2020, Co–Star for Android was launched to a 120,000-person waitlist—two years after their iOS version. In April 2021, the company announced a $15 million Series A, led by Spark Capital. As of that date, Co–Star reported more than 20 million downloads and increased adoption among young women in the United States.

== Features ==
Co–Star employs artificial intelligence to analyze publicly accessible NASA JPL data and find patterns in a user's transits. Co–Star's algorithm maps human-written snippets of text to planetary movements to display personalized content for each user. That content has been called “slightly robotic,” “wildly beautiful,” “truly insane," “brutally honest,” and compared to “a free therapy session.”

In July 2023, Co–Star released an in-app service called The Void that allows users to ask open-ended questions and receive answers informed by Co–Star's astrological database.

== See also ==
- Astrology
- NASA
- Timeline of social media
