= Zak Normandin =

American entrepreneur and product designer

- Born: January 29, 1984 (age 42); Leominster, Massachusetts, United States
- Citizenship: American
- Education: Franklin Pierce University (BS)
- Occupations: Entrepreneur, product designer
- Known for: Founder of Iris Nova, Dirty Lemon, and Little Duck Organics
- Children: 3

Zak Normandin (born January 29, 1984) is an American entrepreneur and product designer who served as Founder and CEO of Iris Nova until the company ceased operations in 2022. Iris Nova was the parent company of NYC-based beverage brand Dirty Lemon. He had previously founded Little Duck Organics, a privately held New York City based company focused on organic children's snacks.

Normandin is best known for innovative consumer product package designs, advocacy of organic food products and development of the text-message based conversational commerce platform used by Dirty Lemon, and the portfolio of Iris Nova beverage brands.

== Early life ==
Normandin was born in Leominster, MA in 1984. He studied at Franklin Pierce University in Rindge, New Hampshire.

== Career ==
He began his career as a Marine Engineer in the United States Coast Guard. The idea for the food company developed from the observation that there was a lack of healthy, sugar-free food options available for children. He started Little Duck Organics in his basement in 2009.

Shortly after its launch, the brand received funding from angel investors and venture capitalists, including Chris Burch and Tom First.

In 2011, at Natural Products Expo East, he was awarded Best Packaging for a design Normandin created for the Tiny Fruits product line. In 2012, Little Duck Organics was featured in a roundup of prominent trade-show exhibits alongside Nintendo, Nike, and Red Bull. In 2011, Little Duck Organics received the "Best Packaging" award at Expo East for their new packaging designs for organic children snacks.

Normandin developed Plantable packaging for their product, which contains seeds that can grow into vegetables when planted. As of 2014, under his leadership, Little Duck Organics achieved a retail presence in more than 30 countries. In 2014, Normandin sold majority control of Little Duck Organics, and left the company to start a creative agency and product development house.

In 2015, Normandin co-founded Dirty Lemon, which received notable attention from celebrities such as Kate Hudson, Karlie Kloss, Mindy Kaling, and Cardi B.

DIRTY LEMON is an omni-channel functional beverage brand with products which utilizes Iris Nova's SMS-based e-commerce platform, a technology ideated by Normandin.

In 2018, Normandin raised a $15M SEED round for Iris Nova, the parent company of Dirty Lemon. The round of funding was led by Coca-Cola North America’s Venturing and Emerging Brands (VEB) unit with additional support from Greycroft, GGV Capital, Imaginary Ventures, CASSIUS Family, PLUS Capital, Nebari Ventures, Winklevoss Capital, Betaworks Ventures, and Lakehouse Ventures.

In 2020, Iris Nova reduced its workforce by half due to severe disruptions in retail and wholesale operations caused by the COVID-19 pandemic, ultimately shutting down operations in 2022.

== Recognition ==
- In 2018, Normandin was recognized as a '2018 Visionary' by Consumer Goods Technology.
- In 2018, Normandin was recognized as a '2018 Total Retail Game Changer' by Total Retail.
- In 2019, Normandin was recognized as a '2019 Disruptive Innovation Leader' by INNOCOS.
- In 2019, Normandin was recognized as one of 2019's '100 Most Intriguing Entrepreneurs' by Goldman Sachs.
- In 2020, Normandin was recognized as one of 2020's '100 Most Intriguing Entrepreneurs' by Goldman Sachs.
- In 2021, Normandin was recognized as one of 2021's 'Most Daring Creators' by Boutique Leaders Lifestyle Association.
- In 2021, Normandin was recognized as one of 2021's '40 Under 40 Trailblazers Driving the Next Era of Retail' by design:retail and Retail Touchpoints.
