= Nearshoring =

Outsourcing of business processes to a nearby country

Nearshoring is the outsourcing of business processes, especially information technology processes, to companies in a nearby country, often sharing a border with the target country. Both parties expect to benefit from one or more of the following dimensions of proximity: geographic, temporal (time zone), cultural, social, linguistic, economic, political, or historical linkages.

Nearshoring is a type of outsourcing where a given company seeks a development partner in a different country or region. However, what distinguishes nearshoring from other types of outsourcing is the fact that the development partner is still in close proximity. Since companies are usually in the same time zone, this facilitates communication and allows for frequent visits.

== Overview ==
Offshoring involves relocating work to a foreign organization to reduce costs, but challenges include time differences, local labor laws, and reduced oversight. For example, a Western European IT company may outsource software development to India for its skilled, low-cost workforce, but the distance complicates management and increases risks like fraud and intellectual property theft.

In Europe, nearshoring relationships are between clients in larger European economies and various providers in smaller European nations. Major centers are in Spain, Czech Republic, Hungary, Portugal, Poland, Slovakia, Romania, Bulgaria, Belarus and the Baltic. There are also nearshore centers in larger markets, such as Russia and Ukraine. These destinations are attractive because they are low-cost, have skilled labor forces, and a less stringent regulatory environment, but crucially they allow for more day to day physical oversight. They also have strong cultural ties to the major economic centers in Europe. For example, Bulgaria is now considered to be a viable outsourcing destination for such companies as German software company SAP, where labor costs are low, and the skills available, but which is also closer to home. In 2009, the Central-Eastern European Outsourcing Association (CEEOA) published research estimating that the Eastern European region has over 95,000 IT specialists involved in the industry, working for close to 5000 companies.

In the USA, American clients nearshore to Canada and Mexico, or both, as well as to many other nations in Central and South America, like Argentina, Brazil, Costa Rica or Colombia, and the Caribbean, to the Dominican Republic, Guyana, Jamaica, and the U.S. Virgin Islands.

A popular type of nearshoring is in software development, with the main benefit being many skilled developers available at low cost. Call centers, shared services centers, and BPO (Business Process Outsourcing) are also common choices for nearshoring, as the value of offshore outsourcing hotbeds like Philippines lowers.

The complexity of offshoring stems from different languages and cultures, long distances and different time zones, spending more time and effort on establishing trust and long-term relationships, overriding communication barriers and activities of that kind. Many nearshore providers attempted to circumvent communication and project management barriers by developing new ways to align organizations. As a result, concepts such as remote insourcing were created to give clients more control in managing their own projects. Despite recent developments, nearshoring does not necessarily overcome all of the barriers, but the proximity allows more flexibility to align organizations.

Nearshoring has become a differentiator for those nations and providers who wish to set themselves apart from sourcing centers in Asia, especially the dominant India, which itself is seeing a sharp decline in BPO job growth.

Proficiency in the English language has become a sought-after skill as companies strive to capture a larger chunk of the US market. Universities, industry, and governments encourage the development of the language, so the hunt for skilled, English-speaking talent is slowly becoming easier.

== Origins ==
The term "Near Shore" was trademarked by the Mexican IT firm Softtek in 1997, seeking to enter the U.S. market with a differentiated approach to outsourcing. This coincided with the rising demand for offshoring in the late 1990s, served primarily by established Indian IT vendors. Rather than competing directly with those firms, Softtek positioned nearshoring as a complementary option for companies interested in diversifying their sourcing portfolios and managing operational risk.

This new model established the firm as a near-shore alternative, leveraging Mexico’s proximity to the United States, shared time zones, and cultural similarities as key competitive advantages. To facilitate cross-border operations, Softtek leveraged NAFTA-enabled travel and visa advantages, aligned its holiday schedules with those of the U.S., and collaborated with local universities to cultivate a skilled workforce suited to international client needs. Establishing rigorous quality standards also became essential to compete with traditional offshore providers, with Softtek demonstrating that high levels of process maturity, like CMMI Level 5 and Six Sigma certifications, were achievable outside of India.

Credited with inventing the nearshore concept through its Near Shore model, Softtek bore much of the responsibility for educating the market on its benefits and distinctions from traditional offshoring. This challenge led to the development of the Total Cost of Engagement (TCE) model in 2005, a framework designed to assess not only direct costs but also the broader expenses associated with outsourcing, thus demonstrating the long-term value nearshoring could offer beyond hourly rates. The TCE model helped position nearshore services as a cost-effective alternative that could achieve comparable savings to offshore providers while addressing additional aspects like operational alignment and risk management.

In 2023, Nuevo León Governor Samuel García acknowledged Softtek's pioneering role in nearshoring, noting that the concept had contributed to Mexico's economic growth and increased foreign direct investment.

== See also ==
- Co-sourcing
- Offshoring
