= Namely (company) =

- Type: Private
- Industry: Human Resources Management System
- Founded: 2012
- Headquarters: New York City, United States
- Area served: New York, San Francisco, Atlanta, Austin, and Los Angeles
- Key people: Larry Dunivan (CEO)
- Number of employees: 500
- Website: www.namely.com

Namely is a United States–based human resources software company, founded in Greenpoint, Brooklyn, on January 17, 2012. Namely offers human resources management tools to businesses.

== History ==
On January 17, 2012, Namely was founded in Greenpoint, Brooklyn.

Namely’s early service offering included HR information system, social newsfeed, payroll, and performance management tools. In 2016, Namely and Cigna introduced a new benefits exchange that included 12 pre-defined medical, dental, vision, and life insurance plans. That year, Namely also relocated its corporate headquarters to lower Manhattan. In 2017, Namely introduced two new services: Time Management and Managed Services.

Since then, Namely has grown to add four more office locations in San Francisco, Los Angeles, Atlanta, and Austin. Currently, it has over 500 employees and serves more than 1000 clients.

In May 2018, the company fired its founder and CEO Matt Straz for actions “inconsistent with that which is expected of Namely leadership". In August Elisa Steele was appointed as Namely’s permanent CEO. In July 2019, Larry Dunivan succeeded Elisa Steele as CEO.

== Funding ==
Namely received its Series A funding in June 2013, raising $3.4 million with True Ventures as the lead investor.

In November 2014, Namely raised a $12M Series B.

In June 2015, Sequoia Capital lead a $45M Series C.

Led by Altimeter and Scale Venture Partners, Namely raised $50M in Series D funding in January 2017. After nine rounds from 24 investors, the company reached over $157.8M in total equity funding.

In August 2018, Namely announced a $60M growth round led by GGV Capital.
