= List of companies based in Seattle =

This is a list of large or well-known interstate or international companies headquartered in the Seattle metropolitan area.

As of December 2021, the Seattle metropolitan area is home to ten Fortune 500 companies: Internet retailer Amazon (#2), Costco Wholesale (#12), Microsoft (#15), coffee chain Starbucks (#125), Paccar (#159), clothing merchant Nordstrom (#289), Weyerhaeuser (#387), Expeditors International (#299), Alaska Airlines (#459), and Expedia (#500).

== Biotechnology ==
- Alder Biopharmaceuticals (Bothell)
- Dendreon – immunotherapeutics (defunct)
- Juno Therapeutics (defunct)
- NanoString Technologies – life sciences tools
- Seagen (Bothell)
- ZymoGenetics – therapeutic protein

== Computer hardware ==
- Cray Inc. – supercomputers
- EMC Isilon – computer storage
- F5 Networks – application delivery controllers

== Conglomerates ==
- Vulcan Inc. – investment vehicle for Paul Allen

== Consulting ==
- Alvarez and Marsal – management consulting, turnaround management and performance improvement
- Avanade – business and technology consulting and information technology consulting
- Slalom Consulting – management consulting and information technology consulting

== Design ==
- ClearSign Combustion

== Financial ==
- Gravity Payments
- Moss Adams
- Russell Investments
- Seattle Credit Union
- WaFd Bank

== Food and beverage ==
- American Seafoods – management company for fishing vessels in the Bering Sea
- Beecher's Handmade Cheese
- Caffe Vita Coffee Roasting Company – coffee retailer
- Crowd Cow – online meat delivery marketplace
- Darigold – dairy agricultural marketing cooperative
- Jones Soda – soft drink maker
- MOD Pizza – pizza restaurant chain
- Pagliacci Pizza – pizza restaurant chain
- Piroshky Piroshky – pastry restaurant chain
- Seattle's Best Coffee
- Stanley 1913 - drinkware and food storage brand
- Starbucks – coffee retailer and coffeehouse chain
- Theo Chocolate – organic and fair trade chocolate manufacturer
- Trident Seafoods – management company for fishing vessels in the Bering Sea
- Tully's Coffee – coffee retailer and wholesaler
- Uwajimaya – Asian supermarket

== Healthcare ==
- Benaroya Research Institute
- CellNetix
- Center for Global Infectious Disease Research
- Emeritus Senior Living
- Fred Hutchinson Cancer Research Center
- Northwest Kidney Centers
- PATH
- The Polyclinic
- Providence Health and Services
- Remote Medical International
- Ventec Life Systems

== Insurance ==
- PEMCO – auto, home, boat, and life insurance
- Safeco – property insurance
- Trupanion – pet insurance

== Intellectual property ==
- Getty Images – stock photography
- Intellectual Ventures – patent assertion hedge fund

== Internet ==
- Allrecipes.com – online recipe service and forum
- Amazon – retail
- Avvo – legal services search
- Cheezburger – operates many humor web blogs such as I Can Has Cheezburger? and FAIL Blog
- Classmates.com – social networking service
- Coupang – retail
- eNotes.com – educational resource service
- ExtraHop Networks – cloud security analytics
- F5 Networks – application delivery controllers
- findwell – online real estate brokerage
- Groundspeak – operators of Geocaching.com
- JetPunk – online trivia
- Leafly – cannabis information
- Onvia – government business intelligence portal
- Panopto – video content management
- PayScale – global employee compensation database
- Penny Arcade – webcomic
- Porch – home services platform
- RealNetworks – software
- Redfin – online real estate brokerage
- Smartsheet – SaaS work collaboration software
- Soundrangers – online sound effects and music
- Sporcle – online trivia
- Tableau Software – data visualization
- Thrift Books – retail
- Turbo (formerly Spoon) – application virtualization
- WhitePages.com – online people search, reverse phone & address lookup, and business search
- Zillow.com – real estate information service

== Law ==
- Davis Wright Tremaine
- Lane Powell
- Perkins Coie

== Manufacturing ==
- Allied Marble & Granite – manufactured stone product installations
- Cutter & Buck – golf apparel
- Filson – outdoor apparel
- Pacific Coast Feather Company – bedding
- Tom Bihn – bags and luggage

== Pet care ==
- Rover.com – dog boarding and dog walking

== Property and architecture ==
- Bassetti Architects – architectural firm
- Callison – architectural firm
- Diamond Parking – parking lots
- Garret Cord Werner – architecture and interior design, reconstruction of historic places
- Howard S. Wright Companies – construction
- John L. Scott – real estate brokerage
- Johnson Braund Design Group – design and architectural firm
- MG2 – architectural firm
- Miller Hull Partnership – architecture and planning
- Mithun – architecture, landscape architecture, interior design, planning and urban design
- NBBJ – architectural firm
- Olson Kundig Architects – architectural firm
- Plum Creek Timber – timber
- Sellen Construction
- Weber Thompson – architectural firm
- Windermere Real Estate – real estate brokerage

== Public relations ==
- Waggener Edstrom – public relations

== Publishing ==
- Bilingual Books, Inc. – foreign language books and computer software
- Fantagraphics Books – comics and graphic novels
- Mountaineers Books – non-fiction books
- Sasquatch Books – non-fiction books

== Record labels ==
- Barsuk Records
- Sub Pop
- Tooth & Nail Records

== Retail ==
- Amazon
- Babeland (formerly Toys in Babeland) – sex toys
- Bartell Drugs
- Blue Nile Inc – diamonds
- Brooks Sports – athletic apparel
- Cascade Designs – outdoor apparel
- Cequint
- Indix – product intelligence database
- Julep – cosmetics and personal care
- K2 Sports – sporting goods and apparel
- NetMotion Wireless – Mobile VPN Solution
- Nordstrom – apparel
- The Omni Group – develops software for the Mac OS X platform
- Outdoor Research – apparel
- PCC Natural Markets – supermarket
- QFC – supermarket chain
- RealNetworks – Internet
- Rhapsody – online music service
- Sur La Table – cookware
- Tommy Bahama – apparel
- Zumiez – action sports
- Zulily – apparel and housewares

== Sports, leisure and entertainment ==
- Evo – outdoor retailer
- Puzzle Break – first American-based live escape room company

== Transportation ==
- Aero Controls Inc.
- Alaska Airlines – major US airline
- Ambassadors International – cruise ships
- Convoy – trucking logistics software
- Expeditors International – logistics
- Holland America Line – cruise ships
- Saltchuk – transportation and logistics
- Windstar Cruises – cruise ships

== Video games ==
- Arenanet – Guild Wars franchise
- Big Fish Games – casual games
- PopCap – casual games
- Sucker Punch Productions – Sly Cooper and Infamous franchise
- Undead Labs – State of Decay games

== Companies based in the Greater Seattle area ==
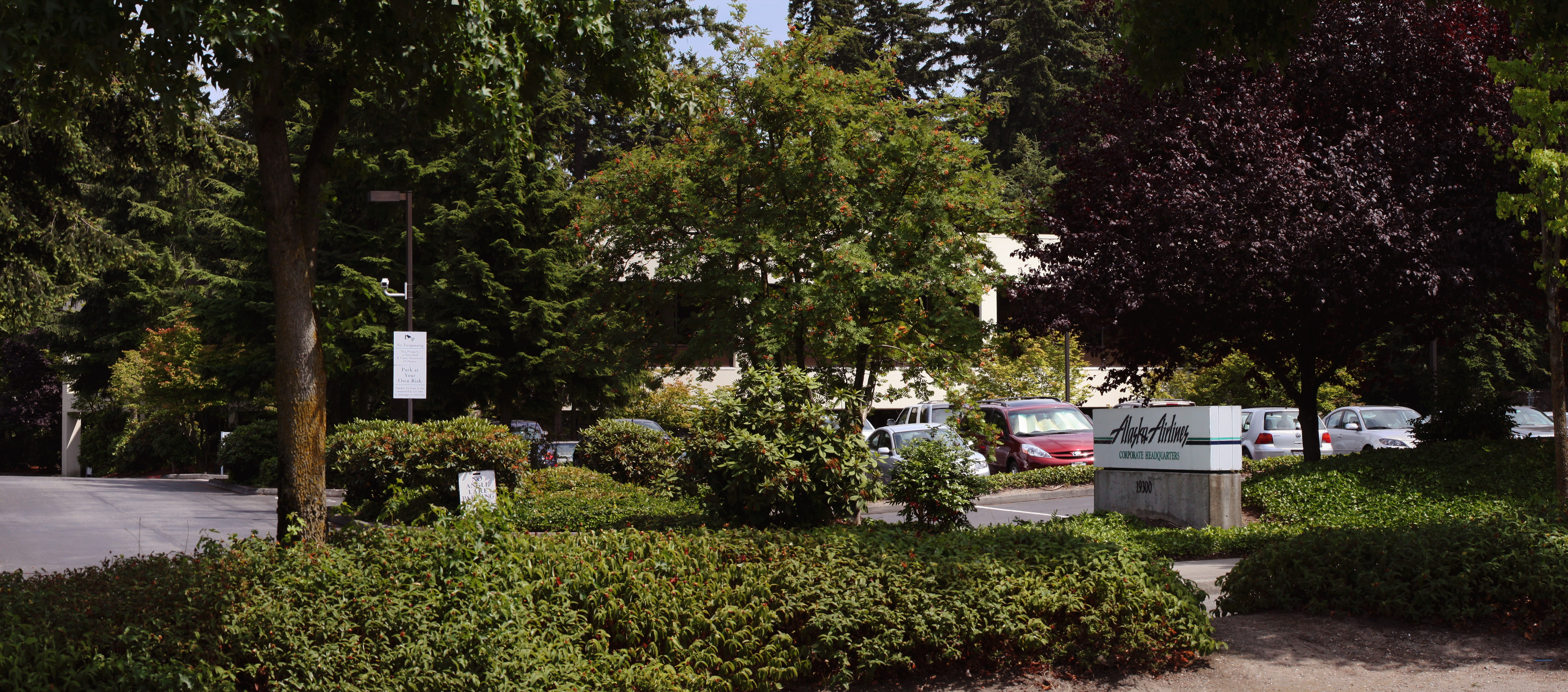
Alaska Airlines headquarters in SeaTac

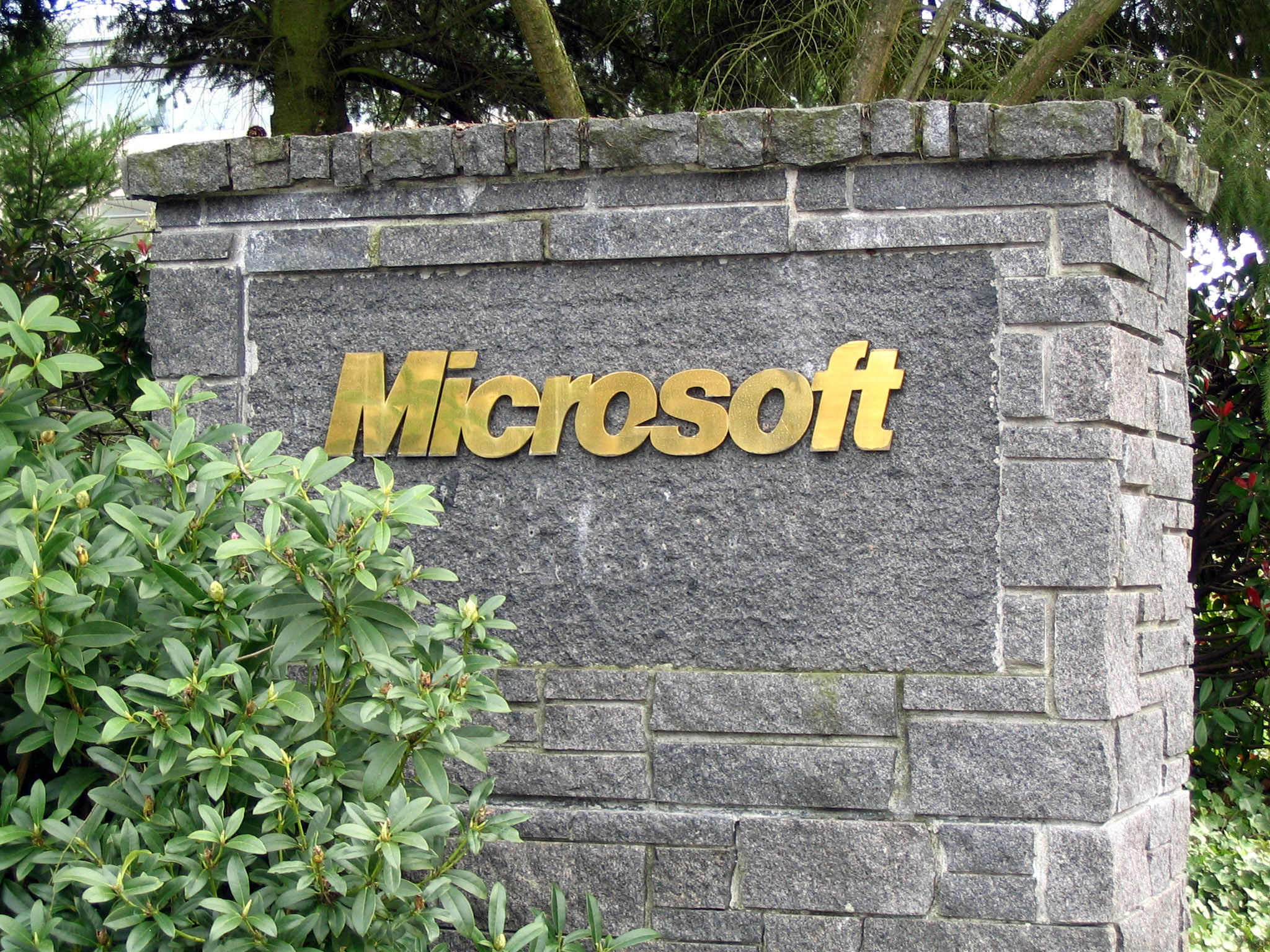
Microsoft headquarters in Redmond

Other large or well-known interstate or international companies popularly associated with Seattle are actually based in other Puget Sound cities:

- Alaska Air Group, Alaska Airlines, and Horizon Air – SeaTac
- ArenaNet – Bellevue
- BECU – Tukwila
- Blue Origin – Kent
- Bungie – Bellevue
- Classmates.com – Renton
- Clearwire – Bellevue
- Concur Technologies – Bellevue
- Costco – Issaquah (founded in Seattle)
- drugstore.com – Bellevue
- Eddie Bauer – Bellevue (founded in Seattle)
- eNom – Kirkland
- Expedia Group – Seattle (moved HQ from Bellevue to Seattle)
- Fluke Corporation – Everett
- Funko – Everett
- INRIX – Kirkland
- Intelius – Bellevue
- Kymeta – Redmond
- Microsoft – Redmond
- msnbc.com – Redmond
- MulvannyG2 Architecture – Bellevue
- Nintendo of America – Redmond
- Oberto Sausage Company – Kent
- Outerwall (formerly Coinstar) – Bellevue
- Paccar – Bellevue
- Premera Blue Cross – Mountlake Terrace
- Puget Sound Energy – Bellevue
- Raleigh USA – Kent
- REI – Kent (founded in Seattle)
- Savers/Value Village – Bellevue
- SOG Specialty Knives – Lynnwood
- Sucker Punch Productions – Bellevue
- T-Mobile US – Bellevue
- Talking Rain – Preston
- Valve – Bellevue
- Wizards of the Coast – Renton

== Companies formerly headquartered in Seattle ==
- Airborne Express (ground operations acquired by DHL, Plantation, Florida; air operations spun off as ABX Air, Wilmington, Ohio)
- Associated Grocers (acquired by Unified Western Grocers of Los Angeles)
- Boeing (now in Crystal City, Virginia)
- The Bon Marché (owned by Macy's, Inc., Cincinnati, Ohio; name changed to Bon-Macy's in 2003; rebranded as Macy's in 2005)
- Cinnabon (acquired by FOCUS Brands, Inc., Atlanta, Georgia)
- Corixa – immunotherapeutics, closed in 2006
- Costco (now in Issaquah, Washington)
- Eddie Bauer (now in Bellevue, Washington)
- Ernst Home Centers (liquidated following unsuccessful bankruptcy filing in 1996)
- Frederick & Nelson (went out of business in 1992)
- Group Health Cooperative (acquired by Kaiser Permanente in 2017)
- Immunex (acquired by Amgen, Thousand Oaks, California)
- Muzak (now in Fort Mill, South Carolina)
- MyLackey.com (defunct)
- Rainier Brewing Company (now owned by Pabst Brewing Company, Milwaukee, Wisconsin)
- Red Robin Gourmet Burgers (now in Greenwood Village, Colorado)
- REI (now in Kent, Washington)
- Safeco (acquired by Liberty Mutual)
- Seafirst Bank (acquired by Bank of America)
- Shurgard Storage Centers (acquired by Public Storage)
- Speakeasy, Inc. (acquired by Best Buy in 2007 and merged with MegaPath in 2010)
- Surreal Software (acquired by Midway Games)
- UPS (now in Sandy Springs, Georgia)
- Washington Mutual (failed in 2008, acquired by JPMorgan Chase)
- World Vision (now in Federal Way, Washington)
- Zulily (acquired by Liberty Interactive)
