= Lars Nielsen =

Lars Nielsen may refer to:

- Lars Nielsen (engineer) (born 1955), Swedish engineer
- Lars Nielsen (rower) (born 1960), Danish rower

== See also ==
- Lars Arendt-Nielsen (born 1958), professor at Aalborg University
- Lars Fjeldsoe-Nielsen (born 1973), Danish-Portuguese venture capitalist
- Lars Nilsson (disambiguation)
