= Ward's =

American organization

Ward's is an American organization that has covered the automotive industry for over a century.

The organization is responsible for several publications including, Ward's AutoWorld, and Ward's Dealer Business. Ward's also publish the annual list of Ward's 10 Best Engines.

== Ward's AutoWorld ==
Ward's AutoWorld is an automobile trade magazine. It has been published since 1924, originally as Cram Report, and continues into modern times with a monthly print version (Ward's AutoWorld), twice-monthly newsletters (Ward's Automotive Reports and Ward's Engine and Vehicle Technology Update), and subscription website.

== Acquisitions ==
Ward's was acquired by International Thomson Publishing in 1981 and sold to K-III (now Rent Group) in 1990.

Prism Business Media acquired Ward's from Primedia in 2005; Penton merged with Prism in 2006. Penton was acquired by Informa in 2016.

== See also ==
- CarDomain
