= Snapvine =

Seattle, Washington startup

Snapvine was a Seattle, Washington startup company that specialized in providing voice-over-IP features for the users of social networks. The company was founded in 2005 by Joe Heitzeberg, who was the CEO of the company.

In 2006, the company raised $2 million from the venture capital firms Draper Fisher Jurvetson and First Round Capital. Russell Siegelman, a partner in the Kleiner Perkins Caufield & Byers and former Microsoft executive, personally invested in the company and sat on its board of directors. In July 2006, the company had six employees, 20,000 users, and had recently moved its headquarters to Belltown, Seattle.

In 2007, Snapvine raised $10 million from the venture capital firm Bridgescale Partners. In September 2007, the company had grown to 18 employees, and its product had five million downloads on Myspace, Facebook, Bebo, Hi5. Celebrities 50 Cent, Enrique Iglesias, and Vanessa Hudgens used Snapvine on their Myspace pages. Its software widget was used in 200 social networks, and its voice player was invoked 22 million daily by users accessing their accounts. Snapvine monetized its product by selling banner ads, as well as voice ads users must hear as a prerequisite to making and sending their own recordings to other social media users. According to TechCrunch, the company's competitors in 2007 were SayNow, Jangl, and Jaxtr.

After experiencing a viral growth among Myspace users, the company was acquired by the company Whitepages for $20 million in 2008. Whitepages founder and CEO Alex Algard said he intended to combine Snapvine's functionality with Whitepages, a site people used to obtain the contact information of people with whom they have lost contact. Algard hoped that when people searched for themselves online, they would find their Whitepages profile. They could then substitute their phone numbers with newly created Snapvine voicemail accounts, allowing users not to have to disclose their phone numbers. The majority of Snapvine's 25 employees were expected to join Whitepages at Whitepages' Seattle office after the acquisition.

Snapvine ceased its operations on March 31, 2010.
