= Curry Up Now =

Fast casual food chain, California

- Type: Fast casual restaurant
- Industry: Food
- Founded: 2009; 17 years ago
- Headquarters: California, USA
- Area served: United States
- Key people: Rana Kapoor, Akash Kapoor, Amir Hosseini
- Website: curryupnow.com

Curry Up Now is an Indian fast casual food brand based in San Francisco, California, United States. It was founded by Rana Kapoor and Akash Kapoor in 2009.

== History ==
Rana Kapoor and Akash Kapoor, the husband-wife duo, founded Curry Up Now in 2009 as a food truck in Burlingame, California. The first brick and mortar retail store was opened in 2011 in San Mateo, followed by Palo Alto, San Francisco, San Jose, Oakland and Alameda. Curry Up Now is a fast-casual Indian street food chain; their signature popular dishes are the tikka masala burritos and the naughty naan. Their centralized kitchen is located in the San Francisco Bay area.

Curry Up has restaurants located in San Francisco, San Mateo, Palo Alto, San Jose, and La Jolla. They have franchise locations in Atlanta, Georgia; Flower Mound, Texas; Durham, North Carolina; Birmingham, Alabama; and Smyrna, Tennessee. Amir Hosseini is the co-founder and vice-president of Operations. It was a 2018 Breakout Brand of Nation's Restaurant News and acquired Tava Kitchen in 2017. Curry Up Now received investments from Kitchen Fund in 2017 and from Joe Montana backed Liquid 2 Ventures in 2020. It was in the 2019 list of Inc 5000 Fastest Growing Private Companies and appeared in basketball player Stephen Curry's 5 Minutes from Home YouTube series the same year. It was also featured in season 2 of the TV show Ugly Delicious in 2020.
