= Bernard P. Chang =

American emergency physician, psychologist, researcher, and entrepreneur

- Born: Bernard Peihsi Chang
- Education: Cornell University (AB); Harvard University (PhD, residency); Stanford University (MD); University of Oxford (EMBA)
- Occupations: Emergency physician; Psychologist; Researcher; Entrepreneur
- Employer: Columbia University
- Organizations: Academy of Behavioral Medicine Research; New York Academy of Medicine
- Known for: Emergency medicine
- Board member of: American College of Physicians (New York chapter

Bernard P. Chang is an American emergency physician, psychologist, researcher, and entrepreneur. He holds several roles at Columbia University, including Vice Chair of Research in the Department of Emergency Medicine, Tushar Shah and Zion Endowed Associate Professor in Emergency Medicine, Associate Director for the Irving Institute for Clinical and Translational Research, and Associate Director of TRANSFORM. He is also the Associate Dean of Faculty Health and Research Career Development at Columbia University's Vagelos College of Physicians and Surgeons.

As a researcher at the Columbia University Irving Medical Center, Chang's research has concerned stroke risk among various demographics like young women and veterans; he also researched mental health outcomes resulting from the COVID-19 pandemic and investigated the possibility of using machine learning algorithms to better predict and intervene in suicidal thoughts and behaviors.

Chang is also the co-founder of the digital wellness app, Mighty Health, alongside James Li and Felipe Lopes. The app has been backed by Y Combinator and several firms.

== Early life and education ==
Chang attended Cornell University and graduated magna cum laude with a BA in psychology; he also became a member of Phi Beta Kappa. Chang then received a PhD in psychology at Harvard University as well as an MD from Stanford University. Afterward, Chang completed a residency in emergency medicine at Brigham and Women's Hospital and Massachusetts General Hospital.

In 2023, Chang attended the University of Oxford's Saïd Business School and earned an Executive MBA. He had decided to go back to school for business in order to gain new skills in business and leadership to further his impact in healthcare. There, he co-founded the Healthcare Innovator Network, a group designed to unite doctors and scientists with entrepreneurs through programming such as lectures, panels, and networking events. Poets & Quants named him one of the Best and Brightest Executive MBAs of 2024.

== Career ==
At Columbia University, Chang was appointed to be the Associate Dean of Faculty Health and Research Career Development at the Vagelos College of Physicians and Surgeons in October 2023. He was also appointed to be the Associate Director for the Irving Institute for Clinical and Translational Research, as well as the Associate Director of TRANSFORM, an institutional resource for education and training. Chang additionally serves as the Vice Chair of Research in the Department of Emergency Medicine, and the Tushar Shah and Zion Endowed Associate Professor in Emergency Medicine.

Chang is also elected to the Academy of Behavioral Medicine Research and the New York Academy of Medicine. He additionally serves on the board of directors at the New York state chapter of the American College of Physicians. He formerly served as a member on the Alumni Board of Governors at Stanford University Medical Center.

Chan has led and/or helped with over 70 articles regarding stroke risk, post-traumatic stress disorder, suicidal thoughts and behaviors, and other topics in emergency medicine and psychology. Nine of his studies have been supported by the National Institutes of Health (NIH). He ranks in the top 10 highest funded scientists in emergency medicine by NIH dollars. He was also the youngest-ever doctor of emergency medicine to receive "a top-tier NIH grant".

=== Mental health research ===
In 2017, Chang co-authored a study on suicidal thoughts and behaviors (STBs) which analyzed 50 years of studies regarding possible risk factors for STBs; specifically, 365 studies were investigated. The study found that the current scholarship "were not good predictors of suicide" and that even the most informed predictions based upon it were no better than a coin flip; it identified the problem within the current scholarship as being too based on narrowly probing individual risk factors in isolation. The researchers proposed machine learning algorithms as possible tools to analyze "hundreds of factors from a person’s health history to improve the accuracy of suicide prediction" and modernize predictions of STBs.

During the COVID-19 pandemic, Chang was working at the Columbia University Medical Center. There, he reported overwhelm among workers: "You were on high alert the whole shift. It was a brutal, sustained battle." That same year, Chang helped with an observational and cross-sectional study—spearheaded by Columbia University and the Northwest Mental Illness Research, Education and Clinical Center—involving the "prolonged physical and emotional stress" of healthcare workers, including first responders, working through overwhelming circumstances resulting from the novel Coronavirus. The study's goal was to investigate a possible relationship between Coronavirus-induced stress and psychiatric health.

The preliminary study, conducted in 2020, first involved 118 healthcare workers and first responders who were asked to self-report the proximity of COVID-19 in their lives: 31% had been knowingly or likely affected by COVID-19 themselves; 19% reported that a close family member had; 12% reported a death in their family from COVID-19; and 30% stated that they had "increased risk" of COVID-19 due to other health circumstances.

The healthcare workers and first responders were then given a PCL-5 self-report assessment, or a checklist for symptoms of post-traumatic stress disorder (PTSD). 26% reported a score high enough to indicate PTSD symptoms; 60% scored above the level indicating mild depression; 28% had scores demonstrating insomnia; 67% showed scores for mild anxiety. Some questions on the questionnaire also found that many healthcare workers and first responders indicated a decreased likelihood of wanting to stay in their profession.

In conclusion, the study saw their findings as evidence of a need to ease the conditions of healthcare workers and first responders. In 2021, the study was peer-reviewed and published in the Journal of General Internal Medicine.

=== Research on strokes ===
In 2018, Chang led and published a study proposing more efforts to better evaluate, diagnose, and treat young women—specifically defined as "premenopausal women"—with ischemic stroke, including "creating and applying clinical decision rules, educational campaigns designed to educate young women and emergency medicine providers, and consideration of preventive strategies that might be applied in the emergency department" among other potential interventions.

In 2020, Chang and Joshua Z. Willey co-authored an article in Stroke regarding hemorrhagic stroke risk in veterans. Specifically, Chang and Willey investigated "the long-term consequences in contemporary populations of PTSD on subsequent cardiovascular disease and in particular for hemorrhagic stroke, which is associated with high mortality" by following up with a cohort of United States Armed Forces veterans for as long as 13 years. The study found a statistically insignificant relationship between PTSD and selective serotonin reuptake inhibitor (SSRI) usage with increased hemorrhagic stroke risk while also questioning whether other factors like hypertension and substance use could have affected outcomes. Chang and Willey concluded that SSRIs and other pharmacological treatments should still be used if generally effective for PTSD patients, though they urged more vigilance and research into "risk factors for hemorrhagic stroke, especially in high-risk younger population".

In 2022, Chang helped author a case–control study to investigate the possible relationship between influenza-like illness (ILI) and the risk of stroke, which hadn't previously been looked at. The study took 2008–2014 data, consisting of patients aged 18–65, and made stratified groups based on age and admission date, noting whether there were ILI exposures within 30 days of admission and/or whether patients were vaccinated a year before admission. Altogether, the study examined 24,103 cases for individuals aged 18–44 and 141,811 cases aged 45–65. Ultimately, it found that ": ILI was associated with increased stroke risk in the young and middle-aged, while vaccinations of any type were associated with decreased risk among the young. Joint effects of ILI and vaccinations indicate vaccinations can reduce the effect of ILI on stroke."

=== Mighty Health ===
In 2018, Chang, James Li, and Felipe Lopes co-founded the technology company, Mighty Health, which serves as a digital wellness app combining features of exercise, health, and nutrition. Specifically, it is tailored toward the health needs and considerations of older individuals; the Los Angeles Times called it:

... the first exercise, nutrition and wellness app designed specifically for people over 50. Featuring personalized nutrition plans, low-impact exercises, and one-on-one guidance from doctors, occupational therapists and coaches, it can help seniors reduce joint pain, improve mobility and lose weight... Mighty Health includes the option to engage with a supportive community of fellow users and tips for adult children caring for aging parents.

Mighty Health was backed by Y Combinator in 2019. It has also received support from RRE Ventures, Liquid 2 Ventures, NextView Ventures, Soma Capital, and other venture capital firms. In 2023, it received $7.6 million in seed funding from Will Ventures and GFT Ventures.

== Awards ==
- Society for Academic Emergency Medicine Early Investigator Award (2019)
- Dr. Harold and Golden Lamport Research Award (2020)
- Outstanding Researcher Award: Established Researcher (2020)
- University of Oxford Saïd Business School Executive MBA Director's Award (2023)

== Personal life ==
Chang is married to Anisa Heravian, who is also an emergency physician; they had met in 2012 while working in emergency medicine at Columbia University Irving Medical Center. They have three children.

Chang can speak six languages: English, Mandarin Chinese, Italian, Persian, French, and Spanish.
