= Hiya (company) =

Company

- Company type: Private
- Industry: Software
- Founded: 2016; 10 years ago
- Headquarters: Seattle, Washington, U.S.
- Key people: Alex Algard (CEO, founder); Kush Parikh (President)
- Website: www.hiya.com

Hiya is a Seattle-based company that provides spam and fraud call protection and identity services to more than 500 million users around the globe.

== History ==
Hiya was initially developed as a caller-ID app for Whitepages. In April 2016, Hiya was spun off from Whitepages; by that time, the Hiya app had 25 million downloads. Whitepages' founder, Alex Algard stepped down from the parent company to focus on leading Hiya, which, as of December 2020, employs 120.

In February 2016, Hiya, then part of Whitepages, reached a deal with Samsung to integrate its caller profile and spam protection services into all Galaxy S7 and Galaxy S7 edge phones in 16 countries. The company extended its partnership with Samsung in a separate deal in August 2016 to include its service on the Galaxy Note 7 and to expand the partnership to a total of 28 countries. In August 2016, Hiya launched Hiya Cloud, its network-level caller ID and call-blocking offering.

After offering only a limited version of its app for iPhones, Hiya announced in September 2016 that the full version of its app would be available on iOS 10. Soon after, Hiya began providing spam protection services to AT&T phones through the AT&T Call Protect product. In 2017, Hiya entered a similar partnership with ZTE to provide call spam protection services for all Axon 7 users.

== Funding ==
In October 2017, Hiya announced it had received its first outside funding: a Series A of $18 million led by Balderton Capital with participation from Nautilus Venture Partners and Lumia Capital. Hiya said it would use the funds to expand globally. Following the investment, Balderton’s Lars Fjeldsoe-Nielsen, an early executive at Uber and Dropbox, joined Hiya’s board.

== Partnerships ==
In November 2023, Hiya partnered with Liberty Latin America for spam and fraud protection.

In February 2024, Hiya partnered with Virgin Media O2 to work together on AI-powered spam and fraud protection.

Samsung has extended its strategic partnership with Hiya through 2025 to automatically block fraud calls on the new Galaxy Note20.

== Features ==
Users can report numbers associated with unwanted calls through the app as well as block future calls from certain phone numbers.
