= Sabeer Bhatia =

Indian-American businessman, co-founder of Hotmail

- Born: 30 December 1968 (age 57); Chandigarh, India
- Education: BITS Pilani (drop out); Caltech (BS); Stanford University (MS)
- Occupation: Entrepreneur
- Known for: Hotmail.com
- Spouse: Tanya Sharma (m. 2008; div. 2013)
- Children: 3

Sabeer Bhatia (born 30 December 1968) is an Indian-American entrepreneur who co-founded the first free web-based email service, Hotmail.com (now Outlook.com) in 1996. In 2021 he co-founded ShowReel with Javed Yunus. ShowReel initially hosted short videos for job seekers and founders. It has since turned into an AI-based entrepreneurship course.

== Early life and education ==
Bhatia was born in Chandigarh on 30 December 1968, to Baldev Bhatia and Daman Bhatia in a Sindhi family. His father was a captain in the Indian Army, and his mother was working at the Central Bank of India.

Bhatia studied at The Bishop's School, Pune. He then studied at St. Joseph's Boys' High School, Bengaluru, and St. Joseph's Pre-University College, Bengaluru. In 1985, he enrolled at BITS Pilani, where he studied for two years before earning a highly competitive transfer scholarship to the California Institute of Technology to complete his bachelor’s degree in electrical engineering. He then attended Stanford University, where he obtained his master’s degree in electrical engineering.

== Career ==
Bhatia briefly worked for Apple Inc, as a hardware engineer and Firepower Systems Inc. He, along with his colleague Jack Smith, set up Hotmail on 4 July 1996, American Independence Day, symbolizing "freedom" from ISP-based e-mail and the ability to access a user's inbox from anywhere in the world.

As president and CEO, Bhatia led Hotmail until its eventual acquisition by Microsoft in 1998 for an estimated $400 million.

Bhatia started a free messaging service called JaxtrSMS. He said that JaxtrSMS would do to SMS what Hotmail did for e-mail. Claiming it to be a disruptive technology, he says that the operators will lose revenue on the reduced number of SMSes on their network but will benefit from the data plan that the user has to buy. To date, JaxtrSMS service has failed to replicate the success of Hotmail.

In 2006, Sabeer proposed the construction of "Nano City", a city that would be similar to Silicon Valley in northern India. It was approved by the state government of Haryana in September. By 2010, no progress had been made; the project was cancelled by the HSIIDC later that year.

Recently, he invested in email collaboration software, ccZen and another e-commerce technology provider E-junkie.

== Personal life ==
Bhatia married Tanya Sharma in 2008 and they have a daughter Ariana. Later, they filed for divorce in January 2013 in a court in San Francisco, citing "irreconcilable differences".
