= Panopto =

American multinational computer technology corporation

- Trade name: Panopto Inc.
- Type: Private
- Industry: Computer software, Enterprise software, Education software
- Founded: 2007; 19 years ago
- Founders: William Guttman; William Scherlis; Brad Winney; Eric Burns
- Headquarters: Pittsburgh, Pennsylvania, United States
- Area served: Worldwide
- Key people: Stephen Laster (CEO); Amy Clark (COO); Andrew Herning (CFO)
- Parent: K1 Investment Management, LLC
- Website: www.panopto.com

Panopto is an American multinational technology corporation headquartered in Pittsburgh, Pennsylvania. Panopto provides software for universities, training organizations and enterprise businesses to advance visual and auditory learning.

Panopto's software is commonly used to advance knowledge dissemination through the creation of interactive visual and auditory learning segments based on lecture and meeting recording, avatar enabled video from flat content, screencasting, video streaming, and deep integration with Learning Management Systems and Learning Experience Platforms.

Panopto serves as a system of record for video and curated visual content via its video content management software, and is often used in remote work, e-learning, and corporate training and development environments.

The company was founded as a spinout of Carnegie Mellon University (CMU) in 2007 by two of its professors, William Guttman and William Scherlis, in addition to Eric Burns and Brad Winney.

In 2021, Panopto was acquired by K1 Investment Management, a private equity firm in California.

In October 2024, Panopto acquired Elai, an AI text-to-video platform that enables the creation of video content from static content using custom avatars and voice cloning technology. The acquisition, which won "Best M&A Deal Under $20M" in EdTech Chronicle's 2024 Best in Education Awards, expanded Panopto's capabilities in generative AI-powered content creation to drive more efficient and effective learning.

== History ==
According to Burns, the idea for the company came to the founders in 2002 as the cost of storing video images on computer became cheaper than storing the same footage on videotape. Winney, as the founding CEO, and Guttman formally incorporated the company in 2007. Winney spearheaded the 'Socrates Project' whereby the company provided the software for free but charged for support. The company quickly signed up over 400 major universities (largely in the U.S.) allowing it to compete effectively with larger and better capitalized companies such as Echo 360 and Sonic Foundry. Panopto software has, since that point, offered the recording of university lectures and business presentations, the streaming of live events, the managing of video libraries, the capability of video search, and other knowledge management services.

By 2008 over 100,000 lectures had been viewed via Panopto lecture capturing technology. In 2009 the company announced that it had partnered with Moodle's open source project to provide its lecture capturing software to over twenty million users worldwide. In 2010 Macmillan Publishers announced a partnership with Panopto to produce a software called Panopto Fusion, which allowed individual professors to utilize lecture capture software if their institutions had not yet partnered with the company. In 2011, Pearson Education announced it would sell Panopto products to its customer base. In addition to its lecture capturing software Focus, the company also offers tools that allow videos to be searched, viewed, and edited on the Internet.

In early 2011 Panopto raised $4 million from a consortium of 17 investors. By the end of the year, it had signed licensing agreements with 400 separate universities globally. In 2012 the company released an iOS app version of its software allowing students to utilize its media software on iPhones and iPads to record media and submit the recordings as assignments. An additional product capability called Unison was released in 2011 that allowed the uploading of existing video into Panopto's media library. The software is also compatible with IMS Global Learning Consortium cross-platform incorporation tools, specifically with the university standard software integration program Learning Tools Interoperability. According to Professor Michael Weston of the University of Houston–Victoria, Panopto was helpful when it came to athletes or other students that were required to miss classes in order to take care of other responsibilities. Meanwhile, other professors have integrated the software directly into their courses in a process of blended learning.

In 2015 Eric Burns became the company's CEO, as previous CEO William Guttman became the Executive Chairman of the company. Burns had served as Chief Product Officer since the company's founding. Burns had led the Seattle office of Panopto, which eventually overtook the Pittsburgh headquarters of the firm as the company's main centre of business. The company had about 500 institutional clients at this point, including universities that outfit each classroom with Panopto technology.

In August 2016, Panopto raised $42.8 million in new funding led by Sterling Partners. In February 2017, Panopto expanded Seattle HQ with room for 100 employees after it set records for active users, revenue, and renewals in 2016.

In November 2022, Jason Beem took the role of CEO.

== Features ==
As of 2012, Panopto offered two units of software: Focus and Unison. Focus is software that records and live-streams presentations, lectures, demos, and so forth, and then stores them in the Panopto video content management system (CMS). Unison is software that imports existing videos into the Panopto video CMS. Both come with the web-based content management system, a web-based media editor, the ability to search within videos, and developer APIs for integrating Panopto with existing content- and learning-management systems.

In 2015 Panopto upgraded its software to allow video capture and embedding in Salesforce. It has also done research and development into video web search, including mass video search for university video libraries.

The company introduced Panopto Express, a free online screen recording tool in May 2020. The tool was designed to make it easy for people to record lectures and presentations and upload those videos to YouTube or Google Classroom.

In November 2020, Panopto's business meeting intelligence service is now connected with Cisco Webex Meetings. Users can use it to browse and exchange records on a scale within companies and in both virtual and physical environments.

The company announced that university students watched over three billion minutes of video on Panopto in fall 2020.
