= Whitepages (company) =

American directory services company

- Company type: Private
- Website type: Contact Data
- Founded: 1997; 29 years ago, in Stanford, California, U.S.
- Headquarters: Seattle, Washington, U.S.
- Country of origin: United States
- Area served: United States
- Founder: Alex Algard
- Key people: Leigh McMillan, CEO (2019–present)
- Industry: Information Technology; Search Engines
- Products: Whitepages Premium; Whitepages People Search (mobile app); Whitepages Reverse Phone Lookup (mobile app); SmartCheck; Speed Search; Whitepages Property Intel; Whitepages Pro API
- Services: People search Reverse phone lookup Reverse address lookup Property owner search Background check Contact enrichment Identity verification Property data analysis Data access via APIs
- Employees: 32 (2019)
- Website: www.whitepages.com
- Current status: Active

Whitepages is an American provider of online directory services, fraud screening, background checks, identity verification, property data analysis, and data access via APIs for consumers and businesses. It has the largest database available of contact information on residents of the United States.

Whitepages was founded in 1997 as a hobby for then-Stanford student Alex Algard. It was incorporated in 2000 and received $45 million in funding in 2005. Investors were later bought-out by Algard in 2013. From 2008 to 2013, Whitepages released several mobile apps, a re-design in 2009, the ability for consumers to control their contact information, and other features. From 2010 to 2016, the company shifted away from advertising revenue and began focusing more on selling business services and subscription products.

== History ==
=== Founding ===
The idea for Whitepages was conceived by Alex Algard, while studying at Stanford in 1996. Algard was searching for a friend's contact information, and the phone company gave him the wrong number. He thought of an online email directory as an easier way to find people. Algard bought the Whitepages.com domain for $900, which he says was all of his savings at the time. He continued operating the website as a hobby while working as an investment banker for Goldman Sachs. He expanded the database of contact information using data licensed from American Business Information (now a part of Infogroup). Eventually, Whitepages was producing more ad-revenue than Algard was earning at Goldman Sachs. In 1998, Algard left his job to focus on the website; he incorporated Whitepages in 2000.

=== Growth ===
The site grew and attracted more advertisers. The company brokered deals with Yellowpages and Superpages, whereby Whitepages earned revenue for sending them referral traffic. By 2005, $15 million in annual revenues was coming from these contracts. In 2003, Algard stepped down as CEO to focus on CarDomain.com, which he had also founded and Max Bardon took his place as CEO temporarily. In 2005, Technology Crossover Ventures and Providence Equity Partners invested $45 million in the company. That same year, MSN adopted Whitepages' directory data for its "Look it up" feature. Algard returned to the company in 2007. By the end of that year, the Whitepages database had grown to 180 million records and the company was listed as one of Deloitte's 500 fastest growing technology companies in North America three times. By 2008 the company had $66 million in annual revenues.

In 2008, Whitepages said it would start working on options for users to control their information on the site. That same year, it acquired VoIP developer Snapvine in order to add features where users could be called through the website without giving out their phone number. It also introduced an api, which gave third-party developers access to Whitepages' data. Whitepages released an iOS app that August, followed by the Whitepages Caller ID app for Android devices in February 2009 and for Blackberry that May.

The app displayed information on callers, such as their latest social media posts, local weather at the caller's location and the identity of the caller. The ability for consumers to add themselves to the directory was added in the summer of 2009 and being able to edit existing entries was added that October.

Whitepages.com underwent a re-design in 2009. According to VentureBeat reporter Matt Marshall, the redesign made the advertising "cleaner" and made it more obvious when someone was going to a third-party website like US Search. Marshall had previously criticized Whitepages, because website users that clicked on US Search ads and purchased data from US Search were sent through perpetual advertisements for other services that made it difficult to access the information they paid for. A local business lookup feature called "Store Finder" was added in June 2010. The following month, Whitepages.com launched a deal site, Dealpop.com, which differed from Groupon by offering short-term deals on nationally available products. Dealpop was sold to Tippr the following year.

In 2010, Superpages and Yellowpages cut back spending with Whitepages from $33 million to $7 million, causing a substantial decline in revenues and a tense relationship with investors. Algard spent $50 million in cash the company had on-hand and $30 million from a bank loan, to buyout the investors in 2013. He also used his personal house, savings account and personal belongings as collateral for the loan. Algard began shifting the company's business model to reduce its reliance on advertising and instead focus on business users and paid subscriptions.

Whitepages released the Localicious app in July 2011. The app was released on Android first, because Whitepages was frustrated with Apple's approval process for iPhone apps. Whitepages PRO was also introduced that same year. An updated Android app called Current Caller ID was released in August 2012. Within a year of its release, 5 billion calls and texts had been transmitted using the app. It was updated in July 2013 with new features, such as the ability to customize the layout of caller information for each caller and the ability to "like" Facebook posts from within the app. In June 2013, Whitepages acquired Mr. Number, an Android app for blocking unwanted callers.

In August 2013 Whitepages purchased all the interests in the company owned by investors for $80 million. In 2015, Whitepages acquired San Francisco-based NumberCop to improve the database of phone numbers used for scams in the Caller ID app. In April 2016, Whitepages spun-off its caller ID business into a separate company called Hiya with a staff of 40 in Seattle. In September 2016, Alex Algard stepped down as CEO of Whitepages, in order to focus on the mobile spam-blocking spin-off Hiya. He appointed Rob Eleveld as the new Whitepages CEO. In June 2019, Whitepages split into two companies, spinning out its enterprise business as Ekata. Leigh McMillan, previously general manager of the consumer business, became chief executive officer of Whitepages.

In December 2024, Whitepages launched Whitepages Property Intel, a real estate intelligence platform that combines its people database with nationwide residential property records.

In August 2025, Whitepages launched the Whitepages Pro API, providing developers with programmatic access to its identity and property datasets for use in identity verification, fraud prevention, and property intelligence.

== Privacy ==
As of August 2020, users can remove their information from Whitepages by following the tutorial on Whitepages homepage.

Whitepages and similar services have been criticized because of the danger caused by listing the personal information and physical addresses of unwitting people openly online, and for profiting off the exploitation of personal data.

Whitepages states that it promotes responsible data practices and transparency in how its information is used to support privacy and safety across its services.

== Lawsuits ==
On February 1, 2017, Kevin Klingler, identified only as a resident of Illinois, filed suit in Cook County Circuit Court, alleging the behavior of Seattle-based Whitepages violates the Illinois Right of Publicity Law.

== Products and services ==
Whitepages has the largest database of contact information on Americans. The Whitepages Identity Graph spans 350 million identity records and 112 million property records nationwide. The database draws on property deeds, telecom companies, and public records. Privacy is a common concern regarding Whitepages' publishing of personal contact information. The Whitepages.com website has features that allow users to remove themselves from the directory.

Whitepages started developing features for business users around 2010. Whitepages Pro is used for things like verifying the identity of a sales lead, find fake form data in online forms and to check form data from consumers making a purchase against common indicators of fraud, like shipping to a mailbox at an unoccupied building. In 2016, advertising on Whitepages.com was turned off in favor of selling monthly subscriptions that give users access to background checks and other records.

In December 2024, the company introduced Whitepages Property Intel, a real estate intelligence platform that combines Whitepages’ contact information with property data to help real estate professionals and investors evaluate properties.

In August 2025, Whitepages launched the Whitepages Pro API, which provides programmatic access to identity and property datasets via RESTful endpoints. Developers use the API for people search, reverse lookups, contact data enrichment, and fraud prevention. The API is distinct from the early Whitepages Pro enterprise product.

Whitepages provides its data and related services through multiple web properties and mobile apps, including 411.com, PeopleSearch.com, Switchboard.com and Whitepages Property Intel. It also offers two mobile apps: Whitepages People Search (iOS / Android) for address and phone look-ups, and Whitepages Reverse Phone (iOS / Android) for identifying unknown callers.

The Hiya app (previously known as Whitepages Caller ID) checks incoming calls against a database of phone numbers known for spam or scam calls and helps users report scams to the Federal Trade Commission. Hiya mobile app replaces the Android user interface for making and receiving phone calls.

== Awards and recognition ==
- In 2021, Whitepages, Inc. ranked 28th among small employers (15–49 Washington employees) on Washington’s Best Companies to Work For list.
- In 2022, Whitepages, Inc. ranked 9th among small employers (15–49 Washington employees) on Washington’s Best Companies to Work For list.
- In 2023, Whitepages, Inc. ranked 14th among small employers (15–49 Washington employees) on Washington’s Best Companies to Work For list.
- In 2024, Whitepages, Inc. ranked 6th among small employers (15–49 Washington employees) on Washington’s Best Companies to Work For list.
- In 2025, Whitepages, Inc. ranked 3rd among small employers (1–49 full-time Washington employees) on Washington's Best Companies to Work For list.
