= Langeskov =

- Town
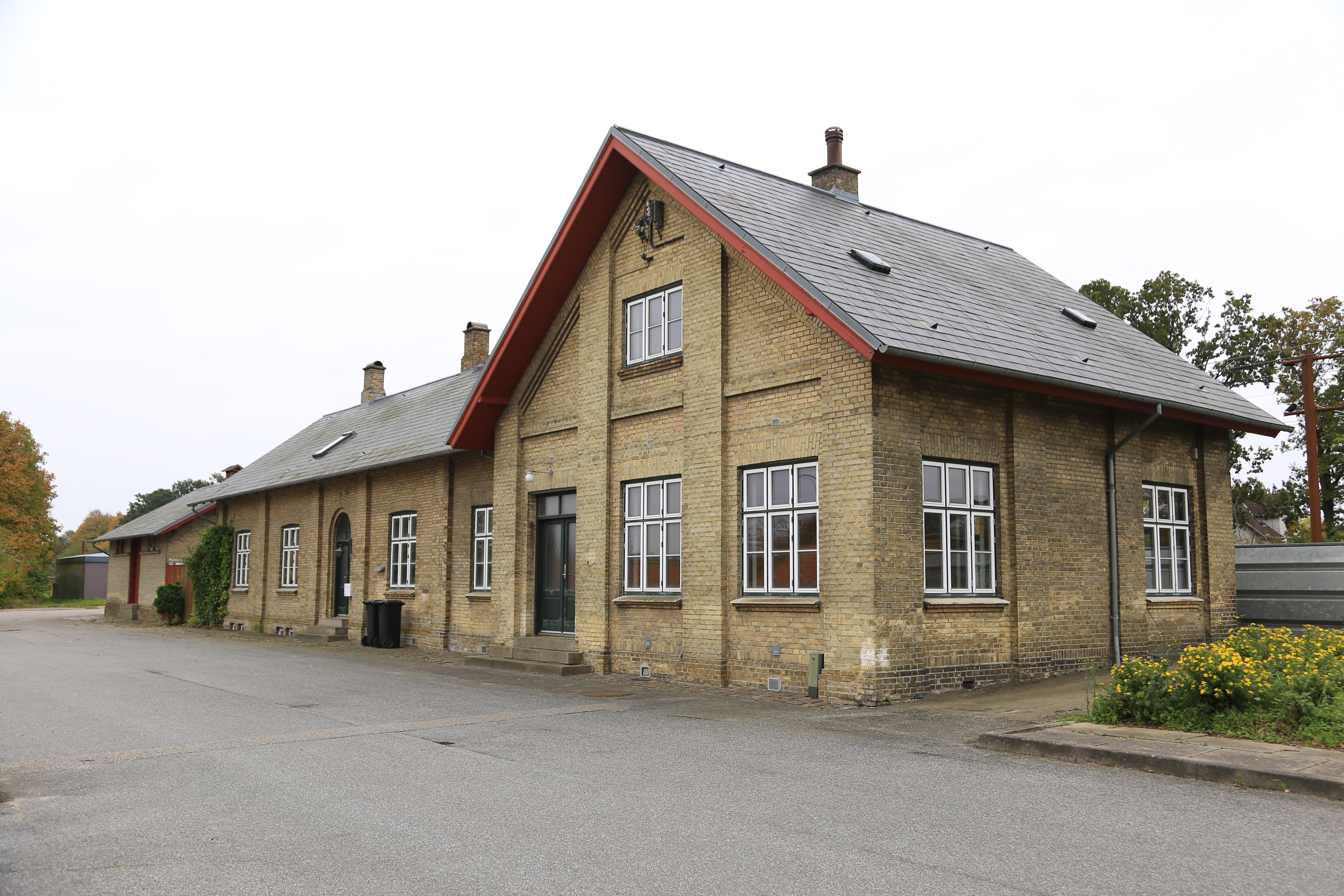
- The old Langeskov railway station, closed in 1977

- Location in Denmark Langeskov (Region of Southern Denmark)
- Coordinates: 55°21′28″N 10°35′8″E
- Country: Denmark
- Region: Southern Denmark
- Municipality: Kerteminde

Area
  - Urban: 3.2 km^{2} (1.2 sq mi)

Population (2026)
  - Urban: 4,458
  - Urban density: 1,400/km^{2} (3,600/sq mi)
  - Gender: 2,205 males and 2,253 females
- Time zone: UTC+1 (CET)
  - Summer (DST): UTC+2 (CEST)
- Postal code: DK-5550 Langeskov

Langeskov is a town in central Denmark, with a population of 4,458 (1 January 2026), located in Kerteminde Municipality in Region of Southern Denmark on the island of Funen.

The town of Langeskov is primarily located in Rønninge parish and was established following the construction of the railway line between Odense and Nyborg in the 19th century. The town has grown rapidly and its northern part now crosses the old parish border and extends into the parish of Birkende. Until 1 January 2007, it was the seat of the municipal council of the now former Langeskov Municipality.

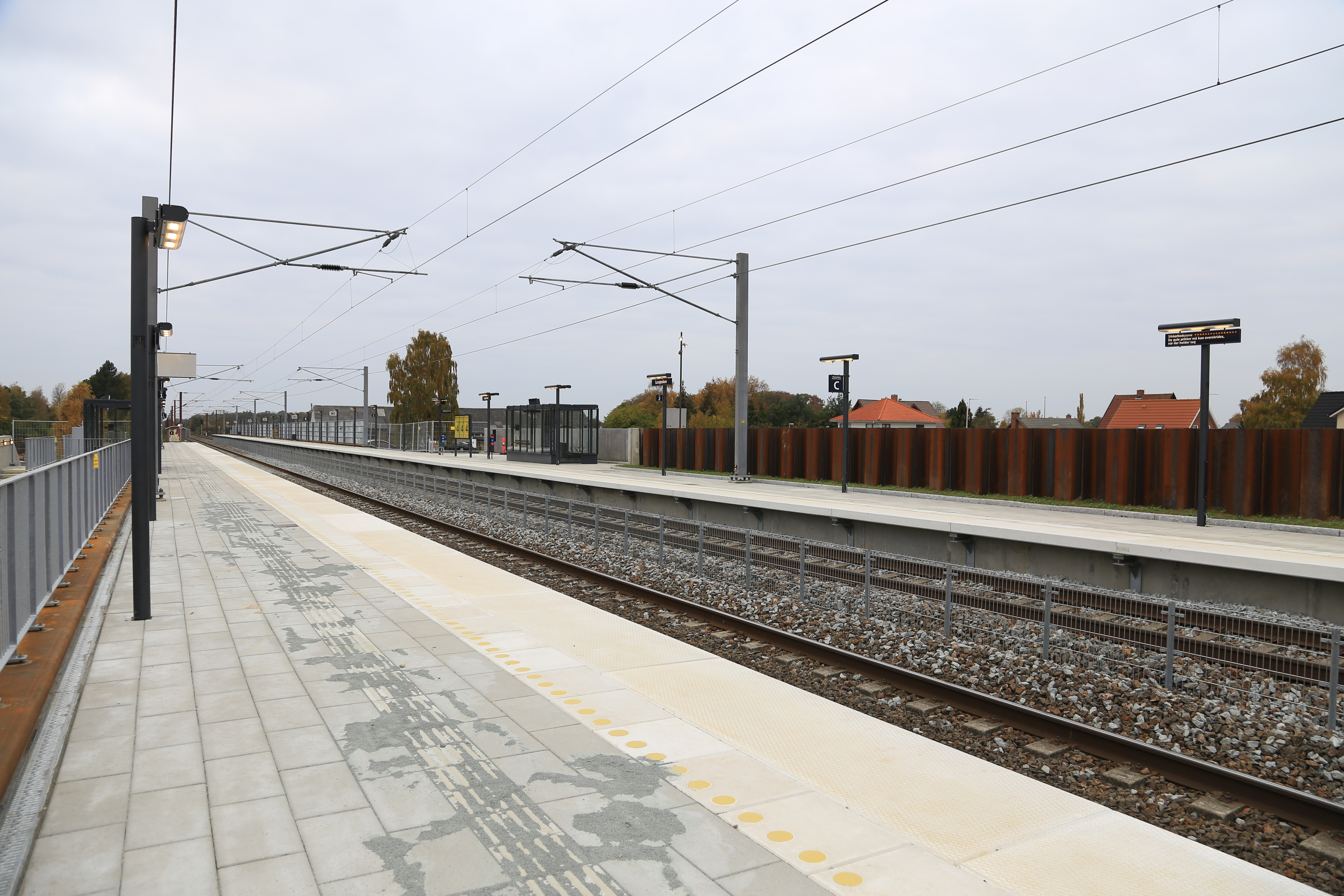
The new Langeskov railway station

Langeskov is served by Langeskov railway station on the railway line across Funen. The station re-opened in 2015 after being closed in 1977.

Langeskov has a model of Preikestolen to commemorate its Norwegian twin town of Forsand Municipality.

== Demographics ==
Year	population
2006	3,809
2007	3,893
2008	3,972
2009	4,065
2010	4,003
2011	4,023
2012	3,972

== Notable people ==
- Lars Arendt-Nielsen (born 1958 in Langeskov) a professor at Aalborg University, specialising in translational pain research
- Mathias Greve (born 1995 in Langeskov) a Danish footballer, 137 caps with Odense Boldklub
