= Lars Fjeldsoe-Nielsen =

Danish-Portuguese venture capitalist

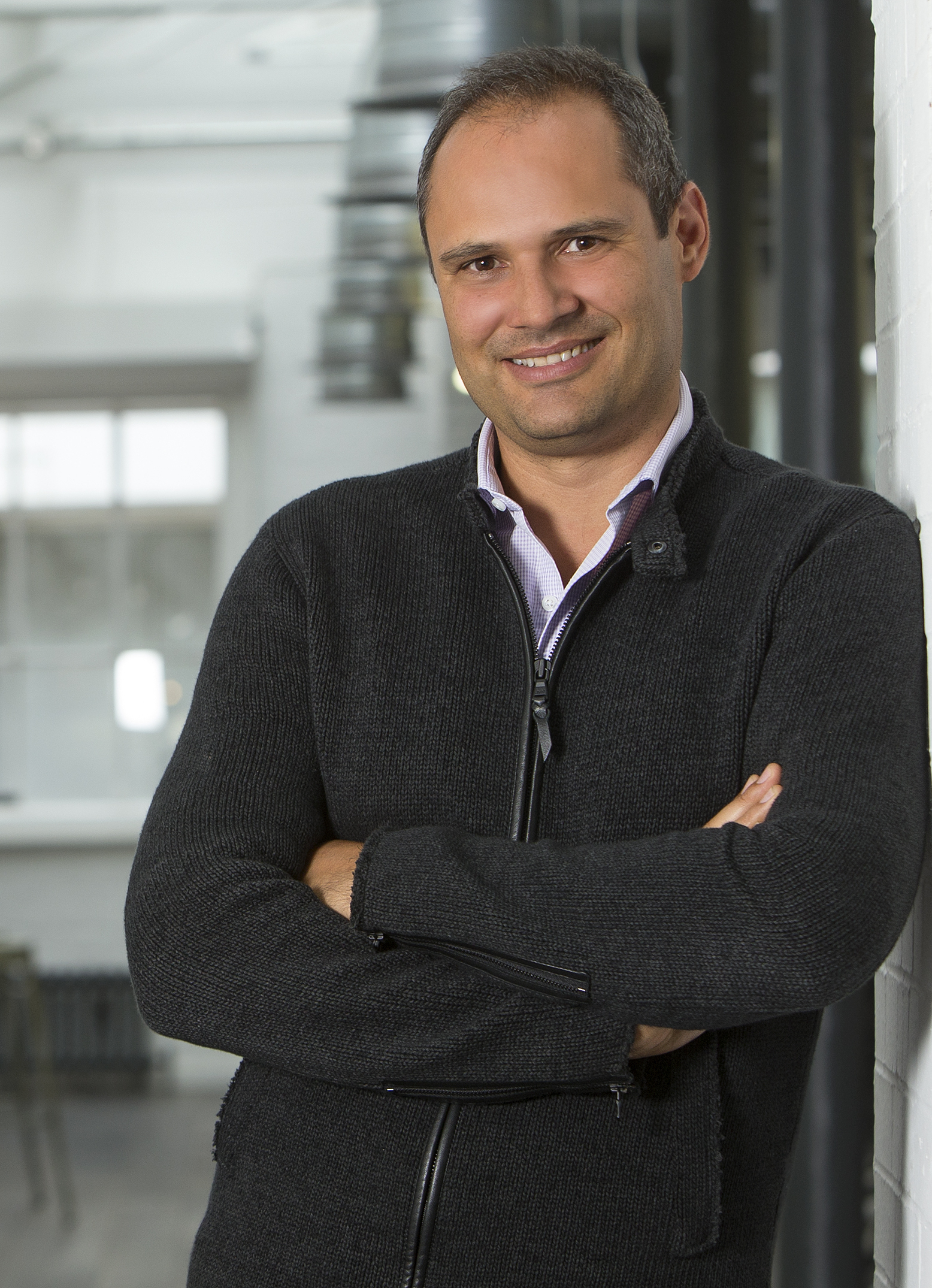
- Lars at Balderton HQ
- Born: June 1973 (age 53)
- Education: University of Oxford, London Business School
- Occupation: Venture capitalist
- Known for: General Partner at Balderton Capital and a Governor of the London Business School

Lars Fjeldsoe-Nielsen (born June 1973) is a Danish-Portuguese venture capitalist. He is a General Partner at Balderton Capital and a Governor of the London Business School.

He worked as Vice President Mobile of Uber, based in San Francisco, and served as Head of Mobile at Dropbox as well as Advisor at WhatsApp Inc. until April 2014.

== Education ==
Fjeldsoe-Nielsen graduated from the University of Oxford, UK, with an MSc in Mechanical Engineering in 1999 and received his MBA from the London Business School. He also holds a BSc in engineering from King's College London (1998).

== Career ==
Early in his career, he was Vice President of Market Development at Voicesignal Technologies Inc. Nuance acquired VoiceSignal in 2007. He went on to join 3Jam Inc., which was acquired by Skype.

Fjeldsoe-Nielsen joined Dropbox when the company had less than 30 employees. He co-invented a method for integrating services on mobile phones (United States Patent 61/705,458). In 2014, he left Dropbox to join Uber. While at Uber, he invented a method for controlling the presentation of graphics on mobile phones depending on location information (United States Patent 9615208).

He joined Balderton Capital as General Partner in 2015. In 2016, he wrote in the Financial Times about the trend of what he calls Valley Veterans returning home to Europe from Silicon Valley. His investments include Hiya, Blue Bottle Coffee, Feast Kitchen, Zycada Networks, Soundtrack Your Brand, Dubsmash, Pocket (acquired by Mozilla), Labster, e-scooter company VOI Technology, and The Org.

Fjeldsoe-Nielsen is a sponsor of the African Wildlife Conservation Fund and other initiatives focused on education in Africa.
