= Johnson Braund Design Group =

Coordinates: 47.46697°N 122.268839°W

Johnson Braund, Inc.
- Company type: Private
- Industry: Architecture, Interior Design, Urban Planning
- Founded: 1977, Seattle, Washington, U.S.
- Founder: Tom Johnson, Larry Braund
- Headquarters: Seattle, Washington, U.S.
- Area served: North America
- Key people: Greg Allwine, Principal; Jeff Williams,, Principal
- Services: Architecture; Interior Design
- Number of employees: 35 (2008)
- Website: Johnsonbraund.com

Johnson Braund, Inc. is an architecture and design firm with based out of Seattle, Washington. Firm acts as prototype designer for a number of Marriott International chains, including Residence Inn by Marriott, Courtyard by Marriott, and SpringHill Suites.

== Firm information ==
Founded as Johnson Braund Design Grounp, Inc. in 1977 by Seattle architects Tom Johnson, Larry Braund, and Greg Allwine. The firm shortened its name for Johnson Braund, Inc. in 2011. At the inception of the company, the firm began designing multi-family homes in the Seattle area, but soon branched out to cover hospitality, parks, planning and commercial design. The firm now covers projects that range across 42 states.

Notable clients include Marriott International, Hilton Hotels Corporation, InterContinental Hotels Group, Banner Bank, Habitat for Humanity, along with a number of Senior Housing Assistance Group projects in the Seattle Area.

The firm's headquarters is heralded by the EPA as being one of the nation's most efficient office structures, citing a 50% energy reduction within one year. The firm is currently certifying the building by both ENERGYSTAR and as one of the world's first LEED Platinum Existing Building O&M rating.

== Notable buildings and renovations ==
- Downtown Sacramento Residence Inn
- Hyatt Place Hotel, Seattle, WA
- Greenbridge, Habitat for Humanity, White Center, WA

== Recent awards ==
- EPA ENERGYSTAR Small Business Energy Conservation, 2008
- WRPA 'Best Park' for Washington State - 'Macadam Winter Garden Garden,' 2008
- Urban Green Council's "Ebie Awards" for building renovations. Won for highest percentage of savings of potable water and lowest possible water consumption following a renovation, 2012
