= ClearSign Technologies =

American technology company

ClearSign Technologies Corporation
- Type: Public
- Traded as: Nasdaq: CLIR; Russell Microcap Index component
- Headquarters: Seattle, Washington, United States
- Key people: Colin "Jim" Deller (CEO)
- Net income: ▼US$-5.29 million (2014)
- Number of employees: 16
- Website: clearsign.com

ClearSign Technologies Corporation (ClearSign) is a United States-based company that develops emission-control technology.

== Products ==
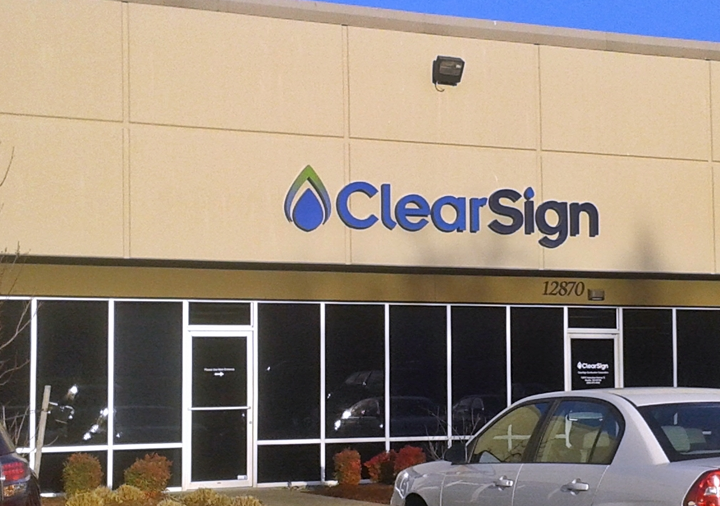
The offices of ClearSign Technologies Corporation pictured in 2015

ClearSign develops technology intended to increase energy efficiency and emissions standards of combustion systems, primarily industrial and commercial boilers and furnaces. Its products include Duplex Burner Architecture, which the company says reduces combustion burner flame length by more than 80-percent, in turn increasing thermal capacity and reducing operating costs. Duplex Burner Architecture won the "New Technology Development of the Year Award" at the 2014 West Coast Oil & Gas Awards. The company's other major product is Electrodynamic Combustion Control, which uses computer-controlled electric fields to control the flame shape in boilers, kilns, and furnaces, preventing pollution from forming.

== History ==
ClearSign was formed in Seattle, Washington in 2008. Its first chief executive officer was Richard Rutkowski, who also became chairman of the board of directors. Rutkowski was a co-founder of projection technology company Microvision and nanotechnology company Lumera.

In 2012 ClearSign held an initial public offering which, according to the company, raised $13.8 million. ClearSign chose to delay adopting accounting standards required of publicly traded companies under the Sarbanes-Oxley Act, taking advantage of exemptions in the JOBS Act designed to make it cheaper for development-stage companies to raise capital. It is believed ClearSign may have been the first company in the U.S. to do so.

In December 2014, Rutkowski resigned as CEO. He was replaced by board member Stephen Pirnat. The following September, the company was named "Technology Company of the Year" by Petroleum Economist.

On November 12, 2019, ClearSign Combustion Corporation (Nasdaq: CLIR) (“ClearSign” or the “Company”), announced that the company has changed its name to ClearSign Technologies Corporation. The company's ticker “CLIR” will remain the same.

As of September 2024, ClearSign Technologies held US$14 million in cash and had no debt. Over the preceding year, the company reported a cash burn of US$5.7 million, indicating a projected cash runway of approximately 2.5 years from that date. During the same period, ClearSign increased its cash burn by 115%, reflecting a significant rise in investment activity. This coincided with a 263% increase in revenue over the year.
