= Lecture recording =

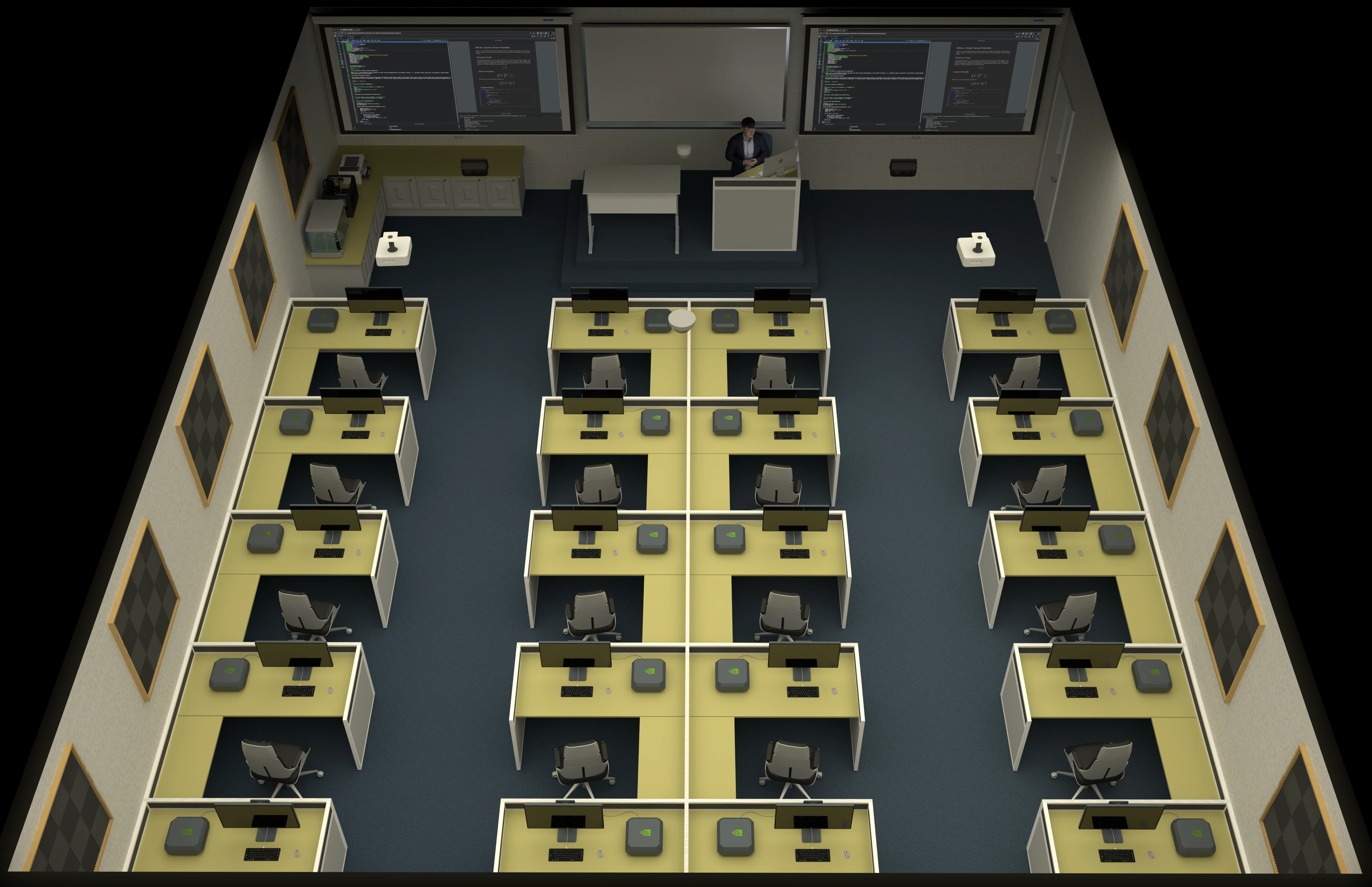
3D design of a computational classroom that can do lecture recording using cameras, lavalier microphones, and screen capturing software.

Lecture recording refers to the process of recording and archiving the content of a lecture, conference, or seminar. It consists of hardware and software components that work in synergy to record the audio and visual components of the lecture. It is widely used in universities and higher education in the UK and Australia to provide support for students. 71% of institutions responding to a UCISA survey in 2016 indicated that this technology was available in their institution. Where lecture recording is done at scale, the recording system may be integrated with the timetabling system and the collection of metadata may be automated.

== Hardware ==
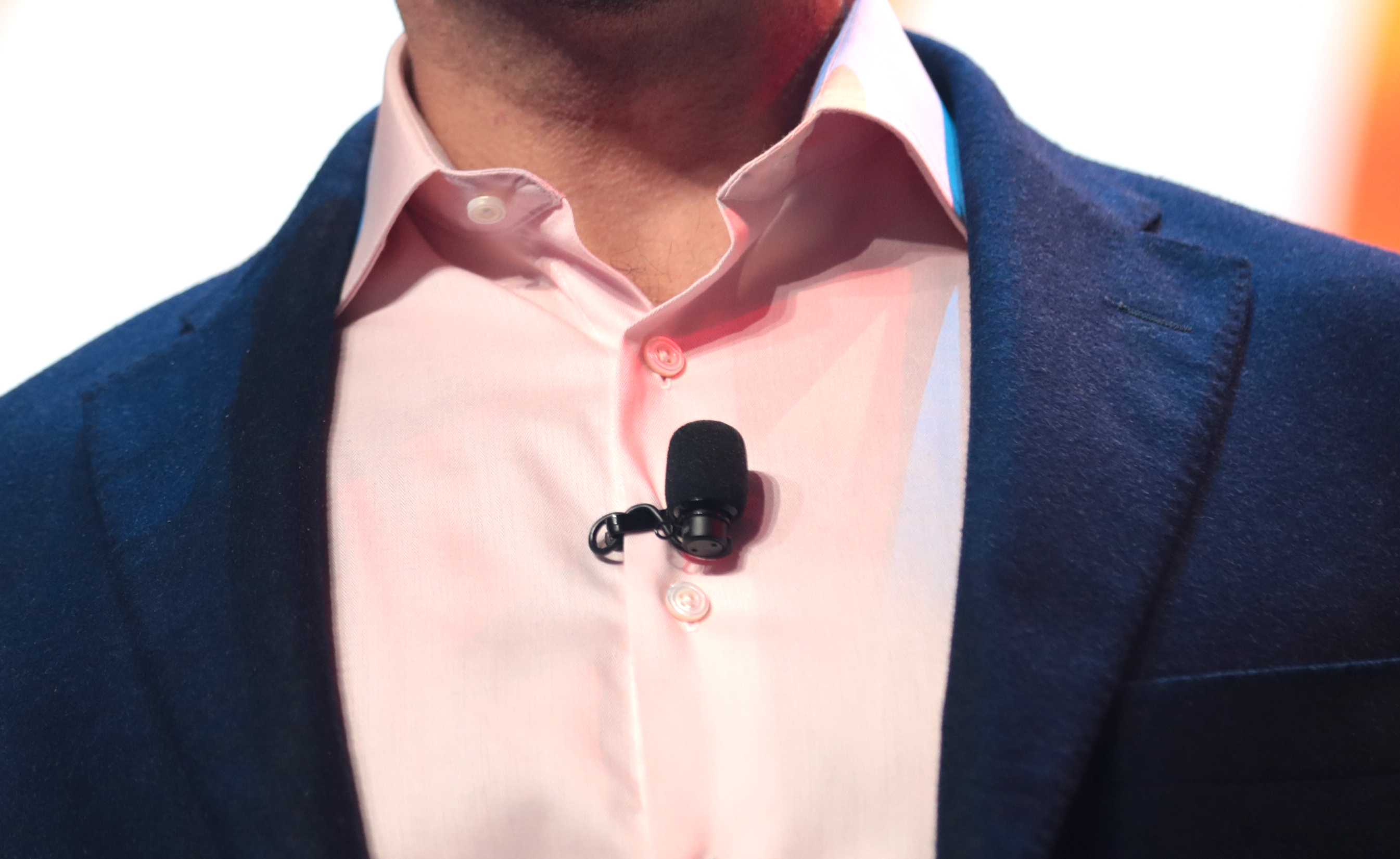
Lavalier microphone

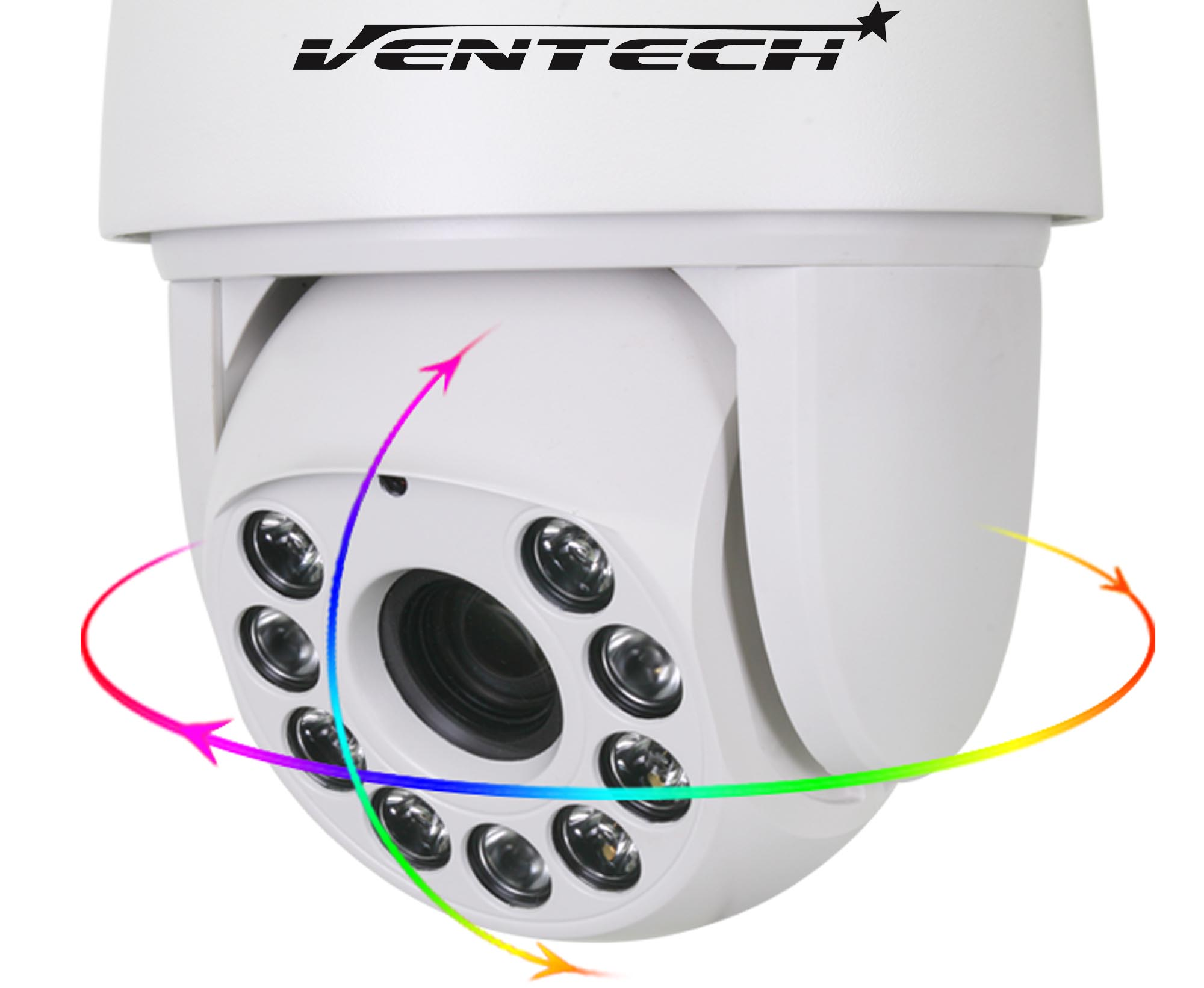
Pan–tilt–zoom camera

Hardware such as a lavalier microphone can be used to capture the lecturer's voice along with the video of the lecturer. Sometimes, the lecturer may use visual aids to support their speech, such as slide shows, which are presented to the audience with some kind of projector. In this case, such slide shows can also be recorded. Once captured, the data is then either stored directly on the capture hardware or sent to a server over a LAN or the Internet. After some processing to adapt the video formats to the desired distribution mechanism, codecs, etc., viewers are then able to remotely access the recording, either in live stream or video on demand.

The recording of a lecture or presentation may use any combination of the following tools: Microphone, Camera, Screen capture, Presentation capture, or Document camera.

== Software ==
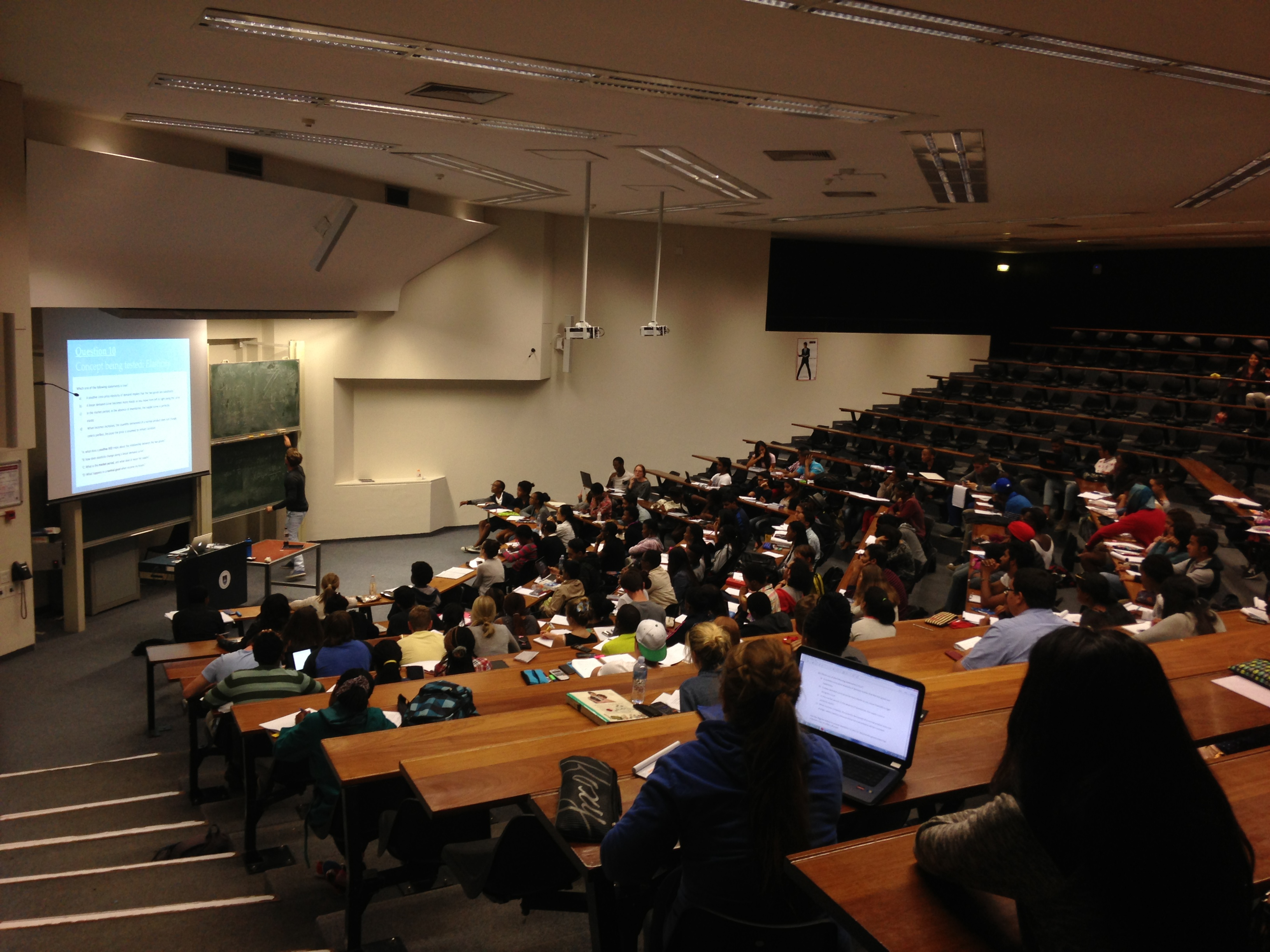
A university lecture

Software is used both on the capture hardware, the viewer's computer, and the production server. Software ranges from simple web browsers and video players to stand-alone software programs made specifically for viewing lectures. The viewer's as well as the presenter's software must be compatible with the software on the server which receives the content from the capture hardware, produces it, and sends it to the viewer's computer on-demand. OpenCast is an open-source video capture system available in higher education.

Modern lecture recording software supports advanced features such as indexing through OCR, instant search, real-time video editing and annotation, along with other advanced features.

== Uses ==
Lecture recording has been used in the flipped classroom learning model as a means to provide materials outside of traditional lectures or seminars. Students are able to self-study by playing back and interacting with recorded lectures.

Some educational institutions use lecture recording as a means to replace the traditional classroom with an online classroom. Lecture recording can also be used to create reference materials as a supplementary resource. Lecture recording is not always welcomed by university faculty. Faculty attitudes to this kind of technology enhanced learning may vary across disciplines. Student research has found that more students than staff expect lecture recording to be beneficial to learning. In the most part students watch lectures for pragmatic reasons rather than lecture quality. Students do not view recorded lectures as a replacement for attending live lectures, and often continue to attend face to face sessions. Students who use recorded lectures as a supplement sometimes score significantly higher in subsequent assessment.

Some firms may also use lecture recordings as advertising, collaboration, or training materials.

In addition, lecture capture technology may offer compliance, for example with United States legislation such as Section 508 for students with disabilities. In the United Kingdom, under the Equality Act 2010, universities should provide reasonable adjustments. Providing access to lecture recordings may be considered to be such a reasonable adjustment.

== Research ==
Lecture captures are becoming increasingly popular. Many institutions including the University of Manchester, University of Glasgow, University of Bristol and Loughborough University provide guidelines for recording and presentation of lectures which would be useful for learning and there is a growing literature that considers the benefits of lecture capture to students and tutors, as well as the extent of student usage of lecture recordings. Research at Cornell University found increased flexibility for students and faculty.
