= Findwell =

findwell Real Estate
- Industry: Real estate
- Founded: Seattle, WA, U.S. (2008)
- Headquarters: Seattle, Washington, U.S.
- Area served: Seattle
- Key people: Kevin Lisota (CEO); Shannon Ressler (Director of Marketing)
- Number of employees: 7 as of July 2011
- Website: www.findwell.com

Findwell is an online real estate company that provides real estate search and real estate brokerage. Findwell is privately funded and currently serves the Seattle metro area. The company was founded by Kevin Lisota, a former Microsoft employee, and is based in Seattle.

== Sources ==
- "Heroes of the Economic Recovery Move to the Cloud with Office 365" by Microsoft, June 28, 2011
- "Hot-Button: Web-based Real Estate" by Dan Catchpole, Seattle Magazine, December 30, 2009
- "Findwell taps Estately for a new real estate search experience" by John Cook, TechFlash, August 5, 2009
- "Building an online real estate firm during a terrible slump is learning experience for Findwell" by Kirsten Grind, Puget Sound Business Journal, February 13, 2009
- "The fight to take on traditional brokers" by Aubrey Cohen, Seattle PI, November 10, 2008
- "Redfin reduces refunds to home buyers, rolls out new services" by John Cook, TechFlash, November 6, 2008
- "Findwell takes on Redfin in real estate" by John Cook, Seattle PI, September 8, 2008
