= Jaxtr =

- Industry: Social communications
- Founded: October 2005
- Founder: Touraj Parang and Philip Mobin
- Defunct: June 14, 2018
- Headquarters: Menlo Park, CA, United States
- Key people: Konstantin Guericke
- Parent: Sabsebolo

Jaxtr was a social communications company that melds together global calling, SMS, and social networking. Founded by Phillip Mobin and Touraj Parang in October 2005, Jaxtr uses Voice over Internet Protocol to offer competitive rates as well as free international and long distance calling. Some key differentiators for Jaxtr in its market include allowing phone-to-phone calls to and from any mobile and landline phones, offering social networking focused on voice (café jaxtr), requiring no software downloads or access pins, and giving users local Direct Inward Dialing (DID) phone numbers. Offered in 56 countries, these numbers allow users in those countries to dial a local phone number which would ring a long distance or international destination phone. Jaxtr also offers users a set number of global SMS messages each month.

Jaxtr reported having over 10 million users in 220 countries in 2008. In June 2008, they raised $10 million in a Series B round of venture capital funding from Lehman Brothers Venture Partners. In the same month, they also launched their paid services. In October 2008, Jaxtr laid off thirty percent of its employees, and its CEO, Konstantin Guericke, was fired.

The company was located in Menlo Park, CA.

On 14 June 2009, Hotmail founder Sabeer Bhatia's company, Sabsebolo acquired Jaxtr for an unknown amount, which effectively meant closing down the service as stated by co-founder Touraj Parang.

== Technology ==
While Skype popularized the concept to make calls through personal computers for consumers, Jaxtr built on that concept by allowing calls to be routed through VoIP to and from both mobile and landline phones. As a hybrid of telephony and Web technologies, Jaxtr is built with Java components and MySQL database servers, which run a protocol-independent calls engine that combines users' voice and text conversations. Jaxtr uses open source software throughout the system--memcached, Asterisk, and OpenSER SIP server among others.

Jaxtr provided local phone numbers in numerous countries around the world by contracting with wholesale Direct Inward Dialing (DID) service providers such as DIDX. Providing users with these DIDs allows them to dial a local number, which is routed through jaxtr’s VoIP system, and connects with the person they are calling internationally. As a result, the caller pays their service provider only the standard charge for local calling, instead of international toll.

== Products ==
=== JaxtrSMS ===
JaxtrSMS was a cross-platform, open texting application. This mobile application let users send unlimited free text messages to any other phone anywhere in the world. Also, JaxtrSMS retained the number of the user and no new number was required like regular SMS.

Although initially promoted as a free product, Jaxtr later asked some users to pay for delivery of SMS messages to countries other than India and the USA.

== See also ==
- Voice over Internet Protocol
- Direct Inward Dialing
