= Aero Controls =

Coordinates: 47.325974°N 122.253838°W

Aero Controls, LLC.
- Type: Private
- Industry: Aerospace engineering services
- Founded: 1984
- Headquarters: Auburn, Washington, United States
- Key people: John Titus, Kusumam Titus
- Revenue: $50.0 Million (2008) USD
- Number of employees: 250+ (2008)
- Website: www.aerocontrols.com

Aero Controls, LLC. (formerly Aero Controls, INC.) is an aerospace engineering company founded in October 1984 by John Titus, the CEO and President of the Company, originally headquartered in Seattle, Washington.

== History ==
It is a FAA certified repair station. The company overhauls, repairs, sells, exchanges and modifies components of aircraft. It opened a satellite location in Shelton, Washington in 1993. In 1995 Aero Controls was presented with the Federal Express Minority Supplier of the Year Award. In 1996 the Company acquired Aero Systems Aviation Corp. in Miami. In 2006 Aero Controls Avionics was merged with Aero Controls, LLC. In 2007 the company acquired Ft. Lauderdale based Patriot Aviation Services, LLC. The company has approximately 250 employees and revenues of 50 M. It is actually headquartered in Auburn, Washington.. It was purchased by ATC group in 2026.

== Community service ==
Aero Controls LLC participates in community services such as, food drive: assisting local food banks in feeding the homeless and underprivileged in the Auburn, Kent, Federal Way, Shelton and Miami Florida areas; Heart Walk: Benefits the American Heart Association; Relay for Life: Benefits the American Cancer Society; Backpack Program: Provides school supplies for needy children; Aero Controls Golf Tournament: held annually to raise money for the community service fund; Adopt-A- Family; Highway Clean Up; Puget Sound Blood Mobile.
