= Lars Arendt-Nielsen =

Danish researcher

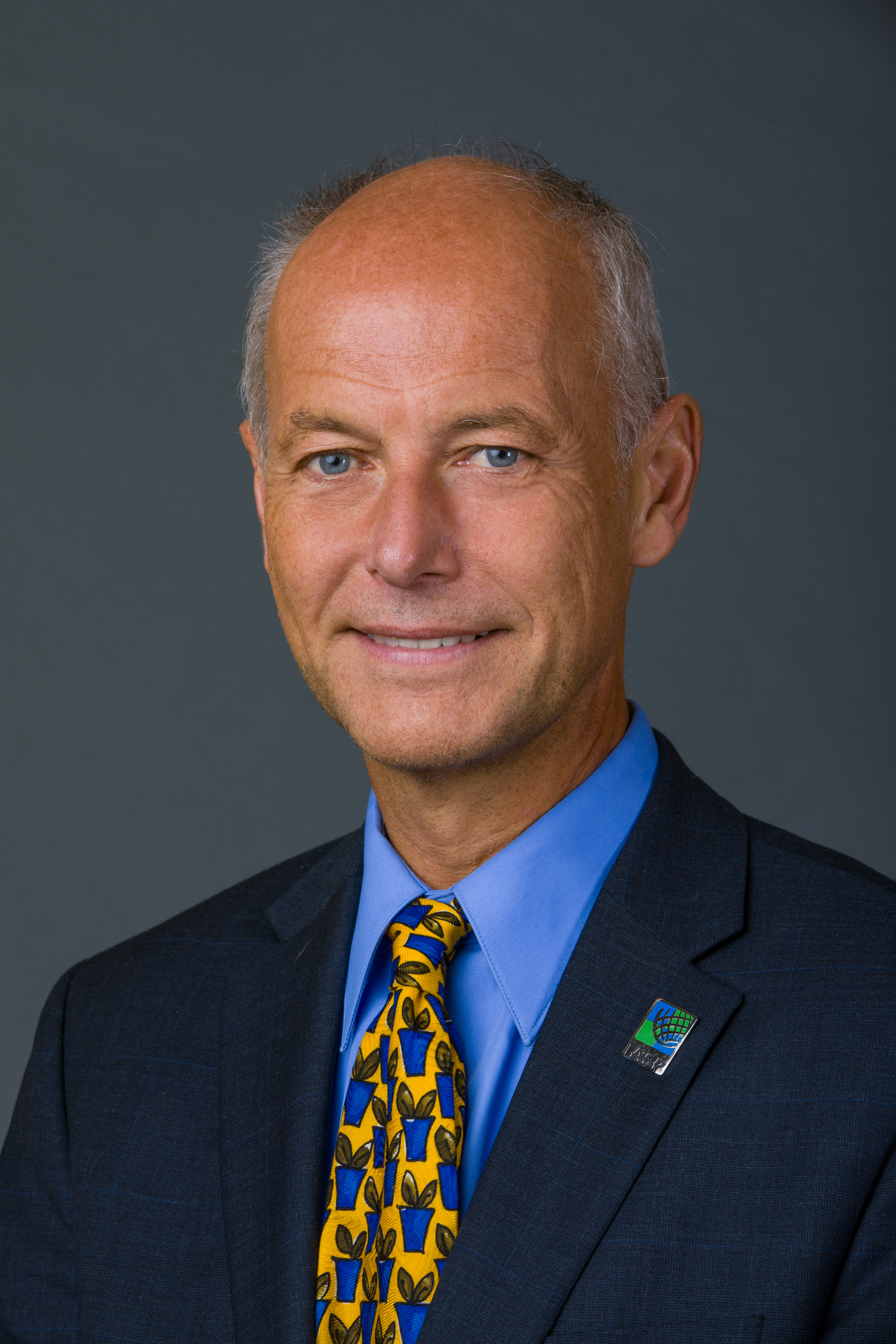
- Professor Lars Arendt-Nielsen
- Born: 5 June 1958 (age 68); Langeskov, Denmark
- Citizenship: Denmark
- Education: Aalborg University, University College London
- Known for: Center fort Neuroplasticity and Pain, Center for Sensory-Motor Interaction (SMI)
- Awards: Knight of the Order of the Dannebrog
- Scientific career
- Fields: Translational Pain Research and Bio-markers
- Workplaces: Aalborg University

Lars Arendt-Nielsen (born 5 June 1958 in Langeskov, Denmark) is a professor at Aalborg University specialising in translational pain research and bio-markers. Lars Arendt-Nielsen's research is highly recognised internationally, and in addition to his university work he has established several businesses.

== Educational background ==
In 1982, Lars Arendt-Nielsen was awarded a master's degree in Biomedical Sciences and continued his studies at University College London. In 1987 he was awarded the PhD degree in biomedical sciences from Aalborg University, and in 1994 he was awarded the higher doctoral degree in medicine from Aarhus University.

== Background, career and academic contributions ==
Lars Arendt-Nielsen was inspired by the English pain researcher Patrick David Wall (25 April 1925 – 8 August 2001), who taught Lars Arendt-Nielsen at UCL, London in 1983–84, to pursue a career in pain research. Wall diligently pointed out to his students that research in pain was lacking, and Lars Arendt-Nielsen responded to this throughout his academic career.

In 1993 Lars Arendt-Nielsen became a professor in biomedical sciences at Aalborg University and was instrumental in establishing the Center for Sensory-Motor Interaction (SMI) and formalise the establishment of the experimental and clinical pain research unit. It is from this platform his research group significantly developed, focusing on the following main fields:

1) Translational pain research.

2) Quantitative, human bio-markers and experimental tools for provocation and assessment of pain from skin, muscles and viscera in healthy volunteers and pain patients.

3) Development of human bio-markers for the screening/profiling new analgesics.

4) Quantitative, human bio-markers and experimental tools for provocation and assessment of itch in healthy volunteers and chronic itch patients.

5) Development of human itch-markers for the screening/profiling new anti-pruritic drugs.

Under Lars Arendt-Nielsen's leadership, the pain research at Aalborg University developed into one of the largest and most productive pain research groups in the world. The research team counted at some stage more than 90 researchers from many different disciplines and countries (50% internationalisation). Lars Arendt-Nielsen likewise founded a PhD programme in 1997 (The Doctoral School In Medicine, Biomedical Science and Technology) with more than 70 enrolled students. Personally, he has supervised more than 50 PhD students and has published more than 1000 peer-reviewed journal papers (sum of times cited 34,420, average citations per item 31.05, H-index 85, Web of Science). Lars Arendt Nielsen's list of publications is available at:

http://vbn.aau.dk/da/persons/lars-arendtnielsen(1794f9ec-22f1-47af-96c1-88c23c3b06a2)/publications.html

As a researcher, Lars Arendt-Nielsen has managed research funds amounting to a total value of approx. 60 million euros.

Lars Arendt-Nielsen has established an extensive global network with universities, hospitals and industries; he has worked in England, Sweden, Japan and Italy and has given more than 350 keynote lectures at international conferences and meetings.

In 2016, Lars Arendt-Nielsen was appointed president-elect of the International Association for the Study of Pain (IASP), which has approx. 8,000 members in 132 countries. From October 2018 to October 2020 Lars Arendt-Nielsen served as president for IASP.

Lars Arendt-Nielsen also plays an active role in the business community; he founded Bio-Medical Consult ApS (LLC) and has been its managing director since 2004; C4Pain (LLC) and research director since 2011; a co-founder and board member of Nocitech since 2013 and centre director of the Health Science and Technology Business Park (Eir) since 2011.

Lars Arendt-Nielsen has held a wide range of positions of trust, including:

- Member of the Aalborg University board of directors 2003–2007 and 2012–2017.
- Council member of the International Association for the Study of Pain (IASP).
- President of the Global Year Against Musculoskeletal Pain (IASP) (2010)
- President of the Global Year Against Joint Pain (IASP (2016).
- Co-founder of the IASP's Special Interest Group (SIG) on musculoskeletal pain.
- Chairman of the IASP's Grant Committee.
- Editor-in-Chief of IASP Press.

== Honours and awards ==
- Knight of the Order of the Dannebrog (2007)
- The "Pasteur Award" of the Innovations Foundation (2014)
- The Association of Chronic Pain Patients’ (FAKS) Annual award (2014)
- The Danish Association of Masters and PhDs’ research award for Science and Technology
- The Fibromyalgia Association's Annual Award (2015)
- Director Ib Henriksen Foundation's large Research Award (2015)
- The Danish Association of Masters and PhDs’ Research Award (2015)
- The Bagger-Sorensen Research Award (2015)
- The North Jutland Management Award (2016)
- Queen Ingrid's research award (2016)
