= Onvia =

American business intelligence company

Onvia, Inc.
- Type: Public
- Traded as: Nasdaq: ONVI
- Industry: Business intelligence
- Founded: 1996; 30 years ago
- Founder: Glenn Ballman
- Headquarters: Seattle, Washington, United States
- Parent: Deltek
- Website: onvia.com

Onvia, Inc. is an American government business intelligence company with 180 employees and annual revenue of US $21.1 million. Onvia offers a number of business-to-business software products, including Onvia Business Builder, a government leads and relationship manager; Onvia Navigator, a database of government contracts; and the Onvia Guide, which provides push notifications of government business opportunities.

Onvia is located in Seattle, Washington, USA.

== History ==
Onvia was founded in 1996 by 25-year-old Canadian entrepreneur Glenn Ballman, as a one-stop shop for small business owners, initially selling over 25,000 office supplies on its website, Onvia.com. Onvia raised US $70 million in early rounds of financing, and went public on March 1, 2000 on the NASDAQ where it raised US $235 million. In August 2000 the company was awarded "Hottest Startup in Canada" by the Toronto Board of Trade and Profit Magazine. In August 2000 Onvia acquired Globe-1, a business-to-government portal, turning the company's focus away from e-commerce to the government-bid space. Onvia then used its cash reserves to buy competitors, including DemandStar in March 2001.

In 2005, Onvia released Onvia Business Builder, a tool allowing subscribers to research historical and real-time data on individual government contract opportunities Onvia continued to focus on the business to government market until the launch of their private sector tool, Onvia Planning and Construction, in February 2008. In the third quarter of 2007, Onvia reported net income for the first time, but has lost money in all but that one quarter, according to its SEC filings.

In early 2009, Onvia launched www.recovery.gov, with the stated goal of bringing increased transparency and accountability to economic recovery spending. The site features real-time data, maps, and graphs detailing the spending activity associated with the American Recovery and Reinvestment Act

In November 2017, Onvia was purchased by Deltek, a division of Roper Technologies.
