= Alex Algard =

High tech entrepreneur and founder and CEO of Whitepages

- Born: 1974 (age 51–52); Stockholm, Sweden
- Education: Stanford University
- Occupation: Businessman
- Known for: Co-founder of CarDomain.com (1998); Founder of Whitepages.com (1996); CEO of Hiya (2016)

Alex Algard is an Internet entrepreneur. He is the founder and CEO of Hiya, the founder and former Chairman of Ekata (formerly Whitepages Pro), and the founder and former CEO of Whitepages.com, and CarDomain.

== Biography ==
His father was Swedish and his mother was Korean.

Algard has a BA degree in Economics (1996) and a MS degree in Engineering (1998) from Stanford University.

== Career ==
Algard founded Whitepages in 1996 after purchasing the domain name for $900. He began the business by developing an online database of public phone directory information. The website began generating revenue through advertisements, that reached $66 million a year by 2008. Algard also created an Internet community called CarDomain Network with a high school friend in 1999. The site facilitated communication between niche car enthusiasts.

In 2010 Whitepages' two biggest clients, Yellowpages.com and Superpages.com, cut their expenditures after Google ventured into local business searches. Subsequently, when profits plummeted, the company's investors became agitated, and Algard bought out Whitepages' investors for $80m. Algard pledged his assets, savings accounts and his family's home to the bank to raise the extra $30m in capital required for the buyout. In the spring of 2016, Algard created a new company to identify mobile phone spammers and robocalls and to ensure that important calls were not missed. He named the organization Hiya. Deals with T-mobile and Samsung, as well as a Balderton Capital-led series A round followed.

== Personal life ==
When he was a teenager, his family moved to Vancouver, B.C.
