= Lars Nielsen (engineer) =

Swedish engineer (born 1955)

Lars Nielsen (born 1955) is a Swedish engineer.

Nielsen pursued graduate study at Lund University, where he completed a master's degree in engineering physics in 1979, followed by a doctorate in automatic control six years later. He has taught at Linköping University since 1992, where he was appointed Sten Gustafsson chair in vehicular systems. Nielsen was the 2013 recipient of the Håkan Frisinger Award, a prize of the Volvo Research and Educational Foundations.
