= Crowd Cow =

American online meat delivery marketplace

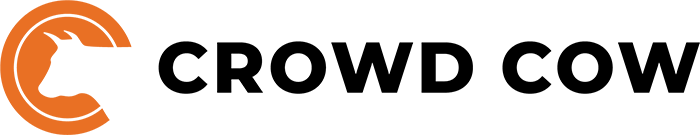
- Type: Private
- Industry: Online food ordering
- Founded: 2015; 11 years ago
- Founder: Joe Heitzeberg; Ethan Lowry
- Headquarters: Seattle, United States
- Area served: Contiguous United States
- Key people: Elizabeth Liu (CEO); Joe Heitzeberg (Chairman); Saba Kalaimani (COO)
- Number of employees: 90 (2020)
- Website: www.crowdcow.com

Crowd Cow is an American online meat and seafood delivery service headquartered in Seattle, Washington.

The company was founded in 2015 by Joe Heitzeberg and Ethan Lowry. It initially shipped beef to customers and later expanded their offerings to include chicken, pork, lamb, and seafood.

Crowd Cow began importing Japanese A5 Wagyu beef in 2017. It received criticism for importing Wagyu beef from Japan while American beef ranchers had challenges competing with foreign producers. The company raised $25 million from investors, including Maveron, Zulily founders Darrell Cavens and Mark Vadon, Joe Montana, and Ashton Kutcher.

== History ==
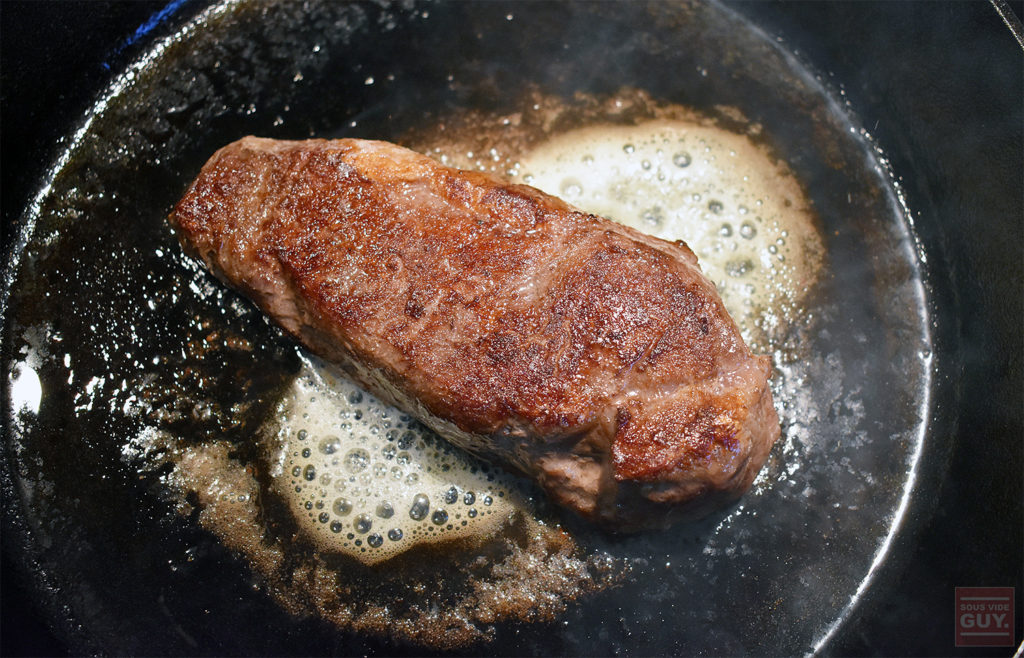
A Crowd Cow steak in a cast iron pan

Crowd Cow was established in mid-2015 by Joe Heitzeberg and Ethan Lowry. They had met each other in the 2000s at Avogadro, a mobile startup later purchased by Openwave. Heitzeberg was the founder of Snapvine. Lowry was the co-founder of the restaurant recommendation service Urbanspoon, and had previously been the owner with Heitzeberg of Hack Things, a company that teaches software engineers about the production of computer hardware. The name "Crowd Cow" was inspired by the founders' using the crowdfunding of meat from cows to establish the company.

The two co-founders discussed startup concepts together and thought back to a shared friend who repeatedly praised the entire cow he had purchased from a Western Washington farm. The friend had made purchases every year of a 500-pound (230 kg) supply of beef to share with another person. Lowry was the only person who consumed meat in his household since his wife is a vegetarian. Although he was unable to rationalize purchasing 400 pounds (180 kg) of meat through a farm for himself, he thought it would be feasible if he could get 50 people to participate. Lowry and Heitzeberg visited a Starbucks to conduct research, asking patrons for their opinions. The response largely fell into two categories: "I'm a vegetarian, don't bother me" and "That sounds absolutely amazing". They had prior involvement around 2013 in Kickstarter when they crowdfunded to create the product Poppy, which transformed iPhones into stereo cameras and wanted to use Kickstarter to test their idea. The pair were drawn to the notion of purchasing a farm's meat without going through an intermediary. They did not know anyone who sold cattle, so they conducted Google searches and visited farmers' markets and butchers but remained unable to find anyone who could help them. The co-founders next made unsolicited calls to nearby farms that typically went to voicemail. When they reached someone from a farm, that person would be skeptical of their plans. The duo in the end found two farms that they visited and were able to set up an agreement with. After locating a farm to sell beef to them, they sent an email to 100 friends about their plans. They conducted a Kickstarter campaign for testing purposes in which they hoped to sell portions of a 550-pound (250 kg) cow they had purchased from a tiny farm near Seattle. Their website received 600 visits, and they took one day to sell their initial cow in the middle of June 2015 through orders from friends and people living in Washington, Chicago, New York, and Florida. The founders had little knowledge about selling beef. When they attempted to purchase an entire cow, they learned that they were actually looking for steer. Whereas cows are female cattle raised to make milk, steer are male cattle raised for slaughter.

In January 2016, Crowd Cow employed two people, Heitzeberg and Lowry; operated only in the state of Washington; and purchased steer and heifers from six farms in the state. It received $1 million in sales after being open for several months. Every week, Crowd Cow would feature a steer on its website to allow customers to buy defined parts of it. It took about one or two days for the entire cow to be purchased. The founders wrote the software to account for crowdfunding in the purchase. They employed computer algorithms to calculate how much ice would be needed to keep the meat from going bad, taking into account the weather forecast of where the meat is being shipped to. Initially, the company only purchased the ranch's animal after customers had bought a sufficient portion of it. Upon discovering that customers would regularly and swiftly buy the beef, they began to purchase the cows and dry age the meat before the sales went through. The co-founders were responsible for personally packaging the beef in February 2016 but delegated the work by October 2016.

In January 2017, Crowd Cow had shipped almost 100 cattle to customers, and by August 2017, that number grew to 300 cattle. In 2017, it received several thousand monthly orders from customers who usually purchased beef on a two-month cadence. In 2017, Crowd Cow began shipping its products to everywhere in the United States except for Alaska and Hawaii. That year, their Seattle depot packed the beef for their West Coast customers while their newly opened Lancaster, Pennsylvania, depot did likewise for their East Coast customers. By August 2017, Crowd Cow had grown to 22 employees.

The co-founders self-funded Crowd Cow from its establishment through the beginning of 2017. On January 24, 2017, Crowd Cow received a $2 million seed investment headed up by Fuel Capital, which was joined by Maveron, Zulily founders Darrell Cavens and Mark Vadon, and the National Football League quarterback Joe Montana. The investment supported Crowd Cow in increasing the number of locations to which it shipped its products. Calling himself "a big meat lover", Montana joined the investment round because he liked that Crowd Cow told him the source of his meat and found that the company served a niche where there was limited competition. Montana's participation in the funding led People for the Ethical Treatment of Animals (PETA) to send him a letter filled with football puns imploring him not to invest in a company that facilitates the slaughtering of animals. On May 24, 2018, Crowd Cow secured $8 million in a Series A funding round headed by Madrona, which was joined by Joe Montana, Ashton Kutcher, and Guy Oseary's Sound Ventures. At the time of the funding round, Crowd Cow was making $1 million in monthly revenue, which was a tenfold increase from the previous year.

In 2018, Crowd Cow partnered with a Shake Shack Seattle location in which Crowd Cow provided the restaurant with enough grass-fed beef to every day make 100 hamburgers they named "Montlake Double Cut". By 2019, the company reached $10 million in annual sales. In June 2019, Kutcher's Sound Ventures invested $1 million to purchase a convertible security to be used later during a Series B round for Crowd Cow. On November 18, 2019, Crowd Cow received $15.1 million in a Series B funding round. The company's revenue increased fourfold at the beginning of the COVID-19 pandemic as people were unable to visit restaurants and were largely stuck with making meals at home. It grew to 90 employees in mid-2020.

== Products ==
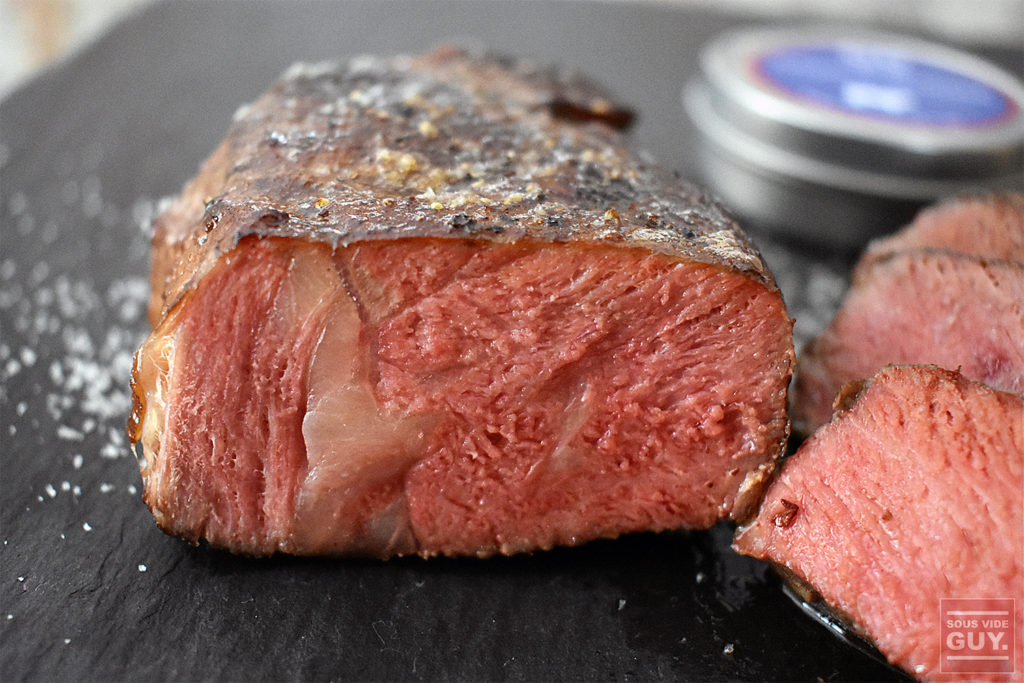
A Crowd Cow sous vide New York strip steak

When Crowd Cow started, it only sold beef. Its area of concentration is on selling different types of beef including the expensive Japanese A5 wagyu. It also sells chicken, pork, lamb, and seafood. Crowd Cow sells less frequently available meats such as bison, and during Thanksgiving, it sells turkeys. The company began selling pork for the first time on May 2, 2018. The types of pork it sold were pork chops, pork ribs, chorizo, bacon, and sausage. It sourced the pork from Deck Family Farms in Willamette Valley, Oregon, for West Coast customers and Autumn's Harvest Farm in Finger Lakes, New York, for East Coast customers.

Its website features information about the ranches from which it sources its animals and how they treat the animals. The magazine Grist said the company "offers slick marketing, full of frequent beef puns and lovely photos". It allows consumers to view the ratings people have given the ranches. Initially only sourcing their cows from the United States and then Japan, Crowd Cow in 2018 began procuring beef from Tasmania. In 2020, Crowd Cow procured its meat from 100 farms in 23 states. It sources its meat from only unaffiliated farms and not from factory farms. Crowd Cow sells recently netted and smoked fish which it largely sources from fishery cooperatives. Seafood it sells includes Maine lobster, Icelandic Arctic char, lingcod, halibut, blue shrimp, and Dungeness crab. The company offers customers a "recurring subscription box" of meat. The meat in the boxes varies depending on the time of year since Crowd Cow sources its meat from tiny, unaffiliated farms. The usual sales involve quantities of meat that range from 5–10 pounds (2.3–4.5 kg).

Crowd Cow enables customers to purchase modest portions of premium ranch-raised beef. The Guardian said in 2017 that Crowd Cow charges similar prices to Whole Foods and butcher shops. Crowd Cow advises its customers not to prepare the beef past medium rare. The customer chooses among different meat cuts including New York strip steak, rib eye steak, Coulotte steak, flat iron trimmings steak, and filet mignon. Other parts of the cattle for purchase include the animal's heart, tongue, liver, kidneys, tail, hooves, and bones for making broth.

=== Wagyu beef ===
On July 12, 2017, Crowd Cow began importing to its American customers the Japanese A5 Wagyu beef from Mirai Farm, which is based in Kagoshima Prefecture in Japan. According to Food & Wine, Crowd Cow became "the largest single importer and online retailer" of that type of beef. The company's co-founder Joe Heitzeberg, who has a Japanese minor from the University of Washington, visited farmers and butchers in Japan to learn about wagyu. It is the first company to import to American customers the Olive Wagyu, a scarce type of Wagyu made from Shōdoshima cows that are given olive oil, rice straw, and ryegrass to eat. Defeating 182 other Wagyu brands, the Olive Wagyu won the "Best Fat Quality" award in 2017 during the quinquennial Wagyu Olympics. After the COVID-19 pandemic caused many restaurants to close, Crowd Cow turned into the largest supplier of Japanese A5 wagyu beef to Americans and sold over 50% of that type of meat purchased by Americans.

Crowd Cow's importation of wagyu beef from Japan sparked criticism. Critics thought the company was betraying American ranchers who faced difficulties in raising grass-fed cattle while inexpensive non-American beef was being imported. They pointed out that Crowd Cow had promoted selling locally produced meat, especially since its mission statement says it ships "healthy, high-quality, sustainable meat" from the "very best local farms". Following the wave of criticism, the company revised its mission statement to remove the words "local" and "sustainable". To promote the wagyu beef, Crowd Cow produced articles, videos, and Instagram quotes. It started a haiku competition in which the victor would receive a Japanese knife. The James Beard Foundation Award-winning author Adam Danforth entered the haiku: "The Best Beef / Is Found On American Farmland / Vote With Your Money".

== Allotment, preparation and shipment of meat ==
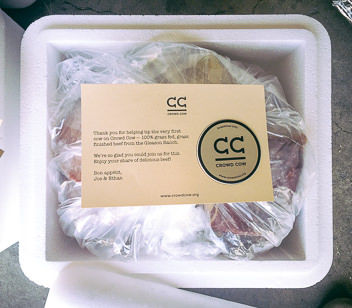
Crowd Cow ships a white styrofoam cooler with a warning card on top for the dry ice inside.

The animal is split into about 50 allotments. After customers have purchased sufficiently profitable portions of a head of cattle, they each are given the date at which the meat will be sent to them and a photo of a cow on its website will "tip" over. In a similar practice followed by Kickstarter, customers do not need to pay when the cow does not "tip". A cow is "tipped" after customers choose 67% of it. The cow is then slaughtered, packed up, and branded with a barcode. The cow is delivered to a Crowd Cow distribution location, of which it had two in 2017. After being placed in a Styrofoam cooler stuffed with dry ice, the meat is frozen and mailed to the customer in a box with vacuum packing. Crowd Cow includes around four recipes about how to cook the meat based on the parts of the cow chosen by the customer.

Crowd Cow discontinued the crowdsourcing and "tipping" way in which it sells its meat. Focused on expanding its services across the United States, the company no longer waited for customers to purchase the entire cow. The reasons were that consumers were used to receiving products quickly and were unaccustomed to eating parts of the animal like tongues and oxtails. Crowd Cow purchased the entire cow from ranches despite not always selling the entire cow to customers. A slaughtered cow usually produces 50 pounds (23 kg) of premium steaks, 150 pounds (68 kg) of roast meat, and over 200 pounds (91 kg) of beef mince. Since minced meat is the least popular but most plentiful of the meat, Crowd Cow began having huge stockpiles of it. According to two ranchers, in 2017, Crowd Cow dealt with the surplus of minced beef by either selling it at a heavy discount or donating it. Crowd Cow co-founder Heitzeberg said that the company handled the surplus minced meat through multiple methods. In addition to employing minced meat as a loss leader, the company had a partnership with Seattle Mariners' T-Mobile Park and Shake Shack to promote their meat.

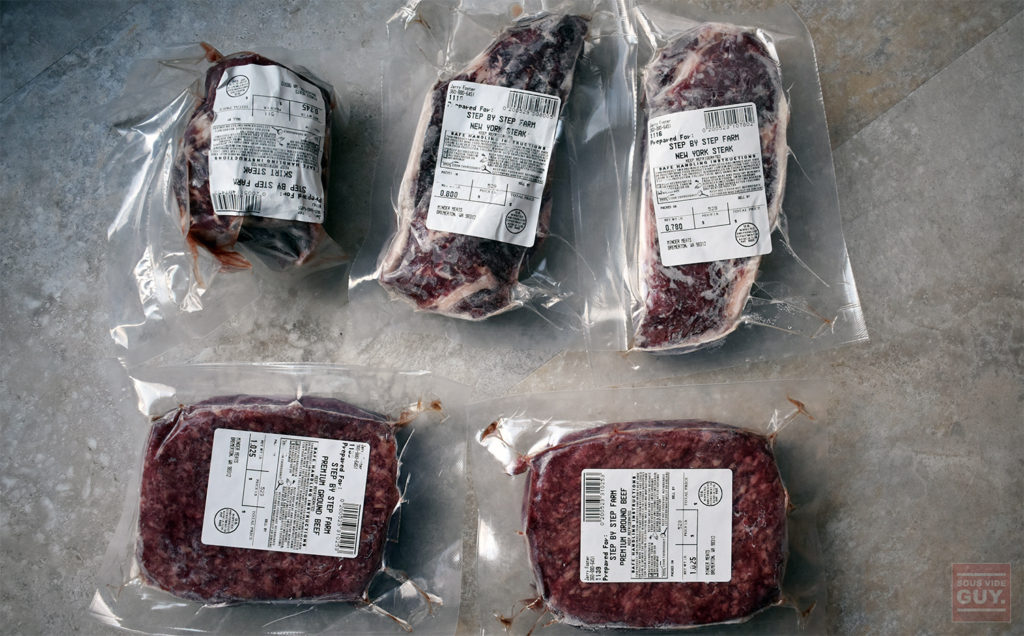
Crowd Cow packages its steaks in vacuum sealed bags.

In 2018, Crowd Cow ceased buying entire animals. It required the meat producers to sign consignment agreements in which ranchers were required to bear the cost of meat processing, which had to be done at a factory authorized by the company. Ranchers also had to pay for the packing of the meat and the delivery of it to Crowd Cow's delivery hub. When meat was not purchased by customers after 90 days, ranchers had two choices. They could either pay to ship the meat back to themselves or bear the cost of Crowd Cow's stockpiling it. After meat is sold, Crowd Cow takes a 22% cut before requiring the rancher to pay more money for handling the payments, dry ice, and packing. The agreement was not popular with numerous ranchers since it shifted the downside of not selling enough product from Crowd Cow to the ranchers themselves. Crowd Cow defended the contract, saying the original arrangement was an unsustainable way for the company to do business. Marilyn Noble of The Counter said that "while Crowd Cow began as a next-generation wholesaler, a bulk buyer of meat and a customer ranchers badly needed, producers say it now functions more like gig-economy platforms Grubhub and Airbnb—as in, it takes a big cut of revenue in exchange for providing access to an ostensibly large marketplace of shoppers."

== Sustainable agriculture ==
Crowd Cow promotes its products for following the sustainable agriculture principle of compassionately handling the farm animals. The meat it sells is made from animals that did not get injected with hormones or superfluous antibiotics. The farms used by Crowd Cow sometimes gave cattle antibiotics to address medical issues and never to stimulate growth. The company included a link on its website to a Portlandia parody depicting a duo filled with worry about whether the chicken they were ordering was raised with dignity. Crowd Cow's beef largely is from grass-fed and grass-finished cattle, and it offers pastured chickens and "heritage pork". It allows farmers to continue having their cattle eat grass instead of delivering calves to factory farms. Small farmers typically worked with public auctions, farmers' markets, restaurants, and butchers to sell their cattle. To promote sustainability, Crowd Cow purchases carbon offsets to counteract the carbon dioxide transmissions from its shipping its products, which it uses environmentally friendly wrapping for. The Independent's Olivia Petter said Crowd Cow "pioneered" the "craft beef" movement to promote "ethical and sustainable beef production". Richard VanVranken, a Rutgers University agriculture professor, said, "As long as there is a growing – or at least steady – consumer base interested in local and grass-fed beef, Crowd Cow has the opportunity to serve that market niche, in turn creating a steadier market outlet for local farmers." He praised Crowd Cow for enabling farmers to cut their marketing expenses, to raise rates, and to be able to calculate how many animals to raise in the upcoming years.

The company offered a recurring meat purchase subscription to farmers that lasted six months or a year to give them a steadier expectation of the number of animals they should raise. Ranchers considered the short-term notices insufficient since cultivating a steer until it is ready to be eaten requires between two and three years. Bob Boyce, the owner of Lil' Ponderosa Beef in Carlisle, Pennsylvania, said that Crowd Cow gave notice in August that the company would stop purchasing cattle in the last two months of the year and in November, Crowd Cow said it would not resume purchases until perhaps April. This left him with 40 extraneous cattle that he had earmarked for Crowd Cow. He further had several thousand dollars wasted at his slaughter house. Analyzing the situation, journalist Marilyn Noble of The Counter wrote, "twelve weeks' notice can feel like a blink in the grass-fed cattle business, which operates on the scale of years, not months. And Crowd Cow's decisions about supplier relationships could feel capricious." In a 2017 New York Times article, a rancher was worried that since Crowd Cow has received venture capital funding, it could be sold to someone who changes how Crowd Cow operates. Heitzeberg, the Crowd Cow co-founder, responded that he and Lowry created a company that is able to maintain its values while expanding and said, "We are not looking for an exit."

Ranchers frequently sell the most fresh and most premium meat. Customers usually must purchase large quantities of the beef but may not have enough room in their freezer to store half of a cow. Crowd Cow addressed the problem by crowdsourcing the purchase of cattle. An example of the sharing economy, Crowd Cow removes go-betweens like grocery stores in favor of directly connecting customers who seek meat and unaffiliated farmers who seek customers to sell meat to. Customers no longer have to spend a substantial amount of money to purchase a steer, nor do they have to ask friends to split the cost and steer. Since Crowd Cow procures its meat from numerous farms, it is able to offer a larger variety of goods and serve more areas compared to independent farmers. Ranchers are able to concentrate their energies on raising cattle instead of marketing their ranch on social media, writing blogs describing their cattle, and lining up customer purchases. Instead of only having their name on the meat shipped to customers, Crowd Cow includes the farm's name, thereby promoting and not erasing the ranchers' reputation.

== Reception and commentary ==
In a 2018 The Arizona Republic review, journalist Weldon B. Johnson wrote about Crowd Cow beef he had purchased, "It had a nice, beefy flavor and was tender and juicy, provided you cook it correctly." He noted that its beef is "an indulgence for most people who could not (or would not) pay $8 for a pound of ground beef or $20 for steak" and found that grocery stores sold high-grade meat for 50% cheaper than Crowd Cow's price. Johnson concluded that "What you're getting with Crowd Cow is more of an experience" for customers who find it "important" to receive the ranchers' and cattle's background. Writing for The Daily Beast, Daniel Modlin said that Crowd Cow "isn't just easy to get and learn about, it tastes better, too". Reviewed's Amanda Tarlton said that although it is more expensive than what is sold at supermarkets, "Crowd Cow is 10/10 worth it" for those who "like high-quality meat, avoiding the grocery store, and supporting independent farmers".

Jody Allard wrote in The Guardian that Crowd Cow "offers consumers a sense of accountability that's not easy to find in beef sold at megafood retailers". She noted that for a package of ground beef sold at Costco, it is infeasible to determine which countries the cattle were sourced from and how many cattle it was made from. She further noted that a McDonald's hamburger patty could be produced from 100 cattle. The Business Insider's Connie Chen, who tried a Crowd Cow "Farmers Market" box that had sirloin steaks, ground beef, bacon, and other meats, praised the meat for being "delicious and flavorful", liked the array of options, and enjoyed that she knew where the meat was sourced from. She concluded, "Crowd Cow gives you reliable, convenient access to the type of meat you want to be eating — raised with ethical and environmentally friendly standards by farmers and ranchers who care."

The Arizona Republic food critic Dominic Armato purchased a "Kagawa A5 olive Wagyu strip steak" through Crowd Cow. He said that while not everyone would like it, for those who do, "[t]he first time digging into a steak like this is one of those culinary moments that sticks with you forever. The experience was closer to devouring a slab of foie gras — a lightly crisped and salty surface that gave way to a wash of decadent beef fat." In a 2021 BestReviews article, Allen Foster praised the company, writing the "quality and flavor of the products are exceptional and delivery is timely". Foster said the company's cons were that customers were required to spend at least $50 for each order, shipping was not covered until customers spent at least $149, and customers needed to prepare in advance since shipping could take eight days after completing an order.

A growing number of consumers have wanted to eat grass-fed beef, which might encourage supermarkets to sell that type of meat. Brian Kateman, a professor at Columbia University's The Earth Institute, said, "If consumers find that grass-fed beef is available significantly less expensive from traditional retail sources, what will keep them buying from Crowd Cow? Coolness factor and convenience go only so far." In a report for The Counter, Marilyn Noble found that ranchers were losing money because of Crowd Cow's failure to comprehend the meat sector's quirks and its failure to convey information to the ranchers. She wrote that according to ranchers she interviewed, Crowd Cow "mined the meat community for connections and industry knowledge without making long-term investments, an approach that came to feel extractive when those relationships went sour".
