= Garret Cord Werner =

Architects and interior designers firm

Garret Cord Werner Architects & Interior Designers
- Company type: Private
- Industry: Architecture, Interior Design
- Founded: 1996
- Founder: Garret Cord Werner
- Headquarters: Seattle, Washington, United States
- Number of locations: Seattle, Washington; Vancouver, British Columbia
- Area served: North America
- Key people: Garret Cord Werner (Founder)
- Services: Architecture, Interior Design, Landscape Design, Historic Restoration
- Website: garretcordwerner.com

Garret Cord Werner Architects and Interior Designers is an American architects & interior designers firm known for reconstruction of historic places. Established in 1996, the firm maintains offices in Seattle, Washington, and Vancouver, British Columbia.

== Overview ==
The firm was founded in Seattle, Washington in 1996 by Garret Cord Werner with the intent to integrate architecture and interior design into a single, unified practice. Garret Cord Werner subsequently opened an office in Vancouver, Canada. Initially focused only on interior design, the firm later expanded to include residential, small commercial, and hospitality projects. Garret Cord Werner's design approach emphasizes addressing specific client requirements while incorporating aesthetic quality through careful craftsmanship. The firm also restores historic buildings, preserving their original character while incorporating contemporary elements and functionality.

Garret Cord Werner received the Rethinking The Future Award in 2024 for the Waterfront Pavilion project. In 2021, the firm was awarded Best in Residential Category at the International Interior Design Association Awards. Garret Cord Werner was included in Luxe Magazine's Gold List, as well as Future House Awards in 2018.

== Architectural composition and design elements ==
The firm’s design philosophy emphasizes clean lines, open layouts, and extensive use of natural materials, creating environments that fluidly transition between indoor and outdoor spaces with large windows and transparent boundaries to enhance spatial continuity and maximize natural lighting. The firm incorporates energy-efficient designs, eco-friendly materials, and environmentally conscious construction methods. Interiors typically include custom-designed furnishings, specialized lighting. Projects often incorporate water features, reflective surfaces, and calibrated natural-light strategies influenced by Japanese garden design traditions and historical architectural precedents such as the Pantheon.
