= Soundrangers =

Online sound and music library

- Type: Online Sound Library
- Industry: Interactive Media
- Founded: 1998
- Headquarters: Seattle, Washington, U.S.
- Key people: Barry Dowsett, Kevin Tone
- Products: High Definition Sound Effects and Music
- Website: Soundrangers.com

Soundrangers was the first online sound library of original sound effects and production music designed for specifically for interactive media such as video games, websites and interactive software. Soundrangers was also one of the first sound effects and music libraries to use instant streaming audition and automated delivery of sound files over the internet.

== Company history ==
Established in 1998 in Seattle, Washington, by Barry Dowsett and Kevin Tone. Working together in the recording industry as sound designers and musicians, they recognized the need for audio content designed for use and delivery over the internet. This use included the emerging world of interactive media and devices. Initially providing custom sound design and Foley for interactive and web based projects, within months of founding of the company, Soundrangers began developing and distributing a library of original sound effects and production music. This library was the first newly developed sound library created specifically for interactive media and available for audition and download over the internet.

As one of the earliest companies delivering sound files over the internet, Soundrangers was the first to use several features common today in the field of online sound libraries. Including instant streaming audition of individual sound files, automated delivery of content via download and selectable audio file formats.

== Video game titles ==
- Plants Vs Zombies Heroes – Electronic Arts (mobile)
- El Tigre Miracle City Meltdown – Nickelodeon (web)
- Lord of the Rings Tactics – Electronic Arts (psp)
- Lemony Snicket ‘A Series of Unfortunate Events’ – Activision (pc)
- Harry Potter and the Prisoner of Azkaban – Electronic Arts (pc)
- Polar Express Adventure – Postopia (web)
- Strawberry Blasted Skyglide – Postopia (web)
- Kiki’s Polar Icecaps – Postopia (web)
- Kung Fu Chaos – Microsoft Games Studios (Xbox)
- Static Shock – Cartoon Network (web)
- Dora’s Carnival Adventure – Nickelodeon (web)
- Mech Warrior 4 Vengeance – Microsoft Game Studios (Xbox)
- Combat Flight Sim 3 Battle for Europe – Microsoft Game Studios (pc)
- Combat Flight Sim 2 WWII Pacific Theater – Microsoft Game Studios (pc)
- Combat Flight Sim 1 WWII Europe Series – Microsoft Game Studios (pc)
- Phantom Dust – Microsoft Game Studios (Xbox)
- Microsoft Flight Sim 2004 ‘A Century of Flight’ – Microsoft Game Studios (pc)
- Microsoft Flight Sim 2000 – Microsoft Game Studios (pc)
- Microsoft Flight Sim 1998 – Microsoft Game Studios (pc)
- Various Card and Board games – MSN Game Zone (web)
