= Seattle Credit Union =

US credit union

- Company type: Credit union
- Industry: Financial services
- Founded: 1933
- Headquarters: Seattle, Washington, United States
- Number of locations: 9
- Area served: Seattle, Washington
- Products: Savings; checking; consumer loans; mortgages; credit cards; C&I loan; investments; online banking
- Total assets: $833,839,034
- Members: 46,733 members
- Website: seattlecu.com

Seattle Credit Union is a United States credit union headquartered in Seattle, Washington, chartered and regulated under the authority of the National Credit Union Administration (NCUA).

Seattle Credit Union is a lender for commercial, residential, and personal loans and mortgages, and is a credit card provider, and issues checking and savings accounts.

== History ==
Seattle Metropolitan Credit Union (DBA Seattle Credit Union) was founded by Seattle municipal employees in 1933 under the name City Credit Union, before taking its current name in 1997. In 2003 the credit union merged with the Teamsters' Credit Union, acquiring $11 million in assets, a 3,100 number new employees, and a single location on Seattle's Denny Way. Another merger took place in 2007 with Credit Union Northwest, and in 2015, the credit union merged with Northwest Baptist Federal Credit Union.

As of 2015, the chief executive officer of Seattle Credit Union is Richard Romero. In 2016 the company began offering loans for people to submit and maintain their citizenship applications. In 2017 the company dropped the “Metropolitan” from its official name, becoming Seattle Credit Union. At the same time, the company changed its logo and renovated some branches. That year they were also designated a Juntos Avanzamos institution.

== Locations ==
Seattle Credit Union's headquarters is located on 1st Avenue South in Seattle. In addition to its administrative headquarters, Seattle Credit Union operates eight branches in Beacon Hill, Burien, Downtown Seattle, Lynnwood, Northgate, Southcenter, and Tacoma.
