= Liquid 2 Ventures =

American venture capital firm

Liquid 2 Ventures, LLC
- Type: Private
- Industry: Venture Capital
- Founded: 2015; 11 years ago
- Founders: Joe Montana; Michael Ma; Michael Miller
- Headquarters: San Francisco, California, U.S.
- Key people: Joe Montana (Managing Partner)
- Website: www.liquid2.vc

Liquid 2 Ventures, LLC (Liquid 2) is an American venture capital firm based in San Francisco, California. The firm was founded by former National Football League quarterback Joe Montana.

== Background ==
After retiring from his football career, Joe Montana explored various business opportunities, dabbling in endorsements and smaller ventures. Eventually he entered the venture capital industry.

Montana teamed up with Ron Conway who owns the firm, SV Angel. Montana has credited his investment success to Conway stating he is one the top angel investor in the San Francisco Bay Area. Montana stated his best clutch performance in investing as of 2020 came when Conway at an event asked to Montana to write the biggest check ever for a company. Despite it being the biggest pressure moment for Montana, he decided to write the check for the company which was revealed to be Pinterest.

In 2015, Conway suggested that Montana start his own fund. Montana teamed up with Michael Ma who sold his startup TalkBin to Google in 2011 and Michael Miller who co-founded Cloudant that was sold to IBM in 2014. They started their early-stage fund with a trial run. They found a winning combination where Ma and Miller brought their entrepreneurial savvy and Y Combinator connections, while Montana contributed a feel for business with an unmatched rolodex. Eventually they launched their own firm, Liquid 2 Ventures, a wry nod to the illiquid nature of their investments. Its first fund raised around $25 million.

Despite there being a lot of competition in seed capital industry, one advantage Liquid 2 had was Montana using his fame could make introductions. For example, Montana helped connect portfolio companies to investors such as American Express and Snoop Dogg.

Within the company's first two years, Liquid quickly established itself as an elite seed fund. One of Liquid 2's first and most successful investments was in July 2015 where it was part of $1.5 million seed round in GitLab. In October GitLab held its initial public offering becoming a listed company on the Nasdaq. The investment was estimated to have a 420-fold return. Other early investments include Crowd Cow and Rappi. By 2017, Liquid 2 was among the ten most active seed funds in America. Liquid 2's first fund has 21 unicorns and a return of around 10 times its original investment.

== Investment strategy ==
Liquid 2 invests mainly in high-growth sector companies in the seed and Series A rounds. On average, it invests around $2.5 million per company. Its team focuses on finding companies that can disrupt industries and make significant impacts.

Liquid 2 is known to co-invest a lot with other parties such as GV, Bain Capital Ventures, and Y Combinator.
