= MyLackey.com =

Dot com company

MyLackey.com was a Dot-com company of the late 1990s, based in Seattle, Washington, United States. It was in founded in April 1999 by Brendan Barnicle and Brian McGarvey, two former executives of another Internet startup company, eChange. Among the venture capital firms investing in MyLackey.com was WaldenVC, which provided $6.5M in second-round funding.

== Business model ==
The company's business model involved arranging errands, such as car washing, dog-walking, shopping, and dry cleaning, for "busy professionals". The errands were carried out by local businesses that had signed contracts with MyLackey. As part of the arrangement, contractors were required to wear MyLackey livery when they carried out a MyLackey order. The contractors agreed that MyLackey would give them a smaller portion of the revenue than they would have received from an independent order, in exchange for the extra business. The end customers were charged the standard going rate for a certain service, and MyLackey retained the difference. The company's primary geographical focus was Seattle and Portland, Oregon.

== Leaked memo ==
Co-founder Brendan Barnicle became briefly infamous in June 2000 after an internal memorandum was leaked to FuckedCompany. In the memo (entitled "THIS IS STILL A START-UP") Barnicle complained: "It is now 6:45 pm and there are only 12 people in our office. We have 65 people that work here in Seattle. This is totally unacceptable." He went on to state: "until further notice, all employees are required to be at their desk from 8am until 7pm, with 30 minutes for lunch. There are no exceptions." A company spokesman subsequently denied that this final part of the memo was authentic.

The firm was a victim of the Dot-com bubble fallout, and closed its doors on October 20, 2000, after 16 months of operation. At the time of its closure the company employed 85 people. As of 2006, Brendan Barnicle is vice president and senior research analyst of Pacific Crest Securities’ enterprise application software practice., whilst co-founder Brian McGarvey is Senior Vice President of Member Experience at Hagerty.
