= CellNetix =

CellNetix, LLC
- Company type: Private
- Industry: Healthcare
- Founded: 2007
- Headquarters: Tukwila, Washington, U.S.
- Key people: Kathleen Fondren (Chief Executive Officer), Barry Kahn, M.D. (President, CellNetix Pathology & Laboratories), Greg Clark (Chief Financial Officer)
- Services: Anatomic Pathology
- Number of employees: 300+
- Website: www.cellnetix.com

CellNetix Pathology & Laboratories, LLC, headquartered in Tukwila, Washington, is a premier anatomic pathology provider in the Pacific Northwest, with 60 physicians and more than 300 total staff. Services include cytology, histology, fine needle aspiration (FNA) services, flow cytometry, immunohistochemistry, immunofluorescence, UroVysion™, and molecular diagnostics.

CellNetix institutes pollution prevention planning and receives technical assistance from Washington State Department of Ecology.

== Methods ==
CellNetix uses a subspecialized case allocation process in which specimens arrive in the pathology laboratory and staff allocate them by subspecialty: breast cases to breast pathologists, gastroenterology (GI) cases to GI pathologists, genitourinary cases (GU) cases to GU pathologists, etc. In a typical case allocation process in a non-specialized pathology practice, cases are manually allocated to pathologists based on workload, without regard to the type of case. Tests are interpreted by board-certified pathologists who have experience in breast core biopsies, GI biopsies, Pap tests, and prostate biopsies.

CellNetix is expanding the utilization of molecular biology to identify the root cause of abnormalities within the genetic material of the cell itself. The CellNetix molecular pathology department tests for breast, gastric, colon and lung cancers, as well as melanoma. A women's health subspecialty provides high-risk HPV testing, testing for the detection of Neisseria gonorrhoeae (GC) and Chlamydia trachomatis (CT), as well as vaginosis/vaginitis testing.

== Technology ==
CellNetix uses a specimen tracking system in which each specimen is labeled with a bar code and scanned up to 15 times during transit—from pickup at the hospital or clinic, to arrival at the lab, to final report.

Early in 2012, the company invested in whole-slide imaging which views a live capture of the slide on a microscope. This is done using an ultra-high resolution scanner to image the complete slides and store them digitally.

CellNetix spent 6 months validating WSI for use in diagnostic processes. It is now in daily use for digital IHC reads by pathologists at remote locations. They are also using WSI for HER2/neu diagnosis after a lengthy validation (comparing diagnosis by glass slide vs. digital image) for many cases by different pathologists. [5]

== History ==
CellNetix is a physician- and employee-owned partnership formed in 2005 by the merger of three independent pathology groups—Black Hills Pathology (Olympia), Associated Pathology (Everett) and Washington Pathology Consultants (Seattle), with the addition of Northwest Pathology Group in 2008.

In 2007, CellNetix opened a 48,000-square-foot pathology and laboratory facility in downtown Seattle, where most of the testing is conducted. CellNetix provides diagnostic services for nine hospitals across western Washington as well as physicians and patients in Washington and Alaska.

On December 4, 2012, Spokane, Wash.-based PAML (Pathology Associates Medical Laboratories) and CellNetix signed a letter of intent in which PAML agreed to purchase a minority ownership interest in CellNetix, LLC. As part of this partnership, CellNetix and PAML will form a jointly owned molecular pathology esoteric testing division. PAML employs approximately 1,400 staff and is 75% owned by Providence Health & Services and 25% by CHI (Catholic Health Initiative). By agreement, PAML and CellNetix will have a seat on each other's boards.

On May 2, 2013, PAML and CellNetix announced that PAML had completed a minority investment in the technical laboratory business division owned by CellNetix. The two companies also stated that they entered into an agreement to work together to form a “jointly owned national Esoteric Anatomic Pathology reference laboratory offering.”

On February 28, 2017, just a week after Laboratory Corp. of America Holdings announced its plan to buy PAML, CellNetix bought back the 22% minority share from PAML to regain complete ownership. With this transaction, CellNetix Pathology and Laboratories became one of the largest independent, pathologist-owned groups in the country.
