= Allied Marble & Granite =

Stone company

Allied Marble & Granite Inc.
- Headquarters: Seattle, Washington
- Owner: Quang Mai
- Number of employees: 22
- Website: alliedmarbleinc.com

Allied Marble & Granite Inc. is a private company based in Seattle, Washington known for its West Coast residential and commercial manufactured stone product installations.

== History ==
Quang Mai is the owner of Allied Marble and Jimmy Mai serves as the company's executive vice president. The company was founded by Mai's father. Mai and his brother moved Allied Marble to Seattle in 1982.

== Award ==
Allied Marble won first place in the small company category of the 2013 Washington's Best Workplaces competition.
