= Lars Nilsson =

Lars Nilsson may refer to:

- Lasse Nilsson (born 1982), Swedish footballer
- Lars Nilsson (designer) (born 1966), Swedish fashion designer
- Lars Nilsson (shaman) (fl. 1691–1693), Sami shaman
- Lars Nilsson (volleyball) (born 1965), Swedish volleyball player

== See also ==
- Lars Fredrik Nilson (1840–1899), Swedish chemist
