= CarDomain =

Automotive website

CarDomain Network, Inc.
- Company type: Subsidiary
- Industry: Internet
- Founded: Seattle, Washington (Sep 21, 1998)
- Headquarters: Seattle, Washington
- Key people: Alex Algard, Founder and CEO
- Products: Online community, Electronic commerce
- Parent: Motor Trend Group
- Website: www.cardomain.com

CarDomain.com was an online community site for car enthusiasts. Users could create profiles of their cars including pictures and write-ups, view the work of others, talk to the other users and car enthusiasts, and create social network profiles.

== History ==
CarDomain Network was founded in 1998 by Alex Algard and Simon Han and is headquartered in Seattle, Washington. The company started as SoundDomain.com, which featured a mobile electronics forum and community functionality allowing users to show off their car stereo installations. As the site matured, additional features were added and, eventually, the vehicle profiles were rebranded as CarDomain. Recently, CarDomain has added video upload and user-run groups.

"At the end of 2004, the company had revenue of $13.3 million, and now has 70 employees and 1.5 million registered users".

"Seattle startup CarDomain, a social-networking site for auto enthusiasts, cut 16 jobs (about half its staff) on November 18, 2008. “Although we are growing overall traffic and member engagement year-on-year, the economy and the automotive industry have taken a significant turn for the worse, leading to very pessimistic industry projections of advertising budgets and a protracted recovery period,” said CEO Rajan Krishnamurty, in a statement to TechFlash."

== Acquisition ==
On April 8, 2009 CarDomain acquired fellow automotive social-networking site StreetFire, at that time, one of the largest user-generated content sites for automotive videos. CEO of StreetFire, Glenn Rogers, became CEO of the combined company.

In 2012 CarDomain was sold to Source Interlink Media, a company that owns a number of other car-oriented publications. (Source Interlink was subsequently renamed TEN: The Enthusiast Network, then Motor Trend Group.)
