= 2016 Utah gubernatorial election =

- November 8, 2016
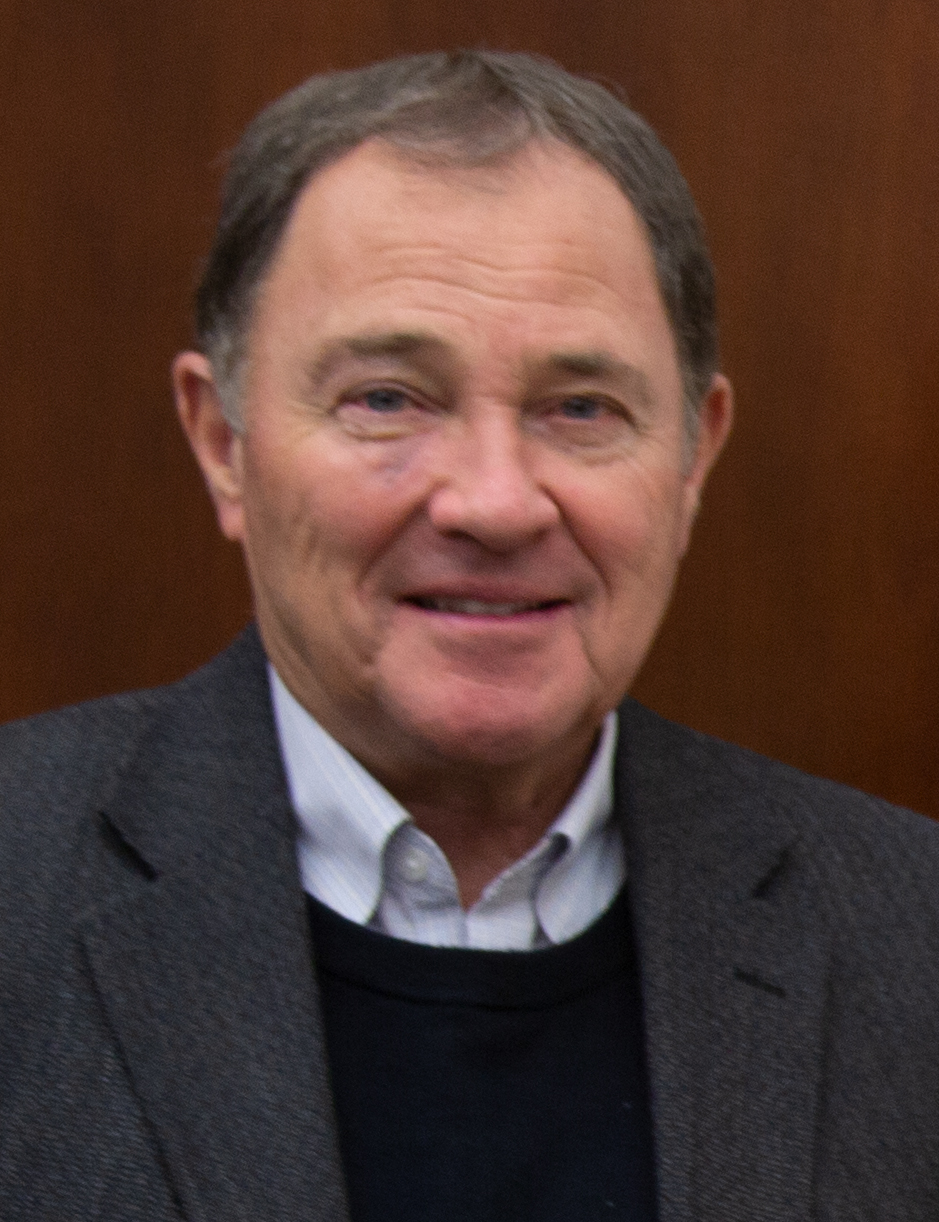

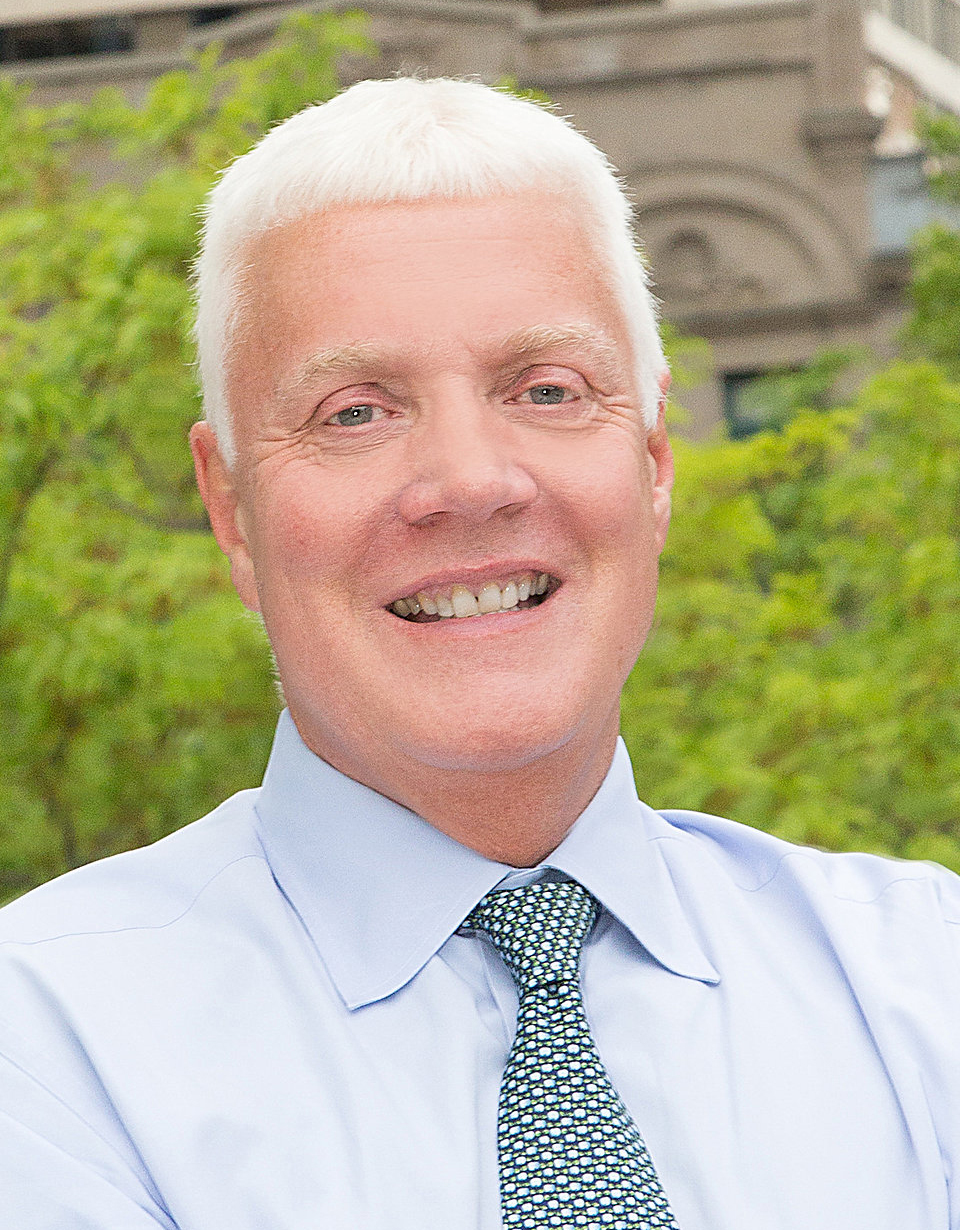
Nominee	Gary Herbert	Mike Weinholtz
Party	Republican	Democratic
Running mate	Spencer Cox	Kim Bowman
Popular vote	750,850	323,349
Percentage	66.74%	28.74%
- Herbert: 40–50% 50–60% 60–70% 70–80% 80–90% >90% Weinholtz: 40–50% 50–60% 60–70% 70–80% 80–90% >90% Tie: 40–50% 50% No data
Governor before election
Gary Herbert
Republican
Elected Governor
Gary Herbert
Republican

The 2016 Utah gubernatorial election was held on November 8, 2016, to elect the governor and lieutenant governor of Utah, concurrently with the 2016 U.S. presidential election, as well as elections to the United States Senate and elections to the United States House of Representatives and various state and local elections.

Incumbent Republican governor Gary Herbert ran for re-election to a second full term in office. Republican challenger Jonathan E. Johnson defeated Herbert in the state convention to secure a spot on the primary ballot, but Herbert won the June 28, 2016 primary and secured the nomination. The Democratic party nominated former CHG Healthcare Services CEO Mike Weinholtz at the Utah Democratic convention in April.

Herbert won the general election, defeating Weinholtz by a large margin.

== Background ==
Republican Governor Jon Huntsman, Jr. resigned in August 2009 to become United States Ambassador to China and Lieutenant Governor Herbert succeeded him. He was elected to serve out the remainder of Huntsman's term in a 2010 special election and was re-elected to a full four-year term in 2012.

== Republican nomination ==
Former Speaker of the Utah House of Representatives Rebecca D. Lockhart was widely believed to be a potential Republican candidate, but she died of a rare neurodegenerative brain disease in January 2015.

Incumbent governor Gary Herbert won the June 28, 2016 primary, defeating Overstock.com Chairman Jonathan Johnson.

=== Candidates ===
==== Declared ====
- Gary Herbert, incumbent governor
- Jonathan "JJ" Johnson, businessman and chairman of the board of Overstock.com

=== Polling ===
Poll source	Date(s) administered	Sample size	Margin of error	Gary Herbert	Jonathan Johnson	Undecided
SurveyUSA	June 6–8, 2016	517	± 4.1%	69%	24%	6%

=== Results ===
Republican primary results
Party	Candidate	Votes	%
Republican	Gary Herbert (incumbent)	176,866	71.75%
Republican	Jonathan Johnson	69,663	28.25%
Total votes		246,529	100.00%

== Democratic nomination ==
Weinholtz defeated Cook at the Democratic convention to become the nominee.

=== Candidates ===
==== Declared ====
- Mike Weinholtz, former chairman and CEO of CHG Healthcare Services

==== Withdrew ====
- Vaughn R Cook, founder and CEO of ZYTO Technologies

==== Declined ====
- Ed Allen, former state senator
- Jim Dabakis, State Senator and former chairman of the Utah Democratic Party
- Jim Matheson, former U.S. representative
- Ben McAdams, Mayor of Salt Lake County and former state senator

== General election ==
=== Debate ===
2016 Utah gubernatorial election debate
No.	Date	Host	Moderator	Link	Republican	Democratic
Key: P Participant A Absent N Not invited I Invited W Withdrawn						
Key: P Participant A Absent N Not invited I Invited W Withdrawn					Gary Herbert	Mike Weinholtz
1	Sep. 26, 2016	Utah Debate Commission	Kerry Bringhurst		P	P

=== Predictions ===
Source	Ranking	As of
The Cook Political Report	Safe R	August 12, 2016
Daily Kos	Safe R	November 8, 2016
Rothenberg Political Report	Safe R	November 3, 2016
Sabato's Crystal Ball	Safe R	November 7, 2016
Real Clear Politics	Safe R	November 1, 2016
Governing	Safe R	October 27, 2016

=== Polling ===
Poll source	Date(s) administered	Sample size	Margin of error	Gary Herbert (R)	Mike Weinholtz (D)	Other	Undecided
SurveyMonkey	November 1–7, 2016	1,479	± 4.6%	58%	38%	—	4%
SurveyMonkey	Oct 31–Nov 6, 2016	1,428	± 4.6%	59%	38%	—	3%
Y2 Analytics→	November 1–3, 2016	500	± 4.4%	64%	26%	5%	5%
SurveyMonkey	Oct 28–Nov 3, 2016	1,327	± 4.6%	60%	37%	—	3%
Monmouth University	Oct 30–Nov 2, 2016	402	± 4.9%	63%	30%	5%	2%
SurveyMonkey	Oct 27–Nov 2, 2016	1,247	± 4.6%	60%	36%	—	4%
SurveyMonkey	Oct 26–Nov 1, 2016	1,057	± 4.6%	61%	34%	—	5%
SurveyMonkey	October 25–31, 2016	1,078	± 4.6%	61%	35%	—	4%
UtahPolicy/Dan Jones	October 12–18, 2016	818	± 3.4%	64%	25%	6%	5%
Monmouth University	October 10–12, 2016	403	± 4.9%	63%	30%	2%	5%
UtahPolicy/Dan Jones	September 1–9, 2016	605	± 4.0%	62%	24%	6%	7%
Public Policy Polling	August 19–21, 2016	1,018	± 3.1%	57%	21%	7%	14%
SurveyUSA	June 6–8, 2016	1,238	± 2.8%	55%	34%	4%	6%
Gravis Marketing	May 31–June 1, 2016	1,519	± 2.5%	56%	29%	15%	—

- → Internal poll conducted on behalf of the Utah Republican Party.
Hypothetical polling

with Jonathan Johnson

Poll source	Date(s) administered	Sample size	Margin of error	Jonathan Johnson (R)	Mike Weinholtz (D)	Other	Undecided
SurveyUSA	June 6–8, 2016	1,238	± 2.8%	38%	35%	9%	17%
Gravis Marketing	May 31–June 1, 2016	1,519	± 2.5%	40%	29%	31%	—

with Jim Matheson

Poll source	Date(s) administered	Sample size	Margin of error	Gary Herbert (R)	Jim Matheson (D)	Other	Undecided
UtahPolicy/Dan Jones	March 30–April 7, 2015	601	± 4.0%	57%	33%	—	11%

=== Results ===

2016 Utah gubernatorial election
Party	Candidate	Votes	%	±%
Republican	Gary Herbert (incumbent)	750,850	66.74%	−1.67%
Democratic	Mike Weinholtz	323,349	28.74%	+1.16%
Libertarian	Brian Kamerath	34,827	3.10%	+0.85%
Independent American	Superdell Schanze	15,912	1.41%	
Write-in	L. S. Brown	97	0.01%	
Total votes		1,125,035	100.0%	
Majority		427,501	38.00%	
Republican hold		Swing	-2.83%	

=== Results by county ===
County	Gary Herbert Republican		Mike Weinholtz Democratic		Brian Kamerath Libertarian		Superdell Schanze Independent American		L. S. Brown Write-in		Margin		Total votes cast
County	#	%	#	%	#	%	#	%	#	%	#	%	Total votes cast
Beaver	2,033	82.44%	324	13.14%	63	2.55%	46	1.87%	0	0.00%	1,709	69.30%	2,466
Box Elder	16,084	81.89%	2,564	13.05%	635	3.23%	357	1.82%	0	0.00%	13,520	68.84%	19,640
Cache	34,553	75.37%	9,025	19.69%	1,581	3.45%	681	1.49%	7	0.02%	25,528	55.68%	45,847
Carbon	5,574	70.29%	2,034	25.65%	180	2.27%	142	1.79%	0	0.00%	3,540	44.64%	7,930
Daggett	351	74.36%	104	22.03%	12	2.54%	5	1.06%	0	0.00%	247	52.33%	472
Davis	101,402	73.17%	30,720	22.17%	4,498	3.25%	1,946	1.40%	15	0.01%	70,682	51.00%	138,581
Duchesne	5,837	84.33%	715	10.33%	219	3.16%	151	2.18%	0	0.00%	5,122	74.00%	6,922
Emery	3,638	85.32%	483	11.33%	61	1.43%	82	1.92%	0	0.00%	3,155	73.99%	4,264
Garfield	1,888	80.72%	378	16.16%	47	2.01%	26	1.11%	0	0.00%	1,510	64.56%	2,339
Grand	2,266	49.92%	2,067	45.54%	156	3.44%	50	1.10%	0	0.00%	199	4.38%	4,539
Iron	13,646	78.13%	2,597	14.87%	862	4.94%	360	2.06%	1	0.01%	11,049	63.26%	17,466
Juab	3,483	84.21%	487	11.77%	110	2.66%	56	1.35%	0	0.00%	2,996	72.44%	4,136
Kane	2,589	74.63%	729	21.01%	93	2.68%	58	1.67%	0	0.00%	1,860	53.62%	3,469
Millard	4,455	85.46%	534	10.24%	145	2.78%	74	1.42%	5	0.10%	3,921	75.22%	5,213
Morgan	4,304	83.22%	629	12.16%	158	3.05%	81	1.57%	0	0.00%	3,675	71.06%	5,172
Piute	630	88.11%	54	7.55%	18	2.52%	13	1.82%	0	0.00%	576	80.56%	715
Rich	948	85.10%	122	10.95%	20	1.80%	24	2.15%	0	0.00%	826	74.15%	1,114
Salt Lake	218,570	52.44%	181,462	43.53%	11,671	2.80%	5,094	1.22%	30	0.01%	37,108	8.90%	416,827
San Juan	3,188	58.59%	1,975	36.30%	149	2.74%	129	2.37%	0	0.00%	1,213	22.29%	5,441
Sanpete	8,701	85.50%	1,033	10.15%	244	2.40%	197	1.94%	2	0.02%	7,688	75.35%	10,177
Sevier	7,305	85.11%	903	10.52%	188	2.19%	176	2.05%	11	0.13%	6,402	74.59%	8,583
Summit	9,595	46.89%	10,162	49.67%	541	2.64%	163	0.80%	0	0.00%	-567	-2.77%	20,461
Tooele	15,030	69.27%	5,425	25.00%	752	3.47%	484	2.23%	6	0.03%	9,605	44.27%	21,697
Uintah	10,697	84.15%	1,388	10.92%	408	3.21%	218	1.71%	1	0.01%	9,309	73.23%	12,712
Utah	162,178	81.19%	28,469	14.25%	6,368	3.19%	2,720	1.36%	14	0.01%	133,709	66.94%	199,749
Wasatch	8,552	70.63%	3,125	25.81%	291	2.40%	140	1.16%	0	0.00%	5,427	44.82%	12,108
Washington	47,202	77.19%	10,565	17.28%	2,256	3.69%	1,125	1.84%	3	0.00%	36,637	59.91%	61,151
Wayne	1,108	78.25%	275	19.42%	19	1.34%	14	0.99%	0	0.00%	833	58.83%	1,416
Weber	55,043	65.20%	25,001	29.61%	3,082	3.65%	1,300	1.54%	2	0.00%	30,042	35.58%	84,428
Total	750,850	66.74%	323,349	28.74%	34,827	3.10%	15,912	1.41%	97	0.01%	427,501	38.00%	1,125,035

==== Counties that flipped from Republican to Democratic ====
- Summit (largest municipality: Park City)

=== Results by congressional district ===
Herbert won all four congressional districts.

District	Herbert	Weinholtz	Representative
1st	71%	24%	Rob Bishop
2nd	62%	33%	Chris Stewart
3rd	72%	24%	Jason Chaffetz
4th	61%	34%	Mia Love
