= Patrick M. Byrne =

Former president, CEO and chairman of Overstock.com

Patrick Byrne
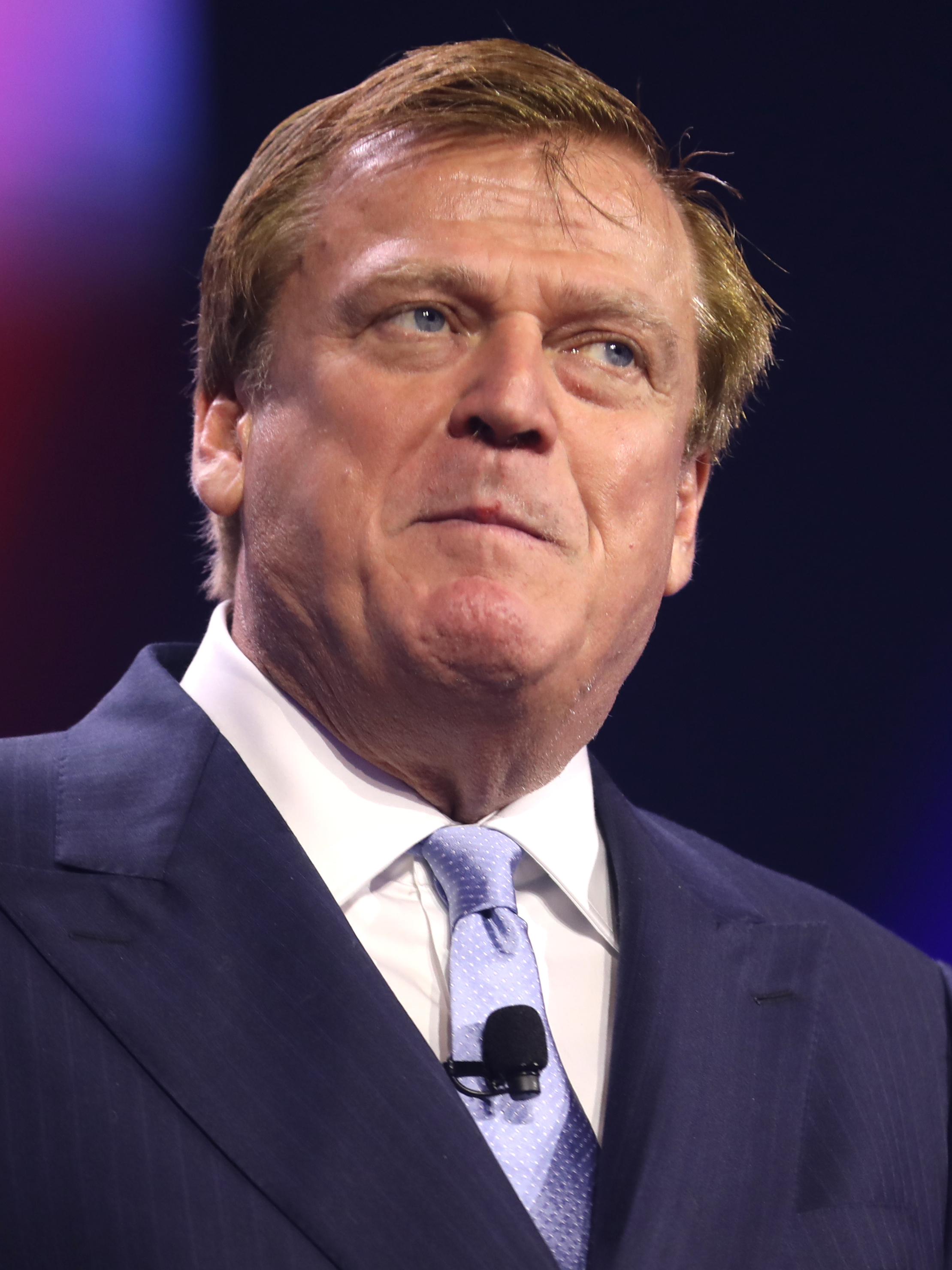
- Byrne in 2023
- Born: Patrick Michael Byrne; November 29, 1962 (age 63); Fort Wayne, Indiana, U.S.
- Education: Dartmouth College (BA); King's College, Cambridge (MA); Stanford University (PhD)
- Known for: Former Chairman and CEO of Overstock.com
- Father: John J. Byrne
- Website: patrickbyrne.com

Patrick Michael Byrne (born November 29, 1962) is an American businessman, promoter of conspiracy theories, and libertarian noted for his views on public education and blockchain.

In 1999, Byrne launched Overstock.com (currently Beyond, Inc.) after leading two smaller companies. Byrne led Overstock as chief executive officer for two decades, from 1999 to 2019. In 2002, Byrne took Overstock public using the Dutch auction method, which was then novel.

Early in his Overstock tenure, Byrne attracted public attention for a long-running legal battle against naked short selling. Later, he resigned as CEO in August 2019, following revelations that he had been in an intimate relationship with Russian agent (and later politician) Maria Butina.

Since then Byrne has emerged as a leading figure in promoting conspiracy theories, including the "Deep State" conspiracy theory. In 2020 and 2021, he repeatedly promoted false claims that Donald Trump had lost the 2020 U.S. presidential election due to "election fraud". He has also toured the United States in order to provide anti-vaccination stump speeches for COVID-19 conspiracy theorists. He became notable for distributing and selling misinformation on various subject matters via websites, social media, books, and film. He has suffered legal consequences for his misinformation activities.

== Early life and education ==
Byrne was born on November 29, 1962, in Fort Wayne, Indiana. He grew up in Woodstock, Vermont and Hanover, New Hampshire. He is the son of John J. Byrne, former chairman of Berkshire Hathaway's GEICO insurance subsidiary and White Mountains Insurance Group.

Byrne graduated from Dartmouth College with a Bachelor of Arts in philosophy and Asian studies. He then won a Marshall Scholarship to pursue graduate studies in England at the University of Cambridge, where he earned a master's degree from King's College, Cambridge. In 1996, he earned his Ph.D. in philosophy from Stanford University. His doctoral dissertation, completed under the philosopher of science John Dupré, was titled, "Jealousy and confidence: An essay on the limits of authority".

== Business career ==
=== Early business career ===
While Byrne was a teaching fellow at Stanford University from 1989 to 1991, he was manager of Blackhawk Investment Co. and Elissar, Inc. He was chairman, CEO, president of Centricut, LLC, a manufacturer of industrial torches from 1994 to 1997. From 1997 to 1998, he held the same three positions at Fechheimer Brothers, Inc., a Berkshire Hathaway company that manufactured uniforms for the police, firefighters, and the military. His father was a friend of Warren Buffett, the leader of Berkshire Hathaway.

=== Overstock.com ===
==== Career and tenure as CEO ====
In 1999, after leading two smaller companies, including operating a set of Berkshire Hathaway's domestic companies, Byrne was approached by the founder of D2-Discounts Direct with a request for operating capital. The company had generated slightly more than $500,000 in revenue the previous year by liquidating excess furniture inventory online, but was out of capital and shutting its doors. Byrne found the idea of online closeouts intriguing, and in the spring of 1999 invested $7 million for a 60 percent equity stake in the company. In September the same year he took over as CEO, and the following month the company was renamed Overstock.com.

Byrne initiated an IPO of Overstock.com in 2002, becoming one of the first companies to go public under the "Dutch auction" method, a system advanced by WR Hambrecht + Co to retain a greater share of capital within the company rather than going to the investment bank underwriters used in conventional public offerings. Byrne has said that competing banks reacted against this, attempting to obstruct the success of the offering through negative reports and by shorting the company's stock. When Google later in 2004 went public via a Dutch auction IPO, Byrne commented that Wall Street firms similarly pushed negative stories, but did not keep it from going forward successfully. Four years after the OpenIPO, one official of Hambrecht, its now former co-CEO Clay Corbus was added to Overstock's board of directors. As a part of his role, Byrne advocated for the use of blockchain technology, including cryptocurrencies such as bitcoin.

Some Overstock employees, as well as Byrne's father, initially believed that Byrne's long-running campaign against short sellers, which began in 2005, distracted him from Overstock's core business. The company had losses in some years, and modest profits in others. Byrne's tenure was marked by a series of initiatives that were rolled out with much enthusiasm, but that were later abandoned or had disappointing outcomes. In 2004, Overstock spent several million dollars to establish an online auction platform to compete with eBay, but the project was not successful and shut down in 2011. The company also launched, and then later closed, projects in real estate, travel booking, and auto sales. He took an indefinite leave of absence from Overstock.com in April 2016 because of Hepatitis C complications, and he returned in July 2016 as CEO after his recovery. The company increasingly lost ground to other e-commerce retailers, especially Amazon and Wayfair; by the time of his resignation in 2019, Byrne had largely given up trying to compete with these larger rivals; he led, beginning in 2017, unsuccessful attempts to find a buyer for Overstock's retail business. In the late 2010s, Overstock built a new $100 million headquarters at the base of Utah's Wasatch Mountains, although several rounds of layoffs had left part of the complex empty.

In 2013, Byrne began to invest in cryptocurrency and blockchain, and Overstock became the first major retailer to accept Bitcoin as a form of payment. Byrne shifted some of Overstock's balance sheet to support Tzero, a new digital stock exchange billed as a "blockchain version of Nasdaq; Tzero's initial coin offering in 2018. In 2022, Intercontinental Exchange acquired a minority stake in tZERO.

As Byrne's focus on the technology intensified in 2017 and 2018, Overstock incurred significant losses—$316 million over two years, more than twice the profits ever made by the company.

==== Campaign against naked shorting and analysts ====
In a conference call with analysts in August 2005, Byrne said that "there's been a plan since we were in our teens to destroy our stock, drive it down to $6–$10 ... and even a plan for how the company would then get whacked up." He said that the conspirators were part of a "Miscreants Ball," headed by a "Sith Lord," whom he identified only as "he's one of the master criminals from the 1980s." (but identified in an interview two weeks later as Steve Cohen). Byrne said the conspiracy included hedge funds, journalists, investigators, trial lawyers, the SEC, and Eliot Spitzer.

In 2005, Overstock.com sued hedge fund Rocker Partners and the equities research firm Gradient Analytics (formerly Camelback Research Alliance) in California, alleging they illegally colluded in short-selling the company while paying for negative reports to drive down share prices. Gradient countersued Overstock for libel. A portion of this suit was settled out of court in 2008; Overstock and Gradient dropped their claims against each other after Gradient retracted allegations that Overstock's reporting methods did not comply with rules established by the FASB, stated they believed Overstock.com complied with GAAP standards, and that three directors were independent, and apologized. In December 2009, the suit against Rocker, whose name had since been changed to Copper River Partners, was settled by Copper River paying $5 million.

In 2007, Overstock filed a second lawsuit against a number of large investment banks, alleging that the brokers engaged in illegal naked short selling. The long-running litigation ended in 2016. Overstock's claims against Goldman Sachs were dismissed, but the other brokers, such as Merrill Lynch, settled for $20 million.

Fortune writer Bethany McLean said that Byrne had become a "hero to those who believe that short-sellers are the operators of Wall Street's ultimate black box, predators who destroy companies through innuendo, bullying, political connections—and sometimes through an illegal practice known as 'naked shorting.'" Byrne financed and wrote a full-page advertisement in The Washington Post which said "Naked short selling ... is literally stealing money from the widows, retirees, and other small investors." In a letter to The Wall Street Journal in April 2006, Byrne contended that "blackguards have practiced 'failure to deliver'" of securities, were "destroying businesses and (probably) destabilizing our capital markets." Between 2005 and 2007, Overstock filed two lawsuits relating to the matters under Byrne's direction. After her article appeared in 2005, McLean was attacked by Byrne with such vehemence that she ceased covering him.

Byrne's campaign against naked short selling and others who he feels targeted him and his company attracted both controversy and praise. In addition to criticizing broker-dealers and hedge funds as corrupt, Byrne also criticized the press as corrupt and unable to understand the financial and dot.com industries, and complained that the mainstream media had "demonized" him.

==== Deep Capture ====
In part to publicize his thoughts on naked short selling, Byrne founded the website "Deep Capture". In October 2011, Vancouver businessman Altaf Nazerali sued Byrne for libel and defamation in the Supreme Court of British Columbia for articles published on the website. The articles described Nazerali as being involved with "Osama Bin Laden's favorite financier," and that he worked with criminal syndicates including the Colombian drug cartel, the Russian mafia, and various "jihadi terrorist groups" including al Qaeda's Golden Chain. Deep Capture also accused Nazerali of "delivering weapons to war zones in Africa and to the mujahedeen in Afghanistan," of orchestrating "small-time 'pump and dump' scams… [and] bust-outs, death spiral finance and naked short selling," and of carrying out dirty work for "a Pakistani ISI asset" who "works for the Iranian regime." In May 2016, the Court found that the allegations in the Deep Capture articles were libelous and defamatory; Nazerali was awarded $1.2 million in damages, including $500,000 in aggravated damages, $250,000 in punitive damages and $55,000 in special damages. Byrne was permanently banned from publishing these accusations. The Court found Byrne, his employee Mark Mitchell, and Deep Capture "engaged in a calculated and ruthless campaign to inflict as much damage on Mr. Nazerali's reputation as they could achieve." The 102-page decision said "It is clear on the evidence that their intention was to conduct a vendetta in which the truth about Mr. Nazerali himself was of no consequence."

The judgment was upheld on appeal in Canada in August 2018.

==== Relationship with Maria Butina and resignation as CEO ====
In 2019, Byrne announced that he was resigning in order to come forward about his involvement with the Deep State. Byrne claimed that he had had a lifelong relationship with the US government, and in that service he had been involved in the investigation of a corrupt federal official (whom he subsequently identified as Hillary Clinton), and been directed to develop a romantic relationship with Russian agent Maria Butina. Byrne claimed that insurer fears about Byrne's "personality and public comments" made the firm uninsurable, and as a result he was leaving the firm.

Byrne resigned his board seat and position as CEO of Overstock.com on August 22, 2019, and Jonathan E. Johnson was appointed CEO by the board.

While throughout Byrne's tenure at Overstock investors opposed Byrne's leadership style, he did not experience an activist shareholder campaign and maintained that his departure was voluntary, rather than forced by the corporation's board.

Byrne sold some of his Overstock stock over the course of 2019, but still remained the company's largest shareholder, with a 14% stake. However, one month after resigning to go public about these federal matters, at the request of board of directors to sever all ties with Overstock, Byrne sold his entire stake in company (more than 4.7 million shares, about $90 million). Byrne wrote on his blog that he would invest the proceeds in gold, silver, and two cryptocurrencies; criticized what he claimed to be "acts of retaliation from the Deep State"; and attacked the SEC as "the Deep State's pets."

After Butina's release from prison, she became involved in Russian national politics. Byrne continued to send her financial gifts, which in 2021 led members of the Russian political opposition to object to her running for political office based on her "foreign financial backing". The "gifts" were investigated in the US by the Business Insider, and Byrne admitted to them, when her candidacy with Vladimir Putin's party United Russia became public.

== Political involvement ==
=== Pre-2020 ===
Byrne was the largest donor to political causes in Utah during 2003–2006 (giving at least $676,500), his father Jack Byrne was the third-largest, giving (with $510,800). Patrick Byrne was the fourth largest Utah individual donor to Republicans and the fifth largest individual Utah donor to Democrats during the time period. The father-and-son pair each gave a half-million dollars in 2004 for ads attacking Democratic vice presidential nominee John Edwards, and Patrick Byrne also gave $2,500 to Swift Vets and POWs for Truth, a group that attacked the Vietnam War service of Senator John Kerry, the 2004 Democratic presidential nominee. Nonetheless, Patrick Byrne gave $25,300 to the Utah Democratic Party, $25,000 to the Democratic Senatorial Campaign Committee, and $1,000 to Democratic congressman Jim Matheson.

=== Promotion of falsehoods regarding 2020 presidential election ===
In 2020, Byrne promoted President Donald Trump's claim that he actually won the U.S. presidential election; Trump, the Republican incumbent, was defeated by Democratic candidate Joe Biden. Along with Steve Bannon and Lin Wood, among others, Byrne was a leading figure in an assortment of allies gathered by Trump to amplify his false conspiracy theory claims during his months-long effort to subvert the election results and cling to power.

Over a series of months, Byrne repeatedly promoted conspiracy claims about the 2020 election results, including in Florida, Texas, and Georgia, pushing the falsehoods at public rallies and on Twitter, variously claiming that Biden, election technology companies, China, or other foreign powers engaged in an elaborate scheme to "steal" the election.

=== December 2020 meeting with Trump ===
The Daily Beast wrote of Byrne's association with Trump that he "became one of the strangest characters of the last days of the Trump administration, visiting the White House in December, dressed in jeans and a hoodie, scarfing down meatballs, and bickering with Trump's legal team and administration officials, as he, Flynn, and Powell together pitched the then-president on their democracy-thwarting schemes." On December 18, 2020, Byrne visited the White House, where he met with Trump, Sidney Powell, lawyer and former Trump administration official Emily Newman, and Trump's former National Security Advisor Mike Flynn. During a meeting with Trump in the Oval Office, the four promoted their unsubstantiated fraud claims to Trump and sought to develop a plan to try to overturn Trump's election loss, which had occurred more than a month before and been formalized four days before with the Electoral College vote.

The four met Trump without the appointment appearing on Trump's private schedule, and Trump's White House staff had apparently not been informed about the meeting. After encountering opposition during their visit from some Trump officials, such as White House Counsel Pat Cipollone, Byrne later claimed that Trump's advisors were insufficiently loyal to him and were "mendacious mediocrities" who "want him to lose and are lying to him." In a Twitter post, he advised Trump and his allies to "Trust Rudy [Giuliani] and Sidney [Powell] only." Byrne said that he entered the White House on a bluff—"without any invitation"—and describing the quartet's plan as using Powell and Flynn's fame to "bullshit our way past" White House security to get to Trump. According to Byrne, he had enlisted a White House staffer's help in entering the compound, but Byrne "may have been less than clear that there would be some people with" him. During this time, Byrne had hired private jets to fly members of the Proud Boys and other members of far-right groups to Washington DC in order to engage over tactics for overturning the 2020 election. In August 2023, his involvement at the White House meeting led CNN to name him as the potential identity of one of the thirty unindicted co-conspirators numbered in the indictment leading to the Georgia election racketeering prosecution. Byrne's White House meeting with Powell and others was further spotlighted in news coverage of Powell's guilty plea in the Georgia case.

=== January 2021 attack on the Capitol ===
Byrne was a speaker at the Trump rally on January 6 in Washington, D.C., which was directly followed by a pro-Trump mob, inflamed by Trump's false election claims, attacking the U.S. Capitol. Soon afterward, Twitter suspended Byrne's account. In July 2022, Byrne agreed to testify before Congress during the United States House Select Committee on the January 6 Attack public hearings on his role in the events leading up to the insurrection. News of the meeting led further news organizations, such as the Washington Post, to publish lengthy profiles of Byrne's election denier activities. In 2023, Byrne implied that he had damaging material on Jack Smith after he was named the special counsel into Trump related criminal matters in social media posts that he later removed.

=== Republican audit of the 2020 Arizona state ballot count ===
In April 2021, Byrne became the leading financier of the controversial Arizona State Senate Republicans' botched audit of the presidential vote in Maricopa County, Arizona. Biden won Maricopa County (and the State of Arizona), and the result was confirmed multiple times. Nonetheless, in a bid to try to support Trump's lies about the election, the Arizona Senate's Republican leadership, led by Senate President Karen Fann, launched an audit of the county's election results, run by a small Trump-aligned company called Cyber Ninjas, which has no experience in election audits and is led by a CEO who had previously promoted the false claim that the election was rigged. The haphazard, highly politicized audit process failed to follow standard recounting procedures and was condemned by election experts, Democrats, and some Republicans, including the Republican-dominated Maricopa County Board of Supervisors, who wrote that Arizona Republicans "rented out the once-good name of the Arizona Senate" to "grifters" who were perpetrating a "sham."

Byrne claimed that he had pledged $1 million for his "Fund the Audit" campaign; The America Project, a Florida-based group of which Byrne is CEO and founder, claimed that it raised a total of $1.7 million to support the "audit," including funds sent by social media followers in support of the cause. Byrne stated that he had aspirations to spread his activities to additional counties in other states. In addition to raising money, the group helped to recruit volunteers to count ballots and coordinate with the Arizona state Senate Republicans. Jeff Flake, a former Republican U.S. Senator from Arizona, said Byrne's involvement undermined the "credibility" of the process, adding, "It's damaging to the Republican party and our system of government."

In late September 2021, the results of the ballot count were released, showing that Biden did indeed win the county - with a potentially larger margin than originally counted. Following the release of the report, Byrne doubled down on trying to find other reasons to keep his conspiracy theory afloat, as NBC News published that Byrne was profiting from the continued false accusations of election insecurity.

=== Financing and promoting claims in blog, books, media, organizations, and film ===
In 2021, Byrne self-published his book The Deep Rig: How Election Fraud Cost Donald J. Trump the White House, By a Man Who Did Not Vote for Him, which details his experience promoting his various electoral conspiracy theories. The book, largely compiled of text copied-and-pasted from Byrne's blog, was hastily produced, with the print version including hyperlinks and embedded video not useful in the paper printed format. Frontline broadcast an episode at this time that highlighted Byrne's consistent pushback when questions arose the veracity of his theories, without providing further evidence. At this time, Byrne also urged election-fraud believers to sign up to pay him $5 per month, in credit-card recurring charges, to view his social media posts about what he claimed to be "insider knowledge"; this could bring Byrne up to $1.15 million annually in subscription fees.

During the audit in Maricopa County, Arizona, Byrne funded a documentary film, The Deep Rig, created by director Roger R. Richards, to promote his 2020 election-related falsehoods. Richards was previously known for films promoting fantastical claims, such as the belief that the September 11 attacks were caused by a conspiracy by extraterrestrial aliens. Byrne is the key figure in the film, which features interviews from various other conspiracy theorists. The film, based partially on Byrne's self-published book, has also been promoted by fellow conspiracy theorist Mike Lindell, who teamed up with Byrne in 2021 in order to push their respective election theories in concert. The reported budget for the film was $750,000, and the streaming cost for the film was between $45 and $500 per view, which resulted in Rachel Maddow commenting that Byrne "seems to be making a ton of money on that" as well. The film premiered at the Dream City Church megachurch in Phoenix, Arizona, where Byrne spoke alongside the director and, according to The New Yorker, "a local QAnon conspiracist, BabyQ, who claimed to be receiving messages from his future self." The Washington Post stated that the film encouraged right-wing media outlets and social media accounts to promote election denial on behalf of Trump.

In addition to his interviews and other commentaries pushing his election theories, Byrne also funded a group of investigators to try and prove his theory. On a QAnon-related podcast in late November 2020, Byrne said: "I'm a free agent, and I'm self-funded, and I fund this army of various strange people." He said he envisioned himself as the protagonist leading a team of hackers in a future Hollywood film on his efforts. Byrne promoted his election-related falsehoods on pro-Trump far-right outlets such as One America News Network and Newsmax, which attracted viewers and readers by their willingness to go further than Fox News in promoting Trump's bid to subvert the election result.

Byrne's leadership of the "American Project" reflected his growing influence on the Trumpist right, with the organization playing a major role, in conjunction with other right-wing groups, in promoting election disinformation. Byrne was also briefly the CEO of "Defending the Republic," a fundraising organization founded by Powell that purported to raise funds to fight for "election integrity" but was used instead to Powell's personal legal bills to support her defense against a $1.3 billion defamation suit filed against Powell by Dominion Voting Systems in connection with her promotion of conspiracy theories. In August 2021, Byrne was then added to the defamation lawsuit alongside far-right news outlets OAN and Newsmax filed by Dominion, linking the defamation to Byrne's own pushing of election lies. In the suit, Dominion stated that Byrne had decided that the election "would be stolen" months ahead of the 2020 contest. Byrne and the two news outlets were sued for $1.73 billion each.

In 2022, PBS reported that Byrne had been informed that several of the persons he promoted as stating that Trump was defrauded were lying, but that he chose to promote their words anyways. He also told a reporter from PBS that he "could live with" potentially "destroying the country", referring to the United States. During the 2022 Midterm Elections, Byrne was a major donor to candidates that ran on the premise that the 2020 election was not legitimate. Following the election, he again financed efforts by candidates to overturn their lost election bids, including Kari Lake.

In 2024, Byrne threatened to torture law enforcement involved in his lawsuits with "piano wire and a blowtorch".

=== Anti-vaccination beliefs ===
In the context of his election conspiracy theories, Byrne has also written posts pushing alternative cures to COVID-19 and questioning the role of vaccines on his blog Deep Capture. He has stated that COVID-19 vaccines were either "poisoning Americans" or "putting miniature Covid-19 spike protein factories in our arms to wreak havoc with ovaries and balls". Both claims have been proven false by the medical community. On the same blog, Byrne insisted that the vaccine push has its "origin in political decisions made in Washington, DC," and " little to do with what is best for the health of Americans, and everything to do with political considerations of a regime that came to power in a rigged election." In September 2021, Byrne became a part of a travelling anti-vaccination touring group called the "ReAwaken America" tour that also featured Flynn and Lindell. Byrne travelled with the group to multiple US states with a message that COVID-19 was not a threat and that treatment of it was unhealthy—again something long disproven by actual medical doctors. Admission to their events ran between $250 and US$500 per person. He was one of the largest donors to Robert F. Kennedy Jr.'s campaign for the 2024 Democratic Party presidential nomination.

=== Accusation of defamation against Hunter Biden ===
In November 2023, Hunter Biden filed a defamation lawsuit against Byrne in the State of California, following interview comments and social media posts Byrne made accusing Biden of corruption involving Iran. More than 100,000 individuals reviewed his comments according to the lawsuit. The suit further stated that Byrne had been informed that comments on Biden had been shown to be false, and Byrne refused to retract his comments. In addition to this, Byrne used social media posts to attempt to link his comments to conspiracy theories surrounding the Hunter Biden laptop controversy and attempted to blame him for the 2023 Hamas-led attack on Israel.

In September 2024, Byrne said that he had fled the United States for Dubai and thus would not provide an in person deposition in the US as a part of the suit. Byrne's lawyers said that he had gone to Dubai in response to a perceived threat from the government of Venezuela. In October 2025, a federal judge ordered Byrne in default after he stopped representing himself in the defamation case. As Byrne has no representation in the lawsuit, Biden is on track to obtain a default judgment. In 2026, Byrne claimed that the American kidnapping of Venezuela's president was in part due to his influence.

On July 10, 2026, the United States District Court for the Central District of California granted Hunter Biden default judgement against Byrne, and awarded Biden US$1.7 million in punitive damages, plus $35,000 in monetary sanctions. Judge Steven V. Wilson found Byrne guilty of defamation, and knowingly publishing falsehoods about Biden, finding Byrne's actions to be malicious and reprehensible.

== Education policy ==
Byrne served for ten years as the chairman of the Milton & Rose Friedman Foundation, at the request of Milton Friedman. The non-profit organization was founded by Milton and Rose Friedman and promotes school vouchers and other forms of school choice. After the agreed upon ten years, he changed the name and stepped down.

In 2005, Byrne provided financial backing to the Class Education, whose goal is to change state laws to require schools to spend at least 65 percent of their operating budgets on classroom expenses. Proponents of the standard contend that it would free up money to increase teachers' salaries without requiring tax increases. Critics say that many services deemed "non-classroom" are necessary for education, including librarians, school nurses, guidance counselors, food service workers and school bus drivers to which Byrne responded that funding was being sucked up district, county, state, and federal layers the public did not see.

Byrne and his family contributed most of the funds in support of House Bill 148 in Utah, a bill that would allow the state to provide funding vouchers for students who decide to leave public schools for private schools. In January 2008, it was reported that Byrne and his parents contributed about $4 million to the pro-voucher campaign, or three-quarters of its $5.4 million funding and equal the entire total spent by the opposing side. When that bill was defeated in a statewide referendum (62% opposing vs. 38% favoring), the Salt Lake Tribune reported that Byrne "called the referendum a 'statewide IQ test' that Utahns failed." He said, "They don't care enough about their kids. They care an awful lot about this system, this bureaucracy, but they don't care enough about their kids to think outside the box."

Byrne criticized Utah governor Jon Huntsman for not sufficiently supporting the voucher campaign. Huntsman had before he was elected stated that he was "going to be the voucher governor", and Byrne had donated $75,000 to Huntsman's campaign for governor in 2004. When Huntsman was elected, however, he went missing from the debate, and Byrne told the Associated Press that he would now bankroll anyone who could defeat Huntsman at the polls, "even a communist".

== Personal life ==
Shortly after his graduation from Dartmouth, Byrne suffered from testicular cancer; he recovered, but three bouts of the cancer in his 20s left him hospitalized nearly three years and in convalescence for three more. He has been a life-long practitioner of martial arts, holding a black belt in taekwondo, and remains an avid SCUBA diver, skier, and skydiver. He once owned several homes in Sarasota, Florida, which he purchased through a company called Manatee Investments LLC, but he has since sold them.
