= A-1 Express Delivery Service =

A-1 Express Delivery Service, Inc.
- Company type: Private
- Industry: Transportation and Distribution (business)
- Founded: 1997
- Headquarters: Atlanta, GA, United States
- Key people: Mark McCurry (President); Lon Fancher (COO); Donald Jones (Director of Sales)
- Products: Local and nationwide Distribution (business) and transportation services
- Website: a1express.com

A-1 Express Delivery Service, Inc. is an Atlanta transportation, distribution (business), and courier service company headquartered in Metro Atlanta, United States and incorporated in 1997. And filed bankruptcy on 2/14/2017 According to Hoovers, its top three competitors are Dynamex Inc., Velocity Express, LLC. and BeavEx Incorporated. Its AQuickDelivery's same day courier service for Georgia and Alabama, U.S. was included as #314 on the Inc 500 2002 list.

== History ==
A-1 Express Delivery Service, Inc. began in 1997. It provided same-day courier and distribution services and courier management in the United States. It continued services that supported conducting business online, reward programs, and electronic ordering and monitoring. The company also pairs human value and Internet tools such as with local bike messenger services that use Internet features in an effort to save resources for customers and time during heavy traffic.

In 2005, A-1 Express Delivery Services, Inc. added specialty services such as the Less-Than-Truckload shipping services. Less-Than-Truckload (LTL) is defined as the least expensive method to ship various types of freight long distances. It added Night Medical Prescription Delivery Services and Congressional Line Standing. The latter enables congressional or judicial hearing participants, who do not have time to stand in line until admittance, to have a stand-in from A-1 Express Delivery Service, Inc. who will hold the place in line, hold the final seat, and communicate with the client throughout as is needed. The methods of communication used are Internet and cellular.

In November 2005, couriers of various business sizes were invited to become an affiliate and official A-1 Express service provider in each of their respective markets. Monetary investment by the new affiliates was not required.

In December 2005, A-1 Express Delivery Service, Inc. added an option to meet daily internal and external service needs between offices, such as payroll, deposits, packages, and mail deliveries while keeping cost as lower. The program involves logistical analyses of locations and time perimeters required by the client. This is supported by utilizing route optimization systems to map out delivery efficiencies.

In 2007, Mark McCurry and Lon Fancher (co-founders of A-1 Express Delivery Services, Inc.) acquired the rights to www.1-800courier.com and used that platform to market to national businesses which require a nationwide footprint. A sample of the businesses served include BMW of North America, Morgan Stanley Smith Barney, Coca-Cola and Esurance.

Early in February 2012, A-1 Express Delivery Service, Inc. partnered with Washington Express Visas Services to provide Washington, DC visa and passport courier services. In 2013, the company began Washington, DC visa and passport courier services and medical and specimen delivery services.

== Memberships and awards ==
- Inc 500 2002 List #314 for AQuickDelivery
- A-1 Express Delivery Service, Inc. listed by HighBeam Research as a southern USA courier service company
