= Canyon West Shopping Center =

Master-planned development in Texas, US

Coordinates: 33.54913°N 101.95195°W

Canyon West is a 155-acre (0.63 km^{2}) master-planned development in Lubbock, Texas, currently being developed by Hub West Development LLC, made up of co-developers Hodges Development and De La Vega Development of Dallas. Site preparation began in 2005 and development continues today. The $150 million project will be constructed in three large phases, including: a "power shopping district," a fashion district and an entertainment district.

== Anchors ==
Canyon West has several planned anchors. The Target Corporation opened a Target store in October 2006 at the site. Anchors Burlington Coat Factory (80,000 sq ft.), Main Event Entertainment (65,000 sq ft.) opened in 2007. Sportsman's Warehouse has been announced. DSW Shoes and Ross Dress for Less will be opening in early 2008. Lifeway Christian Store opened in early 2008.

== Other development ==
DSW Shoe Warehouse (15,000 sq ft.), Lifeway Christian Stores (6,000 sq ft.; relocating from 50th Street location), Kirkland's (10,000 sq ft.; relocating from South Plains Mall), Ross Dress for Less (30,000 sq ft.), Ulta Salon & Cosmetics (10,800 sq ft.) and World Market (18,000 sq ft.) have been announced as of February 2007.

Several restaurant and small retail pad sites are included on the site plan. The first of these pads, Cracker Barrel and Starbucks, opened in late 2007.
