= PassportCard =

British travel insurance and International Private Medical Insurance company

- Company type: Private
- Traded as: Subsidiary of White Mountains Insurance Group NYSE: WTM and DavidShield L.I.A (2000) Ltd
- Industry: Insurance
- Founded: 2014; 12 years ago
- Founder: Alon Ketzef
- Headquarters: London, United Kingdom
- Key people: Alon Ketzef, President of PassportCard group
- Products: Cross border health insurance, Travel Insurance, International Medical Insurance; TPA/ASO – Medical Insurance
- Number of employees: 700 (2019)
- Subsidiaries: PassportCard GMBH; PassportCard Australia; PassportCard Israel; PassportCard Swiss
- Website: www.passportcard.com

PassportCard is part of the Davidshield Group, an international travel insurance and private medical insurance focusing on markets in Germany, Australia and Israel.

Customers insured with PassportCard use a prepaid card to pay health service providers, eliminating the need to submit invoices or pay deductibles.

== History ==
PassportCard was founded in 2014 by Alon Ketzef as a subsidiary of DavidShield Life Insurance Agency, established in 2000 by Ketzef and Gad Hitron.

PassportCard Germany was launched in 2020 in Hamburg offering its private medical insurance products which follows its cooperation in Germany with Allianz that started in 2015. PassportCard Australia (TravelCard) was established in 2018 in cooperation with Hollard Group.

In 2015, White Mountains Insurance Group purchased 50% of PassportCard for 21 million dollars in a joint venture with DavidShield.

In 2018, White Mountains bought Hitron's shares at DavidShield for $42 million. White Mountains continues to hold 50% of PassportCard/DavidShield and Alon Ketzef, 50%.

PassportCard is Israel's largest travel insurer. The company has 2.1 million customers in Israel.

In 2018, The Marker reported that PassportCard insurance accounted for 40% of the Israeli travel insurance market.

In January 2020, DavidShield got an insurance license in Israel and established its own insurance company, DavidShield insurance company; previously the group companies were agencies and the insurer was the Phoenix insurance company.

== Technology ==
The system enables payment of medical expenses in real-time, protecting travellers' funds and budgets. When the client needs medical treatment, this card is used to pay for it.

PassportCard uses Real Time Autonomous insurance. Insured members are issued a credit card accepted by most medical facilities around the world. If medical assistance is needed, members call PassportCard customer care and the card is topped-up with the required funds. The client then pays the medical provider using the card. If necessary, the card can be used to withdraw cash from an ATM to pay the medical provider or reimburse the client for specific claims as detailed in the insurance terms and conditions.

== Awards and recognition ==
In 2014, PhocusWright named PassportCard the most innovative emerging company. It also won the General Catalyst Award for Travel Innovation.

In 2014 & 2016 THE APAC EMMA’S Innovation in Global Mobility.

In 2016, PassportCard won the ITIJ Award for Best Specialist Service Provider of the Year.

In 2016, the DavidShield app was named winner of "Most Innovative Use of Technology in Global Mobility."

In 2016 the company was chosen among MEDICI Top 7 InsurTech Startups in the EMEA.

In 2018, the company won the Adif insurance award for the best health insurance technology.

In 2018 the company won the LMI's 5 stars ranking of claims service in Australia.

In 2019, the Travelcard Australia won the Mansfield Award recognizing claims excellence.

In 2019 the company won Australia Choice award for best Travel Insurance plan.

In 2021 the company won the German Innovation Gold award

== See also ==
- Economy of Israel
