= BBBY =

BBBY may refer to:

- Bed Bath & Beyond, the big-box retailer that ceased operations in 2023, which used the stock symbol BBBY.
- Neighborhood Intelligence, the online retailer, formerly known as Bed Bath & Beyond, that owns and uses the Bed Bath & Beyond brand, and uses the stock symbol BBBY.
