= Jonathan E. Johnson =

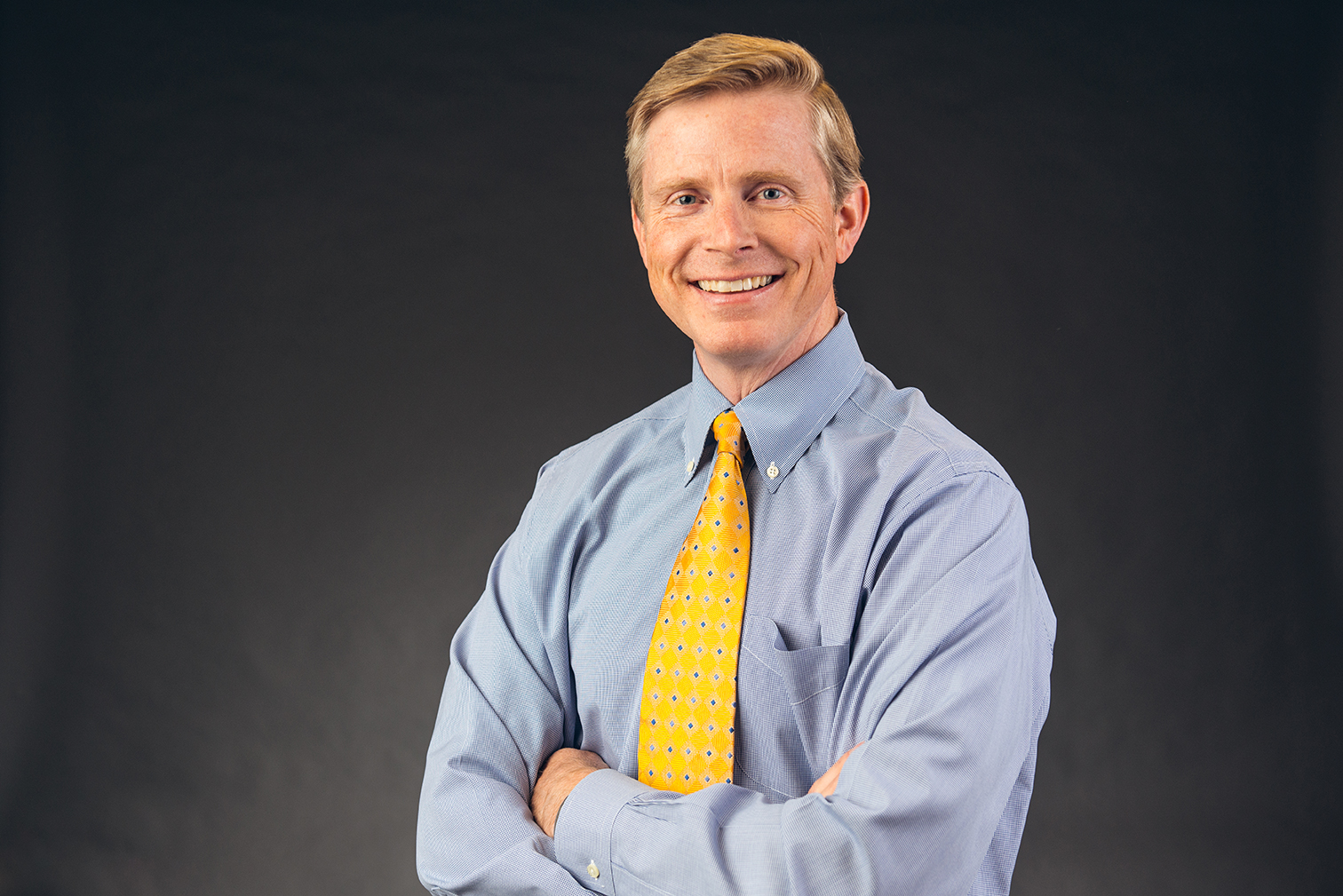
- Johnson in 2015
- Born: 1966 (age 59–60); Los Angeles, California, U.S.
- Education: Brigham Young University, Utah
- Political party: Republican
- Board member of: overstock.com
- Spouse: Courtney Johnson (m. 1988)
- Children: 5

Jonathan Edwin "J.J." Johnson III is an American business executive who was the CEO of Overstock.com from 2019 to 2023. He was a candidate for the Republican nomination in the 2016 Utah gubernatorial election.

== Personal life and education ==
Johnson was born in Los Angeles, California, to Jonathan E. Johnson II and Clare Hardy Johnson, the oldest of their eight sons. He received a bachelor's degree in Japanese from Brigham Young University (BYU) in 1990, followed by a juris doctor degree from BYU's J. Reuben Clark Law School, in 1993.

== Career ==
Following his graduation, Johnson worked as a clerk for Utah Supreme Court Justice Leonard H. Russon.

In 1999, Johnson moved back to Utah to work for the publicly traded software company TenFold Corporation, lasting there until 2002 when he was hired by Overstock.com to be general counsel. He was the chairman of the board at Overstock until 2019. Upon the departure of Patrick Byrne on August 22, 2019, Johnson became the interim CEO of the company. One month later on September 23, 2019, Johnson was appointed permanent CEO. He resigned in November 2023, following accusations of poor performance in a letter from a major shareholder.

== 2016 campaign for governor of Utah ==
Johnson, a Republican, formally announced his candidacy for governor on August 15, 2015 at the state GOP convention Johnson defeated the incumbent governor, Gary Herbert, at the convention, triggering a primary election, which was held June 28, 2016.

On April 18, 2016, Johnson announced his selection of Robyn Bagley as his running mate. Bagley is the founder of a charter school, and was a leader on the losing side in the voucher battle in 2007. Herbert defeated Johnson in the primary, and went on to win reelection in the general election.

=== Education ===
Johnson and Bagley focused on education during their announcement to run together for governor and lieutenant governor, and expressed their intention to put education decisions into the hands of private companies. Both running mates voiced support for vouchers that would allow public funding to go to private schools.
