= Zulily =

American fashion company

- Company type: Brand
- Industry: Internet, online retailing
- Founded: December 10, 2009; 16 years ago
- Founders: Darrell Cavens; Mark Vadon
- Fate: General assignment
- Headquarters: Seattle, Washington, U.S.
- Area served: United States; Canada; United Kingdom; Ireland; Australia
- Key people: David Nielsen (CEO); Marcus Lemonis (chairman)
- Products: Children's and women's apparel, toys, infant gear and home decor
- Services: Flash sale notifications
- Revenue: $366 million (2016)
- Net income: −$10.33 million (2012)
- Parent: Liberty Interactive (2015-23); Regent, L.P. (2023); Beyond, Inc. (2024–present)
- Website: zulily.com

Zulily is an American e-commerce website with operations headquartered in Midvale, Utah. Its target audience are young mothers interested in brand-name goods for their children.

== Overview ==
In its original incarnation from 2009 to 2023, the company held no inventory. Instead, it operated by shipping vendor-owned merchandise at its fulfillment centers, or drop shipping directly to customers.

With sales that generally lasted 72 hours, the store offered discounts every day. In 2014, half of Zulily's orders came from mobile devices. After a succession of ownership changes, the company abruptly suspended operations near the end of 2023.

On March 7, 2024, Beyond Inc. announced that it had purchased its intellectual property. After relaunching the Zulily website in September 2024, Beyond sold the majority of its stake in the brand to the operator of Proozy.com.

== History ==
Zulily was founded in 2009 by former Blue Nile executives Mark Vadon and Darrell Cavens after Vadon's wife had become pregnant, and he was overwhelmed by the process of acquiring the supplies they had not been aware of needing. Zulily went live on January 27, 2010, with an initial focus on children's apparel. By the fourth quarter of 2010, Zulily was a cash-flow–positive business. The company's early strategies included the use of flash sales announced via early-morning emails; by 2012, it had over 10 million members.

When Zulily went public in November 2013, the company had 2.6 million active customers and $331 million in revenue. Its initial public offering valued the company at $2.6 billion. Rather than using a large network of warehouses to quickly ship stored products, Zulily did not purchase the bulk of its product from suppliers until after they were ordered by customers.

In August 2015, Zulily was purchased by Liberty Interactive's QVC division for $2.4 billion. In September 2017, Zulily launched a private label credit card. The company announced a sponsorship of local soccer teams Seattle Sounders FC and Reign FC in January 2019 that included the use of their logo on jerseys.

In May 2023, Qurate Retail announced the sale of Zulily to Regent, L.P. The company's revenue had dropped significantly in 2022 and 2023, which was followed by three rounds of layoffs in the Seattle area. Zulily listed its Belltown headquarters for sale and moved into a smaller space in Seattle's Pioneer Square in October 2023.

=== Wind down ===
In early December, Zulily filed a notice of its intent to lay off 292 employees in Seattle following several lawsuits filed against the company and the departure of CEO Terry Boyle. Zulily laid off another 547 employees at warehouses in Nevada and Ohio. On December 9, the company announced a "going-out-of-business sale", which reporters interpreted as a sign that the company was preparing to close down entirely.

By December 18, 2023, customers reported that Zulily's website, app, and customer service phone line were inoperable. The company laid off additional employees on December 20.

On December 22, 2023, Douglas Wilson Companies announced that it was the assignee of Zulily's assignment for the benefit of creditors (ABC). A special purpose entity, Zulily ABC, LLC, managed the wind down of Zulily's business and liquidated its assets for the benefit of its creditors. The ABC arrangement was an alternative to bankruptcy.

Zulily's intellectual property was acquired by competitor Beyond, Inc. in March 2024, in a deal valued at $4.5 million in cash.

=== New ownership and revival ===
In March 2025, Beyond, Inc. announced it would sell a 75% stake in the Zulily brand to Lyons Trading Company, the operator of Proozy.com, valuing the brand at approximately $6.7 million; Beyond retained a 25 percent interest.

== Business model ==
In 2015, it decreased the number of flash sales, in response to some customers who were overwhelmed by the amount of merchandise from which to select. Retaining customers was a challenge for it: "the flash-sale website is straining to hold on to customers and realizing it may have inundated shoppers with too many deals". Although revenue was up 29% in the first quarter of 2015 compared to the prior year, that was less of a huge increase than the 52% shown for the last quarter of 2014 compared to one year earlier, leading the company to lower its estimate of anticipated revenues in 2015.

Although the website for the company said they held no inventory, in 2015 they began to hold some merchandise in warehouses to shorten the time for delivery. The lack of inventory caused quality control issues including defective merchandise, damaged merchandise, incorrect or incomplete products being sent to customers. The company issued refunds for shipping paid on the damaged, defective or incorrect merchandise if it was the only item bought, or it replaced the item for free. The company included some established brands in addition to the emerging brands on which it had completely relied.
