= John J. Byrne =

American businessman

John Byrne
- Born: July 11, 1932; Paterson, New Jersey, U.S.
- Died: March 7, 2013 (aged 80); Etna, New Hampshire, U.S.
- Education: Rutgers University, New Brunswick (BA); University of Michigan, Ann Arbor (MA)

John J. Byrne (July 11, 1932 – March 7, 2013) was an American longtime insurance industry executive who was CEO of GEICO, White Mountains Insurance Group and Fireman's Fund. He also served as chairman of Overstock.com.

== Early background ==
As a young man, Byrne worked for his father, who owned a small insurance agency in Wildwood, New Jersey. He attended Rutgers University, where he graduated with a mathematics degree, and then worked as an actuarial assistant for Travelers Insurance Company. He then earned a master's degree in mathematics.

After serving in the U.S. Air Force, Byrne worked as a reinsurance salesman for Lincoln National Life Insurance. He then moved to Travelers and was eventually promoted to executive vice president in charge of life insurance operations.

== Insurance industry magnate ==
After being passed over for president at Travelers in 1975, Byrne quit to become chief executive of GEICO, then a troubled Washington, D.C., auto insurer. GEICO sold insurance directly to low-risk drivers, but had begun to lose money after underwriting riskier drivers. The company's shares had declined and regulators wanted to shut it down.

Supported by Warren Buffett (who was a close watcher of GEICO and had named the company "The Security I Like Best" in 1951), led a turnaround of GEICO; Byrne accomplished this by firing more than 1,500 employees, reducing the staff to fewer than 6,400, and closing 23 sales offices. GEICO also stopped writing policies in several states. Buffett's Berkshire Hathaway eventually acquired the company, and Buffett has called Byrne the "Babe Ruth of insurance."

In 1985, Byrne was invited to run the troubled Fireman's Fund, then a subsidiary of American Express. Fireman's had incurred $356 million in pretax losses in 1983 and 1984. Byrne vastly improved Fireman's financial performance and initiated a public offering of some of Fireman's shares in 1985. The company was sold to Allianz AG in 1991. Byrne retained the Fireman's holding company, which he later renamed as White Mountains Insurance Group.

== Role at Overstock.com ==
Byrne's son Patrick M. Byrne bought a 60% interest in the Internet retailer D2: Discounts Direct, changing its name to Overstock.com. The elder Byrne served as an Overstock.com director from October 1999 until October 2002, and then rejoined the board in June 2004. He was elected chairman in October 2005.

In March 2006, the elder Byrne said that he was thinking of stepping down in disagreement over his son's campaign against naked short selling, which he said was distracting his son from leading the company. In April 2006, John Byrne stepped down to become vice-chairman, and was replaced by Patrick Byrne. In July 2006, John Byrne resigned from Overstock's board of directors. In August 2008, Jack Byrne said that after "much initial skepticism" he believed his son was "right all along" about the battle and lawsuits with short-sellers and analysts. He was reelected to the board on May 12, 2010.

Byrne died at his home in Etna, New Hampshire on March 7, 2013, after a long struggle against cancer.
