= CHG Healthcare Services =

American healthcare services company

CHG Healthcare
- Type: Privately held company
- Industry: Healthcare
- Founded: Salt Lake City, Utah, U.S. (1979)
- Founder: Therus C. Kolff
- Headquarters: Midvale, Utah, U.S.
- Area served: Intermountain West, U.S.
- Key people: Therus C. Kolff, MD; Leslie Snavely (CEO)
- Number of employees: 3,164
- Website: www.chghealthcare.com

CHG Healthcare is an American healthcare services company that was founded in 1979 to deliver medical care to rural areas of the western United States. The company is based in Midvale, Utah. The company consists of a collection of healthcare-related companies such as LocumsMart, CompHealth, Weatherby Healthcare, RNnetwork, Foundation Medical Staffing, Global Medical Staffing (purchased in 2016), and Modio Health (purchased in 2019).

The CHG family of companies is one of the largest providers of healthcare staffing in the United States, with a 31% market share in locum tenens revenue. Their services also include both temporary and permanent placement of physicians, nurses, and allied health professionals.

== History ==
CHG Healthcare was founded as CompHealth Inc. in 1979 by Therus C. Kolff as temporary physician staffing firm. The company initially provided staffing for short periods, usually two weeks, but began providing longer-term contract staffing assignments by the mid 1980's. Kolff sold the company to Continental Medical Systems in 1991 but remained as CEO. Continental expanded CompHealth by purchasing Kron Medical Corporation in 1993, pushing annual revenue to $100 million in 1994.

Horizon Healthcare Corporation acquired Continental Medical Systems for $502 million in 1995 with the combined company becoming known as Horizon/CMS. HealthSouth purchased Horizon/CMS in 1997 for $1.8 billion. HealthSouth sold a majority of its stake in CompHealth to venture capital firms New Enterprise Associates and Acacia Venture Partners at the end of 1998 and its remaining stake in the company in 2003. By 1999 CompHealth was the largest provider of temporary physician staffing services in the country.

CompHealth acquired Foundation Medical Staffing in September 2005. The acquisition added 1,000 employees and allowed Foundation Medical to operate independently of CompHealth. CompHealth changed its name later that year in December to CHG Healthcare Services to eliminate confusion between CompHealth and Foundation Medical.

In October 2012, the company was acquired by private equity firms Leonard Green & Partners and Ares Management.

In January 2015, Scott Beck was named CEO. He replaced Michael Weinholtz, who had served as CEO since 1998. Beck retired in 2024 and was replaced by Leslie Snavely.

In August 2024, Leslie Snavely was named CEO.

== Acquisitions ==
The company acquired Global Medical Staffing in August 2016 and remained a stand-alone brand.

In 2019, Modio Health, a cloud-based career management and credentialing company.

CHG Healthcare acquired Locumsmart, a locum tenes vendor management system, in February 2020.

== Recognition ==
In 2018, the company was listed at #2 on the Salt Lake Tribune's "Top Work Places" for large businesses. Up until 2022, the company was consistently named as one of Fortune's "100 Best Companies to Work For".
