= Bed Bath & Beyond (2023–present) =

American online retailer

- Formerly: Overstock.com, Inc. (1999–2023); Beyond, Inc. (2023–2025); Bed Bath & Beyond, Inc. (2025–2026)
- Type: Public
- Traded as: Nasdaq: NXH; NYSE: BBBY
- Industry: Retail
- Predecessors: Bed Bath & Beyond (original company); The Container Store; D2: Discount Direct
- Founded: 1999; 27 years ago
- Founder: Patrick M. Byrne
- Headquarters: Nashville, Tennessee, United States
- Key people: Marcus Lemonis, CEO
- Brands: Bed Bath & Beyond; Buy Buy Baby; Overstock.com; Zulily
- Revenue: ▼US$1.93 billion (2022)
- Operating income: ▼US$27 million (2022)
- Net income: ▼ −US$35 million (2022)
- Total assets: ▼US$879 million (2022)
- Total equity: ▼US$646 million (2022)
- Number of employees: 1,050 (2022)
- Website: bedbathandbeyond.com; beyond.com

Neighborhood Intelligence, Inc., d/b/a Bed Bath & Beyond (previously named Overstock.com, Inc. and Beyond, Inc.) is an American online retailer, founded in 1999 by Patrick M. Byrne and Jason Lindsey. It used the Overstock.com brand for over 20 years, and was known for selling closeout merchandise including home decor, furniture, and bedding.

Overstock.com acquired the intellectual property of the bankrupt big-box store chain Bed Bath & Beyond in 2023. The company went through several name changes until late 2025, when they formally adopted the legal name and ticker symbol of Bed Bath & Beyond.

== History ==
=== As Overstock.com ===
The company was founded as D2:Discounts Direct on May 5, 1997, by Robert Brazell. The company went bankrupt in 1999. Patrick M. Byrne and Jason Lindsey acquired the company and renamed it as Overstock.com. The company initially sold exclusively surplus and returned merchandise on an online e-commerce marketplace, liquidating the inventories of at least 18 failed dot-com companies at below-wholesale prices.

In 2001, Overstock set up the Worldstock division to showcase the work of artisans from around the world. By 2006 there were approximately 6,000 producers contributing.

In May 2002, Overstock held an IPO at a per-share price of $13. Amazon was one of the investors in Overstock.com that exited at the time of IPO.

In addition to its direct retail sales, Overstock.com began offering online auctions on its website in 2004, known as Overstock.com Marketplace and later O.co Marketplace. This service was retired in July 2011.

After initially relying solely on word-of-mouth marketing from customers, the company turned to distinctive television advertisements starring German actress Sabine Ehrenfeld. Later, they would employ other advertising spokespersons.

In July 2006, John J. Byrne, the father of Overstock's chief executive, resigned from the board of directors after a public airing of the elder Byrne's unhappiness with his son's actions against naked short-selling. In August 2008, Jack Byrne said that after "much initial skepticism" he believed his son was "right all along" about the battle and lawsuits with short-sellers and analysts. In 2010 the elder Byrne returned to the Overstock.com board of directors.

In early 2007, John A. Fisher and Ray Groves resigned from the Overstock board of directors over disagreement with the company's prime broker suit.

On January 2, 2008, Overstock announced that cofounder Jason Lindsey had resigned as president, COO, and as a director of Overstock effective from December 31, 2007. Byrne said Lindsey had "played a decisive role getting [Overstock] back on track" after "I screwed it up a couple years ago". Overstock stock dropped to a four-year low following the announcement, which an analyst for investment bank Broadpoint Capital described as a "key loss".

After achieving significant growth and profits in some early quarters, the company achieved a profit of $7.7 million in 2009 and reported its first billion-dollar year in 2010.

The Overstock logo used from 2017 to 2023, and reintroduced in 2025.

In 2011, revenues dropped 5 percent over a two-month penalty period imposed by Google. According to the Associated Press, Overstock set up fake websites linking back to its site. Overstock said it was penalized in part for a practice of encouraging college and university websites to post links to Overstock pages so that students and faculty could receive discounts. As a result of the Google penalty, search results for certain products dropped in Google rankings.

The business started rebranding in early 2011, as "O.co," to simplify and unify its international operations but interrupted this effort a few months later, citing consumer confusion over the new name, which utilized a Colombian country domain.

During the same year, Overstock.com acquired naming rights to the former Oakland–Alameda County Coliseum, renaming it Overstock.com Coliseum. The Coliseum was later rebranded O.co Coliseum, in keeping with Overstock's then-rebranding as O.co (in April 2016, the name O.co Coliseum was dropped in favor of Oakland-Alameda Coliseum).

In 2013, Overstock began promoting increased immigration. Overstock president Jonathan Johnson told the Los Angeles Times that his firm had struggled to hire enough computer programmers and software developers to expand the business. "We pay more, and they are still hard to fill", he said. "We need to be more free in letting people in. That helps us solve our border problem. No one goes through the window of a house if they can ring the doorbell and come in the front door."

In 2014, Overstock began developing software that would allow it to distribute corporate stock online instead of using traditional methods like the New York Stock Exchange or NASDAQ.

Byrne took an indefinite leave of absence in April 2016, because of hepatitis C complications. The general counsel, Mitch Edwards, was named acting CEO. In July 2016, Byrne returned as CEO.

On August 22, 2019, CEO Patrick Byrne resigned his CEO and board seat at Overstock via a 1,600 word email. In the email he admitted to a romantic affair with Maria Butina, an unregistered foreign agent of Russia, but Byrne did not provide additional information on how this prompted his resignation. Shortly thereafter, Jonathan E. Johnson became CEO.

The company announced a digital dividend with a record date of September 23, 2019. For each 10 shares of traditional stock held, an investor would be entitled to 1 share of Digital Voting Series A-1 Preferred Stock. Initially the digital shares would only be tradable on the PRO Securities alternative trading system, which licensed its technology from tZero, an Overstock subsidiary focused on blockchain technology.

=== As Bed Bath & Beyond ===
Beyond, Inc. logo, used from 2023 until 2025

In June 2023, the company won a $21.5 million bid for Bed Bath & Beyond's intellectual property assets. On June 29, it was announced that Overstock.com would be rebranding as Bed Bath & Beyond; the name was changed on August 1, two days after the original Bed Bath & Beyond closed its last stores.

Overstock logo used in 2024.

On October 24, 2023, it was announced that the company would rebrand as Beyond, Inc. effective November 6, 2023. The same day, the company switched its stock listing to the New York Stock Exchange under its new name, and Johnson resigned as CEO, replaced by Dave Nielsen in an interim capacity.

On March 28, 2024, Beyond relaunched the Overstock.com brand name, intending to place the brand in a higher market segment from Bed Bath & Beyond by targeting larger purchases and higher-income consumers. Beyond had also planned to relaunch the Zulily brand in Q2 2024 however this did not come to pass.

In October 2024, Beyond announced a $40 million investment in The Container Store, along with a new line of Bed, Bath & Beyond-branded household goods to be sold at its brick-and-mortar locations. However, on November 20th, Beyond announced that they had concerns that The Container Store would be able to reach terms with its lenders that would satisfy the financing agreements for the investment. Beyond gave The Container Store a deadline of January 31, 2025 to obtain acceptable financing.

In 2025, Beyond purchased Kirkland's for $10 million and announced its conversion to Bed Bath and Beyond Home stores. Its first store opened in Nashville, Tennessee in August. More stores opened throughout the rest of 2025 and as of the end of 2025, there are now 5 stores under the Bed Bath and Beyond name. The plan is to open as many as 300 stores over the next few years. In April 2026, the company announced that it would acquire The Container Store for $150 million and announced that it would return to physical retail stores in the United States, opening three new stores in Massachusetts. Ninety-eight Container Store locations would be rebranded under the name "The Container Store - Bed Bath & Beyond", with the merger expected to close on or after July 1, 2026. This includes opening locations in the state of California where the company's CEO initially said they would not return with brick-and-mortar stores.

In 2026, the company changed its corporate name to Neighborhood Intelligence, and moved its headquarters to Nashville.

== Brands ==
Under the umbrella organization of Bed Bath & Beyond, Inc., the company's brands are:

- The Container Store - retail chain, rebranded as The Container Store / Bed Bath & Beyond as of July 2026
- Kirkland's – retail chain that sells home decor, furniture, textiles, accessories and gifts
- Buy Buy Baby – big-box retail chain selling clothing, strollers, and other items for use with infants and young children
- Overstock.com
- Zulily – e-commerce website (25% stake)

== Business model and management ==
Part of Overstock.com's merchandise is purchased by or manufactured specifically for the company. Among their products are handmade goods produced for Overstock by workers in developing nations. The company also manages the inventory supply for other retailers.

=== Bitcoin ===
On January 9, 2014, Overstock.com became the first major retailer to start accepting bitcoin as payments for its goods. In the first 22 hours, they received over 800 orders worth US$126,000 in bitcoin. This represents a 4.33% increase in sales from their normal income of $3 million per day.

As of March 13, 2014, Overstock bitcoin income had shrunk to under 1% of their normal daily cash intake.

In a community interview with social media site Reddit on May 3, 2014, in response to a question to the Overstock CEO Patrick Byrne about the percentage of revenue and transactions paid for in bitcoin, Byrne responded that the percentage was "Tiny. <.1%". In mid-2014, Overstock.com announced that bitcoin sales were averaging $300,000 per month and that the company expected bitcoin sales to add 4 cents to the company's 2014 earnings per share.

Despite having made at least $175 million in bitcoin or other blockchain investments, as of September 2019, the firm had never recorded any profits from those investments.

=== Naked short selling controversy ===
The company has received attention stemming from CEO Patrick Byrne's battle against alleged naked short selling of his company's shares. Beginning in 2005, Byrne has contended that a number of companies, including Overstock.com, have been the targets of this practice, which involves selling a stock short but without the usual step of initially borrowing or locating the shares. Byrne alleges that the practice circumvents safeguards of conventional shorting, and has been used in large schemes devised to profit from driving down the prices of companies' shares, in many cases leading to these companies' failure. With Overstock, Byrne contends that the company's longstanding appearance on the Regulation SHO Threshold Security list, an SEC-mandated list showing companies with a high number of "fails to deliver", along with high trading volumes that sometimes surpass total quantity of the company's stock, establish that it has been targeted by this practice. Byrne's campaign has been controversial, including criticism in the financial press that Byrne is seeking to divert attention from Overstock's share price declines and failure to turn a profit. New York Times columnist Joseph Nocera has said in 2006 that, "Except for a few fellow-traveling Web sites, where Mr. Byrne is viewed as a heroic figure, most people who understand the issue or have looked into it think it's pretty bogus." Others have suggested that the problem is real, but that the SEC acts to prevent it and that it does not happen on any scale such as Byrne suggests. SEC Chairman Christopher Cox called abusive naked short selling "a fraud that the commission is bound to prevent and to punish."

Overstock filed a lawsuit against the hedge fund Rocker Partners in 2005 for libel, unfair business practices and tortious interference, saying it colluded with a research firm, Gradient Analytics, in short-selling the company while paying Gradient Analytics to publish negative reports about Overstock.com and supplying pre-publication copies to Rocker. Naked short-selling was not alleged in that suit. In a conference call with analysts in August 2005, a day after the suit was filed, Byrne said that "there's been a plan since we were in our teens to destroy our stock, drive it down to $6–10 ... and even a plan for how the company would then get whacked up." He said that the conspirators were part of a "Miscreants Ball", headed by a "Sith Lord", who he refused to identify but said "he's one of the master criminals from the 1980s." Byrne said the conspiracy included hedge funds, journalists, investigators, trial lawyers, the SEC, and Eliot Spitzer." Gradient Analytics countersued, alleging Byrne waged a smear campaign.

Rocker Partners, renamed Copper River Management, filed a counterclaim against Overstock in November 2007, alleging overstatement of profits, false projections, and misrepresentations about the company's ventures. Copper River also alleges that Byrne tried to silence critics by suing them. A portion of this suit was settled out of court on October 13, 2008 when Overstock.com and Gradient dropped the claims against each other after Gradient retracted allegations that Overstock's reporting methods did not comply with rules established by the FASB, stated they believed Overstock.com complied with GAAP standards, and that three directors were independent according to NASD standards, and apologized. Byrne has said the apology and settlement "represents a great step forward in our case", while Copper River's attorney stated that "If somehow this improved Overstock's case, then Gradient would admit to doing something wrong and they haven't", and that he expected the settlement to help Copper River's case.

On December 8, 2009, it was announced that Copper River had reached an out of court settlement with Overstock. As part of the agreement, Copper River, which closed in December 2008, agreed to pay Overstock $5 million. In a letter to his shareholders, Patrick Byrne said, "The good guys won". Copper River said in a statement that it continued to deny Overstock's allegations. Copper River managing general partner Marc Cohodes said "Although settlement deprives us of the ability to disprove Overstock's case and prosecute our counterclaims, we decided that the litigation costs did not justify passing up a practical way to end four-and-half years of meritless litigation by Overstock."

In February 2007, Overstock.com launched a $3.5 billion lawsuit against Morgan Stanley, Goldman Sachs and other large Wall Street firms, alleging a "massive illegal stock market manipulation scheme" involving naked short selling. Among its allegations, Overstock stated that since at least January 2005, naked short selling has accounted for large portions of Overstock stock, in some cases exceeding the 23.4 million total shares outstanding. The lawsuit alleged that this had created "immense downward pressure" on share prices over time. Kerry Fields, associate professor of law and business ethics at the University of Southern California, said, "Byrne may be able to help set new law if he handles this right." Fields said, Byrne's "best approach now is probably to persuade the SEC, which continues to wander around the issue, or the government to serve subpoenas and let them decide whether or not his company was wronged." John Coffee, director of the Center on Corporate Governance at Columbia University Law School, described it as overly ambitious and "extremely unpromising." Two members of the Overstock.com board of directors, John Fisher and Ray Groves, resigned in disagreement over the lawsuit.

In December 2010, all but two of the prime broker defendants settled out of court with Overstock for $4.4 million. That same month, the company filed a motion seeking to amend its lawsuit against the remaining defendants—Goldman Sachs and Merrill Lynch—to include claims of RICO violations. The enhanced claims were based on evidence gained through discovery in the case.

The RICO claim was dismissed at trial, and this was affirmed on appeal. The claim against Goldman was dismissed but Goldman subsequently settled a refiled suit. Merrill finally settled for $20 million in 2016.

== See also ==
- E-commerce
- Online auction
