= Esurance =

American auto insurance provider

Esurance Insurance Services, Inc.
- Company type: Subsidiary
- Industry: Insurance
- Founded: 1999; 27 years ago
- Headquarters: San Francisco, California, United States
- Key people: Jonathan Adkisson (president)
- Products: Insurance
- Revenue: US$2.1 Billion (2019)
- Parent: Folksamerica Holding Co. (2000–2011); Allstate (2011–present)
- Website: esurance.com

Esurance Insurance Services, Inc. is an American insurance company. It sells auto, home, motorcycle, and renters insurance direct to consumers online and by phone. Founded in 1999, the company was acquired by Allstate in 2011.

== History ==
Esurance was founded in 1999 by Jean-Bernard Duler, Jeffrey L. Goodman, Huyen Bui, David Griffin, and Charles Wallace, and became one of the first insurance companies to sell policies directly to consumers over the internet, instead of using in-person meetings or phone calls. In 2000, Esurance was acquired by Folksamerica Holding Company, a subsidiary of White Mountains Insurance Group. Esurance, which is based out of San Francisco, had by that time expanded to offering policies in 24 states, but had also just laid off staff and was actively soliciting a purchaser.

In 2004, Esurance began to offer multi-car discount packages to same-sex couples, by offering multi-car discounts to any group of people that lived together. The company claims to be one of the first insurers to have offered such packages to same-sex couples.

In May 2011, Allstate announced that it was purchasing Esurance and rate-comparison site Answer Financial for approximately $1 billion. At the time, Esurance was selling policies in 30 states and was in the midst of a five-year growth period that saw them double the number of policies in force. Allstate, for its part, was losing policy holders to the three major online policy retailers: Esurance, Progressive, and GEICO. Allstate's acquisition of Esurance was completed in October of that year. The combined company became the sixth-largest provider of auto insurance policies. In September 2012, White Mountains filed a lawsuit against Allstate alleging that Allstate failed to meet a deadline to produce a financial audit that was part of the sale, and that Allstate deducted $5.2 million in legal expenses from the value of the sale that they were not allowed to deduct by the terms of the agreement.

In December 2019, Allstate announced that it would phase out Esurance in 2020 in order to streamline business operations.

In April 2020, Allstate announced that a 15% refund will be forwarded to auto insurance clients of Esurance due to the COVID-19 pandemic.

== Marketing campaigns ==
Esurance's first television advertising campaign was launched five years after the company went live. The campaign was aimed at the 18 to 24-year-old male demographic, and had a budget of $60,000, a tiny fraction of the over $1 billion spent on advertisements within the insurance industry. The commercials featured an animated character named Erin Esurance, a pink-haired spy inspired by Sydney Bristow from the television show Alias. The character and campaign were initially well received, leading to over 30 separate advertisements featuring Erin, and a dramatic increase in brand awareness. However, by 2009 industry polling on corporate mascots found Erin had become unpopular with viewers; 30% of viewers found the character annoying – double the industry average – and was below industry average in sincerity and believability. Polling found Erin was less popular than even Microsoft's notorious character Clippy. Additionally, a large number of pornographic images featuring Erin were created, and in some cases sold, by fans of the character. The illustrations became so prevalent that when the character was searched for by name without mature content filters enabled, the vast majority of results were pornographic. The combination of decreasing popularity and the pornographic images led to the character being retired by 2010.

After the mascot Erin was discontinued in 2010, Esurance launched a new advertising campaign designed by the firm Duncan/Channon. By this point, the company had an advertising budget of $100 million. Set in a fictionalized version of the Esurance office, but featuring actual Esurance employees (although Erin Esurance makes a background appearance) the commercials emphasized both the company's high tech platform and the personal touches offered by speaking to employees. The campaign was a deliberate break from focusing the advertisements on the 18–24 male demographic.

The new campaign was short lived; in December 2011, Esurance announced another new advertising campaign. It emphasized efficiency and positioned the company as "Insurance for the Modern World"; the target demographic was families and professionals in the 25–49 age group. John Krasinski narrated the commercials, which were developed by ad agency Leo Burnett Worldwide.

Esurance also markets itself heavily through sports teams and sporting events, where it casts itself as being more environmentally friendly than competitors. The company has sponsored a number of sporting events and teams, including the US Open tennis tournament, the Golden State Warriors, and the San Francisco Giants.

In February 2015, Esurance released their Super Bowl XLIX commercial, featuring Bryan Cranston parodying his Walter White character from Breaking Bad. In April 2015, Esurance and Major League Baseball announced a new multi-year sponsorship in which Esurance will be the exclusive auto insurance partner for Major League Baseball.

Esurance introduced a new ad campaign featuring Dennis Quaid (in his first-ever appearance in a commercial, and the company's first use of a real-life spokesman) as a tongue-in-cheek "highly likeable" spokesperson in August 2018. The company introduced a new slogan, "surprisingly painless", as part of the rebrand.
