= Kirkland's =

American home decor retail chain

Kirkland's, Inc.

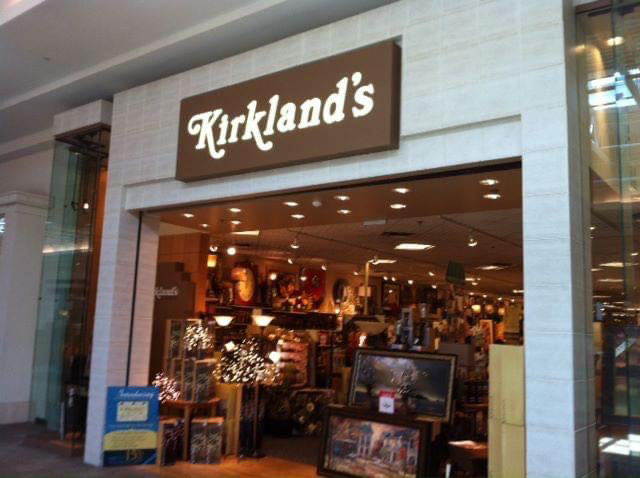
- A Kirkland's store in Southern Park Mall Boardman, Ohio
- Trade name: Kirkland's Home
- Type: Public
- Traded as: Nasdaq: KIRK; S&P 600 Component
- Industry: Retail
- Founded: 1966; 60 years ago, in Jackson, Tennessee, U.S.
- Founders: Carl Kirkland; Robert Kirkland
- Headquarters: Brentwood, Tennessee, U.S.
- Number of locations: 314 (2025)
- Key people: Amy Sullivan (CEO)
- Revenue: ▲US$ 468.7 million (FY2023)
- Operating income: ▼US[$ 24.4] million (FY2023)
- Net income: ▼US$ (8.4) million (FY2023)
- Total assets: ▲US$ 250.6 million (FY2023)
- Total equity: ▲US$ 140.76 million (FY2018)
- Owner: Bed Bath & Beyond
- Number of employees: 6,000 (2023)
- Website: www.kirklands.com

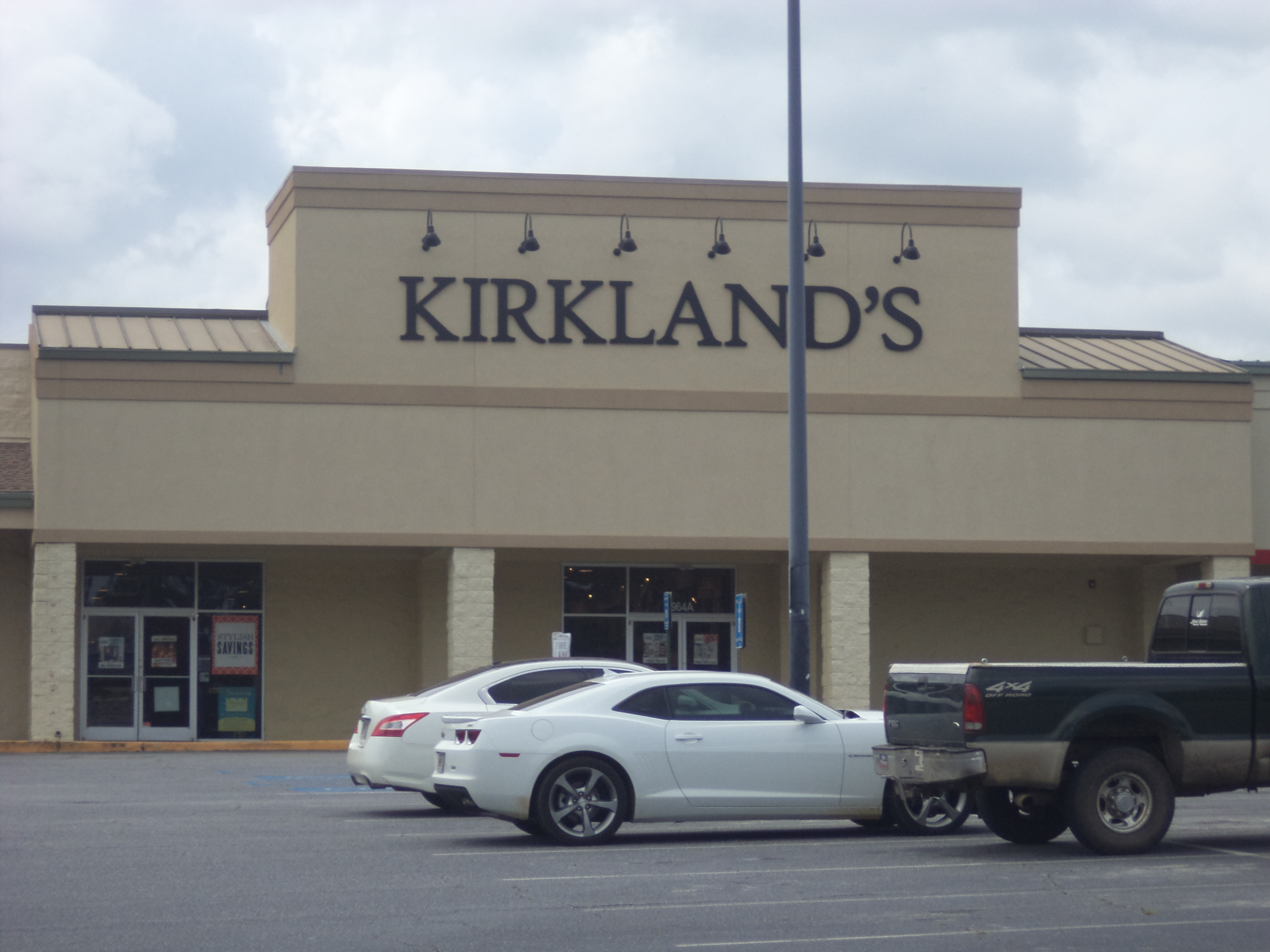
Kirkland's store in Valdosta, Georgia

Kirkland's, Inc. is an American retail chain that sells home decor, furniture, textiles, accessories and gifts. It operates 317 stores in 35 states as well as an e-commerce enabled website. It is based in Brentwood, Tennessee.

== History ==
Kirkland's was founded by Carl Kirkland and Robert Kirkland in 1966 in Jackson, Tennessee, when they began selling home accessories at low prices. Robert was also the main funder for nationally acclaimed museum and fun park, Discovery Park of America, located in Union City, Tennessee.

In October 2023, CreditRiskMonitor reported that the firm was nearing a potential Chapter 11 bankruptcy filing. In February of the following year, Kirkland's announced that Steve Woodward would be replaced by Amy Sullivan as CEO.

On June 26, 2024, at the annual meeting of its shareholders, two long-time members of Kirkland's Board of Directors, R. Wilson Orr, III and Steven J. Collins, resigned after failing to receive majority support from voting shareholders. After Amy Sullivan was elected and Ann Joyce re-elected and appointed as its new Chairman, the Board of Directors voted to reduce its membership from eight to six.

In 2025, the company announced its intention to change its corporate name to The Brand House Collective, including the ticket symbol, pending approval at the shareholders' meeting in July.

On September 15, 2025, Bed Bath & Beyond, Inc. announced that it had acquired the Kirkland's Home brand, as well as certain related assets, for $10 million.

On March 17, 2026 a majority of The Brand House Collective's shareholders approved the company's merger into Bed Bath & Beyond. The merger finalized on April 2, 2026.

== Philanthropy ==
Each year, the firm hosts events and special promotions in benefit of Camp Charley, a camp for critically ill children in Scottsville, Kentucky. Its past philanthropic projects also include participation in ABC's Extreme Makeover: Home Edition and the American Cancer Society Relay for Life, as well as promotion of a holiday-themed music CD in benefit of Habitat for Humanity.

== Restatement ==
On March 17, 2005, the company said quarterly profit fell, and it would restate prior period financial statements to reflect corrections to its lease-related accounting.
