= David Rocker =

American businessman

David A. Rocker (born 1943) founded the hedge fund Rocker Partners, LP.

Rocker holds a magna cum laude bachelor's degree from Harvard College and a Master of Business Administration from Harvard Business School. Rocker and his wife, Marian, reside in Florida and New Jersey. They have two sons.

== Early life and career ==
Rocker's grandparents were Austrian and Russian immigrants. His father was an accountant in West Orange, NJ, where Rocker was raised and married his high school sweetheart, Marian. After graduating from Harvard College, Rocker served for two years as an officer in the US Navy. He returned to Harvard Business School for his MBA.

In 1969, Rocker joined Mitchell Hutchins, where he was a research analyst and investment banker. In 1972, he hired on at Steinhardt, Fine, Berkowitz & Co., a pioneering hedge fund, and was a general partner there from 1973 to 1981.

Rocker joined Century Capital, a registered investment adviser, as a partner in 1981. While there, he was a portfolio manager for institutional clients.

After Century Capital was acquired in 1985, he formed Rocker Partners with $25 million. Originally based in New York City, the firm expanded over the years adding offices in Larkspur, California and Millburn New Jersey. The firm also managed Compass Holdings and Helmsman Holdings in the BVI which pursued similar strategies for foreign clients.

Rocker Partners became incorporated as Copper River Management, LLC. Rocker's former co-manager at the firm, Marc Cohodes, fully assumed managerial duties after Rocker's retirement in early 2007.

Rocker is a strong believer in the value of short selling both as an investment strategy on its own but also, more importantly, to provide investors with alternative points of view in an industry famous for its overtly bullish bias. Rocker was known to openly share his views on the market itself as well as on individual stocks. In 2003, he testified on the industry before the House Subcommittee on capital markets. He also wrote numerous articles for Barrons and other publications and was a frequent guest on CNBC.

== Philanthropy and personal life ==
In retirement Rocker and his wife are involved in numerous charities, with a particular focus on Jewish issues. He currently serves on the investment committees of the New Jersey Performing Arts Center and the Adrienne Arsht Center for the Performing Arts in Miami. He has been a guest lecturer at the law and business schools at Harvard, Rutgers Law School, Florida International University and the Chartered Financial Analysts Institute.
