= White Mountains Insurance Group =

Insurance company

White Mountains Insurance Group, Ltd.
- Company type: Public
- Traded as: NYSE: WTM; Russell 1000 component
- Revenue: ▲US$1.18 billion (2020)
- Number of employees: 1,366 (2020)
- Website: whitemountains.com

White Mountains Insurance Group is a diversified insurance and related financial services holding company based in Hamilton, Bermuda. Redomiciled from Delaware, United States, on October 25, 1999, the company conducts most of its business through its insurance subsidiaries and other affiliates.

The company owned the automobile insurer Esurance before selling it to Allstate for $1 billion.

== Heritage ==
White Mountains Insurance Group began in the early 1980s by John J. Byrne, the man recruited by American Express to turn around troubled property and casualty insurer Fireman's Fund. When Byrne took Fireman's Fund public in 1985, it was the largest IPO in American history, and the insurer was sold to Allianz six years later. Upon completion of the Fireman's Fund sale in 1991, the remaining holding company and residual assets formed the starting point for the future White Mountains.

In December 2020, the company reported book value per share of $1,000.

== Leadership ==
White Mountains Insurance's current director is CEO George Manning Rountree.
