= Rooms + Spaces =

Canadian retail chain

Rooms + Spaces was a Canadian home goods retailer founded in August 2023 by Doug Putman.

== History ==
Following the closure of Bed Bath & Beyond operations in Canada, entrepreneur Doug Putman, the owner of Sunrise Records and Toys "R" Us Canada, acquired 21 former Bed Bath & Beyond locations. He planned to revive the chain in Canada under a new chain with the name Rooms + Spaces, under former Bed Bath & Beyond Canada general manager Greg Dyer's leadership.

The Rooms + Spaces chain opened in Canada beginning in August 2023 with 24 locations in Ontario, British Columbia, Alberta, Saskatchewan and Newfoundland and Labrador. It took over many of the former locations of Bed Bath & Beyond, and its subsidiary Buy Buy Baby. The stores were very similar to Bed Bath & Beyond, and also featured other brands owned by Putman, such as Toys "R" Us.

In February 2024, the chain had closed a significant number of stores, and much of the chains merchandise was moved to Toys "R" Us. The final stores in Edmonton and Brantford closed in early 2024. Some stores began defaulting on leases.

Putman has since stated that Rooms + Spaces was one of his biggest business failures.
