= Doug Putman =

Canadian business executive (born 1984)

- Born: Douglas Robert Putman; 25 March 1984 (age 42); Ancaster, Ontario, Canada
- Occupation: Businessman
- Board member of: Cleo (CAN); Crazy Forts! (CAN); Famous Toys (CAN); FYE (US); HMV (UK, EU, CAN); Makin' Waves Marine (CAN); Northern Reflections (CAN); Ricki's (CAN); Sunrise Records (CAN); Toys "R" Us (CAN)
- Website: https://putmaninvestments.com

Douglas Robert Putman (born 25 March 1984) is a Canadian businessman, best known for his ownership of Sunrise Records and Toys "R" Us Canada (bankrupt in 2026). Through his firm, Putman Investments, Putman has various endeavors involving music and entertainment, clothing, and home goods and real estate.

== Early life ==
Douglas Putman was born on 25 March 1984 and raised in Ancaster, Ontario. His family owned Everest Toys, a toy distributor, which he started working for in 2010.

== Career ==
=== Canada ===
==== Sunrise Records and HMV Canada ====
In October 2014, Putman acquired Sunrise Records and began opening new locations. In February 2017, it was announced that Putman had acquired the lease agreements from HMV Canada after it fell into receivership, converting these premises into Sunrise Records stores, massively increasing the number of Sunrise Records locations from 10 to 70.

In February 2024, Sunrise Records announced that HMV Canada would return as a concession in Toys "R" Us locations.

==== Toys "R" Us Canada ====
In August 2021, Putman announced he would buy Toys "R" Us Canada and Babies "R" Us Canada from Fairfax Financial. Starting in 2025, unprofitable Toys "R" Us Canada locations were closed, reducing the chain from approximately 103 stores to 22 stores as of January 2026 and has gone into creditor protection as of February 3rd, 2026. Toys "R" Us filed for bankrupsy in October 2026 with $302 million owing to unsecured creditors.

==== Northern Reflections, Cleo, and Ricki's ====
In January 2025 it was announced that Putman had purchased women’s retailer Northern Reflections, which operates over 100 stores across Canada for over 16 million dollars. Several months later Putman also purchased retailers Cleo and Ricki's out of administration adding over 100 more stores to his apparel empire. for a reported 20 million dollars.

==== Everest Toys (formerly) ====
In August 2025, Everest Toys was placed into receivership by TD Bank due to significant financial issues, including a $25 million debt and the resignation of its board, closing the company. It had previously supplied Toys "R" Us Canada.

==== Rooms + Spaces (formerly) ====
In May 2023, Putman acquired 21 Canadian retail locations from Bed Bath & Beyond and turned them into Rooms + Spaces. In total, 24 Rooms + Space locations were opened. Most stores were closed after being open for only a few months, as the leases were defaulted. By February 2024, only two Rooms + Spaces locations remained open (at West Edmonton Mall and Brantford.), the Brantford location was then later closed and moved to Hamilton as an outlet store. The Rooms + Spaces chain ceased operations around June 2024, with overstocks appearing in Toys "R" Us Canada.

==== T. Kettle (formerly) ====
In October 2020, Putman founded tea shop T. Kettle, rebranding 45 former DavidsTea locations. As of April 2024, only two locations remained open. The final T.Kettle shop closed on December 22, 2025.

=== United States ===
==== FYE ====
In January 2020, Putman saved entertainment chain FYE from bankruptcy for $10 million USD, which included Sam Goody and Suncoast Motion Picture Company.

=== United Kingdom and Europe ===
==== HMV ====
On 5 February 2019, a number of HMV locations were acquired by Sunrise Records, owned by Putman, for £883,000, saving 100 stores and 1,600 jobs. The company continues to trade under the HMV and Fopp brands under license from Hilco Capital. Putman would reopen HMV in Ireland in 2023. In November 2023, HMV expanded into Belgium. In November 2025, HMV expanded into the Netherlands.

==== Attempted acquisitions ====
In August 2023, Putman attempted to save the British home goods retailer Wilko from administration, but was unable to form a rescue deal in time, with the retailer collapsing. In March 2024, Putman expressed interest in rescuing the British cosmetics chain, The Body Shop, from administration. In January 2025, Putman expressed interest in the high-street WHSmith stores that were being disposed by the business, however they were sold to Modella Capital and rebranded as TGJones. In September 2025, Putman expressed interest in saving Claire's UK.

== List of active companies ==
Active companies owned by Doug Putman include:

- Putman Investments
  - Sunrise Records
    - HMV
      - Fopp
    - FYE
      - Sam Goody
      - Suncoast Motion Picture Company
    - HMV Canada
  - Toys "R" Us Canada (Note: 4 locations as of November 2026)
    - Babies "R" Us Canada (Note: 4 locations as of November 2026)
  - Northern Reflections
  - Ricki’s
  - Cleo
  - Crazy Forts!
  - Makin' Waves Marine
  - Famous Toys
    - Halloween Alley
    - Massive Toy Blowout
