= 831 Stories =

831 Stories is a publisher of contemporary romance fiction, co-founded by Erica Cerulo and Claire Mazur and launched on September 10, 2024. The 831 Stories books are distributed by Simon & Schuster.

The company's name is an ode to "I Love You," in 90's pager code text, eight letters, three words, one meaning.

== History ==
Cerulo and Mazur met while students at the University of Chicago in 2002. They had an e-commerce site, 2010's Of A Kind; in 2012, they launched a newsletter and podcast, A Thing or Two. In 2015, Of A Kind was acquired by Bed, Bath and Beyond.

During the pandemic, Cerulo and Mazur became "immersed" in romance fiction as well as its companion fan fiction. They launched with four million dollars in funding.

In 2026, Hulu announced it was in development of Alexandra Romanoff's Big Fan.

== Style ==
They have a "distinctive marketing approach" using 360 strategy and approaching each book like an "album launch." 831 Stories books are packaged with merchandise, romance lit tropes and curated design including the signature cupid logo. They are considered novellas as each book is under 200 pages.

== Published works ==
YEAR	TITLE	AUTHOR	CIT.
2024	Big Fan	Alexandra Romanoff	
	Hardly Strangers	A.C. Robinson	
2025	Comedic Timing	Upasana Barath	
	Set Piece	Lana Schartz	
	Square Waves	Alexandra Romanoff	
	Exit Lane	Erica Veurink	
	Grape Juice	Eliza Dumais	
2026	Rooting Interest	Cat Disabato	
	Found Time	Caroline Goldstein	
	Major Gift	Tiffany Ezuma	
	Down To Earth	Julia Turshen	
	Double Standard	Mallory Thomas	
