= Music Zone =

- Company type: Private
- Industry: Entertainment Retail, Record store
- Founded: Longsight, Manchester (1984)
- Founder: Russ Grainger
- Defunct: 3 January 2007
- Fate: Administration
- Headquarters: Stockport, Greater Manchester, United Kingdom
- Number of locations: 104
- Area served: United Kingdom
- Key people: S Oliver, Managing Director; Nick Standing, Retail Director; Eren Ozagir, Marketing Director.
- Products: Books; DVDs; Games; Music; T-Shirts
- Revenue: £70.4 million
- Owner: Music Zones Services Limited
- Number of employees: 1,100
- Parent: Fopp

Music Zone was a music retailer in the United Kingdom, formed in Levenshulme in 1984, as a market stall in Longsight, Manchester.

== History ==
Soon after, Music Zone opened its first permanent shop in Stockport, and began to expand in the Manchester region, rebranding itself to Music Zone Trade Direct and positioning itself as a value retailer. In February 2005, Music Zone was sold in a management buy-out for £12 million, backed financially by the private equity firm Lloyds Development Capital (LDC), as well as funds from the board of directors.

In the twelve months to 31 May 2005, the company made a £4,000 pre tax loss on sales of £70.4 million. Then in January 2006, the company bought forty one outlets from collapsed chain MVC, allowing Music Zone to expand nationwide. All stores were branded to 'Music Zone'.

The MVC acquisitions took the estate to 104 stores making the chain the third largest specialist entertainment retailer in the United Kingdom, less than thirty stores behind nearest rival Virgin Megastore.

== Financial problems ==
On 27 December 2006, the Bank of Ireland withdrew its loan and future working capital facilities, and decided to recover its debts without notice and with immediate effect. As a result, on 3 January 2007, Music Zone went into administration, with thirty one stores across the United Kingdom closing two weeks later.

The cause of the collapse was attributed to "challenging trading conditions and weak pre Christmas trading, amid increasing competition and aggressive pricing across the DVD and music market." By 26 January 2007, all stores were closed. Music Zone's Head Office was closed on 30 January. By the time of closure, the company debts totalled £31 million

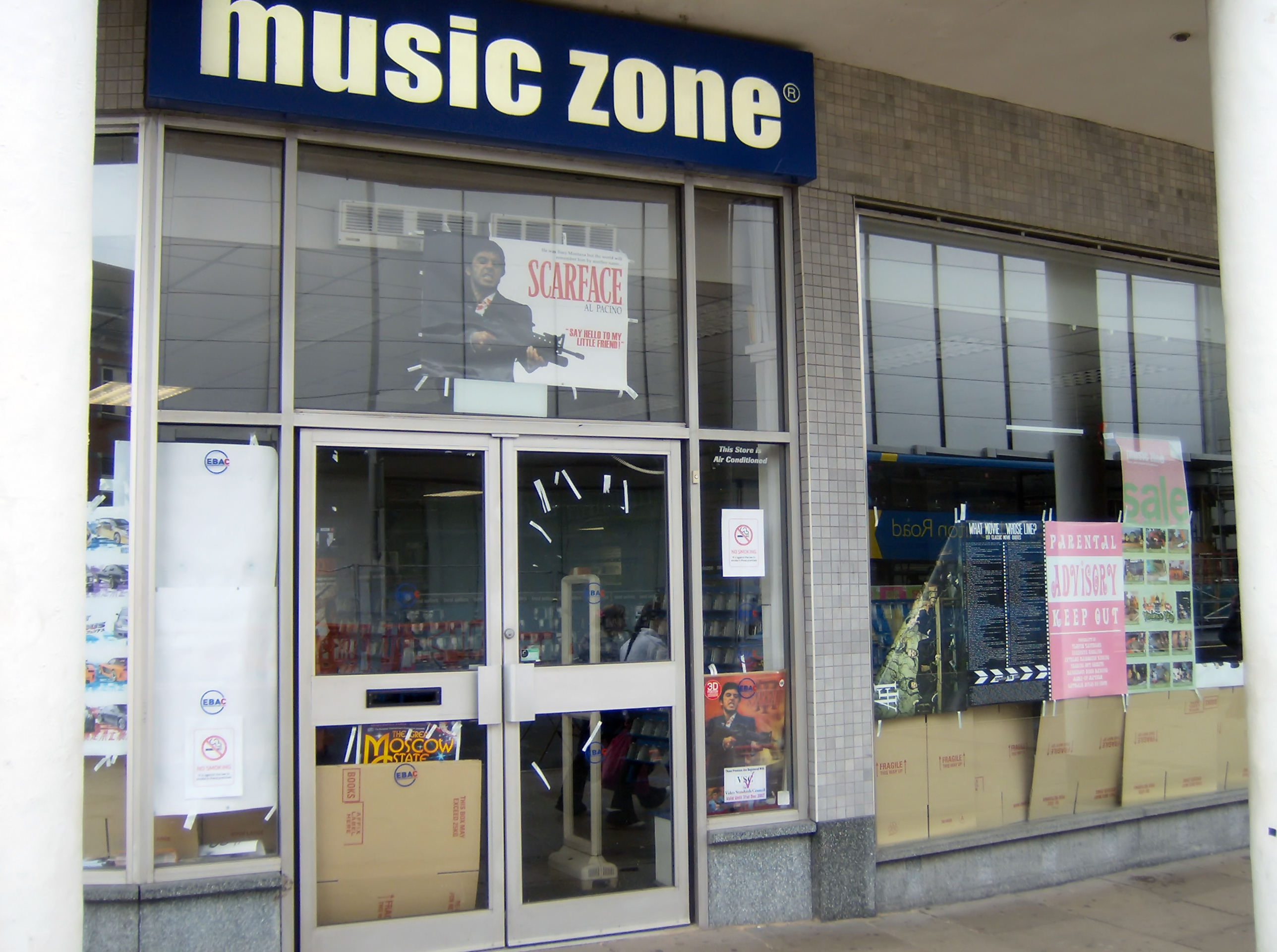
A closed Music Zone store in Exeter in Devon, August 2007

== Fopp ==
On 5 February 2007, retailer Fopp announced it would be taking over 67 of the remaining stores in addition to some of Music Zone's head office and warehouse facilities. In March 2007, Fopp had difficulties rebuilding supplier contracts, and shut down a great number of the higher maintenance stores. On 29 June 2007, Fopp went into administration, resulting in the closure of all remaining Music Zone shops.
