= HMV =

Entertainment retailer

Sunrise Records and Entertainment Limited / Lawson Entertainment, Inc.
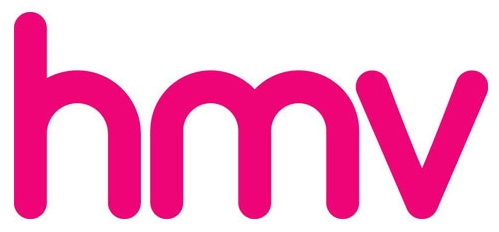
- Logo used since 2007

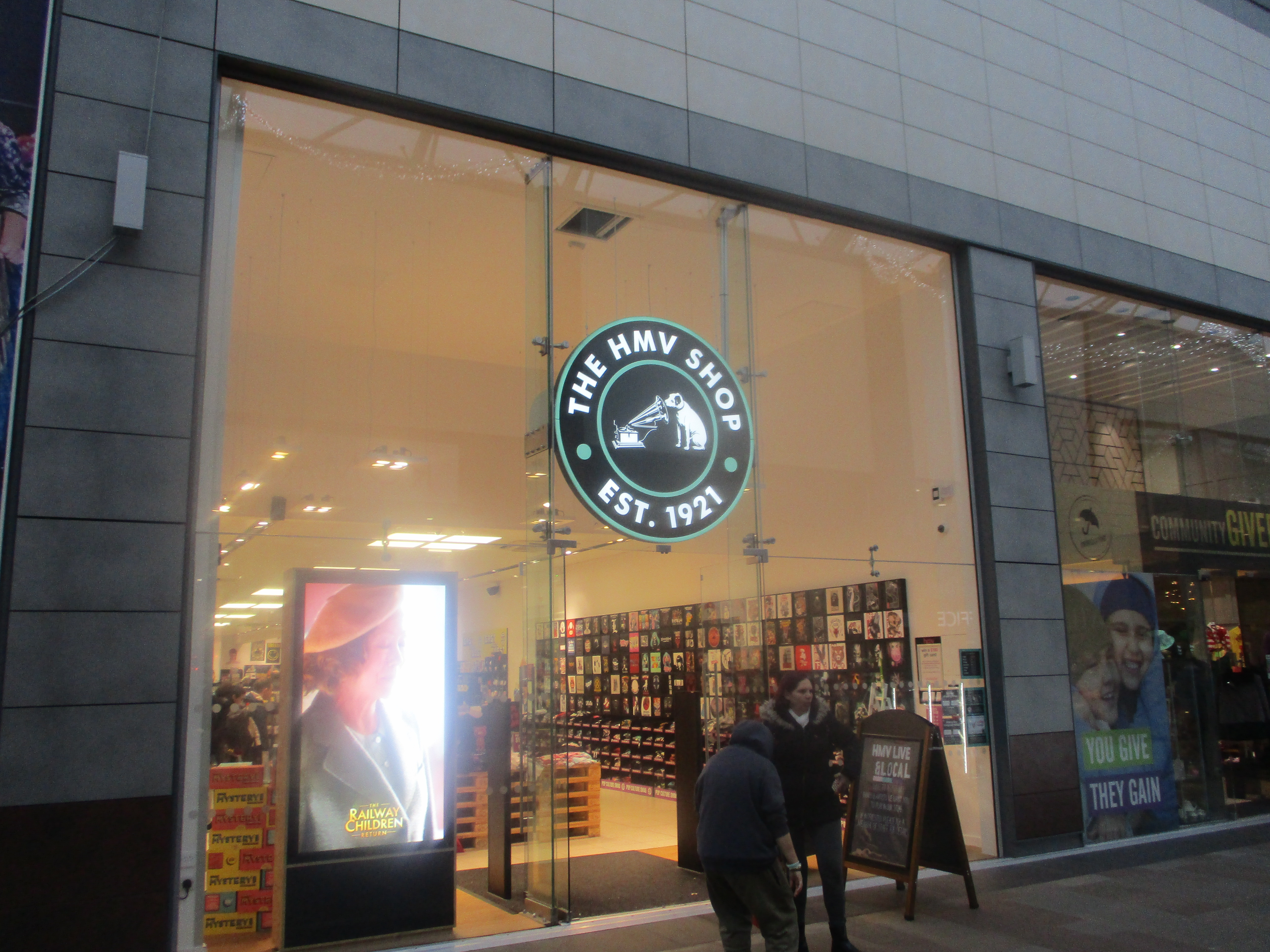
- The exterior of a HMV location at Trinity Walk in Wakefield
- Type: Subsidiary
- Industry: Entertainment retailer
- Founded: 20 July 1921; 105 years ago
- Headquarters: London, England; Tokyo, Japan (Lawson)
- Area served: United Kingdom; Belgium; Canada; Ireland; Netherlands; Japan (Lawson)
- Key people: Philip Halliday (managing director); Toru Noguchi (president and director, Japan)
- Products: Music film television merchandise technology video games books
- Owner: Sunrise Records (United Kingdom, Ireland, Belgium, Canada and the Netherlands) (Note: Brand owned by Mermaid (Brands) Limited, a Hilco Capital company, as recorded on the Intellectual Property Office); Lawson (Japan)
- Subsidiaries: Fopp (UK)
- Website: www.hmv.com

HMV is an international music and entertainment retailer, founded in London, England in 1921. The brand is owned by Hilco Capital and operated by Sunrise Records, except in Japan, where it is owned and operated by Lawson.

The inaugural shop was opened on Oxford Street in London by the Gramophone Company, who had already established the His Master's Voice symbol on their sound equipment, and from 1909, as its own record label. In the 1960s, HMV became a chain across London, and expanded nationwide in the 1970s. It expanded internationally in the mid-1980s, and opened its 100th UK shop in 1997.

In 1998, the retail operations were divested from EMI (successor to the Gramophone Company), to form what would become HMV Group plc. In 2007, HMV bought rival retailer, Fopp, as well divesting its Japanese business. In April 2013, HMV was rescued by Hilco Capital for an estimated £50 million after falling into administration. In February 2019, the Canadian retailer Sunrise Records rescued 100 of the 127 HMV shops from Hilco after a second administration, but with Hilco retaining ownership of the HMV brand.

In May 2023, Sunrise Records announced HMV would return to Ireland, followed by an announcement in November 2023 that it would also enter the Belgian market. In February 2024, Sunrise Records announced HMV would re-enter the Canadian market as a store-within-a-store concept within Toys "R" Us locations. In October 2025, Sunrise Records announced that HMV would open in the Netherlands.

== History ==
=== Origins ===
In 1898, Francis Barraud painted His Master's Voice, which depicted his late dog, Nipper, listening to a phonograph. The painting and subsequent trademark rights would be sold in 1899 to the Gramophone Company, using it on its sound equipment, and in 1909, created their His Master's Voice record label.

In 1921, the Gramophone Company opened the first dedicated His Master's Voice shop at 363 Oxford Street, London, in a former men's clothing shop. Composer Edward Elgar participated in the opening ceremonies. In March 1931 the Gramophone Company merged with Columbia Graphophone Company to form Electric and Musical Industries Ltd (EMI), with the Gramophone Company becoming part of EMI.

The original HMV shop was severely damaged by a fire in 1937, but was rebuilt and reopened two years later on 8 May 1939. Sir Thomas Beecham opened the new shop.

=== Expansion ===
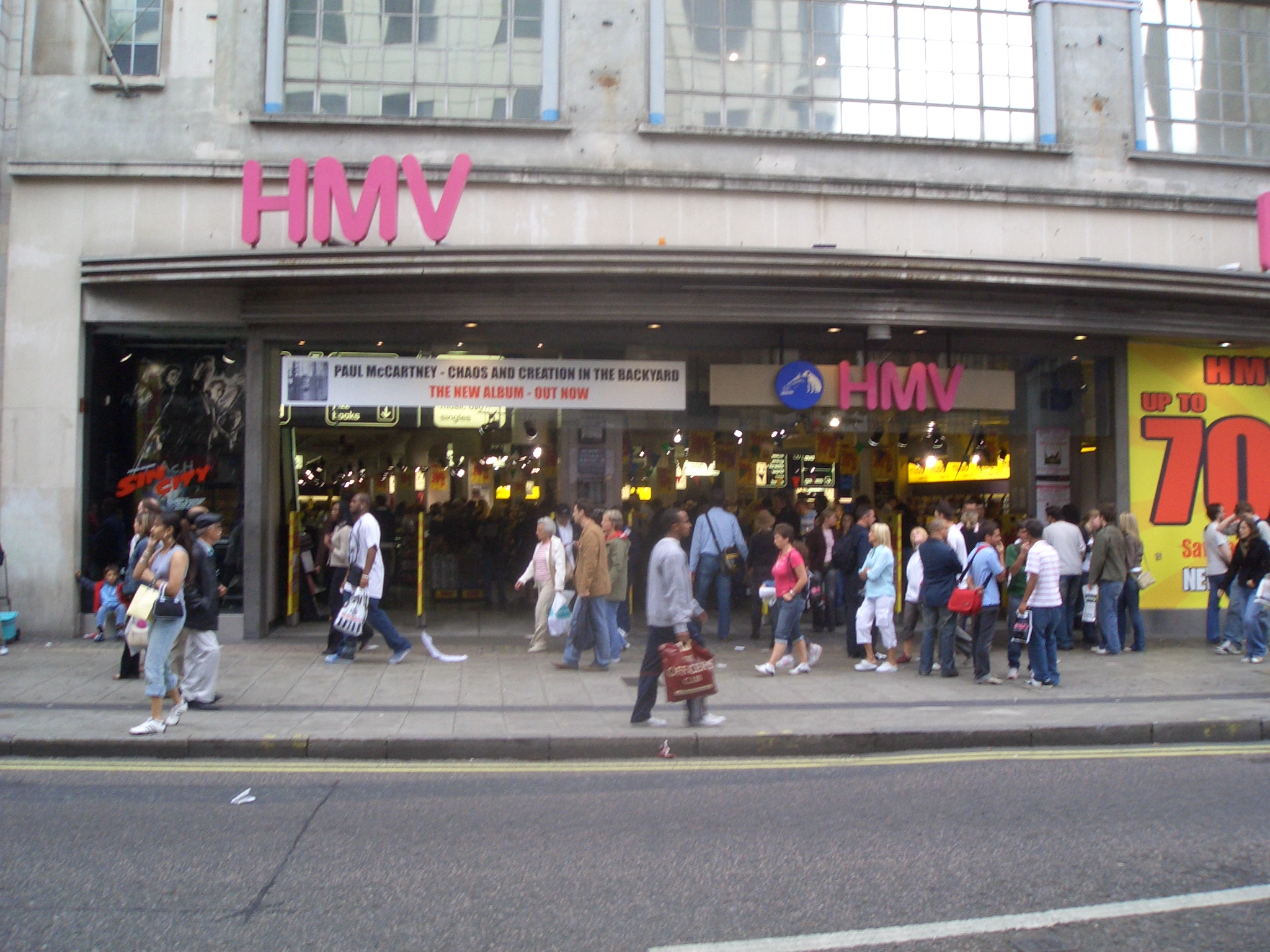
HMV's former flagship branch at 150–154 Oxford Street, London. It was later converted into a Sports Direct shop in 2015.

In 1966, HMV began expanding its retail operations in London. Throughout the 1970s, the company continued to expand, doubling in size, and in six years became the country's leading specialist music retailer. It faced strong competition, however, from Virgin Megastores, established in 1976, and from Our Price, established in 1972, which had numerous high street retail shops around the UK. Subsequently, HMV overtook Our Price in popularity and threatened its existence, having established a chain of newer and larger shops.

The company opened its flagship shop at a new location at 150–154 Oxford Street in 1986, announcing it was the largest record shop in the world at the time, and the official opening was attended by Bob Geldof and Michael Hutchence. Growth continued for a third decade into the 1990s, with the company reaching over 320 shops including in 1990 its first shop in the U.S. located at 86th and Lexington in New York City, which was the largest music shop in North America at the time. HMV celebrated its 75-year anniversary in 1996.

In February 1998, EMI entered into a joint venture with Advent International to form HMV Media Group led by Alan Giles, which acquired HMV's shops and Dillons, leaving EMI with a holding of around 45%. The new joint venture then bought the Waterstones chain of bookshops to merge with Dillons.

=== Flotation ===
By 2002, EMI's holding in HMV Media was 43%, with Advent International owning 40% and management the remainder. The company floated on the London Stock Exchange later in the year as HMV Group plc, leaving EMI with only a token holding.

HMV operated a loyalty scheme branded as "purehmv", first launched in August 2003, but subsequently closed and relaunched in 2008. The scheme awarded cardholders points for purchases, which could be collected and redeemed on a number of rewards including vouchers, memorabilia and signed merchandise. "purehmv" has since closed and will be replaced by a new loyalty scheme, the launch date of which is yet to be announced.

The group became susceptible to a takeover following a poor period of trading up to Christmas 2005. Private equity firm Permira made a £762 million conditional bid for the group (based on 190p a share) on 7 February 2006, which was rejected by HMV as an insufficient valuation of the company. Permira made a second offer which increased the value, although HMV declined it on 13 March 2006, subsequently issuing a statement that the offer undervalued the medium and long term prospects for the company, resulting in Permira withdrawing from bidding.

=== Acquisitions ===
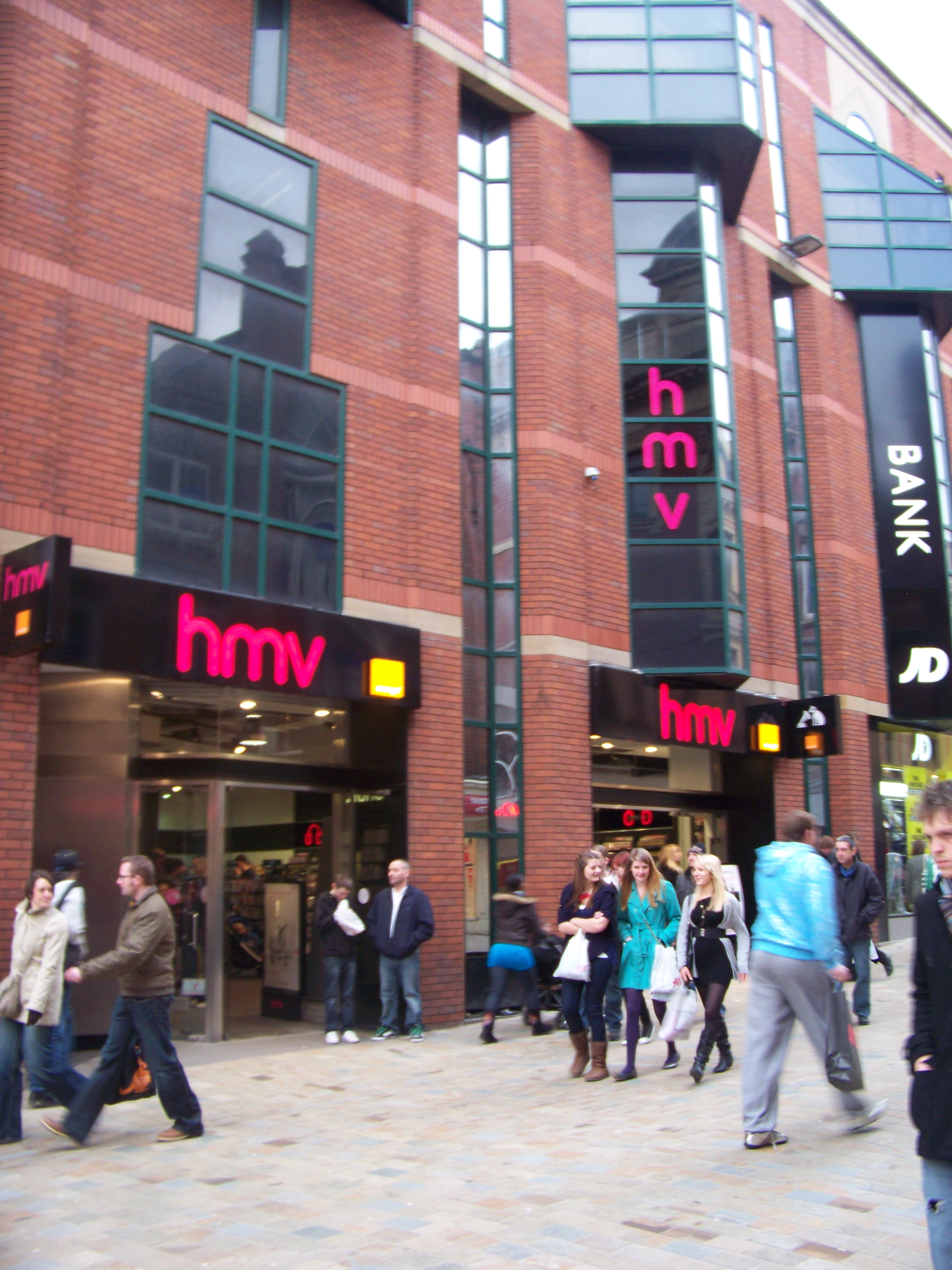
A large HMV branch in Leeds incorporating an Orange shop

In 2006, the HMV Group purchased the Ottakar's book chain and merged it into Waterstones. The merger tied into HMV's strategy for growth, as many of the Ottakar's branches were in smaller towns. The Competition Commission provisionally cleared HMV Group, through Waterstones, for takeover of the Ottakar's group on 30 March 2006, stating that the takeover would "not result in a substantial lessening of competition". Waterstones then announced that it had successfully negotiated a takeover of Ottakar's on 31 May 2006. All 130 Ottakar's shops were rebranded as Waterstones prior to Christmas 2006. In March 2007, new group CEO Simon Fox announced a 10% reduction over three years in the enlarged Waterstones total shop space, comprising mostly dual location shops created by the acquisition of Ottakar's.

On 29 June 2007, the entertainment retailer Fopp went into administration, with the closure of 81 shops and 800 staff made redundant. On 31 July HMV bought the brand and six shops that it said had traded profitably, saving around 70 jobs.

On 1 September 2008, HMV launched "Get Closer", a social networking site allowing users to import their own music library, rivalling other providers including digital music stores Napster and the iTunes Store. The site was closed in September 2009.

On 24 December 2008, HMV's rival Zavvi, successor to entertainment retailer Virgin Megastores, entered administration. On 14 January 2009 a placing announcement by HMV revealed that it intended to acquire 14 of Zavvi's shops. On 18 February 2009 five additional Zavvi shops were purchased by HMV Group, to be rebranded as HMV outlets. An additional former Zavvi shop in Exeter's Princesshay development was also added. The acquisitions were investigated and cleared by the Office of Fair Trading in April 2009.

In the 2008 MCV Industry Excellence Awards, HMV was given the title Entertainment Retailer of the Year.

In January 2009, HMV bought a 50% stake in MAMA Group, forming a joint venture with the group called the Mean Fiddler Group. The deal introduced the HMV brand to live music venues, including the Hammersmith Apollo. On 23 December 2009, it bought the whole of the MAMA Group in a live music takeover deal worth £46 million.

In September 2009, HMV bought 50% of 7digital for £7.7 million, as part of a strategy to increase its digital content offering. 7digital provided HMV's music download service, and the company planned to introduce an e-books service for Waterstone's.

In October 2009, HMV established a joint venture with Curzon Cinemas as part of chief executive Simon Fox's plan to bring cinemas to HMV and Waterstone's shops across England. The first trial cinema opened above the existing HMV shop in Wimbledon, in a former storage room converted into three separate screens and a bar. It has its own entrance, allowing access outside shop hours, and one within the shop. The trial was deemed a success, and it had been planned to open additional cinemas in HMV's Cheltenham shop, and Waterstone's in Piccadilly, London.

On 5 January 2011, HMV announced that profits would be at the lower end of analysts' forecasts due to falling sales, resulting in the share price falling by 20% and an announcement of the group's intention to close 40 HMV shops, as well as 20 Waterstone's bookshops, mainly in towns and cities where the company operated at multiple locations. The first of the shop closures began at the end of January 2011.

The sale of Waterstone's to A&NN Capital Fund Management for £53 million was completed on 29 June 2011, and was approved by the vast majority of shareholders at an emergency general meeting.

HMV sold the Hammersmith Apollo to AEG Live and Eventim in May 2012 for £32 million. It sold the remainder of MAMA Group to Lloyds Development Capital in December 2012 for £7.3 million, which also included the company's 50% stake in Mean Fiddler Group.

=== Administration (2013) ===
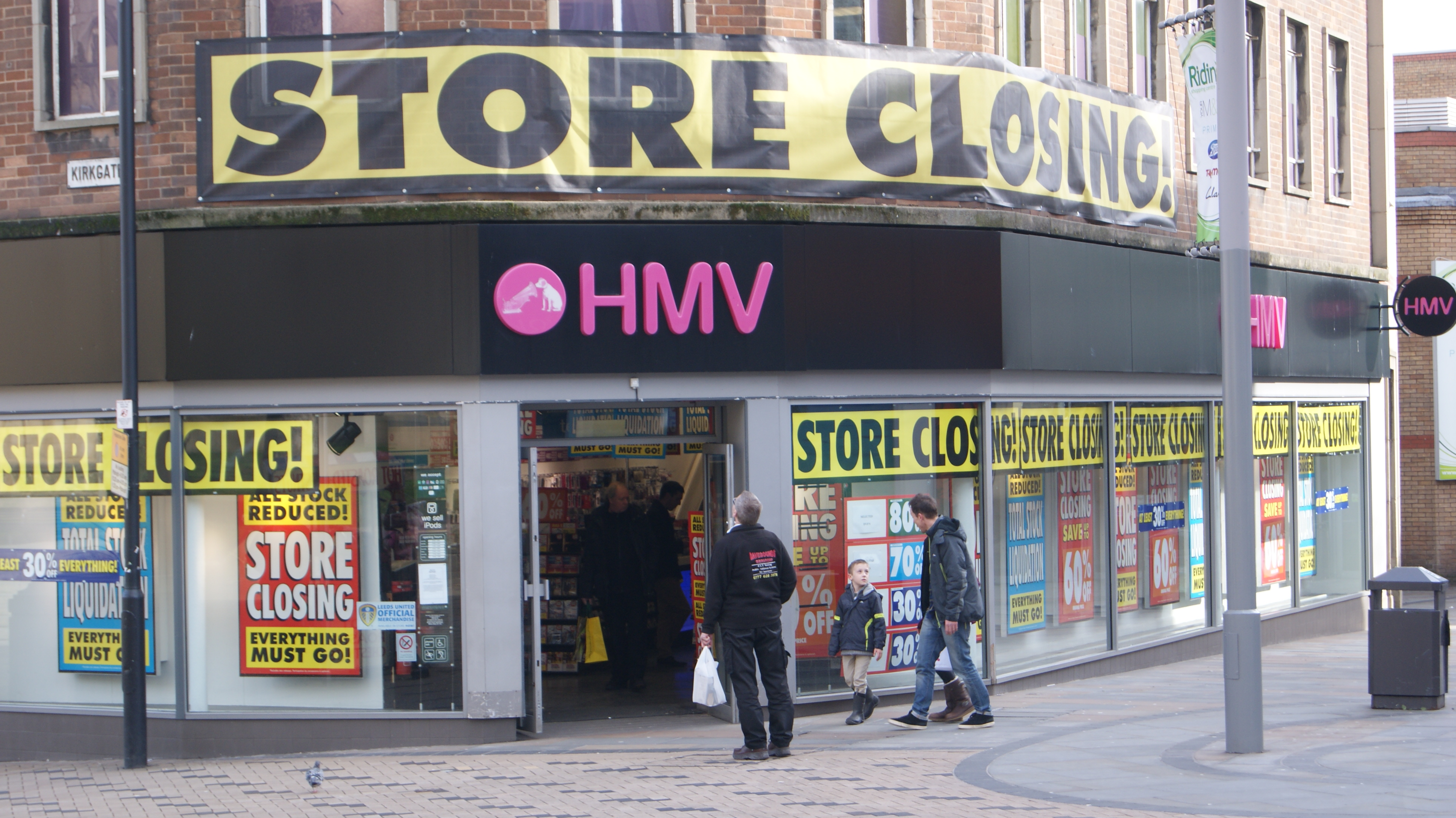
A branch in Wakefield closing as part of the group administration (March 2013). This unit has since been occupied by Waterstones.

On 15 January 2013, HMV Group appointed Deloitte as company administrators and suspended shares, putting its 4,350 UK employees at the risk of redundancy. Gift vouchers were initially declared void since holders are classified as unsecured creditors to whom the company owed the value, but were accepted again from 22 January 2013.

Restructuring firm Hilco UK bought HMV's debt from its creditors The Royal Bank of Scotland and Lloyds Banking Group, as a step towards potentially taking control of the company. It was revealed that the total debt Hilco had bought amounted to around £110 million, and that HMV owed around £20 million in tax to HM Revenue and Customs at the time of its entry into administration.

On 31 January 2013, it was reported that 190 redundancies had been made at the head office and distribution centres.

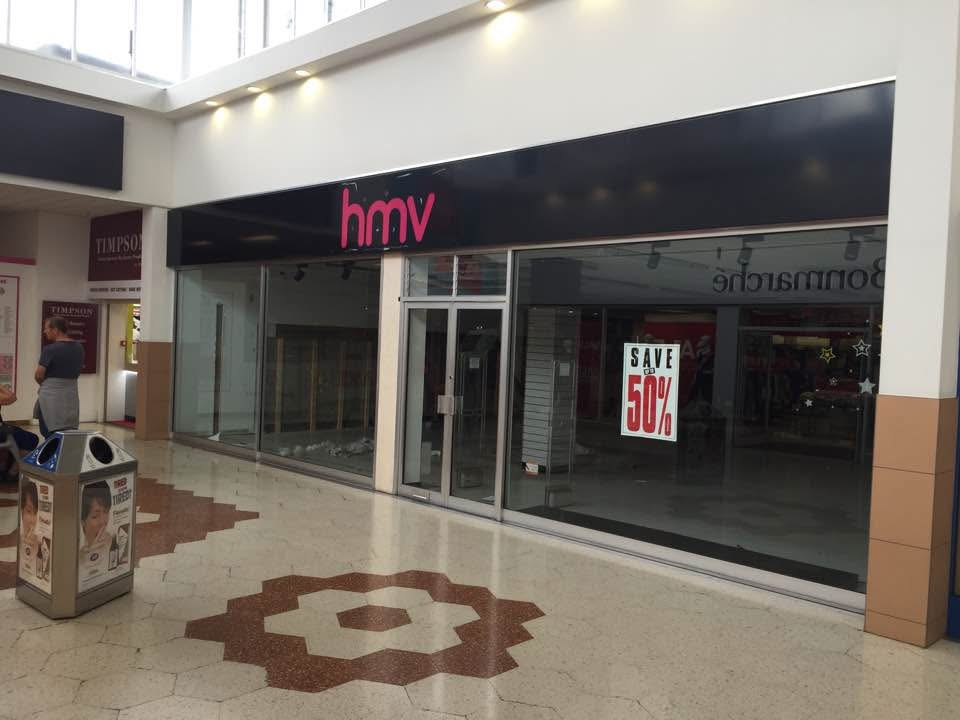
A branch in Wellingborough closed as part of the group administration (March 2013), sits empty following its closure.

On 7 February 2013, Deloitte confirmed that 66 shops had been identified for closure. No fixed date was given for the closures but they were expected to take place in the following two months. The next day, Deloitte confirmed that an additional 60 redundancies, including the chief executive Trevor Moore, had been made at the group's offices in London, Marlow and Solihull. Deloitte confirmed on 20 February 2013 that an additional 37 shops would close. On 26 February 2013, six shops were sold to supermarket chain Morrisons.

On 28 February 2013, eight shops in Hong Kong and Singapore were sold to AID Partners Capital Limited and the operation then became independent from HMV Group that was bought by Hilco UK. This transaction also enabled AID Partners Capital Limited to own the rights to use the HMV brand in Hong Kong, Macau, China, Taiwan and Singapore.

By 23 March 2013, Deloitte was seeking to complete a deal to sell 120 shops as a going concern. The decision to close several shops that had previously been identified for closure were reversed following talks with landlords.

=== Hilco ownership (2013–2019) ===
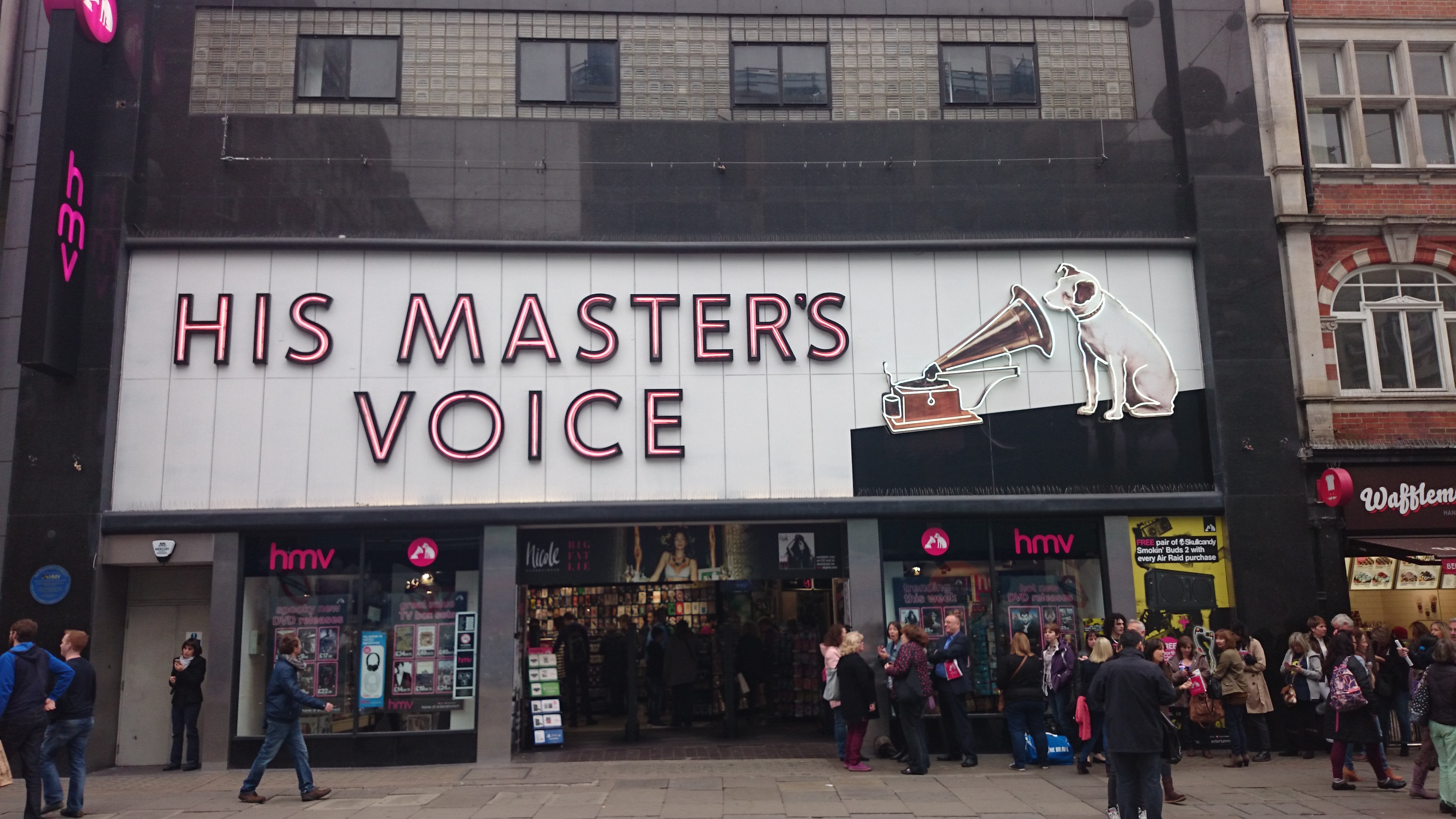
HMV reopened its original shop at 363 Oxford Street (previously Foot Locker until 2010) in October 2013. This shop was closed on 5 February 2019 following the purchase of HMV by Sunrise Records. The location was later turned into an American candy outlet in 2022, and was then finally reopened in November 2023.

On 5 April 2013, Hilco UK announced that it had acquired HMV, taking the company out of administration and saving 141 of its shops and around 2,500 jobs. The total included 25 shops that had previously been selected for closure by Deloitte during the administration process. All nine Fopp shops which HMV owned were also included in the purchase. The takeover deal was estimated at £50 million.

Following the purchase by Hilco UK, it was reported that the company was seeking to reduce the number of shop staff across the business, as part of an effort to save £7.8 million on the wages budget. Shops would lose security staff, cashiers and supervisors, with managers required to provide cover.

HMV launched a music download service in October 2013 (www.hmvdigital.com), provided by 7digital, which includes iOS and Android apps.

The company moved its flagship Oxford Street shop back to the original site at 363 Oxford Street on 23 October 2013. HMV's existing flagship shop at 150–154 Oxford Street, formerly the largest music shop in the world, closed on 14 January 2014.

By 2014, HMV had gained the second highest share of the UK entertainment market, behind Amazon. The company's filing to Companies House in September 2014 revealed it had made a profit of £17 million in the 11 months since it had entered administration. In January 2015, HMV overtook Amazon to become the largest retailer of physical music in the UK.

HMV relaunched its online shop in June 2015, providing CDs, DVDs, Blu-ray Discs, and LP records for online order and home delivery with exclusive stock also available.

In June 2015, HMV relaunched an online shop to accompany its existing music download service.

However, the originally safe shops of York, Soilhull, Portsmouth and Belfast shut.

=== Sunrise ownership (2019–present) ===
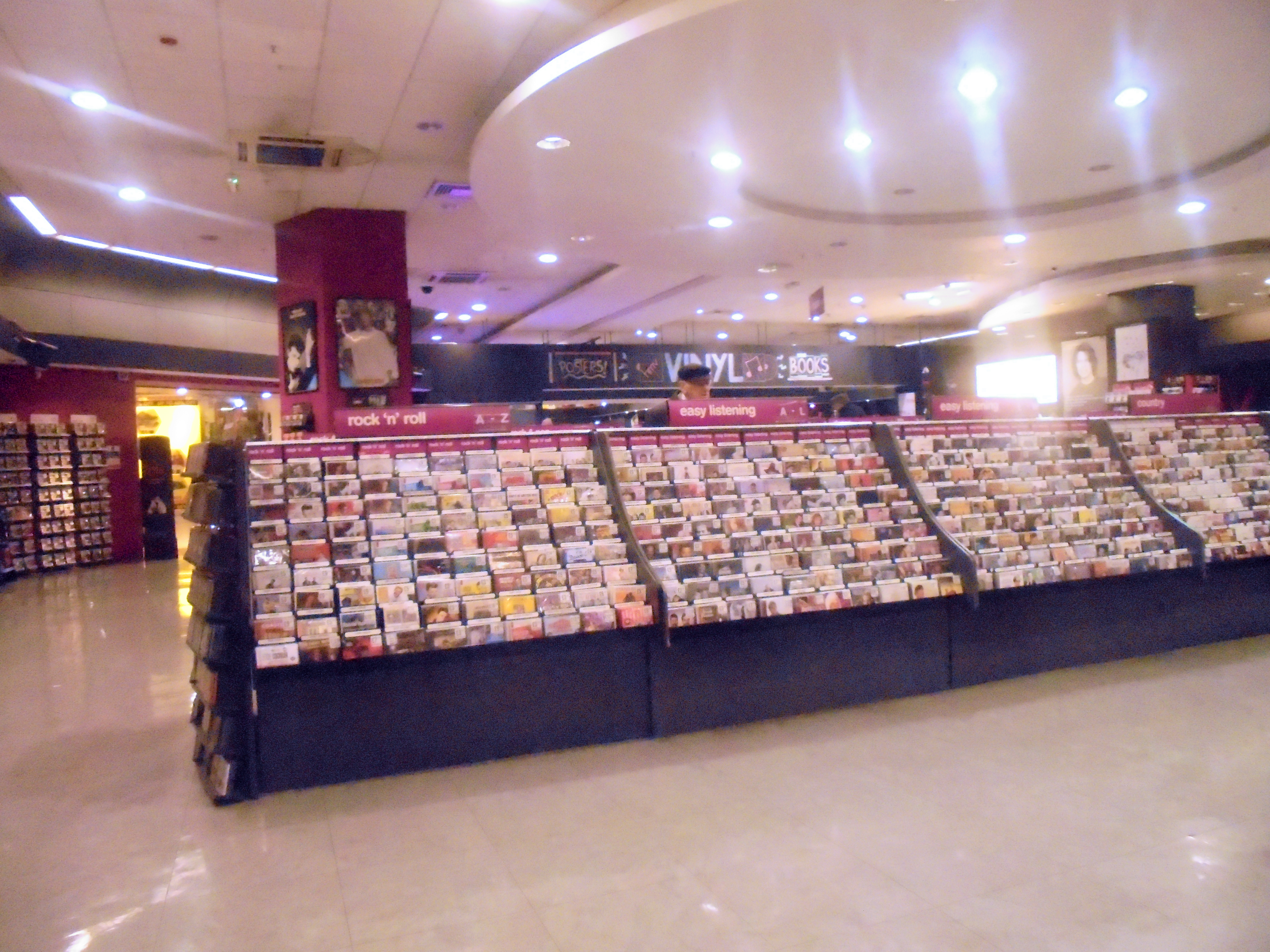
Interior of HMV on Lands Lane in Leeds in 2019.

On 28 December 2018, HMV confirmed it had again been placed into administration. Hilco UK cited the "tsunami" of retail competition as the reason for the move. On 5 February 2019, Canadian record shop chain Sunrise Records announced its acquisition of HMV Retail Ltd. from Hilco UK for an undisclosed amount. Sunrise had previously acquired the leases for over 70 HMV locations in Canada after HMV Canada entered receivership, which expanded the Ontario-based retailer into a national chain. Sunrise plans to maintain the HMV chain and five Fopp shops, but immediately closed 27 locations, including the flagship Oxford Street branch and other locations with high rent costs.

Company founder Doug Putman stated that he planned to increase the chain's emphasis on vinyl phonograph sales as part of the turnaround plan: Sunrise's leverage of the vinyl revival had helped bolster the Canadian locations' performance after the shops' transitions from HMV, having sold at least 500,000 vinyl LPs in 2017 alone. Putman argued that, despite the growth of digital music sales and streaming, "talk about the demise of the physical business is sometimes a bit exaggerated, especially in music specialists. Most of the decline is coming from nontraditional sellers like the grocery chains. We'll be here for quite some time."

On 25 February 2019, the Financial Times reported that the Sunrise acquisition was valued at £883,000. Following subsequent negotiations with its landlords, by late-February, HMV reopened 13 of its shops (including one Fopp shop).

The shop in Belfast, which had previously re-opened up in March 2014 after a £1 million pound refurbishment, was threatened with closure in February 2019. However, a deal was reached with Frasers Group which allowed the shop to continue trading.

In October 2019, the new owners opened the HMV Vault on Dale End, Birmingham, billed as Europe's biggest entertainment shop and stocking tens of thousands of CDs and vinyl records and other products.

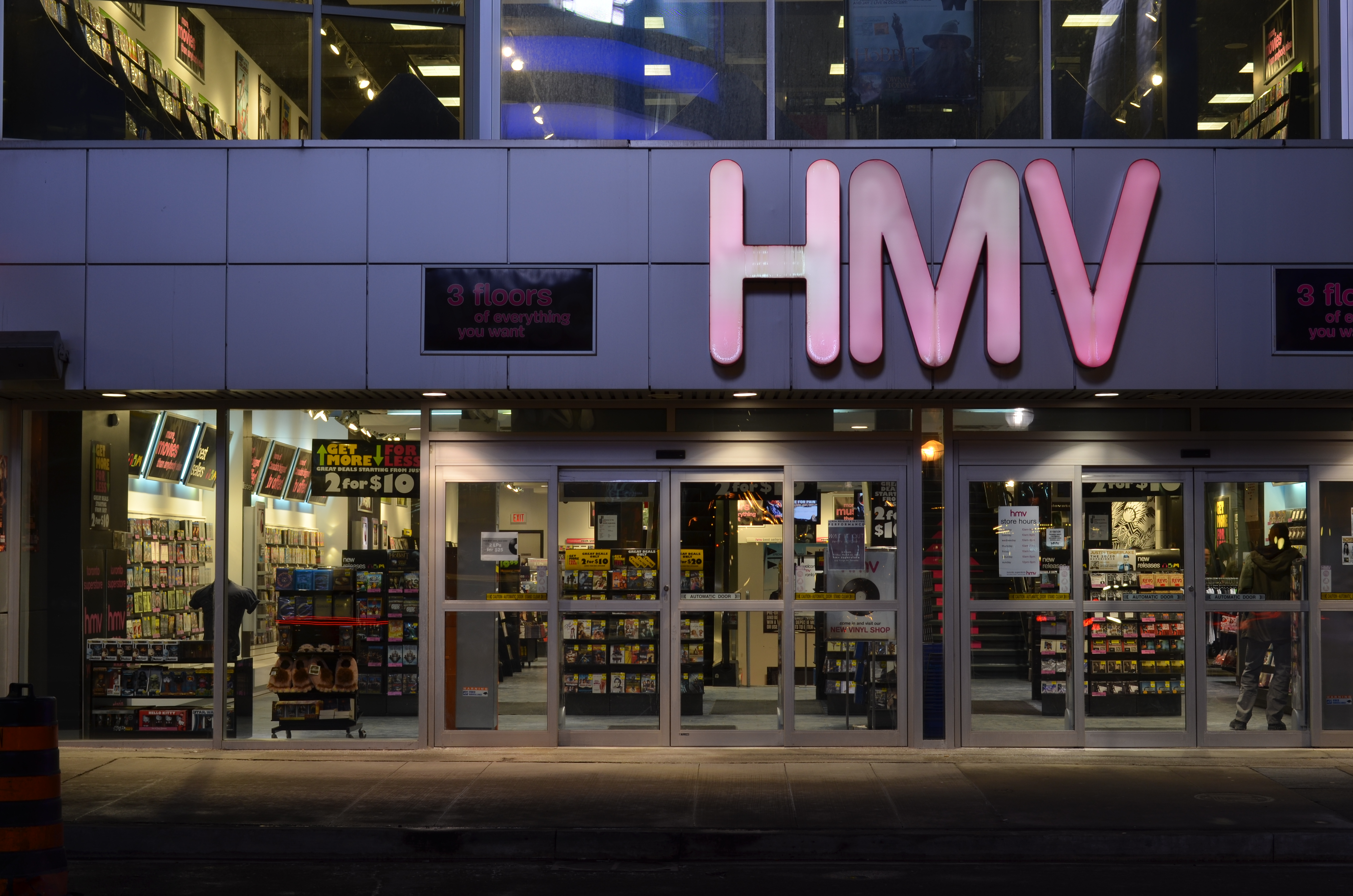
The former flagship Canadian HMV, located at Yonge Street in Toronto. Nipper is notably missing from the fascia, as it is owned by a different entity in Canada.

==== COVID-19 pandemic and 100th birthday (2020–2021) ====
From 22 March to 15 June, and then from 5 November to 2 December 2020 and from 4 January 2021 to 12 April 2021 (in England), all HMV shops were closed due to the COVID-19 pandemic.

Into the 2020s, HMV began opening new and relocated shops, including in locations which previously had HMV branches that had earlier shut, such as Solihull. In some cases these new outlets were opened in shops vacated by the demise of other retail chains, particularly Arcadia Group, with an HMV shop opened in Dunfermline premises previously occupied by Burton Menswear and Dorothy Perkins, a return to Broadway Shopping Centre, Bexleyheath – again in former Burton/Perkins premises – nine years after the closure of their previous shop in the town, and a relocation in Wigan from a smaller prior site to larger premises vacated by Topshop/Topman.

In March 2021, The Empire music venue in Coventry announced it would relocate and would rename itself as the HMV Empire as part of a sponsorship deal.

In July 2021, HMV celebrated its 100th birthday. In celebration, the firm released 37 limited edition vinyl albums. A 100 track CD compilation entitled Now That's What I Call HMV was also released. The album was only available to buy at HMV shops, and online on HMV's website, plus eBay.

In October 2021, the company began to rebrand, using the motto "The HMV Shop" for shopfronts and social media; the previous logo is still used in most shops (including the flagship HMV Vault shop), and the website.

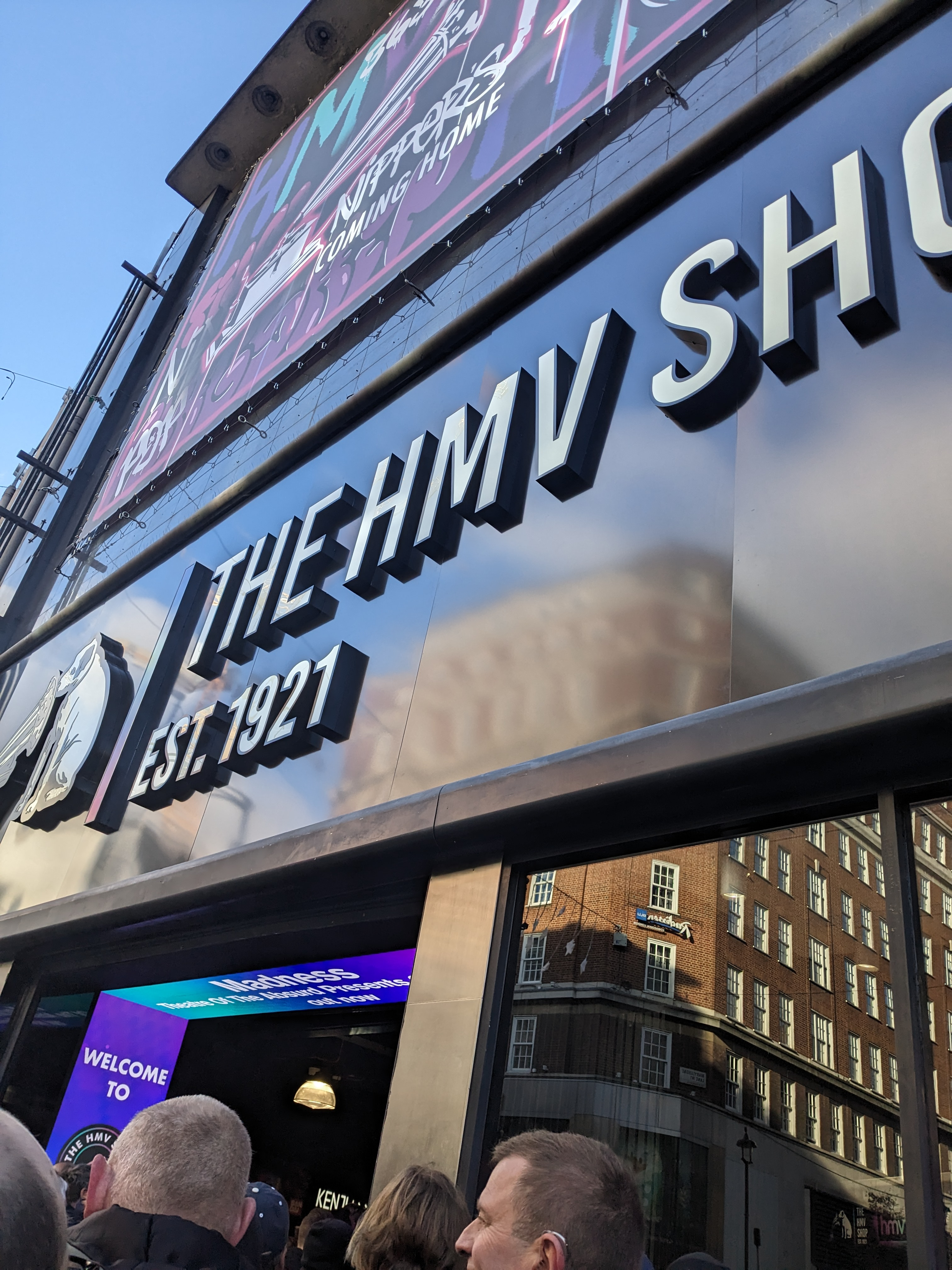
The Oxford Street shop re-opened in November 2023 after four years of closure.

In April 2023, it was confirmed that HMV had signed up to reopen a new-format shop in their original home at 363 Oxford Street after four years away, during which time the premises had been occupied temporarily by "American candy" outlets, along with other vacated shops on the street. This will be, following runs from 1921 to 2000 and 2013–2019, HMV's third stint at 363 Oxford Street.

On 18 May 2023, Sunrise Records announced that HMV would re-enter the Irish market again with a shop on Dublin's Henry Street, in a unit previously occupied by the company during their first incarnation. The shop opened on 30 June 2023.

On 21 July 2024, Phil Halliday, the managing director of HMV announced; that there was an increase of customers buying physical media formats of films and television shows commercially released on DVD and Blu-ray.

On 12 October 2026, it was announced that HMV's flagship store at 363 Oxford Street was to close down again in March 2027, with the company blaming a doubling of rental costs for the site. The company further stated that it was actively looking for a site to open a new flagship store in London. Chinese variety retailer MINISO is set to take its place.

== International operations ==
=== Belgium (2023–present) ===
In November 2023, Sunrise Records announced that HMV would expand into Belgium. In March 2024, it was announced HMV would open its second Belgian location.

=== Canada (1986–2017, 2024–present) ===
In 1986, EMI Music Canada purchased the Mister Sound chain. EMI then attempted to rebrand the sites as His Master's Voice shops, but were not granted the rights from RCA who own the rights to the "His Master's Voice" and Nipper trademarks in the U.S. and Canada. However, EMI were not prevented from using just the 'HMV' initials, which were sometimes initialised to "Hot Music Values" in radio and television commercials in the 1990s.

In 1991, EMI opened HMV Canada's flagship shop at 333 Yonge Street in Toronto. The flagship shop hosted in-store concerts from Puff Daddy, D'Angelo, Green Day, Foxy Brown, Ramones, Guns N' Roses, Backstreet Boys, and NSYNC. A concert hosted by the Red Hot Chili Peppers had the Yonge and Edward Street intersection closed off. The Yonge Street shop was also notable for promoting local indie music scene by giving unsigned bands prominent shelf space on the ground floor, as well as hosting in-store concerts and events with Toronto bands.

The retailer also occupied a two-level, 20,000 square foot shop in West Edmonton Mall which included an event stage (known as the Phase IV Stage) in front of the shop. The Phase IV Stage often hosted musical performances or autograph signings by artists who were making tour stops in Edmonton.

In June 2010, HMV Canada launched purehmv, a customer rewards program that offered shop discounts and exclusive items across music, film, and gaming in exchange for points gained in-store. Over 300,000 customers joined the program in its first four months.

In June 2011, HMV sold its Canadian operations for £2 million to Hilco Capital, a British firm specialising in retail restructuring.

In late 2011, HMV Canada announced closures of its Downtown Vancouver and Richmond Centre shops.

By 2012, HMV had 113 shops in Canada, down from 121 when it was sold by HMV Group. However, Hilco Capital opened several new shops, including one in Peter Pond Mall in Fort McMurray. In late 2012, Hilco Capital reported they were successful at restructuring HMV Canada, and that there were no plans to cease operations. As part of its strategy, HMV Canada focused on growing back-catalogue music and movies not found at discount rivals, while also carrying higher-margin merchandise like gifts, collectibles, clothing and headphones, while removing video games and technology hardware from sale.

By January 2017, the company had $39 million in debt, after running at a loss since 2014. Hilco Capital stated that financial difficulties, combined with decreasing sales, meant the current situation was not sustainable. On 27 January 2017, HUK 10 Ltd., the shell company owned by Hilco employee, business partner of Nick Williams, and owner of HMV UK, Paul McGowan sued HMV Canada in the Ontario Superior Court. They were successful, and Hilco Capital announced plans to close all HMV Canada locations by 30 April 2017. HMV Canada locations held clear-out sales of their remaining inventory. The flagship shop on Yonge Street in Toronto closed on 14 April 2017.

In February 2017, Ontario-based chain Sunrise Records bought the leases of 70 of HMV Canada locations in an effort to convert into Sunrise Records locations, and invited 1,340 former HMV Canada employees to apply for 700 positions. HMV Canada's flagship location on Yonge Street in Toronto was one of the several locations that were not part of the deal, and remained vacant. Its head office was located in Etobicoke.

On 5 February 2019, Sunrise Records subsequently announced its intent to buy HMV UK out of administration from Hilco Capital for an undisclosed amount, with the possibility of HMV Canada's revival being considered.

In February 2024, Toys "R" Us Canada (also owned by Sunrise Records owner Doug Putman) announced that it would begin to introduce HMV-branded store-within-a-store departments at its locations, carrying music, home video, and various pop-culture collectibles. The retailer also returned to online trading. In February 2026, Toys "R" Us Canada filed for creditor protection after engaging in over $120 million of debt, with a significant number of stores closed. As of September 2026, there are only four Toys "R" Us locations remaining, all of which feature HMV concessions.

=== Ireland (1986–2016, 2023–present) ===
HMV established its first shop in Ireland in 1986 following the retailer's expansion to Canada. The first shop to open was on Grafton Street which became very popular for numerous big name Irish acts performing live in the shop. The retailer expanded in Dublin with a second shop on Henry Street and that followed with expansion into Cork in the late 1980s before adding a shop in Limerick City in the 1990s. The retailer expanded with numerous shops in the Greater Dublin region and nationwide again into Galway and Newbridge in the early to mid 2000s.

On 5 February 2011 HMV Ireland announced that its profits had fallen by almost 90% to €465,000, compared to €4.1 million the previous year.

On 16 January 2013, HMV Ireland declared receivership which required the company under Irish law to close all its shops immediately.

In April 2013, Hilco also stated that it hoped to reopen a HMV shop in Ireland following the closure of all shops in the country. Later, on 9 June 2013, it was confirmed that Hilco Capital Ireland had purchased HMV Ireland, and would reopen five shops within six weeks.

In January 2016, HMV Ireland confirmed the closure of its Galway City shop, and its shop on Dublin's Grafton Street, with both to close by the end of that month. This followed the closure of many Xtravision and HMV Xtravision branded outlets at the end of December 2015/early January. In late January 2016, the remainder of Xtravision was liquidated.

In July 2016, Hilco announced it would be closing its five remaining Irish shops, in order to refocus HMV in Ireland as a new digital service (HMV Digital) where customers can stream, rent or purchase music and films online. The new HMV digital service was to launch in Ireland before rolling out into the UK and Canada. However, HMV failed to successfully launch its new digital service in Ireland. All shops closed between 29 and 30 August 2016.

In June 2023, it was announced that HMV would return to Ireland, with a shop in Dublin. In May 2025, a shop opened in Limerick Crescent Shopping Centre.124 In October 2025, it was announced that HMV was to open a shop in Cork. HMV opened its second store in Dublin on 4 September 2026 in Swords Pavilions.

=== Netherlands (2025–present) ===
In November 2025, Sunrise Records opened the first HMV in the Netherlands.

=== Japan (1990–present) ===
In 1990, EMI established HMV Japan. Since JVC Kenwood Holdings (through its JVC and Victor Entertainment subsidiaries) controls the "His Master's Voice" trademark in Japan following a break-up from RCA Records, HMV Japan uses a stylised gramophone of its own design as its trademark. As with the former U.S. and Canadian operations, HMV Japan's use of the initials "HMV" has never been challenged.

In July 2007, HMV Japan, which operated 62 shops at the time, was sold to DSM Investment Catorce. The brand, shops and website would continue to trade as HMV, but would no longer be owned by HMV Group.

On 28 October 2010 the Japanese convenience store giant Lawson acquired all shares of HMV Japan from Daiwa Securities SMBCPI for ¥ 1.8 billion. KK HMV Japan became a part of Lawson and was renamed KK Lawson HMV Entertainment (株式会社 ローソンHMVエンタテイメント) on 1 December in the same year. Terms of the deal were published on official websites.

As well as "HMV & Books" at some locations, Lawson Entertainment also brands the store using "HMV Record Shop" and "HMV Museum". The tagline for HMV Japan is "the music & movie master".

== Defunct international operations ==
=== Australia (1989–2010) ===
In 1989, HMV established its first Australian shop in the Sydney suburb of Parramatta, closely followed by a second in Chatswood in the same year. In 1990, HMV opened its flagship shop in the Sydney central business district. The 1,207-square-metre superstore in Pitt Street Mall was the largest music shop in the Southern Hemisphere and sold more CDs than any other shop in the country. It was also awarded the ARIA Charts Store of the Year on three occasions. By 1998, a further 27 shops were opened in key retail centres on the eastern seaboard of Australia, including other large units at Melbourne's Bourke Street Mall and Brisbane's 585-square-meter Queen Street Mall shop.

In March 2000, HMV made local headlines when its larger rival, Sanity, signed a five-year deal with Festival Mushroom Records for a three-year online exclusivity window on all tracks downloaded from that label at Sanity's website. Sanity's competitors and other online services were meant to be blocked from Festival Mushroom's catalogue for that period unless Sanity agreed to deal with them. Chaos.com and Leading Edge Music both made public threats to boycott Festival Mushroom's content, but HMV Australia (whose website did not offer downloading) followed through, removing all CDs from their Australian shops, adding they would do the same overseas. By the next week, Festival Mushroom backed down, stating Sanity would simply be the wholesaler of their digital downloads for the next three years, requiring them to make all products available to other retailers at the time of release.

In October 2005, Sanity's owner, Brazin Limited acquired the Australian operations of HMV for A$4 million (£1.7 million). The HMV Group's agreement with Brazin was to phase out the HMV brand in Australia by 2010. Immediately after this acquisition of HMV's 32 outlets, this put Brazin at its peak with its 74 Virgin Megastore and Virgin At Myer shops, in addition to Sanity's 215, and EzyDVD's 63 outlets around the country (not counting non-entertainment retail chains within Brazin, such as Bras N Things) and was by far Australia's largest entertainment retailer with close to 43% of the music retail market. However, most HMV shops in Australia had very high overhead costs due to their large footprints and expensive locations, thus most were gradually closed upon the end of rental leases. The remaining shops were re-branded to Sanity over the next five years. The horizontal merger was approved by the Australian Competition & Consumer Commission the same month, leaving Brazin to merge marketing and general operations within the one entertainment division. Also in October, Brazin launched its Pulse loyalty card after a year of testing in the market. It worked by giving the customer one point for every dollar spent across Brazin's shop network, receiving a $5 discount voucher or other offers once 100 points were reached.

By December 2006, HMV had shrunk to 22 outlets from its peak of 32 the year before.

At the end of August 2007, HMV's Australian flagship shop in Pitt Street Mall was closed, when the Mid City Centre shopping centre it was located in was closed for renovation, and the large Bourke Street Mall shop closed on 19 February 2008. By mid-2010, the last HMV shop was closed in Brisbane by Sanity, and the last re-branded HMV shop trading as Sanity closed at Indooroopilly Shopping Centre in December 2012.

Hilco Capital owns the HMV brand in Australia.

=== France (1990s) ===
In the 1990s, HMV attempted to launch in France, but faced severe competition from Fnac and Virgin Megastores, as well as hypermarkets. The few trial French shops only lasted around six months. Hilco Capital owns the HMV brand in France.

=== Germany (1990s–2000s) ===
As of April 1998, HMV traded in Germany as HMV Tonträger GmbH, with the business later closed in the 2000s. Hilco Capital owns the HMV brand in Germany.

=== Hong Kong and Singapore (1990s–2010s) ===
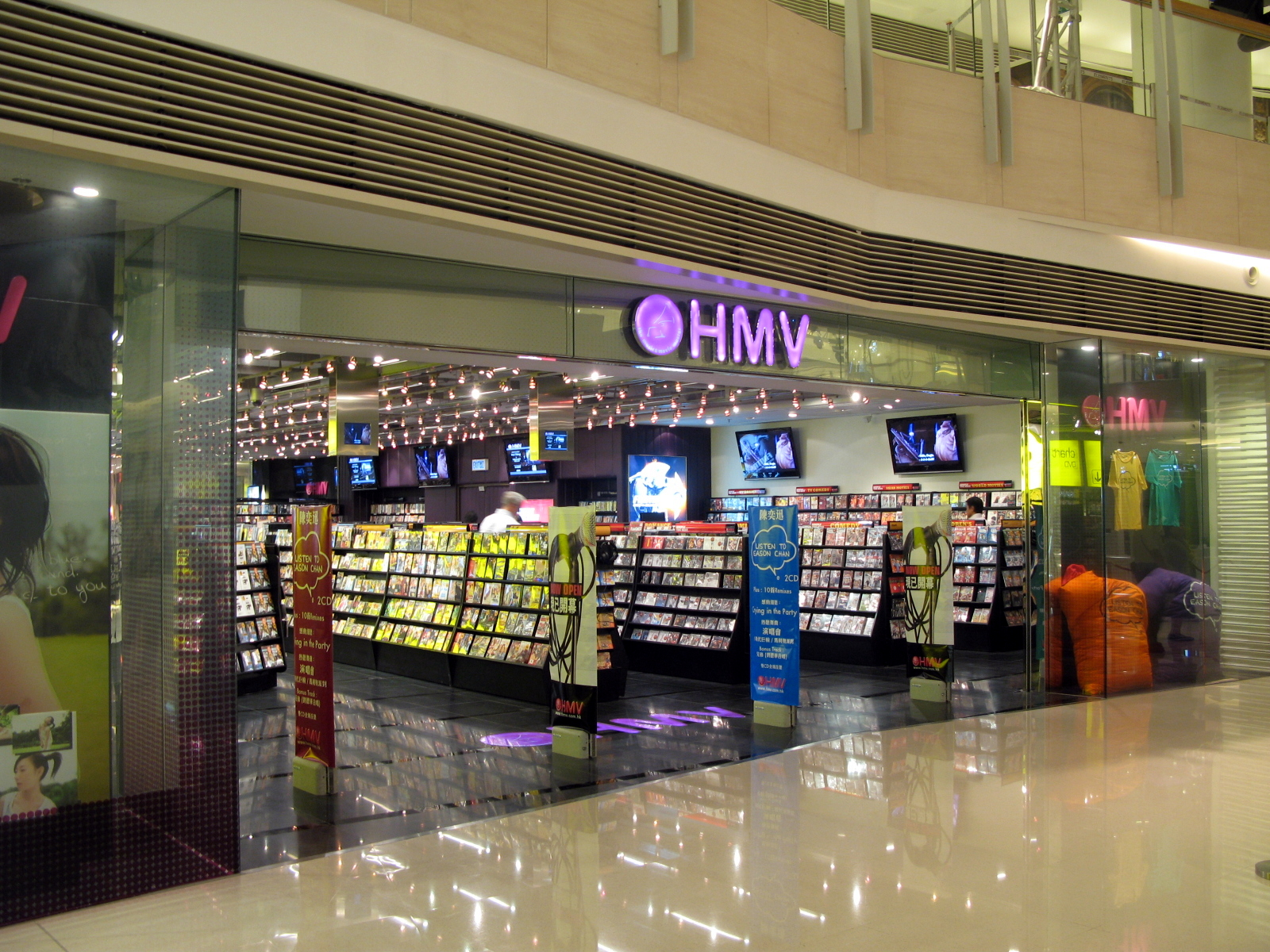
HMV shop in the Elements, Kowloon, Hong Kong, in 2007.

In 1994, HMV opened its first shop in Hong Kong at Windsor House, 311 Gloucester Road. Following this, HMV expanded into new shopping malls across the region. The Tsim Sha Tsui flagship shop, located at the corner of Peking Road and Hankow Road, was the largest record shop in the territory.

In Singapore, HMV was the second international music shop established after Tower Records, which eventually closed. HMV operated a shop at Marina Square, and previously had locations at 313@Somerset (which replaced a former shop at The Heeren) and the CityLink underground mall. HMV's pricing was generally higher than independent shops and local chains like Gramophone and That CD Shop, but it was the only retailer in Singapore to sell a variety of products, including games, T-shirts, books, and audio gear, alongside music and video.

In the 2000s, HMV Hong Kong partnered with Commercial Radio Hong Kong, renaming one of their channels HMV864 and broadcasting it in all HMV shops in the city. HMV Hong Kong was known for higher prices compared to independent record shops, particularly on non-promotional items. The Hong Kong shops were the second globally, after the UK, to introduce in-store digital kiosks, and the first in Asia. Initially, HMV Hong Kong used the same stylized gramophone logo as HMV Japan but later switched to the Nipper the Dog logo used by HMV UK, minus the gramophone.

On 28 February 2013, Deloitte announced that Hong Kong-based private equity firm AID Partners Capital Holdings had acquired HMV's businesses in Hong Kong and Singapore, as well as the rights to the HMV brand in China, Singapore and Taiwan. HMV's 313@Somerset shop in Singapore closed in November 2013, and the CityLink shop closed earlier.

In September 2015, HMV closed its last Singapore shop.

By 21 March 2016, China 3D Digital Entertainment Limited acquired HMV Hong Kong operations from AID Partners Capital Limited, later renamed to HMV Digital China Group Limited.

In December 2018, the Hong Kong operations, which included four shops and an HMV-themed restaurant, were closed.

As of May 2023, a company called HMV Brand Pte. Ltd. retains ownership of the defunct "HMV" and "His Master's Voice" brand across Hong Kong and Singapore, as well as various other Asian countries.

=== Qatar (2015–2022) ===
In July 2015, it was announced that HMV had struck a deal with the Qatar-based company, Al Mana Lifestyle, for fifteen shops across Qatar, Bahrain, Kuwait, Oman and the United Arab Emirates. There were also plans for Egypt, Algeria, Tunisia and Morocco. However, none of these plans came to fruition, and only one HMV shop in Qatar's Al Mirqab mall was opened, which later closed in 2022. The Al Mana Lifestyle Trading company retain the rights to the HMV brand across Qatar and Oman, whereas the rights to HMV in other Middle East regions, such as the United Arab Emirates, is owned by Palm Green Capital Limited.

=== United States (1990s–2004) ===
In the 1990s, the chain expanded into the United States, opening several shops along the East Coast, including a prominent flagship location in Manhattan. Similar to Canada, EMI in the U.S. did not have rights to use "His Master's Voice" or the Nipper dog mascot; as these trademarks were owned by RCA. Though, HMV in the U.S. was not prevented from using just the "HMV" initials by themselves.

HMV in the U.S. faced significant competition from rivals such as Tower Records, FYE and Virgin Megastores. The final shop in the United States, having lost £500,000 in 2003 and £1 million in 2004, closed on 3 November 2004.

From November 2004, HMV Canada maintained the defunct HMV trademark in the United States until it expired in November 2015.

== See also ==
- HMV's Poll of Polls
