= Buy Buy Baby =

American retailer

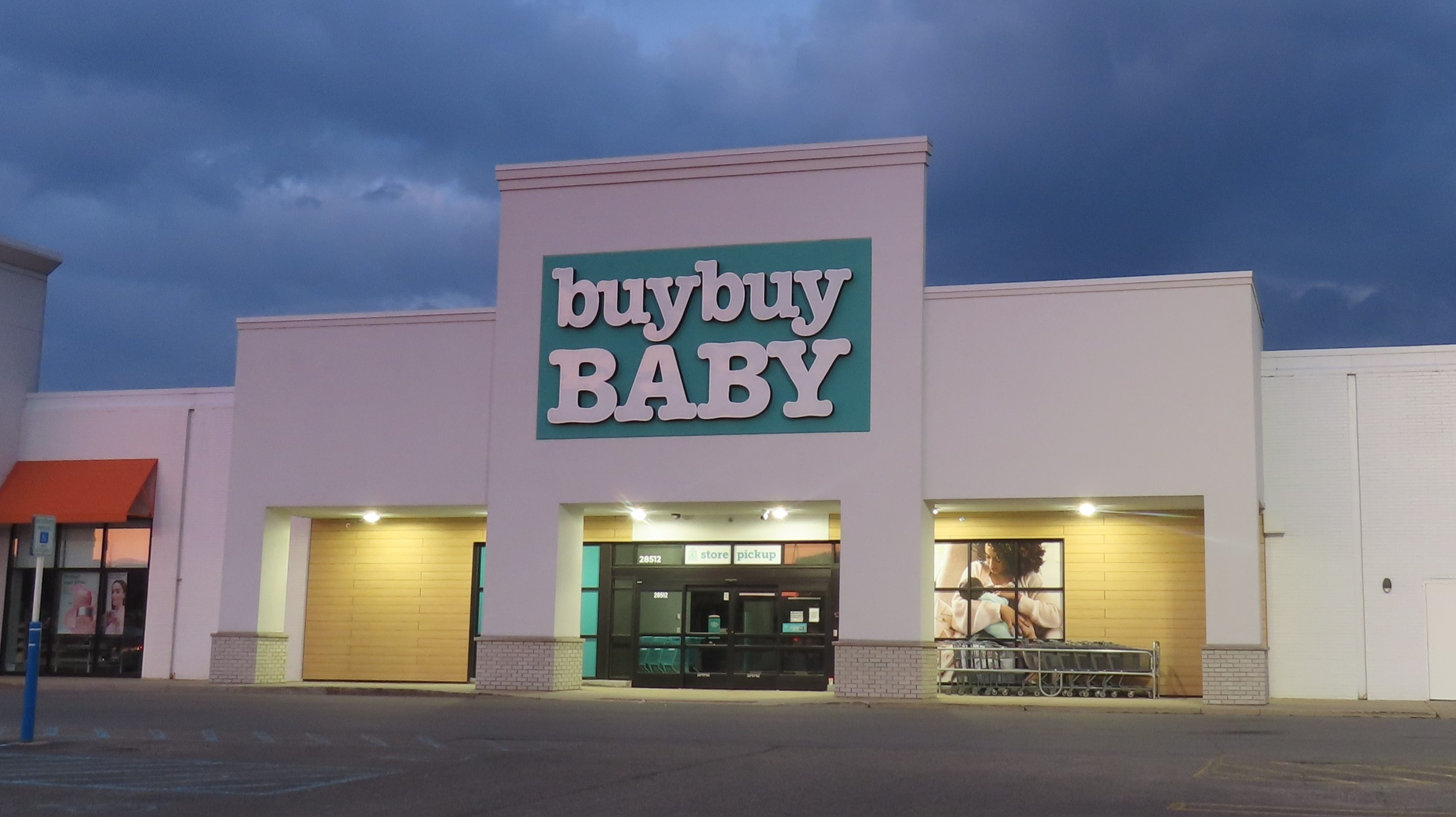
- Buy Buy Baby store in Southfield, Michigan
- Type: Subsidiary
- Industry: Retail
- Genre: Baby needs, toddler clothes
- Founded: 1996; 30 years ago
- Founders: Richard Feinstein; Jeffrey Feinstein
- Defunct: 2024; 2 years ago (stores only)
- Fate: Chapter 11 bankruptcy and liquidation
- Headquarters: U.S.
- Number of locations: 11 (November 2023)
- Area served: United States; Canada
- Products: Baby products
- Services: registry and photography plus online ordering
- Parent: Bed Bath & Beyond Inc. (2007–2023); Dream On Me (2023-2025); Beyond, Inc. (2025-present)
- Website: www.buybuybaby.com

Buy Buy Baby (stylized buybuy BABY) is an American big-box retail chain selling clothing, strollers, and other items for use with infants and young children. At its peak, it operated 137 stores across the United States. It was a subsidiary of Bed Bath & Beyond Inc., headquartered in Union, New Jersey, and closed all remaining stores following Bed Bath & Beyond's bankruptcy in 2023. However, Dream On Me bought 11 store leases via bankruptcy auction and has announced an intention to reopen stores by November 2023. The store is now distanced from Bed Bath & Beyond.

== History ==
Buy Buy Baby was founded in 1996 by Richard and Jeffrey Feinstein, sons of Bed Bath & Beyond co-founder Leonard Feinstein. The first location opened in Rockville, Maryland, in May 1996. The chain consisted of eight stores when it was acquired by Bed Bath & Beyond in 2007 for $67 million. Its primary competitor was Babies "R" Us, prior to that chain's closure in 2018.

=== Bankruptcy and liquidation ===
As its parent, Bed Bath and Beyond experienced financial distress in the early 2020s; Buy Buy Baby was initially largely unaffected. However, in January 2023, Buy Buy Baby announced the closure of five Buy Buy Baby locations, alongside the liquidation of sister chain Harmon Face Values. The following month, Bed Bath & Beyond announced Buy Buy Baby's withdrawal from Canada; all eleven Buy Buy Baby stores in Canada were closed by that April 2023.

On April 23, 2023, Bed Bath & Beyond officially filed for Chapter 11 bankruptcy protection in the United States, and announced that it would be winding down its operations. All remaining Buy Buy Baby stores began liquidation sales on April 27, 2023 with the last stores closing on July 30, 2023.

=== First revival ===
Efforts to sell the chain continued until July 2023, with no adequate bids submitted. In June 2023, a $15.5 million sale of the chain's name and intellectual property to New Jersey–based Dream On Me was confirmed. Dream on Me also bought the leases to 11 Buy Buy Baby stores, which it plans to reopen, followed by up to 120 stores within three years.

On October 25, 2023, Buy Buy Baby announced that they would be reopening select previously shuttered locations. Eleven locations opened by November 18 2023. The Buy Buy Baby website reopened by the end of that month. Over 100+ more stores were set to open over the next three years.

On October 18, 2024, Buy Buy Baby announced that it would close all 11 locations as it planned to fully focus on its online operations. Stores began liquidation sales on October 18, 2024, with stores shuttering before the end of 2024.

=== Second revival under Beyond, Inc. ===
In February 2025, Beyond, Inc. purchased Buy Buy Baby's assets for $5 million, with plans to open new stores in the future.
