= One Kings Lane =

American home decor retailer

One Kings Lane is an American luxury home decor business that operates a furniture and home accessories sales website. It was founded by Alison Pincus and Susan Feldman in March 2009. The company was valued at $912 million in 2014. The company has 10 million members and has raised over $200 million in venture capital from Mousse Partners, Kleiner Perkins, Greylock Partners, Institutional Venture Partners, and Tiger Global.

In 2016, One Kings Lane was acquired by Bed Bath & Beyond for approximately $12 million. Under its new parent, the company opened its first retail store, in Southampton, New York, in 2017. Two other retail locations followed: a flagship store in SoHo, Manhattan (2018), and another in Boston (2019). The company was sold to CSC Generation in 2020.

On April 23, 2023, Bed Bath & Beyond, One Kings Lane's former parent company, filed for Chapter 11 bankruptcy protection. However, despite its sale from the company three years prior to the bankruptcy, One Kings Lane was one of the affiliates listed in the Chapter 11 filing.
