= Bed Bath & Beyond (1987–2023) =

Defunct American houseware big-box retailer

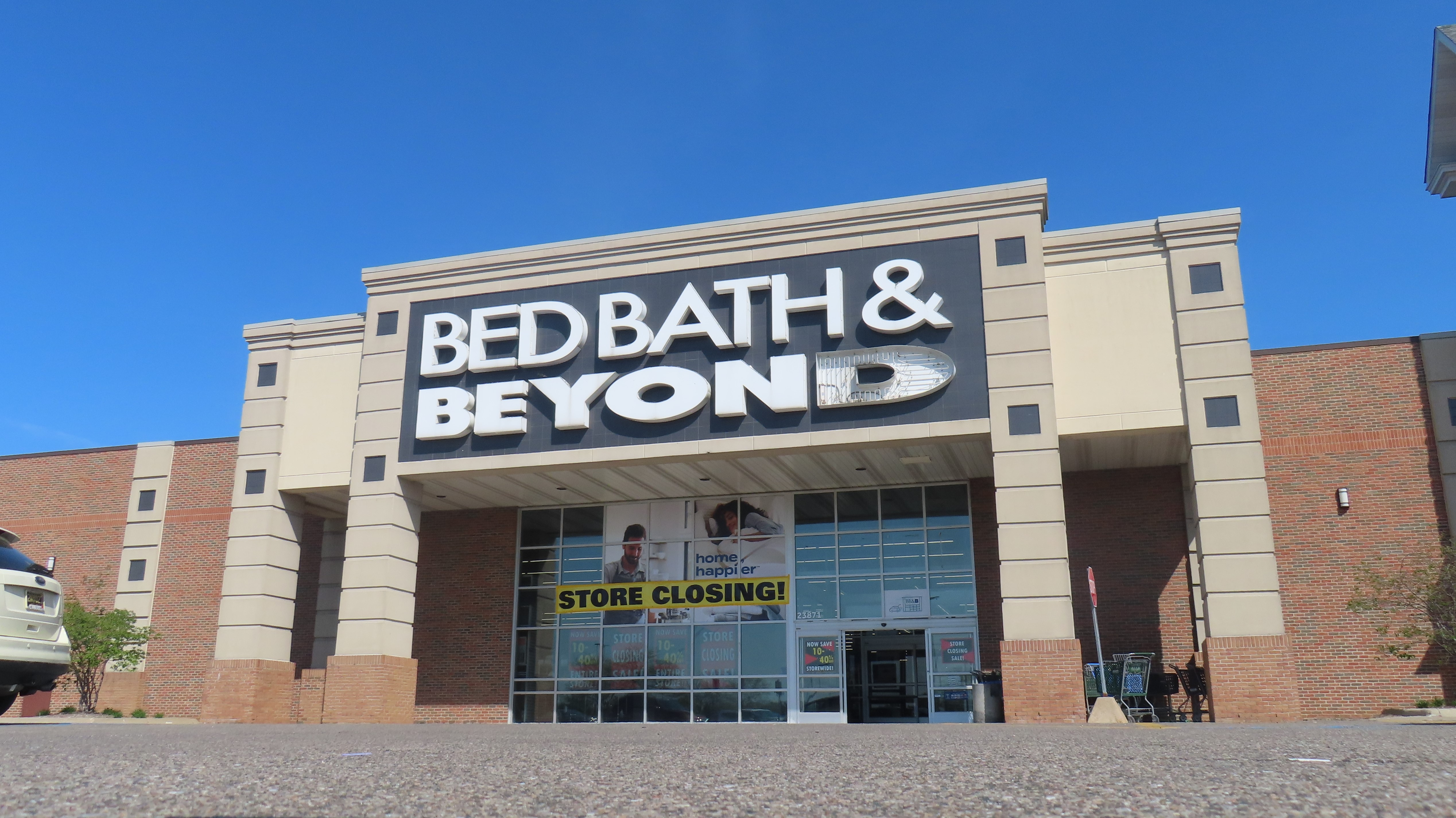
- Bed Bath & Beyond store in Taylor, Michigan, during liquidation in 2023
- Formerly: Bed 'n Bath (1971–1987); Bed Bath & Beyond, Inc. (1987–2023)
- Type: Public
- Traded as: Expert Market: BBBYQ; OTC Pink Limited: BBBYQ; OTC Pink Current: BBBYQ; Nasdaq: BBBY
- Industry: Retail
- Founded: 1971; 55 years ago Springfield, New Jersey, U.S.
- Founders: Warren Eisenberg; Leonard Feinstein
- Defunct: July 30, 2023; 3 years ago (original company)
- Fate: Chapter 11 bankruptcy; Liquidation; Intellectual property acquired by Overstock.com
- Successor: Beyond, Inc.
- Headquarters: Union, New Jersey, U.S.
- Number of locations: 187 (April 2023)
- Areas served: United States; Canada; Mexico; Puerto Rico
- Key people: Harriet Edelman (chairperson); Chandra Holt (CEO)
- Products: Housewares
- Number of employees: 14,000 (April 24, 2023)
- Subsidiaries: Buy Buy Baby (2007–2023); Harmon Face Values (2002–2023); World Market (2012–2021); Christmas Tree Shops (2003–2020)
- Website: bedbathandbeyond.com
- Footnotes; Financials as of February 26, 2022.

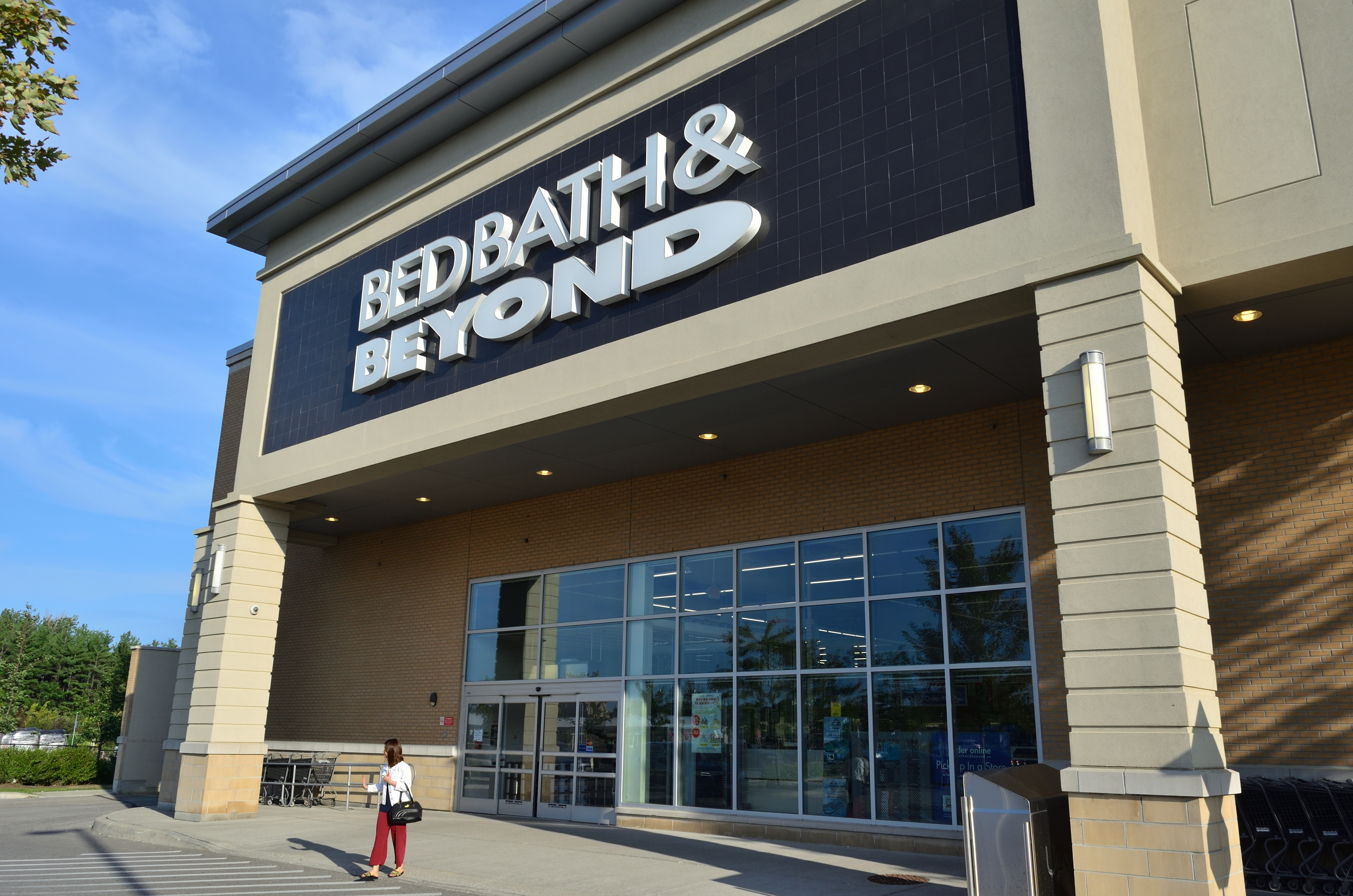
Bed Bath & Beyond in Markham, Ontario, 2018. This location was among the last in Canada, closing in April 2023.

Bed Bath & Beyond was an American big-box retail chain specializing in housewares, furniture, and specialty items. Headquartered in Union, New Jersey, the chain originally operated stores in the United States and Canada, and was once counted among the Fortune 500 and the Forbes Global 2000. The chain filed for Chapter 11 bankruptcy in April 2023 and liquidated all of its remaining stores, with the last closing on July 30, 2023. Following the retail chain's liquidation, its name was adopted by online retailer Overstock.com, which acquired Bed Bath and Beyond's trademarks in a bankruptcy auction. The name is also still used by the chain's former Mexican division, which is now independent.

== Retail history ==
Warren Eisenberg and Leonard Feinstein worked in management positions at discount store chain Arlan's. As the company suffered financial difficulties, and the two believed that the market would shift toward specialty stores, they decided to leave and form their own company. In 1971, they opened a store in Springfield, New Jersey, called Bed 'n Bath. By 1985, Eisenberg and Feinstein were operating 18 stores in the New York metropolitan area and California. Also in 1985, the first superstore was opened, as an attempt to remain competitive with Linens 'n Things, Pacific Linen, and Luxury Linens. In order to properly represent the size increase in its retail stores, the company changed its name to Bed Bath & Beyond in 1987.

=== Growth and acquisitions ===
By 1991, Bed Bath & Beyond had opened seven new superstores in New Jersey, California, Virginia, Illinois, Maryland, and Florida. The following June, the company made its IPO on the NASDAQ stock exchange. The company adopted integrated computer-based inventory management systems in 1993 to better compete with Linens 'n Things, which had utilized computer inventory management since the late 1980s. The chain's 100th store opened in Irvine, California, in October 1996; the 200th, in Palm Beach Gardens, Florida, followed less than three years later in August 1999. That year, Bed Bath & Beyond reached $1 billion in sales for the first time.

In 2002, Bed Bath & Beyond acquired Harmon Discount Health & Beauty, later renamed Harmon Face Values. Five years later in 2007, Bed Bath and Beyond acquired Buy Buy Baby, a chain of baby supply stores founded by Feinstein's sons, and began international expansion, opening their first Canadian store in Richmond Hill, Ontario. By 2011, Bed Bath & Beyond had 1,142 stores. In 2012, Bed Bath and Beyond acquired Cost Plus World Market for $495 million.

In 2016, Bed Bath and Beyond acquired One Kings Lane, a luxury furniture e-commerce retailer; the following year, Bed Bath and Beyond acquired Decorist, an online interior design platform.

=== Decline ===
In March 2019, three activist investment firms—Legion Partners, Macellum Advisors, and Ancora Advisors—announced their intent to remove current CEO Steven Temares and restructure Bed Bath & Beyond's current board of directors. The activist investors highlighted several instances of perceived nepotism, including the acquisition of Buy Buy Baby, which was founded by two of Bed Bath & Beyond co-founder Leonard Feinstein's children, and the acquisition of Chef Central, which was created by co-founder Warren Eisenberg's son, as examples of poor business practices at Bed Bath & Beyond. This pressure led five independent directors to step down on April 22, 2019, and also resulted in the company restructuring its board to include only 10 directors instead of the previous 12 members.

On April 13, 2019, there was a report that the chain would close 40 stores but open 15 new locations.

On May 13, 2019, Bed Bath & Beyond announced that CEO Steven Temares would step down "effectively immediately" and would resign his seat on the board of directors. Mary Winston, who had been appointed to the company's board as a result of the activist investment firms' efforts, replaced Temares as interim CEO. On November 4, 2019, Mark Tritton, previously chief merchandising officer at Target, started as Bed Bath & Beyond's CEO.

To combat declining profitability, Bed Bath & Beyond, which had for decades used coupon mailers and other promotional discounting tactics to attract consumers, announced in April 2019 that it would reduce its use of promotional coupons and tighten restrictions on their use. The chain also announced the development of new private label brands and concept stores.

As of 2019, Bed Bath & Beyond operated approximately 1,530 stores in all 50 U.S. states, as well as in the District of Columbia, Puerto Rico, and Canada. In addition, the company also operated approximately 280 Cost Plus World Markets, 100 Buy Buy Baby stores, roughly 80 Christmas Tree Shops, and more than 50 Harmon stores.

Bed Bath & Beyond announced in January 2021 that it would stop selling MyPillow, citing poor sales. The announcement came in the wake of the January 6 United States Capitol attack, that CEO Mike Lindell supported conspiracy theories and efforts to overturn the 2020 presidential election, and amidst similar announcements by Kohl's and Wayfair.

==== Divestitures ====
Throughout 2020, Bed Bath & Beyond sold many of its subsidiaries. First, in April, One Kings Lane was sold to CSC Generation. Later that year in October, the company announced plans to sell the 80-store Christmas Tree Shops chain, along with its Massachusetts distribution center, to Massachusetts-based Handil Holdings LLC; the acquisition was finalized the following month. Finally, in December 2020, the company also announced plans to sell Cost Plus World Market to Front Burner LP; that sale was later finalized in February 2021.

Bed Bath & Beyond announced in July 2020 that it planned to close more than 200 stores, about 21% of its fleet, over two years, citing the COVID-19 pandemic. 63 locations targeted for closure were named that September, followed by another 43 in January 2021. In January 2022, Bed Bath & Beyond announced the closure of 37 more locations.

In March 2022, Ryan Cohen, former CEO of Chewy and a large shareholder of Bed Bath & Beyond, sent an open letter, as part of a Schedule 13D filing, to the Board of Directors calling for Buy Buy Baby to be sold or spun off at a favorable valuation. Subsequently, Bed Bath & Beyond reached a deal to give Cohen three board seats in exchange for his cooperation and the creation of a committee to execute his proposed plan. In July 2022, FCM BBBY Holdings, LLC, managed by Jake Freeman, also sent an open letter, as part of a Schedule 13G filing, asking the board of directors to consider their proposed plan to reduce Bed Bath & Beyond's debt and improve liquidity through convertible bond issuance.

In July 2022, significant changes to the company's executive leadership were announced: Mark Tritton would leave his role as president and chief executive officer, to be replaced by Sue Gove in an interim capacity. That August, the company announced that 20% of its corporate staff would be laid off, and 150 more stores would be closed. Gove was promoted to permanent president and CEO the following October.

On September 2, 2022, Gustavo Arnal, the company's chief financial officer, died by suicide by jumping from the balcony of his New York City apartment. Arnal was one of the targets of a class action lawsuit alleging that Bed Bath & Beyond's stock had become a pump-and-dump scheme. Two weeks later on September 16, the company named 56 stores targeted for closure of the 150 announced in August; later, on September 26, the company announced the closure of Decorist.

=== Bankruptcy and liquidation ===
Bed Bath & Beyond opened in 2023 by warning investors that it might not survive the year. On January 5, 2023, shares of Bed Bath & Beyond plunged almost 30% on the stock market, and Bed Bath and Beyond announced it had "substantial doubt" in being able to continue to operate as a business. Wall Street analysts predicted that Bed Bath and Beyond could file for Chapter 11 bankruptcy as soon as January 7, 2023 On January 9, 2023, Bed Bath & Beyond hired AlixPartners as a restructuring adviser, and announced the closure of 62 more stores.

Bed Bath & Beyond announced on January 26, 2023, that some banks had cut its line of credit. The next day, it was revealed that Bed Bath and Beyond would shutter its Harmon Face Values chain, closing all 52 of its stores, and would also close five Buy Buy Baby stores and 87 Bed Bath & Beyond locations, including the last location in West Virginia.

On February 7, 2023, Hudson Bay Capital Management and several other investors arranged a death spiral financing deal to raise over $1 billion to help the company avoid bankruptcy, though most analysts at the time identified that such a deal would merely turn a possible Chapter 7 bankruptcy into a Chapter 11 bankruptcy.

On February 10, 2023, it was revealed the company would shutter its Canadian division, closing all 54 Bed Bath & Beyond and 11 Buy Buy Baby stores in Canada. According to court documents, the business does not have the "capacity or ability to independently effect a recapitalization or restructuring of the Canadian operations without access to cash and the support". The same day, they also announced 149 more store closures in the United States, including the last two locations in Wyoming.

Bed Bath & Beyond announced on March 30, 2023, that if it was unable to sell $300 million in stock, Bed Bath and Beyond would likely file for bankruptcy. In addition it also terminated its fundraising with Hudson Bay Capital Management but would go on to sue the hedge fund to recover trading profits from the deal.

On April 23, 2023, after failing to pay off stock, declining sales, high debt, and years of struggling, Bed Bath & Beyond, Buy Buy Baby, and 73 affiliated debtors and entities filed for Chapter 11 bankruptcy protection in the United States District Court for the District of New Jersey. It was later confirmed that all remaining Bed Bath & Beyond and Buy Buy Baby stores in the United States would close unless a buyer was found for the chain. Even if the company could find a buyer, shareholders could be expected to be wiped out, with proceeds from the liquidation going to secured creditors and bondholders. By May 3, 2023, Bed Bath and Beyond's stock was delisted from the Nasdaq exchange.

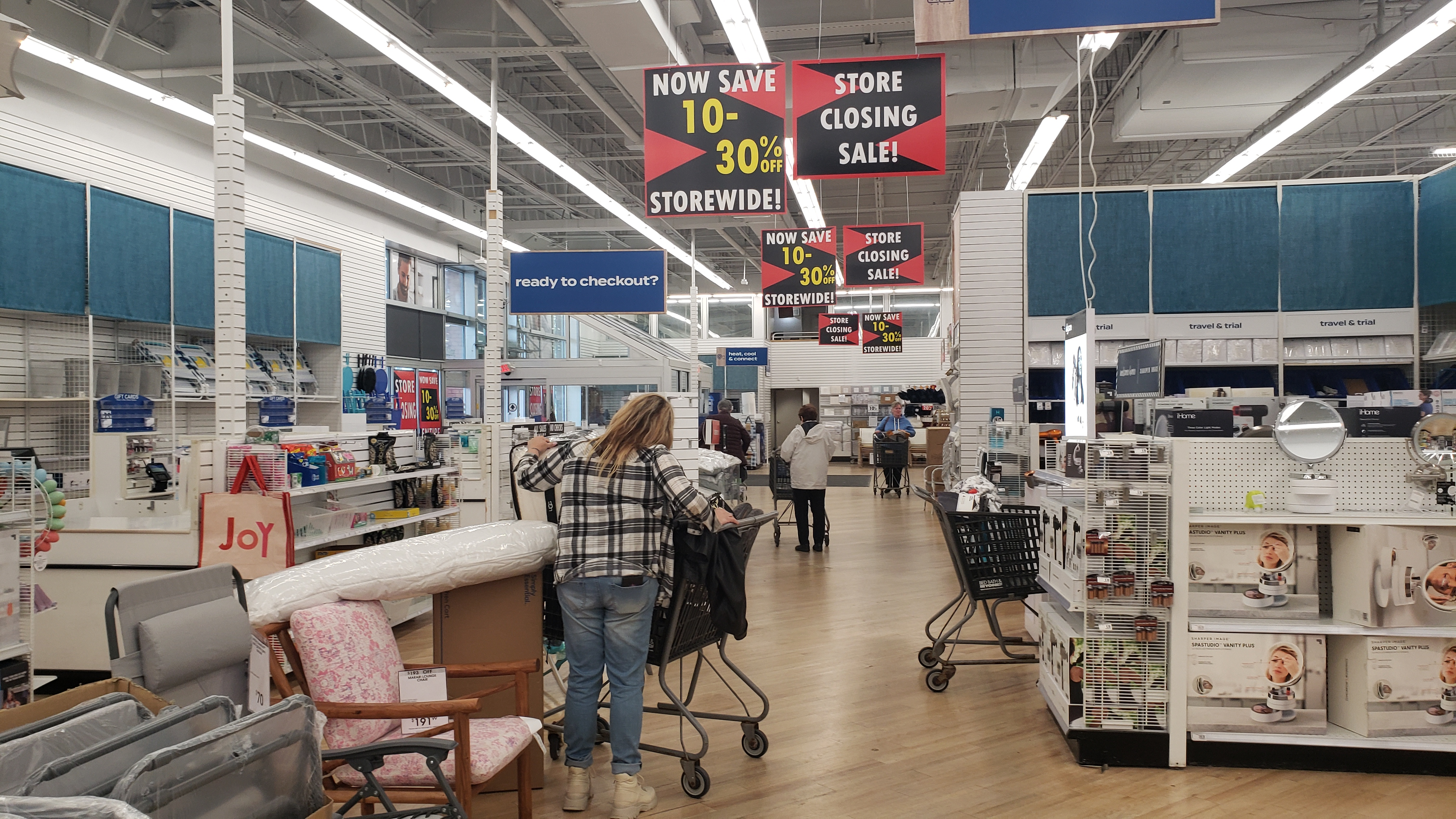
Bed Bath & Beyond store in Roseville, Michigan, during liquidation

Following the bankruptcy filing, Bed Bath & Beyond stopped accepting their popular coupons on April 26, 2023, and liquidation sales commenced at all remaining stores the next day. Shortly thereafter, numerous other retailers, including The Container Store, Big Lots, Boscov's, and Kirkland's, announced that they would honor unused Bed Bath & Beyond coupons for a limited time. Liquidation sales continued through June 2023 and July 2023, with the last stores closing permanently on July 30, 2023.

Industry analysts attribute Bed Bath & Beyond's failure to a number of factors, including a late entry to e-commerce, reduction in merchandise selection and quality, supply chain issues, competition from Walmart, Target, and HomeGoods, and debt accrued from stock buybacks. The latter is widely considered the largest reason for Bed Bath & Beyond's collapse, as the company's stock buyback schemes, in practice since 2004, were the source of much of its $5.2 billion debt. This resulted in an inability to pay vendors on time, which led many to halt merchandise shipments to Bed Bath and Beyond.

==== Acquisition by Overstock.com and online revival ====
In a June 2023 bankruptcy auction, Overstock.com acquired the Bed Bath & Beyond name, and associated intellectual property, in a $21.5 million stalking-horse bid. Shortly thereafter, Overstock publicly announced its intention to rebrand its own operations under the Bed Bath & Beyond name after the acquisition closes. It did so on August 1, 2023, two days after the last brick-and-mortar Bed Bath & Beyond stores shuttered.

The acquisition did not include the now distant Buy Buy Baby brand, as bids were still being solicited for a separate sale of the chain until July; after no satisfactory bids were received, Buy Buy Baby's name and intellectual property were instead auctioned. Buy Buy Baby was eventually sold to New Jersey-based Dream on Me for $15.5 million, who had plans to reopen up to 120 stores over the next few years. However, all stores were closed by the end of 2024 to focus on online operations.

Following the sale of the brand to Overstock, Bed Bath & Beyond, Inc. changed its name to 20230930-DK-Butterfly-1, Inc. and cancelled its stock on September 29, 2023.

==== Revival of Canadian stores as Rooms + Spaces and Babies "R" Us ====
The retailer's last Canadian stores closed four days earlier than planned in late April 2023. Following the closure of the chain's operations in Canada, Doug Putman, owner of Sunrise Records and Toys "R" Us Canada, acquired 21 former Bed Bath & Beyond locations, with plans to revive the chain in Canada as Rooms + Spaces, under the leadership of former Bed Bath & Beyond Canada general manager Greg Dyer. Putman also opened the first two stand-alone Babies "R" Us locations in Canada, in Edmonton in former Buy Buy Baby locations. The first Rooms + Spaces and stand-alone Babies "R" Us locations opened in July 2023.

Most stores were closed after being open for only a few months, as the leases were defaulted. As of February 2024, only two Rooms + Spaces locations remained open (at West Edmonton Mall and Brantford.)

As of January 2025, all Rooms + Spaces locations are permanently closed, along with the website.

Leases for other locations in Canada were acquired by other retailers, including Mark's and Pro Hockey Life.

==== Revival of physical stores (2025–present) ====
In summer 2025, Sleep Country Canada purchased the Canadian and U.K. rights to the Bed Bath & Beyond name and logos and the domain names for several websites. It plans to relaunch the retailer in those countries in 2026, with physical stores and online.

== Former subsidiaries ==
- Bed Bath & Beyond Canada L.P. (2007–2023) – opened in 2007; operated 53 stores across 9 Canadian provinces; liquidated and closed in April 2023; brand relaunched in Canada by Overstock.ca alongside US relaunch in August 2023
- Bed Bath & Beyond México – a joint venture with Home & More, S.A. de C.V to operate stores in Mexico under the Bed Bath & Beyond name. The Mexican unit is not affected by the closure in the US and Canada and will continue to operate normally.
- Buy Buy Baby – founded by Richard and Jeffrey Feinstein; acquired in March 2007; closed with company in July 2023
- Harmon Face Values (2002–2023) – acquired in March 2002; closed in February 2023
- Cost Plus World Market (2012–2021) – acquired in May 2012; sold in February 2021
- Christmas Tree Shops (2003–2020) – acquired in 2003; sold in 2020; closed in August 2023
- One Kings Lane (2016–2020) – acquired in June 2016; sold in April 2020
- Linen Holdings (2012–2020) – acquired in June 2012; sold in October 2020
- Of a Kind (2015–2019) – acquired in August 2015; closed in October 2019
- Decorist (2017–2022) – acquired in 2017; closed in September 2022

== Further media ==
- Why Bed Bath & Beyond Is Facing Extinction (video). CNBC. August 1, 2019.
