= Harmon Discount =

Retail company

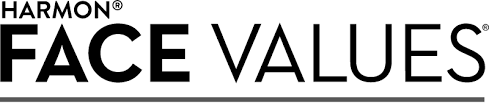
- Logo used from 2007 to 2023
- Formerly: Harmon Face Values, Harmon Discount Health & Beauty
- Type: Private
- Industry: Retail
- Founded: 1971; 55 years ago
- Defunct: 2023; 3 years ago (original company)
- Fate: Liquidation
- Headquarters: Union, New Jersey, United States
- Products: Cosmetics, beauty supplies, skin care, hair care, oral care, personal care, health, travel products, baby products, clothing solutions, household products, food and drink products, cleaning supplies, gifts
- Owner: Jonah Raskas (2023-present)
- Parent: Bed Bath & Beyond (2002–2023)
- Website: harmondiscount.com

Harmon Discount (previously Harmon Face Values and Harmon Discount Health & Beauty) is an American in-person and online retailer which specializes in health and beauty products. It was owned by Bed Bath & Beyond from 2002 until its liquidation in 2023 and is now being re-opened under new ownership.

Most of the chain's stores were located in the New York metropolitan area, though a few others were located in Florida, Nevada, and California. Its name was also used as a private label brand on products sold in Bed Bath & Beyond stores across the United States.

== History ==
Bed Bath & Beyond acquired the Harmon chain in March 2002. In April 2007, the chain was rebranded as Harmon Face Values.

On September 29, 2017, Bed Bath & Beyond experimented with a new store format called "Face Values & Beyond", a mix of a Bed Bath & Beyond store and a Harmon Face Values store. However, it closed in 2022.

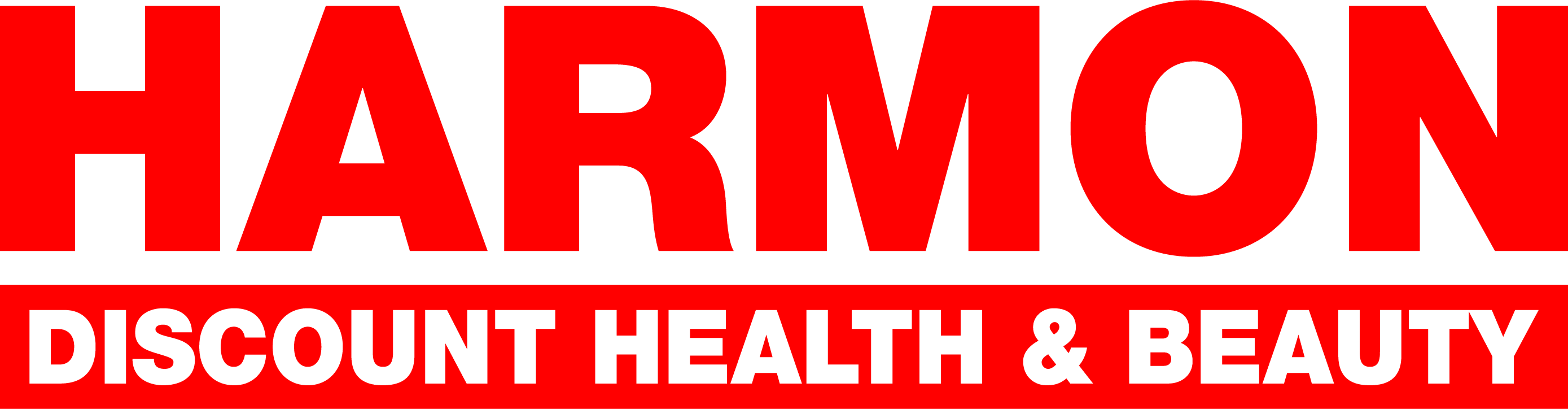
Previous Harmon logo, used prior to 2007 rebranding

On January 5, 2023, it was announced that Harmon's parent company, Bed Bath & Beyond, was in financial distress and considering the possibility of bankruptcy within the coming months. Later on January 27, Bed Bath & Beyond announced the liquidation and closure of all 52 Harmon stores. All remaining Harmon stores were closed by February 26, 2023. The following April, when Bed Bath & Beyond filed for Chapter 11 bankruptcy, Harmon was listed in the filing, despite shuttering before the bankruptcy occurred. Some old Harmon Face Values properties were sold to small private companies.

In 2023, the Harmon company and brand was bought by private investor Jonah Raskas. In 2024, he reopened its North Ridge Shopping Center location in New Rochelle, New York and online retail site under the name Harmon Discount. He planned to reopen at least five of its previously closed stores.
