= Toys "R" Us Canada =

Canadian toy store chain

Toys "R" Us

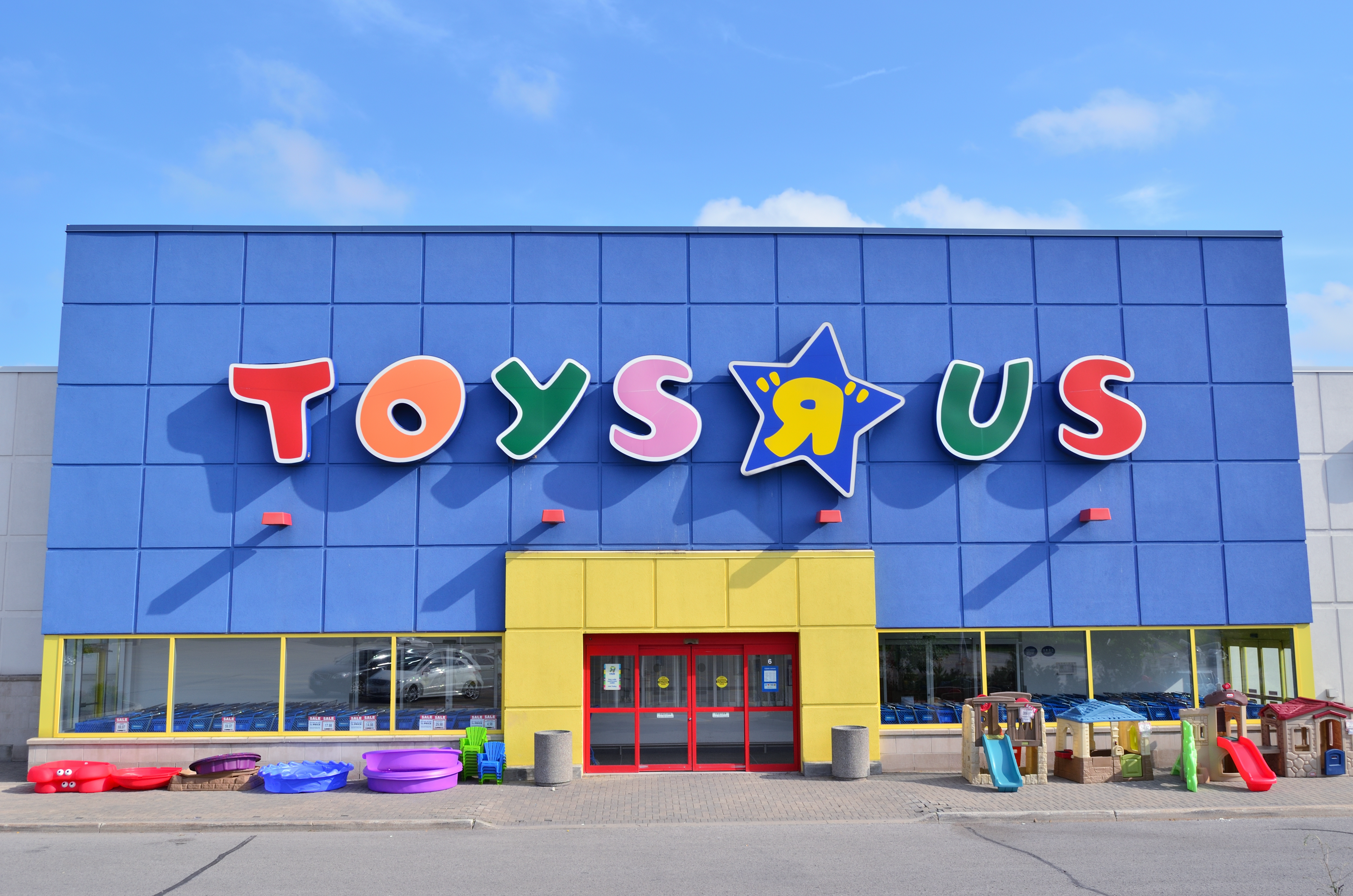
- A Toys "R" Us store in Richmond Hill, in 2018
- Trade name: Toys "R" Us Canada
- Type: Private
- Industry: Retail
- Founded: 1984; 42 years ago
- Headquarters: Concord (Vaughan), Ontario, Canada
- Number of locations: 4
- Products: Toys; Clothing; Baby products
- Owner: Next Century Ipco Can ULC (brand)
- Divisions: Babies "R" Us Canada (1996–present) Rooms + Spaces; (2023–2025); HMV Canada (2024–present); Parties "R" Us (pending)
- Website: toysrus.ca

Toys "R" Us is a retailer trading name in Canada, used by Putman Investments for big-box locations, and Staples Canada for in-store concessions. The Toys "R" Us brand name itself is owned by Next Century Ipco Can ULC.

The American Toys "R" Us retailer traded in Canada from 1984 until its bankruptcy in September 2017, after which the Canadian division's trademarks and 82 locations became independently owned by Fairfax Financial in May 2018, and then by Putman Investments in August 2021. The chain filed for Companies' Creditors Arrangement Act protection (CCAA) in February 2026, after closing a significant number of locations in the year prior. In August 2026, Next Century Ipco Can ULC acquired the legal rights to the Toys "R" Us brand from Putman Investments.

As of November 2026, the chain has 4 locations operated by Putman Investments: Hamilton, Sarnia, Sherway Gardens (Toronto) and South Park Centre (Edmonton). In November 2026, it was announced that Toys "R" Us would open at around 300 Staples Canada locations by the end of 2027 as a store-within-a-store concept.

== History ==
Toys "R" Us Canada first arrived in 1984 and had consisted of independent stores, seasonal businesses within department stores and one major toy-store chain, Toys & Wheels, which had later went defunct in 1995. These were massive destination stores that would carry everything in their particular niche category.

The first store was opened in Brampton, Ontario in 1978 followed by dozens of more. The stores were set up as massive, 50,000-square-foot, stand alone destination stores, such as the outlet that opened in 1990 on Lougheed Highway in Coquitlam.

In September 2017, Toys "R" Us filed for Chapter 11 bankruptcy protection, and closed all U.S. locations in June 2018. Toys "R" Us pursued a sale of the Canadian division, including the possibility of bundling them with top-performing U.S. stores. The Canadian unit had annual sales of $1.08 billion at the time of the filing, and had to file for protection from its creditors due to the default of its U.S.-based businesses.

Logo used from 2018 until 2020

Alternate logo used in Canada from 2018 until 2020 for promos and store signs

In April 2018, it was announced that Fairfax Financial would acquire the 82 Toys "R" Us locations in Canada for $300 million, with the stores continuing to use the Toys "R" Us name. A couple of months later, the first Canadian store to close was in Richmond Hill, Ontario. In 2021, Sunrise Records owner Doug Putman, through his Putman Investments, announced he would buy Toys "R" Us Canada (which now comprised 81 locations) from Fairfax Financial.

Logo used for stores in Quebec from 2020 until 2026

In January 2024, the chain announced that it would revive the HMV brand in Canada (which Putman had acquired via Sunrise in 2019) as a store-within-a-store concept at Toys "R" Us Canada locations, stocking music, home video, and memorabilia such as books and clothing. The departments began to launch at selected locations in the Greater Toronto Area, and were expected to be deployed at other locations throughout the year. Later in 2024, large quantities of overstock from the failed Rooms + Spaces chain was moved into Toys "R" Us Canada stores.

In October 2025, the chain announced it had suffered a major data breach.

=== Creditor lawsuits and mass store closures ===
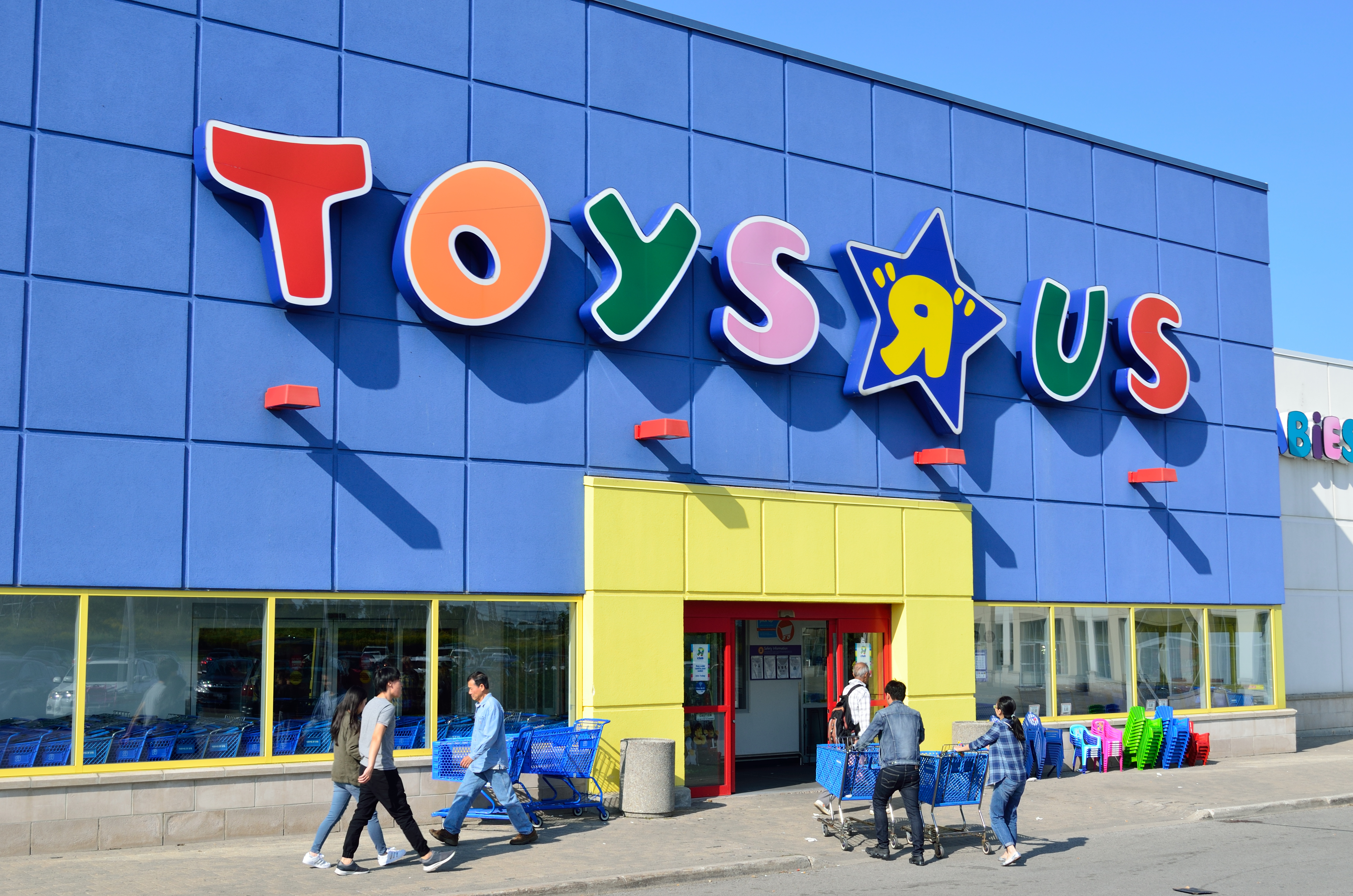
Another picture of the same Toys "R" Us store, but in 2017. Canada was among the earliest foreign markets that was targeted for international expansion.

On February 3, 2026, Toys "R" Us Canada filed for protection under the Companies' Creditors Arrangement Act (CCAA) with numerous creditors owed. All Toys "R" Us stores would remain open during the process. Toronto court records show several parties, including landlords and suppliers, have filed more than 20 lawsuits seeking $31.8 million (CAD) against the Canadian chain of toy stores over property, mortgage, contract and debt disagreements in the past two years. The claims have not been tested in court. Toys "R" Us owed at least $120 million to its vendors and $31.3 million in unpaid rent and other damages to landlords. Toys "R" Us within British Columbia shut down, with the chain’s last outlet at the Willowbrook Shopping Centre located in the Vancouver suburb of Langley closing its doors on January 15, 2026.

In March 2026, the chain applied for protection under the Companies' Creditors Arrangement Act (CCAA) with numerous creditors owed, alongside significant store closures occurring beforehand. It was announced that the chain is seeking permission from the court to be put up for sale.

By the end of May 2026, the locations in Toronto, Downtown Toronto, Scarborough, Saint-Bruno and Saskatoon had closed, marking the demise of Toys "R" Us in Quebec, and reducing the national number of locations to 16.

In June 2026, it was announced that owners would sell the Toys "R" Us Canada intellectual property to Ad Populum LLC, alongside Fox Group Jumbo Canada acquiring the Vaughan Mills location, and current owner Doug Putman rescuing 10 store leases alongside all remaining inventory and HMV Canada's intellectual property. This deal would exclude five remaining locations. Putman will operate ten locations as Toys "R" Us under license until at least January 2027, at which point the locations will either be rebranded, or Putman's rights to the Toys "R" Us license will be extended.

In July 2026, the Brampton store closed down, the first Toys "R" Us in Canada. It was reported in the same month that the Barrie, alongside the Polo Park and Regent locations in Winnipeg, would be closing.

In August 2026, the chain was reduced to 7 locations, following the closure of Barrie, Kildonan, Kitchener, Lethbridge and North Edmonton. The Whitby location was closed down on August 16th, reducing the chain to six locations. The Regina location closed down later in August, reducing to five locations. The Winnipeg (Polo Park) location closed on August 31, reducing to four locations.

=== Staples Canada license ===
In November 2026, it was announced that Staples Canada had signed a license with Toys "R" Us Canada to operate store-within-a-store concessions. Toys "R" Us Canada is expected to open its first location inside a Staples at Richmond Hill, Ontario on November 14. A new concept was also announced, Parties "R" Us, for the sale of party goods and seasonal essentials.
