= Fopp (retailer) =

British chain of retail shops

- Fopp logo
- Type: Subsidiary
- Industry: Retail; Record shop
- Founded: Glasgow, Scotland, UK; 1981
- Headquarters: London, England, UK
- Number of locations: 105 shops (at peak); 8 shops (2014–2019); 6 shops (2020–present)
- Area served: United Kingdom
- Key people: Gordon Montgomery, Founder
- Products: CDs, vinyl records, DVDs, books, café
- Owner: Sunrise Records (Note: Brand owned by Mermaid (Brands) Limited)
- Website: www.fopp.com

Fopp is a British chain of retail shops selling music, film, books and other entertainment products in the United Kingdom. The chain's stores are operated by Sunrise Records, but with the Fopp brand being used under license from Mermaid (Brands) Limited.

== History ==
=== Origins ===
The company was set up by Englishman Gordon Montgomery and began as a one-man stall in Glasgow, Scotland in 1981. The name "Fopp" comes from the title of a song by the Ohio Players on their 1975 album Honey.

By 2007, Fopp had expanded to become a chain of over 100 branches in the UK. With the demise of rival chain Music Zone, Fopp became the third largest specialist music retailer in the UK in terms of shop numbers (after HMV and Virgin Megastores).

=== Administration ===
Having taken over rival chain Music Zone following its fall into administration, Fopp found itself with cash flow problems. The company cancelled book deliveries in June blaming a change in location of warehouse from Bristol to Stockport (the old Music Zone warehouse).

On 21 June 2007, the company began accepting only cash transactions, stating card authorisation problems as the cause. On 22 June 2007 the company closed all branches for 'stocktaking' and said it was in talks with its bank. A week later the company announced a temporary closure in all its outlets and its online venture, and staff were informed that they would not be receiving their monthly pay.

On 29 June 2007, Fopp called in receivers after a last-ditch deal that would have allowed Sir Richard Branson a way to devolve himself from the loss making Virgin Megastores without the negative PR of closing down multiple locations, but this deal failed to win support from Virgin's main supplier. The shops were closed, and staff were sent home with their monthly salaries unpaid.

The Fopp website was taken down shortly afterwards and replaced with the following message:

"It is with great regret that we announce the closure of Fopp.

Our store chain is profitable, well regarded and loved by our loyal customers and staff. However we have failed to gain the necessary support from major stakeholders, suppliers and their credit insurers to generate sufficient working capital to run our expanding business.

We would like to thank staff and customers for their support over the past 25 years.

Any outstanding website orders have now been cancelled and will not be fulfilled or charged."

— Fopp closure announcement, 29 June 2007

Ernst & Young was appointed as joint administrator of Fopp and Music Zone, and issued a press statement detailing shops closed and the numbers of jobs lost at each location.

=== HMV ownership ===
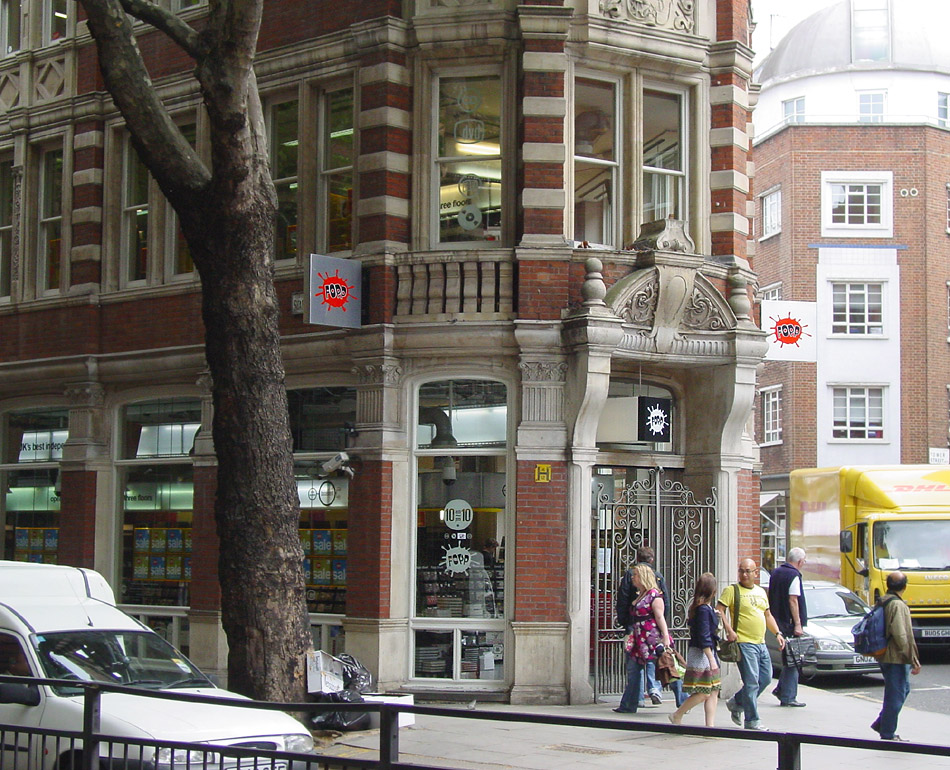
Fopp store in London

On 31 July 2007, it was announced that HMV would take control of the Fopp brand and its shops in Cambridge, Edinburgh Rose Street (but not Cockburn Street), Glasgow, London Covent Garden, Manchester and Nottingham. On 12 February 2008, Bristol Evening Post reported that a further shop would open in Bristol (in a former HMV-owned Waterstone's store), a city in which three Fopp shops had traded prior to summer 2007.

On 24 August 2007, the Glasgow Union Street and Edinburgh stores reopened. The Cambridge shop reopened on 25 August 2007, and the Manchester shop was relaunched on the 27th. After a statement from HMV stating that it was unable to open the Covent Garden London branch, it finally gained the landlord's consent to take over the lease and the shop reopened on 5 October 2007. Only around 10% of the original 700 employees kept their jobs.

It was also announced that the Leamington Spa shop would be reopening as Head, a separate shop from Fopp, but retaining Fopp's stock and assets. The Head shop opened on 1 November 2007 and employed some of its predecessor's former employees. The shop intends to host regular performances from local bands, and hopes to allow musicians, artists and authors from Leamington and its surrounding areas to sell their work there. This was initially a single shop, but has more recently expanded into a chain of four sites.

In 2009, the HMV shop in Exeter, Devon, was rebranded as a new Fopp shop while HMV moved to a new building in the redeveloped Princesshay Shopping Centre. Also in August 2010, HMV opened a new Fopp store on the ground floor of the Waterstone's store in Gower Street, London. On 30 January 2011, HMV closed the Fopp shop in Exeter due to poor sales in the recent reform of HMV. It was the first Fopp shop to close under the HMV banner. In January 2014, Fopp announced it would be closing the London Gower Street branch within Waterstone's on 18 January 2014, with the remaining business transferring to the Covent Garden branch.

At their peak under HMV ownership, nine shops were trading as Fopp.

On 15 January 2013 Fopp, along with its parent company HMV went into administration. HMV was bought out of administration by Hilco UK on 5 April 2013 saving Fopp's nine remaining shops.

On 28 December 2018, HMV confirmed it had again been placed into administration, which Hilco UK cited the "tsunami" of retail competition as the reason for the move. On 5 February 2019, Canadian record shop chain Sunrise Records announced its acquisition of HMV Retail Ltd. from Hilco UK for an undisclosed amount, but at the cost of closing 26 locations, including four Fopp shops, leaving only six shops trading under the name. In January 2020 the Byres Road shop in Glasgow closed leaving only five stores. However a store in Union Street in Glasgow means that Fopp again has six stores.

== Merchandising ==
The first Fopp shop was a market stall in Decourcey's Arcade near Byres Road in Glasgow opened 1981 by Gordon Montgomery. Fopp operated a "keep-it-simple" approach to the pricing of its merchandise, with most prices rounded to whole-pound figures. It built a reputation for reasonable prices on new releases, and competitive prices (often £5) on non-mainstream catalogue CDs, DVDs and books. The company also had a policy called "suck it and see", whereby any purchase could be returned to the shop within 28 days for a full refund as long as it was as new.

== Locations ==
As of 2020, Fopp has five shops across England and Scotland: London Covent Garden, Manchester, Cambridge, Edinburgh, and Glasgow Union Street. Until 2007 there were 50 Fopp shops and 37 outlets branded as Music Zone throughout England, Scotland and Wales. Fopp appeared in The Scotsman's list of the 250 Biggest Scottish Companies of 2005. In February 2019 it was announced that the shops in Oxford, Bristol, Manchester and Byres Road will close, however the store in Manchester reopened soon after, in May 2019.

In June 2024 the first new Fopp store to open in several years was launched in Nottingham: the new store is located on Bridlesmith Gate.
