= Sunrise Records =

Canadian record store chain

2428391 Ontario Inc.

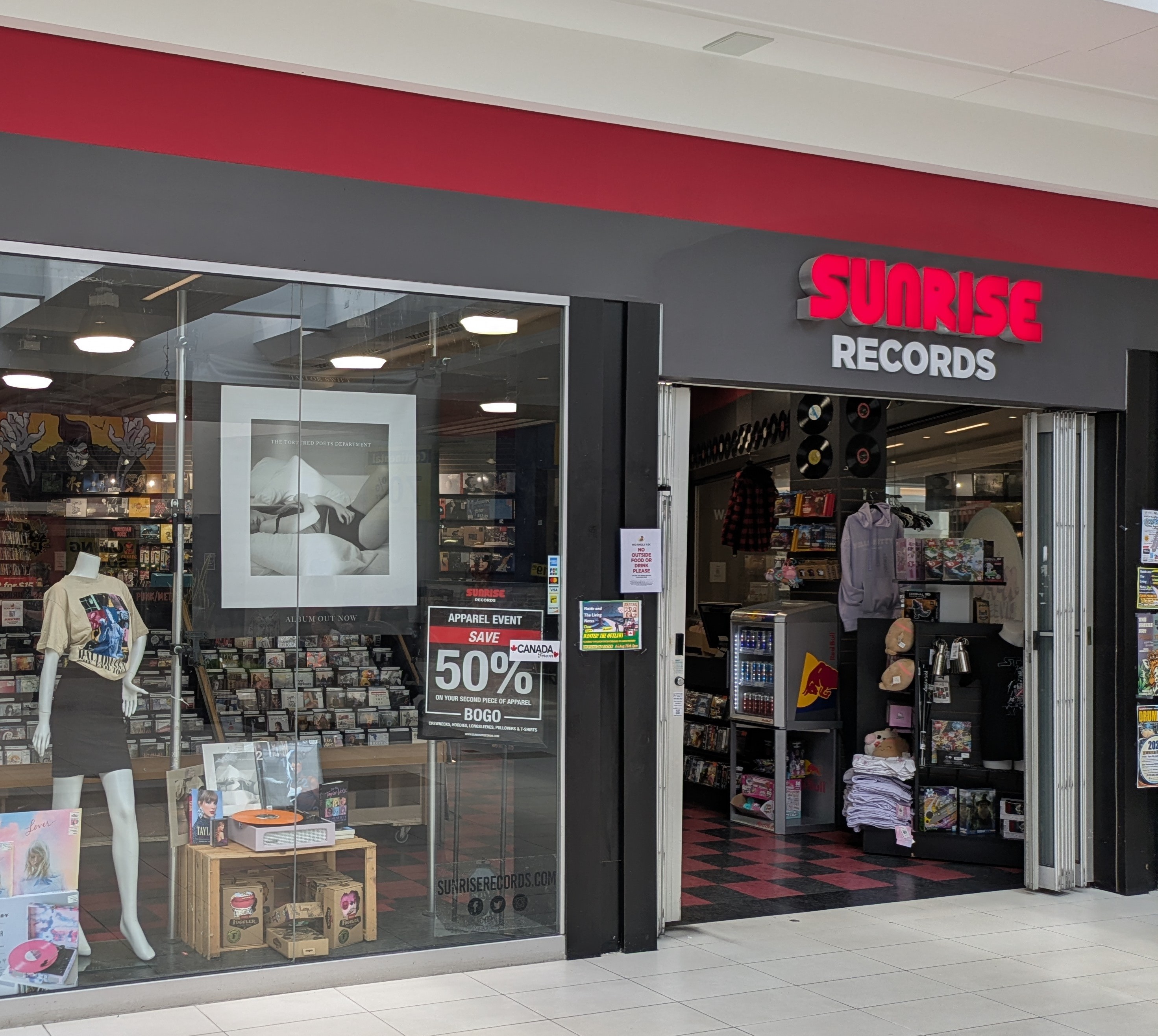
- A Sunrise Records store at White Oaks Mall in London, Ontario
- Type: Private
- Industry: Retail
- Founded: 1977; 49 years ago (Toronto, Ontario, Canada)
- Headquarters: Ancaster, Hamilton, Ontario, Canada
- Number of locations: 85
- Area served: Canada
- Products: Books; Film; Television; Music; Technology; Merchandise
- Parent: Putman Investments
- Subsidiaries: FYE (USA); HMV (Europe)
- Website: sunriserecords.com

Sunrise Records is a Canadian record store chain based in Hamilton, Ontario. Currently owned by Doug Putman, it currently operates in nine Canadian provinces and operates internationally under the FYE and HMV brands.

Originally operating with only nine locations in Ontario, the chain announced a major expansion in February 2017, under which it purchased leases for 70 locations across Canada that were formerly occupied by HMV. The chain runs approximately 85 locations nationwide.

In February 2019, the chain bought HMV in the United Kingdom; as well as returning HMV to Canada and Ireland, and entered the Belgian and Dutch markets. In January 2020, Sunrise Records purchased FYE in the United States.

== History ==
The company was founded in Toronto in 1977, with a location on Yonge Street. It was bought in 1978 by Malcolm and Roy Perlman. For a period, Sunrise was considered one of the five major record store chains in Canada, alongside HMV Canada, Music World, Sam the Record Man, and A&A Records. However, by the 2000s, with the shift towards online music stores and other factors (including the dominance of HMV), most of these smaller chains downsized or shut down. In 2014, Sunrise closed its flagship store in Toronto. In October 2014, the chain was acquired by Doug Putman. Under Putman, the chain opened new locations; it expanded to nine stores within Ontario.

In January 2017, HMV Canada entered receivership, and announced that it intended to close all stores by the end of April. On February 26, 2017, Sunrise Records announced that it had negotiated to purchase the leases for 70 of HMV's locations from landlords to convert them to Sunrise stores (including major locations such as the Square One Shopping Centre, Promenades Saint-Bruno. Polo Park, West Edmonton Mall, Midtown in Saskatoon, and Metropolis at Metrotown), while retaining as many former HMV employees as possible.

Putman felt that the bankruptcy of the chain was a major opportunity to expand the regional Sunrise chain into a national brand. He noted that record labels had become concerned by the closure of HMV because they would not have a prominent location to stock their physical product. The company's announcement quoted Universal Music Canada president Jeffrey Remedios, who felt that record stores were still important to fans and artists, and that they were "a community hub where passions are shared, art is explored, and lasting journeys begin." Putman added that "it is really sad to see HMV go. They were a great retailer and they really helped the physical business in Canada." Of the converted stores, Sunrise planned to stock a larger and broader array of music in comparison to HMV, including larger selections of vinyl records and music by local independent artists, as well as expanded offerings of music and entertainment apparel and merchandise. The new chain has been successful and profitable, with renewed interest in vinyl records having been cited as a factor in its performance (at least half a million vinyl LPs were sold by the chain in 2017).

On February 5, 2019, Sunrise announced that it had acquired HMV Retail Ltd.—the HMV chain's British parent company—from Hilco UK for an undisclosed amount (later revealed to be £883,000). The company had, for a second time, announced its intent to enter administration. Sunrise plans to maintain the chain's operations under the HMV and Fopp banners, and mirror its larger focus on pop culture merchandise and vinyl records. On the day the sale was announced, 27 locations (including its flagship Oxford Street store) were immediately closed. However, by late-February, five of the shuttered stores had re-opened, with at least four more to follow. Putman noted that it was "unlikely, but possible" that the HMV brand could theoretically be reintroduced to Canada; in January 2024, sister company Toys "R" Us Canada announced plans to relaunch HMV as a store-within-a-store concept, stocking a similar selection of music, home video, and collectibles.

In 2020, Sunrise announced the purchase of U.S. chain FYE from Trans World Entertainment.
