= Licorice Pizza (store) =

Defunct record store chain in California

- Founded: 1969
- Headquarters: 12230 Ventura Boulevard, Studio City, Los Angeles, California, United States of America
- Products: Records, Compact Discs, Cassette Tapes
- Website: https://www.licoricepizzarecords.com/

Licorice Pizza was a Los Angeles area record store chain. The name derives from a colloquial expression for vinyl records, comparing them to the color of licorice and the shape of a pizza. The store name inspired the title of Paul Thomas Anderson's 2021 film Licorice Pizza.

James (Jim) Greenwood, founder, opened the first Licorice Pizza record store in July 1969 in downtown Long Beach. In the next fifteen years, multiple locations spread throughout Southern California. They became known for knowledgeable staff, all-request in-store sound systems, getting new album releases first, Greenwood performing his own radio advertisements, and giving away free licorice. Greenwood recalls that the Licorice Pizza name was selected because he heard it to describe a record on the Bud & Travis... In Concert album and it sounded better than "Jim's Records." Matt Groening, creator of The Simpsons, worked at one on Sunset Boulevard in the early 1980s, where he first printed and sold his comic strip Life in Hell.

In 1985, Greenwood sold the company, which was ultimately absorbed into the massive national record store chain Musicland, and the Licorice Pizza name disappeared as it was rebranded as Sam Goody. The brand was largely dormant for decades, though rights to use the name on apparel had been secured by another company. The current owner, Kerry Brown bought those rights, then worked through the process of taking ownership of the trademark not just for a store, but for the record pressing business, and various categories of merchandise.
