= Tower Records =

International retail franchise and music store company

- Type: Music retailer
- Industry: Retail
- Founded: 1960 (as retail music chain); 1995 (as online retailer)
- Fate: Defunct, 2006–2020; Relaunched, 2020
- Headquarters: New York City, U.S.
- Products: DVDs, compact discs, videos, video games, records, posters, books, collectibles, accessories
- Website: towerrecords.com

Tower Records is an international retail franchise and online music store that was formerly based in Sacramento, California, United States. From 1960 until 2006, Tower operated retail stores in the United States, which closed when Tower Records filed for bankruptcy and liquidation. Tower Records was purchased by a separate entity and was not affected by the retail store closings.

On November 13, 2020, Tower Records announced that it had returned as an online retailer with plans to open future physical locations.

== History ==
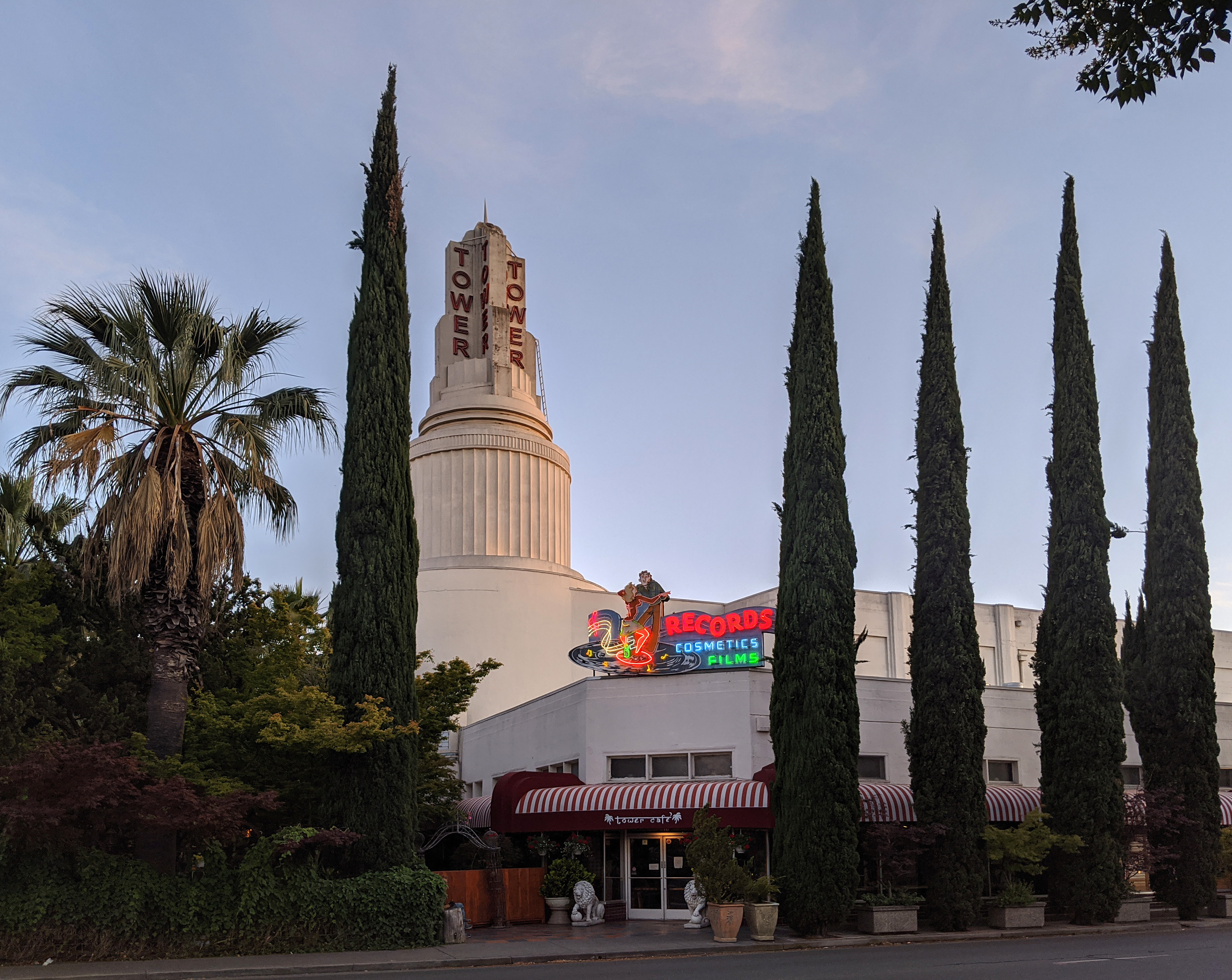
The Tower Theatre in Sacramento, California, where Russ Solomon first sold records from his father's Tower Drugs – now the Tower Cafe

=== Inception, expansion, and description ===
In 1960, Russell Solomon opened the first Tower Records store on Broadway, in Sacramento, California. He named it after his father's drugstore, which shared a building and name with the Tower Theatre, where Solomon first started selling records. The first stand-alone Tower Records store was located at 2514 Watt Ave in the Arden Arcade area of Sacramento. By 1976, Solomon had opened Tower Books, Posters, and Plants at 1600 Broadway, next door to another Sacramento Tower Records location. In 1995, Tower.com opened, making the enterprise one of the first retailers to move online.

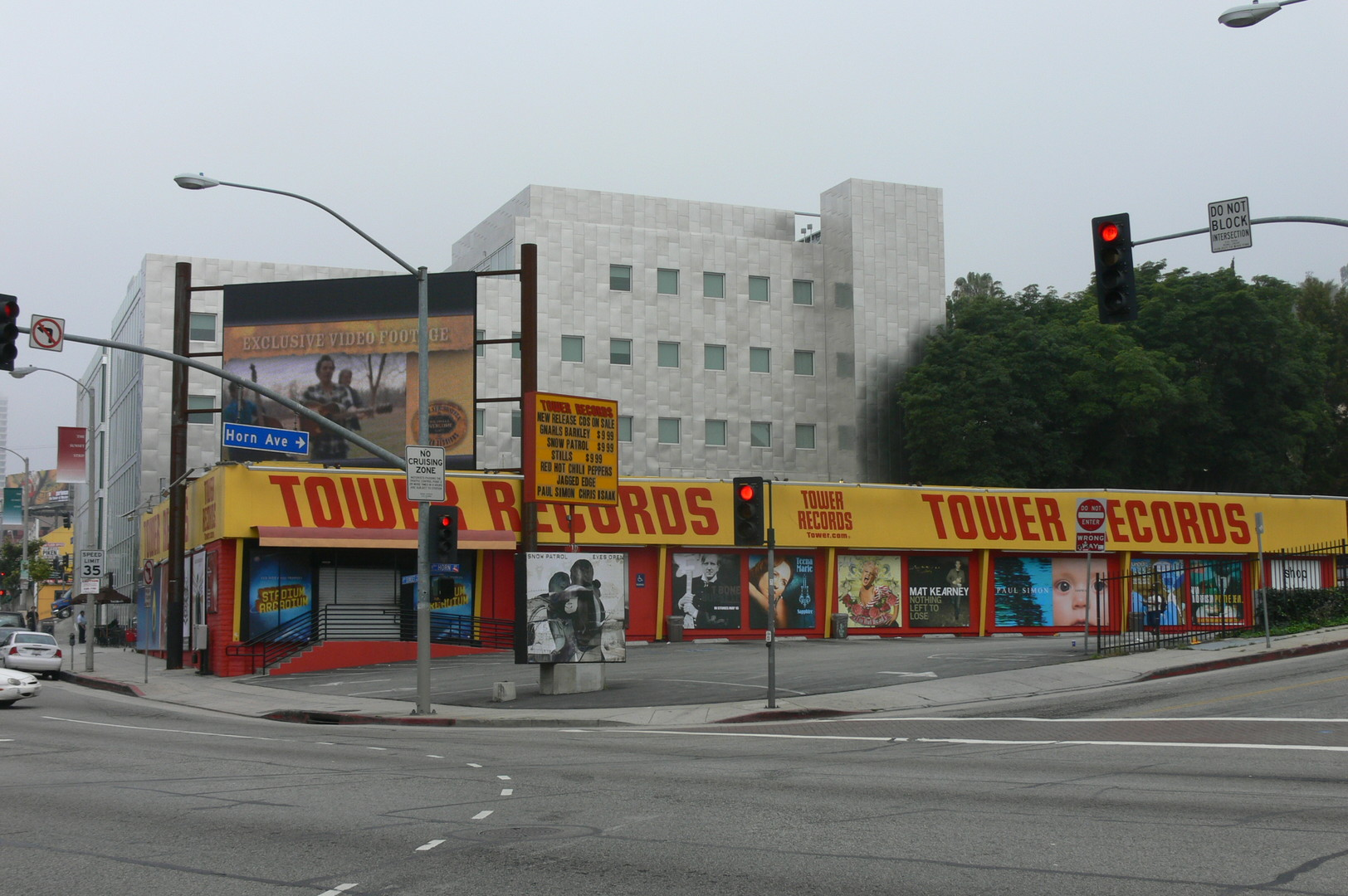
Tower Records on the Sunset Strip

Seven years after its founding, Tower Records expanded to San Francisco, opening a store in what was originally a grocery store at Bay Street and Columbus Avenue. In 1979, Tower Records in Japan started its business as the Japan Branch of MTS Incorporated. The following year, Sapporo Store, the first in Japan and internationally, opened. The chain eventually expanded internationally to include stores in the United Kingdom, Canada, Hong Kong, Taiwan, Singapore, South Korea, Thailand, Malaysia, the Philippines, Ireland, Israel, the United Arab Emirates, Mexico, Colombia, Ecuador, and Argentina. The Tower Records stores in Japan split off from the main chain and are now independent.

Arguably the most famous Tower Records outlet was the purpose-built building that company staff general-contracted, with many personally contributing their labor, which opened in 1971 on the northwest corner of Sunset Boulevard and Horn Avenue in West Hollywood.

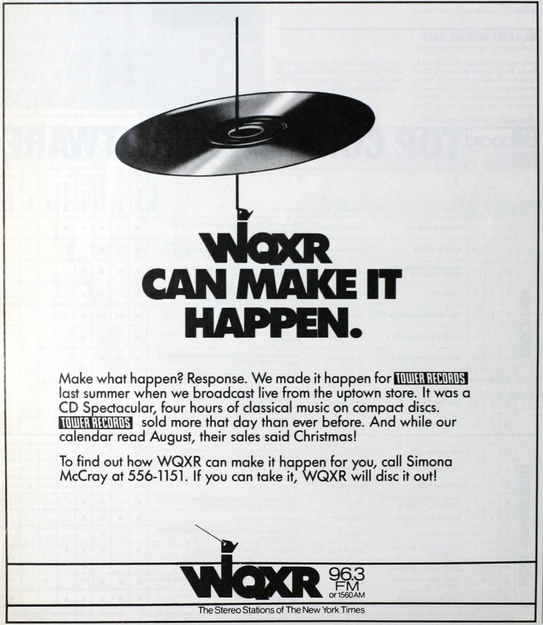
An advertisement from WQXR promoting CD compilation for Tower Records, 1986

In New York City, Tower Records operated a suite of stores on and near lower Broadway in Greenwich Village. The main store was located at the southeast corner of East 4th Street and Broadway. The Tower Records Annex was in the same building, located at the southwest corner of East 4th and Lafayette Street. The third store, Tower Video, was located on the southeast corner of East 4th and Lafayette Street, and specialized in video and the second floor of this location also sold books. Their location on the Upper West Side, near Lincoln Center on 66th Street and Broadway, was a magnet for those working in the field of musical theatre. There was also a location in the basement of Trump Tower, and a small clearance annex on 86th Street on the Upper East Side of Manhattan.

The Nashville location on West End Avenue (across from Vanderbilt University) was in a former Packard dealership. The old showroom floor in front was devoted to CDs, cassettes and vinyl. The area in the back housed videocassette sales and rentals, PC and console games and music paraphernalia. The strip mall next door contained a separate Tower Books. The location was famous for their late-night Monday events that culminated at midnight on Tuesday when staff started ringing up sales of new releases. Because of the store's proximity to Music Row, country music stars could occasionally be seen performing or shopping there. As part of a 2002 settlement with 41 states over CD price fixing Tower Records, along with retailers Musicland and Trans World Entertainment, agreed to pay a $3 million (~$5.13 million in 2025) fine. It is estimated that between 1995 and 2000 customers were overcharged by nearly $500 million and up to $5 per album.

In 2005, the company began using "scan and listen" stations in its stores. These stations allowed customers to listen to audio samples from CDs and to search for particular songs, albums and artists. In the years that followed, this model of listening station was still used at the Arizona-based chain Zia Records.

In 2006, the company introduced the Tower Insider program. The program was free of charge and allowed a customer to receive a membership card that could be scanned with each purchase, allowing the customer to receive coupons and notification of special deals via e-mail.

In addition to compact discs and cassette tapes, the stores sold DVDs, electronic gadgets like mp3 players, video games, accessories, and toys, and a few Tower Records locations sold books as well, such as those in Fremont, Brea, Mountain View, and Sacramento, California, as well as stores in Austin, Boston, Massachusetts, Nashville, New York City, Portland, Oregon, and Seattle and Bellevue, Washington.

=== Pulse! magazine ===
In 1983, the company began publishing a music magazine, Pulse!, which contained record reviews, interviews, and advertising. Initially, it was given away free in their stores to promote their record sales. After nine years, in 1992, the magazine began national distribution with a cover price of $2.95, (~$7.00 in 2025) but it was canceled when the company discontinued U.S. operations. From 1983 until December 2002 Tower Records published it monthly, 222 issues in all.

=== Bankruptcy ===
Tower Records entered Chapter 11 bankruptcy for the first time in 2004. Factors cited were the heavy debt incurred during its aggressive expansion in the 1990s, growing competition from mass discounters, and Internet piracy. Mismanagement and crippling restrictions from the first bankruptcy deal also contributed to Tower's demise.

Some observers took a pragmatic view. As Robert Moog, inventor of the Moog synthesizer, has stated: "I'm sorry if Tower Records' and Blockbuster's sales plummet. On the other hand, it wasn't that long ago that those megastore chains drove a lot of neighborhood record stores out of business."

In February 2004, the debt was estimated to be between $80 million and $100 million, and assets totaled just over $100 million.

On August 20, 2006, Tower Records filed Chapter 11 bankruptcy for the second time, in order to facilitate a purchase of the company prior to the holiday shopping season.

=== Liquidation ===
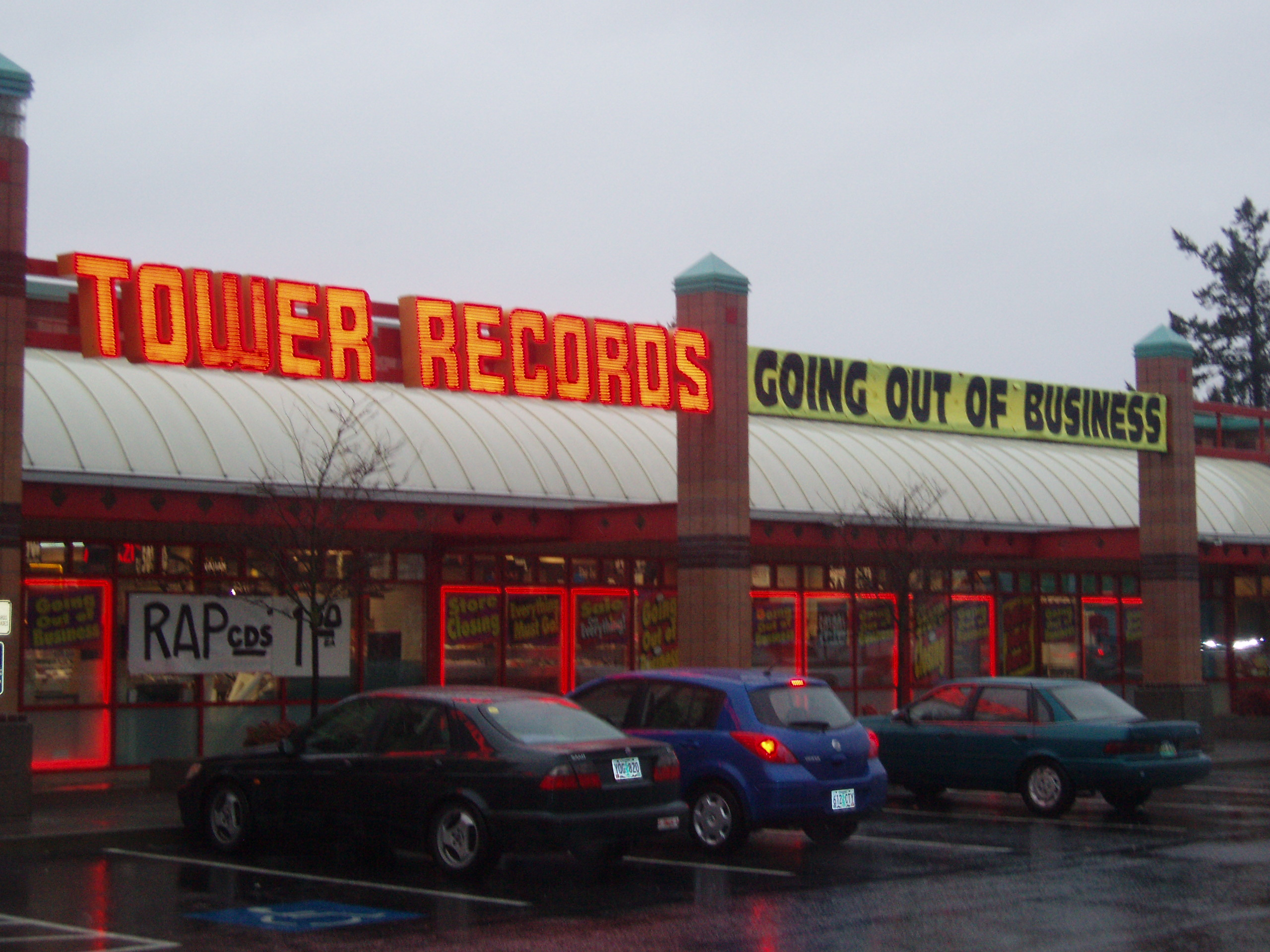
A liquidating Tower Records store in Portland, Oregon

On October 6, 2006, Great American Group won an auction of the company's assets and commenced liquidation proceedings the following day. This included going-out-of-business sales at all U.S. Tower Records locations, the last of which closed on December 22, 2006. The Tower Records website was sold separately to Caiman Inc.

The managers of f.y.e., a music store chain based in shopping malls, had negotiated a deal to acquire the two historic Tower locations in the latter's home base of Sacramento. f.y.e. later backed out, stating that the "leases aren't what we thought they were". f.y.e. did acquire the lease of the West End Avenue store in Nashville, which eventually closed in 2011. f.y.e. also took over Tower Records in Torrance, which continued to operate until early 2016.

Rasputin Music, a new and used music and video store based in the San Francisco Bay Area, expanded in the Central Valley of California by acquiring the leases for the former Tower Records stores in Fresno and Stockton.

== Other stores ==
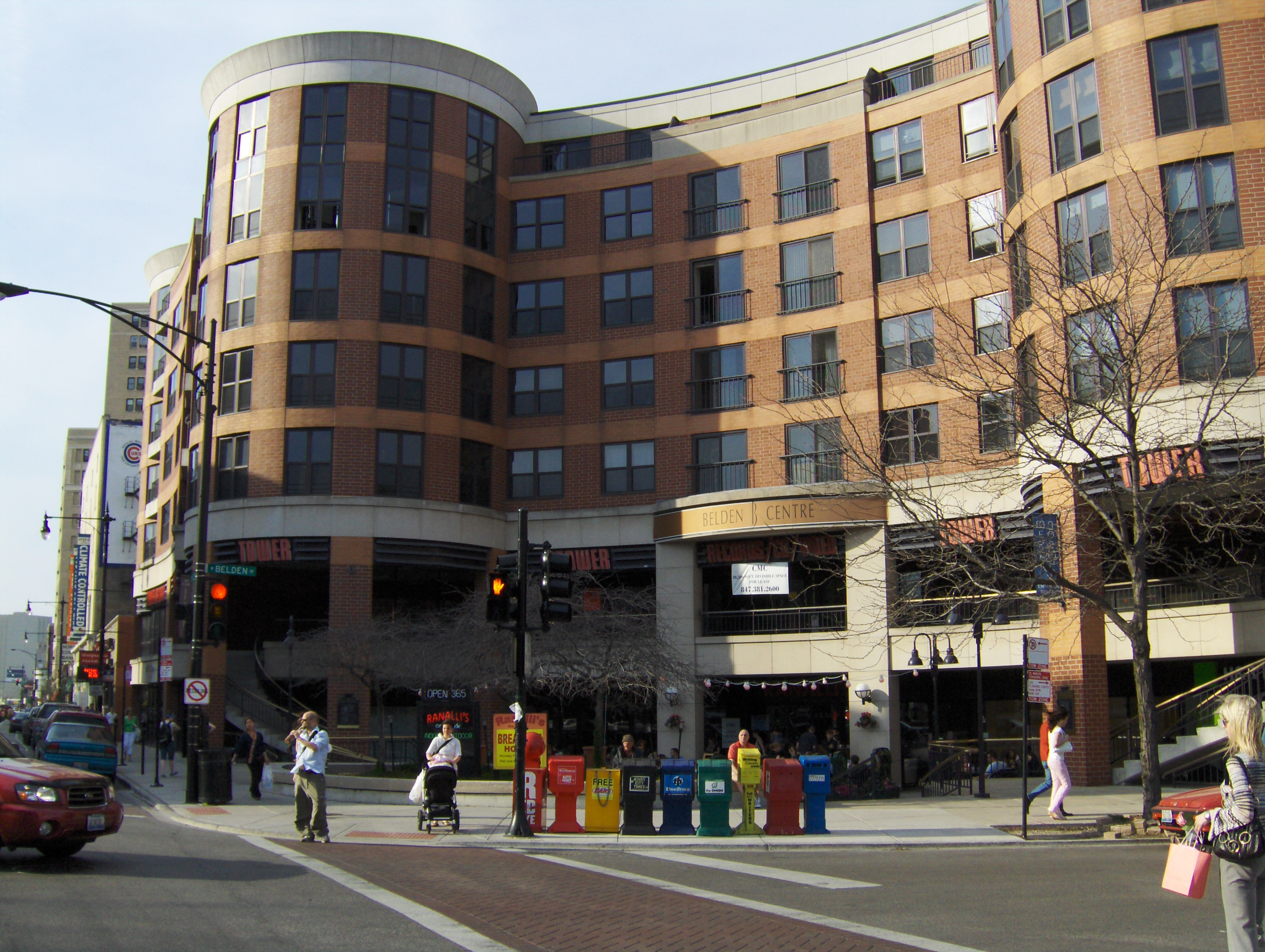
Tower Records for rent in Lincoln Park, Chicago

The Landmark Plaza Tower Records Store in Alexandria, Virginia was permanently closed on December 18, 2006, and the Tysons Corner, Virginia, store permanently closed on December 21, 2006. The noted 24-year-old store in Washington, D.C. (Foggy Bottom) closed down the next day, as did the store in Atlanta, Georgia.

On Friday, December 22, 2006 – 40 years after Solomon had opened the first Tower Records store in Sacramento – the last Tower Records store in New York City, located at 1961 Broadway, one block north of Lincoln Center, on Manhattan's West Side, closed permanently along with all of the other remaining Tower Records stores in the United States. The final Tower Records store (in the Pacific Time Zone) to be closed was the one in Mountain View, which closed at 5:00 p.m.

One building in Sacramento had been a Tower Records store for 40 years, and the lot across the street had been the location where Solomon began selling records in 1941.

R5 Records closed on June 4, 2010, and was sold to rival Dimple Records, which reopened the store in mid-July 2010. Dimple Records closed all of its locations in 2019.

The Tower Records building in Boston, located at the intersection of Newbury Street and Massachusetts Avenue, was instrumental in the conversion of the former street's commercial value. The eight-story building, renovated by Frank Gehry in the late 80s, is prominently visible from the eastbound Massachusetts Turnpike. The store (which occupied the first five stories) featured gold stars of Boston artists (including Gang Starr, New Kids on the Block, and Yo-Yo Ma) embedded in the front landing. Virgin Megastore took over the store from 2002 to 2007. The space was later a Best Buy store and, after being vacant for some time, in 2016 was opened as a T.J. Maxx store.

=== Online return ===
Online merchant Caiman, Inc., reopened the website from Montreal, Quebec, on June 1, 2007. This company also announced plans to reopen the stores themselves—opening stores in Los Angeles, New York, and San Francisco within the next nine months, however this never came to fruition. They hired former Tower buyer Kevin Hawkins to assist with the re-opening (Hawkins, along with former Tower employee George Scarlett, then left Caiman). In 2009, Richard Flynn was hired as president. The website remained based in Montreal, but the relaunch of the brand never moved forward.

As of November 2020, Tower Records re-opened their online store with a new website, once again selling vinyl records among other merchandise, which also features an online version of Pulse that is updated regularly.

=== Tower Labs ===
In October 2022, Tower Labs was opened in Brooklyn, New York, marking the first physical iteration of the brand since 2006. "The intention of Tower Labs is for artists and bands to host personal gatherings with their community, similar to a backstage experience," says Tower Records' new president, Danny Zeijdel. "In an increasingly digital world, it is imperative for artists to have a physical space where they can connect and create." Tower Labs is a creative space, as the brand continues to explore the potential reopening of a flagship retail location.

== International stores ==
=== Argentina ===
Tower Records operated nine stores in Argentina in Buenos Aires, Pilar, San Isidro, Puerto Madryn, Córdoba, and La Plata. It opened its first store in 1997 and closed its last in 2006.

=== Canada ===
Tower Records operated in Canada in the mid-1990s with a flagship store at the Toronto Eaton Centre at the corner of Queen and Yonge which opened in December 1995 and closed in 2001. Tower Records opened a second location in Toronto in the late nineties at Empress Walk in North York, also on Yonge Street, but it was closed just prior to the flagship store closing.

=== Hong Kong ===
Tower Records opened stores in Hong Kong in the 1990s. There were two stores, one located on the seventh floor of Times Square at Causeway Bay, the other at Diamond Hill.

=== Ireland ===
Tower Records is operated in Ireland by Record & Discs Ltd. (owned by Eclective) under a licensed franchise of MTS Incorporated (USA). As of 2026, two stores still operate in Ireland both located in Dublin, one on Dawson Street and the other on O'Connell Street upstairs in Easons.

=== Israel ===
Tower Records Israel opened in 1993; a joint venture between Tower Records USA (MTS INC of W. Sacramento, CA) and two local businessmen. The Founding Director was Joel Abramson, who had previously managed Tower's flagship Sunset Strip location in Los Angeles. The first three locations were in Tel Aviv (the Opera Tower), Haifa (Hutzot HaMifratz, opened in early 1995) and Jerusalem (1995). The Tel Aviv location, with its beachfront location, was a popular shopping spot for Israeli pop stars like David Broza, Meir Ariel, Aviv Gefen, Riki Gal and others. TRI closed its final location in Ra'anana in November 2015, at its peak Tower Records had 40 locations in Israel.

=== Japan ===
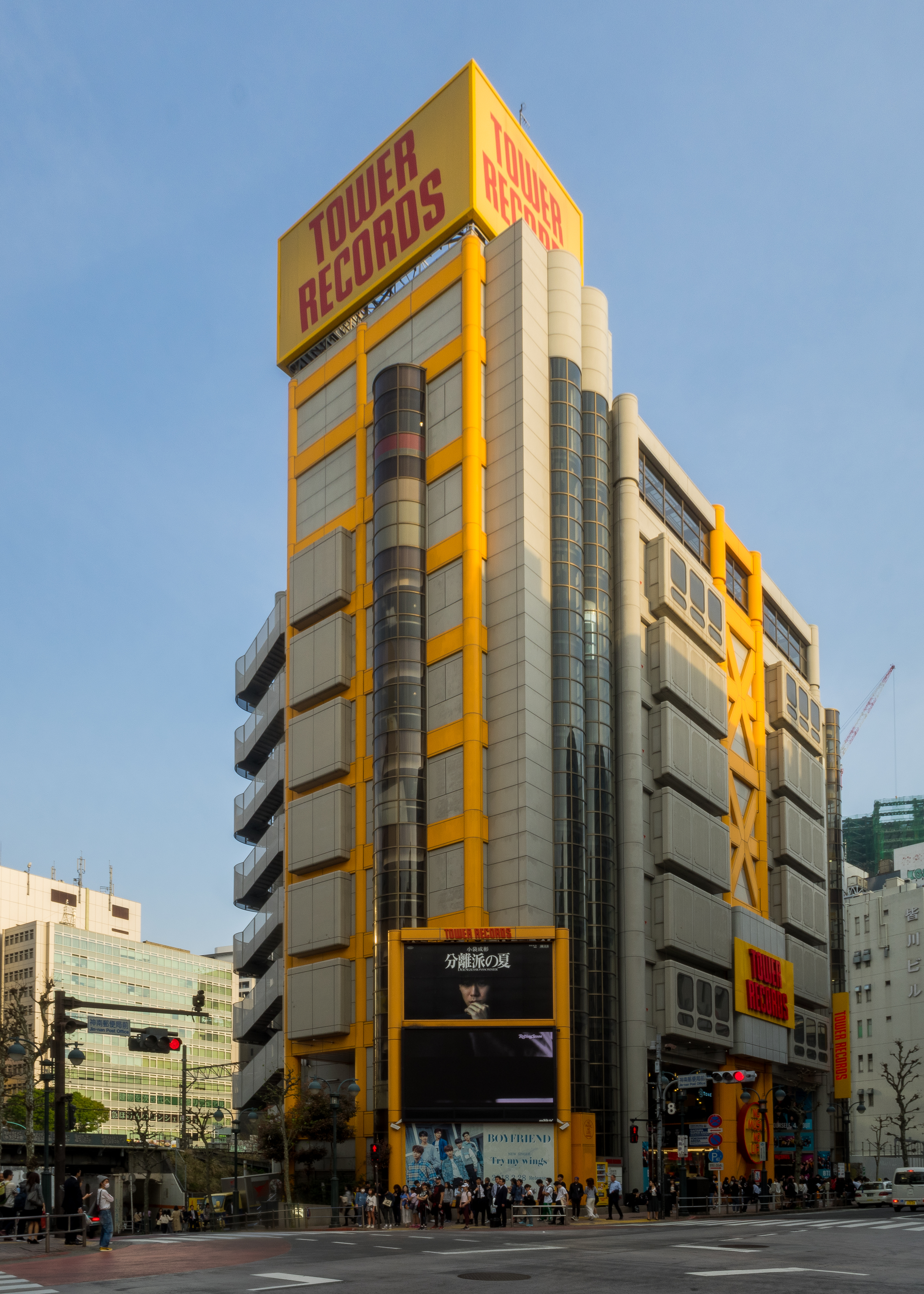
Tower Shibuya store

In 1979, Tower Records in Japan started its business as the Japan Branch of MTS Incorporated. The following year, Sapporo Store, the first in Japan, opened. In 1981, Japanese subsidiary Tower Records Japan Inc. (TRJ) was established.

In October 2002, TRJ went independent from the international chain by management buyout. The bankruptcy of Tower Records in the U.S. in 2006 did not affect TRJ because it had been completely independent (as of 2015, NTT DoCoMo and Seven & I Holdings are the main stakeholders). As of October 1, 2014, TRJ maintains 85 directly operated store locations throughout Japan, including 10 Tower Mini Stores and the Shibuya Store in Tokyo (moved to the current location in March 1995), which is said to be one of the biggest music retail outlets in the world, occupying selling space of 5,000 m^{2} (9 floors). TRJ also publishes the free magazines Tower, bounce, and intoxicate directly and through its subsidiary NMNL. In 2014, Tower Records launched the music review website Mikiki, which also posts content from the previously mentioned magazines.

In addition to being the leading CD retailer in Japan, TRJ was the majority stakeholder in Napster Japan, a joint venture between TRJ and Napster LLC. On March 1, 2010, Napster Japan and TRJ announced that Napster Japan would terminate all of its services on May 31, 2010, due to the difficulty in covering the costs of maintaining the required systems to continue the services.

Tower Records Japan has a subsidiary record label called T-Palette Records, which specializes in idol performers.

=== Mexico ===
Tower Records opened the first store in the Mexico City Zona Rosa area in October 1993, a two-story building. The company's founder was present in its inauguration, as was Mexican singer Luis Miguel. Two years later, in November 1995, for the inauguration of the second store, in Altavista, the special guest was Spanish singer Rocio Durcal, as well as other local musical guests. After international bankruptcy, the stores were acquired by Promotora Musical, a retail company owned by Grupo Carso, the same owner of Mixup record stores. There were Tower Records stores in Mexico City (Gran Sur, Altavista and Mundo E), and Monterrey (Paseo San Pedro), but eventually closed. The store in Puebla (Las Animas) closed after 21 years and was replaced by the Mexican store franchise, Mixup. It was one of the last record stores in Mexico, and the last Tower Records store in the Americas.

=== Philippines ===
Tower Records opened three stores in the Philippines in the 1990s. The first branch was located in Glorietta 3 Ayala Center Makati City which opened in 1998. The second store was in Alabang Town Center Muntinlupa City which opened in 1999. The third store was in Robinson's Place Manila, all of which are in the National Capital Region. As of 2018, all these branches have closed.

=== Singapore ===
Tower Records opened stores in Singapore in the 1990s. Singapore had two Tower Records outlets, one at Pacific Plaza that opened in 1993 and the other at Suntec City. Tower Records Pacific Plaza moved out in 2001 and the latter closed its doors in 2006 when Tower Records filed for bankruptcy globally and eventually folded.

=== South Korea ===
Tower Records opened stores in South Korea in the 1990s, with stores in Seoul and Busan. The Seoul branch became part of Synnara Record (now Media Synnara) and is now part of M2U Record, while the Busan branch has closed.

The Seoul branch was used as one of the main filming locations for Seoul Broadcasting System's 2001 drama Beautiful Days, starring Lee Byung-hun, Choi Ji-woo, Ryu Si-won, Shin Min-a, Lee Jung-hyun and Lee Yoo-jin.

=== Taiwan ===
Tower Records opened three megastores in Taipei, Taiwan in the 1990s. All stores were located in popular areas of Taipei, and became centers of fashion and music during their existence. The stores closed in December 2003.

=== Thailand ===
Tower Records opened stores in Thailand in the 1990s, introducing comprehensive music CD stocking into Thailand for the first time with revolutionary effects on the retail music business. There were several stores in Bangkok, including three megastores inside popular malls. One of the biggest megastores was located on the top floor of CentralWorld mall in central Bangkok. In the 2000s as business declined due to piracy and the downloading revolution, the stores were progressively closed and the remaining ones were eventually sold to another dealer.

=== United Kingdom ===
Tower Records in the United Kingdom was originally a London-based concern, with a first store in Kensington High Street in 1984 being followed the next year by a 25,000-square-foot (2,300 m^{2}) flagship outlet at 9 Piccadilly Circus and later two more smaller outlets at Whiteleys in Bayswater, and Kingston. However, by the start of the 1990s the chain had grown to encompass a number of other stores, with large entertainment stores also selling movies, books, magazines and games in Birmingham and Glasgow, as well as a number of smaller stores that had been purchased from rival American retailer Sam Goody when it had left the UK marketplace (an example of this express format was in Weston-super-Mare).

However, with tough trading conditions in the UK market, as well as the company's trouble in the States, the firm followed Sam Goody in retreating from the UK market. The London stores in Piccadilly and Kensington were sold to Virgin Group in 2003, who for a while traded under the Tower brand at the former site until the store could be fully refurbished, while the other stores were closed. The store was subsequently renamed Zavvi in September 2007 after a management buyout of the Virgin Megastores. Zavvi entered administration in late 2008 and administrators closed the Piccadilly store on Wednesday, January 14, 2009.

== Documentaries ==
The 2015 documentary All Things Must Pass: The Rise and Fall of Tower Records by filmmaker Colin Hanks chronicles the rise and fall of Tower Records, using archival footage and exclusive interviews with former staff, especially Russell Solomon and former COO Stan Goman, as well as celebrity customers Bruce Springsteen, Elton John and Dave Grohl.

Another documentary called Art Gods (2013) is an oral history of the development of an influential in-store display design ethic at Tower, originating from the Berkeley location.
