= Kaspien =

Defunct American ecommerce software company

Kaspien Holdings, Inc.
- Formerly: Trans World Entertainment (1972–2020)
- Type: Public
- Traded as: Nasdaq: KSPN; Russell Microcap Index component
- Industry: Retail
- Founded: December 1972; 53 years ago
- Founder: Robert J. Higgins
- Defunct: May 2024
- Fate: Dissolved
- Headquarters: Spokane, Washington, U.S.
- Key people: Brock Kowalchuk (interim CEO)
- Website: kaspien.com

Kaspien Holdings, Inc. (formerly Trans World Entertainment) was an American company that provided software and services for ecommerce. Kaspien Holdings operated on Amazon in the United States, Canada, United Kingdom, Spain, France, Italy, Germany, the Netherlands, Sweden, and India, as well as Walmart Marketplace, eBay, Google Shopping, and Target. Its interim CEO was Goldman Sachs veteran Brock Kowalchuk, who took over March 11, 2022.

== History ==
=== Trans World Entertainment Corporation ===
Based in Albany, New York, Trans World was formed in 1972 by Robert Higgins. It opened its first store, Record Town (formerly Record Land), in 1973. The company went public in July 1986 and expanded through acquisitions of a number of smaller or failing companies including Strawberries, Coconuts, Camelot Music, and Wherehouse Entertainment.

On September 23, 2000, Trans World signed a definitive agreement to acquire the assets of WaxWorks, and the deal was expected to close by the end of October.

As part of a 2002 settlement with 41 states over CD price fixing, Trans World Entertainment, along with retailers Musicland and Tower Records, agreed to pay a $3 million fine. It is estimated that between 1995 and 2000 customers were overcharged by nearly $500 million and up to $5 per album.

In February 2006, Trans World acquired the Musicland Group, which owned Musicland, Discount Records, Sam Goody, Suncoast Motion Picture Company, Media Play, and On Cue. The buyout included a handful of On Cue stores.

Trans World operated at a net loss from 2006 to 2010. In fiscal year 2011 it turned a profit of $2.2 million (compared to a $31 million loss in FY 2010). The company closed some locations and increased margins on its products.

=== Acquiring etailz, Inc. ===
In October 2016, Trans World acquired etailz, Inc, a third-party online retailer, for $76 million.

etailz was founded in 2008 by Josh Neblett, Sarah Wollnick (now Sarah Neblett), and Tom Simpson as GreenCupboards and had operated as a niche retailer of eco-friendly products. The company rebranded to etailz in 2013 after acquiring Ecomom.

In January 2019, etailz laid off 20 percent of its workforce after Trans World reported a $14 million loss in the third quarter of 2018. etailz's founder and CEO left the company shortly thereafter in March 2019. In September 2019, etailz hired a new CEO, Kunal Chopra.

In January 2020, Trans World sold its FYE segment for $10 million to Sunrise Records and Entertainment Ltd., severing its ties to physical retail stores and leaving etailz as its only remaining subsidiary.

In March 2020, Trans World reconstituted its board of directors and its CEO stepped down. New members joined the board to reinforce the company's focus on ecommerce, including etailz founder Tom Simpson.

=== Sale and rebranding to Kaspien Holdings ===
On September 3, 2020, Trans World Entertainment rebranded to Kaspien Holdings (the name "Trans World Entertainment" was sold to Sunrise Records). Its remaining subsidiary, etailz, also changed their name to Kaspien, merging the two companies and solidifying the focus on ecommerce.

=== Closure ===
In December 2023, Kaspien announced it would wind down operations and permanently shut down on May 1, 2024.

== Formerly owned chains before sale to Sunrise Records ==
- Coconuts Movies & Music: Evansville, Indiana (Formerly nationwide)
- Sam Goody: St. Clairsville, Ohio and Medford, Oregon (Formerly nationwide)
- Spec's Music: San Juan, Puerto Rico
- Suncoast Motion Picture Company: Beaumont, Texas, Eatontown, New Jersey, Omaha, Nebraska, and Portland, Oregon. (Formerly nationwide)
- SecondSpin.com: Online (sold to Sunrise Records in 2020)
- Manifest Discs and Tapes: Charlotte, North Carolina
- FYE: Nationwide (mall-based and freestanding)

=== Defunct ===
- Camelot Music
- CD World: New Jersey and Missouri
- Disc Jockey: Southern U.S. (mall-based)
- Incredible Universe, joint venture with Tandy Corporation: Nationwide (17 stores; closed in 1996, six stores sold to Fry's Electronics; )
- Leopold's: California
- Media Play: Nationwide (closed in 2006)
- Music World: New England states
- On Cue: Nationwide
- Planet Music: Virginia Beach
- Peaches: Nationwide
- Record & Tape Traders: Multiple locations in Baltimore area, last location in Towson closed in 2019
- Record Factory: Brisbane, CA
- Record Land: Nationwide (mall-based)
- Record Town: Nationwide (mall-based)
- Record World: Mid-Atlantic and New England states (mall-based)
- Saturday Matinee: Now only one location at Rockaway Townsquare in Rockaway, New Jersey; other locations closed or converted to Suncoast; previously operated in California, Colorado, Connecticut, Delaware, Illinois, Maryland, Michigan, New Jersey, New York, North Carolina, Virginia, Texas, Mississippi, Pennsylvania and Ohio
- Spec's Music Inc.: Florida
- Spin Street: Tennessee (closed 2017)
- Square Circle: Nationwide (mall-based)
- Strawberries: Texas, Maryland, New England and Mid-Atlantic states
- Streetside Records: Missouri, Midwest
- Tape World: Nationwide (mall-based)
- Vibrations: South Florida
- The Wall: Mid-Atlantic states
- Wall To Wall Sound & Video / Listening Booth: Mid-Atlantic states, later converted to The Wall
- Wherehouse Entertainment: Arizona, California, Colorado (formerly Rocky Mountain Records), Georgia, Louisiana, Missouri, New Mexico, Oklahoma, Oregon, Texas, Utah, Virginia, and Washington; filed for bankruptcy in 2003; Trans World took control of 111 stores and liquidated nearly a third of them Continued as an online buyer/seller until October 9, 2018, when the website closed.
