= Camelot Music =

American music retailer

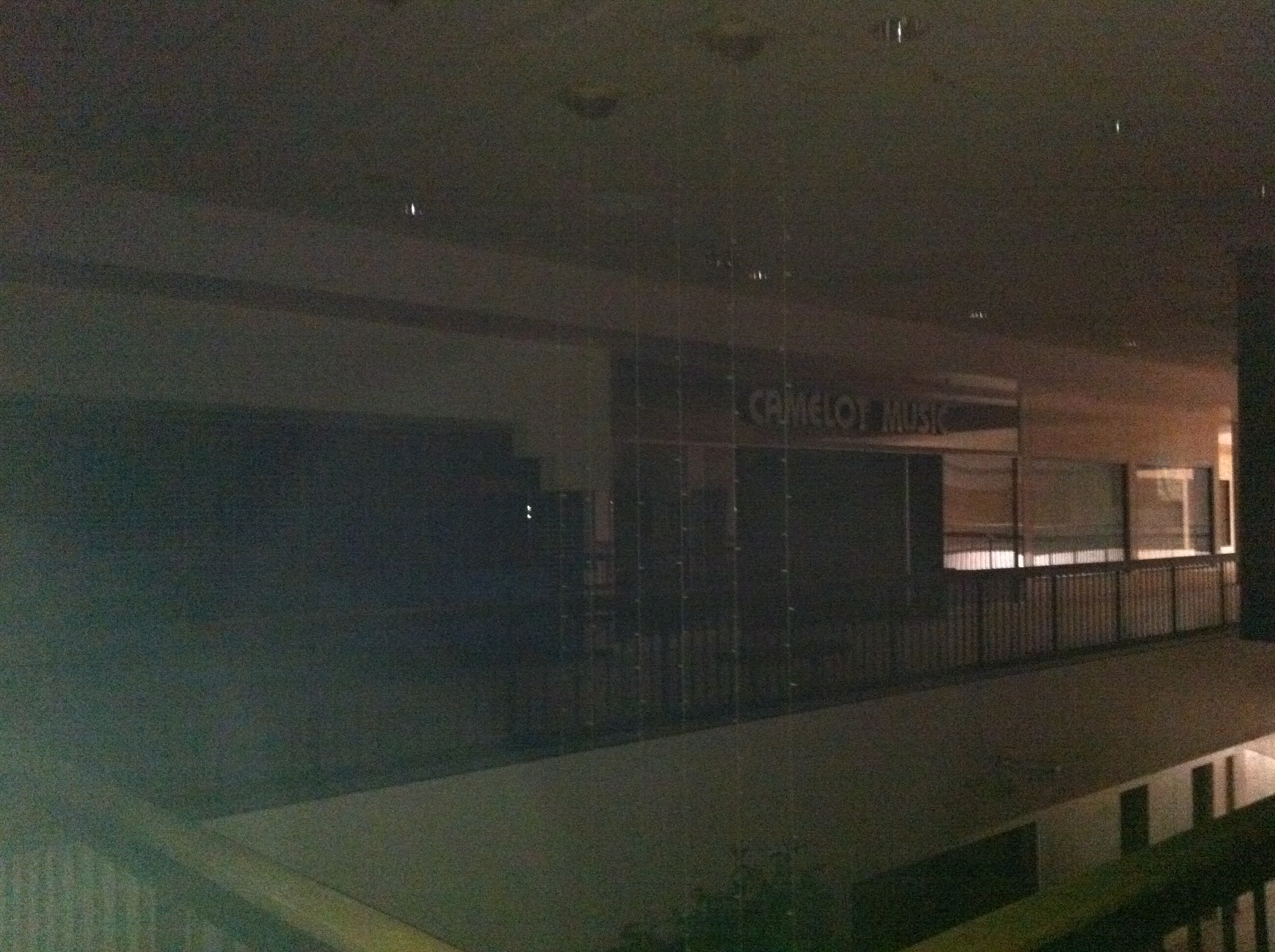
- An abandoned Camelot Music in Augusta, Georgia
- Founded: 1956 in Massillon, Ohio
- Defunct: 1998
- Fate: Merger to Trans World Entertainment

Camelot Music was a mall-based American retailer of prerecorded music and accessories and was one of the largest music retailers in the United States based on store count. Camelot specialized in the sales of prerecorded music, especially vinyl LP, 45-rpm records, cassette tapes, CDs, and video/music accessories.

As of May 31, 1998, the company operated 455 stores in 37 states nationwide under two brand names: Camelot Music and The Wall. Camelot Music consisted of 305 stores with the majority being based in the Midwestern and Southeastern United States, while The Wall had 150 stores located primarily in the Mid Atlantic and Northeast regions of the country. Industrial experts' assessment ranked the company as the third largest amongst specialty retailer store of recorded music.

In late 1998, the Camelot Music group was acquired by Trans World Entertainment, which later consolidated all of its mall-based music stores under the brand name FYE, including the remaining Camelot and The Wall locations.

In January 2020, Ancaster, ON-based Sunrise Records announced and subsequently finalized their purchase of the 206 store FYE music retailer from Trans World Entertainment for $10 million. Doug Putman, the owner and CEO of the Canadian company stated he plans to continue the FYE name for the present US stores. Putman recently purchased the 100 store HMV entertainment group and plans to open the Sunrise Records branded chain in all 70 Canadian leases now under the HMV banner. Camelot Music stores will continue to be named FYE.

== Background/overview ==
Camelot Music Inc. was founded in 1956 by Paul David in Massillon, Ohio. Initially operating as Stark Record and Tape Service, the company placed racks of LPs, 45 rpm records and cassettes in rented store space and maintained their stock and displays. In 1965, the company opened its first retail store as Camelot Music in North Canton, Ohio with another store opening in the Mellett Mall (now Canton Centre) a few months later. While Camelot focused on being situated primarily in shopping centres or malls, it later diversified into free standing locations and music departments in leased spaces located in large discount stores.

Camelot intensified its efforts and geographic market by the acquisition of other record retailer chains, including the California-based Rainbow Records in 1990, and Philadelphia-based music retailer Record World in 1992. Furthermore, Camelot entered a corporate agreement to buy some of the holdings of Wee Three Records, a UK-owned chain that had gone bankrupt - specifically, six additional stores and the inventory from several more outlets.

By 1993, the company owned a total of 360 stores across the United States. Later that year, founder Paul David stepped down as CEO, turning the position to COO of Camelot James Bonk; David also sold his majority holdings of Camelot Inc to Investcorp through a stock swap. Stock or equity based swaps have been a common strategy for companies to obtain majority control over companies. Following the acquisition of Camelot, Investcorp purchased Hastings Music & Books and the Cavages music retailers.

== Bankruptcy and post-administrative operations ==
By mid 1996, as a consequence of the changing nature of work alongside Investcorp's leveraged buyout of Camelot Inc from David the company found itself closing a number of its stores, laying off staff and eventually leading to filing a Chapter 11 Bankruptcy Protection Agreement. The Chapter 11 Plan allowed the company to operate continually at a loss, so as to pay off creditors. In 1997, following corporate and debt reorganization, the company emerged from its bankruptcy with its creditors as the new owners.

In 1998, free from its bankruptcy court supervision, the company acquired certain assets of The Wall, formerly owned by British company WHSmith taking over 153 of their mid-Atlantic chain-based stores. The Wall was best known for its trademark "Lifetime Music Guarantee", which offered free replacements for cassettes and CDs that had been damaged in any way. They were also notable for allowing customers to listen to CDs before buying them, and for their "Repeat Performer" customer card program, where 20 card punches earned a free CD or cassette tape.

Later in 1998, Camelot merged with South Florida retailer Spec's Music.

In October 1998, Trans World Entertainment, a video and music retailer, acquired Camelot Inc alongside its acquired companies The Wall and The Spec's for a stock swap valued approximately $427 million. Trans World Entertainment later rebranded the entirety of their music retailer-based stores to FYE with the initials standing for “For Your Entertainment”. FYE continues its operations as a music retailer both online and in stores around the United States.

In March 2017, FYE founder and CEO Bob Higgins died. Higgins was responsible for the creating the FYE brand as well as maintaining its profitability and therefore its status as the last remaining music chain store.

In November 2018, FYE's parent company was accused in federal court of deceiving customers by asking them to sign up for "free" and/or "loyalty" membership programs and magazine subscriptions while charging their credit and debit cards $11.99 per month until customers cancelled the services. Another allegation was that customer information was shared with marketing company Synapse without customer consent.

In 2018, 33 FYE stores were closed, and 35 more were scheduled to be closed before the end of Trans World's fiscal year on February 2, 2019.

In the fiscal year ended Feb 1, 2020, FYE posted a loss of $50.7 million for the retail chain, more than double of the previous year. Later the same year Sunrise Records announced and subsequently finalized their purchase of FYE from TWEC.

== Founder and early inspirations ==
Paul David was one of thirteen siblings born to an immigrant Lebanese family and worked initially as a sales representative. He ventured to work as an independent retail store shelf stacker, stocking vinyl LP and 45 rpm records in low density local stores such as pharmacies, variety, grocers and specialty stores. He then later expanded on towards stocking larger retailers and grocers before opening his first retail store in North Canton, Ohio in 1965 followed by the successful expansion of Camelot Inc across the United States and the acquisitions of several other retailer music stores.

At 70 years of age in 1993, David sold his company to Investcorp and established the Paul & Carol Foundation with his wife, which has since provided scholarship opportunities to over 300 high school students. Further to this, David founded and financially invested in the Massillon Tiger Football Program in 1983. On 2 November 2002, David died at 79 years of age following a brief illness and was buried at St Joseph's Cemetery.

== See also ==
- FYE
- Spec's Music
- Sunrise Records
- HMV Canada
- HMV
