= Princeton Record Exchange =

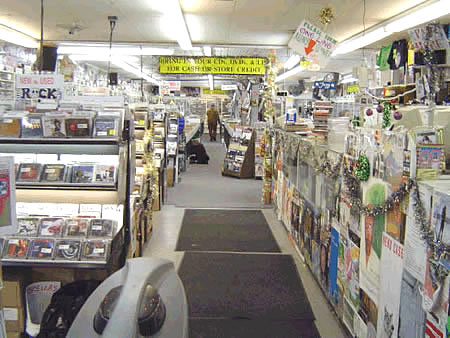
- Type: Record store
- Industry: Music industry
- Founded: 1980 in Princeton, New Jersey
- Founder: Barry Weisfeld
- Owner: Jon Lambert
- Website: www.prex.com

Princeton Record Exchange, located at 20 South Tulane St. in Princeton, New Jersey, is an independent record store. PREX (as it is often referred to) was founded in 1980 by Barry Weisfeld. He had spent five years, beginning in 1975, selling used records from his van at flea markets and college campuses, and wanted to settle in one location. Princeton seemed ideal because of its central location on the east coast. The store opened in 1980 at 20 Nassau St, and moved to its current larger location in 1985.

== History ==
Princeton Record Exchange originated with Long Island record collector Barry Weisfeld, who began selling records from his Chevrolet van after graduating college in 1975. Initially selling at flea markets, Weisfeld switched to college campuses, selling at 27 schools between Dartmouth College and American University. The growing size of his inventory prompted Weisfeld to open a store, which he initially considered doing in Hicksville, New York, before deciding on Princeton. Weisfeld had a number of reasons for choosing to operate in Princeton: the town was halfway between New York City and Philadelphia, was home to a student population at Princeton University, and was in a walkable location during the 1979 oil crisis. Weisfeld was also familiar with the town, having previously done record promotions at the Princeton University Store.

The original store opened in 1980 in a small space at 20 Nassau Street. The store had an inventory of 15,000 records upon opening, comprising mostly new, rare, or discontinued items. Princeton Record Exchange's popularity grew as customers exchanged records for cash and credit.
