= Spec's Music =

- Type: Music Store
- Industry: Retail
- Founded: 1948
- Defunct: 2013
- Fate: Merged with Camelot Music
- Successor: Camelot Music, now FYE
- Number of locations: 0 (2021)
- Products: Music retail, video rental
- Parent: Spec's Music(1948-1998) Camelot Music(June 4, 1998) Trans World Entertainment (Late 1998–2020); Sunrise Records (2020–present)

Spec's Music was a South Florida-based retail music and video rental chain headquartered in Miami. At its height of popularity, Spec's Music operated 80 stores, including 20,000-square-foot (1,900 m^{2}) "superstores" in Miami Beach, West Palm Beach, and Sunrise. The company's stores were located in malls, strip centers, and free-standing locations throughout Florida. Four of the company's stores were located in malls in Puerto Rico. As of 2021, the last location closed. It was located in the Plaza Las Americas mall in Hato Rey, Puerto Rico.

== History ==
=== Beginnings ===
Spec's was incorporated in 1948 by founder Martin Spector. The company's first store was a 1,500-square-foot (140 m^{2}) structure in Coral Gables, Florida, situated on South Dixie Highway on the outskirts of Miami. Inside, the store carried a collection of big-band melodies, recorded on then-standard 78 RPM vinyl discs, and other assorted merchandise.

By the 1950s, Spec's expanded their sales line to include Kodak Brownie cameras, Magnavox television sets, washing machines, and refrigerators. By the 1960s, Martin Spector dropped the concept of selling other electronics in favor of selling just music, and with the birth of rock and roll the stores were now finally able to support themselves by selling music alone. Spec's stores became so popular during this time that Spector expanded his chain to both Broward and Palm Beach Counties by 1967.

=== Expansion ===
Between 1968 and 1980, Spec's expanded at a rate of two stores per year, all located in South Florida. Many of the stores in the 1980s were given a flashy new wave look to them, a style which can still be recognized in many former Spec's locations that are now occupied by f.y.e. The company went public in 1985 after making $16.6 (~$41 million in 2024) Million in sales from its then-16 stores. During this same time, Spec's took advantage of the emerging VHS rental market, and added tape-rental divisions to each store.

By the late 1980s, the number of Spec's stores increased from 16 to 42. In 1988, the company was recognized by Forbes as being one of the nation's 200 best-run small companies.

In 1992, two Spec's stores were entirely destroyed by Hurricane Andrew, resulting in more than $1 million in damages for the company, and an estimated operating loss of $160,000. Also around this time companies like Blockbuster and Musicland began opening outlets in and around Spec's Music's markets, forcing the company to develop new strategies for the future. Aside from opening a prodigious number of new stores and renovating the majority of its existing stores, the company's executives also planned to focus on music selections they felt were under-served by national competitors. This involved placing a greater emphasis on Latin music, classical music, and merchandise targeted for children. To provide room for a greater emphasis on these items, the company decided to remove many of its lackluster video rental departments. By mid-1993, 12 of the video rental departments had been closed and another eight were scheduled for removal in 1994.

Additional changes adopted in 1993 included new fixtures inside the stores that could house a combined stock of compact discs and cassettes, as well as listening "posts," each equipped with two headphones and programmed to play 10 compact discs, with featured titles rotating every several days or weeks. These new additions were showcased in a prototype 7,000-square-foot (650 m^{2}) store that opened in Tallahassee, Florida, in early 1994. A little more than a year later in mid-1995 the company turned to the "superstore" format to try to maintain its leading position in Florida, which was being threatened by increasing competition.

=== Closure ===
In the early 1990s, Spec's opened two new superstores in Coconut Grove and South Beach. These two-story stores each featured more than 70,000 titles, a cafe, and weekend concerts. However, despite the hype surrounding the grand opening of these two new stores, Spec's Music was beginning to show signs of anemic financial performance. Sales and earnings were slipping, forced downward by the continuing stiff competition in Florida. Music sales were down nationwide, and Spec's Music was struggling. By the end of 1995, the company's annual sales stood at $79.6 million, a negligible increase over 1994's total of $78.4, but actual earnings slipped from $2.8 million to a meager $1 million.

An attempt was made to restructure the company by hiring a former Burger King executive and closing several of its superstores. Despite this, on June 4, 1998 it was announced that Spec's would be merged with Camelot Music, then the nation's third-largest music retailer. Soon after the merger, Camelot Music was purchased by TransWorld Entertainment, thus converting most former Spec's locations to FYE.

In early 2013, the last remaining Specs store in South Florida, coincidentally the first store which opened in 1948, closed its doors.

=== International (2021 closure) ===
The Puerto Rico store located in Plaza Las Américas showed the Spec's Music logo at its entrance but operated as FYE. This location closed in 2021.
