= Media Play =

Entertainment retail company

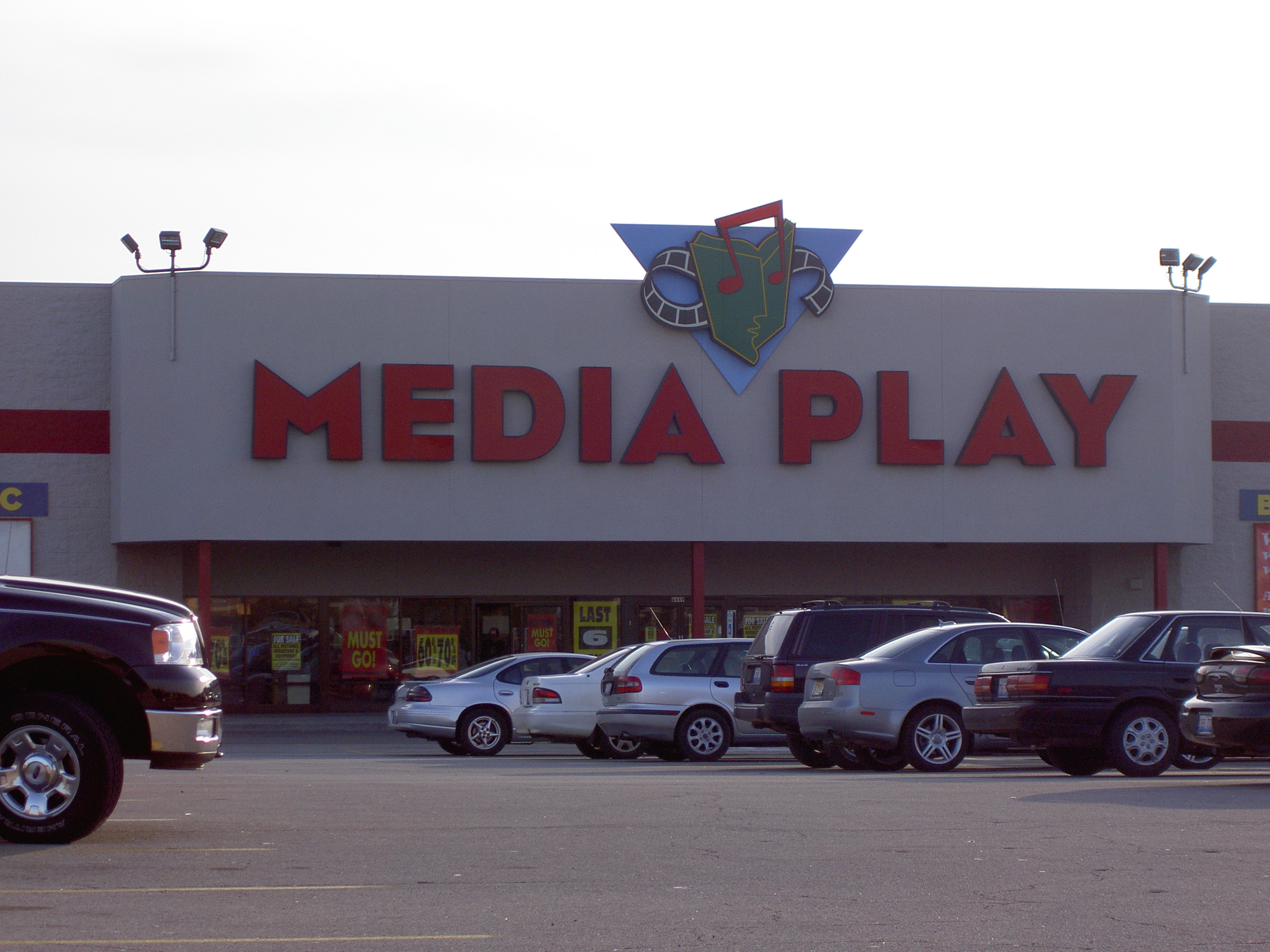
- Media Play store in Rockford, Illinois, during liquidation in 2006
- Founded: 1992; 34 years ago
- Defunct: February 2006
- Fate: Bankruptcy; Liquidation
- Headquarters: Minnetonka, Minnesota, U.S.
- Parent: Musicland
- Website: www.mediaplay.com at the Wayback Machine (archived October 23, 2003)

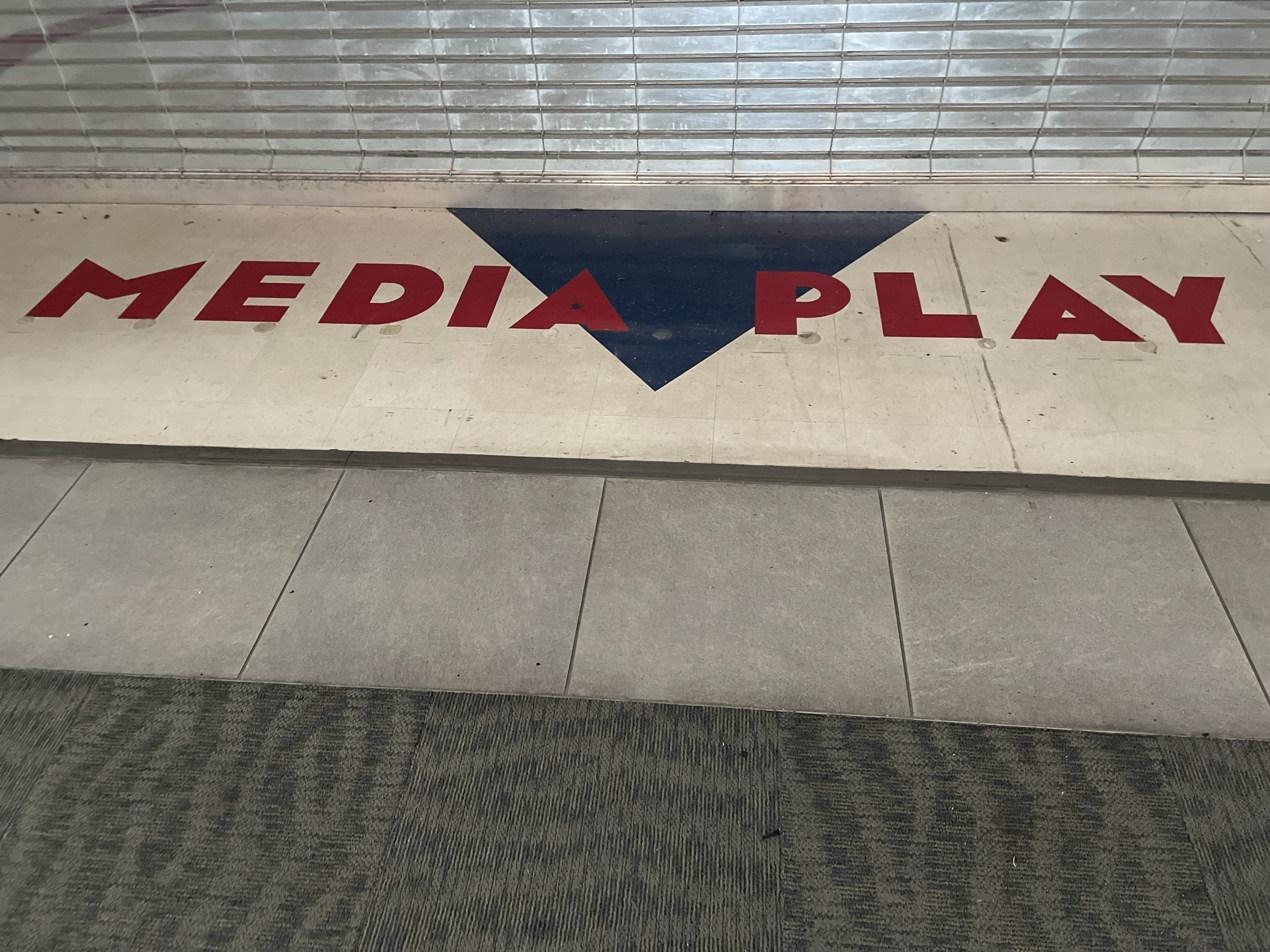
Extant Media Play logo in a former store at Forest Fair Mall

Media Play was an American chain of big-box specialty retail stores, which sold music, home video, electronics, toys, video games, books, and board games. It was owned by Musicland, and operated from 1992 to 2006. At its peak, the chain included 72 stores in 19 U.S. states, with 2,000 employees.

== History ==
The first store opened in Rockford, Illinois, in 1992. Hundreds of stores were slated to be opened, but only 89 ever were. Media Play opened stores from 1992 to 2000.

Their Replay program was a loyalty program that allowed members to earn points for purchases which could earn members gift certificates. The same Replay card also worked at Sam Goody and Suncoast Motion Picture Company stores.

In 2001, Musicland was purchased by Best Buy Co. Inc. for $696 million (~$1.17 billion in 2024). At that point, Musicland had over 1300 stores. Their intention was to transform Sam Goody into a destination for young people looking for hip electronics. They launched a major remerchandising campaign and converted Musicland's On Cue concept of rural stores to the Sam Goody brand, reducing its position in books and moving more into video games and DVD.

=== Decline ===
The store faced strong competition, particularly from websites like Amazon.com, which was founded in 1994 and provided a wider selection than the store-based Media Play. Therefore, despite Best Buy's major efforts, they failed to generate the results they were looking for with Musicland, losing $85 million (~$141 million in 2024) in 2002. As a result, they put the company up for sale and were likely just weeks away from liquidating the entire chain when they found a buyer in Sun Capital Partners of Boca Raton, Florida. Sun Capital Partners acquired the company in a cash-free transaction in exchange for acquiring Musicland's debt and leases. Sun Capital attempted to get the company back to basics, but in December 2005 they announced the closure and liquidation of all remaining Media Play stores.

In December 2005, Minnetonka, Minnesota–based Musicland Group, which owned Media Play, announced it would close all 61 stores by the end of January 2006 and refocus on its Sam Goody and Suncoast chains.

=== Bankruptcy ===
The Musicland Group filed for Chapter 11 bankruptcy in January 2006, and in February announced the closing of 226 Sam Goody and 115 Suncoast Motion Picture Company stores, and all Media Play locations. Just months after the chain closed, the website MediaPlay.com was all that remained. In February 2006, Trans World Entertainment Corp. acquired the Musicland Group, which owned Sam Goody, Suncoast, and MediaPlay.com. Some former Media Play stores became home to f.y.e. superstores beginning in June 2006.
