= Sam Gutowitz =

American retail businessman (1904–1991)

Samuel "Goody" Gutowitz (February 25, 1904 – August 8, 1991) was an American businessman and the founder of the Sam Goody record store chain.

He was born in Manhattan on February 25, 1904,‍ the eldest of three children of Fanny and ladies' tailor Julius Gutowitz, who was born in Poland.‍

He later legally changed his name to Sam Goody.‍

In 1978, Gutowitz sold the Sam Goody chain to the American Can Company for $5.5 million‍ (equivalent to $21 million in 2024‍).

In 1940, Gutowitz married Sadie Deutsch.‍ They had two sons, Howard and Barry, and two daughters.‍
