= Wherehouse Entertainment =

American music retailer

Wherehouse Entertainment, Inc.
- Formerly: Integrity Entertainment Corp.
- Company type: Public
- Traded as: AMEX: WEI
- Industry: Retail
- Founded: 1970; 56 years ago
- Defunct: 2003
- Fate: Purchased by Trans World to be converted to FYE brand
- Headquarters: United States
- Products: DVDs, compact discs, videos, records, video games, books, collectibles, accessories

Wherehouse Entertainment, Inc., formerly Integrity Entertainment Corp., also known as Wherehouse Music and The Wherehouse, was an American retail music franchise.

== History ==
In 1983, Wherehouse Entertainment Inc., renamed from Integrity Entertainment Corp., went public with a public offering of 750,000 shares under the symbol WEI. At this time, the company had 126 stores, primarily in California. In 1984, the company began renting movies, or "video software" in 77 of its 126 stores, with a roll out into further stores expected. Later that year, a copy of Money Hunt: The Mystery of the Missing Link was sold by a Wherehouse Entertainment at Sunset & Western in Los Angeles to Newt Deiter, who would go on to win the $100,000 cash prize.

In August 1998, Wherehouse purchased Blockbuster Music from Viacom. The company filed for Chapter 11 bankruptcy in 2003. In 2003, Trans World Entertainment purchased the remaining 148 Wherehouse stores for $41 million (~$66.8 million in 2024) in cash and assumed liabilities while closing 35 under-performing stores. It is not clear when Trans World Entertainment closed the remaining stores or converted them to FYE brand.
