= CD price fixing =

Illegal price fixing by music companies in the 1990s

Between 1995 and 2000 music companies were found to have used illegal marketing agreements such as minimum advertised pricing to artificially inflate prices of compact discs in order to end price wars by discounters such as Best Buy and Target in the early 1990s. It is estimated customers were overcharged by nearly $500 million and up to $5 per album.

In August 2000, the Federal Trade Commission opened an investigation into price fixing leading to decreased competition and reduction of discounting among music distributors and retailers. This was followed by Florida and New York under Attorney General Eliot Spitzer leading a lawsuit by 41 states against the music industry. A settlement in 2002 included the music publishers and distributors; Sony Music, Warner Music, Bertelsmann Music Group, EMI Music, Universal Music as well as retailers Musicland, Trans World Entertainment and Tower Records. In restitution, they agreed to pay a $67.4 million fine and distribute $75.7 million in CDs to the public and non-profit groups but admitted no wrongdoing.

== See also ==
- Price fixing cases
