= Record shop =

Retail outlet that sells recorded music

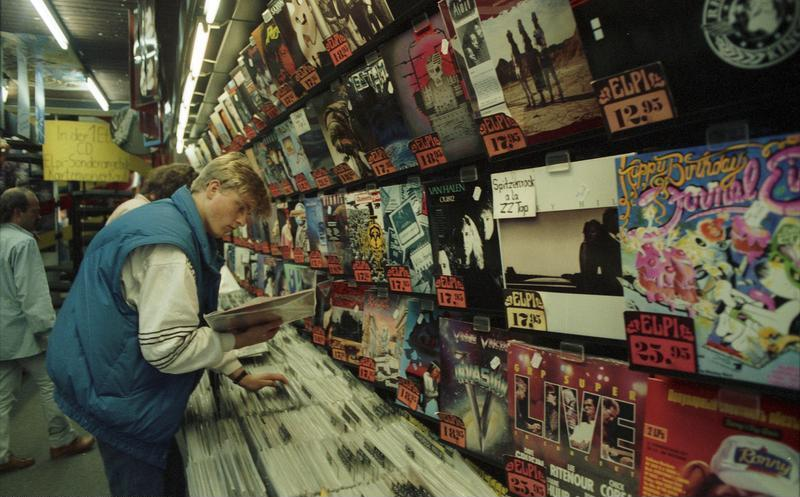
A West German record shop in 1988

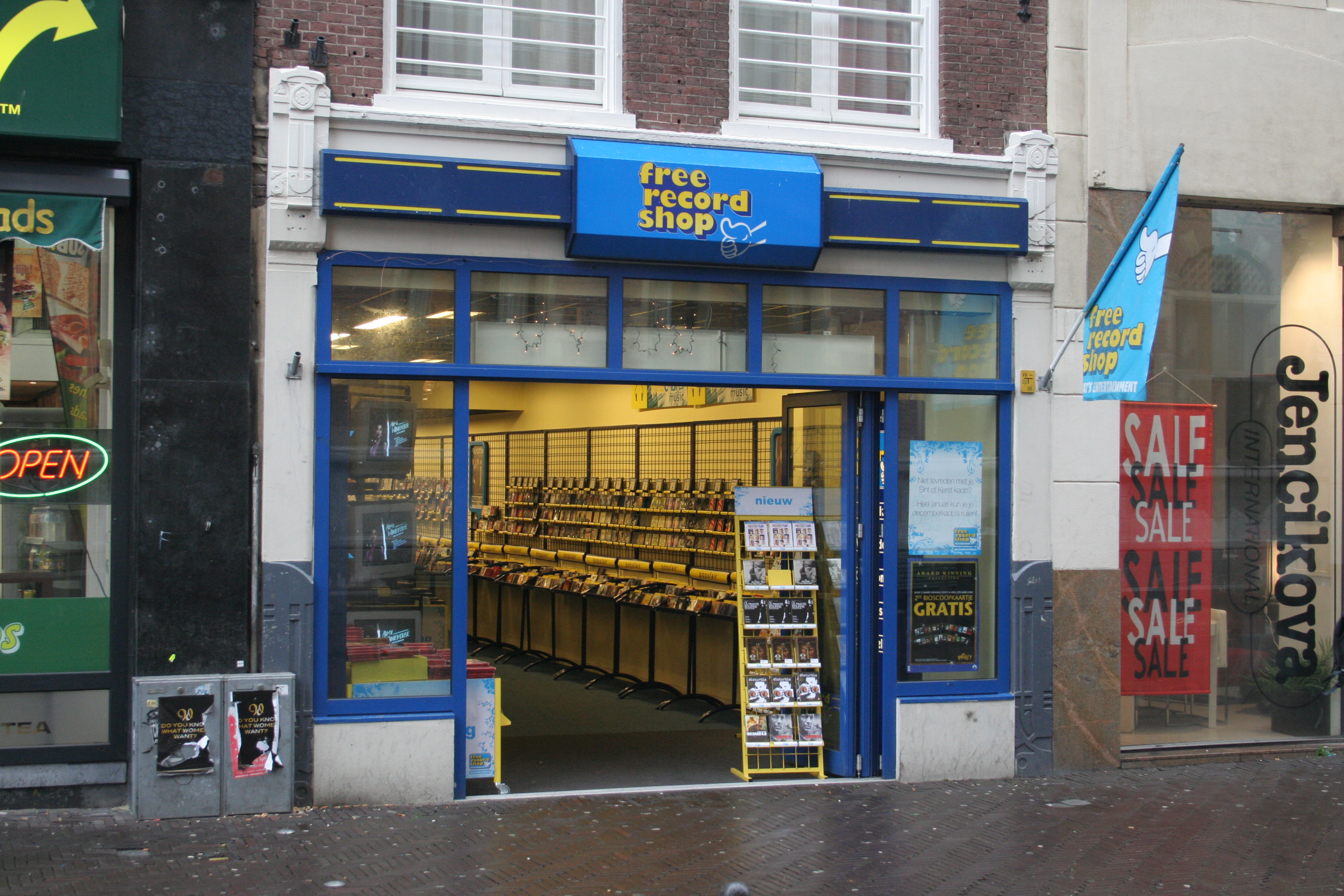
A record shop in The Hague, Netherlands in 2008

A record shop or record store is a retail outlet that sells recorded music. Per the name, in the late 19th century and the early 20th century, record shops only sold gramophone records. But over the course of the 20th century, record shops sold the new formats that were developed, such as eight track tapes, compact cassettes and compact discs (CDs). Today, in the 21st century, record stores mainly sell CDs, vinyl records and, in some cases, DVDs of movies, TV shows, cartoons and concerts. Some record stores also sell music-related items such as posters of bands or singers, related clothing items and even merchandise such as bags and coffee mugs.

Even when CDs became popular during the 1990s, people in English-speaking countries continued using the term "record shop" to describe a shop selling sound recordings. With the vinyl revival of the 21st century, often generating more income than CDs, the name is again accurate.

== History ==
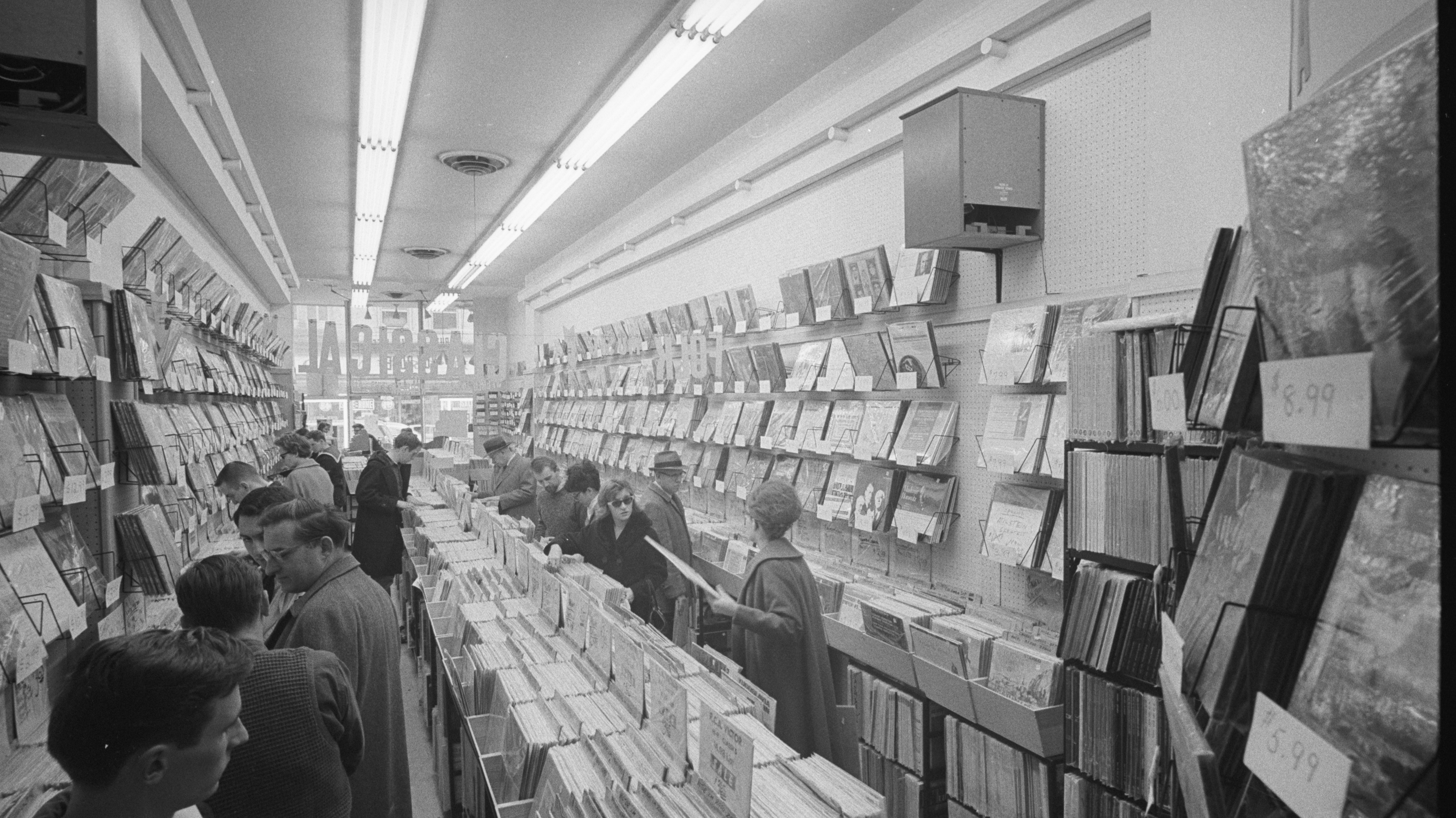
An American record store in 1963

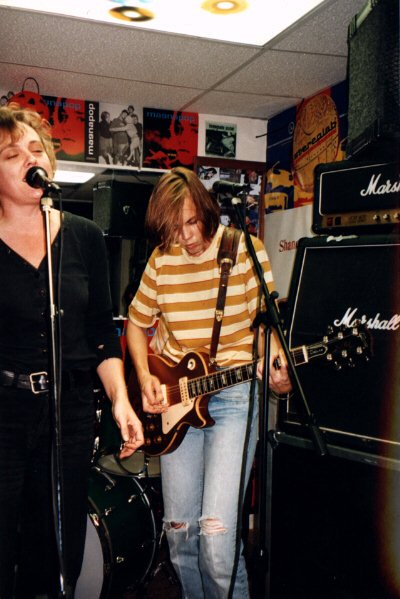
Record shops also host musical performances, especially on Record Store Day: Magnapop are pictured here playing at an American store in 1994, with flyers for their album Hot Boxing visible in the background

Spillers Records in Cardiff, Wales, founded in 1894 by Henry Spiller, is reputed to be the oldest record shop in the world. It originally specialised in the sale of phonographs, cylinders and shellac discs.

Shellac and then vinyl records were popular up to the 1990s, when CDs became the most popular form of recorded music. Soon, however, mail order and internet selling caused prices to fall, and with the advent of downloads and streaming, many record shops were forced to close. The vinyl revival has, however, increased income for record shops, and many new record shops and even chains of record shops have opened.

Major chains in the UK and North America that have closed in recent years are Our Price, Zavvi, The Wherehouse, Andy's Records, Music and Video Club and Media Play. HMV have closed all stores in North America and Ireland, although they are still present in the UK. Virgin Megastores have closed all stores in North America and Europe. Tower Records has closed all stores in North America except one store in Mexico. Rough Trade is, however, currently expanding, with two shops in London, one in Cambridge, one Megastore in New York and plans to further expand.

Current record shop chains in Europe are now HMV (UK), Tower Records (Ireland), Free Record shop (Luxembourg: complete stores, Netherlands: shop-in shop), Velvet Music, Plato, (both Netherlands) and Golden Discs (Ireland). Record shop chains still present in North America include Sunrise Records (Canada), and its subsidiary FYE (For Your Entertainment), which in turn owns the last two Sam Goody stores. Outside of Europe and North America, the current record store chains include Virgin Megastores, HMV and Tower Records.

The HMV Vault in Birmingham, England is now the world's largest record shop, opening its doors in October 2019. Before this, the former HMV in Oxford Street, London, England claimed to be the world's largest record store. The shop was originally opened in 1921 by the composer Sir Edward Elgar and had four floors of CDs, LPs, singles and DVDs. During the ‘60s, the in-store recording studio was used by Brian Epstein to record the Beatles' first demo. The revamped store was reopened in 2013 attended by many of the world's biggest stars including Paul McCartney, Robbie Williams and Elton John. The largest record shop in Ireland is Tower Records in Dublin, the largest in Asia is Tower Records in Shibuya, Tokyo and the largest in the United States is Amoeba Records in Los Angeles. The largest record shop in the Nordic countries is Bengans in Goteborg, Sweden, which opened in 1974.

In some countries, electronics stores and department store chains have very large, comprehensive CD departments which now also sell vinyl records. These include Saturn, Media Markt and Fnac (Europe) and El Corte Inglés (Spain). Saturn in Cologne, Germany claims to now have the world's largest selection of records. The world's largest store selling records, CDs and other related and non-related products is Saturn in Hamburg, Germany. This former department store is the world's largest electronic retailer with six floors selling consumer products related to music and electric appliances including record players.

Record stores played a vital role in African American communities for many decades. In the 1960s and 1970s, between 500 and 1,000 black-owned record stores operated in the American South, and probably twice as many in the United States as a whole. African American entrepreneurs embraced record stores as key vehicles for economic empowerment and critical public spaces for black consumers at a time that many black-owned businesses were closing amid desegregation.

== Modern era ==
=== United Kingdom ===
Prior to the 2000s, more record shops were privately run, independent businesses, meaning that prices could differ from town to town and store to store. In the 2000s, record shops are largely chain-owned and thus prices are fairly similar in different towns. In the United Kingdom the national chain style of selling records and tapes developed with Our Price, itself originally a small independent business founded in the early 1970s that expanded nationwide.

The current record store chains in the UK are HMV, Fopp, and Rough Trade. The enormous increase in sales of vinyl records in the 2000s has provided an opportunity for growth in some sectors. According to a recent study, Brighton, England has the highest number of record stores per 100,000 residents in the world.

=== United States ===
With the demise of chains such as Sam Goody (except for two stores) and Tower Records in the 2000s, there remained no national retail chains focused on sales of recorded music except for FYE. Music sales continued in dedicated sections of video stores (until their demise) and at big box retailers such as Best Buy, Walmart and Target. Most record retailers today are independent retailers.

=== Mongolia ===
In Ulaanbaatar, the capital city of Mongolia, there wasn't a record shop. In 2015 Batbold Bavuu put his collection of 3000 records up for sale in his shop. Before this store opened its doors, people in Mongolia had to travel 600 miles to Beijing in order to buy vinyl from a shop. Batbold Bavuu's collection is available for sale at his store Dund Gol.

=== Kenya ===
Among Nairobi's markets is a record shop operated by James Rugami, which stocks vinyl records of Kenyan Benga, Congolese rumba, and Swahili pop.

== Used market ==
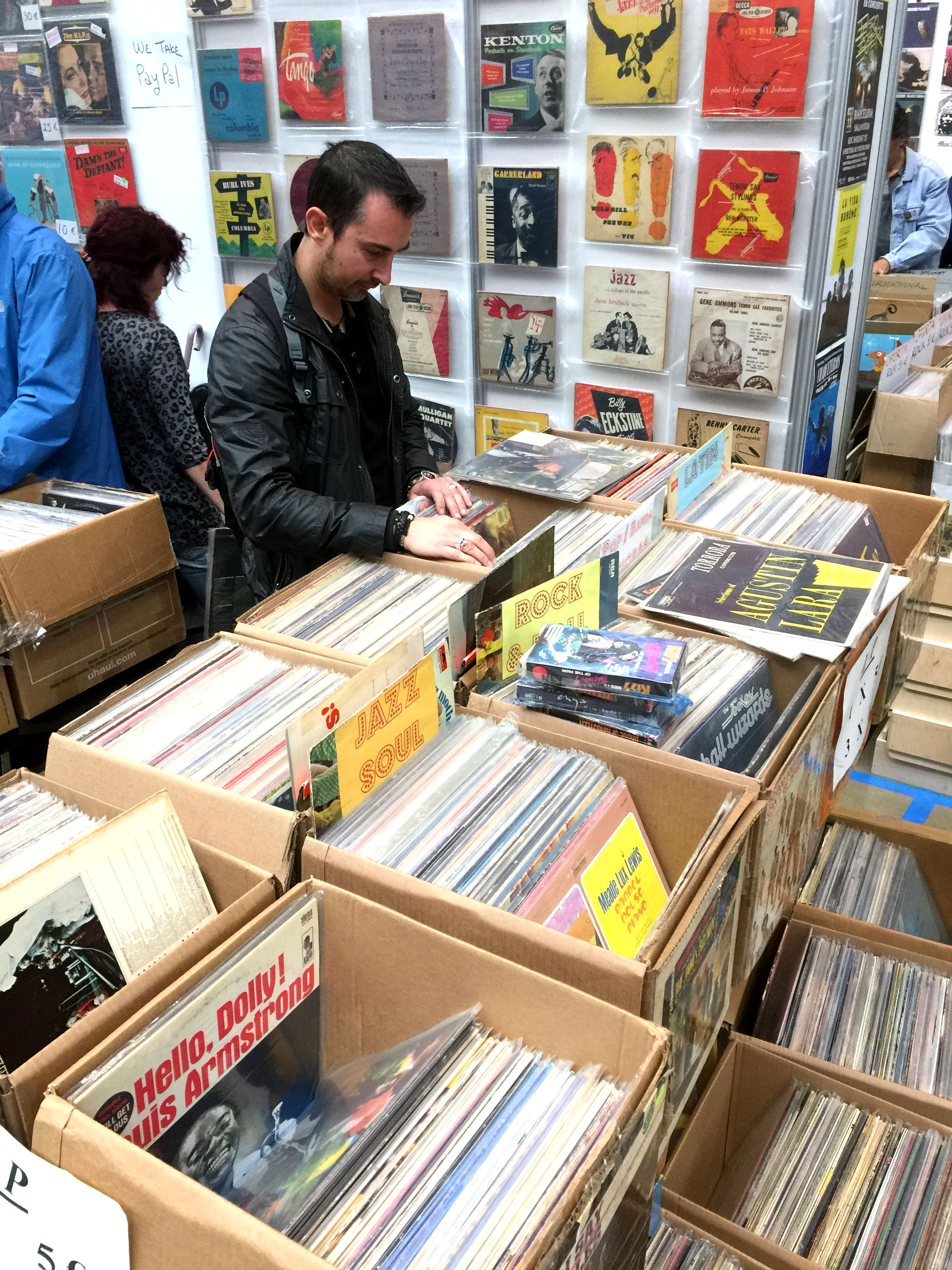
Secondhand record store in Spain (2016)

In addition to shops that sell new products, many record shops specialize in secondhand, vintage, or used collectible records, which they purchase from the public or other dealers, and sell for a profit. Some used record stores also sell used CDs and DVD movies. It is not uncommon for such shops to contain several items priced in the hundreds or thousands of US dollars (or local equivalent) due to their rarity, as well as items that are fairly common for much less. This type of record shop has also faced fierce competition from Internet sites like eBay and Discogs, where people can sell their own records and avoid "the middle man". Some pawnshops sell used CDs.

== Independent stores ==
Many customers prefer to buy vinyl from small, independent record stores with a larger selection than department stores. In many countries including the UK and the U.S., the specialty record store business is booming with hundreds opening from 2013 to 2016. The County of Los Angeles currently has more independent record stores than any other county in the U.S. with over 50 stores ranging from Amoeba Records in Hollywood (which bills itself as the "world's largest independent record store") to The Record Parlour, where patrons can purchase, produce and perform music.

In the United Kingdom, London has Flashback Records (a small chain), Honest Jon's in Portobello Market London amongst others. There is also the aforementioned Spillers Records in Cardiff, and Brighton has Resident Records. The Liverpool independent record store scene is one of the most densely populated in the country, the Liverpool city centre alone showcasing the likes of Jacaranda and Probe Records, as well as 81 Renshaw, Dead Air Records and Dig Vinyl, the last operating a second spot in West Kirby.

== See also ==
- List of largest recorded music markets
- Online music store
- Record Store Day
- Record sales
