= Life in Hell =

Comic strip

- Cover of Life in Hell No. 4, published in 1978
- Author: Matt Groening
- Current status/schedule: Ended
- Launch date: 1977
- End date: 2012
- Syndicate: Copley News Service
- Genre(s): Black comedy, gag-a-day, satire

Life in Hell was a comic strip by Matt Groening that was published weekly from 1977 to 2012. Its main characters include anthropomorphic rabbits and a gay couple. The comic covers a wide range of subjects, such as love, sex, work, and death, and explores themes of angst, social alienation, self-loathing, and fear of inevitable doom.

Groening presented a catalog of Life in Hell original art to Polly Platt, who purchased it as a gift for James L. Brooks. Brooks hired Groening to create animated shorts for The Tracey Ullman Show. Groening was unwilling to use his Life in Hell characters for the gig, instead creating the cast of characters based on his own family that would go on to feature in the animated sitcom, The Simpsons.

== History ==
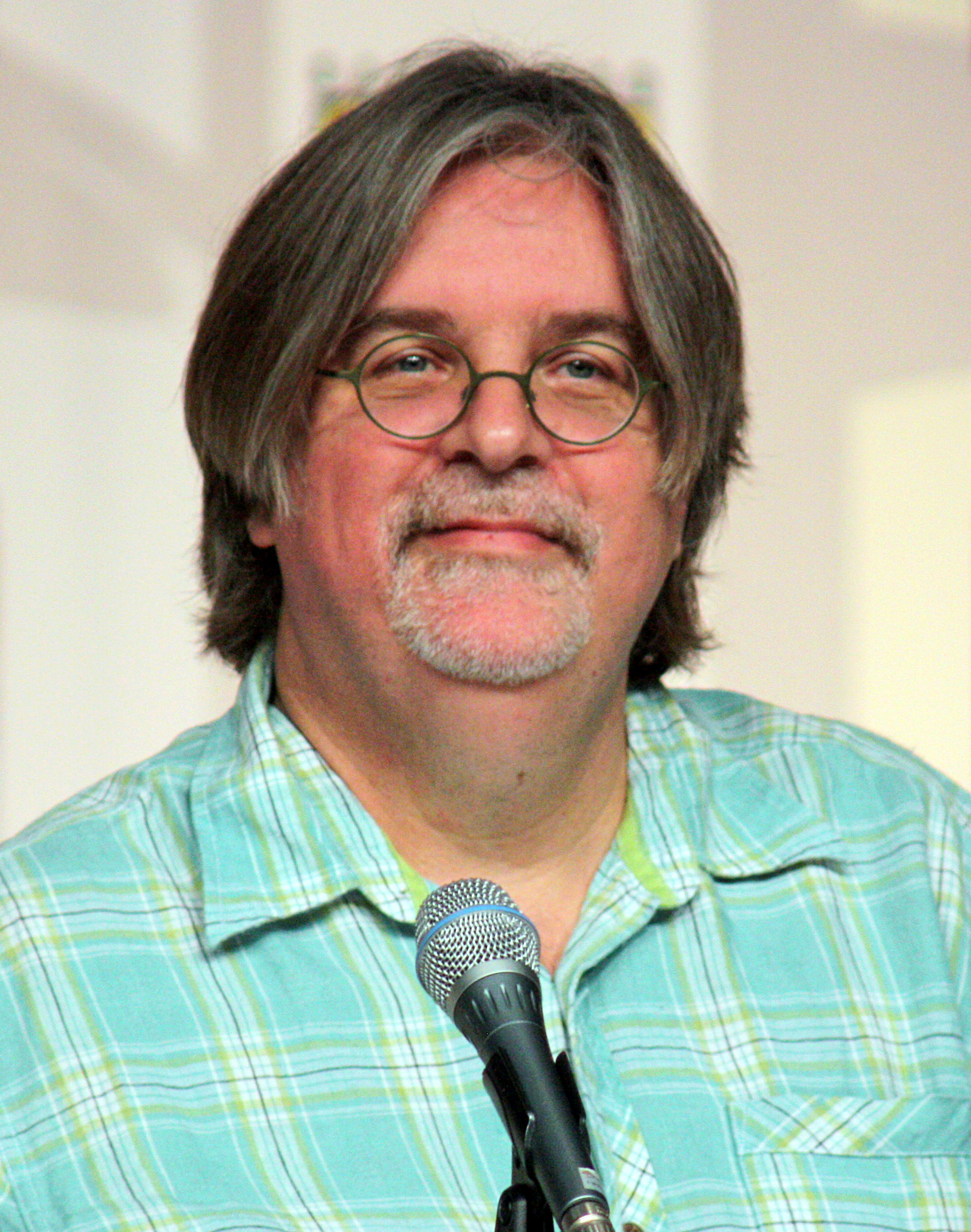
Matt Groening created Life in Hell to describe life in Los Angeles to his friends.

Life in Hell started in 1977 as a self-published comic book Groening used to describe life in Los Angeles to his friends. It was inspired by his move to the city that year; in an interview with Playboy, Groening commented on his arrival: "I got [to Los Angeles] on a Friday night in August; it was about a hundred and two degrees; my car broke down in the fast lane of the Hollywood Freeway while I was listening to a drunken DJ who was giving his last program on a local rock station and bitterly denouncing the station's management. And then I had a series of lousy jobs." In the comic book, Groening attacked what many young adults found repellent: school, work, and love. He described it as "every ex-campus protester's, every Boomer idealist's, conception of what adult existence in the '80s had turned out to be."

Groening photocopied and distributed the xeroxed book to friends, and also sold them for two dollars a copy at the punk corner of the record store in which he worked, Licorice Pizza on Sunset Boulevard. His books contained comic strips, comedy sketches, letters, and photo collages. The book's covers were humorous as well: the first issue saw Binky, a rabbit-humanoid character, standing in a cloud of smog and declaring, "What you see is what you breathe." Groening also worked other imagery into the covers, such as drawings from Jules Verne's books and a photo of his family's living room.

An editor from Wet magazine bought one of the magazines and liked it, and offered Groening a spot in the magazine; soon after, in 1978, Life in Hell debuted as a comic strip in the avant-garde Wet, to which Groening made his first professional cartoon sale. The first strip, entitled "Forbidden Words", appeared in the September/October issue. Popular in the underground, Life in Hell was picked up by the Los Angeles Reader (an alternative weekly newspaper where Groening also worked as a typesetter, editor, paste-up artist and music critic) in 1980, where it began appearing weekly. Then-publisher of the Reader Jane Levine said Groening arrived at editor-in-chief James Vowell's office one day, showing him his "silly cartoons with the rabbit with one ear." After Groening left, Vowell came out of his office saying, "This guy is gonna be famous someday."

The character designs of Akbar and Jeff were, in fact, failed attempts by Groening to draw Charlie Brown. In a 1999 interview, Groening said that he added Akbar and Jeff to the comic to appease a girlfriend early on in the comic. He used Binky and his girlfriend Sheba to mirror the arguments Groening himself had with this girlfriend. However, she grew irritated with Groening because she felt he was portraying her unfairly. The addition of the twin-like Akbar and Jeff was meant to act as a mask of anonymity to hide who was who in such arguments. According to Groening, however, she still told him, "You think you're Akbar, but you’re really Jeff."

In a 1991 interview about The Simpsons, Groening said that Life in Hell was done entirely by himself, describing the comic as "Matt Groening pure and simple," and explained that the strips were often weird or entirely different every week because of however he was feeling at the time of a strip's creation.

In November 1984, his new girlfriend (and co-worker at the Reader), Deborah Caplan, decided to publish a compilation of Groening's cartoons as a book entitled "Love is Hell". The book was an underground success, selling 22,000 copies in its first two printings. Caplan had already left her career in advertising sales at the Reader to manage the Life in Hell Cartoon Co./Acme Features Syndicate full time, which managed syndication and merchandising for Groening's Life in Hell cartoons. The gift line included t-shirts, mugs, calendars, and greeting cards. With Caplan's management and promotional talents his cartoon went from being published in 11 free weeklies to over 250 papers nationwide and the product line began to sell very well nationwide. She also represented his work to Paper Moon Company where he and Steve Vance produced a popular line of greeting cards repurposing old movie posters and Fake magazines such as "Lonely Tyrant: The magazine for abusive bosses whose employees hate their guts". Stories inside include, "The fine art of the meaningless memo". In 1986, after Groening and Caplan had married, they published Work is Hell and two calendars, one with cartoonist Lynda Barry. Matt's books soon drew the attention of Pantheon/Randomhouse, which obtained the rights to distribute the books. In 1989, Life in Hell Cartoon Co./Acme closed its doors.

In 1984, Deborah was asked to bring a portfolio of Matt's original art to Fox Studios. Polly Platt wanted to select one for her friend's birthday. That friend launched Matt into television. Hollywood producer James L. Brooks, received the strip—"The Los Angeles Way of Death" from 1982. In 1985, Brooks contacted Groening with the proposition of developing a series of short animated skits, called "bumpers", for The Tracey Ullman Show. Groening opted to not use the Life in Hell characters for the shorts. Instead, Groening created an entirely new batch of characters: the Simpsons.

As television began to place more demands on his time, Groening came to almost exclusively feature single-panel strips or 16-panel grids in which Akbar and Jeff exchange terse jabs. Television had also made the strip "safe enough for a number of newspapers to print", according to Groening, who said he had not "toned the strip down at all, other than no longer using profanity" as a concession to the daily papers that carried the strip (the alternative weeklies that ran his strip didn't have these standards).

Groening registered the eponymous domain mattgroening.com on December 7, 1998, ostensibly to publish Life in Hell online; although Groening remarked in 2003 that he planned to eventually add content to the site, nothing substantial has ever been posted to it. An index page consisting of an image of Binky captioned "This site is under construction" was in place from 2001 through 2011; since then, the site has simply consisted of generic parked domain landing pages.

Groening decided in 2007, in the wake of the 2006 United States elections, to write "Life Is Swell" above the comic instead of "Life in Hell". Though Groening had previously stated that he would never give up the comic strip, in 2009 he indicated that due to troubling times for print newspapers and constant involvement with The Simpsons and Futurama, he would likely one day drop the strip. Three years later, Groening announced the strip's conclusion and the final new strip ran on June 16, 2012. The final strip shows Akbar or Jeff dancing naked, while the other tells him to stop. At the end of the strip he gives up and dances along with him, saying "Well, I tried."

== Format ==
The strip was published in a perfect square, unlike most Sunday strips, which are published in rectangles. Various formats were used for different strip topics. When Akbar and Jeff were discussing love, Groening would use four rows of boxes, each row with four in it. Other strips had one large panel. This is based on the way Lynda Barry made comics when they were in college and the way it was published originally in the Reader. Atop each strip is the handwritten title "Life in Hell," "Copyright Matt Groening," and the year it was made. Sometimes the title would be stylized in different fonts, with "This is your" above "Life in Hell" or with alternate spellings of Groening's name. In the strip "Why men growl," he wrote his name as Matt "Grrrrroening." In "Are you Easily Provoked?" he misspelled his name three times until getting it right and writing "godamnit" underneath. If the strip is cowritten, Groening writes the contributor's name(s) underneath his. Groening sometimes put where he was when he was making the strip, such as Chicago or Portland, underneath his name.

== Characters ==
- Binky is a stressed and thus "normal" rabbit and star of the cartoon. He usually embodies dread and alienation. Binky is usually stuck in a dead end job, has a bad apartment and regularly sees a therapist. Binky is usually full of wise old sayings.
- Sheba is Binky's estranged girlfriend. Her character design is "basically Binky in drag". Binky and Sheba met at a coffee shop in a 1981 storyline, and are often used as a generic couple whenever Groening needs one.
- Bongo is Binky's illegitimate son, the product of a drunken night of "jungle passion". He was introduced in a 1983 storyline in which his mother, Hulga, left him with Binky so she could seek her fortune in New York. Bongo's defining physical attribute is his one ear, which Groening admits is solely so that the casual viewer can tell him apart from Binky. Bongo made an appearance in the Futurama episode "Xmas Story", where he is seen being sold in a pet shop. He also appeared in The Simpsons episode "Treehouse of Horror XII" as one of the rabbits that Homer catches in the trap. He appears in The Simpsons again in another episode as a plush toy in Lisa's room, though he is called Madam Bunny. He is shown as a plush toy in "The Fool Monty" where Mr. Burns is eating it in Bart's closet. He has a cameo in "Simpsorama" as one of the rabbit-like creatures rampaging New New York, where he writes on a wall "Crossovers are hell".
- Akbar & Jeff are described in various strips and interviews as "either brothers or lovers – or both. Whatever offends you most, that’s what they are". In one interview, Groening says they are gay. They have large noses and wear fezzes and Charlie Brown-like striped shirts. They have run numerous businesses over the years, including Akbar & Jeff's Tofu Hut, Akbar & Jeff's Earthquake T-shirt Hut, and Akbar & Jeff's Bootleg "Akbar & Jeff" T-shirt Hut. Like Binky and Sheba, Akbar and Jeff are often used as a generic couple when needed. According to Groening, "the reason why I draw a strip with Akbar and Jeff instead of Binky and Sheba is that I figure that no one can accuse me of trying to score points against men or women if the characters are identical." They have been given cameo appearances in The Simpsons, such as during "Homer's Triple Bypass", where Homer uses finger puppets resembling the characters to describe his surgery to Bart and Lisa.
- Matt Groening appears in the strip as a bearded, bespectacled rabbit. He is also sometimes represented as Binky.
- Will and Abe are Matt Groening's two sons, represented in rabbit form. They usually talk about vampires, zombies, and other child-fantasy topics.
- Snarla, a cat, is Bongo's classmate and love interest. She bears a resemblance to Lisa Simpson.
- Bart Simpson, has never spoken—except when he uttered his former catch phrase "Don't have a cow, man!" in a "forbidden words" strip—but is seen in the background of a number of strips.
- Mr. Simpson is Binky's anthropomorphic dog boss at his job. His name predates The Simpsons.
- Gooey, Screwy, and Ratatouille are Akbar and/or Jeff's triplet nephews. The names are an obvious spoof of the Disney characters Huey, Dewey and Louie (Donald Duck's nephews).

== Recurring jokes and situations ==
- The X types of Y: The 9 types of college teachers, the 81 types of high school students, the 16 types of brothers, the 9 types of relationships.
- How-To Guides: Examples include "So You Want to Be an Unrecognized Genius", "How to Be a Clever Film Critic", and "How to Get into the College of Your Choice".
- Miniseries – A series of strips focusing on a particular theme in a mock textbook manner, such as "School is Hell" and "Love is Hell", both of which have been collected in their entirety in book form.
- Akbar & Jeff discussing their relationship – Arguably the most common set-up. A 1992 strip, "The Dart Game of Love", was prefaced with "I hope this cartoon pleases you gripers who whined about all those Akbar & Jeff strips where they stared at each other."
- Binky attempting to meditate
- Advertisements for disreputable businesses run by Akbar & Jeff such as "Akbar & Jeff's Lucky Psychic Hut".
- Bongo locked in a detention room or orphanage - Usually, with 1 or 2 pairs of eyes watching him.
- Bongo unsatisfied with the huge assortment of presents he has received on Christmas morning
- Shadow rabbit – Binky's looming shadow towers over Bongo, who has clearly committed a crime despite his assurances to the contrary. Several of Bongo's excuses parodied those of politicians, such as "Mistakes were made". Occasionally there would also be a shadow Akbar & Jeff looming over Bongo and their nephews, or Binky looming over Bongo, Jeff, and Akbar, who are pointing fingers at each other. One comic showed Bongo's shadow looming over Binky.
- Pledge of Allegiance: Bongo's class is forced to recite the Pledge of Allegiance. Bongo intentionally butchers the Pledge, usually criticizing the government in the process ("and to the Republicans which I can't stand"). One strip, released after the death of musician Frank Zappa in 1993, has Bongo replacing most of the words of the Pledge with names of Zappa albums ("With yellow sharks and hot rats for all"). The comic would always end with Bongo's teacher angrily leering at him, and often Bongo would be tied to his desk and gagged as punishment.
- Forbidden Words – An annual compilation of buzzwords used over the past year that Groening has deemed "forbidden". This topic was the first ever comic by Groening, published in 1980. These also appear in Simpsons annuals.
- "How to draw Binky" - Often comedic ways on how to draw Binky, usually one of which is drawing randomly with your eyes closed.

== Merchandise and advertising ==
After Deborah Caplan published Love Is Hell in 1984, she subsequently published Work Is Hell, two calendars, one in collaboration with cartoonist Lynda Barry, a line of postcards and notecards derived from his best cartoon strips, and t-shirts, sweatshirts, coffee mugs and posters. Deborah marketed the product line nationally and syndicated his strip to hundreds of alternative newsweeklies under the name Acme Features Syndicate. They were married in 1986 where she became Deborah Caplan Groening. The books caught the attention of Pantheon/Randomhouse who wanted to expand the market for his books to include bookstores nationwide while The Life in Hell Cartoon Co. and Acme Features Syndicate reserved the right to continue to sell the books to hip novelty and comic book stores along with the line of novelty items the couple had produced over the previous 5 years and also by mail order to their fans through and a short-lived newsletter called the "Life in Hell Times. She also produced a mail order catalog, The Melrose Catalog, that was sent to their growing fan list. Their cottage industry went gang busters when she made a deal with his syndicated papers to allow her to place free weekly ads to promote their product line in the papers. In the late 1980s, Groening drew several print advertisements for Apple Computer using characters from the Life in Hell comic strips.

In 1989, after the birth of their first son, Homer Will Groening, Deborah and Matt decided to end the Life in Hell Cartoon Co. Deborah wanted to focus on motherhood and to prepare for her new career as a psychotherapist and founder of the non-profit, Well Baby Center, while Matt was busy launching his career in television. Many more details on their life together and his rise to fame is expected to be found in her new memoir, Marginalized...My Path to Well Baby Center, expected to be published next year.

At the 2005 Comic-Con in San Diego, a series of deluxe Life in Hell vinyl figurines manufactured by CritterBox Toys was announced. However, these figures were never released.

Binky and Bongo appear as background and enemy characters in the Simpsons arcade video game (coin-op).

=== Books ===
- 1984 – Love Is Hell – (ISBN 0-394-74454-3)
- 1986 – Work Is Hell – (ISBN 0-394-74864-6)
- 1987 – School Is Hell – (ISBN 0-394-75091-8)
- 1988 – Box Full of Hell – (ISBN 0-679-72111-8)
- 1988 – Childhood Is Hell – (ISBN 0-679-72055-3)
- 1989 – Greetings from Hell – (ISBN 0-679-72678-0)
- 1989 – Akbar and Jeff's Guide to Life – (ISBN 0-679-72680-2)
- 1990 – The Big Book of Hell – (ISBN 0-679-72759-0)
- 1991 – With Love From Hell – (ISBN 0-06-096583-5)
- 1991 – How to Go to Hell – (ISBN 0-06-096879-6)
- 1992 – The Road to Hell – (ISBN 0-06-096950-4)
- 1994 – Binky's Guide to Love – (ISBN 0-06-095078-1)
- 1994 – Love Is Hell: Special Ultra Jumbo 10th Anniversary Edition – (ISBN 0-679-75665-5)
- 1997 – The Huge Book of Hell – (ISBN 0-14-026310-1)
- 2007 – Will and Abe's Guide to the Universe – (ISBN 0-06-134037-5)
