= Peaches Records and Tapes =

Bygone chain of record superstores

- Industry: Music
- Founded: 1975, United States
- Founder: Tom Heiman
- Defunct: 1981
- Key people: Tom Heiman

Peaches Records & Tapes, Inc., was a Los Angeles-based national retail chain of record superstores, some as large as 15,000 square feet. The chain became a subsidiary of the Nehi Record Distributing Corporation. Tom Heiman (né Thomas Michael Heiman; born 1941) founded Peaches in 1963 and went on to become president of Nehi. At its peak, Peaches had 50 stores in 22 cities with over 2,000 employees. In June 1981, Peaches filed a petition for bankruptcy under Chapter 11 citing $20 million in debt (equivalent to $177 in 2025) for its 35 stores coast to coast, owed to Citibank and six different record distributors.

== History ==
Peaches was known for its vast selection with many locations in buildings the size of a typical grocery store. Stores were also known for autograph signing events, huge reproductions of the album covers of the latest releases on the side of its buildings and for selling records from wooden crates with the chain's colorful fruit-crate style logo on the side. Stores reportedly stocked $500,000 worth of inventory.

Tom Heiman opened the first store on Hollywood Boulevard in Los Angeles in 1975 and soon opened another in Atlanta in 1975. The company's 39th store was opened in Chicago on December 3, 1980.

Emulating the tradition at Grauman's Chinese Theatre, some stores invited visiting artists to set their handprints in cement on the sidewalk outside. The prints, including The Allman Brothers, ZZ Top, Dolly Parton, The Beach Boys, Willie Nelson, The Kinks and others were destroyed in 1981 when that store closed following the company's bankruptcy. Handprints by artists such as Pat Metheny, 38 Special, Hank Williams Jr. and Ronnie Van Zant of Lynyrd Skynyrd remain outside the former location in Tulsa, Oklahoma.

The lone remaining location is in New Orleans, one of eight before bankruptcy. That location moved to a former Woolworth store and continues to maintain the lunch counter there.
