= Musicland =

American entertainment company

The Musicland Group, Inc.
- Type: Private
- Industry: Retail
- Founded: 1955
- Defunct: 2006
- Fate: Chapter 11 bankruptcy Liquidation
- Successor: Trans World Entertainment (corporate); FYE (retail chains)
- Parent: Best Buy (2001–2003); Sun Capital Partners (2003–2006)
- Subsidiaries: Sam Goody; Suncoast Motion Picture Company; Media Play
- Website: musicland.com at the Wayback Machine (archived August 4, 2004)

The Musicland Group, Inc. was an American retail company that operated the Musicland, Sam Goody, Suncoast Motion Picture Company, Media Play, On Cue, and Discount Records chains of specialty retail stores. The Musicland Group was purchased by Best Buy in 2001 at the height of Musicland's success, which ultimately led to its demise. Jack Eugster was the CEO of The Musicland Group, from 1980, until February 2001. Its headquarters were in Minnetonka, Minnesota.

== History ==
The first Musicland store was opened in 1955 in Minneapolis by Grover Cleveland Sayre II, where the company continued to be headquartered for the remainder of its history, by Heilicher Brothers, a Minneapolis-based regional record distributor and owner of the Soma Records label. In 1964 Musicland merged with JL Marsh and in 1968 with Pickwick International. In 1977, American Can Company purchased Pickwick International and in 1978 purchased the Sam Goody chain of record stores, which had a long history going back to 1951 in New York. Shortly after, Musicland began converting the majority of its stores to the Sam Goody brand name, although some locations did retain the Musicland name into the early 2000s.

In 1997, the Musicland Group converted the remaining Musicland stores to the Sam Goody brand.

The company expanded rapidly during the mall boom of the 1980s and continued to grow into the nineties, enjoying a long tenure as the United States' largest specialty retailer of entertainment products. Most of its Sam Goody stores were located in shopping malls. The company helped launch the careers of many prominent artists, including Michael Jackson. In 1986, the first Suncoast Motion Picture Company store was opened as Paramount Pictures (the name change would come in 1988.) This store concept specialized in movies and movie memorabilia, also located in shopping malls.

In 1992, Musicland launched a major initiative with the rollout of its big-box Media Play concept, opening the first store in Rockford, Illinois. Media Play was a chain of retail superstores that sold movies on video, laserdiscs, music, electronics, video games, books, toys, and games in the United States. Each store essentially contained a book store, a movie store, a music store, and a video game store under one roof. At their height, they operated 72 stores in 19 states with 2,000 employees. Hundreds of stores were planned, but only 89 ever opened. Most Media Play stores were freestanding, with an average size of 45,000 square feet (4,200 m^{2}). During the same period, the company also developed a small market Media Play by opening On Cue stores across the country as well. These "small town Media Plays" also sold Music, Books and Movies, as well as musical instruments and gave small towns that were not near a major metro a place for great selection.

In 2001, Musicland was acquired by Best Buy. as part of its initiative to diversify its retail holdings to reach a larger demographic with its consumer electronics and entertainment products. By then, Musicland numbered over 1300 stores. Their intention was to transform Sam Goody into a destination for young people looking for hip electronics. They launched a major remerchandising campaign and converted Musicland's On Cue concept of rural stores to the Sam Goody brand, reducing its position in books and moving more into video games and DVD. Many Musicland employees, particularly management, were not happy at all with the Best Buy acquisition or their business model and tactics.

As part of a 2002 settlement with 41 states over CD price fixing, Musicland, along with retailers Tower Records and Trans World Entertainment, agreed to pay a $3 million (~$5.13 million in 2025) fine. It is estimated that between 1995 and 2000 customers were overcharged by nearly $500 million and up to $5 per album.

=== Decline and bankruptcy ===
Best Buy failed to generate the results they were looking for with Musicland, losing $85 million (~$145 million in 2025) in 2002. Best Buy admitted mall based retail was a different business concept from their Best Buy stores, and that they had failed at properly running The Musicland Group. As a result, they put the company up for sale and were likely just weeks away from liquidating the entire chain when they found a buyer in Sun Capital Partners of Boca Raton, Florida. Sun Capital acquired the company in a cash-free transaction in exchange for acquiring Musicland's debt and leases.

Sun Capital attempted to get the company back to basics, but ultimately the dual pressure of internet downloading and big box competition proved too much and in December 2005 Sun Capital announced the closure of all remaining Media Play stores. The now Sun Capital owned Musicland Group filed for Chapter 11 bankruptcy in January 2006, and in February announced the closing of 226 Sam Goody and 115 Suncoast Motion Picture Company stores, and all Media Play locations.

In March 2006, Trans World Entertainment announced the purchase of Musicland's remaining 400 Sam Goody and Suncoast stores from Sun Capital, along with their websites. Trans World kept 345 of those stores open and closed 55. Transworld began converting the remaining Sam Goody mall stores to FYE, their signature retail brand, but chose to keep the Suncoast Motion Picture Co. name on about 170 stores.
