= Sam Goody =

Entertainment retailer

- Logo used since 1995
- Type: Subsidiary
- Industry: Retail
- Founded: 1951; 75 years ago
- Founder: Sam "Goody" Gutowitz
- Headquarters: Minneapolis, Minnesota, U.S.
- Number of locations: 1 (2025)
- Owner: Doug Putman
- Parent: Musicland (1976–2006); Trans World Entertainment (2006–2020); FYE (2020–present)

Sam Goody is an American music and entertainment retailer, founded in New York City in 1951, named after its founder Sam "Goody" Gutowitz.

In 1976, the chain was purchased by Musicland. From 1990 to 1999, the chain traded in the United Kingdom. In 2006, Trans World Entertainment (parent of FYE) purchased Sam Goody from the administration of Musicland, and between 2007 and 2008, converted most of the Sam Goody stores to FYE stores.

As of November 2025, there is only one Sam Goody store left within the United States – in the Rogue Valley Mall in Medford, Oregon.

== History ==
Founder Sam "Goody" Gutowitz

Sam "Goody" Gutowitz (1904–1991) of New York City opened a small record store on 9th Avenue shortly after the advent of vinyl long-playing records (LPs) in the late 1940s. Although he did some retail business from his main store on 49th Street, most of his volume was in mail-order sales at discount prices, of which he was a pioneer. He became something of a folk hero among penniless college students as the first successful large-scale LP discounter.

Later, the Sam Goody name was applied to a chain of record stores established in 1951 by Gutowitz. In 1959, a group of creditors took over the company to collect $2.4 million in debts (equivalent to $20 million in 2024‍).

Sam Goody logo (c. 1950–1980)

In 1978, the company was acquired by the American Can Company (later renamed Primerica), the owners of Minneapolis-based Musicland, Goody's rival. Sam Goody continued to grow through both acquisitions and organic growth, including the launch of its website. The stores averaged 4,600 square feet (430 m^{2}) but varied in size from 1,000 to 30,000 sq ft (90 to 3,000 m^{2}). The Musicland Group was once the largest music retailer in the United States, operating at its peak more than 1300 stores, over 800 of them Sam Goody's, and earning over $2 billion in annual revenue.

In 1986, Sam Goody's corporate parent Musicland purchased the 34-store Southern California-based Licorice Pizza chain and 26 other record stores from Record Bar for $13 million (equivalent to $31 million in 2024‍). The Licorice Pizza stores were rebranded as Sam Goody the following year.

=== Acquisition and demise ===
Best Buy attempted to diversify its retail holdings by purchasing Musicland in 2001, only to sell it two years later. In 2002, Best Buy decided to consolidate some of the acquired stores by converting On Cue stores to the Sam Goody brand.

In March 2006, Trans World Entertainment, which had been acquiring their competitors for several years, announced the purchase of 400 Sam Goody and Suncoast stores. Trans World kept 345 of the stores open and closed 55. In late 2006, Trans World began changing the names of mall-based Sam Goody stores to f.y.e., the company's signature retail store. Trans World retained the Suncoast Motion Picture Co. name on about 170 stores.

Trans World announced their intention to focus on the f.y.e. brand and convert all Sam Goody stores to f.y.e stores in the future. By February 2009, Trans World had removed the Sam Goody brand from its corporate website. They kept a large store in San Diego branded Sam Goody due to the cost of changing the signs until late 2012.

By late 2015, Trans World had an operational Sam Goody store in the newly-renovated Centre of Tallahassee in Tallahassee, Florida. The last recorded instance of this store was in an Internet Archive snapshot of the Centre of Tallahassee website from April 4, 2016, only to disappear by April 30.

In February 2020, Trans World sold Sam Goody's parent FYE to Sunrise Records for $11 million (equivalent to $13 million in 2024‍).

== List of international operations ==
=== United Kingdom (1990–1999) ===
In 1990, Sam Goody entered the UK market and established a presence in a number of English towns, such as Milton Keynes, Weston-super-Mare and Stockport, with a "deep catalogue" retail format that included a large amount of "recurrent" music albums and videos. However, whereas this format might have been successful in the United States in the 1980s and early 1990s, in the United Kingdom it came under pressure from a range of price led and established retailers. By 1999, Sam Goody had exited the UK, selling its stores off to rival retailers. At the height of the chain's UK presence, there were 22 stores; only 14 remained when the company exited the country.
