= Suncoast Motion Picture Company =

American retail company

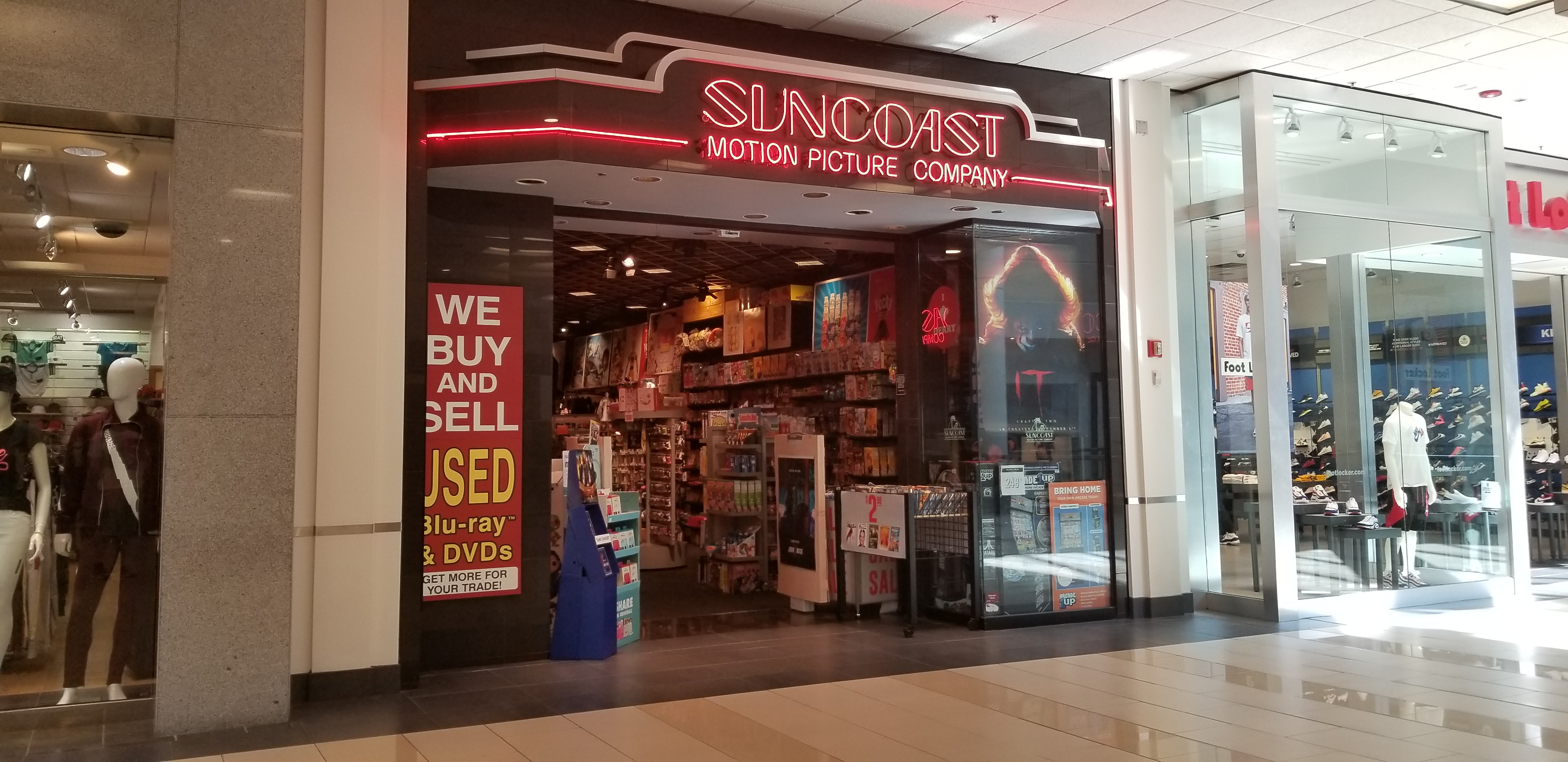
- Location at Monmouth Mall, Eatontown, NJ (This location is now permanently closed)
- Formerly: Paramount Pictures (1986–1988)
- Type: Subsidiary
- Industry: Retail
- Founded: 1986
- Headquarters: Roseville, Minnesota
- Number of locations: 2 (as of March 2025)
- Products: Betamax, VHS, Laserdisc, DVD, Blu-ray, CD
- Parent: Paramount Pictures (1986-1988); Musicland (1986–2006); Trans World Entertainment (2006–2020); FYE (2020–present)
- Website: suncoast.com at the Wayback Machine (archived November 30, 2002)

Suncoast Motion Picture Company (Suncoast) is an American chain of retail stores specializing in new and used physical media, primarily CDs, DVDs, Blu-rays, and vinyl records, as well as collectibles.

Suncoast was initially a subsidiary of Musicland before being purchased by Transworld Entertainment. After the purchase most stores were stocked like its sister chain FYE. Transworld entertainment was purchased by Sunrise Records in 2020 making Suncoast a subsidiary of it.

As of 2025, only two stores remain in the chain. One is in Jacksonville, North Carolina at the Jacksonville Mall. The second store, which is a combination of both an FYE and a Suncoast Motion picture company store, remains in Beavercreek, Ohio in The Mall at Fairfield Commons.

== History ==
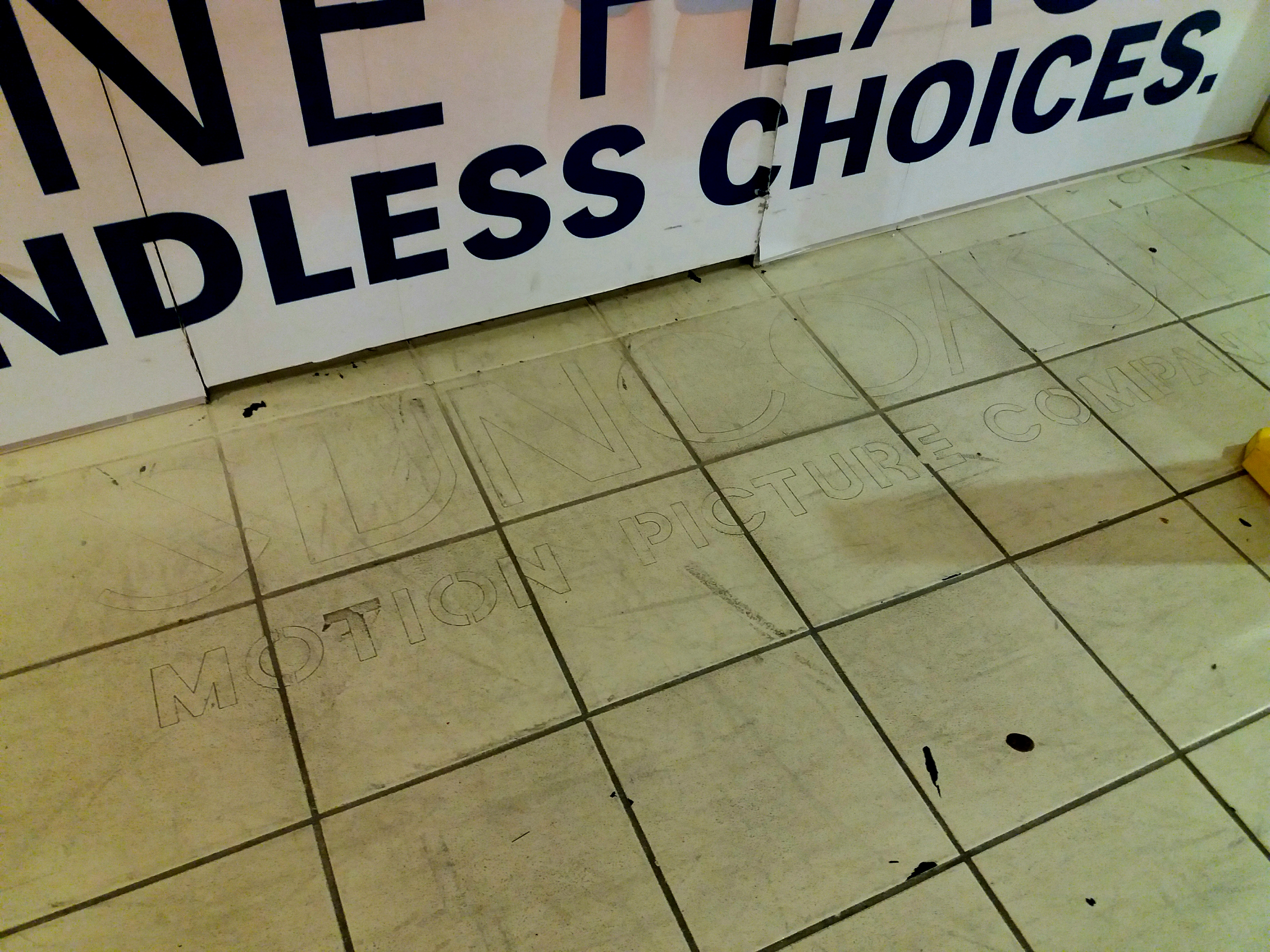
A dirty label scar from a Suncoast on the floor in front of a vacant store inside the Hamilton Mall, Mays Landing, NJ

The first Suncoast store opened in Roseville, Minnesota, in 1986 as Paramount Pictures. This was a joint venture between the Paramount movie studio and Musicland, which at the time was one of the largest music and video retailers in the United States. Once Paramount pulled out of the joint venture, Musicland changed the store’s name to Suncoast Motion Picture Company in 1988.

In 1999, Musicland launched websites for Suncoast, Sam Goody, Media Play, and Oncue.

In 2001, Best Buy purchased their then–parent company, Musicland, for $685 million.

In January 2003, Best Buy closed 20 Suncoast stores as part of a larger closing that included 90 Sam Goody stores.

Later that year in June 2003, Sun Capital Partners assumed Musicland's liabilities from Best Buy.

In January 2006, The Musicland Group filed for Chapter 11 bankruptcy in the United States Bankruptcy Court for the Southern District of New York; store closures during the bankruptcy included 80 Suncoast stores

In late March 2006, Trans World Entertainment Corp. completed the purchase of nearly all of the assets of Musicland Holding Corporation for $104.2 million in cash and $18.1 million in assumed liabilities. TWEC retained the Suncoast name on around 170 stores after acquisition.

However, on December 26, 2009, it announced the closure of 150 Suncoast stores nationwide.

In mid-2023, the Suncoast location at Westroads Mall in Omaha, Nebraska closed. There is only one full line Suncoast Motion Picture Company store open, in Jacksonville, North Carolina. A second, which is a combination of both an FYE and a Suncoast Motion picture company store, remains in Beavercreek, Ohio in The Mall at Fairfield Commons.
