= FYE =

American chain of entertainment retail stores

2428392, Inc.
- Logo as of 2017
- Trade name: FYE
- Industry: Retail
- Founded: 1993; 33 years ago (as f.y.e.); Trumbull, Connecticut, U.S.
- Headquarters: Albany, New York, US
- Number of locations: 130 (as of August 2026) (1 Sam Goody, 2 Suncoast)
- Products: CDs, vinyl records, Ultra HD Blu-ray, Blu-ray 3D, Blu-ray/DVDs, electronics, video games, merchandise, candy
- Parent: Trans World Entertainment (1993–2020); Sunrise Records (2020–present)
- Subsidiaries: Sam Goody (2020–present); Suncoast Motion Picture Company (2020–present); Coconuts Music & Movies (2020–present)
- Website: fye.com

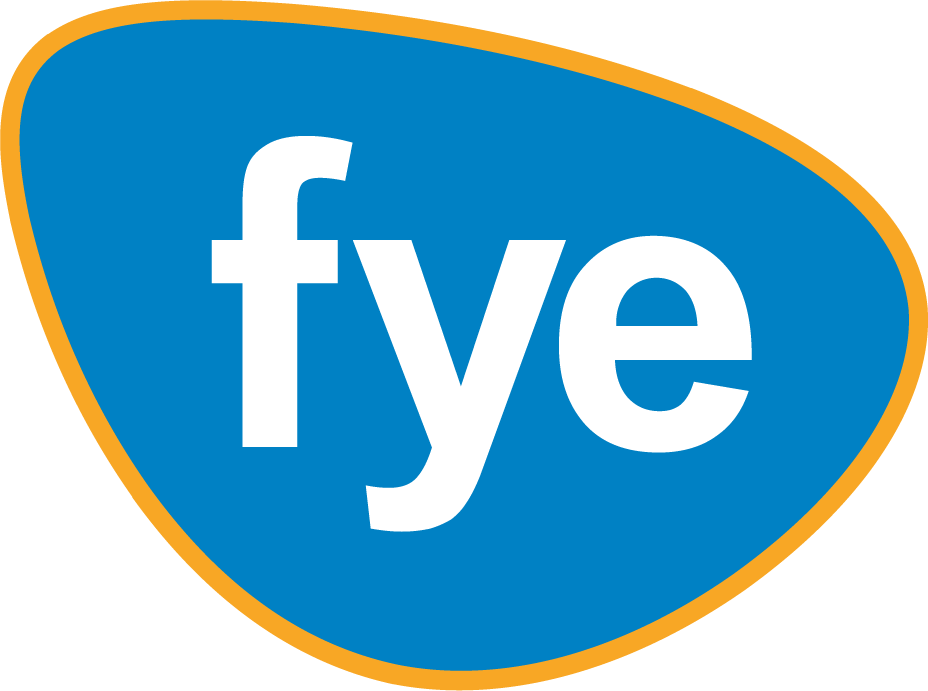
Logo used from 2001 to 2017

2428392, Inc. (trading as FYE) is an American music and entertainment retailer, founded in Trumbull, Connecticut in 1993. The company's initialism represents For Your Entertainment, and mainly operates in shopping mall destinations.

The chain expanded significantly in the late 1990s, first by acquiring and rebranding the Camelot and Spec's Music chains. In 2006, FYE's parent company, Trans World Entertainment, acquired Musicland's assets from bankruptcy, which included Sam Goody, Suncoast Motion Picture Company and Media Play, with most of these stores either rebranded as FYE, or closed.

In January 2020, Trans World sold FYE to Doug Putman, who at the time owned Sunrise Records in Canada and HMV in the UK. As of March 2026, FYE operates two stores trading as Suncoast, and one as Sam Goody.

== History ==
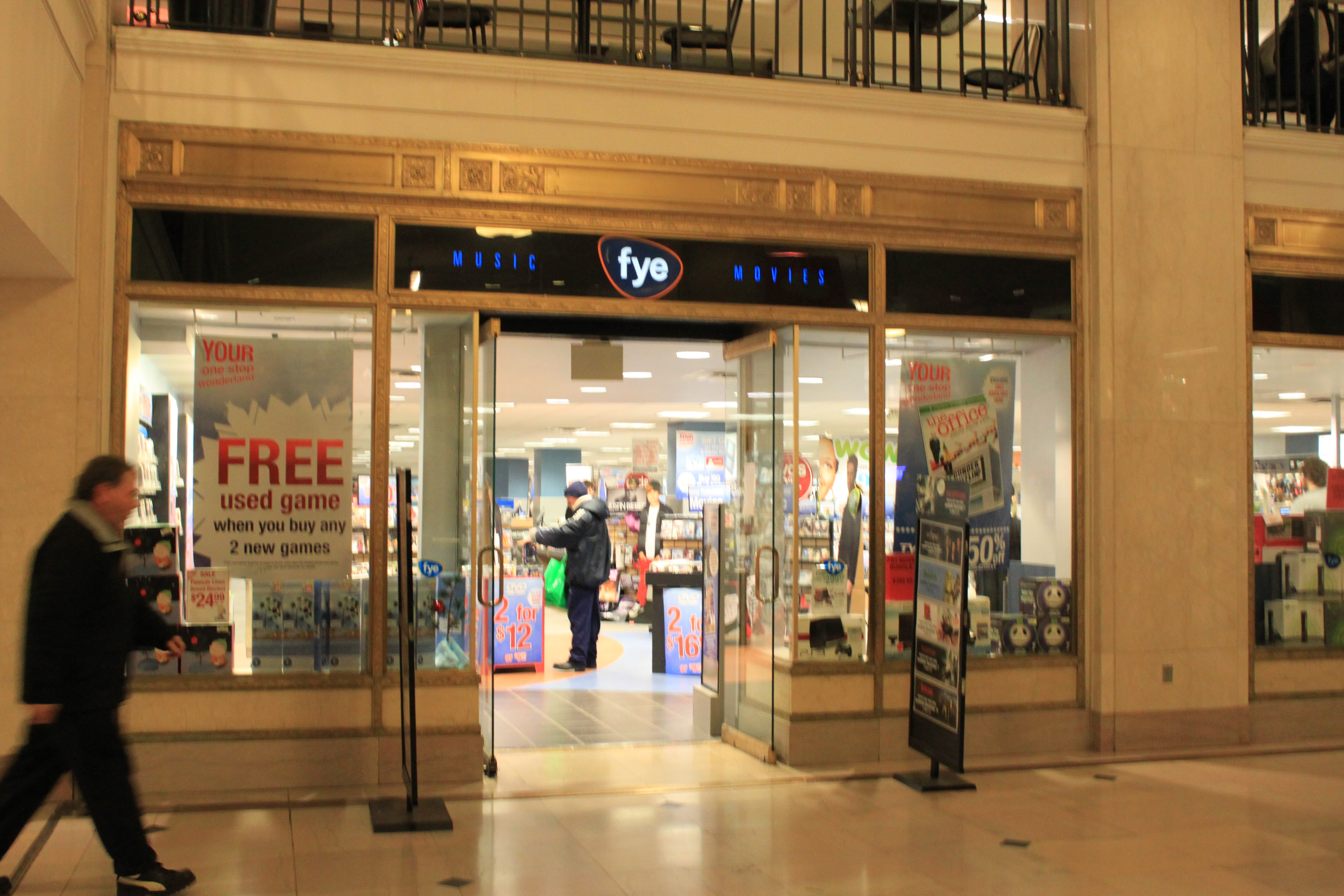
FYE store, Tower City Center, Cleveland, Ohio

The first FYE store opened in 1993 at the Trumbull Mall in Trumbull, Connecticut. A second opened in 1995 at Eastview Mall in Victor, New York, and a third at Colonie Center in Colonie, New York in 1997.

In 2001, Trans World unified its other mall-based stores under the "f.y.e." name after buying out Camelot Music. During that year, a major re-branding campaign made f.y.e. the brand name for all of Trans World Entertainment's mall-based retail stores as well as many freestanding locations, though some freestanding or strip mall stores continued to operate under regional brands like Planet Music. In 2016 the company changed the store and website branding to "FYE".

In 2006, Trans World began remodeling buildings that were former Coconut stores and Media Play outlets near Salt Lake City, Utah and Buffalo, New York into FYE superstores. In 2009 FYE closed over 100 locations and 52 more in 2012.

Trans World opened new FYE concept stores in multiple locations (such as the Rockaway Townsquare in Rockaway, New Jersey) in 2016. The new FYE featured a new logo and look, a larger focus on pop-culture related items, an expanded selection of vinyl records and modern turntables, while the selection of Blu-rays, DVDs and CDs has been reduced.

In March 2017, FYE founder and CEO Bob Higgins died. Higgins was responsible for the creating the FYE brand as well as maintaining its profitability and therefore its status as the last remaining music chain store.

In November 2018, FYE's parent company was accused in federal court of deceiving customers by asking them to sign up for "free" and/or "loyalty" membership programs and magazine subscriptions while charging their credit and debit cards $11.99 per month until customers canceled the services. Another allegation was that customer information was shared with marketing company Synapse without customer consent.

In 2018, 33 FYE stores were closed, and 35 more were scheduled to be closed before the end of Trans World's fiscal year on February 2, 2019.

In the fiscal year ended February 1, 2020, FYE posted a loss of $50.7 million for the retail chain, more than double of the previous year. Later that same year, Sunrise Records announced and subsequently finalized their purchase of FYE from TWEC.

In 2021, Spec's Music in Puerto Rico that was operated by FYE closed down.

In September 2024, Alex Baby & Toy, an FYE concept that opened in April 2022, closed down.

In November 2024, it was announced that Coconuts Music & Movies in Evansville, Indiana, operated by FYE, would be closed, with closure occurring in January 2025.

== Nameplates ==
Though the majority of chains acquired by parent company Trans World Entertainment were completely converted into FYE stores (many of which have since closed), a few chains have had a handful of stores kept open, though otherwise being stocked and operated the same as a traditional FYE except for the nameplate. These are:

- Sam Goody: Medford, Oregon
- Suncoast Motion Picture Company: Jacksonville, North Carolina.
- A FYE and Suncoast combo store remains in Beavercreek, Ohio in The Mall at Fairfield Commons.

== See also ==
- Suncoast Motion Picture Company
- Sam Goody
